= United States national wushu team =

Wushu team

USA Wushu Team
- Founded: 1981
- Continental union: PAWF
- National federation: USAWKF

World Championships
- Appearances: 16
- Medals: x 2 x 16 x 31

World Cup
- Appearances: 3
- Medals: x 0 x 0 x 4

World Games
- Appearances: 3
- Medals: x 3 x 0 x 1

The United States national wushu team (also known as the US Wushu Team) represents the United States in IWUF international competitions. It has been organized by the United States of America Wushu Kungfu Federation (USAWKF) since 1993. The US Wushu Team organizes a taolu (forms) team and sanda (sparring) team for competitive contemporary wushu. The A teams of both disciplines attend the World Wushu Championships and other top international events, and he B and C teams typically attend the Pan American Wushu Championships and other events. The USAWKF also organizes a traditional wushu (kung fu) team, as well as taijiquan teams for the World Kungfu Championships and the World Taijiquan Championships respectively.

== History ==
=== Early teams: 1981-1993 ===
The 1974 China national wushu team tour marked the first time modern wushu was performed in the United States. Starting in the late 1970s, modern wushu coaches from China began to immigrate to the United States, most notably including Bow-sim Mark, Anthony Chan, and Roger Tung. In 1981, they organized the first US Wushu Team with the purpose to train with the Jiangsu Wushu Team. Donnie Yen and Kenny Perez were invited to train additionally with the Beijing Wushu Team under Wu Bin and Jet Li. In 1982, a team was organized to attend the 1st International Friendship Exchange in Nanjing, China.

In 1985, the 1st International Invitational Wushu Championships were organized by the Chinese Wushu Association. The United States finished fourth with Richard Vecchiolla placing third in men's all-around. In addition, Chris Yen notably won a bronze medal in changquan, becoming the youngest medal winner at the competition. At the 2nd championships in 1986, Philip Wong and Nick Gracenin finished second and third respectively in men's all-around. The US also participated in the 3rd championships in 1988. With the founding of the International Wushu Federation in 1990, the 1991 World Wushu Championships was quickly organized, with Andrew Hartono (jianshu), David Ross (taijiquan), and Jason Yee (sanda) being the first medalists from the United States at the competition.

From the mid-1980s until the early 1990s, wushu in the United States was largely promoted by the North American Chinese Martial Arts Federation (NACMAF) and the United States Chinese Martial Arts Council (USCMAC), but neither organization was principally involved in sending athletes to the international championships, it was only done through a process of appointment by coaches.

=== Modern teams: 1993-today ===
==== Taolu ====
In 1993, the United States of America Wushu Kungfu Federation was founded under Anthony Goh and began implementing a formal team trials competition process every two years select the members of the US Wushu team. The first team trials was organized ahead of the 1993 World Wushu Championships. Athletes were ranked based on their combined score of an open-hand and weapon event. From 1993-1995, the US Wushu Team roster consisted of eight individuals not equally split between genders, and with a system of primary and reserve members. In 1997, the team became evenly split with four male and female athletes. In 1999, the system of A and B teams were created. Between 1999 and 2001, the USAWKF underwent a political schism. The team managed by Anthony Goh was ruled by the IWUF to be the legitimate US Wushu Team, and so that delegation represented the United States at the 2001 World Wushu Championships. In 2003, the multi-team system was expanded to include a C team. With the 2004 Pan American Wushu Championships, the USAWKF began to only send members of the B and C teams to the championships.

In 2005 due to a change in IWUF regulations, the capacities of individual teams were expanded eight to ten members (5 male and female). In addition, the IWUF 2005 taolu rules were used, but only group A or B difficulty techniques were scored (C or D group difficulty techniques or connections were scored the same as B group). Starting with the 2008 Beijing Wushu Tournament, members of the US Wushu Team would begin competing in major international multi-sport competitions. In 2009, the US Wushu Team selection criteria was changed so that athletes must place in the top-three of one of the five categories: changquan, daoshu+gunshu, jianshu+qiangshu, nanquan (+nangun for male, +nandao for female), and taijiquan+taijijian. At the 2009 World Wushu Championships, Alfred Hsing won the United States' first gold medal in taolu. Then at the 2013 World Games, Colvin Wang won the gold medal in men's changquan. In 2015, IWUF regulations changed again and the A team was reduced from ten to eight members, thus the B and C teams were expanded from ten to twelve members each. In addition, athletes were no longer ranked by their respective events, but by combined score of one open-hand and one weapon event.

Due to the COVID-19 pandemic, several international wushu competitions were cancelled or postponed. Ahead of the 2022 Pan American Wushu Championships, a supplemental team trials was held to select a team of fourteen individuals to compete at the championships. The same year, the United States hosted the 2022 World Games where Brian Wang and Mia Tian won gold medals in men's jianshu/qiangshu and women's daoshu/gunshu respectively. In 2023, the first regular team trials in four years was organized. In 2025, the selection criteria was changed once again to ranking based on the five categories similar to 2009.

==== Sanda ====
By the early 1990s, sanda was sparsely promoted in the United States as opposed to taolu. Two figures who would eventually popularize the sport more were David Ross, an organizer of tournaments in the East Coast, and Shi Deru (Shawn Liu) who was appointed coach of the US Sanda Team ahead of the 1995 World Wushu Championships. Starting during the 1995 edition and the following two World Wushu Championships, Cung Le would become a triple bronze medalist. Liu would also coach Pat Barry around this time who would win a silver medal in the 2003 World Wushu Championships. The same year, Elaina Maxwell won the United States' first gold medal in sanda, and would also be a silver medalist at the 2005 World Wushu Championships while being coached by Cung Le. Since the 2007 World Wushu Championships, Yi-Yuan (Ian) Lee has been the coach of the US Sanda Team and organizer of the US Sanda Team Trials.

=== Taolu Team Trials ===
Year	Location	Dates	Men's champion	Women's champion	Ref
1991	Dallas, Texas; San Francisco, California		N/A	N/A	
1993	Baltimore, Maryland		Woody Wong	Amy Chow	
1995	Baltimore, Maryland		Woody Wong	Amy Chow	
1997	Atlanta, Georgia	July 13-14	Nathan Tong	Mae Hsu	
1999	Houston Texas	May 1-2	Nathan Tong	Mae Hsu	
2001	~~Berkeley, California~~; Baltimore, Maryland	~~April 21-22~~; April 28-29	~~Nathan Tong~~; Justin Ma	~~Felicia Sze~~; Anita Lopez	
2003	Annandale, Virginia	July 26-27	Jason Lui	Cheri Haight	
2005	South Windsor, Connecticut	August 6-7	Christopher Sexton	Jessica Zhang	
2007	College Park, Maryland	July 14-15	Colvin Wang	Sarah Chang	
2009	Cupertino, California	July 20-21	Alfred Hsing	Sarah Chang	
2011	San Jose, California	June 25-26	Colvin Wang	Brenda Hatley	
2013	Sterling, Virginia	July 6-7	Colvin Wang	Brenda Hatley	
2015	San Jose, California	July 18-19	Justin Benedik	Emily Fan	
2017	Lubbock, Texas	July 21-23	Dominic Chow	Lucy Lee	
2019	San Jose, California	July 9-10	Andrew Xi	Mia Tian	
2022	Lubbock, Texas	May 27-28	Sen Gao	Jean Hoang	
2023	Lubbock, Texas	May 26-28	Tristan Kooc	Mia Tian	
2025	Lubbock, Texas	June 28-29	Shaun Zhang	Lucy Lee	

=== Sanda Team Trials ===
Year	Location	Dates	Ref
1999	Houston Texas	May 1-2	
2003	Atlanta, Georgia	June 27-28	
2005	San Jose, California	July 23	
2007	Lubbock, Texas	September 7-8	
2009	Lubbock, Texas	June 25	
2011			
2013			
2015	Lubbock, Texas	August 1-2	
2017	Lubbock, Texas	July 21-23	
2019	Chandler, Arizona	June 7-9	
2022	Lubbock, Texas	May 27-28	
2023	Lubbock, Texas	May 26-28	
2025	Lubbock, Texas	June 28-29	

== Competition results ==
=== World Wushu Championships ===
The International Wushu Federation does not publish all-time medal tables or medal statistics per each national federation. The IWUF only publishes individual championships results and thus the tables below are compilations of those results.

Red border color indicates host nation status.

Edition	Gold	Silver	Bronze	Total	Gold medals	Total Medals	References
(China) 1991 Beijing	0	1	2	3	11	7	
(Malaysia) 1993 Kuala Lumpur	0	0	0	0	-	-	
(United States) 1995 Baltimore	0	2	4	6	13	6	
(Italy) 1997 Rome	0	0	1	1	20	17	
1999 Hong Kong	0	1	2	3	14	9	
(Armenia) 2001 Yerevan	0	2	1	3	14	14	
2003 Macau	1	1	1	3	11	14	
(Vietnam) 2005 Hanoi	0	2	4	6	13	8	
(China) 2007 Beijing	0	0	0	0	-	-	
(Canada) 2009 Toronto	1	1	0	2	13	16	
(Turkey) 2011 Ankara	0	2	2	4	13	12	
(Malaysia) 2013 Kuala Lumpur	0	1	2	3	19	17	
(Indonesia) 2015 Jakarta	0	2	5	7	17	9	
(Russia) 2017 Kazan	0	1	1	2	18	18	
(China) 2019 Shanghai	0	0	3	3	23	16	
(United States) 2023 Dallas	0	1	3	4	16	9	
(Brazil) 2025 Brasilia	0	0	3	3	22	18	
(Philippines) 2027 Manila							
Total	2	16	34	53			

=== World Games ===
Games	Gold	Silver	Bronze	Total	Gold medals	Total Medals	References
(Chinese Taipei) 2009 Kaohsiung	-	-	-	-	-	-	
(Colombia) 2013 Cali	1	0	1	2	5	6	
(United States) 2022 Birmingham	2	0	0	2	2	5	
(China) 2025 Chengdu	0	0	0	0	-	-	
Total	3	0	1	4			

=== Taolu World Cup ===
Edition	Gold	Silver	Bronze	Total	Gold medals	Total Medals	References
(China) 2016 Fuzhou	0	0	0	0	-	-	
(Myanmar) 2018 Yangon	0	0	3	3	14	10	
(Japan) 2024 Yokohama	0	0	1	1	13	13	
(China) 2026 Hainan	0	0	0	0	-	-	
Total	0	0	4	4			

=== Pan American Wushu Championships ===
Edition	Gold	Silver	Bronze	Total	Gold medals	Total Medals
(Argentina) 1996 Buenos Aires	?	?	?	?		
(Canada) 1998 Toronto	?	?	?	?		
(Brazil) 2000 Manaus	?	?	?	?		
(Venezuela) 2002 Merida	19	8	3	30	1	1
(United States) 2004 Annandale	14	10	8	32	1	1
(Canada) 2006 Toronto	7	5	7	19	3	2
(Brazil) 2008 São Paulo	0	6	3	9	5	5
(Argentina) 2010 Buenos Aires	12	3	5	20	2	2
(Mexico) 2012 Monterrey	?	?	?	?		
(Costa Rica) 2014 San José	11	5	3	19	2	2
(United States) 2016 Lubbock	13	13	5	31	2	1
(Argentina) 2018 Buenos Aires	11	9	3	23	1	1
(Brazil) 2022 Brasilia	10	10	6	26	2	2
(United States) 2024 Santa Clara	18	14	5	37	1	1
(Argentina) 2026 Buenos Aires	15	14	11	40	1	1
Total	130	97	59	286		

== Most decorated athletes ==
Minus results from the 1996 and 1998 Pan American Championships.

Rank	Athlete	Discipline	Years	Other muti-sport	World Games	World Championships	World Cup	Pan American Championships	Total
1	Stephanie Lim	Changquan (JS, GS, QS)	2008-2022					x 6 x 3 x 2	11
2	Lucy Lee	Nanquan	2013-2025	x 2		x 2 x 3	x 3		10
3	William Vo	Changquan (JS, GS, QS)	2022-2024					x 4 x 3 x 2	9
4	Anita Lopez	Changquan (JS+QS)	1997-2002			x 1		x 6	7
4	Leianna Yuen	Nanquan	2024-			x 1		x 5 x 1	7
4	Sen Gao	Changquan (DS+GS)	2022-2024					x 7	7
4	Deborah Yang	Taijiquan	1999-2004					x 7	7
8	Tiffany Reyes	Changquan (JS+QS)	2006-2010	x 1				x 4 x 1	6
8	Mia Tian	Changquan (DS+GS)	2017-2023	x 1	x 1	x 1 x 1	x 2		6

=== Notable athletes ===
==== Taolu ====
- Sarah Chang
- Phillip Chen
- Jeffrey Falcon
- Alfred Hsing
- Alex Huynh
- Cynthia Rothrock
- Philip Sahagun
- D.Y. Sao
- Robin Shou
- Brian Wang
- Colvin Wang
- Donnie Yen
- Chris Yen

==== Sanda ====
- Cung Le
- Elaina Maxwell
- Pat Barry

== See also ==
- United States of America Wushu Kungfu Federation
- China national wushu team

== Current roster ==
As of June 29, 2025.

=== Men's Taolu Team ===
Name	Team
Luke Tian	A
Nathan Ly	A
Shaun Zhang	A
Ashton Yim	A
Seth Burns	B
Zheng Zhou	B
Nicholas Sun	B
Ashton Wu	B
Stanley Meng	B
Justin Shen	B
Jonathan Payumo	C
Sen Gao	C
Preston Land	C
Nathan Chao	C
Jacopo Signore	C
Lyubomir Tzankov	C

=== Women's Taolu Team ===
Name	Team
Lucy Lee	A
Elena Chow	A
Leianna Yuen	A
Ashley Oshiba	A
Riyana Thenuwara	B
Charisse Hung	B
Michiko Wu-Inouye	B
Emily Jian	B
Lanhong Huang	B
Priscilla Zou	B
Kolette Kooc	C
Rylee Kate Fung	C
Amy Wong	C
Maggie Cheng	C
Victoria Ding	C
Chole Zhao	C

=== Men's Sanda Team ===
Name	Class
Jayden Saucedo	60kg
Spencer Meng	65kg
Andrew Tate	70kg
Jared Whittler	75kg

=== Women's Sanda Team ===
Name	Class
Shea Scarborough	52kg
Sydney Carr	75kg
