= Leianna Yuen =

American wushu practitioner

Personal information
- Born: 2002 (age 23–24) United States

Sport
- Sport: Wushu
- Events: Nanquan, Nandao, Nangun
- University team: UCSD Wushu
- Team: US Wushu Team
- Coached by: Alex Tran, Xiaotang Liu
Medal record
Women's Wushu Taolu
Representing United States
World Championships
Bronze medal – third place	2025 Brasília	Nanquan
Pan American Championships
Gold medal – first place	2024 Santa Clara	Nanquan
Gold medal – first place	2024 Santa Clara	Nangun
Gold medal – first place	2026 Buenos Aires	Nanquan
Gold medal – first place	2026 Buenos Aires	Nandao
Gold medal – first place	2026 Buenos Aires	Jiti
Bronze medal – third place	2026 Buenos Aires	Nangun
World Kungfu Championships
Gold medal – first place	2019 Emeishan	Nanquan C
Gold medal – first place	2019 Emeishan	Guandao C
Silver medal – second place	2017 Emeishan	Nanquan B
Bronze medal – third place	2017 Emeishan	Jianshu B
Pan American Kungfu Championships
Gold medal – first place	2023 Markham	Nanquan E
Gold medal – first place	2023 Markham	Nandao E
Gold medal – first place	2023 Markham	Guandao E

Leianna Yuen (born 2002) is a wushu practitioner from the United States.

== Career ==
Yuen started wushu at the age of 12. She made her traditional international debut at the 2017 World Kungfu Championships and won a silver medal in nanquan and a bronze medal in jianshu. At the 2019 championships, she won gold medals in nanquan and guandao. The same year, she joined he US Wushu Team. After the COVID-19 pandemic, Yuen made her traditional continental debut at the 2023 Pan American Kungfu Championships and won gold medals in nanquan, nandao, and guandao. The following year, she made her contemporary debut at the 2024 Pan American Wushu Championships where she became the Pan American champion in nanquan and nandao. She also was a triple gold medalist at the 2024 Collegiate Wushu Tournament at UCLA.

Yuen made her contemporary international debut at the 2025 World Wushu Championships and won the bronze medal in nanquan. Her high placements qualified her for the 2026 Taolu World Cup where she placed fourth in nanquan and nangun.
