= Collegiate Wushu Tournament =

Recurring wushu competition

- Genre: National collegiate event
- Frequency: Annually
- Country: United States
- Inaugurated: 1997
- Founders: Brandon Sugiyama (Oregon); Raffi Kalamian (UC Berkeley); Mae Hsu (UC Berkeley); Felicia Sze (UCLA)
- Most recent: 2025
- Organiser: Collegiate Wushu Committee
- Website: Official Website

The Collegiate Wushu Tournament, previously known as the Intercollegiate Wushu Championships, is a collegiate wushu taolu competition. The tournament was founded in 1997 and is the highest level at which wushu taolu takes place at the post-secondary level in the United States. The Collegiate Wushu Tournament is also the first wushu competition in the United States to include groupset and team all-around championships modeled after competitions in China including the national games.

Eligible competitors must either be enrolled (either full or part-time), on a brief leave of absence, or have recently graduated from an institution based in North America. Medalists of the Collegiate Wushu Tournament have included US Wushu Team members Alfred Hsing, Colvin Wang, Brian Wang, Phillip Chen, and others. Phillip Dang and Stephanie Lim hold the most individual all-around titles in men's and women's events respectively, while UC Berkeley (Cal Wushu) holds the most team titles.

Results of this competition are not affiliated with the selection process for wushu at the Summer Universiade.

== Editions ==
| Edition | Year | Host | Venue | Ref |
|---|---|---|---|---|
| 1 | 1997 | University of Oregon | Woodruff Gym | |
| 2 | 1998 | UC Berkeley (Note: The 1998 Collegiates was originally organized to be hosted by UCLA, but the team backed out on short notice.) | Recreational Sports Facility | |
| 3 | 1999 | UC Irvine | Anteater Recreation Center | |
| 4 | 2000 | Stanford University | Burnham Pavilion | |
| 5 | 2001 | CSU-Fullerton | Titan Student Union | |
| 6 | 2002 | University of Oregon | Woodruff Gym | |
| 7 | 2003 (Note: The "2003 Collegiates" (as it is known) was actually hosted during November 2002.) | UC Berkeley | Recreational Sports Facility | |
| 8 | 2004 | Stanford University | Burnham Pavilion | |
| 9 | 2005 | UC Davis | Hickey Gymnasium | |
| 10 | 2006 | University of Oregon | Woodruff Gym | |
| 11 | 2007 | UMD, College Park | Xfinity Center | |
| 12 | 2008 | Stanford University | Burnham Pavilion | |
| 13 | 2009 | Georgia Tech | Campus Recreation Center | |
| 14 | 2010 | University of Oregon | Woodruff Gym | |
| 15 | 2011 | UCLA | Student Activities Center | |
| 16 | 2012 | University of Virginia | Memorial Gymnasium | |
| 17 | 2013 | UC San Diego | Main Gym | |
| 18 | 2014 | UMD, College Park | Xfinity Center | |
| 19 | 2015 | UC Irvine | Anteater Recreation Center | |
| 20 | 2016 | Columbia University | Alfred Lerner Hall | |
| 21 | 2017 | University of Washington | Activities and Recreation Center | |
| 22 | 2018 | University of Pittsburgh | Fitzgerald Field House | |
| 23 | 2019 | UC Irvine | Anteater Recreation Center | |
| 24 | 2023 | UC Berkeley (Note: The 2023 Collegiates was originally organized to be hosted by Spartan Wushu (SJSU), but fell apart due to organizational difficulties. Cal Wushu (UC Berkeley) volunteered to host the competition on very short notice.) | Yerba Buena High School | |
| 25 | 2024 | UCLA | John Wooden Center | |
| 26 | 2025 | UMD, College Park | Ritchie Coliseum | |
| 27 | 2026 | UC Davis | University Credit Union Center | |

== History ==
=== Origins ===
In the 1970s, modern wushu practitioners began to emigrate from China into the United States and began opening teaching studios. One such person was Anthony Chan who curated wushu in the San Francisco Bay Area. In 1981, Chan founded Cal Wushu as the wushu team of UC Berkeley, but the team dissolved around 1983 when he moved to Los Angeles. Another individual of this first wave of modern wushu emigrants was Roger Tung who was pivotal in developing wushu in Seattle then in Los Angeles. In 1986, he co-founded the UCLA Wushu Team with student Tom Hagan. A year later, Cal Wushu was reestablished by Bryant Fong. In 1992, the team began hosting the Chinese Martial Arts Tournament (CMAT) which became the first martial arts competition in the United States exclusively for Chinese martial arts. The third collegiate wushu team to be created was the University of Oregon Wushu Team by future movie star Daniel Wu in 1994.

In 1996, members of Cal Wushu, UCLA Wushu, and UO Wushu met at CMAT. Despite the growing competition circuit being established by the United States of America Wushu Kungfu Federation, the collegiate students wanted to create a competition exclusively for college wushu teams. On February 9, 1997, the Oregon All-Collegiate Wushu Invitational was held at the University of Oregon as the first "wushu collegiates." The competition was organized by future US Wushu Team member Brandon Sugiyama who became known as the "father of collegiates."

=== Competition history ===
==== Early period: 1997-2003 ====
After the 1997 collegiates, other teams at schools such as Stanford, UC Irvine, and CSU Fullerton were quickly established. The collegiate wushu community also developed a close association with the Beijing Wushu Team and Wu Bin in the late 1990s since Cal Wushu and UCLA Wushu hosted the team during their US tours. Some members, including Liu Qinghua, Jian Zengjiao, He Jingde, Li Jing, and Jiang Bangjun, would judge the 1999 collegiates in UC Irvine. After a number of incidents relating to competitor eligibility in that competition, the rules were revised heavily ahead of the 2000 collegiates. As a result, only UC Berkeley and Stanford were eligible to field teams to that competition. This collegiates also marked the first time a non-West Coast team attended the competition which was the University of Wisconsin–Madison Wushu Team. Other teams that were formed after the turn of the century were based at schools including the University of Maryland - College Park (Terp Wushu), University of Texas at Austin, Ohio State University (Dragon Phoenix Wushu Team), and UCSD.

==== Modernization: 2004-2019 ====
In late 2003, the IWUF published the first draft of the major "Rules for International Taolu Competition" revision. As a result, the rules were revised ahead of the 2004 Collegiates which added a score component of 0.6 points to advanced changquan and nanquan that can consist of degree of difficulty (nandu) movements. All other events continued to be judged by IWUF 1998 Rules. In 2006, the US Wushu Union (not to be confused with the USAWKF) published a rules revision which was then adopted by the Collegiate Wushu Tournament in 2008.

In 2007, Terp Wushu hosted the first Collegiate Wushu Tournament on the East Coast, which began the trend of the tournament alternating between the west and east coasts every two years. This development along with Terp Wushu's University Wushu Games (UWG) promoted collegiate wushu on the East Coast, and thus teams at places such as Columbia University, Harvard, Cornell, Yale, and the University of Pittsburgh began to form.

Starting with the 2009 collegiates at Georgia Tech, Cal Wushu would begin a winning streak in the groupset and team all-around championships for a decade. One of the most famous incidents during this time period was during the 2011 collegiates at UCLA, where Keenan Stone of the University of Virginia lost his pants during his compulsory changquan routine. At the 2019 collegiates at UC Irvine, UCLA ended Cal Wushu's championship title streak in the groupset event.

==== Post-pandemic era: 2020-present ====
The quick onset of the COVID-19 pandemic cancelled the 2020 Collegiate Wushu Tournament at Columbia University on very short notice. In 2022 amidst uncertainties over reopening, Terp Wushu volunteered to host the 1st Intercollegiate Wushu Games in May as a substitute for an official collegiates. A few months later, San Jose State University's Spartan Wushu won the bid to host the 2023 collegiates but faced several administrative issues. Cal Wushu eventually offered to host the 2023 collegiates. At the competition, UCLA Wushu became the first team to achieve a podium sweep for the team all-around championship. Terp Wushu also hosted the 2nd Intercollegiate Wushu Games the same day as the Collegiate Wushu Tournament to cater to East Coast schools. The following year in 2024, the first full collegiates in five years was finally held at UCLA.

== Competition ==
Unlike most national or international wushu competitions (with the exception of the Taolu World Cup), the Collegiate Wushu Tournament only runs taolu events and no sanda events. The competition runs both modern and traditional wushu events across advanced, intermediate, and beginner categories for each gender. All-around titles and degree of difficulty events are restricted only to advanced athletes.

As of 2024, almost all events are judged according to the 2002/2006 US Wushu Union Rules which are modeled after the IWUF 1998 rules. The 10.0 score is broken into three components: 6.0 points for "technical specifications of performance," 2.0 points for "demonstration of power and coordination of rhythm," and 2.0 points for "elements of spirit, rhythm, content, structure and choreography."

== Champions ==
=== Groupset national champions ===
| Year | Gold | Silver | Bronze |
|---|---|---|---|
| 1997 | UCLA | UC Berkeley | Oregon |
| 1998 | UC Berkeley | UCLA | Oregon |
| 1999 | UC Berkeley | UCLA | UC Irvine |
| 2000 | Stanford | UC Berkeley | UC Berkeley |
| 2001 | UC Berkeley | unknown | unknown |
| 2002 | UC Berkeley | Stanford | UCLA |
| 2002 | UC Berkeley | UCLA | Arizona |
| 2004 | UC Irvine | UC Berkeley | UC Berkeley |
| 2005 | UC Berkeley | unknown | unknown |
| 2006 | UC Berkeley | unknown | unknown |
| 2007 | UC Berkeley | UC Berkeley | UC Davis |
| 2008 | UCLA | Stanford | UC Berkeley |
| 2009 | UC Berkeley | UCLA | unknown |
| 2010 | UC Berkeley | UCLA | UC Berkeley |
| 2011 | UC Berkeley | UCLA | UCSD |
| 2012 | UC Berkeley | UCSD | UC Berkeley |
| 2013 | UC Berkeley | unknown | unknown |
| 2014 | UC Berkeley | Maryland | UCLA |
| 2015 | UC Berkeley | unknown | UCLA |
| 2016 | UC Berkeley | Stanford | UCSD |
| 2017 | UC Berkeley | Maryland | Stanford |
| 2018 | UC Berkeley | Stanford | Maryland |
| 2019 | UCLA | Stanford | Maryland |
| 2023 | UCLA | UCLA | Washington |
| 2024 | UC Berkeley | UCLA | Maryland |
| 2025 | UC Berkeley | UCLA | Maryland |
| 2026 | UC Berkeley | UCLA | Columbia |

=== Groupset titles ===
| School | # | Years won |
|---|---|---|
| California | 21 | 1998, 1999, 2001, 2002, 2003, 2005, 2006, 2007, 2009, 2010, 2011, 2012, 2013, 2014, 2015, 2016, 2017, 2018, 2024, 2025, 2026 |
| UCLA | 4 | 1997, 2008, 2019, 2023 |
| UC Irvine | 1 | 2004 |
| Stanford | 1 | 2000 |

=== Team all-around national champions ===
| Year | Gold | Silver | Bronze |
|---|---|---|---|
| 1997 | UCLA | UC Berkeley | Oregon |
| 1998 | UC Berkeley | Oregon | UCLA |
| 1999 | UC Berkeley | UCLA | UC Irvine |
| 2000 | UC Berkeley | Stanford | UC Berkeley |
| 2001 | Stanford | unknown | unknown |
| 2002 | UC Berkeley | UCLA | Stanford |
| 2002 | UC Berkeley | UCLA | Stanford |
| 2004 | UC Berkeley | Stanford | Stanford |
| 2005 | UC Berkeley | unknown | unknown |
| 2006 | Stanford | unknown | unknown |
| 2007 | UC Berkeley | UC Berkeley | UC Davis |
| 2008 | Stanford | UC Berkeley | Maryland |
| 2009 | UC Berkeley | unknown | unknown |
| 2010 | UC Berkeley | UCLA | UC Berkeley |
| 2011 | UC Berkeley | UCLA | UC Berkeley |
| 2012 | UC Berkeley | UCSD | UC Berkeley |
| 2013 | UC Berkeley | unknown | UCLA |
| 2014 | UC Berkeley | Virginia | Maryland |
| 2015 | UC Berkeley | UCLA | unknown |
| 2016 | UC Berkeley | Stanford | UCSD |
| 2017 | UC Berkeley | UC Irvine | UC Irvine |
| 2018 | UC Berkeley | unknown | unknown |
| 2019 | UC Berkeley | unknown | Maryland |
| 2023 | UCLA | UCLA | UCLA |
| 2024 | UC Berkeley | UCLA | UCLA |
| 2025 | Virginia | Maryland | Illinois |
| 2026 | | | |

=== Team all-around titles ===
| School | # | Years won |
|---|---|---|
| California | 20 | 1998, 1999, 2000, 2002, 2003, 2004, 2005, 2007, 2009, 2010, 2011, 2012, 2013, 2014, 2015, 2016, 2017, 2018, 2019, 2024 |
| Stanford | 3 | 2001, 2006, 2008 |
| UCLA | 2 | 1997, 2023 |
| Virginia | 1 | 2025 |

=== Individual all-around national champions ===
| Year | Male | Female |
|---|---|---|
| 1997 | Eric Yeh (UC Berkeley) | Felicia Sze (UCLA) |
| 1998 | Luke Harrington (Oregon) | Mae Hsu (UC Berkeley) |
| 1999 | Nathan Tong (UC Berkeley) | Mae Hsu (UC Berkeley) |
| 2000 | Justin Ho (CalTech) | Janet Hsu (Stanford) |
| 2001 | Phillip Chen (Fullerton) | unknown |
| 2002 | Phillip Dang (Oregon) | Ava Choy (Simon Fraser) |
| 2002 | Phillip Dang (Oregon) | Tiffany Reyes (UCLA) |
| 2004 | Phillip Dang (Oregon) | Paula Amidani (UPIS) |
| 2005 | Charles Hwong (UC Berkeley) | unknown |
| 2006 | Phillip Dang (Oregon) | Kunyu Ching (Stanford) |
| 2007 | unknown | unknown |
| 2008 | Dennis Ta (Fullerton) | Stephanie Lim (Alameda) |
| 2009 | unknown | unknown |
| 2010 | Jarrad Lee (UCLA) | Stephanie Lim (Alameda); Elaine Ho (UCLA) |
| 2011 | Matthew Tay (UCSD) | Stephanie Lim (Alameda) |
| 2012 | Colvin Wang (UVA) | Annie Ma (UCLA) |
| 2013 | unknown | unknown |
| 2014 | Jesse Lou (CSU SLO) | Chrystina Yu (UC Berkeley) |
| 2015 | unknown | Chrystina Yu (UC Berkeley) |
| 2016 | unknown | unknown |
| 2017 | unknown | unknown |
| 2018 | unknown | unknown |
| 2019 | unknown | unknown |
| 2023 | David Cao (UCSD) | Tara Chand (UCSD) |
| 2024 | William Vo (UCLA) | Rainbow Huang (Northeastern) |
| 2025 | Bryan Gao (UMD) | Christina Ou (Fordham) |
| 2026 | | |

== See also ==
- Wushu at the Summer World University Games
- United States of America Wushu Kungfu Federation
