= 2004 Pan American Wushu Championships =

5th edition of the Pan American Wushu Championships

- Venue: Northern Virginia Community College, Annandale
- Location: Annandale, Virginia, United States
- Start date: July 10, 2004
- End date: July 11, 2004

The 2004 Pan American Wushu Championships was the 5th edition of the Pan American Wushu Championships. It was held from July 10-11, 2004 at the Northern Virginia Community College, Annandale Campus in Annandale, Virginia, United States. This was the first time the United States hosted the Pan American championships, preceding editions in 2016 and 2024.

For taolu events, only the second compulsory routines were used in competition.

== Medal table ==
* Host nation (United States)

Rank	Nation	Gold	Silver	Bronze	Total
1	United States (USA)*	14	10	8	32
2	Canada (CAN)	9	8	4	21
3	Brazil (BRA)	4	2	1	7
4	Mexico (MEX)	2	3	2	7
5	Venezuela (VEN)	1	3	1	5
6	Colombia (COL)	0	1	0	1
7	Argentina (ARG)	0	0	3	3
8	Puerto Rico (PUR)	0	0	2	2
9	Trinidad and Tobago (TTO)	0	0	1	1
Totals (9 entries)		30	27	22	79

== Medalists ==
=== Taolu ===
==== Men ====
Event	Gold	Silver	Bronze
Changquan	Merril Ong; Canada	Alex Huynh; United States	Rizqi Rachmat; United States
Daoshu	Rizqi Rachmat; United States	Mitchelle Ong; Canada	Arthur Chen; United States
Gunshu	Alex Huynh; United States	Gary Luk; Canada	none awarded
Jianshu	Stephon Morton; United States	Daniel So; Canada	Omar Vigo; Puerto Rico
Qiangshu	Merrill Ong; Canada	Jonathan Louie; Canada	Ernest Law; Canada
Nanquan	Jason Lui; United States	Nathan Lam; Canada	Ching-Yin Lee; United States
Nandao	Jason Lui; United States	Joseph Scarcella; United States	Gaston Sabaño; Argentina
Nangun	Nathan Lam; Canada	Ching-Yin Lee; United States	Gustavo Guarino; Argentina
Taijiquan	Brandon Sugiyama; United States	Gil Cesar; Venezuela	Roberto Robles; Mexico
Taijijian	Brandon Sugiyama; United States	Gil Cesar; Venezuela	Winston Ramsamoos; Trinidad and Tobago

==== Women ====
Event	Gold	Silver	Bronze
Changquan	Jessica Zhang; United States	Sarah Chang; United States	Felicia Zhang; United States
Daoshu	Candice Wong; Canada	Seline Tsang; Canada	Felicia Zhang; United States
Gunshu	Wei Jing Lee; Canada	Catherine Archer; United States	Jennifer Sun; United States
Jianshu	Jessica Zhang; United States	Margarita Cina; Canada	Haylay Ng; Canada
Qiangshu	Wei Hsin Lee; Canada	Diana Pei; United States	none awarded
Nanquan	Haylay Ng; Canada	Catherine Archer; United States	Candice Wong; Canada
Nandao	Jordana de Castro; Brazil	none awarded	none awarded
Nangun	Jodie Chiu; Canada	Renata De Faria Cordiero; Brazil	Jose Francisca; Mexico
Taijiquan	Deborah Yang; United States	Janice Yeung; United States	Tania Sakanaka; Brazil
Taijijian	Deborah Yang; United States	Tania Sakanaka; Brazil	Janice Yeung; United States

=== Sanda ===
==== Men ====
Event	Gold	Silver	Bronze
56 kg	Luis Silva Marcio; Brazil	Jose Luis Jimenez; Mexico	none awarded
60 kg	Jose Guadalupe Juarez; Mexico	Leandro Manabe; United States	none awarded
65 kg	Daniel Ramos; Mexico	Bruce Tran; Canada	Meng Wong; United States
65 kg	Daniel Ramos; Mexico	Bruce Tran; Canada	Cristian Retamar; Argentina
70 kg	Pablo Stanelli; Brazil	Agustin Juarez; Mexico	Chris Cho; Canada
70 kg	Pablo Stanelli; Brazil	Agustin Juarez; Mexico	David Mui; Venezuela
75 kg	Matt Cataleta; United States	none awarded	none awarded
80 kg	Felipe Godoy; United States	Raymond Cheung; Venezuela	none awarded
85 kg	Eduardo Fujihara; Brazil	Russ Middleton; United States	Radames Sanchez; Puerto Rico
90 kg	Brian Madigan; United States	Edwin Aguilar; Mexico	none awarded
90 kg+	Kyle Cameron; Canada	Michael Valbune; Colombia	none awarded
