= Colvin Wang =

American wushu practitioner

Personal information
- Born: August 24, 1992 (age 34)
- Years active: 1999-2013
- Height: 1.70 m (5 ft 7 in)

Sport
- Sport: Wushu
- Events: Changquan, Jianshu, Qiangshu
- University team: UVA Wushu
- Team: US Wushu Team
- Coached by: Lu Xiaolin
Medal record
Men's Wushu Taolu
Representing United States
World Games
Gold medal – first place	2013 Cali	Changquan
World Championships
Silver medal – second place	2009 Toronto	Qiangshu
Silver medal – second place	2011 Ankara	Jianshu
Silver medal – second place	2011 Ankara	Qiangshu
Bronze medal – third place	2011 Ankara	Changquan
Pan American Championships
Bronze medal – third place	2006 Toronto	Changquan
World Junior Championships
Silver medal – second place	2008 Bali	Qiangshu

Colvin Wang (born August 24, 1992) is a former wushu taolu athlete from the United States of America. He won a gold medal at the 2013 World Games.

== Career ==
Wang started practicing wushu at the age of six under Lu Xiaolin. His first major international appearance was at the 2006 Pan American Wushu Championships in Toronto, Canada, where he won bronze medals in changquan, daoshu, and gunshu. He then competed at the 2007 World Wushu Championships in Beijing, China, where he placed sixth in jianshu and fifth in qiangshu. This qualified him for the 2008 Beijing Wushu Tournament where he was the youngest athlete of the competition and placed fifth in the men's jianshu and qiangshu combined event. He then appeared at the 2008 World Junior Wushu Championships in Bali, Indonesia, and won the silver medal in group A qiangshu. A year later, Wang competed at the 2009 World Wushu Championships in Toronto, Canada, and won a silver medal in qiangshu. Two years later, he was a triple medalist at the 2011 World Wushu Championships in Ankara, Turkey. His last competition was at the 2013 World Games in Cali, Colombia, where he won the gold medal in men's changquan. Wang is the second American taolu athlete after Alfred Hsing (in 2009 World Wushu Championship) to win a gold medal at a major international competition.

== Competitive History ==
Year	Event	CQ	JS	QS	DS	AA
2006	Pan American Championships	3rd place, bronze medalist(s)	?	?		
2007	World Championships		6	5		4
2008	Beijing Wushu Tournament		5	6		5
2008	World Junior Championships	4	6	2nd place, silver medalist(s)		
2009	World Championships	31	2nd place, silver medalist(s)	8		
2011	Collegiate Tournament	1st place, gold medalist(s)	1st place, gold medalist(s)	1st place, gold medalist(s)	11	3
2011	World Championships	3rd place, bronze medalist(s)	2nd place, silver medalist(s)	2nd place, silver medalist(s)		
2013	World Games	1st place, gold medalist(s)				
2014	Collegiate Tournament	1st place, gold medalist(s)				
