= Alex Huynh =

Personal information
- Born: September 7
- Occupation(s): Martial artist, stunt man

Sport
- Sport: Wushu
- Event(s): Changquan, Daoshu, Gunshu
- Team: US Wushu Team (2003-2004)
Medal record
Representing United States
Men's Wushu Taolu
Pan American Championships
Gold medal – first place	2004 Annandale	Gunshu
Silver medal – second place	2004 Annandale	Changquan

Alex Huynh (born September 7) is a Vietnamese American martial artist and stunt man. He specializes in wushu, training at the United States Wushu Academy, and lives in Southern California, after growing up in Roanoke, Virginia and attending Northside High School. He was the Pan American champion in gunshu and the silver medalist in changquan at the 2004 Pan American Wushu Championships.

As a stunt man, he appears in the 2004 short movie The Young Master, the 2006 movie Safe, and most notably Pirates of the Caribbean. He also appears in martial demonstrations, most notably demonstrating Zui Quan in Fight Science.

In 2025, he was nominated for a Primetime Emmy Award in the category Outstanding Stunt Performance for his stunt work on the television program FBI: Most Wanted. His nomination was shared with Evelyn O. Vaccaro.
