= Phillip Chen =

American politician (born 1978)

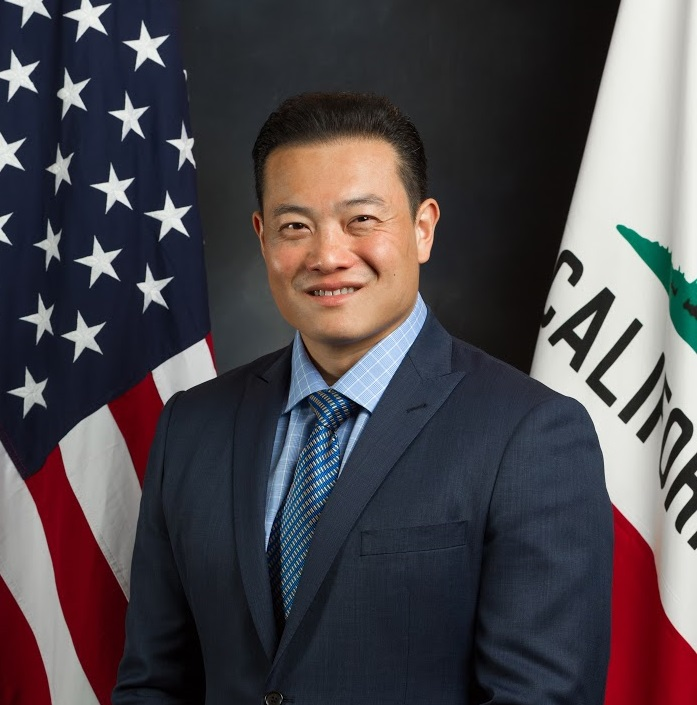

Member of the California State Assembly
- Incumbent
- Assumed office December 5, 2016
- Preceded by: Ling Ling Chang
- Constituency: 55th district (2016–2022); 59th district (2022–present)

Personal details
- Born: April 22, 1978 (age 48) El Monte, California, U.S.
- Party: Republican
- Education: California State University, Fullerton (BA); University of Southern California (MPA, PhD)
- Occupation: Politician

Chinese name
- Traditional Chinese: 陳立德
- Simplified Chinese: 陈立德
- Hanyu Pinyin: Chén Lì Dé

Phillip Chen (born April 22, 1978) is an American politician and psychologist who is a member of the California State Assembly. He is a Republican representing the 59th district, encompassing parts of North Orange County, and small parts of San Bernardino County. The district includes the cities of Brea, Yorba Linda, Placentia, Villa Park, Orange, North Tustin, Anaheim Hills, Chino, and Chino Hills. Prior to being elected to the state assembly, he was a school board trustee for the Walnut Valley Unified School District.

== Education ==
Chen graduated from Servite High School in Anaheim. In 2002, Chen earned his B.A. in Communications from California State University, Fullerton. In 2005, Chen earned a Master of Public Administration degree from the University of Southern California and, in 2014, also earned a Ph.D. in educational psychology from the university.

== Career ==
Chen is the owner of a property management company.

In 2013, Chen became an Adjunct Faculty Professor at the USC Sol Price School of Public Policy.

Chen is a former Los Angeles County Reserve Sheriff’s Deputy. Chen was appointed by former California Governor Pete Wilson to the Governor’s Office of Criminal Justice Planning, overseeing California’s juvenile justice programs. He was a member of the State Advisory Group, Juvenile Justice Legislative Committee and Juvenile Justice Native American Committee.

Chen was appointed to serve as a Board Member for the California Physical Therapy Board and worked as a health deputy to former Los Angeles County Supervisor Michael D. Antonovich.

Chen also served as adjunct faculty at California State Fullerton from 2007-2008 and at California State University, Los Angeles in 2016.

=== Political career ===
Chen was elected in November 2011 to the Walnut Valley Unified School Board and re-elected to a second term in 2015.

In 2014, Chen ran for the California State Assembly. He lost the jungle primary with a third place finish. Diamond Bar City Councilwoman Ling Ling Chang went on to easily win the general election.

Chen was elected to the California State Assembly in November 2016, when Chang left the State Assembly in an unsuccessful run for the California State Senate. He was appointed to serve in leadership as Deputy Whip to the Assembly Republican Caucus. His committee membership consists of the Banking and Finance Committee (where he serves as Vice-Chair), the Business and Professions Committee, the Insurance Committee, the Jobs, Economic Development and the Economy Committee, and the Utilities and Energy Committee.

In 2018, in the wake of California's growing mental health and homeless epidemic, Chen authored Assembly Bill 2156, to clarify and fine tune the definition of “gravely disabled”. Chen later pulled that bill from consideration by the Assembly's Health Committee. That same year, Chen also introduced AB 3005 which aimed to protect the sensitive personal information of children in foster care. Like his other bill, Chen also requested this bill to be pulled from consideration by the relevant committee.

In 2019, Chen introduced AB 517 to create a Property Crime Task Force in Orange County to prevent crimes as well as identify and arrest criminals who participate in property crimes. Chen's bill died after clearing the public safety committee.

To address the growing number of homeless encampments, Chen introduced AB 1908, the Homeless Encampment and Litter Program (HELP), putting more accountability on Caltrans in coordinating access to housing and supportive services for those who need it most. The bill died in committee with no action taken. A few days after introducing AB 1908, Chen introduced AB 2021 in an effort to preserve open space in Southern California. The bill would have required the California Department of Parks and Recreation to seek opportunities for acquiring land to expand Chino Hills State Park. The bill unanimously passed the Water, Parks and Wildlife Committee, but then died in the Appropriations Committee.

In 2021 Chen helped secure funds for the Titan Gateway Pedestrian Bridge at Cal State Fullerton. Chen, a graduate of the school, said that although the school is outside his district, many students are constituents in his district, and the bridge would be a great investment in the students.

=== Wushu career ===
Phillip Chen
Medal record

Men's wushu taolu

Representing United States

Pan American Championships
Gold medal – first place	2000 Manaus	Nandao
Silver medal – second place	2000 Manaus	Nanquan
Silver medal – second place	2000 Manaus	Nangun

Chen founded the CSUF Wushu Club in 1997 as president and coach. The team competed in the Collegiate Wushu Tournament for the first time in 1999. During this time, the club grew in its standing in the university and became a for-credit course. Chen was the tournament director of the 2001 Collegiate Wushu Tournament hosted at CSUF.

Chen was an A-team member of the 1999 US Wushu Team and competed at the 1999 World Wushu Championships in Hong Kong, where he finished seventh in nanquan and tenth in nandao. A year later at the 2000 Pan American Wushu Championships, he was the Pan American champion in nandao and additionally won silver medals in nanquan and nangun. The following year, Chen was again an A-team member of both the Berkeley and Baltimore US Wushu Teams but did not compete in the following World or Pan American championships.

== Electoral history ==
2014 California State Assembly 55th district primary election
Primary election
Party	Candidate	Votes	%
Republican	Ling Ling Chang	13,242	28.7
Democratic	Gregg D. Fritchle	12,243	26.5
Republican	Phillip Chen	10,659	23.1
Republican	Steve Tye	9,987	21.6
Total votes		46,131	100.0

2016 California State Assembly 55th district election
Primary election
Party	Candidate	Votes	%
Democratic	Gregg D. Fritchle	32,439	35.9
Republican	Phillip Chen	19,684	21.8
Republican	Mike Spence	18,737	20.7
Republican	Ray Marquez	10,881	12.0
Republican	Steven M. Tye	8,600	9.5
Total votes		90,341	100.0
General election
Republican	Phillip Chen	98,960	57.7
Democratic	Gregg D. Fritchle	72,471	42.3
Total votes		171,431	100.0
Republican hold			

2018 California State Assembly 55th district election
Primary election
Party	Candidate	Votes	%
Republican	Phillip Chen (incumbent)	42,664	47.2
Democratic	Gregg D. Fritchle	20,441	22.6
Democratic	Melissa Fazli	14,016	15.5
Republican	James G. Gerbus	9,731	10.8
Republican	Scott Lebda	3,571	3.9
Total votes		90,423	100.0
General election
Republican	Phillip Chen (incumbent)	87,928	54.9
Democratic	Gregg D. Fritchle	72,256	45.1
Total votes		160,184	100.0
Republican hold			

2020 California State Assembly 55th district election
Primary election
Party	Candidate	Votes	%
Republican	Phillip Chen (incumbent)	64,785	56.2
Democratic	Andrew E. Rodriguez	50,458	43.8
Total votes		115,243	100.0
General election
Republican	Phillip Chen (incumbent)	125,212	54.9
Democratic	Andrew E. Rodriguez	102,683	45.1
Total votes		227,895	100.0
Republican hold			

2022 California State Assembly 59th district election
Primary election
Party	Candidate	Votes	%
Republican	Phillip Chen (incumbent)	75,555	99.2
No party preference	Leon Sit (write-in)	551	0.7
Libertarian	David Naranjo (write-in)	58	0.1
Total votes		76,164	100.0
General election
Republican	Phillip Chen (incumbent)	113,363	70.0
No party preference	Leon Q. Sit	48,602	30.0
Total votes		161,965	100.0
Republican hold			

2024 California State Assembly 59th district election
Primary election
Party	Candidate	Votes	%
Republican	Phillip Chen (incumbent)	75,179	63.8
Democratic	Dave Obrand	42,719	36.2
Total votes		117,898	100.0
General election
Republican	Phillip Chen (incumbent)	139,113	60.5
Democratic	Dave Obrand	90,834	39.5
Total votes		229,947	100.0
Republican hold			

== Personal life ==
Chen and his mother are small business owners who own and operate a property management company. Chen's brother, David, is a Deputy District Attorney with the Orange County District Attorney's office.
