= Paula Amidani =

Brazilian wushu practitioner

Personal information
- Born: 1982 (age 43–44) Brasília, Brazil
- Occupation(s): Martial artist, athlete
- Height: 1.62 m (5 ft 4 in)

Sport
- Sport: Wushu
- Event(s): Changquan, Jianshu, Qiangshu
- Team: Brazil Wushu Team
Medal record
Women's Wushu Taolu
Representing Brazil
World Championships
Bronze medal – third place	2001 Yerevan	Changquan (old)
Pan American Championships
Gold medal – first place	2008 São Paulo	Duilian
Gold medal – first place	2012 Monterrey	Qiangshu
Silver medal – second place	2002 Mérida	Jianshu (new)
Silver medal – second place	2006 Toronto	Changquan
Silver medal – second place	2008 São Paulo	Jianshu
Silver medal – second place	2012 Monterrey	Jianshu
Bronze medal – third place	2002 Mérida	Changquan
Bronze medal – third place	2002 Mérida	Gunshu
Bronze medal – third place	2008 São Paulo	Qiangshu
Bronze medal – third place	2014 San José	Qiangshu

Paula Amidani (born 1982) is a Brazilian retired wushu taolu athlete. She is one of the most decorated Latin American wushu athletes of all time, having been one of the first athletes from Latin America to win a medal at the World Wushu Championships.

== Career ==
=== Competitive wushu ===
Amidani was born in 1982 in Brasília, Brazil. At the age of ten in 1992, she started practicing wushu. In 1996, she joined the inaugural Brazilian national wushu team. Her international debut was at the 2001 World Wushu Championships where she won a bronze medal in changquan. The same year, she participated in the 2001 São Paulo Carnival representing Águia de Ouro. Amidani was filmed performing a jump and herself and the sport of wushu quickly gained attention in Brazil, leading to her appearances on Hebe and Programa do Jô. A year later, Amidani won a silver medal in jianshu and bronze medals in changquan and gunshu at the 2002 Pan American Wushu Championships.

In 2004, Amidani became the female all-around champion at the Collegiate Wushu Tournament in the United States. Shortly after while training in the US for Cirque du Soleil's Kà, Amidani suffered a severe injury which worsened into a pulmonary embolism which caused cardiorespiratory arrest. She was sent to the intensive care unit and was in a coma for fifteen days. Amidani slowly recovered afterwards. Her return to international competition was at the 2006 Pan American Wushu Championships where she won a silver medal in changquan.

Amidani competed in the 2008 Pan American Wushu Championships and won a gold medal in duilian as well as silver medals in changquan and jianshu and a bronze medal in qiangshu. Shortly after, she took a break from wushu citing pregnancy and personal issues. She slowly returned to wushu training in 2010. Her last international competitive victory was at the 2014 Pan American Wushu Championships where she won a bronze medal in qiangshu. After retiring, she became a member of the International Wushu Federation athlete's committee, and was a key member in organizing for the 2025 World Wushu Championships.

=== Social work ===
Amidani is a volunteer coach of the Jovens Talentos project organized by the Ministry of Sports. She is also a CrossFit athlete, instructor, and referee.
