= Sarah Chang (actress) =

American actress and martial artist

Personal information
- Nationality: Taiwanese
- Born: March 26, 1985 (age 41) McLean, Virginia
- Occupation: actress
- Spouse: Vincent Soberano
- Website: https://www.starringsarahchang.com/

Sport
- Sport: Wushu
- Event(s): Changquan, Jianshu, Qiangshu
- Team: US Wushu Team (2001-2009)
Medal record
Representing United States
Women's Wushu Taolu
Pan American Championships
Gold medal – first place	2002 Mérida	Jianshu (new)
Gold medal – first place	2002 Mérida	Qiangshu (new)
Silver medal – second place	2004 Annandale	Changquan
Silver medal – second place	2006 Toronto	Jianshu
Silver medal – second place	2006 Toronto	Qiangshu

Sarah Chang (Chinese: 張學仁) is an American actress, producer, stunt coordinator and martial artist. Chang is best known for her work in the title role in the DJI/Wanda film, The Teacher (2018), Blood Hunters: Rise of the Hybrids (2018), Karen Wu in Circle of Bones (2019), Mei in The Trigonal: Fight for Justice (2018), and for her stunt coordination work in Gandarrapido: The Revengers Squad (2017).

== Early life ==
Chang was born in McLean, Virginia, where she spent most of her childhood. Her father was a big fan of Chinese Wu Xia movies and urged her to learn Wushu at the age of 7. Reluctantly, she joined a Wushu school in her hometown. Her first coach was Zhang Guifeng, a contemporary of Jet Li on the Beijing Wushu Team. She would eventually go on to become a US national Wushu champion, a five-time member of the US Wushu Team, and at one point, ranked #5 in the world. Wushu also became her bridge into a career in film and television.

Chang is also a direct descendant of Zhen Guo Fan.

== Career ==
=== Film and television ===
Chang's first dabble into video production was doing stunt choreography for a music video in Taiwan. Her friend, Michael Tan, who was directing this music video, needed the video talents to learn some martial arts and called in Chang to help them out. Shortly after, she joined Jimmy Hung's action team, working on popular TV series in Taiwan such as My Crossing Hero and Moon River.

Chang later moved to Beijing to study acting at Central Academy of Drama and to explore more opportunities in film and television in China. She also hosted two promotional videos for the Asia-Pacific Regional Network for Early Childhood in Beijing. This led her to direct “Sihuan Playgroup,” which won Best Overall Picture at Edutain Film Festival.

Chang landed her first feature film lead role in the multiple award-winning Blood Hunters: Rise of the Hybrids written and directed by Vincent Soberano. Shortly after, she landed her second feature film lead role in the Chinese film Excellent Doctor from Hejian (2017) with director Sun Ai Guo. She also starred in feature films such as Barbi: D' Wonder Beki (2017) and The Trigonal: Fight for Justice (2018) which premiered at the Cannes Film Market. Chang took the leading role in the psycho-horror Circle of Bones (2020).

In addition to her feature film roles, she also acted in leading roles in award-winning short films such as the big-budget Wanda Films/DJI Studios collaboration The Teacher (2018) and the novel-turned-film We Are War (2018).

After training at the Jackie Chan Stunt Team Training Center in Tianjin, China, Chang also founded a stunt wire rigging team in Manila called the SACHANG Action Design Team, providing wire rigging stunts for major blockbusters in the Philippines such as Gandarrapido: The Revengers Squad (2017), where she was also the stunt double for Pia Wurtzbach, Last Night (2017), Barbi: D' Wonder Beki (2017), A Hard Day (2018) and Sanggano, Sanggago't Sanggwapo (2018).

Wushu Championship

Chang competed for Team USA at the World Wushu Championship. Chang trained for 3 hours a day up to six times per week to prepare for the initial trials.

== Filmography ==
Film
Year	Title	Role	Notes
2017	The Teacher	The Teacher	
2017	Wolf Warrior 2	Factory owner's wife	also Celina Jade's acting/stunt double
2017	Barbi: D'Wonder Beki	Mama Mi	also rigging master
2017	Gandarrapido! The Revengers Squad	Stunt coordinator and stunt double for Pia Wurtzbach	
2017	Excellent Doctor form Hejian	Qu Ru Mei	
2017	Bleeding Steel	Stunt double	
2018	We Are War	Hummingbird	
2018	The Trigonal: Fight for Justice	Mei	
2019	Blood Hunters: Rise of the Hybrids	Gabriella	
2020	Circle of Bones	Karen Wu	
2022	Accident Man: Hitman's Holiday	Wong Siu-ling	

Television
Year	Title	Role	Notes
2014	Moon River 明若晓溪	Sanda Fighter	
2014	The Crossing Hero 超级大英雄	Nini	
2017	My Korean Jagiya	Sarah	

Theater
Year	Title	Role	Notes
2015	In the Moment 聚梦一刻	Mother, lesbian girlfriend	
