= Dan Guerrero =

American college athletics administrator

- Born: November 10, 1951 (age 73); Tucson, Arizona, U.S.
- Education: Bachelor of Arts, UCLA, 1974; Master of Public Administration, California State University, Dominguez Hills, 1982
- Occupation: Athletic director
- Years active: 2002-2020
- Employer: UCLA

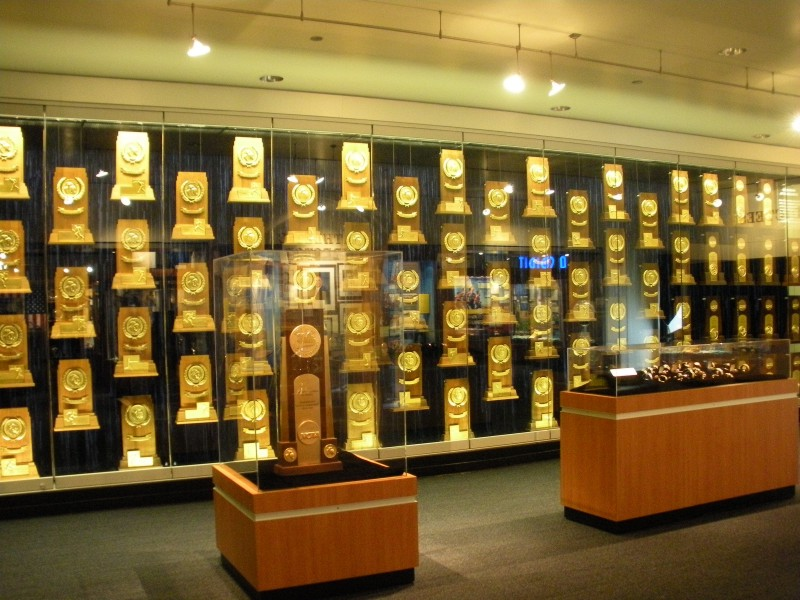
NCAA national championship trophies, rings, and watches won by UCLA teams

Dan Guerrero (born November 10, 1951) is an American former athletic director for the University of California, Los Angeles (UCLA). He also has served as the chairman of the Selection Committee for the NCAA Division I men's basketball tournament.

Guerrero began his career with California State University, Dominguez Hills, before moving to University of California, Irvine. He retired from his position as athletic director of UCLA in June 2020, after his contract expired, citing his health and a desire to spend more time with his family.

== Career ==
Guerrero's first stint as athletic director was at California State University, Dominguez Hills, where he served for five years (1988–92).

Guerrero next worked at UC Irvine, where he served as director of athletics for 10 years (1992-2002). In June 2002, while still at UC Irvine, he was named the 2001-02 Division I-AA/I-AAA West Region NACDA Athletic Director of the Year. During Guerrero's tenure, UCI experienced unprecedented activity in the area of athletic facilities development. In his final five years, Guerrero was involved in $38 million worth of newly constructed or renovated facilities. These projects included a newly renovated track and soccer complex, a new 64-meter competitive swimming pool, a new baseball stadium, and the Anteater Recreation Center, one of the premier recreation centers in the country.

=== UCLA ===
On April 25, 2002, Guerrero was named UCLA's director of athletics. In the last nine years, UCLA has finished second three times (2005–06, 2006–07, and 2007–08), third twice (2003–04 and 2004–05), fourth (2009–10), sixth (2002–03), 11th (2010–11), and 16th (2008–09) in the race for the Learfield Sports Directors' Cup.

In Guerrero's first year at UCLA (2002–03), UCLA won four NCAA titles (men's soccer, women's gymnastics, women's water polo, and women's softball). The Bruins placed third in men's golf, tied for third in men's tennis, and tied for fifth in women's golf and women's tennis. UCLA also earned six conference titles.

In 2003-04, the Bruins won four NCAA titles (women's outdoor track and field, softball, women's golf, and women's gymnastics). They also placed second in men's tennis, women's tennis, and men's golf, tied for third in women's soccer, tied for fifth in men's soccer and women's volleyball, and fifth in women's indoor track and field. In addition, the Bruins captured seven league titles.

In 2005-06, UCLA won two NCAA titles (men's volleyball and women's water polo) and placed second in men's basketball and women's soccer, tied for third in softball, tied for fifth in men's tennis, tied for seventh in men's golf, and tied for ninth in women's volleyball and women's tennis. UCLA also won the Vitalis Sun Bowl in football, captured seven conference championships, and made two postseason tournaments. In 2004-05, UCLA won three NCAA titles (men's water polo, men's tennis, and women's water polo) and placed second in women's soccer, men's volleyball, women's golf, and softball, tied for second in women's outdoor track and field, fourth in women's gymnastics, and tied for fifth in women's volleyball. UCLA also earned its first NCAA postseason appearance in women's rowing (varsity eight) and won eight conference championships.

In 2006-07, UCLA won one NCAA championship in women's water polo, the school's 100th NCAA team title, and placed second in men's soccer and women's tennis, third in women's golf, tied for third in men's basketball, women's soccer and women's volleyball, fourth in women's gymnastics, fifth in women's outdoor track and field, tied for fifth in men's tennis, seventh in men's golf and women's indoor track and field, ninth in men's outdoor track and field, and tied for ninth in baseball. UCLA played in its fifth straight bowl game in football and won four league titles.

In 2007-08, UCLA won three NCAA championships in women's water polo (fourth straight), women's tennis (first), and men's golf (second). The Bruins finished second in women's golf, tied for third in men's basketball (third straight Final Four), women's soccer (fifth straight College Cup), and men's tennis, fifth (tied) in women's volleyball and softball, and seventh in women's gymnastics. UCLA also played in its sixth consecutive bowl game and won four conference championships and two league tournaments.

In 2009-10, UCLA placed fourth in the Learfield Cup standings and won its 11th NCAA championship in softball and its sixth in women's gymnastics. The Bruins finished second in baseball and men's water polo, tied for third in women's soccer (seventh straight College Cup), fifth in women's water polo, tied for fifth in men's soccer and men's tennis, sixth in women's golf, tied for ninth in women's tennis, 12th in women's rowing, 16th in men's golf, tied for 17th in women's basketball and women's volleyball, and 19th in women's swimming. UCLA also won three conference titles and two league post-season tournaments and the football team won the EagleBank Bowl. In 2008-09, UCLA won its fifth consecutive NCAA women's water polo championship. The Bruins finished second in women's golf, tied for third in women's soccer (sixth straight College Cup) and men's tennis, placed seventh in women's gymnastics and ninth (tied) in softball, women's volleyball and women's tennis. UCLA also won six conference titles.

In 2010-11, UCLA won its 107th NCAA title in women's golf, placed second in women's gymnastics, third in women's water polo and women's tennis (tied), fifth (tied) in men's golf and men's soccer, ninth (tied) in men's tennis and women's soccer, 17th (tied) in men's basketball, women's basketball, baseball, softball, and women's volleyball, and 20th in women's swimming.

Guerrero led the negotiations that solidified the relationship between UCLA and the Rose Bowl, resulting in a $152 million renovation/restoration project that will benefit the Bruin football program for decades upon its completion in 2013. Furthermore, the $136 million Pauley Pavilion renovation project, spearheaded by Guerrero, is slated to be completed by the fall of 2012.

UCLA continued to enhance its athletic facilities, including the completion of the Bud Knapp Football wing of the Acosta Center, and the sports medicine and athletic performance centers in the same complex. A new golf practice facility and the Easton Softball Stadium renovation, benefiting the Bruins' golf and softball powers, respectively, were completed for the 2004-05 season. The installation of synthetic turf at Spaulding Field was completed in 2006, the final phase of the Acosta Center project (Olympic sport locker rooms) was completed in 2007 and the $16 million Spieker Aquatic Center was completed in the summer of 2009.

As of 2019, UCLA has 118 NCAA team championships, more than any other university except Stanford.

Entering the 2019–20 school year, Guerrero announced that he would retire in June 2020. At the time, UCLA had won 32 NCAA titles during his tenure, the most of any school under its current athletic director. The football program had never won a conference championship or appeared in a major bowl game under Guerrero. The men's basketball program did not add to their record 11 national titles, though they advanced to the Final Four three straight years under coach Ben Howland. His last major hire in men’s basketball, Mick Cronin, reached the Final Four in 2021 and found success for the program.

=== Other committees and awards ===
Guerrero has extensive experience in committee work at both the NCAA and conference level.

In 2004-05, he completed a multi-million dollar agreement with ISP Sports (now IMG College), a premier national collegiate sports marketing organization. He has also reorganized the External Relations area, integrating Corporate Sponsorships, Marketing, Development and Sports Information under one umbrella, in anticipation of a major revenue generating initiative designed to address capital project needs, operational support, and program endowments.

In June 2010, Guerrero completed a five-year term on the NCAA Division I Men's Basketball Committee. As the chair in 2009-10, he served on the NCAA Advisory Committee. He was also a member of the "College Basketball Partnership," a group formed by NCAA president Myles Brand that included many of the most influential people in the sport. He has also served as chair of both the Pac-10 Athletic Directors Committee, the Budget and Finance Committee, and numerous other Pac-10 committees. He is currently a member of the Nominating, Revenue Sharing, Men's Basketball Tournament, Bowl, and Rose Bowl Management committees. He has also served on other NCAA committees, the Baseball Academic Enhancement Committee, and at the time of his hire by UCLA was serving as the second vice president of the Division I-AAA Athletic Director's Association.

Guerrero was president of the National Association of Collegiate Directors of Athletics (NACDA) and a member of the NACDA Executive Committee from 2011–12, and served as president of the Division I Athletic Directors Association in 2010-11. In 2021 he was inducted into the NACDA Hall of Fame and received the James J. Corbett Award in 2022, the highest honor in collegiate athletics administration.

Guerrero is presently serving a second term on the Executive Board member of the National Consortium for Academics and Sport. As a result, he has spearheaded unprecedented growth in the Academic Support and Life Skills program at UCLA. During Guerrero's tenure (27 quarters), student-athletes earned 5,703 spots on the Director's Honor Roll (3.0 or higher grade-point average for a quarter) and student development programming, such as the creation of Wooden Academy, and community service activities for the program are at an all-time high.

Guerrero was named one of the nation's Top 100 Most Influential Hispanics by Hispanic Business Magazine (October 2004) and the May 5, 2003 issue of Sports Illustrated listed him #28 among the 101 Most Influential Minorities in Sports. He was one of 28 people whose photo was featured on that issue's cover.

In March 2011, Guerrero was recognized by the National Association of Basketball Coaches (NABC) at the Guardian of the Games Awards Show by presenting him with the Clifford Wells Award for distinguished service to the organization. In April, he was presented with the Crystal Eagle Award by CORO Southern California, an organization that provides training of civic and government leaders. In May 2011, he was honored by the Black Coaches and Administrators Association as by awarding him as the Dr. Myles Brand Administrator of the Year.

In addition to his most recent accolades, Guerrero has earned numerous honors in the past nine years. In June 2007, he was named the NACDA Division I West Region Athletic Director of the Year. His other honors include the UCLA Latino Alumnus of the Year (October 2002); Cal State Dominguez Hills' Alumnus of the Year (March 2003); and "Father of the Year" by the Father's Day Council of the American Diabetes Association (June 2003). On September 10, 2002, the Los Angeles City Council honored him with Dan Guerrero Day. He also became the first athlete in any sport at Banning (Wilmington, CA) High School to have his jersey (#8 in baseball) retired (April 2003).

== Education ==
Guerrero received his bachelor's degree in history from UCLA in 1974 on a baseball scholarship as a second baseman. He earned a master's degree in public administration in 1982 from California State University, Dominguez Hills.

== Personal life ==
Guerrero, who was raised in Wilmington, CA, was inducted into the UCLA Baseball Hall of Fame in 1996. Guerrero is married to the former Anne Marie Aniello and they have two grown daughters Jenna and Katie.
