= Brian Wang =

American wushu practitioner

Personal information
- Born: July 1, 1988 (age 38)

Sport
- Sport: Wushu
- Event(s): Changquan, Jianshu, Qiangshu
- University team: Illini Wushu; Columbia Wushu
- Team: US Wushu Team 2013-2023
- Coached by: various
Medal record
Men's Wushu Taolu
Representing United States
World Games
Gold medal – first place	2022 Birmingham	Jianshu+Qiangshu
Pan American Championships
Gold medal – first place	2014 San José	Qiangshu
Gold medal – first place	2018 Buenos Aires	Jianshu
Silver medal – second place	2016 Lubbock	Qiangshu
Silver medal – second place	2018 Buenos Aires	Changquan

Brian Wang Chien-wei (born July 1, 1988) is an American wushu taolu athlete.

== Career ==
Wang started training wushu at the age of five in Illinois, and later trained in New York and California. In 2013, he became a member of the US Wushu Team and made his continental debut at the 2014 Pan American Wushu Championships in San José, Costa Rica where he became the Pan American champion in qiangshu. Two years later, he won a silver medal in jianshu at the 2016 Pan American Wushu Championships. Wang then made his international debut at the 2017 World Wushu Championships in Kazan, Russia. A year later, he was the Pan American champion in jianshu and a silver medalist in changquan at the 2018 Pan American Wushu Championships in Buenos Aires, Argentina. With his high placements at the 2019 World Wushu Championships in Shanghai, China, Wang qualified for the 2020 Taolu World Cup in Tokyo, Japan which was ultimately cancelled due to the COVID-19 pandemic.

Three years later at the 2022 World Games in Birmingham, Wang won the gold medal in men's jianshu and qiangshu combined. After placing high in the 2023 World Wushu Championships in Fort Worth, Texas, he competed in the 2024 Taolu World Cup in Yokohama, Japan, finishing fourth in jianshu and sixth in qiangshu.

== Competitive history ==
Year	Event	CQ	JS	QS	AA
2014	Pan American Championships		11	1st place, gold medalist(s)	
2016	Pan American Championships	12		2nd place, silver medalist(s)	
2017	World Championships	11	9	DNS	
2018	Pan American Championships	2nd place, silver medalist(s)	1st place, gold medalist(s)		
2019	World Championships	13	6	6	
2020	did not compete due to COVID-19 pandemic				
2021	did not compete due to COVID-19 pandemic				
2022	World Games		1	1	1st place, gold medalist(s)
2023	World Championships	14	10	9	
2024	World Cup		4	6	
