= Adriano Lourenço =

Brazilian wushu practitioner

Adriano Lourenço da Silva
Personal information
- Born: October 6, 1986 (age 39) São Paulo, Brazil
- Occupation(s): Martial artist, athlete, coach
- Height: 1.62 m (5 ft 4 in)

Sport
- Sport: Wushu
- Event(s): Nanquan, Nandao, Nangun
- Team: Brazil Wushu Team
Medal record
Men's Wushu Taolu
Representing Brazil
Pan American Championships
Gold medal – first place	2008 São Paulo	Nandao
Gold medal – first place	2008 São Paulo	Duilian
Gold medal – first place	2010 Buenos Aires	Nangun
Gold medal – first place	2012 Monterrey	Nanquan
Gold medal – first place	2012 Monterrey	Nandao
Gold medal – first place	2012 Monterrey	Nangun
Gold medal – first place	2014 San José	Nanquan
Gold medal – first place	2014 San José	Nandao
Gold medal – first place	2014 San José	Nangun
Gold medal – first place	2016 Lubbock	Nanquan
Gold medal – first place	2016 Lubbock	Nandao
Gold medal – first place	2016 Lubbock	Nangun
Silver medal – second place	2008 São Paulo	Nangun
Silver medal – second place	2010 Buenos Aires	Nanquan
Silver medal – second place	2010 Buenos Aires	Nandao
Bronze medal – third place	2008 São Paulo	Nanquan

Adriano Lourenço da Silva (born October 6, 1986) is a retired wushu taolu athlete from Brazil. He is the most renowned athlete at the Pan American Wushu Championships of all time, having been a 12-time champion.

== Career ==
Lourenço grew up in a favela and started learning traditional Southern styles at the age of seven. After learning some kickboxing and capoeira, he started training wushu in 2003 under Thomaz Chan Hon Kit.

Lourenço made his international debut at the 2007 World Wushu Championships. As a wildcard, he competed in the 2008 Beijing Wushu Tournament and finished 9th in men's nanquan and nangun combined. The same year, he competed in the 2008 Pan American Wushu Championships and was the Pan American champion in nandao, a gold medalist in duilian, silver medalist in nangun, and bronze medalist in nanquan. Two years later at the 2010 Pan American Wushu Championships, he became the Pan American champion in nangun, and a silver medalist in nanquan and nandao. In the 2012, 2014 Pan American Wushu Championships, and 2016 Pan American Wushu Championships, he was a triple Pan American champion in all of his events. Lourenço's last competition was at the 2017 World Wushu Championships where he finished in-between 24th-26th in his events.
