= 2008 Pan American Wushu Championships =

7th edition of the Pan American Wushu Championships

- Venue: Tenis Clube de Campinas
- Location: São Paulo, Brazil
- Start date: July 16, 2008
- End date: July 20, 2008

The 2008 Pan American Wushu Championships was the 7th edition of the Pan American Wushu Championships. For the first time, the Pan American Junior Wushu Championships were organized (alongside the main championships).

== Medal table ==
* Host nation (Brazil)

Rank	Nation	Gold	Silver	Bronze	Total
1	Brazil (BRA)*	18	11	9	38
2	Canada (CAN)	11	5	6	22
3	Venezuela (VEN)	8	2	1	11
4	Mexico (MEX)	1	1	0	2
5	United States (USA)	0	6	3	9
6	Argentina (ARG)	0	5	5	10
7	Ecuador (ECU)	0	2	1	3
8	Peru (PER)	0	1	1	2
9	Chile (CHI)	0	1	0	1
10	Bermuda (BER)	0	0	3	3
11	Colombia (COL)	0	0	2	2
11	Dominican Republic (DOM)	0	0	2	2
13	Paraguay (PAR)	0	0	1	1
Totals (13 entries)		38	34	34	106

== Medalists ==
=== Taolu ===
==== Men ====
Event	Gold	Silver	Bronze
Changquan	Merrill Ong; Canada	Wilson Lui; Canada	Timothy Hung; Canada
Daoshu	Timothy Hung; Canada	Lucas Geller; United States	Hong Wen Wu; Argentina
Gunshu	Timothy Hung; Canada	Dennis Ta; United States	Wilson Lui; Canada
Jianshu	Merrill Ong; Canada	Alfred Hsing; United States	Alex Rodrigues; Brazil
Qiangshu	Merrill Ong; Canada	Alex Rodrigues; Brazil	Alfred Hsing; United States
Nanquan	Marcelo Yamada; Brazil	Hong Wen Wu; Argentina	Adriano Lourenço; Brazil
Nandao	Adriano Lourenço; Brazil	Marcelo Yamada; Brazil	João Ferreira; Brazil
Nangun	Marcelo Yamada; Brazil	Adriano Lourenço; Brazil	João Ferreira; Brazil
Taijiquan	Roque Bernardes; Brazil	Jara Pablo; Argentina	Cruz Javier; Argentina
Taijijian	Roque Bernardes; Brazil	Nicolas Sanches; Chile	Jara Pablo; Argentina
Duilian	Brazil; Adriano Lourenço; João Ferreira; Alex Rodrigues	Mexico; Pedro Cleto; Luis Felipe Álvarez Rosas	none awarded

==== Women ====
Event	Gold	Silver	Bronze
Changquan	Wei Hsin Lee; Canada	Margherita Cina; Canada	Selene Tsang; Canada
Daoshu	Samara Sampaio; Brazil	Sosa Natalia; Argentina	Emilia DaLamzo; Argentina
Gunshu	Selene Tsang; Canada	Stephanie Lim; United States	Stephanie Velazquez; Paraguay
Jianshu	Margherita Cina; Canada	Paula Amidani; Brazil	Stephanie Lim; United States
Qiangshu	Margherita Cina; Canada	Wei Hsin Lee; Canada	Paula Amidani; Brazil
Nanquan	Margareth Midori; Brazil	Natalie Gagnon; Canada	none awarded
Nandao	Samantha Tjhia; Canada	Margareth Midori; Brazil	Natalie Gagnon; Canada
Nangun	Larissa Oliveira Melão; Brazil	Natalie Gagnon; Canada	none awarded
Taijiquan	Koren Lui; Canada	Teresa Wong; United States	Tatiana Cruz; Brazil
Taijijian	Tania Sakanaka; Brazil	Teresa Wong; United States	Koren Lui; Canada
Duilian	Brazil; Paula Amidani; Samara Sampaio	none awarded	none awarded

=== Sanda ===
==== Men ====
Event	Gold	Silver	Bronze
48 kg	Joel Vilória; Venezuela	José Eudes; Brazil	Daniel Machuca; Peru
52 kg	Welington Silva; Brazil	none awarded	none awarded
56 kg	Wladimir Carvajal; Venezuela	Uelber Santos; Brazil	Paúl Aguilar; Ecuador
56 kg	Wladimir Carvajal; Venezuela	Uelber Santos; Brazil	Guillermo Lemos; Colombia
60 kg	Aglênio; Brazil	Royter Hernandes; Venezuela	Pastori Pablo; Argentina
60 kg	Aglênio; Brazil	Royter Hernandes; Venezuela	Sayd Ceballos; Colombia
65 kg	Angel Valderrama; Venezuela	Diego Caderon; Ecuador	Carlos Lami; Dominican Republic
65 kg	Angel Valderrama; Venezuela	Diego Caderon; Ecuador	Antônio C. Silva; Brazil
70 kg	Alvaro Cancino; Venezuela	Diego Jauregui; Peru	Pablo Stanelli; Brazil
70 kg	Alvaro Cancino; Venezuela	Diego Jauregui; Peru	Sentiw Woolridge; Bermuda
75 kg	Jesus Licet; Venezuela	Eduardo Barbosa; Brazil	Garon Wilkinson; Bermuda
80 kg	Roberto Neves; Brazil	Jamud Hector; Argentina	Shannon Finnegan; United States
80 kg	Roberto Neves; Brazil	Jamud Hector; Argentina	José Puello; Dominican Republic
85 kg	Ricardo Callardo; Mexico	Ricardo Castillo; Ecuador	Federico Capasso; Venezuela
85 kg	Ricardo Callardo; Mexico	Ricardo Castillo; Ecuador	Adgeferson Silva; Brazil
90 kg	Edson Silva; Brazil	none awarded	none awarded
90 kg+	Wellington Renato Felizatti; Brazil	Toledo Pablo; Argentina	Jermal Woolridge; Bermuda

==== Women ====
Event	Gold	Silver	Bronze
48 kg	Yasmeli Araque; Venezuela	Ednéia; Brazil	none awarded
52 kg	Evelyn Beleño; Venezuela	Regina; Brazil	Adele Wan; Canada
56 kg	Ana Fatia; Brazil	Heilyn Rios; Venezuela	none awarded
60 kg	Josimeire Custodio Jorge; Brazil	none awarded	none awarded
65 kg	Maria Cariaco; Venezuela	Rosimeire; Brazil	none awarded
