= 2010 Pan American Wushu Championships =

8th edition of the Pan American Wushu Championships

- Venue: CeNARD (capacity: 2,000)
- Location: Buenos Aires, Argentina
- Start date: October 7, 2010
- End date: October 10, 2010

The 2010 Pan American Wushu Championships was the 8th edition of the Pan American Wushu Championships. It was held in Argentina. Alongside the championships were the Pan American Junior Wushu Championships and the 1st Pan American Traditional Wushu & Chinese Martial Arts Festival.

== Medal table ==
* Host nation (Argentina)

Rank	Nation	Gold	Silver	Bronze	Total
1	Brazil (BRA)	16	15	3	34
2	United States (USA)	12	4	5	21
3	Venezuela (VEN)	7	5	7	19
4	Argentina (ARG)*	1	4	10	15
5	Chile (CHI)	1	2	5	8
6	Canada (CAN)	1	2	2	5
7	Peru (PER)	0	3	4	7
8	Mexico (MEX)	0	1	4	5
9	Paraguay (PAR)	0	1	2	3
10	Bermuda (BER)	0	0	1	1
Totals (10 entries)		38	37	43	118

== Medalists ==
=== Taolu ===
==== Men ====
Event	Gold	Silver	Bronze
Changquan	Donovan Hui; United States	Luiz Carlos; Brazil	Pengyu Fan; United States
Daoshu	Pengyu Fan; United States	Allan Colombo; Brazil	William Yan; Canada
Gunshu	Michael Tsai; United States	Hong Wen Wu; Argentina	Eugene Moy; United States
Jianshu	Donovan Hui; United States	Phillip Dang; United States	Elias Juarez; Argentina
Qiangshu	Donovan Hui; United States	Eric Duong; Canada	Jason Dung; United States
Nanquan	Marcelo Yamada; Brazil	Adriano Lourenço; Brazil	Pedro Firmino Dias; Brazil
Nandao	Marcelo Yamada; Brazil	Adriano Lourenço; Brazil	William Chen; United States
Nangun	Adriano Lourenço; Brazil	Pedro Firmino; Brazil	Stephen Au; Canada
Taijiquan	Roque Neto; Brazil	Jonathan Leung; Canada	Luis Pineda; Venezuela
Taijijian	Jonathan Leung; Canada	Roque Neto; Brazil	Luis Pineda; Venezuela
Duilian	Argentina; Matías Lere; Fermín Pereda	Paraguay; Antonio Ocampo; Lucas Caceres	Peru; Jorge Serrano; John Tinoco

==== Women ====
Event	Gold	Silver	Bronze
Changquan	Claudine Tran; United States	Samara Sampaio; Brazil	Paula Thais; Brazil
Daoshu	Claudine Tran; United States	Samara Sampaio; Brazil	Vanesa Benavidez; Mexico
Gunshu	Stephanie Lim; United States	Claudine Tran; United States	Vanesa Benavidez; Mexico
Jianshu	Tiffany Reyes; United States	Brenda Hatley; United States	Samantha Tsen; United States
Qiangshu	Tiffany Reyes; United States	Samantha Tsen; United States	Illerlin Gonzalez; Venezuela
Nanquan	Tiffany Reyes; United States	Margareth Midori; Brazil	Johana Montana; Venezuela
Nandao	Margaret Midori Sako; Brazil	Marcelina Cabezas; Chile	Johana Montana; Venezuela
Nangun	Marcelina Cabezas; Chile	Johana Montana; Venezuela	Karlee Yong; United States
Taijiquan	Tania Sakanaka; Brazil	Tatiana Cruz; Brazil	Pamela Ortega; Chile
Taijijian	Tania Sakanaka; Brazil	Tatiana Cruz; Brazil	Pamela Ortega; Chile

=== Sanda ===
==== Men ====
Event	Gold	Silver	Bronze
48 kg	Andrés Aponte; Venezuela	José Eudes Carneiro; Brazil	Yuri Flores Ruiz; Peru
52 kg	Yovier Canelon; Venezuela	Rubén Bustamante Roque; Peru	Matías Cuadros; Argentina
56 kg	Wallace Pires; Brazil	Juan Bencomo; Venezuela	Diego Penayo; Argentina
60 kg	Rafael Monçao; Brazil	David Hurtado Soto; Peru	David Clark; United States
60 kg	Rafael Monçao; Brazil	David Hurtado Soto; Peru	Endry Pinto; Chile
65 kg	Carlos Frota; Brazil	Marco Cerrón Quintanilla; Peru	Alexander Salcedo; Venezuela
65 kg	Carlos Frota; Brazil	Marco Cerrón Quintanilla; Peru	Juan Pablo Pastori; Argentina
70 kg	Joao Oliveira; Brazil	David Machado; Venezuela	Diego Huerto Jáuregui; Peru
70 kg	Joao Oliveira; Brazil	David Machado; Venezuela	Mariano Suarez; Argentina
75 kg	Jesus Licet; Venezuela	Juan Cárdenas Gutiérrez; Mexico	Garon Wilkinson; Chile
75 kg	Jesus Licet; Venezuela	Juan Cárdenas Gutiérrez; Mexico	Uilson Figuereido Oliveira; Brazil
80 kg	Alex Cisnes; United States	Hector Jamud; Argentina	Shannon Ford; Bermuda
80 kg	Alex Cisnes; United States	Hector Jamud; Argentina	Ricardo Gallardo Vaquero; Mexico
85 kg	Roberto Neves; Brazil	Basilio Formaniuk; Argentina	Felipe de Jesús Pantoja; United States
85 kg	Roberto Neves; Brazil	Basilio Formaniuk; Argentina	René Alexander Rodriguez; Paraguay
90 kg	Emerson Nogueira Almeida; Brazil	Carlos Salazar; Venezuela	Julio Villalba; Paraguay
90 kg	Emerson Nogueira Almeida; Brazil	Carlos Salazar; Venezuela	Carlos Escobar Díaz; Mexico
90 kg+	Edson Gonçalves Silva; Brazil	Joshue Córdoba; Venezuela	Matías Santana; Argentina
90 kg+	Edson Gonçalves Silva; Brazil	Joshue Córdoba; Venezuela	Juan Pablo Araoz; Chile

==== Women ====
Event	Gold	Silver	Bronze
48 kg	Yasmeli Araque; Venezuela	Edinéia Camargo; Brazil	Victoria Benitez; Argentina
52 kg	Maira Nazar; Brazil	Febe Gómez; Argentina	Yelka Torres Gallegos; Peru
52 kg	Maira Nazar; Brazil	Febe Gómez; Argentina	Evelyn Beleño; Venezuela
56 kg	Maderlyn Malave; Venezuela	Elizabeth Rivera; Chile	Sabrina Detoma; Argentina
56 kg	Maderlyn Malave; Venezuela	Elizabeth Rivera; Chile	Gabriela Cerrón Quintanilla; Peru
60 kg	Francelys Rivero; Venezuela	Josimeire Custodio Jorge; Brazil	Valeria Soria; Argentina
60 kg	Francelys Rivero; Venezuela	Josimeire Custodio Jorge; Brazil	Jessica Miramontes; United States
65 kg	Maria Cariaco; Venezuela	Rosimeire Nascimento; Brazil	Andrea Palomo; Argentina
75 kg	Tathiane Julio Aguiar; Brazil	none awarded	none awarded
