= 2006 Pan American Wushu Championships =

6th edition of the Pan American Wushu Championships

- Venue: University of Toronto - Athletic Centre
- Location: Toronto, Ontario, Canada
- Start date: July 22, 2006
- End date: July 23, 2006

The 2006 Pan American Wushu Championships was the 6th edition of the Pan American Wushu Championships. It was held from July 22-23, 2006 in Toronto, Ontario, Canada. This edition marked the first time that women's sanda was contested. Alongside this competition were a variety of contests for pushing hands sparring and traditional taijiquan.

== Medal table ==
* Host nation (Canada)

Rank	Nation	Gold	Silver	Bronze	Total
1	Brazil (BRA)	12	5	1	18
2	Canada (CAN)*	10	12	11	33
3	United States (USA)	7	5	7	19
4	Mexico (MEX)	3	3	0	6
5	Bermuda (BER)	0	2	2	4
6	Argentina (ARG)	0	1	1	2
7	Venezuela (VEN)	0	0	2	2
Totals (7 entries)		32	28	24	84

== Medalists ==
=== Taolu ===
==== Men ====
Event	Gold	Silver	Bronze
Changquan	Timothy Hung; Canada	Marvin Wong; Canada	Jackie Cho; Canada
Daoshu	Zach Caruso; United States	Timothy Hung; Canada	Justin Arca; Canada
Gunshu	Collin Lee; United States	Justin Arca; Canada	Timothy Hung; Canada
Jianshu	Terence Chan; Canada	Jonathan Louie; Canada	Chris Sexton; United States
Qiangshu	Chris Sexton; United States	Jonathan Louie; Canada	Ernst Law; Canada
Nanquan	Davide Cina; Canada	Hong Wen Wu; Argentina	Nathan Lam; Canada
Nandao	Jason Lui; United States	Joao Ferrerinda Silva Jr. Brazil	Nathan Lam; Canada
Nangun	Davide Cina; Canada	Nathan Lam; Canada	Maximillian Rodriguez; Argentina

==== Women ====
Event	Gold	Silver	Bronze
Changquan	Selene Tsang; Canada	Paula Amidani; Brazil	Ngan-Ha Ta; United States
Daoshu	Catherine Archer; United States	Ngan-Ha Ta; United States	Felicia Tsang; United States
Gunshu	Catherine Archer; United States	Joana Pei; United States	Selene Tsang; Canada
Jianshu	Tiffany Reyes; United States	Sarah Chang; United States	Tenyia Lee; United States
Qiangshu	Margherita Cina; Canada	Tiffany Reyes; United States	Sarah Chang; United States
Nanquan	Samantha Tjhia; Canada	Eunice Wong; Canada	Catherine Archer; United States
Nandao	Samantha Tjhia; Canada	Eunice Wong; Canada	Dianna Lang; Canada
Nangun	Eunice Wong; Canada	Samantha Tjhia; Canada	Renata de Faria Cordeiro; Brazil
Taijiquan	Tania Sakanaka; Brazil	Tatiana Cruz; Brazil	Flavia Ruggeri; Venezuela
Taijijian	Tania Sakanaka; Brazil	Tatiana Cruz; Brazil	Flavia Ruggeri; Venezuela

=== Sanda ===
==== Men ====
Event	Gold	Silver	Bronze
48 kg	Jose Endes Carneiro; Brazil	none awarded	none awarded
52 kg	Valdeci Souza; Brazil	Ramiro Lopez Sanchez; Mexico	none awarded
56 kg	Jason Chu; Canada	none awarded	none awarded
60 kg	Uelber Alves Santo; Brazil	Daniele Benavides Elizoado; Mexico	Bruce Tran; Canada
65 kg	Antonio Silva; Brazil	Jeff Chow; United States	Nathan Dill; Bermuda
70 kg	Pablo Stanelli; Brazil	Fernando Ramon Rodriguez; Mexico	Kevin Liu; United States
75 kg	David Albarran Alba; Mexico	Zack George; Canada	Garon Wilkinson; Bermuda
80 kg	Tiago Gomes; Brazil	Otero Smith; Bermuda	Tyler Yantha; Canada
85 kg	Emerson Almeida; Brazil	none awarded	none awarded
90 kg	Raul Moreno Arenas; Mexico	Ryan Whitehead; Canada	none awarded
90 kg+	Wellington Renato Felizatti; Brazil	Jeremy Okulski; Canada	none awarded

==== Women ====
Event	Gold	Silver	Bronze
52 kg	Maria Del Carmen D'lafuente Perez; Mexico	Ariana Paula Citolin Ortega; Brazil	Adele Wan; Canada
60 kg	Josimeire Custodio Jorge; Brazil	Talia Iris; Bermuda	none awarded
65 kg	Juliana Justino; Brazil	none awarded	none awarded
