= Alfred Hsing =

American actor and martial artist

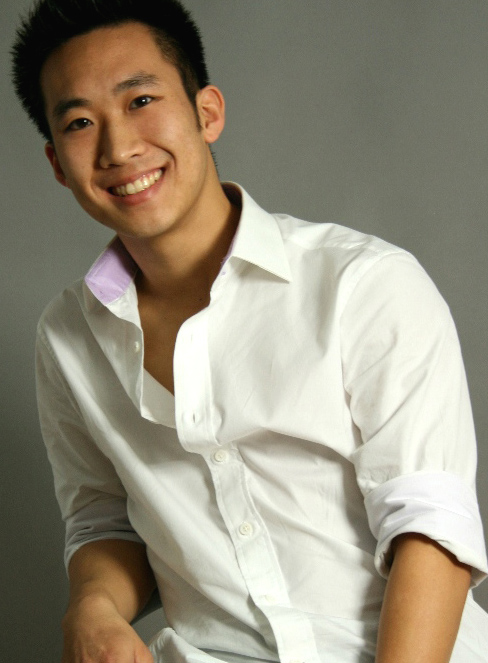

Personal information
- Born: November 23, 1983 (age 42) San Jose, California, United States
- Occupation(s): Actor, Martial artist, Stuntman

Chinese name
- Traditional Chinese: 邢思傑
- Simplified Chinese: 邢思杰
Transcriptions
Standard Mandarin
- Hanyu Pinyin: Xíng Sījié

Sport
- Sport: Wushu
- Event(s): Changquan, Jianshu, Qiangshu
- University team: UCLA Wushu
- Team: US Wushu Team (2007-2010)
Medal record
Representing United States
Men's Wushu Taolu
World Championships
Gold medal – first place	2009 Toronto	Jianshu
Pan American Championships
Silver medal – second place	2008 São Paulo	Jianshu
Bronze medal – third place	2008 São Paulo	Qiangshu

Alfred Hsing (born November 23, 1983) is an American martial artist, actor, and stuntman. After over a decade of intensive training in both America and China, Hsing won the first American gold medal in wushu taolu history at the 2009 World Wushu Championships held in Toronto, Ontario, Canada. Earlier that year, he made the US National Wushu Team where he was ranked 1st in the nation. Along with his career in martial arts, Hsing is also recognized as the Shaolin expert on Spike TV's show Deadliest Warrior.

== Early life ==
Hsing is of Taiwanese descent. He was born in San Jose, California on November 23, 1983.

== Wushu career ==
As a child Hsing always loved martial arts and would play fight with his brother. At the age of 15 he started formal training in Shaolin kung fu and wushu. Soon after he began learning wushu Hsing quickly won medals in local and national competitions including the Martial Arts World Cup, CMAT UC Berkeley, the US Wushu Nationals, and others. in 2002, Hsing joined UCLA Wushu and was the 2nd place men's all-around champion in the 2003 Collegiate Wushu Tournament.

In 2007, Hsing made the C Team of the USAWKF National Wushu Taolu Team. He then won a silver medal in jianshu and a bronze medal in qiangshu at the 2008 Pan American Wushu Tournament. In 2009, Hsing placed on the USA Wushu A Team as the men's national champion. At the 2009 World Wushu Championships in Toronto, Hsing became the first American athlete to win a gold medal in a taolu event, which he did so in male jianshu event. A year later in 2010, he took part in the changquan event at the 2010 World Combat Games as his last Wushu competition. After this, he began to focus on his acting and stunting career.

Though Alfred Hsing has learned many styles of martial arts through his years of training, his main events are changquan ("long fist"), jianshu (Straight Sword), and qiangshu (Spear). He is also proficient in drunken boxing, drunken sword, whip chain, emei daggers, fan, broadsword, staff, tai chi, and taijijian.

Hsing has been featured in Kung Fu Magazine and Masters Magazine (Winter 09) for his significant accomplishments in martial arts.

== Business career ==
After graduating from UCLA with a degree in economics, Computer Specialization, and minor in East Asian Languages, Hsing began work at Big 4 accounting firm KPMG. After gaining professional experience at KPMG, Hsing moved on to get a job in finance at City National Bank. In 2009, he quit his job to focus on training for the World Wushu Championships.

== Film career ==
Hsing has appeared on TV shows and films such as Ready Player One, HBO's Silicon Valley, NCIS: LA, CSI: NY, The Last Ship, Spike TV's Deadliest Warrior, and even in a Bollywood movie called Aakhari Decision.

Hsing has worked with Jet Li in The Sorcerer and the White Snake, Stephen Chow (whom he interviewed for MTV for the release of Kung Fu Hustle), MMA star Cung Le (whom he interviewed at the LA film festival for Bodyguards and Assassins), and Jackie Chan, whom he worked for as part of the Jackie Chan stunt team on Dragon Blade and demoed for at the premiere of The Spy Next Door.

In 2025, he played the role of Fu Sheng in Train Dreams.
