= 2002 Pan American Wushu Championships =

4th edition of the Pan American Wushu Championships

- Venue: University of the Andes, Social Sports Complex (capacity: 800)
- Location: Mérida, Venezuela
- Start date: June 27, 2002
- End date: June 30, 2002

The 2002 Pan American Wushu Championships was the 4th edition of the Pan American Wushu Championships. It was held from June 27-30, 2002, at the Social Sports Complex of the University of the Andes in Mérida, Venezuela.

For taolu events, separate events for the old (first) and new (second) compulsory routines were organized, similar to the 2001 World Wushu Championships.

== Medal table ==
* Host nation (Venezuela)

| Rank | Nation | Gold | Silver | Bronze | Total |
|---|---|---|---|---|---|
| 1 | United States (USA) | 19 | 8 | 3 | 30 |
| 2 | Venezuela (VEN)* | 9 | 8 | 11 | 28 |
| 3 | Canada (CAN) | 4 | 8 | 1 | 13 |
| 4 | Mexico (MEX) | 3 | 3 | 7 | 13 |
| 5 | Brazil (BRA) | 1 | 4 | 3 | 8 |
| 6 | Colombia (COL) | 1 | 1 | 2 | 4 |
| 7 | Argentina (ARG) | 0 | 1 | 0 | 1 |
| Totals (7 entries) | | 37 | 33 | 27 | 97 |

== Medalists ==
=== Taolu ===
==== Men ====
| Event | Gold | Silver | Bronze |
|---|---|---|---|
| Changquan (New) | An Nyuyen; United States | David Cina; Canada | Manvel Gutierrez; Mexico |
| Changquan (Old) | Justin Ma; United States | Rizqi Rachmat; United States | Orlando Polanco; Venezuela |
| Daoshu (New) | Justin Ma; United States | David Cina; Canada | Jason Lui; United States |
| Daoshu (Old) | Rizqi Rachmat; United States | Joaoferreia Silwa; Brazil | Alberto Jimenez; Venezuela |
| Gunshu (New) | Justin Ma; United States | Josimar Pereira; Brazil | Gary Luk; Mexico |
| Gunshu (Old) | Rizqi Rachmat; United States | Dervis Vilches; Venezuela | Alberto Jimenez; Venezuela |
| Jianshu (New) | An Nyuyen; United States; Sam Li; Canada | Merrill Ong; Canada; Adrian Ma; United States | Jorge Reyes; Mexico |
| Jianshu (Old) | Dervin Wilchez; Venezuela | Jonathan Churio; Venezuela | none awarded |
| Qiangshu (New) | An Nyuyen; United States | Sam Li; Canada | Merrill Ong; Canada |
| Qiangshu (Old) | Ivan Palana; Venezuela | Jonathan Churio; Venezuela | Orlando Polanco; Venezuela |
| Nanquan | Ted Fu; United States | Nathan Lam; Canada | Jason Lui; United States |
| Nandao | Ted Fu; United States | Nathan Lam; Canada | Israel Sanchez; Mexico |
| Nangun | Ted Fu; United States | Nathan Lam; Canada | Everaldo Palens; Brazil |

==== Women ====
| Event | Gold | Silver | Bronze |
|---|---|---|---|
| Changquan (New) | Catherine Luk; Canada | Cheryl Chang; United States | Paula Amidani; Brazil |
| Changquan (Old) | Emily Smeltzer; Venezuela | Amorina Zambrano; Venezuela | Eudiruar Qeiuter; Venezuela |
| Daoshu (New) | Catherine Luk; Canada | Contrevs Mileyq; Mexico | none awarded |
| Daoshu (Old) | Anreina Z. Venezuela | Vaileth A. Venezuela | Maiirian L. Venezuela |
| Gunshu (New) | Catherine Luk; Canada | Margherita Cina; Canada | Paula Amidani; Brazil |
| Gunshu (Old) | Anreina Z. Venezuela | Aracelis Meza; Venezuela | Jennifer Lacruz; Venezuela |
| Jianshu (New) | Sarah Chang; United States | Paula Amidani; Brazil | Cheryl Chang; United States |
| Jianshu (Old) | Anita Lopez; United States | Emily Smeltzer; United States | Evdiar Quirteo; Venezuela |
| Qiangshu (New) | Sarah Chang; United States | Cheryl Chang; United States | Palia Nana; Mexico |
| Qiangshu (Old) | Anita Lopez; United States | Emily Smeltzer; United States | Marelin Paliano; Mexico |
| Nanquan | Anita Lopez; United States | Nailetla Avenda; Venezuela | Mirlan Lozazo; Venezuela |
| Nangun | Deborah Yang; United States | none awarded | none awarded |
| Taijiquan | Deborah Yang; United States | Palia Nana; Mexico | none awarded |
| Taijijian | Deborah Yang; United States | none awarded | none awarded |

=== Sanda ===
==== Men ====
| Event | Gold | Silver | Bronze |
|---|---|---|---|
| 56 kg | Simon Moslaga; Venezuela | Mercio Silva; Brazil | Julian Gutierrez; Colombia |
| 60 kg | Jose Jimenez; Mexico | Carlos Aray; Venezuela | none awarded |
| 65 kg | Antonio Silva; Brazil | Oswaldo Guzman; Mexico | Alexander Lopez; Venezuela |
| 70 kg | Abilio Velasquez; Colombia | Viera Hiram; United States | none awarded |
| 75 kg | Gerardo Gutierrez; Mexico | Diego Ortiz; Colombia | none awarded |
| 80 kg | Jesus Diaz; Venezuela | Alexander Nakseushey; United States | John Juiro; Colombia |
| 85 kg | Edwin Aguilar; Mexico | Guillermo Conde; Argentina | Victor Medina; Venezuela |
| 90 kg | Luis Rada; Venezuela | none awarded | none awarded |
| 90 kg+ | Vicente Nieves; Venezuela | Michael Valbeuna; Colombia | Antonio Canon; Mexico |
