= 2018 Pan American Wushu Championships =

12th edition of the Pan American Wushu Championships

- Venue: Polideportivo Roberto Pando (capacity: 2,000)
- Location: Buenos Aires, Argentina
- Start date: October 30, 2018
- End date: November 5, 2018

The 2018 Pan American Wushu Championships was the 12th edition of the Pan American Wushu Championships. It was held from October 30 to November 5, 2018 at the Polideportivo Roberto Pando in Buenos Aires, Argentina.

It ran adjacent to the Pan American Junior Wushu Championships.

== Medal table ==
* Host nation (Argentina)

Rank	Nation	Gold	Silver	Bronze	Total
1	United States (USA)	11	9	3	23
2	Brazil (BRA)	10	9	4	23
3	Argentina (ARG)*	5	7	4	16
4	Peru (PER)	5	2	4	11
5	Canada (CAN)	4	0	0	4
6	Chile (CHI)	3	2	4	9
7	Dominican Republic (DOM)	2	0	2	4
8	Mexico (MEX)	1	2	6	9
9	Bermuda (BER)	1	0	2	3
10	Ecuador (ECU)	0	2	0	2
11	Colombia (COL)	0	1	2	3
11	Paraguay (PAR)	0	1	2	3
13	Venezuela (VEN)	0	1	0	1
14	Uruguay (URU)	0	0	1	1
Totals (14 entries)		42	36	34	112

== Medalists ==
=== Taolu ===
==== Men ====
Event	Gold	Silver	Bronze
Changquan	Max Wood-Lee; United States	Brian Wang; United States	Luis Felipe Álvarez Rosas; Mexico
Changquan (Compulsory)	Axel Vallejos; Argentina	Edison Alejandro Yañez Santis; Chile	none awarded
Daoshu	Max Wood-Lee; United States	Éverson Felipe Pereira da Silva; Brazil	Luis Felipe Álvarez Rosas; Mexico
Gunshu	Luis Felipe Álvarez Rosas; Mexico	Matthew Lee; United States	Benjamin Tran; United States
Jianshu	Brian Wang; United States	Benjamin Tran; United States	Martin Xiangdong Huang Hermida; Peru
Qiangshu	Jason Wong; United States	Ricardo Andre Velasquez Balta; Peru	Iván Aviña Méndez; Mexico
Nanquan	Rafael Viana dos Santos; Brazil	Bryan Kao; United States	Luis Fernando Bernal Cayo; Chile
Nandao	Rafael Viana dos Santos; Brazil	Bryan Kao; United States	Luis Fernando Bernal Cayo; Chile
Nangun	Rafael Viana dos Santos; Brazil	Jesus Ezequiel Alderete; Argentina	Ronaldo Rangel Rubio; United States
Taijiquan	Murray Cheung; Canada	Jorge Adrian Diaz; Argentina	none awarded
Taijijian	Murray Cheung; Canada	Jorge Adrian Diaz; Argentina	none awarded
Xingyiquan	Xiaoming Wang; United States	Sergio Minoru Tanoshi; Brazil	Ernesto Mauricio Ortiz Gomes; Peru
Shuangdao	Xiaoming Wang; United States	Hector Miguel Toledo; Chile	Caio Fernandes Martines; Brazil
Duilian	Peru; Ricardo Andre Velasquez Balta; Ernesto Mauricio Ortiz Gomez; Martin Xiangdong Huang Hermida	Paraguay; Carlos Alberto Britez Estigarribia; Juan Ramon Ruiz Rodas	none awarded

==== Women ====
Event	Gold	Silver	Bronze
Changquan	Jocelyn Gu; United States	Joanne Li; United States	Andrea Teodora Cruz Pedroso de Jesus; Brazil
Changquan (Compulsory)	Ariana Lorena Aguilar; Argentina	Camila Lucia Werle; Argentina	none awarded
Daoshu	Eva Lee; Canada	Andrea Teodora Cruz Pedroso de Jesus; Brazil	Joanne Li; United States
Gunshu	Eva Lee; Canada	Joanne Li; United States	Rebecca Chinn; United States
Jianshu	Jocelyn Gu; United States	Dusty Schmidt; United States	Brenda Silva dos Santos; Brazil
Qiangshu	Jocelyn Gu; United States	Denise Aviña Mendez; Mexico	Brenda Silva dos Santos; Brazil
Nanquan	Tamara Nataly Gallardo Valencia; Chile	Johana Ysabel Montaña Pacheco; Venezuela	none awarded
Baguazhang	Claudia Gabriela Mercado; Argentina	none awarded	none awarded
Shuangjian	Margarita Jeannette Escobar Davila; Argentina	none awarded	none awarded
Duilian	Chile; Camila Alejandra Cid Urtubia; Tamara Nataly Gallardo Valencia	none awarded	none awarded

=== Sanda ===
==== Men ====
Event	Gold	Silver	Bronze
48 kg	Darling Dalexis Ferreras Medina; Dominican Republic	none awarded	none awarded
52 kg	Fernando Antonio Torres Cuevas; Dominican Republic	Jose Jacinto Morante Bustamante; Ecuador	Yuri Flores Ruiz; Peru
56 kg	John Felix Tinoco Pajori; Peru	Antuan Isac Murillo Anchundia; Ecuador	Bra an Steven Var as Tapiero; Colombia
56 kg	John Felix Tinoco Pajori; Peru	Antuan Isac Murillo Anchundia; Ecuador	Salvaor Dominguez Marquez; Mexico
60 kg	Brandon Romulo Herreras Montalvo; Peru	Kristian Javier Verbel Pasternina; Colombia	Jose Carlos Felicione; Argentina
60 kg	Brandon Romulo Herreras Montalvo; Peru	Kristian Javier Verbel Pasternina; Colombia	Bastian Leonardo Angulo Arce; Chile
65 kg	Michael Jesus Herreras Montalvo; Peru	Johnathan de Souza Prado; Brazil	Alejandro Enrique Erazo Perez; Mexico
65 kg	Michael Jesus Herreras Montalvo; Peru	Johnathan de Souza Prado; Brazil	Agustin Gabriel Peralta; Argentina
70 kg	Caio Henrique Pitoli; Brazil	Lenin Estrada Liñan; Peru	Elian Andujar Sena; Dominican Republic
70 kg	Caio Henrique Pitoli; Brazil	Lenin Estrada Liñan; Peru	Gustavo Hernan Arias; Argentina
75 kg	João Antonio de Oliveira; Brazil	Pedro Garcia Tavares; Mexico	Dean Jones; Bermuda
75 kg	João Antonio de Oliveira; Brazil	Pedro Garcia Tavares; Mexico	Breuley Antonio Nuñez Reynoso; Dominican Republic
80 kg	Alex Cisne; United States	Alessandro Henrique Barros; Brazil	Johneiro Outerbridge; Bermuda
80 kg	Alex Cisne; United States	Alessandro Henrique Barros; Brazil	Jorge Andres Rincon Largo; Colombia
85 kg	Daniel Dionisio Madeira; Brazil	Livingston Mckenzie; United States	Patricio Alejandro Cordova Abarzua; Chile
85 kg	Daniel Dionisio Madeira; Brazil	Livingston Mckenzie; United States	Edgar Mauricio Marroquin Reyes; Mexico
90 kg	John Lyon Linhares Riberio; Brazil	Dario Alberto Carabajal; Argentina	Luciano Nicolas Ramos Gomez; Uruguay
90 kg+	Carlos Cavazos; United States	Aldebran Airton Valentim; Brazil	none awarded

==== Women ====
Event	Gold	Silver	Bronze
48 kg	Maria Florencia Paz; Argentina	Bianca Miranda Furtado; Brazil	none awarded
52 kg	Jazmin Atalia Navarrete Lagos; Chile	Ana Paula Chingoleo; Argentina	none awarded
56 kg	Beatriz Adrião Rustice Silva; Brazil	Sabrina Maria Detoma; Argentina	Ruth Miranda Borja; Paraguay
56 kg	Beatriz Adrião Rustice Silva; Brazil	Sabrina Maria Detoma; Argentina	Cynthia Mirella Mercedes Montes; Peru
60 kg	Gabriela Isabel Cerron Quintanilla; Peru	Ana Paula de Almeira Nogueria; Brazil	Andrea Noemi Palombo; Argentina
60 kg	Gabriela Isabel Cerron Quintanilla; Peru	Ana Paula de Almeira Nogueria; Brazil	Johana Montserrat Mallorquin Caceres; Paraguay
65 kg	Krista Dyer; Bermuda	Karen Pitoli; Brazil	none awarded
70 kg	Raine Cristina de Oliveira Martins; Brazil	none awarded	none awarded
75 kg	Beatriz Juliana Gomes Barros; Brazil	none awarded	none awarded
