= 2026 Pan American Wushu Championships =

14th edition of the Pan American Wushu Championships

- Venue: Sheraton Buenos Aires Hotel & Convention Center
- Location: Buenos Aires, Argentina
- Start date: October 7, 2026
- End date: October 12, 2026
- Website: Official website

The 2026 Pan American Wushu Championships is the 15th edition of the Pan American Wushu Championships. It is being held at the Sheraton Buenos Aires Hotel & Convention Center in Buenos Aires, Argentina from October 7 to 12, 2026. All adult events will occur from October 10 to 11.

The championships is being run adjacent to the Pan American Junior Wushu Championships as well as the Pan American Kung Fu Championships which were originally scheduled to be hosted in 2025 in Cancún, Mexico, but were cancelled.

== Medal table ==
* Host nation (Argentina)

Rank	Nation	Gold	Silver	Bronze	Total
1	United States (USA)	15	14	11	40
2	Brazil (BRA)	12	2	3	17
3	Argentina (ARG)*	4	5	6	15
4	Canada (CAN)	3	4	6	13
5	Dominican Republic (DOM)	2	3	5	10
6	Venezuela (VEN)	2	1	1	4
7	Mexico (MEX)	1	5	1	7
8	Bermuda (BER)	1	0	0	1
9	Chile (CHI)	0	2	2	4
10	Peru (PER)	0	1	3	4
11	Colombia (COL)	0	0	2	2
12	Ecuador (ECU)	0	0	1	1
Totals (12 entries)		40	37	41	118

== Medalists ==
=== Mixed ===
The results of this event were added to the combined medal table of the championships.

Event	Gold	Silver	Bronze
Jiti	United States; Shaun Zhang; Seth Burns; Leianna Yuen; Jonathan Payumo; Nathan Chao; Preston Land; Matthew Yum Ping Wong; William Vo	Argentina; Alexis Nahuel Rosales; Gaston Ezequiel Rosales; Nelso Carella; Ezequiel Agustin Moyano; Julieta Calderon; Melissa Calderon; Federico Diaz; Ludmila Aylen Rosales; Matheo Rolon; Emiliano Muñoz	none awarded

==== Men ====
Event	Gold	Silver	Bronze
Changquan	Ashton Wu; United States	Artur Ismagilov; Canada	Ashton Yim; United States
Daoshu	Nicholas Sun; United States	Bryan Gao; United States	Ryan Lee; United States
Gunshu	Ashton Yim; United States	Nicholas Sun; United States	Bryan Gao; United States
Jianshu	Seth Burns; United States	Alex Zhang; United States	André Velasquez Ricardo; Peru
Qiangshu	Ashton Wu; United States	Alex Zhang; United States	William Vo; United States
Nanquan	Stanley Meng; United States	Rasa Rahnema; Canada	Anthony Kwan; United States
Nandao	Jorge Tahan; Argentina	Stanley Meng; United States	Rasa Rahnema; Canada
Nangun	Jonathan Payumo; United States	Stanley Meng; United States	Nathan Chao; United States
Taijiquan	Yang Junchen; Canada	Gerardo Reynoso; Mexico	Zhang Hongyu; Canada
Taijijian	Gerardo Reynoso; Mexico	Yang Junchen; Canada	Zhang Hongyu; Canada
Taijishan	Yang Junchen; Canada	Cristian Alejandro Gonzalez; Argentina	none awarded
Duilian	Argentina; Alexis Nahuel Rosales; Gaston Ezequiel Rosales; Nelso Carella	United States; Shaun Zhang; Matthew Yum Ping Wong	Peru; Noland Brandon Huaylla; Jorge Alexander Copara

==== Women ====
Event	Gold	Silver	Bronze
Changquan	Rylee Kate Fung; United States	Amy Wong; United States	Cai Zihan; Canada
Daoshu	Antigone Tse; Canada	Allison Chew; United States	Cai Zihan; Canada
Gunshu	Julieta Calderon; Argentina	Allison Chew; United States	Cai Zihan; Canada
Jianshu	Rylee Kate Fung; United States	Cathy Rachel Chu; Canada	Hannah Folk; United States
Qiangshu	Rylee Kate Fung; United States	Arevalo Melina; Argentina	Brenda Silva dos Santos; Brazil
Nanquan	Leianna Yuen; United States	Luiza Julien Salvarani Fragoso; Brazil	Valeria Ayala; Peru
Nandao	Leianna Yuen; United States	Queenie Li; United States	Luiza Julien Salvarani Fragoso; Brazil
Nangun	Queenie Li; United States	Melissa Calderon; Argentina	Leianna Yuen; United States
Taijiquan	Aline Medeiros Nakamura; Brazil	none awarded	none awarded
Duilian	Argentina; Melissa Calderon; Julieta Calderon	United States; Rainbow LanHong Huang; Charisse Hung	

=== Sanda ===
==== Men ====
Event	Gold	Silver	Bronze
48 kg	Luis Miguel Hierro Jimenez; Dominican Republic	none awarded	none awarded
52 kg	Arghaion Matheus Ferreira dos Santos; Brazil	Rafael Atizol Espinal Orlando; Dominican Republic	none awarded
56 kg	Lucas Gabriel Quirino de Freitas; Brazil	Matias Benjamin Carreño Fernandez; Chile	Kevin Luis Moquete; Dominican Republic
56 kg	Lucas Gabriel Quirino de Freitas; Brazil	Matias Benjamin Carreño Fernandez; Chile	Jesús Caporaletti Nahuel; Argentina
60 kg	Erick de Carvalho Ferreira; Brazil	Valentín Santos Abd; Argentina	Jeffry Baez; Dominican Republic
60 kg	Erick de Carvalho Ferreira; Brazil	Valentín Santos Abd; Argentina	Pablo Carreño Fernandez Marcelo; Chile
65 kg	Spencer Meng; United States	Gabriel Pedroso de Almeida; United States	Saul Quiterio Hidalgo; Dominican Republic
65 kg	Spencer Meng; United States	Gabriel Pedroso de Almeida; United States	Victor Joaquín Carrizo; Argentina
70 kg	Lucas Luciano Queiroz Pereira; Brazil	Carlos Daniel Custodio Tiburcio; Dominican Republic	Vincent Meng; United States
70 kg	Lucas Luciano Queiroz Pereira; Brazil	Carlos Daniel Custodio Tiburcio; Dominican Republic	Luis María Ramos; Argentina
75 kg	João Antonio de Oliveira; Brazil	Jose Montaño; Venezuela	Massimo Cintron; United States
75 kg	João Antonio de Oliveira; Brazil	Jose Montaño; Venezuela	Antonio Duran Moya Yordaly; Dominican Republic
80 kg	Jonaelton Silva Carvalho; Brazil	Kevin Gallardo; Mexico	Elian Andujar Sena; Dominican Republic
80 kg	Jonaelton Silva Carvalho; Brazil	Kevin Gallardo; Mexico	Alfonso Bravo Chelen; Chile
85 kg	Jesus Manuel Alcantara de Jesus; Dominican Republic	Jesus Robles; Mexico	none awarded
90 kg	Agnaldo Arruda da Cruz; Brazil	Luis Contreras; Mexico	Sergio Orozco; Colombia
90 kg	Agnaldo Arruda da Cruz; Brazil	Luis Contreras; Mexico	Santiago Falcón; Argentina
100 kg	Luís Henrique Araujo dos Santos; Brazil	Dimitris Antonis Kontrafuris San Martín; Chile	none awarded

==== Women ====
Event	Gold	Silver	Bronze
52 kg	Correia da Silva Valdileia; Brazil	Lourdes Alejandra Sotelo; Dominican Republic	Jacob Riley Toppins; United States
56 kg	Katiuska Ledezma; Venezuela	Shea Scarborough; United States	Morena Lovera; Argentina
56 kg	Katiuska Ledezma; Venezuela	Shea Scarborough; United States	Jaqueline Palate Ocaña Graece; Ecuador
60 kg	Clara da Cunha Varela Maria; Brazil	Esther Aranda Atalia; Peru	María Barreto; Colombia
60 kg	Clara da Cunha Varela Maria; Brazil	Esther Aranda Atalia; Peru	Yeancarlin Parra; Venezuela
65 kg	Yosmary Lara; Venezuela	Itzel Rodriguez; Mexico	Irene Beatriz Inostroza Grodsky; Argentina
65 kg	Yosmary Lara; Venezuela	Itzel Rodriguez; Mexico	Kauane Rafaelly Raicheski Andrade dos Santos; Brazil
70 kg	Halanna Sarah Nogueira de Toledo; Brazil	none awarded	none awarded
75 kg	Krista Dyer; Bermuda	Daisa Mirel Costa Januario; Brazil	Leslye Flores; Mexico
