= 2014 Pan American Wushu Championships =

10th edition of the Pan American Wushu Championships

- Venue: Gimnasio Nacional (capacity: 4,000)
- Location: San José, Costa Rica
- Start date: September 5, 2014
- End date: September 7, 2014

The 2010 Pan American Wushu Championships was the 10th edition of the Pan American Wushu Championships. It was held in the Gimnasio Nacional in San José, Costa Rica from September 5 to 7, 2014.

== Medal table ==
* Host nation (Costa Rica)

Rank	Nation	Gold	Silver	Bronze	Total
1	Brazil (BRA)	11	12	6	29
2	United States (USA)	11	5	3	19
3	Canada (CAN)	5	6	7	18
4	Peru (PER)	3	2	3	8
5	Mexico (MEX)	2	3	3	8
6	Bermuda (BER)	1	1	1	3
7	Ecuador (ECU)	0	0	3	3
8	Costa Rica (CRC)*	0	0	1	1
8	Paraguay (PAR)	0	0	1	1
Totals (9 entries)		33	29	28	90

== Medalists ==
=== Taolu ===
==== Men ====
Event	Gold	Silver	Bronze
Changquan	Luis Felipe Álvarez Rosas; Mexico	Jason Chen Leung; Canada	Henry Nakata; Brazil
Changquan (compulsory)	Rolando Lee; United States	none awarded	none awarded
Daoshu	Luis Felipe Álvarez Rosas; Mexico	Henry Nakata; Brazil	Matthew Lee; United States
Gunshu	Eric Luong; Canada	Brandon Porfirio; Brazil	Luis Felipe Álvarez Rosas; Mexico
Jianshu	Gordon Tsai; United States	Kelvin Fan; Canada	Maxmilian Jokiti; Brazil
Qiangshu	Brian Wang; United States	Kelvin Fan; Canada	Gordon Tsai; United States
Nanquan	Adriano Lourenço; Brazil	Marcelo Yamada; Brazil	Gustavo Santos; Brazil
Nanquan (compulsory)	Jason Liu; United States	Anthony Chen; United States	Alfred Yang; Canada
Nandao	Adriano Lourenço; Brazil	Marcelo Yamada; Brazil	Jason Wong; United States
Nangun	Adriano Lourenço; Brazil	Pedro Firmino; Brazil	Stephen Au; Canada
Taijiquan	Murray Cheung; Canada	none awarded	none awarded
Taijijian	Murray Cheung; Canada	none awarded	none awarded
Duilian	Peru; Cesar Bustinza; Leonardo Terrones	none awarded	none awarded

==== Women ====
Event	Gold	Silver	Bronze
Changquan	Stephanie Lim; United States	Michele Santos; Brazil	Jeneva Beairsto; Canada
Changquan (compulsory)	Emily Hwang; United States	Dusty Schmidt; United States	Michele Cristina Da Silva; Brazil
Daoshu	Samara Sampaio; Brazil	Andrea Hung; Canada	Jiay Huang; Canada
Gunshu	Andrea Hung; Canada	Jeneva Beairsto; Canada	Jiay Huang; Canada
Jianshu	Stephanie Lim; United States	Jeneva Beairsto; Canada	Bryanne Chan; Canada
Qiangshu	Stephanie Lim; United States	Emily Hwang; United States	Paula Amidani; Brazil
Nanquan	Margareth Sako; Brazil	Marcela Polastri; Brazil	Ruth Landa Ccatamayo; Peru
Nanquan (compulsory)	Andrea Hung; Canada	Jessica Shyy; United States	none awarded
Nandao	Margareth Sako; Brazil	Marcela Polastri; Brazil	Ruth Landa Ccatamayo; Peru
Nangun	Jessica Shyy; United States	Marcela Polastri; Brazil	none awarded

=== Sanda ===
==== Men ====
Event	Gold	Silver	Bronze
56 kg	Lucas Luciano Queiroz Pereira; Brazil	Juan Bencomo; Peru	none awarded
60 kg	Jesus Herreras Montalvo; Peru	Erick Mendes; Brazil	Erick Hernandez; Mexico
60 kg	Jesus Herreras Montalvo; Peru	Erick Mendes; Brazil	Flor Robin; Ecuador
65 kg	Marco Cerrón Quintanilla; Peru	Jorge Martinez; Brazil	Pedro Jose Rolon Gonzalez; Paraguay
70 kg	Caio Henrique Pitoli; Brazil	Garret Howell; United States	Lenin Estrada Liñan; Peru
70 kg	Caio Henrique Pitoli; Brazil	Garret Howell; United States	Jorge Arburola; Costa Rica
75 kg	Sentwali Woolridge; Bermuda	Marcus Vinicius Segatin; Brazil	Karim Orozco; Mexico
75 kg	Sentwali Woolridge; Bermuda	Marcus Vinicius Segatin; Brazil	Damerji Najib; Canada
80 kg	Alejandro Cisne; United States	Gerardo Chaparro; Mexico	Daniel Dionisio Madeira; Brazil
80 kg	Alejandro Cisne; United States	Gerardo Chaparro; Mexico	Khalid Pitcher; Bermuda
90 kg	Guilherme Ribeiro Moura De Faria; Brazil	Cesar Zamarripa; Mexico	none awarded

==== Women ====
Event	Gold	Silver	Bronze
52 kg	Regina Auxiliadora Correa Ribeiro; Brazil	Carolina Haro; Mexico	Eduarte Evelyn; Ecuador
56 kg	Maristela Alves Do Nascimento; Brazil	Gabriela Cerron Quintanilla; Peru	Carrasco Maria; Ecuador
60 kg	Ragan Beedy; United States	Talia Iris; Bermuda	none awarded
