= 2016 Pan American Wushu Championships =

11th edition of the Pan American Wushu Championships

- Venue: Lubbock Memorial Civic Center (capacity: 2,995)
- Location: Lubbock, Texas, United States
- Start date: August 12, 2016
- End date: August 14, 2016

The 2016 Pan American Wushu Championships was the 11th edition of the Pan American Wushu Championships. It was held from August 12-14, 2016 at the Lubbock Memorial Civic Center in Lubbock, Texas, United States.

It ran adjacent to the Pan American Junior Wushu Championships.

== Medal table ==
* Host nation (United States)

Rank	Nation	Gold	Silver	Bronze	Total
1	Brazil (BRA)	18	7	4	29
2	United States (USA)*	13	13	5	31
3	Mexico (MEX)	5	5	9	19
4	Canada (CAN)	3	2	0	5
5	Bermuda (BER)	1	5	1	7
6	Chile (CHI)	1	0	0	1
7	Argentina (ARG)	0	0	1	1
7	Barbados (BAR)	0	0	1	1
7	Colombia (COL)	0	0	1	1
7	Puerto Rico (PUR)	0	0	1	1
7	Trinidad and Tobago (TTO)	0	0	1	1
Totals (11 entries)		41	32	24	97

== Medalists ==
=== Taolu ===
==== Men ====
Event	Gold	Silver	Bronze
Changquan	Luis Felipe Álvarez Rosas; Mexico	Samuel Montalvo; United States	Henry Yuji Nakata; Brazil
Changquan (Compulsory)	Matthew Lee; United States	Eiryo George Rodolfo Sumi Okura; Brazil	Jonathan Rivera Campudoni; Puerto Rico
Daoshu	Henry Yuji Nakata; Brazil	Brandon Porfirio da Silva; Brazil	Luis Felipe Álvarez Rosas; Mexico
Gunshu	Ariel Mancilla; Chile	Brandon Porfirio da Silva; Brazil	Samuel Montalvo; United States
Jianshu	Sean Sumida; Brazil	Brian Wang; United States	Juan Carlos Gomez Perez; Mexico
Qiangshu	Maximilian Jokiti Kobayashi; Brazil	Sean Sumida; Brazil	Iván Aviña Méndez; Mexico
Nanquan	Adriano Lourenço; Brazil	Henry Kenichi Sato; Brazil	Lincoln Lira Rodriguez; Mexico
Nanquan (Compulsory)	Kevin Qin; United States	Faris Maaliki; United States	none awarded
Nandao	Adriano Lourenço; Brazil	Lincoln Lira Rodriguez; Mexico	Kevin Qin; United States
Nangun	Adriano Lourenço; Brazil	Alex Tran; United States	Gustavo Henrique Coury dos Santos; Brazil
Taijiquan	Benson Lin; United States	Gerardo Reynoso Romero; Mexico	Jhambler Acevedo Moreno; Colombia
Taijijian	Benson Lin; United States	Gerardo Reynoso Romero; Mexico	none awarded
Xingyiquan	Kevin Ricardo Lira Cortes; Mexico	none awarded	none awarded
Dadao	Kevin Ricardo Lira Cortes; Mexico	Faris Maaliki; United States	none awarded

==== Women ====
Event	Gold	Silver	Bronze
Changquan	Michele Dos Santos; Brazil	Stephanie Lim; United States	Samara Gomes Sampaio; Brazil
Changquan (Compulsory)	Isabella Miller; United States	Bianca Go; Canada	Jessica Do Nascimento Cuzine; Brazil
Daoshu	Samara Gomes Sampaio; Brazil	none awarded	none awarded
Gunshu	Caitlin Escudero; United States	none awarded	none awarded
Jianshu	Stephanie Lim; United States	Michele Dos Santos; Brazil	Denise Aviña Mendez; Mexico
Qiangshu	Maria Cecilia Alvarez Rosas; Mexico	Denise Aviña Mendez; Mexico	Dusty Schmidt; United States
Nanquan	Marcela Polastri Thereza; Brazil	none awarded	none awarded
Nandao	Marcela Polastri Thereza; Brazil	none awarded	none awarded
Nangun	Marcela Polastri Thereza; Brazil	none awarded	none awarded
Taijiquan	Wei Jen Lee; Canada	Teresa Wong; United States	Catherine Earle; Trinidad and Tobago
Taijijian	Wei Jen Lee; Canada	Teresa Wong; United States	none awarded
Baguazhang	Isabella Miller; United States	none awarded	none awarded
Shuangjian	Bianca Go; Canada	none awarded	none awarded

=== Sanda ===
==== Men ====
Event	Gold	Silver	Bronze
56 kg	Jose Velazquez; Mexico	Jeff Cornelius; United States	none awarded
60 kg	Lucas Pereira; Brazil	Jose Lino Gutierrez; Mexico	Adam Henriquez; United States
65 kg	Paris Moran; United States	Bruce Tran; Canada	Adrian Zermeño; Mexico
70 kg	Caio Henrique Pitoli; Brazil	Gabriel Echavarry; United States	Lemar Tull; Barbados
70 kg	Caio Henrique Pitoli; Brazil	Gabriel Echavarry; United States	Zain Philpott; Bermuda
75 kg	Braulio Junior; Brazil	Sentwali Woolridge; Bermuda	Keith Perez; Mexico
75 kg	Braulio Junior; Brazil	Sentwali Woolridge; Bermuda	Maximiliano Boyer; Argentina
80 kg	Daniel Madeira; Brazil	Keanu Wilson; Bermuda	Luis David Aguayo; Mexico
80 kg	Daniel Madeira; Brazil	Keanu Wilson; Bermuda	Tomas Rios; United States
85 kg	Livingston Mckenzie; United States	Jose Heldes Junior; Brazil	none awarded
90 kg	Ricardo Saldanha; Brazil	Cory Johnson; United States	none awarded
90 kg+	Christian Morales; United States	Jermal Woolridge; Bermuda	none awarded

==== Women ====
Event	Gold	Silver	Bronze
48 kg	Manoela Vieria; Brazil	Sarah Yoang; United States	none awarded
52 kg	Edinea Camargo; Brazil	Catarina Gutierrez; United States	Yuliana Gonzales; Mexico
60 kg	Morganne Thompson; United States	Talia Iris; Bermuda	none awarded
65 kg	Emily Dias; United States	Krista Dyer; Bermuda	none awarded
