= World Kungfu Championships =

- Genre: Global sports event
- Frequency: Biennial
- Inaugurated: 2004
- Most recent: 2023
- Organiser: IWUF
- Website: Official website

The World Kungfu Championships, previously known as the World Traditional Wushu Championships, is an international sports championship hosted by the International Wushu Federation (IWUF) for the sport of taolu of various traditional disciplines. Thousands of competitors of various age groups compete on behalf of their national federations through qualification. The competition has been held biennially since 2004.

== Editions ==
Year	Edition	Location
2004	1	Zhengzhou, China
2006	2	Zhengzhou, China
2008	3	Shiyan, China
2010	4	Shiyan, China
2012	5	Huangshan, China
2014	6	Chizhou, China
2017	7	Emeishan, China
2019	8	Emeishan, China
2023	9	Emeishan, China
2025	10	Emeishan, China

== History ==
In 2004, the IWUF hosted the World Traditional Wushu Festival in Zhengzhou as a means of organizing a competition for traditional and non-standard wushu taolu events. Over 2,000 athletes from 60 countries participated in the first rendition.

The event was then renamed to the World Traditional Wushu Championships and the 2006 edition hosted a mock competition for the International Olympic Committee ahead of the 2008 Beijing Wushu Tournament.

There was a three-year gap between 2014 and 2017 where the event was renamed to the World Kungfu Championships. The 2017 editions onward have been based in Emeishan City. The size of the competition has grown dramatically and the quality of the organization has improved.
