= Anteater Recreation Center =

Gym facility part of University of California, Irvine

Coordinates: 33.64342°N 117.82784°W

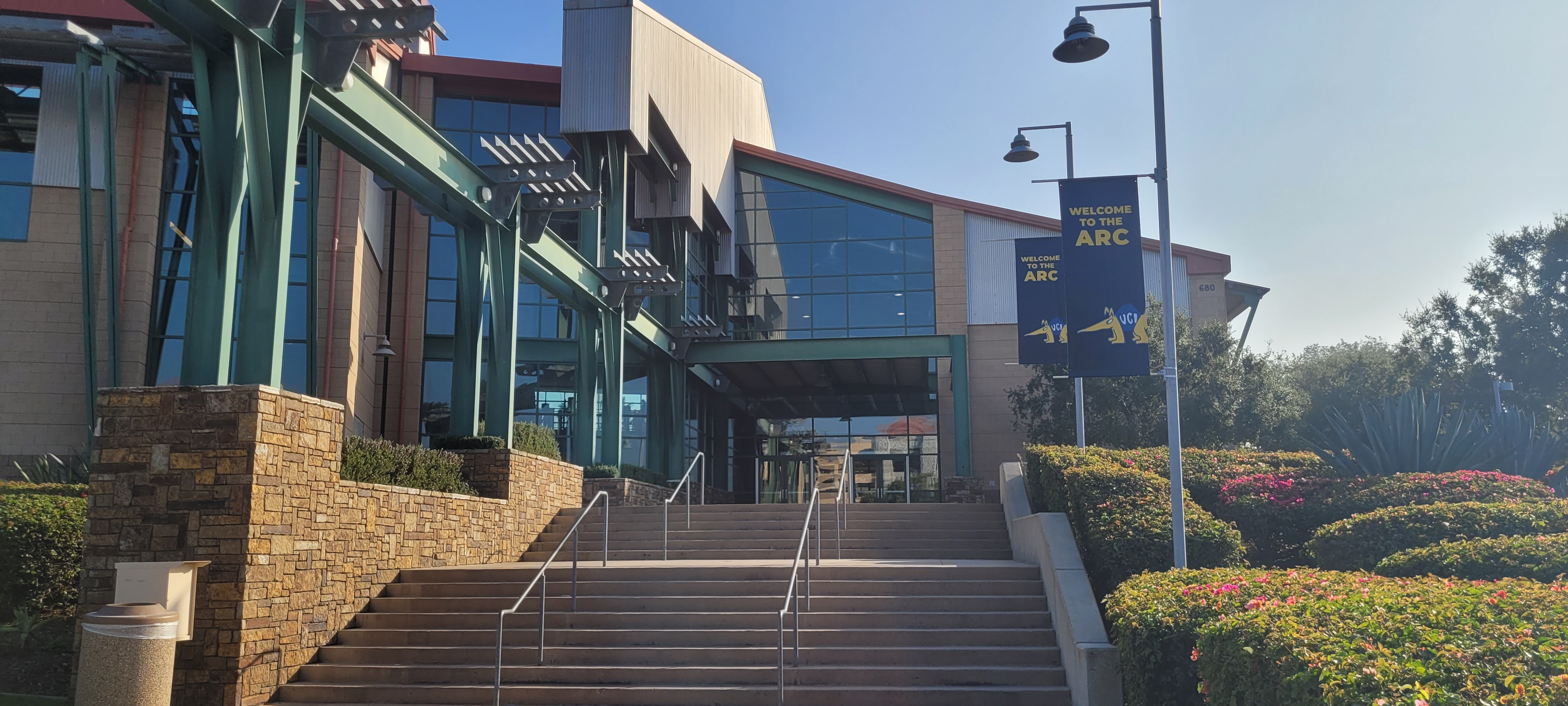
The entrance to the ARC in 2025

The Anteater Recreation Center (ARC) is an 89,000-square-foot (8,300 m^{2}) indoor gym located at the University of California, Irvine (UCI); the anteater is the mascot of the UC Irvine athletics team. Operated by the Campus Recreation department, the ARC is accessible to UCI students, faculty, staff, alumni, and other university affiliates, including their spouses.

The facility was designed by Langdon Wilson Architecture. It opened in January 2000, replacing older, cramped recreational facilities at the school's older gym, Crawford Hall. Built at a cost of $26 million, it was funded by a student referendum approved in May 1996, when UCI students voted to pay an additional $88 per quarter to fund the center and other athletic and recreational facilities. The positive reception for the new center led students at other University of California campuses (such as UCLA) to push for similar improvements in their recreational facilities.

The facility has been the setting for several Guinness world record events, including a 4,448-participant dodgeball game in 2011 and a 3,875-combatant water pistol fight in 2013.

== Facilities ==
ARC facilities include:

- The main gym, which features three basketball or volleyball courts or nine badminton courts and utilizes hanging dividers to separate each court
- A fitness lab, consisting of state of the art cardiovascular equipment, weight machines, and free-weights, as well as eight flat screen televisions
- An indoor jogging track with a clock timer and rubber flooring
- A 36’ high rock wall for beginning to advanced climbers
- Three glass-enclosed racquetball courts
- Five activity rooms for various fitness classes, clinics, and programs
  - Physical Forum is the largest activity room and is home to group exercise classes, like Step, Pump N’ Sculpt, Aerobics, and Zumba.
  - Sports Studio has matted flooring and can be used for martial arts, wrestling, and stretching
  - Activity Annex is the main facility for table tennis, fencing, and instructional dance classes
  - Workout Shop is utilized by yoga, kendo, capoeira, and belly dance classes
  - Training Zone offers studio cycling, meditation, and yoga classes.
- A back court gym, a 7,000-square-foot (650 m^{2}) gym with rounded corners, team dugouts, and inset goals, perfect for floor hockey and indoor soccer
- A newly added Wellness Lab, geared towards functional training and featuring a Kinesis Wall and kinesis circuit machines, as well as cardio equipment and free weights and ten flat screen televisions
- An aquatics plaza with a lap pool measuring 25 meters in width by 22.86 metres (25 yards) in length
- ARC fields, a 25-acre (100,000 m^{2}) outdoor complex, for sports such as softball, soccer, football, rugby, lacrosse, basketball, roller hockey, and tennis
- Exercise testing rooms, where various fitness tests, such as "Bod Pods" and "VO2 Submax Tests", are conducted
- Massage therapy rooms with fully adjustable beds
- A test kitchen and classroom that is used for demonstration and cooking classes
- ARC Bar, offering fresh smoothies and light snacks

== Services ==
ARC services include:

- Classes and clinics that follow a non-credit, class format for learning or developing sports
- Club sports directed to clubs centered on interest in one sport or fitness activity and involves competition among other collegiate club teams
- Intramural sport leagues designed for student, faculty, and staff competition
- Team Up and Odyssey High Ropes Course activities
- Fitness and wellness programs designed to support participants' physical exercise and health goals
- Certified personal training
- Kinesis circuit training
- Pilates reformer
- Exercise testing
- Massage
- Outdoor adventures, including kayaking and paddle boarding, that provide an opportunity to overcome a psychological or physical challenge or barrier
- Sailing
- CPR/first aid classes
- Gear Up, where ARC participants can check out equipment, including basketballs, racquets, and shower towels

== Intramural sports ==
- The ARC offers many intramural sports every quarter (fall, winter, spring, and summer) for all students, staff, and faculty, with an ARC membership, which are divided into leagues and tournaments.
- Intramural sports are structured sport leagues and tournaments, which are designed for the everyday athlete. All activities are divided into different divisions of skill and competitiveness.
- Fall quarter sports: arena soccer, flag football, volleyball, 3-on-3 basketball, coed basketball, tennis singles, 7 on 7 soccer, dodgeball, ultimate frisbee, and racquetball singles
- Winter quarter sports: soccer, floor hockey, coed reverse volleyball, basketball, dodgeball, softball, wrestling, and track
- Spring quarter sports: coed indoor soccer, coed volleyball, softball, "Call Your Own" basketball, racquetball singles, swim, bowling, and water polo
- Summer quarter sports: softball, 4 on 4 coed volleyball, 3 on 3 basketball, 7 on 7 soccer, and kickball
- In order to put in a team for intramural sports, one must pay a fee and make a roster complete with names, ID numbers, and three phone numbers and emails in case of rescheduling conflicts, etc. This can be done at the sales desk on the second floor of the ARC.
- League games start in week 3 of the quarter and continue to week 7 or 8.
- Playoffs begin in week 8 or 9 until week 10 or whenever necessary to finish the season.
- League games take place on weekdays and some Sundays, and tournaments take place on weekdays to some Saturdays and Sundays.
- Games are officiated by trained student officials.

== See also ==
- Student activities and traditions at UC Irvine
