= 2024 Pan American Wushu Championships =

14th edition of the Pan American Wushu Championships

- Venue: Santa Clara Convention Center
- Location: Santa Clara, California, United States
- Start date: August 29, 2024
- End date: September 2, 2024
- Website: Official website

The 2024 Pan American Wushu Championships was the 14th edition of the Pan American Wushu Championships. It was held at the Santa Clara Convention Center in Santa Clara, California, United States from August 29 to September 2, 2024. It ran adjacent to the Pan American Junior Wushu Championships and the 1st Pan American Open Wushu Tournament. All the events of the adult competition took place on August 31.

The competition was organized by the United States of America Wushu Kungfu Federation under Anthony Goh.

== Medal table ==
* Host nation (United States)

Rank	Nation	Gold	Silver	Bronze	Total
1	United States (USA)*	18	14	5	37
2	Brazil (BRA)	8	2	3	13
3	Canada (CAN)	4	4	4	12
4	Bermuda (BER)	3	0	2	5
5	Mexico (MEX)	2	2	1	5
6	Chile (CHI)	0	2	0	2
7	Argentina (ARG)	0	1	1	2
Totals (7 entries)		35	25	16	76

== Medalists ==
=== Taolu ===
==== Men ====
Event	Gold	Silver	Bronze
Changquan	Sen Gao; United States	William Vo; United States	Andrew Compton; Canada
Daoshu	Sen Gao; United States	Rex Lam; Canada	Caleb Akai; Canada
Gunshu	Sen Gao; United States	Seth Burns; United States	Rex Lam; Canada
Jianshu	William Vo; United States	Seth Burns; United States	Ivan Aviña; Mexico
Qiangshu	Paco Huang; Canada	Andrew Compton; Canada	William Vo; United States
Nanquan	Gabriel Komaziro Nakamura; Brazil	Rasa Rahnema; Canada	Rafael Viana dos Santos; Brazil
Nandao	Rafael Viana dos Santos; Brazil	Luis Bernal Cayo; Chile	Rasa Rahnema; Canada
Nangun	Gabriel Komaziro Nakamura; Brazil	Luis Bernal Cayo; Chile	Rafael Viana dos Santos; Brazil
Taijiquan	Ethan Zhu; United States	Luke Tian; United States	none awarded
Taijijian	Luke Tian; United States	Ethan Zhu; United States	none awarded
Duilian	United States; Sen Gao; William Vo	none awarded	none awarded

==== Women ====
Event	Gold	Silver	Bronze
Changquan	Erica Li; Canada	Crystal Chang; United States	Dusty Schmidt; United States
Daoshu	Crystal Chang; United States	Michelle Huang; United States	Julieta Calderon; Argentina
Gunshu	Emily Jian; United States	Crystal Chang; United States	Angela Flavia da Silva; Brazil
Jianshu	Erica Li; Canada	Michele Silva dos Santos; Brazil	Emily Jian; United States
Qiangshu	Erica Li; Canada	Jean Hoang; United States	Dusty Schmidt; United States
Nanquan	Leianna Yuen; United States	Queenie Li; United States	Luna Franco; United States
Nandao	Queenie Li; United States	Luna Franco; United States	none awarded
Nangun	Leianna Yuen; United States	Queenie Li; United States	none awarded
Taijiquan	Amelia Si; United States	none awarded	none awarded
Taijijian	Amelia Si; United States	none awarded	none awarded
Duilian	none awarded	none awarded	none awarded

=== Sanda ===
==== Men ====
Event	Gold	Silver	Bronze
52 kg	Lucas Gabriel Quirino de Freitas; Brazil	none awarded	none awarded
56 kg	Erick de Carvalho Ferreira; Brazil	none awarded	none awarded
60 kg	Ryan Liu; United States	none awarded	none awarded
65 kg	Vincent Meng; United States	Gabriel Pedroso de Almieda; Brazil	none awarded
70 kg	Hector Torres; Mexico	Andrew Tate; United States	Che Durham; Bermuda
75 kg	João Antonio de Oliveira; Brazil	Abdiel Ferdinand Hyacienth; Canada	Ricardo Alexis Gallardo; Mexico
75 kg	João Antonio de Oliveira; Brazil	Abdiel Ferdinand Hyacienth; Canada	Cole Durham; Bermuda
80 kg	Kevin Gallardo; Mexico	Roman Navarro; United States	none awarded
85 kg	Che Beane; Bermuda	Hector Vazquez; Mexico	none awarded
90 kg+	Andrew Bowen-Albo; United States	none awarded	none awarded

==== Women ====
Event	Gold	Silver	Bronze
52 kg	Edinea Prado Camargo; Brazil	Lourdes Alejandra Sotelo; Argentina	none awarded
56 kg	Riley Toppins; United States	none awarded	none awarded
60 kg	Nathalia Briquezi Silva; Brazil	Atenas Vazquez; Mexico	none awarded
65 kg	Krista Dyer; Bermuda	none awarded	none awarded
70 kg	Ryah Symonds; Bermuda	none awarded	none awarded
