= Tania Sakanaka =

Brazilian academic & athlete

Medal record

Women's Wushu Taolu

Representing Brazil

World Wushu Championships
Gold medal – first place	2015 Jakarta	Baguazhang

Dr Tania Sakanaka is a sports science academic and a Brazilian taijiquan athlete. At the 2015 World Wushu Championships, she became the inaugural world champion in women's baguazhang.

== Early life ==
Dr Sakanaka was born in Brazil to Hawaiian mother (Chinese/Japanese ancestry) and a Brazilian father (Japanese ancestry).

== Career and research ==
=== Competitive wushu ===
Tania started training in tai chi in 1995, with Prof. Marcelo Martinelli, in the extension course offered by the Faculty of Physical Education of State University of Campinas, Brazil. Next, she moved to China in 2004 (the country of origin of wushu) for further training at Beijing Sport University under the supervision of masters including Li Yanjun, Zong Weijie, Hauang Kanghui and Wang Xiaona.

Tania became an athlete for the Brazilian Kungfu Wushu National Team since 2003. She became a double medalist at the World Traditional Wushu Championships and a silver medalist at the 1st World Taijiquan Championships in 2014. A year later, she competed in the 2015 World Wushu Championships in Jakarta, Indonesia, and became the world champion in women's baguazhang.

=== Academic career ===
The focus of Dr Sakana's research is biomechanics. Her masters research (2009) looked at tai chi (taijiquan) pelvic rotational movement in Yang style louxiaobu, under the supervision of Prof Xu Weijun at Beijing Sport University, China.

Tania completed her doctoral research titled 'Causes of variation in intrinsic ankle stiffness and the consequences for standing' from the University of Birmingham in 2017 under the supervision of Dr Martin Lakie and Dr Raymond Reynolds. Her PhD research has produced two peer reviewed papers so far (on 2018).

Following her post-doctoral work at State University of Campinas, São Paulo, Brazil, She is currently working at Manchester Metropolitan University researching about biomechanism in children with cerebral palsy (on 2023).
