= United States of America Wushu Kungfu Federation =

American sport governing body

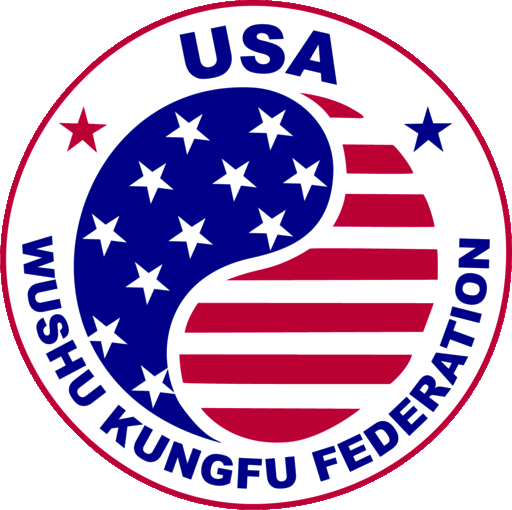
- Sport: Wushu
- Abbreviation: USAWKF
- Founded: August 21, 1993
- Affiliation: International Wushu Federation
- Regional affiliation: Pan American Wushu Federation
- Headquarters: Baltimore, Maryland, U.S.
- President: Anthony Goh
- Vice president: C. P. Ong

Official website
- usawkf.org
- (United States)

The United States of America Wushu Kungfu Federation (USAWKF) is the governing body of wushu-kungfu in the United States. The USAWKF manages and selects the members of the US Wushu Team to compete in various international competitions including the World Wushu Championships, World Junior Wushu Championships, World Kungfu Championships, and the World Taijiquan Championships. The USAWKF also develops regional and national activities relating to Wushu, and has had great influence on how wushu taolu and sanda events are run in the United States. The USAWKF is a member of the Pan-American Wushu Federation (PAWF) and the International Wushu Federation (IWUF).

== Background ==
Modern wushu taolu started to become popular in the United States after a Chinese delegation's 1974 visit to President Richard Nixon and Secretary of State Henry Kissinger at the White House. In 1981, a team was organized by Masters Bow-sim Mark, Anthony Chan, and Roger Tung to help American athletes train in China. More teams were created for the International Invitational Wushu Championships of 1985, 1986, and 1988. Around this time, organizations such as the North American Chinese Martial Arts Federation (NACMAF) and the United States Chinese Martial Arts Council (USCMAC) were successful in promoting purely Wushu-related events throughout the United States, but the general national community was still divided.

== History ==
After several meetings across the United States, the USAWKF was formed in 1993 with the intent of unifying the Chinese martial arts community and promoting Wushu in America. Some of the most renowned practitioners, promoters, and coaches of Wushu in the U.S. were founding members of the organization.

Starting in 1994, the USAWKF started hosting regional and national competitions for Wushu Taolu and Sanhou events, and also developed a national ranking system. In 1995, the USAWKF held the 3rd World Wushu Championships in Baltimore, Maryland, which marked the first time a major international Wushu competition was held outside of Asia. The event was also broadcast on ESPN2. That same year, the Pan American Wushu Federation (PAWF) was founded with the USAWKF having a primary role in the organization.

Management of the US Sanda Team was briefly given to the USA Sanshou Kungfu Federation (USASKF) under longtime USAWKF coach, Shi Deru (Shawn Liu) from 2003 to 2007.

As of 2020, athletes of the US Wushu Team have won two gold medals, eleven silver medals, and eighteen bronze medals at the World Wushu Championships and have also achieved many victories in other competitions including the Taolu World Cup, Sanshou World Cup, World Traditional Wushu Championships, World Junior Wushu Championships, and the World Taijiquan Championships. Athletes of the USAWKF have also represented the US in the 2008 Beijing Wushu Tournament, the 2014 Nanjing Youth Wushu Tournament, the World Combat Games, the World Games, and the FISU World University Championships. Members of the USAWKF performed at the 2002 Winter Olympics where the International Olympic Committee recognized the International Wushu Federation.

After the start of the COVID-19 pandemic, the USAWKF hosted the wushu event at the 2022 World Games in Birmingham, Alabama, the 2023 World Wushu Championships in Fort Worth, Texas, and the 2024 Pan American Wushu Championships in Santa Clara, California.

The current president of the USAWKF is Anthony Goh, who is also the president of the Pan-American Wushu Federation and an executive vice president of the IWUF. The organization's headquarters is located in Baltimore, Maryland. The USAWKF was sponsored by Tiger Claw from 1995 to 2011 but is now largely sponsored by KungFuDirect who produce the uniforms for members of the US Wushu Team.

== See also ==
- United States national wushu team
