= Pan American Wushu Championships =

Continental sports championship

- Genre: Continental event
- Frequency: Biennial
- Inaugurated: 1996
- Most recent: 2024
- Organiser: PAWF
- Website: Official website

The Pan American Wushu Championships is a continental wushu championship hosted by the Pan American Wushu Federation (PAWF), the official continental representative of Pan America to the International Wushu Federation (IWUF). Since 1996, the Pan American Wushu Championships have been held every two years. The PAWF also hosts the Pan American Kungfu & Taijiquan Championships.

== History ==
At the 1993 World Wushu Championships in Kuala Lumpur, Malaysia, a preparatory committee was created for the creation of the Pan American Wushu Federation. In 1994, Mexico hosted a "Pan American Wushu Championships" while the federation was still being formed. The following year at the 1995 World Wushu Championships, the PAWF was officially formed between members from Argentina, Barbados, Brazil, Canada, Colombia, Mexico, Peru, Puerto Rico, Trinidad and Tobago, Venezuela, and the United States. The president of the federation was selected to be Anthony Goh of the United States of America Wushu Kungfu Federation.

In 1996, the first official edition of the Pan American Wushu Championships took place from November 7 to 11 at Argentina's CeNARD which consisted of taolu and sanda events. In 2006, the Pan American Junior Wushu Championships were first organized beside the adult championships. In 2015, a completely separate competition, the Pan American Kung Fu and Taijiquan Championships, began to be organized by the PAWF.

== Championships ==
=== Pan American Wushu Championships ===
| Year | Edition | Location |
| 1994 | - | Mexico |
| 1996 | 1 | Buenos Aires, Argentina |
| 1998 | 2 | Toronto, Canada |
| 2000 | 3 | Manaus, Brazil |
| 2002 | 4 | Mérida, Venezuela |
| 2004 | 5 | Annandale, United States |
| 2006 | 6 | Toronto, Canada |
| 2008 | 7 | São Paulo, Brazil |
| 2010 | 8 | Buenos Aires, Argentina |
| 2012 | 9 | Monterrey, Mexico |
| 2014 | 10 | San José, Costa Rica |
| 2016 | 11 | Lubbock, United States |
| 2018 | 12 | Buenos Aires, Argentina |
| 2022 | 13 | Brasília, Brazil |
| 2024 | 14 | Santa Clara, United States |
| 2026 | 15 | Buenos Aires, Argentina |

Pan American Kung Fu and Taijiquan Championships

| Year | Edition | Location |
| 2015 | 1 | São Paulo, Brazil |
| 2017 | 2 | Puntarenas, Costa Rica |
| 2019 | 3 | San Jose, United States |
| 2023 | 4 | Markham, Canada |
| 2026 | 5 | Buenos Aires, Argentina |
