= 2024 Taolu World Cup =

3rd edition of the Taolu World Cup

- Venue: Yokohama Buntai
- Location: Yokohama, Kanagawa, Japan
- Start date: October 26, 2024
- End date: October 27, 2024
- Competitors: 211 from 27 nations
- Website: Official website

The 2024 Taolu World Cup (Japanese: 第３回武術太極拳ワールドカップ大会) was the third edition of the Taolu World Cup. It was held at the Yokohama Buntai in Yokohama, Japan, from October 26 to 27, 2024. Qualification was done through the 2023 World Wushu Championships and the 2024 Wushu International Invitational Tournament.

== Background ==
=== Selection process ===
At the International Wushu Federation (IWUF) congress at the 2019 World Wushu Championships, it was decided that the 3rd Taolu World Cup would be held in Tokyo, Japan from November 14 to 19, 2020. It would be organized by the Japan Wushu Taijiquan Federation. Previously, Japan had only hosted three prior major international wushu competitions with the most recent being the wushu event at the 2001 East Asian Games.

=== Impact of the COVID-19 pandemic ===
Shortly after the completion, the COVID-19 pandemic spread internationally. On April 20, 2020, the IWUF announced that the 3rd Taolu World Cup would be postponed to 2022 after a request from the local organizing committee. This announcement was later followed by cancellations of the World Junior Wushu Championships, the Sanda World Cup, the World Taijiquan Championships, the Asian Wushu Championships, the World Kungfu Championships, and eventually the 2021 World Wushu Championships were moved to 2023. With this update, the 3rd Taolu World Cup was rescheduled to 2024, and the qualifications from the 2019 world championships were to be replaced by rankings at the 2023 world championships.

=== Qualification ===
The top eight athletes at the 2023 World Wushu Championships qualified for the 2024 Taolu World Cup. In addition, an additional spot in each event was given to the gold medalists at the 2024 Wushu International Invitational Tournament held in April in China. The invitational tournament was organized because several countries had visa issues while trying to participate in the previous world championships.

== Schedule ==
All times are Japan Standard Time (UTC+9:00)

Date	Start time	Carpet
October 26	9:30	Women's Changquan
October 26	9:55	Men's Qiangshu
October 26	10:20	Women's Nandao
October 26	10:45	Men's Nangun
October 26	11:10	Women's Taijiquan
October 26	14:30	Men's Nandao
October 26	14:55	Women's Nangun
October 26	15:20	Men's Changquan
October 26	15:45	Women's Jianshu
October 26	16:10	Men's Taijijian
October 27	9:30	Women's Nanquan
October 27	9:55	Men's Gunshu
October 27	10:20	Women's Daoshu
October 27	10:45	Men's Jianshu
October 27	11:10	Women's Taijijian
October 27	14:30	Men's Nanquan
October 27	14:55	Women's Gunshu
October 27	15:20	Men's Daoshu
October 27	15:45	Women's Qiangshu
October 27	16:10	Men's Taijiquan
October 27	15:50	Women's Duilian
October 27	17:00	Men's Duilian

== Medal summary ==
=== Medal table ===
* Host nation (Japan)

Rank	NOC	Gold	Silver	Bronze	Total
1	China	8	0	0	8
2	Japan*	3	8	1	12
3	Indonesia	2	3	2	7
3	Malaysia	2	3	2	7
5	Hong Kong	2	2	3	7
6	Macau	2	0	4	6
7	Chinese Taipei	2	0	1	3
8	Brunei	1	1	1	3
9	Singapore	0	2	4	6
10	Vietnam	0	1	1	2
11	Philippines	0	1	0	1
11	South Korea	0	1	0	1
13	Nepal	0	0	1	1
13	Spain	0	0	1	1
13	United States	0	0	1	1
Totals (15 entries)		22	22	22	66

=== Men ===
Event	Gold	Silver	Bronze
Changquan	Song Chi Kuan; Macau	Motoyoshi Araki; Japan	Wong Weng Son; Malaysia
Daoshu	Liu Zhaohe; China	Jowen Lim; Singapore	Seraf Naro Siregar; Indonesia
Gunshu	Maho Imai; Japan	Lee Yong-hyun; South Korea	Seraf Naro Siregar; Indonesia
Jianshu	Wong Weng Son; Malaysia	Motoyoshi Araki; Japan	Bijay Sinjali; Nepal
Qiangshu	Zhang Qingchun; China	Muhammad Daffa Golden Boy; Indonesia	Chin Ka Hou; Macau
Nanquan	Lau Chi Lung; Hong Kong	Yabumoto Yoshiki; Japan	Huang Junhua; Macau
Nandao	Du Bowen; China	Calvin Lee; Malaysia	Mohammad Adi Salihin; Brunei
Nangun	Liu Chang-Min; Chinese Taipei	Mohammad Adi Salihin; Brunei	Akito Matsukawa; Japan
Taijiquan	Lu Xiangcheng; China	Tomohiro Araya; Japan	Sun Chia-Hung; Chinese Taipei
Taijijian	Sun Chia-Hung; Chinese Taipei	Tomohiro Araya; Japan	Chan Jun Kai; Singapore
Duilian	Brunei; Majdurano Joel Bin Majallah Sain; Abel Wee Yuen Lim	Philippines; Mark Lester Ragay; Mark Anthony Polo; Vincent Ventura	Spain; Nestor Urzainqui Milla; Aidan Pose Martinez; Vinctor de la Plaza Schineper

=== Women ===
Event	Gold	Silver	Bronze
Changquan	Nanoha Kida; Japan	Kana Ikeuchi; Japan	Sou Cho Man; Macau
Daoshu	Liu Xin; China	Eugenia Diva Widodo; Indonesia	Michelle Yeung; Hong Kong
Gunshu	Eugenia Diva Widodo; Indonesia	Kana Ikeuchi; Japan	Zoe Tan; Singapore
Jianshu	Yao Yang; China	Dương Thúy Vi; Vietnam	Lydia Sham; Hong Kong
Qiangshu	Lydia Sham; Hong Kong	Pang Pui Yee; Malaysia	Wong Weng Ian; Macau
Nanquan	Tasya Ayu Puspa Dewi; Indonesia	Tan Cheong Min; Malaysia	He Jianxin; Hong Kong
Nandao	Wu Jianing; China	Tasya Ayu Puspa Dewi; Indonesia	Lucy Lee; United States
Nangun	Tan Cheong Min; Malaysia	He Jianxin; Hong Kong	Đặng Trần Phương Nhi; Vietnam
Taijiquan	Shiho Saito; Japan	Zeanne Law; Singapore	Sydney Chin; Malaysia
Taijijian	Dai Dandan; China	Shiho Saito; Japan	Zeanne Law; Singapore
Duilian	Macau; Sou Cho Man; Wong Weng Ian	Hong Kong; Lydia Sham; Michelle Yeung; He Jianxin	Singapore; Zeanne Law; Zoe Tan; Kimberly Ong
