= 2026 Taolu World Cup =

4th edition of the Taolu World Cup

- Venue: Hiakou Wuyuan River Gymnasium
- Location: Haikou, Hainan, China
- Start date: July 4, 2026
- End date: July 9, 2026
- Competitors: 206 from 29 nations
- Website: Official website

The 2026 Taolu World Cup was the fourth edition of the Taolu World Cup. It was held in the Haikou Wuyuan River Gymnasium in Haikou, Hainan, China from July 4 to 9, 2026. Qualification was done through the 2025 World Wushu Championships. This is the second time that the Taolu World Cup has been held in China, and the first international wushu competition held in Hainan since its designation as a Free Trade Port.

== Medal summary ==
=== Medal table ===
* Host nation (China)

Rank	NOC	Gold	Silver	Bronze	Total
1	China*	8	0	0	8
2	Hong Kong	5	2	2	9
3	Malaysia	3	1	1	5
4	Indonesia	1	4	1	6
5	Macau	1	3	1	5
6	Singapore	1	2	2	5
7	Japan	1	1	4	6
8	Iran	1	1	1	3
8	Vietnam	1	1	1	3
10	Italy	0	2	0	2
11	Brunei	0	1	1	2
11	South Korea	0	1	1	2
11	United States	0	1	1	2
14	France	0	1	0	1
14	Uzbekistan	0	1	0	1
16	Chinese Taipei	0	0	2	2
16	Individual Neutral Athletes	0	0	2	2
18	Philippines	0	0	1	1
18	Portugal	0	0	1	1
Totals (19 entries)		22	22	22	66

=== Men ===
Event	Gold	Silver	Bronze
Changquan	Yang Yalin; China	Song Chi Kuan; Macau	Lee Yong-hyun; South Korea
Daoshu	Seraf Naro Siregar; Indonesia	Jowen Lim; Singapore	Kirill-zui Bondarenko; Individual Neutral Athletes
Gunshu	Gao Xiaobin; China	Loan Drouard; France	Jowen Lim; Singapore
Jianshu	Chen Jinsong; Hong Kong	Sy Nguyen Van; Vietnam	Ahmad Ghifari Fuaiz; Indonesia
Qiangshu	Kuong Chi Hin; Macau	Ahmad Ghifari Fuaiz; Indonesia	Shaun Chen; United States
Nanquan	Du Hongjie; China	Chan Chi Ngou; Macau	Huang Wen-sheng; Chinese Taipei
Nandao	Lau Chi Lung; Hong Kong	Shahin Banitalebi; Iran	Mostafa Hassanzadeh; Iran
Nangun	Lau Chi Lung; Hong Kong	Terrence Tjahyadi; Indonesia	Huang Wen-sheng; Chinese Taipei
Taijiquan	Samuei Hui; Hong Kong	An Hyeon-gi; South Korea	Tomohiro Araya; Japan
Taijijian	Gao Haonan; China	Samuei Hui; Hong Kong	Tomohiro Araya; Japan
Duilian	Iran; Abolfazl Gharehbaghi; Mostafa Hassanzadeh; Shahin Banitalebi	Indonesia; Ahmad Ghifari Fuaiz; Ahmad Ghozali Fuaiz; Seraf Naro Siregar	Philippines; Mark Lester Ragay; Mark Anthony Polo; Sandrex Gainsan

=== Women ===
Event	Gold	Silver	Bronze
Changquan	Michelle Yeung; Hong Kong	Lydia Sham; Hong Kong	Kana Ikeuchi; Japan
Daoshu	Lee Jia Rong; Malaysia	Eugenia Diva Widodo; Indonesia	Michelle Yeung; Hong Kong
Gunshu	Han Xueshi; China	Elena Chow; United States	Sou Cho Man; Macau
Jianshu	Wang Yawen; China	Nanoha Kida; Japan	Dương Thúy Vi; Vietnam
Qiangshu	Dương Thúy Vi; Vietnam	Pang Pui Yee; Malaysia	Aksiniia Schukiana; Individual Neutral Athletes
Nanquan	Kassandra Ong; Singapore	Lara Cossa; Italy	Silvia Cruz; Portugal
Nandao	Zhang Yaling; China	Wong Sam In; Macau	Tan Cheong Min; Malaysia
Nangun	Tan Cheong Min; Malaysia	Darya Latisheva; Uzbekistan	Kassandra Ong; Singapore
Taijiquan	Wu Xu; China	Zeanne Law; Singapore	Shiho Saito; Japan
Taijijian	Shiho Saito; Japan	Basma Lachkar; Brunei	Zeanne Law; Singapore
Duilian	Malaysia; Lee Jia Rong; Pang Pui Yee; Tan Cheong Min	Italy; Jasmine Zhu; Alessia Tartufoli	Hong Kong; Lydia Sham; Michelle Yeung
