= 2025 World Wushu Championships =

17th edition of the World Wushu Championships

- Venue: Ulysses Guimarães Convention Center
- Location: Brasília, Brazil
- Start date: August 31, 2025
- End date: September 7, 2025
- Website: Official website

The 2025 World Wushu Championships was the 17th edition of the World Wushu Championships. It was held in Brasília from August 31 September to 7, 2025.

== Development and preparation ==
During the IWUF Congress at the 2023 World Wushu Championships in Fort Worth, United States, delegations from Brazil, the Philippines, and Macau presented proposals to host the next few World Wushu Championships. Brasília, Brazil won the bid to host the 17th edition of the world championships by unanimous decision. This would mark the first time that the World Wushu Championships would be held in Latin America, and the first time a major international wushu competition took place in South America since wushu's appearance at the 2013 World Games in Cali, Colombia. Previously Brazil hosted the 2018 World Junior Wushu Championships and the 2022 Pan American Wushu Championships.

== Medal table ==
* Host nation (Brazil)

Rank	Nation	Gold	Silver	Bronze	Total
1	China	15	1	0	16
2	Iran	6	2	2	10
3	Malaysia	5	1	2	8
4	Individual Neutral Athletes	4	0	4	8
5	Hong Kong	3	7	5	15
6	South Korea	2	2	3	7
6	Vietnam	2	2	3	7
8	Macau	1	3	3	7
9	Indonesia	1	2	3	6
10	Japan	1	1	4	6
11	Egypt	1	1	1	3
12	Chinese Taipei	0	3	1	4
12	India	0	3	1	4
12	Singapore	0	3	1	4
15	Turkmenistan	0	2	2	4
16	France	0	2	0	2
16	Kazakhstan	0	2	0	2
18	Philippines	0	1	6	7
19	Brazil*	0	1	2	3
20	Turkey	0	1	1	2
21	Italy	0	1	0	1
22	United States	0	0	3	3
23	Mexico	0	0	2	2
24	Algeria	0	0	1	1
24	Armenia	0	0	1	1
24	Brunei	0	0	1	1
24	Kyrgyzstan	0	0	1	1
24	Romania	0	0	1	1
24	Switzerland	0	0	1	1
24	Tunisia	0	0	1	1
24	Yemen	0	0	1	1
Totals (31 entries)		41	41	57	139

== Medalists ==
=== Men's taolu ===
Event	Gold	Silver	Bronze
Changquan	Yang Yalin; China	Lee Yong-hyun; South Korea	Edgar Xavier Marvelo; Indonesia
Daoshu	Seraf Naro Siregar; Indonesia	Jowen Lim; Singapore	Kirill-zui Bondarenko; Individual Neutral Athletes
Gunshu	Gao Xiaobin; China	Loan Drouard; France	Lee Ha-sung; South Korea
Jianshu	Si Shin Peng; Malaysia	Chin Ka Hou; Macau	Chen Jinsong; Hong Kong
Qiangshu	Si Shin Peng; Malaysia	Kuong Chi Hin; Macau	Motoyoshi Araki; Japan
Nanquan	Du Hongjie; China	Lau Chi Lung; Hong Kong	Deng Longteng; Hong Kong
Nandao	Lau Chi Lung; Hong Kong	Deng Longteng; Hong Kong	Shahin Banitalebi; Iran
Nangun	Lau Chi Lung; Hong Kong	Huang Wen-sheng; Chinese Taipei	Mohammad Adi Salihin; Brunei
Taijiquan	An Hyeon-gi; South Korea	Samuei Hui; Hong Kong	Tay Yu Xuan; Singapore
Taijijian	Gao Haonan; China	Samuei Hui; Hong Kong	Tomohiro Araya; Japan
Duilian	Macau; Chin Ka Hou; Kuong Chi Hin; Lei Cheok Ieong	Indonesia; Edgar Xavier Marvelo; Ahmad Ghifari Fuaiz; Seraf Naro Siregar	Malaysia; Clement Ting; Si Shin Peng; Bryan Ti

=== Women's taolu ===
Event	Gold	Silver	Bronze
Changquan	Lydia Sham; Hong Kong	Michelle Yeung; Hong Kong	Sandra Konstantinova; Individual Neutral Athletes
Daoshu	Lee Jia Rong; Malaysia	Michelle Yeung; Hong Kong	Kana Ikeuchi; Japan
Gunshu	Han Xueshi; China	Sou Cho Man; Macau	Lee Jia Rong; Malaysia
Jianshu	Wang Yawen; China	Nanoha Kida; Japan	Wong Weng Ian; Macau
Qiangshu	Zahra Kiani; Iran	Patricia Geraldine; Indonesia	Dương Thúy Vi; Vietnam
Nanquan	Byun Si-woo; South Korea	Chao Tang-hsuan; Chinese Taipei	Leianna Yuen; United States
Nandao	Zhang Yaling; China	Tan Cheong Min; Malaysia	Chao Tang-hsuan; Chinese Taipei
Nangun	Tan Cheong Min; Malaysia	Chao Tang-hsuan; Chinese Taipei	Byun Si-woo; South Korea
Taijiquan	Shiho Saito; Japan	Zeanne Law; Singapore	Agatha Wong; Philippines
Taijijian	Wu Xu; China	Zeanne Law; Singapore	Shiho Saito; Japan
Duilian	Malaysia; Lee Jia Rong; Pang Pui Yee; Tan Cheong Min	Italy; Jasmine Zhu; Alessia Tartufoli	Hong Kong; Lydia Sham; Michelle Yeung

=== Men's sanda ===
Event	Gold	Silver	Bronze
48 kg	Li Jianhui; China	Ali Daoud; Egypt	Tharwi Al-Sendi; Yemen
48 kg	Li Jianhui; China	Ali Daoud; Egypt	None Awarded
52 kg	Ou Jiaming; China	Đinh Văn Tâm; Vietnam	Russel Diaz; Philippines
52 kg	Ou Jiaming; China	Đinh Văn Tâm; Vietnam	Fereddy Sinaga; Indonesia
56 kg	Arsen Umalatov; Individual Neutral Athletes	Carlos Baylon Jr. Philippines	Hứa Văn Đoàn; Vietnam
56 kg	Arsen Umalatov; Individual Neutral Athletes	Carlos Baylon Jr. Philippines	Sagar Dahiya; India
60 kg	Wang Zhunlong; China	Park Geon-su; South Korea	Gideon Fred Padua; Philippines
60 kg	Wang Zhunlong; China	Park Geon-su; South Korea	Arsen Baghryan; Armenia
65 kg	Wang Chengjin; China	Shoja Panahi; Iran	Xander Alipio; Philippines
65 kg	Wang Chengjin; China	Shoja Panahi; Iran	Spencer Meng; United States
70 kg	Erfan Moharrami; Iran	Alizhan Ablagatov; Kazakhstan	Eziz Muhammedov; Turkmenistan
70 kg	Erfan Moharrami; Iran	Alizhan Ablagatov; Kazakhstan	Trương Văn Chưởng; Vietnam
75 kg	Jin Gensheng; China	Mohsen Mohammadseifi; Iran	Song Gi-cheol; South Korea
75 kg	Jin Gensheng; China	Mohsen Mohammadseifi; Iran	João Oliveira; Brazil
80 kg	Andrei Miadzun; Individual Neutral Athletes	Li Weijin; Hong Kong	Marouane Adimi; Algeria
80 kg	Andrei Miadzun; Individual Neutral Athletes	Li Weijin; Hong Kong	Soheil Mousavi; Iran
85 kg	Dzhapar Magomedov; Individual Neutral Athletes	Muhammet Jumamyradov; Turkmenistan	Sergiu Daniel Breb; Romania
85 kg	Dzhapar Magomedov; Individual Neutral Athletes	Muhammet Jumamyradov; Turkmenistan	Murat Erdem; Turkey
90 kg	Mahdi Moradi; Iran	Serdar Jorakulyyev; Turkmenistan	Eduardo Pérez; Mexico
90 kg	Mahdi Moradi; Iran	Serdar Jorakulyyev; Turkmenistan	None Awarded
100 kg	Shamil Abdulmuslimov; Individual Neutral Athletes	Nikson Michel; France	Markus Glutz; Switzerland
100 kg	Shamil Abdulmuslimov; Individual Neutral Athletes	Nikson Michel; France	None Awarded
100+ kg	Ahmed Shalaby; Egypt	Nursultan Tursunkulov; Kazakhstan	Charymyrat Annagurbanov; Turkmenistan
100+ kg	Ahmed Shalaby; Egypt	Nursultan Tursunkulov; Kazakhstan	Karimzhon Baltabaev; Kyrgyzstan

=== Women's sanda ===
Event	Gold	Silver	Bronze
48 kg	Du Yuxia; China	Nguyễn Thị Lan; Vietnam	Chen Yuling; Hong Kong
48 kg	Du Yuxia; China	Nguyễn Thị Lan; Vietnam	Liang Xuezhen; Macau
52 kg	Ngô Thị Phương Nga; Vietnam	Aparna Dahiya; India	Jenifer Kilapio; Philippines
52 kg	Ngô Thị Phương Nga; Vietnam	Aparna Dahiya; India	Tharisa Florentina; Indonesia
56 kg	Nguyễn Thị Thu Thủy; Vietnam	Beatriz Silva; Brazil	Chan Tsz Ching; Hong Kong
56 kg	Nguyễn Thị Thu Thủy; Vietnam	Beatriz Silva; Brazil	Krisna Malecdan; Philippines
60 kg	Wu Xiaowei; China	Kareena Kaushik; India	Nathalia Silva; Brazil
60 kg	Wu Xiaowei; China	Kareena Kaushik; India	Chu Man Sin; Macau
65 kg	Sedigheh Daryaei; Iran	Sudenaz Gülay; Turkey	Claudia Monarrez; Mexico
65 kg	Sedigheh Daryaei; Iran	Sudenaz Gülay; Turkey	Maria Egorova; Individual Neutral Athletes
70 kg	Soheila Mansourian; Iran	Chen Ruiping; China	Mennataliah Aly; Egypt
70 kg	Soheila Mansourian; Iran	Chen Ruiping; China	Nasui Chaima; Tunisia
75 kg	Shahrbanoo Mansourian; Iran	Shivani Prajapati; India	Ekaterina Valchuk; Individual Neutral Athletes
75 kg	Shahrbanoo Mansourian; Iran	Shivani Prajapati; India	Sydney Carr; United States
