= 2024 Asian Wushu Championships =

10th edition of the Asian Wushu Championships

- Venue: Tap Seac Multi-sports Pavilion (capacity: 4,000)
- Location: Macau, China
- Start date: 12 September, 2024
- End date: 15 September, 2024

The 2024 Asian Wushu Championships were the 10th edition of the Asian Wushu Championships. It was held at the Tap Seac Multi-sports Pavilion in Macau from September 12 to 15, 2024.

The 10th edition of the championships were originally scheduled to be held in 2020 in New Delhi, India, but the competition was cancelled as a result of the COVID-19 pandemic.

== Medal table ==
* Host nation (Macau)

Rank	Nation	Gold	Silver	Bronze	Total
1	China (CHN)	18	1	3	22
2	Iran (IRI)	7	3	5	15
3	Malaysia (MAS)	3	4	3	10
4	Vietnam (VIE)	3	2	9	14
5	Hong Kong (HKG)	2	6	4	12
6	Macau (MAC)*	2	3	6	11
7	Kazakhstan (KAZ)	2	1	4	7
8	India (IND)	1	5	3	9
9	Japan (JPN)	1	5	2	8
10	Singapore (SGP)	1	2	3	6
11	South Korea (KOR)	1	1	3	5
12	Philippines (PHI)	0	5	1	6
13	Turkmenistan (TKM)	0	1	3	4
14	Uzbekistan (UZB)	0	1	2	3
15	Kyrgyzstan (KGZ)	0	1	0	1
16	Chinese Taipei (TPE)	0	0	1	1
16	Jordan (JOR)	0	0	1	1
16	Nepal (NEP)	0	0	1	1
Totals (18 entries)		41	41	54	136

== Medalists ==
=== Taolu ===
==== Men ====
Event	Gold	Silver	Bronze
Changquan	Ho Yin Ching; Hong Kong	Muhammad Danish Aizad; Malaysia	Chen Jinsong; Hong Kong
Daoshu	Gao Xiaobin; China	Vu Van Tuan; Vietnam	Ong Zi Meng; Singapore
Gunshu	Lee Yong-hyun; South Korea	Jowen Lim; Singapore	Clement Ting; Malaysia
Jianshu	Yang Yaling; China	Kuong Chi Hin; Macau	Si Shin Peng; Malaysia
Qiangshu	Xu Ao; China	Kuong Chi Hin; Macau	Nguyen Van Sy; Vietnam
Nanquan	Bryan Ti; Malaysia	Yun Dong-hae; South Korea	Nong Van Huu; Vietnam
Nandao	Du Hongjie; China	Bryan Ti; Malaysia	Huang Junhua; Macau
Nangun	Mao Maoyuan; China	Lau Chi Lung; Hong Kong	Huang Junhua; Macau
Taijiquan	Gao Haonan; China	Jones Llabres Inso; Philippines	An Hyeongi; South Korea
Taijijian	Tomohiro Araya; Japan	Ryo Murakami; Japan	An Hyeongi; South Korea
Duilian	Malaysia; Muhammad Danish Aizad; Si Shin Peng; Bryan Ti	Philippines; Mark Lester Ragay; Mark Anthony Polo; Vincent Ventura	Hong Kong; Ho Yin Ching; Chen Jinsong; Ting Kin-sing Kinson

==== Women ====
Event	Gold	Silver	Bronze
Changquan	Zahra Kiani; Iran	Sou Cho Man; Macau	Nanoha Kida; Japan
Daoshu	Sou Cho Man; Macau	Kana Ikeuchi; Japan	Kimberly Ong Li Ling; Singapore
Gunshu	Zheng Yibinyu; China	Kana Ikeuchi; Japan	Sou Cho Man; Macau
Jianshu	Zahra Kiani; Iran	Lydia Sham; Hong Kong	Dương Thúy Vi; Vietnam
Qiangshu	Wang Yawen; China	Nanoha Kida; Japan	Wong Weng Ian; Macau
Nanquan	Zhang Yaling; China	Tan Cheong Min; Malaysia	Cheung Ut Leng; Macau
Nandao	Tan Cheong Min; Malaysia	Darya Latisheva; Uzbekistan	Helia Asadian; Iran
Nangun	Wong Sam In; Macau	Tan Cheong Min; Malaysia	Darya Latisheva; Uzbekistan
Taijiquan	Zeanne Law; Singapore	Juanita Mok; Hong Kong	Vera Tan; Singapore
Taijijian	Wu Xu; China	Zeanne Law; Singapore	Shiho Saito; Japan
Duilian	China; Wang Yilin; Zuo Shiyu	Hong Kong; Lydia Sham; Michelle Yeung; Lau Po Yan	Iran; Zahra Kiani; Helia Asadian

==== Mixed ====
Event	Gold	Silver	Bronze
Taijiquan Doubles	Hong Kong; Samuei Hui; Yeung Chung Hei	Japan; Shiho Saito; Tomohiro Araya	Malaysia; Wong Zi Hong; Sydney Chin

=== Sanda ===
==== Men ====
Event	Gold	Silver	Bronze
48 kg	Kushal Kumar; India	Russel Diaz; Philippines	Islam Iminov; Kazakhstan
48 kg	Kushal Kumar; India	Russel Diaz; Philippines	Nguyen Phuong Nam; Vietnam
52 kg	Dinh Van Tam; Vietnam	Arnel Mandal; Philippines	Anuj; India
52 kg	Dinh Van Tam; Vietnam	Arnel Mandal; Philippines	Yang Xingwen; China
56 kg	Hua Van Doan; Vietnam	Karim Iminzhanov; Kazakhstan	Xu Jingtao; China
56 kg	Hua Van Doan; Vietnam	Karim Iminzhanov; Kazakhstan	Saydullo Abdubashitov; Uzbekistan
60 kg	Liang Panshi; China	Amir Hossein Hemmati; Iran	Do Huy Hoang; Vietnam
60 kg	Liang Panshi; China	Amir Hossein Hemmati; Iran	Xander Alipio; Philippines
65 kg	Bexultan Koskenov; Kazakhstan	Clemente Tabugara Jr. Philippines	Reza Abdollahi; Iran
65 kg	Bexultan Koskenov; Kazakhstan	Clemente Tabugara Jr. Philippines	Guo Tun Hung; Macau
70 kg	Wu Kangle; China	Trong Van Chuong; Vietnam	Cheung Yat Lam; Hong Kong
70 kg	Wu Kangle; China	Trong Van Chuong; Vietnam	Mohammad Farhadi; Iran
75 kg	Lin Hongwei; China	Vikrant Baliyan; India	Rasul Turganzhanov; Kazakhstan
75 kg	Lin Hongwei; China	Vikrant Baliyan; India	Huynh Do Dat; Vietnam
80 kg	Ali Khorshidi; Iran	Li Weijin; Hong Kong	Liu Wenlong; China
80 kg	Ali Khorshidi; Iran	Li Weijin; Hong Kong	Jang Kyung-bin; South Korea
85 kg	Mohammad Reza Rigi; Iran	Dovran Atayev; Turkmenistan	Omar Alfarooq Yahya; Jordan
85 kg	Mohammad Reza Rigi; Iran	Dovran Atayev; Turkmenistan	None Awarded
90 kg	Yernur Dakibay; Kazakhstan	Rajat Charak; India	Shivaji Silwai; Nepal
90 kg	Yernur Dakibay; Kazakhstan	Rajat Charak; India	None Awarded
90 kg+	Mohammad Nassiri; Iran	Karimzhon Baltabaev; Kyrgyzstan	Babajan Ivadullavev; Lebanon
90 kg+	Mohammad Nassiri; Iran	Karimzhon Baltabaev; Kyrgyzstan	Cai Jiahao; Hong Kong

==== Women ====
Event	Gold	Silver	Bronze
48 kg	Du Yuxia; China	Aparna; India	Mahriban Agayeva; Turkmenistan
48 kg	Du Yuxia; China	Aparna; India	Tran Thi Ha; Vietnam
52 kg	Chen Mengyue; China	Namrata Batra; India	Ngo Thi Phuong Nga; Vietnam
52 kg	Chen Mengyue; China	Namrata Batra; India	Sogand Sinkaei; Iran
56 kg	Nguyen Thi Ngoc Hien; Vietnam	Chan Tsz Ching; Hong Kong	Jahanvi Mehra; India
56 kg	Nguyen Thi Ngoc Hien; Vietnam	Chan Tsz Ching; Hong Kong	none awarded
60 kg	Zhang Xiaoyu; China	Sedigheh Daryaei; Iran	Yultuz Yuldashova; Kazakhstan
60 kg	Zhang Xiaoyu; China	Sedigheh Daryaei; Iran	Lin Tsai-mei; Chinese Taipei
65 kg	Dai Xinru; China	Soheila Mansourian; Iran	Nitika Bansal; India
65 kg	Dai Xinru; China	Soheila Mansourian; Iran	Nguyen Thi Ngoc Ahn; Vietnam
70 kg	Yasaman Bagherzadeh; Iran	Zhu Hailan; China	Govher Govshudova; Turkmenistan
70 kg	Yasaman Bagherzadeh; Iran	Zhu Hailan; China	Karina Ismailova; Kazakhstan
75 kg	Shahrbanoo Mansourian; Iran	Pooja Kadian; India	none awarded
75 kg	Shahrbanoo Mansourian; Iran	Pooja Kadian; India	none awarded
