= 2017 World Wushu Championships =

14th edition of the World Wushu Championships

- Venue: Kazan Gymnastics Center
- Location: Kazan, Russia
- Dates: 29 September – 3 October 2017

The 2017 World Wushu Championships was the 14th edition of the World Wushu Championships. It was held at the Kazan Gymnastics Center in Kazan, Russia from September 29 to October 3, 2017.

== Medal table ==
Rank	Nation	Gold	Silver	Bronze	Total
1	China	15	0	0	15
2	Iran	8	1	2	11
3	Hong Kong	5	3	3	11
4	Russia	3	2	2	7
5	South Korea	2	9	2	13
6	Vietnam	2	5	2	9
7	Indonesia	2	4	2	8
8	Malaysia	2	3	3	8
9	Macau	1	3	3	7
10	Japan	1	2	5	8
11	Chinese Taipei	1	1	3	5
12	India	1	0	4	5
13	France	1	0	0	1
14	Egypt	0	3	3	6
15	Ukraine	0	2	3	5
16	Philippines	0	2	2	4
17	Belarus	0	1	2	3
18	Azerbaijan	0	1	1	2
18	United States	0	1	1	2
20	Sweden	0	1	0	1
21	Algeria	0	0	3	3
22	Armenia	0	0	1	1
22	Brazil	0	0	1	1
22	Georgia	0	0	1	1
22	Germany	0	0	1	1
22	Greece	0	0	1	1
22	Kazakhstan	0	0	1	1
22	Kyrgyzstan	0	0	1	1
22	Lebanon	0	0	1	1
22	Morocco	0	0	1	1
22	Netherlands	0	0	1	1
22	Romania	0	0	1	1
22	Singapore	0	0	1	1
22	South Africa	0	0	1	1
22	Spain	0	0	1	1
22	Sri Lanka	0	0	1	1
22	Turkey	0	0	1	1
Totals (37 entries)		44	44	62	150

== Medalists ==
=== Men's taolu ===
Event	Gold	Silver	Bronze
Changquan	Chang Zhizhao; China	Achmad Hulaefi; Indonesia	Pavel Muratov; Russia
Daoshu	Li Zhifeng; China	Edgar Xavier Marvelo; Indonesia	Jowen Lim; Singapore
Gunshu	Lee Yong-hyun; South Korea	Achmad Hulaefi; Indonesia	Wang Chen-ming; Chinese Taipei
Jianshu	Wong Weng Son; Malaysia	Lee Ha-sung; South Korea	Yeap Wai Kin; Malaysia
Qiangshu	Zhang Yaowen; China	Wong Weng Son; Malaysia	Yeap Wai Kin; Malaysia
Nanquan	Li Jianming; China	Huang Junhua; Macau	Phạm Quốc Khánh; Vietnam
Nandao	Huang Junhua; Macau	Cao Khắc Đạt; Vietnam	Lai Po-wei; Chinese Taipei
Nangun	Lai Po-wei; Chinese Taipei	Ho Mun Hua; Malaysia	Lee Yong-mun; South Korea
Taijiquan	Yang Shunhong; China	Samuei Hui; Hong Kong	Tomohiro Araya; Japan
Taijijian	Tomohiro Araya; Japan	Chuang Yu-yeh; Chinese Taipei	Samuei Hui; Hong Kong
Shuangdao	Vladimir Maksimov; Russia	Cho Seung-jae; South Korea	Chio Wai Keong; Macau
Xingyiquan	Léo Benouaich; France	Cheong Pui Seng; Macau	Christoph Huynh; Germany
Duilian	Iran; Farshad Arabi; Navid Makvandi; Amir Mohammadrezaei	South Korea; Lee Ha-sung; Lee Yong-mun; Lee Yong-hyun	Ukraine; Roman Reva; Artem Suong; Andriy Fehetsyn

=== Women's taolu ===
Event	Gold	Silver	Bronze
Changquan	Wang Xue; China	Liu Xuxu; Hong Kong	Li Yi; Macau
Daoshu	Liu Xuxu; Hong Kong	Ganna Tereshchenko; Ukraine	Risa Ikeuchi; Japan
Gunshu	Felda Elvira Santoso; Indonesia	Risa Ikeuchi; Japan	Liu Xuxu; Hong Kong
Jianshu	Seo Hee-ju; South Korea	Keiko Yamaguchi; Japan	Zahra Kiani; Iran
Qiangshu	Dương Thúy Vi; Vietnam	Seo Hee-ju; South Korea	Keiko Yamaguchi; Japan
Nanquan	Chen Huiying; China	Tatiana Ivshina; Russia	He Jianxin; Hong Kong
Nandao	He Jianxin; Hong Kong	Tan Cheong Min; Malaysia	Juwita Niza Wasni; Indonesia
Nangun	He Jianxin; Hong Kong	Juwita Niza Wasni; Indonesia	Tan Cheong Min; Malaysia
Taijiquan	Lindswell Kwok; Indonesia	Trần Thị Khánh Ly; Vietnam	Shiho Saito; Japan
Taijijian	Chen Suijin; Hong Kong	Trần Thị Khánh Ly; Vietnam	Shiho Saito; Japan
Baguazhang	Duan Jing; China	Chen Suijin; Hong Kong	Zeynep Makbule Akyüz; Turkey
Shuangjian	Zheng Tianhui; Hong Kong	Liudmyla Temna; Ukraine	Hanieh Rajabi; Iran
Duilian	Malaysia; Phoon Eyin; Loh Ying Ting; Tan Cheong Min	United States; Lucy Lee; Mia Tian	Macau; Li Yi; Sou Cho Man

=== Men's sanda ===
Event	Gold	Silver	Bronze
48 kg	Wang Yongjie; China	Orkhan Hatamov; Azerbaijan	M. Rameshchandra Singh; India
48 kg	Wang Yongjie; China	Orkhan Hatamov; Azerbaijan	Lakshman Gunasekera; Sri Lanka
52 kg	Vũ Minh Đức; Vietnam	Arnel Mandal; Philippines	Abdelkarim Benghenem; Algeria
52 kg	Vũ Minh Đức; Vietnam	Arnel Mandal; Philippines	Sargis Sargsyan; Armenia
56 kg	Li Kang; China	Yun Ung-jin; South Korea	Manuchar Kvashilava; Georgia
56 kg	Li Kang; China	Yun Ung-jin; South Korea	Francisco Solis; Philippines
60 kg	Ali Magomedov; Russia	Jo Sung-hyun; South Korea	Abdul Haris Sofyan; Indonesia
60 kg	Ali Magomedov; Russia	Jo Sung-hyun; South Korea	Surya Bhanu Pratap Singh; India
65 kg	Zhang Teng; China	Park Seung-mo; South Korea	Yauhen Sliaptsou; Belarus
65 kg	Zhang Teng; China	Park Seung-mo; South Korea	Ruslan Piraliyev; Azerbaijan
70 kg	Mohsen Mohammadseifi; Iran	Ayman Galal; Egypt	Saad Boujekka; Morocco
70 kg	Mohsen Mohammadseifi; Iran	Ayman Galal; Egypt	Abdelhadi Bouabid; Algeria
75 kg	Yousef Sabri; Iran	Cai Feilong; Macau	Ismail Aliev; Russia
75 kg	Yousef Sabri; Iran	Cai Feilong; Macau	Elie Bou Gebrael; Lebanon
80 kg	Arslan Bektimirov; Russia	Kim Myeong-jin; South Korea	André Fandiño; Spain
80 kg	Arslan Bektimirov; Russia	Kim Myeong-jin; South Korea	Talantbek Akmatov; Kyrgyzstan
85 kg	Moein Taghavi; Iran	Vadzim Rolich; Belarus	Emmanuel Minnaar; South Africa
85 kg	Moein Taghavi; Iran	Vadzim Rolich; Belarus	Ashraf Abdelgawad; Egypt
90 kg	Milad Arefi; Iran	Omar Mamdouh; Egypt	Rajinder Singh; India
90 kg	Milad Arefi; Iran	Omar Mamdouh; Egypt	Illia Varchenia; Belarus
+90 kg	Ye Xiang; China	Hamid Reza Gholipour; Iran	Motaz Rady; Egypt
+90 kg	Ye Xiang; China	Hamid Reza Gholipour; Iran	Daniel Ghiță; Romania

=== Women's sanda ===
Event	Gold	Silver	Bronze
48 kg	Dai Shimeng; China	Byeon Bo-kyeong; South Korea	Ayan Tursyn; Kazakhstan
48 kg	Dai Shimeng; China	Byeon Bo-kyeong; South Korea	Divine Wally; Philippines
52 kg	Elaheh Mansourian; Iran	Hoàng Thị Luân; Vietnam	Kim Hye-bin; South Korea
52 kg	Elaheh Mansourian; Iran	Hoàng Thị Luân; Vietnam	Edinéia Camargo; Brazil
56 kg	Liu Huimin; China	Elin Öberg; Sweden	Olena Riabokin; Ukraine
56 kg	Liu Huimin; China	Elin Öberg; Sweden	Nguyễn Thị Thu Thuỷ; Vietnam
60 kg	Cai Yingying; China	Nguyễn Thị Trang; Vietnam	Ilona Olkhovyk; Ukraine
60 kg	Cai Yingying; China	Nguyễn Thị Trang; Vietnam	Lin Yi-ju; Chinese Taipei
65 kg	Shahrbanoo Mansourian; Iran	Sherouk Ahmed; Egypt	K. Arunpama Devi; India
65 kg	Shahrbanoo Mansourian; Iran	Sherouk Ahmed; Egypt	Louiza Attig Lazazi; Algeria
70 kg	Maryam Hashemi; Iran	Hergie Bacyadan; Philippines	Danielle Newsom; United States
70 kg	Maryam Hashemi; Iran	Hergie Bacyadan; Philippines	Maria Scherpenberg; Netherlands
75 kg	Pooja Kadian; India	Evgeniya Stepanova; Russia	Anastasia Leontari; Greece
75 kg	Pooja Kadian; India	Evgeniya Stepanova; Russia	Heba Abdelkader; Egypt
