= 2023 World Wushu Championships =

16th edition of the World Wushu Championships

- Venue: Fort Worth Convention Center (capacity: 13,500)
- Location: Fort Worth, Texas, United States
- Start date: November 16, 2023
- End date: November 20, 2023
- Competitors: 499 from 72 nations
- Website: Official website

The 2023 World Wushu Championships was the 16th edition of the World Wushu Championships. It was held at the Fort Worth Convention Center in Fort Worth, Texas, United States, from November 16 to 20, 2023.

== Development and preparation ==
=== Selection process ===
During the 2019 World Wushu Championships in Shanghai, China, the 15th IWUF Congress met to vote on the host city for the 16th WWC. At the conclusion of the competition, it was announced that the next edition of the world championships would be held in 2021 in Dallas, Texas, United States. This would mark the first time a major international wushu competition was held in the United States since the 1995 World Wushu Championships. The competition will be organized by the United States of America Wushu Kungfu Federation (USAWKF) under Anthony Goh.

The 16th WWC was also meant to serve as preparation for the wushu event at the 2022 World Games which was also hosted by the United States.

=== Impact of the COVID-19 pandemic ===
Shortly after the 15th WWC, the COVID-19 pandemic spread internationally. Numerous wushu competitions including the 2020 World Junior Wushu Championships and the 2020 Taolu World Cup were postponed or cancelled. The IWUF left no updates on the situation regarding the 16th world championships for months, but on July 15, 2021, the IWUF virtual congress announced that the 16th WWC would be postponed to 2023. Qualification for wushu at the 2022 World Games was then done by ranking at the 2019 WWC.

Over a year later on September 15, 2022, the USAWKF announced that the 16th WWC would officially take place in November 2023 at the Fort Worth Convention Center.

== The championships ==
=== Opening ceremony ===
In a press conference in August 2023, it was revealed that performers in the opening ceremony would include tai chi enthusiasts of various ethnic groups from the United States as well as the Yunnan provincial wushu team.

=== Changes to competition events ===
A number of competition event changes were revealed in the competition regulations of the 16th WWC. Men's and women's changquan now consisted of a preliminary and final round, and athletes also were allowed to use different routines for both rounds. Instead of traditional wushu events like in recent prior championships, there would be a "creative & nandu skills" non-medal demonstration event.

=== Marketing ===
The official name of the competition, the "16th World Wushu Championships," was renamed to the "HYX 16th World Wushu Championships" to reflect the IWUF's financial partnership with the Hengyuanxiang (HYX) Group which began in early 2018.

After a design contest, the logo and theme for the competition were unveiled on November 16, 2022, with the theme being "Solidarity, Peace, Friendship." The top part of the logo depicts a warrior in the form of a ribbon and the bottom depicts the Texas Longhorn. Months later on August 6, 2023, the official medal designs based on the official logo were revealed. The mascots of the competition were also revealed to be "Dillo" the armadillo and "Striker" the Longhorn.

== Competition schedule ==
=== Taolu ===
All times are Central Standard Time (UTC-6:00)

Date	Start time	Carpet 1	Carpet 2
November 17	9:00	Men’s nangun	Men’s taijiquan
November 17	14:00	Men’s daoshu	Women’s nandao Women’s taijijian
November 18	9:00	Men’s nandao	Women’s nangun Men’s taijijian
November 18	14:00	Men’s changquan	Women’s changquan Women’s taijiquan
November 19	9:00	Men’s nanquan	Women’s jianshu Women’s nanquan
November 19	14:00	Men’s gunshu	Women’s daoshu Men’s qiangshu
November 20	9:00	Men’s jianshu	Women’s gunshu Women’s qiangshu
November 20	14:00	Closed	Men’s duilian Women’s duilian Men’s creative event Women’s creative event

=== Sanda ===
All times are (UTC-6:00)

Date	Start time	Lei Tai 1
November 17	9:00	Men’s & women’s round of 32
November 17	14:00	Men’s round of 16
November 17	19:00	Men’s round of 16
November 18	9;00	Women’s round of 16
November 18	14:00	Men’s quarterfinals
November 18	19:00	Women’s quarterfinals
November 19	9:00	Men’s quarterfinals & women’s semifinals
November 19	14:00	Men’s semifinals
November 20	9:00	Men’s finals
November 20	14:00	Women’s finals

== Medal table ==
* Host nation (United States of America)

Rank	Nation	Gold	Silver	Bronze	Total
1	China (CHN)	15	0	0	15
2	Vietnam (VIE)	5	3	3	11
3	Macau (MAC)	5	2	4	11
4	Hong Kong (HKG)	3	2	3	8
5	Singapore (SGP)	2	4	2	8
6	Malaysia (MAS)	1	6	4	11
7	Philippines (PHI)	1	4	1	6
8	Indonesia (INA)	1	3	7	11
9	Chinese Taipei (TPE)	1	2	1	4
9	South Korea (KOR)	1	2	1	4
11	Italy (ITA)	1	1	2	4
11	Lebanon (LBN)	1	1	2	4
13	Tunisia (TUN)	1	1	0	2
14	Australia (AUS)	1	0	1	2
14	Romania (ROU)	1	0	1	2
16	Kazakhstan (KAZ)	0	1	3	4
16	United States (USA)*	0	1	3	4
18	India (IND)	0	1	2	3
19	Brunei (BRU)	0	1	1	2
20	Bermuda (BER)	0	1	0	1
20	Brazil (BRA)	0	1	0	1
20	Canada (CAN)	0	1	0	1
20	France (FRA)	0	1	0	1
20	Mexico (MEX)	0	1	0	1
20	Switzerland (SUI)	0	1	0	1
26	Argentina (ARG)	0	0	2	2
26	Egypt (EGY)	0	0	2	2
26	Japan (JPN)	0	0	2	2
26	Turkmenistan (TKM)	0	0	2	2
30	Azerbaijan (AZE)	0	0	1	1
30	Colombia (COL)	0	0	1	1
30	Kyrgyzstan (KGZ)	0	0	1	1
30	Spain (ESP)	0	0	1	1
Totals (33 entries)		40	41	53	134

=== Men's taolu ===
Event	Gold	Silver	Bronze
Changquan	Wong Weng Son; Malaysia	Seraf Naro Siregar; Indonesia	Clement Ting; Malaysia
Daoshu	Liu Zhaohe; China	Clement Ting; Malaysia; Jowen Lim; Singapore	Shared silver
Gunshu	Jowen Lim; Singapore	Seraf Naro Siregar; Indonesia	Clement Ting; Malaysia
Jianshu	Song Chi Kuan; Macau	Wong Weng Son; Malaysia	Muhammad Daffa Golden Boy; Indonesia
Qiangshu	Zhang Qingchun; China	Wong Weng Son; Malaysia	Muhammad Daffa Golden Boy; Indonesia
Nanquan	Lau Chi Lung; Hong Kong	Huang Junhua; Macau	Calvin Lee; Malaysia
Nandao	Harris Horatius; Indonesia	Huang Junhua; Macau	Lau Chi Lung; Hong Kong
Nangun	Chan Chi Ngou; Macau	Lee Yong-mun; South Korea	Harris Horatius; Indonesia
Taijiquan	Lu Xiangcheng; China	Sun Chia-Hung; Chinese Taipei	Tomohiro Araya; Japan
Taijijian	Chen Yu-wei; Chinese Taipei	Tay Yu Xuan; Singapore	Tomohiro Araya; Japan
Duilian	Philippines; Mark Lester Ragay; Mark Anthony Polo; Vincent Ventura	Brunei; Majdurano Joel Bin Majallah Sain; Abel Wee Yuen Lim	Spain; Nestor Urzainqui Milla; Aidan Pose Martinez; Victor de la Plaza Schineper

=== Women's taolu ===
Event	Gold	Silver	Bronze
Changquan	Sou Cho Man; Macau	Loh Ying Ting; Malaysia	Kimberly Ong; Singapore
Daoshu	Liu Xin; China	Loh Ying Ting; Malaysia	Hoàng Thị Phương Giang; Vietnam
Gunshu	Sou Cho Man; Macau	Kimberly Ong; Singapore	Michelle Yeung; Hong Kong
Jianshu	Yao Yang; China	Lydia Sham; Hong Kong	Li Yi; Macau
Qiangshu	Li Yi; Macau	Seo Hee-ju; South Korea	Peng Yu Hsi; Chinese Taipei
Nanquan	Đặng Trần Phương Nhi; Vietnam	He Jianxin; Hong Kong	Tasya Dewi; Indonesia
Nandao	Wu Jianing; China	Đặng Trần Phương Nhi; Vietnam	Lucy Lee; United States
Nangun	Đặng Trần Phương Nhi; Vietnam	He Jianxin; Hong Kong	Tan Cheong Min; Malaysia
Taijiquan	Zeanne Zhi Ning; Singapore	Agatha Wong; Philippines	Basma Lachkar; Brunei
Taijijian	Dai Dandan; China	Sydney Chin; Malaysia	Vera Tan; Singapore
Duilian	Hong Kong; Lydia Sham; Michelle Yeung; He Jianxin	Singapore; Zeanne Zhi Ning; Zoe Ziyi Tan; Kimberly Ong	Macau; Sou Cho Man; Wong Weng Ian

=== Men's sanda ===
Event	Gold	Silver	Bronze
48 kg	Yang Xingwen; China	Trần Huy Hải; Vietnam	Russel Diaz; Philippines
48 kg	Yang Xingwen; China	Trần Huy Hải; Vietnam	Kushal Kumar; India
52 kg	Tang Sishuo; China	Arnel Mandal; Philippines	Lacksmana Pandu Pratama; Indonesia
52 kg	Tang Sishuo; China	Arnel Mandal; Philippines	Đinh Văn Tâm; Vietnam
56 kg	Hong Minjun; South Korea	Bintang Reindra Nada Guitara; Indonesia	Ku Hio Lam; Macau
56 kg	Hong Minjun; South Korea	Bintang Reindra Nada Guitara; Indonesia	Islam Karimov; Kazakhstan
60 kg	Leung Yu Hong; Hong Kong	Nguyễn Mạnh Cường; Vietnam	Avazbek Amanbekov; Kyrgyzstan
60 kg	Leung Yu Hong; Hong Kong	Nguyễn Mạnh Cường; Vietnam	Elchin Eminov; Azerbaijan
65 kg	Guo Wei; China	Clemente Tabugara Jr. Philippines	Samuel Marbun; Indonesia
65 kg	Guo Wei; China	Clemente Tabugara Jr. Philippines	Bexultan Koskenov; Kazakhstan
70 kg	Huỳnh Đỗ Đạt; Vietnam	Zhang Huan Yi; Chinese Taipei	Yat Lam Cheung; Hong Kong
70 kg	Huỳnh Đỗ Đạt; Vietnam	Zhang Huan Yi; Chinese Taipei	Manuel di Carlo; Italy
75 kg	Michele Balducci; Italy	Yoan Benbedra; France	Cai Feilong; Macau
75 kg	Michele Balducci; Italy	Yoan Benbedra; France	Jo Sanghun; South Korea
80 kg	Liu Wenlong; China	Kevin Alan Galladro Onofre; Mexico	Fabio Gjorni; Italy
80 kg	Liu Wenlong; China	Kevin Alan Galladro Onofre; Mexico	Gochmyrat Jumanyyazov; Turkmenistan
85 kg	Michael Nicolas Woodward; Australia	Bruce Wang; United States	Georges Eid; Lebanon
85 kg	Michael Nicolas Woodward; Australia	Bruce Wang; United States	Juan David Armero Guiterrez; Colombia
90 kg	Georges Saade; Lebanon	Giuseppe Vincenzo Piccolo; Canada	Julian Martin Silva; Argentina
90 kg	Georges Saade; Lebanon	Giuseppe Vincenzo Piccolo; Canada	Livingston Mckenzie Jr. United States
90 kg+	Ye Xiang; China	Nursultan Tursynkulov; Kazakhstan	Michel Zammar; Lebanon
90 kg+	Ye Xiang; China	Nursultan Tursynkulov; Kazakhstan	Ahmed Samir Abdelmoaz; Egypt

=== Women's sanda ===
Event	Gold	Silver	Bronze
48 kg	Nguyen Thi Lan; Vietnam	Jenifer Kilapio; Philippines	Rosa Beatrice Malau; Indonesia
48 kg	Nguyen Thi Lan; Vietnam	Jenifer Kilapio; Philippines	Chhavi Chhavi; India
52 kg	Chen Mengyue; China	Elisa Calanducci; Italy	Ngo Thi Phuong Nga; Vietnam
52 kg	Chen Mengyue; China	Elisa Calanducci; Italy	Audrey Meeks; United States
56 kg	Liu Danfeng; China	Beatriz Adriao Rustice Silva; Brazil	Ana-Maria Pal; Romania
56 kg	Liu Danfeng; China	Beatriz Adriao Rustice Silva; Brazil	none awarded
60 kg	Nguyen Thi Thu Thuy; Vietnam	Roshibina Devi Naorem; India	Salome Yael Schumacher; Switzerland
60 kg	Nguyen Thi Thu Thuy; Vietnam	Roshibina Devi Naorem; India	Sabrina Marina Detoma; Argentina
65 kg	Andreea Cebuc; Romania	Krista Stepheny Dyer; Bermuda	Nicole Lowe-Tarbert; Australia
65 kg	Andreea Cebuc; Romania	Krista Stepheny Dyer; Bermuda	none awarded
70 kg	Zhu Hailan; China	Maya Bejaqui; Tunisia	Govher Govshudova; Turkmenistan
70 kg	Zhu Hailan; China	Maya Bejaqui; Tunisia	none awarded
75 kg	Rimel Khalifi; Tunisia	Lydia Shalameh; Lebanon	Roba Hossam Mostafa Abdelaziz Elshafei; Egypt
75 kg	Rimel Khalifi; Tunisia	Lydia Shalameh; Lebanon	Akniyet Marat; Kazakhstan

=== Creative & Nandu Skills Demonstration Event ===
Event	1st prize	2nd prize	3rd prize
Men	Nathan Ly; United States	Ezequiel Agustin Moyano; Argentina	Axel Erik Ludvig Westerkull; Sweden
Women	Event cancelled		

== Participating nations ==
On November 14, the Iranian delegation announced that they would not be able to attend the championships because the US embassy did not issue visas on time. A day later, the Indian delegation also announced they had difficulties securing a visa, and thus delayed their travel plans till November 16.

- Argentina (10)
- Armenia (3)
- Australia (2)
- Azerbaijan (3)
- Belgium (4)
- Bermuda (2)
- Belarus (1)
- Bolivia (4)
- Brazil (12)
- Bulgaria (2)
- Brunei (7)
- Canada (10)
- Republic of the Congo (15)
- Chile (6)
- China (16)
- Chinese Taipei (9)
- Colombia (1)
- Croatia (2)
- Czech Republic (2)
- Djibouti (3)
- Egypt (8)
- France (8)
- Great Britain (7)
- Georgia (2)
- Germany (3)
- Greece (3)
- Haiti (7)
- Hong Kong (12)
- Indonesia (15)
- India (16)
- Iran (12)
- Israel (8)
- Italy (12)
- Japan (8)
- Jordan (6)
- Kazakhstan (8)
- Kyrgyzstan (8)
- Latvia (6)
- Libya (5)
- Lebanon (8)
- Macau (12)
- Malaysia (8)
- Mexico (13)
- Morocco (2)
- Netherlands (5)
- Nepal (4)
- Norway (1)
- Pakistan (10)
- Philippines (14)
- Palestine (3)
- Poland (7)
- Portugal (8)
- Romania (6)
- Rwanda (2)
- Saudi Arabia (2)
- Senegal (6)
- Singapore (8)
- South Korea (13)
- Spain (9)
- Sri Lanka (1)
- Switzerland (7)
- Sweden (5)
- Tajikistan (6)
- Turkmenistan (10)
- Tunisia (3)
- Turkey (12)
- Uganda (8)
- Ukraine (7)
- United States (13)
- Uzbekistan (3)
- Vietnam (13)
- Yemen (2)
