= Tan Cheong Min =

Malaysian wushu practitioner

Personal information
- Born: 20 August 1998 (age 28) Cheng Township, Malacca, Malaysia
- Occupations: Martial artist, athlete

Sport
- Sport: Wushu
- Events: Nanquan, Nandao, Nangun
- Team: Malaysia Wushu Team
Medal record
Women's Wushu Taolu
Representing Malaysia
World Games
Gold medal – first place	2025 Chengdu	Nanquan+Nandao
World Combat Games
Gold medal – first place	2023 Riyadh	Nanquan + Nandao
World Cup
Gold medal – first place	2018 Yangon	Duilian
Gold medal – first place	2024 Yokohama	Nangun
Gold medal – first place	2026 Haikou	Nangun
Gold medal – first place	2026 Haikou	Duilian
Silver medal – second place	2018 Yangon	Nanquan
Silver medal – second place	2024 Yokohama	Nanquan
Bronze medal – third place	2018 Yangon	Nandao
Bronze medal – third place	2026 Haikou	Nandao
World Championships
Gold medal – first place	2017 Kazan	Duilian
Gold medal – first place	2019 Shanghai	Nandao
Gold medal – first place	2025 Brasília	Nangun
Gold medal – first place	2025 Brasília	Duilian
Silver medal – second place	2017 Kazan	Nandao
Silver medal – second place	2019 Shanghai	Nanquan
Silver medal – second place	2019 Shanghai	Duilian
Silver medal – second place	2025 Brasília	Nandao
Bronze medal – third place	2017 Kazan	Nangun
Bronze medal – third place	2023 Fort Worth	Nangun
Asian Games
Silver medal – second place	2022 Hangzhou	Nanquan + Nandao
Bronze medal – third place	2026 Aichi–Nagoya	Nanquan + Nandao
Asian Championships
Gold medal – first place	2024 Macau	Nandao
Silver medal – second place	2024 Macau	Nanquan
Silver medal – second place	2024 Macau	Nangun
Asian Cup
Silver medal – second place	2025 Songyuan	Nangun
SEA Games
Gold medal – first place	2025 Thailand	Nanquan + Nandao + Nangun
Gold medal – first place	2025 Thailand	Women's Duilian Weapon
Gold medal – first place	2023 Phnom Penh	Nanquan
Gold medal – first place	2023 Phnom Penh	Nandao + Nangun
Universiade
Silver medal – second place	2017 Taipei	Nanquan + Nandao
ASEAN University Games
Gold medal – first place	2018 Naypyidaw	Nandao + Nangun
Silver medal – second place	2018 Naypyidaw	Nanquan
Silver medal – second place	2018 Naypyidaw	Duilian
World Junior Championships
Gold medal – first place	2016 Burgas	Nanquan A
Silver medal – second place	2010 Singapore	Daoshu C
Silver medal – second place	2016 Burgas	Nangun A
Bronze medal – third place	2016 Burgas	Nandao A

Tan Cheong Min (Chinese: 陈昌敏; pinyin: Chén Chāngmǐn; born 20 August 1998) is a wushu taolu athlete from Malaysia.

== Career ==
Tan competed in the 2010 World Junior Wushu Championships where she won a silver medal in daoshu. Several years later at the 2016 championships, she became the world junior champion in nanquan and won a silver medal in nangun and a bronze medal in nandao.

Tan made her senior international debut at the 2017 World Wushu Championships where she won a gold medal in duilian and the bronze medal in nangun. She then competed at the 2017 Summer Universiade where she won the silver medal in women's nanquan + nandao combined. A year later, she competed in the 2018 Asian Games and finished fourth in women's nanquan. Shortly after, she won a gold medal in duilian, a silver medal in nanquan, and a bronze medal in nandao at the 2018 Taolu World Cup. She then competed at the 2019 World Wushu Championships where she became the world champion in nandao and won silver medals in nanquan and duilian.

At the 2023 SEA Games, Tan was a double gold medalist in nanquan and nandao + nangun combined. A few months later, she won the silver medal in women's nanquan at the 2022 Asian Games. Around a month later, she won the gold medal in women's nanquan + nandao combined at the 2023 World Combat Games. Shortly after, she won the bronze medal in nangun at the 2023 World Wushu Championships despite having a flu. Several months later, she competed in the 2024 Asian Wushu Championships and became the Asian champion in nandao in addition to winning silver medals in nanquan and nangun. Shortly after, she won the gold medal in nangun and the silver medal in nanquan at the 2024 Taolu World Cup. A year later, she won the silver medal in nangun at the 2025 Asian Taolu Cup.

== See also ==
- List of Asian Games medalists in wushu
