= Dương Thúy Vi =

Vietnamese wushu practitioner

- Duong Thuy Vi at Seagames29 (Malaysia, 2017)

Personal information
- Born: May 11, 1993 (age 33) Hanoi, Vietnam

Sport
- Sport: Wushu
- Events: Changquan, Jianshu Qiangshu
- Team: Vietnam Wushu Team
Medal record
Women's Wushu Taolu
Representing Vietnam
World Games
Gold medal – first place	2022 Birmingham	Jianshu+Qiangshu
Silver medal – second place	2013 Cali	Jianshu+Qiangshu
World Championships
Gold medal – first place	2013 Kuala Lumpur	Qiangshu
Gold medal – first place	2017 Kazan	Qiangshu
Silver medal – second place	2011 Ankara	Duilian
Silver medal – second place	2013 Kuala Lumpur	Jianshu
Silver medal – second place	2015 Jakarta	Jianshu
Silver medal – second place	2015 Jakarta	Qiangshu
Silver medal – second place	2019 Shanghai	Jianshu
Silver medal – second place	2019 Shanghai	Qiangshu
Bronze medal – third place	2011 Ankara	Jianshu
Bronze medal – third place	2013 Kuala Lumpur	Changquan
Bronze medal – third place	2015 Jakarta	Changquan
Bronze medal – third place	2025 Brasília	Qiangshu
World Cup
Gold medal – first place	2026 Haikou	Qiangshu
Silver medal – second place	2016 Fuzhou	Jianshu
Silver medal – second place	2024 Yokohama	Jianshu
Bronze medal – third place	2026 Haikou	Jianshu
Asian Games
Gold medal – first place	2014 Incheon	Jianshu+Qiangshu
Bronze medal – third place	2018 Jakarta	Jianshu+Qiangshu
Bronze medal – third place	2022 Hangzhou	Jianshu+Qiangshu
Bronze medal – third place	2026 Aichi–Nagoya	Jianshu+Qiangshu
Asian Championships
Silver medal – second place	2012 Hanoi	Jianshu
Bronze medal – third place	2012 Hanoi	Duilian
Bronze medal – third place	2016 Taoyuan	Qiangshu
Bronze medal – third place	2024 Macau	Jianshu
Southeast Asian Games
Gold medal – first place	2013 Naypyidaw	Jianshu
Gold medal – first place	2015 Singapore	Jianshu
Gold medal – first place	2017 Kuala Lumpur	Jianshu
Gold medal – first place	2017 Kuala Lumpur	Qiangshu
Gold medal – first place	2021 Hanoi	Jianshu
Gold medal – first place	2021 Hanoi	Qiangshu
Gold medal – first place	2023 Phnom Penh	Qiangshu
Silver medal – second place	2013 Naypyidaw	Qiangshu
Silver medal – second place	2015 Singapore	Qiangshu
Bronze medal – third place	2011 Palembang	Jianshu+Qiangshu
Bronze medal – third place	2015 Singapore	Changquan
Bronze medal – third place	2021 Hanoi	Changquan
World Junior Championships
Gold medal – first place	2010 Singapore	Duilian
Silver medal – second place	2006 Kuala Lumpur	Jianshu
Silver medal – second place	2010 Singapore	Changquan
Silver medal – second place	2010 Singapore	Qiangshu
Bronze medal – third place	2008 Bali	Changquan
Asian Junior Championships
Gold medal – first place	2009 Macau	Changquan
Gold medal – first place	2011 Shanghai	Jianshu
Gold medal – first place	2011 Shanghai	Qiangshu
Silver medal – second place	2005 Singapore	Jianshu (B)
Silver medal – second place	2007 Yeongju	Changquan (B)
Silver medal – second place	2007 Yeongju	Qiangshu (B)
Silver medal – second place	2009 Macau	Qiangshu
Bronze medal – third place	2005 Singapore	Qiangshu (B)
Bronze medal – third place	2009 Macau	Jianshu
Bronze medal – third place	2011 Shanghai	Changquan

Dương Thúy Vi (born May 11, 1993) is a wushu taolu athlete from Vietnam.

== Early life ==
Vi was born to a father who practiced shaolinquan and a mother who was a wing chun fighter, and started martial arts training under her parents at the age of three. When she was seven, her father took one of her cousins to practice wushu to lose weight and thus Vi discovered modern wushu taolu.

== Career ==
=== Junior, 2005-2011 ===
Thúy Vi made her international debut at the 2005 Asian Junior Wushu Championships where she won a silver medal in jianshu and a bronze medal in qiangshu. She also won a silver medal in jianshu at the 1st World Junior Wushu Championships in 2006. The following year, she won silver medals in changquan qiangshu at the 2007 Asian Junior Wushu Championships. Two years later, Thúy Vi was the Asian junior champion in changquan and a bronze medalist in jianshu after competing in the 2009 Asian Junior Wushu Championships. Her last junior competition was at the 2011 Asian Junior Wushu Championships where she was the Asian junior champion in jianshu and qiangshu and also won a bronze medal in changquan.

=== Senior ===
==== 2011-2014 ====
Thúy Vi first competed in the 2011 Southeast Asian Games where she won the bronze medal in women's jianshu and qiangshu combined. She then competed in the 2011 World Wushu Championships where she won a silver medal in duilian and a bronze medal in jianshu. In 2012, she competed in the Asian Wushu Championships in Hanoi and won a silver medal in jianshu and a bronze medal in duilian with Hoàng Thị Phương Giang.

The following year, the won a gold medal in jianshu and a silver medal in qiangshu at the 2013 Southeast Asian Games. Shortly after, Thúy Vi became the world champion in qiangshu and a silver medalist in jianshu at the 2013 World Wushu Championships. These repeated victories prepared her for the 2014 Asian Games where she was the gold medalist in women's jianshu and qiangshu, thus achieving Vietnam's first gold medal in wushu at the Asian Games and only gold at the 2014 games. This victory led Thúy Vi to be the first Vietnamese athlete to be featured in a CNN publication in the United States.

==== 2014-19 ====
At the 2015 Southeast Asian Games, Thúy Vi won medals of all colors with a gold victory in jianshu. Shortly after this, she was a double silver medalist in her weapons events and a bronze medalist in changquan at the 2015 World Wushu Championships. This qualified her for the 2016 Taolu World Cup where she won the silver medal in jianshu. She then competed in the 2016 Asian Wushu Championships and was a bronze medalist in qiangshu.

A year later, she was a double gold medalist in jianshu and qiangshu at the 2017 Southeast Asian Games, and was the world champion in qiangshu once again at the 2017 World Wushu Championships. Thúy Vi then competed in the 2018 Asian Games and won the bronze medal in women's jianshu and qiangshu. A year later, she competed at the 2019 World Wushu Championships where she won two silver medals in jianshu and qiangshu.

==== 2022-present ====
Thúy Vi's first major competition after the start of the COVID-19 pandemic was the 2021 Southeast Asian Games (hosted in 2022) where she won gold medals in jianshu and qiangshu and a bronze in changquan. Shortly after, she won the gold medal in women's jianshu and qiangshu combined at the 2022 World Games, the first medal for Vietnam at the 2022 games.

In May 2023, she won the gold medal in women's jianshu and qiangshu combined in the 2023 SEA Games. In September, she won the bronze medal in the women's jianshu and qiangshu competition at the 2022 Asian Games in Hangzhou. Shortly after, she competed in the 2023 World Combat Games and finished 5th in women's jianshu and qiangshu combined. She then competed in the 2023 World Wushu Championships and finished 6th in changquan and 13th in jianshu and qiangshu. Nearly a year later, she won the bronze medal in jianshu at the 2024 Asian Wushu Championships. She then won a silver medal in jianshu at the 2024 Taolu World Cup.

== Competitive history ==
Year	Event	CQ	JS	QS	AA	GRP
Junior
2005	Asian Junior Championships		2nd place, silver medalist(s)			
2006	World Junior Championships		2nd place, silver medalist(s)			
2007	Asian Junior Championships	2nd place, silver medalist(s)		2nd place, silver medalist(s)		
2008	World Junior Championships	3rd place, bronze medalist(s)	5	4		
2009	Asian Junior Championships	1st place, gold medalist(s)	3rd place, bronze medalist(s)	2nd place, silver medalist(s)		
2010	World Junior Championships	2nd place, silver medalist(s)		2nd place, silver medalist(s)		1st place, gold medalist(s)
2011	Asian Junior Championships	3rd place, bronze medalist(s)	1st place, gold medalist(s)	1st place, gold medalist(s)		
Senior
2011	World Championships	6	3rd place, bronze medalist(s)	6		2nd place, silver medalist(s)
2011	Southeast Asian Games		?	?	3rd place, bronze medalist(s)	
2012	Asian Championships		2nd place, silver medalist(s)			3rd place, bronze medalist(s)
2013	World Games		2	2	2nd place, silver medalist(s)	
2013	World Championships	3rd place, bronze medalist(s)	2nd place, silver medalist(s)	1st place, gold medalist(s)		
2013	Southeast Asian Games		1st place, gold medalist(s)	2nd place, silver medalist(s)		
2014	Asian Games		1	1	1st place, gold medalist(s)	
2015	Southeast Asian Games	3rd place, bronze medalist(s)	1st place, gold medalist(s)	2nd place, silver medalist(s)		
2015	World Championships	3rd place, bronze medalist(s)	2nd place, silver medalist(s)	2nd place, silver medalist(s)		
2016	World Cup	5	2nd place, silver medalist(s)	6		
2016	Asian Championships			3rd place, bronze medalist(s)		
2017	Southeast Asian Games		1st place, gold medalist(s)	1st place, gold medalist(s)		
2017	World Championships	6	9	1st place, gold medalist(s)		
2018	Asian Games		2	3	3rd place, bronze medalist(s)	
2019	World Championships	18	2nd place, silver medalist(s)	2nd place, silver medalist(s)		
2020	did not compete due to COVID-19 pandemic					
2021	did not compete due to COVID-19 pandemic					
2022	Southeast Asian Games	3rd place, bronze medalist(s)	1st place, gold medalist(s)	1st place, gold medalist(s)		
2022	World Games		1	1	1st place, gold medalist(s)	
2023	Southeast Asian Games		1	1	1st place, gold medalist(s)	
2023	Asian Games		6	2	3rd place, bronze medalist(s)	
2023	World Combat Games		6	4	5	
2023	World Championships	6	13	13		
2024	Asian Championships	17	3rd place, bronze medalist(s)	7		
2024	World Cup	5	2nd place, silver medalist(s)			

== See also ==
- List of Asian Games medalists in wushu
