= Lydia Sham (wushu) =

Hong Kong wushu practitioner (born 2000)

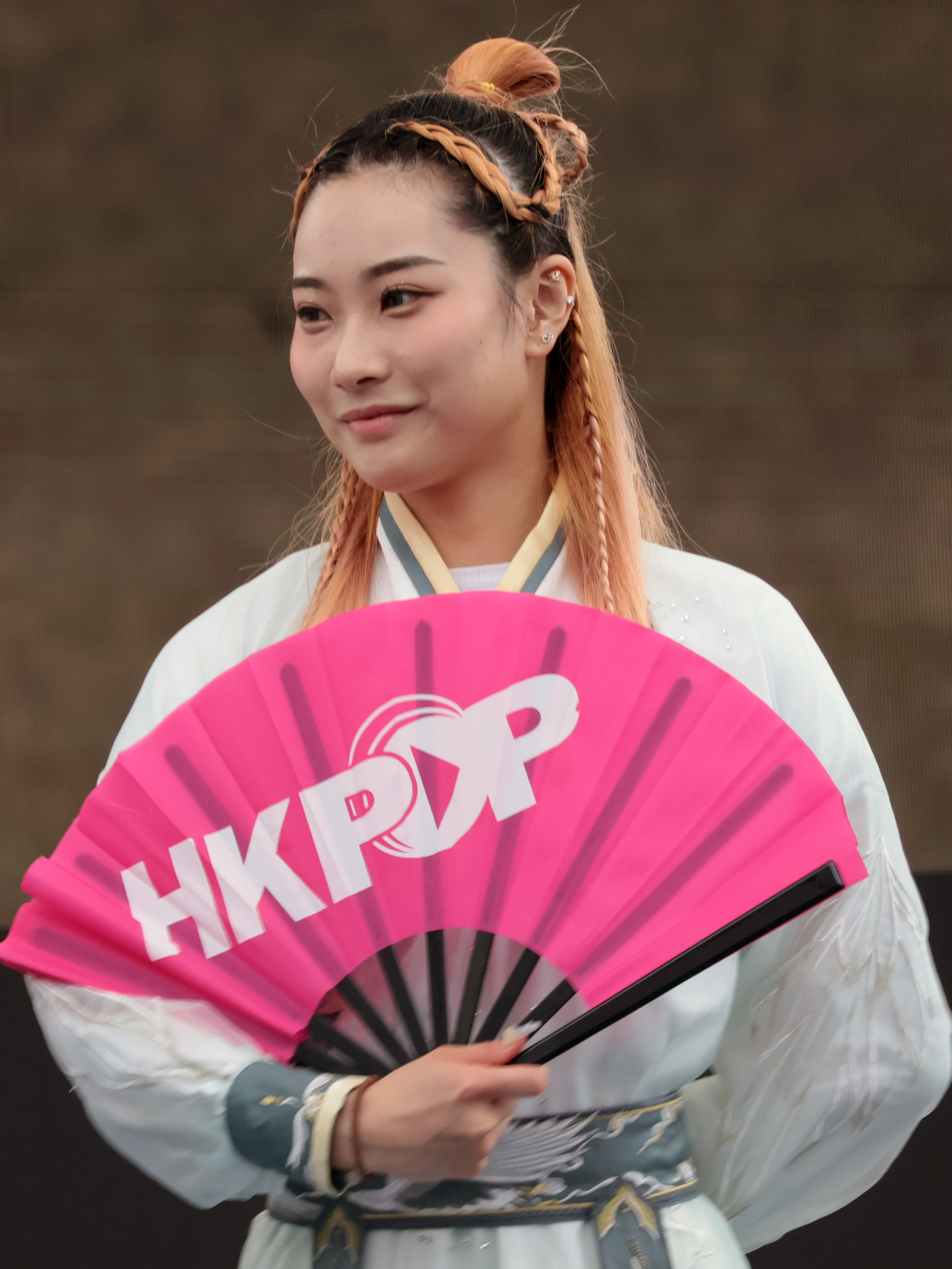
- Sham in 2024

Personal information
- Born: 3 August 2000 (age 26) Hong Kong
- Education: Hong Kong Polytechnic University
- Occupations: Martial artist, athlete
- Height: 1.62 m (5 ft 4 in)

Sport
- Sport: Wushu
- Events: Changquan, Jianshu, Qiangshu
- Team: Hong Kong Wushu Team
- Coached by: Geng Xiaoling
Medal record
Women's Wushu Taolu
Representing Hong Kong
World Games
Gold medal – first place	2025 Chengdu	CQ All-around
World Games Series
Gold medal – first place	2024 Hong Kong	CQ All-around
World Cup
Gold medal – first place	2024 Yokohama	Qiangshu
Silver medal – second place	2024 Yokohama	Jianshu
Silver medal – second place	2026 Haikou	Changquan
Bronze medal – third place	2024 Yokohama	Duilian
Bronze medal – third place	2026 Haikou	Duilian
World Championships
Gold medal – first place	2023 Fort Worth	Duilian
Gold medal – first place	2025 Brasília	Changquan
Silver medal – second place	2023 Fort Worth	Jianshu
Bronze medal – third place	2025 Brasília	Duilian
Asian Games
Gold medal – first place	2026 Aichi–Nagoya	Changquan
Asian Cup
Silver medal – second place	2025 Songyuan	Duilian
Asian Championships
Silver medal – second place	2024 Macau	Jianshu
Silver medal – second place	2024 Macau	Duilian
Bronze medal – third place	2016 Taoyuan	Duilian
World University Games
Bronze medal – third place	2021 Chengdu	Qiangshu
World University Cup
Gold medal – first place	2022 Samsun	Jianshu
Gold medal – first place	2022 Samsun	Qiangshu
World Junior Championships
Gold medal – first place	2014 Antalya	Daoshu B
Gold medal – first place	2018 Brasília	Changquan A
Gold medal – first place	2018 Brasília	Qiangshu A
Silver medal – second place	2012 Macau	Qiangshu C
Bronze medal – third place	2018 Brasília	Duilian A

Lydia Sham Hui Yu (Chinese: 沈曉榆; Jyutping: Sam^{2} Hiu^{2} Jyu^{4}; pinyin: shěnxiǎoyú; born 4 August 2000) is a wushu taolu athlete from Hong Kong.

== Career ==
Sham's international junior debut was at the 2012 World Junior Wushu Championships where she won a silver medal in qiangshu. At the 2014 championships, she won won a gold medal in daoshu. She later won a bronze medal in duilian at the 2016 Asian Wushu Championships with Yuen Ka Ying and He Jianxin. Two years later, she competed in the 2018 Asian Games and finished sixth in women's jianshu and qiangshu combined. The same year, she became the world junior champion in changquan and qiangshu and a bronze medalist in duilian at the 2018 World Junior Wushu Championships.

After the onset of the COVID-19 pandemic, her first competition was at the 2021 Summer World University Games (held in 2022) where she won a bronze medal in qiangshu. A year later, she competed in the 2022 Asian Games (held in 2023) and finished sixth again in women's jianshu and qiangshu combined. Shortly after, she won the gold medal in duilian with He Jianxin and Michelle Yeung and the silver medal in jianshu at the 2023 World Wushu Championships. Her high placements qualified her for the 2024 Taolu World Cup where she won medals of all colors in qiangshu, jianshu, and duilian. The same year, she also won two silver medals in jianshu and duilian at the 2024 Asian Wushu Championships and the gold medal in women's all-around at the 2024 World Games Series.

At the 2025 World Games, Sham won the gold medal in women's changquan, jianshu, and qiangshu all-around. The following year, she won the gold medal in women's changquan at the 2026 Asian Games.
