= Sou Cho Man =

Macau wushu practitioner (born 1997)

Personal information
- Born: 2 July 1997 (age 29)
- Height: 1.64 m (5 ft 5 in)
- Weight: 50 kg (110 lb)

Sport
- Sport: Wushu
- Events: Changquan, Gunshu, Jianshu
- Team: Macau Wushu Team
Medal record
Representing Macau
Women's Wushu Taolu
World Combat Games
| Silver medal – second place | 2023 Riyadh | Changquan |
World Championships
| Gold medal – first place | 2023 Fort Worth | Changquan |
| Gold medal – first place | 2023 Fort Worth | Gunshu |
| Silver medal – second place | 2019 Shanghai | Shuangjian |
| Silver medal – second place | 2025 Brasília | Gunshu |
| Bronze medal – third place | 2023 Fort Worth | Duilian |
| Bronze medal – third place | 2017 Kazan | Duilian |
World Cup
| Gold medal – first place | 2024 Yokohama | Duilian |
| Silver medal – second place | 2016 Fuzhou | Duilian |
| Silver medal – second place | 2016 Fuzhou | Gunshu |
| Bronze medal – third place | 2024 Yokohama | Changquan |
| Bronze medal – third place | 2026 Haikou | Gunshu |
Asian Games
| Silver medal – second place | 2026 Aichi–Nagoya | Changquan |
Asian Championships
| Gold medal – first place | 2024 Macau | Daoshu |
| Silver medal – second place | 2024 Macau | Changquan |
| Bronze medal – third place | 2024 Macau | Gunshu |
Asian Cup
| Silver medal – second place | 2025 Songyuan | Changquan |
East Asian Games
| Bronze medal – third place | 2013 Tianjin | Daoshu+Gunshu |
World Junior Championships
| Bronze medal – third place | 2012 Macau | Changquan B |

Sou Cho Man (Chinese: 蘇楚雯; pinyin: Sū Chǔwén; born 2 July 1997) is a professional wushu taolu athlete from Macau.

== Career ==
Sou competed in the 2012 World Junior Wushu Championships and won a bronze medal in changquan.

At the 2013 East Asian Games, Sou won the bronze medal in the daoshu+gunshu event. At the 2017 World Wushu Championships, she won a bronze medal in duilian. At the 2019 World Wushu Championships, she won a silver medal in shuangjian.

Sou won the silver medal in changquan at the 2023 World Combat Games. A few weeks later, she became the world champion in changquan and gunshu and won the bronze medal in duilian (alongside Wong Weng Ian) at the 2023 World Wushu Championships. Months later, she won medals of all colors and became the Asian champion in daoshu at the 2024 Asian Wushu Championships. She then won the gold medal in duilian and the bronze medal in changquan at the 2024 Taolu World Cup. A year later, Sou won a silver medal in changquan at the 2025 Taolu Asian Cup. At the 2025 World Wushu Championships, she won the silver medal in gunshu.

== Honours ==
Awarded by the Macau SAR Government

- Sports Merit Medal: 2015
