= 2019 World Wushu Championships – Women's Taijijian =

The women's taijijian competition at the 2019 World Wushu Championships in Shanghai, China was held on 20 October at the Minhang Gymnasium.

== Results ==
Rank	Athlete	Score
1st place, gold medalist(s)	Wen Xin JU (CHN)	9.710
2nd place, silver medalist(s)	Uen Ying Juanita MOK (HKG)	9.626
3rd place, bronze medalist(s)	Yujeong CHOI (KOR)	9.600
4	Suijin CHEN (HKG)	9.590
5	Shiho SAITO (JPN)	9.583
6	Khanh Ly TRAN THI (VIE)	9.566
7	Yan Ning Vera TAN (SIN)	9.540
8	Alexandra Calista SETIAWAN (INA)	9.523
9	Judy LIU (USA)	9.513
10	Yi Hui LIN (TPE)	9.400
11	Agatha Chrystenzen WONG (HKG)	9.353
12	Thi Minh Huyen TRAN (VIE)	9.350
13	Lin Ying HO (SIN)	9.200
14	Basma LACHKAR (BRU)	9.166
15	Myat Noe EAIN (MYA)	9.123
16	Sevara TOKHTAEVA (UZB)	9.090
17	Guat Lian ANG (BRU)	9.020
18	Sy Xuan Sydney CHIN (MAS)	8.963
19	Pui Kei HO (MAC)	8.946
20	Wei Jen LEE (CAN)	8.870
21	Sara HUSSEIN (EGY)	8.566
22	Mina GLAN (NEP)	8.373
Default	Bi Ying LIANG (CHN)	-
