= He Jianxin =

Hong Kong wushu practitioner

Personal information
- Born: 13 July 1991 (age 34) Zhongshan, Guangdong, China
- Education: The Education University of Hong Kong
- Height: 1.61 m (5 ft 3 in)
- Weight: 53 kg (117 lb)

Sport
- Sport: Wushu
- Event(s): Nanquan, Nandao, Nangun
- Team: Guangdong Wushu Team (2008–2016); Hong Kong Wushu Team (2016–present)
Medal record
Representing China
Women's Wushu Taolu
Asian Junior Championships
Gold medal – first place	2009 Macau	Nanquan (A)
Representing Hong Kong
World Championships
Gold medal – first place	2017 Kazan	Nandao
Gold medal – first place	2017 Kazan	Nangun
Gold medal – first place	2019 Shanghai	Nangun
Gold medal – first place	2019 Shanghai	Duilian
Gold medal – first place	2023 Fort Worth	Duilian
Silver medal – second place	2023 Fort Worth	Nanquan
Silver medal – second place	2023 Fort Worth	Nangun
Bronze medal – third place	2017 Kazan	Nanquan
Bronze medal – third place	2019 Shanghai	Nanquan
World Cup
Gold medal – first place	2018 Yangon	Nandao
Gold medal – first place	2018 Yangon	Nangun
Silver medal – second place	2024 Yokohama	Nangun
Silver medal – second place	2024 Yokohama	Duilian
Bronze medal – third place	2024 Yokohama	Nanquan

He Jianxin (Chinese: 何健欣; pinyin: Héjiànxīn; born 1992) is a professional wushu taolu athlete from Hong Kong.

== Career ==
=== Junior career ===
He began practicing wushu at the age of seven. After joining the Guangdong Provincial Wushu team in 2008, he competed in the 2009 Asian Junior Wushu Championships and won the gold medal in women's group A nanquan.

=== Senior career ===
After being transferred to Hong Kong, He made her international debut at the 2017 World Wushu Championships where she became the world champion in nandao and nangun and a bronze medalist in nanquan. This qualified her for the 2018 Taolu World Cup where she was a double gold medalist once again in nandao and nangun. At the 2019 World Wushu Championships, she was a double gold medalist in nangun and duilian with Yuen Ka Ying and Liu Xuxu, and a bronze medalist in nanquan.

At the 2022 Asian Games (hosted in September-October 2023), He finished 5th overall in the women's nanquan event. She won a gold medal in duilian and silver medals in nanquan and nangun at the 2023 World Wushu Championships. A year later, she won silver medals in nangun and duilian and a bronze medal in nanquan at the 2024 Taolu World Cup.

== Competitive history ==
Year	Event	NQ	ND	NG	AA	GRP
Junior
2009	Asian Junior Championships	1st place, gold medalist(s)				
Senior
2017	World Championships	3rd place, bronze medalist(s)	1st place, gold medalist(s)	1st place, gold medalist(s)		
2018	World Cup		1st place, gold medalist(s)	1st place, gold medalist(s)		
2019	World Championships	3rd place, bronze medalist(s)	5	1st place, gold medalist(s)		1st place, gold medalist(s)
2020	did not compete due to COVID-19 pandemic					
2023	Asian Games	6	4		5	
2023	World Championships	2nd place, silver medalist(s)	5	2nd place, silver medalist(s)		1st place, gold medalist(s)
2024	World Cup	3rd place, bronze medalist(s)		2nd place, silver medalist(s)		2nd place, silver medalist(s)

== Awards ==
Hong Kong Sports Stars Awards

- Outstanding athlete of Hong Kong (2017)
