= 2019 World Wushu Championships – Men's changquan =

The men's changquan competition at the 2019 World Wushu Championships in Shanghai, China was held on 21 October at the Minhang Gymnasium.

== Results ==
Rank	Athlete	Score
1st place, gold medalist(s)	Edgar Xavier MARVELO (INA)	9.663
2nd place, silver medalist(s)	Weng Son WONG (MAS)	9.656
3rd place, bronze medalist(s)	Hasung LEE (KOR)	9.643
4	Seraf Naro SIREGAR (INA)	9.623
5	Jesse Colin ADALIA (SIN)	9.606
6	Seyedmohammad HOSSEINI (IRI)	9.606
7	Riku MIFUNE (JPN)	9.603
8	Alex Zhaoyi NI (USA)	9.603
9	Nok In WU (MAC)	9.590
10	Roman REVA (UKR)	9.570
11	Jin MIFUNE (JPN)	9.530
12	Hibiki BETTO (JPN)	9.486
13	Brian WANG (USA)	9.483
14	Naoki TANG (USA)	9.466
15	Chen Ming WANG (TPE)	9.460
16	Bijay SINJALI (NEP)	9.420
17	Ilias KHUSNUTDINOV (RUS)	9.420
18	Andrew XI (USA)	9.413
19	Kirill BONDARENKO (RUS)	9.410
20	Si Wei Jowen LIM (SIN)	9.340
21	Min Khant ZAW (MYA)	9.303
22	Suraj Singh MAYANGLAMBAM (IND)	9.300
23	Yi Xiang YONG (SIN)	9.273
24	Jason CHEN-LEUNG (CAN)	9.260
25	Pavel MURATOV (RUS)	9.240
26	Everson Felipe PEREIRA DA SILVA (BRA)	9.223
27	Amr KASEM (EGY)	9.203
28	Francesco GUIDETTI (ITA)	9.203
29	Seungjae CHO (KOR)	9.203
30	Johnzenth Rapada GAJO (PHI)	9.200
31	Dante Salvador GAMBOA MEZA (MEX)	9.190
32	Domenico GIORDANO (ITA)	9.180
33	Chi Kuan SONG (MAC)	9.180
34	Rex LAM (CAN)	9.166
35	Tse Min TSAI (TPE)	9.150
36	Su Wei CLEMENT TING (MAS)	9.093
37	Steve COLEMAN (GBR)	9.060
38	Ruei Yu HUANG (TPE)	9.030
39	Dylan LIU (CAN)	8.993
40	Sam MAK (GBR)	8.963
41	John-nun TANG (NED)	8.836
42	Daniel NARVAEZ GOMEZ (MEX)	8.803
43	Brandon PORFIRIO DA SILVA (BRA)	8.800
44	David Gabriel BOBADILLA MOLINA (CHI)	8.760
45	Pascal Yves DUTOIT (SUI)	8.696
46	Marcio DE OLIVEIRA COUTINHO (BRA)	8.666
47	Melvin TAN (AUS)	8.666
48	Nestor URZAINQUI MILLA (ESP)	8.656
49	Dan Mihai RADULESCU (ROU)	8.653
50	Ivan AVINA MENDEZ (MEX)	8.650
51	Victor DE LA PLAZA SCHNIEPER (ESP)	8.633
52	Loan DROUARD (FRA)	8.533
53	Benjamin Alexander MUELLER (SUI)	8.393
54	Kameron Siyu LI (NZL)	8.316
55	Omari GULAB SHAH (AFG)	8.313
56	Dan RIO RODRIGUEZ (ESP)	8.326
57	Ariel Milton MANCILLA BARRIENTOS (CHI)	8.103
58	Morgan MYSKO (POL)	8.080
59	Hector Miguel TOLEDO TOLEDO (CHI)	8.046
60	Juan Heraldo SANDOVAL VEGA (CHI)	8.000
61	Moises Amado BOBADILLA MOLINA (CHI)	7.903
62	Firas SAYAHI (TUN)	7.853
63	Myo Min GYI (MYA)	7.850
64	Ricardo Andre VELASQUEZ BALTA (PER)	7.850
65	Jiaxi James LIU (NZL)	7.826
66	Reagan TAN (AUS)	7.756
67	Matias Santiago DIAZ (ARG)	7.743
68	Michal MALINOWSKI (POL)	7.660
69	Ivan Alejandro VAZQUEZ MENES (BOL)	7.586
70	Tim SASTROWIARDJO (NED)	7.580
71	Hasika Chameera Bandara DISANAYAKA MUDIYANSELAGE (SRI)	7.510
72	Vasileios MANDREKAS (GRE)	7.483
73	Vitor Emanuel FREITAS DE OLIVEIRA MAGANO (POR)	7.463
74	Oscar CONDORI QUISPE (BOL)	7.306
75	Hendrik BREHMER (BEL)	7.243
76	Christian Arturo CARRIZO (ARG)	7.080
77	Mark WALSCHOT (BEL)	6.800
78	KWIZERA Claudien (RWA)	5.75
Default	Jorge Alexander COPARA HUAYLLA (PER)	-
Default	Khadeem Dhouvalle MCINTOSH (JAM)	-
Default	Mohammad Safiee Shayferan BIN ROSLAN (BRU)	-
Default	Nzengue Boukanguo GLENN-RIENK (GAB)	-
Default	Kacper Jakub PALYS (POL)	-
Default	Martin HUANG HERMIDA (PER)	-
Default	Steve Armel MBOLLO SEYI (CMR)	-
Default	Zhao Hua WU (CHN)	-
Default	Emile Lambert LAMBE TONDOLEMBE (COD)	-
Default	Raymond BAUR (FRA)	-
