= Seraf Naro Siregar =

Indonesian wushu practitioner

Personal information
- Born: 17 September 2001 (age 25)
- Occupations: Martial artist, athlete
- Height: 1.62 m (5 ft 4 in)

Sport
- Sport: Wushu
- Events: Changquan, Daoshu, Gunshu
Medal record
Men's wushu taolu
Representing Indonesia
World Games
| Silver medal – second place | 2025 Chengdu | Daoshu+Gunshu |
World Combat Games
| Silver medal – second place | 2023 Riyadh | Daoshu+Gunshu |
World Championships
| Gold medal – first place | 2019 Shanghai | Duilian |
| Gold medal – first place | 2025 Brasília | Daoshu |
| Silver medal – second place | 2023 Fort Worth | Changquan |
| Silver medal – second place | 2023 Fort Worth | Gunshu |
| Silver medal – second place | 2025 Brasília | Duilian |
World Cup
| Gold medal – first place | 2026 Haikou | Daoshu |
| Bronze medal – third place | 2024 Yokohama | Daoshu |
| Bronze medal – third place | 2024 Yokohama | Gunshu |
Asian Games
| Bronze medal – third place | 2022 Hangzhou | Daoshu+Gunshu |
| Bronze medal – third place | 2026 Aichi–Nagoya | Changquan |
Asian Cup
| Gold medal – first place | 2025 Songyuan | Duilian |
SEA Games
| Gold medal – first place | 2019 Philippines | Duilian |
| Gold medal – first place | 2021 Vietnam | Daoshu+Gunshu |
| Silver medal – second place | 2025 Thailand | Duilian |
| Silver medal – second place | 2025 Thailand | All-Around (CQ) |
| Bronze medal – third place | 2021 Vietnam | Changquan |
| Bronze medal – third place | 2023 Cambodia | Daoshu+Gunshu |

Seraf Naro Siregar (born 17 September 2001) is a professional wushu taolu athlete from Indonesia.

== Career ==
=== Senior ===
Siregar's international debut was at the 2019 World Wushu Championships where he won a gold medal in duilian with Edgar Xavier Marvelo and Harris Horatius. They repeated this victory shortly thereafter at the 2019 SEA Games. After the COVID-19 pandemic, Siregar's first major competition was the 2021 SEA Games (hosted in 2022) where he won a gold medal in daoshu and gunshu combined along with a bronze medal in changquan. At the 2023 SEA Games, he won a bronze medal in men's daoshu and gunshu combined. Siregar then achieved the same result in the same event at the 2022 Asian Games a few months later. He then won the silver medal in the same event at the 2023 World Combat Games. Shortly after, Siregar won the silver medals in changquan and gunshu at the 2023 World Wushu Championships. A year later, he won bronze medals in daoshu and gunshu at the 2024 Taolu World Cup. A year later, he won the gold medal in duilian at the 2025 Asian Taolu Cup. He then competed in the 2025 World Wushu Championships where he became world champion in daoshu, and then won the gold medal in the same event at the 2026 Taolu World Cup..

== See also ==
- List of Asian Games medalists in wushu
