= Jowen Lim =

Singaporean wushu practitioner

Jowen Lim Si Wei
Personal information
- Born: 6 January 1999 (age 27)
- Education: Singapore Sports School

Sport
- Sport: Wushu
- Events: Changquan, Daoshu, Gunshu
- Team: Singapore Wushu Team
Medal record
Representing Singapore
Men's Wushu Taolu
World Games
Silver medal – second place	2022 Birmingham	Daoshu+Gunshu
Bronze medal – third place	2025 Chengdu	Daoshu+Gunshu
World Combat Games
Bronze medal – third place	2023 Riyadh	Daoshu+Gunshu
World Championships
Gold medal – first place	2023 Fort Worth	Gunshu
Silver medal – second place	2023 Fort Worth	Daoshu
Silver medal – second place	2025 Brasília	Daoshu
Bronze medal – third place	2017 Kazan	Daoshu
Bronze medal – third place	2019 Shanghai	Daoshu
Bronze medal – third place	2019 Shanghai	Gunshu
World Cup
Silver medal – second place	2024 Yokohama	Daoshu
Asian Games
Silver medal – second place	2022 Hangzhou	Daoshu + Gunshu
Asian Championships
Silver medal – second place	2016 Taoyuan	Daoshu
Silver medal – second place	2024 Macau	Gunshu
Bronze medal – third place	2016 Taoyuan	Duilian
Southeast Asian Games
Gold medal – first place	2017 Kuala Lumpur	Changquan
Gold medal – first place	2017 Kuala Lumpur	Daoshu+Gunshu
Gold medal – first place	2023 Phnom Penh	Daoshu+Gunshu
Silver medal – second place	2019 Manila	Daoshu+Gunshu
Silver medal – second place	2021 Hanoi	Daoshu+Gunshu
Silver medal – second place	2021 Hanoi	Changquan
Silver medal – second place	2023 Phnom Penh	Changquan
World Junior Championships
Gold medal – first place	2012 Macau	Gunshu (B)
Gold medal – first place	2014 Antalya	Changquan (B)
Silver medal – second place	2010 Singapore	Daoshu (C)
Silver medal – second place	2012 Macau	Changquan (B)
Silver medal – second place	2014 Antalya	Daoshu (B)
Silver medal – second place	2014 Antalya	Gunshu (B)
Asian Junior Championships
Gold medal – first place	2013 Manila	Changquan (B)
Silver medal – second place	2011 Shanghai	Daoshu (C)
Bronze medal – third place	2013 Manila	Daoshu (B)
Bronze medal – third place	2013 Manila	Gunshu (B)

Jowen Lim Si Wei (Chinese: 林思韦; pinyin: Lin Siwei; born: January 6, 1999) is a Singaporean wushu taolu athlete.

== Career ==
=== Junior ===
Lim started practicing wushu at the age of six. Between 2010 and 2014 he made three appearances at the World Junior Wushu Championships and became a two-time world junior champion. Lim also competed twice at the Asian Junior Wushu Championships and is a one-time Asian junior champion.

=== Senior ===
Lim competed in the 2016 Asian Wushu Championships in Taoyuan and was a silver medalist in daoshu and a bronze medalist in duilian. A year later, he competed in the 2017 Southeast Asian Games and was a double gold medalist. The same year, he competed in the 2017 World Wushu Championships and won the bronze medal in daoshu. A year later, he competed in the men's daoshu and gunshu combined event at the 2018 Asian Games and missed the bronze medal by 0.01. The following year, he was a double bronze medalist in daoshu and gunshu at the 2019 World Wushu Championships. Shortly thereafter, he won a silver medal in daoshu and gunshu combined at the 2019 SEA Games.

Lim's first major competition after the start of the COVID-19 pandemic was at the 2021 Southeast Asian Games (hosted in 2022), where he won silver medals in changquan as well as daoshu and gunshu combined. A few months later, he competed in the 2022 World Games and won the silver medal in daoshu and gunshu combined. The following year, he won a gold medal in daoshu and gunshu combined along with a silver medal in changquan at the 2023 Southeast Asian Games. Lim was then chosen alongside fencer Amita Berthier as the flagbearers for the 2022 Asian Games held in Hangzhou, China, and then won the silver medal in men's daoshu and gunshu at the event. Shortly after, he won the bronze medal in the same event at the 2023 World Combat Games. At the 2023 World Wushu Championships, Lim became the world champion in gunshu and won a silver medal in daoshu. The following year, he competed at the 2024 Asian Wushu Championships and won the silver medal in gunshu. He then won a silver medal in daoshu at the 2024 Taolu World Cup.

== Personal life ==
Lim has been married fellow wushu practitioner Vera Tan since 28 December 2024.

== Competitive history ==
Year	Event	CQ	DS	GS	AA	GRP
Junior
2010	World Junior Championships		2nd place, silver medalist(s)			
2011	Asian Junior Championships		2nd place, silver medalist(s)			
2012	World Junior Championships	2nd place, silver medalist(s)		1st place, gold medalist(s)		
2013	Asian Junior Championships	1st place, gold medalist(s)	3rd place, bronze medalist(s)	3rd place, bronze medalist(s)		
2014	World Junior Championships	1st place, gold medalist(s)	2nd place, silver medalist(s)	2nd place, silver medalist(s)		
Senior
2016	Asian Championships		2nd place, silver medalist(s)			3rd place, bronze medalist(s)
2017	Southeast Asian Games	1st place, gold medalist(s)	?	?	1st place, gold medalist(s)	
2017	World Championships	6	3rd place, bronze medalist(s)	17		DNS
2018	Asian Games		3	4	4	
2019	World Championships	20	3rd place, bronze medalist(s)	3rd place, bronze medalist(s)		
2019	Southeast Asian Games	4	?	?	2nd place, silver medalist(s)	
2020	Did not compete due to COVID-19 pandemic					
2021	Did not compete due to COVID-19 pandemic					
2022	Southeast Asian Games	2nd place, silver medalist(s)	3	2	2nd place, silver medalist(s)	
2022	World Games		2	2	2nd place, silver medalist(s)	
2023	Southeast Asian Games	2nd place, silver medalist(s)	1	1	1st place, gold medalist(s)	
2023	Asian Games		3	2	2nd place, silver medalist(s)	
2023	World Combat Games		2	3	3rd place, bronze medalist(s)	
2023	World Championships	23	2nd place, silver medalist(s)	1st place, gold medalist(s)		
2024	Asian Championships	14	12	2nd place, silver medalist(s)		
2024	World Cup		2nd place, silver medalist(s)	8		

== See also ==
- List of Asian Games medalists in wushu
