= Eugenia Diva Widodo =

Indonesian wushu practitioner

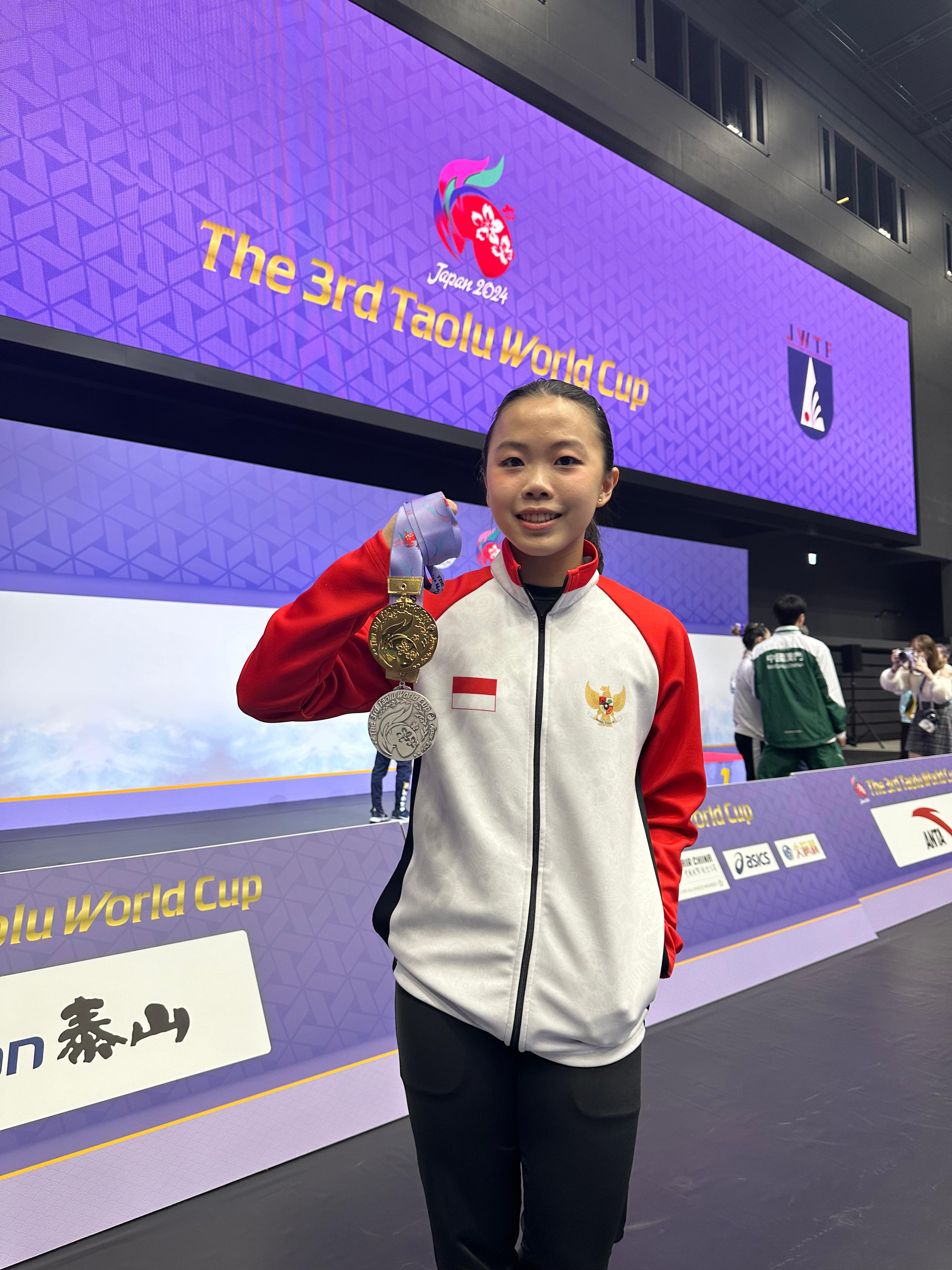

Personal information
- Born: 16 May 2003 (age 23) Jakarta, Indonesia
- Education: Bina Nusantara University
- Occupations: Martial artist, athlete
- Height: 1.53 m (5 ft 0 in)
- Weight: 48 kg (106 lb)

Sport
- Sport: Wushu
- Events: Changquan, Daoshu, Gunshu
- Club: Sasana Rahmat Wushu, DKI Jakarta
- Team: Indonesia Wushu Team
- Coached by: Susyana Tjhan (National); Novita (National); Zhang Yuening (International)
Medal record
Women's wushu taolu
Representing Indonesia
Taolu World Cup
Gold medal – first place	2024 Yokohama	Gunshu
Silver medal – second place	2024 Yokohama	Daoshu
Silver medal – second place	2026 Haikou	Daoshu
Asian Games
Bronze medal – third place	2026 Aichi–Nagoya	Changquan
Asian Cup
Gold medal – first place	2025 Songyuan	Gunshu
University World Cup
Silver medal – second place	2022 Samsun	Changquan
SEA Games
Silver medal – second place	2023 Cambodia	Changquan
Silver medal – second place	2025 Thailand	Duilian bare-handed
ASEAN University Games
Gold medal – first place	2022 Ubon Ratchathani	Changquan
Gold medal – first place	2024 Surabaya–Malang	Changquan
Silver medal – second place	2022 Ubon Ratchathani	Duilian
Silver medal – second place	2024 Surabaya–Malang	Duilian

Eugenia Diva Widodo (born May 16, 2003) is a female wushu taolu athlete from Indonesia. She is a world champion, as well as a silver medalist in SEA Games and gold medalist in PON.

== Early life ==
Eugenia was born on 16 May 2003 in Jakarta. She studied at the Bina Nusantara University in Jakarta.

== Career ==
=== 2017 ===
When she was still in 9th grade, she was already competing in the National Wushu Taolu Competition on 9–12 December 2017. During the competition, Eugenia obtained first place in the Women's Gunshu B number, first place in the Women's Daoshu B number as well as second place in the Women's Changquan B number.

=== 2021 ===
Eugenia competed in the 2020 Pekan Olahraga Nasional which was delayed to 2021 due to the COVID-19 pandemic in Indonesia, where she obtained a silver medal from the combined Daoshu+Gunshu number.

=== 2022 ===
==== SEA Games ====
At the 2021 SEA Games, Eugenia obtained a good score in the combined number of Daoshu+Gunshu with 9.700 points, but it was not enough for a bronze medal which was instead received by Hoàng Thị Phương Giang with 9.710 points. Due to this Eugenia shifted to spot number four.

==== University World Cup ====
In September 2022, Eugenia competed in the 2022 University World Cup held in Turkey and managed to obtain a silver medal in Women's Changquan number.

=== 2023 ===
In May 2023, Eugenia competed in 2023 SEA Games and got a silver medal with 9.650 points only losing to Myanmar's Sandi Oo with 9.680 points.

=== 2024 ===
==== ASEAN University Games ====
At the 2024 ASEAN University Games, Eugenia won a gold medal in the Changquan number with 9.453 points. She also won a silver medal in the Duilian number.

==== Pekan Olahraga Nasional ====
At the 2024 Pekan Olahraga Nasional, Eugenia was representing the Jakarta province and won the gold medal in the Women's Changquan number with a final score of 9.613. She also obtained a silver medal from the combined Daoshu + Gunshu number.

==== World Taolu Games ====
At the 3rd Taolu World Cup held in Yokohama, Japan at 23–27 October 2024, Eugenia obtained a gold medal in the Women's Gunshu number with a total score of 9.770 points. Eugenia also won a silver medal in the Women's Daoshu number.

== Competitive History ==
Year	Event	CQ	DS	GS	DL	AA
Junior
2017	Kejuaraan Wushu Taolu Pelajar dan Mahasiswa Tingkat Nasional	2nd place, silver medalist(s)	1st place, gold medalist(s)	1st place, gold medalist(s)		
Senior
2021	Pekan Olahraga Nasional		2nd place, silver medalist(s)			
2022	SEA Games		4	4		
2022	University World Cup	2nd place, silver medalist(s)				
2022	ASEAN University Games	1st place, gold medalist(s)			2nd place, silver medalist(s)	
2023	SEA Games	2nd place, silver medalist(s)				
2024	World Cup		2nd place, silver medalist(s)	1st place, gold medalist(s)		
2024	ASEAN University Games	1st place, gold medalist(s)			2nd place, silver medalist(s)	
2024	Pekan Olahraga Nasional	1st place, gold medalist(s)	2nd place, silver medalist(s)			
