= Jenifer Kilapio =

Filipino wushu practitioner (born 2000)

Personal information
- Nationality: Filipino
- Born: October 30, 2000 (age 25) Davao City, Philippines

Sport
- Country: Philippines
- Sport: Wushu
- Event: Sanda
Medal record
Representing Philippines
Event	1st	2nd	3rd
World Championships	0	1	1
Southeast Asian Games	0	0	1
Total	0	1	2
World Championships
Silver medal – second place	2023 Fort Worth	52 kg
Bronze medal – third place	2025 Brasília	52 kg
Southeast Asian Games
Bronze medal – third place	2023 Phnom Penh	52 kg

Jenifer Sumagang Kilapio (born October 30, 2000) is a Filipino wushu athlete specializing in sanda, primarily in the 52 kg category.

== Career ==
Kilapio was part of the Filipino team in the 2019 SEA Games.

In May 2023, Kilapio competed at the 2023 SEA Games, where she won the bronze medal. Later that year, she competed in the 2023 World Wushu Championships. After defeating Chhavi Chhavi in the semifinal, she lost to Nguyen Thi Lan in the gold medal match, therefore winning the silver medal.

At the 2025 World Wushu Championships, Kilapio won the bronze medal, which was her second medal in the championships.
