= Wushu at the 2026 Asian Games =

- Venue: Aichi Budokan
- Dates: 20–24 September 2026
- Competitors: 206 from 28 nations

Wushu at the 2026 Asian Games was held between 20 and 24 September 2026 at the Aichi Budokan, Nagoya, Japan.

== Schedule ==
●	Round	P	Round of 32	R	Round of 16	¼	Quarterfinals	½	Semifinals	F	Final

Event↓/Date →	20th Sun	21st Mon	22nd Tue	23rd Wed	24th Thu
Men's changquan	●				
Men's nanquan & nangun			●●		
Men's taijiquan & taijijian		●●			
Men's daoshu & gunshu				●●	
Men's sanda 56 kg		R	¼	½	F
Men's sanda 60 kg		R	¼	½	F
Men's sanda 65 kg	P	R	¼	½	F
Men's sanda 70 kg	R		¼	½	F
Men's sanda 75 kg	R		¼	½	F
Women's changquan		●			
Women's nanquan & nandao			●●		
Women's taijiquan & taijijian	●●				
Women's jianshu & qiangshu				●●	
Women's sanda 52 kg	R		¼	½	F
Women's sanda 60 kg		R	¼	½	F

== Medalists ==
=== Men's taolu ===
Event	Gold	Silver	Bronze
Changquan	Kuong Chi Hin; Macau	Song Chi Kuan; Macau	Seraf Naro Siregar; Indonesia
Nanquan & Nangun	Li Jianming; China	Lau Chi Lung; Hong Kong	Liu Chang-min; Chinese Taipei
Taijiquan & Taijijian	Liu Dewen; China	Sun Chia-hung; Chinese Taipei	An Hyeon-gi; South Korea
Daoshu & Gunshu	Gao Xiaobin; China	Lee Ha-sung; South Korea	Clement Ting; Malaysia

=== Men's sanda ===
Event	Gold	Silver	Bronze
56 kg	Ou Jiaming; China	Đinh Văn Tâm; Vietnam	Saydullo Abdurashitov; Uzbekistan
56 kg	Ou Jiaming; China	Đinh Văn Tâm; Vietnam	Fereddy Sinaga; Indonesia
60 kg	Tang Sishuo; China	Leung Yu Hong; Hong Kong	Bintang Reindra; Indonesia
60 kg	Tang Sishuo; China	Leung Yu Hong; Hong Kong	Hứa Văn Đoàn; Vietnam
65 kg	Wang Chengjin; China	Shoja Panahi; Iran	Nguyễn Khắc Kiên; Vietnam
65 kg	Wang Chengjin; China	Shoja Panahi; Iran	Hamid Ashrafi; Afghanistan
70 kg	Ma Shuo; China	Erfan Moharrami; Iran	Khalid Hotak; Afghanistan
70 kg	Ma Shuo; China	Erfan Moharrami; Iran	Alizhan Ablagatov; Kazakhstan
75 kg	Soheil Mousavi; Iran	Abdurashid Abdullayev; Kazakhstan	Doniyor Turgunbaev; Uzbekistan
75 kg	Soheil Mousavi; Iran	Abdurashid Abdullayev; Kazakhstan	Zhang Huan-yi; Chinese Taipei

=== Women's taolu ===
Event	Gold	Silver	Bronze
Changquan	Lydia Sham; Hong Kong	Sou Cho Man; Macau	Eugenia Diva Widodo; Indonesia
Nanquan & Nandao	Zhang Yaling; China	Darya Latisheva; Uzbekistan	Tan Cheong Min; Malaysia
Taijiquan & Taijijian	Tong Xin; China	Shiho Saito; Japan	Basma Lachkar; Brunei
Taijiquan & Taijijian	Tong Xin; China	Shiho Saito; Japan	Zeanne Law; Singapore
Jianshu & Qiangshu	Yao Yang; China	Nanoha Kida; Japan	Dương Thúy Vi; Vietnam

=== Women's sanda ===
Event	Gold	Silver	Bronze
52 kg	Wu Di; China	Sogand Sinkaei; Iran	Jinnat Akter; Bangladesh
52 kg	Wu Di; China	Sogand Sinkaei; Iran	Chan Tsz Ching; Hong Kong
60 kg	Zhang Xiaoyu; China	Naorem Roshibina Devi; India	Nguyễn Thị Thu Thuỷ; Vietnam
60 kg	Zhang Xiaoyu; China	Naorem Roshibina Devi; India	Thania Kusumaningtyas; Indonesia

== Medal table ==
Rank	Nation	Gold	Silver	Bronze	Total
1	China (CHN)	12	0	0	12
2	Iran (IRI)	1	3	0	4
3	Hong Kong (HKG)	1	2	1	4
4	Macau (MAC)	1	2	0	3
5	Japan (JPN)	0	2	0	2
6	Vietnam (VIE)	0	1	4	5
7	Chinese Taipei (TPE)	0	1	2	3
7	Uzbekistan (UZB)	0	1	2	3
9	Kazakhstan (KAZ)	0	1	1	2
9	South Korea (KOR)	0	1	1	2
11	India (IND)	0	1	0	1
12	Indonesia (INA)	0	0	5	5
13	Afghanistan (AFG)	0	0	2	2
13	Malaysia (MAS)	0	0	2	2
15	Bangladesh (BAN)	0	0	1	1
15	Brunei (BRU)	0	0	1	1
15	Singapore (SGP)	0	0	1	1
Totals (17 entries)		15	15	23	53

== Participating nations ==
A total of 206 athletes from 28 nations competed in wushu at the 2026 Asian Games:

- Afghanistan (4)
- Bangladesh (4)
- Brunei (5)
- China (12)
- Chinese Taipei (10)
- Hong Kong (10)
- India (7)
- Indonesia (13)
- Iran (12)
- Japan (7)
- Kazakhstan (6)
- Kyrgyzstan (4)
- Laos (4)
- Macau (10)
- Malaysia (7)
- Mongolia (6)
- Nepal (10)
- Pakistan (4)
- Philippines (10)
- Singapore (7)
- South Korea (13)
- Sri Lanka (1)
- Tajikistan (4)
- Thailand (6)
- Turkmenistan (5)
- Uzbekistan (9)
- Vietnam (13)
- Yemen (3)
