= 2019 World Wushu Championships =

15th edition of the World Wushu Championships

- Venue: Minhang Gymnasium (capacity: 12,500)
- Location: Shanghai, China
- Start date: October 20, 2019
- End date: October 23, 2019
- Competitors: 362 from 55 nations

The 2019 World Wushu Championships was the 15th edition of the World Wushu Championships. It was held at the Minhang Gymnasium in Shanghai, China from October 20 to October 23, 2019.

== Medal table ==
* Host nation (China)

Rank	NOC	Gold	Silver	Bronze	Total
1	China*	14	1	1	16
2	Iran	8	2	1	11
3	Hong Kong	5	4	1	10
4	Indonesia	3	0	1	4
5	Macau	2	5	5	12
6	Malaysia	2	5	1	8
7	Russia	2	4	3	9
8	India	2	1	1	4
9	South Korea	1	5	6	12
10	Vietnam	1	4	4	9
11	Lebanon	1	1	3	5
12	Philippines	1	1	2	4
13	Chinese Taipei	1	1	0	2
14	Israel	1	0	0	1
15	Egypt	0	1	3	4
16	Turkey	0	1	2	3
16	Ukraine	0	1	2	3
18	Brazil	0	1	1	2
19	Belarus	0	1	0	1
19	Japan	0	1	0	1
19	Kyrgyzstan	0	1	0	1
19	Morocco	0	1	0	1
23	United States	0	0	3	3
23	Uzbekistan	0	0	3	3
25	Algeria	0	0	2	2
25	Germany	0	0	2	2
25	Jordan	0	0	2	2
25	Singapore	0	0	2	2
25	Thailand	0	0	2	2
25	Tunisia	0	0	2	2
31	Armenia	0	0	1	1
31	Azerbaijan	0	0	1	1
31	Canada	0	0	1	1
31	Greece	0	0	1	1
31	Kazakhstan	0	0	1	1
31	Myanmar	0	0	1	1
31	Switzerland	0	0	1	1
Totals (37 entries)		44	42	62	148

== Medalists ==
=== Men's taolu ===
Event	Gold	Silver	Bronze
Changquan	Edgar Xavier Marvelo; Indonesia	Wong Weng Son; Malaysia	Lee Ha-sung; South Korea
Daoshu	Wu Zhaohua; China	Ilias Khusnutdinov; Russia	Jowen Lim; Singapore
Gunshu	Edgar Xavier Marvelo; Indonesia	Cho Seung-jae; South Korea	Jowen Lim; Singapore
Jianshu	Li Qizhen; China	Wong Weng Son; Malaysia	Song Chi Kuan; Macau
Qiangshu	Pavel Muratov; Russia	Wong Weng Son; Malaysia	Song Chi Kuan; Macau
Nanquan	Liang Yongda; China	Lau Chi Lung; Hong Kong	Huang Junhua; Macau
Nandao	Mohammad Ali Mojiri; Iran	Huang Yung-chen; Chinese Taipei	Yun Dong-hae; South Korea
Nangun	Lai Po-wei; Chinese Taipei	Huang Junhua; Macau	Harris Horatius; Indonesia
Taijiquan	Cui Bihui; China	Yu Won-hee; South Korea	Loh Choon How; Malaysia
Taijijian	Samuei Hui; Hong Kong	Cheong Pui Seng; Macau	Yu Won-hee; South Korea
Shuangdao	Cho Seung-jae; South Korea	Viacheslav Krysko; Ukraine	Chio Wai Keong; Macau
Xingyiquan	Chuah Shangyang; Malaysia	Cheong Pui Seng; Macau	Christoph Huynh; Germany
Duilian	Indonesia; Harris Horatius; Edgar Xavier Marvelo; Seraf Naro Siregar	South Korea; Cho Seung-jae; Lee Ha-sung; Lee Yong-mun	Thailand; Jo Saelee; Pitaya Yangrungrawin; Sujinda Yangrungrawin

=== Women's taolu ===
Event	Gold	Silver	Bronze
Changquan	Guo Mengjiao; China	Li Yi; Macau	Zahra Kiani; Iran
Daoshu	Sandra Konstantinova; Russia	Liu Xuxu; Hong Kong	Mia Tian; United States
Gunshu	Liu Xuxu; Hong Kong	Sandra Konstantinova; Russia	Hoàng Thị Phương Giang; Vietnam
Jianshu	Li Yi; Macau	Dương Thúy Vi; Vietnam	Seo Hee-ju; South Korea
Qiangshu	Li Yi; Macau	Dương Thúy Vi; Vietnam	Liudmyla Temna; Ukraine
Nanquan	Tang Lu; China	Tan Cheong Min; Malaysia	He Jianxin; Hong Kong
Nandao	Tan Cheong Min; Malaysia	Hanieh Rajabi; Iran	Darya Latisheva; Uzbekistan
Nangun	He Jianxin; Hong Kong	Hanieh Rajabi; Iran	Lucy Lee; United States
Taijiquan	Liang Biying; China	Shiho Saito; Japan	Trần Thị Minh Huyền; Vietnam
Taijijian	Ju Wenxin; China	Juanita Mok; Hong Kong	Choi Yu-jeong; South Korea
Baguazhang	Chen Suijin; Hong Kong	Choi Yu-jeong; South Korea	Hager Mohamed; Egypt
Shuangjian	Anastasia Chiriliuc; Israel	Sou Cho Man; Macau	Erica Li; Canada
Duilian	Hong Kong; He Jianxin; Liu Xuxu; Yuen Ka Ying	Malaysia; Phoon Eyin; Loh Ying Ting; Tan Cheong Min	Myanmar; Aye Thitsar Myint; Sandy Oo

=== Men's sanda ===
Event	Gold	Silver	Bronze
48 kg	Praveen Kumar; India	Russel Diaz; Philippines	Orkhan Hatamov; Azerbaijan
48 kg	Praveen Kumar; India	Russel Diaz; Philippines	Khasan Ikromov; Uzbekistan
52 kg	Arnel Mandal; Philippines	None awarded	Arsen Baghryan; Armenia
52 kg	Arnel Mandal; Philippines	None awarded	Islam Karimov; Kazakhstan
56 kg	Shen Guoshun; China	Rustam Kakraev; Russia	Tô Văn Báu; Vietnam
56 kg	Shen Guoshun; China	Rustam Kakraev; Russia	Yun Ung-jin; South Korea
60 kg	Pan Lejie; China	Jo Sung-hyun; South Korea	Ali Magomedov; Russia
60 kg	Pan Lejie; China	Jo Sung-hyun; South Korea	Vikrant Baliyan; India
65 kg	Erfan Ahangarian; Iran	Magomed Abdulkhalikov; Russia	Clemente Tabugara; Philippines
65 kg	Erfan Ahangarian; Iran	Magomed Abdulkhalikov; Russia	Akmal Rakhimov; Uzbekistan
70 kg	Mohsen Mohammadseifi; Iran	Alexandre El-Rassi; Lebanon	Lê Tuấn Anh; Vietnam
70 kg	Mohsen Mohammadseifi; Iran	Alexandre El-Rassi; Lebanon	Li Zhaoyang; China
75 kg	Yousef Sabri; Iran	Saad Boujekka; Morocco	Cai Feilong; Macau
75 kg	Yousef Sabri; Iran	Saad Boujekka; Morocco	Mohamed Dhia Laouini; Tunisia
80 kg	Ali Khorshidi; Iran	Cao Lujian; China	Alejandro Cisne; United States
80 kg	Ali Khorshidi; Iran	Cao Lujian; China	Georges Eid; Lebanon
85 kg	Milad Arefi; Iran	Phạm Công Minh; Vietnam	Georges Saade; Lebanon
85 kg	Milad Arefi; Iran	Phạm Công Minh; Vietnam	Yahya Al-Farooq; Jordan
90 kg	You Xiong; China	Vadzim Rolich; Belarus	Mahmoud Al-Naser; Jordan
90 kg	You Xiong; China	Vadzim Rolich; Belarus	Omar Mamdouh; Egypt
+90 kg	Michel Zammar; Lebanon	Kuan Abdyraimov; Kyrgyzstan	Rizvan Kuniev; Russia
+90 kg	Michel Zammar; Lebanon	Kuan Abdyraimov; Kyrgyzstan	Jakob Lenz; Germany

=== Women's sanda ===
Event	Gold	Silver	Bronze
48 kg	Nguyễn Thị Chinh; Vietnam	Yasmin Salim; Egypt	Divine Wally; Philippines
48 kg	Nguyễn Thị Chinh; Vietnam	Yasmin Salim; Egypt	Hayriye Türksoy; Turkey
52 kg	Li Yueyao; China	Yumnam Sanathoi Devi; India	Zeynep Alipaşaoğlu; Turkey
52 kg	Li Yueyao; China	Yumnam Sanathoi Devi; India	Edinéia Camargo; Brazil
56 kg	Li Zhiqin; China	Nguyễn Thị Thu Thuỷ; Vietnam	Amira Salhi; Tunisia
56 kg	Li Zhiqin; China	Nguyễn Thị Thu Thuỷ; Vietnam	Aikaterini Apostolidou; Greece
60 kg	Qi Yumei; China	Tsang Hoi Lan; Hong Kong	Olena Riabokin; Ukraine
60 kg	Qi Yumei; China	Tsang Hoi Lan; Hong Kong	Suchaya Bualuang; Thailand
65 kg	Elaheh Mansourian; Iran	Ece Çakır; Turkey	Yasmina Saidi; Algeria
65 kg	Elaheh Mansourian; Iran	Ece Çakır; Turkey	Lydia Salameh; Lebanon
70 kg	Shahrbanoo Mansourian; Iran	Raíne Martins; Brazil	Priscilla Staubli; Switzerland
70 kg	Shahrbanoo Mansourian; Iran	Raíne Martins; Brazil	Kristina Morozova; Russia
75 kg	Poonam Khatri; India	None awarded	Nesrine Benregreg; Algeria
75 kg	Poonam Khatri; India	None awarded	Heba Abdelkader; Egypt

=== Creative group-set event ===
The results of this event were not added to the combined medal table of the championships.

Event	Gold	Silver	Bronze
Jiti	China	Chinese Taipei	Hong Kong
