= Shiho Saito =

Japanese wushu athlete

Personal information
- Nationality: Japanese
- Born: 23 December 1994 (age 31) Morioka, Iwate, Japan

Sport
- Sport: Wushu
- Events: Taijiquan and taijijian
Medal record
Women's wushu
Representing Japan
Asian Games
Silver medal – second place	2026 Aichi-Nagoya	Taijiquan & taijijian
World Wushu Championships
Gold medal – first place	2025 Brasília	Taijijian
Bronze medal – third place	2025 Brasília	Taijiquan
Taolu World Cup
Gold medal – first place	2024 Yokohama	Taijiquan
Silver medal – second place	2024 Yokohama	Taijijian

Shiho Saito (Japanese: 齋藤 志保; born 23 December 1994) is a Japanese wushu practitioner who competes in taijiquan and taijijian. She has represented Japan at the Asian Games, World Wushu Championships, World Games and Taolu World Cup.

== Career ==
Saito began practising wushu at the age of four, initially training in changquan. She switched to taijiquan at about the age of seven.

Saito competed for Japan at the 2018 Asian Games in Jakarta in the women's taijiquan and taijijian combined event. She later competed in the same event at the 2022 Asian Games in Hangzhou, where she finished sixth with a combined score of 19.440 points.

At the 2024 Taolu World Cup in Yokohama, Saito won the women's taijiquan event with a score of 9.790 and finished second in taijijian with 9.776.

At the 2025 World Games in Chengdu, Saito competed in the women's taijiquan and taijijian combined event. She finished fifth overall, placing sixth in taijiquan and first in taijijian.

At the 2025 World Wushu Championships in Brasília, Saito won the gold medal in women's taijijian and the bronze medal in women's taijiquan. She was subsequently selected to represent Japan at the 2026 Asian Games.

In 2026, Saito competed at the 2026 Taolu World Cup in Haikou, winning the women's taijijian event and finishing third in taijiquan.

At the 2026 Asian Games in Aichi-Nagoya, Saito competed in the women's taijiquan and taijijian combined event. In the taijiquan routine, she scored 9.733 points to finish second behind China's Xin Tong, who scored 9.770. In taijijian, Saito again finished second with 9.740, while Xin Tong scored 9.783. Saito's combined score of 19.473 placed her second overall and earned her the silver medal.

The 2026 Asian Games were Saito's third appearance at the Asian Games. She had announced before the Games that she intended to retire from competitive competition after the event.
