= Nandao =

Chinese sword made for wushu competition

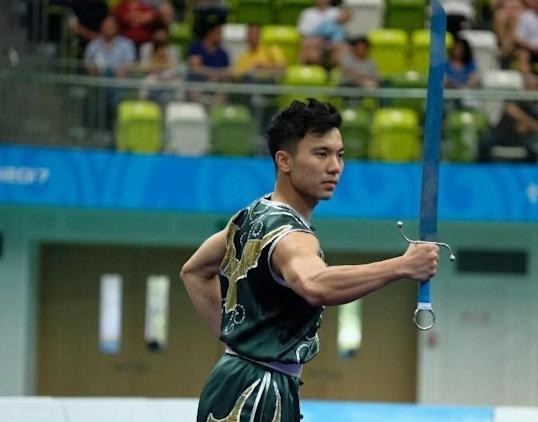
- Leung Cheuk Hei wielding a nandao
- Also known as: Southern Broadsword; Southern Sabre
- Focus: Weapon striking, kicking, jumping
- Country of origin: China
- Date of formation: 1992
- Creator: Chinese Wushu Association
- Parenthood: Daoshu, Nanquan, other Southern Chinese Martial Arts
- Related arts: Nanquan, Nangun
- Olympic sport: Wushu Taolu

Nandao
- Chinese: 南刀
- Literal meaning: southern broadsword
Transcriptions
Standard Mandarin
- Hanyu Pinyin: nándāo
Yue: Cantonese
- Jyutping: naam4 dou1
- IPA: [nȁːmtóu]

A Nandao (Chinese: 南刀; pinyin: Nán dāo) is a kind of dao, or single-edged sword, that is used in contemporary wushu taolu. Ratified for use by the International Wushu Federation in 1992, it has gained widespread popularity worldwide and has become one of the main events at wushu competitions.

== History ==
=== Creation ===
In the 1980s with the development of modern wushu taolu, professors of the Chinese Wushu Association wanted to find a sword or short weapon that would compliment the empty-hand style of nanquan. Among the candidates for consideration were the nine-ring sword, the butterfly sword, the dadao, and the Ghost-head sword, but they were all deemed impractical. During the construction of a compulsory nangun routine, professor Wang Peikun met with Zhou Susheng, coach of the Guangxi Wushu Team to discuss the creation of a new type of sword, the nandao. They found a sword-maker to create prototype nandao sword which were given to the coaches.

Wang and Zhou discussed creating a routine for nandao. After meeting with Beijing Wushu Team coach Xue Yi and Hubei Wushu Team coach Yuan Linlin, Beijing team members Ka Li Abdul and Xu Yi were tasked to draft a routine. After revisions and practice of the new techniques, a demonstration video of the first compulsory routine was filmed with Ka Li as the performer.

=== Spread and international use ===
In 1992, the International Wushu Federation ratified the use of nandao (along with nangun) in international competition. Nandao made its elite-level debut at the 1999 World Wushu Championships in Hong Kong where Ho Ro Bin and Huang Chunni were the first world champions in the event. In 2000, nandao debuted at the Asian Wushu Championships, in 2001 at the SEA Games, and in 2002 at the Asian Games. Starting with the 2008 Beijing Wushu Tournament, nandao in some major multi-sport events started to be only contested by women due to limits in medals quota.

From 1999 to 2004, nandao events in international competitions used the first compulsory routine performed by Ka Li in 1992. With the 2005 IWUF rules revision, the three-score system was introduced and athletes were required to choreograph their own optional routines. In 2012, a new nandao compulsory routine was created as part of the IWUF Third Set of Compulsory Routines. This routine has been only used at the World Junior Wushu Championships since 2013 and at other junior-level competitions worldwide but not at the adult level.

== Scoring and rules ==
=== Apparatus ===
Nandao swords have a blade the shape of a butterfly sword but longer, an s-guard which allows a reverse grip, and a handle length to accommodate single and double wielding grip. In the most recent IWUF rules revision for international competition, the top of the nandao blade should be no shorter than a competitor's jaw if being held with the left hand close to the body.

=== Routines ===
As of the 2024 IWUF rules, nandao routines must be between 1 minute 20 seconds to 1 minute 35 seconds in length. Nandao routines are also required to have the following techniques:

==== Sword techniques ====
- Chán Tóu (缠头) — Broadsword twining
- Guǒ Nǎo (裹脑) — Wrapping with the Broadsword
- Pī Dāo (劈刀) — Broadsword Chop
- Mǒ Dāo (抹刀) — Broadsword Slicing
- Gé Dāo (格刀) — Broadsword Parry
- Jié Dāo (截刀) — Broadsword Intercept
- Sǎo Dāo (扫刀) — Broadsword Sweeping
- Jiǎn Wàn Huā Dāo ( 剪腕花刀) — Broadsword Figure 8

==== Stances ====
- Gōng Bù (弓步) — Bow Stance
- Mǎ Bù (马步) — Horse Stance
- Pū Bù (仆步) — Crouching Stance
- Xū Bù (虚步) — Empty Stance
- Dié Bù (蝶步) — Butterfly Stance
- Qí Lóng Bù (骑龙步) — Dragon Riding Stance

==== Footwork ====
- Qílín Bù (麒麟步) — Kirin steps

==== Leg technique ====
- Héng Dīng Tuǐ (横钉腿) — Horizontal nail kick

=== Scoring criteria ===
Nandao adheres to the same deduction content (A score) and degree of difficulty content and connections (C score) as nanquan and nangun. This three-score system has been in place since the 2005 IWUF rules revision. Only the techniques Chán Tóu (缠头) and Guǒ Nǎo (裹脑) have deduction content (code 62).
