= Taolu World Cup =

International wushu competition

- Genre: Global sports event
- Frequency: Biennial
- Inaugurated: 2016
- Most recent: 2026
- Organiser: IWUF
- Website: Official website

Taolu World Cup
- Simplified Chinese: 武术套路世界杯
- Traditional Chinese: 武術套路世界盃
- Hanyu Pinyin: Wǔshù Tàolù Shìjièbēi

The Taolu World Cup is an elite-level international sports championship hosted by the International Wushu Federation (IWUF) for the sport of wushu taolu. Athletes qualify by placing in the top-eight of a standard taolu event at the prior World Wushu Championships. Renditions in 2016 and 2018 have been held so far with the 3rd Taolu World Cup being rescheduled first for 2022, but later for 2024.

== Events ==
Year	Edition	Location	Events	First of the medal table	Second of the medal table	Third of the medal table
2016	1	Fuzhou, China	22	China	Hong Kong	Indonesia
2018	2	Yangon, Myanmar	22	Hong Kong	China	Malaysia
2024	3	Yokohama, Japan	22	China	Japan	Indonesia
2026	4	Haikou, China	22	China	Hong Kong	Malaysia

== Medal table ==
Last updated after the 3rd Taolu World Cup in 2024.

Rank	Nation	Gold	Silver	Bronze	Total
1	China (CHN)	21	0	0	21
2	Hong Kong (HKG)	13	7	6	26
3	Malaysia (MAS)	8	9	6	23
4	Indonesia (INA)	6	4	5	15
5	Japan (JPN)	5	13	6	24
6	Macau (MAC)	5	4	10	19
7	Chinese Taipei (TPE)	3	7	1	11
8	Vietnam (VIE)	1	5	4	10
9	Russia (RUS)	1	4	2	7
10	Myanmar (MYA)	1	2	2	5
11	Ukraine (UKR)	1	2	0	3
12	Brunei (BRU)	1	1	1	3
13	Singapore (SGP)	0	3	5	8
14	Philippines (PHI)	0	2	1	3
15	Iran (IRI)	0	1	3	4
16	South Korea (KOR)	0	1	2	3
17	India (IND)	0	1	1	2
18	United States (USA)	0	0	4	4
19	Italy (ITA)	0	0	2	2
19	Spain (ESP)	0	0	2	2
21	Nepal (NEP)	0	0	1	1
21	Uzbekistan (UZB)	0	0	1	1
Totals (22 entries)		66	66	65	197

== Statistics ==
=== Multiple gold medalists ===
Rank	Athlete	Country	From	To	Gold	Silver	Bronze	Total
1	Liu Xuxu	Hong Kong	2016	2018	5	0	1	6
2	Wong Weng Son	Malaysia	1993	2003	4	0	2	6
3	Chen Suijin	Hong Kong	2016	2018	4	0	0	4

=== Multiple medalists ===
Rank	Athlete	Country	From	To	Gold	Silver	Bronze	Total
1	Liu Xuxu	Hong Kong	2016	2018	5	0	1	6
2	Wong Weng Son	Malaysia	1993	2003	4	0	2	6
3	Li Yi	Macau	2016	2018	2	2	2	6
6	Tan Cheong Min	Malaysia	2018	2024	2	2	1	5
7	He Jianxin	Hong Kong	2018	2024	2	2	1	5
