= Nangun =

- Also known as: Southern Staff
- Focus: Weapon striking, kicking, jumping
- Country of origin: China
- Date of formation: 1992
- Creator: Chinese Wushu Association
- Parenthood: Gunshu, Nanquan, other Southern Chinese Martial Arts
- Related arts: Nanquan, Nandao
- Olympic sport: Wushu Taolu

The Nangun (Chinese: 南棍; pinyin: nángùn; lit. 'southern staff') is a variation of the application of the "gun" (northern Chinese staff), which is an event in competitive wushu taolu. It is based on staff techniques emanating from Southern Chinese martial arts (nanquan). Its movements stress hitting, in contrast to the cutting and swinging techniques of the northern staff.

== See also ==
- Gun (staff)
