= Taijijian =

Straight sword tradition of tai chi

A traditional Chinese practice taijijian with a solid jichi hardwood (Millettia laurentii) scabbard, upward curving cast alloy Taiji guard, and red pommel tassel (jiansui).

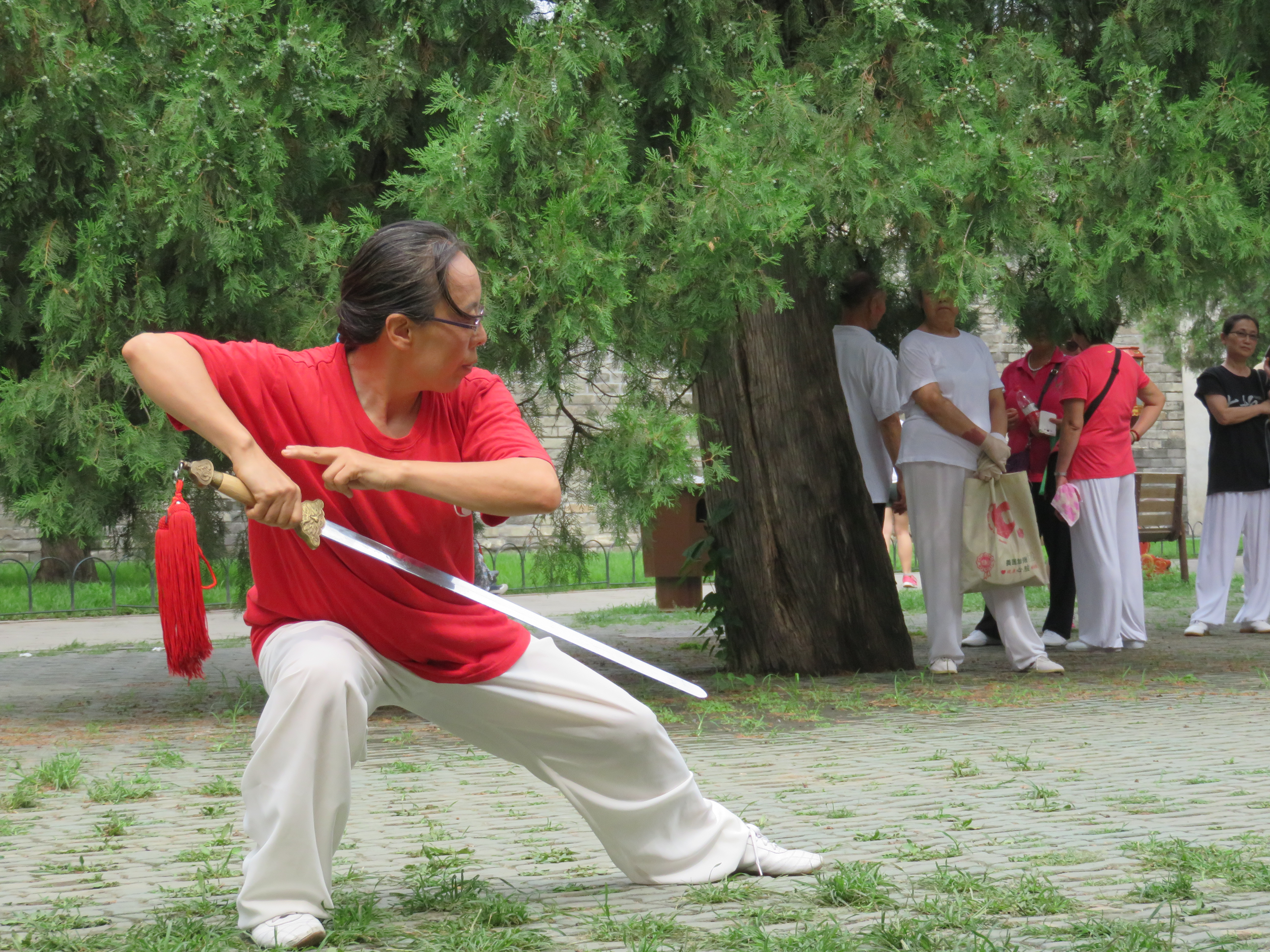
Pan Ying performing taijijian in the Temple of Heaven Park in Beijing.

Taijijian (simplified Chinese: 太极剑; traditional Chinese: 太極劍; pinyin: tàijíjiàn; lit. 'taiji sword') refers both to the straight double edged jian used in tai chi (taijiquan) training and to the solo and paired Chinese swordsmanship curricula preserved within Chinese martial arts. Across traditional family schools and modern wushu programs, practitioners train warmups, solo routines, and partner sensitivity drills with the straight sword to develop whole body coordination, supple wrist mechanics, and weapon handling skill.

== Historical use and lineage routines ==
The Yang and Wu families were involved in Qing dynasty military officer instruction in Beijing and taught jian technique to court guards and civilian disciples. Traditional taijijian forms originated in practical martial application and were designed around standard functional jian of the late imperial period rather than a separate weapon type exclusive to tai chi.

Major tai chi lineages transmit distinct straight sword routines alongside paired blade sensitivity drills: Chen-style tai chi teaches a classical set of 49 or 54 postures combining silk reeling mechanics (chansijin) with brief releases of explosive force (fa jin), Yang-style tai chi teaches a traditional routine of 54 or 67 postures performed at an even tempo, Wu-style tai chi preserves a routine of 108 postures, and Wudangquan lineages practice solo sets alongside paired free sparring (duijian). In 1957, Li Tianji and the Chinese Sports Commission compiled a simplified routine of 32 postures drawn mainly from Yang family swordsmanship, followed later by a standardized competition routine of 42 postures integrating movements from multiple styles.

== Construction and specifications ==
Historical combat jian were forged from laminated high carbon steel with sharp edges and weighed around 1.65 to 2.20 lb (750 to 1,000 g). By contrast, contemporary taijijian built for daily solo practice (練功劍) are unsharpened with rounded tips and lighter mass so students can cultivate balance, a relaxed supple wrist (鬆腕, song wan), a pliable grip (活把, huo ba), and internal power (neijin).

Practice straight swords fall into three broad blade stiffness categories according to training purpose:

- Rigid blades: Shaped from thick steel bar stock or dense hardwood, stiff blades do not flex during movement and are used for paired contact drills (粘連劍), edge alignment checks, and forearm conditioning.
- Semi flexible blades: Traditional solo taijijian practice across Yang, Chen, Wu, and Wudang schools commonly uses an unsharpened blade forged in centers such as Longquan from heat treated martensitic stainless steel (such as 2Cr13 under Chinese standard GB/T 1220, comparable to AISI 420 and SUS420J1, containing roughly 13 percent chromium) or spring tempered carbon steel. Built with a staged thickness taper, the two thirds nearest the guard remain rigid for structural alignment and parries, whereas the distal third flexes moderately on crisp pointing cuts (dian) or short power releases (fa jin) and returns straight without audible tip chatter. Unsteady wrist alignment causes visible tip wobble, providing immediate visual feedback to the practitioner.
- Hyper flexible blades: Contemporary athletic wushu jianshu events employ lightweight spring steel foils (around 0.7 to 0.9 lb or 300 to 400 g) rolled very thin near the point so the tip whips and snaps audibly during rapid flicking actions and aerial jumps. Traditional tai chi schools generally avoid foil weight blades because minimal tip mass obscures blade tracking.

Close up showing an upward curving cast alloy crossguard (hushou) with Taiji and Bagua reliefs, a 2Cr13 stainless steel practice blade, and a matching scabbard throat collar.

Adult solo practice taijijian with staged semi flexible steel blades typically weigh around 1.30 to 1.39 lb (590 to 630 g) unscabbarded, with a point of balance around 2.4 to 3.5 in (6.0 to 9.0 cm) ahead of the guard. Placing the center of mass slightly forward of the guard (hushou, 護手) lets waist rotation guide the momentum of the blade tip during circular cuts without overloading wrist or elbow tendons across extended 32 posture, 42 posture, or traditional family sets. The upward curving guard, scabbard throat collar, and pommel are commonly cast from corrosion resistant metal alloy or brass sculpted with liangyi (兩儀), Qiankun (乾坤), and Bagua motifs to serve as a rear counterweight and resist tarnishing from palm sweat, while some blades bear Seven Stars of the Northern Dipper (北斗七星, Beidou Qixing) motifs etched on the flat.

Detail of a solid jichi hardwood (Millettia laurentii) handle (jianbing) displaying its feather grain paired with a cast alloy Bagua guard.

Traditional handles (劍柄) and scabbards (劍鞘) are shaped from solid hardwoods such as jichi wood (雞翅木, Millettia laurentii), a dense tropical timber classified under the Chinese national hongmu standard (GB/T 18107) and rated around 1,930 lbf (8,580 N) on the Janka hardness test. To keep the steel blade from scraping against bare metal fittings and to buffer seasonal wood expansion and shrinkage between humid summers and dry heated indoor winters, contemporary hardwood scabbards often seat a recessed protective liner inside the metal throat collar so draw retention stays smooth without rattling or binding. A cord tassel (劍穗, jiansui) may be attached to the pommel ring to train coordinated movement between the waist and sword hand. Because martensitic stainless practice blades resist corrosion from sweat and morning dew, routine care requires wiping the steel dry after training and applying a thin coat of mineral oil periodically.

In traditional instruction, a student checks sword length by holding the guard in a relaxed reverse carry behind the vertical forearm while standing upright; the tip reaches roughly to the level of the earlobe. Across modern standardized solo practice swords built with an 8.3 to 8.7 in (21 to 22 cm) handle, nominal blade tiers correspond to practitioner height as follows:

Practice Taijijian Stature Sizing and Balance Reference
Nominal Blade Tier	Overall Length	Blade Length	Hilt Length	Point of Balance (past guard)	Bare Sword Weight	Recommended Practitioner Height
28 in	36.2 in (92 cm)	28.0 in (71 cm)	8.3 in (21 cm)	around 2.4 in (6.0 cm)	around 1.30 lb (590 g)	Up to 5 ft 3 in (160 cm and under)
30 in	38.6 in (98 cm)	30.3 in (77 cm)	8.3 in (21 cm)	around 3.3 in (8.5 cm)	around 1.32 lb (600 g)	5 ft 3.5 in to 5 ft 8 in (161 to 173 cm)
32 in	40.9 in (104 cm)	32.3 in (82 cm)	8.7 in (22 cm)	around 3.5 in (9.0 cm)	around 1.39 lb (630 g)	5 ft 8.5 in and taller (174 cm and above)

== See also ==
- Jian
- Tai chi
- Chinese swordsmanship
