= World Junior Wushu Championships =

International youth wushu competition

- Genre: Global event
- Frequency: Biennial
- Inaugurated: 2006
- Most recent: 2024
- Organiser: IWUF
- Website: Official website

The World Junior Wushu Championships (WJWC) is an international wushu competition organized by the International Wushu Federation (IWUF) for competitors below 18 years of age. There are three age groups for the Taolu events and there is also a Sanda category.

== History ==
=== Taolu ===
Group A has existed since the first rendition of the championships. The age group was originally 16-18 but changed to 15-17 as a result of a vote in 2019. From 2006 to 2012, Group A athletes were required to compete using the IWUF second set of compulsory routines. In 2014 and 2016, this was changed to the IWUF third set of compulsory routines. In early 2018, Group A were allowed to do optional routines instead of compulsory routines, and would be judged without the Degree of Difficulty requirement.

Group A athletes who placed in the top six in the 2014 World Junior Wushu Championships were allowed to compete in the 2014 Summer Youth Olympics in Nanjing, China where Wushu was a demonstration sport. Wushu was also part of the 2014 Nanjing Sports Lab which was a promotional event for non-Olympic sports which also included sport climbing, skateboarding, and roller skating. Group A athletes who qualify would also be able to compete in the Wushu event at the 2022 Summer Youth Olympics in Dakar, Senegal, which has been postponed to 2026.

Group B has existed since the first rendition of the championships. The age group was originally 13-15 but changed to 12-14 as a result of a vote in 2019. Group B athletes have always been required to compete with the IWUF first set of compulsory routines.

Group C was introduced in 2008. The age group was originally 9-12 but changed to 7-11 as a result of a vote in 2019. Group C athletes have always been required to compete with the IWUF elementary routines.

=== Sanshou ===
For most of sanda's history, the competition was held without any age categories, only different weight categories. In 2018, the rules were revised to include distinct "junior" and "children" age categories with their own distinct weight category brackets.

== Editions ==
Year	Edition	Location	Events	Results
2006	1	Kuala Lumpur, Malaysia	48	
2008	2	Bali, Indonesia	64	
2010	3	Singapore	62	
2012	4	Macau	64	
2014	5	Antalya, Turkey	64	
2016	6	Burgas, Bulgaria	64	
2018	7	Brasília, Brazil	69	
2022	8	Tangerang, Indonesia	69	
2024	9	Bandar Seri Begawan, Brunei	81	
2026	10	Tianjin, China	79	

- 2020 in Rabat, Morocco was cancelled.

== Medals (2014 - 2026) ==
Rank	Nation	Gold	Silver	Bronze	Total
1	China (CHN)	70	15	6	91
2	Hong Kong (HKG)	51	42	37	130
3	Iran (IRI)	46	35	26	107
4	Indonesia (INA)	33	43	42	118
5	Malaysia (MAS)	31	42	32	105
6	Singapore (SGP)	26	40	24	90
7	Macau (MAC)	24	27	31	82
8	Vietnam (VIE)	23	19	26	68
9	United States (USA)	21	20	28	69
10	Japan (JPN)	15	17	12	44
11	Canada (CAN)	15	7	13	35
12	Egypt (EGY)	9	20	26	55
13	South Korea (KOR)	8	16	14	38
14	India (IND)	8	12	16	36
15	Chinese Taipei (TPE)	5	11	4	20
16	Ukraine (UKR)	5	5	6	16
17	Russia (RUS)	4	4	9	17
18	Brunei (BRU)	4	4	4	12
19	Kazakhstan (KAZ)	3	5	12	20
20	Turkey (TUR)	3	4	10	17
21	Uzbekistan (UZB)	2	4	5	11
22	Philippines (PHI)	2	3	8	13
23	Armenia (ARM)	2	1	6	9
24	Belarus (BLR)	2	1	2	5
25	Tunisia (TUN)	1	1	8	10
26	New Zealand (NZL)	1	1	2	4
27	France (FRA)	1	0	8	9
28	Turkmenistan (TKM)	1	0	3	4
29	Georgia (GEO)	1	0	1	2
30	Italy (ITA)	0	2	4	6
31	Brazil (BRA)	0	2	3	5
32	Algeria (ALG)	0	1	3	4
32	Australia (AUS)	0	1	3	4
34	Afghanistan (AFG)	0	1	1	2
35	Laos (LAO)	0	1	0	1
36	Azerbaijan (AZE)	0	0	4	4
37	Lebanon (LIB)	0	0	3	3
38	Kyrgyzstan (KGZ)	0	0	2	2
38	Mexico (MEX)	0	0	2	2
38	Palestine (PSE)	0	0	2	2
38	Romania (ROU)	0	0	2	2
42	Argentina (ARG)	0	0	1	1
42	Croatia (CRO)	0	0	1	1
42	Czech Republic (CZE)	0	0	1	1
42	Germany (GER)	0	0	1	1
42	Jordan (JOR)	0	0	1	1
42	Kuwait (KUW)	0	0	1	1
42	Netherlands (NED)	0	0	1	1
42	Paraguay (PAR)	0	0	1	1
42	Peru (PER)	0	0	1	1
42	Saudi Arabia (KSA)	0	0	1	1
42	Senegal (SEN)	0	0	1	1
42	Uruguay (URU)	0	0	1	1
42	Yemen (YEM)	0	0	1	1
Totals (54 entries)		417	407	463	1,287

== See also ==
- Wushu (sport)
- World Wushu Championships
- International Wushu Federation
- 2014 Summer Youth Olympics
