= Wushu at the 2018 Asian Games =

- Venue: Jakarta International Expo
- Dates: 19–23 August 2018
- Competitors: 201 from 27 nations

Wushu at the 2018 Asian Games was held at the Jakarta International Expo, Jakarta, Indonesia, from 19 to 23 August 2018.

== Schedule ==
●	Round	●	Last round	P	Round of 32	R	Round of 16	¼	Quarterfinals	½	Semifinals	F	Final

Event↓/Date →	19th Sun	20th Mon	21st Tue	22nd Wed	23rd Thu
Men's changquan	●				
Men's nanquan & nangun		●	●		
Men's taijiquan & taijijian			●	●	
Men's daoshu & gunshu		●	●		
Men's sanda 56 kg	P	R	¼	½	F
Men's sanda 60 kg	P	R	¼	½	F
Men's sanda 65 kg		R	¼	½	F
Men's sanda 70 kg	R		¼	½	F
Women's changquan				●	
Women's nanquan & nandao	●	●			
Women's taijiquan & taijijian	●	●			
Women's jianshu & qiangshu	●		●		
Women's sanda 52 kg	R		¼	½	F
Women's sanda 60 kg	R		¼	½	F

== Medalists ==
=== Men's taolu ===
Event	Gold	Silver	Bronze
Changquan	Sun Peiyuan; China	Edgar Xavier Marvelo; Indonesia	Tsai Tse-min; Chinese Taipei
Nanquan & Nangun	Huang Junhua; Macau	Phạm Quốc Khánh; Vietnam	Lee Yong-mun; South Korea
Taijiquan & Taijijian	Chen Zhouli; China	Tomohiro Araya; Japan	Nyein Chan Ko Ko; Myanmar
Daoshu & Gunshu	Wu Zhaohua; China	Cho Seung-jae; South Korea	Achmad Hulaefi; Indonesia

=== Men's sanda ===
Event	Gold	Silver	Bronze
56 kg	Shen Guoshun; China	Bùi Trường Giang; Vietnam	Yusuf Widiyanto; Indonesia
56 kg	Shen Guoshun; China	Bùi Trường Giang; Vietnam	Santosh Kumar; India
60 kg	Erfan Ahangarian; Iran	Wang Xuetao; China	Nghiêm Văn Ý Vietnam
60 kg	Erfan Ahangarian; Iran	Wang Xuetao; China	Surya Bhanu Pratap Singh; India
65 kg	Li Mengfan; China	Foroud Zafari; Iran	Narender Grewal; India
65 kg	Li Mengfan; China	Foroud Zafari; Iran	Khalid Hotak; Afghanistan
70 kg	Mohsen Mohammadseifi; Iran	Shi Zhanwei; China	Puja Riyaya; Indonesia
70 kg	Mohsen Mohammadseifi; Iran	Shi Zhanwei; China	Ham Gwan-sik; South Korea

=== Women's taolu ===
Event	Gold	Silver	Bronze
Changquan	Qi Xinyi; China	Li Yi; Macau	Hoàng Thị Phương Giang; Vietnam
Nanquan & Nandao	Tang Lu; China	Darya Latisheva; Uzbekistan	Yuen Ka Ying; Hong Kong
Taijiquan & Taijijian	Lindswell Kwok; Indonesia	Juanita Mok; Hong Kong	Agatha Wong; Philippines
Jianshu & Qiangshu	Guo Mengjiao; China	Zahra Kiani; Iran	Dương Thúy Vi; Vietnam

=== Women's sanda ===
Event	Gold	Silver	Bronze
52 kg	Li Yueyao; China	Elaheh Mansourian; Iran	Divine Wally; Philippines
52 kg	Li Yueyao; China	Elaheh Mansourian; Iran	Chen Wei-ting; Chinese Taipei
60 kg	Cai Yingying; China	Shahrbanoo Mansourian; Iran	Suchaya Bualuang; Thailand
60 kg	Cai Yingying; China	Shahrbanoo Mansourian; Iran	Naorem Roshibina Devi; India

== Medal table ==
Rank	Nation	Gold	Silver	Bronze	Total
1	China (CHN)	10	2	0	12
2	Iran (IRI)	2	4	0	6
3	Indonesia (INA)	1	1	3	5
4	Macau (MAC)	1	1	0	2
5	Vietnam (VIE)	0	2	3	5
6	South Korea (KOR)	0	1	2	3
7	Hong Kong (HKG)	0	1	1	2
8	Japan (JPN)	0	1	0	1
8	Uzbekistan (UZB)	0	1	0	1
10	India (IND)	0	0	4	4
11	Chinese Taipei (TPE)	0	0	2	2
11	Philippines (PHI)	0	0	2	2
13	Afghanistan (AFG)	0	0	1	1
13	Myanmar (MYA)	0	0	1	1
13	Thailand (THA)	0	0	1	1
Totals (15 entries)		14	14	20	48

== Participating nations ==
A total of 201 athletes from 27 nations competed in wushu at the 2018 Asian Games:

- Afghanistan (5)
- Brunei (4)
- China (13)
- Chinese Taipei (10)
- Hong Kong (8)
- India (13)
- Indonesia (13)
- Iran (9)
- Japan (6)
- Kazakhstan (8)
- Kyrgyzstan (4)
- Laos (6)
- Lebanon (1)
- Macau (9)
- Malaysia (7)
- Myanmar (9)
- Nepal (10)
- Pakistan (9)
- Philippines (8)
- Singapore (5)
- South Korea (12)
- Sri Lanka (2)
- Tajikistan (1)
- Thailand (9)
- Uzbekistan (4)
- Vietnam (12)
- Yemen (4)
