= 2016 Asian Wushu Championships =

9th edition of the Asian Wushu Championships

- Venue: Taoyuan Arena (capacity: 15,000)
- Location: Taoyuan, Taiwan
- Start date: September 1, 2016
- End date: September 5, 2016

The 2016 Asian Wushu Championships was the 9th edition of the Asian Wushu Championships. It was held at the Taoyuan Arena from September 1-5, 2016.

== Medal table ==
Taolu only

* Host nation (Chinese Taipei)

| Rank | Nation | Gold | Silver | Bronze | Total |
|---|---|---|---|---|---|
| 1 | China (CHN) | 11 | 0 | 0 | 11 |
| 2 | Hong Kong (HKG) | 3 | 3 | 5 | 11 |
| 3 | Macau (MAC) | 2 | 1 | 4 | 7 |
| 4 | Chinese Taipei (TPE)* | 1 | 4 | 4 | 9 |
| 5 | Malaysia (MAS) | 1 | 4 | 2 | 7 |
| 6 | Vietnam (VIE) | 1 | 2 | 3 | 6 |
| 7 | Iran (IRI) | 1 | 2 | 0 | 3 |
| 8 | South Korea (KOR) | 1 | 1 | 2 | 4 |
| 9 | Myanmar (MYA) | 1 | 1 | 1 | 3 |
| 9 | Singapore (SGP) | 1 | 1 | 1 | 3 |
| 11 | Japan (JPN) | 0 | 3 | 0 | 3 |
| 12 | Indonesia (INA) | 0 | 1 | 0 | 1 |
| 13 | Philippines (PHI) | 0 | 0 | 1 | 1 |
| Totals (13 entries) | | 23 | 23 | 23 | 69 |

== Medalists ==
=== Taolu ===
==== Men ====
| Event | Gold | Silver | Bronze |
|---|---|---|---|
| Changquan | Wu Zhaohua; China | Tsai Tse-min; Chinese Taipei | Yeap Wai Kin; Malaysia |
| Daoshu | Cho Seung-jae; South Korea | Jowen Lim; Singapore | Tsai Tse-min; Chinese Taipei |
| Gunshu | Zhu Leiming; China | Tran Xuan Hiep; Vietnam | Tsai Tse-min; Chinese Taipei |
| Jianshu | Wong Weng Son; Malaysia | Tomoya Okawa; Japan | Chu Chi Wai; Macau |
| Qiangshu | Chu Chi Wai; Macau | Resa Khalaf Zadeh; Iran | Yeap Wai Kin; Malaysia |
| Nanquan | Liang Yongda; China | Lai Po-wei; Chinese Taipei | Huang Junhua; Macau |
| Nandao | Li Jianming; China | Farshad Arabi; Iran | Lai Po-wei; Chinese Taipei |
| Nangun | Hsu Kai-kuei; Chinese Taipei | Leung Cheuk Hei; Hong Kong | Huang Junhua; Macau |
| Taijiquan | Samuei Hui; Hong Kong | Jack Loh; Malaysia | Zhuang Jiahong; Hong Kong |
| Taijijian | Yang Shunhong; China | Tomohiro Araya; Japan | Chen Yu-wei; Chinese Taipei |
| Duilian | Iran; Mohsen Ahmadi; Reza Khalaf Zadeh; Amir Mohammadrezaei Arrehkamar | Chinese Taipei; Lai Po-wei; Hsu Kai-kuei; Tsai Tse-min | Singapore; Jesse Colin Adalia; Yong Yi Xiang; Jowen Lim |

==== Women ====
| Event | Gold | Silver | Bronze |
|---|---|---|---|
| Changquan | Dai Xuli; China | Li Yi; Macau | Liu Xuxu; Hong Kong |
| Daoshu | Wu Lingzhi; China | Chai Fong Wei; Malaysia | Liu Xuxu; Hong Kong |
| Gunshu | Liu Xuxu; Hong Kong | Felda Elvira Santoso; Indonesia | Sou Cho Man; Macau |
| Jianshu | Li Yi; Macau | Seo Hee-ju; South Korea | Je Ga-yeong; South Korea |
| Qiangshu | Guo Mengjiao; China | Keiko Yamaguchi; Japan | Duong Thuy Vi; Vietnam |
| Nanquan | Chen Huiying; China | Diana Bong; Malaysia | Aye Thitsar Myint; Myanmar |
| Nandao | Aye Thitsar Myint; Myanmar | Yuen Ka Ying; Hong Kong | Nguyen Thuy Linh; Vietnam |
| Nangun | Tang Lu; China | Diana Bong; Malaysia | Nguyen Thuc Anh; Vietnam |
| Taijiquan | Chen Suijin; Hong Kong | Tran Thi Khanh Ly; Vietnam | Park Min-hee; South Korea |
| Taijijian | Tran Thi Khanh Ly; Vietnam | Chen Suijin; Hong Kong | Agatha Wong; Philippines |
| Duilian | Singapore; Fung Hui Xin; Emily Sin | Myanmar; Aye Thitsar Myint; Myat Thet Hsu Wai Phyo | Hong Kong; Yuen Ka Ying; He Jianxin; Lydia Sham |

==== Mixed ====
| Event | Gold | Silver | Bronze |
|---|---|---|---|
| Taijiquan Doubles | China; Huang Zhikun; Liu Fangfang | Chinese Taipei; Sun Chia-hung; Chen Yu-wei | Hong Kong; Chen Suijin; Zhuang Jiahong |

== See also ==
- List of sporting events in Taiwan
