= 2012 Asian Wushu Championships =

8th edition of the Asian Wushu Championships

- Venue: Phu Tho Arena (capacity: 5,000)
- Location: Ho Chi Minh City, Vietnam
- Start date: August 21, 2012
- End date: August 25, 2012
- Competitors: 350 from 22 nations

The 2012 Asian Wushu Championships was the 8th edition of the Asian Wushu Championships. It was held at the Phu Tho Arena in Ho Chi Minh City, Vietnam, from August 21–25, 2012.

== Medal table ==
Taolu only

* Host nation (Vietnam)

Rank	Nation	Gold	Silver	Bronze	Total
1	China (CHN)	9	0	0	9
2	Vietnam (VIE)*	3	6	3	12
3	Hong Kong (HKG)	3	3	3	9
4	Malaysia (MAS)	2	5	2	9
5	Macau (MAC)	2	2	4	8
6	Japan (JPN)	1	3	2	6
7	South Korea (KOR)	1	1	0	2
8	Brunei (BRU)	1	0	0	1
9	Iran (IRI)	0	1	2	3
10	Chinese Taipei (TPE)	0	1	0	1
11	Indonesia (INA)	0	0	2	2
11	Singapore (SGP)	0	0	2	2
13	Myanmar (MYA)	0	0	1	1
13	Philippines (PHI)	0	0	1	1
Totals (14 entries)		22	22	22	66

== Medalists ==
=== Taolu ===
==== Men ====
Event	Gold	Silver	Bronze
Changquan	Wang Xi; China	Daisuke Ichikizaki; Japan	Nguyễn Mạnh Quyền; Vietnam
Daoshu	Jia Rui; Macau	Tran Xuan Hiep; Vietnam	Daisuke Ichikizaki; Japan
Gunshu	Nguyễn Mạnh Quyền; Vietnam	Cho Seung-jae; South Korea	Jia Rui; Macau
Jianshu	Nguyen Huy Thanh; Vietnam	Chen Riquo; Hong Kong	Muhammad Abdul Harist; Indonesia
Qiangshu	Yu Te; China	Chen Riquo; Hong Kong	Etsuro Shitaokoshi; Japan
Nanquan	Li Fukui; China	Ho Mun Hua; Malaysia	Huang Junhua; Macau
Nandao	Wu Jielong; China	Phạm Quốc Khánh; Vietnam	Farshad Arabi; Iran
Nangun	Kim Tae-ho; South Korea	Phạm Quốc Khánh; Vietnam	Soc Kyaw; Myanmar
Taijiquan	Nguyễn Thanh Tùng; Vietnam	Iao Chon In; Macau	Seet Wee Key; Singapore
Taijijian	Chen Zhouli; China	Lee Yang; Japan	Seet Wee Key; Singapore
Duilian	Hong Kong; Leung Ka Wai; Tang Siu Kong; Cheng Chung Hang	Iran; Mohsen Ahmadi; Ebrahim Fathi; Navid Makvandi	Philippines; Engelbert Addongan john Keithley Chan; Eleazar Jacob

==== Women ====
Event	Gold	Silver	Bronze
Changquan	Liu Xia; China	Li Yi; Macau	Geng Xiaoling; Hong Kong
Daoshu	Geng Xiaoling; Hong Kong	Hoàng Thị Phương Giang; Vietnam	Chai Fong Wei; Malaysia
Gunshu	Geng Xiaoling; Hong Kong	Chai Fong Wei; Malaysia	Hanieh Rajabi; Iran
Jianshu	Gu Xiuhong; China	Duong Thuy Vi; Vietnam	Li Yi; Macau
Qiangshu	Li Yi; Macau	Keiko Yamaguchi; Japan	Phoon Eyin; Malaysia
Nanquan	Wei Hailing; China	Diana Bong; Malaysia	Yuen Ka Ying; Hong Kong
Nandao	Diana Bong; Malaysia	Tsai Wen-chuan; Chinese Taipei	Tan Dong Mei; Macau
Nangun	Tai Cheau Xuen; Malaysia	Diana Bong; Malaysia	Tan Dong Mei; Macau
Taijiquan	Ai Miyaoka; Japan	Chai Fong Ying; Malaysia	Tran Thi Minh Huyen; Vietnam
Taijijian	Yu Mengmeng; China	Ai Miyaoka; Japan	Lindswell; Indonesia
Duilian	Brunei; Faustina Woo Wai Sii; Lee Ying Shi	Hong Kong; Fung Wing See; Kwan Ning Wai; Yuen Ka Ying	Vietnam; Hoàng Thị Phương Giang; Dương Thúy Vi
