= 2018 Taolu World Cup =

2nd edition of the Taolu World Cup

- Venue: Thuwunna National Indoor Stadium (1)
- Location: Yangon, Myanmar
- Start date: November 14, 2018
- End date: November 18, 2018

The 2018 Taolu World Cup was the second edition of the Taolu World Cup. It was held at the Thuwunna National Indoor Stadium (1) in Yangon, Myanmar from November 14 to 18, 2018. Athletes qualified for this competition by placing in the top-eight of any taolu individual event at the 2017 World Wushu Championships.

== Medal summary ==
=== Medal table ===
* Host nation (Myanmar)

Rank	NOC	Gold	Silver	Bronze	Total
1	Hong Kong	6	2	2	10
2	China	6	0	0	6
3	Malaysia	5	1	2	8
4	Vietnam	1	3	1	5
5	Macau	1	2	4	7
6	Myanmar*	1	2	2	5
7	Russia	1	2	1	4
8	Ukraine	1	1	0	2
9	Japan	0	3	1	4
10	Chinese Taipei	0	3	0	3
11	Singapore	0	1	1	2
12	India	0	1	0	1
12	Philippines	0	1	0	1
14	United States	0	0	3	3
15	South Korea	0	0	2	2
16	Indonesia	0	0	1	1
16	Spain	0	0	1	1
Totals (17 entries)		22	22	21	65

=== Men ===
Event	Gold	Silver	Bronze
Changquan	Chang Zhizhao; China	Yong Yi Xiang; Singapore	Song Chi Kuan; Macau
Daoshu	Li Zhifeng; China	Wang Chen-ming; Chinese Taipei	Ilias Khusnutdinov; Russia
Gunshu	Ilias Khusnutdinov; Russia	Wang Chen-ming; Chinese Taipei	Lee Yong-hyun; South Korea
Jianshu	Wong Weng Son; Malaysia	Tomoya Okawa; Japan	Lee Ha-sung; South Korea
Qiangshu	Wong Weng Son; Malaysia	Tomoya Okawa; Japan	Muhammad Daffa Golden Boy; Indonesia
Nanquan	Li Jianming; China	Phạm Quốc Khánh; Vietnam	Chio Wai Keong; Macau
Nandao	Huang Junhua; Macau	Lai Po-wei; Chinese Taipei	Leung Cheuk Hei; Hong Kong
Nangun	Cao Khắc Đạt; Vietnam	Thornton Sayan; Philippines	Huang Junhua; Macau
Taijiquan	Yang Shunhong; China	Samuei Hui; Hong Kong	Nyein Chan Ko Ko; Myanmar
Taijijian	Nyein Chan Ko Ko; Myanmar	Samuei Hui; Hong Kong	Zhuang Jiahong; Hong Kong
Duilian	Ukraine; Daniil Feshcenko; Artem Suong; Roman Reva	India; Anjul Namedo; Chirag Sharma; Aditya Kumar	none awarded

=== Women ===
Event	Gold	Silver	Bronze
Changquan	Wang Xue; China	Ganna Tereshchenko; Ukraine	Sou Cho Man; Macau
Daoshu	Liu Xuxu; Hong Kong	Sandra Konstantinova; Russia	Mia Tian; United States
Gunshu	Liu Xuxu; Hong Kong	Sandra Konstantinova; Russia	Hoàng Thị Phương Giang; Vietnam
Jianshu	Phoon Eyin; Malaysia	Li Yi; Macau	Paloma Panos Milla; Spain
Qiangshu	Phoon Eyin; Malaysia	Sandi Oo; Myanmar	Keiko Yamaguchi; Japan
Nanquan	Chen Huiying; China	Tan Cheong Min; Malaysia	Lucy Lee; United States
Nandao	He Jianxin; Hong Kong	Aye Thitsar Myint; Myanmar	Tan Cheong Min; Malaysia
Nangun	He Jianxin; Hong Kong	Nguyễn Thục Anh; Vietnam	Aye Thitsar Myint; Myanmar
Taijiquan	Chen Suijin; Hong Kong	Shiho Sato; Japan	Vera Tan; Singapore
Taijijian	Chen Suijin; Hong Kong	Trần Thị Minh Huyền; Vietnam	Audrey Chan; Malaysia
Duilian	Malaysia; Tan Cheong Min; Phoon Eyin; Loh Ying Ting	Macau; Li Yi; Sou Cho Man	United States; Mia Tian; Lucy Lee
