= Seo Hee-ju =

Korean wushu practitioner

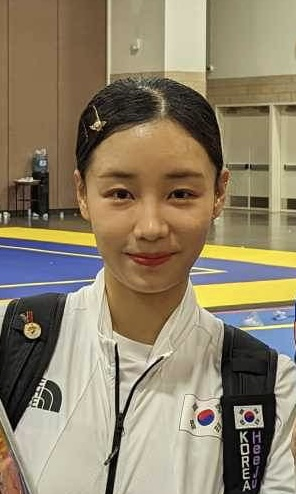
- Seo Hee-ju at the 2023 World Wushu Championships in Fort Worth, USA

Personal information
- Born: November 18, 1993 (age 32)
- Height: 1.63 m (5 ft 4 in)
- Weight: 53 kg (117 lb)

Korean name
- Hangul: 서희주
- RR: Seo Huiju
- MR: Sŏ Hŭiju

Sport
- Sport: Wushu
- Events: Changquan, Jianshu, Qiangshu
- Team: Korean Wushu Team
Medal record
Women's Wushu Taolu
Representing South Korea
World Games
Bronze medal – third place	2022 Birmingham	Jianshu+Qiangshu
World Championships
Gold medal – first place	2015 Jakarta	Jianshu
Gold medal – first place	2017 Kazan	Jianshu
Silver medal – second place	2017 Kazan	Qiangshu
Silver medal – second place	2023 Fort Worth	Qiangshu
Bronze medal – third place	2019 Shanghai	Jianshu
Asian Games
Bronze medal – third place	2014 Incheon	Jianshu+Qiangshu
Asian Championships
Silver medal – second place	2016 Taoyuan	Jianshu
Universiade
Silver medal – second place	2017 Taipei	Jianshu+Qiangshu

Seo Hee-ju (Korean: 서희주; born November 18, 1993) is a retired wushu taolu athlete from South Korea. She was a two-time world champion and medalist at the World Games and the Asian Games.

== Career ==
Seo made her international debut at the 2009 World Wushu Championships where she finished sixth in qiangshu. She then competed in the 2010 Asian Games and finished 8th in women's changquan. At the 2011 World Wushu Championships, she finished sixth in jianshu. Two years later at the 2013 World Wushu Championships, she finished sixth in changquan and eighth in jianshu.

A year later at the 2014 Asian Games in Incheon, she won the bronze medal in women's jianshu and qiangshu. A year later, she competed in the 2015 World Wushu Championships and became the world champion in jianshu. She continued to hold this title at the 2017 World Wushu Championships in addition to winning the silver medal in qiangshu. During training a day before she competed at the 2018 Asian Games, she injured her knee and had to withdraw from the competition. A year later, she returned to competition and won the bronze medal in jianshu at the 2019 World Wushu Championships.

After the start of the COVID-19 pandemic, her first major appearance was at the 2022 World Games where she won the bronze medal in jianshu and qiangshu combined. A year later, she competed in the 2022 Asian Games (held in September 2023) and finished fourth in women's jianshu and qiangshu. A few months later, she competed in the 2023 World Wushu Championships and won the silver medal in qiangshu. She then declared her retirement shortly after the competition.

== See also ==
- List of Asian Games medalists in wushu
