= Samuei Hui =

Chinese wushu practitioner

Personal information
- Full name: Samuei Tak-Yan Hui
- Born: June 6, 1997 (age 29)
- Occupation(s): Martial artist, athlete
- Height: 1.79 m (5 ft 10 in)
- Weight: 70 kg (154 lb)

Sport
- Sport: Wushu
- Event(s): Taijiquan, Taijijian
- Team: Hong Kong Wushu Team
Medal record
Men's Wushu Taolu
Representing Hong Kong
World Championships
Gold medal – first place	2019 Shanghai	Taijijian
Silver medal – second place	2017 Kazan	Taijiquan
Silver medal – second place	2025 Brasília	Taijiquan
Silver medal – second place	2025 Brasília	Taijijian
Bronze medal – third place	2017 Kazan	Taijijian
World Cup
Silver medal – second place	2016 Fuzhou	Taijijian
Silver medal – second place	2018 Yangon	Taijijian
Silver medal – second place	2018 Yangon	Taijiquan
World University Games
Gold medal – first place	2021 Chengdu	Taijijian
Bronze medal – third place	2021 Chengdu	Taijiquan
Asian Championships
Gold medal – first place	2016 Taoyuan	Taijiquan
Gold medal – first place	2024 Macau	Taijiquan Pair
Asian Games
Silver medal – second place	2023 Hangzhou	Taijiquan+Taijijian
Asian Cup
Gold medal – first place	2025 Songyuan	Taijijian
World Junior Championships
Silver medal – second place	2012 Macau	Taijiquan B
Silver medal – second place	2012 Macau	Taijijian B
Silver medal – second place	2012 Macau	Qiangshu B

Samuei Tak-Yan Hui (Chinese: 許得恩; pinyin: Xǔdé'ēn; born: June 6, 1997) is a wushu taolu athlete from Hong Kong.

== Career ==
Hui was a triple silver medalist at the 2012 World Junior Wushu Championships.

Hui made his international senior debut at the 2015 World Wushu Championships where he placed seventh in both taijiquan and taijijian. A year later at the 2016 Asian Wushu Championships, he won the gold medal in taijiquan. At the 2017 World Wushu Championships, Hui won medals in taijiquan and taijijian. At the 2018 Asian Games, he finished in a four-way tie for second in taijiquan and a three-way tie for fourth in taijijian, thus ending in a fourth place ranking in the all-around taijiquan event. A year later at the 2019 World Wushu Championships, he became the world champion in men's taijijian.

In 2023 at the 2021 Summer World University Games, Hui won the gold medal in men's taijijian, the first gold medal for Hong Kong at the Games. He additionally won a bronze medal in taijiquan. Shortly after, he won the silver medal in men's taijiquan and taijijian combined at the 2022 Asian Games. Several months later, he won the gold medal in taijiquan doubles at the 2024 Asian Wushu Championships. A year later, he won the gold medal in taijijian at the 2025 Asian Taolu Cup.

== Competitive history ==
Year	Event	TJQ	TJJ	AA	QS	GRP
2015	World Championships	7	7			
2016	Asian Championships	1st place, gold medalist(s)	8			8
2016	World Cup	5	2nd place, silver medalist(s)			
2017	World Championships	2nd place, silver medalist(s)	3rd place, bronze medalist(s)			
2018	Asian Games	2	4	4		
2018	World Cup	2nd place, silver medalist(s)	2nd place, silver medalist(s)			
2019	World Championships	8	1st place, gold medalist(s)		8	( (bronze) )
2020	did not compete due to COVID-19 pandemic					
2023	World University Games	3rd place, bronze medalist(s)	1st place, gold medalist(s)			
2023	Asian Games	4	2	2nd place, silver medalist(s)		
2023	World Championships	14	15		DNS	
2024	Asian Championships	10	8			1st place, gold medalist(s)
