= Li Yi (wushu) =

Macau wushu practitioner

Li Yi SLM
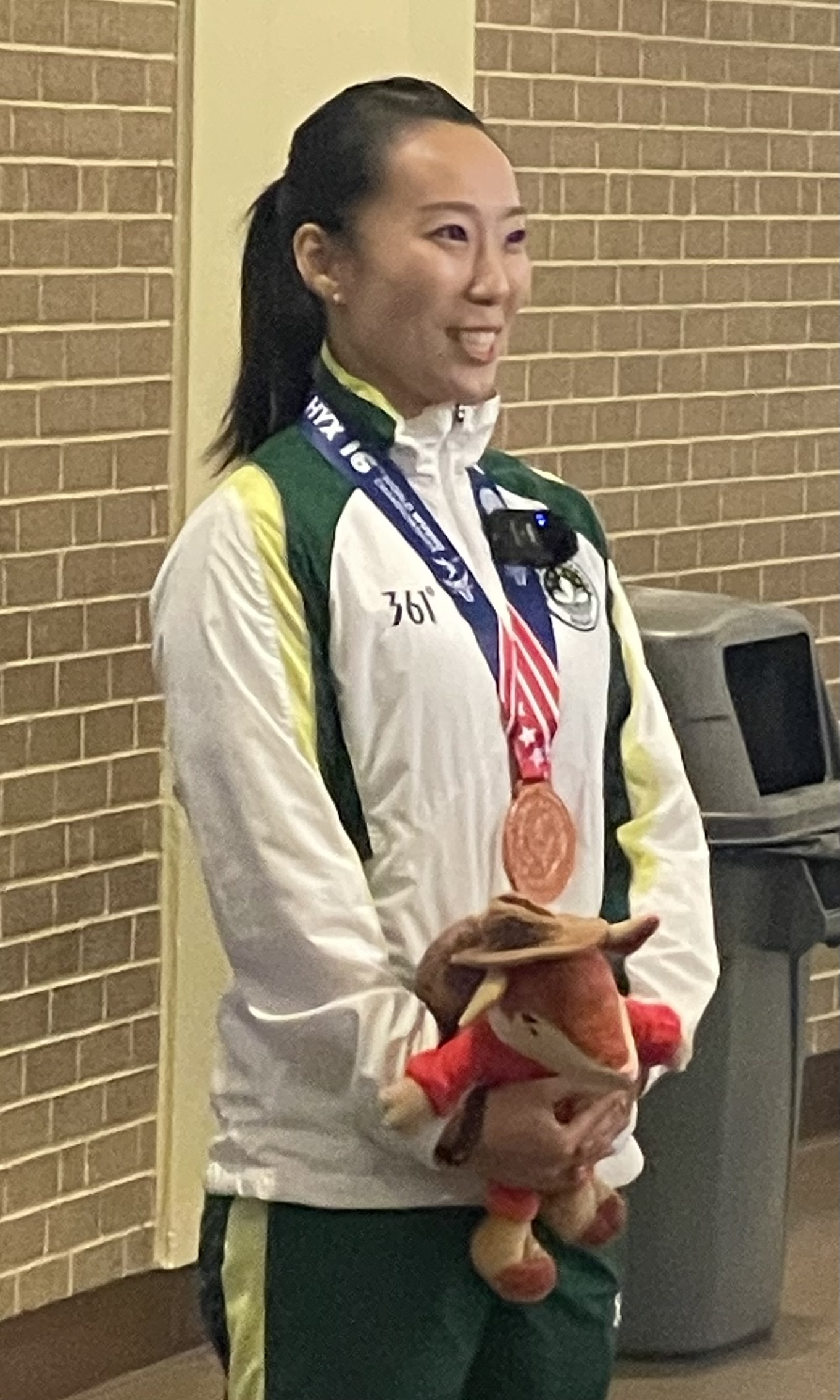
- Li Yi at the 2023 World Wushu Championships in Fort Worth, USA

Personal information
- Born: 1 January 1992 (age 34) Beijing, China
- Height: 1.61 m (5 ft 3 in)
- Weight: 54 kg (119 lb)

Sport
- Sport: Wushu
- Event(s): Changquan, Jianshu, Qiangshu
- Team: Macau Wushu Team
Medal record
Representing Macau
Women's Wushu Taolu
World Combat Games
Gold medal – first place	2023 Riyadh	Jianshu+Qiangshu
World Championships
Gold medal – first place	2019 Shanghai	Jianshu
Gold medal – first place	2019 Shanghai	Qiangshu
Gold medal – first place	2023 Fort Worth	Qiangshu
Silver medal – second place	2013 Kuala Lumpur	Duilian
Silver medal – second place	2019 Shanghai	Changquan
Bronze medal – third place	2017 Kazan	Changquan
Bronze medal – third place	2017 Kazan	Duilian
Bronze medal – third place	2023 Fort Worth	Jianshu
World Cup
Gold medal – first place	2016 Fuzhou	Jianshu
Gold medal – first place	2016 Fuzhou	Duilian
Silver medal – second place	2018 Yangon	Jianshu
Silver medal – second place	2018 Yangon	Duilian
Bronze medal – third place	2016 Fuzhou	Changquan
Bronze medal – third place	2016 Fuzhou	Qiangshu
Asian Games
Gold medal – first place	2022 Hangzhou	Changquan
Silver medal – second place	2014 Incheon	Jianshu+Qiangshu
Silver medal – second place	2018 Jakarta+Palembang	Changquan
Asian Championships
Gold medal – first place	2012 Hanoi	Qiangshu
Gold medal – first place	2016 Taoyuan	Jianshu
Silver medal – second place	2012 Hanoi	Chanquan
Silver medal – second place	2016 Taoyuan	Chanquan
Bronze medal – third place	2012 Hanoi	Jianshu
East Asian Games
Bronze medal – third place	2013 Tianjin	Duilian
Summer Universiade
Gold medal – first place	2017 Taipei	Changquan
Gold medal – first place	2017 Taipei	Jianshu

Li Yi SLM (Chinese: 李禕; pinyin: Lǐ yī; born 1 January 1992) is a retired professional wushu taolu athlete from Macau. She has achieved gold medals in the World Wushu Championships, Taolu World Cup, Asian Games, and the Asian Wushu Championships.

== Career ==
Li started practising wushu at the age of eight in Anhui.

Li's international debut was at the 2011 World Wushu Championships. A year later, she was a triple medalist at the Asian Wushu Championships. She then won a bronze medal at the 2013 East Asian Games and a silver medal 2013 World Wushu Championships in duilian. A year later, she competed in the 2014 Asian Games and won the silver medal in women's jianshu and qiangshu. At the 2015 World Wushu Championships, she qualified for the 2016 Taolu World Cup and went on to win a gold medal in jianshu and two bronze medals in changquan and qiangshu. In the 2017 World Wushu Championships, she earned another two bronze medals in changquan and duilian, and later at the 2017 Summer Universiade, she was a double gold medallist in changquan and jianshu, the first two and only two medals Macau has ever earned at the Universiade.

In 2018, Li returned to the Taolu World Cup and won two silver medals. Later that same year, she competed in the 2018 Asian Games and won the silver medal in women's changquan. In the 2019 World Wushu Championships, she won two gold medals in jianshu and qiangshu and a silver medal in changquan, making her one of the most successful athletes in the competition.

At the 2022 Asian Games, Li won the gold medal in women's changquan. Shortly after, she won the gold medal in jianshu and qiangshu combined at the 2023 World Combat Games. A few weeks later, she became the world champion in qiangshu and won a bronze medal in jianshu at the 2023 World Wushu Championships. She declared her retirement after the competition.

== Competitive History ==
Year	Event	CQ	JS	QS	AA	GRP
2011	World Championships	4	5	4		11
2012	Asian Championships	2nd place, silver medalist(s)	3rd place, bronze medalist(s)	1st place, gold medalist(s)		
2013	East Asian Games	5	6	3	5	3rd place, bronze medalist(s)
2013	World Championships	10	4	4		2nd place, silver medalist(s)
2014	Asian Games		2	1	2nd place, silver medalist(s)	
2015	World Championships	4	10	6		
2016	Asian Championships	2nd place, silver medalist(s)	1st place, gold medalist(s)	4		5
2016	World Cup	3rd place, bronze medalist(s)	1st place, gold medalist(s)	3rd place, bronze medalist(s)		1st place, gold medalist(s)
2017	World Championships	3rd place, bronze medalist(s)	4	9		3rd place, bronze medalist(s)
2017	World University Games	1st place, gold medalist(s)	1st place, gold medalist(s)			
2018	Asian Games	2nd place, silver medalist(s)				
2018	World Cup	4	2nd place, silver medalist(s)			2nd place, silver medalist(s)
2019	World Championships	2nd place, silver medalist(s)	1st place, gold medalist(s)	1st place, gold medalist(s)		4
2020	did not compete due to COVID-19 pandemic					
2023	Asian Games	1st place, gold medalist(s)				
2023	World Combat Games		2	1	1st place, gold medalist(s)	
2023	World Championships	4	3rd place, bronze medalist(s)	1st place, gold medalist(s)		

== Honours ==
Awarded by the Macau SAR Government

- Honourific Title of Merit: 2012, 2014
- Sports Merit Medal: 2018
- Silver Lotus Medal of Honour: 2023

Macau Outstanding Athletes Election

- Honorary Athletes Awards: Elected 2017, 2019

== See also ==
- List of Asian Games medalists in wushu
