= Wushu at the 2014 Asian Games – Women's jianshu & qiangshu =

Women's jianshu & qiangshu at the 2014 Asian Games
- Venue: Ganghwa Dolmens Gymnasium
- Dates: 21 September 2014
- Competitors: 8 from 8 nations

Medalists
gold medal	Dương Thúy Vi	Vietnam
silver medal	Li Yi	Macau
bronze medal	Seo Hee-ju	South Korea

The women's jianshu / qiangshu all-round competition at the 2014 Asian Games in Incheon, South Korea was held on 21 September at the Ganghwa Dolmens Gymnasium.

== Schedule ==
All times are Korea Standard Time (UTC+09:00)

Date	Time	Event
Sunday, 21 September 2014	09:00	Jianshu
Sunday, 21 September 2014	14:00	Qiangshu

== Results ==
Rank	Athlete	Jianshu	Qiangshu	Total
1st place, gold medalist(s)	Dương Thúy Vi (VIE)	9.71	9.70	19.41
2nd place, silver medalist(s)	Li Yi (MAC)	9.69	9.70	19.39
3rd place, bronze medalist(s)	Seo Hee-ju (KOR)	9.61	9.63	19.24
4	Fung Wing See (HKG)	9.62	9.53	19.15
5	Phoon Eyin (MAS)	9.58	9.56	19.14
6	Keiko Yamaguchi (JPN)	9.51	9.52	19.03
7	Lee Wen-jung (TPE)	9.35	9.34	18.69
8	Oshin Rai (NEP)	7.80	7.58	15.38
