= Wong Weng Son =

Malaysian wushu practitioner

Vincent Wong
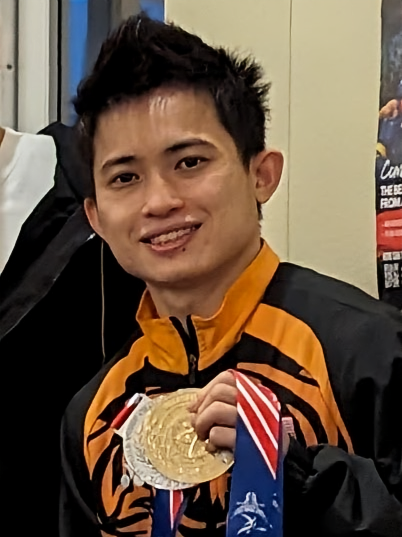
- Wong at the 2023 World Wushu Championships in Fort Worth, USA

Personal information
- Born: September 10, 1992 (age 33) Seremban, Malaysia
- Height: 1.58 m (5 ft 2 in)
- Weight: 53 kg (117 lb)

Sport
- Sport: Wushu
- Events: Changquan, Jianshu, Qiangshu
- Team: Malaysia Wushu Team
- Coached by: Koo Chee Zhong
Medal record
Representing Malaysia
Men's Wushu Taolu
World Championships
Gold medal – first place	2017 Kazan	Jianshu
Gold medal – first place	2023 Fort Worth	Changquan
Silver medal – second place	2015 Jakarta	Changquan (compulsory)
Silver medal – second place	2015 Jakarta	Qiangshu
Silver medal – second place	2017 Kazan	Qiangshu
Silver medal – second place	2019 Shanghai	Changquan
Silver medal – second place	2019 Shanghai	Jianshu
Silver medal – second place	2019 Shanghai	Qiangshu
Silver medal – second place	2023 Fort Worth	Jianshu
Silver medal – second place	2023 Fort Worth	Qiangshu
Bronze medal – third place	2015 Jakarta	Jianshu
World Cup
Gold medal – first place	2016 Fuzhou	Jianshu
Gold medal – first place	2018 Yangon	Jianshu
Gold medal – first place	2018 Yangon	Qiangshu
Gold medal – first place	2024 Yokohama	Jianshu
Bronze medal – third place	2016 Fuzhou	Qiangshu
Bronze medal – third place	2024 Yokohama	Changquan
Asian Championships
Gold medal – first place	2016 Taoyuan	Jianshu
Southeast Asian Games
Silver medal – second place	2013 Nay Pyi Taw	Duilian
Silver medal – second place	2017 Kuala Lumpur	Jianshu
Silver medal – second place	2017 Kuala Lumpur	Qiangshu
Silver medal – second place	2019 Philippines	Changquan
Silver medal – second place	2023 Phnom Penh	Jianshu+Qiangshu
Bronze medal – third place	2023 Phnom Penh	Changquan
Islamic Solidarity Games
Gold medal – first place	2013 Palembang	Changquan
Gold medal – first place	2013 Palembang	Jianshu+Qiangshu

Wong Weng Son, also known as Vincent Wong (Chinese: 黄永升; pinyin: Huángyǒngshēng; born September 10, 1992) is a retired wushu taolu athlete from Malaysia. He is one of Malaysia's most renowned wushu athletes of all time and is a two-time world champion.

== Career ==
=== Early career ===
Wong began practicing wushu at the age of ten when his father took him to wushu classes. Wong's father is also a lion dancer and so Wong practiced it before pursuing wushu more seriously.

=== Competitive career: 2013-24 ===
Wong's international debut was at the 2013 Southeast Asian Games in Nay Pyi Taw, Myanmar, where he won a silver medal in men's duilian. Two years later, he competed at the 2015 World Wushu Championships in Jakarta, Indonesia, where he was a triple medalist. A year later, Wong was finally able to win his first gold medal in international competition, doing so at the 1st Taolu World Cup in Fuzhou, China, in jianshu. Shortly after, he won the gold medal in jianshu at the Asian Wushu Championships.

At the 2017 World Wushu Championships, Wong became the world champion in jianshu and also won a silver medal in qiangshu. Despite being medal-less at the 2018 Asian Games where he competed in the men's changquan event, he was able to win, later that year, two gold medals in jianshu and qiangshu at the 2nd Taolu World Cup in Yangon, Myanmar.

In 2019, Wong became one of the few triple medalists at the 2019 World Wushu Championships in Shanghai, China, winning three silver medals in his specializations. A few weeks later at the 2019 Southeast Asian Games, Wong earned the silver medal men's changquan, missing the gold medal by 0.04 points.

After the start of the COVID-19 pandemic, Wong's first competition was the 2021 SEA Games (hosted in 2022) where he did not place in changquan. A year later at the 2023 SEA Games, he won the bronze medal in changquan and the silver medal in jianshu and qiangshu combined. He then competed in the 2022 Asian Games in men's changquan but did not place. A few months later, Wong competed in the 2023 World Wushu Championships and won the gold medal in changquan as well as silver medals in jianshu and qiangshu, becoming one of three triple medalists at the competition and winning his second world title. His last competition was at the 2024 Taolu World Cup where he won a gold medal in jianshu and a bronze medal in changquan. He declared his retirement after this competition.

== Competitive history ==
Year	Event	CQ	JS	QS	AA	GRP
2013	Southeast Asian Games	9		2nd place, silver medalist(s)		
2015	World Championships	2nd place, silver medalist(s)	2nd place, silver medalist(s)	3rd place, bronze medalist(s)		
2016	World Cup		1st place, gold medalist(s)	3rd place, bronze medalist(s)		
2016	Asian Championships	8	1st place, gold medalist(s)	8		4
2017	Southeast Asian Games	4	2nd place, silver medalist(s)	2nd place, silver medalist(s)		
2017	World Championships	12	1st place, gold medalist(s)	2nd place, silver medalist(s)		
2018	World Cup		1st place, gold medalist(s)	1st place, gold medalist(s)		
2018	Asian Games	9				
2019	World Championships	2nd place, silver medalist(s)	2nd place, silver medalist(s)	2nd place, silver medalist(s)		
2019	Southeast Asian Games	2nd place, silver medalist(s)				5
2020	did not compete due to COVID-19 pandemic					
2021	did not compete due to COVID-19 pandemic					
2022	Southeast Asian Games	?				
2023	Southeast Asian Games	3rd place, bronze medalist(s)	?	?	2nd place, silver medalist(s)	
2023	Asian Games	13				
2023	World Combat Games	4				
2023	World Championships	1st place, gold medalist(s)	2nd place, silver medalist(s)	2nd place, silver medalist(s)		
2024	World Cup	3rd place, bronze medalist(s)	1st place, gold medalist(s)			
