= Orders, decorations, and medals of Macau =

The government of Macau confers honors every year in the form of decorations, medals and honorary titles.

== Categories ==
The decorations, medals and honorary titles awarded by the government of the Macau Special Administrative Region of China can be divided into medals of honour, medals of merit, distinguished service medals, and honorary titles.

=== Medals of honor ===
Grand Lotus (大蓮花榮譽勳章; Medalhas de honra de Grande Lótus), the highest award under the MSAR honors and awards system, recognizes lifelong and highly significant contributions to the wellbeing of Macau.

The first two persons given this honor in 2001 were:

- Ma Man-kei (1919–2014) – late business tycoon, former chairman of the Macau Chamber of Commerce, former member of the Legislative Assembly of Macau, former vice-chairman of Chinese People's Political Consultative Conference.
- Tong Seng Chiu, former president of the Macao Federation of Workers' Union

Golden Lotus (金蓮花榮譽勳章; Medalhas de honra de Lótus de Ouro) is awarded for distinguished services to the community or who have rendered public or voluntary services of high merit.

The first three persons given this honor in 2001 were:

- Stanley Ho – business tycoon and casino owner
- Chui Tak Kei – entrepreneur, social activist and philanthropist; late uncle of Macau Chief Executive Fernando Chui
- Lao Kuong Po – community activist, dentist and founding chairman of the Macau General Union of the Neighborhood Associations

Silver Lotus (銀蓮花榮譽勳章; Medalhas de honra de Lótus de Prata) is awarded for leadership in public affairs and/or voluntary work over a long period.

The first three persons given this honor in 2001 were:

- Roque Choi (1921–2006) – late businessman and founder of Seng Heng Bank, former vice-president of the Commercial Association of Macau, former president of the Leal Senado, member of the Macau Legislative Assembly, member of the Chinese People's Political Consultative Conference
- Liang Pi Yun (1907–) – social activist, educationalist, journalist, poet and calligrapher

=== Medals of merit ===
There are seven types of medal of merit awarded by Macau:

- Professions (專業功績勳章; Medalha de mérito profissional)
- Industry and Commerce (工商功績勳章; Medalha de mérito industrial e comercial)
- Tourism (旅遊功績勳章; Medalha de mérito turístico)
- Education (教育功績勳章; Medalha de mérito educativo)
- Culture (文化功績勳章; Medalha de mérito cultural)
- Philanthropy (仁愛功績勳章; Medalha de mérito altruístico)
- Sports (體育功績勳章; Medalha de mérito desportivo)

=== Distinguished service medals ===
- Medal for Bravery (英勇獎章; Medalha de valor)
- Medal for Dedication (勞績獎章; Medalha de dedicação)
- Medal for Community Service (社會服務獎章; Medalha de serviços comunitários)

=== Honorary titles ===
- Honourific Title of Prestige (榮譽獎狀; Título honorífico de prestígio)
- Honourific Title of Merit (功績獎狀; Título honorífico de valor)

== Colonial orders, decorations and medals (pre-1999) ==
Prior to handover of Macau in 1999, the Portuguese honors system was in use.

Military decorations were awarded to Portuguese military personnel serving in Macau only:

- Armed Forces Expeditions Commemorative Medal and Armed Forces Special Service Commissions Commemorative Medal – Macau

Civilian and Civil awards given by the Macau Government:

- Medal of Professional Merit (Government of Macau)
- Medal of Value (Government of Macau)
- Medal of Cultural Merit (Government of Macau)

Portuguese orders given to Portuguese and Macanese in Macau:

- Order of Aviz (Ordem Militar de Aviz)
  - Grand Cross (GCA)
  - Grand Officer (GOA)
  - Commander (ComA)
  - Officer (OA)
  - Knight (CavA) or Dame (DamA)
- St George's Cross (1st Class)
- Order of Christ (Ordem Militar de Christo)
  - Grand Cross (GCC)
  - Grand Officer (GOC)
  - Commander (ComC)
  - Knight (CavC) or Dame (DamC)
- Order of Prince Henry (Ordem do Infante Dom Henrique)
  - Grand Collar (Grande Colar – GColIH)
  - Grand Cross (Grã-Cruz – GCIH)
  - Grand Officer (Grande-Oficial – GOIH)
  - Commander (Comendador – ComIH)
  - Officer (Oficial – OIH)
  - Knight / Dame (Cavaleiro / Dama – CavIH / DamIH)
  - Silver Medal (Medalha de Prata – MedPIH) and a Gold Medal (Medalha de Ouro – MedOIH)
- Order of the Tower and Sword (Ordem Militar da Torre e Espada do Valor, Lealdade e Mérito)
  - Grand Collar (GColTE)
  - Grand Cross (GCTE)
  - Grand Officer (GOTE)
  - Commander (ComTE)
  - Officer (OTE)
  - Knight (CavTE) or Dame (DamTE)
