= Tomoya Okawa =

Japanese wushu practitioner

Personal information
- Born: January 3, 1993 (age 33) Ebetsu, Hokkaido, Japan

Sport
- Sport: Wushu
- Event(s): Changquan, Jianshu, Qiangshu
- Team: Japan Wushu Team
Medal record
Representing Japan
Men's Wushu Taolu
World Championships
Gold medal – first place	2013 Kuala Lumpur	Jianshu
Silver medal – second place	2013 Kuala Lumpur	Qiangshu
Bronze medal – third place	2015 Jakarta	Qiangshu
World Cup
Gold medal – first place	2016 Fuzhou	Qiangshu
Silver medal – second place	2018 Yangon	Jianshu
Silver medal – second place	2018 Yangon	Qiangshu
Bronze medal – third place	2016 Fuzhou	Jianshu
Asian Championships
Silver medal – second place	2016 Taoyuan	Jianshu

Tomoya Okawa (Japanese: 大川智矢; born January 3, 1993) is a wushu taolu athlete from Japan. He is a one-time world champion, and multiple-time medalist at the World Wushu Championships and the Taolu World Cup.

== Career ==
Okawa started training wushu at the age of ten. He originally just practiced taijiquan, but eventually switched to modern changquan and later to jianshu and qiangshu in 2012. Okawa's international debut was at the 2013 World Wushu Championships in Kuala Lumpur, Malaysia, where he became the world champion in men's jianshu. He also won a silver medal in qiangshu. Two years later, Okawa competed in the 2015 World Wushu Championships and won a bronze medal in qiangshu. His high placements in changquan and jianshu qualified him to compete in three events at the 2016 Taolu World Cup in Fuzhou, China, where he won a gold medal in qiangshu and a silver medal in jianshu. That same year, he also won a silver medal in jianshu at the Asian Wushu Championships in Taoyuan, Chinese Taipei. A year later, Tomoya suffered a major ACL injury during training, but was able to compete and place high in the 2017 World Wushu Championships. He then went on to win silver medals in jianshu and qiangshu at the 2018 Taolu World Cup in Yangon, Myanmar.
