= Huang Junhua =

Macau wushu practitioner

Huang Junhua SLM
Personal information
- Born: 29 December 1991 (age 34)
- Height: 1.61 m (5 ft 3 in)
- Weight: 46 kg (101 lb)

Sport
- Sport: Wushu
- Events: Nanquan, Nandao, Nangun
- Team: Macau Wushu Team
Medal record
Men's Wushu Taolu
Representing Macau
World Championships
| Gold medal – first place | 2015 Jakarta | Nangun |
| Gold medal – first place | 2017 Kazan | Nandao |
| Silver medal – second place | 2013 Kuala Lumpur | Nandao |
| Silver medal – second place | 2015 Jakarta | Nanquan |
| Silver medal – second place | 2017 Kazan | Nanquan |
| Silver medal – second place | 2019 Shanghai | Nangun |
| Silver medal – second place | 2023 Fort Worth | Nanquan |
| Silver medal – second place | 2023 Fort Worth | Nandao |
| Bronze medal – third place | 2019 Shanghai | Nanquan |
World Cup
| Gold medal – first place | 2018 Yangon | Nandao |
| Silver medal – second place | 2016 Fuzhou | Nangun |
| Bronze medal – third place | 2018 Yangon | Nangun |
| Bronze medal – third place | 2024 Yokohama | Nanquan |
Asian Games
| Gold medal – first place | 2018 Jakarta-Palembang | Nanquan+Nangun |
| Silver medal – second place | 2014 Incheon | Nanquan+Nangun |
| Bronze medal – third place | 2022 Hangzhou | Nanquan+Nangun |
Asian Championships
| Bronze medal – third place | 2012 Ho Chi Minh City | Nanquan |
| Bronze medal – third place | 2016 Taoyuan | Nanquan |
| Bronze medal – third place | 2016 Taoyuan | Nandao |
| Bronze medal – third place | 2024 Macau | Nandao |
| Bronze medal – third place | 2024 Macau | Nangun |
East Asian Games
| Bronze medal – third place | 2013 Tianjin | Nanquan |
| Bronze medal – third place | 2013 Tianjin | Duilian |

Huang Junhua SLM (Chinese: 黄俊华; pinyin: Huángjùnhuá; born 29 December 1991) is a professional wushu taolu athlete from Macau. He is a two-time world champion and the second ever gold medallist for Macau at the Asian Games.

== Career ==
Huang made his international debut at the 2012 Asian Wushu Championships where he won a bronze medal in nanquan. He then competed in the 2013 East Asian Games and won bronze medals in nanquan and duilian. He also competed in the 2013 World Wushu Championships the same year where he claimed a silver medal in nandao. A year later, Huang competed in the 2014 Asian Games and won the silver medal men's nanquan. Another year later, he competed in the 2015 World Wushu Championships in Jakarta, Indonesia, where he became the world champion in nangun and additionally won a silver medal in nanquan. He then won two bronze medals in the 2016 Asian Wushu Championships in nanquan and nandao. Following this, he competed in the 2017 World Wushu Championships in Kazan, Russia, where he was a world champion in nandao and also a silver medalist in nanquan.

A year later, Huang claimed a historical gold medal for Macau at the 2018 Asian Games in the men's nanquan event, which was the second ever gold medal for Macau at the Asian Games. His high placements at the 207 world championships helped him qualify for the 2018 Taolu World Cup where he won a gold and bronze medal in nandao and nangun respectively. His most recent appearance was at the 2019 World Wushu Championships in Shanghai, China, where he won a silver medal in nangun and a bronze medal in nanquan.

After the start of the COVID-19 pandemic, Huang's first major competition was the 2022 Asian Games where he won the bronze medal in men's nanquan. A few months later, he won silver medals in nanquan and nandao at the 2023 World Wushu Championships. Several months later, he won bronze medals in nandao and nangun at the 2024 Asian Wushu Championships. He then won a bronze medal in nanquan at the 2024 Taolu World Cup.

== Honours ==
Awarded by the Macau SAR Government:

- Silver Lotus Medal of Honour (2018)
- Honourific Title of Merit (2023)

Macau Outstanding Athletes Election

- Honorary Athletes Awards (2015, 2017)

== See also ==
- List of Asian Games medalists in wushu
