= Lee Yong-hyun =

Korean wushu practitioner

Personal information
- Born: 11 November 1993 (age 32)
- Height: 1.70 m (5 ft 7 in)

Sport
- Sport: Wushu
- Events: Changquan, Daoshu, Gunshu
- Team: Korean Wushu Team
Medal record
Men's Wushu Taolu
Representing South Korea
World Championships
Gold medal – first place	2017 Kazan	Gunshu
Silver medal – second place	2017 Kazan	Duilian
Silver medal – second place	2025 Brasília	Changquan
Bronze medal – third place	2015 Jakarta	Changquan
World Cup
Silver medal – second place	2024 Yokohama	Gunshu
Bronze medal – third place	2018 Yangon	Gunshu
Bronze medal – third place	2026 Haikou	Changquan
Asian Games
Silver medal – second place	2014 Incheon	Daoshu+Gunshu
Asian Championships
Gold medal – first place	2024 Macau	Gunshu
Asian Cup
Bronze medal – third place	2025 Songyuan	Changquan

Lee Yong-hyun (Korean: 용현; RR: yonghyeon, born 11 November 1993) is a Wushu taolu athlete from South Korea.

== Career ==
Lee made his international debut at the 2014 Asian Games where he won the silver medal in men's daoshu and gunshu. He then competed in the 2015 World Wushu Championships where he won a bronze medal in changquan. His last competition was at the 2017 World Wushu Championships where he was the world champion in gunshu and a silver medalist in duilian with Lee Yong-mun and Lee Ha-sung.

After the start of the COVID-19 pandemic, Lee's first major international competition was the 2022 Asian Games (hosted in 2023) where he competed in the men's daoshu and gunshu combined event but did not place. He then competed at the 2023 World Wushu Championships and placed fifth in gunshu. Several months later, he became the Asian champion in gunshu at the 2024 Asian Wushu Championships. He then won a silver medal in gunshu at the 2024 Taolu World Cup. A year later, he won a bronze medal in changquan at the 2025 Taolu Asian Cup. This was followed by a silver medal in changquan at the 2025 World Wushu Championships, and then a bronze medal in the same event at the 2026 Taolu World Cup.

== Personal life ==
His brother, Lee Yong-mun, is also a highly skilled wushu athlete.

== See also ==
- List of Asian Games medalists in wushu
