= Wushu at the 2014 Asian Games – Men's nanquan & nangun =

Men's nanquan & nangun at the 2014 Asian Games
- Venue: Ganghwa Dolmens Gymnasium
- Dates: 22 September 2014
- Competitors: 16 from 15 nations

Medalists
gold medal	Wang Di	China
silver medal	Huang Junhua	Macau
bronze medal	Hsu Kai-kuei	Chinese Taipei

The men's Nanquan / Nangun all-round competition at the 2014 Asian Games in Incheon, South Korea was held on 22 September at the Ganghwa Dolmens Gymnasium.

== Schedule ==
All times are Korea Standard Time (UTC+09:00)

Date	Time	Event
Monday, 22 September 2014	09:00	Nanquan
Monday, 22 September 2014	14:00	Nangun

== Results ==
Rank	Athlete	Nanquan	Nangun	Total
1st place, gold medalist(s)	Wang Di (CHN)	9.77	9.78	19.55
2nd place, silver medalist(s)	Huang Junhua (MAC)	9.66	9.64	19.30
3rd place, bronze medalist(s)	Hsu Kai-kuei (TPE)	9.64	9.65	19.29
4	Phạm Quốc Khánh (VIE)	9.65	9.63	19.28
5	Wai Phyo Aung (MYA)	9.63	9.63	19.26
6	Lee Yong-mun (KOR)	9.63	9.62	19.25
7	Ho Mun Hua (MAS)	9.62	9.62	19.24
8	Farshad Arabi (IRI)	9.53	9.63	19.16
9	Koki Nakata (JPN)	9.06	9.50	18.56
10	Sunny Shrestha (NEP)	8.83	8.95	17.78
11	Sajan Lama (IND)	9.06	7.95	17.01
12	Amir Hossain (BAN)	7.94	8.29	16.23
13	Khaled Kassim (KUW)	8.30	7.72	16.02
14	Elbek Rakhimov (UZB)	7.70	8.28	15.98
15	Bekhzod Ergashev (UZB)	8.01	7.71	15.72
16	Mirzodalerkhon Khurshedzoda (TJK)	6.60	6.92	13.52
