= Wushu at the 2022 Asian Games – Women's taijiquan & taijijian =

Women's taijiquan & taijijian at the 2022 Asian Games
- Venue: Xiaoshan Guali Sports Centre
- Dates: 24 September 2023
- Competitors: 15 from 12 nations

Medalists
gold medal	Tong Xin	China
silver medal	Basma Lachkar	Brunei
bronze medal	Chen Suijin	Hong Kong

The women's taijiquan and taijijian competition at the 2022 Asian Games was held on 24 September 2023 at the Xiaoshan Guali Sports Centre in Hangzhou, China.

== Schedule ==
All times are China Standard Time (UTC+08:00)

Date	Time	Event
Sunday, 24 September 2023	09:00	Taijiquan
Sunday, 24 September 2023	14:30	Taijijian

== Results ==
Legend

- DNS — Did not start

Rank	Athlete	Taijiquan	Taijijian	Total
1st place, gold medalist(s)	Tong Xin (CHN)	9.843	9.853	19.696
2nd place, silver medalist(s)	Basma Lachkar (BRU)	9.746	9.756	19.502
3rd place, bronze medalist(s)	Chen Suijin (HKG)	9.746	9.730	19.476
4	Sydney Chin (MAS)	9.730	9.730	19.460
5	Agatha Wong (PHI)	9.720	9.736	19.456
6	Shiho Saito (JPN)	9.730	9.710	19.440
7	Juanita Mok (HKG)	9.633	9.730	19.363
8	Vera Tan (SGP)	9.703	9.620	19.323
9	Zeanne Law (SGP)	9.746	9.553	19.299
10	Lim Yee Sean (BRU)	9.436	9.060	18.496
11	Trần Thị Kiều Trang (VIE)	9.476	8.983	18.459
12	Myat Noe Eain (MYA)	9.360	9.010	18.370
13	Liu Pei-hsun (TPE)	8.940	8.946	17.886
14	Sabita Rai (NEP)	8.623	8.796	17.419
—	Mepung Lamgu (IND)	DNS	DNS	DNS
