= Macau Outstanding Athletes Election =

Macau Outstanding Athletes Election Eleição dos Atletas Excepcionais de Macau 澳門傑出運動員選舉
- Country: China
- Presented by: Macau
- First award: 2007

The Macau Outstanding Athletes Election (Portuguese: Eleição dos Atletas Excepcionais de Macau; Chinese: 澳門傑出運動員選舉; pinyin: Àomén jiéchū yùndòngyuán xuǎnjǔ) is organized by the Macau Institute of Sport and by Macau Sports Weekly to award athletes who have contributed to the success or development of Macau in sport. 80% of the vote is made by the institute committee and 20% is made by the general public. The election is held every two years.

== Recipients ==
=== Honorary awards for athletes ===
Years	Winners	Sports	Notes
2007	Domingos Chan	Football	
2007	Han Jing	Wushu	
2007	Jia Rui	Wushu	
2007	Huang Yanhui	Wushu	
2007	Wang Weng Cheong	Swimming	
2007	Kuan Sok Mui	Artistic cycling	
2007	Cheong Pui Si	Karate	
2007	Paula Cristina Pereira Carion	Karate	
2007	Hoi Long	Triathlon	
2007	Too Chuen Kei	Volleyball	
2009	Hoi Long	Triathlon	2nd election
2009	Geofredo Cheung	Football	
2009	Wong Soi Cheong	Fencing	
2009	Leong Kin Wa	Table tennis	
2009	Jia Rui	Wushu	2nd election
2009	Leong Kin Hong	Swimming	
2009	António Tong	Athletics	
2009	Chong Ka Lap	Bodybuilding	
2009	Mak Ka Lei	Badminton	
2009	Wong Sio Chao	Boxing	
2011	Jia Rui	Wushu	3rd election
2011	Chu Chi Wai	Wushu	
2011	Cai Liangchan	Wushu	
2011	Choi Sut Ian	Diving	
2011	Hoi Long	Triathlon	3rd election
2011	Wong Hang Cheong	Artistic cycling	
2011	Wong Weng Man	Auto racing	
2011	Zhang Shaoling	Olympic weightlifting	
2011	Fung Chi Ip	Special Olympics	
2011	Leong Ka Hang	Football	
2013	Jia Rui	Wushu	4th election
2013	Chu Chi Wai	Wushu	2nd election
2013	Iao Chon In	Wushu	
2013	Cai Ao Long	Wushu	
2013	Hoi Long	Triathlon	4th election
2013	Kuok Kin Hang	Karate	
2013	Cheong Pui Si	Karate	2nd election
2013	Lei On Kei	Swimming	
2013	Choi Sut Ian	Diving	2nd election
2013	Lee Tak Man	Bowling	
2015	Iong Kim Fai	Athletics	
2015	Chao Man Hou	Swimming	3rd election
2015	Leong On Ieng	Volleyball	
2015	Hoi Long	Triathlon	5th election
2015	Choi Sut Ian	Diving	3rd election
2015	Li Yi	Wushu	
2015	Huang Junhua	Wushu	
2015	Iao Chon In	Wushu	2nd election
2015	Paula Cristina Pereira Carion	Karate	2nd election
2015	Iao Chong Wa	Bodybuilding	
2017	Hoi Long	Triathlon	6th election
2017	Chao Man Hou	Swimming	4th election
2017	Lei On Kei	Swimming	
2017	Lao Long San	Cycle sport	
2017	Lou Wai Kit	Karate	
2017	Pang Chi Hang	Football	
2017	Lai Ka Tong	Basketball	
2017	Li Yi	Wushu	
2017	Huang Junhua	Wushu	
2017	Chio Wai Keong	Wushu	

=== Honorary awards for junior athletes ===
Year	Winners	Sports	Notes
2007	Ho Si Heng	Wushu	
2007	Lei Hok Hin	Bowling	
2007	Ao Ieong Sin Ieng	Synchronized swimming	
2007	Lok Ka Chon	Triathlon	
2007	Tong Hou Tong	Swimming	
2007	Ieong Hou Un	Judo	
2007	Lam Chi Man	Badminton	
2007	Lao Chi Hong	Table tennis	
2007	Kuan Yu Sam	Figure skating	
2007	Cheong Im Wa	Athletics	
2009	Lei On Kei	Swimming	
2009	Ho Si Hang	Wushu	
2009	Chu Chi Wai	Wushu	
2009	U Mei Kok	Dancesport	
2009	Fong Wai Kin	Dancesport	
2009	Hui Tong	Bowling	
2009	Lok Ka Long	Triathlon	
2009	Leong Ka Weng	Special Olympics	
2009	Chang Wing Chung	Kart racing	
2009	Ieong Hou Un	Judo	
2011	Wu Nok In	Wushu	
2011	Chio Wai Keong	Wushu	
2011	Vong Chi Ieng	Judo	
2011	Sou Chi Ngai	Special Olympics	
2011	Ngou Pok Man	Swimming	
2011	Chao Man Hou	Swimming	
2011	Pun Wun	Dancesport	
2011	Lam Chi Tong	Dancesport	
2011	Ho Man Fai	Association football	
2011	Chang Wing Chung	Kart racing	2nd election
2013	Sou Cho Man	Wushu	
2013	Chio Wai Keong	Wushu	2nd election
2013	Chong Ka Seng	Wushu	
2013	Lei Hoi Tan	Wushu	
2013	Chao Man Hou	Swimming	2nd election
2013	Chen Yu Chia	Special Olympics	
2013	Chang Wing Chung	Kart racing	3rd election
2013	Ho Peng I	Fencing	
2013	Yang Zi Xian	Athletics	
2013	Ng Si Cheng	Canoeing	
2015	Chong Ka Seng	Wushu	2nd election
2015	Wong Kui Sin	Wushu	
2015	Wu Chi In	Wushu	
2015	Loi Im Lan	Athletics	
2015	Lam Cho Kei	Athletics	
2015	Vong Erica Man Wai	Swimming	
2015	Lao Ka Cheng	Judo	
2015	Wan Chi Kit	Artistic cycling	
2015	Lam Chit Wai	Special Olympics	
2015	Lo Wai Fong	Special Olympics	
2017	Wong Kui Sin	Wushu	2nd election
2017	Wong Sam In	Wushu	
2017	Wong Chin Wa	Triathlon	
2017	Lei Cheng I	Judo	
2017	Wong Son Ian	Bowling	
2017	Ieong Chi Son	Cycle sport	
2017	Yeung Weng Chi	Squash	
2017	Leong Hon Chio	Auto racing	
2017	Lin Sizhuang	Swimming	
2017	Ho I Teng	Artistic cycling	

=== Honorary awards for teams of Macau ===
Year	Winners	Sports	Notes
2007	Dragon Boat Team	Dragon boat	
2007	Han Jing / Huan Yanhui	Wushu	
2007	Wong Heng Cheong / Lou Weng Ian	Artistic cycling	
2009	Dragon Dance and Lion Dance Teams	Dragon dance / Lion dance	
2009	Kuan Sok Muo / Kuan Sok In	Artistic cycling	
2009	Macau Synchronized Swimming Team	Synchronized swimming	
2011	Dragon Dance and Lion Dance Teams	Dragon dance / Lion dance	2nd election
2011	Wu Nok In / Van Ka Lok	Wushu	
2011	Macau Synchronized Swimming Team	Synchronized swimming	2nd election
2013	Macau Roller Hockey Team	Roller hockey	
2013	Winter Special Olympics Cross Country Team	Special Olympics	
2013	Kuan Sok Mui / Kuan Sok In	Artistic cycling	
2015	Dragon Dance and Lion Dance Teams	Dragon dance / Lion dance	3rd election
2015	Macau Synchronized Swimming Team	Synchronized swimming	3rd election
2015	Macau Triathlon Team	Triathlon	
2017	Lion Dance Team	Lion dance	4th election
2017	Macau National Football Team	Association football	
2017	Macau Triathlon Team	Triathlon	

=== Most popular athletes ===
Year	Medals	Winners	Sports	Notes
2011	Gold	Lei On Kei	Swimming	
2011	Silver	U Mei Kok	Dancesport	
2011	Bronze	Jia Rui	Wushu	
2013	Gold	Pun Wun	Dancesport	
2013	Silver	Fong Wai Kin	Dancesport	
2013	Bronze	Lei On Kei	Swimming	
2015	Gold	Lei On Kei	Swimming	
2015	Silver	Pun Wun	Dancesport	
2015	Bronze	Fong Wai Kin	Dancesport	
2017	Gold	Lei On Kei	Swimming	
2017	Silver	Wong Weng Lam and Tam Ka Pan	Dancesport	
2017	Bronze			

=== Most popular junior athletes ===
Year	Medals	Winners	Sports	Notes
2011	Gold	Ngou Pok Man	Swimming	
2011	Silver	Pun Wun	Dancesport	
2011	Bronze	Leong Ka Fai	Handball	
2013	Gold	Vong Weng Lam	Dancesport	
2013	Silver	Jin Heng	Dancesport	
2013	Bronze	Tam Ka Pan	Dancesport	
2015	Gold	Law Weng Sam	Volleyball	
2015	Silver	Lai Keng Pui	Dancesport	
2015	Bronze	Che Tin Long	Dancesport	
2017	Gold	Cheung Ioi Chit	Wushu	
2017	Silver	Han Soi Wa	Wushu	
2017	Bronze	Wong Chin Wa	Triathlon	

=== Honorary awards for coaches ===
Year	Medals	Winners	Sports	Notes
2011	Gold	Zeng Tie Ming	Wushu	
2011	Gold	Ren Yanbing	Wushu	
2011	Gold	Pun Keng Man	Lion dance / Dragon dance	
2011	Gold	Mohammadreza Rashidnia	Karate	
2011	Gold	Han Weifeng	Dragon boat	
2011	Gold	Zhang Zilin	Diving	
2011	Gold	Yiu Man Yau	Bowling	
2011	Gold	Chong Ka Lap	Bodybuilding	
2011	Gold	Leong Kin Hong	Synchronized swimming	
2011	Gold	Lam Kam Hung	Auto racing	
2011	Gold	Lou Weng Meng	Auto racing	
2011	Gold	Kenta Ando	Triathlon	
2011	Silver	Yu Lihui	Badminton	
2011	Silver	Kong Rui	Synchronized swimming	
2011	Silver	He Ya	Synchronized swimming	
2011	Silver	Lei Fu Sim	Swimming	
2011	Silver	Siu Yu Ning	Special Olympics	
2011	Silver	Wong Io Meng	Special Olympics	
2011	Silver	Choi Lai Fong	Dancesport	
2011	Bronze	Ng Wan Long	Association football	
2011	Bronze	Zheng Ruoxu	Swimming	
2011	Bronze	Ying Jingli	Swimming	
2011	Honourable Mention	Li Li Ping	Artistic roller skating	
2011	Honourable Mention	Sam Wai Hong	Fencing	
2011	Honourable Mention	Lam Chi Meng	Special Olympics	
2011	Honourable Mention	Au Chi Kun	Athletics	
2011	Honourable Mention	Leung Chi Wa	Chess	
2011	Honourable Mention	Hong Chon Im	Chess	
2011	Honourable Mention	U Sio Fan	Water polo	
2011	Honourable Mention	Cai Ai Dao	Softball	
2011	Honourable Mention	Zheng Jiachun	Diving	
2011	Honourable Mention	Wong Wai Fong (ou Vong Vai Fong)	Basketball	
2013	Gold	Zeng Tie Ming	Wushu	2nd election
2013	Gold	Mohammadreza Rashidnia	Karate	2nd election
2013	Gold	Ng Yat On (ou Wu Rian)	Karate	
2013	Silver	Asaaki Ishimine	Judo	
2013	Silver	Chang Choi Chan	Judo	
2013	Silver	Ying Jingli	Swimming	
2013	Silver	Kenta Ando	Triathlon	2nd election
2013	Silver	Yiu Man Yau	Bowling	
2013	Bronze	Wu Peng Koi	Special Olympics	
2013	Bronze	Alberto Lisboa	Roller hockey	
2013	Bronze	He Ya	Synchronized swimming	
2013	Bronze	Zhang Zilin	Diving	
2013	Bronze	Lam Kam Hung	Motorsport	
2013	Honourable Mention	Lou Weng Meng	Motorsport	
2013	Honourable Mention	Han Wei Feng	Dragon boat	
2013	Honourable Mention	Dong Xuezhi	Athletics	
2013	Honourable Mention	Yu Lihui	Badminton	
2013	Honourable Mention	Chong Ka Lok	Judo	
2013	Honourable Mention	Choi Lai Fong	Dancesport	
2013	Honourable Mention	Lei Chong Kai	Badminton	
2013	Honourable Mention	Po Man Lok	Badminton	
2013	Honourable Mention	Li Li Ping	Ice skating	
2013	Honourable Mention	Lo Chi Wai	Judo	
2013	Honourable Mention	Leong Chi Kin	Special Olympics	
2015	Gold	Zeng Tie Ming	Wushu	3rd election
2015	Gold	Pun Keng Man	Wushu	
2015	Gold	Mohammadreza Rashidnia	Wushu	3rd election
2015	Silver	Ng Yat On (ou Wu Rian)	Karate	2nd election
2015	Silver	Kuan Sok Mui	Artistic cycling	
2015	Silver	Lou Weng Meng	Artistic cycling	
2015	Silver	Ying Jing li	Swimming	
2015	Silver	Dong Xuezhi	Athletics	
2015	Bronze	Au Chi Kun	Athletics	
2015	Bronze	Emanuel Frederico Guerra	Judo	
2015	Bronze	Jiro Kase	Judo	
2015	Bronze	Leong Siu Pou	Judo	
2015	Bronze	Chong Ka Lok	Judo	
2015	Honourable Mention	Lo Chi Wai	Judo	
2015	Honourable Mention	Wong Kan Kao	Special Olympics	
2015	Honourable Mention	Iong Kit Man	Special Olympics	
2015	Honourable Mention	Huang Ruihua	Synchronized swimming	
2015	Honourable Mention	Zhang Zilin	Diving	
2015	Honourable Mention	He Ya	Diving	
2015	Honourable Mention	Kenta Ando	Triathlon	
2015	Honourable Mention	Yiu Man Yau	Bowling	
2015	Honourable Mention	Lin Yuan Xiang	Badminton	
2015	Honourable Mention	Li Li Ping	Ice skating	
2015	Honourable Mention	Aquino da Silva	Judo	
2015	Honourable Mention	Choi Lai Fong	Dancesport	
2017	Gold	Tsoi Chun Ming	Cycle sport	
2017	Gold	Iao Chon In	Wushu	
2017	Gold	Ying Jing Li	Swimming	
2017	Silver	Che Tin Iao	Cycle sport	
2017	Silver	Tam Iao San	Association football	
2017	Silver	Rashidnia Mohammadre	Karate	
2017	Silver	Zhang Zilin	Diving	
2017	Silver	Lim Chee Ming	Squash	
2017	Bronze	Choi Iek I	Lion dance / Dragon dance /wushu	
2017	Bronze	Law Chan Kuong	Lion dance / Dragon dance /wushu	
2017	Bronze	Qin Zhijian	Sanda	
2017	Bronze	Kuan Sok Mui	Artistic cycling	
2017	Bronze	Kenta Ando	Triathlon	
2017	Honourable Mention	Lou Weng Meng	Artistic cycling	
2017	Honourable Mention	Daniel Yiu	Bowling	
2017	Honourable Mention	Li Liping	Ice skating	
2017	Honourable Mention	Wang Ruihua	Synchronized swimming	
2017	Honourable Mention	Jiro Kase	Judo	
2017	Honourable Mention	Emanuel Frederico Guerra	Judo	
2017	Honourable Mention	Lau Fong Peng	Gymnastics	
2017	Honourable Mention	Qiu Yingping	Diving	
2017	Honourable Mention	Vong Vai Fong	Basketball	
2017	Honourable Mention	U Mei Kok	Dancesport	

=== Honorary praise award ===
Year	Winners	Sports	Notes
2017	Macau Basketball Team at the Universiade	Basketball	
2017	Macau Cycling Team	Cycle sport	
