= Sedigheh Daryaei =

Personal information
- Full name: Sedigheh Daryaei Verkadeh صدیقه دریایی ورکاده
- Nationality: Iran
- Born: 16 May 1991 (age 35) Amol, Mazandaran Province, Iran
- Height: 163 cm (5 ft 4 in)
- Weight: 65 kg (143 lb)

Sport
- Country: Iran
- Sport: Wushu
- Event: Sanda
Medal record
Representing Iran
Wushu
World Championships
Gold medal – first place	2015 Jakarta	60 kg
Gold medal – first place	2025 Brasília	65 kg
Asian Championships
Gold medal – first place	2012 Ho Chi Minh City	60 kg
Bronze medal – third place	2016 Taoyuan	60 kg

Sedigheh Daryaei (Persian: صدیقه دریایی; born May 16, 1991 in Amol) is an Iranian wushu athlete who competes in the sanda division. From the age of 21, she managed to pursue her career in the senior Asian Wushu Championships and won her first Asian gold medal in the senior age category this year. Before this important achievement, she was able to win a gold medal in 2009 in the Asian Youth Championship in Macau. Two world championship medals are also visible in the career of Sedigheh Daryaei. She is also a member of Sepahan Club in the Iranian Wushu League and has a history of winning in these competitions.

== Fringe and controversy ==
Daryaei, who participated as a coach in the Iranian women's national wushu team selection tournament, was involved in a strange conflict between Shahrbanoo Mansourian and the family of one of the participants in this course, and was banned from participating in the tournament for three months by the wushu disciplinary committee.

== Honors ==
- Gold medal of the 2009 Asian Youth Championship - Macau
- Gold medal of the 2012 Asian Wushu Championships - Vietnam
- Gold medal of the 2015 World Championship Seniors - Indonesia
- Gold medal of the 2016 World Championship - China
- Bronze medal of the 2016 Asian Wushu Championships - Taiwan
