= Tan Xiang Tian =

Singaporean martial artist

Tan Xiang Tian (born 1992), is a Singaporean martial artist. In 2015, Tan became Singapore third world wushu champion after winning xingyiquan at the 2015 World Wushu Championships in Jakarta, Indonesia.

== Early life ==
Tan was educated at Victoria School and later studied psychology at James Cook University.

== Other Awards ==
Tan won the Singapore National Olympic Council Meritious Award in 2016.

== See also ==
- List of Singapore world champions in sports
