= 2013 World Wushu Championships =

12th edition of the World Wushu Championships

- Venue: Kuala Lumpur Badminton Stadium (capacity: 4,500)
- Location: Kuala Lumpur, Malaysia
- Start date: November 1, 2013
- End date: November 5, 2013

The 2013 World Wushu Championships was the 12th edition of the World Wushu Championships. It was held at the Kuala Lumpur Badminton Stadium in Kuala Lumpur, Malaysia from November 1 to November 5, 2013.

== Medal table ==
* Host nation (Malaysia)

Rank	NOC	Gold	Silver	Bronze	Total
1	China	17	1	0	18
2	Iran	7	0	3	10
3	Malaysia*	4	5	5	14
4	Vietnam	3	6	3	12
5	Russia	3	3	2	8
6	Macau	3	2	2	7
7	Japan	2	4	2	8
8	Hong Kong	2	3	2	7
9	South Korea	1	4	5	10
10	Philippines	1	2	3	6
11	Indonesia	1	1	3	5
12	Ukraine	1	1	1	3
13	Singapore	1	1	0	2
14	Egypt	0	2	4	6
14	India	0	2	4	6
14	Italy	0	2	4	6
17	Chinese Taipei	0	2	3	5
18	Turkey	0	1	4	5
19	United States	0	1	2	3
20	France	0	1	1	2
21	Bermuda	0	1	0	1
21	Brazil	0	1	0	1
21	Canada	0	1	0	1
24	Algeria	0	0	2	2
24	Sweden	0	0	2	2
24	Tunisia	0	0	2	2
27	Afghanistan	0	0	1	1
27	Australia	0	0	1	1
27	Kazakhstan	0	0	1	1
27	Sri Lanka	0	0	1	1
27	Uzbekistan	0	0	1	1
Totals (31 entries)		46	47	64	157

== Medalists ==
=== Men's taolu ===
Event	Gold	Silver	Bronze
Changquan	Wang Xi; China	Ng Say Yoke; Malaysia	Jo Kye-yong; South Korea
Changquan; Compulsory	Leung Man Chun; Hong Kong	Yeap Wai Kin; Malaysia	Wu Nok In; Macau
Daoshu	Trần Xuân Hiệp; Vietnam	Cho Seung-jae; South Korea	Ng Say Yoke; Malaysia
Gunshu	Jia Rui; Macau	Daisuke Ichikizaki; Japan	Cho Seung-jae; South Korea
Jianshu	Tomoya Okawa; Japan	Yeap Wai Kin; Malaysia	Andrey Soloviev; Russia
Qiangshu	Yu Te; China	Tomoya Okawa; Japan	Chu Chi Wai; Macau
Nanquan	Ho Mun Hua; Malaysia	Koki Nakata; Japan	Farshad Arabi; Iran
Nanquan; Compulsory	Lee Yong-mun; South Korea	Jason Liu; United States	Ulderico Ascione; Italy
Nandao	Wu Jielong; China	Huang Junhua; Macau	Farshad Arabi; Iran
Nangun	Li Fukui; China	Phạm Quốc Khánh; Vietnam	Hsu Kai-kuei; Chinese Taipei
Taijiquan	Chai Yunlong; China	Lee Yang; Malaysia	Daniel Parantac; Philippines
Taijiquan; Compulsory	Chong Ka Seng; Macau	Samuel Tan; Singapore	Pierre Rouvière; France
Taijijian	Iao Chon In; Macau	Kim Dong-yeong; South Korea	Jack Loh; Malaysia
Duilian	Iran; Mohsen Ahmadi; Ebrahim Fathi; Navid Makvandi	Philippines; Daniel Parantac; John Keithley Chan; Norlence Catolico	South Korea; Cho Seung-jae; Kim Tae-ho; Jo Kye-yong
Duilian	Iran; Mohsen Ahmadi; Ebrahim Fathi; Navid Makvandi	Philippines; Daniel Parantac; John Keithley Chan; Norlence Catolico	Hong Kong; Leung Ka Wai; Leung Cheuk Hei; Cheng Chung Hang

=== Women's taolu ===
Event	Gold	Silver	Bronze
Changquan	Shen Guangmei; China	Geng Xiaoling; Hong Kong	Dương Thúy Vi; Vietnam
Changquan; Compulsory	Phoon Eyin; Malaysia	Liudmyla Temna; Ukraine	Hanieh Rajabi; Iran
Daoshu	Geng Xiaoling; Hong Kong	Hoàng Thị Phương Giang; Vietnam	Chai Fong Wei; Malaysia
Gunshu	Zheng Shaoyi; China	Geng Xiaoling; Hong Kong	Chai Fong Wei; Malaysia
Jianshu	Kan Wencong; China	Dương Thúy Vi; Vietnam	Keiko Yamaguchi; Japan
Qiangshu	Dương Thúy Vi; Vietnam	Elif Akyüz; Turkey	Emily Fan; United States
Nanquan	Wei Hong; China	Lin Chih-yu; Chinese Taipei	Ivana Ardelia Irmanto; Indonesia
Nanquan; Compulsory	Tai Cheau Xuen; Malaysia	Irina Saulina; Russia	Elizabeth Lim; Australia
Nandao	Diana Bong; Malaysia	Lin Chih-yu; Chinese Taipei	Yuen Ka Ying; Hong Kong
Nangun	Misaki Saka; Japan	Diana Bong; Malaysia	Lin Chih-yu; Chinese Taipei
Taijiquan	Zhuang Yingying; China	Lindswell Kwok; Indonesia	Naoko Sato; Japan
Taijiquan; Compulsory	Ho Lin Ying; Singapore	Romina Quatela; Italy	Anel Sanatkyzy; Kazakhstan
Taijijian	Lindswell Kwok; Indonesia	Ai Uchida; Japan	Chen Yi-ying; Chinese Taipei
Duilian	Ukraine; Myroslava Mala; Anna Derbenyova; Tetyana Kondratyeva	Hong Kong; Zheng Tin Hui; Yuen Ka Ying; Fung Wing See	Shared silver
Duilian	Ukraine; Myroslava Mala; Anna Derbenyova; Tetyana Kondratyeva	Macau; Li Yi; Tan Dong Mei; Ho Si Hang	Shared silver

=== Men's sanda ===
Event	Gold	Silver	Bronze
48 kg	Song Buer; China	Jessie Aligaga; Philippines	M. Chandra Singh; India
48 kg	Song Buer; China	Jessie Aligaga; Philippines	Lakshman Gunasekera; Sri Lanka
52 kg	Benjie Rivera; Philippines	Hoàng Hồng Tú; Vietnam	Santosh Kumar; India
52 kg	Benjie Rivera; Philippines	Hoàng Hồng Tú; Vietnam	Lee Wei Loong; Malaysia
56 kg	Zhu Yangtao; China	Lee Dong-hoon; South Korea	Nguyễn Xuân Linh; Vietnam
56 kg	Zhu Yangtao; China	Lee Dong-hoon; South Korea	Youcef Hamrit; Algeria
60 kg	Ali Magomedov; Russia	Bàn Văn Trọng; Vietnam	Khalid Hotak; Afghanistan
60 kg	Ali Magomedov; Russia	Bàn Văn Trọng; Vietnam	Jean Claude Saclag; Philippines
65 kg	Mohsen Mohammadseifi; Iran	Nguyễn Văn Tài; Vietnam	Johan Lindqvist; Sweden
65 kg	Mohsen Mohammadseifi; Iran	Nguyễn Văn Tài; Vietnam	Ham Gwan-sik; South Korea
70 kg	Ali Abdulkhalikov; Russia	Shen Li; China	Yoo Sang-hoon; South Korea
70 kg	Ali Abdulkhalikov; Russia	Shen Li; China	Ichraf Haddad; Tunisia
75 kg	Zhang Kaiyin; China	Ahmed Ibrahim; Egypt	Rajani Deori; India
75 kg	Zhang Kaiyin; China	Ahmed Ibrahim; Egypt	İsmail Uzuner; Turkey
80 kg	Amir Fazli; Iran	Muslim Salikhov; Russia	Alejandro Cisne; United States
80 kg	Amir Fazli; Iran	Muslim Salikhov; Russia	Abdelhamid El-Sayad; Egypt
85 kg	Hamid Reza Gholipour; Iran	Arslan Bektimirov; Russia	Dmytro Batok; Ukraine
85 kg	Hamid Reza Gholipour; Iran	Arslan Bektimirov; Russia	Abdelkader Chabane; Algeria
90 kg	Bian Qingge; China	Hisham Abdelhamid; Egypt	Tudor Mocanu; Italy
90 kg	Bian Qingge; China	Hisham Abdelhamid; Egypt	Rustam Yusupov; Uzbekistan
+90 kg	Bozigit Ataev; Russia	Jermal Woolridge; Bermuda	Ahmed Samir; Egypt
+90 kg	Bozigit Ataev; Russia	Jermal Woolridge; Bermuda	Tony Miocic; Sweden

=== Women's sanda ===
Event	Gold	Silver	Bronze
48 kg	Nguyễn Thị Chinh; Vietnam	Yumnam Sanathoi Devi; India	Junita Malau; Indonesia
48 kg	Nguyễn Thị Chinh; Vietnam	Yumnam Sanathoi Devi; India	Mayada Aly; Egypt
52 kg	Elaheh Mansourian; Iran	Kim Hye-bin; South Korea	Priscilla Hertati Lumban Gaol; Indonesia
52 kg	Elaheh Mansourian; Iran	Kim Hye-bin; South Korea	Evita Zamora; Philippines
56 kg	Mao Yabei; China	Maristela Alves; Brazil	Sümeyye Barbaros; Turkey
56 kg	Mao Yabei; China	Maristela Alves; Brazil	Debora Felicetti; Italy
60 kg	Wang Cong; China	Elena Ghezzi; Italy	Wangkhem Sandhyarani Devi; India
60 kg	Wang Cong; China	Elena Ghezzi; Italy	Intissar Ben Sassi; Tunisia
65 kg	Maryam Hashemi; Iran	Delphine Stambouli; France	Hilal Şen; Turkey
65 kg	Maryam Hashemi; Iran	Delphine Stambouli; France	Ekaterina Vinkovatova; Russia
70 kg	Meng Xin; China	Pooja Kadian; India	Sherouk Ahmed; Egypt
70 kg	Meng Xin; China	Pooja Kadian; India	Antonia Di Biase; Italy
75 kg	Shahrbanoo Mansourian; Iran	Maria Hayball; Canada	Nguyễn Thị Hải Yến; Vietnam
75 kg	Shahrbanoo Mansourian; Iran	Maria Hayball; Canada	Hatice Kalencik; Turkey
