= Silver Lotus Medal of Honour =

Silver Lotus Medal of Honour Medalha de Honra Lótus de Prata 銀蓮花榮譽勳章
- Awarded for: providing exceptional services to the Macao SAR, in its image and good name, both in the Region and abroad, or for providing services, in any domain, of great relevance to the development of the Macao SAR.
- Presented by: Macau
- Post-nominals: SLM
- Established: 2001
- First award: 2001

Precedence
- Next (higher): Golden Lotus Medal of Honour

The Silver Lotus Medal of Honour (Portuguese: Medalha de Honra Lótus de Prata; Chinese: 銀蓮花榮譽勳章; pinyin: Yín liánhuā róngyù xūnzhāng) is the third-highest award under the MSAR honors and awards system which recognizes lifelong and highly significant contributions to the well-being of Macau.

== List of recipients ==
Year	Winners
2001	Roque Choi
2001	Liang Pi Yun
2001	Peter Peng
2002	Ung Si Meng
2002	Ieong Sau Man
2002	Pun Iok Lan
2003	Wong Hau Hang
2003	Kong Veng Fai
2003	Vong Fong Va
2004	Yuen Tze Wing
2004	Tong Kin Mao
2004	Fung Kam Hee
2005	Cheong Chou Kei
2005	Lo Weng
2007	Ngan In Leng
2009	Lam Kam Seng
2009	Ng So Foon
2010	Io Hong Meng
2011	Ho Teng-iat
2011	Wan Chun
2012	Au Ieong Iun Han
2012	Leong Chong Kao
2013	Lei Sio Iok
2013	Jia Rui
2014	Chio Ngan Ieng
2015	José Lai
2015	Sin Wai Hang
2015	Chan Meng Kam
2015	Chan Kam Meng
2016	Kou Hoi In
2016	Van Kuan Lok
2017	Lei Loi Tak
2017	Vong Kok Seng
2018	Fong Chi-keong
2018	Ho Hao Tong
2018	Kwan Tsui-hang
2018	Huang Junhua
2019	Leonel Alberto Alves
2019	Cheang Chi Keong
2019	Ho Sut Heng
2019	Wong Eddie Yue Kei
2019	Chan Chak Mo
2019	Nam Kwon Company Limited
2020	Bank of China Macau Branch
2020	Li Ma
2022	Banco Nacional Ultramarino
2022	Banco Tai Fung
2022	Macau Red Cross
2022	Kevin Lai
2023	Li Yi
