= Pooja Kadian =

Indian wushu practitioner

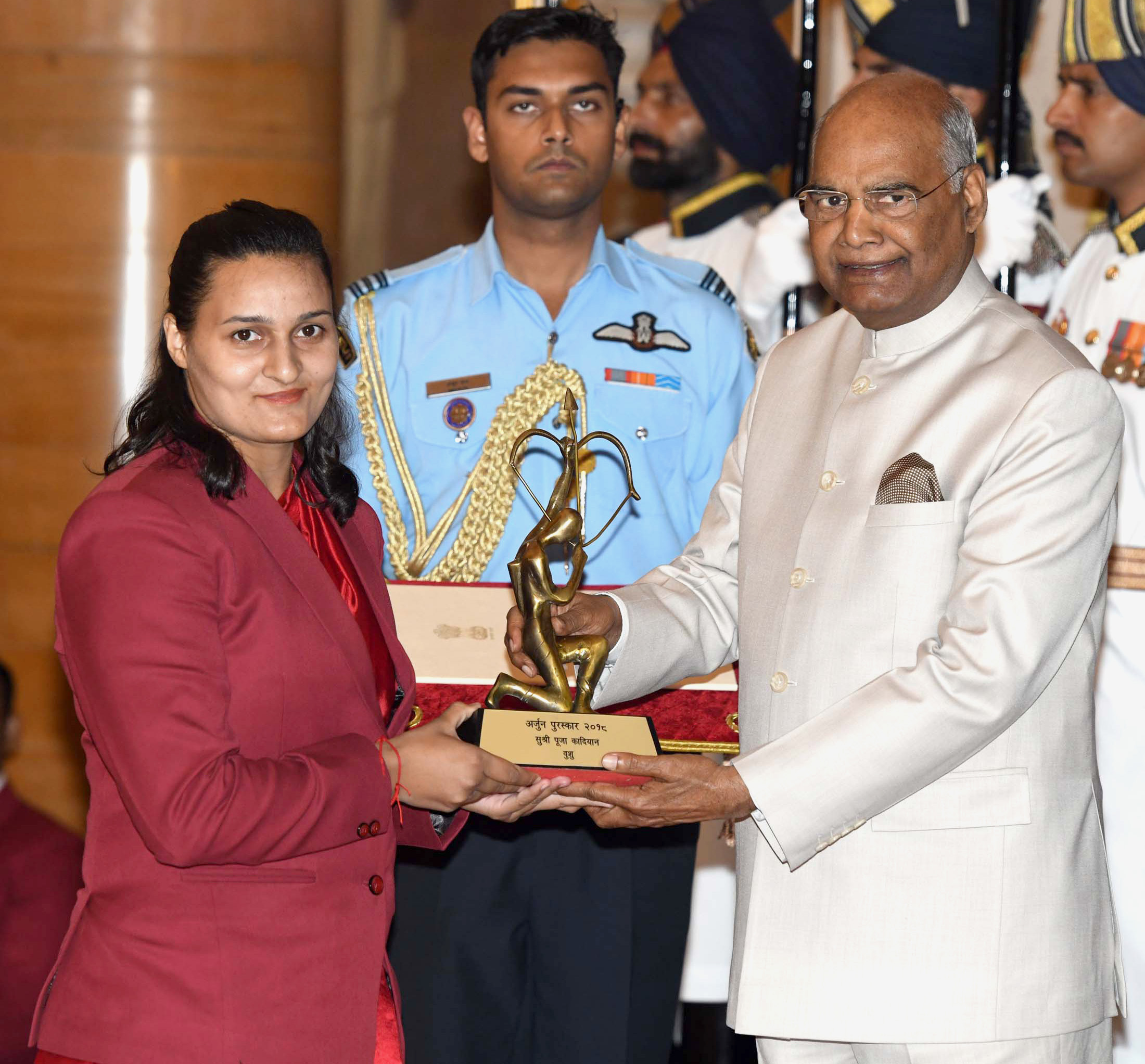
- The President Ram Nath Kovind presenting the Arjuna Award, 2018 to Pooja Kadian for Wushu.

Personal information
- Nationality: Indian
- Born: 1 October 1991 (age 34) Jhajjar district, Haryana, India
- Weight: 75 kg (165 lb)

Sport
- Country: India
- Sport: Wushu
- Event: Sanda
Medal record
Women's Sanda
Representing India
World Championships
| Silver medal – second place | 2011 Ankara | 60 kg |
| Silver medal – second place | 2013 Kuala Lumpur | 70 kg |
| Silver medal – second place | 2015 Jakarta | 75 kg |
| Gold medal – first place | 2017 Kazan | 75 kg |
World Games
| Silver medal – second place | 2013 World Games | 60kg |

Pooja Kadian (born 1 October 1991 is an Indian Wushu player. She won Silver Medal in invitational sports of Wushu at the 9th World Games at Cali in Colombia, in Women's Sanda 60 kg.

Kadian previously won gold in the 12th South Asian Games and alsobagged silver medals in the World Games 2013 and the World Championship in 2013 and 2015. She also won gold medals in the National Games in 2014 and 2017.

Pooja won the first ever gold medal for India at 2017 World Wushu Championships.

== Awards ==
She was awarded by the Government of India, the prestigious Arjuna Award in (2018) for her performance in 2017 World Wushu Championships.
