= Cho Seung-jae =

Korean wushu practitioner

Personal information
- Born: December 12, 1990 (age 35) South Korea
- Height: 1.72 m (5 ft 8 in)
- Weight: 69 kg (152 lb)

Sport
- Sport: Wushu
- Events: Changquan, Daoshu, Gunshu
- Team: Korean Wushu Team
Medal record
Representing South Korea
Men's Wushu Taolu
World Championships
Gold medal – first place	2019 Shanghai	Shuangdao
Silver medal – second place	2013 Kuala Lumpur	Daoshu
Silver medal – second place	2015 Jakarta	Daoshu
Silver medal – second place	2017 Kazan	Shuangdao
Silver medal – second place	2019 Shanghai	Gunshu
Silver medal – second place	2019 Shanghai	Duilian
Bronze medal – third place	2013 Kuala Lumpur	Gunshu
Bronze medal – third place	2013 Kuala Lumpur	Duilian
Bronze medal – third place	2015 Jakarta	Gunshu
Asian Games
Silver medal – second place	2018 Jakarta-Palembang	Daoshu+Gunshu
Asian Championships
Gold medal – first place	2016 Taoyuan	Gunshu
Silver medal – second place	2012 Ho Chi Minh City	Gunshu
East Asian Games
Silver medal – second place	2013 Tianjin	Daoshu+Gunshu
Silver medal – second place	2013 Tianjin	Duilian
World Junior Championships
Silver medal – second place	2008 Bali	Daoshu (A)
Asian Junior Championships
Gold medal – first place	2007 Yeongju	Gunshu (A)
Silver medal – second place	2007 Yeongju	Daoshu (A)

Cho Seung-jae (Korean: 조승재; RR: joseungjae; born December 12, 1990) is a wushu taolu athlete from South Korea.

== Career ==
=== Junior ===
During his junior career, Cho was a gold medalist and silver medalist at the 2007 Asian Junior Wushu Championships, and a silver medalist in jianshu at the 2008 World Junior Wushu Championships.

=== Senior ===
Cho made his senior international debut at the 2012 Asian Wushu Championships where he won a silver medal in gunshu. He then was a double silver medalist in daoshu and gunshu combined as well as in duilian at the 2013 East Asian Games. He then won a silver medal in daoshu and bronze medals in gunshu and duilian at the 2013 World Wushu Championships. Two years later, Cho won a silver medal in daoshu and bronze medal in gunshu at the 2015 World Wushu Championships, and became the Asian champion in gunshu at the 2016 Asian Wushu Championships. At the 2017 World Wushu Championships, he won a silver medal in shuangdao. He then competed in the 2018 Asian Games where he won the silver medal in men's daoshu and gunshu combined. His most recent competition was at the 2019 World Wushu Championships where he was the world champion in shuangdao and a double silver medalist in gunshu and duilian.

== See also ==
- List of Asian Games medalists in wushu
