= Liu Xuxu =

Hong Kong wushu practitioner

Personal information
- Born: 10 January 1989 (age 37)
- Occupation(s): Martial artist, athlete
- Height: 1.58 m (5 ft 2 in)

Sport
- Sport: Wushu
- Event(s): Changquan. Daoshu, Gunshu
- Team: Hong Kong Wushu Team
Medal record
Representing Hong Kong
Women's Wushu Taolu
World Championships
Gold medal – first place	2015 Jakarta	Daoshu
Gold medal – first place	2015 Jakarta	Duilian
Gold medal – first place	2017 Kazan	Daoshu
Gold medal – first place	2019 Shanghai	Gunshu
Gold medal – first place	2019 Shanghai	Duilian
Silver medal – second place	2015 Jakarta	Changquan
Silver medal – second place	2017 Kazan	Changquan
Silver medal – second place	2019 Shanghai	Daoshu
Bronze medal – third place	2017 Kazan	Gunshu
World Cup
Gold medal – first place	2016 Fuzhou	Changquan
Gold medal – first place	2016 Fuzhou	Daoshu
Gold medal – first place	2016 Fuzhou	Gunshu
Gold medal – first place	2018 Yangon	Daoshu
Gold medal – first place	2018 Yangon	Gunshu
Bronze medal – third place	2016 Fuzhou	Duilian
Asian Games
Silver medal – second place	2022 Hangzhou	Changquan

Liu Xuxu (simplified Chinese: 刘徐徐; traditional Chinese: 劉徐徐; pinyin: Liúxúxú; born 10 January, 1989) is a professional wushu taolu athlete from Hong Kong. Within three renditions of the World Wushu Championships, she has already become a nine-time medalist and five-time world champion.

== Career ==
Originally a member of the Shandong Wushu Team, Liu relocated to Hong Kong and made her debut at the 2015 World Wushu Championships in Jakarta, Indonesia, where she became the world champion in daoshu and duilian, and also won a silver medal in changquan. Her success qualified her for the 1st Taolu World Cup in Fuzhou, China, where she became a triple gold medalist in her primary disciplines and also won a bronze medal in duilian. A year later, she competed in the 2017 World Wushu Championships in Kazan, Russia, and won medals of all colors in her main disciplines. At the following world cup in Yangon in 2018, she was a double gold medalist in daoshu and gunshu, but did not compete in changquan. At the 2019 World Wushu Championships, she won the gold in gunshu and duilian, a silver medal in daoshu, and finished in fourth place in changquan. Four years later at the 2022 Asian Games, Liu won the silver medal in women's changquan.

== Competitive history ==
Year	Event	CQ	DS	GS	GRP
2015	World Championships	4	1st place, gold medalist(s)	4	1st place, gold medalist(s)
2016	Asian Championships	3rd place, bronze medalist(s)	3rd place, bronze medalist(s)	1st place, gold medalist(s)	
2016	World Cup	1st place, gold medalist(s)	1st place, gold medalist(s)	1st place, gold medalist(s)	3rd place, bronze medalist(s)
2017	World Championships	2nd place, silver medalist(s)	1st place, gold medalist(s)	3rd place, bronze medalist(s)	
2018	World Cup		1st place, gold medalist(s)	1st place, gold medalist(s)	
2019	World Championships	4	2nd place, silver medalist(s)	1st place, gold medalist(s)	1st place, gold medalist(s)
2020	did not compete due to COVID-19 pandemic				
2023	Asian Games	2nd place, silver medalist(s)			
