= Lee Ha-sung =

Korean wushu practitioner

Personal information
- Born: June 6, 1994 (age 32)
- Height: 1.63 m (5 ft 4 in)
- Weight: 60 kg (132 lb)

Sport
- Sport: Wushu
- Events: Changquan, Jianshu, Qiangshu
- Team: Korean Wushu Team
Medal record
Representing South Korea
Men's Wushu Taolu
World Games
Silver medal – second place	2022 Birmingham	Changquan
World Championships
Gold medal – first place	2015 Jakarta	Changquan (compulsory)
Silver medal – second place	2017 Kazan	Jianshu
Silver medal – second place	2017 Kazan	Duilian
Silver medal – second place	2019 Shanghai	Duilian
Bronze medal – third place	2019 Shanghai	Changquan
Bronze medal – third place	2025 Brasília	Gunshu
World Cup
Bronze medal – third place	2018 Yangon	Jianshu
Asian Games
Gold medal – first place	2014 Incheon	Changquan

Lee Ha-sung (Korean: 이하성; RR: ihasseong; born 6 June 1994) is a wushu taolu athlete from South Korea. He was a world champion in 2015 and gold medalist at the Asian Games in 2014.

== Career ==
On his international debut, Lee won the first gold medal for South Korea at the 2014 Asian Games in the men's changquan event. He then competed at the 2015 World Wushu Championships where he won a gold medal in the compulsory changquan event. Two years later at the 2017 World Wushu Championships, Lee was a double silver medalist in jianshu and duilian. At the 2018 Asian Games, Lee had a major deduction on one of his difficulty movements and finished in 12th place in the men's changquan event, thus was unable to defend his 2014 title. A year later. he won a bronze medal in changquan and a silver medal in duilian at the 2019 World Wushu Championships.

== Competitive History ==
Year	Event	CQ	JS	GS	GRP	AA
2014	Asian Games	1st place, gold medalist(s)				
2015	World Championships	1st place, gold medalist(s)	4	4		
2017	World Championships	9	2nd place, silver medalist(s)	5	2nd place, silver medalist(s)	
2018	World Cup		3rd place, bronze medalist(s)	4		
2018	Asian Games	12				
2019	World Championships	3rd place, bronze medalist(s)	5	4	2nd place, silver medalist(s)	
2019	World Martial Arts Masterships	1	1	1		1st place, gold medalist(s)
2020	did not compete due to COVID-19 pandemic					
2021	did not compete due to COVID-19 pandemic					
2022	World Games	2nd place, silver medalist(s)				

== See also ==
- List of Asian Games medalists in wushu
