= 2015 World Wushu Championships =

13th edition of the World Wushu Championships

- Venue: Istora Senayan
- Location: Jakarta, Indonesia
- Dates: 14–18 November 2015

The 2015 World Wushu Championships was the 13th edition of the World Wushu Championships. It was held at the Istora Senayan in Jakarta, Indonesia from November 14 to November 18, 2015. Starting with this rendition of the WWC, the top-eight finishing athletes in taolu events would qualify to compete in the Taolu World Cup.

== Medal table ==
Rank	Nation	Gold	Silver	Bronze	Total
1	China	14	1	0	15
2	Indonesia	7	3	6	16
3	Iran	6	3	1	10
4	Hong Kong	5	4	2	11
5	Russia	4	4	3	11
6	Malaysia	3	4	4	11
7	South Korea	2	3	4	9
8	Macau	2	2	1	5
8	Philippines	2	2	1	5
10	Egypt	2	0	6	8
11	Singapore	1	1	2	4
12	Brazil	1	0	3	4
13	Australia	1	0	1	2
14	Vietnam	0	4	3	7
15	Japan	0	4	2	6
16	India	0	3	1	4
17	United States	0	2	5	7
18	Turkey	0	2	2	4
19	France	0	1	2	3
19	Sweden	0	1	2	3
21	Chinese Taipei	0	1	1	2
21	Kyrgyzstan	0	1	1	2
23	Belarus	0	1	0	1
23	Czech Republic	0	1	0	1
23	Myanmar	0	1	0	1
26	Ukraine	0	0	3	3
27	Armenia	0	0	2	2
27	Canada	0	0	2	2
27	Romania	0	0	2	2
30	Great Britain	0	0	1	1
30	Italy	0	0	1	1
30	Jordan	0	0	1	1
30	Kazakhstan	0	0	1	1
30	Lebanon	0	0	1	1
Totals (34 entries)		50	49	67	166

== Medalists ==
=== Men's taolu ===
Event	Gold	Silver	Bronze
Changquan	Sun Peiyuan; China	Daisuke Ichikizaki; Japan	Lee Yong-hyun; South Korea
Changquan; Compulsory	Lee Ha-sung; South Korea	Wong Weng Son; Malaysia	Justin Benedik; United States
Daoshu	Vladimir Maksimov; Russia	Cho Seung-jae; South Korea	Nguyễn Mạnh Quyền; Vietnam
Gunshu	Vladimir Maksimov; Russia	Wang Chen-ming; Chinese Taipei	Cho Seung-jae; South Korea
Jianshu	Charles Sutanto; Indonesia	Andrey Soloviev; Russia	Wong Weng Son; Malaysia
Qiangshu	Charles Sutanto; Indonesia	Wong Weng Son; Malaysia	Tomoya Okawa; Japan
Nanquan	Wang Di; China	Huang Junhua; Macau	Ho Mun Hua; Malaysia
Nanquan; Compulsory	Chio Wai Keong; Macau	Tan Xiang Tian; Singapore	Phillip Wong; Canada
Nandao	Ho Mun Hua; Malaysia	Farshad Arabi; Iran	Lai Po-wei; Chinese Taipei
Nangun	Huang Junhua; Macau	Lee Yong-mun; South Korea	Harris Horatius; Indonesia
Taijiquan	Chen Zhouli; China	Tomohiro Araya; Japan	Fredy; Indonesia
Taijiquan; Compulsory	Jack Loh; Malaysia	Nyein Chan Ko Ko; Myanmar	Chong Ka Seng; Macau
Taijijian	Ma Jianchao; China	Tomohiro Araya; Japan	Jack Loh; Malaysia
Dadao	Amir El-Sayed; Egypt	Wu Nok In; Macau	Fung Jin Jie; Singapore
Xingyiquan	Tan Xiang Tian; Singapore	Maxime Frankinet; France	Necmettin Erbakan Akyüz; Turkey
Duilian	China; Wu Xiaolong; Shi Longlong	Iran; Ebrahim Fathi; Mohsen Ahmadi; Navid Makvandi	Ukraine; Andriy Koval; Dmytro Panasiuk; Roman Reva

=== Women's taolu ===
Event	Gold	Silver	Bronze
Changquan	Geng Xiaoling; Hong Kong	Liu Xuxu; Hong Kong	Dương Thúy Vi; Vietnam
Changquan; Compulsory	Sandra Konstantinova; Russia	Zahra Kiani; Iran	Amy Li; United States
Daoshu	Liu Xuxu; Hong Kong	Amy Li; United States	Ganna Tereshchenko; Ukraine
Gunshu	Geng Xiaoling; Hong Kong	Daria Tarasova; Russia	Sandra Konstantinova; Russia
Jianshu	Seo Hee-ju; South Korea	Dương Thúy Vi; Vietnam	Winnie Cai; Canada
Qiangshu	Lai Xiaoxiao; China	Dương Thúy Vi; Vietnam	Ayaka Honda; Japan
Nanquan	Wei Hailing; China	Diana Bong; Malaysia	Juwita Niza Wasni; Indonesia
Nanquan; Compulsory	Elizabeth Lim; Australia	Lucy Lee; United States	Tetyana Kondratyeva; Ukraine
Nandao	Juwita Niza Wasni; Indonesia	Ivana Ardelia Irmanto; Indonesia	Lucy Lee; United States
Nangun	Juwita Niza Wasni; Indonesia	Yuen Ka Ying; Hong Kong	Ivana Ardelia Irmanto; Indonesia
Taijiquan	Lindswell Kwok; Indonesia	Chen Suijin; Hong Kong	Ng Shin Yii; Malaysia
Taijiquan; Compulsory	Chan Lu Yi; Malaysia	Agatha Wong; Philippines	Ho Lin Ying; Singapore
Taijijian	Lindswell Kwok; Indonesia	Naoko Ichikizaki; Japan	Chen Suijin; Hong Kong
Baguazhang	Tania Sakanaka; Brazil	Chen Suijin; Hong Kong	Hager Mohamed; Egypt
Shuangjian	Zheng Tianhui; Hong Kong	Elif Akyüz; Turkey	Daria Tarasova; Russia
Duilian	Hong Kong; Yuen Ka Ying; Liu Xuxu; Zheng Tianhui	Malaysia; Chai Fong Wei; Phoon Eyin	United States; Amy Li; Emily Fan

=== Men's sanda ===
Event	Gold	Silver	Bronze
48 kg	Zhu Jihui; China	Yosef Fau Neonnub; Indonesia	Ahmed Nofal; Egypt
48 kg	Zhu Jihui; China	Yosef Fau Neonnub; Indonesia	Sargis Sargsyan; Armenia
52 kg	Arnel Mandal; Philippines	Uchit Sharma; India	Gunawan; Indonesia
52 kg	Arnel Mandal; Philippines	Uchit Sharma; India	Selahattin Yıldız; Turkey
56 kg	Yusuf Widiyanto; Indonesia	Tô Văn Báu; Vietnam	Avazbek Amanbekov; Kyrgyzstan
56 kg	Yusuf Widiyanto; Indonesia	Tô Văn Báu; Vietnam	Islam Shehata; Egypt
60 kg	Kong Hongxing; China	Ali Magomedov; Russia	Francisco Solis; Philippines
60 kg	Kong Hongxing; China	Ali Magomedov; Russia	Surya Bhanu Pratap Singh; India
65 kg	Xu Jifu; China	Park Seung-mo; South Korea	Kazbek Mamaev; Russia
65 kg	Xu Jifu; China	Park Seung-mo; South Korea	Jafar Shirzadeh; Iran
70 kg	Mohsen Mohammadseifi; Iran	Ali Ay; Turkey	Ali Al-Qaisi; Jordan
70 kg	Mohsen Mohammadseifi; Iran	Ali Ay; Turkey	Caio Pitoli; Brazil
75 kg	Zhang Kun; China	Ali Abdulkhalikov; Russia	Artur Malkhasyan; Armenia
75 kg	Zhang Kun; China	Ali Abdulkhalikov; Russia	Ayman Galal; Egypt
80 kg	Muslim Salikhov; Russia	Fu Gaofeng; China	Georges Eid; Lebanon
80 kg	Muslim Salikhov; Russia	Fu Gaofeng; China	Bagdat Kenzhetayev; Kazakhstan
85 kg	Amir Fazli; Iran	None awarded (Note: Dmytro Batok (UKR) disqualified due to doping)	Nicholas Evagorou; Great Britain
85 kg	Amir Fazli; Iran	None awarded	Xavier Foupa-Pokam; France
90 kg	Hamid Reza Gholipour; Iran	Illia Varchenia; Belarus	Mihai Ignat; Romania
90 kg	Hamid Reza Gholipour; Iran	Illia Varchenia; Belarus	Robin Larsson; Sweden
+90 kg	Motaz Rady; Egypt	Kuan Abdyraimov; Kyrgyzstan	John Bennet; Australia
+90 kg	Motaz Rady; Egypt	Kuan Abdyraimov; Kyrgyzstan	Karl Albrektsson; Sweden

=== Women's sanda ===
Event	Gold	Silver	Bronze
48 kg	Divine Wally; Philippines	Hoàng Thị Luân; Vietnam	Junita Malau; Indonesia
48 kg	Divine Wally; Philippines	Hoàng Thị Luân; Vietnam	Byeon Bo-kyeong; South Korea
52 kg	Zhang Luan; China	Yumnam Sanathoi Devi; India	Alice da Luz; Brazil
52 kg	Zhang Luan; China	Yumnam Sanathoi Devi; India	Kim Hye-bin; South Korea
56 kg	Liu Lingling; China	Elin Öberg; Sweden	Maristela Alves; Brazil
56 kg	Liu Lingling; China	Elin Öberg; Sweden	Ragan Beedy; United States
60 kg	Sedigheh Daryaei; Iran	Moria Manalu; Indonesia	Cherie Man; Hong Kong
60 kg	Sedigheh Daryaei; Iran	Moria Manalu; Indonesia	Nguyễn Thị Trang; Vietnam
65 kg	Shahrbanoo Mansourian; Iran	Hergie Bacyadan; Philippines	Delphine Stambouli; France
65 kg	Shahrbanoo Mansourian; Iran	Hergie Bacyadan; Philippines	Walaa Mohamed; Egypt
70 kg	Maryam Hashemi; Iran	Veronika Kohútová; Czech Republic	Cristiana Stancu; Romania
70 kg	Maryam Hashemi; Iran	Veronika Kohútová; Czech Republic	Ilaria Cipolla; Italy
75 kg	Li Yuan; China	Pooja Kadian; India	Sherouk Ahmed; Egypt
75 kg	Li Yuan; China	Pooja Kadian; India	None awarded
