= Chen Suijin =

Hong Kong wushu practitioner

Personal information
- Born: 6 January 1991 (age 35)
- Height: 1.61 m (5 ft 3 in)

Sport
- Sport: Wushu
- Event(s): Taijiquan, Taijijian
- Team: Hong Kong Wushu Team (2013-23)
Medal record
Representing Hong Kong
Women's Wushu Taolu
World Championships
Gold medal – first place	2017 Kazan	Taijijian
Gold medal – first place	2019 Shanghai	Baguazhang
Silver medal – second place	2015 Jakarta	Taijiquan
Silver medal – second place	2015 Jakarta	Baguazhang
Silver medal – second place	2017 Kazan	Baguazhang
Bronze medal – third place	2015 Jakarta	Taijijian
World Cup
Gold medal – first place	2016 Fuzhou	Taijiquan
Gold medal – first place	2016 Fuzhou	Taijijian
Gold medal – first place	2018 Yangon	Taijiquan
Gold medal – first place	2018 Yangon	Taijijian
Asian Games
Bronze medal – third place	2022 Hangzhou	Taijiquan+Taijijian
Asian Championships
Gold medal – first place	2016 Taoyuan	Taijiquan
Silver medal – second place	2016 Taoyuan	Taijijian
Bronze medal – third place	2016 Taoyuan	Taijiquan Doubles

Chen Suijin (Chinese: 陈穗津; pinyin: Chén suī jǐn; born: 6 January, 1991) is a professional wushu taolu athlete from Hong Kong specialising in taijiquan.

== Career ==
Chen made her international debut at the 2015 World Wushu Championships in Jakarta, Indonesia, where she won silver medals in taijiquan and baguazhang and a bronze medal in taijijian. This qualified her for the 2016 Taolu World Cup in Fuzhou, China, where she won gold medals in taijiquan and taijijian. The same year, she also won medals of all colors at the Asian Wushu Championships. A year later, Chen competed at the 2017 World Wushu Championships in Kazan, Russia, where she became the world champion in taijijian and additionally won a silver medal in banguazhang. At the following 2018 Taolu World Cup in Yangon, Myanmar, she once again won gold medals in taijiquan and taijijian. A year later at the 2019 World Wushu Championships in Shanghai, China, she won the gold medal in baguazhang.

After the COVID-19 pandemic, Chen's first major competition was the 2022 Asian Games (hosted in 2023) in Hangzhou, China, where she won the bronze medal in women's taijiquan. Her last competition was at the 2023 World Wushu Championships in Fort Worth, United States, but did not place in her events.

== See also ==
- List of Asian Games medalists in wushu
