= Wushu at the 2018 Asian Games – Women's changquan =

Women's changquan at the 2018 Asian Games
- Venue: Jakarta International Expo
- Dates: 22 August 2018
- Competitors: 9 from 8 nations

Medalists
gold medal	Qi Xinyi	China
silver medal	Li Yi	Macau
bronze medal	Hoàng Thị Phương Giang	Vietnam

The women's changquan competition at the 2018 Asian Games in Jakarta, Indonesia was held on 22 August at the JIExpo Kemayoran Hall B3.

== Schedule ==
All times are Western Indonesia Time (UTC+07:00)

Date	Time	Event
Wednesday, 22 August 2018	09:00	Final

== Results ==
Rank	Athlete	Score
1st place, gold medalist(s)	Qi Xinyi (CHN)	9.74
2nd place, silver medalist(s)	Li Yi (MAC)	9.72
3rd place, bronze medalist(s)	Hoàng Thị Phương Giang (VIE)	9.71
4	Sou Cho Man (MAC)	9.70
5	Geng Xiaoling (HKG)	9.62
6	Felda Elvira Santoso (INA)	9.45
7	Sushmita Tamang (NEP)	9.25
8	Yu Chih-hsuan (TPE)	9.23
9	Sandy Oo (MYA)	8.70
