= Sports Merit Medal =

Sports Merit Medal Medalha de Mérito Desportivo 體育功績勳章
- Country: China
- Presented by: Macau
- Established: 2001
- First award: 2001

The Sports Merit Medal (Portuguese: Medalha de Mérito Desportivo; Chinese: 體育功績勳章; pinyin: Tǐyù gōngjī xūnzhāng) is an award established by the Government of Macau in 2001 to recognize significant contributions to sports of Macau.

== Recipients ==
Ano	Galardoados
2001	Van Kuan Lok
2001	Pau Ma Chong
2001	Eddie Lam
2002	Man Chong Kong
2002	Ng Va Kai
2002	Han Jing
2003	Lei Man Iam
2003	Choi Tong Hoi
2003	Chong Sao Lan
2004	Iao Mou Pong
2004	Macau Automobile Club
2005	Zeng Tie Ming
2005	Huang Yanhui
2005	Cheang Veng Kin
2006	Un Oi Mou
2007	Chan de Noronha Weng Kit
2007	Chui Tac Kong
2007	Jia Rui
2007	Cai Liangchan
2008	Chang Chin Nam
2008	Ieong Cheong Seng
2009	Vong Siu Va
2009	Lou Lan Fong
2010	Lam Fai Hong
2010	Ma Iao Hang
2010	Mok Kuok Heng
2011	Chu Chi Wai
2011	Hoi Long
2011	Chui Iu
2012	Lo Keng Chio
2012	Chong Coc Veng
2012	Wong Hang Cheong
2012	Kuan Sok Mui
2013	Lau Hong Meng
2013	Mak Chi Kun
2013	Choi Tat Meng
2014	Pun Keng Man
2014	Sam Kei
2015	Lo Leong Sports Association of Macau
2015	Che Kuong Hon
2015	Wong Meng Cheong
2015	Wong Un Un
2015	Sou Cho Man
2015	Macau Synchronized Swimming Team
2016	Macau General Wushu Association
2016	Mário Ferreira Sin
2016	Lau Vai Hong
2017	Macau Dragon and Lion Dance Federation
2017	Macau Karate Federation
2017	Eduardo Armando de Jesus Júnior
2018	Iao Chon In
2018	Li Yi
2018	Sou Soi Lam
2018	Hoi Long
2018	Wong Sok I
2019	Leong Chong Leng
2021	Kuok Kin Hang
2022	Lok Po Swimming Club
2023	Karate Men's team kata of the 19th Asian Games
2023	Kuok Kin Hang
2023	Cai Feilong
