= Wu Zhaohua =

Chinese wushu practitioner (born 1998)

Personal information
- Born: September 9, 1998 (age 28) Zongyang, Anhui, China
- Occupations: Martial artist, athlete
- Height: 1.7 m (5 ft 7 in)
- Weight: 67 kg (148 lb)

Sport
- Sport: Wushu
- Events: Changquan, Daoshu, Gunshu
- Team: Jiangsu Wushu Team
- Coached by: Zhang Li
Medal record
Men's Wushu Taolu
Representing China
World Games
Gold medal – first place	2022 Birmingham	Daoshu+Gunshu
World Combat Games
Gold medal – first place	2023 Riyadh	Daoshu+Gunshu
World Championships
Gold medal – first place	2019 Shanghai	Daoshu
Gold medal – first place	2019 Shanghai	Jiti
Asian Games
Gold medal – first place	2018 Jakarta-Palembang	Daoshu+Gunshu
Asian Championships
Gold medal – first place	2016 Taoyuan	Changquan

Wu Zhaohua (Chinese: 吴照华; pinyin: Wúzhàohuá; Born: September 9, 1998) is a professional wushu taolu athlete from China.

== Career ==
Wu began to practice wushu at the game of seven. He later joined the Jiangsu Wushu Team to train under Wang Zhengtian.

Wu's first major international debut was at the 2016 Asian Wushu Championships in Taoyuan, Taiwan, where he became the Asian champion in men's changquan. A year later, he competed in the 2017 National Games of China and won the silver medal in men's changquan all-around. Near the end of the same year, he won the championship title of the King of Kings Wushu Championship. He then competed in the 2018 Asian Games in Jakarta, Indonesia, where he won the gold medal in men's daoshu and gunshu. A year later, Wu competed at the 2019 World Wushu Championships in Shanghai, China, and won the first gold medal of the competition which was in the men's daoshu event. He also competed with the rest of the China wushu team in the group-set (jiti) event and won another gold medal.

At the 2021 National Games of China, the first major wushu competition since the beginning of the COVID-19 pandemic, Wu won the gold medal in men's changquan all-around. A year later, he won the gold medal in men's daoshu and gunshu combined at the 2022 World Games. A year later, he won the gold medal in the same event at the 2023 World Combat Games.

== Competitive history ==
Year	Event	CQ	DS	GS	GRP	AA
Senior						
2016	National Championships	3rd place, bronze medalist(s)	1st place, gold medalist(s)	3rd place, bronze medalist(s)		
2016	Asian Championships	1st place, gold medalist(s)				
2017	National Games of China	?	?	?		2nd place, silver medalist(s)
2018	National Championships	1st place, gold medalist(s)	1st place, gold medalist(s)	1st place, gold medalist(s)		
2018	Asian Games		1	1		1st place, gold medalist(s)
2019	National Championships	1st place, gold medalist(s)		1st place, gold medalist(s)		
2019	World Championships		1st place, gold medalist(s)		( (gold) )	
2020	did not compete due to COVID-19 pandemic					
2021	National Games of China	1	2	1		1st place, gold medalist(s)
2022	World Games		1	1		1st place, gold medalist(s)
2023	World Combat Games		1	1		1st place, gold medalist(s)

== See also ==
- List of Asian Games medalists in wushu
- China national wushu team
