= Tomohiro Araya =

Japanese wushu practitioner

Personal information
- Born: October 22, 1994 (age 31)
- Height: 174 cm (5 ft 9 in)
- Weight: 64 kg (141 lb)

Sport
- Sport: Wushu
- Events: Taijiquan, Taijijian
Medal record
Representing Japan
Men's Wushu Taolu
World Games
Silver medal – second place	2025 Chengdu	Taijiquan+Taijijian
World Championships
Gold medal – first place	2017 Kazan	Taijijian
Silver medal – second place	2015 Jakarta	Taijiquan
Silver medal – second place	2015 Jakarta	Taijijian
Bronze medal – third place	2017 Kazan	Taijiquan
Bronze medal – third place	2023 Fort Worth	Taijiquan
Bronze medal – third place	2023 Fort Worth	Taijijian
Bronze medal – third place	2025 Brasília	Taijijian
World Cup
Gold medal – first place	2016 Fuzhou	Taijijian
Silver medal – second place	2024 Yokohama	Taijiquan
Silver medal – second place	2024 Yokohama	Taijijian
Bronze medal – third place	2016 Fuzhou	Taijiquan
Asian Games
Silver medal – second place	2018 Jakarta-Palembang	Taijiquan
Asian Championships
Gold medal – first place	2024 Macau	Taijijian
Silver medal – second place	2016 Taoyuan	Taijijian
Silver medal – second place	2024 Macau	Taijiquan Pair
Asian Cup
Gold medal – first place	2025 Songyuan	Taijiquan Pair
Silver medal – second place	2025 Songyuan	Taijijian
World Junior Championships
Silver medal – second place	2012 Macau	Taijiquan A
Bronze medal – third place	2012 Macau	Taijijian A
Bronze medal – third place	2010 Singapore	Taijijian A

Tomohiro Araya (Japanese: 荒谷 友碩; born October 22, 1994) is a taijiquan athlete from Japan.

== Career ==
Tomohiro competed in the 2010 and 2012 World Junior Wushu Championships winning three medals.

Tomohiro made his international senior debut at the 2015 World Wushu Championships where he was a double silver medalist. This qualified him for the 2016 Taolu World Cup where he won a gold medal in taijijian and a bronze medal in taijiquan. A year later, he was the world champion in taijijian and a bronze medalist in taijiquan at the 2017 World Wushu Championships. At the 2018 Asian Games, he won the silver medal in men's taijiquan, earning the only medal for Japan in wushu at the games.

At the 2023 World Wushu Championships, Tomohiro won bronze medals in taijiquan and taijijian. Several months later, he became the Asian champion in taijijian and won a silver medal in taijiquan doubles at the 2024 Asian Wushu Championships. He then won silver medals in taijiquan and taijijian at the 2024 Taolu World Cup. A year later, he won the gold medal in taijiquan pair and the silver medal in taijijian at the 2025 Taolu Asian Cup.

== See also ==
- List of Asian Games medalists in wushu
