= Wang Di (wushu) =

Chinese wushu practitioner

Personal information
- Born: 1993 (age 32–33) Hangzhou, Zhejiang, China

Sport
- Sport: Wushu
- Event(s): Nanquan, Nandao, Nangun
Medal record
Representing China
Men's Wushu Taolu
World Championships
| Gold medal – first place | 2015 Jakarta | Nanquan |
World Cup
| Gold medal – first place | 2016 Fuzhou | Nanquan |
Asian Games
| Gold medal – first place | 2014 Incheon | Nanquan |

Wang Di (Chinese: 王地; pinyin: Wáng de; born 1993) is a retired professional wushu taolu athlete from China. He is a one-time world champion and gold medalist at the 2016 Taolu World Cup and the 2014 Asian Games. He won the gold medal in the nanquan all-around event at the 2017 National Games of China as well as the title, "The King of Routines." After his competitive career, Wang became a physical education teacher at Zhejiang University.

== See also ==
- List of Asian Games medalists in wushu
