= Wushu at the 2018 Asian Games – Men's daoshu & gunshu =

Men's daoshu & gunshu at the 2018 Asian Games
- Venue: Jakarta International Expo
- Dates: 20–21 August 2018
- Competitors: 10 from 10 nations

Medalists
gold medal	Wu Zhaohua	China
silver medal	Cho Seung-jae	South Korea
bronze medal	Achmad Hulaefi	Indonesia

The men's daoshu / gunshu all-round competition at the 2018 Asian Games in Jakarta, Indonesia was held from 20 August to 21 August at the JIExpo Kemayoran Hall B3.

== Schedule ==
All times are Western Indonesia Time (UTC+07:00)

Date	Time	Event
Monday, 20 August 2018	09:00	Daoshu
Tuesday, 21 August 2018	09:00	Gunshu

== Results ==
Rank	Athlete	Daoshu	Gunshu	Total
1st place, gold medalist(s)	Wu Zhaohua (CHN)	9.76	9.76	19.52
2nd place, silver medalist(s)	Cho Seung-jae (KOR)	9.72	9.73	19.45
3rd place, bronze medalist(s)	Achmad Hulaefi (INA)	9.70	9.71	19.41
4	Jowen Lim (SGP)	9.70	9.70	19.40
5	Hibiki Betto (JPN)	9.67	9.70	19.37
6	Lau Tsz Hong (HKG)	9.68	9.68	19.36
7	Wang Chen-ming (TPE)	9.69	9.35	19.04
8	Chirag Sharma (IND)	9.65	9.39	19.04
9	Sujinda Yangrungrawin (THA)	9.43	9.56	18.99
10	Wu Nok In (MAC)	9.41	9.38	18.79
