= Hoàng Thị Phương Giang =

Vietnamese wushu practitioner

Sport
- Sport: Wushu
- Events: Changquan, Daoshu, Gunshu
Medal record
Representing Vietnam
Women's wushu taolu
World Championships
Silver medal – second place	2011 Ankara	Gunshu
Silver medal – second place	2013 Kuala Lumpur	Daoshu
Bronze medal – third place	2011 Ankara	Gunshu
Bronze medal – third place	2019 Shanghai	Gunshu
Bronze medal – third place	2023 Fort Worth	Daoshu
World Cup
Bronze medal – third place	2016 Fuzhou	Gunshu
Bronze medal – third place	2018 Yangon	Gunshu
Asian Games
Bronze medal – third place	2018 Jakarta-Palembang	Changquan
Asian Championships
Silver medal – second place	2012 Macau	Daoshu
Silver medal – second place	2012 Macau	Duilian
Southeast Asian Games
Gold medal – first place	2013 Naypyidaw	Changquan
Gold medal – first place	2022 Hanoi	Changquan
Gold medal – first place	2017 Kuala Lumpur	Gunshu
Bronze medal – third place	2011 Jakarta	Changquan
Bronze medal – third place	2022 Hanoi	Daoshu+Gunshu
Bronze medal – third place	2023 Phnom Penh	Daoshu+Gunshu
World Junior Championships
Gold medal – first place	2010 Singapore	Daoshu A
Gold medal – first place	2010 Singapore	Duilian A
Bronze medal – third place	2010 Singapore	Gunshu A

Hoàng Thị Phương Giang is a wushu taolu athlete from Vietnam. She made her international junior debut with gold medals in daoshu and duilian, and a bronze medal in gunshu at the 2010 World Junior Wushu Championships. She then made her international senior debut with a bronze medal victory at the 2011 Southeast Asian Games. Her most notable victories include a bronze medal in women's changquan at the 2018 Asian Games, and gold medals in the 2013 and 2017 Southeast Asian Games. Hoàng is also a five-time medalist in the World Wushu Championships, double bronze medalist in the Taolu World Cup, and double silver medalist in the Asian Wushu Championships.
