= 2013 East Asian Games =

Multi-sport event

VI East Asian Games
- Host city: Tianjin
- Teams: 9
- Opening: October 6, 2013
- Closing: October 15, 2013
- Opened by: Vice Premier Liu Yandong
- Main venue: Tianjin Olympic Center Stadium

The 2013 East Asian Games (6–15 October 2013), officially known as the VI East Asian Games, was an international multi-sport event held in Tianjin, China. 2,422 Athletes from nine East Asian nations competed in 254 events in 24 sports.

Tianjin 2013 is the last edition of East Asian Games before being replaced by East Asian Youth Games.

== Organisation ==
=== Bid ===
In 2007, China and Mongolia entered the bidding process as potential host cities for the 6th East Asian games.

== Participation ==
- China
- Chinese Taipei
- Guam
- Hong Kong
- Japan
- North Korea
- South Korea
- Macau
- Mongolia

=== Sports ===
2013 East Asian Games featured 258 events in 24 sports (including 16 Olympics sports), a new record of East Asian Games history.

- Aquatics (50)
  - Swimming (40)
  - Diving (10)
- Athletics (46)
- Badminton (7)
- Baseball (1) †
- Basketball (2)
- Bowling (12) †
- Cycling (10)
  - Road Cycling (3)
  - BMX (2)
  - Indoor Cycling (5)
- DanceSport (12) †
- Dragon boat (4) †
- Fencing (12)
- Football (2)
- Gymnastics (14)
- Field hockey (2)
- Judo (14)
- Karate (12) †
- Shooting (4)
- Soft tennis (7) †
- Squash (7) †
- Table tennis (7)
- Taekwondo (13)
- Tennis (5)
- Volleyball (2)
- Weightlifting (5)
- Wushu (19) †
  - Taolu (12)
  - Sanda (8)

NB: † = Non-Olympic sports

== Medal table ==
Key: Final medal tally, from the official Medal Tally page.

* Host nation (China)

Rank	Nation	Gold	Silver	Bronze	Total
1	China (CHN)*	134	79	51	264
2	Japan (JPN)	47	57	75	179
3	South Korea (KOR)	36	51	74	161
4	Chinese Taipei (TPE)	17	28	46	91
5	Hong Kong (HKG)	10	16	30	56
6	North Korea (PRK)	8	12	22	42
7	Macau (MAC)	3	5	19	27
8	Mongolia (MGL)	0	4	18	22
9	Guam (GUM)	0	1	0	1
Totals (9 entries)		255	253	335	843
