= Qiang (spear) =

Chinese term for spear

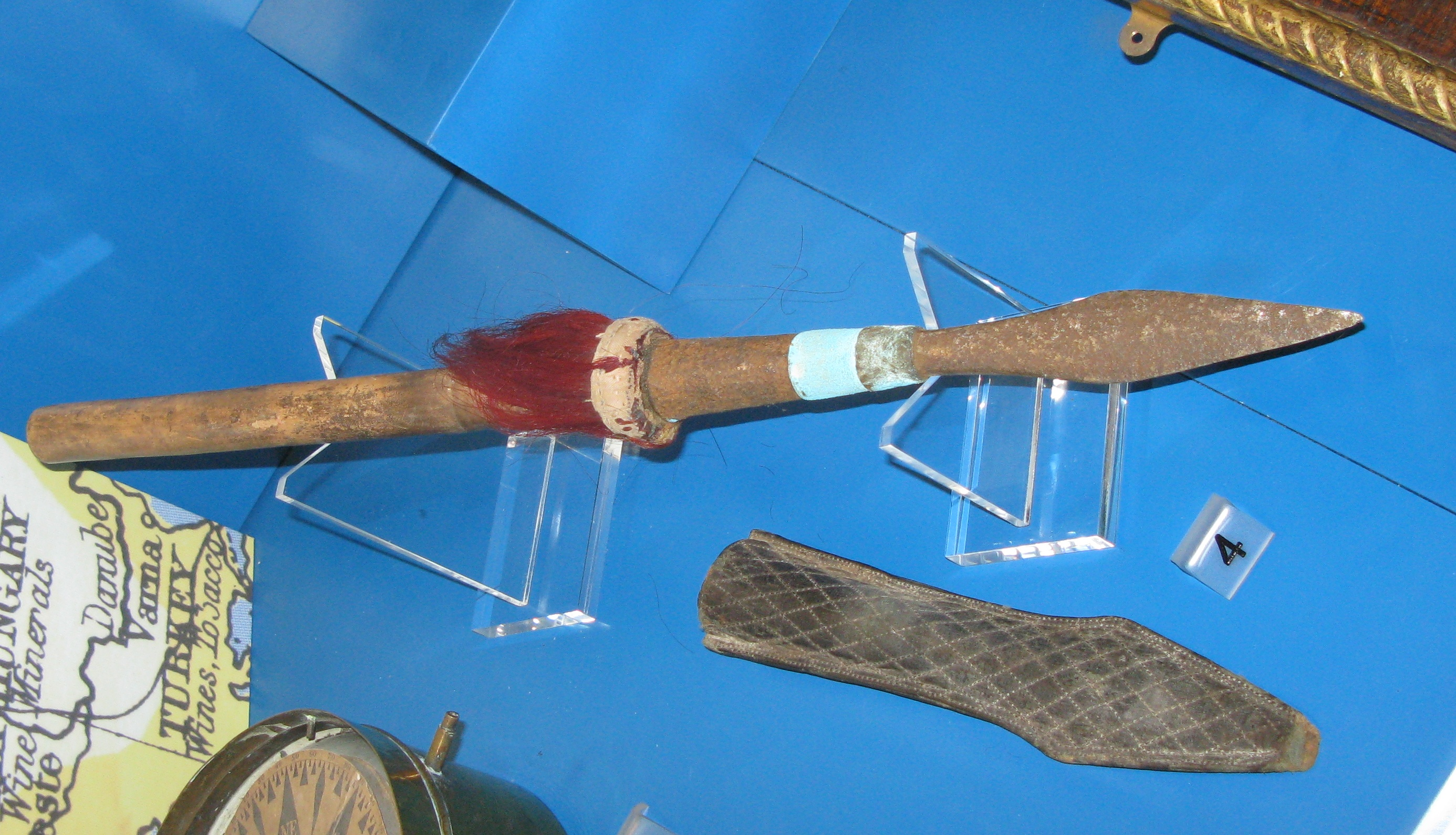

Chinese name
- Traditional Chinese: 槍
- Simplified Chinese: 枪
Transcriptions
Standard Mandarin
- Hanyu Pinyin: chēng, qiāng
- Wade–Giles: ch'eng1, ch'iang1
Yue: Cantonese
- Jyutping: coeng1

Vietnamese name
- Vietnamese alphabet: thương
- Chữ Hán: 槍

Korean name
- Hangul: 창
- Hanja: 槍
Transcriptions
- Revised Romanization: chang,chaeng
- McCune–Reischauer: ch'ang, chaeng

Japanese name
- Kanji: 槍
- Kana: やり
Transcriptions
- Romanization: yari

Qiang (pronunciation: [tɕʰjáŋ], English approximation: /tʃjɑːŋ/ chyahng, simplified Chinese: 枪; traditional Chinese: 槍; pinyin: qiāng; Jyutping: coeng1) is a Chinese term for spear. Due to its relative ease of manufacture, the spear in many variations was ubiquitous on the pre-modern Chinese battlefield. It is known as one of the four major weapons, along with the gun (staff), dao (sabre), and the jian (straight sword), called in this group "The King of Weapons".

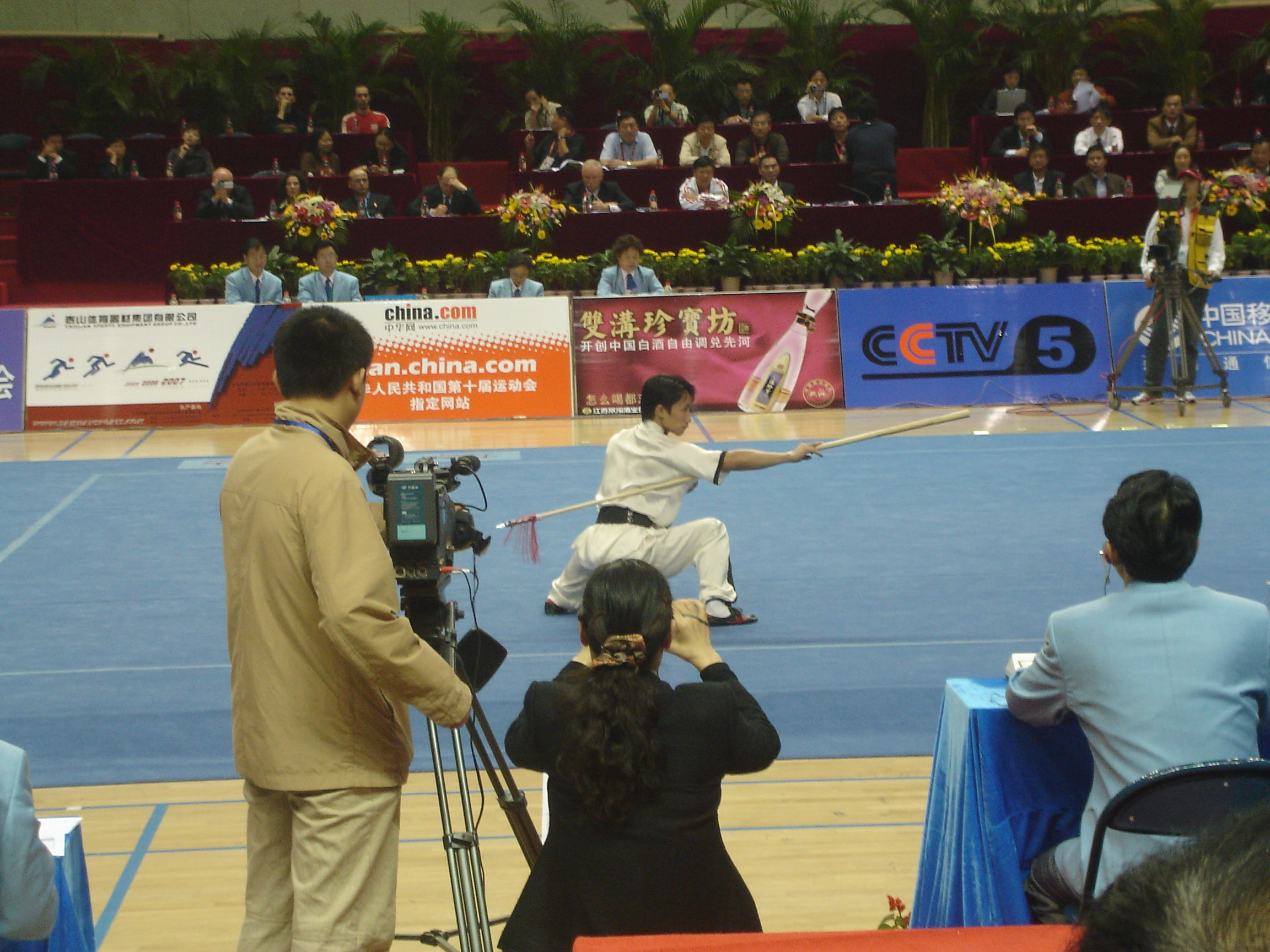
Qiang event at the 10th All China Games

Common features of the Chinese spear are the leaf-shaped blade and red horse-hair tassel lashed below. The tassel shows elite troop status, which also helped it serve a tactical purpose.

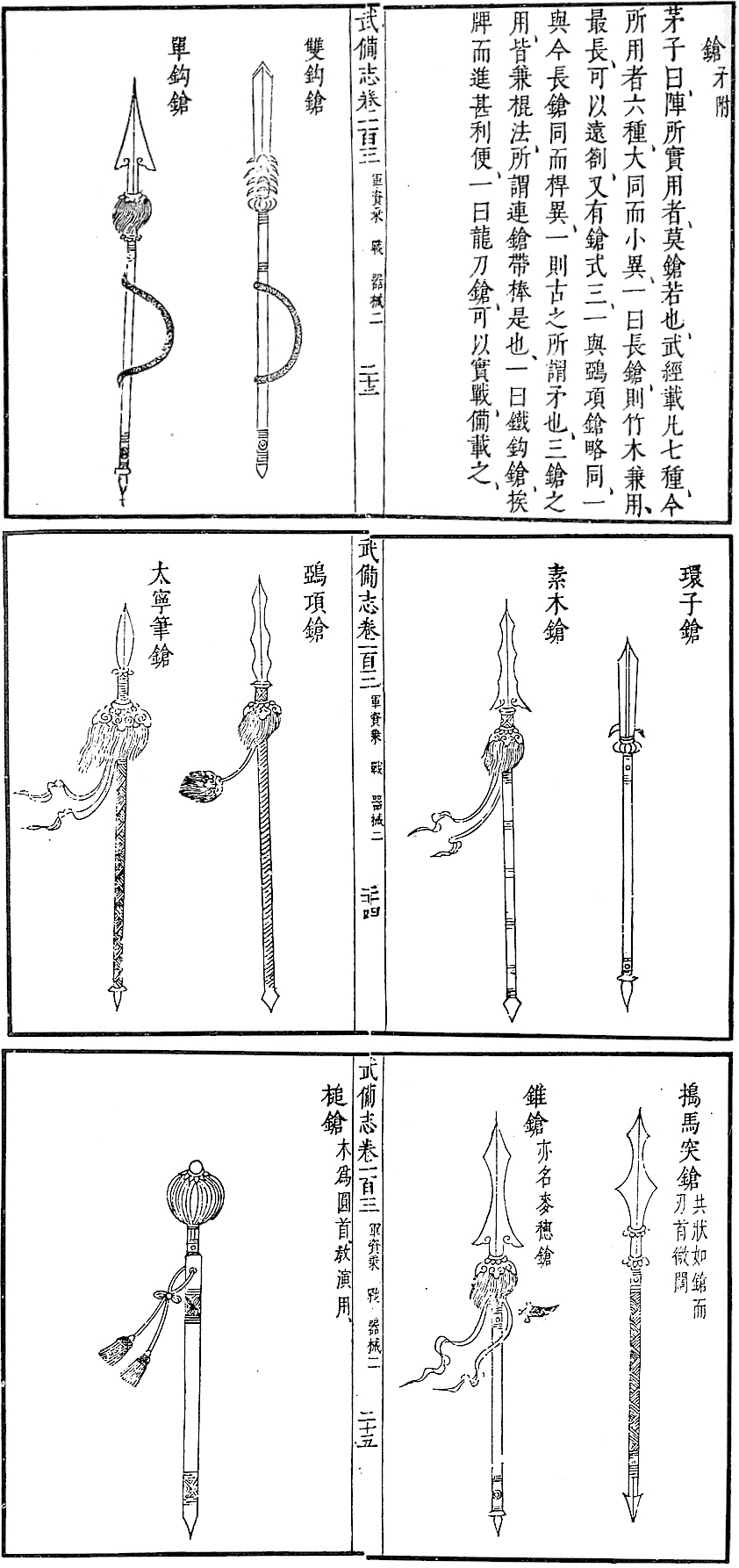
Nine kinds of spears popular in the Song dynasty

The length varied from around 2.5 m (8 ft 2 in) long, up to 6 m (20 ft) in length. According to general Qi Jiguang, the Ming military categorized spears above 2.5 m (8 ft 2 in) as short spears, 4 m (13 ft) as long spears, and spears below 2.5 m (8 ft 2 in) as spiked staffs, which were used more for hitting than stabbing. Spears used in war were typically made of hardwood. Martial arts (wushu) spears are typically made of wax wood, a lighter and more flexible wood better suited for performance; these are called flower spears.

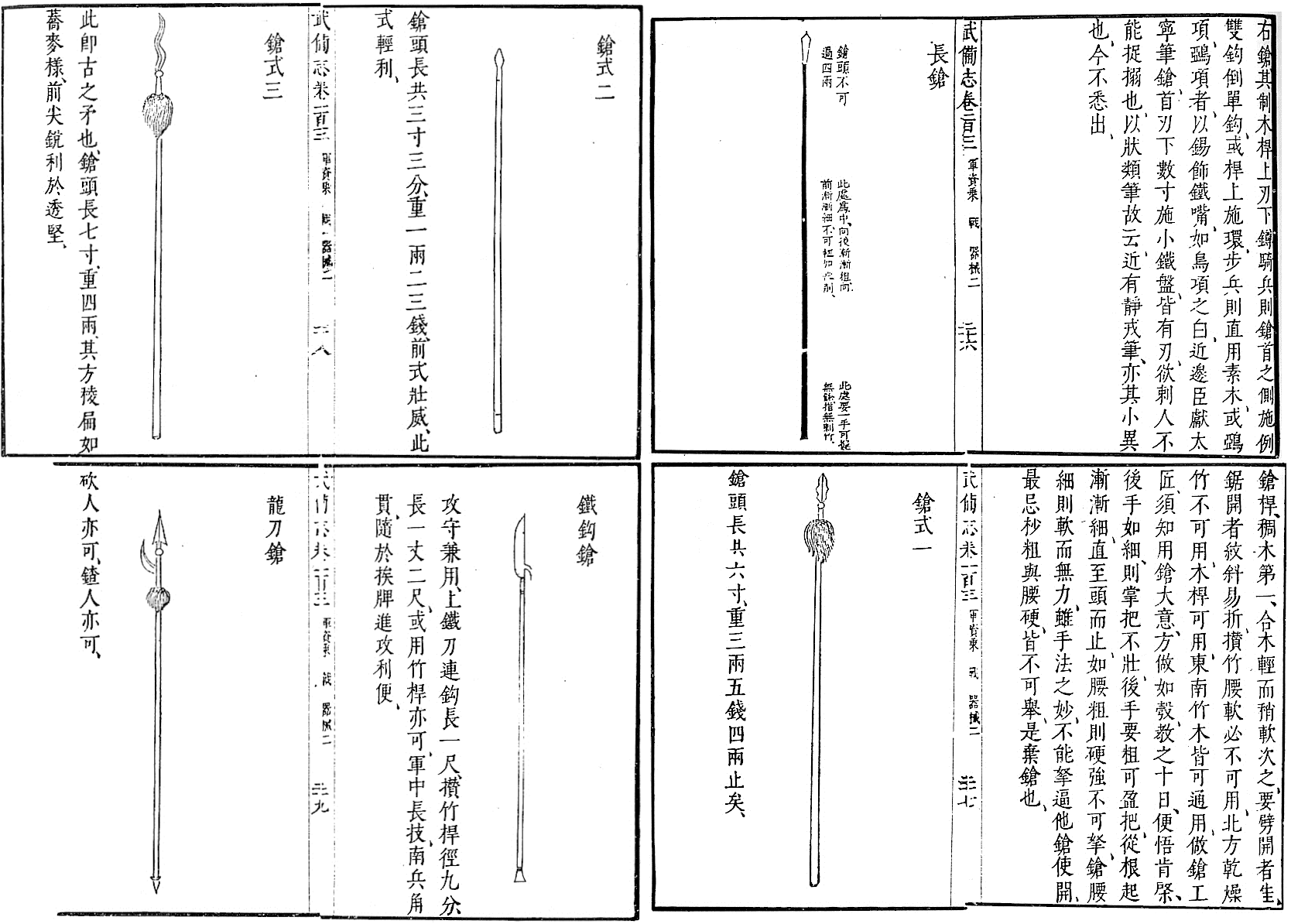
Six kinds of spears popular in the Ming dynasty

Many Chinese martial arts feature spear training in their curriculum. The conditioning provided by the spear technique is seen as invaluable, and in many styles it is the first weapons training introduced to students. Moreover, some schools of empty-handed fighting in China credit the spear technique as their foundation, notably Xingyiquan and Bajiquan.

== See also ==
- Spear of Fuchai
- Guandao
