= Wushu at the 2009 National Games of China =

Wushu Taolu at the 2009 National Games of China
- Venue: Binzhou Olympic Sports Park Gymnasium (capacity: 7,000)
- Location: Binzhou, Shandong, China
- Dates: October 12-14, 2005
- Website: Official Website (Archived)

The wushu taolu competition at the 2009 National Games of China was held from October 12-14, 2009, at the Binzhou Olympic Sports Park Gymnasium (Chinese: 滨州奥体公园体育馆进行) in Binzhou, Shandong, China.

== Results ==
=== Medal table ===
Rank	Delegation	Gold	Silver	Bronze	Total
1	Shandong	3	0	2	5
2	Beijing	1	2	0	3
3	Tianjin	1	1	1	3
4	Fujian	1	0	2	3
5	Guangdong	1	0	1	2
6	Anhui	1	0	0	1
6	Jiangxi	1	0	0	1
6	PLA	1	0	0	1
6	Shanghai	1	0	0	1
6	Zhejiang	1	0	0	1
11	Shanxi	0	2	1	3
12	Henan	0	1	3	4
13	Gansu	0	1	0	1
13	Guangxi	0	1	0	1
13	Hebei	0	1	0	1
13	Jiangsu	0	1	0	1
13	Ningxia	0	1	0	1
13	Shaanxi	0	1	0	1
19	Liaoning	0	0	1	1
19	Sichuan	0	0	1	1
Totals (20 entries)		12	12	12	36

=== Medalists ===
==== Men ====
Event	Gold	Silver	Bronze
Changquan	Zhao Qingjian; Beijing	Yuan Xiaochao; Shanxi	Sun Peiyuan; Shandong
Daoshu+Gunshu	Lu Yongxu; Shandong	Yuan Xiaochao; Shanxi	Sun Peiyuan; Shandong
Jianshu+Qiangshu	Wei Jian; Shanghai	Zhao Kun; Henan	Su Baocheng; Tianjin
Nanquan+Nangun	Huang Guangyuan; Guangdong	Ou Xiasheng; Guangxi	Li Fukui; Sichuan
Taijiquan+Taijijian	Zhou Bin; Fujian	Wu Yanan; Shaanxi	Huang Yingqi; Fujian
Duilian	Jiangxi; Shi Longlong; Wu Xiaolong	Ningxia; Huang Baoguang; Zuo Changhui; Ma Jinwen	Chongqing; Han Jincan; Wang Chao; Wang Mingqiang

==== Women ====
Event	Gold	Silver	Bronze
Changquan	Cao Jing; Shandong	Liu Xiaolei; Beijing	Ma Lan; Henan
Daoshu+Gunshu	Cao Jing; Shandong	Liu Xiaolei; Beijing	Ma Lan; Henan
Jianshu+Qiangshu	Ma Lingjuan; Anhui	Kan Wencong; Hebei	Zhao Shi; Shanxi
Nanquan+Nandao	Mao Yaqi; Zhejiang	Wei Hong; Gansu	Lin Xia; Fujian
Taijiquan+Taijijian	Cui Wenjuan; PLA	Yu Mengmeng; Tianjin	Wu Xueqin; Hubei
Duilian	Tianjin; Feng Kaijie; Zhang Xinyi; Liu Xiaohui	Jiangsu; Zhang Li; Ji Taijing; Shen Guangmei	Liaoning; Yan Xiaole; Li Lin; Xu Qige
