= Wushu at the 2010 Asian Games – Women's nanquan & nandao =

Women's nanquan & nandao at the 2010 Asian Games
- Venue: Nansha Gymnasium
- Dates: 13 November 2010
- Competitors: 10 from 9 nations

Medalists
gold medal	Lin Fan	China
silver medal	Ivana Ardelia Irmanto	Indonesia
bronze medal	Tai Cheau Xuen	Malaysia

The women's Nanquan / Nandao all-round competition at the 2010 Asian Games in Guangzhou, China was held on 13 November at the Nansha Gymnasium.

== Schedule ==
All times are China Standard Time (UTC+08:00)

Date	Time	Event
Saturday, 13 November 2010	10:00	Nandao
Saturday, 13 November 2010	14:30	Nanquan

== Results ==
Rank	Athlete	Nandao	Nanquan	Total
1st place, gold medalist(s)	Lin Fan (CHN)	9.90	9.90	19.80
2nd place, silver medalist(s)	Ivana Ardelia Irmanto (INA)	9.37	9.55	18.92
3rd place, bronze medalist(s)	Tai Cheau Xuen (MAS)	9.24	9.62	18.86
4	Yuen Ka Ying (HKG)	9.54	9.26	18.80
5	Diana Bong (MAS)	8.80	9.66	18.46
6	Lim Sung-eun (KOR)	9.05	9.18	18.23
7	Aint Mi Mi (MYA)	8.51	8.38	16.89
8	Kim Sol-yong (PRK)	7.93	8.61	16.54
9	Faustina Woo (BRU)	7.60	8.30	15.90
10	Bidhya Maharjan (NEP)	7.30	8.13	15.43
