= Wushu at the 2009 World Games =

- Dates: 16–26 July 2009

The wushu competition at the 2009 World Games was held from July 16 to July 26 at the Kaohsiung County Stadium in Kaohsiung, Taiwan. This was the first time wushu was featured as an invitational sport at the games, with later appearances being in 2013 and 2022.

== Medal summary ==
=== Medal table ===
* Host nation (Chinese Taipei)

Rank	Nation	Gold	Silver	Bronze	Total
1	China	8	0	0	8
2	Russia	2	2	1	5
3	Iran	2	1	1	4
4	Chinese Taipei*	1	3	1	5
5	Vietnam	0	2	2	4
6	Hong Kong	0	2	1	3
6	Japan	0	2	1	3
8	Philippines	0	1	0	1
9	Malaysia	0	0	2	2
10	Indonesia	0	0	1	1
10	South Korea	0	0	1	1
Totals (11 entries)		13	13	11	37

=== Taolu ===
==== Men ====
Event	Gold	Silver	Bronze
Changquan	Yuan Xiaochao; China	Daisuke Ichikizaki; Japan	Semen Udelov; Russia
Daoshu / Gunshu	Zhao Qingjian; China	Cheng Chung Hang; Hong Kong	Trần Đức Trọng; Vietnam
Nanquan / Nangun	Peng Wei-chua; Chinese Taipei	Farshad Arabi; Iran	Ho Mun Hua; Malaysia
Taijiquan / Taijijian	Wu Yanan; China	Hei Zhi Hong; Hong Kong	Lee Yang; Malaysia

Event	Gold	Silver	Bronze
Changquan	Daria Tarasova; Russia	Vũ Trà My; Vietnam	Susyana Tjhan; Indonesia
Jianshu / Qiangshu	Ma Lingjuan; China	Chen Shao-chi; Chinese Taipei	Nguyễn Mai Phương; Vietnam
Nanquan / Nandao	Lin Fan; China	Erika Kojima; Japan	Yuen Ka Ying; Hong Kong
Taijiquan / Taijijian	Cui Wenjuan; China	Fan Man-yun; Chinese Taipei	Ai Miyaoka; Japan

=== Sanda ===
==== Men ====
Event	Gold	Silver	Bronze
56 kg	Duan Hansong; China	Sait Khayrulaev; Russia	None awarded
70 kg	Murad Akhadov; Russia	Chou Ting-yuan; Chinese Taipei	Kim Deuk-su; South Korea
85 kg	Hamid Reza Gholipour; Iran	Muslim Salikhov; Russia	None awarded

==== Women ====
Event	Gold	Silver	Bronze
52 kg	E Meidie; China	Nguyễn Thùy Ngân; Vietnam	Maryam Tavakkoli; Iran
60 kg	Zahra Karimi; Iran	Mariane Mariano; Philippines	Kao Yu-chuan; Chinese Taipei
