= Wushu at the 2006 Asian Games – Women's nanquan combined =

Women's nanquan combined at the 2006 Asian Games
- Venue: Aspire Hall 3
- Dates: 12–14 December 2006
- Competitors: 11 from 9 nations

Medalists
gold medal	Mao Yaqi	China
silver medal	Angie Tsang	Hong Kong
bronze medal	Diana Bong	Malaysia

The women's nanquan three events combined competition (Nanquan, Nandao and Nangun) at the 2006 Asian Games in Doha, Qatar was held from 12 to 14 December at the Aspire Hall 3.

== Schedule ==
All times are Arabia Standard Time (UTC+03:00)

Date	Time	Event
Tuesday, 12 December 2006	12:30	Nanquan
Wednesday, 13 December 2006	09:00	Nangun
Thursday, 14 December 2006	09:00	Nandao

== Results ==
Legend

- DNS — Did not start

Rank	Athlete	Nanquan	Nangun	Nandao	Total
1st place, gold medalist(s)	Mao Yaqi (CHN)	9.84	9.80	9.65	29.29
2nd place, silver medalist(s)	Angie Tsang (HKG)	9.33	9.56	9.70	28.59
3rd place, bronze medalist(s)	Diana Bong (MAS)	9.22	9.50	9.56	28.28
4	Erika Kojima (JPN)	9.04	9.55	9.68	28.27
5	Huang Yan Hui (MAC)	9.17	9.37	9.60	28.14
6	Huang Hsiao-chien (TPE)	9.25	9.00	9.55	27.80
7	Law Sum Yin (HKG)	8.82	9.30	9.52	27.64
8	Jung You-myung (KOR)	8.60	8.90	9.05	26.55
9	Fong Weng Cheng (MAC)	8.30	8.70	9.00	26.00
10	Deng Ying Zhi (SIN)	DNS	9.27	9.05	18.32
11	Bina Lama Khadka (NEP)	DNS	DNS	DNS	0.00
