= Han Jing (wushu) =

Macau wushu practitioner

Personal information
- Born: November 30, 1973 (age 52) China
- Height: 1.62 m (5 ft 4 in)
- Weight: 60 kg (132 lb)

Sport
- Sport: Wushu
- Events: Changquan, Jianshu, Qiangshu
- Team: Beijing Wushu Team (-2000); Macau Wushu Team (2000-2008)
Medal record
Representing Macau
Women's Wushu Taolu
Olympic Games (unofficial)
Silver medal – second place	2008 Beijing	Jianshu+Qiangshu
World Championships
Gold medal – first place	2003 Macau	Jianshu
Gold medal – first place	2003 Macau	Duilian
Gold medal – first place	2005 Hanoi	Duilian
Silver medal – second place	2005 Hanoi	Jianshu
Silver medal – second place	2005 Hanoi	Qiangshu
Silver medal – second place	2007 Beijing	Jianshu
Bronze medal – third place	2007 Beijing	Qiangshu
Bronze medal – third place	2007 Beijing	Duilian
Asian Games
Silver medal – second place	2002 Busan	CQ All-Around
Bronze medal – third place	2006 Doha	CQ All-Around
Asian Championships
Gold medal – first place	2004 Yangon	Jianshu
Gold medal – first place	2008 Macau	Duilian
Silver medal – second place	2004 Yangon	Changquan
Silver medal – second place	2008 Macau	Qiangshu
Bronze medal – third place	2004 Yangon	Qiangshu
East Asian Games
Gold medal – first place	2001 Osaka	Changquan
Gold medal – first place	2005 Macau	Changquan
Silver medal – second place	2005 Macau	Jianshu+Qiangshu

Han Jing (Chinese: 韓靜; pinyin: Hán jìng; born November 30, 1973) is a retired professional wushu taolu athlete who represented Macau.

== Career ==
Han was originally a member of the Beijing Wushu Team and was transferred to Macau in 2000. Han's first medal she received in international competition was at the 2001 East Asian Games where she won the gold medal in the women's changquan combined event. A year later at the 2002 Asian Games, Han won the silver medal in women's changquan. She then competed at the 2003 World Wushu Championships in Macau and became the world champion in jianshu, thus winning the first gold medal for the Macau SAR after its return to China. Han also won a gold medal in duilian and at the 2005 World Wushu Championships, she won gold in the same event. Later that year, she competed in the 2005 East Asian Games where she won a gold medal in changquan and a silver medal in jianshu and qiangshu combined. A year later, Han was the flag-bearer for Macau at the 2006 Asian Games and won the bronze medal in women's changquan.

At the 2007 World Wushu Championships, Han was a triple medalist, winning a silver medal in jianshu and two bronze medals in qiangshu and duilian. This qualified her for the 2008 Beijing Wushu Tournament, where she won the silver medal in the women's jianshu and qiangshu event. Han subsequently retired from competition.

== Awards ==
Awarded by the SAR of Macau:

- Honourific Title of Merit (2001)

== See also ==
- List of Asian Games medalists in wushu
