= Wushu at the 2010 Asian Games – Women's taijiquan & taijijian =

Women's taijiquan & taijijian at the 2010 Asian Games
- Venue: Nansha Gymnasium
- Dates: 15 November 2010
- Competitors: 12 from 9 nations

Medalists
gold medal	Chai Fong Ying	Malaysia
silver medal	Ai Miyaoka	Japan
bronze medal	Wen Ching-ni	Chinese Taipei

The women's taijiquan and taijijian all-round competition at the 2010 Asian Games in Guangzhou, China was held on 15 November at the Nansha Gymnasium.

== Schedule ==
All times are China Standard Time (UTC+08:00)

Date	Time	Event
Monday, 15 November 2010	10:00	Taijijian
Monday, 15 November 2010	16:00	Taijiquan

== Results ==
Rank	Athlete	Taijijian	Taijiquan	Total
1st place, gold medalist(s)	Chai Fong Ying (MAS)	9.67	9.69	19.36
2nd place, silver medalist(s)	Ai Miyaoka (JPN)	9.67	9.67	19.34
3rd place, bronze medalist(s)	Wen Ching-ni (TPE)	9.65	9.68	19.33
4	Ho Si Hang (MAC)	9.64	9.63	19.27
5	Ng Shin Yii (MAS)	9.56	9.66	19.22
6	Lindswell Kwok (INA)	9.67	9.43	19.10
7	Valerie Wee (SIN)	9.57	9.46	19.03
8	Chen Yi-ying (TPE)	9.27	9.66	18.93
9	Tao Yi Jun (SIN)	9.50	9.27	18.77
10	Kim Ok-jin (KOR)	9.27	9.43	18.70
11	Binita Maharjan (NEP)	8.28	8.58	16.86
12	Olga Karmazina (UZB)	7.90	7.50	15.40
