= Wushu at the 2014 Asian Games – Women's taijiquan & taijijian =

Women's taijiquan & taijijian at the 2014 Asian Games
- Venue: Ganghwa Dolmens Gymnasium
- Dates: 22 September 2014
- Competitors: 13 from 11 nations

Medalists
gold medal	Yu Mengmeng	China
silver medal	Lindswell Kwok	Indonesia
bronze medal	Ai Uchida	Japan

The women's taijiquan and taijijian all-round competition at the 2014 Asian Games in Incheon, South Korea was held on 22 September at the Ganghwa Dolmens Gymnasium.

== Schedule ==
All times are Korea Standard Time (UTC+09:00)

Date	Time	Event
Monday, 22 September 2014	09:00	Taijijian
Monday, 22 September 2014	14:00	Taijiquan

== Results ==
Rank	Athlete	Taijijian	Taijiquan	Total
1st place, gold medalist(s)	Yu Mengmeng (CHN)	9.75	9.75	19.50
2nd place, silver medalist(s)	Lindswell Kwok (INA)	9.68	9.69	19.37
3rd place, bronze medalist(s)	Ai Uchida (JPN)	9.65	9.66	19.31
4	Vera Tan (SIN)	9.60	9.60	19.20
5	Chen Yi-ying (TPE)	9.64	9.54	19.18
6	Ng Shin Yii (MAS)	9.53	9.63	19.16
7	Valerie Wee (SIN)	9.49	9.59	19.08
8	Trần Thị Minh Huyền (VIE)	9.51	9.51	19.02
9	Kim Ok-jin (KOR)	9.25	9.62	18.87
10	Hamideh Barkhor (IRI)	8.33	9.13	17.46
11	Sabita Rai (NEP)	7.84	8.41	16.25
12	Poukky (LAO)	6.42	6.22	12.64
13	Kaying Chang (LAO)	5.92	6.22	12.14
