= Al-Ashwal =

al Ashwal (Arabic: الأشول) is a Yemenite Arabic surname. Notable people with the surname include:

- Ahmed Ali al-Ashwal (born 1949), Yemeni Army General
- Mohammed Al-Ashwal (born 1983), Yemeni Wushu martial artist
