= 2008 Beijing Wushu Tournament – Men's changquan =

Martial arts competition in Beijing

Men's changquan at the 2008 Beijing Wushu Tournament
- Venue: Olympic Sports Center Gymnasium
- Dates: 22 August
- Competitors: 10 from 10 nations

Medalists
gold medal	Yuan Xiaochao	China
silver medal	Semen Udelov	Russia
bronze medal	Ehsan Peighambari	Iran

The men's changquan competition at the 2008 Beijing Wushu Tournament was held on August 22 at the Olympic Sports Center Gymnasium.

== Background ==
The favorite of the competition, Yuan Xiaochao, had been undefeated in changquan in international competitions since 2005 which included gold medal victories at the World Wushu Championships, the Asian Games, and at the East Asian Games. Aung Si Thu and Ang Eng Chong were also projected favorites as they were the silver and bronze medalists respectively at the 2007 World Wushu Championships.

At the Beijing Wushu Tournament, Yuan Xiaochao clearly dominated the competition with a wide margin and thus won the gold medal. The silver medalist Semen Udelov and bronze medalist Ehsan Peighambari impressed with their performances as Udelov ranked 7th and Peighambari ranked 24th at the 2007 World Wushu Championships. Both athletes were also selected through the wild card process by Russia and Iran respectively since they did not originally qualify by placing in the top six. Daisuke Ichikizaki, who was another close contender, missed the silver medal due to a 0.1 deduction.

== Schedule ==
All times are Beijing Time (UTC+08:00)

Date	Time	Event
Friday, 22 August 2008	09:30	Final

== Results ==
The event was judged with the degree of difficulty component.

Rank	Athlete	Score
1st place, gold medalist(s)	Yuan Xiaochao (CHN)	9.83
2nd place, silver medalist(s)	Semen Udelov (RUS)	9.63
3rd place, bronze medalist(s)	Ehsan Peighambari (IRI)	9.59
4	Daisuke Ichikizaki (JPN)	9.58
5	Aung Si Thu (MYA)	9.37
6	Siow Kin Yan (SIN)	9.32
7	Andrie Mulianto (INA)	9.29
8	Ang Eng Chong (MAS)	9.25
9	Nicholas Grimwood (NZL)	7.75
10	Emrullah Gul (TUR)	7.27
