= 2011 World Wushu Championships =

11th edition of the World Wushu Championships

- Venue: Ankara Arena
- Location: Ankara, Turkey
- Dates: 9–14 October 2011

The 2011 World Wushu Championships was the 11th edition of the World Wushu Championships. It was held at the Ankara Arena in Ankara, Turkey from October 9 to October 14, 2011. This competition was also the qualifier for the 2013 World Combat Games and the 2013 World Games.

== Medal table ==
* Host nation (Turkey)

Rank	Nation	Gold	Silver	Bronze	Total
1	China	19	0	0	19
2	Iran	6	2	3	11
3	Hong Kong	3	6	2	11
4	Russia	2	4	4	10
5	Philippines	2	2	4	8
6	Macau	2	2	3	7
7	Turkey*	1	4	2	7
8	Vietnam	1	3	6	10
9	Malaysia	1	2	4	7
10	Japan	1	2	3	6
11	South Korea	1	0	7	8
12	Singapore	1	0	0	1
13	India	0	2	2	4
13	Indonesia	0	2	2	4
13	United States	0	2	2	4
16	Ukraine	0	2	0	2
17	Egypt	0	1	3	4
18	Romania	0	1	1	2
19	Armenia	0	1	0	1
19	Italy	0	1	0	1
19	Spain	0	1	0	1
22	France	0	0	4	4
23	Algeria	0	0	2	2
23	Canada	0	0	2	2
25	Bermuda	0	0	1	1
25	Chinese Taipei	0	0	1	1
25	Czech Republic	0	0	1	1
25	Poland	0	0	1	1
25	Sweden	0	0	1	1
25	Venezuela	0	0	1	1
Totals (30 entries)		40	40	62	142

== Medalists ==
=== Men's taolu ===
Event	Gold	Silver	Bronze
Changquan	Zhang Kai; China	Jia Rui; Macau	Colvin Wang; United States
Daoshu	Sun Peiyuan; China	Jia Rui; Macau	Lee Jong-chan; South Korea
Gunshu	Jia Rui; Macau	Nguyễn Mạnh Quyền; Vietnam	Daisuke Ichikizaki; Japan
Gunshu	Jia Rui; Macau	Nguyễn Mạnh Quyền; Vietnam	Ng Say Yoke; Malaysia
Jianshu	Chu Chi Wai; Macau	Colvin Wang; United States	Charles Sutanto; Indonesia
Qiangshu	Su Baocheng; China	Colvin Wang; United States	Chen Riquo; Hong Kong
Nanquan	Huang Guangyuan; China	He Jingde; Hong Kong	Lee Seung-kuen; South Korea
Nandao	Kim Tae-ho; South Korea	He Jingde; Hong Kong	Lee Seung-kuen; South Korea
Nangun	He Jingde; Hong Kong	Farshad Arabi; Iran	Koki Nakata; Japan
Taijiquan	Nguyễn Thanh Tùng; Vietnam	Yoshihiro Sekiya; Japan	Lee Jae-hyung; South Korea
Taijijian	Wu Yanan; China	Jack Loh; Malaysia	Daniel Parantac; Philippines
Duilian	Hong Kong; Leung Ka Wai; Tang Siu Kong; Cheng Chung Hang	Iran; Mohsen Ahmadi; Ebrahim Fathi; Navid Makvandi	Vietnam; Trần Xuân Hiệp; Nguyễn Mạnh Quyền; Nguyễn Huy Thành

=== Women's taolu ===
Event	Gold	Silver	Bronze
Changquan	Zhao Shi; China	Geng Xiaoling; Hong Kong	Zheng Tianhui; Hong Kong
Daoshu	Cheng Cheng; China	Geng Xiaoling; Hong Kong	Daria Tarasova; Russia
Gunshu	Geng Xiaoling; Hong Kong	Daria Tarasova; Russia	Hoàng Thị Phương Giang; Vietnam
Gunshu	Geng Xiaoling; Hong Kong	Daria Tarasova; Russia	Chai Fong Wei; Malaysia
Jianshu	Kan Wencong; China	Zheng Tianhui; Hong Kong	Dương Thúy Vi; Vietnam
Qiangshu	Elif Akyüz; Turkey	Zheng Tianhui; Hong Kong	Nguyễn Mai Phương; Vietnam
Nanquan	Lin Fan; China	Diana Bong; Malaysia	Tan Dong Mei; Macau
Nandao	Tatiana Ivshina; Russia	Dessy Indri Astuti; Indonesia	Lim Sung-eun; South Korea
Nangun	Erika Kojima; Japan	Tatiana Ivshina; Russia	Diana Bong; Malaysia
Nangun	Erika Kojima; Japan	Tatiana Ivshina; Russia	Tan Dong Mei; Macau
Taijiquan	Li Xinyu; China	Lindswell Kwok; Indonesia	Ai Miyaoka; Japan
Taijiquan	Li Xinyu; China	Lindswell Kwok; Indonesia	Chai Fong Ying; Malaysia
Taijijian	Chai Fong Ying; Malaysia	Ai Miyaoka; Japan	Lindswell Kwok; Indonesia
Duilian	Singapore; Emily Sin; Tay Yu Juan; Tao Yi Jun	Vietnam; Hoàng Thị Phương Giang; Dương Thúy Vi	Iran; Mitra Abbasi; Mahboubeh Karimi

=== Men's sanda ===
Event	Gold	Silver	Bronze
48 kg	Jessie Aligaga; Philippines	Davit Grigoryan; Armenia	Đoàn Xuân Cường; Vietnam
48 kg	Jessie Aligaga; Philippines	Davit Grigoryan; Armenia	Ahmed Hama; Egypt
52 kg	Dembert Arcita; Philippines	Hoàng Hồng Tú; Vietnam	Seo Jung-woo; South Korea
52 kg	Dembert Arcita; Philippines	Hoàng Hồng Tú; Vietnam	Çağdaş Yıkılmaz; Turkey
56 kg	Li Kang; China	Hüseyin Dündar; Turkey	Benjie Rivera; Philippines
56 kg	Li Kang; China	Hüseyin Dündar; Turkey	Chen Ya-hsuan; Chinese Taipei
60 kg	Wu Qiang; China	Ali Ay; Turkey	Kazbek Mamaev; Russia
60 kg	Wu Qiang; China	Ali Ay; Turkey	Anthony Lim; France
65 kg	Mohsen Mohammadseifi; Iran	Savaş Bekar; Turkey	Pierre Moua; France
65 kg	Mohsen Mohammadseifi; Iran	Savaş Bekar; Turkey	Mark Eddiva; Philippines
70 kg	Sajjad Abbasi; Iran	Ismail Aliev; Russia	Rus Traian Augustin; Romania
70 kg	Sajjad Abbasi; Iran	Ismail Aliev; Russia	Maximillion Chen; United States
75 kg	Ji Haitong; China	Arslan Bektimirov; Russia	Cai Liang Chan; Macau
75 kg	Ji Haitong; China	Arslan Bektimirov; Russia	Javad Aghaei; Iran
80 kg	Muslim Salikhov; Russia	Abdelhamid El-Sayad; Egypt	Nacereddine Zemmal; Canada
80 kg	Muslim Salikhov; Russia	Abdelhamid El-Sayad; Egypt	Abdelhakim Moumou; Algeria
85 kg	Hamid Reza Gholipour; Iran	Dmytro Batok; Ukraine	Abdelkader Chabane; Algeria
85 kg	Hamid Reza Gholipour; Iran	Dmytro Batok; Ukraine	Piotr Strus; Poland
90 kg	Huang Lei; China	Alfonso Valcárcel; Spain	Hisham Abdelhamid; Egypt
90 kg	Huang Lei; China	Alfonso Valcárcel; Spain	Sanjeev Kumar; India
+90 kg	Chen Yanzhao; China	Oleksandr Rudkovskyi; Ukraine	Lee Sang-jung; South Korea
+90 kg	Chen Yanzhao; China	Oleksandr Rudkovskyi; Ukraine	Jermal Woolridge; Bermuda

=== Women's sanda ===
Event	Gold	Silver	Bronze
48 kg	Feng Yufang; China	Yumnam Sanathoi Devi; India	Rhea May Rifani; Philippines
48 kg	Feng Yufang; China	Yumnam Sanathoi Devi; India	Elaheh Mansourian; Iran
52 kg	Qiu Tiao; China	Mary Jane Estimar; Philippines	Funda Tiken; Turkey
52 kg	Qiu Tiao; China	Mary Jane Estimar; Philippines	Sarah Belala; France
56 kg	Liu Lingling; China	Mariane Mariano; Philippines	Nguyễn Thị Oanh; Vietnam
56 kg	Liu Lingling; China	Mariane Mariano; Philippines	Ekaterina Mukhortikova; Russia
60 kg	Jiang Xianting; China	Pooja Kadian; India	Valérie Domergue; France
60 kg	Jiang Xianting; China	Pooja Kadian; India	Maria Olsson; Sweden
65 kg	Maryam Hashemi; Iran	Georgiana Radovicescu; Romania	Ekaterina Vinkovatova; Russia
65 kg	Maryam Hashemi; Iran	Georgiana Radovicescu; Romania	María Cariaco; Venezuela
70 kg	Shahrbanoo Mansourian; Iran	Elif Keleş; Turkey	Veronika Kohutová; Czech Republic
70 kg	Shahrbanoo Mansourian; Iran	Elif Keleş; Turkey	Sherouk Ahmed; Egypt
75 kg	Maliheh Fazli; Iran	Antonia Di Biase; Italy	Vishaka Malik; India
75 kg	Maliheh Fazli; Iran	Antonia Di Biase; Italy	Taryn Laramie; Canada
