= Wushu at the 2014 Asian Games – Men's changquan =

Men's changquan at the 2014 Asian Games
- Venue: Ganghwa Dolmens Gymnasium
- Dates: 20 September 2014
- Competitors: 11 from 10 nations

Medalists
gold medal	Lee Ha-sung	South Korea
silver medal	Jia Rui	Macau
bronze medal	Daisuke Ichikizaki	Japan

The men's changquan competition at the 2014 Asian Games in Incheon, South Korea was held on 20 September at the Ganghwa Dolmens Gymnasium.

== Schedule ==
All times are Korea Standard Time (UTC+09:00)

Date	Time	Event
Saturday, 20 September 2014	09:00	Final

== Results ==
Rank	Athlete	Score
1st place, gold medalist(s)	Lee Ha-sung (KOR)	9.71
2nd place, silver medalist(s)	Jia Rui (MAC)	9.69
3rd place, bronze medalist(s)	Daisuke Ichikizaki (JPN)	9.67
4	Trần Xuân Hiệp (VIE)	9.57
5	Yong Yi Xiang (SIN)	9.55
6	Ehsan Peighambari (IRI)	9.51
7	Chu Chi Wai (MAC)	9.48
8	Chen Riguo (HKG)	9.20
9	Anjul Namdeo (IND)	9.03
10	Maksudbek Bakhodirov (UZB)	8.56
11	Nirajan Ale Magar (NEP)	8.37
