= 2008 Asian Wushu Championships =

7th edition of the Asian Wushu Championships

- Venue: Tap Seac Multi-sports Pavilion (capacity: 4,000)
- Location: Macau, China
- Start date: May 13, 2008
- End date: May 16, 2008
- Competitors: 400 from 20 nations

The 2008 Asian Wushu Championships were the seventh edition of the Asian Wushu Championships. It was held at the Tap Seac Multi-sports Pavilion in Macau, China, from 13 to 16 May, 2008.

== Medal table ==
Taolu only

* Host nation (Macau)

| Rank | Nation | Gold | Silver | Bronze | Total |
|---|---|---|---|---|---|
| 1 | China (CHN) | 13 | 0 | 0 | 13 |
| 2 | Hong Kong (HKG) | 2 | 6 | 6 | 14 |
| 3 | Macau (MAC)* | 2 | 4 | 2 | 8 |
| 4 | Vietnam (VIE) | 1 | 4 | 2 | 7 |
| 5 | Malaysia (MAS) | 1 | 2 | 2 | 5 |
| 6 | Chinese Taipei (TPE) | 1 | 0 | 2 | 3 |
| 6 | Philippines (PHI) | 1 | 0 | 2 | 3 |
| 8 | Myanmar | 1 | 0 | 1 | 2 |
| 9 | Japan (JPN) | 0 | 4 | 0 | 4 |
| 10 | Iran (IRI) | 0 | 1 | 1 | 2 |
| 11 | Singapore (SGP) | 0 | 1 | 0 | 1 |
| 12 | Indonesia (INA) | 0 | 0 | 3 | 3 |
| 13 | South Korea (KOR) | 0 | 0 | 1 | 1 |
| Totals (13 entries) | | 22 | 22 | 22 | 66 |

== Medalists ==
=== Taolu ===
==== Men ====
| Event | Gold | Silver | Bronze |
|---|---|---|---|
| Changquan | Yuan Xiaochao; China | Jia Rui; Macau | Nguyễn Huy Thành; Vietnam |
| Daoshu | Aung Si Thu; Myanmar | Jia Rui; Macau | Cheng Chung Hang; Hong Kong |
| Gunshu | Zhao Qingjian; China | Daisuke Ichikizaki; Japan | Jia Rui; Macau |
| Jianshu | Wei Jian; China | Liu Yang; Hong Kong | Gogi Nebulana; Indonesia |
| Qiangshu | Chu Chi Wai; Macau | Nguyễn Huy Thành; Vietnam | Liu Yang; Hong Kong |
| Nanquan | Huang Guangyuan; China | Phạm Quốc Khánh; Vietnam | Willy Wang; Philippines |
| Nandao | Willy Wang; Philippines | Phạm Quốc Khánh; Vietnam | He Jingde; Hong Kong |
| Nangun | Zhou jing China | He Jingde; Hong Kong | Farshad Arabi; Iran |
| Taijiquan | Wu Yanan; China | Jack Loh; Malaysia | Chen Jun-chi; Chinese Taipei |
| Taijijian | Chen Jun-chi; Chinese Taipei | Goh Qiu Bin; Singapore | Kim Rack-hoi; South Korea |
| Duilian | Hong Kong; Leung Ka Wai; Tang Siu Kong; Cheng Chung Hang | Iran; Mohsen Ahmadi; Ebrahim Fathi; Navid Makvandi | Philippines; Engelbert Addongan john Keithley Chan; Eleazar Jacob |

==== Women ====
| Event | Gold | Silver | Bronze |
|---|---|---|---|
| Changquan | Zhou Chun; China | Geng Xiaoling; Hong Kong | Zheng Tianhui; Hong Kong |
| Daoshu | Cao Jing; China | Geng Xiaoling; Hong Kong | Xi Cheng Qing; Macau |
| Gunshu | Geng Xiaoling; Hong Kong | Xi Cheng Qing; Macau | Chai Fong Wei; Malaysia |
| Jianshu | Ma Lingjuan; China | Vũ Trà My; Vietnam | Sustana; Indonesia |
| Qiangshu | Zhang Chunyan; China | Han Jing; Macau | Vũ Trà My; Vietnam |
| Nanquan | Huang Yanhui; China | Erika Kojima; Japan | Tai Cheau Xuen; Malaysia |
| Nandao | Lin Fan; China | Yuen Ka Ying; Hong Kong | Law Sum Yin; Hong Kong |
| Nangun | Vũ Thùy Linh; Vietnam | Tai Cheau Xuen; Malaysia | Law Sum Yin; Hong Kong |
| Taijiquan | Cui Wenjuan; China | Ai Miyaoka; Japan | Wen Qing-ni; Chinese Taipei |
| Taijijian | Chai Fong Ying; Malaysia | Ai Miyaoka; Japan | Lindswell; Indonesia |
| Duilian | Macau; Huang Yan Hui; Han Jing | Hong Kong; Law Sum Yin; Zhen Tianhui; Yuen Ka Ying | Myanmar; Sandi Oo; That That Naing |
