= Zichen Wang =

Chinese journalist

Zichen Wang (Chinese: 王子辰) is a Chinese writer based in Beijing, China. He is the author of Pekingology, a newsletter focused on China and US-China relations. Wang is also a research fellow and Deputy Secretary-General at the Center for China and Globalization, a think tank in Beijing.

== Early life and education ==
Wang received a bachelor’s degree from Shandong University of Finance and Economics in 2011, and a Master in Public Policy from the School of Public and International Affairs at Princeton University in 2025.

== Career ==
Wang previously worked as a journalist at Xinhua News Agency for over 11 years, including 29 months in Brussels covering the European Union, before October 2022.

His writings have been published in Financial Times, The Guardian and Foreign Policy. He is an editor of Understanding China’s Economy: Challenges, Opportunities and Prospects, a book to be published by Palgrave Macmillan in October 2026.

He is involved in Track II dialogues among scholars and former government officials between China and the U.S.

=== Pekingology and The East is Read ===
In May 2020, Wang founded Pekingology, which translates articles and important speeches from China into English. Wang founded and edits The East is Read, an English-language newsletter on Chinese current affairs. The U.S.-China Business Council has described it and Pekingnology as "two influential English-language newsletters on China’s current affairs from within China."

In 2025, Wang returned to China.
