= 2016 Taolu World Cup =

1st edition of the Taolu World Cup

- Venue: Fuzhou Province Sports Hall
- Location: Fuzhou, Fujian, China
- Start date: November 15, 2016
- End date: November 20, 2016

The 2016 Taolu World Cup was the first edition of the Taolu World Cup. It was held at the Fuzhou Province Sports Hall in Fuzhou, Fujian, China from November 15 to 20, 2016. Athletes qualified for this competition by placing in the top-eight of any taolu individual event at the 2015 World Wushu Championships.

== Medal summary ==
=== Medal table ===
* Host nation (China)

Rank	NOC	Gold	Silver	Bronze	Total
1	China*	7	0	0	7
2	Hong Kong	5	3	1	9
3	Indonesia	4	1	2	7
4	Japan	2	2	4	8
5	Macau	2	2	2	6
6	Malaysia	1	5	2	8
7	Chinese Taipei	1	4	0	5
8	Russia	0	2	1	3
9	Iran	0	1	3	4
10	Vietnam	0	1	2	3
11	Ukraine	0	1	0	1
12	Italy	0	0	2	2
13	India	0	0	1	1
13	Philippines	0	0	1	1
13	Uzbekistan	0	0	1	1
Totals (15 entries)		22	22	22	66

=== Men ===
Event	Gold	Silver	Bronze
Changquan	Sun Peiyuan; China	Achmad Hulaefi; Indonesia	Charles Sutanto; Indonesia
Daoshu	Achmad Hulaefi; Indonesia	Wang Chen-ming; Chinese Taipei	Vladimir Maksimov; Russia
Gunshu	Achmad Hulaefi; Indonesia	Wang Chen-ming; Chinese Taipei	Trần Xuân Hiệp; Vietnam
Jianshu	Wong Weng Son; Malaysia	Pavel Muratov; Russia	Tomoya Okawa; Japan
Qiangshu	Tomoya Okawa; Japan	Chong Ka Seng; Macau	Wong Weng Son; Malaysia
Nanquan	Wang Di; China	Lai Po-wei; Chinese Taipei	Michele Giordano; Italy
Nandao	Liang Yongda; China	Lai Po-wei; Chinese Taipei	Farshad Arabi; Iran
Nangun	Lai Po-wei; Chinese Taipei	Huang Junhua; Macau	Michele Giordano; Italy
Taijiquan	Chen Zhouli; China	Ho Mun Hua; Malaysia	Tomohiro Araya; Japan
Taijijian	Tomohiro Araya; Japan	Samuei Hui; Hong Kong	Fredy Fredy; Indonesia
Duilian	China; Wu Xiaolong; Shi Longlong	Ukraine; Andrii Koval; Dmytro Panasiuk; Roman Reva	Uzbekistan; Maksud Bakhodirov; Nodir Khasanov

=== Women ===
Event	Gold	Silver	Bronze
Changquan	Liu Xuxu; Hong Kong	Zahra Kiani; Iran	Li Yi; Macau
Daoshu	Liu Xuxu; Hong Kong	Sandra Konstantinova; Russia	Hanieh Rajabi; Iran
Gunshu	Liu Xuxu; Hong Kong	Sou Cho Man; Macau	Hoàng Thị Phương Giang; Vietnam
Jianshu	Li Yi; Macau	Dương Thúy Vi; Vietnam	Zahra Kiani; Iran
Qiangshu	Lai Xiaoxiao; China	Ayaka Honda; Japan	Li Yi; Macau
Nanquan	Wei Hailing; China	Yuen Ka Ying; Hong Kong	Erika Kojima; Japan
Nandao	Juwita Niza Wasni; Indonesia	Erika Kojima; Japan	Diana Bong; Malaysia
Nangun	Juwita Niza Wasni; Indonesia	Diana Bong; Malaysia	Erika Kojima; Japan
Taijiquan	Chen Suijin; Hong Kong	Chan Lu Yi; Malaysia	Sanatombi Leimapokpam; India
Taijijian	Chen Suijin; Hong Kong	Chan Lu Yi; Malaysia	Agatha Wong; Philippines
Duilian	Macau; Li Yi; Sou Cho Man	Malaysia; Phoon Eyin; Chai Fong Wei	Hong Kong; Yuen Ka Ying; Liu Xuxu; Zheng Tianhui
