= Wushu at the 2010 Asian Games – Women's jianshu & qiangshu =

Women's jianshu & qiangshu at the 2010 Asian Games
- Venue: Nansha Gymnasium
- Dates: 14 November 2010
- Competitors: 4 from 4 nations

Medalists
gold medal	Kan Wencong	China
silver medal	Zheng Tianhui	Hong Kong
bronze medal	Lee Wen-jung	Chinese Taipei

The women's Jianshu / Qiangshu all-round competition at the 2010 Asian Games in Guangzhou, China was held on 14 November at the Nansha Gymnasium.

== Schedule ==
All times are China Standard Time (UTC+08:00)

Date	Time	Event
Sunday, 14 November 2010	10:00	Jianshu
Sunday, 14 November 2010	16:00	Qiangshu

== Results ==
Rank	Athlete	Jianshu	Qiangshu	Total
1st place, gold medalist(s)	Kan Wencong (CHN)	9.90	9.80	19.70
2nd place, silver medalist(s)	Zheng Tianhui (HKG)	9.73	9.72	19.45
3rd place, bronze medalist(s)	Lee Wen-jung (TPE)	9.69	9.39	19.08
4	Keiko Yamaguchi (JPN)	9.11	9.65	18.76
