= 2008 Beijing Wushu Tournament – Women's nanquan =

Sports event in the 2008 Beijing Olympics

Women's nanquan at the 2008 Beijing Wushu Tournament
- Venue: Olympic Sports Center Gymnasium
- Dates: 21-22 August
- Competitors: 9 from 9 nations

Medalists
gold medal	Lin Fan	China
silver medal	Erika Kojima	Japan
bronze medal	Diana Bong Siong Lin	Malaysia

The women's nanquan / nangun all-around competition at the 2008 Beijing Wushu Tournament was held from August 21 to 22 at the Olympic Sports Center Gymnasium.

== Schedule ==
All times are Beijing Time (UTC+08:00)

Date	Time	Event
Thursday, 21 August 2008	19:30	Nandao
Friday, 22 August 2008	20:32	Nanquan

== Results ==
The nandao event was judged without the degree of difficulty component while the nanquan event was judged with it.

Rank	Athlete	Nandao	Nanquan	Total
1	Lin Fan (CHN)	9.80	9.85	19.65
2	Erika Kojima (JPN)	9.54	9.62	19.16
3	Diana Bong Siong Lin (MAS)	9.44	9.60	19.04
4	Huang Yan Hui (MAC)	9.59	9.42	19.01
5	Law Sum Yin (HKG)	9.49	9.50	18.99
6	Vũ Thùy Linh (VIE)	9.47	9.49	18.96
7	Rachel Margalit (USA)	9.25	9.43	18.68
8	Samantha Tjhia (CAN)	9.45	9.22	18.67
9	Huang Hsiao-Chien (TPE)	9.23	9.40	18.63
