= Wushu at the 2002 Asian Games – Women's changquan combined =

Women's changquan combined at the 2002 Asian Games
- Venue: Minseok Sports Center
- Dates: 10–13 October 2002
- Competitors: 15 from 10 nations

Medalists
gold medal	Li Ao	China
silver medal	Han Jing	Macau
bronze medal	Nguyễn Thị Mỹ Đức	Vietnam

The women's changquan three events combined competition (Changquan, Qiangshu and Jianshu) at the 2002 Asian Games in Busan, South Korea was held from 10 to 13 October at the Dongseo University Minseok Sports Center.

== Schedule ==
All times are Korea Standard Time (UTC+09:00)

Date	Time	Event
Thursday, 10 October 2002	13:00	Qiangshu
Friday, 11 October 2002	10:30	Changquan
Sunday, 13 October 2002	11:30	Jianshu

== Results ==
Legend

- DNS — Did not start

Rank	Athlete	Qiangshu	Changquan	Jianshu	Total
1st place, gold medalist(s)	Li Ao (CHN)	9.36	9.38	9.45	28.19
2nd place, silver medalist(s)	Han Jing (MAC)	9.35	9.30	9.36	28.01
3rd place, bronze medalist(s)	Nguyễn Thị Mỹ Đức (VIE)	9.28	9.33	9.38	27.99
4	Nguyễn Thúy Hiền (VIE)	9.25	9.25	9.31	27.81
4	Yun Sun-kyung (KOR)	9.25	9.26	9.30	27.81
6	Akiko Kawasaki (JPN)	9.16	9.28	9.25	27.69
7	Chong Sao Lan (MAC)	9.15	9.03	9.28	27.46
8	Lo Nga Ching (HKG)	9.28	8.81	9.30	27.39
9	Kaya Yamagishi (JPN)	8.80	9.25	9.26	27.31
10	Nurdiana (INA)	9.15	8.86	9.25	27.26
11	Hiew Siaw Fang (MAS)	9.18	8.63	9.16	26.97
12	Susyana Tjhan (INA)	8.76	8.80	9.26	26.82
13	Jong Yen Lu (MAS)	9.11	8.40	9.16	26.67
14	Janice Hung (PHI)	8.70	8.68	9.01	26.39
15	Chen Hung-fei (TPE)	DNS	DNS	DNS	0.00
