= Wushu at the 2010 World Combat Games =

- Venue: Olympic Sports Center Gymnasium
- Dates: 28-29, August, 2010

The wushu event at the 2010 World Combat Games took place at the Olympic Sports Center Gymnasium. It was held from August 28-29, 2010.

== Medal table ==
Rank	Nation	Gold	Silver	Bronze	Total
1	China (CHN)	7	0	0	7
2	Macau (MAC)	2	0	1	3
3	Russia (RUS)	1	2	3	6
4	Iran (IRN)	1	2	1	4
5	Hong Kong (HKG)	1	2	0	3
6	Indonesia (INA)	1	0	2	3
7	Japan (JPN)	0	3	0	3
8	Malaysia (MAS)	0	2	2	4
9	Turkey (TUR)	0	1	1	2
10	France (FRA)	0	1	0	1
11	Brazil (BRA)	0	0	1	1
11	Egypt (EGY)	0	0	1	1
11	Singapore (SGP)	0	0	1	1
11	Switzerland (SUI)	0	0	1	1
Totals (14 entries)		13	13	14	40

== Medal summary ==
=== Men's taolu ===
Event	Gold	Silver	Bronze
Changquan	Jia Rui; Macau	Daisuke Ichikizaki; Japan	Ng Say Yoke; Malaysia
Daoshu / Gunshu	Lu Yongxu; China	Ehsan Peighambari; Iran	Semen Udelov; Russia
Nanquan / Nangun	Farshad Arabi; Iran	He Jingde; Hong Kong	Ho Mun Hua; Malaysia
Taijiquan / Taijijian	Huang Yingqi; China	Loh Jack Chang; Malaysia	Iao Chon In; Macau

=== Women's taolu ===
Event	Gold	Silver	Bronze
Changquan	Ma Lan; China	Geng Xiaoling; Hong Kong	Susyana Tjhan; Indonesia
Jianshu / Qiangshu	Zheng Tianhui; Hong Kong	Shizuka Morimoto; Japan	Svetlana Zhurkina; Russia
Nanquan / Nandao	Tatiana Ivshina; Russia	Tai Cheau Xuen; Malaysia	Ivana Ardelia Irmanto; Indonesia
Taijiquan / Taijijian	Lindswell Kwok; Indonesia	Ai Miyaoka; Japan	Tao Yi Jun; Singapore

=== Men's sanda ===
Event	Gold	Silver	Bronze
Sanshou 56 kg	Li Haiming; China	Sait Khayrulaev; Russia	Jerônimo Martins; Brazil
Sanshou 56 kg	Li Haiming; China	Sait Khayrulaev; Russia	None awarded
Sanshou 70 kg	Cai Liang Chan; Macau	Ismail Aliev; Russia	Ahmed Ibrahim; Egypt
Sanshou 70 kg	Cai Liang Chan; Macau	Ismail Aliev; Russia	Sajjad Abbasi; Iran
Sanshou 85 kg	Xu Jiaheng; China	Hamid Reza Gholipour; Iran	Oliver Hasler; Switzerland
Sanshou 85 kg	Xu Jiaheng; China	Hamid Reza Gholipour; Iran	Muslim Salikhov; Russia

=== Women's sanda ===
Event	Gold	Silver	Bronze
Sanshou 52 kg	E Meidie; China	Ayşegül Behlivan; Turkey	None awarded
Sanshou 52 kg	E Meidie; China	Ayşegül Behlivan; Turkey	None awarded
Sanshou 60 kg	Wang Guixian; China	Aurélie Nicole; France	Gülşah Kıyak; Turkey
Sanshou 60 kg	Wang Guixian; China	Aurélie Nicole; France	None awarded
