= Wushu at the 2010 Asian Games – Men's changquan =

Men's changquan at the 2010 Asian Games
- Venue: Nansha Gymnasium
- Dates: 13 November 2010
- Competitors: 14 from 12 nations

Medalists
gold medal	Yuan Xiaochao	China
silver medal	Daisuke Ichikizaki	Japan
bronze medal	Ehsan Peighambari	Iran

The men's changquan competition at the 2010 Asian Games in Guangzhou, China was held on 13 November at the Nansha Gymnasium.

== Schedule ==
All times are China Standard Time (UTC+08:00)

Date	Time	Event
Saturday, 13 November 2010	08:30	Final

== Results ==
Legend

- DNS — Did not start

Rank	Athlete	Score
1st place, gold medalist(s)	Yuan Xiaochao (CHN)	9.78
2nd place, silver medalist(s)	Daisuke Ichikizaki (JPN)	9.72
3rd place, bronze medalist(s)	Ehsan Peighambari (IRI)	9.70
4	Chu Chi Wai (MAC)	9.69
5	Nguyễn Huy Thành (VIE)	9.65
6	Wu Nok In (MAC)	9.65
7	Ang Eng Chong (MAS)	9.64
8	Leung Man Chun (HKG)	9.53
9	Yeo Hea-jin (KOR)	9.47
10	Mehdi Ghobadi (IRI)	9.15
11	Dewan Singh Huidrom (IND)	9.07
12	Bikash Rai (NEP)	8.17
—	Mohammed Abu Bakkar (BAN)	DNS
—	Anousone Rasabo (LAO)	DNS
