= Lindswell Kwok =

Indonesian tai chi and wushu practitioner

Lindswell
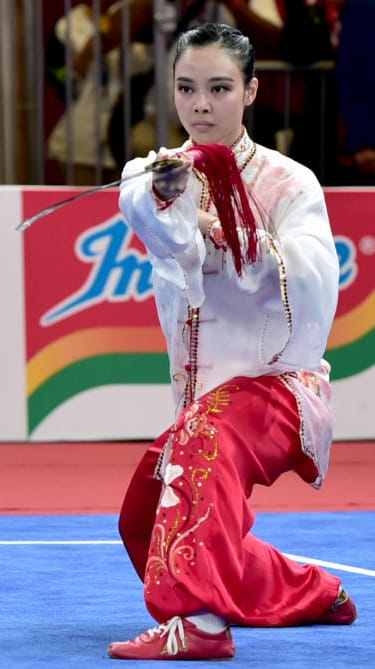
- Lindswell at the 2018 Asian Games

Personal information
- Nickname: "Queen of Wushu"
- Nationality: Indonesian
- Born: 24 September 1991 (age 34) Binjai, North Sumatra, Indonesia
- Occupations: Martial artist, athlete
- Height: 161 cm (5 ft 3 in)
- Weight: 53 kg (117 lb)
- Spouse: Achmad Hulaefi (m. 2018)
- Children: 2

Sport
- Sport: Wushu
- Events: Taijiquan, Taijijian
- Team: Indonesia wushu team
- Coached by: Zhang Yue Ning
- Retired: 2018
Medal record
Women's wushu taolu
Representing Indonesia
World Games
Gold medal – first place	2013 Cali	Taijiquan+Taijijian
World Combat Games
Gold medal – first place	2010 Beijing	Taijiquan+Taijijian
Gold medal – first place	2013 Saint Petersburg	Taijiquan+Taijijian
World Championships
Gold medal – first place	2009 Toronto	Taijiquan
Gold medal – first place	2013 Kuala Lumpur	Taijijian
Gold medal – first place	2015 Jakarta	Taijiquan
Gold medal – first place	2015 Jakarta	Taijijian
Gold medal – first place	2017 Kazan	Taijiquan
Silver medal – second place	2011 Ankara	Taijiquan
Silver medal – second place	2013 Kuala Lumpur	Taijiquan
Bronze medal – third place	2009 Toronto	Taijijian
Bronze medal – third place	2011 Ankara	Taijijian
World Taijiquan Championships
Gold medal – first place	2014 Dujiangyan	Taijijian
Gold medal – first place	2016 Warsaw	Taijiquan
Gold medal – first place	2016 Warsaw	Taijijian
Bronze medal – third place	2014 Dujiangyan	Taijiquan
Asian Games
Gold medal – first place	2018 Jakarta–Palembang	Taijiquan+Taijijian
Silver medal – second place	2014 Incheon	Taijiquan+Taijijian
Asian Championships
Bronze medal – third place	2008 Macau	Taijijian
Bronze medal – third place	2012 Ho Chi Minh City	Taijiquan
Islamic Solidarity Games
Gold medal – first place	2013 Palembang	Taijiquan
Gold medal – first place	2013 Palembang	Taijijian
SEA Games
Gold medal – first place	2011 Jakarta–Palembang	Taijiquan+Taijijian
Gold medal – first place	2013 Naypyidaw	Taijiquan+Taijijian
Gold medal – first place	2015 Singapore	Taijiquan
Gold medal – first place	2015 Singapore	Taijijian
Gold medal – first place	2017 Kuala Lumpur	Taijijian
Silver medal – second place	2009 Vientiane	Taijiquan+Taijijian
ASEAN University Games
Gold medal – first place	2014 Palembang	Taijiquan
World Junior Championships
Gold medal – first place	2008 Bali	Taijiquan (A)
Bronze medal – third place	2006 Kuala Lumpur	Taijijian (B)

Lindswell, also known as Lindswell Kwok (Chinese: 郭利娟; pinyin: Guō Lìjuān; jyutping: Kwok Lei Yun), born 24 September 1991) is an Indonesian former wushu taolu athlete specializing in taijiquan. She is one of the most renowned wushu athletes of all time. In 2013, she was named Best Athlete by the Indonesian Olympic Committee, and received the Dharma Sports Medal, the highest sports award in Indonesia. For her achievements, Indonesian media dubbed her as the "queen of wushu".

== Career ==
=== Junior career ===
Kwok began practicing wushu in 1999, following her brother Iwan. She won a silver medal in the Indonesian Junior National Competition in 2005 and a gold medal the following year. In 2006, she competed at the first World Junior Wushu Championships (WJWC) in Kuala Lumpur, Malaysia, and won the bronze medal in taijijian. A year later, she debuted at the 2007 World Wushu Championships in Beijing, China, and placed fourth in taijiquan. She then represented North Sumatra at the 2008 National Games and won a silver medal. Due to her high placement at the world championships from the previous year, she was also able to compete in the 2008 Beijing Wushu Tournament where she placed sixth in the women's taijiquan combined event. Also in 2008, she competed at the second World Junior Wushu Championships in Bali, Indonesia, where she won the gold medal in taijiquan.

=== 2009-2013 ===
Lindswell competed at the 2009 World Wushu Championships in Toronto, Canada, and won a gold medal in taijiquan and a bronze medal in taijijian. In her first event of taijiquan, Lindswell tied Japan's Ai Myaoka with a score of 9.80, but was declared the winner due to tie-breaking procedures regarding B-score. In her second event of taijijian, she received a score of 9.74. Shortly after, she then competed in the 2009 SEA Games in Vientiane, Laos, and won the silver medal in the taijiquan and taijijian combined event under Chai Fong Ying.

In 2010 at the first rendition of the World Combat Games in Beijing, China, she won the gold medal in the taijiquan and taijijian combined event. A few months later, she competed in women's taijiquan the 2010 Asian Games. During the first round of competition which consisted of taijijian, Lindswell was in a three-way tie for first with Malaysia's Chai Fong Ying and Japan's Ai Miyaoka whom all scored 9.67. In the second round of taijiquan, Lindswell received a low score of 9.43 due to some deductions and placed sixth overall in the event with a score of 19.10.

At the 2011 World Wushu Championships in Ankara, Turkey, Lindswell won a silver medal in taijiquan and a bronze medal in taijijian. A month later, Lindswell competed at the 2011 SEA Games in Jakarta, Indonesia. She won the gold medal in the taijiquan and taijijian combined event with a combined score of 19.47.

Lindswell's next major appearance was at the 2013 World Games in Cali, Colombia, and won the gold medal in the taijiquan and taijijian combined event. Around two months later, she competed in the 2013 Islamic Solidarity Games, and won gold medals in the taijiquan and taijijian events. Half a month later, she competed in the 2013 World Combat Games in St. Petersburg, Russia, and won once again in the taijiquan combined event, thus making her the only wushu athlete to win two gold medals at the World Combat Games. Two weeks later, she competed in the 2013 World Wushu Championships in Kuala Lumpur, Malaysia, and won a gold medal in taijijian and a silver medal in taijiquan. Around a month later, she competed in the 2013 SEA Games in Naypyidaw, Myanmar and won again in the taijiquan and taijijian combined event.

=== 2014-2018 ===
In women's taijiquan at the 2014 Asian Games in Incheon, South Korea, Lindswell steadily held her second-place position during both rounds and thus was able to win the silver medal slightly above Japan's Ai Uchida and under China's Yu Mengmeng. Over a month later, she competed in the first rendition of the World Taijiquan Championships in Dujiangyan, China, and won a won a gold and a bronze medal in Yang-style taijiquan and taijijian, respectively.

The following year, Lindswell first competed at the 2015 Southeast Asian Games held in Singapore. The taijiquan and taijijian events were reformed into two separate events, and Lindswell was able to win gold medals in each event. Four months later at the 2015 World Wushu Championships in Jakarta, Indonesia, she was a double gold medalist in her usual events.

A year later, Lindswell returned to the World Taijiquan Championships in 2016 which were held in Warsaw, Poland, and she was a double gold medalist in yang style taijiquan and taijijian.

At the 2017 SEA Games in Kuala Lumpur, Malaysia, she only competed and won in taijijian, as the taijiquan event was modified to be a compulsory routine event. At the 2017 World Wushu Championships in Kazan, Russia, despite placing twelfth in the taijijian event, she won the gold medal in taijiquan, her fifth gold medal. With this achievement, she firmly established herself as the most renowned taijiquan athlete at the world championships.

In women's taijiquan at the 2018 Asian Games in Jakarta, Indonesia, Lindswell established her dominance over the competition and won the gold medal by consistently scoring 9.75 in both of her events. The President of Indonesia, Joko Widodo, witnessed her victory and referred to her as the "queen of Asia." After her victory, Lindswell announced her formal retirement from competition, citing knee injuries as her main reason.

== Personal life ==
Her brother, Iwan Kwok, became a secretary and a coach of the Indonesian Wushu Federation.

In 2015, Lindswell, originally a practitioner of Buddhism, started studying Islam after watching one of her teammates pray. After the 2018 Asian Games, she officially converted to Islam and, on December 9, 2018, married her former wushu teammate Achmad Hulaefi. Their son, Achmad Zubayr, was born on January 10, 2020. In 2022, their second son, Achmad Miqdad, was born.

== Awards ==
By the Republic of Indonesia

- Dharma Sports Medal (2013)

Indonesian Sport Awards

- Favorite Female Athlete (2018)

== See also ==
- List of Asian Games medalists in wushu
