= Lin Fan (wushu) =

Chinese wushu practitioner

Personal information
- Born: 30 January 1987 (age 39) Xianyou, Fujian, China
- Height: 1.60 m (5 ft 3 in)
- Weight: 52 kg (115 lb)

Sport
- Sport: Wushu
- Event(s): Nanquan, Nandao, Nangun
- Team: Fujian Wushu Team
- Coached by: Wei Dantong
Medal record
Representing China
Women's Wushu Taolu
Olympic Games (Unofficial)
Gold medal – first place	2008 Beijing	Nanquan+Nandao
World Games
Gold medal – first place	2009 Kaohsiung	Nanquan+Nandao
World Championships
Gold medal – first place	2007 Beijing	Nanquan
Gold medal – first place	2011 Ankara	Nanquan
Asian Games
Gold medal – first place	2010 Guangzhou	Nanquan+Nandao
Asian Championships
Gold medal – first place	2008 Macau	Nandao

Lin Fan (Chinese: 林凡; pinyin: Lín fán; born January 30, 1987) is a retired wushu taolu athlete from China.

== Career ==
Lin's first major international appearance was at the 2007 World Wushu Championships in Beijing, China, where she won the first gold medal of the competition in nanquan. A year later, Lin won became the asian champion in nandao at the 2008 Asian Wushu Championships. She was then selected to compete at the 2008 Beijing Wushu Tournament and won the gold medal in women's nanquan. At the 2009 World Games in Kaohsiung, Taiwan, she won in the women's nanquan and nandao combined event and a year later, won in the same event at the 2010 Asian Games in Gunagzhou. Her last competition was at the 2011 World Wushu Championships in Ankara, Turkey where she was the world champion in nanquan.

== See also ==
- List of Asian Games medalists in wushu
- China national wushu team
