= 2008 Beijing Wushu Tournament – Women's taijiquan =

Women's taijiquan at the 2008 Beijing Wushu Tournament
- Venue: Olympic Sports Center Gymnasium
- Dates: 22-23 August
- Competitors: 7 from 7 nations

Medalists
gold medal	Cui Wenjuan	China
silver medal	Chai Fong Ying	Malaysia
bronze medal	Ai Miyaoka	Japan

The women's taijiquan / taijijian all-around competition at the 2008 Beijing Wushu Tournament was held from August 22 to 23 at the Olympic Sports Center Gymnasium.

== Schedule ==
All times are Beijing Time (UTC+08:00)

Date	Time	Event
Friday, 22 August, 2008	11:10	Taijiquan
Saturday, 23 August, 2008	10:29	Taijijian

== Results ==
The taijiquan event was judged with the degree of difficulty component while the taijijian event was judged without it.

Rank	Athlete	Taijiquan	Taijijian	Total
1	Cui Wenjuan (CHN)	9.85	9.84	19.69
2	Chai Fong Ying (MAS)	9.64	9.70	19.34
3	Ai Miyaoka (JPN)	9.66	9.64	19.30
4	Fan Man-Yun (TPE)	9.62	9.61	19.23
5	Peggie Ho Pak Kei (HKG)	9.58	9.56	19.14
6	Lindswell Kwok (INA)	9.44	9.51	18.95
7	Ho Si Hang (MAC)	9.41	9.53	18.94
8	Susie Parnham (AUS)	8.96	8.94	17.90
