= Wushu at the 2018 Asian Games – Men's changquan =

Men's changquan at the 2018 Asian Games
- Venue: Jakarta International Expo
- Dates: 19 August 2018
- Competitors: 18 from 16 nations

Medalists
gold medal	Sun Peiyuan	China
silver medal	Edgar Xavier Marvelo	Indonesia
bronze medal	Tsai Tse-min	Chinese Taipei

The men's changquan competition at the 2018 Asian Games was held on 19 August at the Jakarta International Expo. It was the first set of medals to be awarded in the 2018 Asian Games.

== Schedule ==
All times are Western Indonesia Time (UTC+07:00)

Date	Time	Event
Sunday, 19 August 2018	09:00	Final

== Results ==
Legend

- DNS — Did not start

Rank	Athlete	Score
1st place, gold medalist(s)	Sun Peiyuan (CHN)	9.75
2nd place, silver medalist(s)	Edgar Xavier Marvelo (INA)	9.72
3rd place, bronze medalist(s)	Tsai Tse-min (TPE)	9.70
4	Song Chi Kuan (MAC)	9.68
5	Anjul Namdeo (IND)	9.66
6	Yong Yi Xiang (SGP)	9.65
7	Ren Sakamoto (JPN)	9.64
8	Yeap Wai Kin (MAS)	9.63
9	Wong Weng Son (MAS)	9.59
10	M. Suraj Singh (IND)	9.51
11	Arstan Urazov (KAZ)	9.36
12	Lee Ha-sung (KOR)	9.31
13	Htet Han Kyaw (MYA)	8.94
14	Bijay Sinjali (NEP)	8.25
15	Golab Shah Omari (AFG)	8.09
16	Saddam Al-Rahomi (YEM)	7.99
17	Muhammad Abdul Rehman (PAK)	6.70
—	Trần Xuân Hiệp (VIE)	DNS
