= Sun Peiyuan =

Chinese wushu practitioner (born 1989)

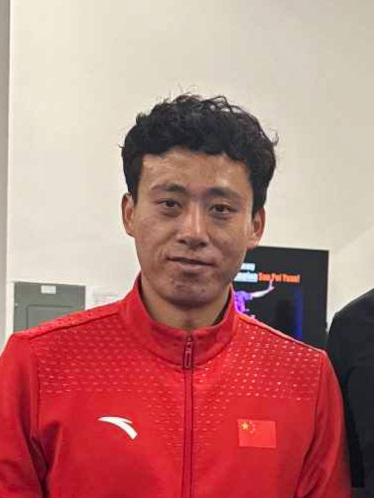
- Sun Peiyuan in San Jose, California in 2025.

Personal information
- Born: August 27, 1989 (age 37) Zibo, Shandong, China
- Education: Shandong University of Finance and Economics
- Occupations: Martial artist, athlete, coach
- Height: 1.70 m (5 ft 7 in)
- Weight: 63 kg (139 lb)

Sport
- Sport: Wushu
- Events: Changquan, Daoshu, Gunshu
- Team: Shandong Wushu Team (2003-current)
- Coached by: Lu Yongxu
Medal record
Representing China
Men's Wushu Taolu
World Championships
Gold medal – first place	2011 Ankara	Daoshu
Gold medal – first place	2015 Jakarta	Changquan
World Cup
Gold medal – first place	2016 Fuzhou	Changquan
Asian Games
Gold medal – first place	2014 Incheon	Daoshu+Gunshu
Gold medal – first place	2018 Jakarta-Palembang	Changquan
Gold medal – first place	2022 Hangzhou	Changquan

Sun Peiyuan (Chinese: 孙培原; pinyin: Sūnpéiyuán; born August 27, 1989) is a professional wushu taolu athlete from China. He is regarded as one of the most dominant wushu athletes of the 2010s, having been the first athlete to achieve the new version of the "grand slam" (gold medals at the national championships, National Games of China, Asian Games, World Cup, and the World Wushu Championships).

== Career ==
Sun started training wushu at the age of six. In 2003, he was selected to join the Shandong provincial wushu team and in 2009, Sun was admitted into the Physical Education Institute of the Shandong University of Finance and Economics.

Sun's first major appearance was at the 2009 National Games of China where he won a bronze medal in men's daoshu and gunshu combined. His international debut was two years later at the 2011 World Wushu Championships where he became the world champion in men's daoshu. Two years later, he competed in the 2013 National Games of China and won the silver medal in the changquan all-around event. A year later, he appeared at the 2014 Asian Games and won the gold medal in the men's daoshu and gunshu combined event. He then won a gold medal in changquan at the 2015 World Wushu Championships, followed by a win in the same event at the 2016 Taolu World Cup. A year later at the 2017 National Games of China, he won the gold medal in men's all-around changquan. Sun then returned to the Asian Games in 2018 and won the gold medal in men's changquan, which was the first medal for China at the 2018 Asian Games.

At the 2021 National Games of China, Sun won the bronze medal in men's chanquan all-around due to a 0.1 point deduction in his changquan routine. Two years later at the 2022 Asian Games, Sun repeated his gold medal victory in men's changquan.

== Competitive history ==
Year	Event	CQ	DS	GS	AA
Senior
2009	National Games	3rd place, bronze medalist(s)	?	?	3rd place, bronze medalist(s)
2010	National Championships	2nd place, silver medalist(s)	3rd place, bronze medalist(s)	3rd place, bronze medalist(s)	
2011	World Championships		1st place, gold medalist(s)		
2011	National Championships	3rd place, bronze medalist(s)			
2012	National University Games of China	?	?	?	1st place, gold medalist(s)
2012	National Championships	2nd place, silver medalist(s)	3rd place, bronze medalist(s)		
2013	National Games	?	?	?	2nd place, silver medalist(s)
2014	Asian Games		1	1	1st place, gold medalist(s)
2015	World Championships	1st place, gold medalist(s)			
2016	World Cup	1st place, gold medalist(s)			
2017	National Games	?	?	?	1st place, gold medalist(s)
2018	Asian Games	1st place, gold medalist(s)			
2020	did not compete due to COVID-19 pandemic				
2021	National Games	4	1	2	3rd place, bronze medalist(s)
2023	Asian Games	1st place, gold medalist(s)			

== Awards ==
Awarded by the General Administration of Sport of China:

- Sports Medal of Honor (2012)
- Elite Athlete (2016)

== See also ==
- List of Asian Games medalists in wushu
- China national wushu team
