= Wushu at the 2006 Asian Games – Women's changquan combined =

Women's changquan combined at the 2006 Asian Games
- Venue: Aspire Hall 3
- Dates: 11–14 December 2006
- Competitors: 12 from 11 nations

Medalists
gold medal	Ma Lingjuan	China
silver medal	Susyana Tjhan	Indonesia
bronze medal	Han Jing	Macau

The women's changquan three events combined competition (Changquan, Qiangshu and Jianshu) at the 2006 Asian Games in Doha, Qatar was held from 11 to 14 December at the Aspire Hall 3.

== Schedule ==
All times are Arabia Standard Time (UTC+03:00)

Date	Time	Event
Monday, 11 December 2006	13:00	Qiangshu
Tuesday, 12 December 2006	10:30	Changquan
Thursday, 14 December 2006	11:30	Jianshu

== Results ==
Legend

- DNS — Did not start

Rank	Athlete	Qiangshu	Changquan	Jianshu	Total
1st place, gold medalist(s)	Ma Lingjuan (CHN)	9.86	9.87	9.86	29.59
2nd place, silver medalist(s)	Susyana Tjhan (INA)	9.38	9.53	9.65	28.56
3rd place, bronze medalist(s)	Han Jing (MAC)	9.29	9.49	9.70	28.48
4	Khor Poh Chin (SIN)	9.25	9.38	9.47	28.10
5	Vũ Trà My (VIE)	9.17	9.29	9.55	28.01
6	Chen Shao-chi (TPE)	9.30	9.00	9.54	27.84
7	Amy Wong (HKG)	9.27	9.01	9.54	27.82
8	Ng Xin Ni (SIN)	9.05	9.26	9.45	27.76
9	Jeong Mi-na (KOR)	8.62	8.78	9.30	26.70
10	Yevgeniya Ragulina (KAZ)	8.80	8.74	9.07	26.61
11	Bhuwan Shrestha (NEP)	8.12	6.75	8.42	23.29
12	Ayapana Toshibala (IND)	DNS	DNS	DNS	0.00
