= Wushu at the 2006 Asian Games – Men's changquan combined =

Men's changquan combined at the 2006 Asian Games
- Venue: Aspire Hall 3
- Dates: 11–14 December 2006
- Competitors: 20 from 18 nations

Medalists
gold medal	Yuan Xiaochao	China
silver medal	Jia Rui	Macau
bronze medal	Aung Si Thu	Myanmar

The men's changquan three events combined competition (Changquan, Daoshu and Gunshu) at the 2006 Asian Games in Doha, Qatar was held from 11 to 14 December at the Aspire Hall 3.

== Schedule ==
All times are Arabia Standard Time (UTC+03:00)

Date	Time	Event
Monday, 11 December 2006	12:00	Changquan
Tuesday, 12 December 2006	11:30	Daoshu
Thursday, 14 December 2006	12:30	Gunshu

== Results ==
Legend

- DNS — Did not start

Rank	Athlete	Changquan	Daoshu	Gunshu	Total
1st place, gold medalist(s)	Yuan Xiaochao (CHN)	9.80	9.85	9.85	29.50
2nd place, silver medalist(s)	Jia Rui (MAC)	9.70	9.58	9.76	29.04
3rd place, bronze medalist(s)	Aung Si Thu (MYA)	9.59	9.45	9.73	28.77
4	Trần Đức Trọng (VIE)	9.56	9.64	9.48	28.68
5	Ang Eng Chong (MAS)	9.65	9.60	9.40	28.65
6	Cheng Chung Hang (HKG)	9.33	9.63	9.53	28.49
7	Yuki Shimomura (JPN)	9.48	9.57	9.29	28.34
8	Daisuke Ichikizaki (JPN)	9.53	9.25	9.40	28.18
9	Dennis To (HKG)	9.27	9.54	9.24	28.05
10	Siow Kin Yan (SIN)	8.91	9.32	9.37	27.60
11	Kou Kun Chi (MAC)	8.89	9.40	9.15	27.44
12	Hsiao Yung-sheng (TPE)	8.77	9.37	9.30	27.44
13	Ghaffar Amani (IRI)	9.50	9.04	8.75	27.29
14	Kim Tae-hwa (KOR)	9.05	8.75	9.22	27.02
15	Dilshod Bazarov (UZB)	8.31	8.41	9.00	25.72
16	Bikash Gurung (NEP)	7.10	7.70	8.44	23.24
17	Vatche Nikoghossian (LIB)	7.55	7.30	7.80	22.65
18	W. Inunganba Singh (IND)	DNS	DNS	DNS	0.00
18	Sujeewan Premarathna (SRI)	DNS	DNS	DNS	0.00
18	Ammar Jalabi (SYR)	DNS	DNS	DNS	0.00
