= 2005 World Wushu Championships =

8th edition of the World Wushu Championships

2005 World Championships
- Venue: Quan Ngua Sports Palace (capacity: 5,500)
- Location: Hanoi, Vietnam
- Start date: December 4, 2005
- End date: December 14, 2005
- Competitors: 525 from 67 nations

The 2005 World Wushu Championships was the 8th edition of the World Wushu Championships. It was held at the Quan Ngua Sports Palace in Hanoi, Vietnam from December 9 to December 14, 2005. 525 athletes from 67 IWUF national federations participated in this event.

== Medal table ==
* Host nation (Vietnam)

| Rank | NOC | Gold | Silver | Bronze | Total |
|---|---|---|---|---|---|
| 1 | China | 18 | 1 | 0 | 19 |
| 2 | Vietnam* | 5 | 8 | 3 | 16 |
| 3 | Malaysia | 4 | 1 | 6 | 11 |
| 4 | Philippines | 3 | 1 | 1 | 5 |
| 5 | Macau | 2 | 4 | 2 | 8 |
| 6 | Hong Kong | 2 | 3 | 0 | 5 |
| 7 | Russia | 2 | 1 | 5 | 8 |
| 8 | Iran | 2 | 1 | 2 | 5 |
| 9 | Chinese Taipei | 1 | 4 | 4 | 9 |
| 10 | South Korea | 1 | 4 | 2 | 7 |
| 11 | Italy | 1 | 1 | 4 | 6 |
| 12 | Netherlands | 1 | 0 | 1 | 2 |
| 13 | United States | 0 | 2 | 4 | 6 |
| 14 | Myanmar | 0 | 2 | 1 | 3 |
| 15 | Romania | 0 | 2 | 0 | 2 |
| 16 | Great Britain | 0 | 1 | 1 | 2 |
| 17 | Armenia | 0 | 1 | 0 | 1 |
| 17 | Lebanon | 0 | 1 | 0 | 1 |
| 17 | Singapore | 0 | 1 | 0 | 1 |
| 20 | Japan | 0 | 0 | 4 | 4 |
| 21 | Turkey | 0 | 0 | 3 | 3 |
| 22 | Canada | 0 | 0 | 1 | 1 |
| 22 | France | 0 | 0 | 1 | 1 |
| 22 | India | 0 | 0 | 1 | 1 |
| 22 | New Zealand | 0 | 0 | 1 | 1 |
| 22 | South Africa | 0 | 0 | 1 | 1 |
| 22 | Spain | 0 | 0 | 1 | 1 |
| 22 | Sweden | 0 | 0 | 1 | 1 |
| 22 | Switzerland | 0 | 0 | 1 | 1 |
| 22 | Yemen | 0 | 0 | 1 | 1 |
| Totals (30 entries) | | 42 | 39 | 52 | 133 |

== Medalists ==
=== Men's taolu ===
| Event | Gold | Silver | Bronze |
|---|---|---|---|
| Changquan | Yuan Xiaochao; China | Ang Eng Chong; Malaysia | Daisuke Ichikizaki; Japan |
| Daoshu | Fei Bao Xian; Netherlands | Jia Rui; Macau | Nguyễn Tiến Đạt; Vietnam |
| Gunshu | Zhao Jie; China | Cheng Chung Hang; Hong Kong | Jia Rui; Macau |
| Jianshu | Lim Yew Fai; Malaysia | Pyi Wai Phyo; Myanmar | Lai Jian-cheng; Chinese Taipei |
| Qiangshu | Zhang Jidong; China | Nguyễn Văn Cường; Vietnam | Raúl Estévez; Spain |
| Nanquan | Zheng Leishi; China | Peng Wei-chua; Chinese Taipei | Pui Fook Chien; Malaysia |
| Nandao | Ho Ro Bin; Malaysia | Shared gold | Pui Fook Chien; Malaysia |
| Nandao | Peng Wei-chua; Chinese Taipei | Shared gold | Pui Fook Chien; Malaysia |
| Nangun | Cheng Ka Ho; Hong Kong | Shared gold | Lee Seung-kuen; South Korea |
| Nangun | Pui Fook Chien; Malaysia | Shared gold | Lee Seung-kuen; South Korea |
| Taijiquan | Zhou Bin; China | Jang Young-ho; South Korea | Lee Yang; Malaysia |
| Taijijian | Lee Jae-hyung; South Korea | Chang Ching-kuei; Chinese Taipei | Lee Yang; Malaysia |
| Duilian | Vietnam; Nguyễn Tiến Đạt; Trần Đức Trọng | Myanmar; Pyi Wai Phyo; Aung Si Thu | Chinese Taipei; Peng Wei-chua; Hsiao Yung-sheng; Lai Jian-cheng |

=== Women's taolu ===
| Event | Gold | Silver | Bronze |
|---|---|---|---|
| Changquan | Cao Jing; China | Xu Huihui; Italy | Yuki Hiraoka; Japan |
| Daoshu | Xu Huihui; Italy | Đàm Thanh Xuân; Vietnam | Yulia Chernitsova; Russia |
| Gunshu | Đàm Thanh Xuân; Vietnam | Yulia Chernitsova; Russia | Xu Huihui; Italy |
| Jianshu | Zhang Chunyan; China | Han Jing; Macau | Chen Shao-chi; Chinese Taipei |
| Qiangshu | Ma Lingjuan; China | Han Jing; Macau | Shared silver |
| Qiangshu | Ma Lingjuan; China | Nguyễn Thị Mỹ Đức; Vietnam | Shared silver |
| Nanquan | Mao Yaqi; China | Chen Shao-chi; Chinese Taipei | Erika Kojima; Japan |
| Nandao | Huang Yan Hui; Macau | Angie Tsang; Hong Kong | Swe Swe Thant; Myanmar |
| Nangun | Angie Tsang; Hong Kong | Huang Yan Hui; Macau | Shared silver |
| Nangun | Angie Tsang; Hong Kong | Nguyễn Thị Ngọc Oanh; Vietnam | Shared silver |
| Taijiquan | Zhang Fang; China | Fan Man-yun; Chinese Taipei | Kaya Yamagishi; Japan |
| Taijijian | Chai Fong Ying; Malaysia | Shared gold | Liu Yu-chien; Chinese Taipei |
| Taijijian | Bùi Mai Phương; Vietnam | Shared gold | Liu Yu-chien; Chinese Taipei |
| Duilian | Macau; Han Jing; Huang Yan Hui | Hong Kong; Law Sum Yin; Amy Wong; Peggie Ho | Shared silver |
| Duilian | Macau; Han Jing; Huang Yan Hui | Singapore; Deng Ying Zhi; Ng Xin Ni | Shared silver |

=== Men's sanda ===
| Event | Gold | Silver | Bronze |
|---|---|---|---|
| 48 kg | Rene Catalan; Philippines | Vũ Văn Linh; Vietnam | Mehmet Haldizoğlu; Turkey |
| 48 kg | Rene Catalan; Philippines | Vũ Văn Linh; Vietnam | Mohammed Al-Ashwal; Yemen |
| 52 kg | Benjie Rivera; Philippines | Woo Seung-soo; South Korea | Salman Torki; Iran |
| 52 kg | Benjie Rivera; Philippines | Woo Seung-soo; South Korea | Nguyễn Trí Quân; Vietnam |
| 56 kg | Rexel Nganhayna; Philippines | Felix Smoyan; Armenia | Kim Jun-yul; South Korea |
| 56 kg | Rexel Nganhayna; Philippines | Felix Smoyan; Armenia | Phan Anh Yên; Vietnam |
| 60 kg | Yu Feibiao; China | Yoo Jung-sun; South Korea | Qin Zhi Jian; Macau |
| 60 kg | Yu Feibiao; China | Yoo Jung-sun; South Korea | Felix Urudzhev; Russia |
| 65 kg | Zhao Guangyong; China | Nguyễn Đức Trung; Vietnam | Jose Palacios; United States |
| 65 kg | Zhao Guangyong; China | Nguyễn Đức Trung; Vietnam | Yunus Guseinov; Russia |
| 70 kg | Xu Yanfei; China | Kim Do-hyun; South Korea | Maximillion Chen; United States |
| 70 kg | Xu Yanfei; China | Kim Do-hyun; South Korea | Eduard Folayang; Philippines |
| 75 kg | Bian Maofu; China | William Mackay; Great Britain | Lew Chee Wai; Malaysia |
| 75 kg | Bian Maofu; China | William Mackay; Great Britain | Francesco De Tulio; Italy |
| 80 kg | Muslim Salikhov; Russia | Eslam Ghorbani; Iran | Stéphane Attelly; France |
| 80 kg | Muslim Salikhov; Russia | Eslam Ghorbani; Iran | Daniele Chiofalo; Italy |
| 85 kg | Mohammad Reza Jafari; Iran | Elie Saade; Lebanon | Oliver Hasler; Switzerland |
| 85 kg | Mohammad Reza Jafari; Iran | Elie Saade; Lebanon | Makhach Gadisov; Russia |
| 90 kg | Ali Asghar Shabani; Iran | Leontin Bocancea; Romania | Shane Dobie; Canada |
| 90 kg | Ali Asghar Shabani; Iran | Leontin Bocancea; Romania | Gajendra Singh; India |
| +90 kg | Bozigit Ataev; Russia | Yang Mingming; China | Christiaan van Die; Netherlands |
| +90 kg | Bozigit Ataev; Russia | Yang Mingming; China | None awarded |

=== Women's sanda ===
| Event | Gold | Silver | Bronze |
|---|---|---|---|
| 48 kg | Bùi Thị Như Trang; Vietnam | Cristina Toporâşte; Romania | Van Milnes; United States |
| 48 kg | Bùi Thị Như Trang; Vietnam | Cristina Toporâşte; Romania | Ding Siew Bee; Malaysia |
| 52 kg | Zhang Xiaoyan; China | Nguyễn Thùy Ngân; Vietnam | Ambra Vielmi; Italy |
| 52 kg | Zhang Xiaoyan; China | Nguyễn Thùy Ngân; Vietnam | Sevgi Akçay; Turkey |
| 56 kg | Zhang Yujie; China | Rhea May Rifani; Philippines | Razieh Tahmasebifar; Iran |
| 56 kg | Zhang Yujie; China | Rhea May Rifani; Philippines | Sarah Ponce; United States |
| 60 kg | Li Junli; China | Lê Thị Thoa; Vietnam | Ekaterina Nikolaeva; Russia |
| 60 kg | Li Junli; China | Lê Thị Thoa; Vietnam | Sümran Sözütek; Turkey |
| 65 kg | Hà Thị Hạnh; Vietnam | Tiffany Chen; United States | Ebba Lexmark; Sweden |
| 65 kg | Hà Thị Hạnh; Vietnam | Tiffany Chen; United States | Tanya Bowyer; Great Britain |
| 70 kg | Sun Hui; China | Elaina Maxwell; United States | Sandra Ackerman; South Africa |
| 70 kg | Sun Hui; China | Elaina Maxwell; United States | Raana-Ellen Mareikura; New Zealand |
