= Wushu at the 2018 Asian Games – Women's nanquan & nandao =

Women's nanquan & nandao at the 2018 Asian Games
- Venue: Jakarta International Expo
- Dates: 19–20 August 2018
- Competitors: 12 from 11 nations

Medalists
gold medal	Tang Lu	China
silver medal	Darya Latisheva	Uzbekistan
bronze medal	Yuen Ka Ying	Hong Kong

The women's Nanquan / Nandao all-round competition at the 2018 Asian Games in Jakarta, Indonesia was held on 19 and 20 August at the JIExpo Kemayoran Hall B3.

== Schedule ==
All times are Western Indonesia Time (UTC+07:00)

Date	Time	Event
Sunday, 19 August 2018	09:00	Nanquan
Monday, 20 August 2018	09:00	Nandao

== Results ==
Rank	Athlete	Nanquan	Nandao	Total
1st place, gold medalist(s)	Tang Lu (CHN)	9.75	9.74	19.49
2nd place, silver medalist(s)	Darya Latisheva (UZB)	9.69	9.58	19.27
3rd place, bronze medalist(s)	Yuen Ka Ying (HKG)	9.59	9.68	19.27
4	Tan Cheong Min (MAS)	9.71	9.44	19.15
5	Tsai Wen-chuan (TPE)	9.42	9.69	19.11
6	Hanieh Rajabi (IRI)	9.43	9.66	19.09
7	Aye Thitsar Myint (MYA)	9.34	9.67	19.01
8	Juwita Niza Wasni (INA)	9.67	9.30	18.97
9	Fatemeh Heidari (IRI)	9.37	9.59	18.96
10	Nguyễn Thùy Linh (VIE)	9.45	9.48	18.93
11	Nima Gharti Magar (NEP)	8.70	9.17	17.87
12	Dayana Utyamysheva (KAZ)	7.85	7.16	15.01
