= Zheng Tianhui =

Hong Kong wushu practitioner

Personal information
- Born: 24 January 1986 (age 40) Hefei, Anhui, China

Sport
- Sport: Wushu
- Event(s): Changquan, Jianshu, Qiangshu
- Team: Hong Kong Wushu Team
- Coached by: Yu Liguang
Medal record
Representing Hong Kong
Women's Wushu Taolu
World Combat Games
| Gold medal – first place | 2010 Beijing | Jianshu+Qiangshu |
| Bronze medal – third place | 2013 St. Petersburg | All-around (CQ) |
World Championships
| Gold medal – first place | 2009 Toronto | Qiangshu |
| Gold medal – first place | 2015 Jakarta | Duilian |
| Gold medal – first place | 2017 Kazan | Shuangjian |
| Silver medal – second place | 2009 Toronto | Jianshu |
| Silver medal – second place | 2009 Toronto | Duilian |
| Silver medal – second place | 2011 Ankara | Jianshu |
| Silver medal – second place | 2011 Ankara | Qiangshu |
| Silver medal – second place | 2013 Kuala Lumpur | Duilian |
| Bronze medal – third place | 2009 Toronto | Changquan |
| Bronze medal – third place | 2011 Ankara | Changquan |
World Cup
| Bronze medal – third place | 2016 Fuzhou | Duilian |
Asian Games
| Silver medal – second place | 2010 Guangzhou | Jianshu+Qiangshu |
Asian Championships
| Silver medal – second place | 2008 Macau | Duilian |
| Bronze medal – third place | 2008 Macau | Changquan |
Representing China
Asian Junior Championships
| Gold medal – first place | 2001 Hanoi | Changquan (A) |
| Gold medal – first place | 2001 Hanoi | Daoshu (A) |
| Gold medal – first place | 2001 Hanoi | Gunshu (A) |

Zheng Tianhui (Chinese: 郑天慧; pinyin: Zhèng Tiānhuì; born 24 January 1986) is a retired professional wushu taolu athlete from Hong Kong. She is a ten-time medalist at the World Wushu Championships and a three-time world champion. She also won a silver medal at the 2010 Asian Games.

== See also ==
- List of Asian Games medalists in wushu
