= Wushu at the 2026 Asian Games – Women's nanquan & nandao =

Women's nanquan & nandao at the 2026 Asian Games
- Venue: Aichi Budokan
- Dates: 22 September 2026
- Competitors: 10 from 9 nations

Medalists
gold medal	Zhang Yaling	China
silver medal	Darya Latisheva	Uzbekistan
bronze medal	Tan Cheong Min	Malaysia

The women's nanquan and nandao all-round competition at the 2026 Asian Games was held on 22 September 2026 at Aichi Prefectural Martial Arts Hall in Nagoya, Japan.

== Schedule ==
All times are Japan Standard Time (UTC+09:00)

Date	Time	Event
Tuesday, 22 September 2026	09:59	Nanquan
Tuesday, 22 September 2026	15:29	Nandao

== Results ==
Rank	Athlete	Nanquan	Nandao	Total
1st place, gold medalist(s)	Zhang Yaling (CHN)	9.783	9.786	19.569
2nd place, silver medalist(s)	Darya Latisheva (UZB)	9.703	9.710	19.413
3rd place, bronze medalist(s)	Tan Cheong Min (MAS)	9.726	9.663	19.389
4	Helia Asadian (IRI)	9.690	9.696	19.386
5	Byun Si-woo (KOR)	9.683	9.690	19.373
6	Chao Tang-hsuan (TPE)	9.700	9.646	19.346
7	Wong Sam In (MAC)	9.543	9.700	19.243
8	Mina Panahi (IRI)	9.716	9.253	18.969
9	Hanjabam Langlentombi Devi (IND)	9.403	9.436	18.839
10	Đặng Trần Phương Nhi (VIE)	9.140	9.170	18.310
