= Chai Fong Ying =

Malaysian wushu practitioner

Personal information
- Born: 23 October 1986 (age 39) Malacca, Malaysia
- Height: 1.56 m (5 ft 1 in)
- Weight: 46 kg (101 lb)

Sport
- Sport: Wushu
- Event(s): Taijiquan, Taijijian
- Team: Malaysia Wushu Team (2005-2013)
Medal record
Representing Malaysia
Women's Wushu Taolu
Olympic Games (unofficial)
Silver medal – second place	2008 Beijing	Taijiquan+Taijijian
World Championships
Gold medal – first place	2005 Hanoi	Taijijian
Gold medal – first place	2007 Beijing	Taijiquan
Gold medal – first place	2011 Ankara	Taijijian
Bronze medal – third place	2011 Ankara	Taijiquan
Asian Games
Gold medal – first place	2006 Doha	Taijiquan+Taijijian
Gold medal – first place	2010 Guangzhou	Taijiquan+Taijijian
Asian Championships
Gold medal – first place	2008 Macau	Taijijian
Southeast Asian Games
Gold medal – first place	2007 Nakhon Ratchasima	Taijiquan+Taijijian
Gold medal – first place	2009 Vientiane	Taijiquan+Taijijian

Chai Fong Ying (Chinese: 蔡奉芸; pinyin: Cài Fèngyún; born 23 October 1986) is a former wushu taolu and taijiquan athlete from Malaysia. She was a three-time world champion and a double gold medalist at the Asian Games and the Southeast Asian Games. She also won a silver medal at the 2008 Beijing Wushu Tournament.

== Career ==
Chai's international debut was at the 2005 World Wushu Championships where she won the gold medal in taijijian. This qualified her for the 2006 Asian Games where she won the gold medal in women's taijiquan. A year later, she competed and won the gold medal in the women's taijiquan and taijijian combined event at the 2007 Southeast Asian Games, becoming the first Malaysian woman to win a gold medal in wushu at the Games. After winning the gold medal in taijiquan and placing fourth in taijijian at the 2007 World Wushu Championships, Chai qualified for the 2008 Beijing Wushu Tournament where she won the silver medal in the women's taijiquan combined event. She also won a gold medal in taijijian at the 2008 Asian Wushu Championships. Chai then competed in the 2009 Southeast Asian Games and won the gold medal in the taijiquan and taijijian combined event once more. Despite not winning medals at the 2009 World Wushu Championships, she qualified for the 2010 Asian Games where she kept her gold medal title in women's taijiquan, becoming the first non-Chinese athlete to become a double gold medalist. Her last major appearance as a year later at the 2011 World Wushu Championships where she won a bronze medal in taijiquan.

In 2013, Chai announced her retirement from competition, citing injuries and her desires to start a business career as her main reasons for doing so. She became the acting secretary of the Malaysian Wushu Federation, but stepped down a year later when it became known that Malaysian athlete, Tai Cheau Xuen, was tested positive for sibutramine after winning the gold medal in women's nanquan at the 2014 Asian Games.

== See also ==
- List of Asian Games medalists in wushu
