= Wushu at the 2006 Asian Games – Women's taijiquan combined =

Women's taijiquan combined at the 2006 Asian Games
- Venue: Aspire Hall 3
- Dates: 11–13 December 2006
- Competitors: 16 from 11 nations

Medalists
gold medal	Chai Fong Ying	Malaysia
silver medal	Ai Miyaoka	Japan
bronze medal	Ng Shin Yii	Malaysia

The women's combined taijiquan and taijijian competition at the 2006 Asian Games in Doha, Qatar was held from 11 to 13 December at the Aspire Hall 3.

== Schedule ==
All times are Arabia Standard Time (UTC+03:00)

Date	Time	Event
Monday, 11 December 2006	10:00	Taijiquan
Wednesday, 13 December 2006	11:00	Taijijian

== Results ==
Legend

- DNS — Did not start

Rank	Athlete	Taijiquan	Taijijian	Total
1st place, gold medalist(s)	Chai Fong Ying (MAS)	9.71	9.67	19.38
2nd place, silver medalist(s)	Ai Miyaoka (JPN)	9.66	9.60	19.26
3rd place, bronze medalist(s)	Ng Shin Yii (MAS)	9.65	9.57	19.22
4	Liu Yu-chien (TPE)	9.55	9.60	19.15
5	Fan Man-yun (TPE)	9.56	9.49	19.05
6	Janice Sy Hung (PHI)	9.48	9.57	19.05
7	Naoko Sato (JPN)	9.50	9.50	19.00
8	Honey Ko Ko (MYA)	9.52	9.41	18.93
9	Peggie Ho (HKG)	9.45	9.46	18.91
10	Yun Sun-kyung (KOR)	9.50	9.35	18.85
11	Tao Yi Jun (SIN)	9.49	9.35	18.84
12	Ho Si Hang (MAC)	9.46	9.35	18.81
13	Bùi Mai Phương (VIE)	8.74	9.43	18.17
14	Lee Hye-mi (KOR)	8.09	9.27	17.36
15	Daria Kirilova (KGZ)	DNS	DNS	0.00
15	Aisuluu Asankulova (KGZ)	DNS	DNS	0.00
