= Darya Latisheva =

Uzbekistan wushu practitioner

Personal information
- Native name: Дарья Латышева
- Born: March 22, 2000 (age 26)
- Height: 1.55 m (5 ft 1 in)

Sport
- Sport: Wushu
- Events: Nanquan, Nandao, Nangun
- Team: Uzbekistan Wushu Team
Medal record
Representing Uzbekistan
Women's Wushu Taolu
World Games
| Silver medal – second place | 2022 Birmingham | Nanquan+Nandao |
| Silver medal – second place | 2025 Chengdu | Nanquan+Nandao |
World Games Series
| Silver medal – second place | 2024 Hong Kong | Nanquan+Nandao |
World Combat Games
| Gold medal – first place | Riyadh 2023 | Nanquan+Nandao |
World Championships
| Bronze medal – third place | 2019 Shanghai | Nandao |
World Cup
| Silver medal – second place | 2026 Haikou | Nangun |
International Wushu Invitational Tournament
| Gold medal – first place | 2024 Jiangyin | Nanquan |
| Gold medal – first place | 2024 Jiangyin | Nandao |
| Bronze medal – third place | 2024 Jiangyin | Nangun |
World University Games
| Silver medal – second place | 2021 Chengdu | Nanquan |
Asian Games
| Silver medal – second place | 2018 Jakarta–Palembang | Nanquan+Nandao |
| Silver medal – second place | 2026 Aichi–Nagoya | Nanquan+Nandao |
| Bronze medal – third place | 2022 Hangzhou | Nanquan+Nandao |
Asian Championships
| Silver medal – second place | 2024 Macau | Nandao |
| Bronze medal – third place | 2024 Macau | Nangun |
Asian Cup
| Gold medal – first place | 2025 Songyuan | Nandao |

Darya Anatolyevna Latisheva (born March 22, 2000) is a wushu taolu athlete from Uzbekistan.

== Career ==
Latisheva's international debut was at the 2017 World Wushu Championships where she finished 10th in nanquan. A year later at the 2018 Asian Games she won the silver medal in women's nanquan and nandao combined. At the following 2019 World Wushu Championships, she won a bronze medal in nandao.

After the start of the COVID-19 pandemic, Latisheva's first major appearance was at the 2022 World Games where she won the silver medal in women's nanquan and nandao combined. A year later, she competed at the Shortly after, she competed in the 2021 Summer World University Games (hosted in 2023) and won the silver medal in women's nanquan. Latisheva then appeared at the 2022 Asian Games (hosted in 2023) and won the bronze medal in women's nanquan and nandao combined. Shortly after, she won the gold medal in the same event at the 2023 World Combat Games. Unable to attend the 2023 World Wushu Championships, she competed at the 2024 International Wushu Invitational Tournament where she won gold medals in nanquan and nandao and a bronze medal in nangun. Months later, she was a double medalist at the 2024 Asian Wushu Championships. She was then a silver medalist in nanquan at the 2024 World Games Series. A year later, she won the gold medal in nandao at the 2025 Taolu Asian Cup.

== See also ==
- List of Asian Games medalists in wushu
