= Wushu at the 2022 Asian Games – Women's nanquan & nandao =

Women's nanquan & nandao at the 2022 Asian Games
- Venue: Xiaoshan Guali Sports Centre
- Dates: 26 September 2023
- Competitors: 11 from 9 nations

Medalists
gold medal	Chen Huiying	China
silver medal	Tan Cheong Min	Malaysia
bronze medal	Darya Latisheva	Uzbekistan

The women's nanquan and nandao competition at the 2022 Asian Games was held on 26 September 2023 at the Xiaoshan Guali Sports Centre in Hangzhou, China.

== Schedule ==
All times are China Standard Time (UTC+08:00)

Date	Time	Event
Tuesday, 26 September 2023	09:00	Nanquan
Tuesday, 26 September 2023	14:30	Nandao

== Results ==
Legend

- DNF — Did not finish
- DNS — Did not start

Rank	Athlete	Nanquan	Nandao	Total
1st place, gold medalist(s)	Chen Huiying (CHN)	9.790	9.800	19.590
2nd place, silver medalist(s)	Tan Cheong Min (MAS)	9.703	9.716	19.419
3rd place, bronze medalist(s)	Darya Latisheva (UZB)	9.700	9.703	19.403
4	Tasya Ayu Puspa Dewi (INA)	9.680	9.686	19.366
5	He Jianxin (HKG)	9.673	9.690	19.363
6	Aye Thitsar Myint (MYA)	9.683	9.573	19.256
7	Đặng Trần Phương Nhi (VIE)	9.666	9.566	19.232
8	Hanieh Rajabi (IRI)	9.653	9.313	18.966
9	Phan Thị Tú Bình (VIE)	9.396	9.450	18.846
10	Nima Gharti Magar (NEP)	9.140	9.563	18.703
—	Mina Panahi (IRI)	DNF	DNS	DNF
