= Jia Rui =

Macau wushu practitioner

Jia Rui SLM
Personal information
- Born: 18 February 1987 (age 39) Kaifeng, Hunan Province, China
- Education: Macao Polytechnic Institute (currently Macao Polytechnic University)

Sport
- Sport: Wushu
- Event(s): Changquan, Daoshu, Gunshu
- Team: Macau Wushu Team (2003-2014)
Medal record
Representing Macau
Men's Wushu Taolu
Event	1st	2nd	3rd
World Championships	4	6	1
Asian Games	1	2	0
Asian Championships	1	2	2
East Asian Games	4	2	2
Other	1	1	0
Total	11	13	5
Olympic Games (unofficial)
Silver medal – second place	2008 Beijing	Daoshu+Gunshu
World Combat Games
Gold medal – first place	2010 Beijing	Changquan
World Championships
Gold medal – first place	2007 Beijing	Gunshu
Gold medal – first place	2009 Toronto	Daoshu
Gold medal – first place	2011 Ankara	Gunshu
Gold medal – first place	2013 Kuala Lumpur	Gunshu
Silver medal – second place	2005 Hanoi	Daoshu
Silver medal – second place	2007 Beijing	Daoshu
Silver medal – second place	2009 Toronto	Changquan
Silver medal – second place	2009 Toronto	Gunshu
Silver medal – second place	2011 Ankara	Changquan
Silver medal – second place	2011 Ankara	Daoshu
Bronze medal – third place	2005 Hanoi	Gunshu
Asian Games
Gold medal – first place	2010 Guangzhou	Daoshu+Gunshu
Silver medal – second place	2006 Doha	CQ All-Around
Silver medal – second place	2014 Incheon	Changquan
Asian Championships
Gold medal – first place	2012 Ho Chi Minh City	Daoshu
Silver medal – second place	2008 Macau	Changquan
Silver medal – second place	2008 Macau	Daoshu
Bronze medal – third place	2008 Macau	Gunshu
Bronze medal – third place	2012 Ho Chi Minh City	Gunshu
East Asian Games
Gold medal – first place	2005 Macau	Changquan
Gold medal – first place	2009 Hong Kong	Changquan
Gold medal – first place	2013 Tianjin	Changquan
Gold medal – first place	2013 Tianjin	Daoshu+Gunshu
Silver medal – second place	2005 Macau	Daoshu+Gunshu
Silver medal – second place	2009 Hong Kong	Daoshu+Gunshu
Bronze medal – third place	2005 Macau	Duilian
Bronze medal – third place	2013 Tianjin	Duilian

Jia Rui SLM (Chinese: 贾瑞; pinyin: Jiǎ Ruì; born February 18, 1987), is a retired professional wushu taolu athlete from Macau. He was one of the most dominant wushu taolu athletes of the 2000s and the early 2010s, and won the first gold medal for Macau at the Asian Games.

== Career ==
=== Early career ===
Jia started practising wushu taolu at the age of five. In 2003, the 17-year-old Jia travelled to Macau through a foreign exchange programme between the Chinese Wushu Association (CWA) and the Macau wushu team. Jia then entered the Macau Polytechnic Institute (IPM) while training wushu intensively.

=== Competitive career ===
Jia's international debut was at the 2005 East Asian Games where he won a gold medal in changquan, a silver medal in the daoshu and gunshu combined event, and a bronze medal in duilian. He then competed at the 2005 World Wushu Championships where he won a silver medal in daoshu and a bronze medal in gunshu. With these achievements, the Macau SAR government awarded Jia a certificate of merit. At the 2006 Asian Games the following year, he won the silver medal in men's changquan all-around. A year later at the 2007 World Wushu Championships, he became the world champion in gunshu and won a silver medal in daoshu. The same year, it was also arranged for him to participate in the torch relay for the 2008 Summer Olympics.

With his victories in the world championships, he qualified for the 2008 Beijing Wushu Tournament, where he earned the silver medal in the men's daoshu and gunshu combined event. That same year, he was a triple medallist at the Asian Wushu Championships. Returning to the East Asian Games in 2009, he won a gold medal in changquan and a silver medal in daoshu and gunshu. That same year at the 2009 World Wushu Championships, he was the world champion in daoshu and also won two silver medals in changquan and gunshu. A year later, Jia competed at the 2010 World Combat Games and won the gold medal in the changquan event. A few months later at the 2010 Asian Games, he made history by winning the first gold medal for Macau at the Asian Games, doing so in the daoshu and gunshu combined event.

Following his win at the Asian Games, he competed in the 2011 World Wushu Championships and once again was the world champion in gunshu and additionally won two silver medals in changquan and daoshu. A year later, he won a gold medal in daoshu and a bronze medal in gunshu at the 2012 Asian Wushu Championships. A year later at the 2013 East Asian Games, he won two gold medals in his specialty events and a bronze medal in duilian. He was also the world champion in gunshu for the third time at the 2013 World Wushu Championships. Jia's last major international competition was at the 2014 Asian Games where he won a silver medal in changquan. He subsequently retired from competition and began coaching young athletes.

== Competitive History ==
Year	Event	CQ	DS	GS	AA	GRP
2005	East Asian Games	1st place, gold medalist(s)	?	?	2nd place, silver medalist(s)	3rd place, bronze medalist(s)
2005	World Championships	7	2nd place, silver medalist(s)	3rd place, bronze medalist(s)		13
2006	Asian Games	3	5	2	2nd place, silver medalist(s)	
2007	World Championships	5	2nd place, silver medalist(s)	1st place, gold medalist(s)		
2008	Olympic Games (unofficial)		2	2	2nd place, silver medalist(s)	
2008	Asian Championships	2nd place, silver medalist(s)	2nd place, silver medalist(s)	3rd place, bronze medalist(s)		
2009	East Asian Games	1st place, gold medalist(s)	?	?	2nd place, silver medalist(s)	
2009	World Championships	2nd place, silver medalist(s)	1st place, gold medalist(s)	2nd place, silver medalist(s)		
2010	World Combat Games	1st place, gold medalist(s)				
2010	Asian Games		1	1	1st place, gold medalist(s)	
2011	World Championships	2nd place, silver medalist(s)	2nd place, silver medalist(s)	1st place, gold medalist(s)		
2012	Asian Championships	?	1st place, gold medalist(s)	3rd place, bronze medalist(s)		
2013	East Asian Games	1st place, gold medalist(s)	?	?	1st place, gold medalist(s)	3rd place, bronze medalist(s)
2013	World Championships	4	5	1st place, gold medalist(s)		9
2014	Asian Games	2nd place, silver medalist(s)				

== Honours ==
Awarded by the Macau SAR Government

- Honourific Title of Merit: 2005
- Sports Merit Medal: 2007
- Silver Lotus Medal of Honour: 2013

Macau Outstanding Athletes Election

- Honorary Athletes Awards: Elected 2007, 2009, 2011, 2013
- Most Popular Athletes: Bronze Award (2011)

== See also ==
- List of Asian Games medalists in wushu
- Macau at the Asian Games
