= Ehsan Peighambari =

Iranian wushu practitioner

Personal information
- Born: April 6, 1988 (age 38) Mashhad, Iran
- Height: 172 cm (5 ft 8 in)
- Weight: 59 kg (130 lb)

Sport
- Sport: Wushu
- Events: Changquan, Daoshu, Gunshu
Medal record
Representing Iran
Men's Wushu Taolu
Olympic Games (unofficial)
Bronze medal – third place	2008 Beijing	Changquan
World Combat Games
Silver medal – second place	2010 Beijing	Daoshu+Gunshu
World Championships
Gold medal – first place	2009 Toronto	Duilian
Asian Games
Bronze medal – third place	2010 Guangzhou	Changquan
Islamic Solidarity Games
Bronze medal – third place	2013 Palembang	Changquan

Ehsan Peighambari (Persian: احسان پیغمبری) is a wushu taolu athlete from Iran. At the 2010 Asian Games in Guangzhou, China, he became the first Iranian athlete to win a medal in wushu taolu, having won the bronze medal in men's changquan. He also won a bronze medal in men's changquan at the 2008 Beijing Wushu Tournament, a silver medal in daoshu and gunshu combined at the 2010 World Combat Games, and a bronze medal in changquan at the 2013 Islamic Solidarity Games. He also won the gold medal in duilian at the 2009 World Wushu Championships.

== See also ==
- List of Asian Games medalists in wushu
