= Erika Kojima =

Japanese wushu practitioner

Personal information
- Nationality: Japanese
- Born: 4 October 1988 (age 37) Shiga Prefecture, Japan
- Height: 152 cm (5 ft 0 in)
- Weight: 54 kg (119 lb)

Sport
- Sport: Wushu
- Event(s): Nanquan, Nandao, Nangun
Medal record
Representing Japan
Women's Wushu Taolu
Olympic Games (unofficial)
Silver medal – second place	2008 Beijing	Nanquan
World Games
Silver medal – second place	2009 Kaohsiung	Nanquan
World Championships
Gold medal – first place	2011 Ankara	Nangun
Silver medal – second place	2007 Beijing	Nandao
Bronze medal – third place	2005 Hanoi	Nanquan
World Cup
Silver medal – second place	2016 Fuzhou	Nandao
Bronze medal – third place	2016 Fuzhou	Nanquan
Bronze medal – third place	2016 Fuzhou	Nangun
Asian Championships
Silver medal – second place	2008 Macau	Nanquan
East Asian Games
Gold medal – first place	2013 Tianjin	Nanquan
Silver medal – second place	2005 Macau	Nanquan

Erika Kojima (小嶋 絵里香; born 4 October 1988) is a former wushu taolu athlete from Japan. She won the silver medal at the 2008 Beijing Wushu Tournament, that was held in tandem with the 2008 Summer Olympics, in the women's nanquan event. She won the bronze medal at the 2005 World Wushu Championships, the silver medal at the 2007 World Wushu Championships and became a world champion at the 2011 World Wushu Championships. At the 2009 World Games she won the silver medal. At the 2005 East Asian Games she won the silver medal and became champion at the 2013 East Asian Games.
