= Mohammed Al-Ashwal =

Yemeni wushu martial artist

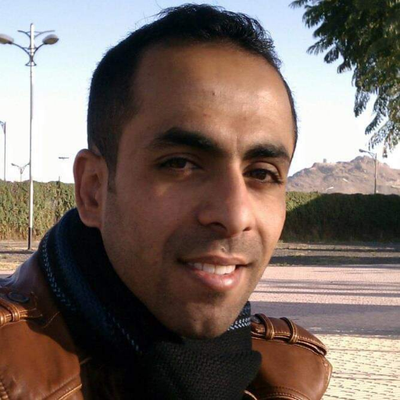
Mohammed Alashwal's photo

Mohammed Hussein Al-Ashwal is a Yemeni Wushu martial artist. He won bronze medals in the men's 48 kg sanshou category at both the 2003 and 2005 World Wushu championships.

== International achievements ==
- 2003: the Bronze Medalist in the 7th World Wushu Championships Macau, China
- 2004: the Silver Medalist of the 2nd Sanshou World Cup, Guanzhou, China
- 2004:the Bronze Medalist in the 6th Asian Wushu Championships, Yangon, Myanmar (Burma)
- 2005 Gold Medalist in the 3rd Arab Wushu Championships, Amman, Jordan.
- 2005: Bronze Medalist in the 8th World Wushu Championships Hanoi, Vietnam
- 2006 the Bronze Medalist in the 3rd Sanshou World Cup, Shi'an, China
- 2008: Gold Medalist in the 2nd Arab Wushu Championships for Clubs, Jordan, Aman
- 2008: the Bronze Medalist in the 7th Asian Wushu Championships, Macau, China.

== Website and social Media account ==
https://www.facebook.com/mohammed.h.alashwal/
