= Kan Wencong =

Chinese wushu practitioner

Personal information
- National team: China
- Born: 1992 (age 33–34) Cang County, Cangzhou, Hebei, China
- Occupation(s): Martial artist, athlete

Sport
- Sport: Wushu
- Event(s): Changquan, Jianshu, Qiangshu
- Team: Hebei Wushu Team; China Wushu Team
Medal record
Women's Wushu Taolu
Representing China
World Championships
| Gold medal – first place | 2011 Ankara | Jianshu |
| Gold medal – first place | 2013 Kuala Lumpur | Jianshu |
Asian Games
| Gold medal – first place | 2010 Guangzhou | Jianshu+Qiangshu |
| Gold medal – first place | 2014 Incheon | Changquan |
Asian Junior Championships
| Gold medal – first place | 2007 Yeongju | Jianshu |

Kan Wencong (Chinese: 阚文聪; pinyin: Kàn Wéncōng) is a retired professional wushu taolu athlete from China. She is a two-time world champion, double gold medalist at the Asian Games, and a one-time Asian junior champion.

== See also ==
- List of Asian Games medalists in wushu
