= Daisuke Ichikizaki =

Japanese wushu practitioner

Personal information
- Born: February 25, 1987 (age 39) Osaka, Japan
- Education: Osaka University of Health and Sport Sciences

Sport
- Sport: Wushu
- Event(s): Changquan, Daoshu, Gunshu
- Team: Japan Wushu Team
Medal record
Representing Japan
Men's Wushu Taolu
World Games
Silver medal – second place	2009 Kaohsiung	Changquan
World Combat Games
Silver medal – second place	2010 Beijing	Changquan
World Championships
Silver medal – second place	2013 Kuala Lumpur	Gunshu
Silver medal – second place	2015 Jakarta	Changquan
Bronze medal – third place	2005 Hanoi	Changquan
Bronze medal – third place	2009 Toronto	Changquan
Bronze medal – third place	2011 Ankara	Gunshu
Asian Games
Silver medal – second place	2010 Guangzhou	Changquan
Bronze medal – third place	2014 Incheon	Changquan
Asian Championships
Silver medal – second place	2008 Macau	Gunshu
Silver medal – second place	2012 Ho Chi Minh City	Changquan
Bronze medal – third place	2012 Ho Chi Minh City	Daoshu
East Asian Games
Silver medal – second place	2009 Hong Kong	Changquan
Bronze medal – third place	2013 Tianjin	Changquan

Daisuke Ichikizaki (Japanese: 市来崎大祐; born February 25, 1987) is a former wushu taolu athlete from Japan. Through many of his international victories, he has established himself as one of Japan's most renowned wushu athletes of all time.

== Career ==
Ichikizaki started wushu training at the age of six. His first major international appearance was at the 2005 World Wushu Championships in Hanoi, Vietnam, where he earned a bronze medal in changquan. He then competed in the men's daoshu and gunshu combined event at the 2005 East Asian Games and won the bronze medal. A year later, he competed at the 2006 Asian Games in Doha, Qatar, and finished eighth overall in men's changquan. Ichikizaki's high placements at the 2007 World Wushu Championships in Beijing, China, qualified him for the men's changquan event at the 2008 Beijing Wushu Tournament. At the competition, he fell short of the bronze medal position by 0.01. His next appearance was at the 2009 World Games in Kaohsiung, Chinese Taipei, where he won the silver medal in changquan. A few months later, he appeared at the 2009 World Wushu Championships in Toronto, Canada, and won a bronze medal once again in changquan. Shortly after, he won the silver medal in men's changquan at the 2009 East Asian Games in Hong Kong.

Ichikizaki's next competition was at the 2010 World Combat Games in Beijing, China, where he won the silver medal in men's changquan. Near the end of the year, he competed in the 2010 Asian Games in Guangzhou, China, and won the first medal for the Japanese delegation at the games which was a silver medal in men's changquan. A year later, Ichikizaki competed at the 2011 World Wushu Championships and won a bronze medal in gunshu.

Two years later, he competed in the 2013 World Wushu Championships and won his first silver medal at the WWC which was in gunshu. Shortly after, Ichikizaki competed in the 2013 East Asian Games in Tianjin, China, A year later, he competed in the 2014 Asian Games in Incheon, South Korea, and won the bronze medal in men's changquan which was also the first medal for Japan at the games. As his last competition, he appeared at the 2015 World Wushu Championships in Jakarta. Indonesia, and won a silver medal in changquan.

== See also ==
- List of Asian Games medalists in wushu
