= Cao Jing =

Chinese wushu practitioner

Personal information
- Born: January 1, 1982 (age 44) Binzhou, Shandong, China

Sport
- Sport: Wushu
- Event(s): Changquan, Daoshu, Gunshu
- Team: Shandong Wushu Team
- Coached by: Yang Xiaohua
- Retired: 2009
Medal record
Representing China
Women's Wushu Taolu
World Championships
Gold medal – first place	2003 Macau	Changquan
Gold medal – first place	2005 Hanoi	Changquan
Gold medal – first place	2007 Beijing	Daoshu
Asian Championships
Gold medal – first place	2008 Macau	Daoshu

Cao Jing (Chinese: 曹静; pinyin: Cáo jìng; born 1982) is a retired professional wushu taolu athlete from China.

== Career ==
Cao's first international debut was at the 2003 World Wushu Championships where she was the world champion in women's changquan. Around this time, Cao became the coach of the Shandong Wushu Team. She was then the world champion once again in changquan two years later at the 2005 World Wushu Championships. Later in the same year, she won the gold medal in women's daoshu and gunshu combined at the 2005 National Games of China. She then won gold medals in daoshu at the 2007 World Wushu Championships and the 2008 Asian Wushu Championships. Her last competition was at the 2009 National Games of China and was able to achieve a gold medal victory once again in women's daoshu and gunshu combined.
