= Cui Wenjuan =

Chinese wushu practitioner

Personal information
- Born: 27 July 1982 (age 43) Changzhou, Hebei, China

Sport
- Sport: Wushu
- Event(s): Taijiquan, Taijijian
- Team: People's Liberation Army
Medal record
Women's Wushu Taolu
Representing China
Olympic Games (unofficial)
Gold medal – first place	2008 Beijing	Taijiquan+Taijijian
World Games
Gold medal – first place	2009 Kaohsiung	Taijiquan+Taijijian
World Championships
Gold medal – first place	2007 Beijing	Taijijian
Asian Championships
Gold medal – first place	2008 Macau	Taijiquan
East Asian Games
Gold medal – first place	2009 Hong Kong	Taijiquan+Taijijian

Cui Wenjuan (Chinese: 崔文娟; born 27 July 1982) is a retired wushu taolu athlete and member of the People's Liberation Army.

== Career ==
Cui made her international debut at the 2007 World Wushu Championships where she became the world champion in taijijian. A year later, she competed in the 2008 Asian Wushu Championships and won a gold medal in taijiquan. This was in preparation for the 2008 Beijing Wushu Tournament, where she won the gold medal in women's taijiquan. She became world champion at the 2007 World Wushu Championships. Cui then was a gold medalist in taijiquan and taijijian combined at the 2009 World Games and also at the 2009 National Games of China. Her last competition was at the 2009 East Asian Games where she won another gold medal in taijiquan and taijijian combined.

== See also ==
- China national wushu team
