= Jayden Yuan =

Chinese wushu athlete (born 1988)

Personal information
- Born: Yuan Xiaochao; 7 August 1988 (age 38) Heze, Shandong, China
- Occupations: Martial artist, athlete, actor

Sport
- Sport: Wushu
- Events: Changquan, Daoshu, Gunshu
- Team: Shanxi Wushu Team (-2010)
Medal record
Representing China
Men's Wushu Taolu
Olympic Games (unofficial)
Gold medal – first place	2008 Beijing	Changquan
World Games
Gold medal – first place	2009 Kaohsiung	Changquan
World Championships
Gold medal – first place	2005 Hanoi	Changquan
Gold medal – first place	2007 Beijing	Changquan
Asian Games
Gold medal – first place	2006 Doha	CQ All-Around
Gold medal – first place	2010 Guangzhou	Changquan
Asian Championships
Gold medal – first place	2008 Macau	Changquan
East Asian Games
Bronze medal – third place	2005 Macau	Changquan

"Jayden" Yuan Xiaochao (Chinese: 袁曉超; pinyin: Yuánxiǎochāo; born 7 August 1988) is a retired professional wushu taolu athlete and actor from China. He was a world champion in 2005 and 2007.

== Career ==
=== Competitive wushu ===
Yuan started to practice martial arts in Songjiang Martial Arts School in 1998 and later joined the Shanxi Provincial Wushu Team.

Yuan's international debut was at the 2005 East Asian Games where he won a bronze medal in changquan. At the 2005 World Wushu Championships he became the world champion in changquan. Later in the year, he competed in the 2005 National Games of China and won the gold medal in men's daoshu and gunshu combined. Yuan then competed in the 2006 Asian Games and won the gold medal in men's changquan all-around. He again became the world champion in changquan at the 2007 World Wushu Championships. This qualified him for the 2008 Beijing Wushu Tournament where he won the gold medal in men's changquan. He won yet another gold medal in men's changquan at the 2009 World Games. Yuan then competed in the 2009 National Games of China and was a double silver medalist in changquan and daoshu/gunshu combined. His last international competition was the 2010 Asian Games where he won the gold medal in men's changquan.

=== Acting ===
After retiring from competitive wushu taolu, he adopted the English name Jayden. He starred in the Chinese 3D martial arts film Tai Chi 0 (2012) and its sequel Tai Chi Hero (2012).

== Personal life ==
Yuan's uncles include Yuan Wenqing and Yuan Xindong, both of whom were also on the Shanxi wushu team.

== See also ==
- List of Asian Games medalists in wushu
- China national wushu team
