= Ma Lingjuan =

Chinese wushu practitioner

Personal information
- Born: 15 February 1987 (age 39) Chuzhou, Anhui, China
- Height: 1.65 m (5 ft 5 in)

Sport
- Sport: Wushu
- Events: Changquan, Jianshu, Qiangshu
- Team: Anhui Wushu Team (1997–2009); Beijing Wushu Team (2009–2012)
- Coached by: Fang Jian
Medal record
Women's Wushu Taolu
Representing China
Olympic Games (unofficial)
Gold medal – first place	2008 Beijing	Jianshu+Qiangshu
World Games
Gold medal – first place	2009 Kaohsiung	Jianshu+Qiangshu
World Championships
Gold medal – first place	2005 Hanoi	Qiangshu
Gold medal – first place	2007 Beijing	Qiangshu
Asian Games
Gold medal – first place	2006 Doha	CQ All-Around
Asian Championships
Gold medal – first place	2004 Yangon	Qiangshu
Gold medal – first place	2008 Macau	Qiangshu

Ma Lingjuan (Chinese: 马灵娟; pinyin: Mǎlíngjuān; born February 15, 1987), is a retired professional wushu taolu athlete from Anhui. She is a two-time world champion and Asian champion, and a gold medalist at the 2006 Asian Games, 2008 Beijing Wushu Tournament, and the World Games.

== Career ==
Ma started training wushu in 1993 at the age of five. In 1997, she was transferred to the Anhui Provincial Wushu Team.

Ma's first major international debut was at the 2004 Asian Wushu Championships where she won the gold medal in qiangshu. She then competed in the 2005 World Wushu Championships in Hanoi, Vietnam where she became the world champion in the same event. A year later, she competed in the 2006 Asian Games in Doha, Qatar, and won the gold medal in the women's changquan all-around event. Almost a year later, she competed in the 2007 World Wushu Championships in Beijing and won once again in qiangshu. This qualified Ma for the 2008 Beijing Wushu Tournament where she won in the women's jianshu and qiangshu combined event. Her last major international competition was at the 2009 World Games in Kaohsiung, Taiwan, where she won in the same event. Shortly after, she won the gold medal by 0.01 points in women's jianshu and qiangshu at the 2009 National Games of China in Shandong, thus achieving the "grand slam" of wushu.

== See also ==
- List of Asian Games medalists in wushu
