= 2008 Beijing Wushu Tournament – Women's jianshu and qiangshu =

Women's jianshu and qiangshu at the 2008 Beijing Wushu Tournament
- Venue: Olympic Sports Center Gymnasium
- Dates: 21-22 August
- Competitors: 7 from 7 nations

Medalists
gold medal	Ma Lingjuan	China
silver medal	Han Jing	Macau
bronze medal	Nguyễn Mai Phương	Vietnam

The women's jianshu / qiangshu all-around competition at the 2008 Beijing Wushu Tournament was held from August 21 to 22 at the Olympic Sports Center Gymnasium.

== Schedule ==
All times are Beijing Time (UTC+08:00)

Date	Time	Event
Thursday, 21 August, 2008	10:06	Qiangshu
Friday, 22 August, 2008	10:26	Jianshu

== Results ==
Both events were judged without the degree of difficulty component.

Rank	Athlete	Qiangshu	Jianshu	Total
1	Ma Lingjuan (CHN)	9.85	9.75	19.60
2	Han Jing (MAC)	9.65	9.65	19.30
3	Nguyễn Mai Phương (VIE)	9.55	9.60	19.15
4	Chen Shao-Chi (TPE)	9.50	9.59	19.09
5	Evgeniya Ragulina (KAZ)	9.44	9.50	18.94
6	Tenyia Lee (USA)	9.41	9.49	18.90
7	Ng Xinni (SIN)	9.42	9.22	18.64
