= Ai Uchida =

Japanese wushu practitioner

Personal information
- Born: Ai Miyaoka 宮岡愛; November 24, 1984 (age 41) Kanagawa, Japan
- Height: 1.53 m (5 ft 0 in)
- Weight: 49 kg (108 lb)

Sport
- Sport: Wushu
- Event(s): Taijiquan, Taijijian
- Team: Japan Wushu Team
Medal record
Representing Japan
Women's Wushu Taolu
Olympic Games (unofficial)
Bronze medal – third place	2008 Beijing	Taijiquan+Taijijian
World Combat Games
Silver medal – second place	2010 Beijing	Taijiquan+Taijijian
World Championships
Silver medal – second place	2009 Toronto	Taijiquan
Silver medal – second place	2011 Ankara	Taijijian
Silver medal – second place	2013 Kuala Lumpur	Taijijian
Bronze medal – third place	2007 Beijing	Taijiquan
Bronze medal – third place	2007 Beijing	Taijijian
Bronze medal – third place	2011 Ankara	Taijiquan
Asian Games
Silver medal – second place	2006 Doha	Taijiquan+Taijijian
Silver medal – second place	2010 Guangzhou	Taijiquan+Taijijian
Bronze medal – third place	2014 Incheon	Taijiquan+Taijijian
Asian Championships
Gold medal – first place	2012 Ho Chi Minh City	Taijiquan
Silver medal – second place	2008 Macau	Taijiquan
Silver medal – second place	2008 Macau	Taijijian
Silver medal – second place	2012 Ho Chi Minh City	Taijijian
Asian Junior Championships
Bronze medal – third place	2001 Hanoi	Taijiquan

Ai Uchida (Japanese: 宮岡•愛; born: November 24, 1984), previously known as Ai Miyaoka, is a former wushu taolu and taijiquan athlete from Japan. She was a multiple-time medalist at the World Wushu Championships and the Asian Games, and also won the bronze medal in women's taijiquan at the 2008 Beijing Wushu Tournament. She is Japan's most renowned wushu athlete at the Asian Games.

== See also ==
- List of Asian Games medalists in wushu
