= Diana Bong =

Malaysian wushu practitioners

Personal information
- Born: Bong Siong Lin; 5 September 1985 (age 40) Kuching, Sarawak
- Height: 149 cm (4 ft 11 in)
- Weight: 44 kg (97 lb)

Sport
- Sport: Wushu
- Event(s): Nanquan, Nandao, Nangun
- Team: Malaysia Wushu Team
- Retired: January 2019
Medal record
Representing Malaysia
Women's Wushu Taolu
Olympic Games (unofficial)
Bronze medal – third place	2008 Beijing	Nanquan+Nandao
World Games
Bronze medal – third place	2013 Cali	Nanquan+Nandao
World Championships
Gold medal – first place	2013 Kuala Lumpur	Nandao
Silver medal – second place	2007 Beijing	Nanquan
Silver medal – second place	2011 Ankara	Nanquan
Silver medal – second place	2013 Kuala Lumpur	Nangun
Silver medal – second place	2015 Jakarta	Nanquan
Bronze medal – third place	2009 Toronto	Nangun
Bronze medal – third place	2011 Ankara	Nangun
World Cup
Silver medal – second place	2016 Fuzhou	Nangun
Bronze medal – third place	2016 Fuzhou	Nandao
Asian Games
Bronze medal – third place	2006 Doha	Nanquan+Nandao
Asian Championships
Gold medal – first place	2012 Ho Chi Minh City	Nandao
Silver medal – second place	2012 Ho Chi Minh City	Nanquan
Silver medal – second place	2012 Ho Chi Minh City	Nangun
Silver medal – second place	2016 Taoyuan	Nanquan
Silver medal – second place	2016 Taoyuan	Nangun
Southeast Asian Games
Gold medal – first place	2007 Nakhon Ratchasima	Nanquan
Gold medal – first place	2009 Vientianne	Nanquan
Gold medal – first place	2013 Naypyidaw	Nanquan
Gold medal – first place	2017 Kuala Lumpur	Nanquan
Bronze medal – third place	2011 Jakarta	Nandao+Nangun
Bronze medal – third place	2013 Naypyidaw	Nangun

Diana Bong Siong Lin (born 5 September 1985) is a wushu taolu coach and retired athlete from Malaysia.

== Career ==
Bong's first major international victory was at the 2006 Asian Games where she won the bronze medal in women's nanquan. The following year, she was a gold medalist in nanquan at the 2007 Southeast Asian Games and a silver medalist in nanquan at the 2007 World Wushu Championships. She then won the bronze medal in women's nanquan at the 2008 Beijing Wushu Tournament. She then won another gold medal in nanquan at the 2009 Southeast Asian Games and a bronze medal in nangun at the 2009 World Wushu Championships.

In 2011, Bong won a bronze medal in nandao and nangun combined at the 2011 Southeast Asian Games and a silver medal in nanquan and a bronze medal in nangun at the 2011 World Wushu Championships. She then was a gold medalist in nandao and a double silver medalist in nanquan and nangun at the 2012 Asian Wushu Championships. The following year, she won a gold medal in nanquan and a bronze medal in nangun at the 2013 Southeast Asian Games. She also won a bronze medal in nanquan and nandao combined at the 2013 World Games. Then shortly after in the 2013 World Wushu Championships, she became the world champion in nandao and a silver medalist in nangun.

At the 2015 World Wushu Championships, Bong won a silver medal in nanquan. She then won two silver medals in nanquan and nangun at the 2016 Asian Wushu Championships. Her last competition was at the 2017 Southeast Asian Games where she was a gold medalist in nanquan. After her own competitive career. Bong became a wushu coach and judge.

== Honours ==
- Sarawak
  - Gold Medal of the Sarawak Independence Diamond Jubilee Medal (2023)

== See also ==
- List of Asian Games medalists in wushu
