= Ebrahim Fathi =

Iranian wushu athlete

Ebrahim Fathi oregani
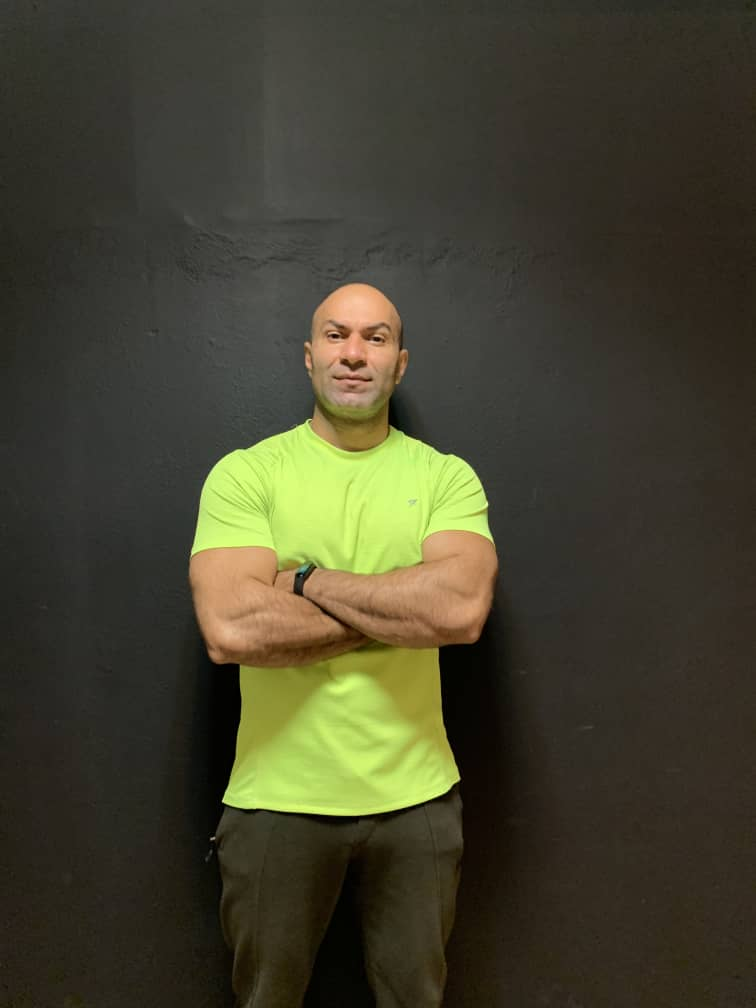

Personal information
- Native name: ابراهیم فتحی
- Nationality: Iranian
- Born: Najafabad, Iran
- Years active: 1996- present

Sport
- Sport: Wushu
Medal record
Representing Iran
Wushu men
Asian Wushu championship 2008 Macau
Gold medal – first place	2008 Macau	Duilian
world Wushu championship 2009 Canada
Gold medal – first place	2009 Canada	Duilian
World Wushu championship 2011 Turkey
Silver medal – second place	2011 Turkey	Duilian
Asian Wushu Championship 2012 Vietnam
Silver medal – second place	2012 Vietnam	Duilian
Islamic Solidarity games 2013 Indonesia
Gold medal – first place	2013 Indonesia	Duilian
World Wushu championship 2013 Malaysia
Gold medal – first place	2013 Malaysia	Duilian
World Wushu championship 2015 Indonesia
Silver medal – second place	2015 Indonesia	Duilian

Ebrahim Fathi oregani (Persian: ابراهیم فتحی; born September 21, 1982) is an Iranian wushu athlete. Ebrahim Fathi with his two teammates of Iran Duilian group, Mohsen Ahmadi and Navid Makvandi, have attended several world championship events and introduced Iran as the first contender of this sub-division in Wushu world.

== Career ==
Ebrahim Fathi started his wushu career at the age of 12. he has won numerous titles of the Duilian in World and Asian Championships including Macau, Canada, Turkey, Indonesia and Malaysia. he was a member of Iran national wushu team that won Asian gold medal at the Asian Championship in Macau for the first time in the history of Iran Taolu Wushu.
