= Yuen Ka Ying =

Hong Kong wushu practitioner

Personal information
- Born: September 12, 1988 (age 38)

Sport
- Sport: Wushu
- Event: Nanquan
- Team: Hong Kong Wushu Team
- Coached by: Lin Hanggui
Medal record
Representing Hong Kong
Women's Wushu Taolu
World Championships
Gold medal – first place	2007 Beijing	Duilian
Gold medal – first place	2015 Jakarta	Duilian
Gold medal – first place	2019 Shanghai	Duilian
Silver medal – second place	2009 Toronto	Nanquan
Silver medal – second place	2009 Toronto	Nandao
Silver medal – second place	2009 Toronto	Duilian
Silver medal – second place	2013 Kuala Lumpur	Duilian
Silver medal – second place	2015 Jakarta	Nangun
Bronze medal – third place	2013 Kuala Lumpur	Nandao
World Cup
Silver medal – second place	2016 Fuzhou	Nanquan
Bronze medal – third place	2016 Fuzhou	Duilian
Asian Games
Bronze medal – third place	2018 Jakarta-Palembang	Nanquan
Asian Championships
Silver medal – second place	2008 Macau	Nandao
Silver medal – second place	2008 Macau	Duilian
Silver medal – second place	2016 Taoyuan	Nandao
Bronze medal – third place	2012 Ho Chi Minh City	Nanquan
East Asian Games
Silver medal – second place	2013 Tianjin	Duilian
World Junior Championships
Silver medal – second place	2006 Kuala Lumpur	Nangun (A)
Bronze medal – third place	2006 Kuala Lumpur	Nanquan (A)
Asian Junior Championships
Silver medal – second place	2005 Singapore	Nandao (A)
Bronze medal – third place	2005 Singapore	Nangun (A)

Yuen Ka Ying (Chinese: 袁家鎣; pinyin: Yuánjiāyíng; born September 12, 1988) is a retired professional wushu taolu athlete from Hong Kong.

== Career ==
=== Junior ===
Yuen made her international debut at the 2005 Asian Junior Wushu Championships in Singapore where she won a silver medal in nandao and a bronze medal in nangun. She then competed in the 2006 World Junior Wushu Championships in Kuala Lumpur, earning another silver (nangun) and bronze (nanquan).

=== Senior ===
Yuen had her senior debut at the 2007 World Wushu Championships in China where he won a gold medal in duilian and a 6th-place finish in nandao and nangun. She then competed in the 2008 Asian Wushu Championships in Macau where she won a silver medal in nandao. She was then a triple silver medalist in nanquan, nandao, and duilian at the 2009 World Wushu Championships in Toronto.

In 2012, Yuen won a bronze medal in nanquan at the Asian Wushu Championships in Hanoi. The following year, she won silver medals in duilian at the 2013 East Asian Games and the 2013 World Wushu Championships in Kuala Lumpur in addition to a bronze medal in nandao at the world championships. At the 2015 World Wushu Championships, she won a gold medal in duilian and a silver medal in nangun, followed by a silver medal in nanquan and a bronze medal in duilian at the 2016 Taolu World Cup. She then competed in the 2018 Asian Games where she won the bronze medal in women's nanquan. Her last competition was at the 2019 World Wushu Championships where she won the gold medal in duilian.

== See also ==
- List of Asian Games medalists in wushu
