= Shandong University of Finance and Economics =

Higher Education Institution in Shandong, China

- 山东财经大学
- Type: Public
- Established: 1952; 74 years ago as Shandong Institute of Finance and Economics, 2011; 15 years ago merged into current university
- President: Zhuo Zhi (卓志)
- Students: around 33,000
- Undergraduates: 31,000
- Postgraduates: 2,000
- Location: Jinan, Shandong, China; 36°40′06″N 117°22′07″E
- Website: www.sdufe.edu.cn

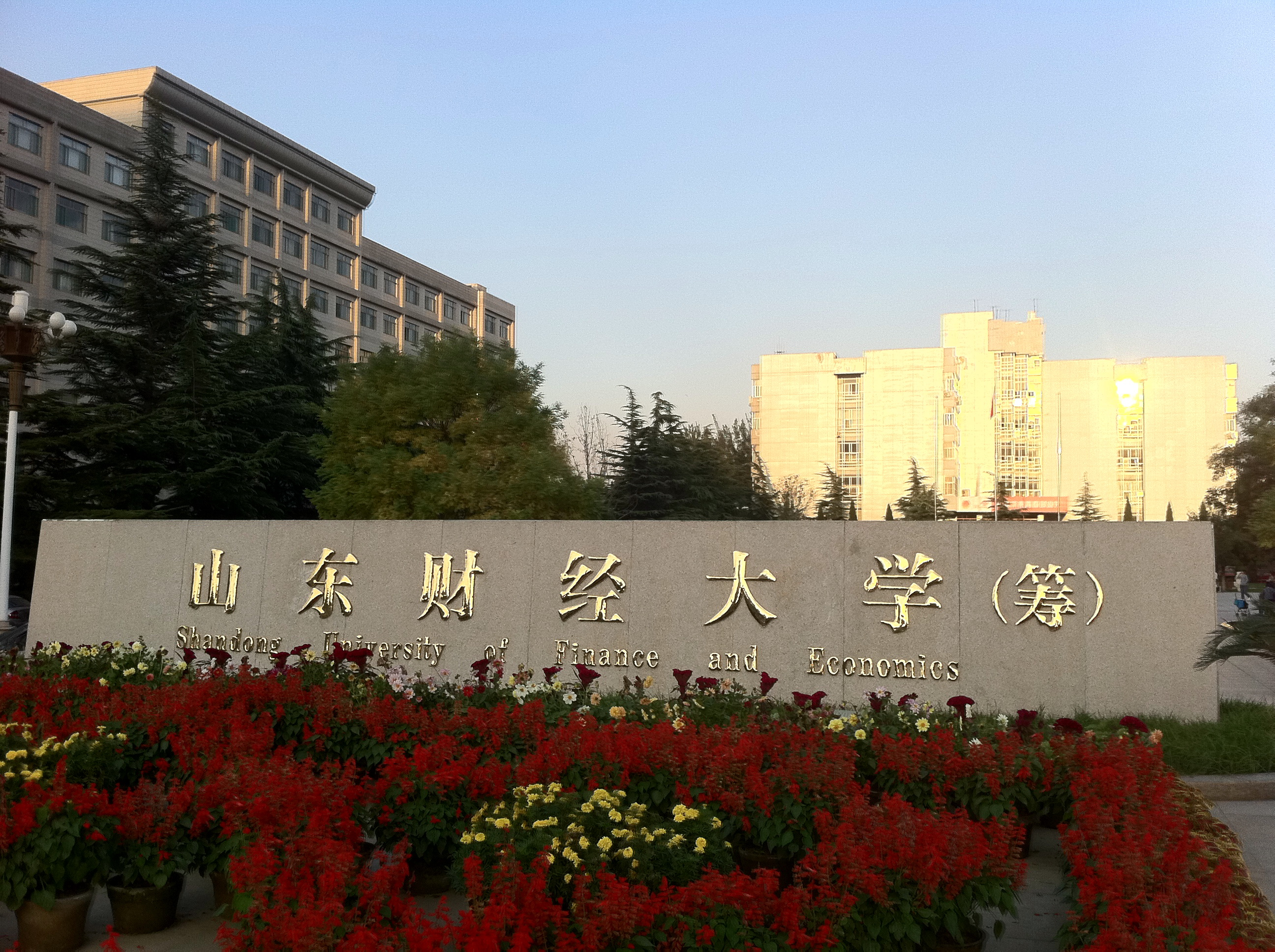
Gate of Shandong University of Finance and Economics (Yanshan campus)

Shandong University of Finance and Economics (Chinese: 山东财经大学) is a public research university in Jinan, Shandong province, China. It is a full-time comprehensive institution of higher education which was founded upon approval by Shandong Provincial Government in 1952 and originally known as Shandong Institute of Finance and Economics. The current university resulted from a merger of two second-tier universities - the Shandong University of Finance (山东财政学院) and the Shandong Economic University (山东经济学院) in 2011.

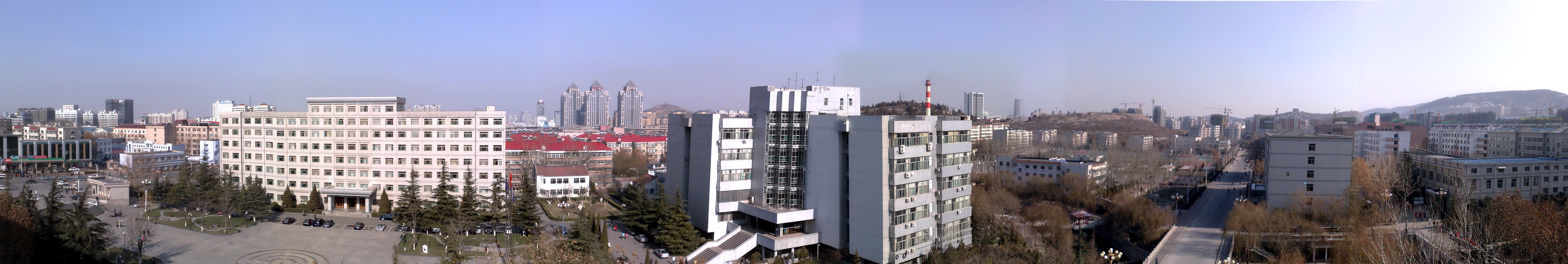
Northeast Panorama of Shandong University of Finance and Economics Yanshan Layout

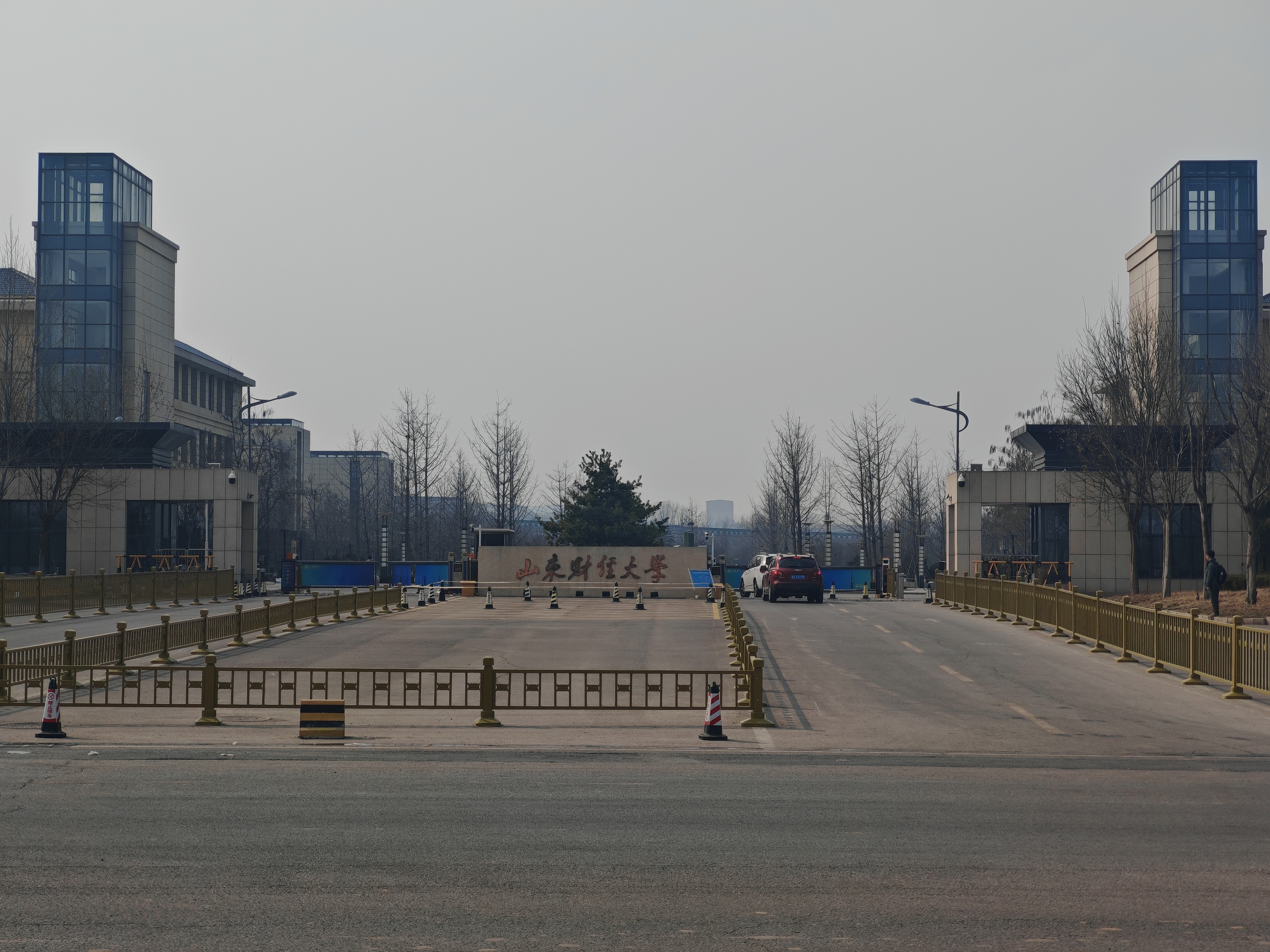
The east gate of Shengjing Campus of Shandong University of Finance and Economics

As of 2025, Shandong University of Finance and Economics has 24 schools offering a total of 58 academic programs. The university primarily focuses on disciplines in economics and management, while promoting coordinated development across multiple fields.

== The former Shandong Economic University ==
Shandong Economic University has an enrolment of 17,000 students, including undergraduates, 3-year associate degree students and postgraduates. Economics and Management are the mainstay of the disciplines. Literature, Law, Science and Engineering are also taught.

The university consists of 16 schools covering 40 undergraduate programs, holds the rights to award the master's degree of first-grade discipline in Applied Economics, Business Administration and Management Science and Engineering, as well as 22 postgraduate programs of secondary disciplines.

Shandong Economic University is qualified to award an MBA and master's degrees for applicants with an educational background that is equivalent to college graduates and to have the specially invited professor posts, Tai Shan Scholar. There are four key provincial disciplines (Accountancy, Information Management and System Engineering, Enterprise Management and Monetary Finance), two key provincial teaching reform and experimental subjects (Accounting, International Economics and Trade), two provincial teaching reform and experimental courses (principle of Management and the basis of Accountancy) and seven provincial excellent courses (Monetary Banking, Western Economics, Western Theory of Economics and Enterprise Financial Management etc.).

The university has 1315 teaching and administrative staff. Among the 940 faculty members, 340 are professors and associate professors, 92 having obtained the degree of PhD, while 116 are studying for that. 75.43 percent of the teachers have the degree of Master or Doctor. Ten are tutors of Ph.D. candidates, 112 are tutors of postgraduates; four professors enjoy Special Grants from the State Council; 11 have been awarded the title of National or Provincial Excellent Teacher; 11 are distinguished with the title of Provincial Leading Talented Professional and 24 with the title of Young Leading Talented Professional and Leader of the Academic Field at university level; 112 have been selected to participate in the "231 Talents Project". 55 are Adjunct and Emeritus Professors from both at home and abroad.

During the past five years, 216 research projects have been undertaken; 25 of these are funded by the State Social Science Foundation, the State Natural Science Foundation, the State Soft Science Research Project or the Ministry of Education; 1 has won a State award; 41 have won awards from Shandong Provincial Government. Additionally, 2546 theses have been published in academic journals at home and abroad. The volume of research funds totals 49.8 million Yuan.

Within Shandong Economic University there are 20 independent research institutes, such as Shandong Regional Economy Research Institute. In 2003, Shandong Economic University had the titles "Provincial Finance Research Base" and "Provincial Business Administration Research Base" conferred upon it by the Publicity Department of Shandong Provincial Government. Shandong Economy, a comprehensive economics theoretical journal directed by Shandong Economic University, and published at home and abroad, is one of the core journals of China Humanities and Social Science Periodical.
