= Ng Shin Yii =

Malaysian wushu practitioner

- Born: 8 January 1989 (age 37); Malacca, Malaysia
- Nationality: Malaysian
- Height: 1.65 m (5 ft 5 in)

Ng Shin Yii

Chinese name
- Traditional Chinese: 黃忻宜
- Simplified Chinese: 黄忻宜
- Hanyu Pinyin: Huáng Xīn Yí
- Pha̍k-fa-sṳ: Vòng Hiûn-ngì
- Jyutping: Wong4 Jan1 Ji4
- Hokkien POJ: N̂g Him-gî
- Tâi-lô: N̂g Him-gî

Ng Shin Yii (born 8 January 1989) (Chinese: 黄忻宜; pinyin: Huáng Xīn Yí; Jyutping: Wong4 Jan1 Ji4; Pe̍h-ōe-jī: N̂g Him-gî; Pha̍k-fa-sṳ: Vòng Hiûn-ngì) is a retired Malaysian wushu athlete. She retired at age 27 from international wushu after competing at the World Taijiquan Championships in Poland. She competed in the Taijiquan and Taijijian taolu events. Up until her retirement in 2016, she had represented Malaysia in every World Wushu Championships since 2009, winning one silver and one bronze in the 2009 and 2015 Championships respectively. She competed in the first two World Taijiquan Championships in Dujiangyan and Warsaw achieving three silver medals. At the age of 17, she won a bronze medal at the 2006 Asian Games in Doha, Qatar.
