= Chinese sword =

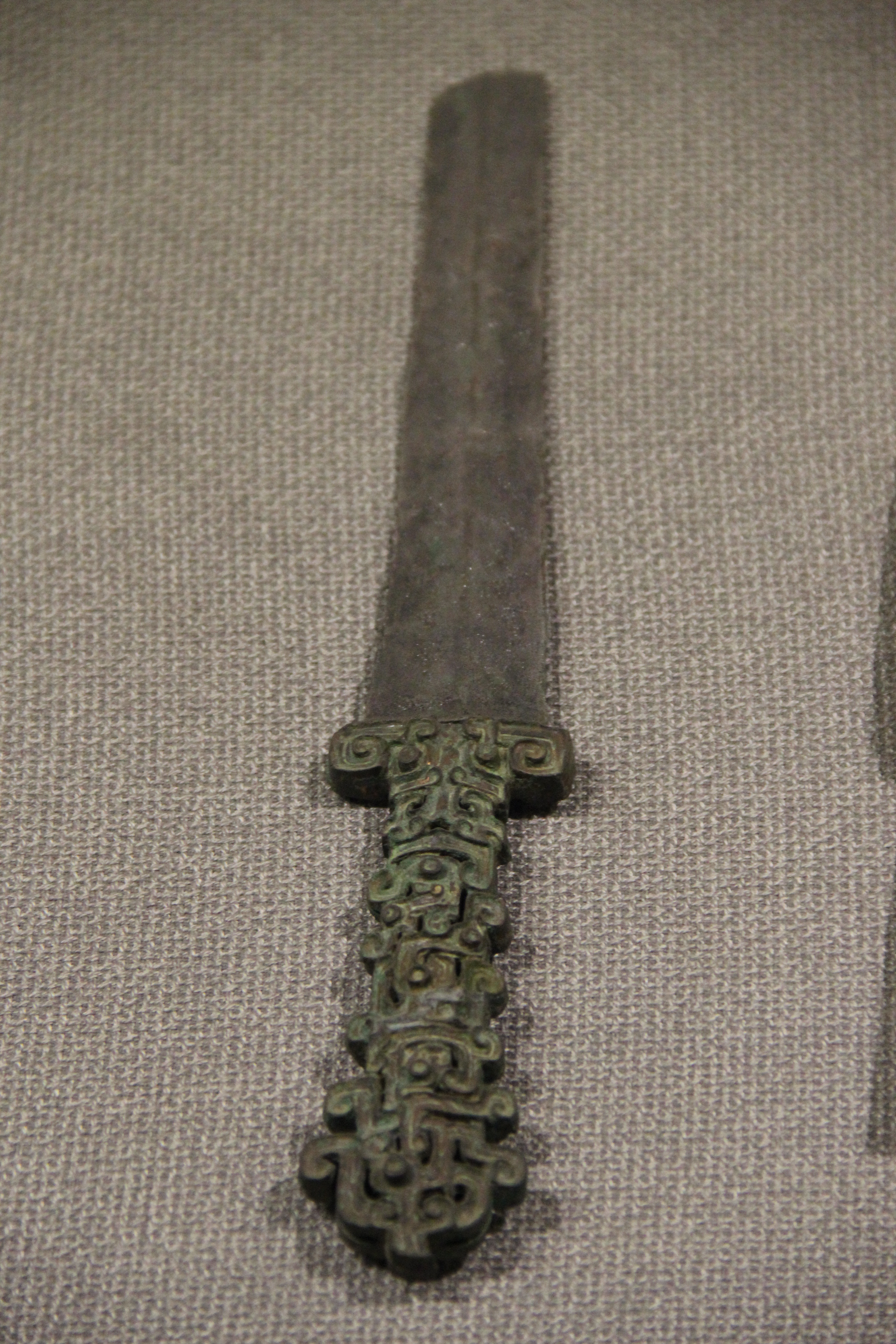
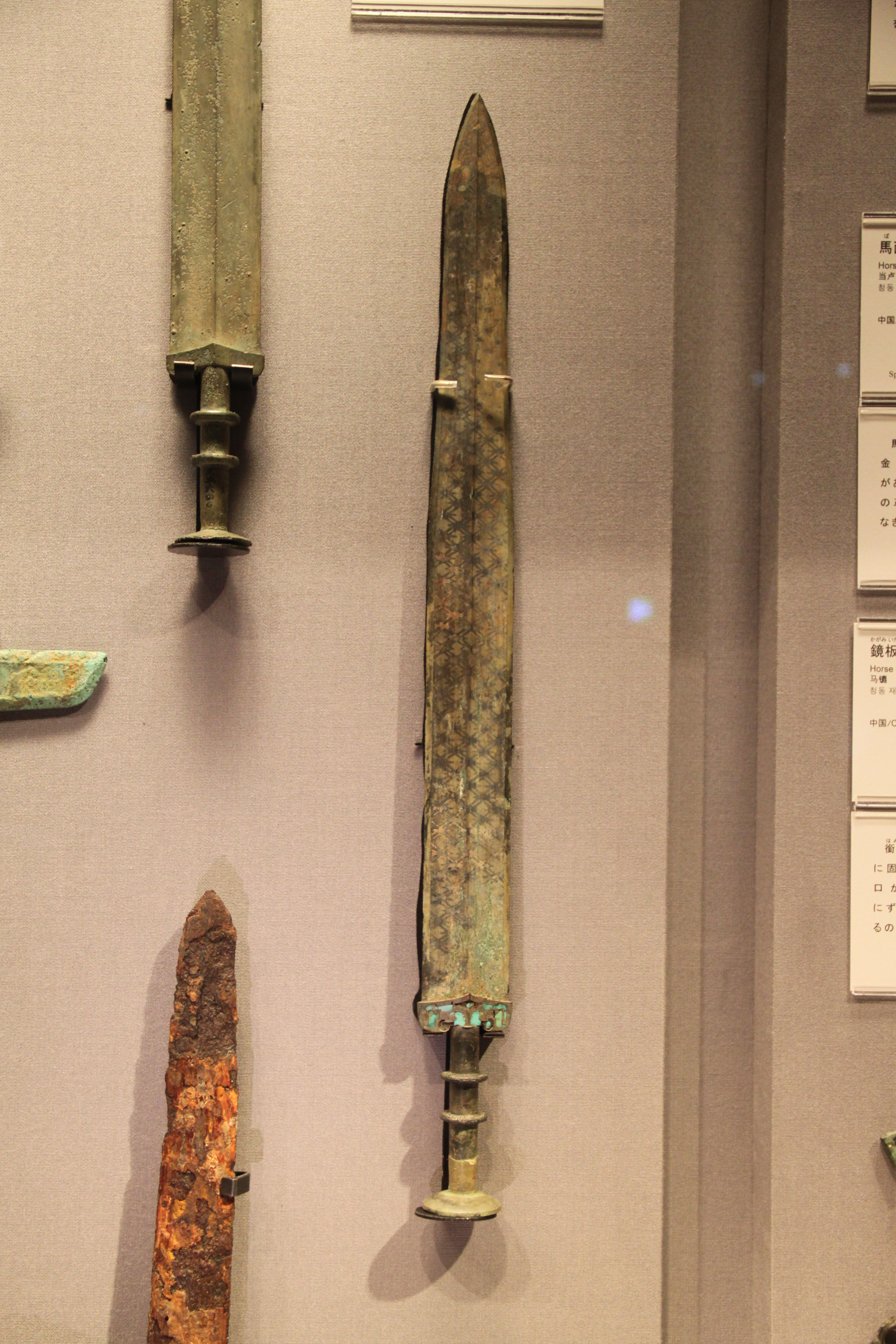
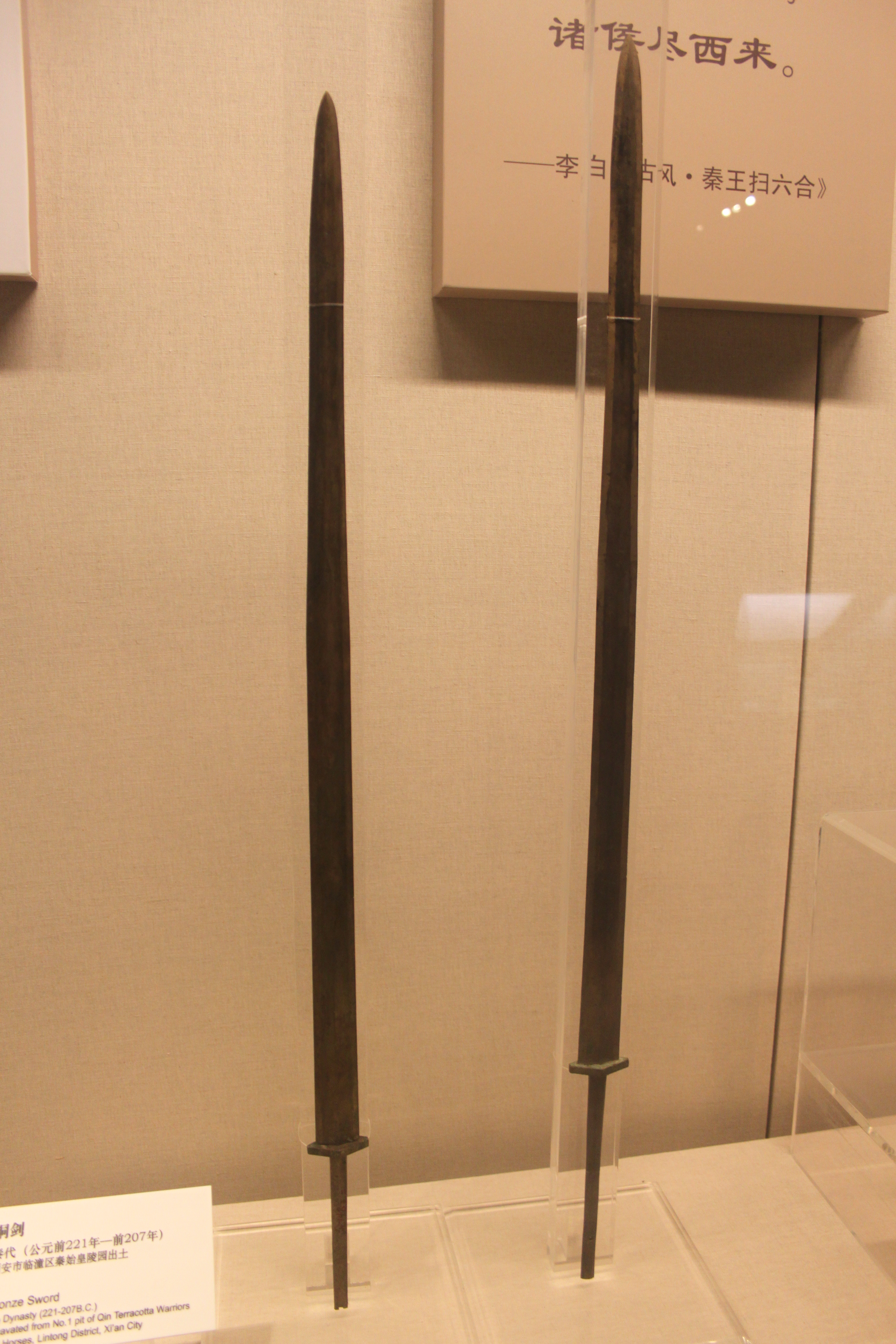
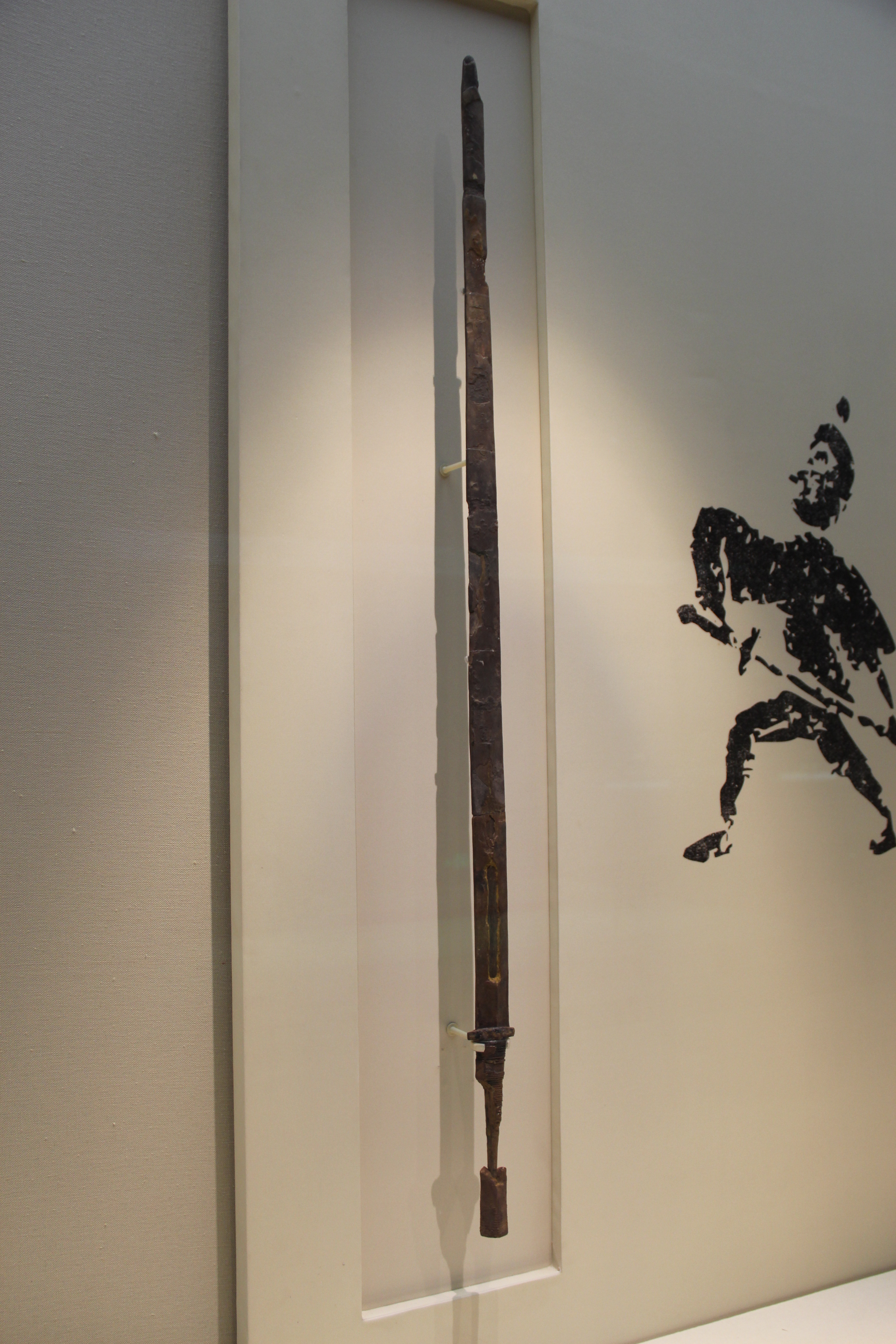
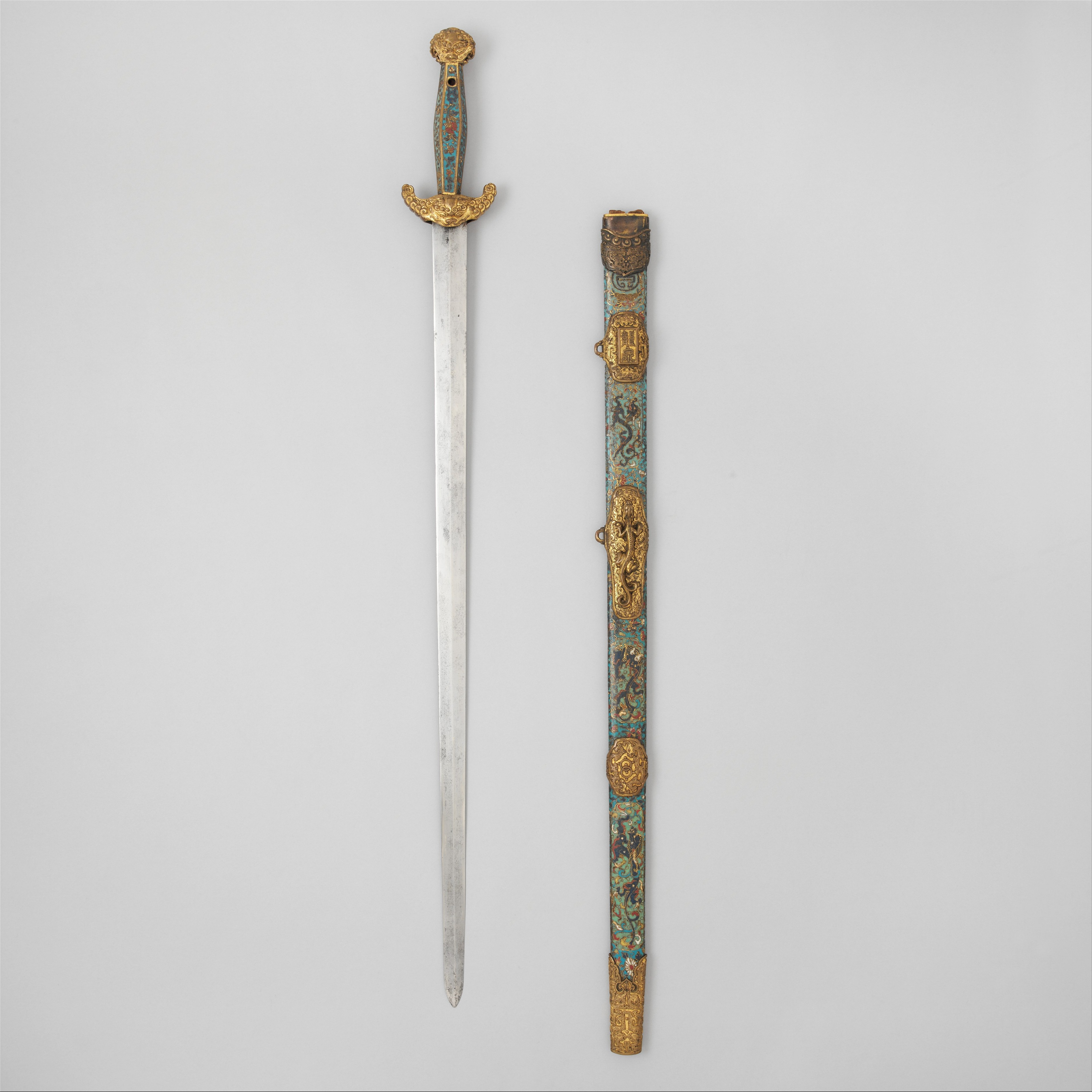
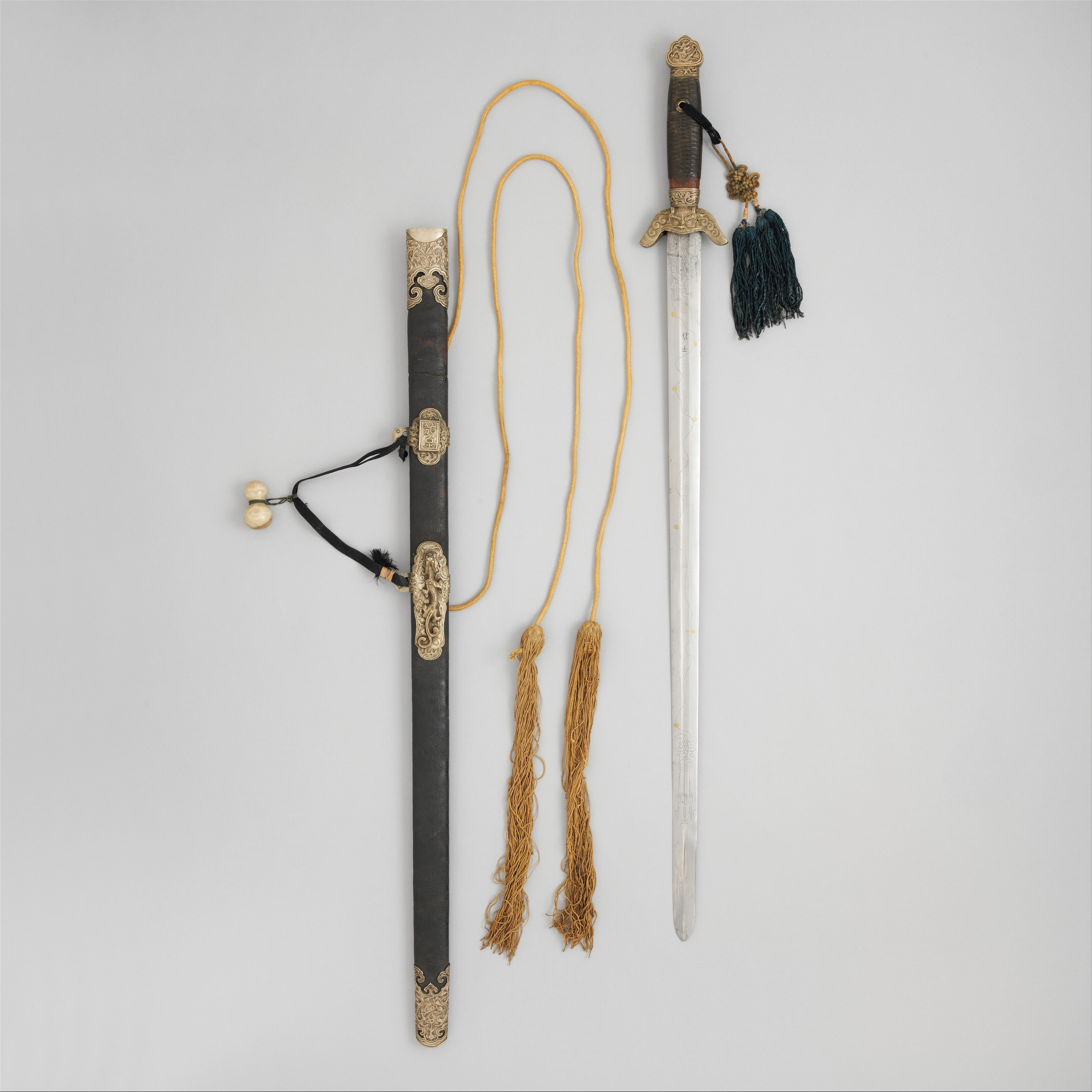
Spring and Autumn period jian, Warring States jian, Qin dynasty jians, Han dynasty jian, Ming dynasty jian, Qing dynasty jian

Historically, Chinese swords are classified into two types, the jian and the dao. A Jian is a straight, double-edged sword mainly used for stabbing; the term has been commonly translated into the English language as a longsword. Meanwhile, a dao is a single-edged sword (mostly curved from the Song dynasty forward) mainly used for cutting, and the term has been translated as a saber or a "knife".

Bronze jians appeared during the Western Zhou period and switched to the more durable wrought iron and steel during the late Warring States period. In modern times, the ceremonial commissioned officer's sword of the Chinese navy has been patterned after the traditional jian since 2008. In contemporary martial arts practice, the historical jian is most widely preserved as the unsharpened taijijian (commonly referred to in English as the tai chi sword), which typically uses a tempered semi flexible 2Cr13 stainless steel or spring steel blade weighing 590 to 630 grams (1.30 to 1.39 pounds) balanced 6.0 to 9.0 centimeters (2.4 to 3.5 inches) in front of the guard for solo form training. Besides specialty weapons like the butterfly dao, Chinese swords are usually 70–110 cm (28–43 in) in length. However, longer swords have been found on occasion.

Outside of Ancient China, Chinese swords were also used in Ancient Japan from the 3rd to the 6th century AD, but they were succeeded by native Japanese swords by the middle Heian era.

== Bronze age: Shang dynasty (c. 1200 BC–c. 1046 BC) to Spring and Autumn period (771–476 BC) ==
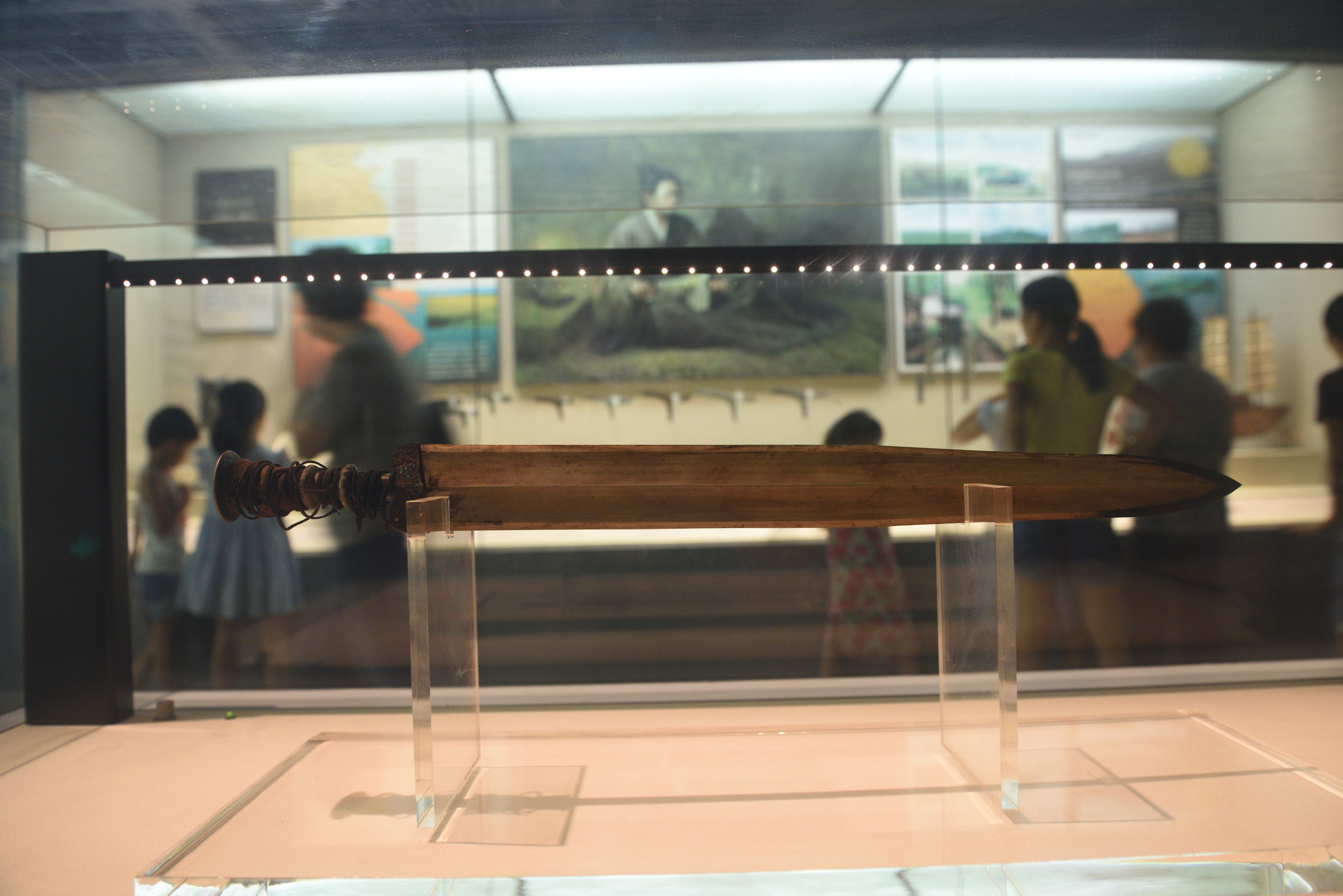
Jian of Yue king Zhezhi Yuyi

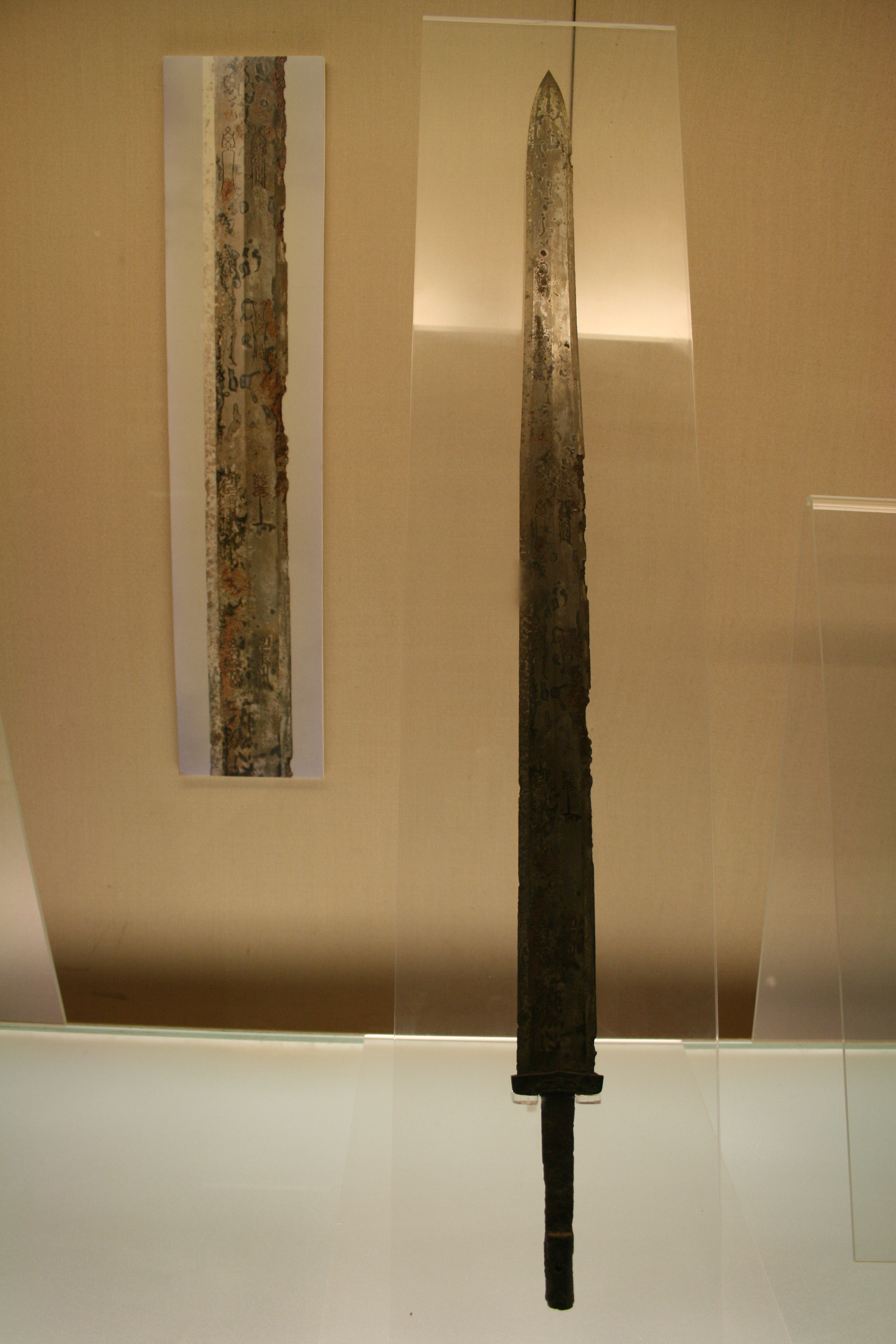
Sword of Helü of Wu

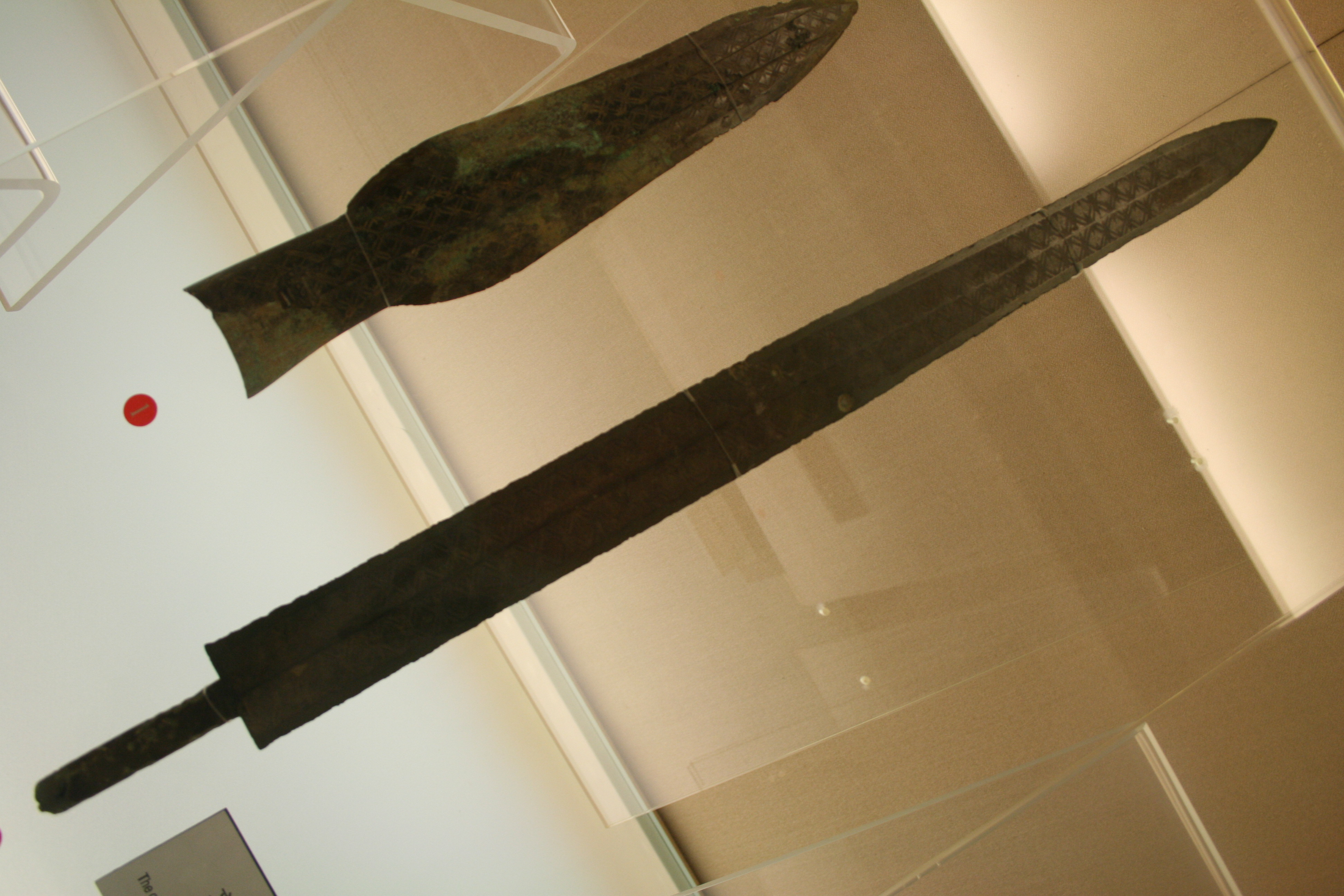
Late Spring and Autumn period spear and sword

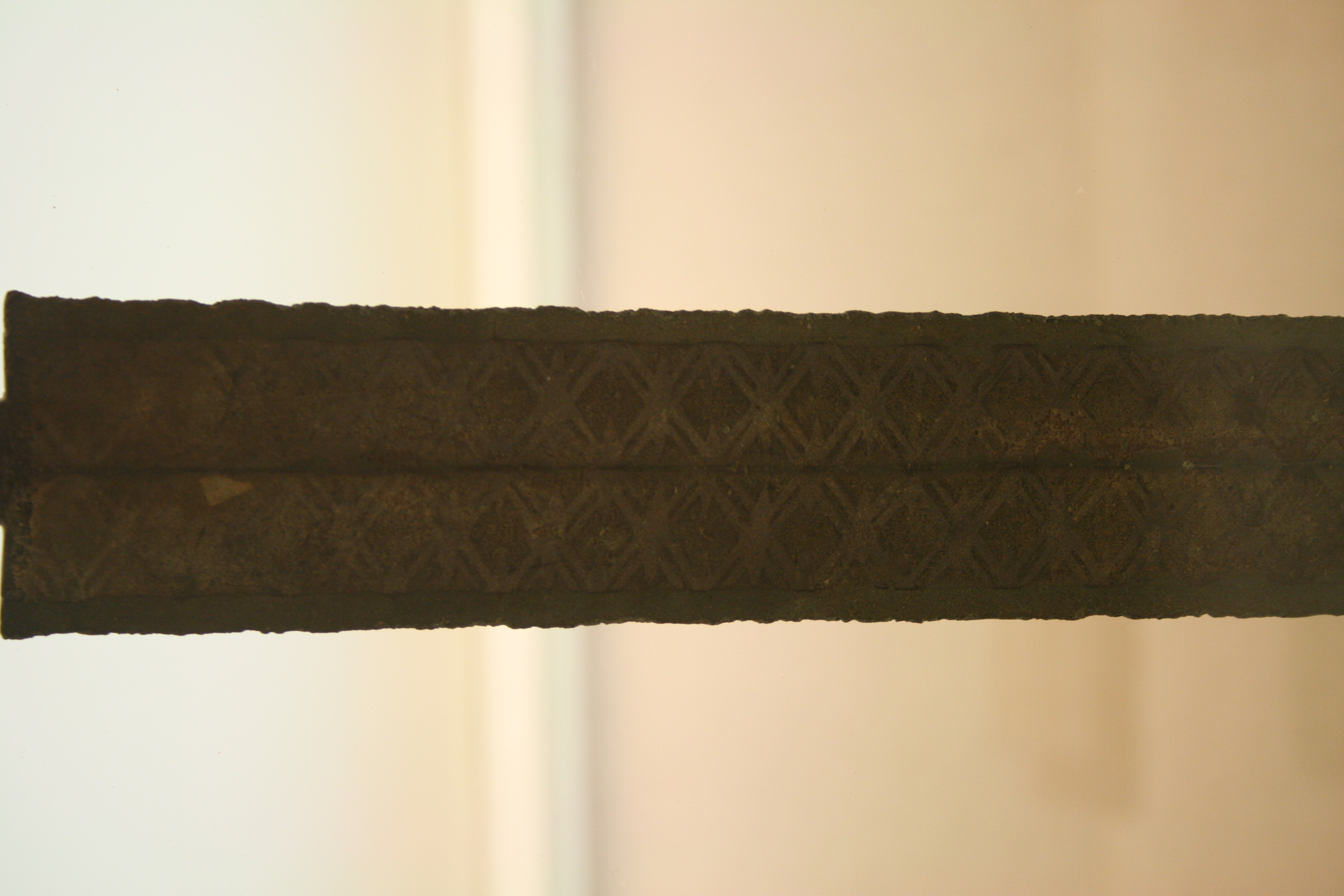
Close up of sword pattern

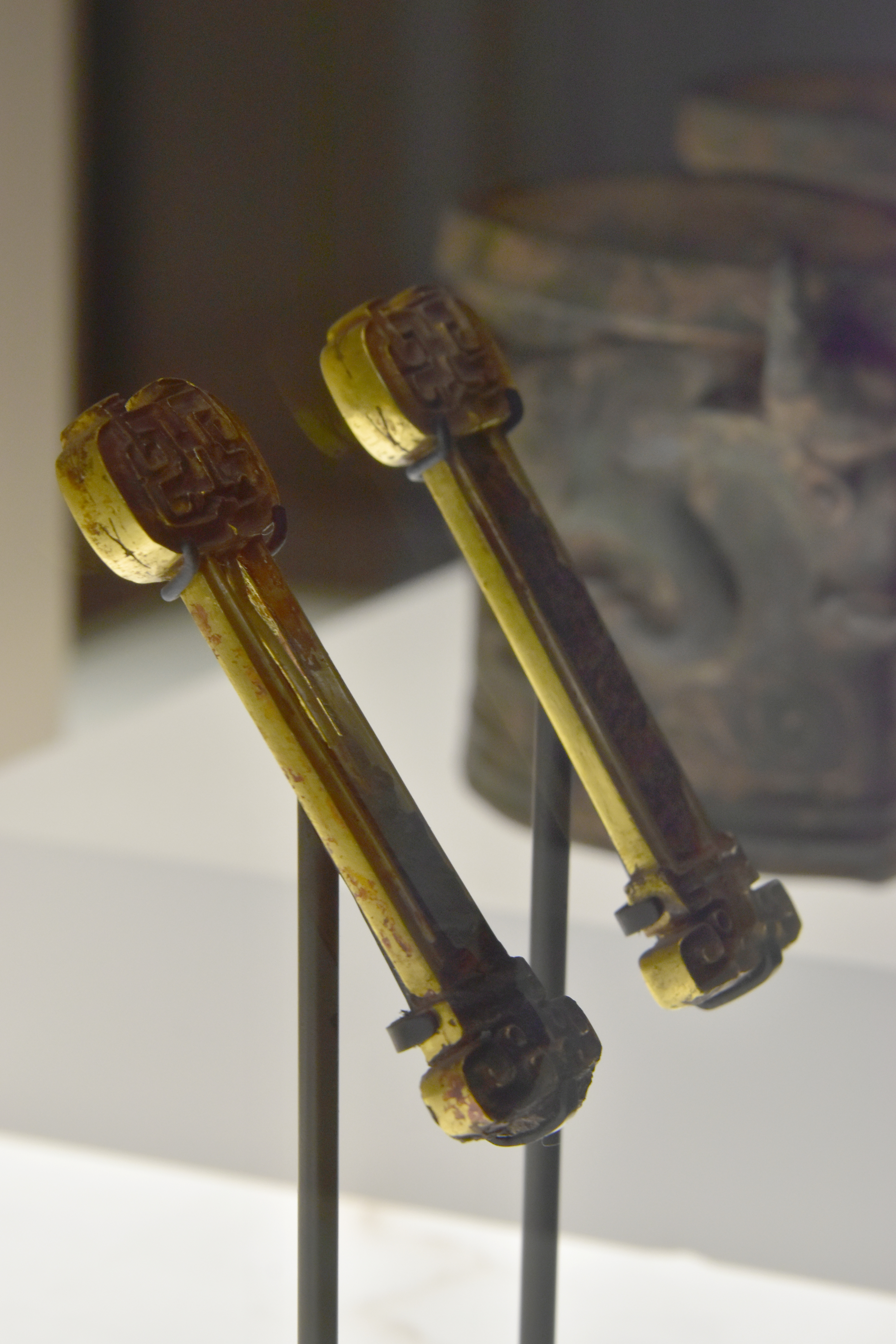
Ornate sword hilts from the Spring and Autumn period

Knives were found in Fu Hao's tomb, dated c. 1200 BC.

Bronze jians appeared during the Western Zhou. The blades were a mere 28 to 46 cm (11 to 18 in) long. These short stabbing weapons were used as a last defense when all other options had failed.

By the late Spring and Autumn period, jians lengthened to about 56 cm (22 in). At this point, at least some soldiers used the jian rather than the dagger-axe due to its greater flexibility and portability. China started producing steel in the 6th century BC. Still, iron and steel tools were not produced in significant quantities until much later. By around 500 BC, however, the sword and shield combination began to be regarded as superior to the spear and dagger-axe.

The early bronze swords are seldom over 50 cm (20 in) in length and are sometimes referred to as "short swords". A rather sudden development, perhaps in the mid-third century BC, is the bronze "long sword", typically about a metre long. An example from the First Emperor's mausoleum... Most iron swords are also long, and the development of the long bronze sword is often considered to be related to the development of the long iron sword.

— Donald Wagner

=== Legendary swords ===
According to the Yuejue shu (Record of Precious Swords), the swordsmith Ou Yezi forged five treasured swords for Gan Jiang and King Zhao of Chu, named, respectively, Zhanlu (湛盧), Juque (巨闕), Shengxie (勝邪), Yuchang (魚腸) and Chunjun (純鈞). He also made three swords for King Goujian of Yue, named Longyuan (龍淵), Tai’e (泰阿) and Gongbu (工布).

- Chungou/Chunjun (Purity) – Its patterns resembled a row of stars in a constellation.
- Zhanlu/Pilü (Black) – A sword made from the finest of the five metals and imbued with the essence of fire. It was said to be sensitive to its owner's behaviour and left of its own accord for the state of Chu when Helü's conduct offended it. When Helü became aware of King Zhao of Chu's possession of Zhanlu, he attacked Chu.
- Haocao/Panying (Bravery/Hard) – Said to have been imbued with the aspect of lawlessness and was, therefore, of no use to anyone. It was used as a burial object.
- Yuchang (Fish Belly) – A short dagger said to be capable of cleaving through iron as if it were mud. Used by Helü of Wu to assassinate his uncle, Liao of Wu. It was hidden in a cooked fish presented to King Liao at a banquet. As a result, it gained a reputation for causing its user to be disloyal.
- Juque (Great Destroyer) – Said to be incredibly durable and withstand even hitting or stabbing rock.
- Shengxie (Victor over Evil)
- Longyuan (Dragon Gulf) – Its shape resembled a high mountain and a deep gulf. Goujian used it to cut a gash in his thigh as self-punishment when he mistakenly executed an innocent person.
- Taie (Great Riverbank) – Had patterns like the waves of a flowing river. The King of Chu used it to direct his army against a Jin invasion.
- Gongbu (Artisanal Display) – Had patterns like flowing water that stop like pearls at the spine.

Among the names of ancient swords are Zhanlu and Yuchang. The character is pronounced zhan; [the name Zhanlu] refers to its clear – zhan zhan ran – black colour. [Lu means 'black'.]
The ancients used ji steel [see below] to make the edge and wrought iron to make the haft [jing] and 'trunk' [gan, i.e. the spine]. Otherwise, they would often snap. In swords made of steel, the edge is often damaged, which is the origin of the name Juque ['Great Notch']. Thus one cannot use ji steel by itself.
Yuchang ['Fish Gut'] was what today is called a pan gang ['coiled steel'] or song wen ['fish patterned'] sword. If one takes a fish, bakes it, and strips off the ribs to reveal the guts, it resembles the pattern on a modern pan gang sword.

— Shen Kuo

=== Gan Jiang and Mo Ye ===
According to the Spring and Autumn Annals of Wu and Yue, Ou Yezi was also the teacher of Gan Jiang, who was married to Mo Ye. King Helü of Wu ordered Gan Jiang and Mo Ye to forge a pair of swords for him in three months. However, the blast furnace failed to melt the metal. Mo Ye suggested that there was insufficient human qi in the stove, so the couple cut their hair and nails and cast them into the furnace, while 300 children helped to blow air into the bellows. In another account, Mo Ye sacrificed herself to increase human qi by throwing herself into the furnace. The desired result was achieved after three years, and the two swords were named after the couple. Gan Jiang kept the male sword, Ganjiang, for himself and presented the pair's female sword, Moye, to the King. The King, already upset that Gan Jiang had failed to supply the blades in three months but three years, became enraged when he discovered the smith had kept the male sword and thus had Gan Jiang killed.

Gan Jiang had already predicted the King's reaction, so he left behind a message for Mo Ye and their unborn son, telling them where he had hidden the Ganjiang Sword. Several months later, Mo Ye gave birth to Gan Jiang's son, Chi (赤), and years later, she told him his father's story. Chi was eager to avenge his father, and he sought the Ganjiang Sword. At the same time, the King dreamed of a youth who desired to kill him and placed a bounty on the youth's head. Chi was indignant and filled with anguish. He started crying on his way to enact his vengeance. An assassin found Chi, who told the killer his story. The assassin then suggested that Chi surrender his head and sword, and the assassin himself will avenge Ganjiang in Chi's place. He did as told and committed suicide. The killer was moved and decided to help Chi fulfil his quest.

The assassin severed Chi's head and brought it, along with the Ganjiang sword, to the overjoyed King. The king was, however, uncomfortable with Chi's head staring at him. The assassin asked the King to have Chi's head boiled, but Chi's head was still staring at the King even after 40 days without any sign of decomposition; thus, the assassin told the king that he needed to take a closer look and stare back for the head to decompose under the power of the King. The King bent over the cauldron, and the assassin seized the opportunity to decapitate him, his head falling into the pot alongside Chi's. The killer then cut off his own head, which also fell into the boiling water. The flesh on the heads was boiled away such that none of the guards could recognize which head belonged to whom. The guards and vassals decided that all three should be honoured as kings due to Chi and the assassin's bravery and loyalty. The three heads were eventually buried together at Yichun County, Runan, Henan, and the grave is called "Tomb of Three Kings".

== Warring States period (475–221 BC) ==
Iron and steel swords of 80 to 100 cm (31 to 39 in) in length appeared during the mid Warring States period in the states of Chu, Han, and Yan. Most weapons were still made of bronze, but iron and steel were starting to become more common. By the end of the 3rd century BC, the Chinese had learned how to produce quench-hardened steel swords, relegating bronze swords to ceremonial pieces.

The Zhan Guo Ce states that the state of Han made the best weapons, capable of cleaving through the strongest armour, shields, leather boots and helmets.

=== Wu and Yue swords ===
During the Warring States period, the Baiyue people were known for their swordsmanship and for producing fine swords. According to the Spring and Autumn Annals of Wu and Yue, King Goujian met a female sword fighter called Nanlin (Yuenü) who demonstrated mastery over the art. So he commanded his top five commanders to study her technique. Ever since the method came to be known as the "Sword of the Lady of Yue". The Yue were also thought to have possessed mystical knives imbued with the talismanic power of dragons or other amphibious creatures.

The woman was going to travel north to have an audience with King [Goujian of Yue] when she met an older man on the road, and he introduced himself as Lord Yuan. He asked the woman: “I have heard that you are good at swordsmanship, I would like to see this.” The woman said: “I do not dare to conceal anything from you; my lord, you may put me to the test.” Lord Yuan then selected a stave of linyu bamboo, the top of which was withered. He broke off [the leaves] at the top and threw them to the ground, and the woman picked them up [before they hit the ground]. Lord Yuan then grabbed the bottom end of the bamboo and stabbed the woman. She responded, and they fought three bouts, and just as the woman lifted the stave to strike him, Lord Yuan flew into the treetops and became a white gibbon (yuan).

— Spring and Autumn Annals of Wu and Yue

The Zhan Guo Ce mentions the high quality of southern swords and their ability to cleave through oxen, horses, bowls, and basins. However, they would shatter if used on a pillar or rock. Wu and Yue's swords were highly valued, and those who owned them would hardly ever use them for fear of damage. However, these swords were commonplace in Wu and Yue and treated with less reverence. The Yuejue shu (Record of Precious Swords) mentions several named swords: Zhanlu (Black), Haocao (Bravery), Juque (Great Destroyer), Lutan (Dew Platform), Chunjun (Purity), Shengxie (Victor over Evil), Yuchang (Fish-belly), Longyuan (Dragon Gulf), Taie (Great Riverbank), and Gongbu (Artisanal Display). Many of these were made by the Yue swordsmith Ou Yezi.

Swords held a special place in the culture of the ancient kingdoms of Wu and Yue. Legends about swords were recorded here far earlier and in much greater detail than in any other part of China. This reflects both the development of sophisticated sword-making technology in this region of China and the importance of these blades within the culture of the ancient south. Both Wu and Yue were famous among their contemporaries for the quantity and quality of the blades they produced. However, it was not until much later, during the Han dynasty, that legends about them were first collected. These tales became an important part of Chinese mythology. They introduced the characters of legendary swordsmiths such as Gan Jiang 干將 and Mo Ye 莫耶 to new audiences in stories that would be popular for millennia. These tales would keep the fame of Wu and Yue sword-craft alive, many centuries after these kingdoms had vanished, and indeed into a time when swords had been rendered completely obsolete for other than ceremonial purposes by developments in military technology.

— Olivia Milburn

Even after Wu and Yue were assimilated into larger Chinese polities, the memory of their swords lived on. During the Han dynasty, Liu Pi King of Wu (195–154 BC) had a sword named Wujian to honour the history of metalworking in his kingdom.

== Qin dynasty (221–206 BC) ==
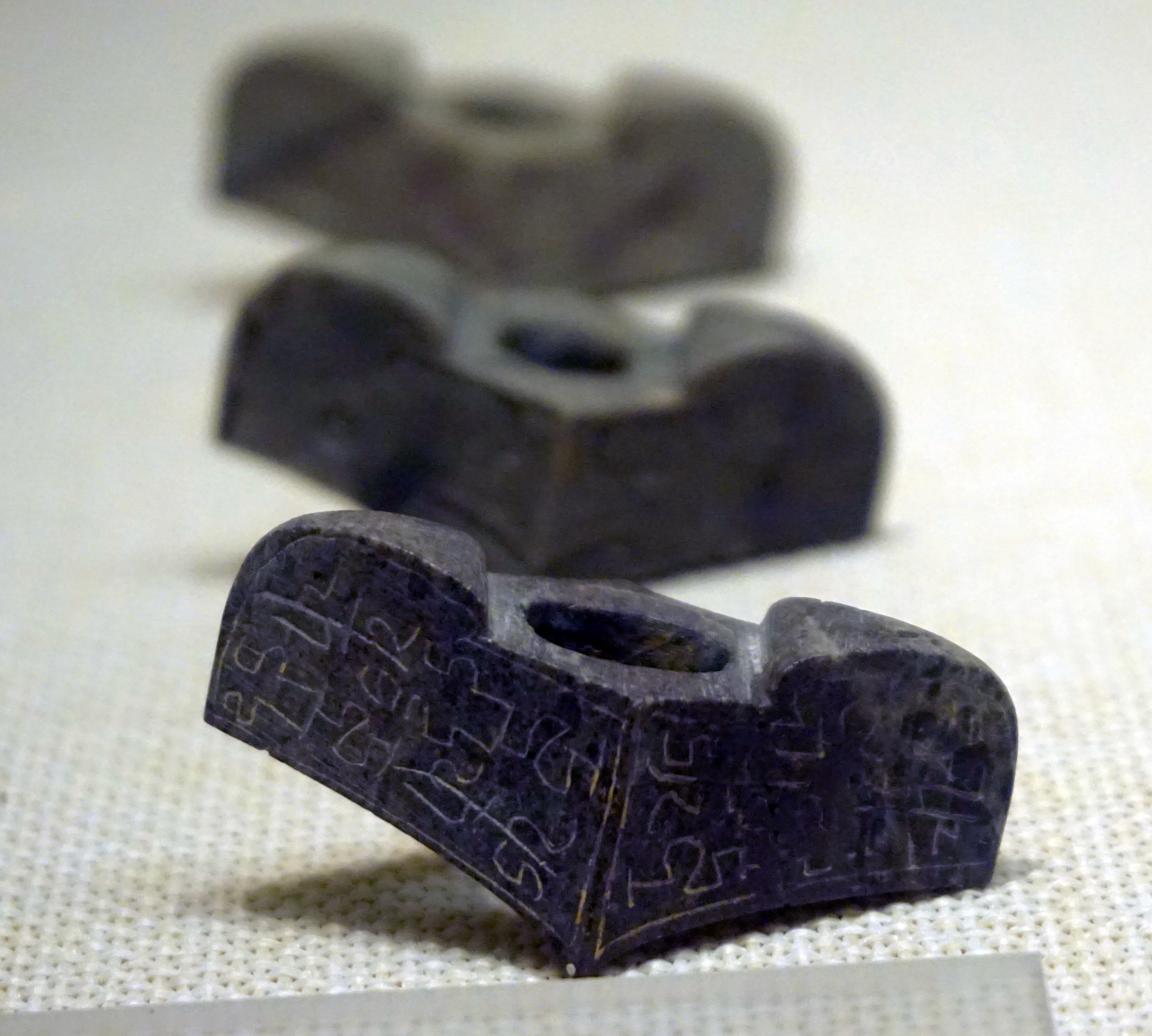
Warring States sword guards

Sword dances are first mentioned shortly after the end of the Qin dynasty. Swords up to 110 cm (43 in) in length began to appear.

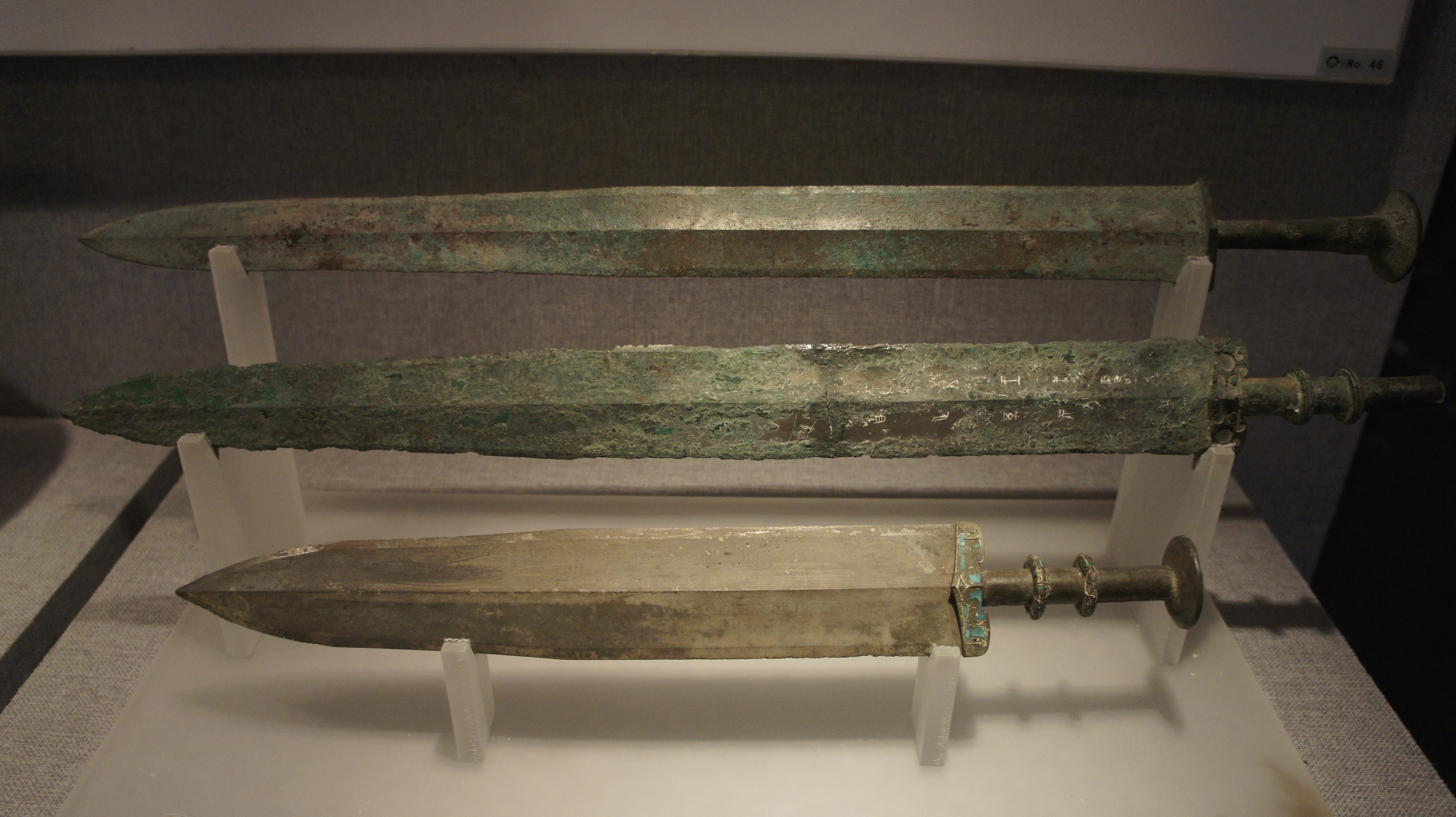
Warring States bronze jians

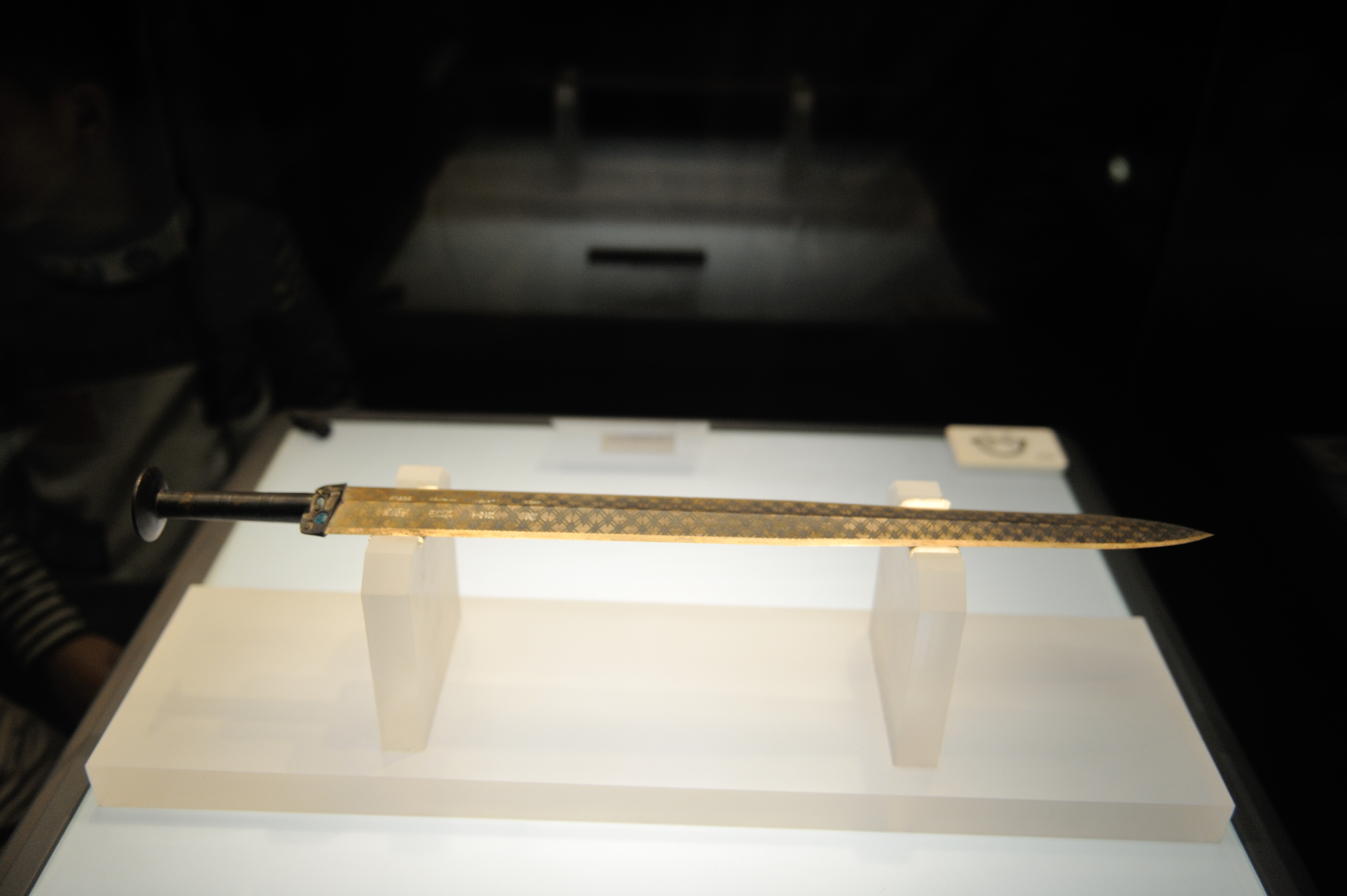
Sword of Goujian

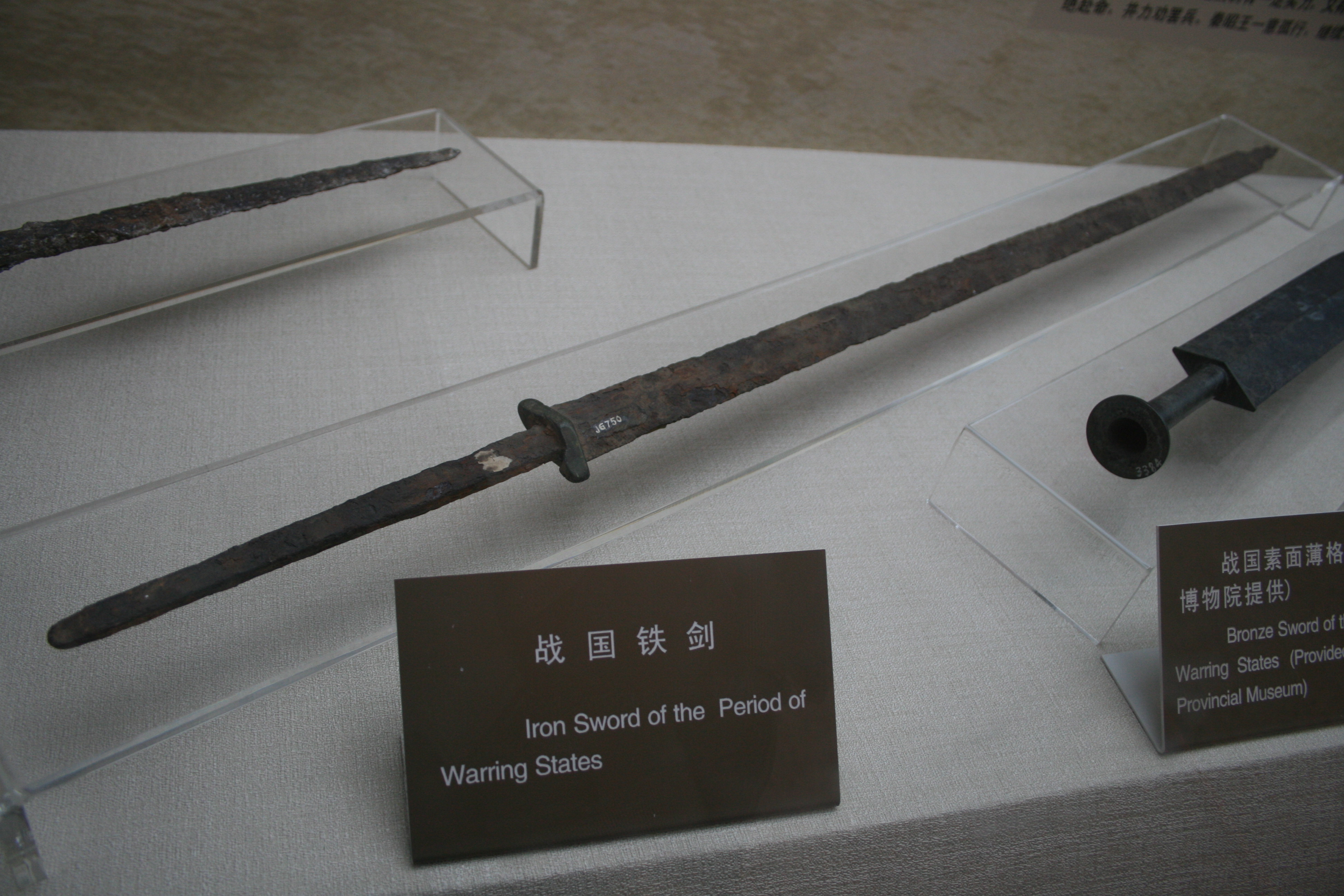
Warring States iron jian

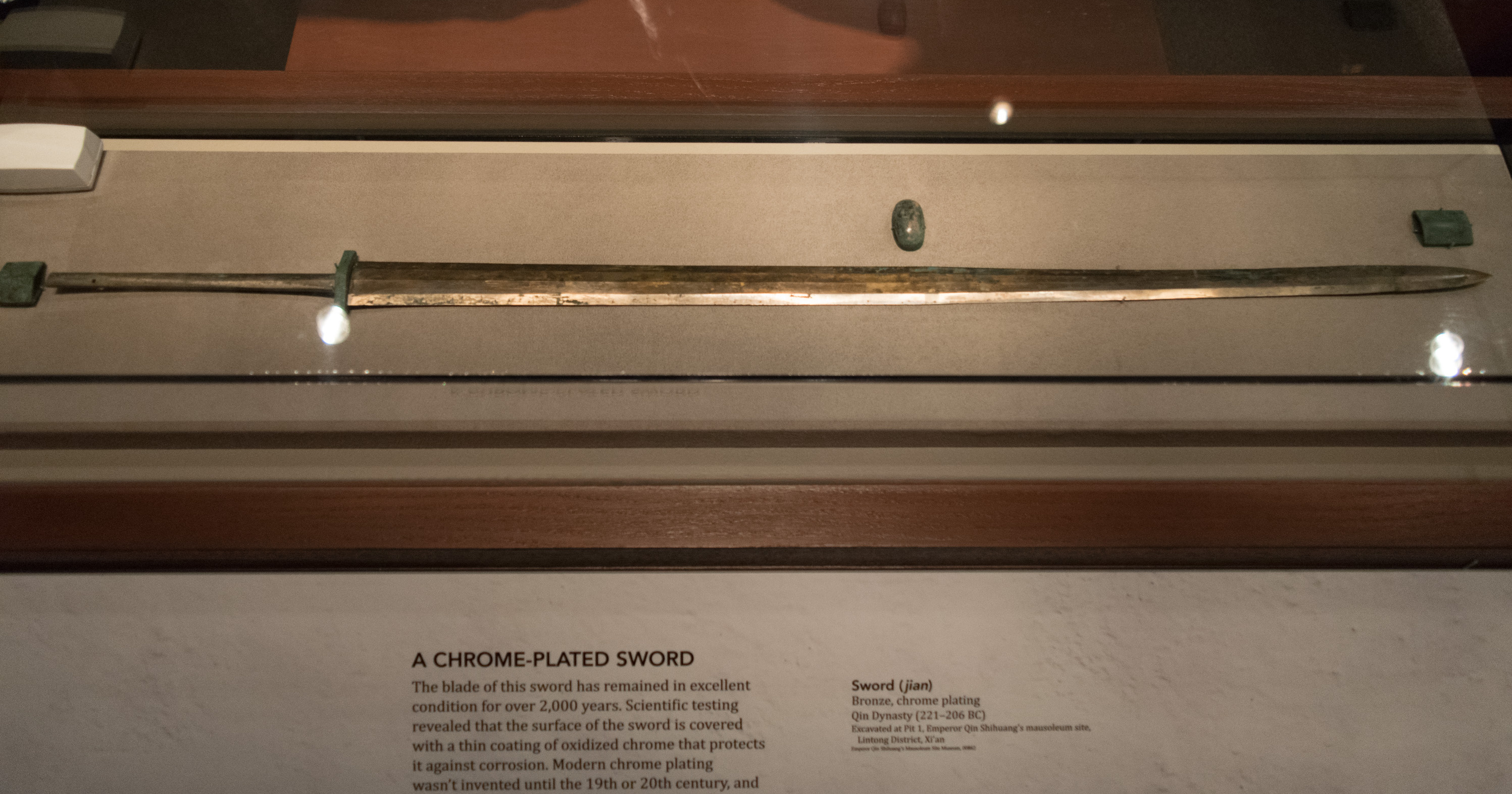
Qin dynasty jian

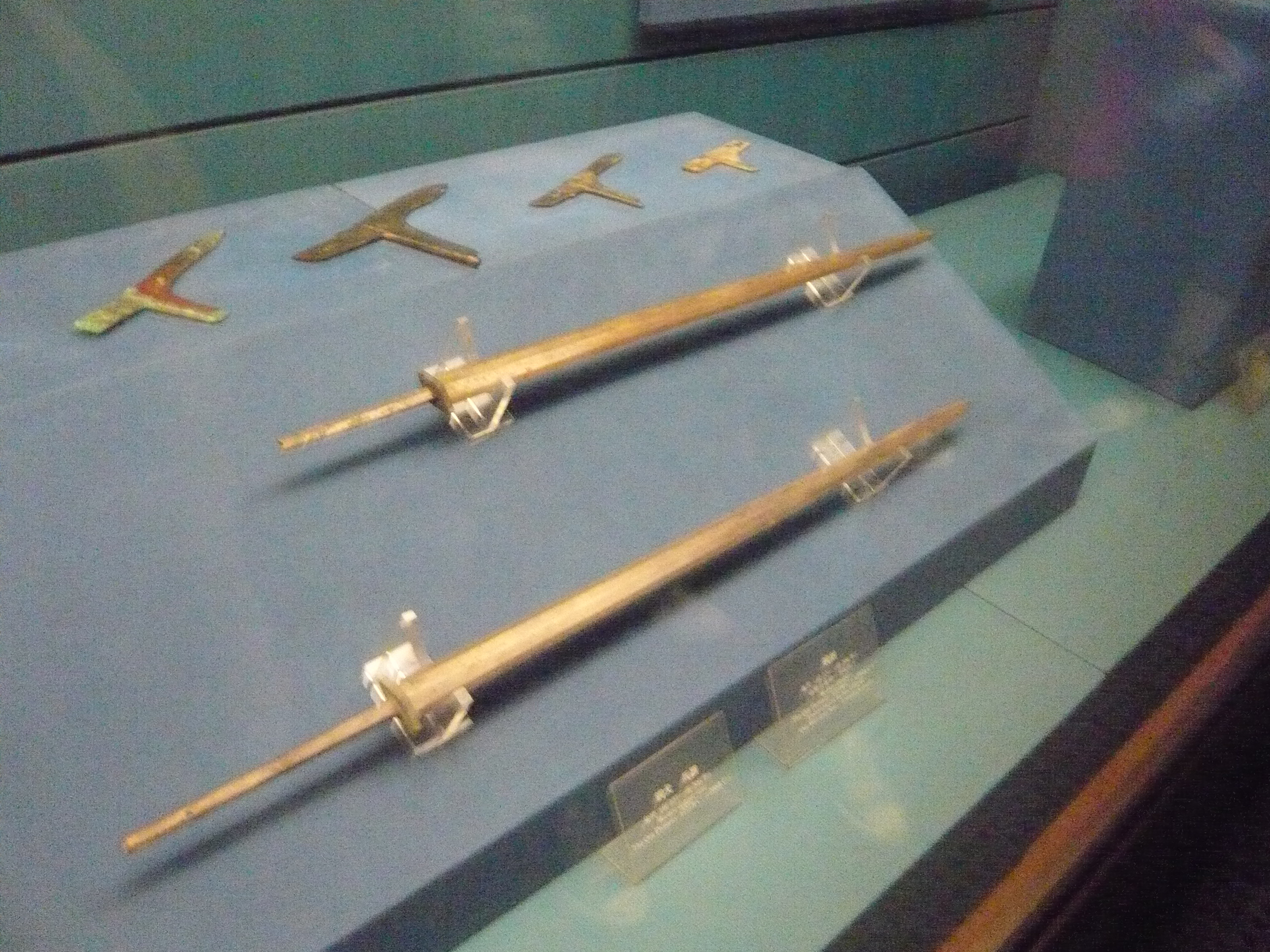
Qin bronze jians

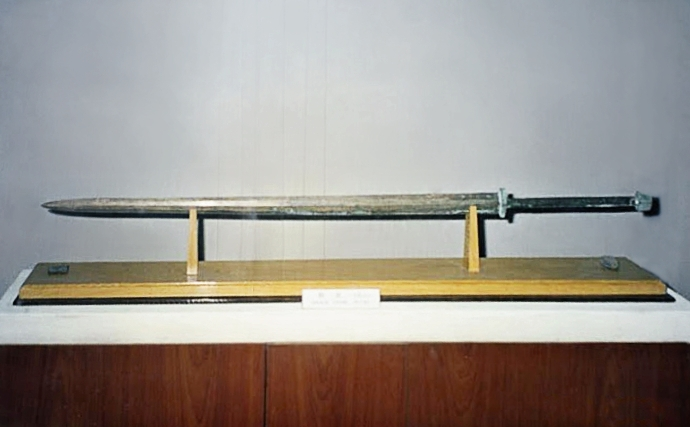
Qin jian

== Han dynasty (206 BC–220 AD) ==
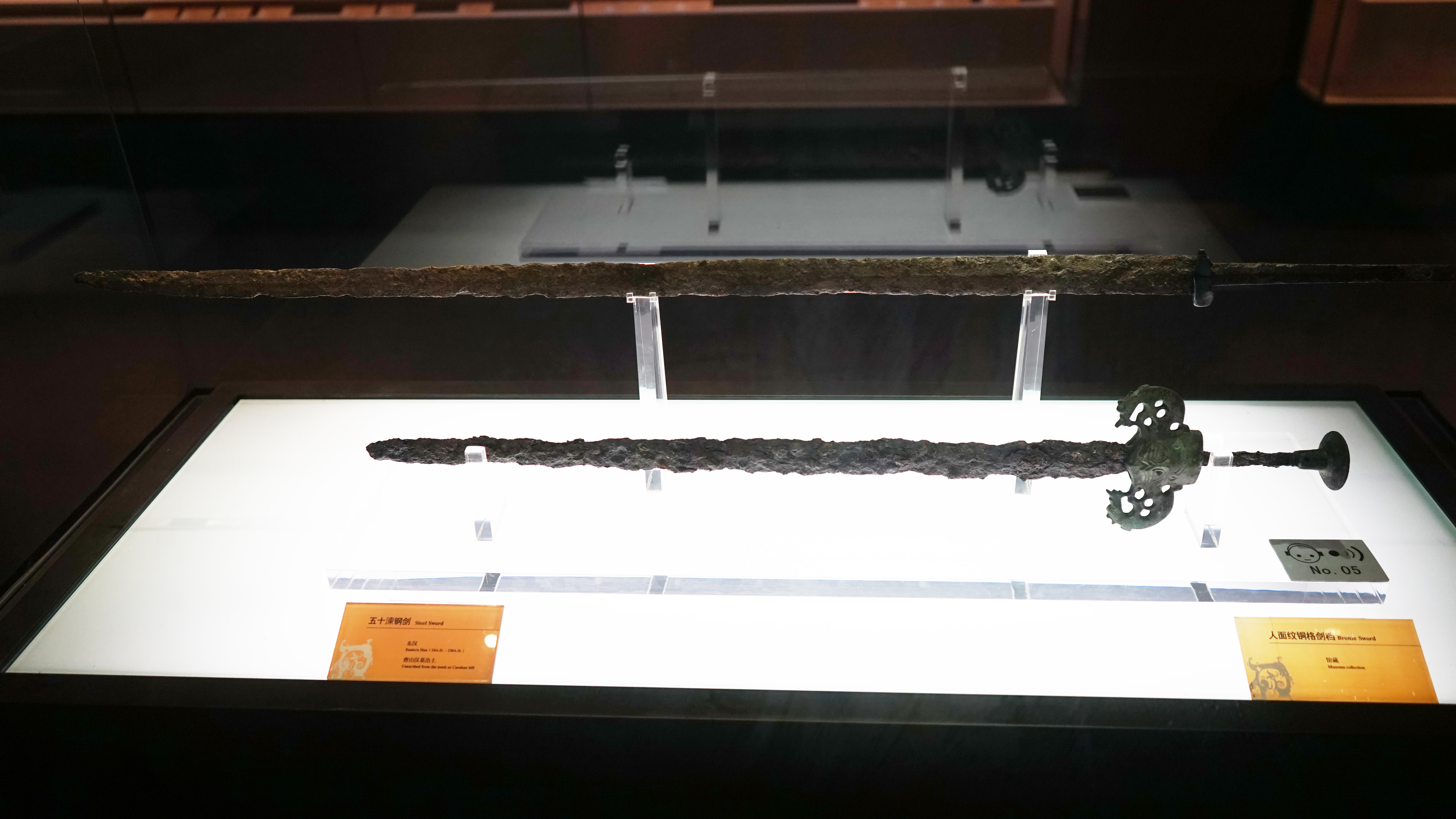
Han dynasty steel and bronze swords

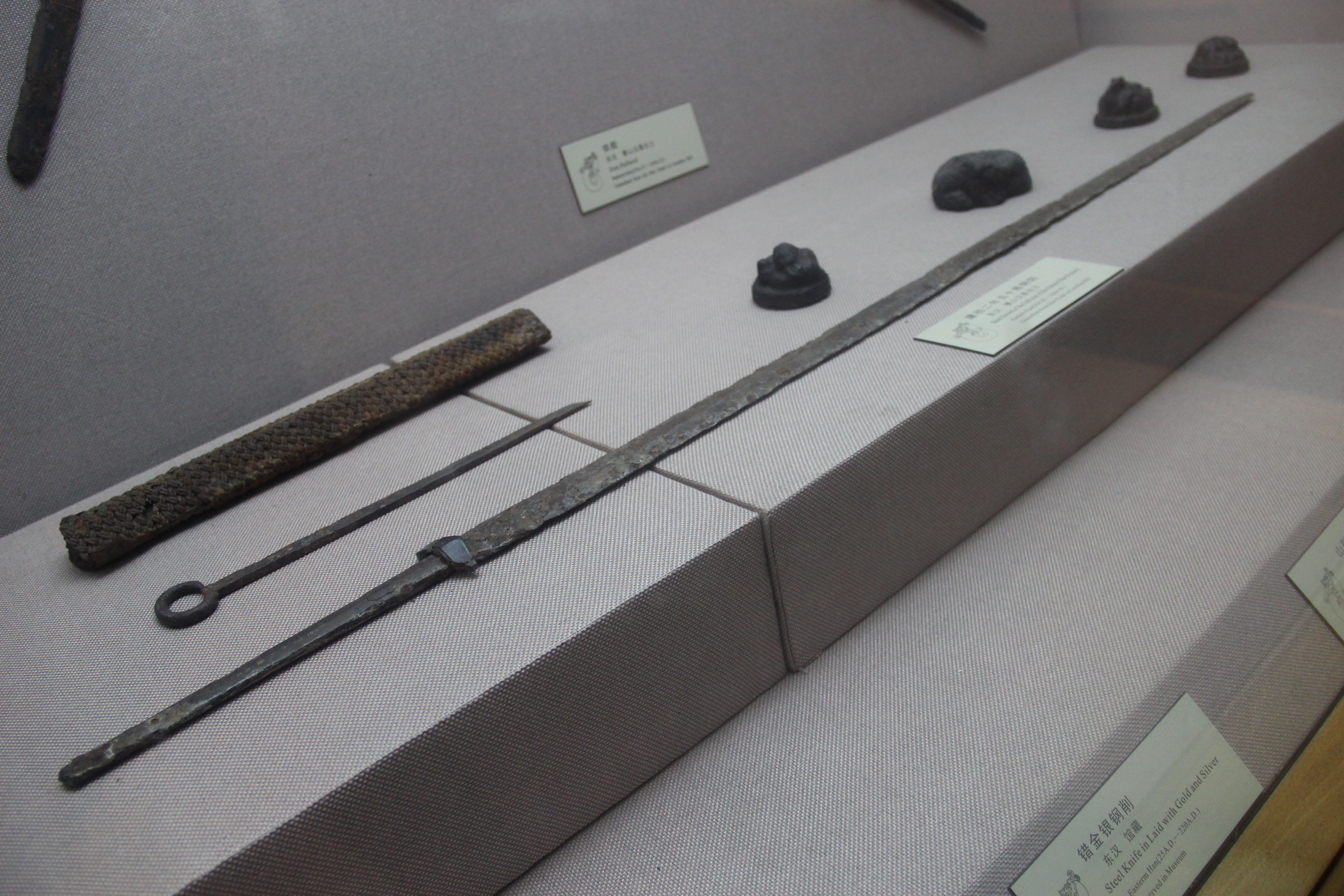
Han jian and scabbard

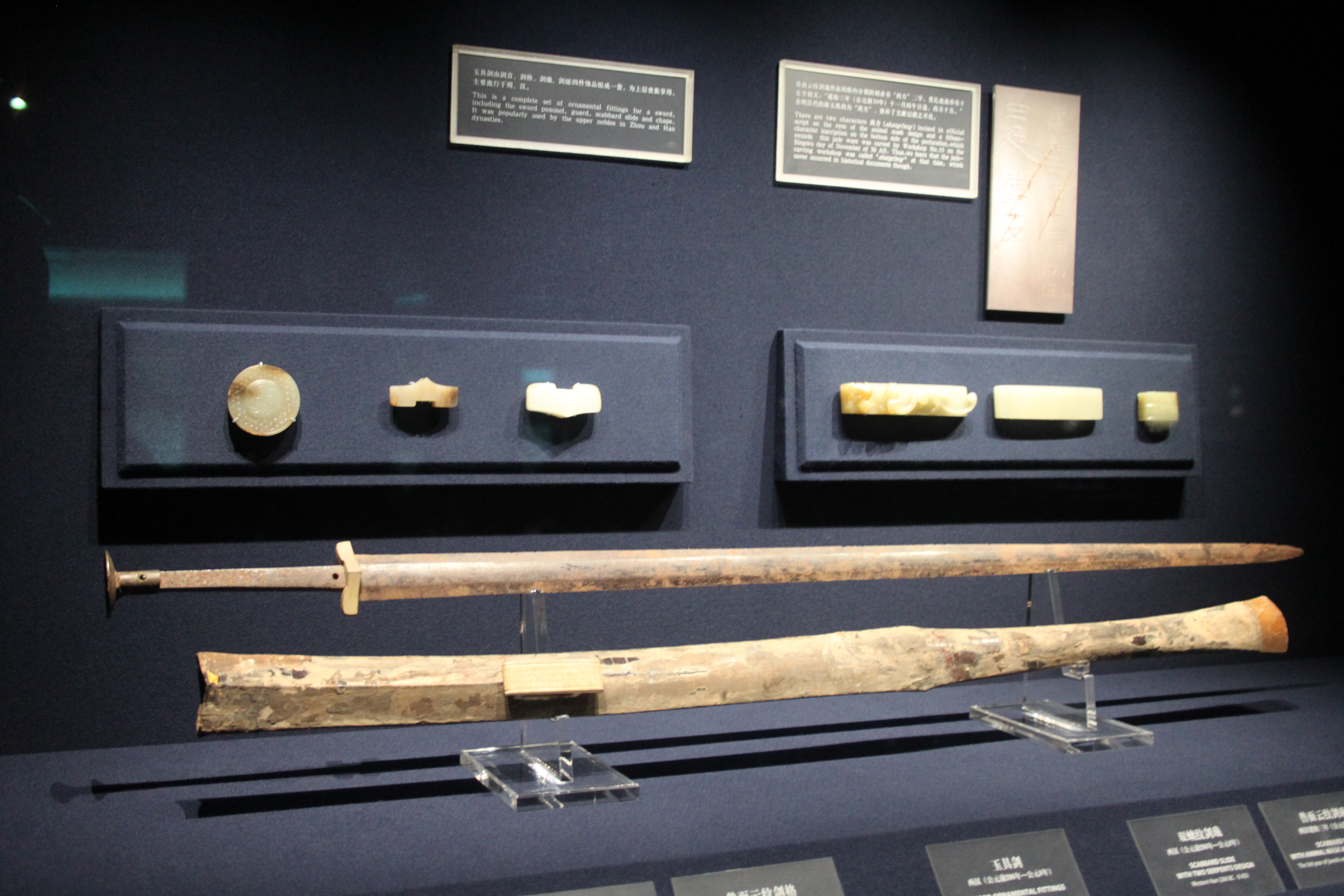
Han jian and scabbard

The jian was mentioned as one of the "Five Weapons" during the Han dynasty, the other four being dao, spear, halberd, and staff. Another version of the Five Weapons lists the bow and crossbow as one weapon, the jian and dao as one weapon, in addition to halberd, shield, and armour.

The jian was a popular personal weapon during the Han era, and a class of swordsmen emerged who made their living through fencing. Sword fencing was also a popular pastime for aristocrats. A 37-chapter manual known as the Way of the Jian is known to have existed but is no longer extant. South and central China were said to have produced the best sworders. Han dynasty swords made between the 1st and 2nd centuries AD have been found in Japan; a ring-pommel dao with an inscription "thirty-fold refined" and a jian with the inscription "fifty-fold refined". A jian in Nara Prefecture was also found with an inscription saying it was produced in the Zhongping era (184–189 AD) and "hundredfold refined."

There existed a weapon called the "Horse Beheading Jian" because it was supposedly able to cut off a horse's head. However, another source says it was an execution tool used on special occasions rather than a military weapon.

As far as we are aware today, all the ancient Chinese iron swords were of wrought iron or steel: none were cast. It seems clear enough that a competent smith could make a wrought-iron or steel sword of any reasonable length the customer desired or could pay for. Measurements in the 70–100 cm range seem to be the most common. Bust swords as long as 1.2 m and even 1.4 m are known... The longer length of an iron sword must have given a warrior an immediate advantage over one with a short bronze sword.

— Donald Wagner

The ring-pommel backsword (環首刀) also became widespread as a weapon of cavalry warfare during the Han era. Being single-edged, the backsword had the advantage of a thickened dull side that strengthen the whole sword, making it less prone to breaking. When paired with a shield, it made for a suitable replacement for the jian. Hence it became the more popular choice as time went on. After the Han, sword dances using the dao rather than the jian are mentioned to have occurred. Archaeological samples range from 86 to 114 cm (34 to 45 in) in length.

An account of Duan Jiong's tactical formation in 167 AD specifies that he arranged "…three ranks of halberds (長鏃 changzu), swordsmen (利刃 liren) and spearmen (長矛 changmao), supported by crossbows (強弩 qiangnu), with light cavalry (輕騎 jingji) on each wing."

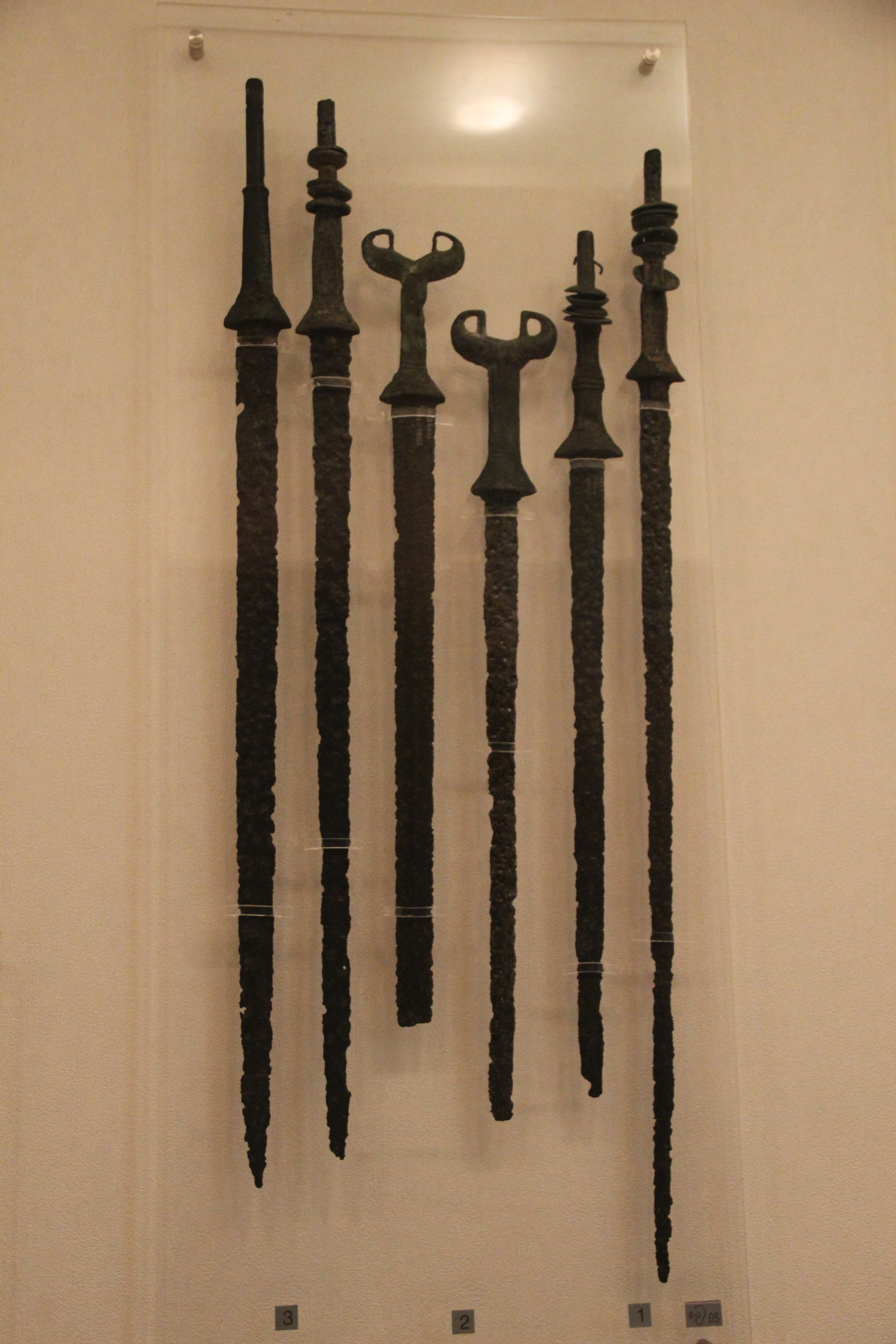
Han jians

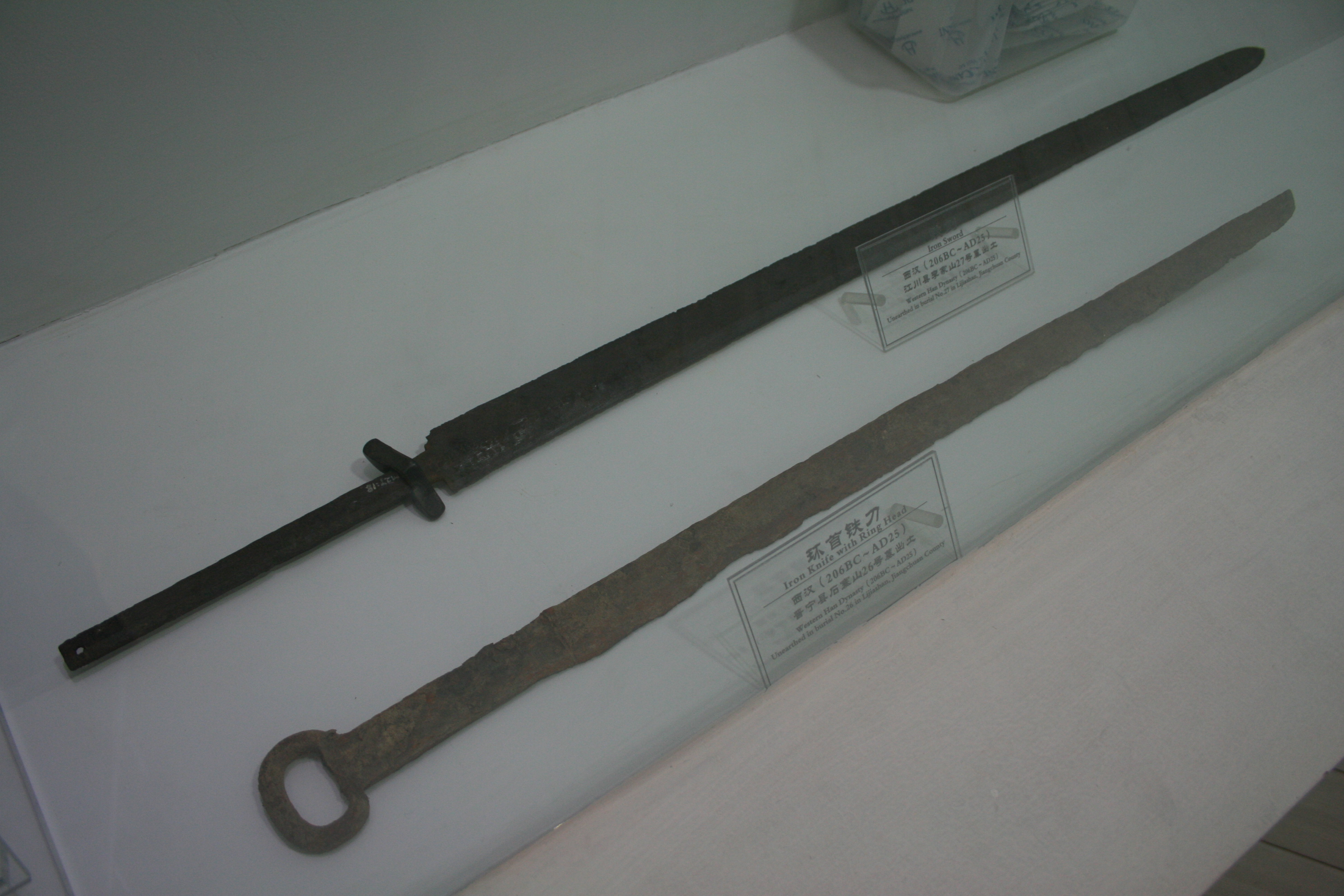
Han jian and dao

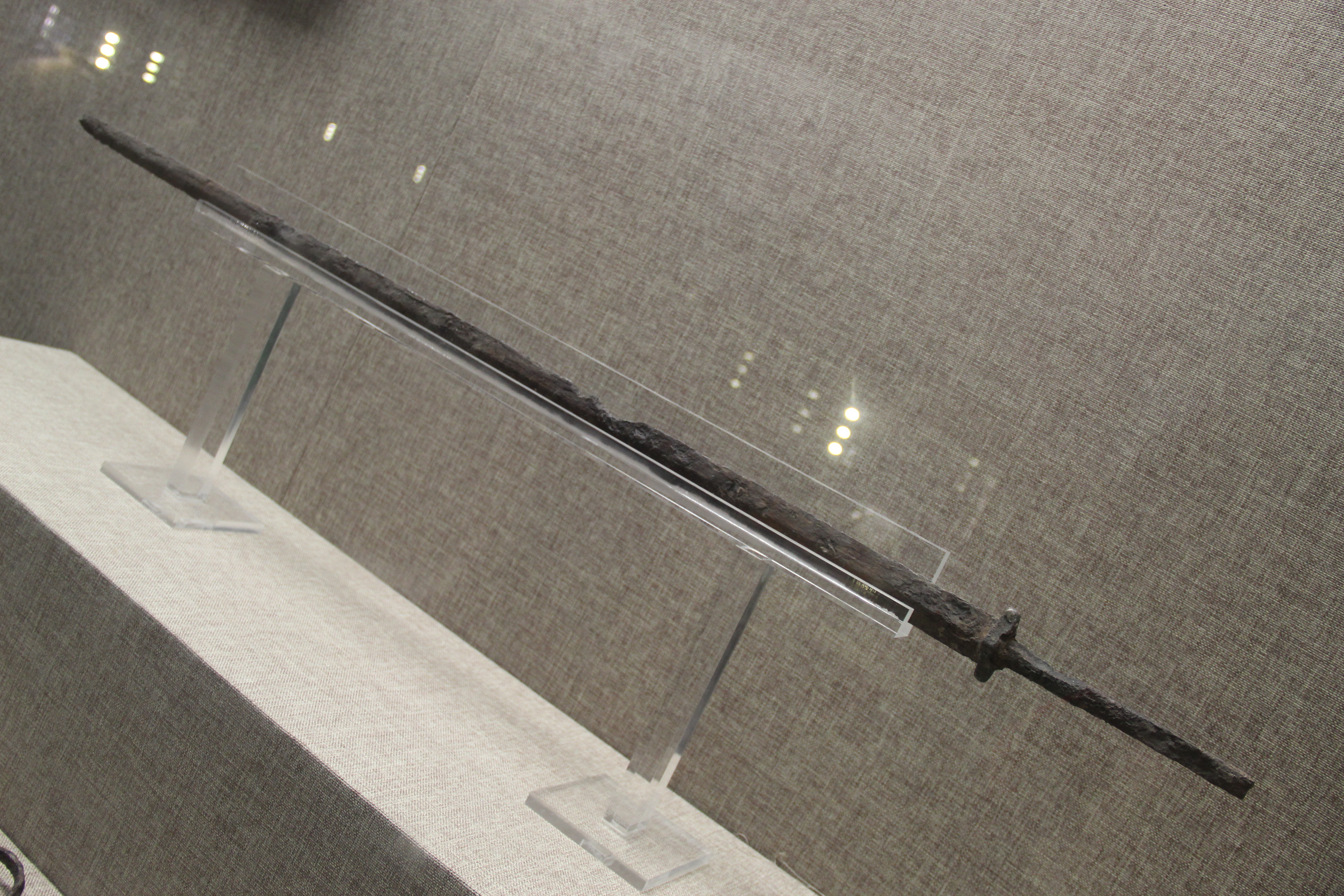
Western Han jian

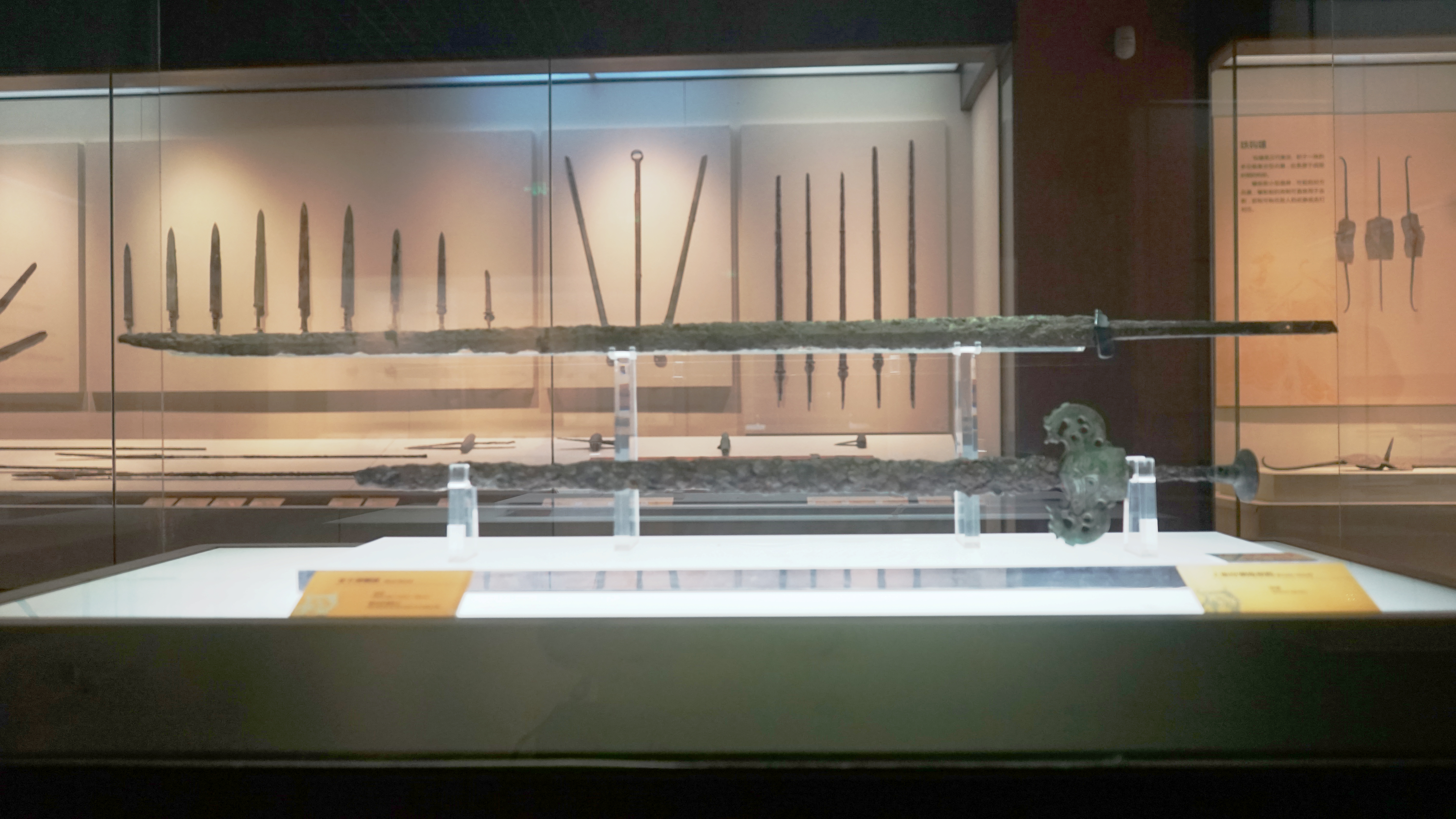
Han jian with elaborate sword guard

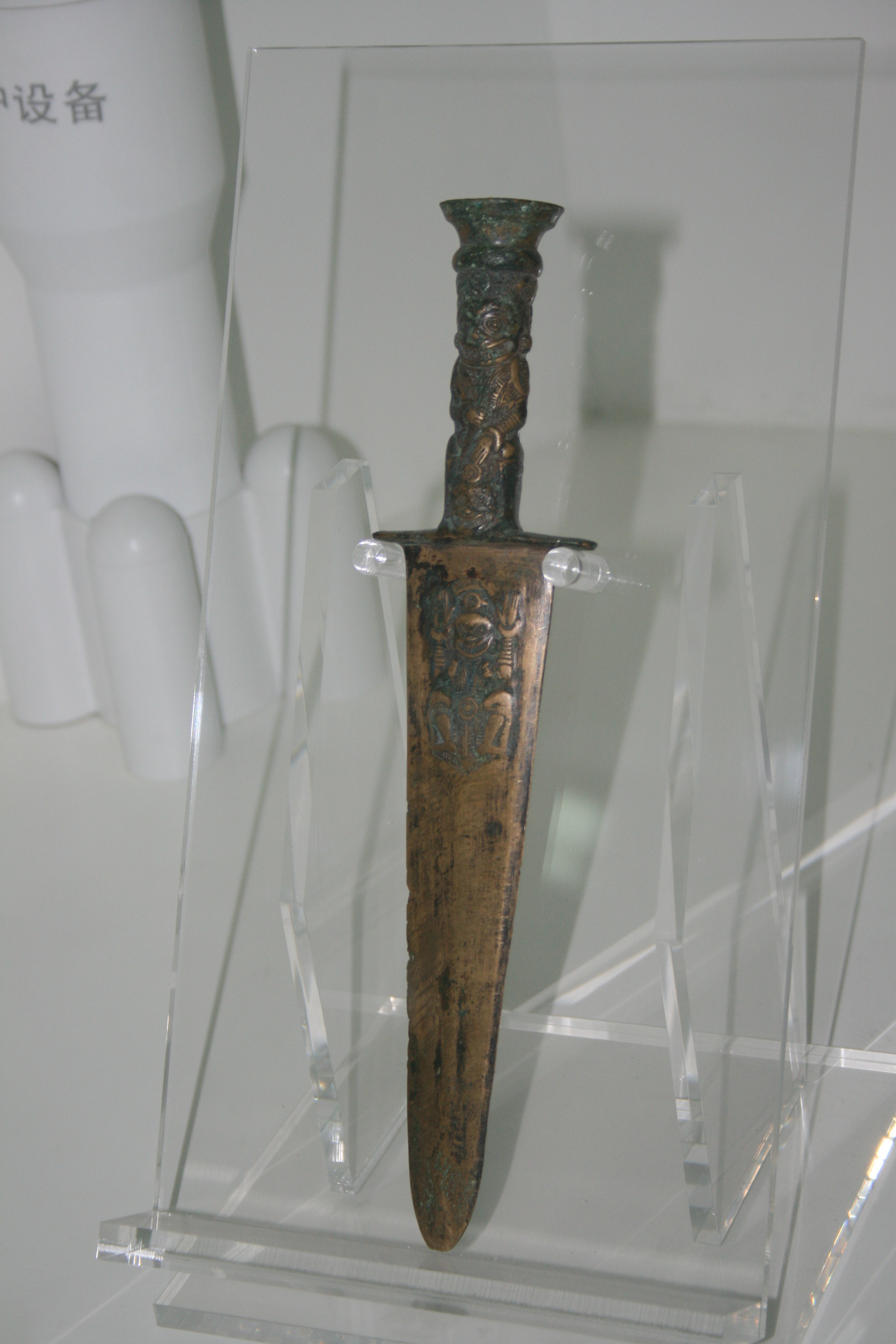
Dian Kingdom bronze dagger

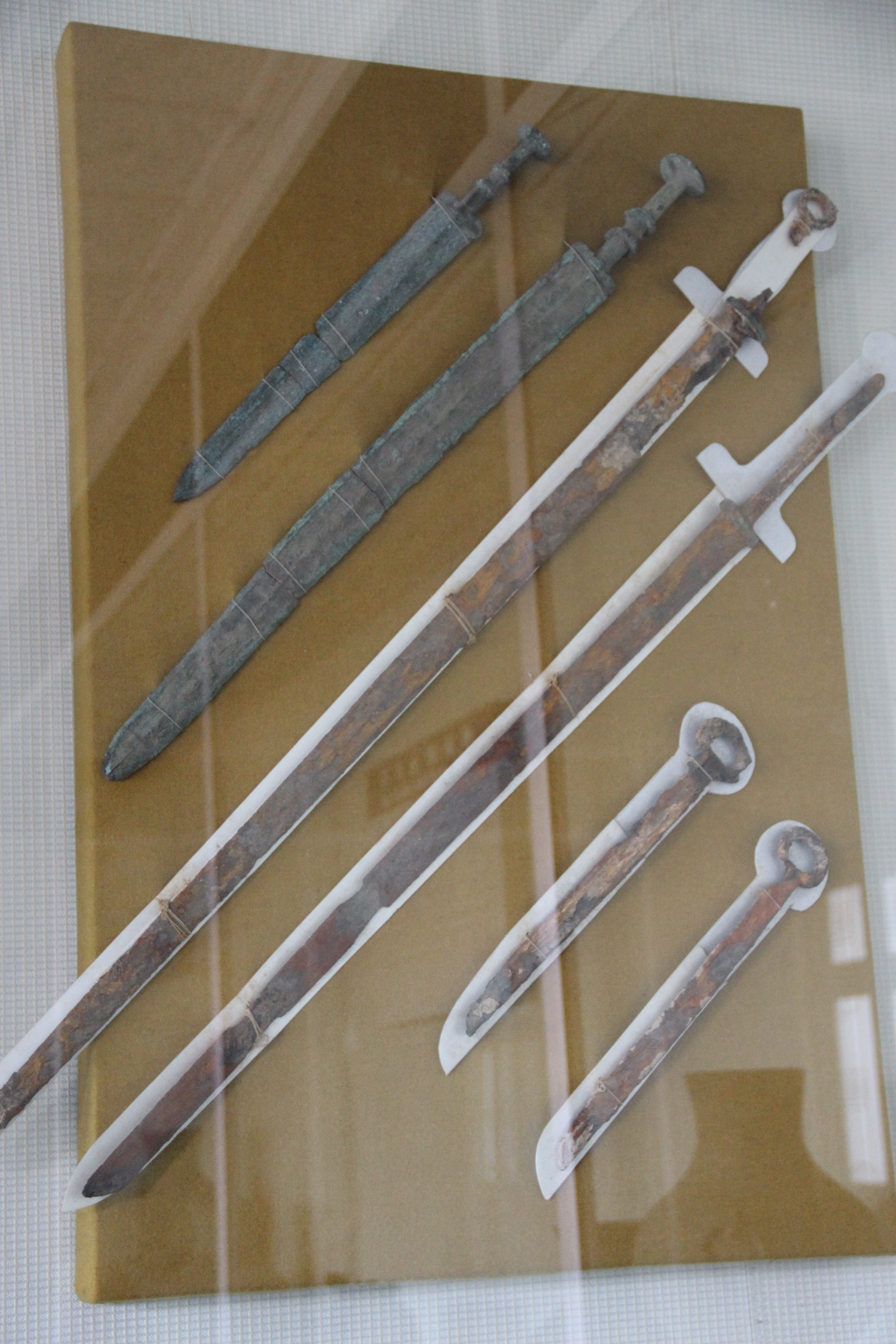
Han knives and jians

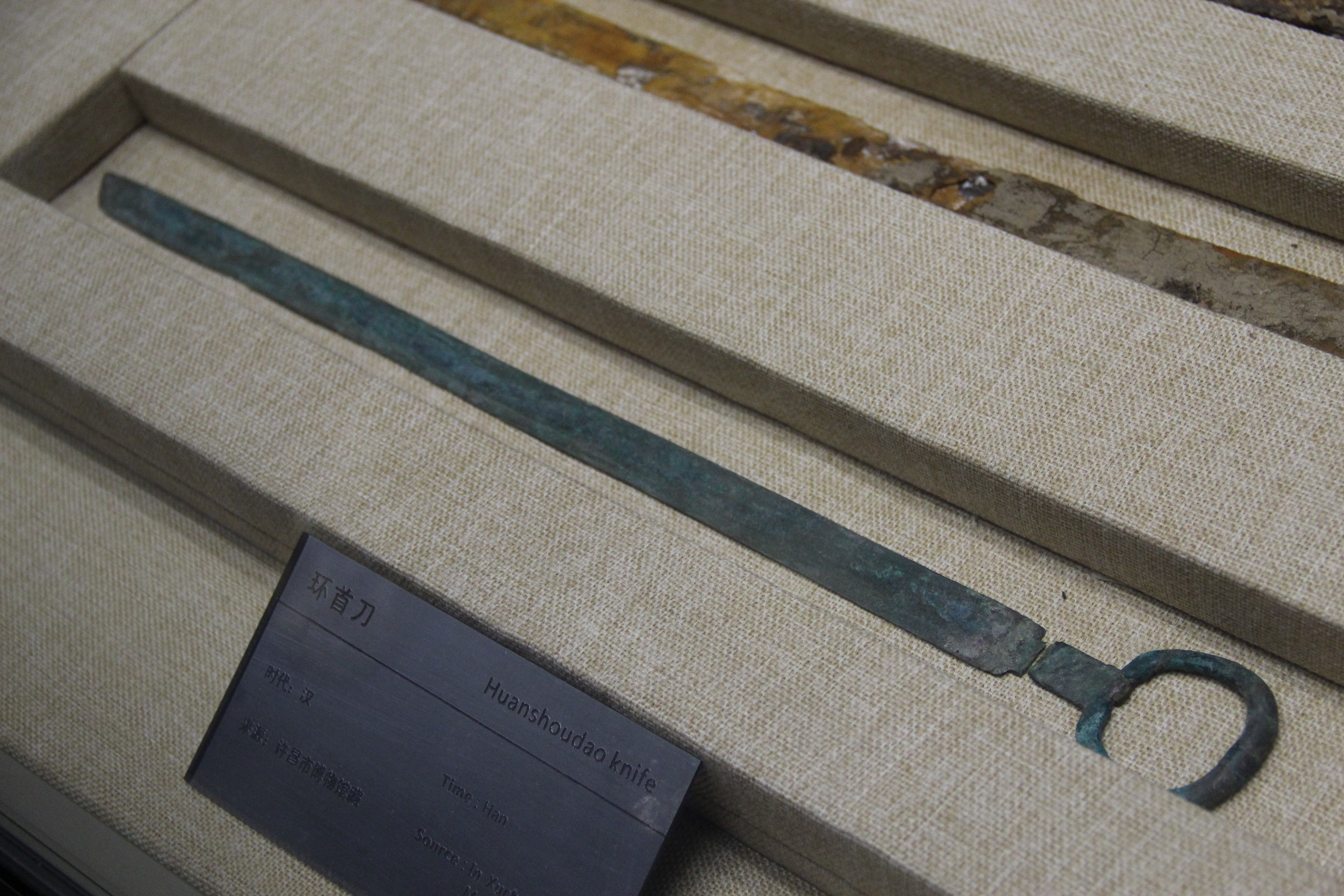
Han ring-pommel backsword (環首刀)

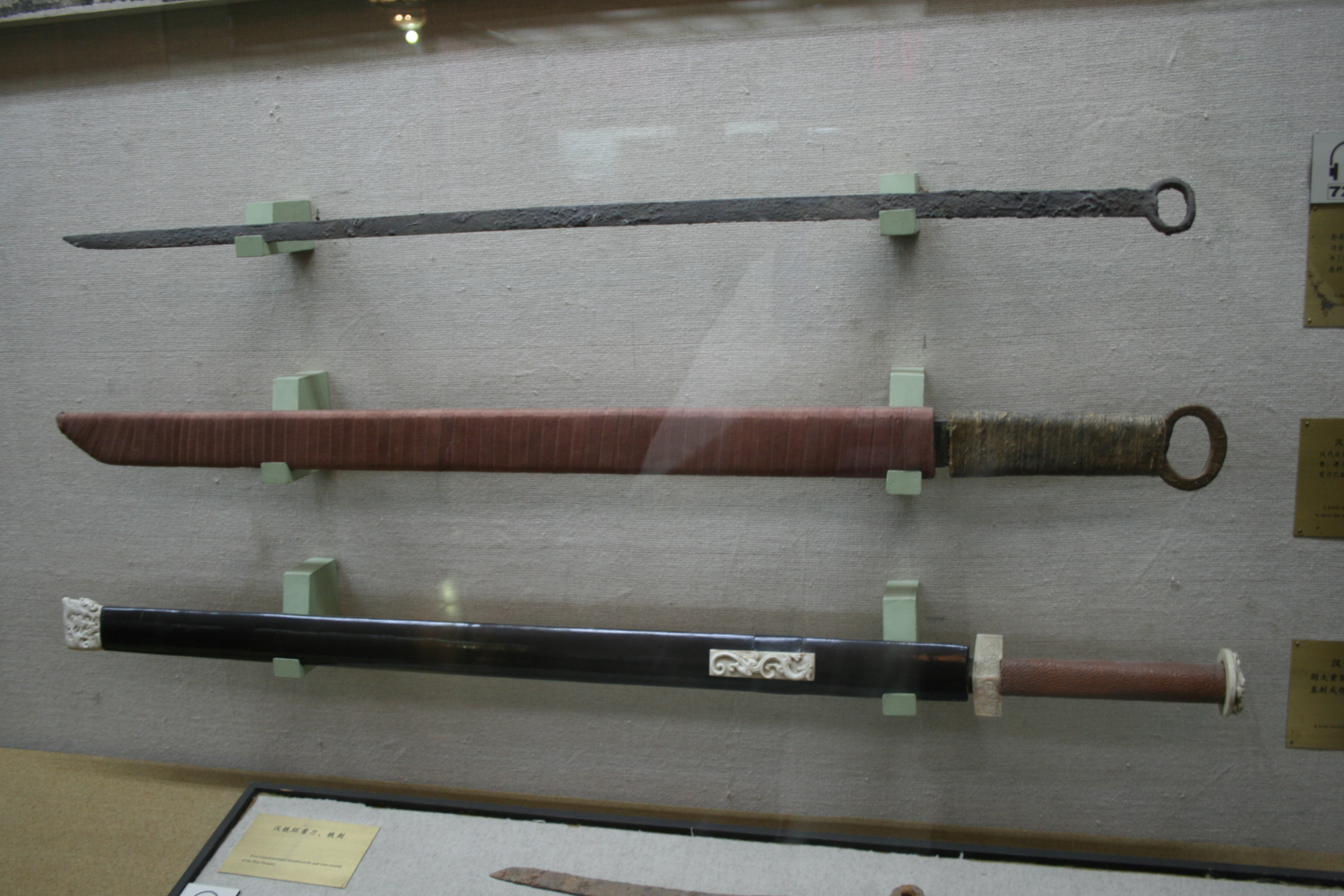
Restored replica of Han ring-pommel backsword (環首刀) and Han jian.

== Three Kingdoms (184/220–280) ==
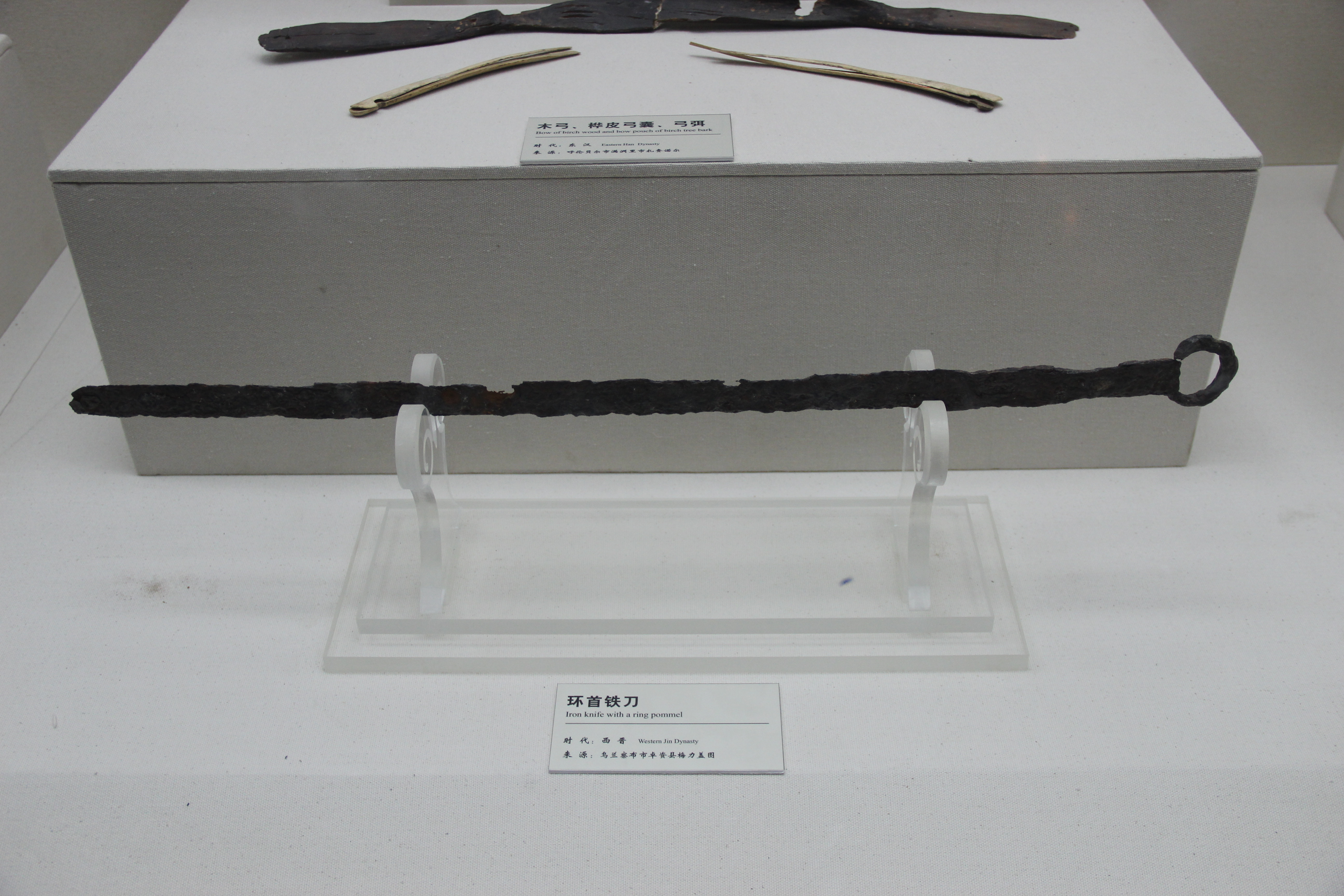
Jin dynasty (266–420) dao

Swords of idiosyncratic sizes are mentioned. One individual named Chen apparently wielded a great sword over two meters in length.

Sun Quan's wife had over a hundred female attendants armed with daos.

By the end of the Three Kingdoms the dao had completely overtaken the jian as the primary close combat weapon. The lighter and less durable double-edged jian entered the domain of court dancers, officials, and expert warriors.

== Northern and Southern dynasties (420–589) ==
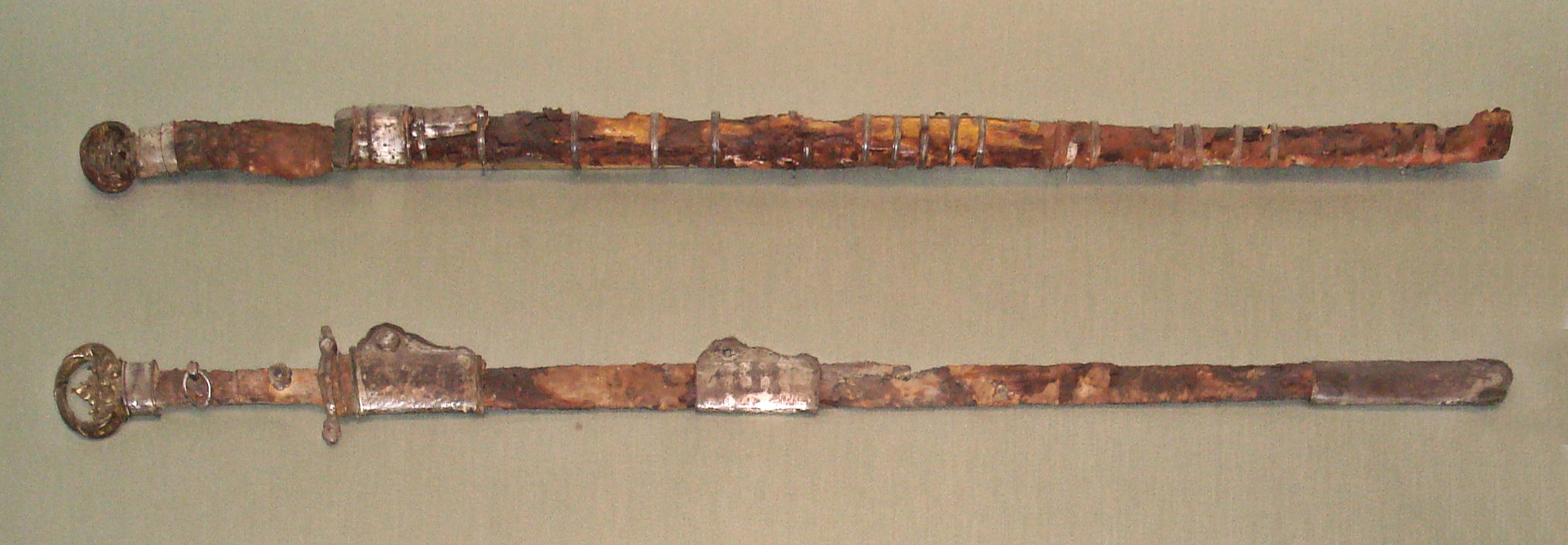
Sui dynasty swords

In the 6th century, Qimu Huaiwen introduced to Northern Qi the process of 'co-fusion' steelmaking, which used metals of different carbon contents to create steel. Apparently, daos made using this method were capable of penetrating 30 armour lamellae. It's not clear if the armour was of iron or leather.

Huaiwen made sabres [dao 刀] of 'overnight iron' [su tie 宿鐵]. His method was to anneal [shao 燒] powdered cast iron [sheng tie jing 生鐵精] with layers of soft [iron] blanks [ding 鋌, presumably thin plates]. After several days the result is steel [gang 剛]. Soft iron was used for the spine of the sabre; he washed it in the urine of the Five Sacrificial Animals and quench-hardened it in the fat of the Five Sacrificial Animals: [Such a sabre] could penetrate thirty armour lamellae [zha 札]. The 'overnight soft blanks' [Su rou ting 宿柔鋌] cast today [in the Sui period?] by the metallurgists of Xiangguo 襄國 represent a vestige of [Qiwu Huaiwen's] technique. The sabres which they make are still extremely sharp, but they cannot penetrate thirty lamellae.

== Tang dynasty (618–907) ==
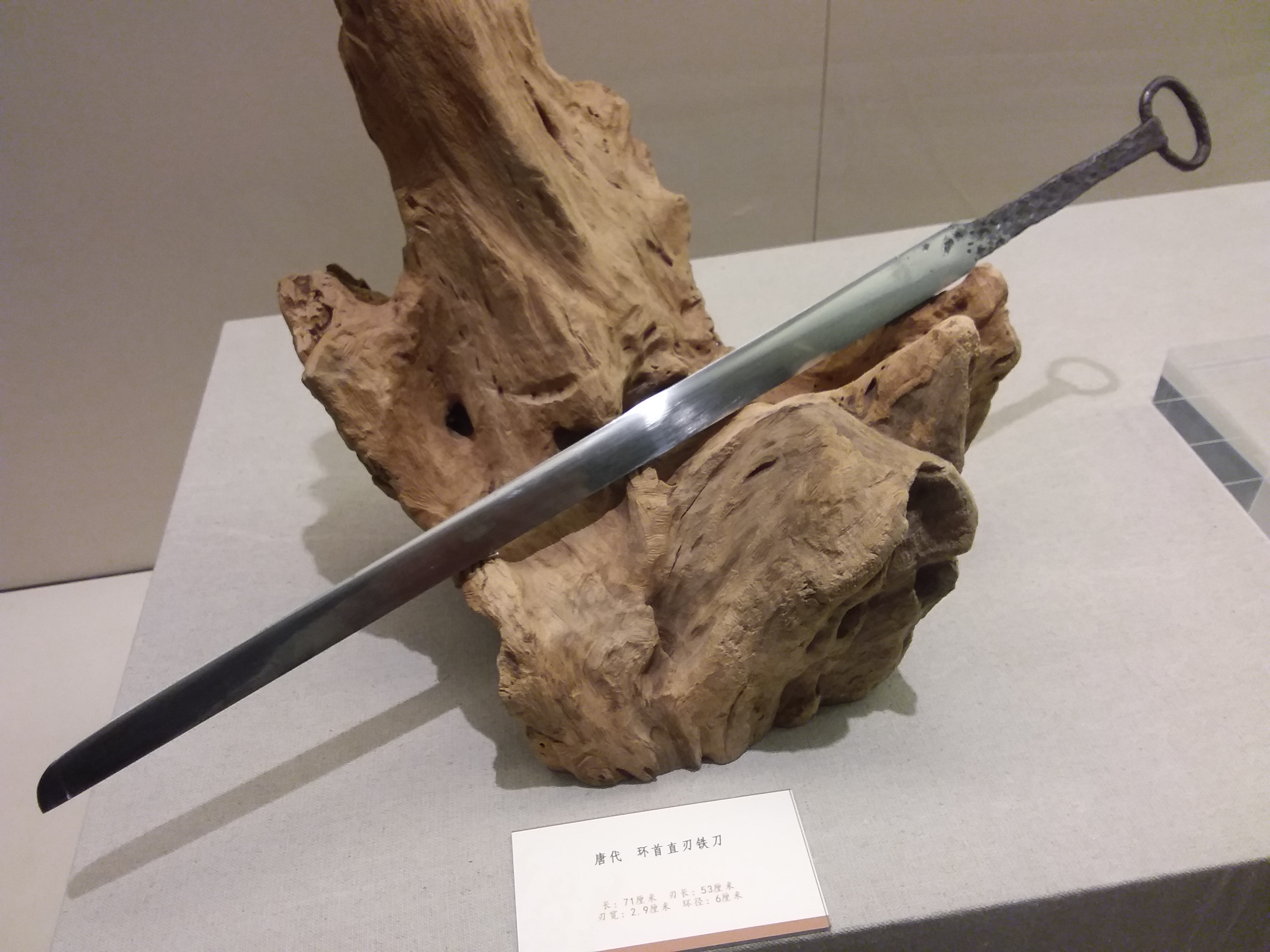
Tang dao with ring pommel, length: 71cm, Tang dynasty

The dao was separated into four categories during the Tang dynasty. These were the Ceremonial Dao 儀刀, Defense Dao 障刀, Cross Dao 橫刀, and Divided Dao 陌刀. The Ceremonial Dao was a court item usually decorated with gold and silver. It was also known as the "Imperial Sword". The Defense Dao does not have any specifications but its name is self-explanatory. The Cross Dao was a waist weapon worn on the belt, hence its older name, the Belt Dao. It was often carried as a sidearm by crossbowmen. The Divided Dao, also called a Long Dao (long saber), was a cross between a polearm and a saber. It consisted of a 91 cm (36 in) blade fixed to a long 120 cm (47 in) handle ending in an iron butt point, although exceptionally large weapons reaching 3 m (9.8 ft) in length and weighing 10.2 kg (22 lb) have been mentioned. Divided daos were wielded by elite Tang vanguard forces and used to spearhead attacks.

In one army, there are 12,500 officers and men. Ten thousand men in eight sections bearing Belt Daos; Two thousand five hundred men in two sections with Divided Daos.

— Taibai Yinjing

== Song dynasty (960–1279) ==
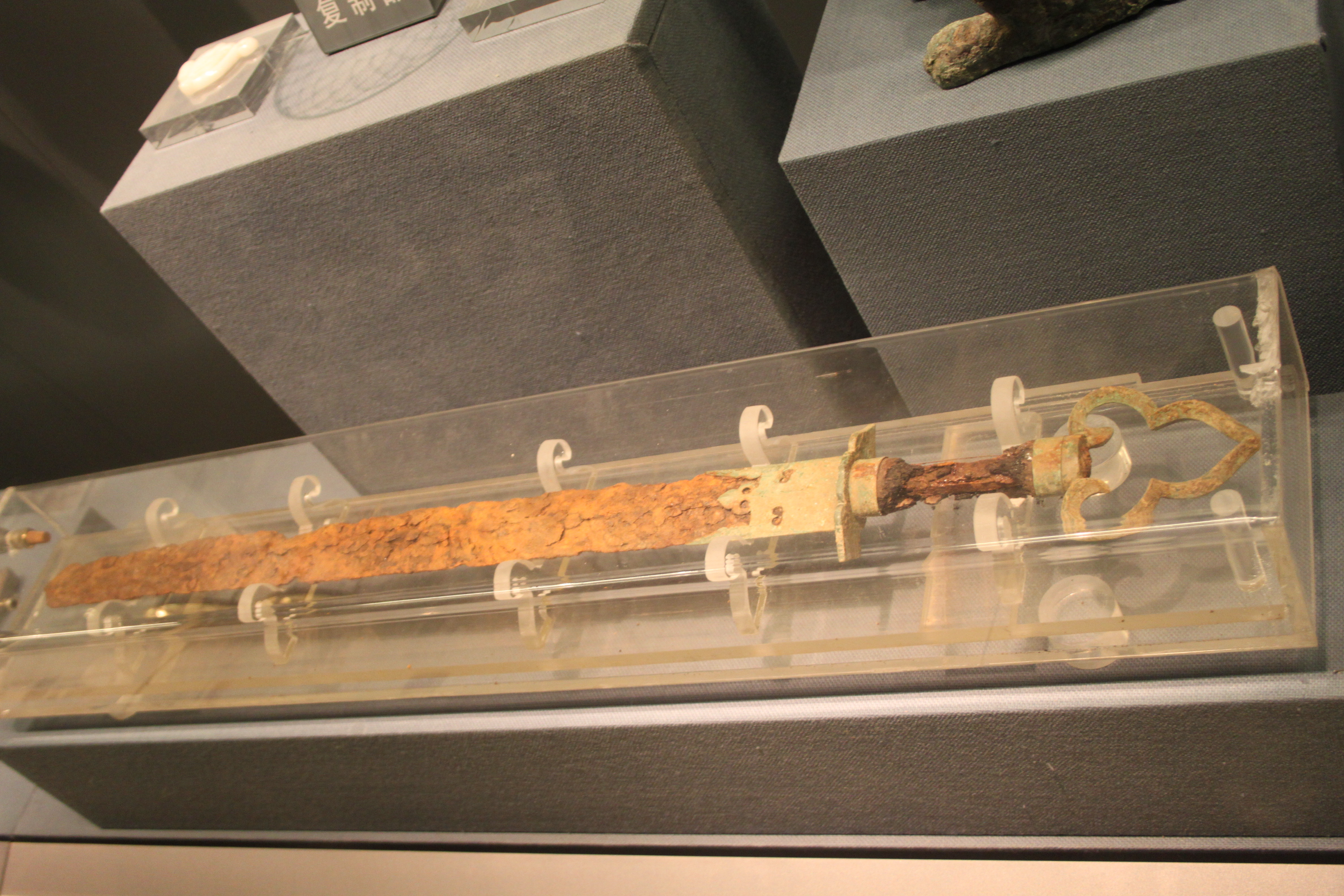
Jin dynasty (1115-1234) iron jian

Some warriors and bandits dual-wielded daos to break deadlocks in confined terrain during the late Song dynasty.

Many of the Song dynasty's soldiers wielded 2 handed long swords as their weapon to fight against the incoming nomadic cavalry of the North. According to the Xu Zizhi Tongjian Changbian, written in 1183, the "Horse Beheading Dao" (zhanmadao) was a two handed long saber with a 93.6 cm (36.9 in) blade, 31.2 cm (12.3 in) hilt, and ring pommel. The zhanmadao was the main 2 handed long sword used against cavalry, but other long sabers like the podao and modao were also used.

Besides very long swords, the Song dynasty also used short but wide daos as sidearms called Shou Dao(手刀), meaning "hand saber". These daos were good for short range melee, being short and easy to move but also thick and having the force to chop through heavy armor.

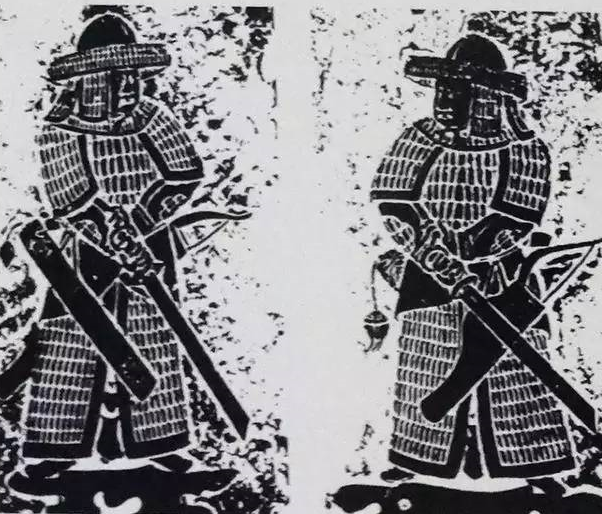
Song soldiers carrying daos

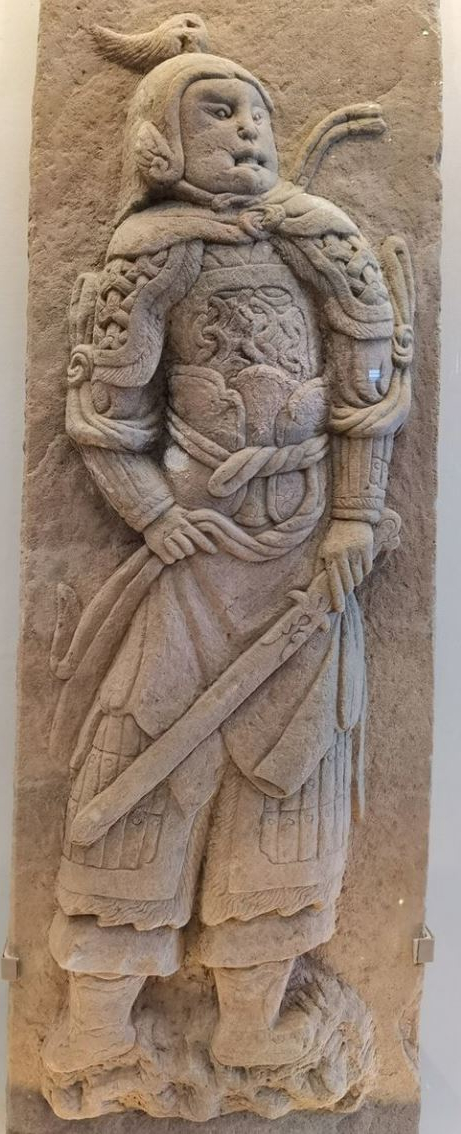
Song stone relief of a swordsman wearing mountain pattern and mail armour

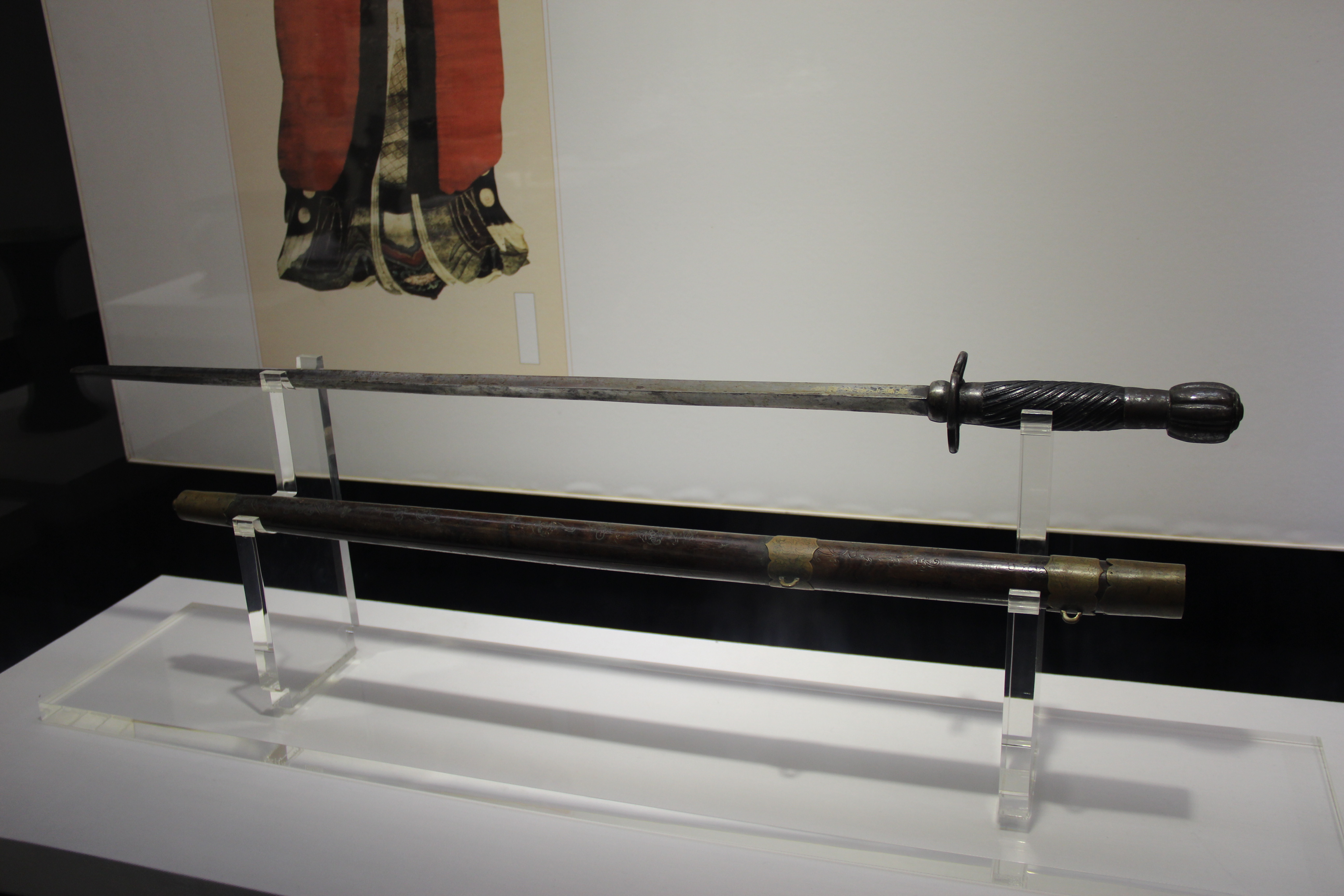
Truncheon, Song dynasty

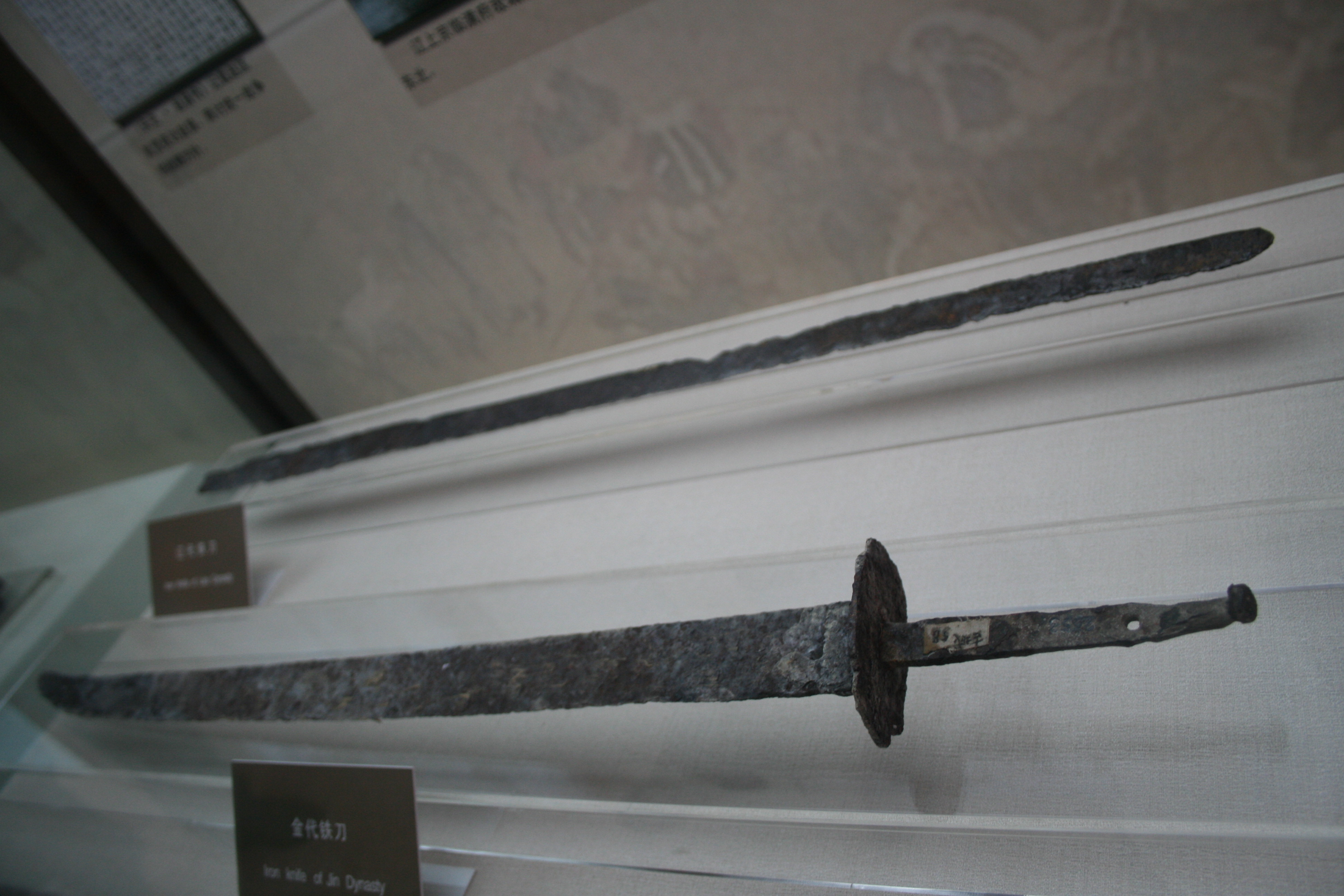
Liao and Jin swords

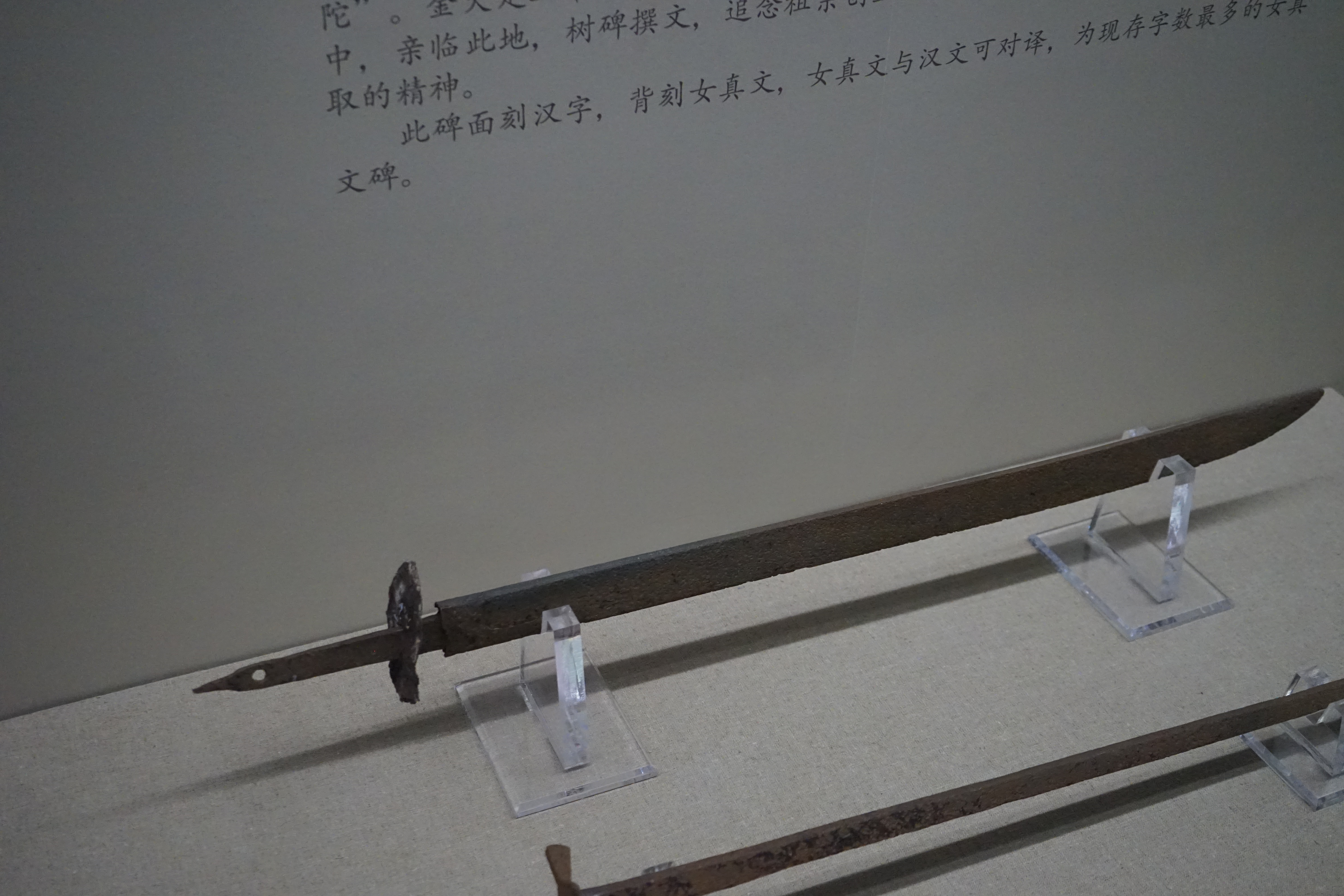
Jin dao sabre

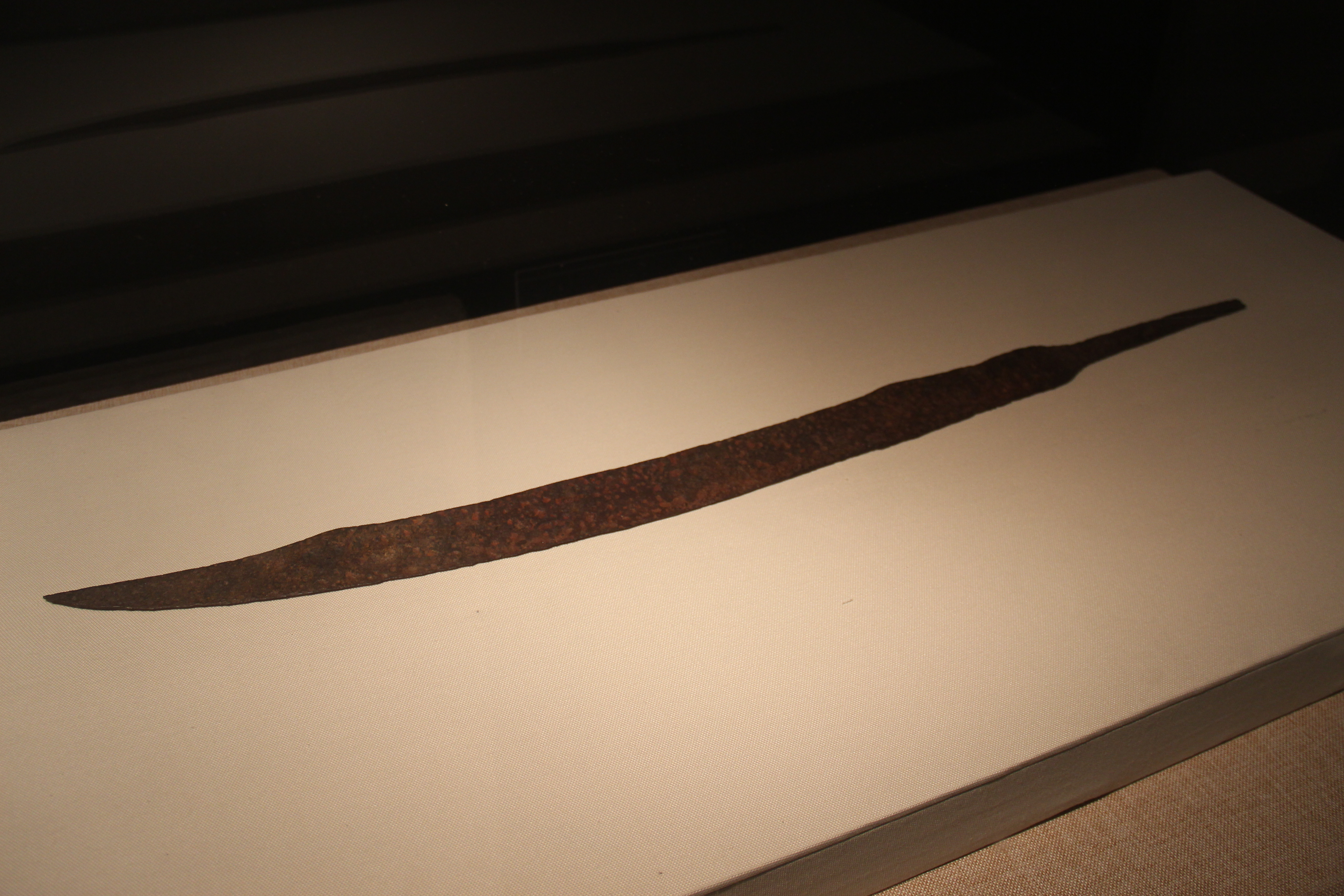
Yuan dao

== Yuan dynasty (1279–1368) ==
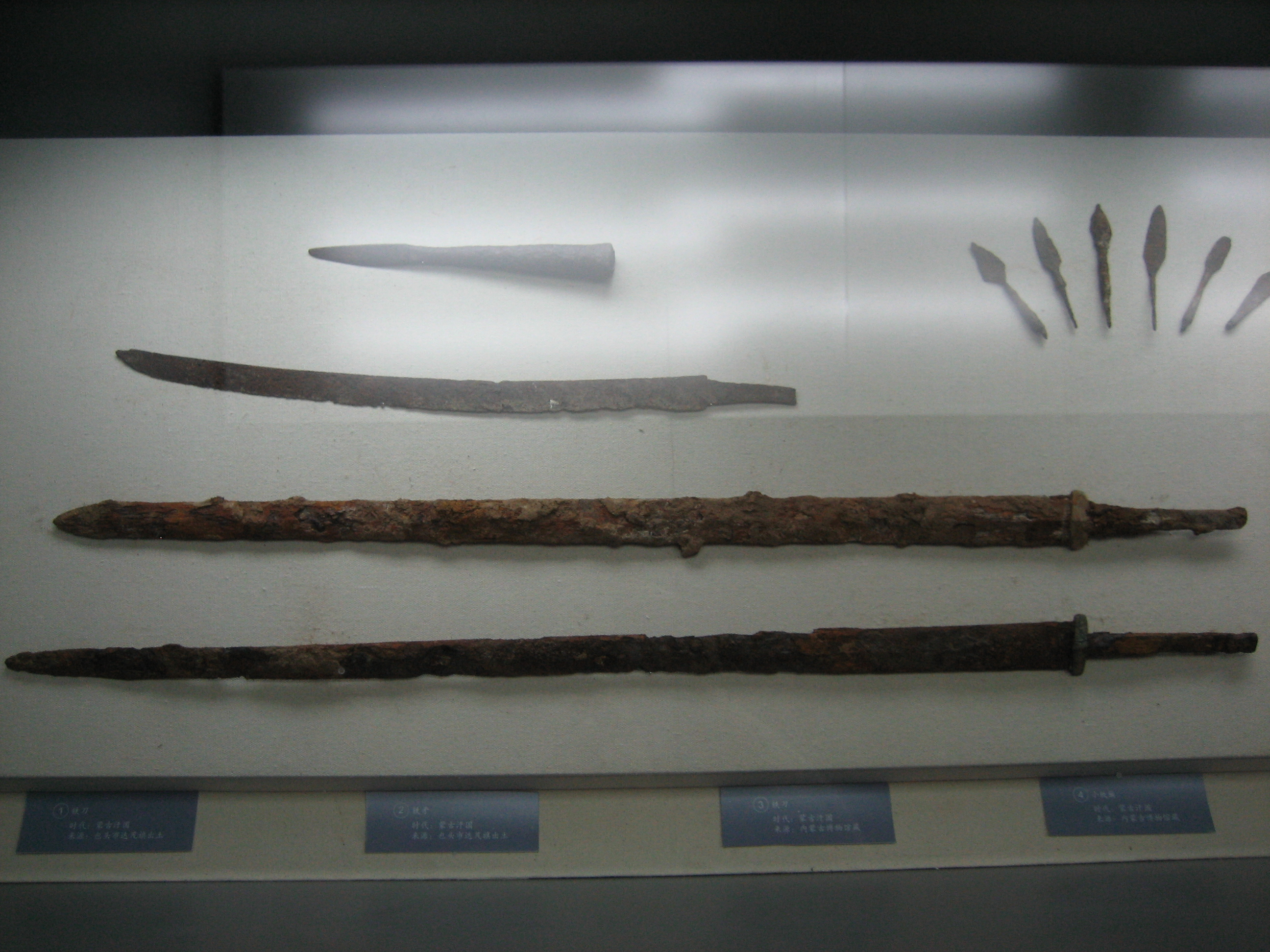
Chinese style jian from the Mongol Empire era

The Yuan dynasty was ruled by Mongols. The Mongolian (Turko-Mongol) saber, also called the Mongolian scimitar, became the standard sword. Because the Mongols and Turks specialized in horse riding, the standard sword was a cavalry-use sword that could be used with ease on horseback or as a sidearm to bows.

== Ming dynasty (1368–1644) ==
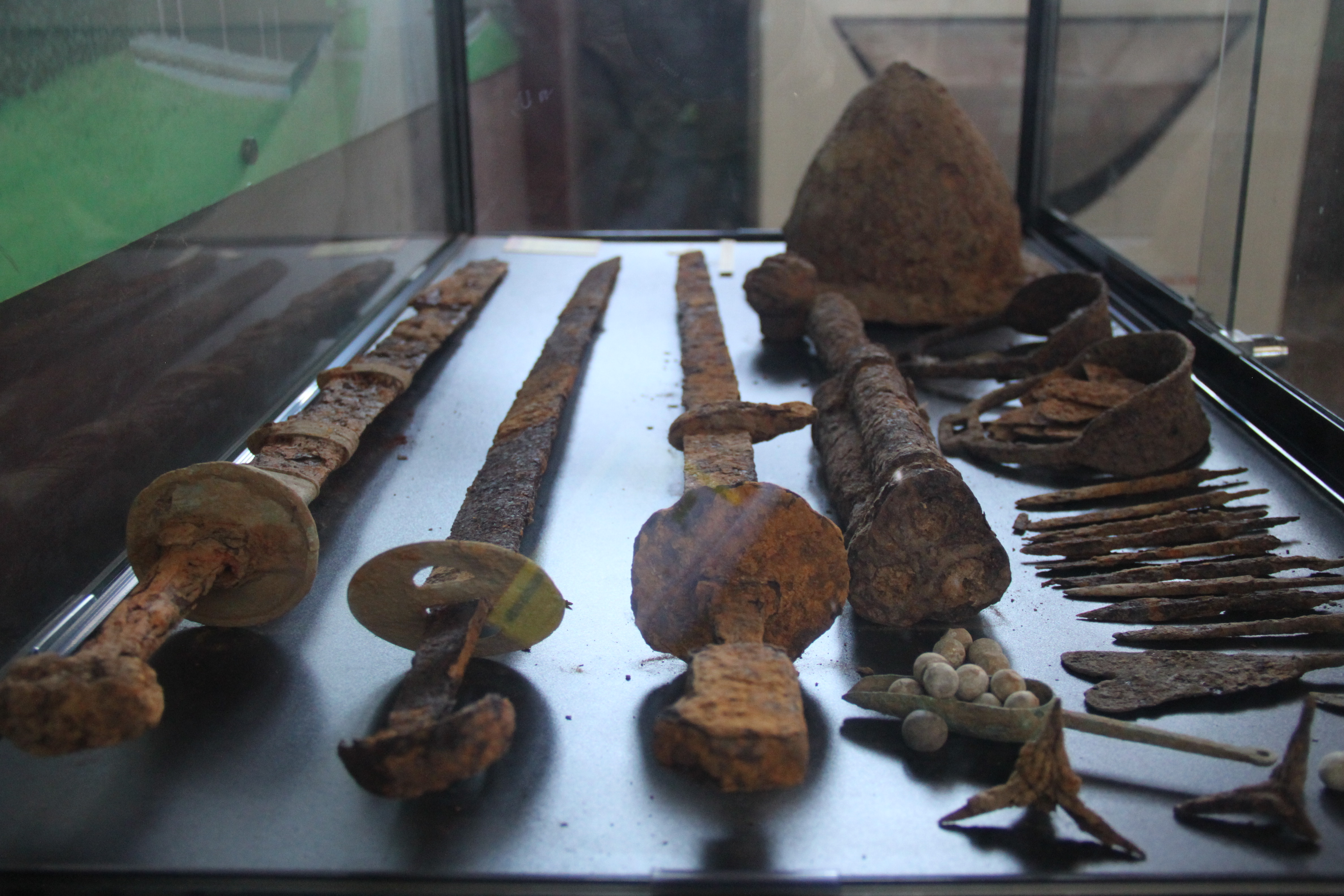
Jurchen swords

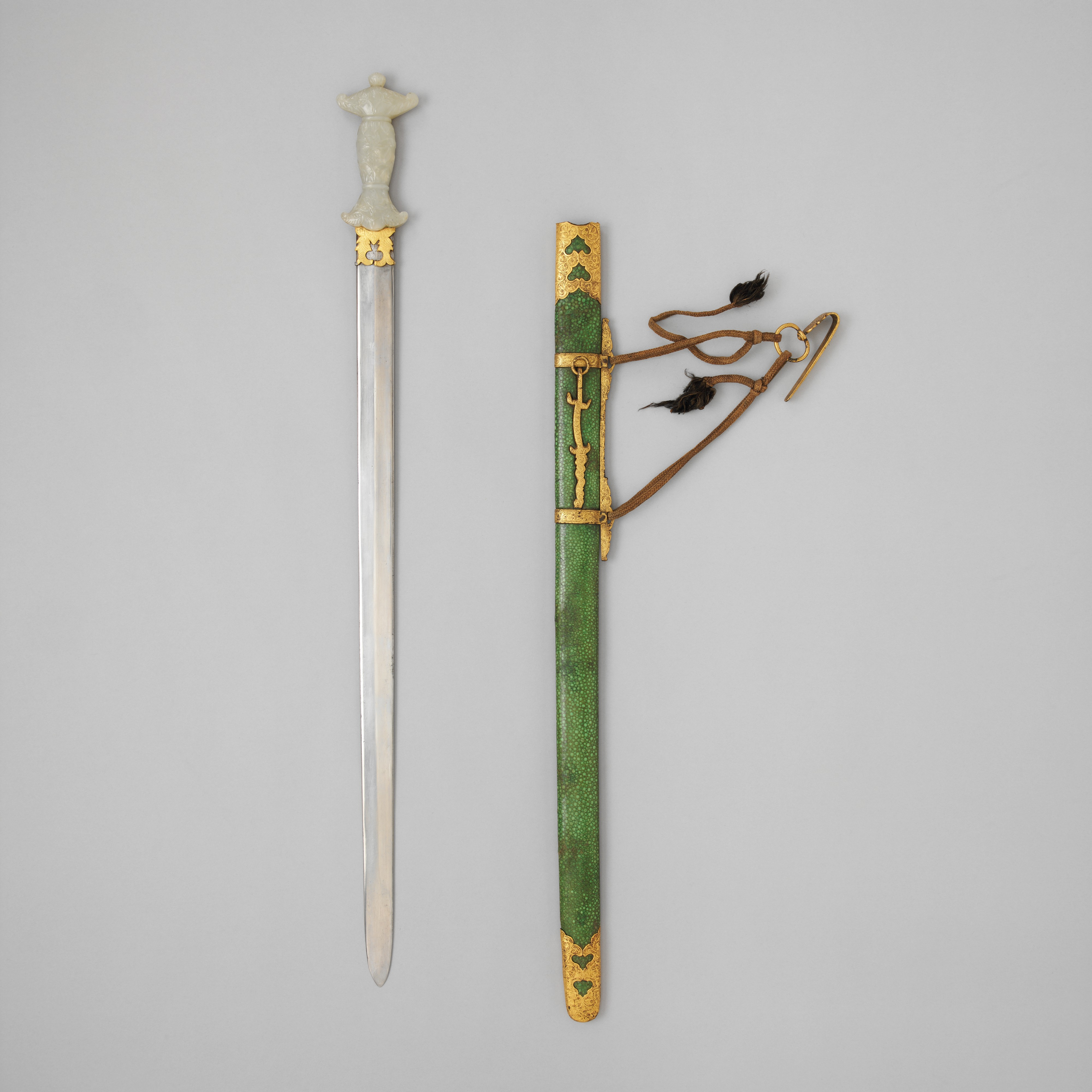
Qing dynasty jian with jade hilt

The dao continued to fill the role of the basic close combat weapon. The jian fell out of favor again in the Ming era but saw limited use by a small number of arms specialists. It was otherwise known for its qualities as a marker of scholarly refinement.

The "Horse Beheading Dao" was described in Ming sources as a 96 cm (38 in) blade attached to a 128 cm (50 in) shaft, essentially a glaive. It's speculated that the Swede Frederick Coyett was talking about this weapon when he described Zheng Chenggong's troops wielding "with both hands a formidable battle-sword fixed to a stick half the length of a man".

Some were armed with bows and arrows hanging down their backs; others had nothing save a shield on the left arm and a good sword in the right hand; while many wielded with both hands a formidable battle sword fixed to a stick half the length of a man. Everyone was protected over the upper part of the body with a coat of iron scales, fitting below one another like the slates of a roof, the arms and legs bare. This afforded complete protection from rifle bullets (mistranslation: should read "small arms") and yet left ample freedom to move, as those coats only reached down to the knees and were very flexible at all the joints. The archers formed Koxinga's best troops and depended much on them. Even at a distance, they contrived to handle their weapons with such great skill that they nearly eclipsed the riflemen. The shield bearers were used instead of cavalry. Every tenth man of them is a leader, who takes charge of, and presses his men to force themselves into the enemy ranks. With bent heads and their bodies hidden behind the shields, they try to break through the opposing ranks with such fury and dauntless courage as if each one still had a spare body left at home. They continually press onwards, notwithstanding many are shot down; not stopping to consider, but ever rushing forward like mad dogs, not even looking round to see whether their comrades follow them or not. Those with the sword-sticks—called soapknives by the Hollanders—render the same service as our lancers in preventing all breaking through of the enemy and, in this way, establishing perfect order in the ranks; but when the enemy has been thrown into disorder, the Sword-bearers follow this up with fearful massacre amongst the fugitives.

— Frederick Coyett

Qi Jiguang deployed his soldiers in a 12-man 'mandarin duck' formation, which consisted of four pikemen, two men carrying daos with a great and small shield, two 'wolf brush' wielders, a rearguard officer, and a porter.

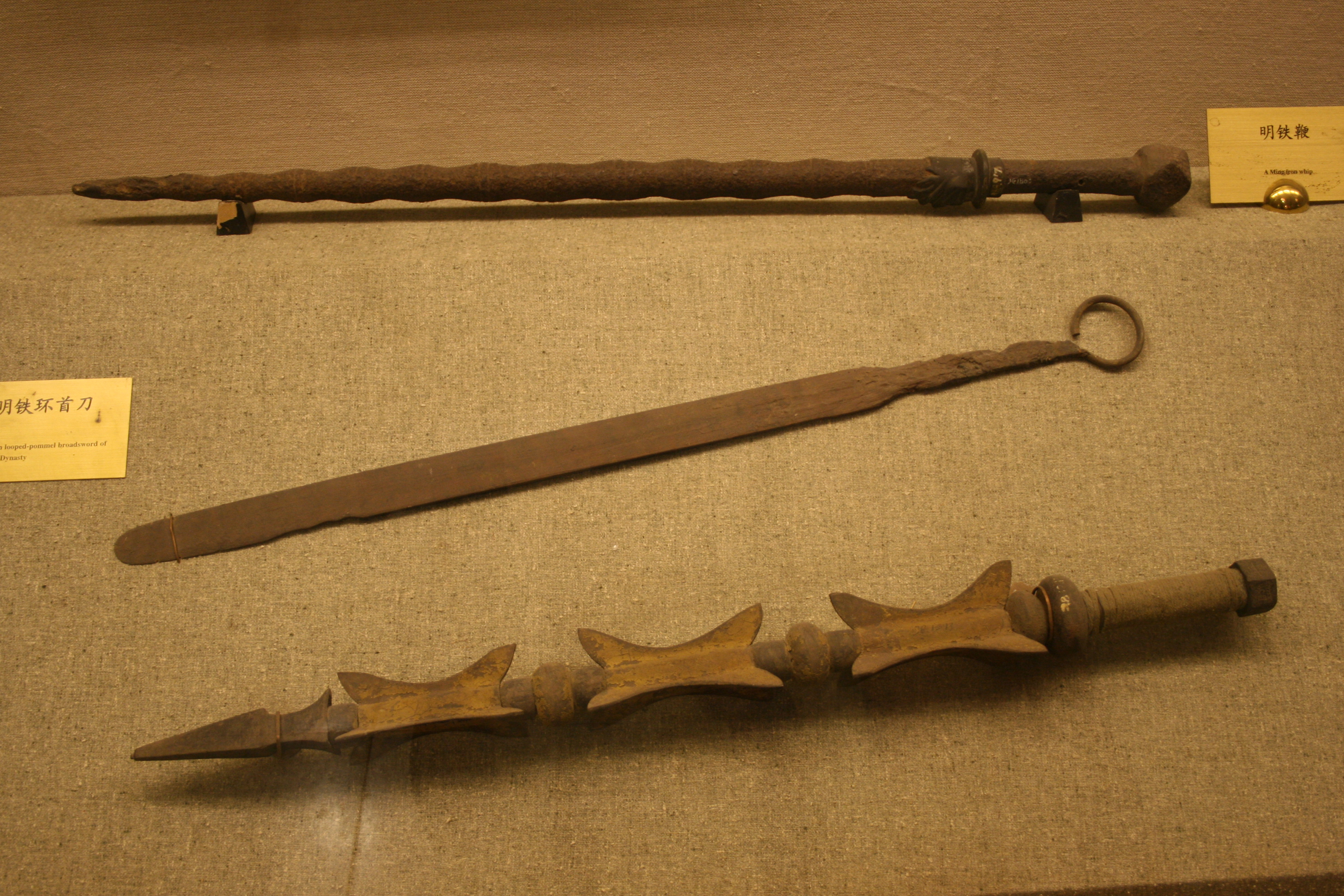
Ming whip, truncheon, and dao

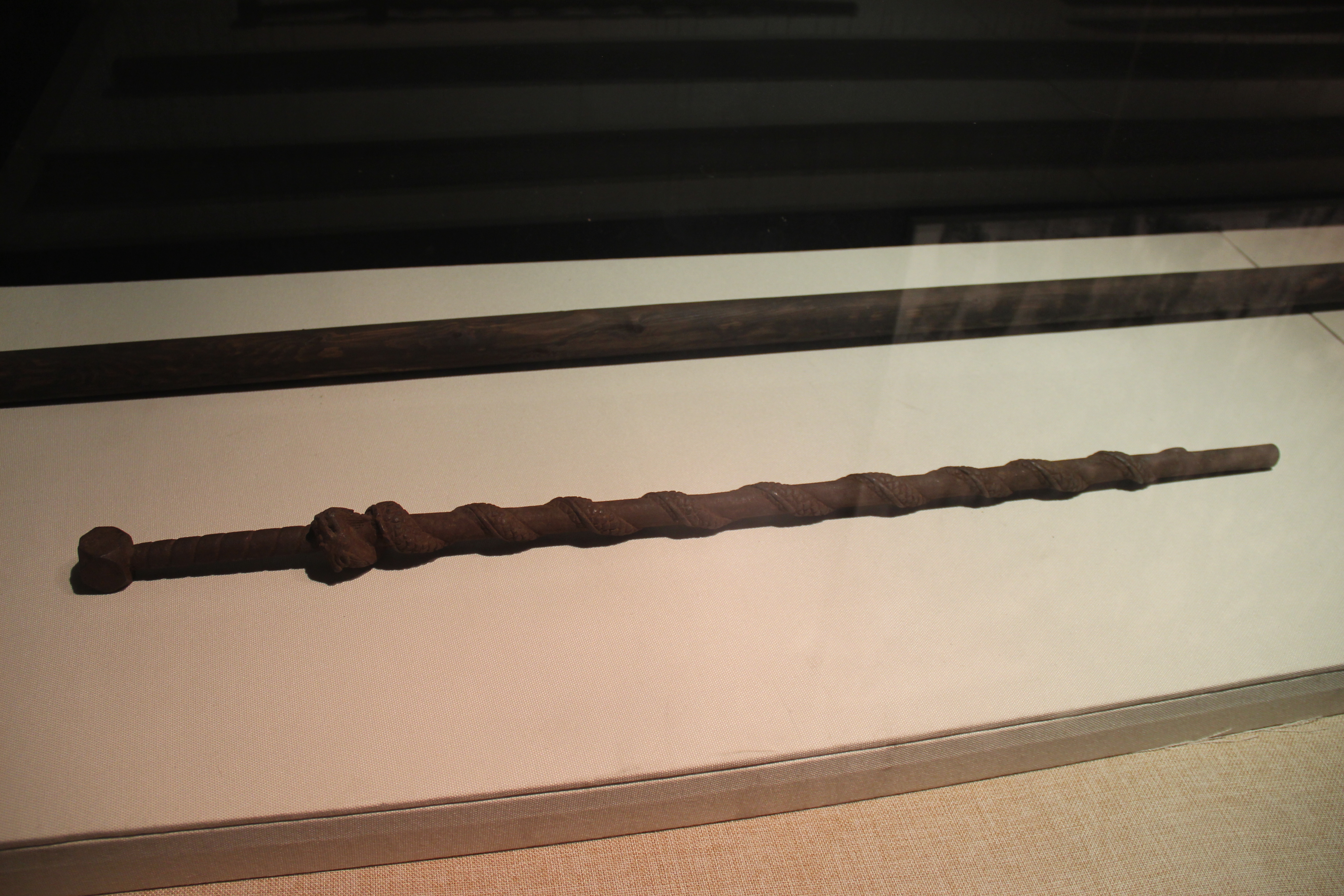
Ming truncheon

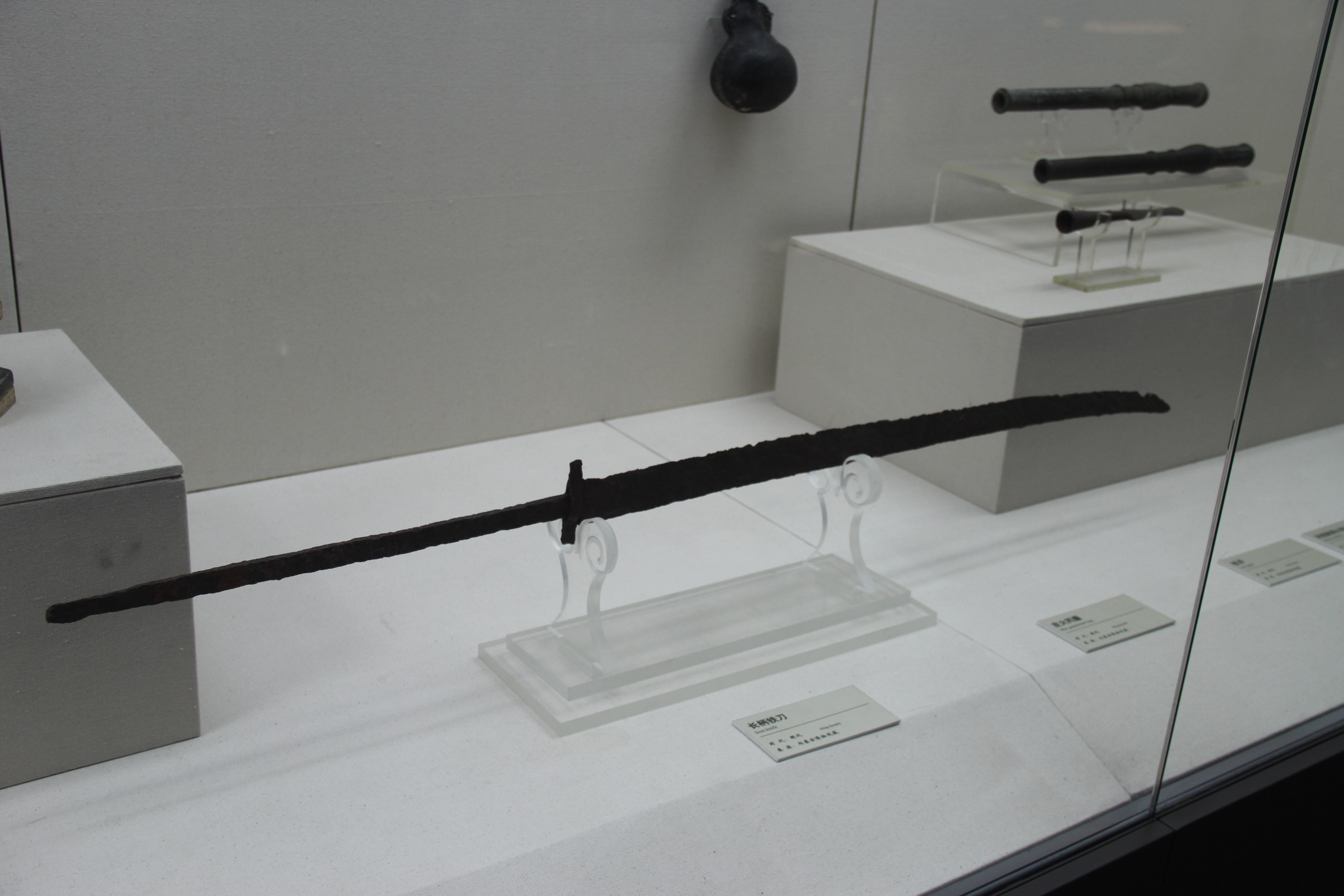
Ming dao

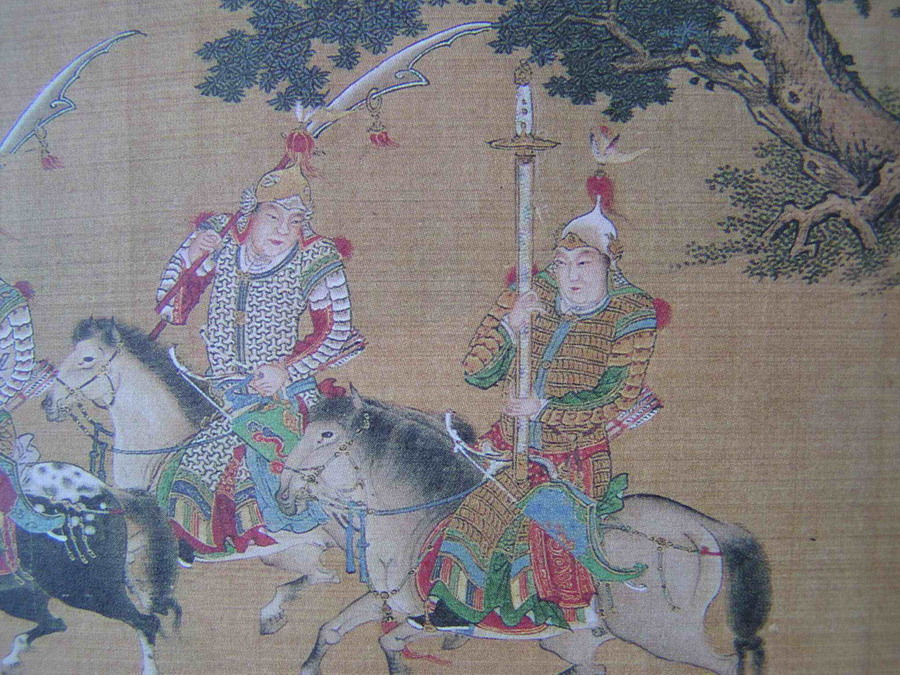
Ming soldiers carrying a dao and jian

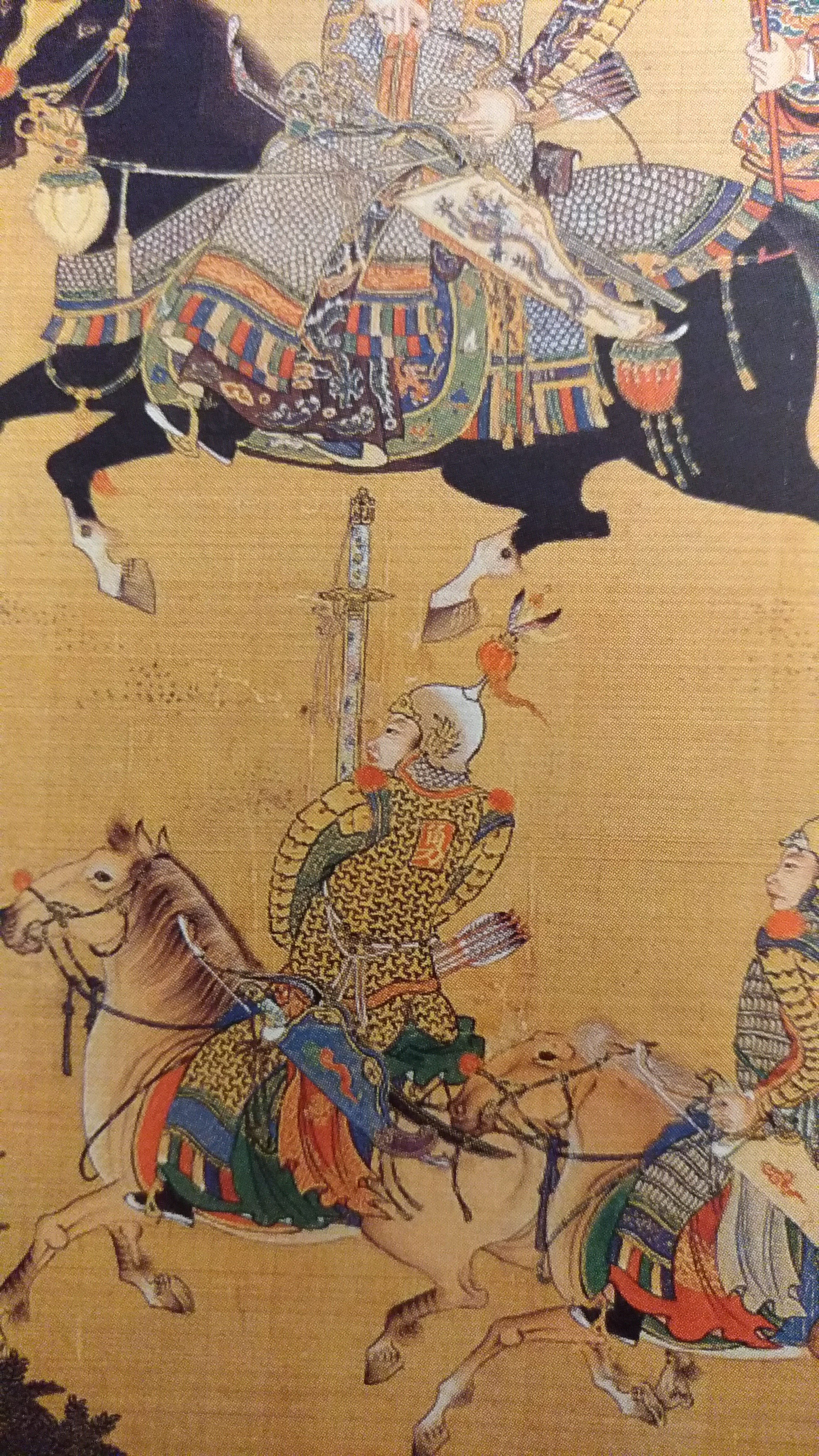
Ming soldier carrying a jian

== Ming-Qing sword types ==
| Image | Name | Era | Description |
|---|---|---|---|
| | Butterfly sword | | Sometimes called butterfly knives in English. It was originally from southern China, though it has seen use in the north. It is usually wielded in pairs and has a short dao (single-edged blade), with a length approximately that of the forearm. This allows for easy concealment within the sleeves or inside boots and for greater manoeuvrability to spin and rotate in close-quarters fighting. |
| | Changdao | Ming dynasty | A type of anti-cavalry sword used in China during the Ming dynasty. Sometimes called miao dao (a similar but more recent weapon), the blade greatly resembles a Japanese ōdachi in form. |
| | Dadao | | Also known as the Chinese great sword. Based on agricultural knives, dadao have broad blades generally between two and three feet long, long hilts meant for "hand and a half" or two-handed use, and naturally a weight-forward balance. |
| | Hook sword | | The hook sword is an exotic Chinese weapon traditionally associated with Northern styles of Chinese martial arts, but now often practised by Southern styles as well. |
| | Jian | | The jian is a double-edged straight sword used in China for the last 2,500 years. The first Chinese sources that mention the jian date to the 7th century BC during the Spring and Autumn period; one of the earliest specimens being the Sword of Goujian. Historical one-handed versions have blades varying from 45 to 80 centimeters (17.7 to 31.5 inches) in length. The weight of an average sword of 70-centimeter (28-inch) blade-length would be in a range of approximately 700 to 900 grams (1.5 to 2 pounds). There are also larger two-handed versions used for training by many styles of Chinese martial arts. In Chinese folklore, it is known as the "Gentleman of Weapons" and is considered one of the four major weapons, along with the gun (staff), qiang (spear), and the dao. |
| | Liuyedao | | The liuye dao, or "willow leaf saber", is a type of dao that was commonly used as a military sidearm for both cavalry and infantry during the Ming and Qing dynasties. This weapon features a moderate curve along the length of the blade. This reduces thrusting ability (though it is still fairly effective at same) while increasing the power of cuts and slashes. |
| | Miaodao | Republican era | A Chinese two-handed dao or saber of the Republican era, with a narrow blade of up to 1.2 m (3 ft 11 in) or more and a long hilt. The name means "sprout saber", presumably referring to a likeness between the weapon and a newly sprouted plant. While the miaodao is a recent weapon, the name has come to be applied to a variety of earlier Chinese long sabers, such as the zhanmadao and changdao. Along with the dadao, miaodao were used by some Chinese troops during the Second Sino-Japanese War. |
| | Nandao | | Nandao is a kind of sword that is nowadays used mostly in contemporary wushu exercises and forms. It is the southern variation of the "northern broadsword", or Beidao. Its blade bears some resemblance to the butterfly sword, also a southern Chinese single-bladed weapon; the main difference is the size and the fact that the butterfly swords are always used in pairs |
| | Niuweidao | Late Qing dynasty | A type of Chinese saber (dao) of the late Qing dynasty. It was primarily a civilian weapon, as imperial troops were never issued it. |
| | Piandao | Late Ming dynasty | A type of Chinese sabre (dao) used during the late Ming dynasty. A deeply curved dao meant for slashing and draw-cutting, it bore a strong resemblance to the shamshir and scimitar. A fairly uncommon weapon, it was used by skirmishers in conjunction with a shield. |
| | Wodao | Ming dynasty | A Chinese sword from the Ming dynasty. Apparently influenced by Japanese sword design, it bears a strong resemblance to a tachi or ōdachi in form: extant examples show a handle approximately 25.5 cm (10.0 in) long, with a gently curved blade 80 cm (31 in) long. |
| | Yanmaodao | Late Ming—Qing dynasties | The yanmao dao, or "goose quill saber", is a type of dao made in large numbers as a standard military weapon from the late Ming dynasty through the end of the Qing dynasty. It is similar to the earlier zhibei dao, is largely straight, with a curve appearing at the center of percussion near the blade's tip. This allows for thrusting attacks and overall handling similar to that of the jian, while preserving much of the dao's strengths in cutting and slashing. |
| | Zhanmadao | Song dynasty | A single-edged, broad-bladed sword with a long handle suitable for two-handed use. Dating to 1072, it was used as an anti-cavalry weapon. |
| | | | This list is incomplete. There are many more types of both jian and dao |

== See also ==
- Chinese swordsmanship
- Taijijian
- Chinese armour
- Chinese siege weapons
- Weapons and armor in Chinese mythology
- Japanese sword
- Indian sword
- Korean sword

== Bibliography ==
- Andrade, Tonio (2016), The Gunpowder Age: China, Military Innovation, and the Rise of the West in World History, Princeton University Press, ISBN 978-0-691-13597-7.
- Behr, Wolfgang (2002). "Stray loanword gleanings from two Ancient Chinese fictional texts". 16e Journées de Linguistique d'Asie Orientale, Centre de Recherches Linguistiques Sur l'Asie Orientale (E.H.E.S.S.), Paris: 1–6.
- Brindley, Erica Fox (2015), Ancient China and the Yue, Cambridge: Cambridge University Press, ISBN 978-1-107-08478-0.
- Brindley, Erica Fox (2003), "Barbarians or Not? Ethnicity and Changing Conceptions of the Ancient Yue (Viet) Peoples, ca. 400–50 BC" (PDF), Asia Major, vol. 16, Academia Sinica, pp. 1–32, JSTOR 41649870.
- Coyet, Frederic (1975), Neglected Formosa: a translation from the Dutch of Frederic Coyett's Verwaerloosde Formosa
- Crespigny, Rafe de (2017), Fire Over Luoyang: A History of the Later Han Dynasty, 23–220 AD, Brill
- Graff, David A. (2002), Medieval Chinese Warfare, 300–900, Routledge
- Graff, David A. (2016), The Eurasian Way of War: Military practice in seventh-century China and Byzantium, Routledge
- Kitamura, Takai (1999), Zhanlue Zhanshu Bingqi: Zhongguo Zhonggu Pian, Gakken
- Lorge, Peter A. (2011), Chinese Martial Arts: From Antiquity to the Twenty-First Century, Cambridge: Cambridge University Press, ISBN 978-0-521-87881-4
- Lorge, Peter (2015), The Reunification of China: Peace through War under the Song Dynasty, Cambridge University Press
- Milburn, Olivia (2010), The Glory of Yue
- Peers, C.J. (1990), Ancient Chinese Armies: 1500-200BC, Osprey Publishing
- Peers, C.J. (1992), Medieval Chinese Armies: 1260–1520, Osprey Publishing
- Peers, C.J. (1995), Imperial Chinese Armies (1): 200BC-AD589, Osprey Publishing
- Peers, C.J. (1996), Imperial Chinese Armies (2): 590-1260AD, Osprey Publishing
- Peers, C.J. (2006), Soldiers of the Dragon: Chinese Armies 1500 BC – AD 1840, Osprey Publishing Ltd
- Peers, Chris (2013), Battles of Ancient China, Pen & Sword Military
- Perdue, Peter C. (2005), China Marches West, The Belknap Press of Harvard University Press
- Robinson, K.G. (2004), Science and Civilization in China Volume 7 Part 2: General Conclusions and Reflections, Cambridge University Press
- Swope, Kenneth M. (2009), A Dragon's Head and a Serpent's Tail: Ming China and the First Great East Asian War, 1592–1598, University of Oklahoma Press
- Wood, W. W. (1830), Sketches of China
- Wagner, Donald B. (1996), Iron and Steel in Ancient China, E.J. Brill
- Wagner, Donald B. (2008), Science and Civilization in China Volume 5–11: Ferrous Metallurgy, Cambridge University Press
- Wright, David (2005), From War to Diplomatic Parity in Eleventh Century China, Brill
- Late Imperial Chinese Armies: 1520–1840 C.J. Peers, Illustrated by Christa Hook, Osprey Publishing «Men-at-arms», ISBN 1-85532-655-8
