= The Rebirth of a King =

Chinese television series

- DVD cover art
- 越王勾践
- Genre: Historical drama
- Written by: Zhang Jing
- Directed by: Huang Jianzhong; Yuen Bun; Yanyi
- Presented by: Li Peisen
- Starring: Chen Baoguo; Bao Guo'an; You Yong; Li Guangjie; Zhou Yang
- Country of origin: China
- Original language: Mandarin
- No. of episodes: 41

Production
- Executive producers: Li Gongda; Li Zhi'an; Xu Hui; Zhu Aiwu
- Producers: Li Ting; Gou Peng; Huang Songbao; Wang Yuming; Li Xiaohua; Yu Min
- Production location: China
- Running time: ≈45 minutes per episode
- Production company: CCTV

Original release
- Network: TVB; CCTV-11

The Rebirth of a King (越王勾践) is a Chinese historical television series based on the life of King Goujian of the state of Yue during the Spring and Autumn period of ancient China. Directed by Huang Jianzhong, Yuen Bun and Yanyi, the series starred Chen Baoguo, Bao Guo'an, You Yong, Li Guangjie, and Zhou Yang. The series was first aired on TVB in November 2006 in Hong Kong and a year later on CCTV in mainland China.

== Cast ==
- Chen Baoguo as King Goujian of Yue
- Bao Guo'an as Wu Zixu
- You Yong as King Fuchai of Wu
- Li Guangjie as Fan Li
- Zhou Yang as Xishi
- Yao Anlian as Bo Pi
- Zhang Tong as Wen Zhong
- Tan Xiaoyan as Goujian's wife
- Yu Jiaruo as Zheng Dan
- Wan Yaoyao as Consort Wei
- Liu Xiyuan as Lingyu
- Liu Jingjing as Yuexiu
- Geng Xiaolin as Lu Jia
- Bi Haifeng as Duan Ke
- Hu Kaizhi as younger Qiying
  - Liu Xiaohai as older Qiying
- Liu Yanbin as Gongsun Ju
- Zhang Di as Ju Zhu
- Li Xianqi as Ji Ni
- Liu Lian as Ye Yong
- Guo Chao as Du Yuan, Du Ye
- Wang Xiao as Zhao Yang
- Yu Zikuan as Ou Yezi
- Liu Jun as Gan Jiang
- Yang Xiaoyang as Mo Ye
- Ren Wu as Zhongli Jian
- Zhong Lin as Master Ma
- Hou Yu as Zhong Ji
- Hu Zhiyong as General Yu
- Sun Baohai as General Gu

== See also ==
- The Conquest (TV series)
- The Great Revival
