= The Great Revival =

- DVD cover art
- 卧薪尝胆
- Genre: Historical drama
- Written by: Li Senxiang
- Directed by: Hou Yong
- Presented by: Li Jian; Xiao Quan
- Starring: Chen Daoming; Hu Jun; Zuo Xiaoqing; Jia Yiping; Wang Bing; Ding Yongdai; Zheng Tianyong; Ady An
- Opening theme: "In the Distance" (远方)
- Ending theme: "A Great King" (千古一王) performed by Han Lei and Tan Weiwei
- Composer: Zhou Zhiyong
- Country of origin: China
- Original language: Mandarin
- No. of episodes: 41

Production
- Executive producers: Yu Kangchun; Mu Xiaoguang; Zhang Hua; Li Zhao; Wei Yuehan; Ying Zhiqi; Wang Taifeng; Chen Meihang
- Producer: Yu Shengli
- Production location: China
- Cinematography: Shi Luan
- Editor: Liu Hua
- Running time: ≈45 minutes per episode
- Production companies: China Film and TV Production; Beijing Huanle Media Art; Jiangsu Provincial Committee Propaganda Department

Original release
- Network: CCTV-8
- Release: 10 January – 24 January 2007

The Great Revival (卧薪尝胆) is a Chinese historical television series based on the conflict between the Yue and Wu states during the Spring and Autumn period. The Chinese title of the series is a chengyu derived from King Goujian of Yue's perseverance in overcoming the odds to revive the fallen state of Yue and conquer the rival state of Wu. The series was first broadcast on CCTV-8 in mainland China in January 2007.

== Cast ==
- Chen Daoming as King Goujian of Yue
- Hu Jun as King Fuchai of Wu
- Zuo Xiaoqing as Ya Yu
- Jia Yiping as Fan Li
- Wang Bing as Wu Zixu
- Ding Yongdai as Bo Pi
- Zheng Tianyong as Wen Zhong
- Ady An as Xishi
- Ge Zhijun as Shi Mai
- Chen Zhihui as Ling Gufu
- Zhao Shengsheng as Wang Sunluo
- Zhang Chenghao as Gongsun Xiong
- Sun Bin as Ku Cheng
- Gao Tianhao as Zhu Qiying
- Lu Yong as Yan Ying
- Su Ying as Hao Jin
- Yu Yang as Hei Yi
- Xi Yuli as Ji Wan
- Lu Guanting as Yuan Luo
- Liu Jialiang as Mo Buxie
- Wu Kegang as Jie Zibao
- Zhao Zihui as Zheng Dan
- Yang Xiaodan as Yan Zhu
- Zhang Ge as Xin Tian
- Ma Yong as Guan Sheng
- Zhao Yaodong as Crown Prince Bo
- Xue Haowen as Crown Prince You
- Zeng Hui as Prince Jiu
- Cao Huabo as Prince Bao
- Ma Jie as Jin Shi
- Rong Kuan as Xu An
- Wang Pei as Jia Yang
- Liu He as Si Nong
- Zhao Jian as Fuchai's vassal
- Shi Lei as Yu Yi
- Tian Hao as Jiu Bao
- Lu Shijie as Xin Buyi
- Miao Hongsen as a caretaker
- Yu Tongyun as Jin Xiang
- Ma Jingwu as King Yunchang of Yue
- Yang Zaibao as Ge Lu
- Bai Dezhang as Ye Yong
- Hong Yuzhou as Wang Zilei
- Sun Min as Fu Tong
- Shi Lan as Tang Li

== See also ==
- The Conquest (TV series)
- The Rebirth of a King
