= The Conquest (TV series) =

Hong Kong–Chinese television series

- The Conquest intertitle
- Genre: Historical drama
- Developed by: Xun Yifeng; Liang Bai
- Written by: Lau Choi-wan
- Directed by: Raymond Chai
- Starring: Joe Ma; Damian Lau; Chen Kun; Sonija Kwok
- Opening theme: "The Legendary Conquest" (争霸传奇) by Chen Kun
- Ending theme: "True Forever" (真永远) by Chen Kun
- Composer: Ben Li
- Countries of origin: Hong Kong; China
- Original languages: Cantonese (Hong Kong); Mandarin (Mainland China)
- No. of episodes: 42 (Hong Kong); 49 (Mainland China)

Production
- Executive producers: Tommy Leung; Raymond Chai
- Producer: Fei Yu
- Production location: China
- Running time: ≈45 minutes per episode
- Production companies: TVB; CCTV

Original release
- Network: Jade; ZJSTV
- Release: 18 December 2006 – 10 February 2007

TVB promotional poster

The Conquest (爭霸) is a historical television series based on the conflict between the states of Wu and Yue during the Spring and Autumn period of ancient China. The series was jointly produced by Hong Kong's TVB and mainland China's CCTV under executive producers Tommy Leung and Raymond Chai. It was renamed to Legend of the Heroic Duo (争霸传奇) for the mainland China release, where it aired two episodes every night on Zhejiang Satellite TV (ZJSTV) from 6 June to 28 June 2006, totalling 49 episodes. In Hong Kong, The Conquest aired five days a week on the TVB Jade network from 18 December 2006 to 10 February 2007, totalling 42 episodes.

== Cast ==
- Joe Ma as King Fuchai of Wu
- Damian Lau as King Goujian of Yue
- Chen Kun as Fan Li
- Sonija Kwok as Xishi
- Power Chan as Wen Zhong
- Fan Zhiqi as Wu Zixu
- Feng Shaofeng as Crown Prince You of Wu
- Bonnie Xian as Princess Tengjue of Yue
- Li Ming as Bo Pi
- Xu Baixiao as Crown Prince Luying of Yue
- Lin Hai as Heyi, Queen of Yue
- Yan Qin as Zheng Dan
- Jia Ni as Meisi, Queen of Wu
- Zhuo Fan as Wang Sunluo
- Xian Yan as Yuenu
- Wang Yi as Wu Feng
- Pan Hong as King of Qi
- Fu Xinyin as Princess of Chen
- Liu Weihua as King Helü of Wu

== Viewership ratings ==
The following is a table that includes a list of the total ratings points based on television viewership, derived from the TVB Jade network ratings in Hong Kong.

	Week	Episode	Average points	Peaking points	References
1	December 18–22, 2006	1–5	25		
2	December 25–29, 2006	6–10	25		
3	January 1–5, 2007	11–15	27		
4	January 8–12, 2007	16–20	28	30	
5	January 15–19, 2007	21–25	28		
6	January 22–26, 2007	26–30	28	29	
7	January 29 – February 2, 2007	31–35	29	32	
8	February 5–9, 2007	36–40	29		
9	February 10, 2007	41–42	28	30	

== Awards and nominations ==
40th TVB Anniversary Awards (2007)

- "Best Drama"
- "Best Actor in a Leading Role" (Joe Ma)
- "Best Actor in a Supporting Role" (Power Chan)

== See also ==
- The Rebirth of a King
- The Great Revival
- List of historical drama films of Asia
