= Spear of Fuchai =

Spear of King Fuchai of Wu

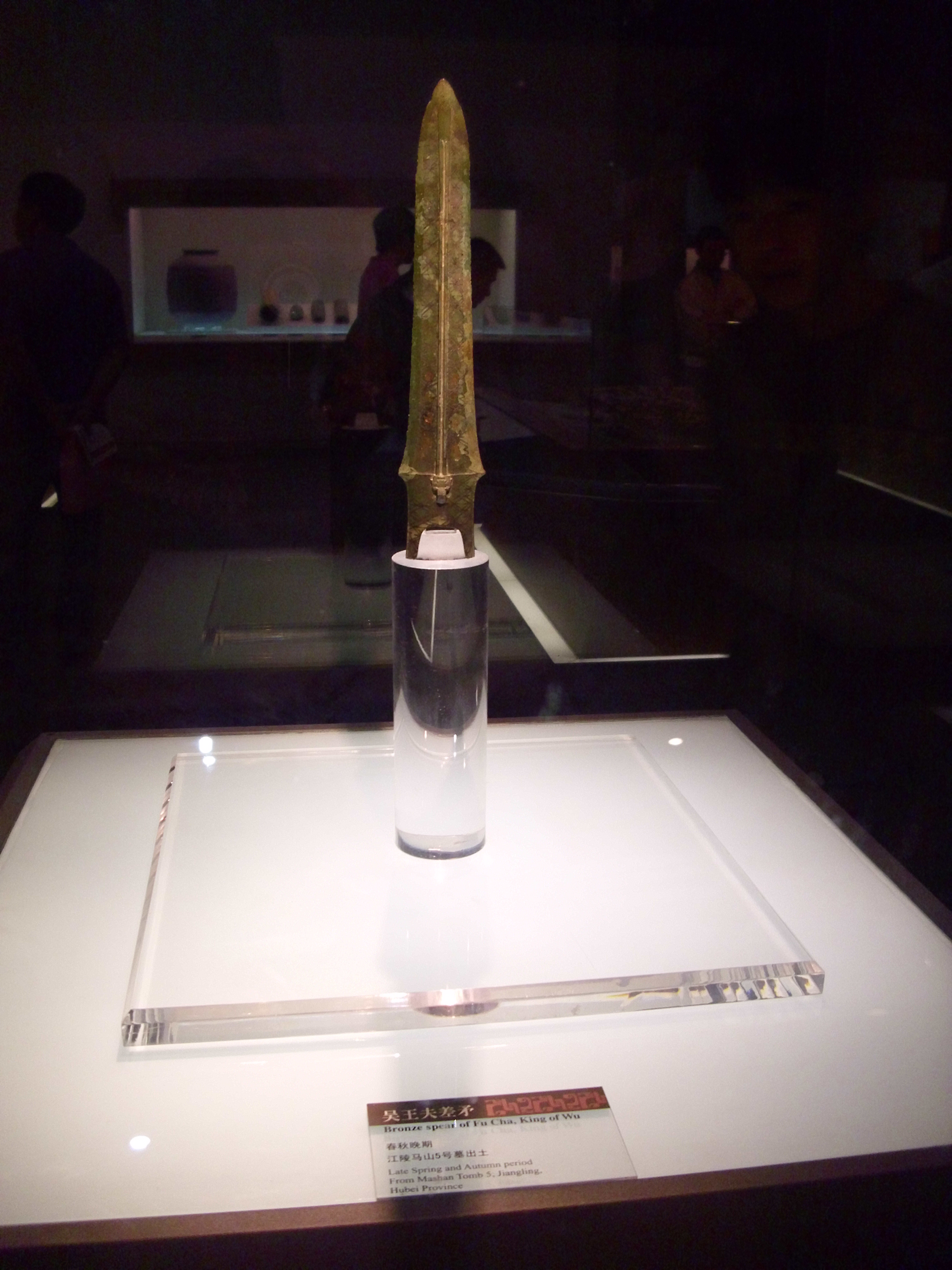
- Spear of Fuchai on display
- Material: Bronze
- Created: early 5th century BCE (Spring and Autumn period)
- Discovered: 1983 in Jiangling County
- Present location: Hubei Provincial Museum, Wuhan, Hubei, China

The Spear of Fuchai (Chinese: 吳王夫差矛; pinyin: Wú wáng fūchà máo) is the spear of King Fuchai of Wu, the archrival of King Goujian of Yue. It was unearthed in Jiangling, Hubei in November 1983. The script on it is bird-worm seal script, a variant of seal script commonly used in southern states such as Wu and Yue. The inscription mirrors the text of the Sword of Goujian, except changing the name of the owner and type of weapon. In this case, the text reads, "King Fuchai of Wu made for his personal use, this spear." (Chinese: "吴王夫差自作用矛"; pinyin: Wú wáng fūchà zì zuòyòng máo)

== In popular culture ==
A moe anthropomorphized form of the Spear along with the Sword of Goujian was featured in the 2021 Donghua Country of Rare Treasure (Nation of Treasure; 秘宝之国).

== See also ==
- Weapons and armor in Chinese mythology, legend, cultural symbology, and fiction
- Sword of Goujian
