= Ou Yezi =

Chinese swordsmith

Ou Yezi (simplified Chinese: 欧冶子; traditional Chinese: 歐冶子; pinyin: Ōu Yězǐ; Wade–Giles: Ou Yeh Tzŭ) was a legendary master of sword-making in the Spring and Autumn period. According to Yuejueshu, he forged five treasured swords for Gan Jiang and King Zhao of Chu, named, respectively, Zhanlu (湛卢), Juque (巨阙), Shengxie (胜邪), Yuchang (鱼肠) and Chunjun (纯钧). He also made three swords for King Goujian of Yue, named Longyuan (龙渊), Tai'e (泰阿) and Gongbu (工布), Hailed as The Greatest Blacksmith.

== Teacher of Gan Jiang ==
According to the Spring and Autumn Annals of Wu and Yue, Ou Yezi was the master teacher of Gan Jiang (Birrell 1993, 221-227 and 303).

== Swords made by Ou Yezi ==
- (纯钧, 纯钩, or 淳钧) Chúnjūn, Chúngōu, or Chúnjūn (Purity) - Its patterns resembled a row of stars in a constellation.
- (湛卢) Zhànlú/Pilü (Black) - A sword made from the finest of the Five Metals and imbued with the essence of Fire. Said to be sensitive to its owner's behaviour, it left of its own accord for the state of Chu when Helü's conduct offended it. When Helü became aware of King Zhao of Chu's possession of Zhanlu, he attacked Chu.
- Haocao/Panying (Bravery/Hard) - Said to have been imbued with the aspect of lawlessness and was therefore of no use to anyone. It was used as a burial object.
- (鱼肠) Yúcháng (Fish Intestines) - A short dagger said to be capable of cleaving through iron as if it were mud. Used by Helü of Wu to assassinate his uncle, Liao of Wu. It was hidden in a cooked fish presented to King Liao at a banquet. As a result of the assassination, the blade gained a reputation for causing its user to be disloyal.
- (巨阙) Jùquē (Great Destroyer) - Said to be incredibly durable, being able to withstand even hitting or stabbing rock.
- (胜邪) Shèngxié (Victor over Evil)

== Swords made with Gan Jiang ==
- (龙渊) Lóngyuān (Loong Gulf) - Its shape resembled that of a deep gulf when seen from a high mountain. Goujian used it to cut a gash in his thigh as an act of self punishment when he mistakenly executed an innocent person.
- (泰阿) Tàiē (Great Riverbank) - It had patterns like the waves of a flowing river. Tai'a was used by the king of Chu to direct his army against a Jin invasion.
- (工布) Gōngbù (Artisanal Display) - Gongbu patterns like flowing water that stop like pearls at the spine.

== See also ==
- Sword of Goujian
- Weapons and armor in Chinese mythology
