= Qingji =

5th-century BC Chinese nobleman

Qingji 慶忌
- Born: 6th century BC
- Died: 5th century BC
- Father: King Liao of Wu

Qingji
- Chinese: 慶忌
Transcriptions
Standard Mandarin
- Hanyu Pinyin: qìng jì

Qingji was a nobleman during the Spring and Autumn period. He is portrayed differently in various historical records.

== Life ==
The Zuo Zhuan records Qingji as a member of the clan of King Fuchai of Wu, often admonishing the king to change his ways of governing in order to avoid calamities for the state of Wu.

Zuo Zhuan relates that after his advice was ignored, Qingji left the capital Gusu, moved to Aidi (in today's Jiangxi province), and finally took the chance to move into the state of Chu.

According to the Spring and Autumn Annals of Wu and Yue, Qingji was the son of King Liao of Wu, and a warrior of Wu.

== Death ==
According to the Zuo Zhuan, in the winter of 475 BC, Qingji heard that the state of Yue was about to attack his homeland of Wu. He went back to Wu in order to arrange peace talks with Yue. Upon his return, he tried to eliminate Wu's disloyal advisors and obtain Yue's favour, for which he was murdered by a man from Wu.

A more well known and detailed story of his death appears in the Spring and Autumn Annals of Wu and Yue's biography of King Helü of Wu. According to this story, King Helü was threatened at the beginning of his regime by Qingji's well-known bravery, and assigned a loyalist named Yao Li to murder him. Yao Li was given a public image of a person who endured great suffering under King Helü, substantiated by some pre-planned actual suffering such as imprisonment, the murder of his family, and cutting off his arm, so that he could obtain Qingji's trust. Qingji did in fact come to trust Yao Li, and during a joint boat trip, Yao Li murdered Qingli with a spear, and then committed suicide.

== Monster by the same name ==
In the book Guanzi the same name, Qingji, is used to denote a monster having a human form four fingers high, riding a small horse. This monster is the product of lakes being dry for hundreds of years.
