= Fall of Wu =

The Fall of Wu may refer to either of

- Conquest of Wu by Yue during the Spring and Autumn period
- Conquest of Sun Wu by Jin during the Three Kingdoms period
