= Bird-worm seal script =

Type of ancient Chinese seal script

Bird-worm seal script Niao Chong script
- Inscripts of Sword of Goujian, it reads as (from upper right) Yue (State of Yue), Wang (king), Zi (self), Zuo (made)
- Script type: Logographic script
- Created: c. 771–476 BC
- Period: Spring and Autumn period, Zhou dynasty, Warring States period
- Languages: Old Chinese

Related scripts
- Parent systems: Oracle bone script: Bird-worm seal script
- Child systems: Bird seal script, Worm seal script
- Sister systems: Seal script

Bird-worm seal script
- Traditional Chinese: 鳥蟲篆
- Simplified Chinese: 鸟虫篆
- Literal meaning: bird worm seal
Transcriptions
Standard Mandarin
- Hanyu Pinyin: niǎochóngzhuàn
- Bopomofo: ㄋㄧㄠˇ ㄔㄨㄥˊ ㄓㄨㄢˋ
- Wade–Giles: niao^{3}-ch'ung^{2}-chuan^{4}
- Tongyong Pinyin: niǎochóngzhuàn
- IPA: [njàʊ.ʈʂʰʊ̌ŋ.ʈʂwân]

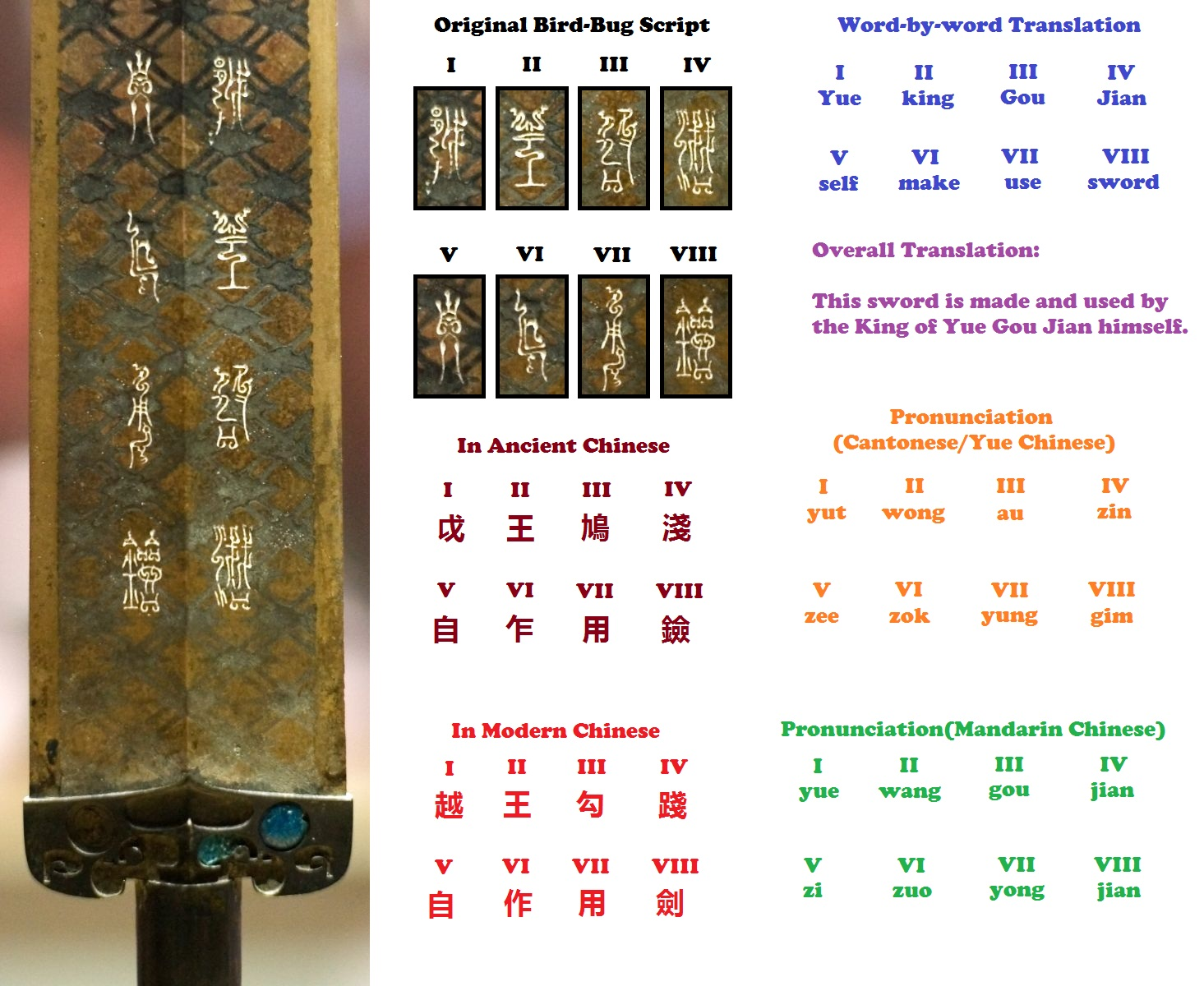
The bird seal script on the Sword of Goujian and its equivalents in modern Chinese

The bird-worm seal script (Chinese: 鳥蟲篆) is a type of ancient seal script originating in Ancient China.

== Names ==
The Chinese character 鳥 (niǎo) means "bird" and the character 蟲 (chóng) means "insect", but can also mean any creature that looks like a worm, including invertebrate worms and reptiles such as snakes and lizards (and even the Chinese dragon). The character 篆 (zhuàn) means "seal (script)".

Other names for this kind of seal script:

- Niao-chong script (Chinese: 鳥蟲書; pinyin: niǎo chóng shū). The Chinese character 書 (shū) means "script" here.
- Niao-chong characters (Chinese: 鳥蟲文; pinyin: niǎo chóng wén). The Chinese character 文 (wén) here means "script".

There are two subcategories (sub-styles):

- Bird seal script (Chinese: 鳥篆; pinyin: niǎo zhuàn; Chinese: 鳥書; pinyin: niǎo shū
  - In this style, some parts of characters have a bird-like head and tail added. The bird style sign is a combination of two parts: a complete seal script character and one (sometimes two) bird shape(s).
- Worm seal script (Chinese: 蟲篆; pinyin: chóng zhuàn; Chinese: 蟲書; pinyin: chóng shū)
  - In this style, some or all the strokes are winding, thus producing a worm-like character, but there is no additional bird shape.

== Introduction and history ==
Seal script evolved from oracle bone script, and diverged into different forms in the Spring and Autumn period, after the power of the Zhou dynasty waned and China began to divide into different states.

This kind of seal script first appeared in the middle era of the Spring and Autumn period. It then became popular during the late Spring and Autumn period, and was most popular during the Warring States period. It was often seen in kingdoms such as the Wu (roughly today's Jiangsu Province), Yue (roughly today's Zhejiang Province), Chu (roughly today's Hunan and Hubei provinces), Cai, Xu, and the Song. Each state in China during the Warring States period had its own variety of script.

These kinds of seal script declined after the Qin dynasty, most likely due to the unification of writing scripts by Qin Shi Huang (unified into the small seal script), after his unification of China, although they were used during the Han dynasty.

== Usage ==
The bird seal script is often seen on bronze and iron antiques of the Yue Kingdom (roughly today's Zhejiang Province). The script was used on bronze and iron weapons, like swords, to indicate ownership or date of completion. The characters engraved on the famous Sword of Goujian provide a fine example. A few examples of the bird seal script can be seen in or on containers and jades of that period. The bird seal script was also used occasionally in the Han dynasty seals (mainly the jade seals), as well as a few eaves tiles and bricks.

The worm seal script is more common in, and probably originated from the Wu Kingdom (now roughly Jiangsu Province) or Chu Kingdom (now roughly Hunan Province and Hubei Province). Examples can be seen on antique bronze weapons, containers, jades, and seals (mainly the bronze seals of Han dynasty), and constructional or decorative parts like tiles, etc. The characters on the famous Spear of Fuchai are a good example of this category of seal script.

== See also ==
- Bronze inscriptions
- Seal script
  - Large Seal Script
  - Small Seal Script
- Seal (East Asia)
