= Tai'e =

Tai’e (Chinese: 太阿 also written as 泰阿, Pinyin: Tài ē), is a legendary ancient Chinese sword. It is traditionally considered to be Qin Shi Huang’s sword, and in ancient Chinese culture it is a symbol of power and reign. Legend has it that the Tai'e sword was cast by Ou Yezi and Gan Jiang during the Spring and Autumn period.

The Chinese idiom "Shou Ren Yi Bing" (授人以柄) originally referred to handing the hilt of the Tai’e sword.

== Name ==
Tai (太) means "great" (interchangeable with “泰”). E (阿) refers to a hill, and by metaphorical usage means something to rely on—a support or pillar.
