= Sword of Goujian =

6th-century BC Chinese sword

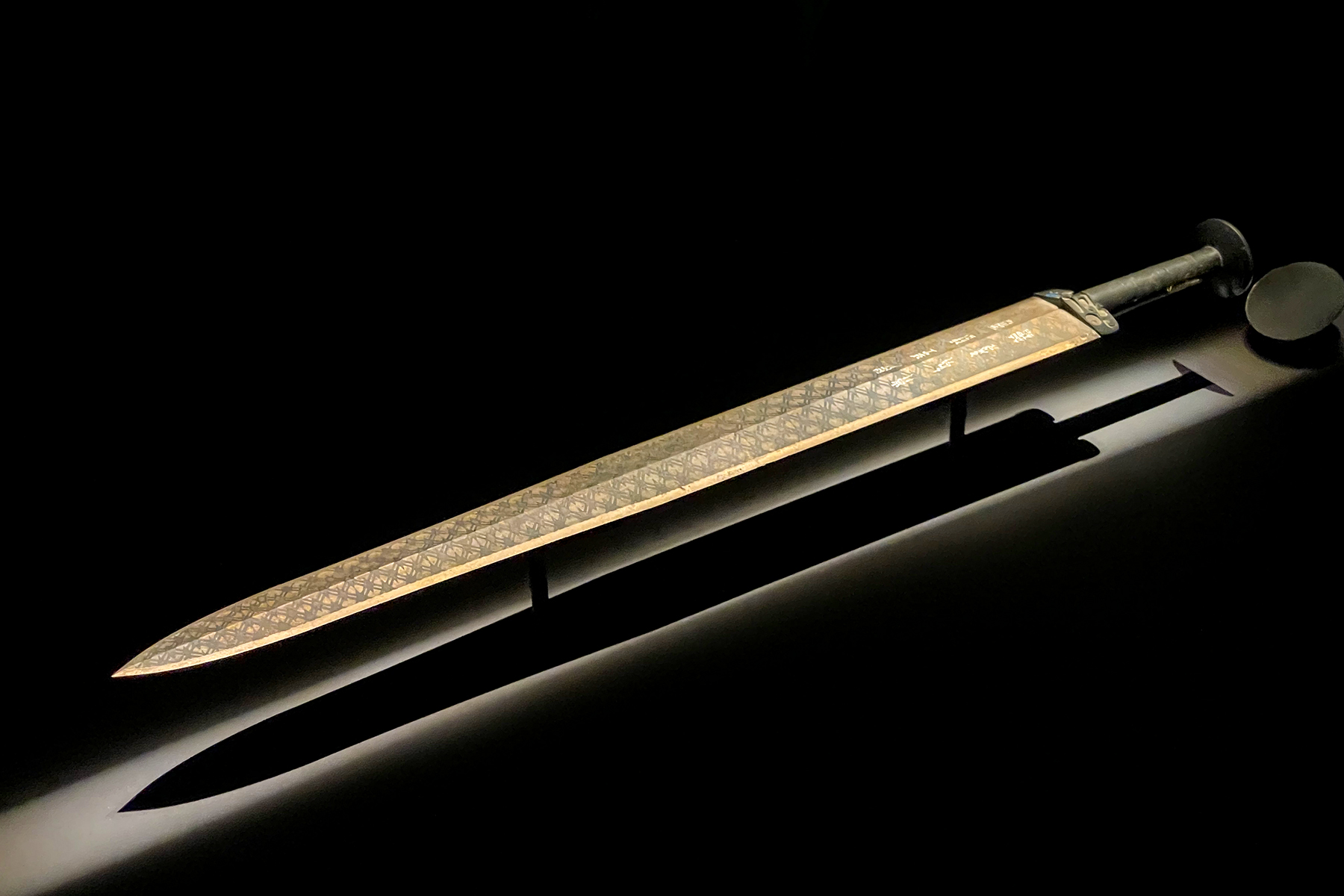
- The Sword of Goujian, Hubei Provincial Museum
- Material: Bronze
- Created: early 5th century BCE
- Discovered: 1965 in Jiangling County
- Present location: Hubei Provincial Museum, Wuhan, Hubei Province, China

The Sword of Goujian (traditional Chinese: 越王勾踐劍; simplified Chinese: 越王勾践剑; pinyin: Yuèwáng Gōujiàn jiàn) is a bronze jian renowned for its unusual sharpness, intricate design of black rhombic etchings and resistance to tarnish rarely seen in extant artifacts of a similar age. Discovered in 1965 in an ancient tomb in Hubei, the sword is identified through the inscriptions on its blade as having been made and owned by Goujian (r. 496–465 BCE), one of the last kings of Yue during the Spring and Autumn period. The sword is known as one of the earliest surviving examples of ancient Chinese sword craft that utilized complex metallurgical techniques and it is considered one of the most important objects held in the Hubei Provincial Museum.

== Discovery ==
The sword was discovered in 1965, when an archaeological survey was being performed along the second main aqueduct of the Zhang River Reservoir in Jingzhou, Hubei. Through this process, a series of ancient tombs was uncovered in Jiangling County. A dig started in the middle of October 1965, finishing in January 1966 and eventually revealed more than fifty ancient tombs of the Chu State.

More than 2,000 artifacts were recovered from the sites, including an ornate bronze sword, found inside a casket together with a human skeleton. The casket was discovered in December 1965, at Wangshan site #1, 7 kilometres (4.3 mi) from the ruins of Ying, currently called Jinancheng (纪南), an ancient capital of Chu.

The sword was found sheathed in a wooden scabbard finished in black lacquer. The scabbard had an almost air-tight fit with the sword body. Unsheathing the sword revealed an almost untarnished blade, despite the tomb being soaked in underground water for over 2,000 years.

== History ==
Swords already became an important component of royal regalia and a symbol of their right to rule since the early Zhou dynasty where King Cheng was buried with a red blade that later Han historians like Zheng Xuan believed had belonged to the last king of the Shang dynasty. The late Spring and Autumn period saw the rise of the practice of sword lore, where high quality swords were given unique names based on a particular quality of the sword such as its color, patterns, metallurgical hardness or its sharpness. This custom was particularly prominent in the states of Wu and Yue and within their royal families. Olivia Milburn has compared this to the medieval European practice of sword-naming. According to Milburn, the tales of these notable swords would later be systematically collected during the early Han dynasty and would become an important part of Chinese legend, recording down legendary swordsmiths of the period such as Gan Jiang and Mo Ye that would persist for millennia.

One of these compilations, the "Historical Texts of the Kingdom of Yue" (越絕書; Yue jue shu) reported that King Goujian had five named swords in particular that were known throughout "the subcelestial realm." Some of Goujian's named swords included "Purity" (純鈞; Chunjun) and "Refulgence" (步光; Buguang), which the king had been said to have worn when meeting Confucius for advice, and it is likely that the Sword of Goujian also had been named, though this naming has now been lost.

== Identification ==
Part of the ancient text, lit. 'The King of Yue personally made' (越王自作)

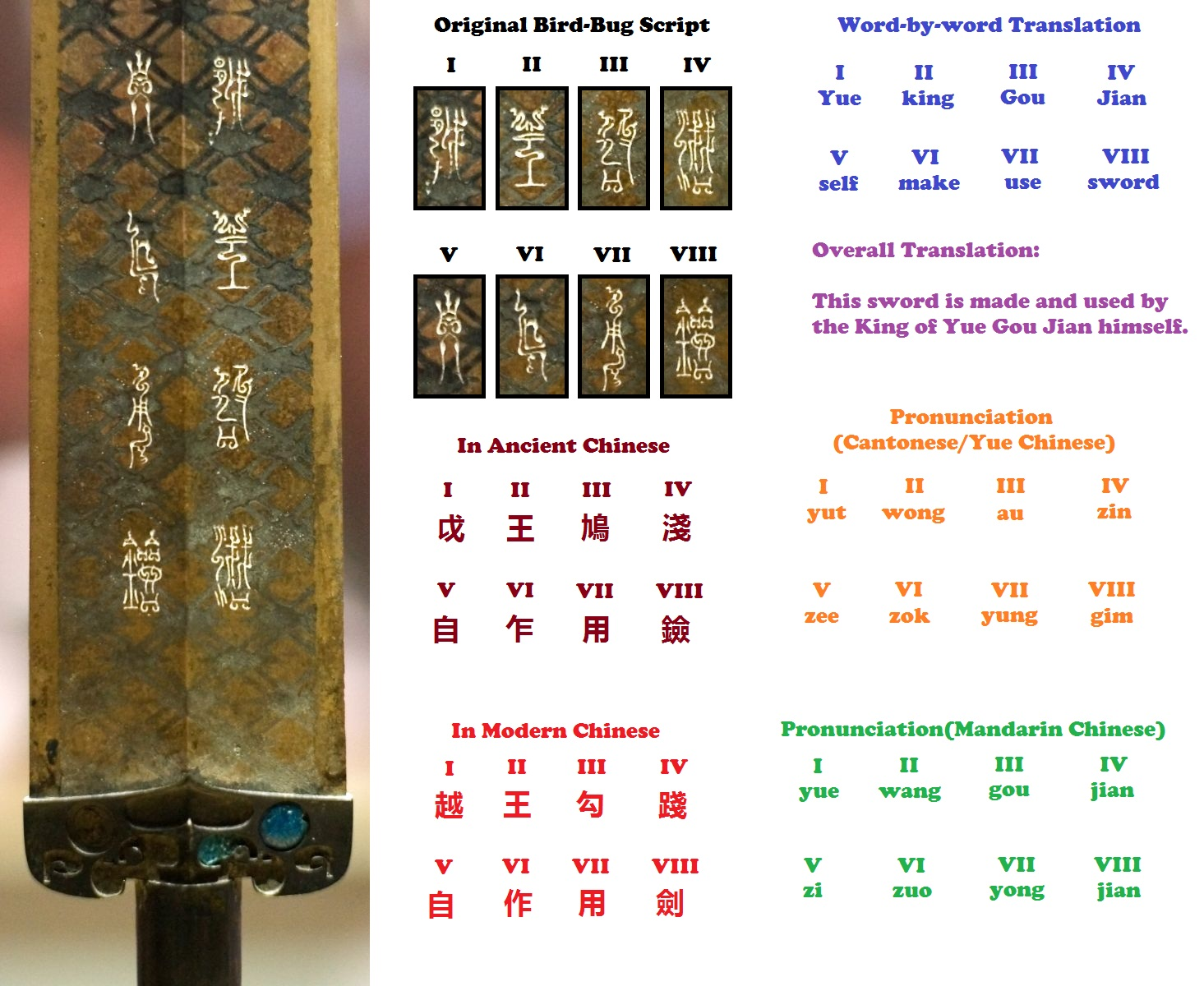
Deciphering the scripts on the Sword of Goujian

On one side of the blade near the hilt, two columns of gilded text are visible, Inlaid in gold, eight Chinese characters are written in an ancient script, now known as Bird-worm seal script (literally "birds and worms characters", owing to the intricate decorations of the defining strokes), a variant of seal script. Initial analysis of the text deciphered six of the characters, "King of Yue" (越王; Yuèwáng) and "made this sword for [his] personal use" (自作用劍; Zì zuòyòng jiàn). The remaining two characters were assumed to be the name of the particular King of Yue.

戊王鳩淺，自乍用鐱。
越王勾踐，自作用劍。
This Sword is made and used by the King of Yue himself.

From the sword's origin to the kingdom's demise at the hands of the Chu in 334 BC, nine kings ruled Yue, including Goujian, Lu Cheng, Bu Shou, and Zhu Gou. The identity of the king named in the sword inscription sparked debate among archeologists and Chinese language scholars. The discussion was carried out mostly via letter, and involved famous scholars such as Guo Moruo. After more than two months, the remaining two characters were deciphered to be the name of Goujian, the King of Yue who annexed Wu and was famously known both by his perseverance in times of hardship and his connoisseurship of fine swords.

== Construction ==
The sword of Goujian is 55.6 centimetres (21.9 in) in length, including an 8.4 centimetres (3.3 in) hilt; the blade is 4.6 centimetres (1.8 in) wide at its base. The sword weighs 875 grams (30.9 oz). In addition to the repeating dark rhombi pattern on both sides of the blade, there are decorations of blue crystals and turquoise. The grip of the sword is bound by silk, while the pommel is composed of eleven concentric circles.

=== Chemical composition ===
The Sword of Goujian still has a sharp blade and shows no signs of tarnish and it has been speculated that it is likely that the chemical composition, along with the almost air-tight scabbard, were what led to the exceptional state of preservation. To understand why, scientists at Fudan University and CAS used modern equipment to determine the chemical composition of the sword, as shown in the table below.

The sword was made from a bi-metallic alloy of copper and tin. Prior to the development of steel blades by Chu swordsmiths, high quality Bronze Age swords were considered those that successfully balanced the utilization of tin in the bronze alloy. A high tin concentration enabled hardness but also risked brittleness while a low tin concentration led to a sturdy but soft-edged blade. A significant metallurgical innovation by smiths in the states of Wu and Yue was developed to double-cast the blade, first with a low tin bronze alloy as the middle ridge for toughness and flexibility and then a high tin bronze alloy on the blade edge for hardness and strength. A bronze sword which achieves both optimal hardness and toughness was thereby simultaneously achieved. The Sword of Goujian visually embodies this metallurgical technique through the yellow-red and yellow-white coloring of the blade on the ridge and edges respectively are emblematic of the aesthetic features of this process. With compositional analysis, it was therefore confirmed that the body ridge of the blade is mainly made of copper, making it more pliant and less likely to shatter; while the edges have more tin content, making them harder and capable of retaining a sharper edge; the sulfur decreases the chance of tarnish in the patterns.

==== Amount of elements by percentage ====
Part examined	Copper	Tin	Lead	Iron	Sulfur	Arsenic
Blade	80.3	18.8	0.4	0.4	–	trace
Yellow pattern	83.1	15.2	0.8	0.8	–	trace
Dark pattern	73.9	22.8	1.4	1.8	trace	trace
Darkest regions	68.2	29.1	0.9	1.2	0.5	trace
Edge	57.3	29.6	8.7	3.4	0.9	trace
Central ridge	41.5	42.6	6.1	3.7	5.9	trace

== Damage ==
In 1994, while on loan to Singapore for display as part of a cultural exchange exhibition, a worker accidentally bumped the sword against the case, resulting in a 7-millimetre (0.28 in) crack on the sword. Since then, China has not allowed the sword to be taken out of the country, and in 2013 officially placed the sword onto the list of Chinese cultural relics forbidden to be exhibited abroad.

== In popular culture ==
A moe anthropomorphized form of the sword along with the Spear of Fuchai was featured in the 2021 donghua The Country of Rare Treasure (秘宝之国).

== See also ==
- Bell metal
- Spear of Fuchai, the spear used by Goujian's arch-rival, Fuchai of Wu
- Weapons and armor in Chinese mythology, legend, cultural symbology, and fiction
