= Yao Li =

Late 6th-century BC Chinese assassin

Yao Li (要離) was a famed ancient Chinese assassin of the state of Wu in the Spring and Autumn period.

Minister Wu Zixu recommended him to King Helü of Wu. His mission was to kill Prince Qingji, who had taken refuge in the state of Wei. To pretend to be a criminal in Wu, Yao Li killed his wife and his mother, and his right hand was cut off by King Helü. After he arrived in Wei, he met Qingji and boarded the same boat as his target. As the boat reached the middle of the river, he killed Qingji with a lance and then committed suicide.
