= Seal script =

Ancient style of Chinese characters

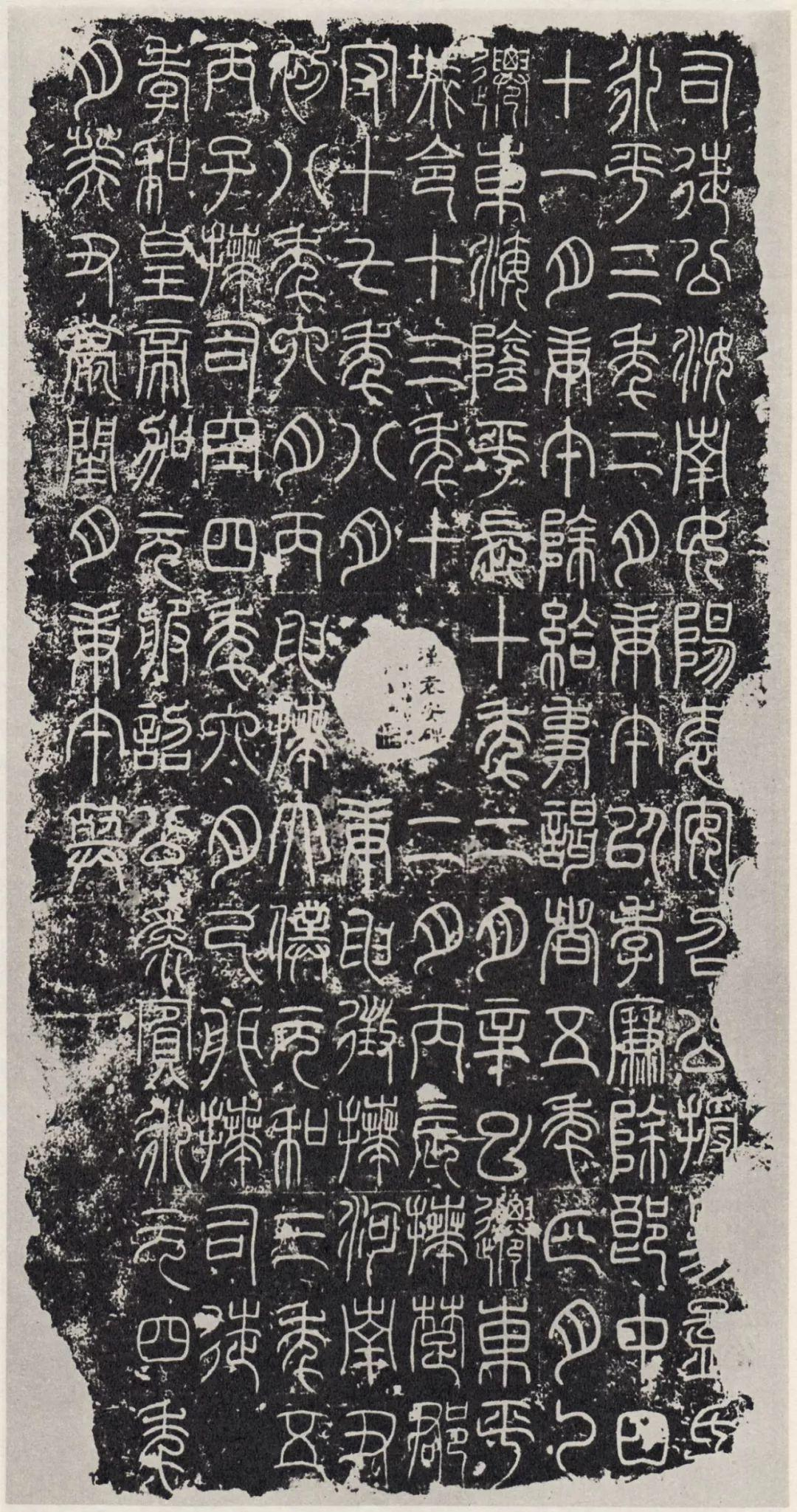
- The epitaph of Yuan An written in seal script; Yuan An was a prominent politician in the 1st century, and later the great grandfather of Yuan Shao
- Script type: Logographic
- Period: c. 700 BC – c. 200 AD
- Direction: Vertical writing
- Languages: Old Chinese

Related scripts
- Parent systems: Oracle bone script: Seal script
- Child systems: Clerical script; Regular script

Seal script
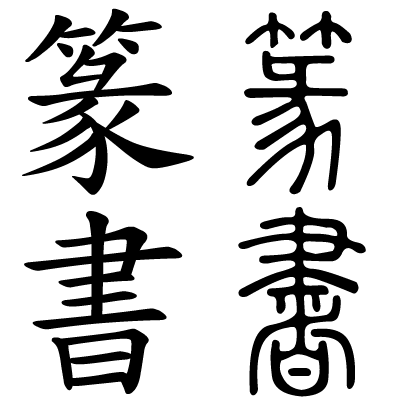
- "Seal script" in regular script (left) and seal script (right).

Chinese name
- Traditional Chinese: 篆書
- Simplified Chinese: 篆书
Transcriptions
Standard Mandarin
- Hanyu Pinyin: zhuànshū
- Bopomofo: ㄓㄨㄢˋ ㄕㄨ
- Wade–Giles: chuan^{4}-shu^{1}
- Tongyong Pinyin: jhuàn-shu
- IPA: [ʈʂwân.ʂú]
Yue: Cantonese
- Yale Romanization: syuhnsyū
- Jyutping: syun6 syu1
- IPA: [syn˨.sy˥]

Vietnamese name
- Vietnamese alphabet: triện thư; chữ triện
- Hán-Nôm: 篆書; 𡨸篆

Seal script or sigillary script (traditional Chinese: 篆書; simplified Chinese: 篆书; pinyin: Zhuànshū; lit. 'decorative engraving script') is a style of writing Chinese characters that was common throughout the latter half of the 1st millennium BC. It evolved organically out of bronze script during the Zhou dynasty (1046–256 BC). The variant of seal script used in the state of Qin eventually became comparatively standardized, and was adopted as the formal script across all of China during the Qin dynasty (221–206 BC). It was still widely used for decorative engraving and seals during the Han dynasty (202 BC – 220 AD).

The literal translation given above was coined during the Han dynasty, and reflects the role of the script being reduced to ceremonial inscriptions.

== Types ==
The term seal script may refer to several distinct varieties, including the large seal script and the small seal script. Without qualification, seal script usually refers to the small seal script—that is, the lineage which evolved within the state of Qin during the Eastern Zhou dynasty (771–221 BC), which was later standardized under Qin Shi Huang (r. 221–210 BC). The term large seal script may itself refer to a broad range of forms, including Qin forms older than the small seal script—but also earlier Western Zhou forms, or even oracle bone characters. Due to this imprecision, modern scholars tend to avoid using the term large seal script.

== Development ==
There were several different variants of seal script which developed independently in each kingdom during the Eastern Zhou. One of these, the bird-worm seal script, is named for its intricate decorations on the defining strokes, and was used in the states of Wu, Chu, and Yue. It was found on several artifacts including the Spear of Fuchai and the Sword of Goujian. As a southern state, Chu was influenced by Wuyue. Chu produced bronze broadswords that were similar to those from Wuyue, but not as intricate. Chu also used the bird-worm style, which was borrowed by the Wu and Yue states.

== Unified small seal script ==
The Qin script—as exemplified in bronze inscriptions prior to unification—had evolved organically from the Zhou script starting in the Spring and Autumn period. Beginning around the Warring States period, it became vertically elongated with a regular appearance. This was the period of maturation for the small seal script. It was systematized by prime minister Li Si during the reign of Qin Shi Huang through the elimination of most character variants, and was imposed as the imperial standard. Through Chinese commentaries, it is known that Li Si compiled the Cangjiepian, a partially-extant wordbook listing some 3,300 Chinese characters in the small seal script. Their form is characterized by being less rectangular and more squarish.

In the popular history of Chinese characters, the small seal script is traditionally considered to be ancestral to clerical script, which in turn prefigured every other script in use today. However, recent archaeological discoveries and scholarship have led some scholars to conclude that the direct ancestor of clerical script was proto-clerical script, which in turn evolved out of the lesser-known vulgar or popular writing of the late Warring States to Qin period.

The first known character dictionary was the 3rd-century BC Erya, collated and referenced by Liu Xiang and his son Liu Xin; it is no longer extant. Not long after, the Shuowen Jiezi (c. 100 AD) was written by Xu Shen. The Shuowen's 9,353 entries reproduce the standardized small seal forms for each entry, organized under 540 radicals.

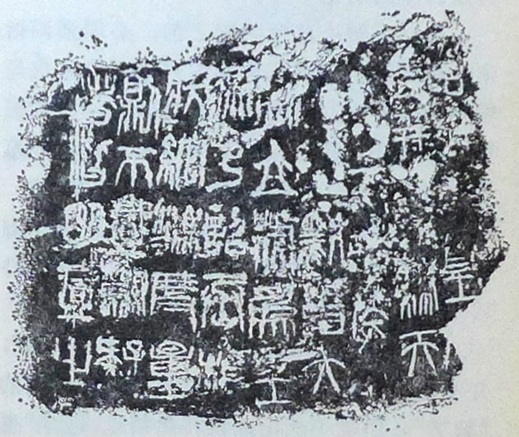
Small seal inscription on a Qin standard prototype weight—made from iron, and unearthed at Wendeng, Shandong in 1973

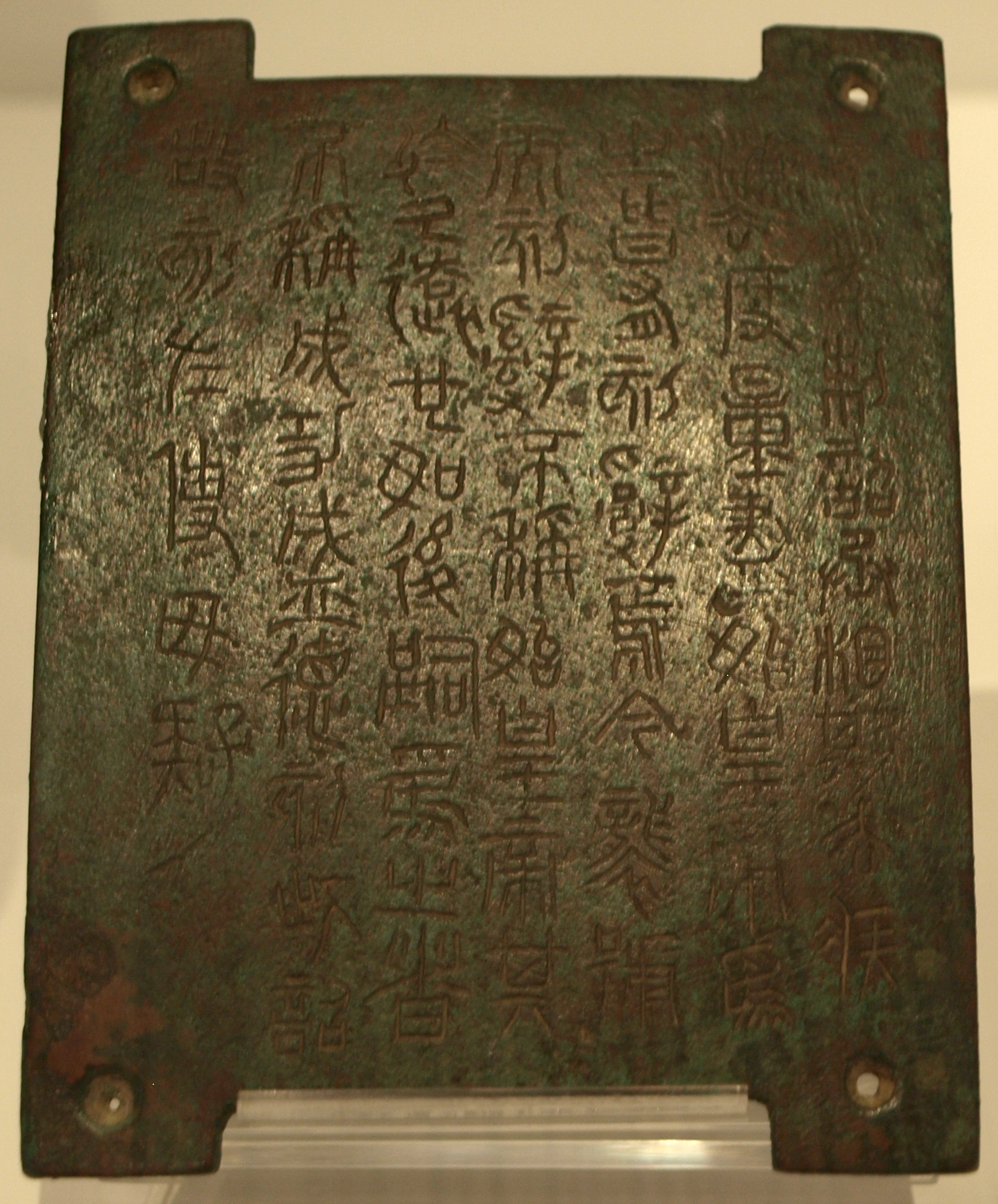
Edict of Qin Er Shi in seal script. In the popular history of Chinese characters, the small seal script is traditionally considered to be the ancestor of clerical script

== Computer encoding ==
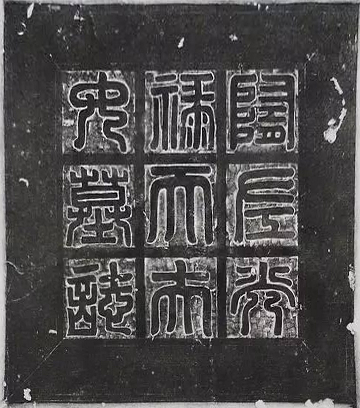
Seal inscription on the tomb of Li Jingxun (608 AD)

Seal script, including the Qin small seal script, Zhou large seal script, and Warring States variants, was accepted for Unicode version 18.0, and has been encoded at code points U+3D000 through U+3FC3F in Small Seal (Unicode block).

== See also ==
- Ancient Script Texts – School of thought in Confucianism
- ʼPhags-pa script – Mongolian writing system
- Nine-fold seal script
