= Weapons and armor in Chinese mythology, legend, cultural symbology, and fiction =

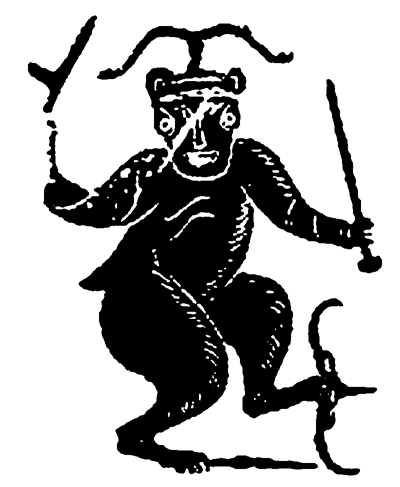
Chi You

Legendary weapons, arms, and armor are important motifs in Chinese mythology as well as Chinese legend, cultural symbology, and fiction. Weapons featured in Chinese mythology, legend, cultural symbology, and fiction include Guan Yu's guandao (featured in the 14th-century historical novel Romance of the Three Kingdoms). This non-factually documented weapon has been known as the Green Dragon Crescent Blade. Other weapons from Chinese mythology, legend, cultural symbology, and fiction include the shield and battleax of the defiant dancer Xingtian, Yi's bow and arrows, given to him by Di Jun, and the many weapons and armor of Chiyou, who is associated with the elemental power of metal. Chinese mythology, legend, cultural symbolism, and fiction feature elemental weapons, such as those evoking the powers of wind and rain, to influence battle.

== Chinese mythology ==
Chinese mythology refers to mythology that has been passed down in oral or written forms from in the geographic area now known as "China". Chinese mythology includes many varied myths from regional and cultural traditions. Chinese mythology is far from monolithic, not being an integrated system, even among just Han people. Chinese mythology is encountered in the traditions of various classes of people, geographic regions, historical periods including the present, and from various ethnic groups. China is the home of many mythological traditions, including that of Han Chinese and their Huaxia predecessors, as well as Tibetan mythology, Turkic mythology, Korean mythology, and many others. However, the study of Chinese mythology tends to focus upon material in Chinese language. Like many mythologies, Chinese mythology has in the past been believed to be, at least in part, a factual recording of history. Along with Chinese folklore, Chinese mythology forms an important part of Chinese folk religion. Many stories regarding characters and events of the distant past have a double tradition: ones which present a more historicized or euhemerized version and ones which present a more mythological version. Many myths involve the creation and cosmology of the universe and its deities and inhabitants. Some mythology involves creation myths, the origin of things, people and culture. Some involve the origin of the Chinese state. Some myths involve a culture hero who used or made and/or taught people how make or use artifacts.

== Notable users ==
=== Xingtian ===
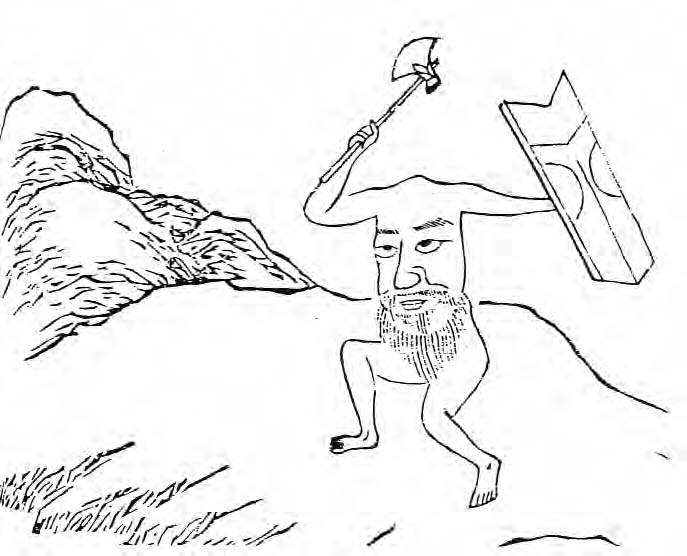
Xingtian

One of figures of classical mythology is Xingtian, a defier of Heaven and a dancing wielder of shield and weapon. Xingtian's name is also transliterated as "Hsing T'ien". Xingtian fought against the warrior-god Huangdi. Defiant to the last: even after being beheaded, Xingtian carries on, becoming immortal. This, despite having his head chopped off, and having to resort to using his nipples for eyes and his navel for a mouth. Generally, Xingtian's fighting paraphernalia is depicted as a shield and an ax.

=== Di Jun and Yi's bow and arrows ===
The great archer Yi was given a bow and arrows by Di Jun, in order to dispel the noxious presence of nine of ten over-heating suns. Some scholars identify Di Jun and Di Ku as variations from a shared original source.

=== Lü Dongbin ===
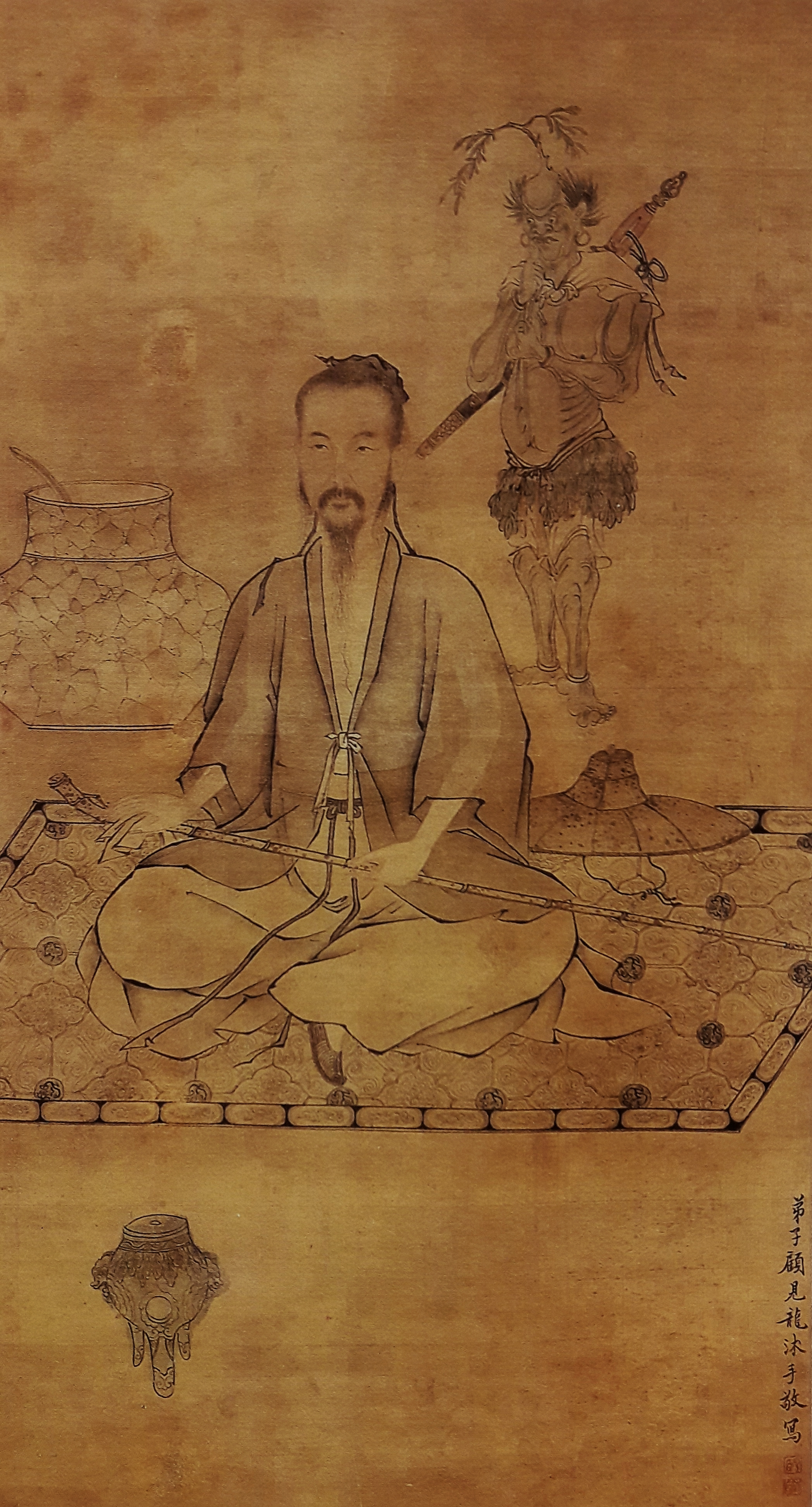
Immortal Lü Dongbin, painted by Gu Jianlong, first half of 17th century

Lü Dongbin had or has a demon-slaying sword, according to legend.

=== Guan Yu and his glaive ===
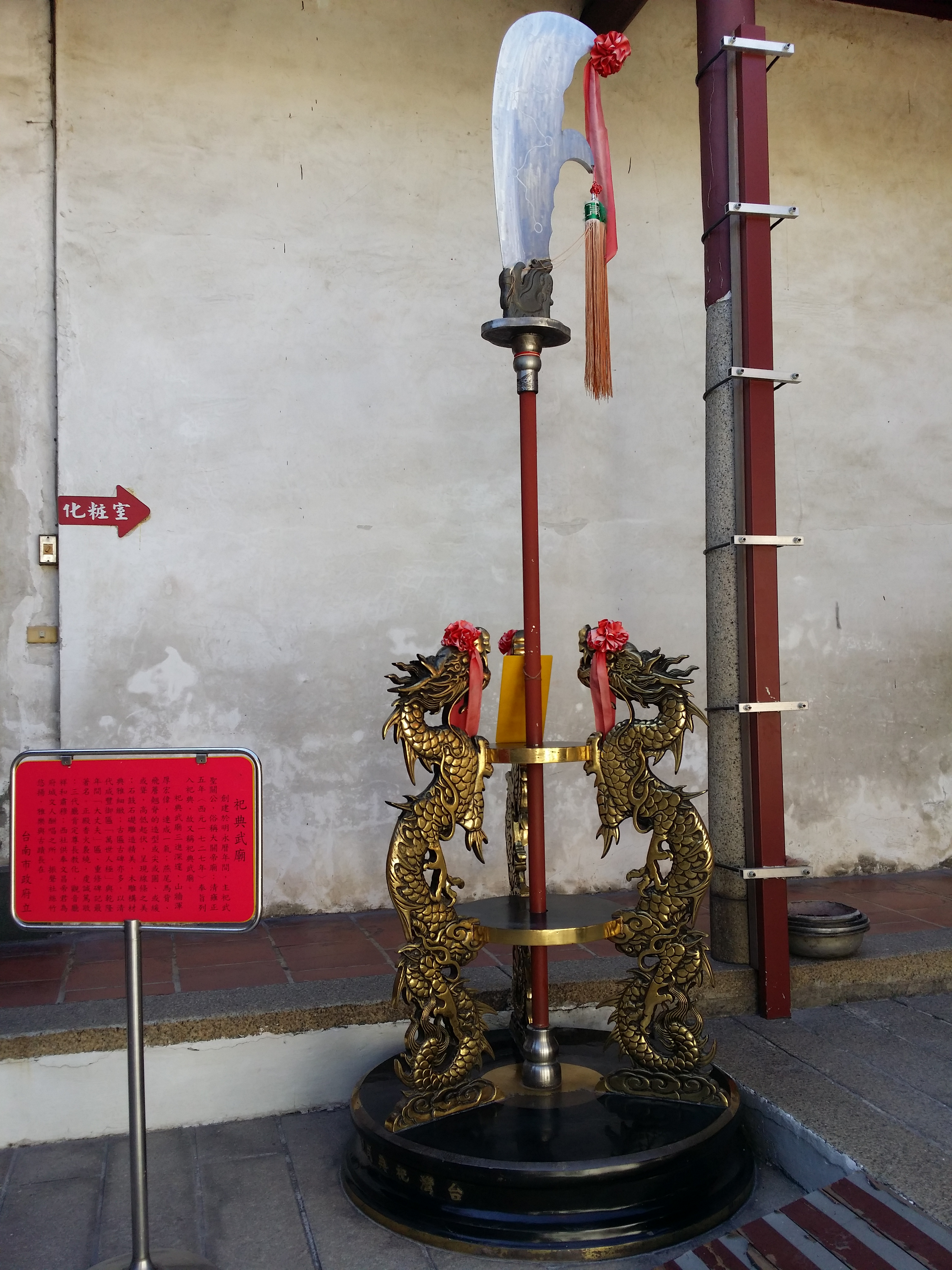
Representation of the Green Dragon Crescent Moon Blade guandao weapon of Guan Yu (who is also known as Guān Shèng Dì Jūn, "Holy Ruler Deity Guan"), in a stand in the Sacrificial Rites Martial Temple, Tainan, Taiwan

The mighty warrior, later general, and subsequently deified Guan Yu is particularly associated with his glaive weapon, known in China as a yanyuedao, "crescent moon blade", or as a guandao. Guan's blade-weapon is known as the Green Dragon Crescent Moon Sword or as the Frost Fair Blade, from the idea that during a battle in the snow, the blade continuously had blood on it; the blood froze and made a layer of frost on the blade. According to Chapter 1 of the Romance of the Three Kingdoms, the Green Dragon Crescent Blade was said to weigh 82 catties. During the Eastern Han Dynasty and Three Kingdoms periods, one catty was approximately 220 grams, so 82 catties would have been approximately 18 kilograms (~40 pounds). A weapon weighing about 100 pounds (~45 kilograms), purported to be the Green Dragon Crescent Blade, is on display at the Purple Cloud Temple in China today. Despite the weight, Guan Yu was said to have ridden alone for a thousands of miles, carrying his weapon, and to have capably wielded it one-handed, according to the somewhat mythologically-based novel Romance of the Three Kingdoms.

=== Magical weapons in Journey to the West ===
Various weapons appear in Journey to the West, some of interest as part of a mythological legacy.

==== Ruyi Jingu Bang ====
Ruyi Jingu Bang is a name for the magic staff of Sun Wukong.

==== Fly-whisks ====
Fly whisks appear as weapons of immense magical potency, especially wielded by Daoists.

== Use in notable battles ==
=== Battles of Banquan and Zhuolu ===
The early mythological battles of China were the battles of Banquan and of Zhuolu. Of the two, the conflict at Zhoulu is the more mythologically replete: both offensive and defensive weapons are described, along with countermeasures. Also, a third battle was held to have been fought between Huangdi and Yandi, as part of the series match-up.

==== Banquan ====
The Battle of Banquan (simplified Chinese: 阪泉之战; traditional Chinese: 阪泉之戰; pinyin: Bǎn Quán Zhī Zhàn) is the first battle in Chinese history is recorded by Sima Qian's in the Records of the Grand Historian, a major source of both historical and mythological material. It was fought by Huangdi, the Yellow Emperor, and Yandi, the Flame Emperor.

==== Zhoulu ====
According to the Chinese mythological account Classic of Mountains and Seas, Chiyou, various allies fought against Huangdi at the plain of Zhuolu. Both sides used magical means, but Chi You had the advantage of forged swords and halberds. Using his powers, Chiyou covered the battlefield in thick fog. The Yellow Emperor's troops found their way through the mist with the help of a magical south-pointing chariot. Huangdi used Nüba (also known as Ba or Han Ba), a drought deity, to harm Chiyou's troops by application of weather control as a weapon. Yinglong, the winged dragon, finally defeated Chiyou (Sima Qian, "Wǔdì Běnjì", Records of the Grand Historian).

===== Yandi =====
Yandi is also known as the Flame Emperor or the Red Emperor. He fought a war with Huangdi which was decided in the Battle of Banquan. The fire with which Yandi is associated seems to have been put to agricultural purposes along the lines of slash-and-burn farming techniques. In mythology, Yandi uses fire as an elemental weapon, in opposition to the use by Huangdi of water as an elemental weapon.

===== Chiyou =====
The mythological Chiyou was supposed to have invented weapons and war, Chiyou's legendary war with Huangdi included enhancing the technology to use of artificial mists and possibly the use of the compass as a countermeasure by Huangdi, and evoking the powers of wind and rain to influence battle. Chiyou is especially associated with the element of metal, using it to form arms and armor.

===== Huangdi =====
Huangdi is also known as the Yellow Emperor, Yellow Thearch, or Xuanyuan, among other names. Well known as a culture hero in Chinese culture, part of the mythology surrounding him involves his martial prowess and the use of mythological arms and apparatus of war. One example is the south-pointing chariot. Another example is the use of water as an elemental weapon.

== Made by notable smiths ==
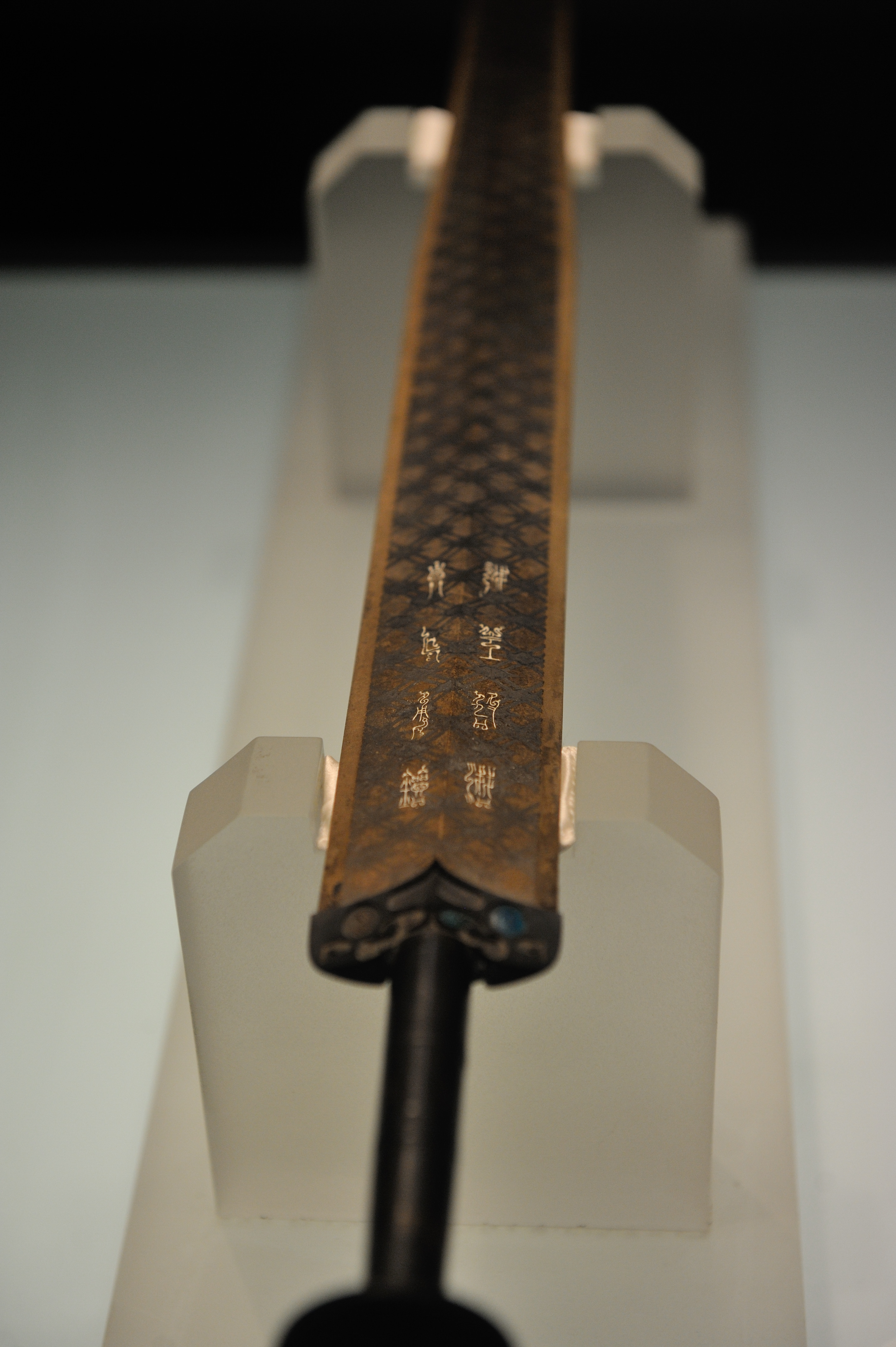
Sword of Goujian, Hubei Provincial Museum. Magical writing was often accomplished during the making of swords.

The makers and origins of weapons and armor is often mythologically important. Examples include the swords and spears originating from Wu (state), such as the sword used to slice open Gun to release his son Yu, or the legendary swords of Gan Jiang and Mo Ye. The mythological materials quoted by Birrell from various sources illustrate the dangers associated in mythology with mythological weapons, both their manufacture and their acquisition.

=== Ou Yezi ===
Ou Yezi was a famous swordsmith, according to Chinese mythology.

=== Ganjiang and Moxie ===
Also known as Kan Chiang and Mo Yeh, Gan Jiang and Mo Xie were a husband and wife pair and eponymous makers of paired swords, with Gan Jiang having studied under Master Smith Ou Yezi, according at least to the Spring and Autumn Annals of Wu and Yue. Gan-jiang was the male, Mo-xie female. They were sometimes said to have been forged from the liver and kidneys of a metal-eating hare residing in the Kunlun Mountains.

=== Famous swords of Chinese legend or mythology ===
Various famous swords may be encountered Chinese legend or mythology. Some of these swords also appear in literary fiction; or, various other media, including comics and video games. There are two main types of sword: jian and dao. Swords with estimated or presumed magical powers (or, that were especially well-made) were often designated by the epithet "treasure" (寶), as is the case with "treasure jian" (寶劍) and "treasure dao (寶刀)". Famous sword smiths documented in mythology include Ou Yezi and the husband and wife pair Gan Jiang and Mo Xie.

==== Jian ====
Jian swords have blades with two edges, longer than what would be considered to be a dagger. Translations into English are mostly provisional. In Chinese mythology, in various sources, associated with much related mythological material, various swords are said to have been forged by Gan Jiang (who studied under Ou Yezi) and Mo Xie (also transliterated as "Kan Chiang" and "Mo Yeh"), who were a husband and wife pair and eponymous makers of paired swords Gan-jiang was the male, Mo-xie female (eponymously both swords and smiths). The Gan-jiang and Mo-xie swords were sometimes said to have been forged from the liver and kidneys of a metal-eating hare residing in the Kunlun Mountains.

== Various types ==
=== Demon-slaying weapons ===
Some of the weapons most commonly wielded against demons were made of peach-wood, such as the either actually made or made according to mythology peach-wood bows actually (or mythologically) wielded to shoot down mythological, superstitiously, or religiously conceived or believed demons.

"Club" is the large stick that [Feng Meng] made of peach wood to batter Yi to death with. From that time on demons are terrified of peach-wood.

— Hsu Shen's commentary on Huai-Nan Tzu, Ch'in yen, SPPY 14.1b

== See also ==
=== General information ===
- Category:Weapons of China
- Chinese armour
- Chinese swords
- Chinese martial arts
- Chinese mythology
- Dao (sword)
- Gun (staff)
- Ji (polearm)
- Jian: general article about double-edged straight sword used during the last 2,500 years in China.
- List of Chinese wars and battles
- List of magical weapons
- Qiang (spear)

=== Other information ===
- Green Dragon Crescent Blade
- Hymn to the Fallen (Jiu Ge)
- Jiutian Xuannü
- Leigong
- Mr. He's jade
- South-pointing chariot
- Thunderbolt
- Wu xing
- Yinglong
- Xuan-Yuan Sword: a video game series.
