= You Yong =

Chinese actor

- Born: 13 December 1963 (age 62); Xi'an, Shaanxi, China
- Occupation: Actor
- Years active: 1988–present

Chinese name
Transcriptions
Standard Mandarin
- Hanyu Pinyin: Yóu Yǒng
Yue: Cantonese
- Jyutping: Jau4 Jung5

You Yong (born 13 December 1963) is a Chinese actor. He enrolled in the Xi'an Drama School (西安话剧院) in 1979 and joined the Shanghai Theatre Academy in 1984. Upon graduation in 1988, he acted in his first film, Obsession. He is best known for his roles as policemen or military officers.

== Filmography ==
=== Film ===
Year	Title	Role
1988	Obsession 瘋狂的代價	
1989	Tingyuan Shenshen 庭院深深	
1990	Peking Duck Restaurant 老店	Hua Yingkui
1991	Bell of Purity Temple 清涼寺的鐘聲	Kang Hulu
1992	Kuang 狂	Luo Desheng
1993	Rescue the Hostage 龍虎群英	Chang Shaohu
1994	Don't be Young 危情少女	
1996	Longcheng Zhengyue 龍城正月	Li Qingyang
1997	Keep Cool 有話好好說	
1999	Crash Landing 緊急迫降	Liu Yuan
1999	The House 夢幻田園	Wen Gang
2004	A World Without Thieves 天下無賊	Lao'er
2004	Breaking News 大事件	Chun
2005	Election	China police captain
2006	Election 2	
2007	Triangle	Policeman
2008	The Underdog Knight	
2008	Red Cliff 赤壁	Liu Bei
2008	Linger 蝴蝶飛	Dong's father
2009	The Founding of a Republic 建國大業	Bai Chongxi
2010	Qiangwang Zhiwang	
2010	Driverless	
2011	Under the Influence	
2014	The Crossing	
2019	Alligator Gate	
2019	Ocean Rescue	

=== Television ===
Year	Title	Role	Notes/Ref.
1988	Tanhua Meng	Cheng Cihang	
1992	Jingdu Jishi		
1992	Huangcheng Gen'er	Dali	
1995	Zhang Xueliang Jiangjun	Zhang Xueliang	
1996	Zhongguo Jizhang	Zheng Han	
1996	Peaceful of Years	Zhang Dajun	
1997	Jingtian Da Jie'an		
1998	Nanguo Da'an		
1998	Yongbu Mingmu	Li Chunqiang	
1998	Zhigao Rongyu	Meng Qiao	
1999	Zuizheng	Ding Zhaolong	
1999	Ernü Yingxiong Zhuan	Shi Heilong	
2001	Diewu Tianya (aka Lü Bu Yu Diaochan)	Zhang Li	
2001	Zhongquan Chuji	Li Zuo	
2002	The Rayal Die Hand	Dou Kaiyuan	
2002	Da Faguan	Yang Tieru	
2003	The Legend of the Condor Heroes	Ouyang Feng	
2003	Li'an Zhencha	Team leader	
2003	Cadre	Xiang Damin	
2004	Romancing Hong Kong	Su Li	
2004	Feichang Dao	Chen Xiong	
2004	Lingyun Zhuangzhi Bao Qingtian	Ye Muren	
2004	Women De Fuqin	Qin Bala	
2004	Shitian Shiye	Kong Liang	
2005	The Rebirth of a King	King Fuchai of Wu	
2005	Tiandi Liangxin		
2005	Zhaojun Chusai	Woyan Juti Chanyu	
2006	Shaolinsi Chuanqi	Yuchi Hui	
2006	Dasong Jingshi Chuanqi	Imperial Tutor Pang	
2006	The Qin Empire	Pang Juan	
2007	Xuese Meigui	Chen Ming	
2007	Red Sun	Shen Zhenxin	
2008	Dadi	Li Chungeng	
2008	Sheishi Wo Baba	Qiu Tianhong	
2008	Xin Zaixiang Hushan Xing	Jiang Tieshan	
2009	Sunzi Dazhuan	King Helü of Wu	
2009	The Sea	Wang Shankui	
2010	Yizhe Renxin	Wu Mingxun	
2011	Journey to the West	King of Baoxiang	
2012	King's War	Yong Chi	
2020	Qin Dynasty Epic	Wang Jian	
2021	Minning Town	Li Dayou	
2026	Swords Into Plowshares	Qian Yuanguan	
