= Bo Pi =

Official in the Chinese state of Wu (died 473 BC)

Bo Pi (Chinese: 伯嚭; pinyin: Bó Pǐ; Wade–Giles: Po^{2} P'i^{3}; died 473 BC) was an official in the state of Wu in the Spring and Autumn period of ancient China.

His grandfather, Bo Zhouli (伯州犁), who was an official in the state of Chu, was executed, and Bo Pi fled to Wu, where he served as an adviser to the king of Wu. During a war with the state of Yue, in which Wu had the upper hand, Bo Pi was bribed with lavish gifts from King Goujian of Yue. Bo Pi then influenced King Fuchai of Wu to make peace with the state of Yue despite objections from another advisor of King Fuchai, Wu Zixu, who warned of a possible future attack by Yue.

During Goujian's captivity in the state of Wu as a slave, he continued to bribe Bo Pi. This contributed to Goujian's return to Yue after three years. Meanwhile, the two advisers competed for the king's trust, until Bo Pi convinced Fuchai to execute Wu Zixu for treason. With Wu Zixu's death, Wu weakened as Fuchai refused to listen to good counsel. In contrast, Yue was growing stronger, with Wen Zhong and Fan Li as Goujian's advisors.

Ten years after Goujian was allowed to return to Yue, while King Fuchai waged another campaign in the state of Qi, King Goujian made a backstabbing attack on Wu. Due to years of neglect, Wu fell easily, just as Wu Zixu had warned.

In folk tales, Bo Pi was executed by King Goujian for disloyalty to the former King Fuchai and, ironically, for taking bribes from foreign rulers such as King Goujian himself.

In other records such Zuo Zhuan, it was the opposite: despite the reputation for corruption and treason, Bo Pi was still competent enough to be trusted in the new Yue government under King Goujian, even rose to the rank of Grand Administrator, and was ironically bribed by "Ji the noble" from state of Lu.
