= Xi Shi =

One of the renowned Four Beauties of ancient China

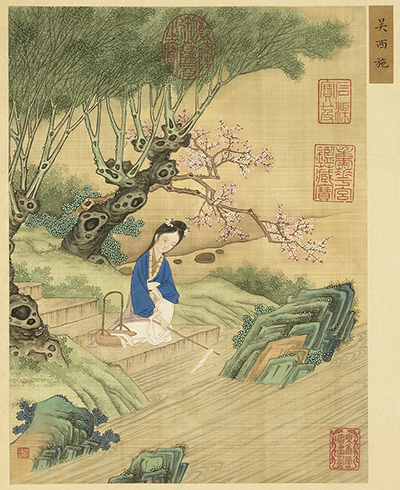
Xi Shi as depicted in the album Gathering Gems of Beauty (畫麗珠萃秀)

Xi Shi (Hsi Shih; Chinese: 西施; pinyin: Xī Shī; Wade–Giles: Hsi^{1} Shih^{1}, lit. '(Lady) Shi of the West'), also known as Xizi, sometimes named Shi Yiguang (施夷光), was one of the Four Beauties of ancient China. She was said to have lived in a small Yue village (in present-day Zhuji) toward the end of the Spring and Autumn period. Originally a local beauty known for washing silk by the Huan Sha River, she was discovered by the Yue minister Fan Li and later presented to King Fuchai of Wu as a concubine by King Goujian of Yue in a sexpionage operation, which contributed to the downfall of Wu in 473 BC. The story of Xi Shi first appeared in Spring and Autumn Annals of Wu and Yue, published five centuries after the conquest, and is absent in earlier works such as Guoyu, Zuo zhuan, and Records of the Grand Historian.

== Appearance ==
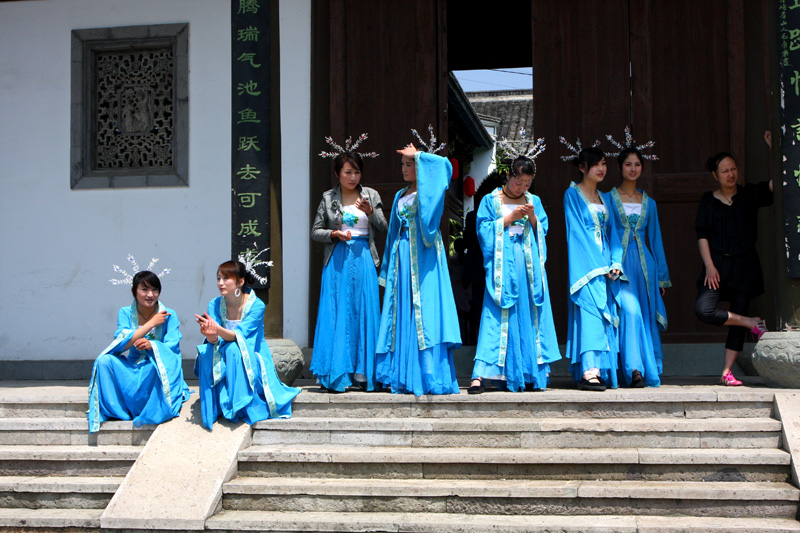
Xi Shi Hometown Tourist Area Zhuji City

Xi Shi's beauty is reputed to have been so extraordinary that, as she leaned over a balcony to observe fish in a pond, the fish were allegedly mesmerized to the extent that they momentarily ceased swimming and descended beneath the water's surface. This narrative serves as the origin of the first two characters of the Chinese idiom 沉魚落雁, 閉月羞花 (pinyin: chényú luòyàn, bìyuè xiūhuā). This idiom is commonly used to compliment a woman's beauty, symbolizing that her allure is so captivating that it can cause fish to submerge, birds to descend, the moon to hide, and flowers to blush. (Literal translation: 'fish dive, goose fall; moon hide, flower shame')

== Story of Xi Shi ==
King Goujian of Yue was once imprisoned by King Fuchai of Wu following a military defeat. As a result, the state of Yue became a tributary state to the State of Wu. In a clandestine effort to plot his revenge, King Goujian's minister Wen Zhong suggested training exceptionally beautiful women and offering them to King Fuchai as a tribute, well aware of Fuchai's weakness for beautiful women. Another minister, Fan Li, identified and procured two such women, namely Xi Shi and Zheng Dan (郑旦). After nearly three years of training, Li transformed the rural girl into a learned lady skilled in drawing, calligraphy and chess, and presented them to Fuchai in 490 BC.

Enchanted by the beauty of Xi Shi and Zheng Dan, King Fuchai became wholly preoccupied with their presence, diverting his attention from matters of state. Gradually, he began to overlook his political responsibilities and preferred to spend leisure time with Xi Shi. He often took her by carriage to the hustle and bustle of the city, where he would boast to those around him about winning the heart of the most beautiful woman in the world. Influenced by Xi Shi's counsel, he made the grievous decision to eliminate his trusted advisor, the esteemed general Wu Zixu. Furthermore, Fuchai constructed the Guanwa Palace (Palace of Beautiful Women) within an imperial park situated on the slopes of Lingyan Hill, approximately 15 kilometers (9.3 miles) west of Suzhou. In the wake of these events, the power and influence of the Wu kingdom began to wane. In the year 473 BC, King Goujian seized the opportunity to launch a decisive offensive against Wu, resulting in the complete and utter defeat of the Wu army. King Fuchai, overwhelmed with remorse for disregarding the counsel of Wu Zixu, took his own life.

In the legend, after the fall of Wu, Fan Li (范蠡) retired from his ministerial post and lived with Xi Shi on a fishing boat, roaming like fairies in the misty wilderness of Taihu Lake, and no one saw them ever again. This is according to Yuan Kang's Yue Jueshu (越绝书), which records: "After Wu died of Xi Shi, she returned to Fan Li, and went to Lake Taihu." Another version, according to Mozi, is that Xi Shi later died from drowning in the river. No matter how she died, she has been remembered for her sacrifices and for embodying ideals of loyalty, courage and selflessness for more than two millennia.

== Influence ==
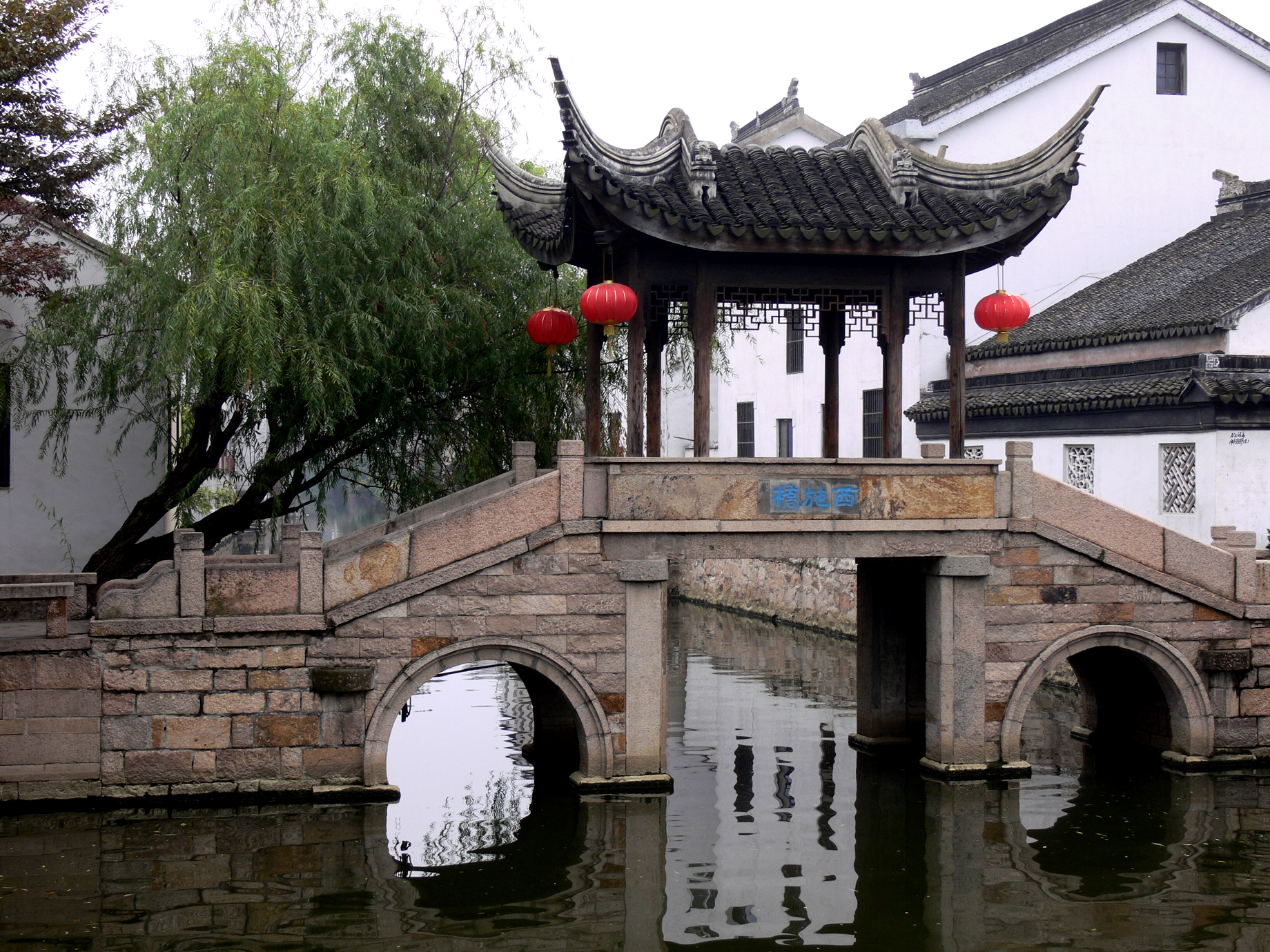
Xi Shi bridge in town of Mudu, Suzhou

The West Lake in Hangzhou is said to be the incarnation of Xi Shi, hence it is also called Xizi Lake, Xizi being another name for Xi Shi, meaning Lady Xi. In his famous poem Drinks at West Lake through Sunshine and Rain (飲湖上初睛居雨), renowned Song Dynasty poet Su Shi compared the beauty of the West Lake to that of Xi Shi.

Several Tang Dynasty poets wrote about Xi Shi and her story in their poetry, including Li Bai and Wang Wei.

Xi Shi is mentioned in the novel Journey to the West, as a sign of grace and beauty. Her story is also referenced in the novel "A Song to Drown Rivers" by Ann Liang.

Xi Shi is referenced in one of the Four Masterpieces of Chinese literature, Dream of the Red Chamber, where the heroine Lin Daiyu is described as having a delicate and frail appearance akin to that of Xi Shi. Both Lin and Xi Shi evoke the image of a beautiful lady with a delicate and fragile presence.

Xi Shi appears in the martial arts fiction by Jin Yong (Louis Cha), "Sword of the Yue Maiden".

Her name also inspired the modern name of the Shih Tzu, whose Chinese name translates to "Xi Shi dog", but whose English name has been claimed to come from the word for "lion". The moniker "lion dog" in Chinese is actually reserved for the Pekingese.

Xi Shi is referenced in the idiom 情人眼里出西施, meaning "beauty is in the eye of the beholder" (literally: "in the eyes of a lover, Xi Shi appears").

Since its introduction into literary works, the image of Xi Shi has continuously appeared and presented different colors in the writings of literati. From the initial "beauty of the world" to the "beauty disaster" in the Song Dynasty, and then to the "heroine" in the mid Ming Dynasty, the portrayal of her image carries the imprint of changes in the times and the interpretation of literati individuals.

== Xi Shi's hometown ==
Xishi Old Town, located on the south side of Zhuji City, Zhejiang Province, is an important part of the national key scenic spots of the Ruanjiang River. It is a national AAAA tourist area.

The scenic spots include the Wansa River Scenic Belt, the ancient Yue Cultural District, the Hall of Fame, the leisure resort, Fan Li Temple, Xishijeon Hall, Zheng Danjeong Pavilion, Guoyue Terrace, Feijianjeong Pavilion and Panshan Monument Gallery.

The scenic spot was named Xishi Legend's municipal heritage base in June 2006, and was named Zhejiang Intangible Cultural Heritage Tourism Scenic Area in 2010.

Although there has been controversy over the hometown of Xi Shi, on June 10, 2006, the first China Intangible Cultural Heritage Day, the State Council announced the first batch of China's intangible cultural heritage list, and the "Legend of Xi Shi" was listed. This means that the controversy over whether Xishi's hometown is Zhuji or Xiaoshan has settled over the years.
