= Wen Zhong =

Advisor and regent in the Chinese state of Yue (died 472 BC)

Wen Zhong (Chinese: 文種; pinyin: Wén Zhòng) (died 472 BC) was an advisor in the state of Yue in the Spring and Autumn period. He was a native of Ying in the State of Chu.

After Yue was defeated by the state of Wu in 494 BC, Wen Zhong bribed Bo Pi, the advisor to the leader of Wu, King Fuchai, in order to make peace. During King Goujian of Yue's captivity in Wu as a hostage, Wen Zhong governed Yue. After his release, Goujian slowly rebuilt Yue with advice from Wen and Fan Li. In the meantime, Wu began to weaken after Wu Zixu's death, as Fuchai refused to listen to good counsel. A decade after returning to Yue, Goujian started a new war with Wu, and defeated Fuchai, who committed suicide. Wu was annexed by Yue.

After the defeat of Wu, Fan Li left Goujian's services and sent Wen Zhong a letter from Qi, advising Wen Zhong to leave Goujian as well. Upon receiving the letter, Wen Zhong declined to go to court, citing an illness. After defamation by others, he was forced to commit suicide by King Goujian.
