= Spring and Autumn Annals of Wu and Yue =

History written during the Eastern Han dynasty

The Spring and Autumn Annals of Wu and Yue (Chinese: 吴越春秋; pinyin: Wúyuè Chūnqiū) is an unofficial history from the time of the Eastern Han dynasty that consists of a collection sidenotes on historical events. The ten-volume book was written by Zhao Ye (赵晔), and narrates the history of battles between the states of Wu and Yue during the Spring and Autumn period. The text is richly styled and detailed in a way that resembles texts from the School of "Minor-talks" (小說家/小说家; Xiaoshuojia) within the Hundred Schools of Thought.

The Spring and Autumn Annals of Wu and Yue is considered a follow-up of the Lost Book of Yue (越絕書). The annals have several modern commentaries and revised versions.

== Translations ==
- Olivia Milburn, The Spring and Autumn Annals of Wu and Yue: A Literary Translation of the First Chinese Novel, Wu Yue chunqiu. New York: SUNY Press, 2024. ISBN 9781438499352.

== Contents ==
- Volume 1: Biography of Taibo
- Volume 2: Biography of Shoumeng, King of Wu
- Volume 3: The story of how King Liao put Prince Guang into office
- Volume 4: Inner biography of King Helü
- Volume 5: Inner biography of King Fuchai
- Volume 6: External biography of King Wuyu of Yue
- Volume 7: External story of how King Goujian became a servant
- Volume 8: External story of how Goujian returned home
- Volume 9: External story of Goujian's schemes
- Volume 10: External story of how Goujian overcame Wu
