= Gan Jiang and Mo Ye =

Chinese swordsmith couple

Gan Jiang (Chinese: 干將; pinyin: Gān Jiāng) and Mo Ye (Chinese: 莫邪; pinyin: Mò Yé) were a swordsmith couple, discussed in the literature involving the Spring and Autumn period of Chinese history. Some aspects of this material may be considered historical; others are certainly mythological. A pair of swords was forged by and named after them.

== History ==
According to the historical text Wuyue Chunqiu, King Helü of Wu ordered Gan Jiang and Mo Ye to forge a pair of swords for him in three months. However, the blast furnace failed to melt the metal. Mo Ye suggested that there was insufficient human qi in the furnace so the couple cut their hair and nails and cast them into the furnace, while 300 children helped to blow air into the bellows. In another account, Mo Ye sacrificed herself to increase human qi by throwing herself into the furnace. The desired result was achieved after three years and the two swords were named after the couple. Gan Jiang kept the male sword, Ganjiang, for himself and presented the female sword, Moye, of the pair to the king. The king was already very displeased since he ordered the sword made in three months time but Ganjiang did not come back in three years. When the king discovered Gan Jiang had kept the male sword, he was angered and had Gan Jiang killed.

Before his death, Gan Jiang had already predicted the king's reaction, so he left behind a message for Mo Ye and their unborn son telling them where he had hidden the Ganjiang Sword. Several months later, Mo Ye gave birth to Gan Jiang's son, Chi (赤), and years later she told him his father's story. Chi was eager to avenge his father and he sought the Ganjiang Sword. At the same time, the king dreamed of a youth who desired to kill him and, in fear, he placed a bounty on the youth's head. Chi was indignant and, filled with anguish, he started crying on his way to enact his vengeance. An assassin found Chi, who told the assassin his story. The assassin then suggested that Chi surrender his head and sword, and the assassin himself will avenge Ganjiang in Chi's place. He did as told and committed suicide. The assassin was moved and decided to help Chi fulfill his quest.

The assassin severed Chi's head and brought it, along with the Ganjiang sword to the overjoyed king. The king was however uncomfortable with Chi's head staring at him, and the assassin asked the king to have Chi's head boiled, but Chi's head was still staring at the king even after 40 days without any sign of decomposition, thus the assassin told the king that he needed to take a closer look and stare back in order for the head to decompose under the power of the king. The king bent over the cauldron and the assassin seized the opportunity to decapitate him, his head falling into the cauldron alongside Chi's. The assassin then cut off his own head, which also fell into the boiling water. The flesh on the heads was boiled away such that none of the guards could recognize which head belonged to whom. The guards and vassals decided since all three should be honoured as kings (With Chi and the assassin being so brave and loyal). The three heads were eventually buried together at Yichun County, Runan, Henan, and the grave is called "Tomb of Three Kings".

== Historical records and legacy ==
Historical texts Xunzi and Mozi from the Warring States period mention the existence of the Ganjiang and Moye Swords.

The official biography of Zhang Hua in the historical text Book of Jin records that the two swords reappeared during the early Jin Dynasty. The swords were later buried at Yanping Ford (present-day Yanping District, Nanping, Fujian). A monument for the swords stands is still present in Yanping District.

Mount Mogan in Deqing County, Zhejiang, is named in memory of Gan Jiang and Mo Ye.

== In popular culture ==
In popular media, Gan Jiang and Mo Ye are referenced in:

- Fate/stay night: Their swords appear as Shirou's and Archer's signature weapons and are represented as a pair of married swords, with their names translated to Japanese: Kanshou (Ganjiang) and Bakuya (Mo Ye).
- Kingdom: The pair is referenced as having made the Bakuyu (Mo Ye) Sword. It was used by a Chu commander named Kou Yoku (Xiang Yi).
- In Wolong Fallen Dynasty, Gan Jiang and Mo Ye are one of the famous historical weapons from the Spring and Autumn period available for the protagonist to use alongside Ou Yezi's Chunjun, Zhanlu, Yuchang and Shèngxié.
- In the Yu-Gi-Oh! trading card game, the "Swordsoul" archetype of cards draw inspiration from the mythology surrounding this pair, especially the face card of the deck "Swordsoul of Mo Ye".
- The couple is portrayed as one playable Mage hero in Honor of Kings.

== See also ==
- Weapons and armor in Chinese mythology
