= Fan Li =

5th-century BC Chinese military strategist

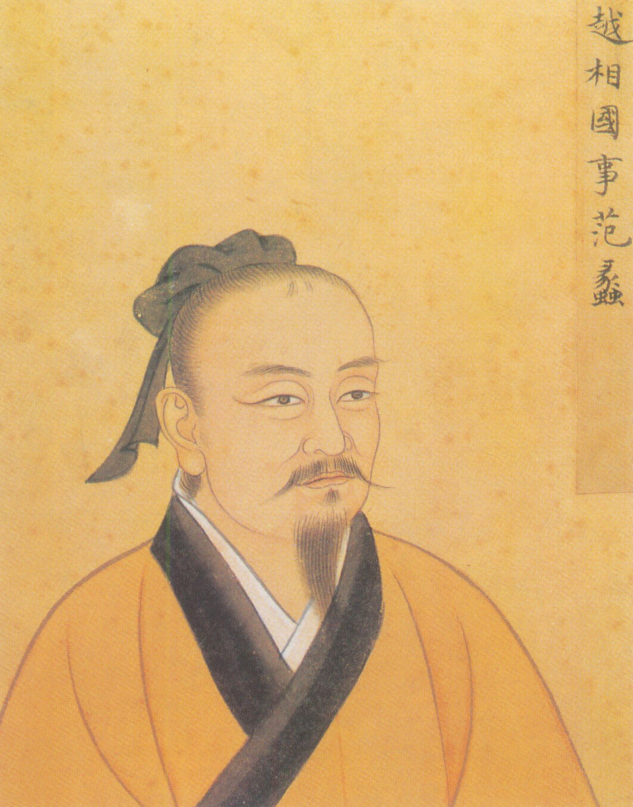
- Chinese: 范蠡
Transcriptions
Standard Mandarin
- Hanyu Pinyin: Fàn Lǐ
- Wade–Giles: Fan Li

Tao Zhugong
- Chinese: 陶朱公
- Literal meaning: Pottery-Red Lord
Transcriptions
Standard Mandarin
- Hanyu Pinyin: Táo Zhūgōng
- Wade–Giles: T'ao-chu Kung

Fan Li (fl. 5th-century BCE) was a Chinese businessman, military strategist, and politician from the Spring and Autumn period. He was an important political and military advisor to Goujian, the king of Yue. He later became known as Tao Zhugong, a name he took after achieving a decisive victory for Yue over the state of Wu and retiring to live a secluded life with his wife Xi Shi, one of the most famous beauties in Chinese history.

== Life ==
Along with King Goujian of Yue, Fan Li was once a hostage of the state of Wu. After three years of captivity the two of them returned to Yue where Fan Li helped Goujian carry out a host of reforms to streamline the administration of the Yue state. In 473 BCE, Yue was finally able to destroy the state of Wu. After the victory, Fan resigned and renamed himself Tao Zhugong. After his departure, he was said to have written a letter to Wen Zhong from Qi (now Shandong), advising Wen Zhong to leave Goujian's service. Wen took notice of the advice in the letter and later was able to escape to Qi, living his remaining days there.

Alternatively, he is said to have retired from his ministerial post and lived with Xi Shi, one of the renowned Four Beauties of ancient China, on a fishing boat roaming the misty wilderness of Lake Tai in the style of a Taoist immortal.

== Legacy ==
In his later years, he became a legend for his success in business and was posthumously worshipped as a god of money or the God of Wealth (Cai Shen). He is also credited as the namesake of Dingtao in Shandong.

Fan Li was an ancestor of Fan Zhongyan, a famous chancellor and historical figure from the Song dynasty.

Military Thought——Fan Li was highly skilled in using the "beauty trap." Having served as a hostage in the state of Wu for three years alongside King Goujian of Yue, he was acutely aware of King Fuchai's fatal weakness. Targeting King Fuchai's lustful nature, Fan Li devised and implemented the "beauty trap." Following King Goujian's instructions, Fan Li searched for beautiful women among the common people. The women chosen for this historically important task not only had to be exceptionally beautiful but also possess extraordinary courage and intelligence. After careful selection, Fan Li chose Xi Shi and Zheng Dan. Upon their first meeting, Xi Shi's beauty and innocence captivated Fan Li, while Xi Shi was instantly smitten with this young hero and dignified general. Fan Li explained the reason for the selection to Xi Shi, who, moved by his patriotic fervor, expressed her willingness to undertake this important task. Goujian personally received Xi Shi and Zheng Dan, and had them taught singing, dancing, and court etiquette. He also had people explain history, current affairs, and political strategies to them. Goujian even personally instructed Xi Shi. He entrusted them with a sacred political mission, giving them three important instructions: to indulge Fuchai in wine and women, neglecting state affairs; to encourage Fuchai to wage war abroad, depleting the state's strength; and to sow discord between Fuchai and Wu Zixu, thus eliminating his loyal minister. Three years later, Fan Li sent Xi Shi, who was well-versed in court etiquette, to the State of Wu. The lustful King of Wu was naturally delighted to see Xi Shi. Xi Shi was intelligent and quick-witted, always remembering her political mission in Wu. She used all her charm to win the King's favor and make him listen to her. Fuchai indeed showed her great favor.

== Writings ==
Fan Li's writings are lost, and only known through quotes in a compilation of works by Cai Mo (281–356). His theories on business were summarized by Ma Zong (馬摠) in the 8th–9th century, during the Tang dynasty.

His original works include:

- Several treatises attributed to him concerning business management and risks
- The Yangyu Jing (《養魚經》, Fish-Breeding Classic), an early text on fish farming.
- The Bingfa (《兵法》, Art of War), on military strategy. Not to be confused with The Art of War by Sunzi.
