= Fuchai of Wu =

King of Chinese state of Wu from 495 to 473 BC

Fuchai
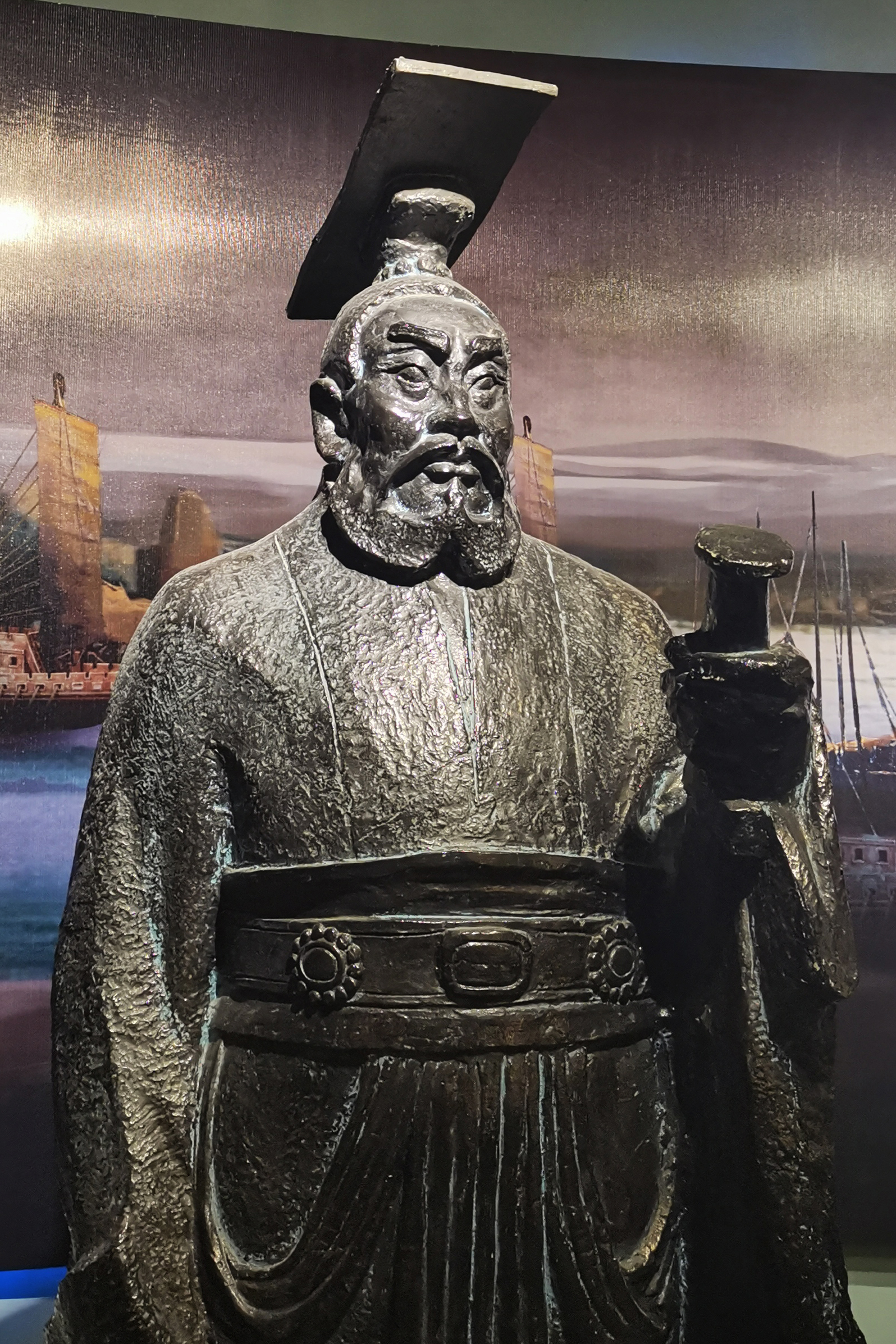
- Statue of Fuchai

King of Wu
- Reign: 495 – 473 BC
- Predecessor: Helu
- Successor: Monarchy abolished
- Died: c. 473 BC
- Issue: You; Hong; Hui; Ziyu; 1 other son
- Father: Helu

Fuchai of Wu
- Chinese: 夫差
Transcriptions
Standard Mandarin
- Hanyu Pinyin: Fuchāi; Fūchā
- Wade–Giles: Fu-ch‘ai; Fu-ch‘a

Fuchai (reigned 495–473 BC), sometimes also written Fucha, was the last king of the state of Wu during the Spring and Autumn period of Chinese history. His armies constructed important canals linking the Yellow, Ji, and Huai River systems of the North China Plain with central China's Yangtze River, but he is most remembered in Chinese culture for the role he played in the legends concerning Goujian, the revenge-seeking king of Yue.

== Life ==
Fuchai was the son of King Helü. He became king in 495 BC, following the death of his father from injuries sustained during an invasion of Yue.

In 494 BC, Goujian, the king of Yue, heard rumours that Fuchai was planning to attack him in order to avenge the death of his father. Goujian's minister Fan Li advised caution, but Goujian decided on a pre-emptive strike. Fuchai in turn, heard rumours of Goujian's plans and sent his army against Yue. The forces met at Fujiao where Wu won a complete victory, with only 5,000 Yue men surviving. These men fell back to Mount Kuaiji, with the Wu army occupying Kuaiji (now Shaoxing, Zhejiang) and then surrounding the mountain.

At Fan Li's suggestion, Goujian sent Wen Zhong to bribe the Wu chancellor, Bo Pi, in order to obtain more favourable terms. Bo accepted the gifts and promised to help Goujian's case. Because Fuchai had been more anxious to expand northward against Qi, he accepted Bo's advice to make a favourable peace with Yue rather than engage in the lengthy pacification campaign that would have been necessary to annex the state of Yue to Wu. After Fuchai withdrew his men from Yue, Goujian took his wife and Fan Li to the Wu court to serve his opponent. His hard work on Fuchai's behalf earned him the king's trust and favour, and Goujian was permitted to return to his kingdom after three years.

In 486 BC, Fuchai's men built the Hangou Canal (t 邗溝, s 邗沟, Hángōu) to connect the Yangtze River with the Huai and, via the existing Honggou Canal (t 鴻溝, s 鸿沟, Hónggōu, "Canal of the Wild Geese"), with the Yellow River beyond. This eased their supply lines during Fuchai's war with Qi, which was concluded successfully at the Battle of Ailing.

During 483 and 482 BC, Fuchai's men built the Heshui Canal (t 荷水運河, s 荷水运河, Héshuǐ Yùnhé) connecting the Si River, a tributary of the Huai, with the Ji, which ran parallel to the Yellow River through densely populated districts in what is now western Shandong.

In 482 BC, Fuchai successfully challenged the duke of Jin for the status of hegemon in the regional lords' conference in Huangchi. However, while Fuchai was away in the north with his army, Goujian advanced his army into what was now defenceless Wu. It was said that Goujian had been nursing his bitterness by sleeping on straw with a sword beside his head and by tasting gall each morning (t 臥薪嚐膽, s 卧薪尝胆, wò xīn, cháng dǎn). For ten years, he improved his realm's governance under Wen Zhong and its army under Fan Li, while personally inspiring his people by working his own fields as his wife made thread and wove it by hand. His men defeated the Wu garrisons and killed Fuchai's heir Prince You. Fuchai hurried with his army to return south and sent an emissary ahead to come to terms with Goujian, which was accepted.

Goujian had decided that he would be unable to defeat Wu in a single campaign and returned home to further strengthen his army. He also took advantage of the further weakening of Wu, as Fuchai led an extravagant and dissipated life. Following Bo Pi's advice, Fuchai executed his faithful minister Wu Zixu. King Fuchai also became completely distracted from state affairs by the Yue beauty Xi Shi, who it was said had been sent to Wu specifically for this purpose by Goujian or his ministers. However, the story of Xi Shi only appeared five centuries later, in the Spring and Autumn Annals of Wu and Yue.

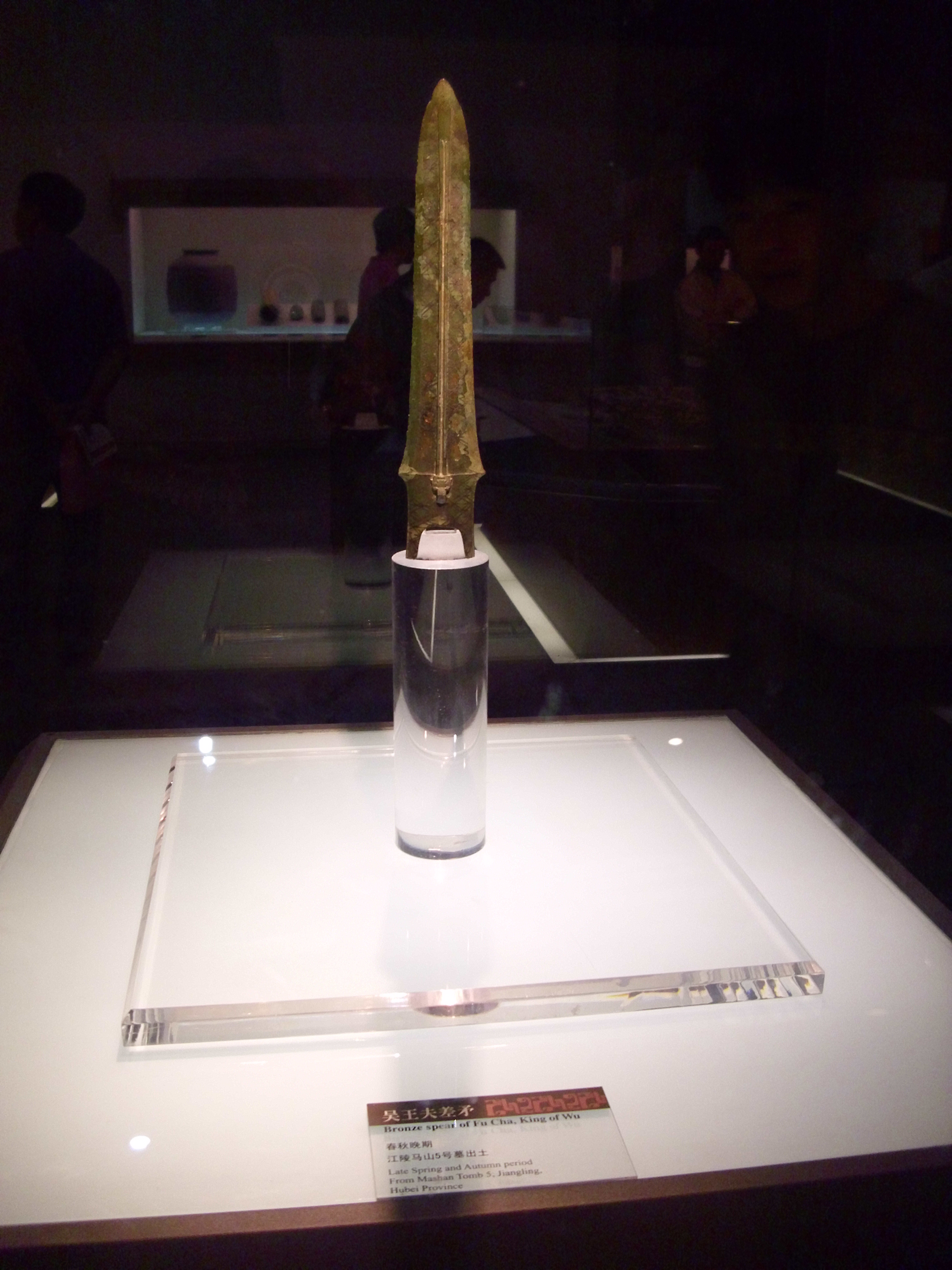
The Spear of Fuchai at the Hubei Provincial Museum

In 473 BC, Goujian's forces again attacked Wu and dealt repeated defeats on the Wu forces. Fuchai again sought terms, but Fan Li's opposition steeled Goujian's resolve. In the end, Fuchai was forced to commit suicide and Wu was annexed by Yue.

== Legacy ==
Fuchai had at least four sons, three of whom were named You, Hong and Hui. You was his heir but was killed in the battles leading to the defeat of Wu, and Hong became the new heir. After the collapse of the state, the other three sons of Fuchai were exiled. They and their descendants took Wu as their clan name. Wu Rui, King of Changsha created by Emperor Gaozu of Han, was a descendant of the House of Wu. He was said to be descended from Fuchai.

The story of Goujian's revenge became proverbial in China, as did Xi Shi's beauty. Fuchai's wronged minister Wu Zixu has been credited as the inspiration for many of the festivities around the Dragon Boat Festival.

== Family ==
Concubines:

- Xi Shi, of the Shi lineage of Yue (西施 施氏), personal name Yiguang (夷光)

Sons:

- Crown Prince You (太子友; d. 482 BC)
- Prince De (王子地)

Daughters:

- A daughter whose personal name was Ziyu (紫玉)

Fuchai of Wu House of Ji Died: 473 BC
Regnal titles
Preceded by King Helü of Wu	King of Wu; 495 BC – 473 BC	Conquered by Yue
