= Yue (state) =

1st-millennium BC state in eastern China

Yue 越
- ?–333 BC
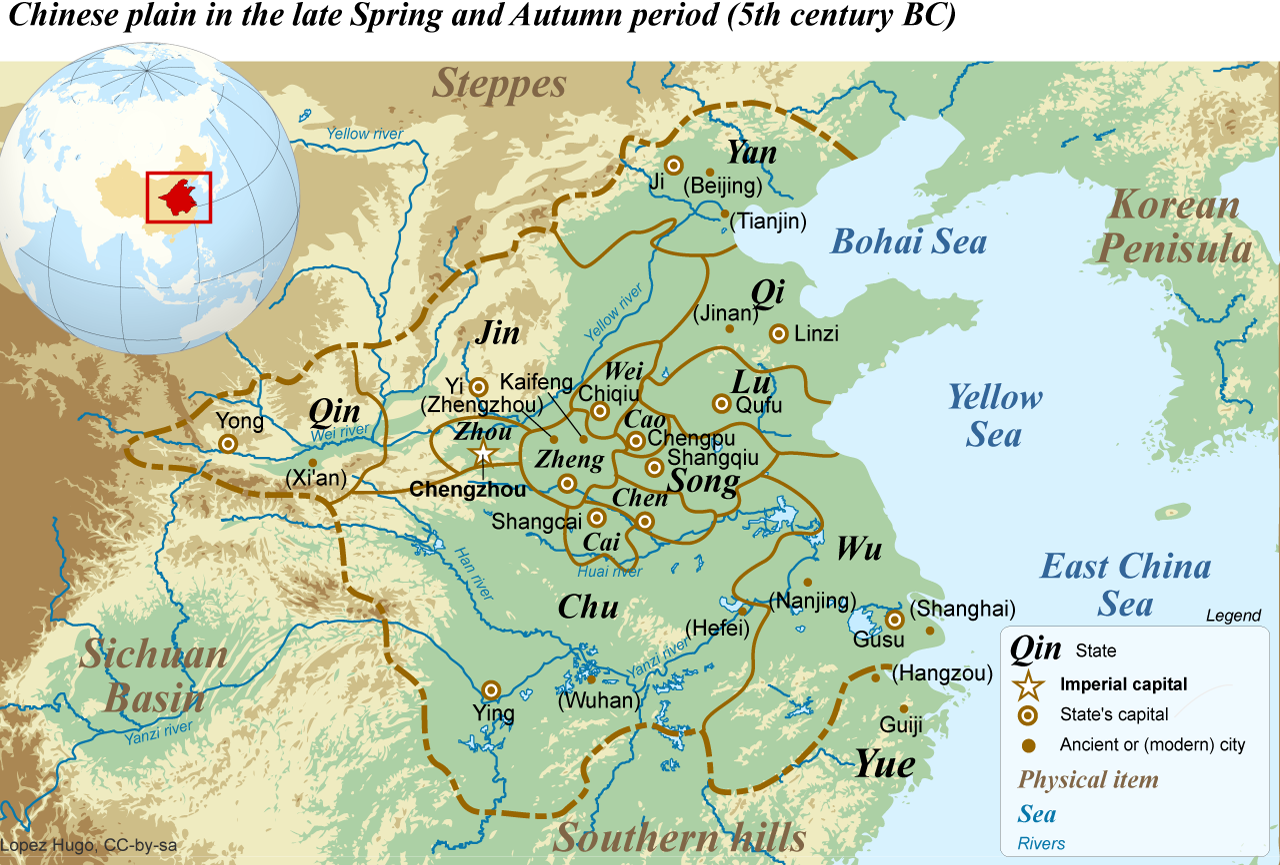
- Map of the Chinese plain in the 5th century BC. The state of Yue is located in the southeast corner.
- Status: Kingdom
- Capital: Kuaiji, later Wu
- Government: Monarchy
- King
  - 496–465 BC: Goujian
- Historical era: Spring and Autumn period Warring States period
  - Established: ?
  - Conquered by Chu: 333 BC
Succeeded by
Minyue; Chu

Yue
- "Yue" in seal script (top) and modern (bottom) Chinese characters
- Chinese: 越
Transcriptions
Standard Mandarin
- Hanyu Pinyin: Yuè
- Gwoyeu Romatzyh: Yueh
- Wade–Giles: Yüeh^{4}
- IPA: [ɥê]
Wu
- Suzhounese: Yuq^{8}
Yue: Cantonese
- Yale Romanization: Yuht
- Jyutping: Jyut^{6}
- IPA: [jyt̚˨]
Southern Min
- Tâi-lô: Ua̍t
Old Chinese
- Baxter (1992): *wjat
- Baxter–Sagart (2014): *[ɢ]ʷat

Yue (Chinese: 越), also known as Yuyue (於越 or 于越), was a state in ancient China which existed during the first millennium BC – the Spring and Autumn and Warring States periods of China's Zhou dynasty – in the modern provinces of Zhejiang, Shanghai and Jiangsu. Its original capital was Kuaiji (modern Shaoxing); after its conquest of Wu, Yue relocated its court north to the city of Wu (modern-day Suzhou). Yue's territory extended north to Lake Tai, west to Quzhou, and southeast to the Xianxia Mountains, the Dapan Mountains, and the Tiantai Mountains. Yue was conquered by Chu in 333 BC.

== History ==
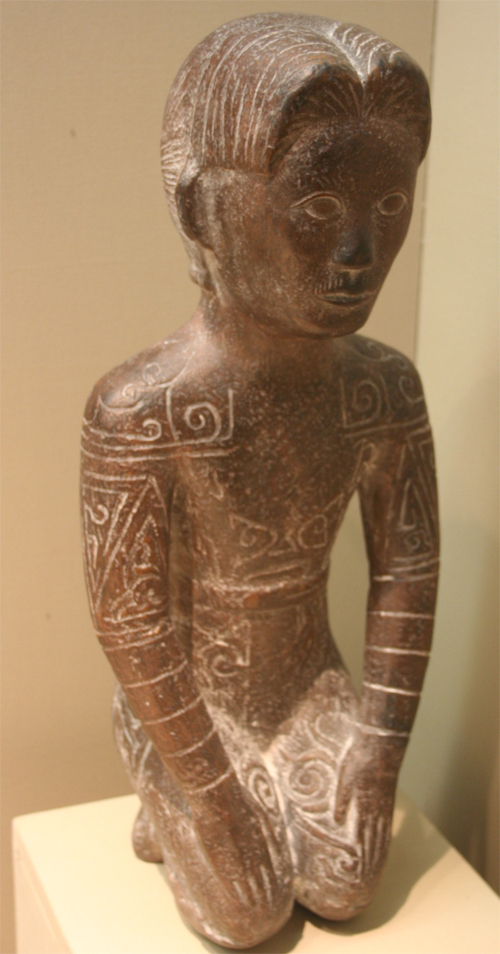
A statue of a man, dating from the State of Yue era

A specific kingdom, which had been known as the "Yue Guo" (越國) in modern Zhejiang, was not mentioned until it began a series of wars against its northern neighbor Wu during the late 6th century BC. According to the Records of the Grand Historian and Discourses of the States, the Yue are descended from Wuyu, the son of Shao Kang, the sixth king of the Xia dynasty.

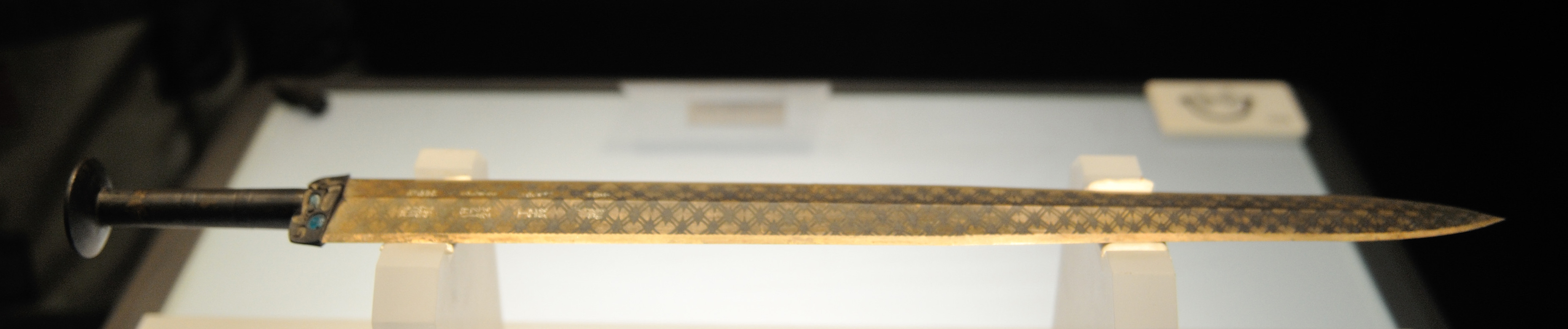
The bronze sword of the Yue king Goujian, 771 to 403 BC

With help from Wu's enemy Chu, Yue won after several decades of conflict. The famous Yue King Goujian destroyed and annexed Wu in 473 BC. Yue then inherited Wu's good relations with Jin, and the two became allies. In 441 BC, Jin and Yue invaded Qi, whereupon Qi erected the Long Wall to prevent Yue attacks from southern Shandong.

Yue reached their apex in 404 BC, when they, along with their ally of Jin, invaded Qi and Lu. Qi and Lu made peace with Yue, with Qi ceding territory and allowing Yue to march triumphantly through the Lu capital. The Marquis of Lu drove King Yi's carriage, with the Marquis of Qi accompanying him.

During the reign of Wuqiang (無彊), six generations after Goujian, Yue was partitioned by Chu and Qi in 333 BC.

Yue was famous for the quality of its metalworking, particularly its swords. Examples include the extremely well-preserved Swords of Goujian and Zhougou.

The Yue state appears to have been a largely indigenous political development in the lower Yangtze. This region corresponds with that of the old corded-ware Neolithic, and it continued to be one that shared a number of practices, such as tooth extraction, pile building, and cliff burial. Austronesian speakers also still lived in the region down to its conquest and sinification beginning about 240 BC.

What set the Yue apart from other Sinitic states of the time was their possession of a navy. Yue culture was distinct in its practice of naming boats and swords. A Chinese text described the Yue as a people who used boats as their carriages and oars as their horses.

== Rulers of Yue family tree ==
Their ancestral name is rendered variously as either Si (姒) or Luo (雒 or 駱).

Rulers of Yue family tree

^{(1)} Marquis Wuyu of Yue 越侯無餘
^{(2)} Marquis Wuren of Yue 越侯無壬
^{(3)} Marquis Wushen of Yue 越侯無瞫
^{(4)} Marquis Futan of Yue 越侯夫譚 (r. 565─538 BC)
^{(5)} Marquis Yunchang of Yue 越侯允常 (d. 497 BC)
^{(6)} King Goujian of Yue 越王句踐 (496─465 BC)
^{(7)} King Luying of Yue 越王鹿郢 (465─459 BC)
^{(8)} King Bushou of Yue 越王不壽 (459─449 BC)
^{(9)} King Weng of Yue 越王翁 (449─412 BC)
^{(10)} King Yi of Yue 越王翳 (412─376 BC)
^{(11)} King Zhihou of Yue 越王之侯 (376─375 BC)
^{(12)} King Chuwuyu of Yue 越王初無余 (375─365 BC)
^{(13)} King Wuzhuan of Yue 越王無顓 (365─357 BC)
^{(14)} King Wuqiang of Yue 越王無彊 (357─333 BC)

== Aftermath ==
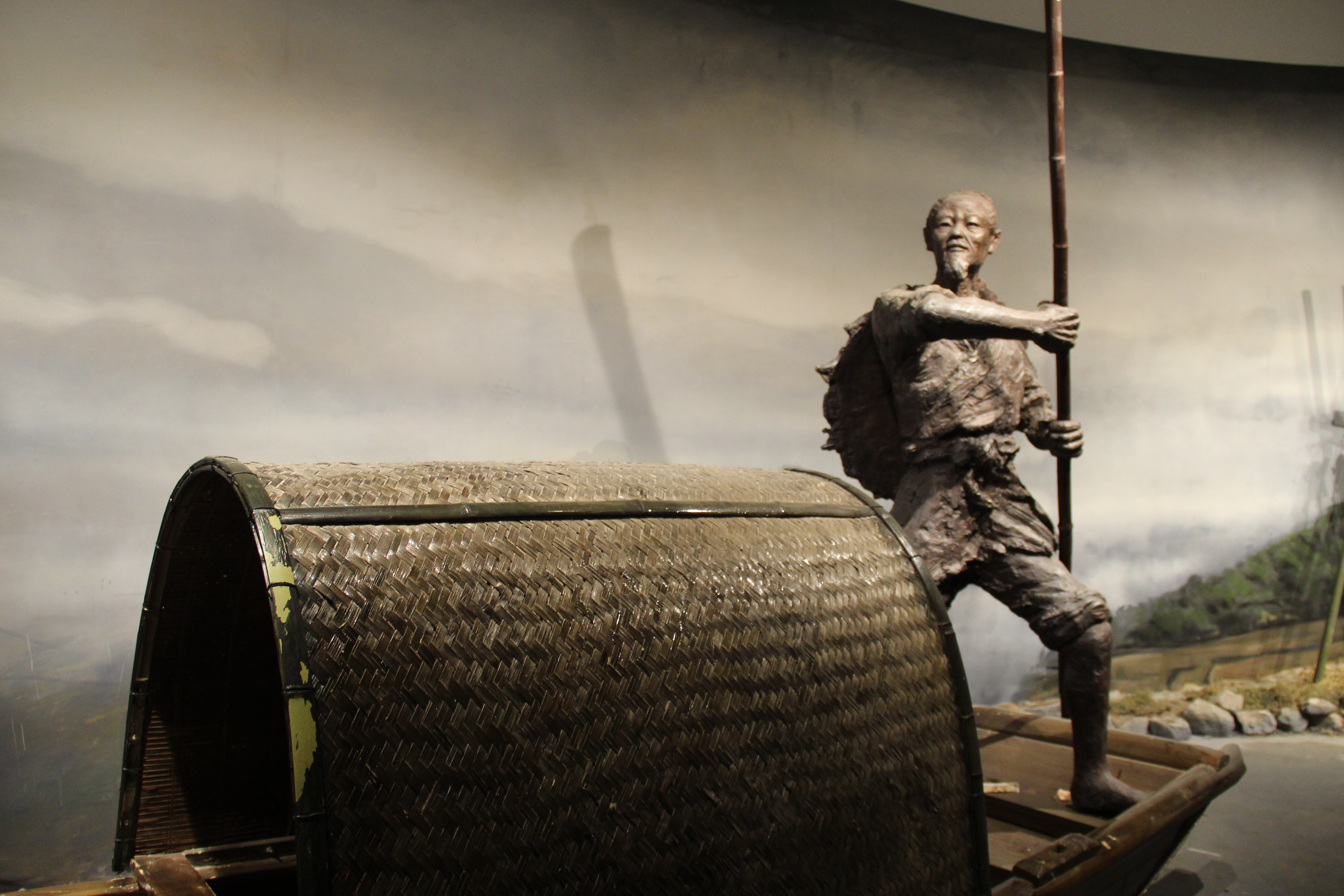
Yue period small boat (diorama)

After the fall of Yue, the ruling family moved south to what is now southern Zhejiang and Fujian and set up the Dong'ou kingdom and Minyue kingdom. These successor states lasted until around 150 BC, then they were annexed by Han dynasty.

Mingdi, Wujiang's second son, was appointed minister of Wucheng (present-day Huzhou's Wuxing District) by the king of Chu. He was titled Marquis of Ouyang Ting, from a pavilion on the south side of Ouyu Mountain. The first Qin dynasty emperor Qin Shi Huang abolished the title after his conquest of Chu in 223 BC, but descendants and subjects of its former rulers took up the surnames Ou, Ouyang, and Ouhou (歐侯) in remembrance.

When the religious leader Xu Chang launched a rebellion against the Han dynasty in 172 CE, he declared the state of Yue restored and appointed his father Xu Sheng as "King of Yue". The rebels were crushed in 174.

== Astronomy ==
In Chinese astronomy, there are two stars named for Yue:

- Yue (along with Wu) is represented by the star Zeta Aquilae in the "Left Wall" of the Heavenly Market enclosure.
- Yue is also represented by the star Psi Capricorni or 19 Capricorni in the "Twelve States" of the mansion of the Girl.

== Biology ==
The virus genus Yuyuevirus and the virus family Yueviridae are both named after the state.

== People from Yue ==
- Yuenü, swordswoman and author of the earliest-known exposition on swordplay
- Xi Shi, a famous beauty of the ancient Yue Guo.

== Language ==
Possible languages spoken in the state of Yue may have been of Tai-Kadai and Austronesian origins. 126 Tai-Kadai cognates have been identified in Maqiao Wu dialect spoken in the suburbs of Shanghai out of more than a thousand lexical items surveyed. According to the author, these cognates are likely traces of 'old Yue language' (古越語; Gǔyuèyǔ).

== See also ==
- Tai languages
- Tai-Kadai languages
- Austronesian languages
- Austro-Tai languages
- Tai peoples
- Austronesian peoples
- Austro-Tai peoples
- Baiyue
- Minyue
- Wu (state)
- Dong'ou Kingdom
- Âu Việt
- Lạc Việt

== Sources ==
- de Crespigny, Rafe (2016). Fire over Luoyang: A History of the Later Han Dynasty 23–220 AD. Leiden, Boston: Brill. ISBN 9789004324916.
- Holm, David (2014). "A Layer of Old Chinese Readings in the Traditional Zhuang Script". Bulletin of the Museum of Far Eastern Antiquities: 1–45.
- Kiernan, Ben (2017), Việt Nam: A History from Earliest Times to the Present, Oxford University Press, ISBN 978-0-195-16076-5.
- Li, Hui (2001). "Daic Background Vocabulary in Shanghai Maqiao Dialect" (PDF). Proceedings for Conference of Minority Cultures in Hainan and Taiwan, Haikou: Research Society for Chinese National History: 15–26. Archived from the original (PDF) on 2018-03-27.
