= Piandao =

Chinese curved sword

The piandao (片刀) is a type of Chinese sabre (dao) used during the late Ming dynasty and through the Qing dynasty. A curved dao meant for slashing and draw-cutting, it bore a strong resemblance to the Persian shamshir. A fairly uncommon weapon, it was generally used by skirmishers in conjunction with a shield.

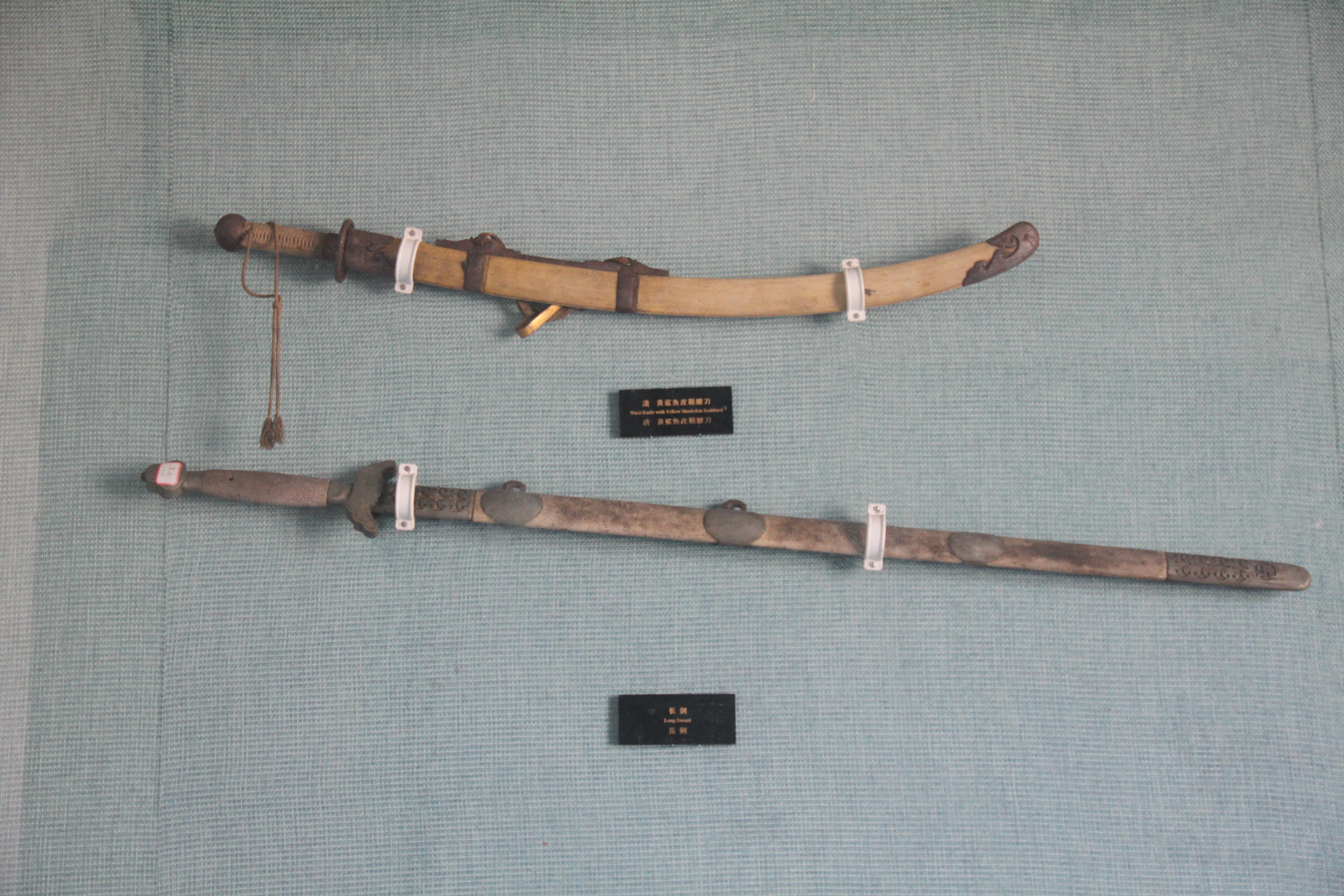
Two antique Qing swords: The top sabre scabbard shows curvature suggesting a piandao. A Jian below

== See also ==
- Dao (sword)
- Dadao
- Oxtail Dao
- Yanmaodao
- Liuyedao
