= Yanmaodao =

Chinese military sword

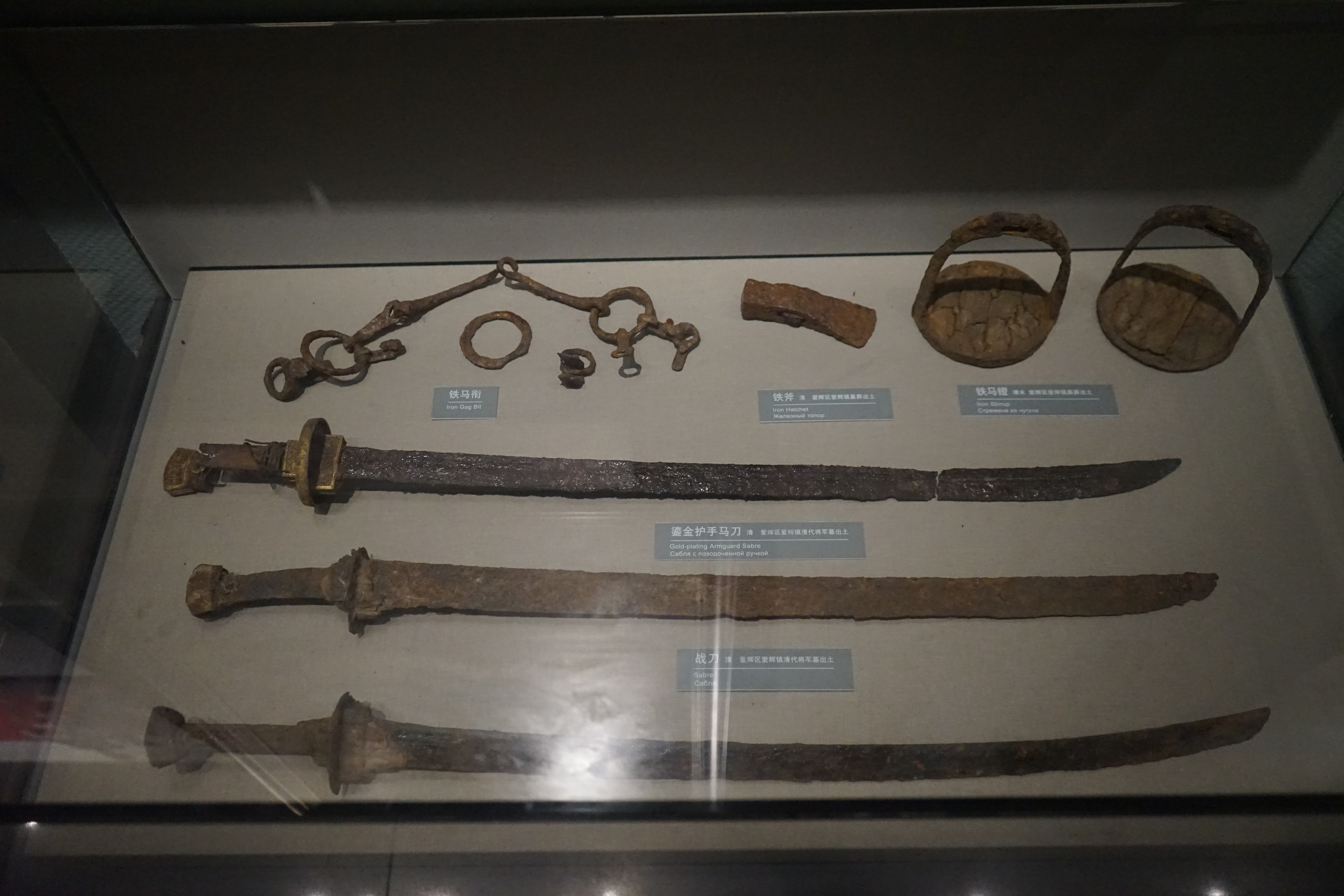
Qing dynasty peidao (Chinese: 佩刀; lit. 'waist-worn saber') of slightly different shapes, but primarily straight. Modern collectors would tend to classify these blades as yanmaodao/yanlingdao.

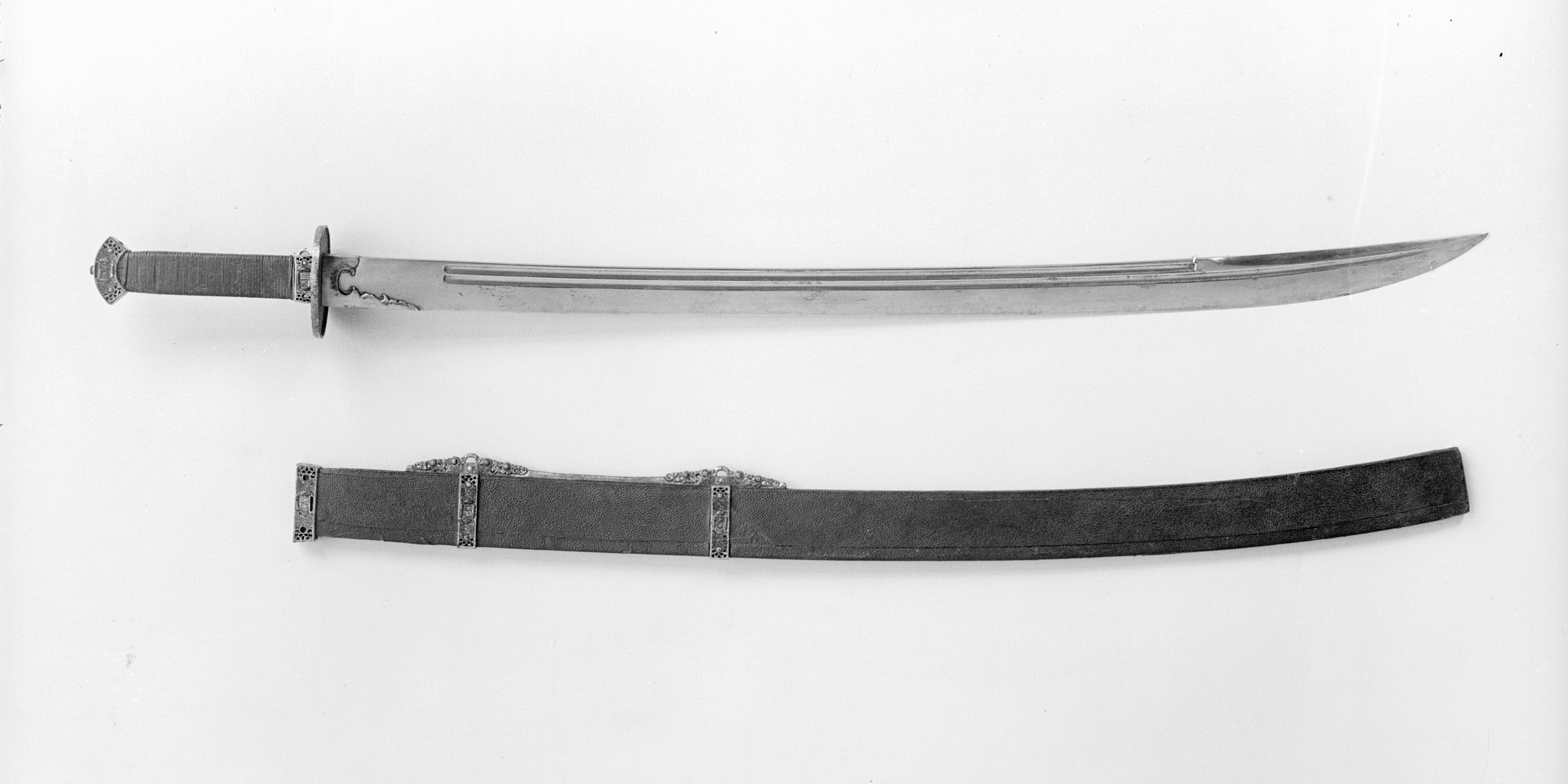
A liuyedao from the 17th to 18th century (Note: Controversial. The shape of this blade is relatively straight, and the tip is curved, more like a yanmaodao.)

The yanlingdao (Chinese: 雁翎刀; lit. 'goose-quill saber') or yanmaodao (Chinese: 雁毛刀; lit. 'goose-fur saber') is a type of dao used as a standard military weapon during the Ming dynasty and middle Qing dynasty (1368–1800). The blade is straight until the curve begins around the center of percussion along the last 1/4 or so of the blade approaching the tip. The center of percussion is the point on the blade with the least vibration on hard contact, the spot on the blade that transmits the most power to the target in a hard chop. This allows for thrusting attacks and overall handling similar to that of the jian, while still preserving much of the dao's strengths in cutting and slashing. This type of sword seems to have lost its popularity with military and martial arts practitioners alike by the end of the 18th century, being eclipsed by the more curved liuyedao in the military, and the more broad Oxtail Dao in civilian and martial art settings.

Yanmaodao almost invariably have straight grips, although downward-curved handles are depicted in Ming artwork. During the last century of Qing rule, curved grips became far more prevalent than straight.

== Terminology ==
Yanmaodao is a modern term, which appears to have been coined by antique collectors to help classify this distinct shape of military sabre blade. It does not appear to have been used in classical texts.

Yanlingdao (雁翎刀) or "goose-feather sabre" is another term used at least since the Song dynasty, which is at times use interchangeably with yanmaodao. No period depictions of yanlingdao exist, so it remains unclear if this was an entirely different type of sabre, or just another name for the same type of sword.

== See also ==
- Chinese swords
- liuyedao
- oxtail dao
- dadao
- piandao

== Notes and references ==
- Tom, Philip with Scott M. Rodell (February 2005). "An Introduction to Chinese Single-Edged Hilt Weapons (Dao) and Their Use in the Ming and Qing Dynasties". Kung Fu Tai Chi, pp. 76–85
