= Otachi =

Otachi may refer to:

- Otachi, another name for the generation II Pokémon also called Sentret
- Otachi, a Kaiju from the film Pacific Rim

== See also ==
- Ōdachi
