= Changdao (disambiguation) =

The changdao is a type of Chinese sword.

Changdao may also refer to:

- Changdao County, Shandong, China
- Changdao Town, Xihe County, Gansu, China
- Li County, Gansu, China, known as Changdao during the Tang dynasty
