= Zhanmadao =

Single-bladed anti-cavalry Chinese sword

Zhanmadao (斬馬刀)
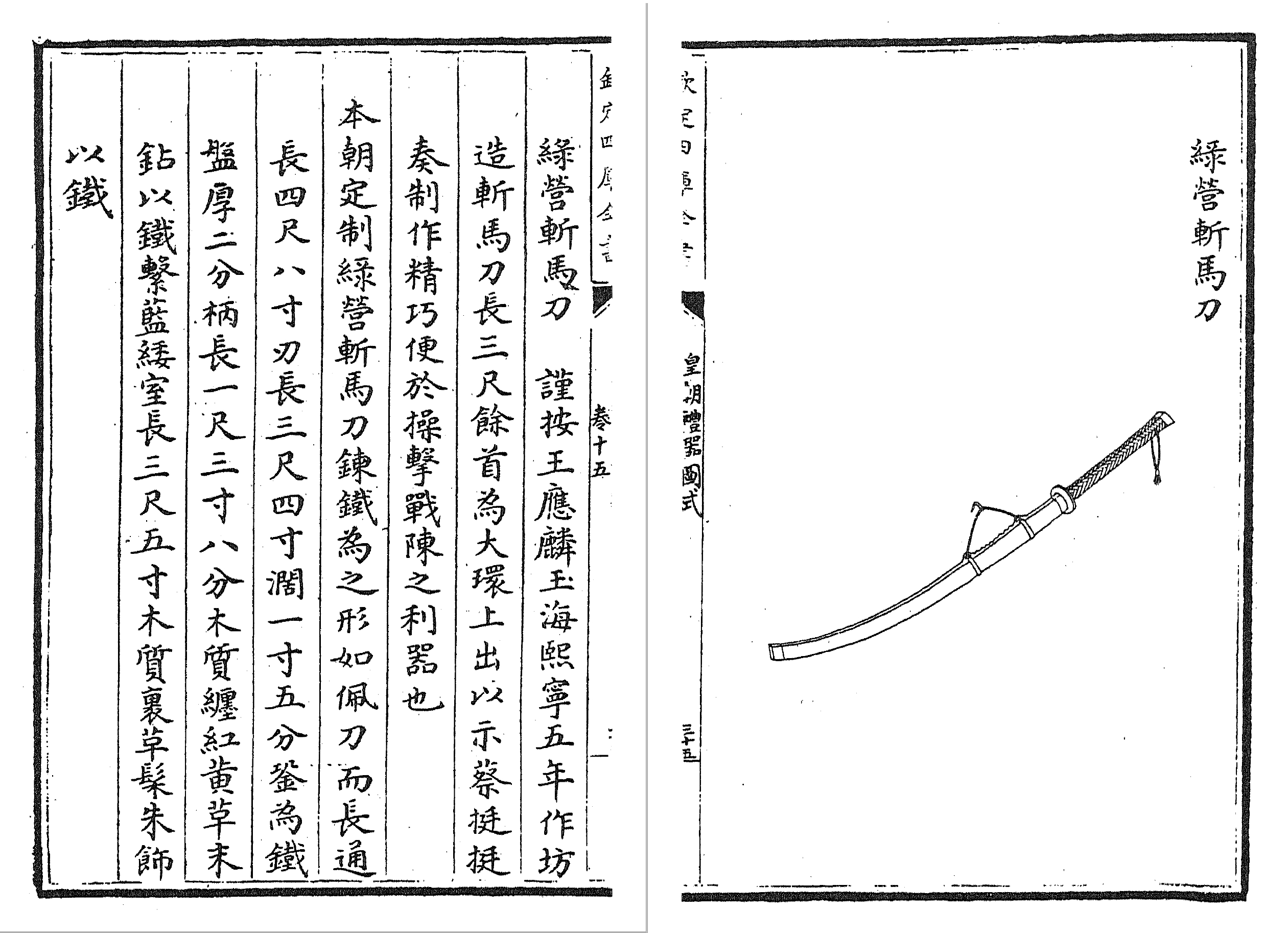
- A zhanmadao "horse butchering dao" from a Qing dynasty illustration, 1766
- Type: Infantry anti-cavalry saber
- Place of origin: Han dynasty, China

Production history
- Variants: Possible changdao, miaodao, wodao, zanbatō

Specifications
- Length: Approx 200–300 cm (79–118 in)
- Blade length: Approx 150–200 cm (59–79 in)
- Blade type: Single edged, straight for most of the length, curving in the last third.
- Hilt type: Two handed

The zhanmadao (Chinese: 斬馬刀; pinyin: zhǎnmǎdāo; Jyutping: zaam2 maa5 dou1; lit. 'horse chopping 'sabre'/'dao'/'single-edged blade'') was a single-bladed anti-cavalry Chinese sword. It originated during the Han dynasty (206 BC – 220 AD) and was especially common in Song China (960–1279).

== History ==
The earliest variant of the zhanmadao is called zhanmajian (Chinese: 斬馬劍; pinyin: zhǎnmǎjiàn), literally "horse beheading jian". The zhanmajian existed during the Han dynasty, so called because it was supposedly able to cut off a horse's head. The difference between the two is that zhanmajian is double-edged whereas the zhanmadao is single-edged, which persists with the meaning of jian and dao. Another suggestion is that the zhanmajian was an execution tool used on special occasions rather than a military weapon.

== General characteristics ==
The zhanmadao is a single-edged sabre with a long broad blade, and a long handle suitable for two-handed use. It was used as an anti-cavalry weapon, dating from Emperor Cheng of Han, made to slice through a horse's legs. This is mentioned in the Wujing Zongyao, a Song military manual from 1072. It featured prominently against the Jin armies in campaigns between 1129 and 1141.

Surviving examples include a sword that might resemble a nagamaki in construction; it had a wrapped handle 37 cm (15 in) long making it easy to grip with two hands with a blade that was 114 cm (45 in) long and straight, with a slight curve in the last half.

== Similar weapons ==
Possible variations of these Chinese swords were the changdao of Tang dynasty and Ming dynasty, wodao of Qing dynasty, as well as miaodao of the Republican Era.

== See also ==
- Dao (Chinese sword)
- Changdao
- Messer (sword)
- Ōdachi
- Zweihänder
