= Ōdachi =

Japanese sword

Ōdachi (大太刀)
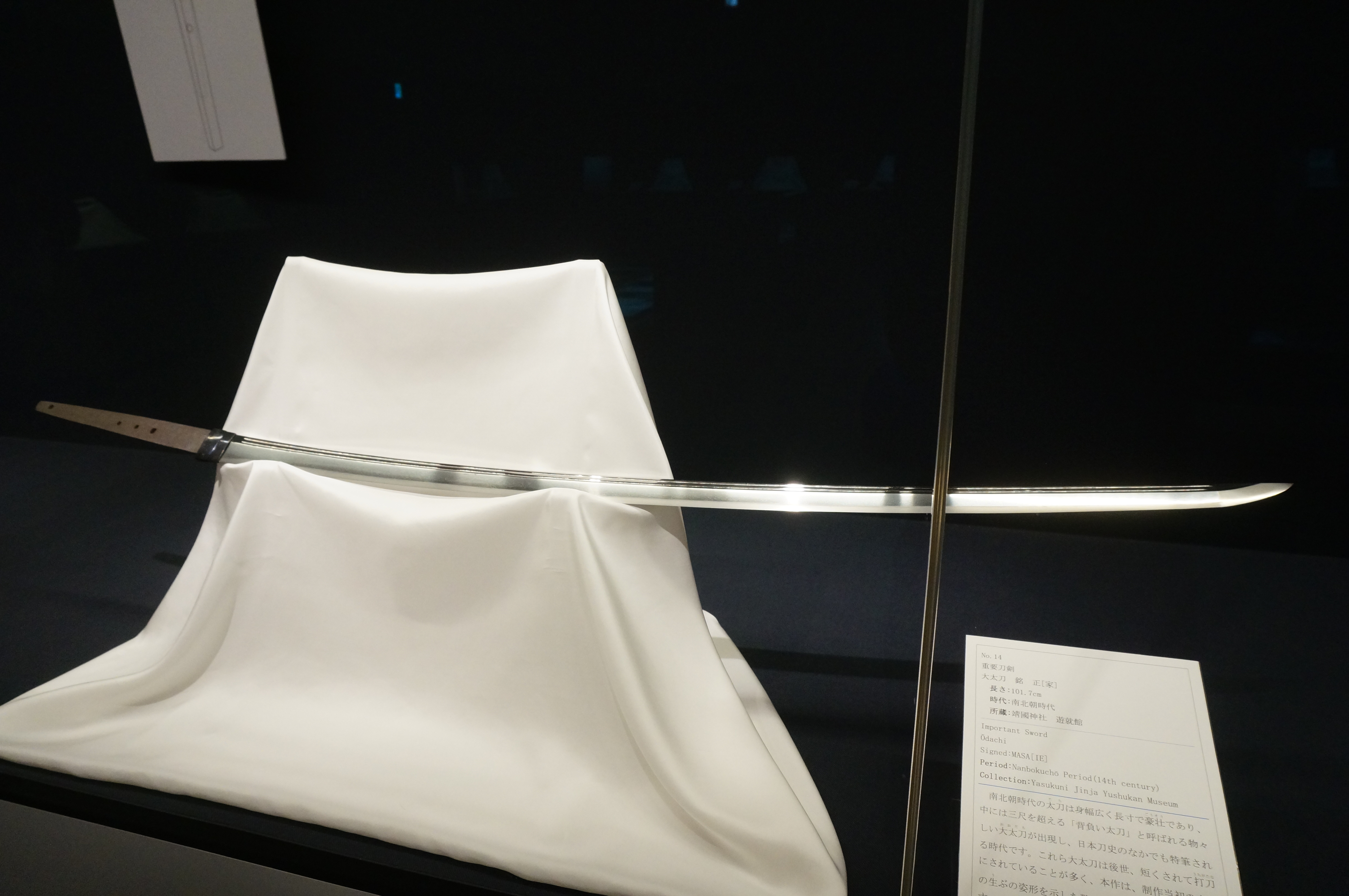
- An ōdachi forged by Sadaie, 14th century, Nanboku-chō period, Important sword
- Type: Sword
- Place of origin: Japan

Service history
- Used by: Samurai, kenjutsu, iaido practitioners

Production history
- Produced: Kamakura period (1185－1333) to present

Specifications
- Mass: 2.2–14.5 kg (4.9–32.0 lb)
- Blade length: approx. 90.9 cm (35.8 in) (3 shaku)–226.7 cm (89.3 in) (7 shaku, 5 sun)
- Blade type: Curved, single-edged
- Hilt type: Two-handed swept, with circular or squared guard. Material: wood, metal, ivory, fish skin, silk
- Scabbard/sheath: Lacquered wood

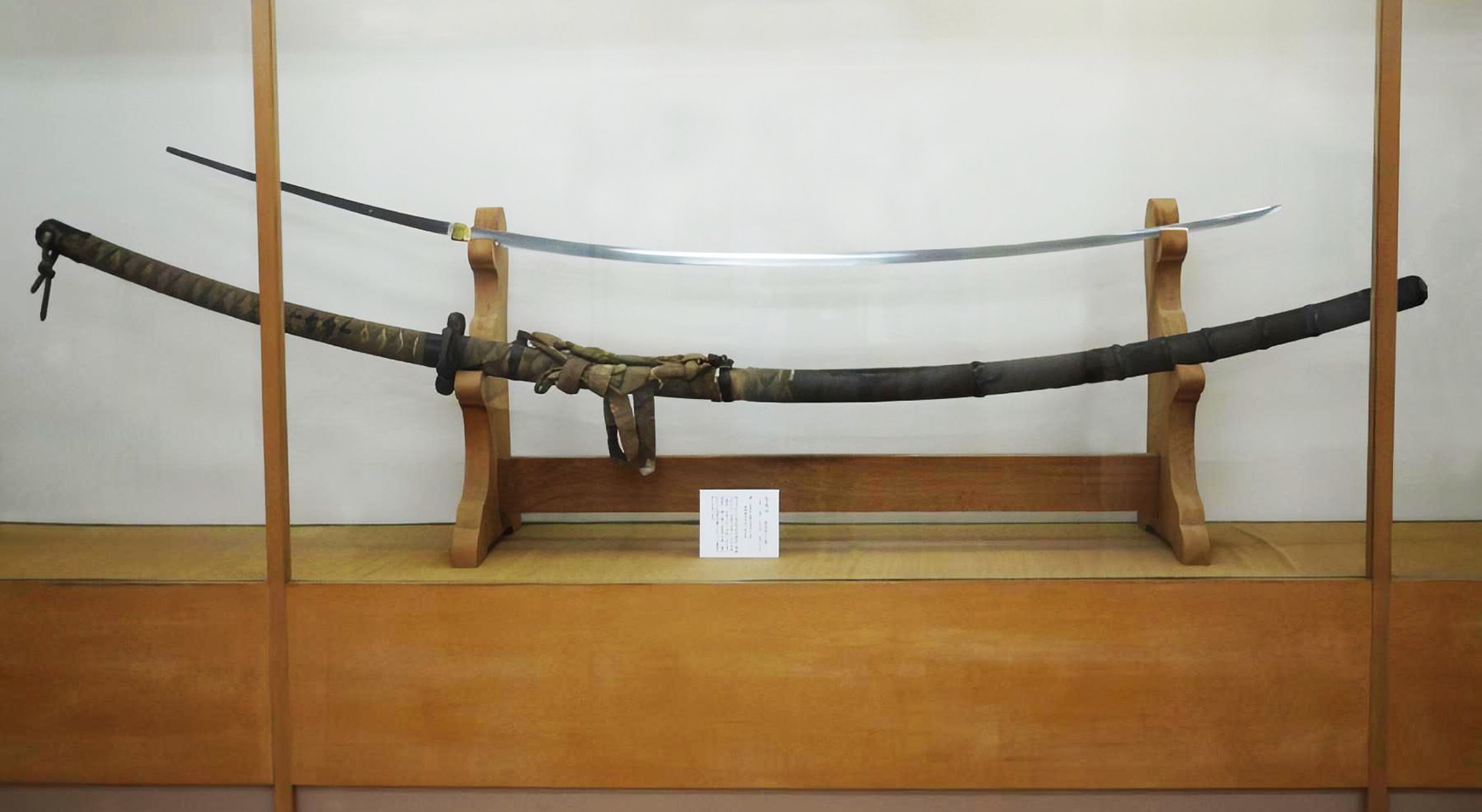
The Odachi Masayoshi forged by bladesmith Sanke Masayoshi, dated 1844. The blade length is 225.43 cm (88.75 in) and the tang is 92.41 cm (36.38 in).

An ōdachi (大太刀, large/great sword) or nodachi (野太刀, field sword) is a type of traditionally made Japanese sword (日本刀, nihontō) used by the samurai class of feudal Japan. The Chinese equivalent of this type of sword in terms of weight and length is the miaodao or the earlier zhanmadao, and the Western battlefield equivalent (though less similar) is the Zweihänder.

To qualify as an ōdachi, the sword in question would have a blade length of around 3 shaku (90.9 cm (35.8 in)). However, as with most terms in Japanese sword arts, there is no exact definition of the size of an ōdachi.

== Etymology ==
The character for ō (大) means "big" or "great"; no (野) means "field". The dachi here (太刀) is simply the voiced compounding version of the term tachi (太刀, great sword), the older style of sword that predates the katana. The second character in tachi, 刀, is the Chinese character for "blade" (see also dāo), and is also the same character used to spell katana (刀) and the tō in nihontō (日本刀 "Japanese sword").

The word tachi itself is derived as the stem or noun form of verb tatsu (断つ; "to cut off"). The kanji spelling is an example of jukujikun, applying a semantically based kanji spelling without regard to the usual phonetic values of the characters.

== History ==
Ōdachi became popular in Kamakura period (1185－1333). Until the middle of the Kamakura period, high-ranking samurai mainly fought on horseback with yumi (bows), but as group battles by foot soldiers increased from the late Kamakura period, the importance of weapons possessed by those who did not have horses and did not have sufficient training in bows increased. Until then, they mainly used naginata with a long handle, but they also started to use ōdachi. The Kamakura period was the first time that samurai ruled Japan, and powerful men were valued, and those who wanted to show off the honor of being a warrior preferred to use ōdachi.

In the Nanboku-chō period in the 14th century, huge Japanese swords such as ōdachi were at their peak. The reason for this is thought to be that the conditions for making a practical large-sized sword were established due to the nationwide spread of strong and sharp swords of the Sōshū school. In the case of ōdachi whose blade was 150 cm (59 in) long, it was impossible to draw a sword from the scabbard on the waist, so people carried it on their back or had their servants carry it. Large naginata and kanabō were also popular in this period. However, infantry units gradually came to be equipped with yari (spears) in addition to naginata, and because ōdachi was disadvantageous for mountain battles and surprise attacks, and only a few powerful men could use it effectively, this trend ended for a short time. Furthermore, from the Sengoku period in the latter part of the Muromachi period to the Azuchi-Momoyama period, as tactics shifted to fighting with yari and tanegashima (guns) by a large group of infantry, ōdachi became even more obsolete. As ōdachi became useless, it was often replaced with a tachi and uchigatana.

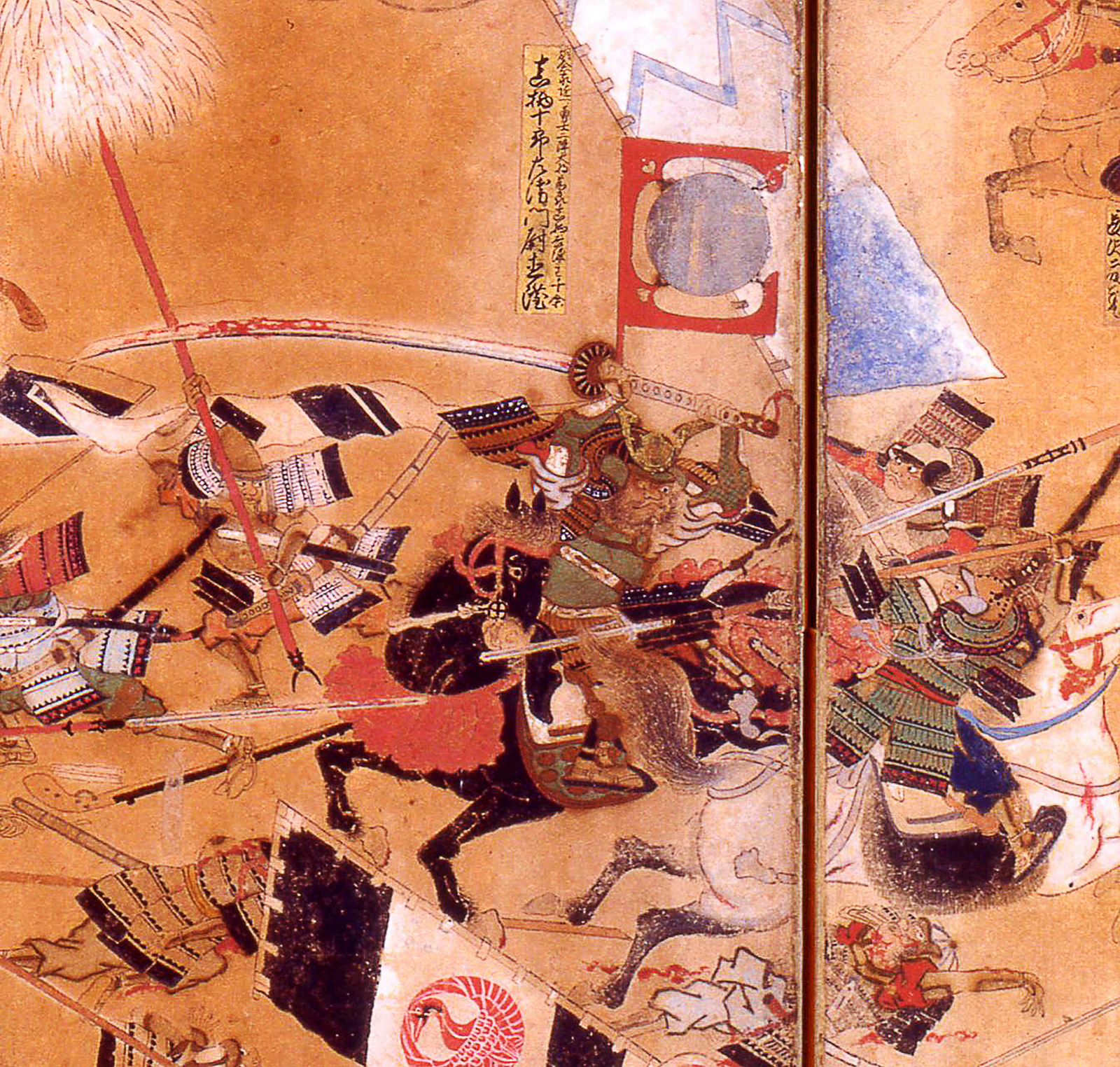
Magara Naotaka, a retainer of the Asakura clan in the Battle of Anegawa. He was famous as a master of a ōdachi named Taro tachi (太郎太刀) with a length of blade of 7 shaku 3 sun (approx. 221 cm (87 in) or the whole length of 9 shaku 5 sun (approx. 288 cm (113 in)).

Even so, sengoku-daimyo in the Sengoku period dared to equip their own troops with ōdachi in order to show off their strength and bravery. Uesugi Kenshin had men more than six shaku (approx. 182 cm (72 in)) tall equipped with an ōdachi guard around his horse. The Asakura clan made a troop called Rikishizei (力士勢) equip with an ōdachi with a blade length of 5 shaku (approx. 152 cm (60 in)), and fought well against the troop of Oda Nobunaga in the Battle of Anegawa.

The ōdachi was used as a weapon, but because of its magnificent appearance, it was often used as an offering to kami, a Shinto shrine. For example, Ōyamazumi Shrine, which is said to be a treasure house of Japanese swords and armor, is dedicated to the national treasure Ōdachi, which was dedicated by Emperor Go-Murakami, and ōdachi, which was dedicated by Ōmori Naoharu and killed Kusunoki Masashige.

In the peaceful Edo period, ōdachi was no longer regarded as a practical weapon and came to be recognized only as an offering to the kami of Shinto shrines.

According to the historical book Wakan Shuyo (和翰集要), the nodachi (野太刀) had a blade length of 3 shaku (traditional Japanese feet) and 9 sun (traditional Japanese inches; approx. 148 cm (58 in)) and ōdachi had a blade length of 3 shaku 3 sun (approx. 125 cm (49 in)), but in fact, they were not strictly distinguished between nodachi and ōdachi, and it is thought that the term ōdachi indicated a long tachi, and the term nodachi indicated an ōdachi used in field battles (in keeping with the name, since the initial no (野) literally means "field").

== Production ==
Ōdachi are difficult to produce because their length makes traditional heat treatment more complicated: The longer a blade is, the more difficult (and expensive) it is to heat the whole blade to a homogeneous temperature, both for annealing and to reach the hardening temperature. The quenching process then needs a bigger quenching medium because uneven quenching might lead to warping the blade.

The method of polishing is also different. Because of their size, ōdachi are usually hung from the ceiling or placed in a stationary position to be polished, unlike normal swords which are moved over polishing stones.

== Method of use ==
As battlefield weapons, ōdachi were too long for samurai to carry on their waists like normal swords. There were two main methods in which they could be carried. One was to carry it on one's back and unsheathe before battle starts. The other method was simply to carry the sheathed ōdachi by hand. The trend during the Muromachi era was for the samurai carrying the ōdachi to have a follower to help draw it.

An exception does exist, though. The Kōden Enshin-ryū taught by Fumon Tanaka use a special drawing technique for "short" ōdachi allowing it to be carried on the waist. The technique is to pull out the sheath rather than drawing the blade. While this move is also used in other schools, for example, Yagyū Shinkage-ryū, Shin musō Hayashizaki-ryū and Iaidō, only Enshin-ryū seems to have used it to improve the drawing speed of an ōdachi, the other schools having used it with classical katana. The Kage-ryū style is also used to draw from the belt, using blades of approximately 2.8 shaku (84.9 cm (33.4 in).

Ōdachi swordplay styles differed from that of other Japanese swords, focusing on downward cuts.

One possible use of ōdachi is as large anti-cavalry weapons, to strike down the horse as it approaches. Alternatively, it could be used as a cavalry-on-cavalry weapon comparable to the Chinese zhanmadao, with the long reach, increased weight and slashing area of the blade offering some advantages over spears, lances, and smaller swords.

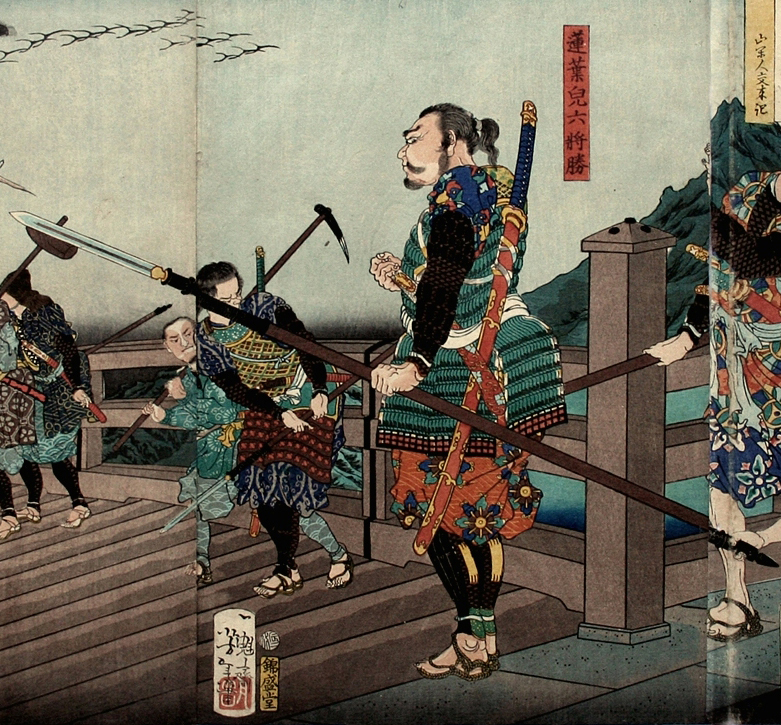
Edo period ukiyo-e shows an ōdachi worn on the back of a samurai.

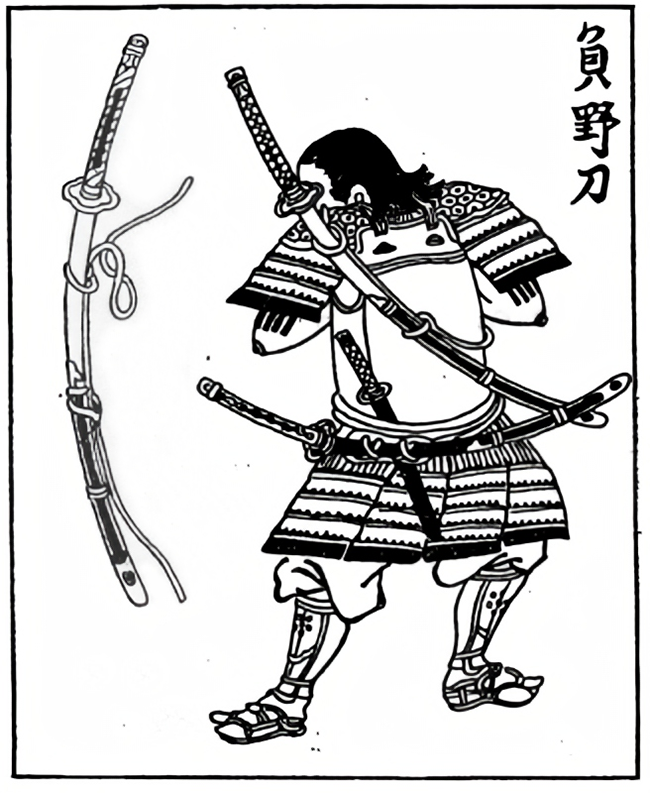
A wood block print of a samurai carrying a nodachi/ōdachi on his back

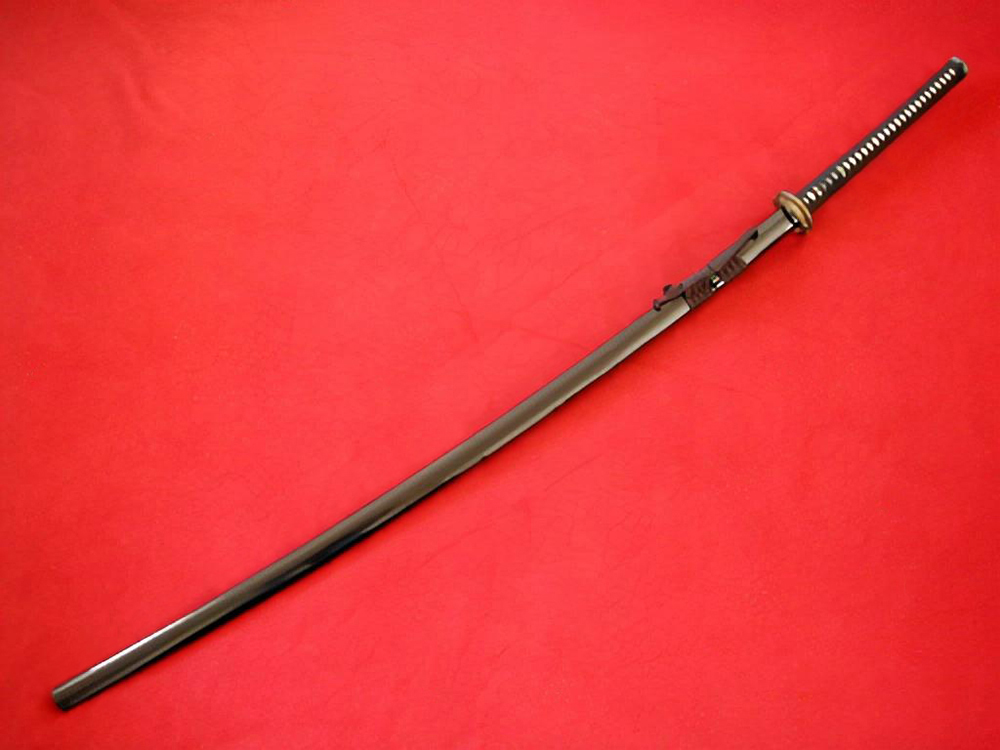
A sheathed ōdachi

== Notable ōdachi ==
=== Ōdachi Norimitsu ===
One of the longest ōdachi is the Odachi Norimitsu, with a total length of 377 cm (148 in). It was forged by the Japanese master bladesmith Norimitsu Osafune in the former Bishū province in August 1446. It is kept in the Yahiko jinja (弥彦神社) in the village of Yahiko, Nishikanbara District, Niigata Prefecture, Japan. A special attribute is that this blade was forged from one piece, similarly to the conventional Japanese katana; it was not forged from multiple pieces or sections. This required the skill of a master bladesmith. The blade, hada, and hamon are authentic. This ōdachi has a bo-hi (fuller). Norimitsu was a famous line of swordsmiths that began in the Oei Bizen school (1394) and continued until the end of Bizen. Around 2000, it was polished and named "Kibitsu maru" by the priest of Kibitsu Shrine in Okayama Prefecture.

==== Specifications ====
These are the specifications of the Ōdachi Norimitsu.

- Total length: 377 cm (148 in)
- Nagasa (cutting edge): 226.7 cm (89.3 in)
- Sori (curvature): 5 cm (2.0 in)
- Nakago (tang): 151 cm (59 in)
- Blade thickness (maximum): 2.34 cm (0.92 in)
- Habaki (collar to hold blade in scabbard): 5.85 cm (2.30 in)
- Weight: 14.5 kg (32 lb)
- Mei (blade signature; 銘): Bishu Osafune Norimitsu (備州)
- Location: Kibitsu Shrine, Okayama.
- Production date: August 1446 (Muromachi period)
- Sugata (blade shape): Shinogi-zukuri, maru-mune, bo-hi with maru-dome
- Hada (grain pattern; 肌): Itame
- Hamon (temper pattern): Ko-gunome, choji with tobiyaki and kinsuji.

=== Haja-no-Ontachi ===
The longest known ōdachi is the Haja-no-Ontachi (Great Evil-Crushing Blade). Its length is 465 cm (183 in) with an overall weight of 75 kg (165 lb). In 1859, this ōdachi was donated to the Hanaoka Hachiman Shrine in Yamaguchi during an imperial memorial ceremony by parishioners who sympathized with imperial patriots. It is kept in the Treasure House which is not open to the public.

== See also ==
- Changdao
- Great sword
- Miaodao
- Nagamaki
- Zhanmadao
- Zweihänder

== Sources ==
- Nick Evangelista: The Encyclopedia of the Sword. Greenwood Publishing Group, 1995, p. 419, ISBN 978-0-313-27896-9.
- Stephen Turnbull: The Samurai Swordsman: Master of War. Publisher: Tuttle Publishing, 2008, ISBN 978-4-8053-0956-8.
