= Dadao (sword) =

Chinese saber from the late Qing dynasty

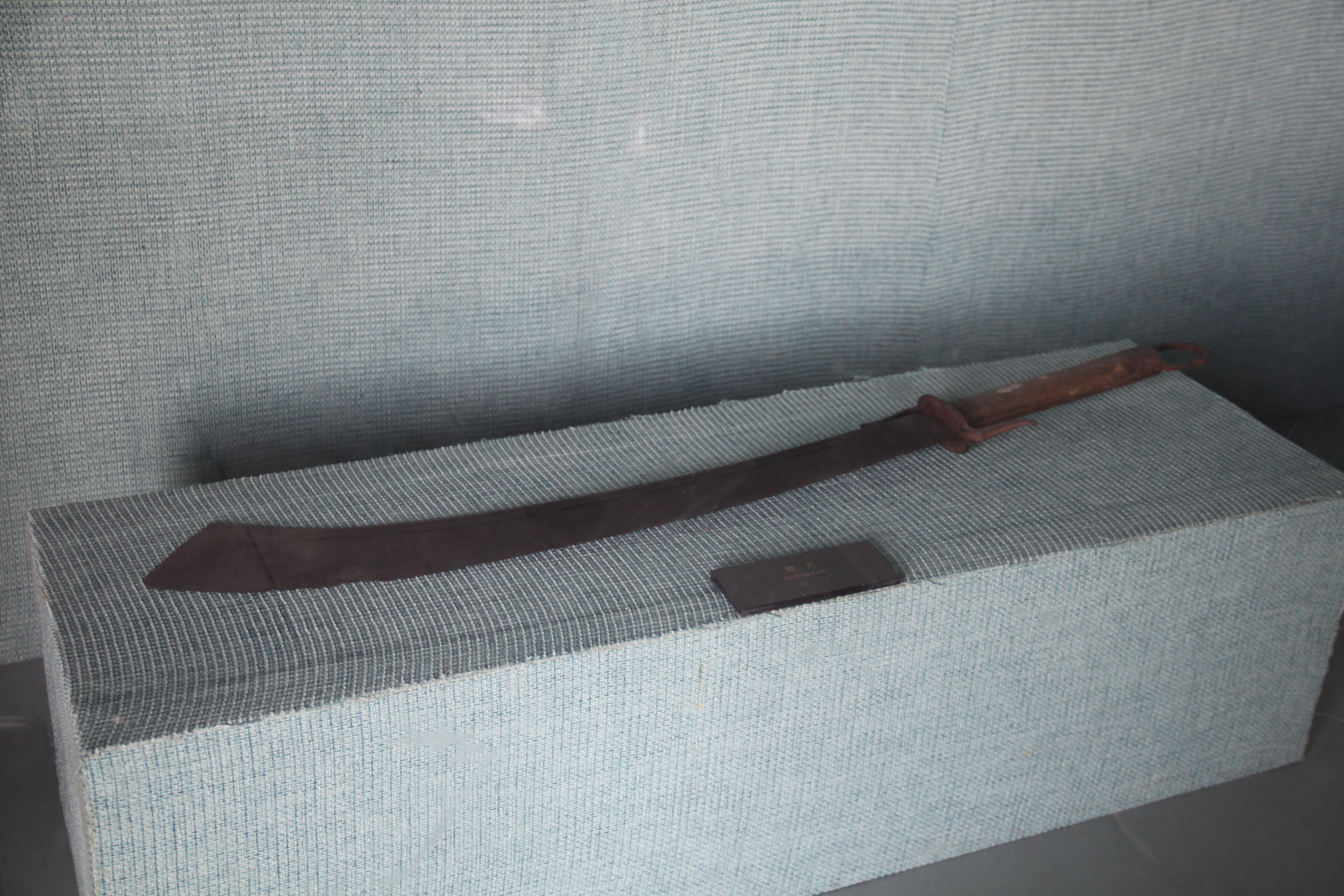
Antique dadao showing ring pommel, and alternating quillons

The dadao (Chinese: 大刀; pinyin: dàdāo; lit. 'large knife/sabre') was a type of Chinese saber (dao) of the late Qing dynasty which remained in use as a civilian and military sword through the end of World War II. The term refers to a whole family of swords, which can vary in blade, guard, and grip configurations. Common elements include a grip long enough to accommodate 2 hands, but with a relatively short and wide blade. Ring pommels are very common, but not exclusively used at the end of the grip. Blade profiles often flare towards the foible and may have a clipped tip.

== Origin of name ==
The term dadao has been in use since at least the Ming dynasty, where it was originally used to refer to large polearm mounted sabres. Although similar short and wide bladed dao are seen in Ming era artwork, the form of sword known today as dadao dating to the late Qing and the early 19th century. The term Kan Dao (砍刀, lit. Chopping knife) was also used to refer to these heavy bladed dao.

== Use ==
The dadao is a hand-and-a-half sword, in that it can accommodate two handed use, but is still nimble enough for single handed use. Its clipped tip allows for stabbing actions while the broad thin blade allows it to excel at powerful sweeping cuts.

During the early 20th century the dadao was popular both with martial arts schools, militias, and the military; the weight and balance of the dadao gave it considerable slashing and chopping power, making it an effective close combat weapon. In the opening engagements with the Japanese during the Second Sino-Japanese War, soldiers armed with dadao famously defended Beijing in the Marco Polo Bridge incident. Although writers during the 1930s do lay out specifications for a sword with a 23-inch (58 cm) blade, 3 inched clip back, and a weight of 3.5 lbs, decentralized production resulted in incredibly varied designs; even military examples show tremendous variety in styles of sword compared to other military pattern blades.

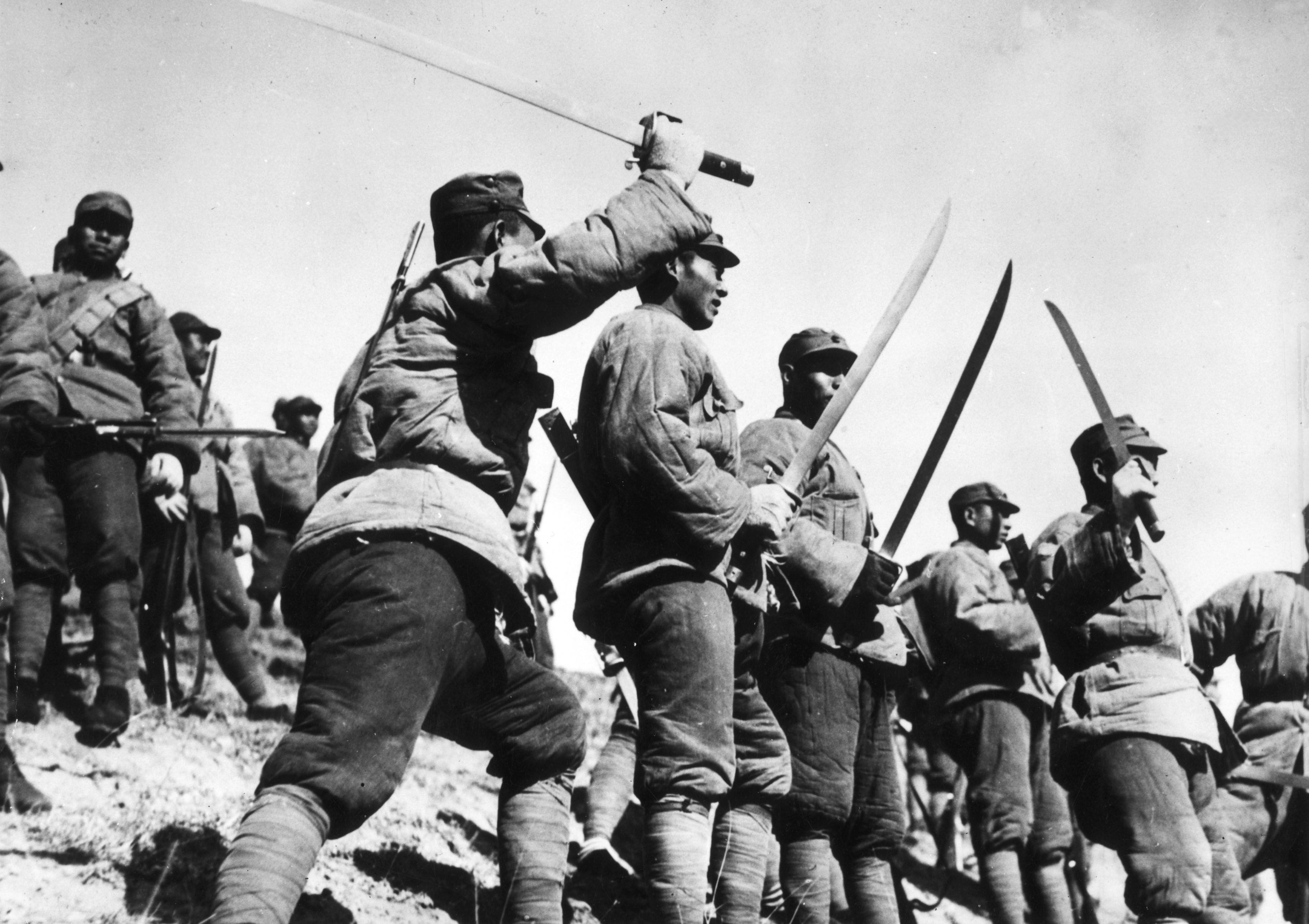
Chinese soldiers from a "Big Sword Unit" during the Japanese attack of Rehe Province, China, 1933

== See also ==
- Oxtail Dao
- Yanmaodao
- Liuyedao
- Guandao
- Podao
- The Sword March
- Defense of the Great Wall
