= The Sword March =

Chinese patriotic song

- Traditional Chinese: 大刀進行曲
- Simplified Chinese: 大刀进行曲
- Literal meaning: The Big-Knife March
Transcriptions
Standard Mandarin
- Hanyu Pinyin: Dàdāo Jìnxíngqǔ
- Wade–Giles: Ta-tao Chin-hsing-chu

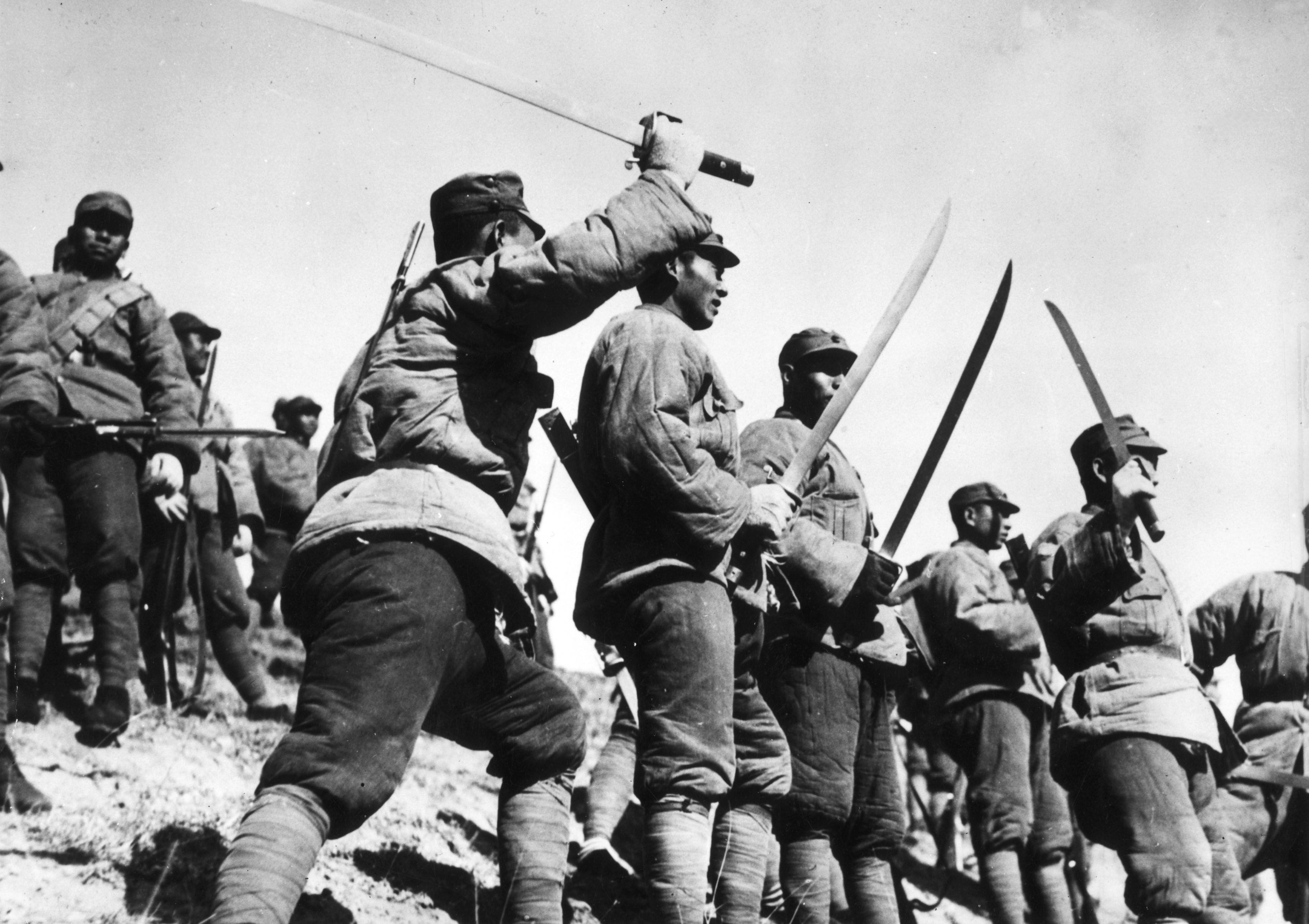
Chinese soldiers with swords.

"The Sword March" is a Chinese patriotic song first sung in the Republic of China during the Second Sino-Japanese War (World War II) after the Japanese invasion of 1937. It is also known in Chinese by its first line, Dàdāo xiàng guǐzi de tóu shàng kǎn qù: "Let our dadaos hack towards the devils' heads!"

== History ==
Mai Xin wrote the song in 1937 specifically to honour the valour of the 29th Army during the Marco Polo Bridge Incident, where their standard weapons were only a rifle and a sword known in Chinese as a dadao. The long-hilted Dadao, with its powerful chopping blade, was a favourite weapon of peasant militias. As this name literally means "big knife", the song was also known as "The Big Sword March". Guizi—literally, "the hateful one(s)"—was a racial epithet formerly used against the Western powers during the failed Boxer Rebellion; the anthem helped popularise its use in reference to the Japanese, which remains current in modern China.

The lyrics were later changed to broaden its appeal from just the 29th to the "entire nation's" armed forces. This song became the de facto army marching cadence in the Chinese National Revolutionary Army. The Chinese television series known in English as Chop! in fact used the song's opening line as its title. It also appears in the films Lust, Caution and The Children of Huang Shi.

== Lyrics ==
Simplified Chinese	Traditional Chinese	Pinyin	English Translation
大刀向鬼子们的头上砍去！ 全国武装的弟兄们！ 抗战的一天来到了， 抗战的一天来到了！ 前面有东北的义勇军， 后面有全国的老百姓， 咱们中国军队勇敢前进！ 看准那敌人！ 把他消灭，把他消灭！ 冲啊！ 大刀向鬼子们的头上砍去！ 杀！	大刀向鬼子們的頭上砍去！ 全國武裝的弟兄們！ 抗戰的一天來到了， 抗戰的一天來到了！ 前面有東北的義勇軍， 後面有全國的老百姓， 咱們中國軍隊勇敢前進， 看準那敵人！ 把他消滅，把他消滅！ 衝啊！ 大刀向鬼子們的頭上砍去！ 殺！	Dàdāo xiàng guǐzi men de tóu shàng kǎn qù! Quánguó wǔzhuāng de dìxiongmen! Kàngzhàn de yītiān láidào liǎo, Kàngzhàn de yītiān láidào liǎo! Qiánmian yǒu dōngběi de yìyǒngjūn, Hòumian yǒu quánguó de lǎo bǎixìng, Zánmen Zhōngguó jūnduì yǒnggǎn qiánjìn, Kàn zhǔn nà dírén! Bǎ tā xiāomiè, bǎ tā xiāomiè! Chōng a! Dàdāo xiàng guǐzi men de tóu shàng kǎn qù! Shā!	Let our dadaos hack towards the devils' heads! The whole nation's armed brethren, The day of our defence has come! The day of our defence has come! In front, the northeast volunteers! In the rear, the populace of the entire nation! Our Chinese army, valiantly advancing! See there! The Enemy! Destroy them! Destroy them! Charge! Our swords raised over the devils' heads, hack 'em off! Kill!
