= Wodao =

Ming dynasty Chinese sword type

The wodao (Chinese: 倭刀; lit. 'Japanese (wo people) sword') is a Chinese sword from the Ming dynasty and Qing dynasty. It is typically long and slender, but heavy, with a curved back and sharp blade. It bears a strong resemblance to the Tang sword, changdao, tachi or ōdachi in form. Extant examples show a handle approximately 25.5 cm (10.0 in) long, with a gently curved blade 80 cm (31 in) long.

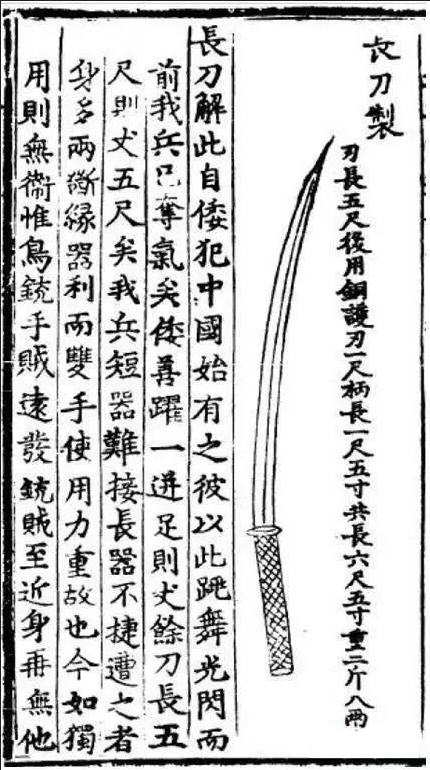
The wodao sword (Japanese pirate's sword) recorded in the Jixiao Xinshu written by the Ming dynasty general Qi Jiguang. It is a very long sword, with a blade length of 5 feet, similar to the Japanese ōdachi sword.

The Chinese word wo literally means "Japanese", so wodao literally means "Japanese sword". The term wodao sometimes refers to Japanese swords, but it mainly refers to similar swords developed in China with Japanese swords used as reference. Chinese wodao was developed based on the Japanese sword used by the wokou pirates, a mixed group of Japanese and Chinese who repeatedly looted on the Chinese coast. Qi Jiguang (1528-1588 AD), a general of the Ming Dynasty, studied wokou's tactics and Japanese swords to repel wokou pirates. General Qi also wrote a military book named Jixiao Xinshu which depicted, among other things, the detailed usage of the wodao. He also included a wodao branch in his army alongside branches of other weapons. Another Ming general Li Chengxun (李承勋), in his own revised edition of Jixiao Xinshu of 1588, quoted General Qi as saying that the long sword (believed to be referring to the ōdachi and tachi) was introduced into China during the wokou invasion of the Ming dynasty.

The Chinese martial art of wielding the wodao is believed to be a combination of medieval Japanese sword fighting styles and traditional Chinese techniques regarding the use of two-handed weapons. The term wodao was still in usage in China until the Qing dynasty as evidenced in various Chinese novels at the time.

In 1921, the Chinese warlord Cao Kun created a branch in his army that specialized in wielding two-handed single edged blades and called it the miaodao branch. Since then, miaodao became the name for this form of Chinese two-handed single edged blade and the term wodao is now rarely used. The art of wielding the miaodao can be traced back to the lineage of Jixiao Xinshu.

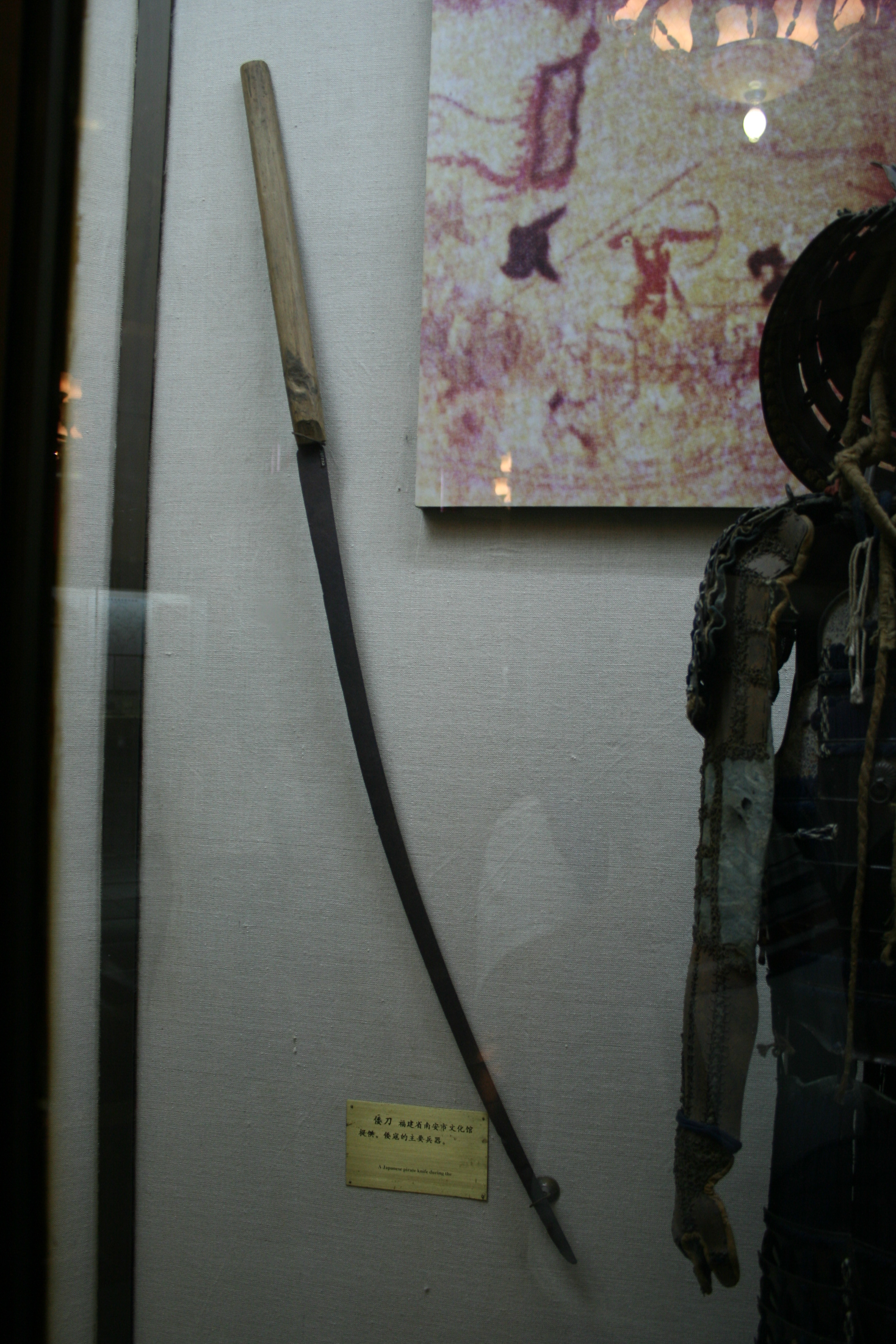
A long wodao sword currently in existence in a Chinese museum.

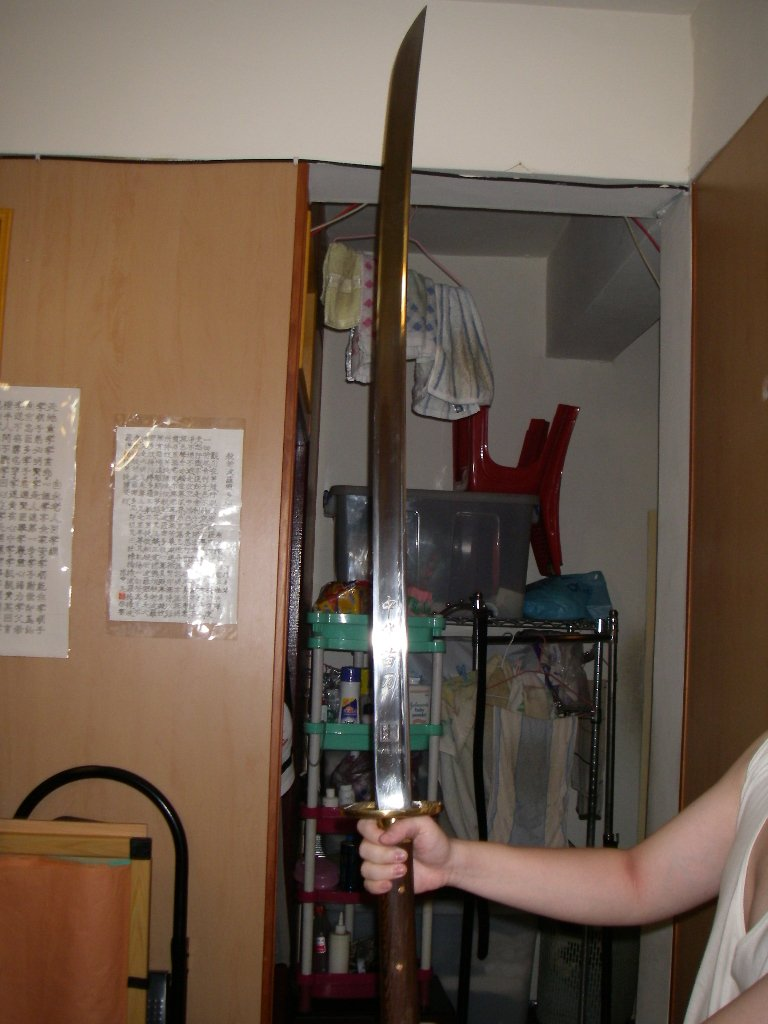
The 21st-century miaodao sword used in Chinese martial arts, developed from the long wodao sword of the Ming dynasty.

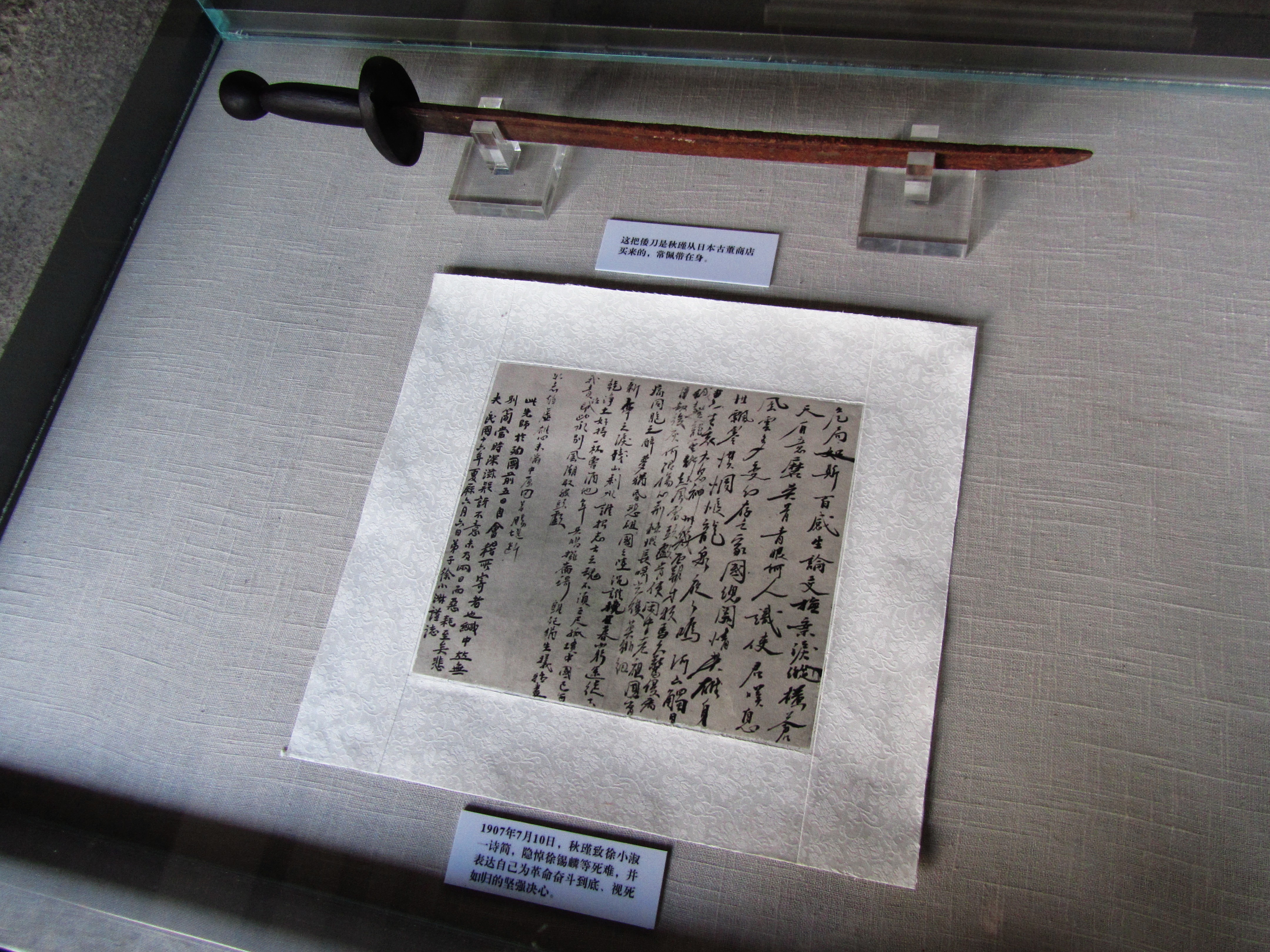
Qiu Jin's wodao at Datong Academy in Shaoxing, Zhejiang, China. This is a one-handed sabre-like style sword that has been reformed.

== See also ==
- Katana
