= Miaodao =

Chinese two-handed sword

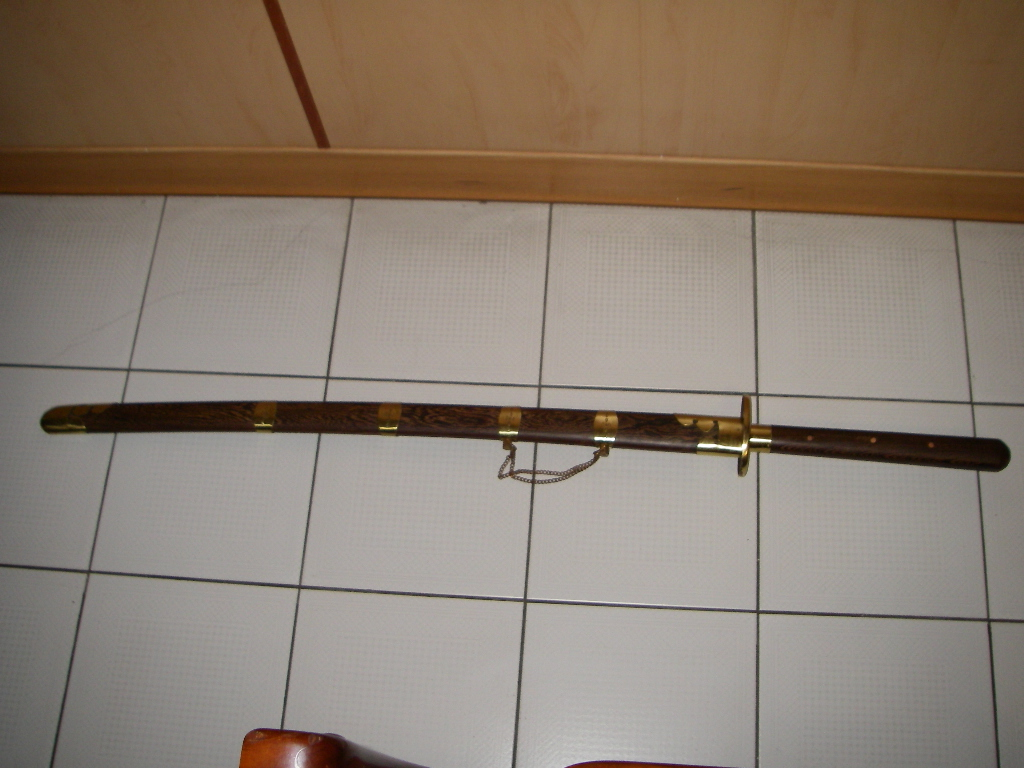
Miaodao in its scabbard

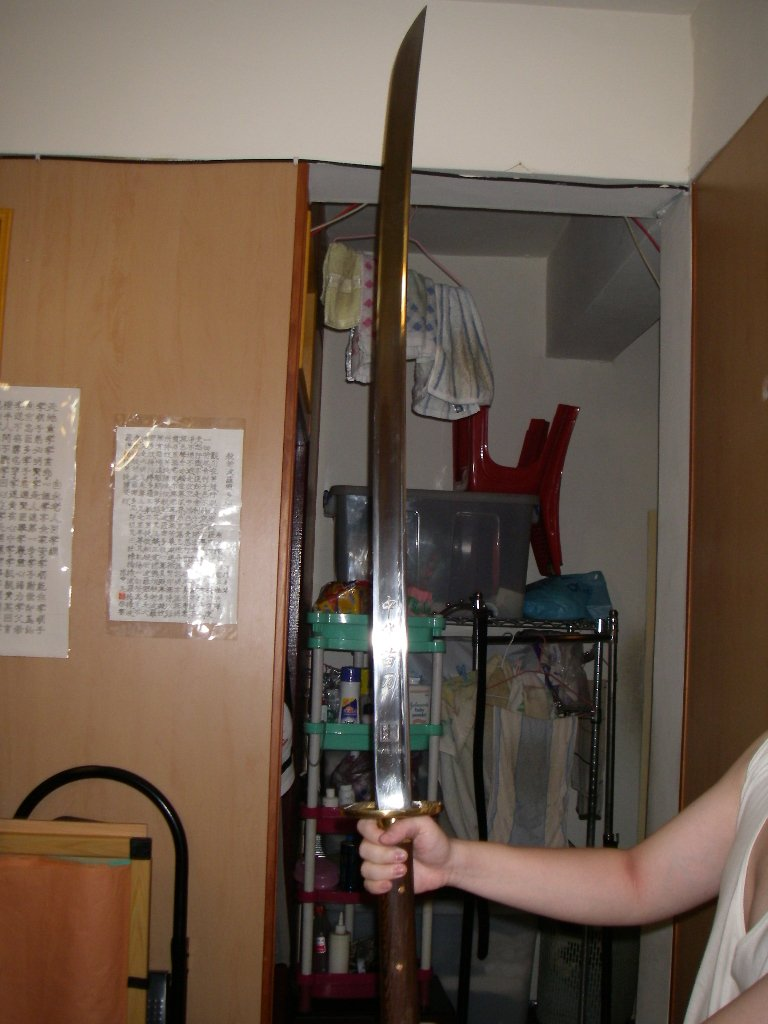
Miaodao blade

The miaodao (苗刀) is a Chinese two-handed dao or saber, with a narrow blade, long hilt, and an overall length of 1.2 m (3 ft 11 in) or longer. The name means "sprout saber", presumably referring to a likeness between the weapon and a newly sprouted plant. An early reference, in Jin Yiming's Single Defense-Saber, makes a connection between the miaodao and the Qing-era wodao, as well as mentioning both single and two-handed versions of the miaodao, suggesting that the name originally described the shape only, without any connotations of size. While the miaodao is a recent weapon, the name has come to be applied to a variety of earlier Chinese long sabers, such as the zhanmadao and changdao. Along with the dadao, miaodao were used by some Chinese troops during the Second Sino-Japanese War.

While the miaodao is rarely practiced in modern Chinese martial arts, some schools of Piguaquan and Tongbeiquan (in the Guo Changsheng lineage) and Xingyiquan train with the weapon. The miaodao is also often mistakenly claimed to have been one of the weapons taught at the Central Military Academy in Nanjing; the weapon in question was actually a European-style officer's saber, though some later schools may have based miaodao techniques on this form.

Despite being written the same way (苗), the "miao" of miaodao should not be confused with the Miao ethnic group, who are not associated with this weapon.

== Gallery ==
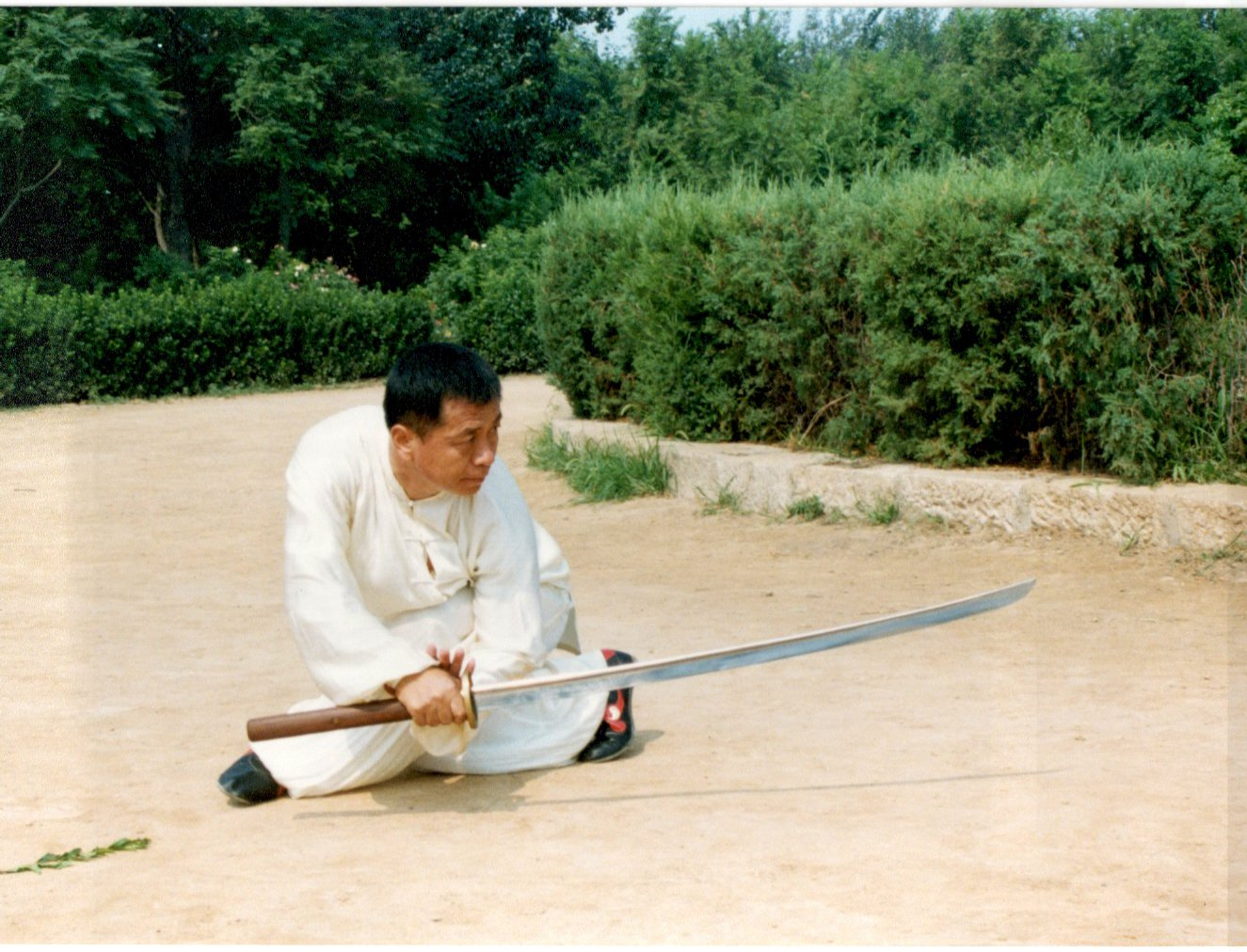
Wang Zhihai performing with a miaodao

== See also ==
- Chinese sword
- Dao (Chinese sword)
- Japanese sword
- Katana
