= Niuweidao =

Type of Chinese sabre

Niuweidao

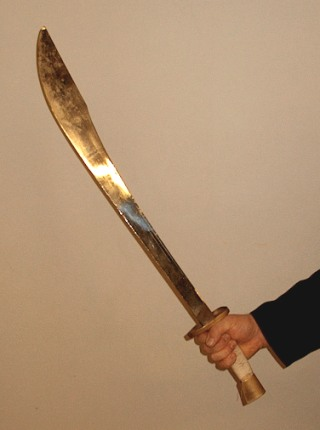
A Chinese sword shaped like a liuyedao (note: controversial. This knife is wider at the top and narrower at the bottom. It should be a niuweidao that is often mistaken for a liuyedao)

The niuweidao (Chinese: 牛尾刀; pinyin: niúwěidāo; lit. 'ox-tailed sword') was a type of Chinese saber (dao) of the late Qing dynasty period. A heavy bladed weapon with a characteristic flaring tip, it is the archetypal "Chinese broadsword" of kung fu movies today. It was first recorded in the early 19th century (the latter half of the Qing dynasty) and only as a civilian weapon: there is no record of it being issued to Imperial troops, and it does not appear in any listing of official weaponry. Its appearance in movies and modern literature is thus often anachronistic.

== Rerefence paper ==
- Tom PMW (2001). "Some Notable Sabers of the Qing Dynasty at the Metropolitan Museum of Art". Vol. 36. Metropolitan Museum Journal. pp. 11, 207–222. doi:10.2307/1513063. JSTOR 1513063.
- Lorge PA (2011). Chinese Martial Arts: From Antiquity to the Twenty-First Century. Cambridge University Press. ISBN 978-0-521-87881-4.
