= Liuyedao =

Chinese sword

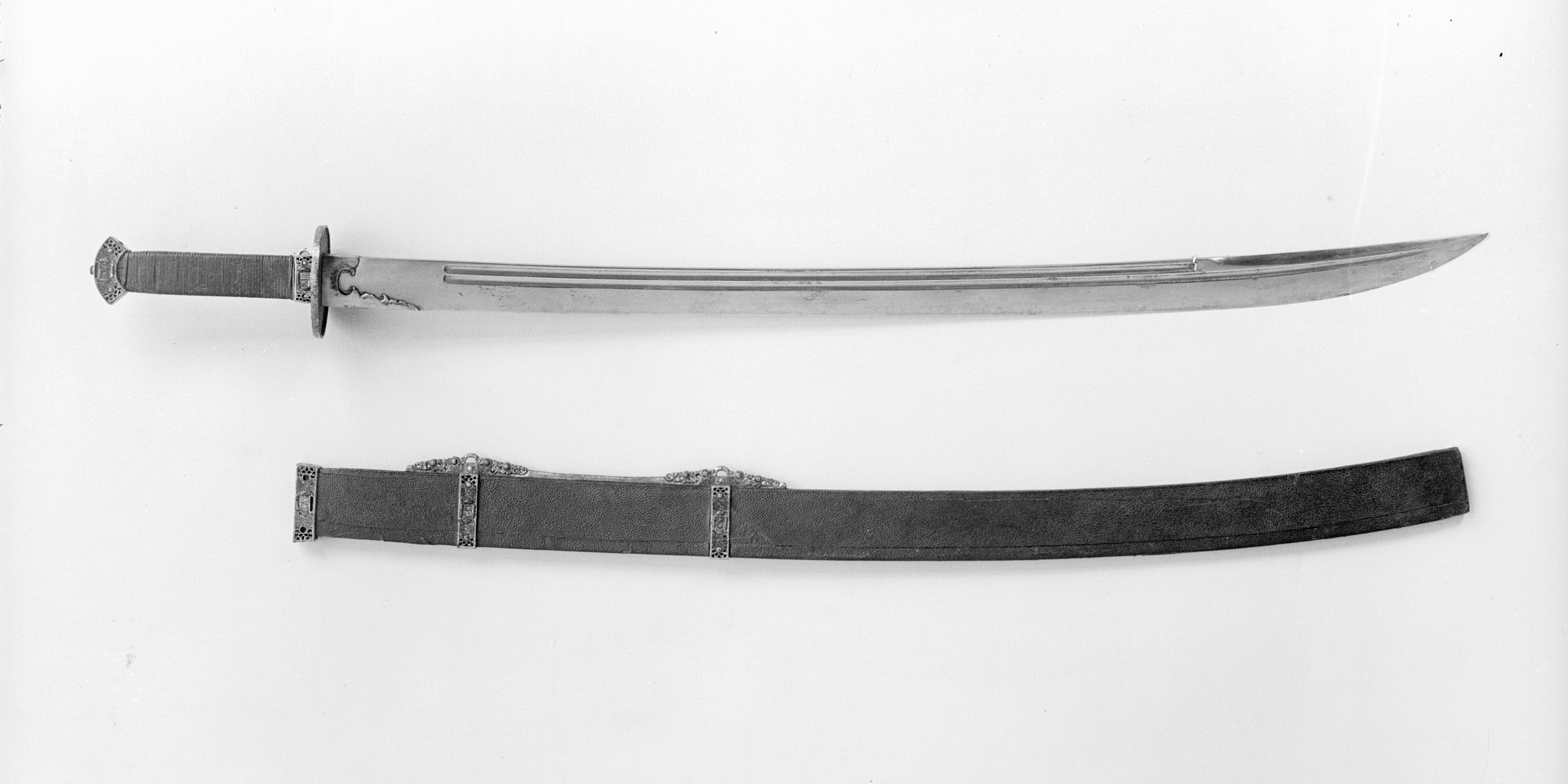
- A 17th–18th century liuyedao with gilt iron fittings at the Metropolitan Museum of Art
- Traditional Chinese: 柳葉刀
- Simplified Chinese: 柳叶刀
- Literal meaning: willow leaf knife
Transcriptions
Standard Mandarin
- Hanyu Pinyin: liǔyèdāo
Yue: Cantonese
- Yale Romanization: láuhyihpdōu
- Jyutping: lau5 jip6 dou1

The liuyedao or "willow-leaf saber" is a type of dao that was commonly used as a military sidearm for both cavalry and infantry during the Ming and Qing dynasties. A descendant of the earlier Mongol sabre the liuyedao remained the most popular type of single handed sabre during the Ming dynasty, replacing the role of the jian as an issued weapon in the military. Many schools of Chinese martial arts originally trained with this weapon.

This weapon features a moderate curve along the length of the blade. This reduces thrusting ability (though it is still fairly effective at same) while increasing the power of cuts and slashes. The hilts are typically straight, but can be re-curved downward starting in the 18th century. It weighs from 2 to 3 lb (0.91 to 1.36 kg), and is 36 to 39 in (91 to 99 cm) long.

Many examples will often have a decorated collar at the throat of the blade called a tunkou, which is a stylistic holdover from the preceding designs.

== Gallery ==
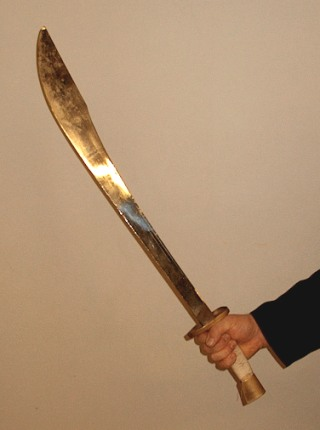
A Chinese sword shaped like a liuyedao (note: controversial. This knife is wider at the top and narrower at the bottom. It should be a niuweidao that is often mistaken for a liuyedao)

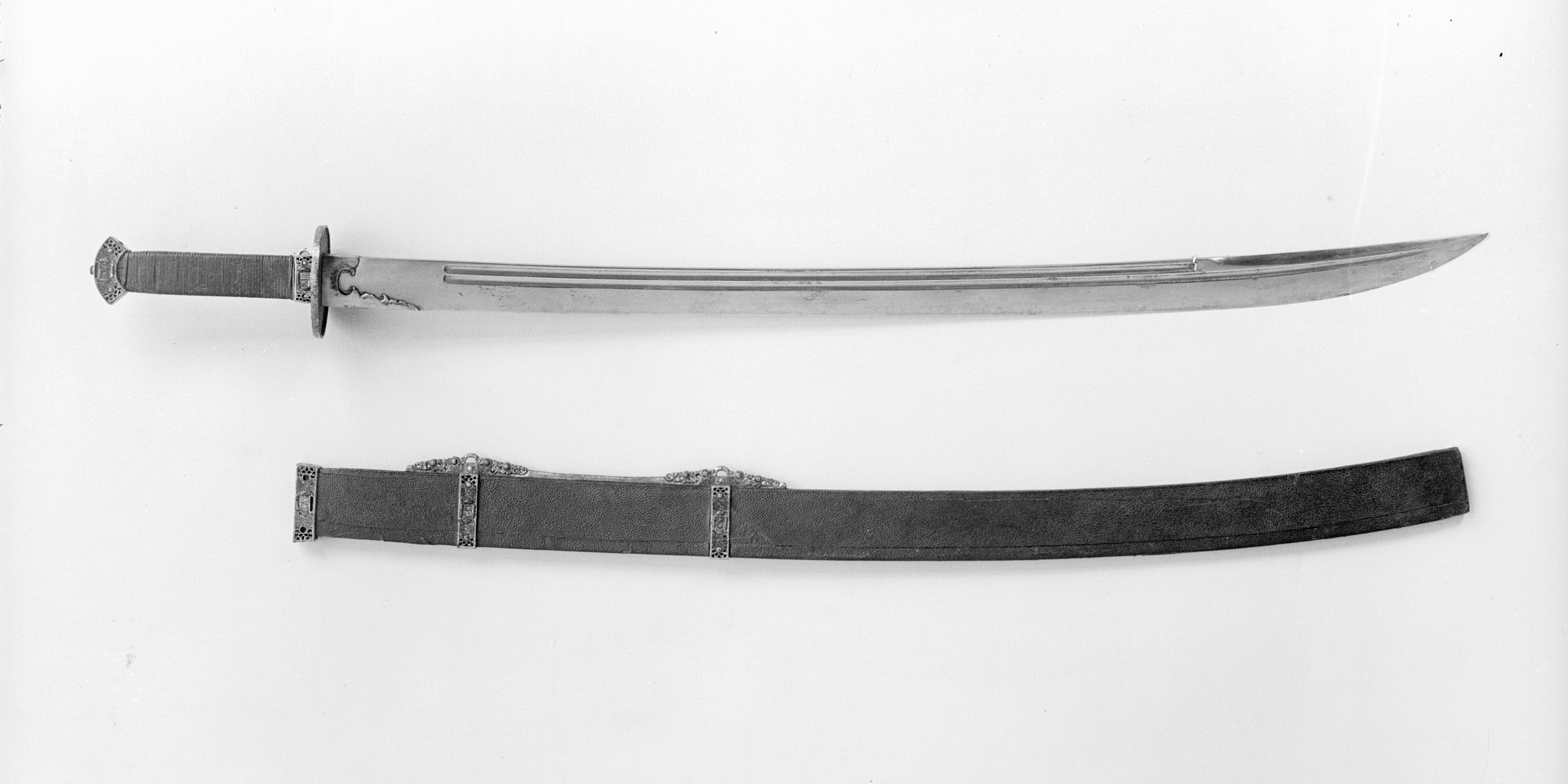
A liuyedao from the 17th to 18th century (Note: Controversial. The shape of this blade is relatively straight, and the tip is curved, more like a yanmaodao.)

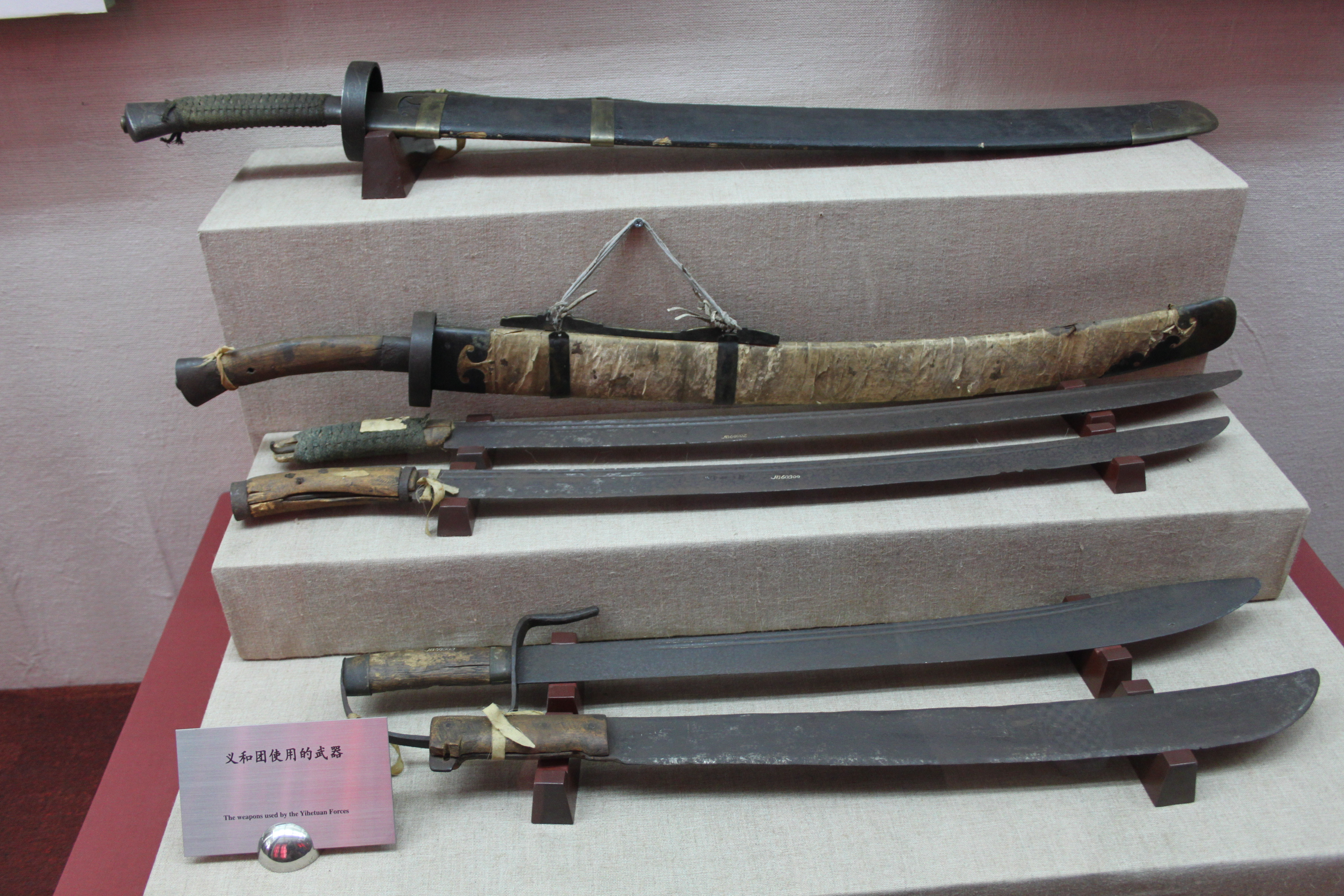
liuyedao used by Yihetuan
