= Changdao =

Chinese two-handed single-edged sword

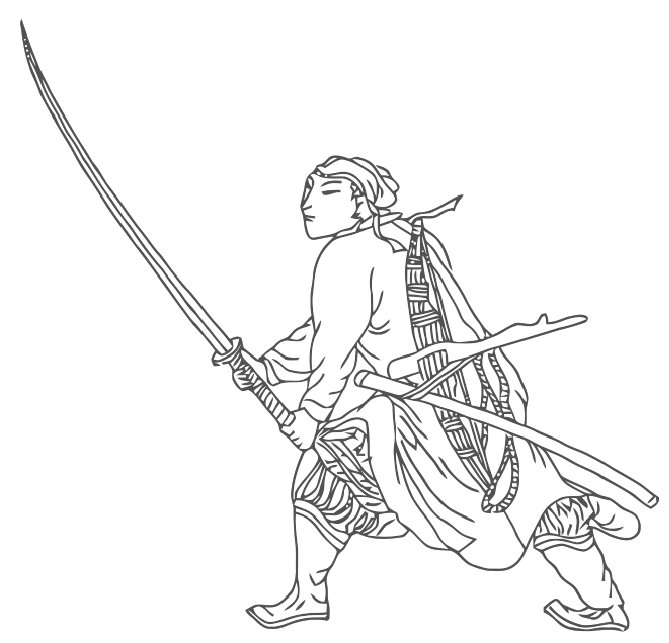
Changdao

The changdao (traditional Chinese: 長刀; simplified Chinese: 长刀; pinyin: chángdāo; lit. 'long sword') was a two-handed, single-edged Chinese sword. The term changdao has been translated as "long saber," "saber-staff," or "long-handled saber." During the Ming dynasty, changdao was often used as a general term for two-handed swords and was used in the frequent raids along the coast. After Republican Era, the term miaodao is sometimes used to describe changdao due to similarity. Tang dynasty sources describe the changdao as being identical to the modao (Chinese: 陌刀), but the modao may have been a double-edged weapon like earlier zhanmajian.

The changdao seems to have first appeared during the Tang dynasty as the preferred weapon choice for elite vanguard infantry units in the Tang army. It was described as having an overall length of seven feet, composed of a three-foot-long single-edged blade and a four-foot-long pole grip. Due to its considerable length and size, it became one of the hallmarks of elite Tang infantry and was often placed at the front of the army as spearheads against enemy formations. The Taibai Yinjing states:

In one army, there are 12,500 officers and men. Ten thousand men in eight sections bearing peidao; two thousand five hundred men in two sections with modao.

This version of the changdao seems to have lost favor after the Tang dynasty. The changdao reappeared again during the Ming dynasty as a general term for two-handed single-edged swords. It was viewed very positively as an effective weapon by Qi Jiguang, who acquired a Kage-ryū (Aizu) manual from Japanese wokou, studied it, and modified it for his troops and used its tactics against enemies on the Mongol border c. 1560. Qi specified a sword length of 1.95 m (6 ft 5 in), similar to the Japanese ōdachi. Its handle was long and slightly more than one-third of its total length, and its curve shallower than Japanese swords. Commanding up to 100,000 troops on the Mongol border, General Qi found the changdao so effective that up to forty percent of his commandos carried it; it stayed in service throughout the late Ming dynasty. The changdao is often compared to the Japanese ōdachi or nagamaki which bear close resemblances and similarities to it.

== See also ==
- Miaodao
- Ōdachi
- Wodao
- Zhanmadao
