= Dao (Chinese sword) =

Single-edged Chinese sword primarily used for slashing and chopping

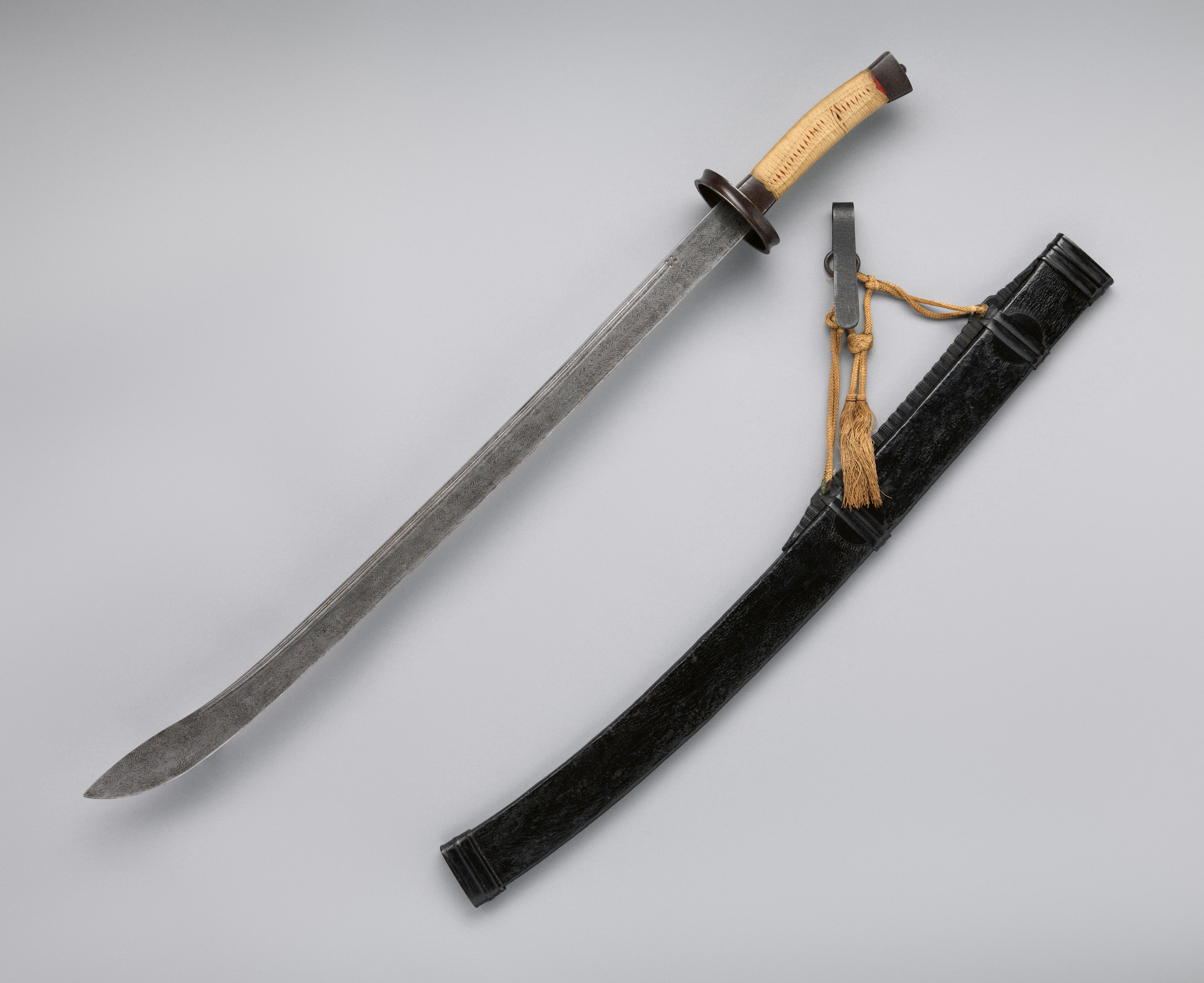
- A Chinese dao and scabbard of the 18th century
- Chinese: 刀
- Literal meaning: (single-edged) sword weapon with a single-edged blade knife
Transcriptions
Standard Mandarin
- Hanyu Pinyin: dāo
- Wade–Giles: tao^{1}
- IPA: [táʊ]
Yue: Cantonese
- Yale Romanization: dou1
- IPA: [tɔw˥]

Dao (pronunciation: [táʊ], English approximation: /daʊ/ dow, Chinese: 刀; pinyin: dāo; jyutping: dou1) are single-edged Chinese swords, primarily used for slashing and chopping. They can be straight or curved. The most common form is also known as the Chinese sabre, although those with wider blades are sometimes referred to as Chinese broadswords. In China, the dao is considered one of the four traditional weapons, along with the gun (stick or staff), qiang (spear), and the jian (double-edged sword), called in this group "The General of Weapons".

== Name ==
In Chinese, the word 刀 can be applied to any weapon with a single-edged blade and usually refers to knives. Because of this, the term is sometimes translated as knife or sword-knife. Nonetheless, within Chinese martial arts and in military contexts, the larger "sword" versions of the dao are usually intended.

== General characteristics ==
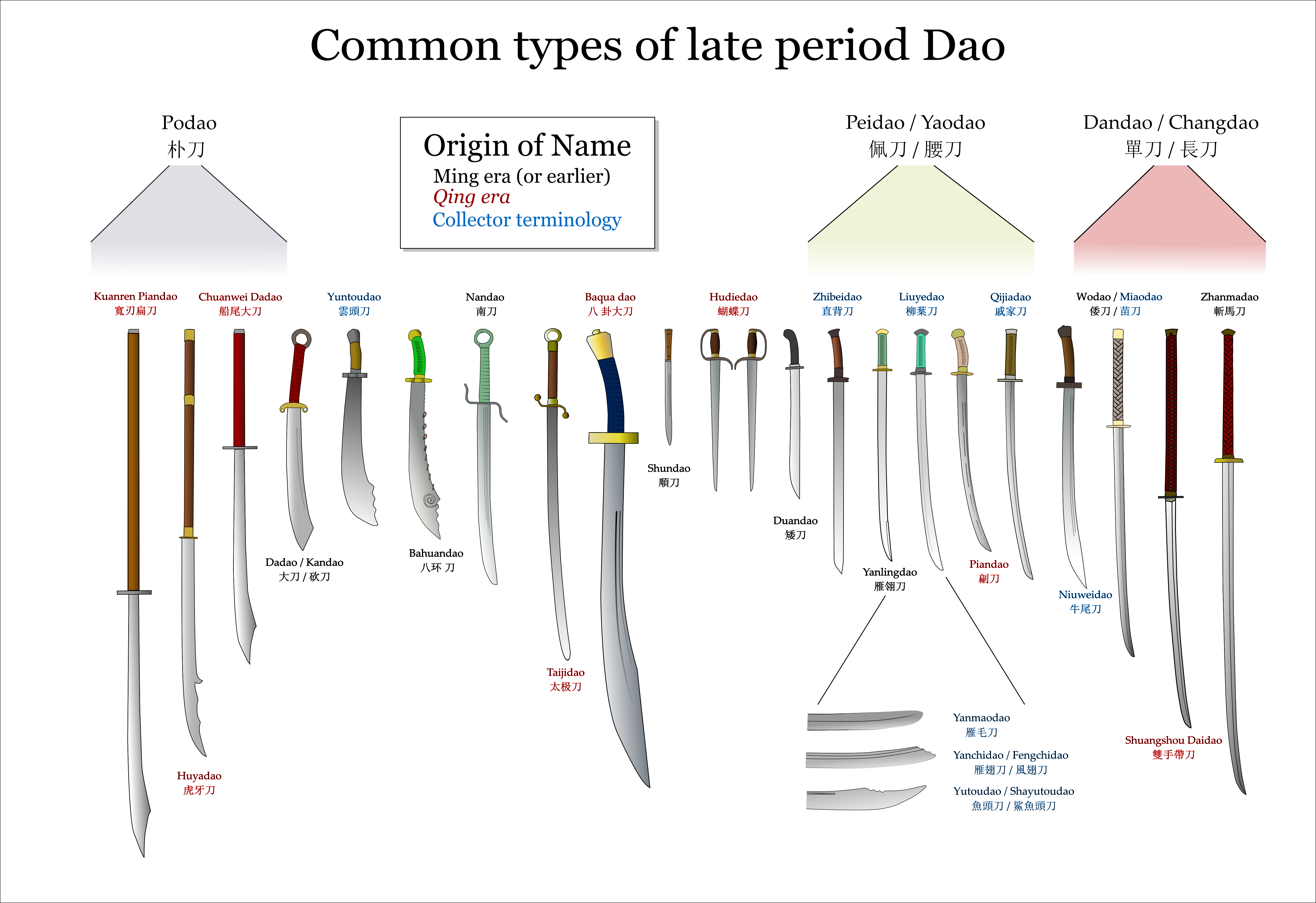
Types of dao

While the dao have varied greatly over the centuries, most single-handed dao of the Ming period and later, and the modern swords based on them, share several characteristics. Dao blades are moderately curved and single-edged, though often with a few inches of the back edge sharpened; the moderate curve allows them to be reasonably effective in the thrust. Hilts are sometimes canted, curving in the opposite direction of the blade, which improves handling in some forms of cuts and thrusts. The cord is usually wrapped over the wood of the handle. Hilts may also be pierced like those of jian (straight-bladed Chinese sword) for the addition of lanyards. However, modern swords for performances will often have tassels or scarves instead. Guards are typically disc-shaped and often cupped. This was to prevent rainwater from getting into the sheath and blood dripping down to the handle, making it more difficult to grip. Sometimes guards are thinner pieces of metal with an s-curve, the lower limb of the curve protecting the user's knuckles; very rarely, they may have guards like those of the jian.

Other variations to the basic pattern include the large bagua dao and the long-handled pudao.

== Early history ==
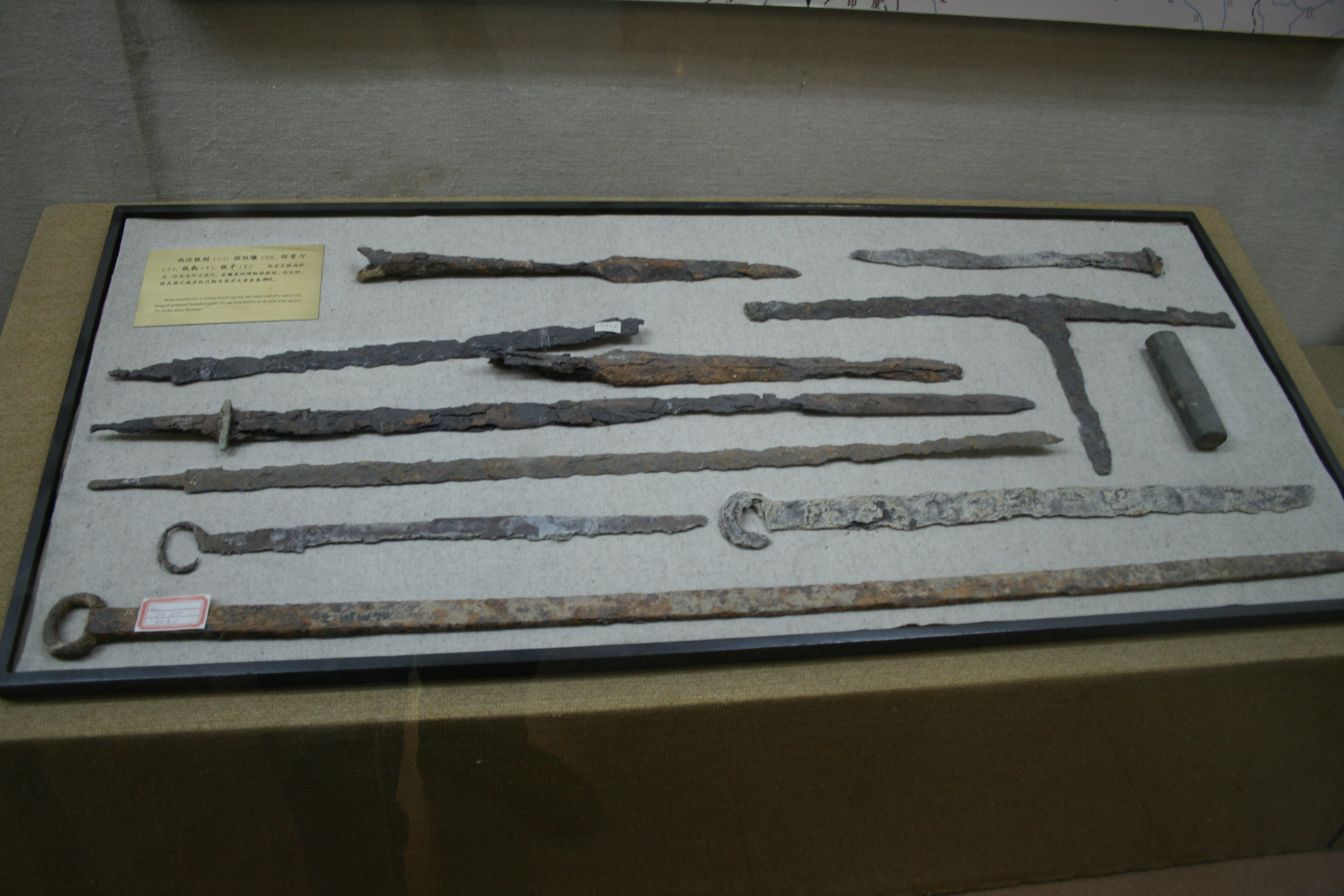
Han dynasty steel ring-headed dao of different sizes (bottom).

A long Han Dynasty ring-headed dao possibly used by cavalry

The earliest dao date from the Shang dynasty in China's Bronze Age, and are known as zhibeidao (直背刀) – straight-backed knives. As the name implies, these were straight-bladed or slightly curved weapons with a single edge. Originally bronze, these weapons were made of iron or steel by the time of the late Warring States period as metallurgical knowledge became sufficiently advanced to control the carbon content. Originally less common as a military weapon than the jian – the straight, double-edged blade of China – the dao became popular with cavalry during the Han dynasty due to its sturdiness, superiority as a chopping weapon, and relative ease of use – it was generally said that it takes a week to attain competence with a dao/saber, a month to attain competence with a qiang/spear, and a year to attain competence with a jian/straight sword. Soon after dao began to be issued to infantry, beginning the replacement of the jian as a standard-issue weapon. Late Han dynasty dao had round grips and ring-shaped pommels, and ranged between 85 and 114 centimeters in length. These weapons were used alongside rectangular shields.

By the end of the Three Kingdoms period, the single-edged dao had almost completely replaced the jian on the battlefield. The jian subsequently became known as a weapon of self-defense for the scholarly aristocratic class, worn as part of court dress.

== Sui, Tang, and Song dynasties ==
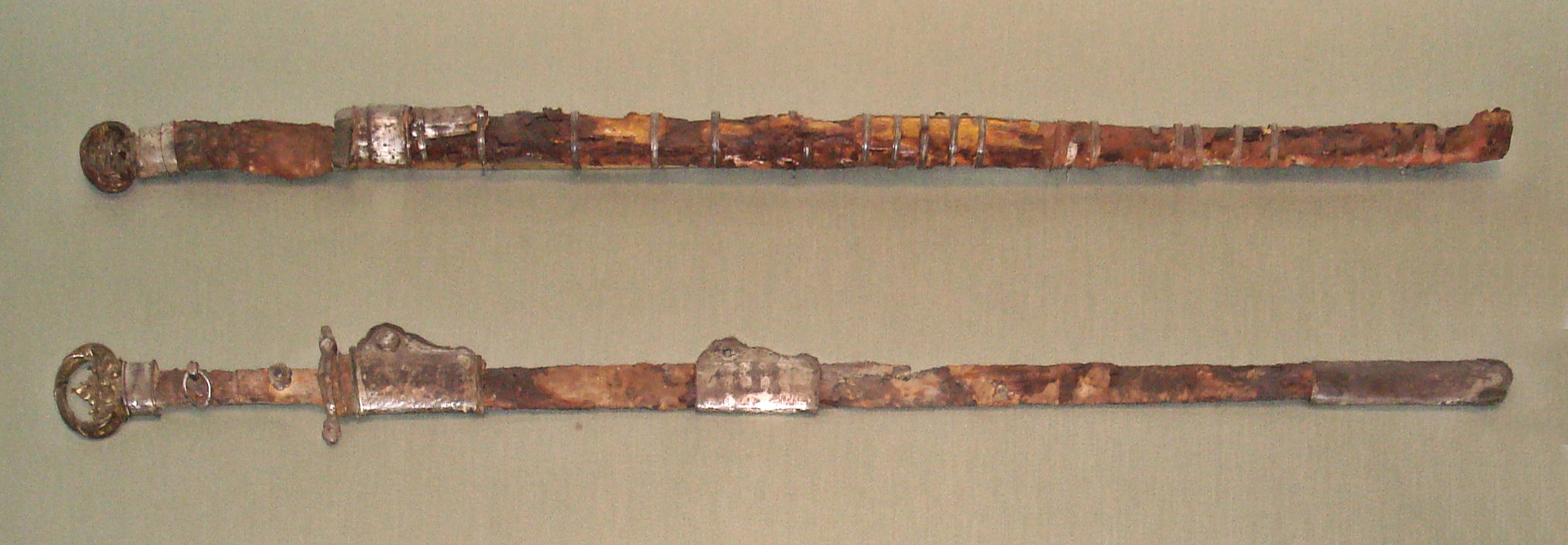
Two Sui dynasty zhibeidao with ring-shaped pommels.

As in the preceding dynasties, Tang dynasty dao were straight along the entire length of the blade. Single-handed peidao ("belt dao") were the most common sidearm in the Tang dynasty. These became known as hengdao ("horizontal dao" or "cross dao") from the preceding Sui dynasty onward. Two-handed changdao ("long dao") or modao were also used in the Tang, with some units specializing in their use.

During the Song dynasty, one form of infantry dao was the shoudao, a chopping weapon with a clip point. While some illustrations show them as straight, the 11th century Song military encyclopedia the Wujing Zongyao depicts them with curved blades – possibly an influence from the steppe tribes of Central Asia, who would conquer parts of China during the Song period. Also dating from the Song are the falchion-like dadao, the long, two-handed zhanmadao, and the long-handled, similarly two-handed buzhandao (步戰刀).

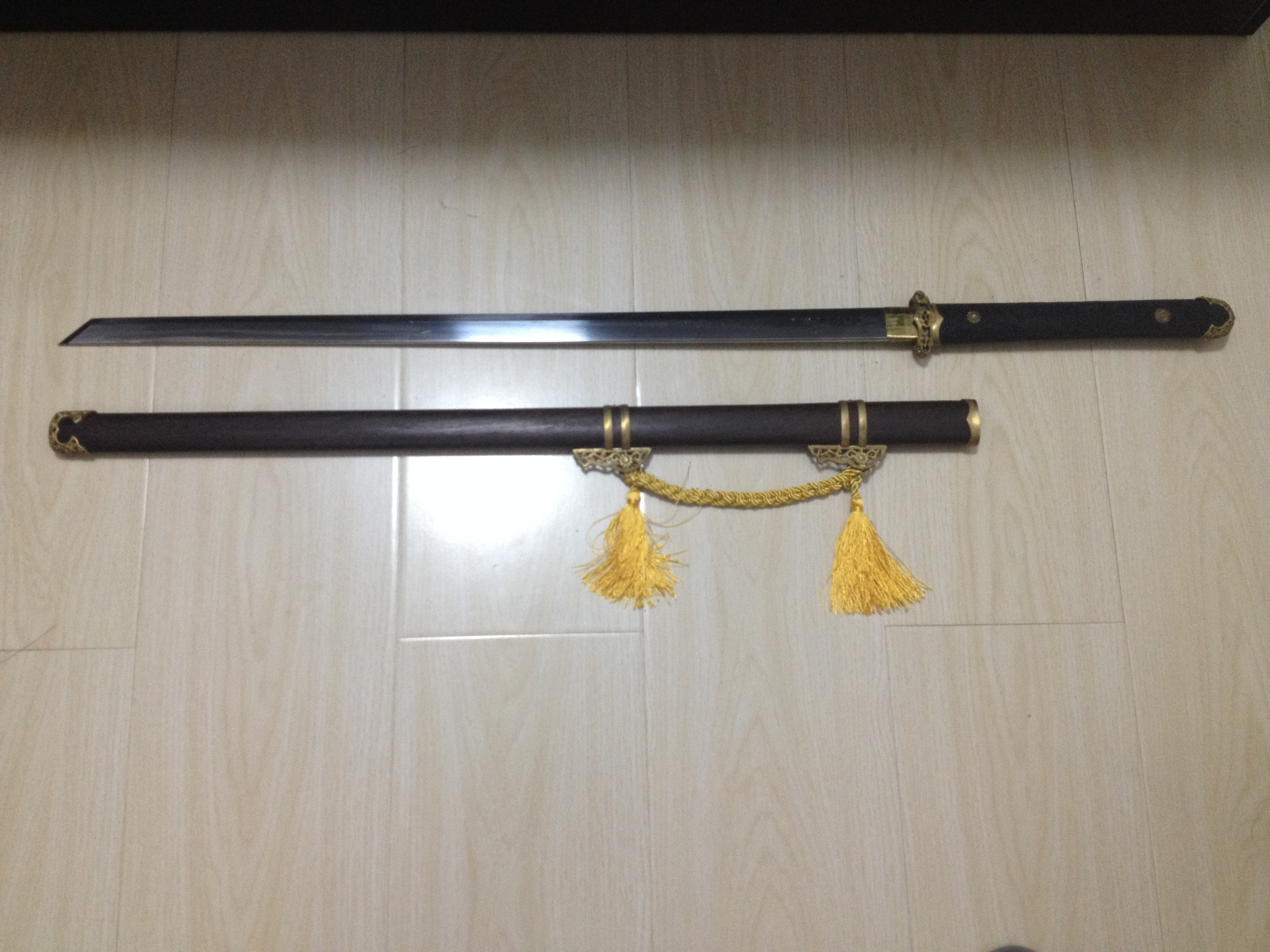
Reconstruction of a Tang dynasty ''dao''.

== Yuan, Ming and Qing dynasties ==
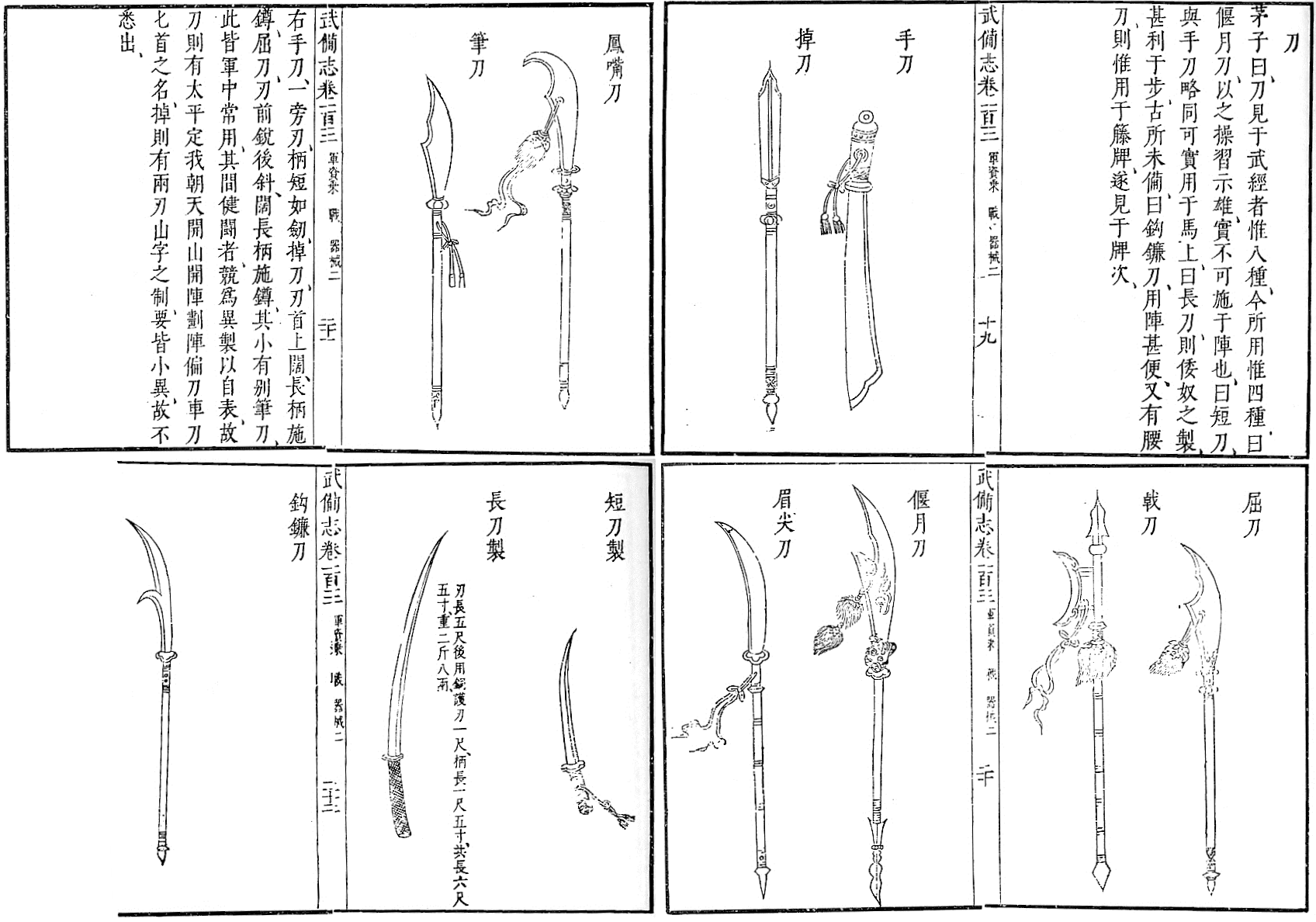
Swords and polearms as depicted in the Wubei Zhi, including dao.

With the Mongol invasion of China in the early 13th century and the formation of the Yuan dynasty, the curved steppe saber became a greater influence on Chinese sword designs. Sabers had been used by Turkic, Tungusic, and other steppe peoples of Central Asia since at least the 8th century CE. It was a favored weapon among the Mongol aristocracy. Its effectiveness for mounted warfare and popularity among soldiers throughout the Mongol empire had lasting effects.

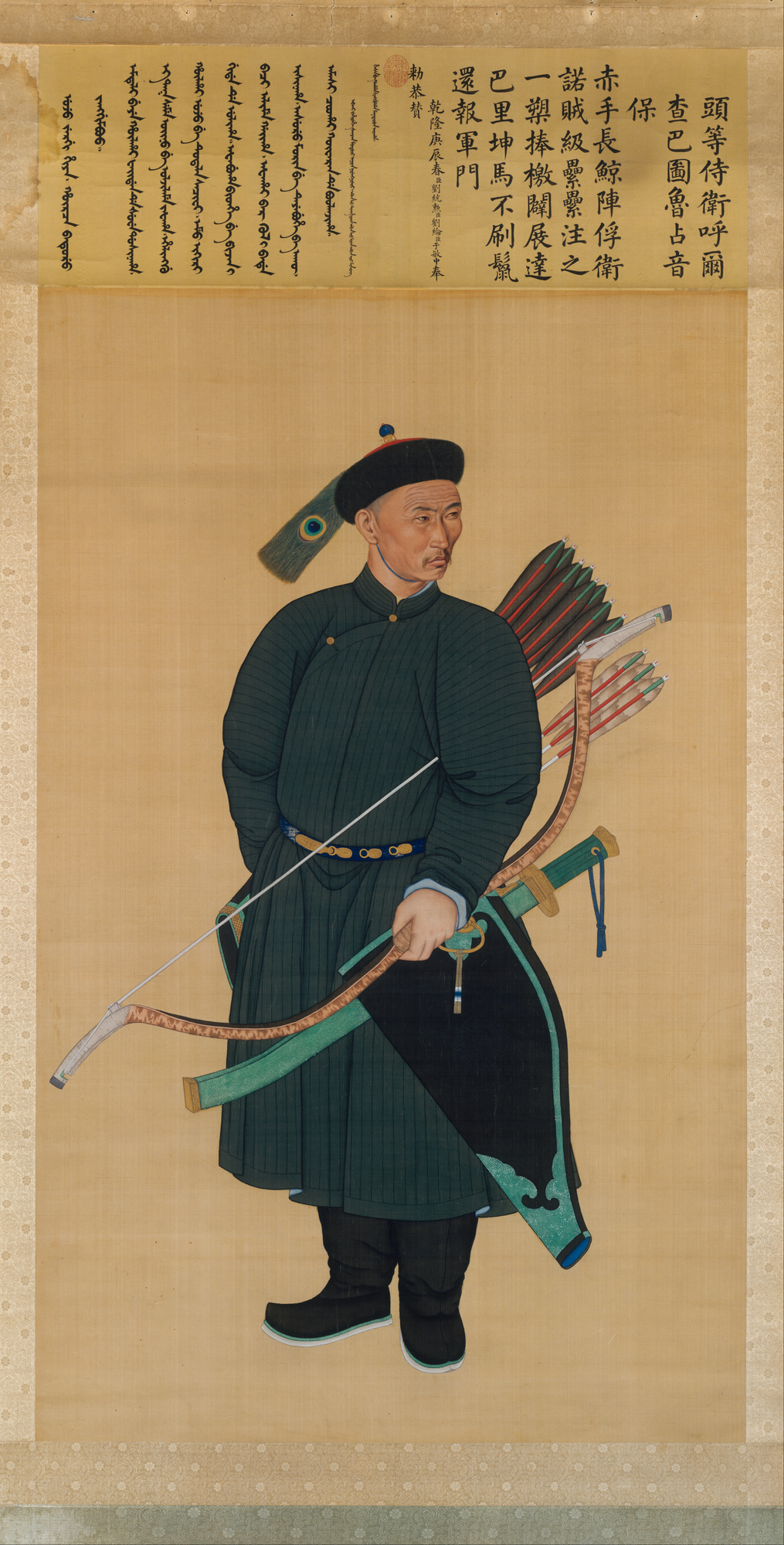
Zhanyinbao, an Imperial bodyguard, wearing a sheathed dao. Notice the lanyard through the handle. (1760)

In China, Mongol influence lasted long after the collapse of the Yuan dynasty at the hands of the Ming, continuing through both the Ming and the Qing dynasties, furthering the popularity of the dao and spawning a variety of new blades. Blades with greater curvature became popular, and these new styles are collectively referred to as peidao (佩刀). (Note: Literal translation:"Worn-Sabre" or "Carried-Sabre". This is a generic term in Chinese referring to all sabres worn on belt or waist, not merely to denote Turko-Mongol sabers and other curved swords.) During the mid-Ming, these new sabers would completely replace the jian as a military-issue weapon. The four main types of peidao are:

=== Yanmaodao ===
The yanmaodao or "goose-quill saber" is largely straight like the earlier zhibeidao, with a curve appearing at the center of percussion near the blade's tip. This allows for thrusting attacks and overall handling similar to that of the jian while preserving much of the dao's strengths in cutting and slashing.

=== Liuyedao ===
The liuyedao or "willow leaf saber" is the most common form of Chinese saber. It first appeared during the Ming dynasty and features a moderate curve along the length of the blade. This weapon became the standard sidearm for cavalry and infantry, replacing the yanmaodao, and is the sort of saber used by many schools of Chinese martial arts.

=== Piandao ===
The piandao or "slashing saber" is a deeply curved dao meant for slashing and draw-cutting. This weapon bears a strong resemblance to the shamshir and scimitar. Skirmishers generally used it in conjunction with a shield.

=== Niuweidao ===
The niuweidao or "oxtail saber" is a heavy-bladed weapon with a characteristic flaring tip. It is the archetypal "Chinese broadsword" of kung fu movies today. It was first recorded in the early 19th century (the latter half of the Qing dynasty) and only as a civilian weapon: there is no record of it being issued to troops, and it does not appear in any listing of official weaponry. Its appearance in movies and modern literature is thus often anachronistic.

=== Other types ===
Besides these four major types of dao, the duandao or "short dao" was also used, this being a compact weapon generally in the shape of a liuyedao. The dadao saw continued use, and during the Ming dynasty the large two-handed changdao and zhanmadao were used both against the cavalry of the northern steppes and the wokou (pirates) of the southeast coast; these latter weapons (sometimes under different names) would continue to see limited use during the Qing period. Also, during the Qing, there appeared weapons such as the nandao, regional variants in the name or shape of some of the above dao, and more obscure variants such as the "nine ringed broadsword", these last likely invented for street demonstrations and theatrical performances rather than for use as weapons. The word dao is also used in the names of several polearms that feature a single-edged blade, such as the pudao and guandao.

The Chinese spear and dao (liuyedao and yanmaodao) were commonly issued to infantry due to the expense of and relatively greater amount of training required for the effective use of the Chinese straight sword, or jian. Dao can often be depicted in period artwork worn by officers and infantry.

During the Yuan dynasty and after, some aesthetic features of Persian, Indian, and Turkish swords would appear on dao. These could include intricate carvings on the blade and "rolling pearls": small metal balls that would roll along fuller-like grooves in the blade.

== Contemporary history ==
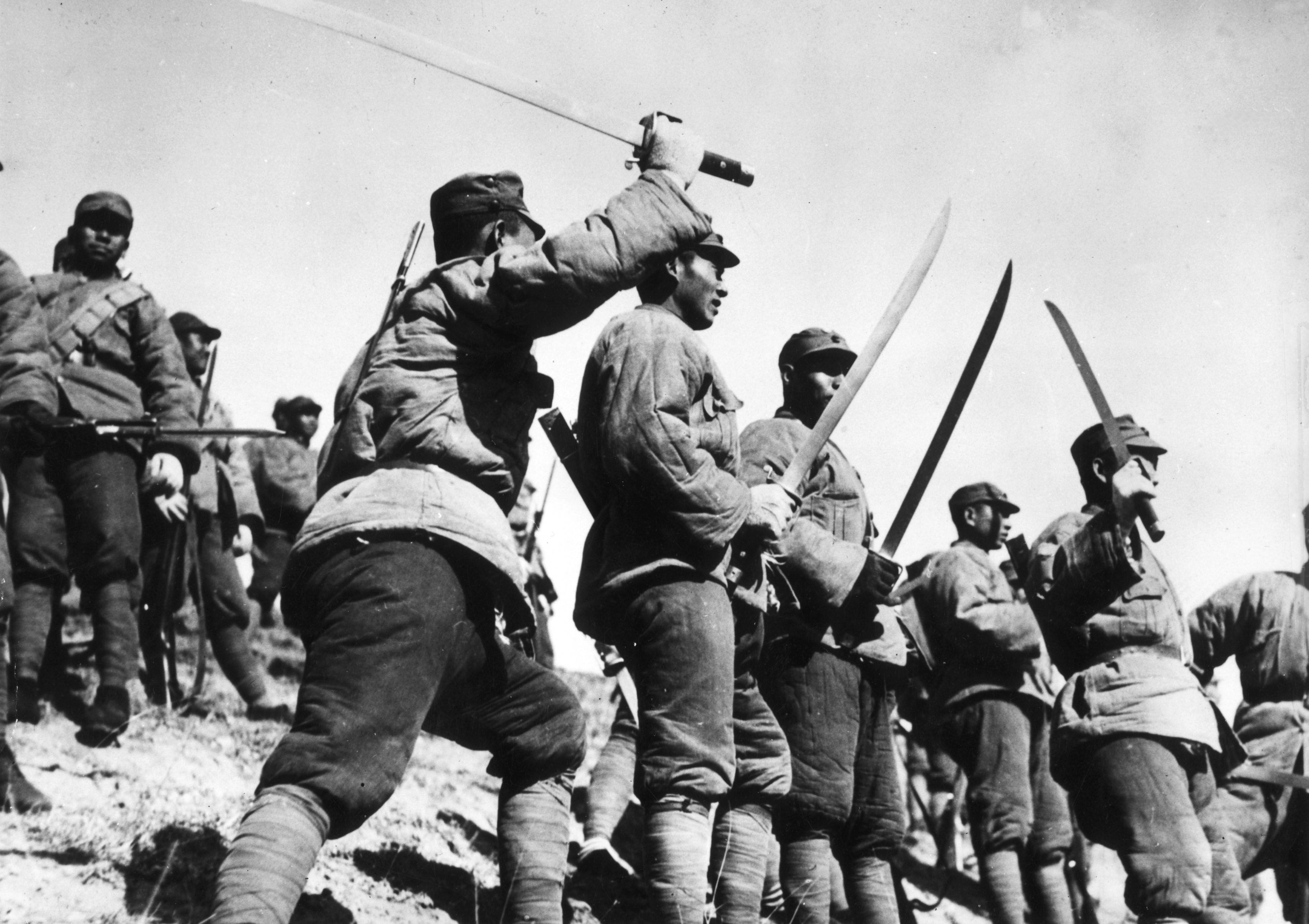
Chinese soldiers from a "Big Sword Unit" during the Japanese attack of Rehe Province, China, 1933

The dadao was used by some Chinese militia units against Japanese invaders during the Second Sino-Japanese War, occasioning "The Sword March". The miaodao, a descendant of the changdao, also saw use.

=== Nandao ===
The nandao or "southern broadsword" is a modern innovation used for contemporary wushu practice.

== In modern wushu ==
Daoshu (simplified Chinese: 刀术; traditional Chinese: 刀術; pinyin: Dāo shù; lit. 'Broadsword Play') refers to the competitive event in modern wushu taolu where athletes utilize a dao in a routine. It was one of the four main weapon events implemented at the 1st World Wushu Championships due to its general popularity.

=== Apparatus ===
The dao itself consists of a thin blade that makes noise when stabbing or cutting techniques are used. Over time, the edge has become more flimsy to create more noise, and the sword has become lighter to allow for faster handling. The only exception to this trend was in 1997 when the Chinese Wushu Association for one year required all swords to have a stiff blade in domestic competition.

In older generations of modern wushu, broadsword flags were generally large, but over the years they have greatly reduced in size to allow for more speed and clarity of the movements.

As of the 2024 IWUF rules, broadsword blades should be no shorter than the top of a competitor's ear if held vertically beside the body with the left hand. The flag must also be no shorter than 30 centimeters.

=== Routines ===
As of the 2024 IWUF rules, daoshu routines must be between 1 minute 20 seconds to 1 minute 35 seconds in length. Daoshu routines are also required to have the following techniques:

Sword techniques

- Chán Tóu (缠头) – Broadsword Twining
- Guǒ Nǎo (裹脑) – Wrapping with the Broadsword
- Pī Dāo (劈刀) – Broadsword Chop
- Zhā Dāo (扎刀) – Broadsword Thrust
- Zhǎn Dāo (斩刀) – Broadsword Hack
- Guà Dāo (挂刀) – Broadsword Hooking Parry
- Yún Dāo (云刀) – Broadsword Cloud Waving
- Bèi Huā Dāo (背花刀) – Broadsword Wrist Figure 8 Behind the Back

Stances

- Gōng Bù (弓步) – Bow Stance
- Mǎ Bù (马步) – Horse Stance
- Pū Bù (仆步) – Drop Stance
- Xū Bù (虚步) – Empty Stance
- Xiē Bù (歇步) – Cross-Legged Crouching Stance

=== Scoring criteria ===
Daoshu adheres to the same deduction content (A score) and degree of difficulty content and connections (C score) as changquan, gunshu, jianshu, and qiangshu. This three-score system has been in place since the 2005 IWUF rules revision. Only the techniques Chán Tóu (缠头) and Guǒ Nǎo (裹脑) have deduction content (code 62).

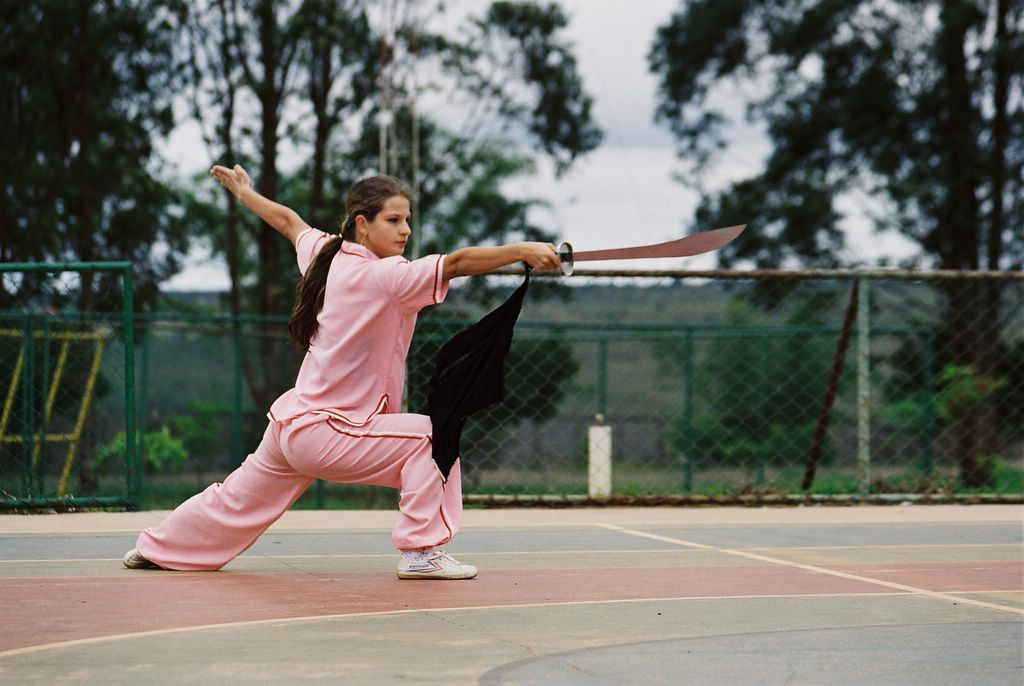
A dao as seen in modern wushu

== General and cited references ==
- Graff, David A. (2002), Medieval Chinese Warfare, 300–900, London: Routledge, ISBN 0-415-23955-9
- Grancsay, Stephen (1930), "Two Chinese Swords", The Metropolitan Museum of Art Bulletin, 25 (9): 194–196, doi:10.2307/3255712, JSTOR 3255712
- Hanson, Chris (2004), The Mongol Siege of Xiangyang and Fan-ch'eng and the Song military
- Lorge, Peter A. (2011), Chinese Martial Arts: From Antiquity to the Twenty-First Century, Cambridge: Cambridge University Press, ISBN 978-0-521-87881-4
- Tom, Philip M. W. (2001), "Some Notable Sabers of the Qing Dynasty at the Metropolitan Museum of Art", Metropolitan Museum Journal, 36: 11, 207–222, doi:10.2307/1513063, JSTOR 1513063, S2CID 191359442
- Tom, Philip M. W.; Rodell, Scott M. (February 2005), "An Introduction to Chinese Single-Edged Hilt Weapons (Dao) and Their Use in the Ming and Qing Dynasties", Kung Fu Tai Chi: 76–85
- Werner, E. T. C. (1989), Chinese Weapons, Singapore: Graham Brash, ISBN 9971-4-9116-8
