= Kung Fu Panda (disambiguation) =

Kung Fu Panda is a media franchise produced by DreamWorks Animation.

Kung Fu Panda may also refer to:

- Kung Fu Panda (film)
  - Kung Fu Panda 2, the 2nd film in the franchise
  - Kung Fu Panda 3, the 3rd film in the franchise
  - Kung Fu Panda 4, the 4th film in the franchise
- Kung Fu Panda (video game)
  - Kung Fu Panda 2 (video game)
- Kung Fu Panda (soundtrack)
  - Kung Fu Panda 2 (soundtrack)
  - Kung Fu Panda 3 (soundtrack)
  - Kung Fu Panda 4 (soundtrack)

== See also ==
- Kung Fu (disambiguation)
- Pablo Sandoval, a Venezuelan baseball player nicknamed "Kung Fu Panda"
