= William Vo =

American wushu practitioner

Personal information
- Born: 2003 (age 22–23) United States

Sport
- Sport: Wushu
- Events: Changquan, Gunshu, Jianshu, Shaolinquan
- Team: US Wushu Team 2022-2027; Zhang Kung Fu
Medal record
Representing United States
Men's Wushu Taolu
Pan American Championships
Gold medal – first place	2022 Brasília	Jianshu
Gold medal – first place	2024 Santa Clara	Jianshu
Gold medal – first place	2024 Santa Clara	Duilian
Gold medal – first place	2026 Buenos Aires	Jiti
Silver medal – second place	2022 Brasília	Changquan
Silver medal – second place	2022 Brasília	Shuangdao
Silver medal – second place	2024 Santa Clara	Changquan
Bronze medal – third place	2024 Santa Clara	Qiangshu
Bronze medal – third place	2026 Buenos Aires	Qiangshu
World Kungfu Championships
Silver medal – second place	2019 Emeishan	Shaolinquan
Silver medal – second place	2019 Emeishan	Gunshu
Pan American Kungfu Championships
Gold medal – first place	2019 San Jose	Shaolinquan
Bronze medal – third place	2019 San Jose	Gunshu

William Vo is an American wushu taolu athlete.

== Career ==
Vo practiced wushu at the Zhang Kung Fu Institute in Union City, California. In 2019, he won two silver medals in Shaolinquan and Gunshu at the World Kungfu Championships. He then competed in the 2019 Pan American Kung Fu and Taijiquan Championships, where he won the gold medal in shaolinquan and the bronze medal in gunshu.

In 2021, Vo began studying at the University of California, Los Angeles and joined the UCLA Wushu Team. A year later, he became a member of the United States national wushu team. At the 2022 Pan American Wushu Championships, he won a gold medal in jianshu, and two silver medals in changquan and shuangdao. Two years later at the 2024 Pan American Wushu Championships, he won two gold medals in jianshu and duilian with Sen Gao, one silver in changquan, and a bronze in qiangshu. Also in the same year, he was the men's individual overall champion at the Collegiate Wushu Tournament. Two years later at the 2026 Pan American Wushu Championships, he won the bronze medal in qiangshu and a gold medal in jiti (groupset).
