= World Jianshu League =

Organization for traditional Chinese sword art preservation

The World Jianshu League (WJL, from Chinese jiàn shù 劍 術, "swordsmanship") is an organization dedicated to preserving the art of the jian, a traditional Chinese sword, through organized competition, discussion, and documentation. The WJL consists of a growing number of wushu schools primarily situated in the United States. The league's main focus is to introduce a new form of sport competition using the jian, similar to sport fencing, or kendo, and thereby preserve, revive, and advance such jianshu concepts as can only be gained through one-on-one competition.

== Background ==
The practice of jianshu in modern times has declined because its traditional military and self-defence functions have been taken over by the invention of firearms and other modern military technology, and because it requires considerable practice and skill in order to wield correctly, and there are now few masters qualified to teach it. Many traditional martial arts from nations other than China have experienced similar declines and have found different ways to maintain popularity, one being through developing similar activities in the form of a sport (e.g. kenjutsu or iajitsu into kendo or iaido, Hellenistic or Traditional European unarmed combat into boxing and wrestling, European swordplay into competitive fencing).

The modern Chinese based sport named wushu was established for similar reasons in regard to traditional Chinese martial arts. However, in modern wushu competitions officially held by the International Wushu Federation, there are no one-on-one type jianshu matches, only performances. Consequently, many practical skills in jianshu that deal with an opponent have become rare even among wushu practitioners. In light of this, the recently established World Jianshu League seeks to promote the art of jianshu through establishing jianshu sport competition. However, as pointed out by critics of kendo, sport fencing, and unarmed combat competitions, such as the UFC, conversion of a martial art to athletic competition can bring with it misconceptions about, and deviations from, the original, practical martial art. This can lead to techniques, tactics, and entire concepts, which would be unfavorable, and even foolish, in a more realistic confrontation. Therefore, another of the goals of the WJL has been to develop a competitive environment that is not only safe, but one that is also conducive to preserving the original martial concepts of jianshu.

== The CS Jian ==
An adaptation that the World Jianshu League has made in its promotion of its standardized jian training is the introduction of its "CS jian". The CS jian is made from a blend of polymers that make it both durable and flexible. It was designed to be as close to a traditional metal jian as the materials make possible, while still retaining the safety advantages of a practice sword made of a softer, lighter material than steel. They are promoted as an improvement over the wooden practice jians that have been used traditionally, since wooden jian vary greatly in quality and balance, and are not as flexible.

== Documentation ==
The WJL also has a growing collection of resources related to jianshu education, the most popular being their instructional videos, available on YouTube. Other resources are their BBS forum, where students of the art can discuss and share ideas and concepts, their member videos, where basic techniques and recorded sparring matches can be viewed, and their community network, where people can connect with various participating groups around the world.

=== See also ===
- List of Chinese martial arts
- Wushu (term), Wushu (sport)
- Kung fu (disambiguation)
- Eighteen Arms of Wushu
