= 工夫 =

工夫 is an East Asian word.

It may refer to:

- Gongfu, making with skill
  - Gongfu tea (工夫茶), traditional Chinese tea
- Kufū, device
  - kufū geiko (工夫稽古), learning and keeping in mind the details of the technique and spiritual effort to realize it
- 공부, study in Korean
  - Master of Study, South Korean television series

== See also ==
- Kung fu (disambiguation)
