= 2022 Pan American Wushu Championships =

13th edition of the Pan American Wushu Championships

- Venue: AABB Sports Gymnasium
- Location: Brasília, Brazil
- Start date: July 21, 2022
- End date: July 25, 2022

The 2022 Pan American Wushu Championships was the 13th edition of the Pan American Wushu Championships. It was held in Brasília, Brazil in July 21–25, 2022. It ran adjacent to the Pan American Junior Wushu Championships.

== Medal table ==
* Host nation (Brazil)

Rank	Nation	Gold	Silver	Bronze	Total
1	Brazil (BRA)*	18	10	5	33
2	United States (USA)	10	10	6	26
3	Mexico (MEX)	3	7	8	18
4	Canada (CAN)	3	1	1	5
5	Dominican Republic (DOM)	2	0	5	7
6	Chile (CHI)	1	2	0	3
7	Argentina (ARG)	1	1	2	4
8	Bolivia (BOL)	1	1	0	2
9	Colombia (COL)	0	1	1	2
Totals (9 entries)		39	33	28	100

== Medalists ==
=== Taolu ===
==== Men ====
Event	Gold	Silver	Bronze
Changquan	Sen Gao; United States	William Vo; United States	Éverson Felipe Pereira da Silva; Brazil
Daoshu	Sen Gao; United States	Éverson Felipe Pereira da Silva; Brazil	Caio Fernandes Martines; Brazil
Gunshu	Mateus Corsino da Cunha; Brazil	Auston Ng; Canada	Preston Land; United States
Jianshu	William Vo; United States	Marcio de Oliveira Coutinho; Brazil	Paco Huang; Canada
Qiangshu	Paco Huang; Canada	Iván Aviña Méndez; Mexico	Johar David López Díaz; Mexico
Nanquan	Rafael Viana dos Santos; Brazil	Jimmy Zhu; United States	Gabriel Komaziro Nakamura; Brazil
Nandao	Gabriel Komaziro Nakamura; Brazil	Jimmy Zhu; United States	Ronaldo Rangel Rubio; Mexico
Nangun	Gabriel Komaziro Nakamura; Brazil	Rafael Viana dos Santos; Brazil	Bryan Kao; United States
Taijiquan	Murray Cheung; Canada	Omar Aviña Méndez; Mexico	none awarded
Taijijian	Murray Cheung; Canada	Omar Aviña Méndez; Mexico	none awarded
Xingyiquan	Alfonso Bravo Chelen; Chile	Sergio Minoru Tanoshi; Brazil	Javier Arturo Lira Luna; Mexico
Shuangdao	Caio Fernandes Martines; Brazil	William Vo; United States	Javier Arturo Lira Luna; Mexico
Duilian	United States; Sen Gao; Bryan Kao	none awarded	none awarded

==== Women ====
Event	Gold	Silver	Bronze
Changquan	Kaika Kusuma; United States	Stephanie Lim; United States	Michele Silva dos Santos; Brazil
Daoshu	Angela Flavia Ximenes da Silva; Brazil	Charisse Hung; United States	Alexa Fernanda Cruz Gómez; Mexico
Gunshu	Stephanie Lim; United States	Charisse Hung; United States	Alexa Fernanda Cruz Gómez; Mexico
Jianshu	Kaika Kusuma; United States	Michele Silva dos Santos; Brazil	Stephanie Lim; United States
Qiangshu	Kaika Kusuma; United States	Brenda Porfirio da Silva; Brazil	Ellen Cecilia dos Santos; Brazil
Taijiquan	Maya Melisa Huanacuni Baldivieso; Bolivia	Wara Adriana Laure Huanacuni; Bolivia	none awarded
Baguazhang	Jenny Zheng; United States	Yessenia Medrano Mendoza; Mexico	none awarded
Shuangjian	Brenda Porfirio da Silva; Brazil	Jenny Zheng; United States	Yessenia Medrano Mendoza; Mexico
Duilian	United States; Jenny Zheng; Kaika Kusuma	none awarded	none awarded

=== Sanda ===
==== Men ====
Event	Gold	Silver	Bronze
48 kg	Kelvin Luis Moquete; Dominican Republic	none awarded	none awarded
52 kg	Fernando Antonio Torres Cuevas; Dominican Republic	Levi Ferreira de Souza; Brazil	none awarded
56 kg	Rafael Lima Fontoura; Brazil	Kevin Luis Felicione; Argentina	Jesús Omar Ruíz Ayala; Mexico
56 kg	Rafael Lima Fontoura; Brazil	Kevin Luis Felicione; Argentina	Jeyson Vizcaino Santose; Dominican Republic
60 kg	Gabriel Pedroso de Almeida; Brazil	Amilcar Reyes Hernández; Mexico	Estheling Espinosa Vargas; Dominican Republic
60 kg	Gabriel Pedroso de Almeida; Brazil	Amilcar Reyes Hernández; Mexico	Luis Alberto Ciganda; Argentina
65 kg	Johnathan Souza Prado; Brazil	José Lino Meléndez Gutiérrez; Mexico	Vincent Meng; United States
65 kg	Johnathan Souza Prado; Brazil	José Lino Meléndez Gutiérrez; Mexico	Juan Agustin Simone; Argentina
70 kg	Lucas Luciano Queiroz Pereira; Brazil	Spencer Meng; United States	Albaro Alberto Leyba Peguero; Dominican Republic
70 kg	Lucas Luciano Queiroz Pereira; Brazil	Spencer Meng; United States	Brandon Esteven Tafur Rojas; Colombia
75 kg	João Antonio de Oliveira; Brazil	Ricardo Alexis Gallardo; Mexico	Francisco Alberto Alcala De la Cruz; Dominican Republic
75 kg	João Antonio de Oliveira; Brazil	Ricardo Alexis Gallardo; Mexico	Andrew Tate; United States
80 kg	Kevin Alan Gallardo Onofre; Mexico	Ildson Maicon Conceição da Silva; Brazil	Devon Legget; United States
80 kg	Kevin Alan Gallardo Onofre; Mexico	Ildson Maicon Conceição da Silva; Brazil	Breuley Antonio Nuñez Reynoso; Dominican Republic
85 kg	Enoque Kennedy Fragoso Lopes Ferreira; Brazil	Federico Ricardo Mena Perea; Colombia	none awarded
90 kg	Julian Martin Silva; Argentina	Renato Weslley Bispo Paes; Brazil	none awarded
90 kg+	André Felipe Novaes Pereira; Brazil	Tyler Bristow; United States	none awarded

==== Women ====
Event	Gold	Silver	Bronze
56 kg	Raissa de França Leite; Brazil	none awarded	none awarded
52 kg	Edinea Prado Camargo; Brazil	none awarded	none awarded
56 kg	Beatriz Adrião Rustice Silva; Brazil	none awarded	none awarded
60 kg	Yesenia Guadalupe Gutiérrez Crespo; Mexico	Nathalia Briquezi Silva; Brazil	none awarded
70 kg	María Esperanza Lucatero Núñez; Mexico	none awarded	none awarded
75 kg	Tamires Camila Flausino Gomes; Brazil	none awarded	none awarded
