= Hancock (film) =

2008 film by Peter Berg

- Theatrical release poster
- Directed by: Peter Berg
- Written by: Vy Vincent Ngo; Vince Gilligan
- Produced by: Akiva Goldsman; James Lassiter; Michael Mann; Will Smith
- Starring: Will Smith; Charlize Theron; Jason Bateman; Eddie Marsan
- Cinematography: Tobias Schliessler
- Edited by: Colby Parker Jr.; Paul Rubell
- Music by: John Powell
- Production companies: Columbia Pictures; Relativity Media; Overbrook Entertainment; Weed Road Pictures; Blue Light
- Distributed by: Sony Pictures Releasing
- Release date: July 2, 2008 (United States)
- Running time: 92 minutes
- Country: United States
- Language: English
- Budget: $150 million
- Box office: $629.4 million

Hancock is a 2008 American superhero film starring Will Smith in the titular role as John Hancock, an amnesiac, alcoholic, reckless superhuman trying to remember his past. The film was directed by Peter Berg and written by Vince Gilligan and Vy Vincent Ngo. The film also stars Charlize Theron, Jason Bateman and Eddie Marsan.

The story was originally written by Vy Vincent Ngo in 1996. It languished in development hell for years with various directors attached, including Tony Scott, Michael Mann (who would later co-produce the film), Jonathan Mostow, and Gabriele Muccino, before being filmed in mid-2007 in Los Angeles with a production budget of $150 million.

In the United States, the film was rated PG-13 by the Motion Picture Association of America after changes were made at their request in order to avoid an R rating, which it had received twice before. Columbia Pictures released the film in theaters in the United States on July 2, 2008. While Hancock received mixed reviews from critics, who found it promising, but let down by the mid-movie change in tone, it grossed $629.4 million worldwide, becoming the fourth highest-grossing film of 2008.

== Plot ==
John Hancock is an alcoholic, reckless, superhuman imbued with flight, invulnerability, and super-strength. Acting as a haphazard, unrefined superhero in Los Angeles, he is shunned, ridiculed, and hated by the public due to his drunken, careless crime-fighting and rude, unpleasant disposition.

Hancock rescues Ray Embrey, a community-minded but struggling public relations specialist, from an oncoming train, but also accidentally derails it in the process. In gratitude, Ray offers to help improve Hancock's public image and hopes that he will be the spokesperson for his charitable brand, "All Heart". Hancock meets Ray's family, his son Aaron, and his wife Mary, who is suspicious of him. Ray encourages Hancock to issue a public apology and surrender to local authorities, hoping it will build public confidence in Hancock and create demand for him to return. Hancock reluctantly agrees and is placed in prison, where he easily fends off attacks from other inmates but struggles to connect with his support groups for alcohol abuse and anger management. Ray visits frequently, encouraging Hancock to be patient, and later Ray's family visits as well, bringing him homemade spaghetti with meatballs, which he loves.

The crime rate in Los Angeles rises, and Hancock is eventually released to help. Sporting a new leather super suit, he successfully rescues a wounded police officer during a bank robbery shootout and hostage situation orchestrated by Kenneth "Red" Parker, ending when Hancock prevents Parker from using a 'dead man's switch' to trigger C-4 explosives by slicing off his hand and turning both over to the police. The public applauds Hancock as a hero, and the officers praise him for ending the crisis without loss of life. Hancock has dinner with Ray and Mary and reveals that he is an amnesiac and immortal, having woken up in a hospital 80 years ago with no memory of his identity. Ray tells Hancock that Mary is Aaron's stepmother and that his biological mother had died in childbirth. Carrying a drunk Ray home, Hancock kisses Mary, who kisses him back but then throws him through the wall, revealing that she also has superpowers.

The next day, Hancock and Mary speak in private. She explains that ancient cultures called them gods or angels (and now superheroes) and that there were more like them in the past; however, their peers inevitably bonded in pairs as soulmates, lost their powers in the process, lived human lives, and eventually died. When Mary refuses to answer questions about their connection, the two begin a brawl that moves through L.A. During the fight, Mary reveals they were together for 3,000 years and are the last of their kind, but they stop when they reach Ray, who confronts them about the secrecy. Hancock leaves and stops a store robbery, but he is shot and finds that a bullet has hurt him. While receiving hospital treatment, Mary explains that the closer they are, the more mortal they become, and they will lose their powers unless they stay apart. The last time Hancock and Mary were together was 80 years ago, when Hancock was attacked (leaving him hospitalized and amnesiac); she fled so that his powers would return.

Parker escapes prison with several inmates and attacks the hospital to get revenge. Mary is caught in the crossfire and injured. Hancock manages to use some of his fading strength to fight and kill the convicts but is injured when Parker shoots him. Ray saves him by cutting off Parker's other hand with a fire axe before killing him. Hancock throws himself out of the hospital, trying to increase his distance from Mary so they can both recover, before flying off.

A month later, Ray and his family get a call from Hancock (now in New York City), revealing that he has imprinted the Moon's surface with Ray's "All Heart" marketing logo. In a mid-credits scene, Hancock confronts a criminal holding a woman at gunpoint and demanding that he help him escape from the police. Hancock shows restraint when dealing with the criminal but does smile when the gunman insults him, indicating that the felon is about to have a bad day.

== Cast ==
- Will Smith as John Hancock, an alcoholic superhero or occasionally a supervillain. Hancock is invulnerable, immortal, possesses superhuman strength, reflexes, and stamina, highly developed regeneration, and can fly at supersonic speeds. He is also an amnesiac; his first memories are of waking up alone in a hospital in 1931. During his release, the duty nurse asked him for his "John Hancock" (i.e., his signature) which he adopted as his current alias. Smith described the character: "Hancock is not your average superhero. Every day he wakes up mad at the world. He doesn't remember what happened to him and there's no one to help him find the answers." To give a realistic appearance of superhero flight, Smith was often suspended by wires 60 feet (18 m) above the ground and propelled at 40–50 miles per hour (64–80 km/h).
- Charlize Theron as Mary Embrey, Ray's wife and Hancock's ex-wife, who also has powers and abilities like him, but they are both becoming weak as they are close to each other. Theron described Mary: "She makes this conscious decision to live in suburbia and be this soccer mom to her stepson and be the perfect wife—she lives in this bubble. But when people do that it usually means they are hiding some characteristic inside themselves that scares them. That is Mary's case. She knows who she is and what she is capable of."
- Jason Bateman as Ray Embrey, a corporate public relations consultant whose life Hancock saves. Bateman said, "My character sees life through rose-colored glasses so he doesn't understand how people can't see the positive side of Hancock. I like being the everyman. I like being the tour guide, the one who tethers whatever absurdity might be in a film and helps make that tangible to the audience."
- Jae Head as Aaron Embrey, Ray's son and Mary's stepson who idolizes Hancock.
- Eddie Marsan as Kenneth "Red" Parker Jr., a bank robber who later becomes Hancock's archnemesis. Having previously filmed the low-budget Happy-Go-Lucky, Marsan found the transition to the big-budget Hancock to be a shock. Marsan said, "I went from being in a car with Sally Hawkins in Happy-Go-Lucky to blowing up a bank in downtown LA."

Actors Johnny Galecki and Thomas Lennon also appear in the film as Mike and Jeremy. Mike Epps makes an uncredited cameo in the mid-credits scene. Film producers Akiva Goldsman and Michael Mann appear as executives listening to Ray's lecture. Television host Nancy Grace also has a cameo appearance. Daeg Faerch appears as Michel, the young French American neighborhood bully who is thrown by Hancock in the air for repeatedly insulting him. Atticus Shaffer, later known for his role in the sitcom The Middle, also makes a brief appearance at the beginning of the film.

== Production ==
=== Development ===
[Vy Vincent Ngo] told me the motivation for [the idea] was that he loved Superman. It inspired him, and he wanted to do a version of Superman that was more real and challenging. He wanted to take the Superman genre and turn it upside down.

— Dustin Nguyen on his reclusive friend's spec script

Vy Vincent Ngo wrote the spec script Tonight, He Comes in 1996. The draft, about a troubled 12-year-old, and a fallen superhero, was initially picked up by director Tony Scott as a potential project. Producer Akiva Goldsman came across the script, which he had considered a favorite, and encouraged Richard Saperstein, then president of development and production at Artisan Entertainment, to acquire it in 2002. Eventually, Artisan placed the project in turnaround, and it was acquired by Goldsman.

Vince Gilligan and John August rewrote Ngo's script. Michael Mann was initially chosen to direct, but he instead opted to write and direct Miami Vice, and Jonathan Mostow was attached as director. Under Mostow's supervision, a ten-page treatment was written to be pitched to Will Smith to portray the lead role in the film. Neither Mostow nor Smith was yet committed to make the project an active priority at the time, and Dave Chappelle was at one point considered for the lead role. The project initially had an R rating until Smith signed on and was toned down to fit the actor's image.

Several studios attempted to finance the film, and Columbia Pictures succeeded in acquiring the project in February 2005. A second draft was scripted by Gilligan, following the finalization of the deal with Columbia. The film was initially slated for a holiday 2006 release. In November 2005, Mostow and Smith committed to Tonight, He Comes, with production slated to begin in Los Angeles in summer 2006.

Smith's salary in his pay or play contract for the film was $20 million and 20 percent of the film's gross. The actor had also set up a pay or play contract to film I Am Legend at Warner Bros. after completion of Tonight, He Comes.

Mostow eventually departed from the project due to creative differences but remained as executive producer. Italian director Gabriele Muccino filled Mostow's vacancy in May 2006. Since Muccino was busy editing The Pursuit of Happyness starring Smith, which Muccino had directed, Smith switched projects to film I Am Legend first for its December 2007 release, and then film Tonight, He Comes afterward.

=== Filming ===
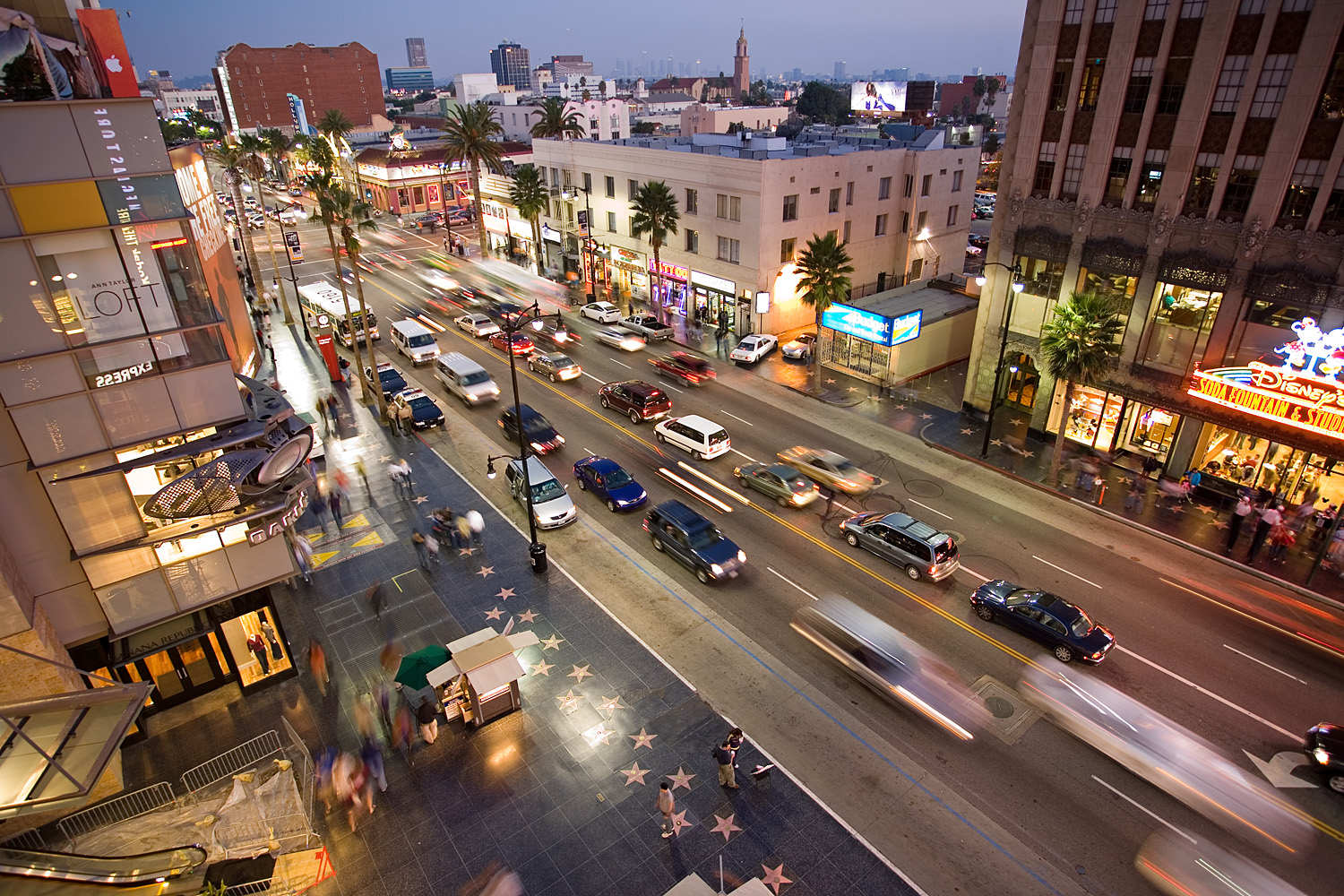
Hollywood Boulevard was one of the film's practical locations.

In October 2006, Peter Berg was attached to direct Tonight, He Comes with production slated to begin in May 2007 in Los Angeles, the story's setting. Berg had been midway through filming The Kingdom when he heard about the film and called Michael Mann, who had become one of its producers. The new director compared the original script's tone to Leaving Las Vegas (1995), calling it "a scathing character study of this suicidal alcoholic superhero". The director explained the rewrite: "We thought the idea was cool, but we did want to lighten it up. We all did." Before filming began, Tonight, He Comes was retitled John Hancock, and it was eventually shortened to Hancock.

Filming began on Hancock on July 3, 2007, in Los Angeles, having a production budget of $150 million. Locations such as Hollywood Boulevard were designed to look damaged, having rubble, overturned vehicles, and fires. Smith's character is also an alcoholic, so for scenes in liquor stores, the art department designed fake labels such as Pap Smear Vodka for the bottles because "brown-bag brands" like Thunderbird and Night Train refused to lend their names. Reshoots were filmed in Times Square in May 2008, the late date resulting in the cancellation of the film's original world premiere in Australia on June 10, 2008.

=== Visual effects ===
Hancock was Peter Berg's first film with visual effects as critical cinematic elements. He considered the computer-generated fight his least favorite part of the film, citing limited control in making the scene successful. According to the director, "Once the fight starts, you're very limited and you're at the mercy of your effects guys ... unless they're really technically oriented ... it's definitely the time we have the least amount of control as directors." He and other filmmakers worked to cut down on the fight scene, believing that the film's success would come from the character study of Smith's character, John Hancock, similar to Robert Downey Jr.'s acclaimed portrayal of Tony Stark in the previous May's superhero release, Iron Man.

Visual effects supervisor Carey Villegas described Peter Berg's photography as "very high energy", to which the visual effects crew had difficulty adapting. Though the crew had estimated developing 300 visual effects shot at its initial bid, the final tally was approximately 525 shots. An unexpected shot was a scene in which Hancock shoves a prisoner's head up another's anus, and filmmakers initially attempted to film it conventionally, using sleight of hand techniques with cameras. Finding that doing so did not capture "the vulgarity of the gag", the crew was enlisted to use computer-generated effects. Visual effects were also applied in conjunction with the film's choreography, incorporating palm trees, twisters, and debris in the computer-generated fight scene and combining visual effects with a crane shot to portray Hancock's derailment of a freight train.

=== Music ===
The film score was composed by John Powell and was performed by the 110-piece orchestra from the Hollywood Studio Symphony under the supervision of conductors Blake Neely, Don Harper and Pete Anthony. Varèse Sarabande released the score album on July 1, 2008.

== Release ==
=== Marketing ===
The New York Times noted that Hancock's original story and controversial subject matter present a stark contrast to "a summerful of sequels and animated sure shots" and represent a gamble for "an increasingly corporate entertainment industry". Hancock had been reviewed by the Motion Picture Association of America (MPAA) twice, and both times received an R rating instead of the makers' preferred PG-13 rating to target broader audiences. Questionable elements for the MPAA included Smith's character drinking in front of a 17-year-old and the character flying under the influence of alcohol. One element that was removed from the film to appeal to the MPAA was statutory rape. With such elements, studio executives only became comfortable with Hancock when the marketing approach focused on action and humor. Berg noted, "The ad campaign for this movie is much friendlier than the film." The MPAA ultimately gave the film a PG-13 rating, citing "some intense sequences of sci-fi action and violence and language".

Hancock was originally titled Tonight, He Comes and later changed to John Hancock before settling on its title. Marketing consultants attempted to persuade Sony Pictures to again change the title Hancock because it was too vague for audiences, suggesting alternatives like Heroes Never Die, Unlikely Hero, and Less Than Hero. Despite the advice, Sony stayed with Hancock and anticipated marketing on the popularity of the film's star, Will Smith.

=== Theatrical run ===
Hancock had its world premiere as the opener at the 30th Moscow International Film Festival on June 18, 2008. To avoid copyright infringement, organizers undertook "unprecedented" steps to prevent illegal reproduction of the film.

For the film, Sony created a digital camera package (DCP) having 4K resolution, containing four times more information than the typical DCP that possessed 2K resolution. Projectors for the higher-resolution package were installed in 200 theaters in the United States with two dozen in evaluation. The impact of the package was debated, with one argument being that the difference would not be noticeable, and the counter-argument being that the higher resolution had future value.

Prior to the film's opening five-day weekend in the United States and Canada, predictions for its weekend performance ranged from as low as $70 million to as high as $125 million. According to CinemaScore, Hancock was given a B+ grade by audiences. The film was shown in advance screenings on July 1, 2008, in 3,680 theaters in the United States and Canada, grossing $6.8 million. The film was widely released on July 2, 2008, expanding to 3,965 theaters. At the conclusion of the five-day weekend, Hancock took top placement at the box office in the United States and Canada, grossing an estimated $107.3 million. The film had the third-biggest opening 4 July weekend after Transformers (2007) and Spider-Man 2 (2004). Hancock was Will Smith's fifth film to open on a 4 July weekend and was his most successful opening to date. The film was also Smith's eighth film in a row to take top placement in the American and Canadian box office and the twelfth film in Smith's career to lead the box office. Hancock was also Peter Berg's strongest opening of his directing career to date.

Outside of the United States and Canada, Hancock grossed $78.3 million in its opening weekend, drawing from 5,444 screenings across 50 markets, ranking it the third highest international opening of 2008 after Indiana Jones and the Kingdom of the Crystal Skull and Iron Man. Hancock averaged $14,382 per screen. It placed on top in 47 of the 50 markets in which it opened; its strongest openings were the United Kingdom with $19.3 million, Germany with $12.4 million, South Korea with $8.5 million, Australia with $7.3 million, and China with $5.5 million. The Chinese opening was the fourth-biggest opening to date for the country. Other international performances included $3.4 million in Brazil and $3.1 million in Taiwan. In Hong Kong, the film opened in first place with $1.3 million, averaging $37,300 across the 35 venues. The film's overall gross for its opening five-day weekend worldwide was $185.6 million.

In the following weekend of July 11–13, 2008, Hancock fell to second place in the United States and Canada behind Hellboy II: The Golden Army, grossing an estimated $33 million, a "modest" 47% drop in revenue. Overseas, Hancock expanded to 8,125 screens across 67 markets, ranking first at the box office again in 30 markets. The film's top opening grosses for the weekend included $11.4 million in Russia (589 screens), $9.9 million in France (739 screens), $4.6 million in Mexico (783 screens), $2.2 million in India (429 screens), $1.7 million in The Netherlands (90 screens), $1.3 million in Belgium (69 screens), and $1 million in Ukraine (81 screens). In territories playing Hancock for a second weekend, the United Kingdom dropped 45% to reach $33.4 million, Germany 37% to reach $24.2 million, Korea 38% to reach $14.7 million, and Australia 47% to reach $14.4 million. For the second weekend, with the 67 markets, Hancock accumulated an estimated $71.4 million in the international box office, only a $7.2 million drop from the previous weekend in territories outside the United States and Canada. Hancock grossed $227.9 million in the United States and Canada, and $401.5 million in other territories, for a worldwide total of $629.4 million.

=== Home media ===
Hancock was part of Sony's experiment in providing content to consumers who owned a BRAVIA television equipped with an Internet connection. The film's release over the Internet took place after its theatrical run and before its release on DVD. According to Sony executives, distributing Hancock was an opportunity to showcase BRAVIA, though the method was perceived as an "obvious threat" to cable companies' video on demand. The film was available to BRAVIA owners from October 28, 2008 to November 10, 2008.

The film was released on DVD, Blu-ray Disc and UMD on November 25, 2008. The single-disc DVD provides a theatrical cut (92 minutes) and an unrated cut (102 minutes) as well as five featurettes and two documentaries. The double-disc DVD includes these features, a digital copy of the film, and two additional making-of extras. The Blu-ray Disc includes these, an on-set visual diary, and a picture-in-picture track. George Lang of The Oklahoman described the unrated cut as "a rare instance when deleted scenes enhance the final product". Christopher Monfette of IGN thought that the Blu-ray Disc was a "beautiful" transfer, the audio was well-balanced, and the featurettes were well-supplied.

In the week ending November 30, Hancock placed first on three video charts: the Nielsen VideoScan First Alert sales chart, Home Media Magazine's video rental chart, and Nielsen's Blu-ray Disc chart. With the year's Black Friday shopping day on November 28, Hancock was the top seller in the Blu-ray Disc format. Over 5.38 million DVDs were sold for a revenue of $91,066,638.

== Critical reception ==
Variety reported that the film got "generally poor reviews", and Reuters said the film was "critically mauled" by critics who liked the premise but were confounded by the subplot involving Charlize Theron's character. On the review aggregator website Rotten Tomatoes, 42% of 227 critics' reviews are positive, with an average rating of 5.4/10. The website's consensus reads: "Though it begins with promise, Hancock suffers from a flimsy narrative and poor execution." Metacritic, which assigns a normalized rating out of 100 to reviews from mainstream critics, calculated a score of 49 out of 100, based on 37 critics, indicating "mixed or average" reviews.

Some critics reported that the film was a jumble of ideas that, despite starting well, did not fully deliver the edgy satire the subject matter promised, with a general consensus forming that it suffered from a weak story and poor execution. Todd McCarthy of Variety felt that the film's premise was undermined by the execution. McCarthy believed the concept ensured the film was "amusing and plausible" for its first half, but that the second half was full of illogical story developments and missed opportunities. Stephen Farber of The Hollywood Reporter said that the opening established the premise well, but that the film came undone when it began to alternate between comedy and tragedy, and introduced a backstory for Hancock that didn't make sense. He said it rewrote its own internal logic in order to pander to its audience. Stephen Hunter in The Washington Post claimed it had begun with promise, but that the change in tone partway through was so abrupt that the film did not recover. Jim Schembri of The Age called the change in direction "an absolute killer story twist", and David Denby of The New Yorker said it lifted the film to a new level by supplementing the jokes with sexual tension and emotional power.

Jim Schembri reported that Berg's direction helped to sell Hancock's "well-drawn" backstory, Todd McCarthy said the gritty visual approach adopted by Berg did not mesh well with the "vulgar goofiness" of certain scenes, and Stephen Farber pointed out that Berg's frantic direction compounded the storytelling errors. Stephen Hunter claimed that Berg had not understood that the shifting tone and plot twists were meant to be humorous, and that he had played straight what was supposed to be a dark comedy and subversive satire. David Denby said Berg's style—especially his use of close-ups—was intended to showcase "genuine actors at work", while Manohla Dargis of The New York Times insisted Berg had taken Hancock to heart and brought gravity to the film.

David Denby described Smith's performance as contrasting with his performances in his other films. He said, "For the first time in his life, Will Smith doesn't flirt with the audience... he stays in character as a self-hating lonely guy." Stephen Hunter argued that Smith and his co-stars had misunderstood the material in the same manner as Berg. He added that the examination of Smith's character came across at first as an examination of "phenomenally gifted" black sporting superstars who were "marginalized", "dehumanized" and exploited as a product by society. Manohla Dargis was struck by Theron's performance, saying that she enabled Smith to deepen the film's emotional complexity. Todd McCarthy said that Smith's "attitude-laden quips" helped to carry the film's superior first half, and that all three leads performed capably, but he said no opportunity was offered for the supporting characters to register. Roger Ebert writing in the Chicago Sun Times praised the three leads, saying that Smith avoided playing Hancock "as a goofball" and instead portrayed him as a more subtle and serious character. Stephen Farber said that Hancock was a good showcase for the leads, affirming that Smith shone in a film that was only sporadically worthy of his performance.

Jim Schembri concluded that the film was "refreshing, savvy, fun and fast". He said it managed to mix comedy and action successfully, and that the drama came across as surprisingly genuine. Stephen Farber believed that the extended development of the film had reduced its quality, but that the visual effects were "stellar" and showed wit. McCarthy praised the effects, but said the film was "both overwrought and severely undernourished." Roger Ebert observed the film was "a lot of fun", and Manohla Dargis admitted that it was "unexpectedly satisfying". She said that while it faltered and felt rushed towards its end, it had an emotional complexity and "raggedness" that spoke with sincerity about essential human vulnerabilities. Stephen Hunter concluded that Hancock was ultimately "indigestible".

== Accolades ==
Hancock won the award for "Best Summer Action/Adventure Movie" at the 2008 Teen Choice Awards. Smith's performance won him the award for "Favorite Movie Actor" at the 2009 Kids' Choice Awards.

Awards and nominations
Ceremony	Award	Category	Name	Result	Ref.
Academy of Science Fiction, Fantasy & Horror Films	Saturn Awards	Best Actor	Will Smith	Nominated	
Academy of Science Fiction, Fantasy & Horror Films	Saturn Awards	Best Fantasy Film	Hancock	Nominated	
Academy of Science Fiction, Fantasy & Horror Films	Saturn Awards	Best Supporting Actress	Charlize Theron	Nominated	
BET Awards	BET Award	Best Actor	Will Smith (also for Seven Pounds)	Won	
National Academy of Motion Pictures Arts and Sciences of Russia	Golden Eagle Award	Best Foreign Language Film	Peter Berg	Nominated	
Golden Trailer Awards	Golden Trailer	Summer 2008 Blockbuster	Hancock	Nominated	
Nickelodeon Kids' Choice Awards	Blimp Award	Favorite Movie Actor	Will Smith	Won	
National Movie Awards	National Movie Award	Best Performance – Male	Will Smith	Nominated	
National Movie Awards	National Movie Award	Best Superhero	Hancock	Nominated	
People's Choice Awards	People's Choice Award	Favorite Superhero	Will Smith (as John Hancock)	Nominated	
Teen Choice Awards	Teen Choice Award	Choice Summer: Movie — Action Adventure	Hancock	Won	

== Possible sequel ==
Director Peter Berg said prior to Hancock's release that if the film pulled in as much business as predicted, a sequel, Hancock 2, would likely follow. After the film's release on DVD and Blu-ray Disc, actor Will Smith said that there was ongoing discussion about a possible sequel, "The ideas aren't ... developed, but we are building out an entire world; I think people are going to be very surprised at the new world of Hancock." In August 2009, Columbia Pictures hired screenwriters Adam Fierro and Glen Mazzara to write the sequel, and the studio planned to bring back the producing team from the original film. Charlize Theron confirmed that she would reprise her role, and Berg said to expect a third actor to star as another figure with powers like Smith's and Theron's characters. In January 2012, Berg reaffirmed his plans to make the film. During a 2020 interview, Theron indicated that she remained interested in a Hancock sequel but admitted there had been no progress to move forward to production. In February 2025, during a surprise appearance on xQc’s Twitch live stream, Will Smith teased the sequel, while stating that Zendaya was being approached for a role.

== See also ==
- List of films about angels

== Bibliography ==
- Fordham, Joe (October 2008). "Overview: Carey Villegas & Ken Hahn on Hancock". Cinefex. No. 115. ISSN 0198-1056.
- Holben, Jay (July 2008). "A Not-So-Super Hero". American Cinematographer. Vol. 89, no. 7. ISSN 0002-7928.
