= Karate Kid (disambiguation) =

The Karate Kid is a 1984 film.

Karate Kid may also refer to:

== The Karate Kid franchise ==
- The Karate Kid Part II, the 1986 sequel to the 1984 film
- The Karate Kid Part III, the 1989 sequel to the 1986 film
- The Next Karate Kid, the 1994 sequel to the 1989 film
- The Karate Kid (video game), based on the first two films
- The Karate Kid (TV series), a 1989 animated television series based on the first three films
- The Karate Kid (2010 film), a remake of the 1984 film
- Karate Kid: Legends, the upcoming sixth film in the series
- Cobra Kai, a 2018 television series and sequel to the original films

== Other uses ==
- Karate Kid (character), a DC Comics superhero
- Karate Kids U.S.A., a 1980 film
- "Karate Kid", an episode of Legion of Super Heroes
- "The Karate Kid", a song by Coldplay from the 2024 album Moon Music (Full Moon Edition)

== See also ==
- Kung Fu Kid (disambiguation)
