= Shuangshou jian =

Chinese two-handed sword

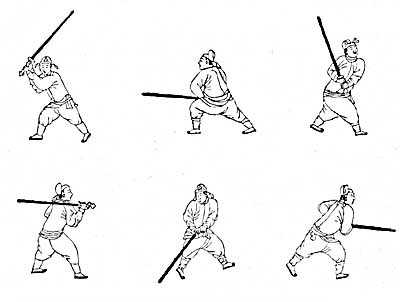
- Shuangshou jian techniques as depicted in Mao Yuanyi's 17th century military manual, the Wubei Zhi.
- Traditional Chinese: 雙手劍
- Simplified Chinese: 双手剑
Transcriptions
Standard Mandarin
- Hanyu Pinyin: Shuāngshǒu jiàn

The shuangshou jian (lit: two-handed sword) is a Chinese two-handed double-edged straight sword (jian). Historically, shuangshou jian were up to 1.6 meters (63 in) in length, and the two-handed grip could be used as a lever to lock the opponent's arm if necessary. Large ring pommels are prevalent in the construction of shuangshou jian.
