= Hancock (soundtrack) =

Hancock (Original Motion Picture Soundtrack)

Film score by John Powell
- Released: July 1, 2008
- Recorded: 2008
- Studios: Sony Scoring Stage, Sony Pictures, Culver City; 5 Cat, Hollywood, Los Angeles; The Village, West Los Angeles
- Genre: Film score
- Length: 44:43
- Label: Varèse Sarabande
- Producer: John Powell

John Powell chronology
Kung Fu Panda (2008)	Hancock (Original Motion Picture Soundtrack) (2008)	Bolt (2008)

Hancock (Original Motion Picture Soundtrack) is the film score soundtrack to the 2008 film Hancock, directed by Peter Berg and starring Will Smith. The film score is composed by John Powell and released under the Varèse Sarabande label on July 1, 2008.

== Background ==
John Powell composed the score in his maiden collaboration with Berg and violinist Eun-Mee Ahn who had previously worked with director Berg on The Rundown, which is composed by Harry Gregson-Williams.

It was performed by the Hollywood Studio Symphony with Blake Neely, Don Harper and Pete Anthony conducting the 110-piece orchestra at the Sony Scoring Stage. The score was released digitally and physically through the Varèse Sarabande label on July 1, 2008.

== Critical reception ==
Thomas Simpson of Soundtrack.net wrote "The score for Hancock is a morsel of music goodness. It is filled with little quirks that stand out for the conscious listener." Thomas Glorieux of Maintitles.net wrote "Powell does show he can do a lot with more serious emotional adventure material than most people seem to realize." Jonathan Broxton of Movie Music UK wrote "John Powell is developing into a composer of great skill and technique, with an ear for superb orchestral nuance, memorable themes, and interesting arrangements. In a summer where box office records have tumbled like dominoes, Hancock stands are one of its most accomplished and enjoyable musical by-products." Christian Clemmensen of Filmtracks.com wrote "It's not as fragmented as his recent Horton Hears a Who! score, for it has some lengthy statements of consistency late on the album, but you still get the impression that Hancock lacks a definitive anchor for all of its components."

Zanobard Reviews summarized "John Powell’s Hancock makes for amazing listening, and by far the best thing about it is how the music transitions from standard action score at the beginning to full on superhero by the end." Mark Morton of AllMusic wrote "Beginning with brash, jazzy swagger, this soundtrack first exudes a boldness akin to Lalo Schifrin’s Rush Hour scores. But the music soon alternates between the character's emotional awakening and intense, [The] Bourne Supremacy-like action motifs, until all of these disparate elements unite in a big finale." Manohla Dargis of The New York Times called the score "bombastic".

== Track listing ==
Hancock (Original Motion Picture Soundtrack) track listing
No.	Title	Length
1.	"SUV Chase"	2:01
2.	"John, Meet Ray"	2:05
3.	"Train Disaster"	2:40
4.	"Meatballs?"	0:57
5.	"The Trailer"	2:01
6.	"French Asshole"	1:32
7.	"Superhero Comix"	0:43
8.	"You Should Go!"	0:52
9.	"Mary Brings Meatballs"	1:36
10.	"Getting Therapy"	2:18
11.	"To War"	1:19
12.	"I Really Hate That Word"	0:49
13.	"Standing Ovation"	1:06
14.	"The Kiss"	2:20
15.	"Indestructible"	2:05
16.	"Hollywood Blvd"	6:25
17.	"Mortal"	5:27
18.	"Upon Us All"	1:19
19.	"Death and Transfiguration"	3:55
20.	"The Moon and the Superhero"	3:13
Total length:		44:43

== Personnel ==
- Music composer and producer – John Powell
- Additional music and programming – Henry Jackman, James McKee Smith, John Ashton Thomas
- Recording and mixing – Shawn Murphy
- Additional recording – Dan Lerner, Hugo Nicolson
- Digital recordist – Erik Swanson
- Mastering – Patricia Sullivan Fourstar
- Score editor – David Channing
- Music editor – Katie Greathouse, Katrina Schiller, Daniel Lerner
- Assistant music editor – Mario Vitale
- Score compiler – Daniel Lerner
- Music supervisor – George Drakoulias
- Music coordinator – Germaine Franco
- Music preparation – JoAnn Kane Music Service, Mark Graham
- Scoring crew – Adam Michalak, Bryan Clements, Dave Marquette, Dominick Gonzalez, Greg Loskorn, Jay Sylvester, Mark Eshelman
- Music consultant – Bob Badami, Koji Egawa
- Musical assistance – Michael Mollo
- Executive producer – Robert Townson

Orchestra

- Performer – The Hollywood Studio Symphony
- Supervising orchestrator – John Ashton Thomas
- Additional orchestration – Brad Dechter, Dave Metzger, Germaine Franco, Jane Cornish, Kevin Kliesch, Randy Kerber
- Conductor – Blake Neely, Don Harper, Pete Anthony
- Contractor – Gina Zimmitti
- Concertmaster – Bruce Dukov

Instruments

- Bass – Bruce Morgenthaler, Chris Kollgaard, Drew Dembowski, Ed Meares, Oscar Hidalgo, Sue Ranney, Larry Taylor
- Bassoon – Damian Montano, Ken Munday
- Cello – Cecilia Tsan, Tina Soule, Chris Ermacoff, Dane Little, Dan Smith, Dennis Karmazyn, Larry Corbett, Paul Cohen, Paula Hochhalter, Roger Lebow, Steve Erdody, Trevor Handy
- Clarinet – Don Foster, Stuart Clark
- Drums – Joey Waronker
- Dulcimer – George Doering
- Flute – Dave Shostac, Heather Clark, Julie Long
- French horn – Brian O'Connor, Daniel Kelley, Jim Thatcher, John Reynolds, Kate Dennis, Kristy Morrell, Laura Griffiths, Mark Adams, Nathan Campbell, Paul Klintworth, Steve Becknell, Todd Miller
- Guitar – Larry Taylor, George Doering
- Harp – Katie Kirkpatrick, Marcia Dickstein
- Hand percussion – Alex Acuña, Brian Kilgore, Lenny Castro, Luis Conte, Walter Rodriguez
- Oboe – Barbara Northcutt, Bernadette Avila
- Percussion – Satnam Ramgotra
- Piano, Celesta, Organ, Harmonium – Doug Petty
- Trombone – Alex Iles, Bill Reichenbach, Bruce Otto, Charlie Loper, Phil Teele, Steve Holtman
- Trumpet – Dan Fornero, Harry Kim, Jon Lewis, Rick Baptist
- Tuba – Doug Tornquist
- Viola – Alma Fernandez, Brian Dembow, Carole Castillo, Carolyn Riley, Dmitri Bovaird, John Hayhurst, Karie Prescott, Kate Reddish, Keith Greene, Matt Funes, Sam Formicola, Thomas Diener
- Violin – Alan Grunfeld, Alyssa Park, Caroline Campbell, Darius Campo, David Ewart, Eun-Mee Ahn, Helen Nightengale, Jay Rosen, Joel Derouin, Josefina Vergara, Julie Gigante, Julie Rogers, Kathleen Robertson, Katia Popov, Kevin Connolly, Lesa Terry, Liane Mautner, Lily Ho Chen, Natalie Leggett, Neel Hammond, Phillip Levy, Becky Bunnell, Roberto Cani, Robin Olson, Sara Parkins, Sarah Thornblade, Sid Page, Susan Chatman, Susie Hanson, Tammy Hatwan, Roger Wilkie

== Accolades ==
Accolades for Hancock (Original Motion Picture Soundtrack)
Award	Category	Result	Ref.
ASCAP Film and Television Music Awards	Top Box Office Films	Won (Note: also for Bolt, Horton Hears a Who! and Jumper (all 2008))	
International Film Music Critics Association Awards	Best Original Score for an Action/Adventure/Thriller Film	Nominated	
