= Kung fu (disambiguation) =

Kung fu, or Chinese martial arts, are a number of fighting styles that have developed over the centuries in China.

== Chinese culture ==
- Kung fu (term), meaning "achievement through great effort"
- Gongfu tea, also known as kung fu tea
- Kungfu (restaurant), a fast-food chain in China

== Sports ==
- Kung Fu (wrestler) (1951–2001), Mexican luchador
- Kung Fu Naki, ringname of Japanese professional wrestler Shoichi Funaki (born 1968)
- Shijiazhuang Gongfu F.C., a Chinese football club

== Media ==
=== Film ===
- Kung fu film, Chinese martial arts film
- Kung Fu, a character from the 1977 Japanese film House

=== Television ===
- Kung Fu (1972 TV series), a 1972–75 TV series starring David Carradine
- Kung Fu: The Legend Continues, a subsequent TV series (1993–97) also starring David Carradine
- Kung Fu (2021 TV series), an adaptation of the 1970s TV series

=== Music ===
- "Kung Fu" (Ash song), 1995
- "Kung Fu" (YBN Cordae song), 2018
- "Kung-Fu" (187 Lockdown song), 1998
- Kung Fu Records, an American independent punk record label
- "Kung Fu", a song by Curtis Mayfield from the 1974 album Sweet Exorcist
- "Kung-Fu", a song by The Dirtbombs from the 2001 album Ultraglide in Black
- "Kung Fu", a song by Emeli Sandé from the album 2016 Long Live the Angels

=== Video game ===
- Kung-Fu Master (video game), also known as Kung Fu

== See also ==
- Kung Fu Kid (disambiguation)
- Kung Fu master (disambiguation)
- Kung Fu Panda (disambiguation)
- Kung Fu Hustle, a 2004 Cantonese-language action comedy film
- "Kung Fu Fighting", a 1974 single by Carl Douglas
