= Kung Fu Panda (soundtrack) =

2008 film soundtrack album

Film score by Hans Zimmer and John Powell
- Released: June 3, 2008
- Recorded: 2008
- Studio: AIR Studios
- Genres: Classical; traditional; Chinese
- Length: 60:16
- Label: Interscope
- Producers: Hans Zimmer; John Powell; The Underdogs

Hans Zimmer chronology
The Simpsons Movie (2007)	Kung Fu Panda (2008)	The Dark Knight (2008)

John Powell chronology
Stop-Loss (2008)	Kung Fu Panda (2008)	Hancock (2008)

Kung Fu Panda (Music from the Motion Picture) is the score album to the 2008 film Kung Fu Panda. The album features an original score composed by Hans Zimmer and John Powell, and a cover of the disco song "Kung Fu Fighting" performed by CeeLo Green and Jack Black (who also plays Po, the lead character). The album consisted of traditional and orchestral scores, infused with Chinese music, where Zimmer visited China to study the traditions and culture. As a process, the score was recorded with mostly Chinese traditional instruments, and the China National Symphony Orchestra also performed the score. The 17-track album was released by Interscope Records on June 3, 2008.

The Japanese version uses "Your Seed" by Hey!Say!JUMP as the theme song.

== Development ==
Hans Zimmer was roped in as the composer for Kung Fu Panda, thereby making his sixth DreamWorks Animation film. (Note: The previous DreamWorks films which Zimmer had scored includes: The Prince of Egypt (1998), The Road to El Dorado (2000), Spirit: Stallion of the Cimarron (2002), Shark Tale (2004) and Madagascar (2005). Zimmer further collaborated in other ventures, as executive producer, while most of them were scored by the Remote Control Productions family of composers.) While Zimmer was intended to be the sole composer, his protégé John Powell was later brought into the project; Powell's involvement was confirmed by CEO of DreamWorks Animation, Jeffrey Katzenberg, after the test screening of the film. This marked Zimmer and Powell's third film working together, after Chill Factor (1999) and DreamWorks' The Road to El Dorado (2000).

To score for the film, Zimmer visited China to absorb the culture and influence of traditional Chinese music. In the process, he got to know about the Chinese National Symphony orchestra and brought them on their project, along with the London Symphony Orchestra and London Voices also performing. Recording of the score was held at AIR Studios in London. Several Chinese instruments, such as erhu, guzheng and Chinese flutes were used in the score.

John Stevenson and Mark Osborne did not want "to have a soundtrack that had contemporary pop songs in it", but instead a traditional and orchestral score for a "big, epic film". Stevenson attributed Zimmer and Powell had "both the ability to create lush musical landscapes", hence "there is a huge, majestic, epic quality to Hans' music and John's exciting and innovative ideas". Osborne said, "We told them from the very beginning we wanted our film to be an intimate story about one character, but the backdrop was just epic, with a very formal and martial world. So, for us, it was a strong contrast between the two elements that were the most important to our storytelling, and we wanted them to explore that aspect. So, Hans gave us this huge, epic and beautiful dragon warrior theme, which is very emotional and very sweeping and John was the one who provided us with our very simple, very humble Po music. From both of them, we knew that it would be the perfect marriage because the film was a marriage of extremes."

In addition to Zimmer's score, a rewritten version of the classical song "Kung Fu Fighting" (1974) was performed by CeeLo Green and Jack Black, while the end credits version of the song is sung by Rain and Sam Concepcion, in the soundtrack marketing of the East Asian editions, and Mumiy Troll for the Russian edition. American rapper-producer Timbaland also contributed to the soundtrack.

== Reception ==
Filmtracks.com wrote "The score by Zimmer and Powell achieves everything necessary for the film, and as for its translation onto album, only the inconsistency of the comedy and actual fight material in the middle of the product, as well as the few moments of outward cross-cultural flair, restrain it from a fourth star." James Southall of Movie Wave wrote "Kung Fu Panda is good fun - a little silly at times, perhaps - but undemanding and enjoyable. Both composers are well and truly within their comfort zones but sometimes that doesn't particularly matter, and this is one of those times. The dominant voice is Zimmer's, but this is an album which should please fans of both composers."

Music critic Jonathan Broxton wrote "The score is of the faux-Oriental variety, and makes use of a number of traditional (and increasingly) familiar local instruments, notably the erhu and the pipa, alongside a large-scale western symphony orchestra." James Christopher Monger of AllMusic mentioned that Zimmer and Powell "infuse the score with plenty of semi-traditional Asian motifs and instrumentation, resulting in an enjoyable -- if entirely predictable -- soundtrack that deals out clichés like candy on Halloween". About the opening cue, "Hero", he called it "a wistful flute-led melody that sounds nearly identical to Howard Shore's "Hobbit" theme from the Lord of the Rings trilogy. What follows is largely orchestral, with bursts of tribal percussion and the occasional dance number."

Writing for the website Film Music Institute, Adam DiTroia said "Kung Fu scores tend to fail when they try to hit every punch and kick, and Zimmer and Powell are smart enough to go for a cumulative wallop instead of going for every action move. Their's is a great kind of “busy” music that manages to hit everything anyway, but with a focus on theme and melody that are hallmarks of popcorn scoring masters. It's a sweet, lush groove that makes this Panda highly listenable, getting across the humor and emotion with a sound that's anything but “cartoon” music. And if Panda might have one too many training montages to get its character into fighting shape, Zimmer and Powell effortlessly plow through the exercises. When emotion hits, the duo play it with real heart."

== Track listing ==
No.	Title	Length
1.	"Hero"	4:42
2.	"Let the Tournament Begin"	1:59
3.	"Dragon Warrior Is Among Us"	2:57
4.	"Tai Lung Escapes"	7:06
5.	"Peach Tree of Wisdom"	1:53
6.	"Accu-Flashback"	4:05
7.	"Impersonating Shifu"	2:19
8.	"Sacred Pool of Tears"	9:51
9.	"Training Po"	1:28
10.	"The Bridge"	3:23
11.	"Shifu Faces Tai Lung"	4:46
12.	"The Dragon Scroll"	2:31
13.	"Po vs Tai Lung"	2:41
14.	"Dragon Warrior Rises"	3:22
15.	"Panda Po"	2:39
16.	"Oogway Ascends"	2:04
17.	"Kung Fu Fighting" (performed by CeeLo Green and Jack Black)	2:30
Total length:		60:16

== Accolades ==
Award	Category	Name	Outcome
Annie Awards	Best Music in an Animated Feature Production	Hans Zimmer, John Powell	Won
ASCAP Award	Top Box Office Films	Hans Zimmer, John Powell	Won

== Personnel ==
Credits adapted from CD liner notes.

- Music – Hans Zimmer, John Powell
- Additional music – Henry Jackman, James McKee Smith
- Score engineer – Chris Barrett
- Recording – Nick Wollage
- Mixing – Alan Meyerson, Greg Vines
- Mastering – Pat Sullivan
- Music editing – Adam Smalley, Peter "Oso" Snell
- Music co-ordinator – Andrew Zack
- Orchestra – Isobel Griffiths
- Orchestration – John Ashton Thomas
- Additional orchestration – Dave Metzger, Germaine Franco, Jake Parker, Jane Antonia Cornish, Jon A. Coleman, Kevin Kliesch
- Orchestra leader – Perry Montague-Mason
- Orchestra conductor – Gavin Greenaway
- Orchestra contractor – Isobel Griffiths, Lucy Whalley
- Choir – London Voices
- Alto Vocals – Heather Cairncross, Sarah Simmonds
- Bass Vocals – Michael Dore, Russell Matthews
- Cello – Jonathan Williams
- Clarinet – Nicholas Bucknall
- Erhu – Karen Han
- French Horn – Richard Bissill
- Percussion – Paul Clarvis
- Trombone – Darren Smith, Roger Argente
- Trumpet – Andy Crowley
- Tuba – Oren Marshall
- Viola – Andrew Parker, Bruce White, Rachel Bolt
- Violin – Chris Clad, Mark Berrow, Tom Pigott-Smith
