= Kung Fu master =

Kung Fu master or Kung Fu Master may refer to:

- Shifu, a Chinese title meaning "master" that is most often used in English to address a teacher of Chinese martial arts

== Film and television ==
- Kung Fu Master (film), a 1988 French drama film directed by Agnès Varda
- The Kung Fu Master (TV series), a 1994 Hong Kong martial arts television series directed by Benny Chan
- Ip Man: Kung Fu Master, a 2019 Chinese martial arts film
- The Kung Fu Master, a 2020 Indian martial arts film directed and written by Abrid Shine
- Kung Fu Master, a 2005 Hong Kong film directed and produced by Gordon Chan

== Video games ==
- Kung-Fu Master (video game), a 1984 beat 'em up developed by Irem
- The Kung-Fu Master Jackie Chan, a 1995 fighting game developed and published by Kaneko

== See also ==
- Kung Fu Cult Master, a 1993 Hong Kong wuxia film directed and written by Wong Jing
