= Kung Fu Kid (disambiguation) =

Kung Fu Kid is a 1987 Sega Master game.

Kung Fu Kid may also refer to:

== Film ==
- The Kung Fu Kid (1977 film), a 1977 Hong Kong film directed by Lo Wei
- Kung Fu Kid (1994 film), a 1994 Hong Kong film
- The Kung Fu Kid (1995 film), a 1995 Hong Kong film produced by Golden Harvest
- Kung Fu Kid (2007 film), a 2007 Japanese film with Shinji Takeda
- The Kung Fu Kid, the working title of the 2010 American film The Karate Kid
- Shaolin Kung Fu Kids, a 1995 Hong Kong film with Roger Kwok
- Super Kung Fu Kid, a 1974 Hong Kong film with Yuen Wah
- Young Dragons: Kung Fu Kids, a 1987 Taiwanese film directed by Kevin Chu

== Television ==
- Kung Fu Kids, a Philippine television series
- The Kung-fu Kids, a Taiwanese television series directed by Kevin Chu
- Motu Patlu and Mission Kung Fu Kid, an Indian animated television film based on the Motu Patlu animated TV show

== Other uses ==
- Zak Bucia, American mixed martial artist nicknamed "The Kung Fu Kid"
- Young Foo - The Kung Fu Kid, a comic strip in the British comic magazine Cracker

== See also ==
- Karate Kid (disambiguation)
