= Jian =

Chinese double-edged sword

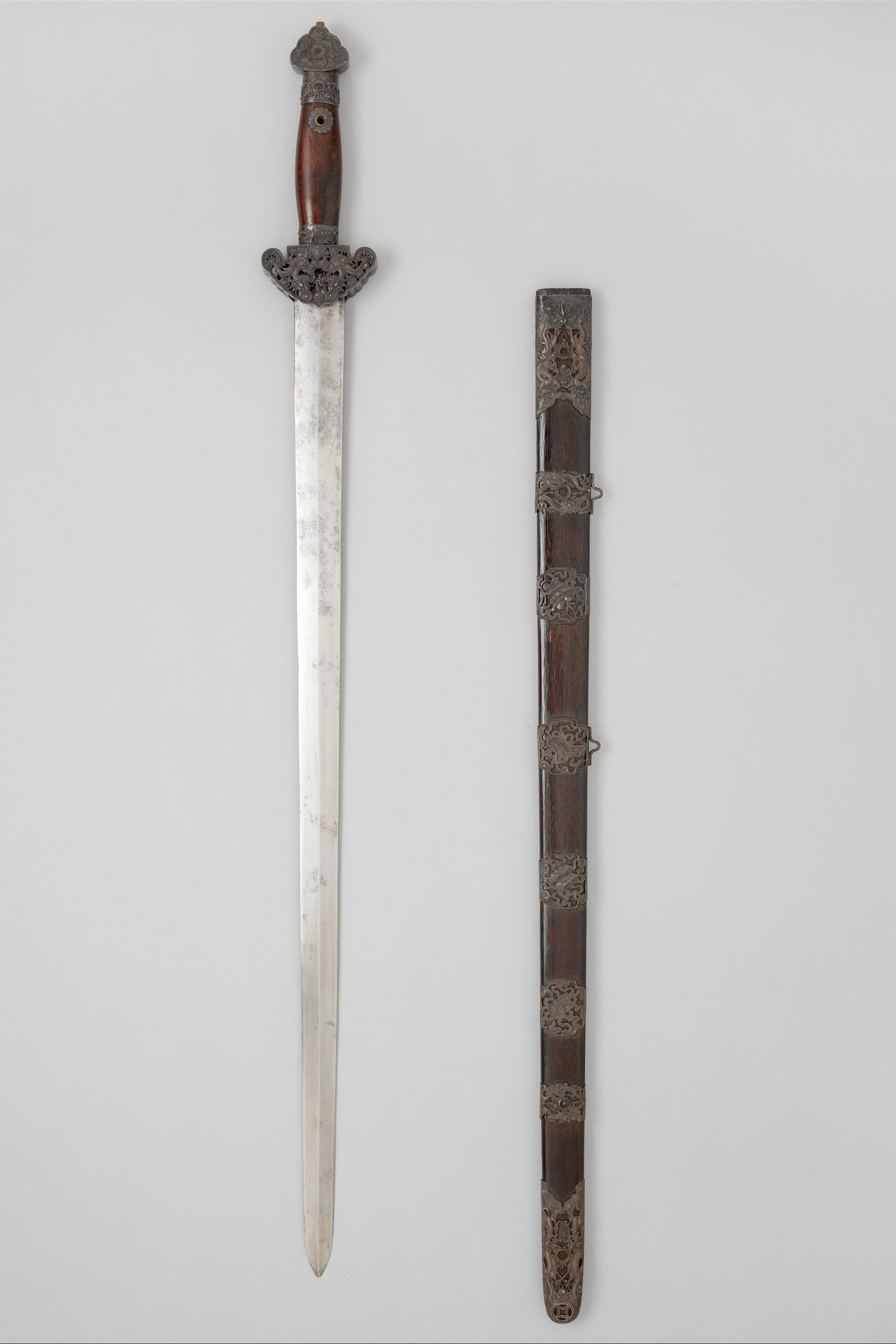
- Single-handed jian and scabbard of the 18th–19th century
- Traditional Chinese: 劍
- Simplified Chinese: 剑
Transcriptions
Standard Mandarin
- Hanyu Pinyin: jiàn
- Wade–Giles: chien^{4}
Yue: Cantonese
- Jyutping: gim3

The jian (simplified Chinese: 剑; traditional Chinese: 劍, Mandarin Chinese: [tɕjɛ̂n], Cantonese: [kim˧], English approximation: /dʒjɛn/ jyehn) is a Chinese term referring to all double-edged straight sword. Professional jian practitioners, who were often romanticized in historical records, folklores and wuxia literature, are referred to as jianshi (Chinese: 劍士; pinyin: jiànshì; lit. 'swordsman') or jianke (Chinese: 劍客; pinyin: jiànkè; lit. 'sword guests', a term dating from the Han dynasty referring to retainers or warriors errant skilled in swordfighting).

The first Chinese recorded sources that mention the jian date to the 7th century BCE during the Spring and Autumn period, with one of the earliest archaeological specimens being the famed Sword of Goujian. Early jian were made of bronze, which remained prevalent to as late as the Qin dynasty, but by the early Western Han dynasty bronze jian were largely supplanted by later ones made of carbon steel due to advancements in ironworking. Historically, the more ubiquitous one-handed jian have blades varying from 45 to 80 cm (18 to 31 inches) in length, with an average weight of a 70 cm (28-inch) blade-length jian would be approximately 700–900 g (1.5–2.0 pounds). Bronze jian tend to be much stouter (shorter, wider and thicker) and slightly heavier than steel jian, although slender, chrome-plated bronze swords uncovered among the Terracotta Army have lengths of 81–94.8 cm (31.9–37.3 inches), which are on par or even exceeding many Iron Age swords. There are also larger two-handed jian, though much rarer, used in many styles of Chinese martial arts or historically as anti-cavalry weapons (e.g. zhanmajian). In contemporary martial arts practice, the historical jian is most widely preserved as the unsharpened taijijian (commonly referred to in English as the tai chi sword), which typically uses a tempered semi-flexible 2Cr13 (SUS420J1 / AISI 420) stainless steel blade weighing 590 to 630 grams (1.30 to 1.39 pounds) balanced 6.0 to 9.0 centimeters (2.4 to 3.5 inches) in front of the guard for solo form training.

In Chinese culture, the jian is often revered as "the Gentleman of Weapons" and is considered one of the four first-tier weapons of the Eighteen Arms along with the gùn (quarterstaff), qiang (spear) and dao (saber or single-edged sword). Historically, the military role of jian as an infantry weapon (typically alongside a shield) was largely replaced by more efficient and economic options such as the dao, chui and polearms such as qiang and ji, although it remained popular as a defensive personal weapon and as a status symbol among the scholar-officials. Some jian, usually unsharpened (e.g. taijijian), are relegated to training weapon or performative prop roles in sword dances, combat sport (e.g. wushu) and fitness exercises (e.g. tai chi), while peachwood wasters (taomujian) are a standard ceremonial weapon in Taoist exorcism rituals.

== Parts of the jian ==
A guard or hilt protects the hand from an opposing blade. Guard shapes varied, but often had short wings or lobes pointing either forward or backward, the latter sometimes having an "ace of spades" appearance. Early jian often had very small, simple guards. From the Song and Ming periods onward, guards could feature zoomorphic shapes, or have crossbars and quillons. A minority of jian featured the disc-shaped guards associated with dao.

The jian's hilt can accommodate the grip of both hands or one hand plus two or three fingers of the other hand. Two-handed jiàn of up to 1.6 meters (63 inches) in length, known as shuangshou jian, existed but were not as common as the one-handed version. The longer two-handed handle could be used as a lever to lock an opponent's arm if necessary. Grips are usually of fluted wood or covered in rayskin, with a minority being wrapped with cord.

The end of the handle was finished with a pommel for balance, to prevent the handle from sliding through the hand should the hand's grip be loosened, and for striking or trapping the opponent as opportunity required—such as in "withdrawing" techniques. The pommel was historically peened onto the tang of the blade, thereby holding together as one solid unit the blade, guard, handle, and pommel. Most jian of the last century or so are assembled with a threaded tang onto which the pommel or pommel-nut is screwed.

Sometimes a tassel is attached to the hilt. During the Ming Dynasty these were usually passed through an openwork pommel, and in the Qing through a hole in the grip itself; modern swords usually attach the tassel to the end of the pommel. Historically these were likely used as lanyards, allowing the wielder to retain the sword in combat. There are some sword forms which utilize the tassel as an integral part of their swordsmanship style (sometimes offensively), while other schools dispense with sword tassels entirely. The movement of the tassel may have served to distract opponents, and some schools further claim that metal wires or thin silk cords were once worked into the tassels for impairing vision and causing bleeding when swept across the face. The tassel's use now is primarily decorative.

The blade itself is customarily divided into three sections for leverage in different offensive and defensive techniques. The tip of the blade is the jiànfeng, meant for stabbing, slashing, and quick percussive cuts. The jiànfeng typically curves smoothly to a point, though in the Ming period sharply angled points were common. Some antiques have rounded points, though these are likely the result of wear. The middle section is the zhongren or middle edge, and is used for a variety of offensive and defensive actions: cleaving cuts, draw cuts, and deflections. The section of blade closest to the guard is called the jiàngen or root, and is mainly used for defensive actions; on some late period jian, the base of the blade was made into a ricasso. These sections are not necessarily of the same length, with the jiànfeng being only three or four inches long.

Jian blades generally feature subtle profile taper (decreasing width), but often have considerable distal taper (decreasing thickness), with blade thickness near the tip being only half the thickness of the root's base. Jiàn may also feature differential sharpening, where the blade is made progressively sharper towards the tip, usually corresponding to the three sections of the blade. The cross-section of the blade is typically lenticular (eye-shaped) or a flattened diamond, with a visible central ridge; ancient bronze jian sometimes have a hexagonal cross-section.

== Materials ==
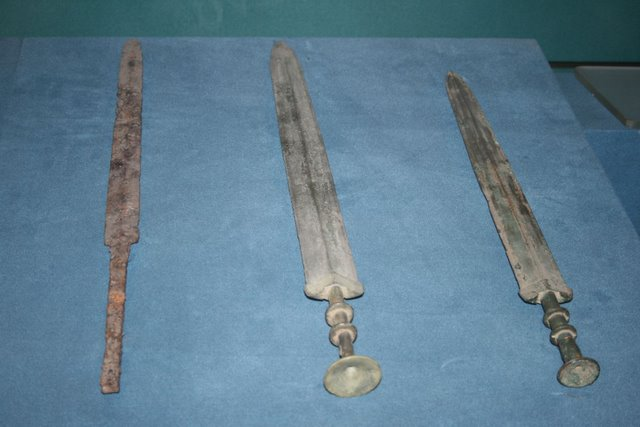
An iron sword and two bronze swords from the Chinese Warring States period

As with many ancient Chinese weapons, the jian were originally made of bronze, and then of tempered carbon steel as metallurgical technologies advanced. For training and non-combative applications (e.g. ceremonial or decorative), the jian might also be made of less-hard materials such as spring steel, wood, thermoplastic polymer and, in rear cases, carved from a single solid piece of jade.

Traditional jian blades are usually of sanmei (three-plate) construction, which involved sandwiching a core (spine) of harder steel between two plates of softer steel. The central plate protrudes slightly from its surrounding pieces, allowing for hard sharpened edges, while the softer plates acts as reinforcing composites that protect the brittle core from bending stress. Some blades had wumei or five-plate construction, with two more soft plates being used at the central ridge. Bronze jian were often made in a somewhat similar manner: in this case an alloy with a high copper content would be used to make a resilient core and spine, while the edge would be made from a high-tin-content alloy for sharpness and welded onto the rest of the blade.

The Chinese swordsmiths are often credited with the forging technologies that spread to Vietnam, Japan and Korea, allowing local blacksmiths there to create weapons as the katana. These technologies include folding, inserted alloys, and differential hardening of the edge. While the Japanese katana would be more influenced by the Chinese tangdao (Tang dynasty straight sabers), the early Japanese swords known as ken are often based on the jian. The Korean version of the jian is known as the geom or gum, and these swords often preserve features found in Ming-era jian, such as openwork pommels and sharply angled tips.

In martial art schools, wooden swords are used for swordfighting training, so most martial arts students' first experience with a jian in modern times is with one of those training weapons. Before schools were a formal way of passing on swordsmanship knowledge, students may have begun with a simple wooden stick when training with their teacher. In some religious Taoist sects, those wooden practice swords have come to have an esoteric ritual purpose. Some claim that these wooden swords metaphorically represent the discipline of an accomplished student.

While traditionally jian are often hammer-forged (either manually or using a trip hammer), contemporary swordsmith often use modern power hammer or hydraulic press while assembling the jian by mostly traditional methods. Some jian used purely for display purposes would use stainless steel, which is corrosion-resistant but considered too brittle for functional combat blades, sometimes pattern-welded to create a Damascus steel-like aesthetic. These contemporary jian can vary greatly in quality and historical accuracy, and are also sometimes forgeries (artificially aged and misrepresented as antique collectibles) for sale to tourists and collectors who cannot distinguish them from true antiques.

== Historical use ==
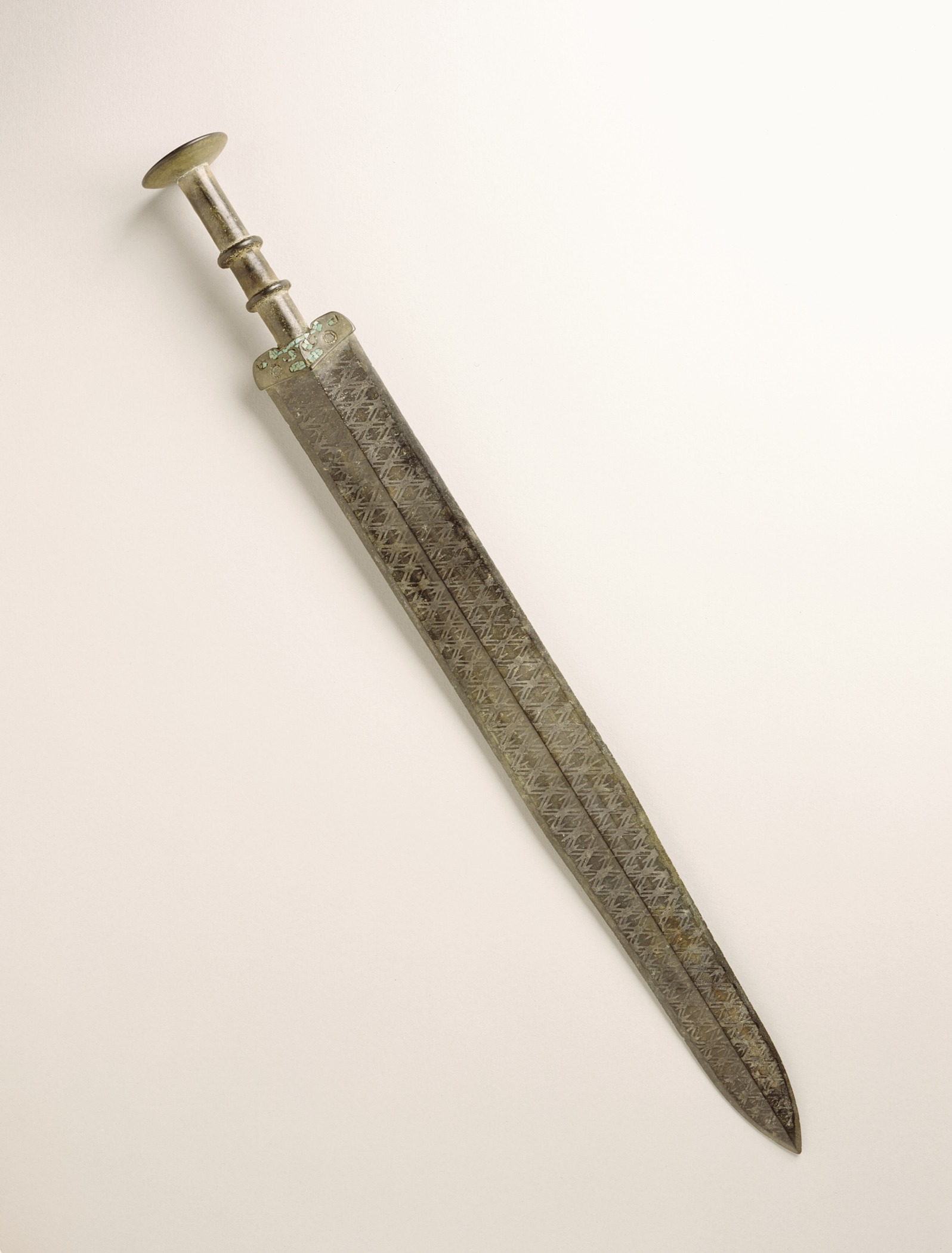
Bronze jian of the Warring States period

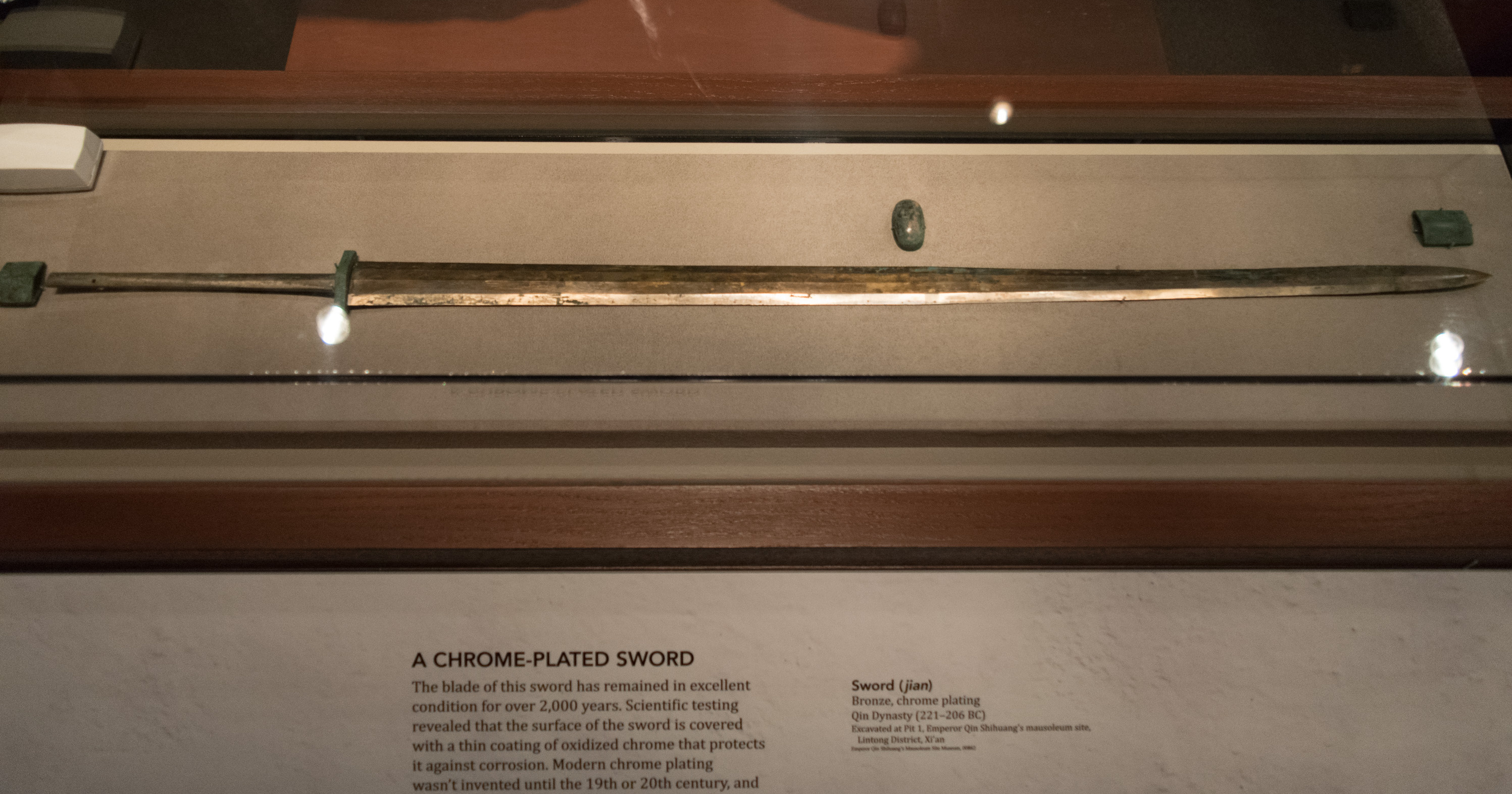
Bronze long jian excavated from the Terracotta Army, Qin dynasty

Originally similar to bronze double-edged daggers in varying lengths, jian reached modern lengths by roughly 500 BC. Though there is significant variation in length, balance, and weight of the jian from different periods, within any given period the general purpose of the jian is to be a multipurpose cut and thrust weapon capable of stabbing as well as making both precise cuts and slashes, as opposed to specializing in one form of use. Although the many forms and schools of swordsmanship with the jian vary, the general purpose and use is still not lost.

During the Qin and Han dynasties, the first two dynasties which united China, jian from the by then defunct Chu dynasty were very highly regarded. Chu became particularly famous for its swords after conquering the state of Yue, who had previously been famous for their swords, and who credited their sword techniques to a southern woman of unknown ancestry referred to as Yuenü.

Among the Terracotta warriors in the tomb of Qin Shi Huang, figures representing officers were originally armed with jian made from an alloy of copper, tin, and other elements including nickel, magnesium, and cobalt. Several double-edged bronze swords have been recovered by modern archaeologists, but most were stolen centuries ago along with the polearms and bows of the enlisted men.

Historical jian wielders would engage in test cutting called shizhan, practicing their skills on targets known as caoren, or "grass men". Such targets were made from bamboo, rice straw, or saplings. Though similar to the Japanese art of tameshigiri, shizhan was never formalized to the extent that the latter art was.

Today many Chinese martial arts such as tai chi and their martial artists still train extensively with jian, and expertise in its techniques is said by many of them to be the highest physical expression of their kung fu. Famous jian forms include Sancai Jian (三才劍), Kunwu Jian (崑吾劍), Wudang Xuanmen Jian (武當玄門劍), and taijijian (太極劍). Most jian today are flexible tai chi or wushu jian used mainly for ceremonial or performance purposes and not for actual combat. These swords have extremely thin blades or a high degree of flexibility compared to historical battlefield quality jian, properties intended to add auditory and visual appeal to a wushu performance. These same properties render them unsuitable for historically accurate combat.

== Military use ==
Since 2008, officers in the Chinese navy are issued with ceremonial swords resembling the traditional jian. Each sword has the owner's name engraved on the blade after graduation from the military academy.

== Exercise and performative uses ==
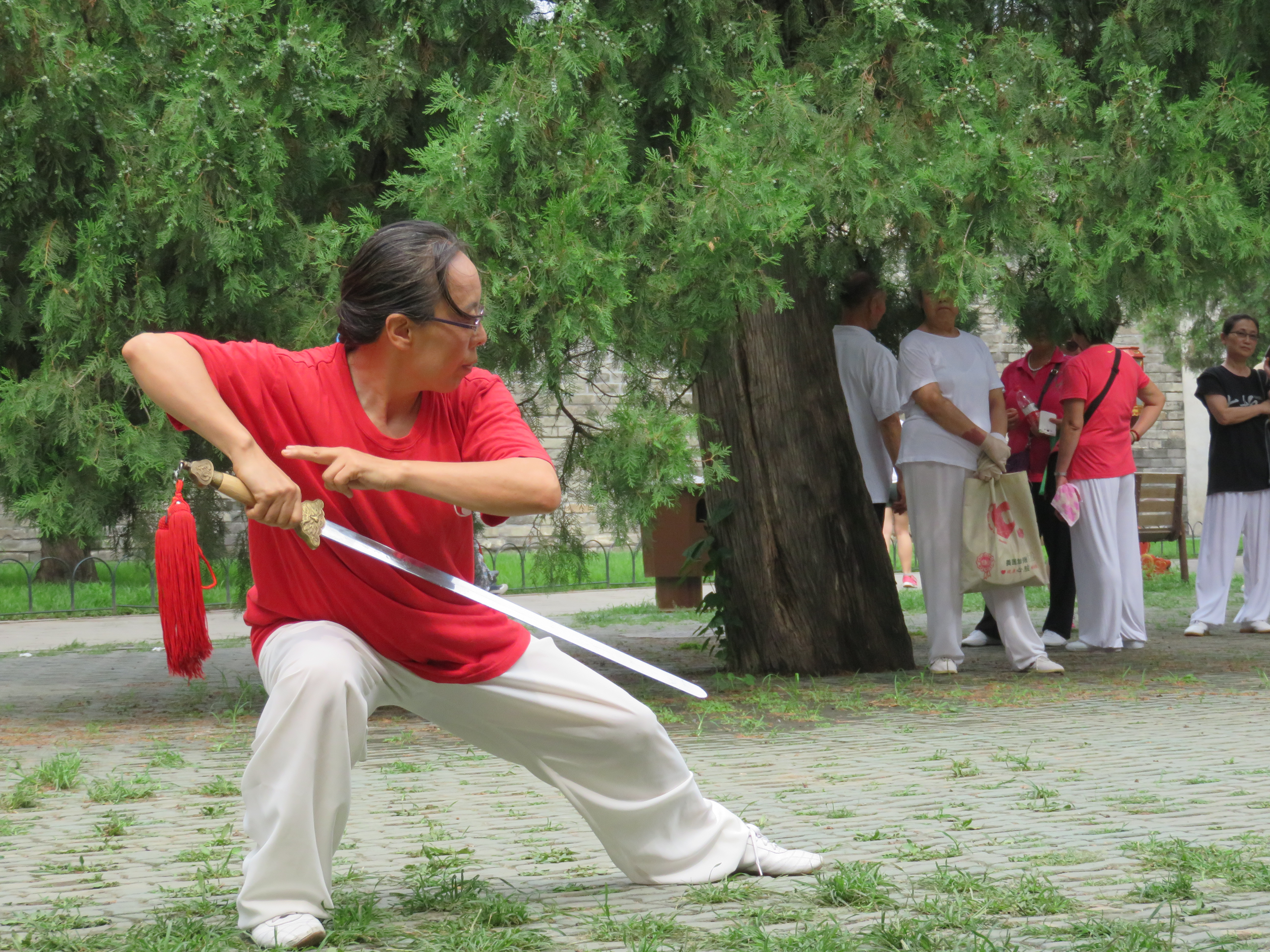
Taijijian exercises in the Temple of Heaven Park, Beijing

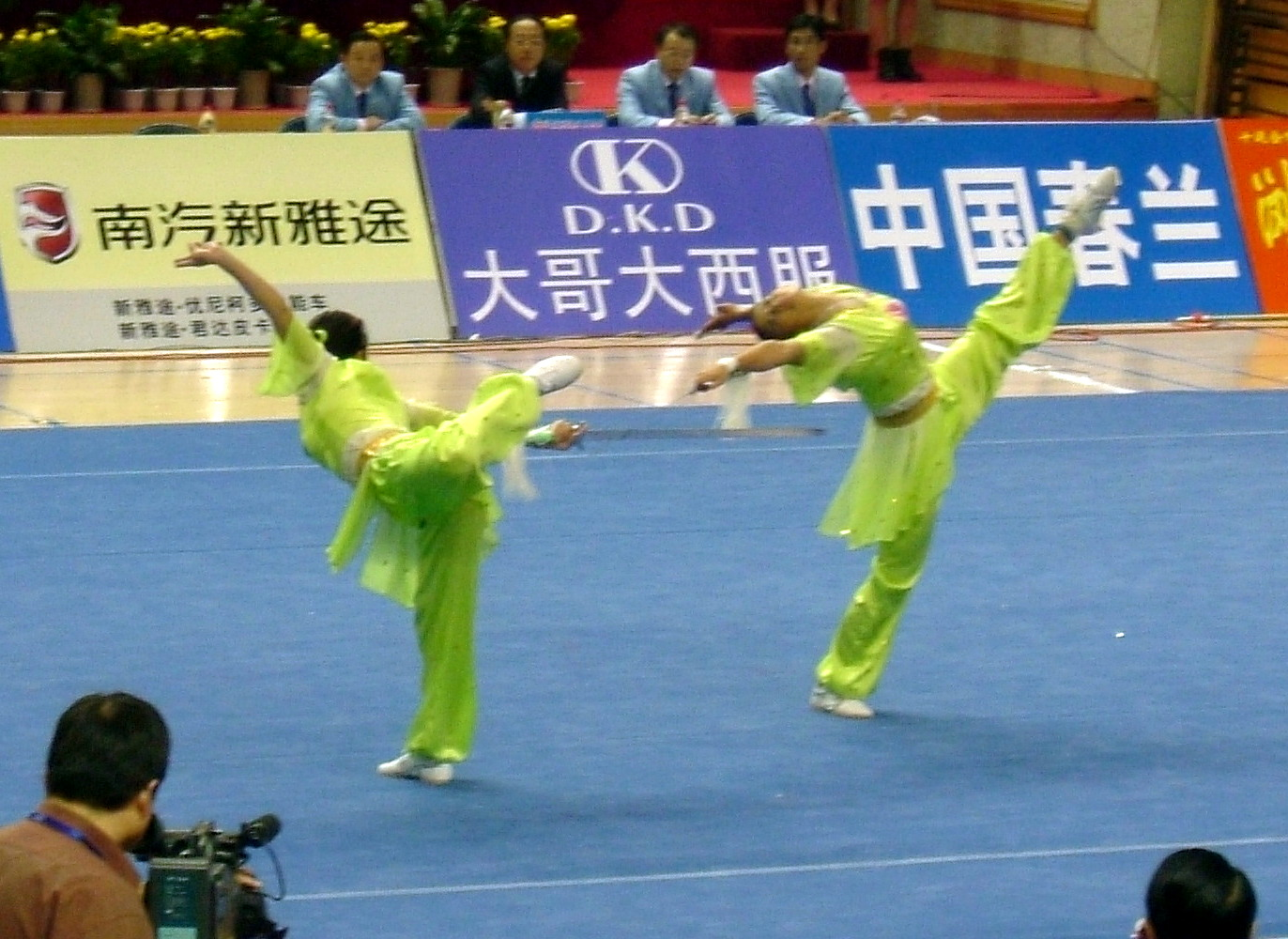
Wushu jian pair event at the 10th All China games

At present, the taijijian forms are normally practiced for exercise like tai chi. The trainings are less on the physical form of the weapon and more on gaining greater balance and coordination through performing the slow movements. Therefore, the tai chi swords for everyday exercises are normally different from the swords mentioned above. Generally speaking, they are not dangerous, round edged without sharp blades, and retractable for convenience.

== Culture and legacy ==
=== Deity ===
==== Myth ====
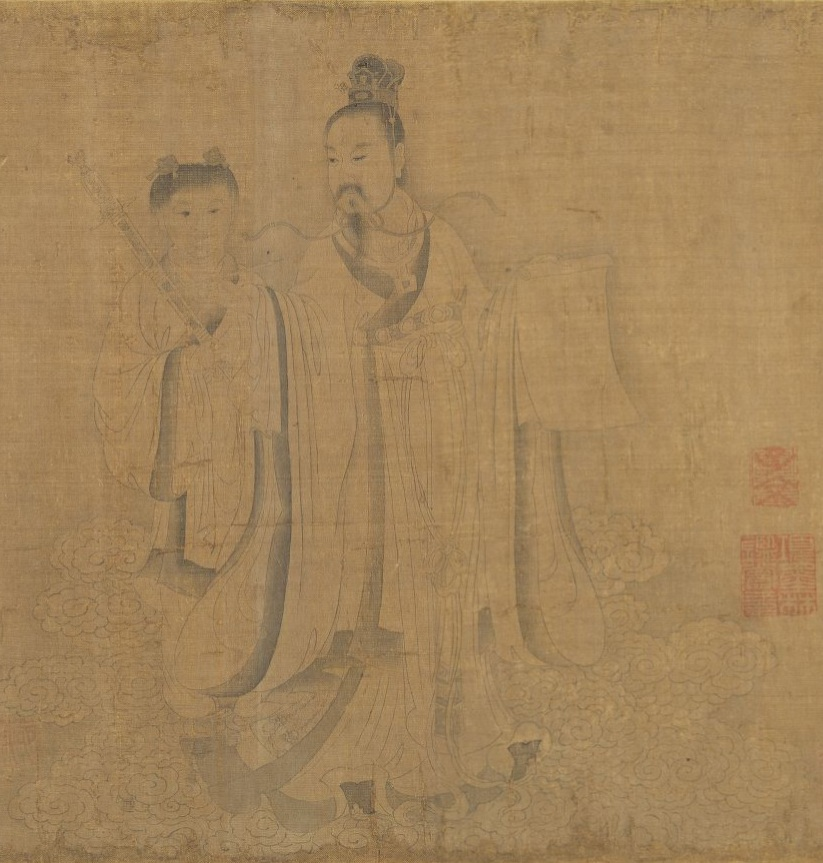
The page behind Shao Siming held Shao Siming's Jian.

In Chinese mythology, the two deities of destiny are "Siming" (司命), namely Da Siming (大司命) and Shao Siming (少司命). Shao Siming's weapon is a long Jian.

==== Taoism ====
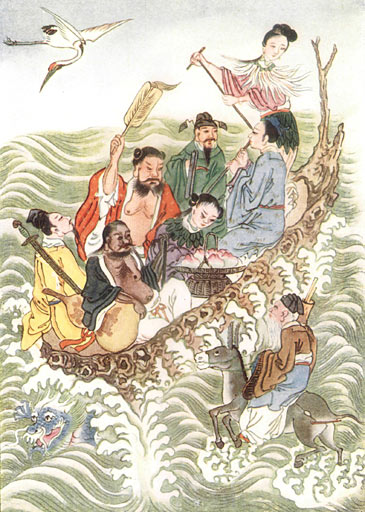
"The Eight Immortals Crossing the Sea." The figure on the lower left wears a jian on his back

There are several Taoist immortals who are associated with the jian. One example is Lü Dongbin.

==== Chinese Buddhism ====
The bodhisattva Mañjuśrī (Ch: 文殊 Wénshū) is often depicted holding a jian, which is then referred to as the "sword of wisdom".

=== Wuxia ===
Jian frequently appear in wuxia fiction and films. The swords or the techniques used to wield them may be effectively or explicitly supernatural, and the quest for such swords or techniques may be a major plot element.

== See also ==
- Chinese swords
- Dao (Chinese sword)
- Jian (sword breaker)
- Kung fu
- Taijijian
- Khanda
- Tsurugi (Japanese sword)
- World Jianshu League
- Wudang Mountains
- Wushu (sport)
- Zhang Sanfeng
- Shuangshou jian
- Shao Siming
