= List of Vietnam world champions in sports =

This is a list of Vietnam world champions in sports, excluding those from youth categories and youth tournaments.

Note: Only world championships organized and/or sanctioned by the respective world's top governing sports bodies are cited.

Date	Championship	Location	Sport	Event	Name
21/11/1993-27/11/1993	1993 World Wushu Championships	Kuala Lumpur, Malaysia	Wushu	Women's Daoshu	Nguyễn Thúy Hiền
21/11/1993-27/11/1993	1993 World Wushu Championships	Kuala Lumpur, Malaysia	Wushu	Men's sanda 56 kg	Mai Thanh Ba
03/11/1997-08/11/1997	1997 World Wushu Championships	Rome, Italy	Wushu	Women's Qiangshu	Nguyễn Thúy Hiền
03/11/1997-08/11/1997	1997 World Wushu Championships	Rome, Italy	Wushu	Men's sanda 56 kg	Đào Việt Lập
02/11/1999-07/11/1999	1999 World Wushu Championships	Hong Kong, China	Wushu	Women's Changquan	Nguyễn Thúy Hiền
02/11/1999-07/11/1999	1999 World Wushu Championships	Hong Kong, China	Wushu	Women's Gunshu	Đàm Thanh Xuân
02/11/1999-07/11/1999	1999 World Wushu Championships	Hong Kong, China	Wushu	Women's Nangun	Nguyễn Phương Lan
15/07/2000-20/07/2000	2000 Shuttlecock World Championships	Újszász, Hungary	Shuttlecock	Men's Singles	Nguyễn Minh Tâm
15/07/2000-20/07/2000	2000 Shuttlecock World Championships	Újszász, Hungary	Shuttlecock	Men's Doubles	Nguyễn Minh Tâm; Đào Thái Hoàng Phúc
15/07/2000-20/07/2000	2000 Shuttlecock World Championships	Újszász, Hungary	Shuttlecock	Men's Team	Nguyễn Minh Tâm; Đào Thái Hoàng Phúc; Nguyễn Minh Thắm; Nguyễn Đình Huy
15/07/2000-20/07/2000	2000 Shuttlecock World Championships	Újszász, Hungary	Shuttlecock	Women's Doubles	Nguyễn Thị Thanh Nga; Nguyễn Thị Liên
15/07/2000-20/07/2000	2000 Shuttlecock World Championships	Újszász, Hungary	Shuttlecock	Mixed Doubles	Nguyễn Minh Thắm; Nguyễn Thị Thanh Nga
14/11/2000-19/11/2000	2000 World Pencak Silat Championship	Jakarta, Indonesia	Pencak Silat	Men's Tanding Class H (80–85 kg)	Nguyễn Văn Hùng
14/11/2000-19/11/2000	2000 World Pencak Silat Championship	Jakarta, Indonesia	Pencak Silat	Women's Tanding Class A (45–50 kg)	Lê Thị Hằng
14/11/2000-19/11/2000	2000 World Pencak Silat Championship	Jakarta, Indonesia	Pencak Silat	Women's Tanding Class B (50–55 kg)	Nguyễn Ngọc Anh
14/11/2000-19/11/2000	2000 World Pencak Silat Championship	Jakarta, Indonesia	Pencak Silat	Women's Tanding Class C (55–60 kg)	Trịnh Thị Mùi
14/11/2000-19/11/2000	2000 World Pencak Silat Championship	Jakarta, Indonesia	Pencak Silat	Women's Tanding Class D (60–65 kg)	Đặng Thị Thúy
15/11/2000-19/11/2000	2000 King's Cup Sepaktakraw World Championship	Bangkok, Thailand	Sepaktakraw	Women's Regu	Trần Thị Vui; Hoàng Thị Thái Xuân; Lưu Thị Thanh; Nguyễn Thúy Vinh
17/09/2001-22/09/2001	2001 Shuttlecock World Championships	Wuxi, Jiangsu, China	Shuttlecock	Men's Singles	Nguyễn Minh Tâm
17/09/2001-22/09/2001	2001 Shuttlecock World Championships	Wuxi, Jiangsu, China	Shuttlecock	Men's Doubles	Nguyễn Minh Tâm; Nguyễn Đình Huy
17/09/2001-22/09/2001	2001 Shuttlecock World Championships	Wuxi, Jiangsu, China	Shuttlecock	Men's Team	Phạm Minh Hùng; Nguyễn Đình Huy; Nguyễn Minh Tâm; Nguyễn Tuyết Cương
17/09/2001-22/09/2001	2001 Shuttlecock World Championships	Wuxi, Jiangsu, China	Shuttlecock	Women's Doubles	Nguyễn Thị Thanh Nga; Bùi Thị Diệu Hiền
17/09/2001-22/09/2001	2001 Shuttlecock World Championships	Wuxi, Jiangsu, China	Shuttlecock	Mixed Doubles	Nguyễn Tuyết Cương; Bùi Thị Diệu Hiền
31/10/2001-05/11/2001	2001 World Wushu Championships	Yerevan, Armenia	Wushu	Men's Sanda 56 kg	Diệp Bảo Minh
31/10/2001-05/11/2001	2001 World Wushu Championships	Yerevan, Armenia	Wushu	Men's Nandao	Trần Trọng Tuấn
31/10/2001-05/11/2001	2001 World Wushu Championships	Yerevan, Armenia	Wushu	Men's Nangun	Lê Quang Huy
31/10/2001-05/11/2001	2001 World Wushu Championships	Yerevan, Armenia	Wushu	Women's Changquan (New)	Đàm Thanh Xuân
31/10/2001-05/11/2001	2001 World Wushu Championships	Yerevan, Armenia	Wushu	Women's Changquan (Old)	Nguyễn Thúy Hiền
31/10/2001-05/11/2001	2001 World Wushu Championships	Yerevan, Armenia	Wushu	Women's Daoshu (New)	Nguyễn Thúy Hiền
31/10/2001-05/11/2001	2001 World Wushu Championships	Yerevan, Armenia	Wushu	Women's Qiangshu (Old)	Nguyễn Thúy Hiền
31/10/2001-05/11/2001	2001 World Wushu Championships	Yerevan, Armenia	Wushu	Women's Daoshu (Old)	Đàm Thanh Xuân
21/11/2001-26/11/2001	2001 IFBB Men's World Amateur Bodybuilding Championships	Yangon, Myanmar	Bodybuilding	Men's Bodybuilding Flyweight	Phạm Văn Mách
14/12/2002-21/12/2002	2002 World Pencak Silat Championship	Penang, Malaysia	Pencak Silat	Women's Seni ganda	Nguyễn Hồng Nhung; Nguyễn Hải Yến
14/12/2002-21/12/2002	2002 World Pencak Silat Championship	Penang, Malaysia	Pencak Silat	Women's Seni regu	Nguyễn Hồng Nhung; Nguyễn Hải Yến; Lý Thị Kim
14/12/2002-21/12/2002	2002 World Pencak Silat Championship	Penang, Malaysia	Pencak Silat	Men's Tanding Class E (65–70 kg)	Lê Anh Tuấn
14/12/2002-21/12/2002	2002 World Pencak Silat Championship	Penang, Malaysia	Pencak Silat	Men's Tanding Class F (70−75 kg)	Đinh Công Sơn
14/12/2002-21/12/2002	2002 World Pencak Silat Championship	Penang, Malaysia	Pencak Silat	Men's Tanding Class G (75–80 kg)	Nguyễn Hữu Long
14/12/2002-21/12/2002	2002 World Pencak Silat Championship	Penang, Malaysia	Pencak Silat	Men's Tanding Class H (80–85 kg)	Nguyễn Văn Hùng
14/12/2002-21/12/2002	2002 World Pencak Silat Championship	Penang, Malaysia	Pencak Silat	Women's Tanding Class A (45–50 kg)	Lê Thị Hằng
14/12/2002-21/12/2002	2002 World Pencak Silat Championship	Penang, Malaysia	Pencak Silat	Women's Tanding Class C (55–60 kg)	Trịnh Thị Mùi
14/12/2002-21/12/2002	2002 World Pencak Silat Championship	Penang, Malaysia	Pencak Silat	Women's Tanding Class D (60–65 kg)	Trịnh Thị Ngà
14/12/2002-21/12/2002	2002 World Pencak Silat Championship	Penang, Malaysia	Pencak Silat	Women's Tanding Class E (65−70 kg)	Lâm Thị Hương
14/12/2002-21/12/2002	2002 World Pencak Silat Championship	Penang, Malaysia	Pencak Silat	Women's Tanding Class F (70–75 kg)	Lê Thị Hồng Ngoan
14/12/2002-21/12/2002	2002 World Pencak Silat Championship	Penang, Malaysia	Pencak Silat	Women's Tanding Class Open	Phạm Thị Huệ
20/12/2002-26/12/2002	2002 Shuttlecock World Championships	Hagen, Germany	Shuttlecock	Men's Singles	Nguyễn Minh Tâm
20/12/2002-26/12/2002	2002 Shuttlecock World Championships	Hagen, Germany	Shuttlecock	Men's Doubles	Phạm Minh Hùng; Nguyễn Đình Huy
20/12/2002-26/12/2002	2002 Shuttlecock World Championships	Hagen, Germany	Shuttlecock	Men's Team	Nguyễn Tuyết Cương; Lê Minh Triều; Phạm Minh Hùng; Nguyễn Đình Huy; Nguyễn Minh Tâm; Trương Tinh Thông
20/12/2002-26/12/2002	2002 Shuttlecock World Championships	Hagen, Germany	Shuttlecock	Men's Team	Nguyễn Tuyết Cương; Bùi Thị Diệu Hiền
03/11/2003-07/11/2003	2003 World Wushu Championships	Macau, China	Wushu	Women's Daoshu	Nguyễn Thúy Hiền
03/11/2003-07/11/2003	2003 World Wushu Championships	Macau, China	Wushu	Women's Nandao	Nguyễn Thị Ngọc Oanh
03/11/2003-07/11/2003	2003 World Wushu Championships	Macau, China	Wushu	Men's Nandao	Trần Trọng Tuấn
03/11/2003-07/11/2003	2003 World Wushu Championships	Macau, China	Wushu	Women's Sanda 56 kg	Ngô Thị Hà
09/12/2004-14/12/2004	2004 World Pencak Silat Championship	Singapore	Pencak Silat	Women's Tanding Class A (45–50 kg)	Lê Thị Hằng
09/12/2004-14/12/2004	2004 World Pencak Silat Championship	Singapore	Pencak Silat	Women's Tanding Class C (55–60 kg)	Lê Thị Thu Hường
09/12/2004-14/12/2004	2004 World Pencak Silat Championship	Singapore	Pencak Silat	Women's Tanding Class F (70–75 kg)	Lê Thị Hồng Ngoan
09/12/2004-14/12/2004	2004 World Pencak Silat Championship	Singapore	Pencak Silat	Men's Tanding Class C (55−60 kg)	Nguyễn Ngọc Anh
09/12/2004-14/12/2004	2004 World Pencak Silat Championship	Singapore	Pencak Silat	Men's Tanding Class E (65–70 kg)	Lê Anh Tuấn
09/12/2004-14/12/2004	2004 World Pencak Silat Championship	Singapore	Peencak Silat	Men's Tanding Class F (70−75 kg)	Đinh Công Sơn
09/12/2004-14/12/2004	2004 World Pencak Silat Championship	Singapore	Pencak Silat	Men's Seni tunggal	Nguyễn Việt Anh
09/12/2004-14/12/2004	2004 World Pencak Silat Championship	Singapore	Pencak Silat	Men's Seni regu	Nguyễn Huy Bảo; Nguyễn Đăng Linh; Lê Quang Dũng
04/12/2005-14/12/2005	2005 World Wushu Championships	Ha Noi, Vietnam	Wushu	Women's Sanda 48 kg	Bùi Thị Như Trang
04/12/2005-14/12/2005	2005 World Wushu Championships	Ha Noi, Vietnam	Wushu	Women's Sanda 65 kg	Hà Thị Hạnh
04/12/2005-14/12/2005	2005 World Wushu Championships	Ha Noi, Vietnam	Wushu	Women's Gunshu	Đàm Thanh Xuân
04/12/2005-14/12/2005	2005 World Wushu Championships	Ha Noi, Vietnam	Wushu	Women's Taijijian	Bùi Mai Phương
04/12/2005-14/12/2005	2005 World Wushu Championships	Ha Noi, Vietnam	Wushu	Men's Duilian	Nguyễn Tiến Đạt; Trần Đức Trọng
09/12/2005-14/12/2005	2005 Shuttlecock World Championships	Guangzhou, Guangdong, China	Shuttlecock	Men's Singles	Lê Minh Triều
09/12/2005-14/12/2005	2005 Shuttlecock World Championships	Guangzhou, Guangdong, China	Shuttlecock	Men's Doubles	Nguyễn Tuyết Cương; Phạm Minh Hùng
09/12/2005-14/12/2005	2005 Shuttlecock World Championships	Guangzhou, Guangdong, China	Shuttlecock	Men's Team	Nguyễn Tuyết Cương; Phạm Minh Hùng; Lê Minh Triều; Nguyễn Anh Tuấn
09/12/2005-14/12/2005	2005 Shuttlecock World Championships	Guangzhou, Guangdong, China	Shuttlecock	Women's Singles	Nguyễn Thị Thanh Nga
09/12/2005-14/12/2005	2005 Shuttlecock World Championships	Guangzhou, Guangdong, China	Shuttlecock	Mixed Doubles	Nguyễn Tuyết Cương; Nguyễn Thị Mộng Kiều
07/10/2007-10/10/2007	2007 Shuttlecock World Championships	Szolnok, Hungary	Shuttlecock	Men's Singles	Nguyễn Anh Tuấn
07/10/2007-10/10/2007	2007 Shuttlecock World Championships	Szolnok, Hungary	Shuttlecock	Men's Doubles	Nguyễn Anh Tuấn; Lê Minh Triều
07/10/2007-10/10/2007	2007 Shuttlecock World Championships	Szolnok, Hungary	Shuttlecock	Men's Team	Nguyễn Ngọc Bách; Lê Minh Triều; Nguyễn Tuyết Cương; Phạm Minh Hùng; Lê Huy Minh; Ngô Mạnh Thắng
07/10/2007-10/10/2007	2007 Shuttlecock World Championships	Szolnok, Hungary	Shuttlecock	Women's Doubles	Nguyễn Thị Huyền Trang; Hoàng Thị Hải
07/10/2007-10/10/2007	2007 Shuttlecock World Championships	Szolnok, Hungary	Shuttlecock	Mixed Doubles	Nguyễn Tuyết Cương; Nguyễn Thị Mộng Kiều
21/10/2007-26/10/2007	2007 World Pencak Silat Championship	Pahang, Malaysia	Pencak Silat	Men's Tanding Class A (45–50 kg)	Hà Anh Tuấn
21/10/2007-26/10/2007	2007 World Pencak Silat Championship	Pahang, Malaysia	Pencak Silat	Men's Tanding Class C (55−60 kg)	Nguyễn Bá Trình
21/10/2007-26/10/2007	2007 World Pencak Silat Championship	Pahang, Malaysia	Pencak Silat	Men's Tanding Class F (70−75 kg)	Đinh Công Sơn
21/10/2007-26/10/2007	2007 World Pencak Silat Championship	Pahang, Malaysia	Pencak Silat	Men's Tanding Class I (85–90 kg)	Trịnh Hải Vương
21/10/2007-26/10/2007	2007 World Pencak Silat Championship	Pahang, Malaysia	Pencak Silat	Men's Tanding Class J (90–95 kg)	Nguyễn Văn Hùng
21/10/2007-26/10/2007	2007 World Pencak Silat Championship	Pahang, Malaysia	Pencak Silat	Women's Tanding Class B (50–55 kg)	Huỳnh Thị Thu Hồng
21/10/2007-26/10/2007	2007 World Pencak Silat Championship	Pahang, Malaysia	Pencak Silat	Women's Tanding Class D (60–65 kg)	Nguyễn Thị Phương Thúy
21/10/2007-26/10/2007	2007 World Pencak Silat Championship	Pahang, Malaysia	Pencak Silat	Women's Tanding Class F (70−75 kg)	Lê Thị Hồng Ngoan
21/10/2007-26/10/2007	2007 World Pencak Silat Championship	Pahang, Malaysia	Pencak Silat	Men's Seni tunggal	Nguyễn Việt Anh
21/10/2007-26/10/2007	2007 World Pencak Silat Championship	Pahang, Malaysia	Pencak Silat	Men's Seni ganda	Nguyễn Thanh Tùng; Trần Đức Nghĩa
21/10/2007-26/10/2007	2007 World Pencak Silat Championship	Pahang, Malaysia	Pencak Silat	Women's Seni ganda	Trần Thị My; Nguyễn Thị Bình
21/10/2007-26/10/2007	2007 World Pencak Silat Championship	Pahang, Malaysia	Pencak Silat	Women's Seni regu	Trần Thị My; Nguyễn Thị Bình; Ngô Thị Quyên
11/11/2007-17/11/2007	2007 World Wushu Championships	Beijing, China	Wushu	Men's Nandao	Phạm Quốc Khánh
11/11/2007-17/11/2007	2007 World Wushu Championships	Beijing, China	Wushu	Women's Sanda 48 kg	Nguyễn Thị Bích
11/11/2007-17/11/2007	2007 World Wushu Championships	Beijing, China	Wushu	Women's Sanda 60 kg	Lương Thị Hoa
13/11/2008-16/11/2008	2008 World Karate Championships	Tokyo, Japan	Karate	Women's Individual kata	Nguyễn Hoàng Ngân
16/12/2008-18/12/2008	2008 WTF World Taekwondo Poomsae Championships	Ankara, Turkey	Taekwondo	Mixed Doubles	Nguyễn Đình Toàn; Nguyễn Minh Tú
02/07/2009-07/07/2009	2009 King's Cup Sepaktakraw World Championship	Bangkok, Thailand	Sepaktakraw	Women's Hoop	Nguyễn Thái Linh; Nguyễn Thị Minh Trang; Nguyễn Thị Quyên; Nguyễn Thị Hòa; Cao Thị Yến; Trần Thị Thu Hằng
02/07/2009-07/07/2009	2009 King's Cup Sepaktakraw World Championship	Bangkok, Thailand	Sepaktakraw	Women's Regu	Nguyễn Hải Thảo; Nguyễn Thị Bích Thùy; Lưu Thị Thanh
26/07/2009-31/07/2009	2009 WVVF World Vovinam Championships	Ho Chi Minh City, Vietnam	Vovinam	Men's –60 kg	Võ Nguyên Linh
26/07/2009-31/07/2009	2009 WVVF World Vovinam Championships	Ho Chi Minh City, Vietnam	Vovinam	Men's –64 kg	Nguyễn Duy Khánh
26/07/2009-31/07/2009	2009 WVVF World Vovinam Championships	Ho Chi Minh City, Vietnam	Vovinam	Men's –77 kg	Phạm Hữu Châu
26/07/2009-31/07/2009	2009 WVVF World Vovinam Championships	Ho Chi Minh City, Vietnam	Vovinam	Women's –51 kg	Trần Thị Thanh Chúc
26/07/2009-31/07/2009	2009 WVVF World Vovinam Championships	Ho Chi Minh City, Vietnam	Vovinam	Women's –54 kg	Phạm Thị Ngọc Hân
26/07/2009-31/07/2009	2009 WVVF World Vovinam Championships	Ho Chi Minh City, Vietnam	Vovinam	Women's –60 kg	Nguyễn Thị Quyền Châu
26/07/2009-31/07/2009	2009 WVVF World Vovinam Championships	Ho Chi Minh City, Vietnam	Vovinam	Women's –65 kg	Trần Thị Phương Dung
26/07/2009-31/07/2009	2009 WVVF World Vovinam Championships	Ho Chi Minh City, Vietnam	Vovinam	Men's Five-gate form	Huỳnh Khắc Nguyên
26/07/2009-31/07/2009	2009 WVVF World Vovinam Championships	Ho Chi Minh City, Vietnam	Vovinam	Men's Ten-technique, eight-principle form	Phạm Văn Thắng
26/07/2009-31/07/2009	2009 WVVF World Vovinam Championships	Ho Chi Minh City, Vietnam	Vovinam	Men's Sun-moon broadsword form	Huỳnh Khắc Nguyên
26/07/2009-31/07/2009	2009 WVVF World Vovinam Championships	Ho Chi Minh City, Vietnam	Vovinam	Men's Ying-yang sword form	Đinh Thiên Long
26/07/2009-31/07/2009	2009 WVVF World Vovinam Championships	Ho Chi Minh City, Vietnam	Vovinam	Women's Aspect broadsword single form	Hứa Lê Cẩm Xuân
26/07/2009-31/07/2009	2009 WVVF World Vovinam Championships	Ho Chi Minh City, Vietnam	Vovinam	Women's Dragon-tiger form	Phạm Thị Phượng
26/07/2009-31/07/2009	2009 WVVF World Vovinam Championships	Ho Chi Minh City, Vietnam	Vovinam	Women's Dual knife form	Huỳnh Thị Kim Tuyền
26/07/2009-31/07/2009	2009 WVVF World Vovinam Championships	Ho Chi Minh City, Vietnam	Vovinam	Women's Dual sword form	Phạm Thị Bích Phượng
26/07/2009-31/07/2009	2009 WVVF World Vovinam Championships	Ho Chi Minh City, Vietnam	Vovinam	Women's Ying-yang sword form	Mai Thị Kim Thùy
26/07/2009-31/07/2009	2009 WVVF World Vovinam Championships	Ho Chi Minh City, Vietnam	Vovinam	Men's Pair knife form	Võ Trần Hoàng Mai; Trần Thanh Sơn
26/07/2009-31/07/2009	2009 WVVF World Vovinam Championships	Ho Chi Minh City, Vietnam	Vovinam	Men's Pair machete form	Lâm Đông Vượng; Trần Thế Thường
26/07/2009-31/07/2009	2009 WVVF World Vovinam Championships	Ho Chi Minh City, Vietnam	Vovinam	Women's Pair sword form	Phạm Thị Phượng; Phạm Thị Bích Phượng
26/07/2009-31/07/2009	2009 WVVF World Vovinam Championships	Ho Chi Minh City, Vietnam	Vovinam	Mixed Female self-defense	Nguyễn Văn Cường; Phạm Thị Phượng
26/07/2009-31/07/2009	2009 WVVF World Vovinam Championships	Ho Chi Minh City, Vietnam	Vovinam	Men's Leg-attack technique	Huỳnh Khắc Nguyên; Phan Ngọc Tới; Nguyễn Văn Cường; Nguyễn Bình Định
26/07/2009-31/07/2009	2009 WVVF World Vovinam Championships	Ho Chi Minh City, Vietnam	Vovinam	Men's Multiple training with weapon	Hồ Chí Hải; Phan Ngọc Tới; Nguyễn Ngọc Tài; Đào Mạnh Nghĩa
26/07/2009-31/07/2009	2009 WVVF World Vovinam Championships	Ho Chi Minh City, Vietnam	Vovinam	Women's Multiple training with weapon	Nguyễn Bình Định; Lê Đức Duy; Lê Phi Bảo; Phạm Thị Bích Phượng
03/11/2009-08/11/2009	2009 WBPF World Men's Bodybuilding Championships	Dubai, United Arab Emirates	Bodybuilding	Men's Bodybuilding 55 kg	Phạm Văn Mách
01/12/2009-03/12/2009	2009 WTF World Taekwondo Poomsae Championships	Cairo, Egypt	Taekwondo	Men's Doubles	Nguyễn Đình Toàn; Nguyễn Minh Tú
01/12/2009-03/12/2009	2009 WTF World Taekwondo Poomsae Championships	Cairo, Egypt	Taekwondo	Men's Team	Nguyễn Đình Toàn; Vũ Thành Dương; Lê Trung Anh
08/07/2010-14/07/2010	2010 Shuttlecock World Championships	Guangzhou, China	Shuttlecock	Men's Doubles	Lê Minh Triều; Nguyễn Tuyết Cương
08/07/2010-14/07/2010	2010 Shuttlecock World Championships	Guangzhou, China	Shuttlecock	Mixed Doubles	Nguyễn Thị Thủy Tiên; Nguyễn Tuyết Cương
08/07/2010-14/07/2010	2010 Shuttlecock World Championships	Guangzhou, China	Shuttlecock	Women's Team	Nguyễn Thị Thủy Tiên; Lê Thị Bé Sáu; Trịnh Thị Nga; Nguyễn Thị Thanh; Hoàng Thị Trà My; Hoàng Thị Hải
27/07/2010-01/08/2010	2010 King's Cup Sepaktakraw World Championship	Chiangmai, Thailand	Sepaktakraw	Women's Regu	Nguyễn Hải Thảo; Nguyễn Thị Bích Thùy; Lưu Thị Thanh; Nguyễn Thịnh Thu Ba
08/10/2010-10/10/2010	2010 WTF World Taekwondo Poomsae Championships	Tashkent, Uzbekistan	Taekwondo	Mixed Doubles	Nguyễn Đình Toàn; Nguyễn Minh Tú
08/10/2010-10/10/2010	2010 WTF World Taekwondo Poomsae Championships	Tashkent, Uzbekistan	Taekwondo	Women's Team	Nguyễn Thị Thu Ngân; Châu Tuyết Vân; Nguyễn Thị Lệ Kim
27/10/2010-31/10/2010	2010 WBPF World Men's Bodybuilding Championships	Varabasi, India	Bodybuilding	Men's Bodybuilding 55 kg	Phạm Văn Mách
12/12/2010-17/12/2010	2010 World Pencak Silat Championship	Jakarta, Indonesia	Pencak Silat	Men's Tanding Class B (50–55 kg)	Trần Văn Toàn
12/12/2010-17/12/2010	2010 World Pencak Silat Championship	Jakarta, Indonesia	Pencak Silat	Men's Tanding Class C (55−60 kg)	Nguyễn Bá Trình
12/12/2010-17/12/2010	2010 World Pencak Silat Championship	Jakarta, Indonesia	Pencak Silat	Men's Tanding Class G (75–80 kg)	Vũ Thế Hoàng
12/12/2010-17/12/2010	2010 World Pencak Silat Championship	Jakarta, Indonesia	Pencak Silat	Men's Tanding Class Open (+95 kg)	Trần Huỳnh Thanh Quốc
12/12/2010-17/12/2010	2010 World Pencak Silat Championship	Jakarta, Indonesia	Pencak Silat	Women's Tanding Class A (45–50 kg)	Lê Thị Phi Nga
12/12/2010-17/12/2010	2010 World Pencak Silat Championship	Jakarta, Indonesia	Pencak Silat	Women's Tanding Class D (60–65 kg)	Nguyễn Thị Yến
12/12/2010-17/12/2010	2010 World Pencak Silat Championship	Jakarta, Indonesia	Pencak Silat	Women's Tanding Class E (65−70 kg)	Trần Thùy Minh Lý
12/12/2010-17/12/2010	2010 World Pencak Silat Championship	Jakarta, Indonesia	Pencak Silat	Women's Tanding Class F (70−75 kg)	Trần Thị Luyến
27/07/2011-31/07/2011	2011 WVVF World Vovinam Championships	Ho Chi Minh City, Vietnam	Vovinam	Men's –54 kg	Trần Ngọc Nam
27/07/2011-31/07/2011	2011 WVVF World Vovinam Championships	Ho Chi Minh City, Vietnam	Vovinam	Men's –57 kg	Võ Nguyên Linh
27/07/2011-31/07/2011	2011 WVVF World Vovinam Championships	Ho Chi Minh City, Vietnam	Vovinam	Men's –60 kg	Nguyễn Duy Khánh
27/07/2011-31/07/2011	2011 WVVF World Vovinam Championships	Ho Chi Minh City, Vietnam	Vovinam	Men's –72 kg	Danh Tâm
27/07/2011-31/07/2011	2011 WVVF World Vovinam Championships	Ho Chi Minh City, Vietnam	Vovinam	Men's –82 kg	Võ Văn Tuấn
27/07/2011-31/07/2011	2011 WVVF World Vovinam Championships	Ho Chi Minh City, Vietnam	Vovinam	Women's –48 kg	Nguyễn Thị Ngọc Truyển
27/07/2011-31/07/2011	2011 WVVF World Vovinam Championships	Ho Chi Minh City, Vietnam	Vovinam	Women's –51 kg	Trần Khánh Trang
27/07/2011-31/07/2011	2011 WVVF World Vovinam Championships	Ho Chi Minh City, Vietnam	Vovinam	Women's –60 kg	Nguyễn Thị Kim Hoàng
27/07/2011-31/07/2011	2011 WVVF World Vovinam Championships	Ho Chi Minh City, Vietnam	Vovinam	Women's –65 kg	Phương Thị Thỏa
27/07/2011-31/07/2011	2011 WVVF World Vovinam Championships	Ho Chi Minh City, Vietnam	Vovinam	Men's Sun-moon broadsword form	Huỳnh Khắc Nguyên
27/07/2011-31/07/2011	2011 WVVF World Vovinam Championships	Ho Chi Minh City, Vietnam	Vovinam	Men's Five-gate form	Huỳnh Khắc Nguyên
27/07/2011-31/07/2011	2011 WVVF World Vovinam Championships	Ho Chi Minh City, Vietnam	Vovinam	Women's Aspect broadsword single form	Hứa Lê Cẩm Xuân
27/07/2011-31/07/2011	2011 WVVF World Vovinam Championships	Ho Chi Minh City, Vietnam	Vovinam	Women's Dual knife form	Mai Thị Kim Thùy
27/07/2011-31/07/2011	2011 WVVF World Vovinam Championships	Ho Chi Minh City, Vietnam	Vovinam	Men's Pair machete form	Lâm Đông Vượng; Trần Thế Thường
27/07/2011-31/07/2011	2011 WVVF World Vovinam Championships	Ho Chi Minh City, Vietnam	Vovinam	Women's Pair sword form	Phạm Thị Bích Phượng; Trương Thạnh
27/07/2011-31/07/2011	2011 WVVF World Vovinam Championships	Ho Chi Minh City, Vietnam	Vovinam	Men's Leg-attack technique	Nguyễn Bình Định; Nguyễn Văn Cường; Phan Ngọc Tới; Huỳnh Khắc Nguyên
27/07/2011-31/07/2011	2011 WVVF World Vovinam Championships	Ho Chi Minh City, Vietnam	Vovinam	Men's Multiple training with weapon	Hồ Chí Hải; Đào Mạnh Nghĩa; Dương Thanh Tiến; Nguyễn Ngọc Tài
27/07/2011-31/07/2011	2011 WVVF World Vovinam Championships	Ho Chi Minh City, Vietnam	Vovinam	Men's Multiple training without weapon	Trần Công Tạo; Nguyễn Trung Tính; Trần Tấn Lập; Đoàn Hoàng Thâm
27/07/2011-31/07/2011	2011 WVVF World Vovinam Championships	Ho Chi Minh City, Vietnam	Vovinam	Women's Multiple training with weapon	Phạm Thị Bích Phượng; Lê Phi Bảo; Lê Đức Duy; Nguyễn Bình Định
