= Wushu Federation Philippines =

- Sport: Wushu
- Abbreviation: WFP
- Founded: 1987
- Affiliation: International Wushu Federation
- Regional affiliation: Wushu Federation of Asia
- Headquarters: Manila, Philippines
- President: Freddie Jalasco
- Secretary: Julian Camacho

Official website
- www.wushufederation.ph
- (Philippines)

The Wushu Federation Philippines, Inc. (WFP) is the official national governing body for Wushu in the Philippines under the International Wushu Federation. The WFP is a regular member of Philippine Olympic Committee as NSA or National Sports Association.

In 2008, the WFP was recognized as the "National Sports Association of the Year" by the Philippine Sportswriters Association (PSA) due to the impressive achievements of nanquan athlete Willy Wang at the 2007 World Wushu Championships and the 2008 Beijing Wushu Tournament. In 2016, the federation won the same reward due to the double gold medal victories of sanda athletes Divine Wally and Arnel Mandal at the 2015 World Wushu Championships held in Jakarta, Indonesia as well as the several victories of Daniel Parantac at the 2015 Southeast Asian Games.

== Philippines at the World Wushu Championships ==
Philippines at the World Wushu Championships
- IOC code: PHI
- Medals Ranked 9th: Gold 17 Silver 19 Bronze 33 Total 69

World Wushu Championships appearances (overview)
- 1991 1993 1995 1997 1999 2001 2003 2005 2007 2009 2011 2013 2015 2017 2019

The Philippines has been very successful at the World Wushu Championships among various other international wushu competitions.

The International Wushu Federation does not publish all-time medal tables or medal statistics per each national federation. The IWUF only publishes individual championships results and thus the tables below are compilations of those results.

=== Medals by Championships ===
Games	Gold	Silver	Bronze	Total	Gold medals	Total Medals	References
(China) 1991 Beijing	1	1	3	5	7	5	
(Malaysia) 1993 Kuala Lumpur	1	1	2	4	8	9	
(United States) 1995 Baltimore	2	1	3	6	8	7	
(Italy) 1997 Rome	1	1	3	5	9	6	
(Hong Kong) 1999 Hum Hong Bay	0	1	3	4	13	8	
(Armenia) 2001 Yerevan	0	0	0	0	-	-	
2003 Macau	2	2	4	8	7	5	
(Vietnam) 2005 Hanoi	3	1	1	5	4	10	
(China) 2007 Beijing	1	2	2	5	9	10	
(Canada) 2009 Toronto	0	0	0	0	-	-	
(Turkey) 2011 Ankara	2	2	4	8	5	6	
(Malaysia) 2013 Kuala Lumpur	1	2	3	6	10	10	
(Indonesia) 2015 Jakarta	2	2	1	5	8	12	
(Russia) 2017 Kazan	0	2	2	4	16	15	
(China) 2019 Shanghai	1	1	2	4	12	12	
(United States) 2021 Dallas	Future event						
Total	17	19	33	69	9	10	

== Notable athletes ==
=== Taolu ===
- Agatha Wong
- Daniel Parantac

=== Sanda ===
- Amado Benito Jr.
- Eduard Folayang
- Mark Eddiva
