= Wushu at the 2002 Asian Games – Women's nanquan combined =

Women's nanquan combined at the 2002 Asian Games
- Venue: Minseok Sports Center
- Dates: 11–13 October 2002
- Competitors: 10 from 10 nations

Medalists
gold medal	Huang Chunni	China
silver medal	Nguyễn Thị Ngọc Oanh	Vietnam
bronze medal	Swe Swe Thant	Myanmar

The women's nanquan three events combined competition (Nanquan, Nandao and Nangun) at the 2002 Asian Games in Busan, South Korea was held from 11 to 13 October at the Dongseo University Minseok Sports Center.

== Schedule ==
All times are Korea Standard Time (UTC+09:00)

Date	Time	Event
Friday, 11 October 2002	12:30	Nanquan
Saturday, 12 October 2002	09:00	Nangun
Sunday, 13 October 2002	09:00	Nandao

== Results ==
Rank	Athlete	Nanquan	Nangun	Nandao	Total
1st place, gold medalist(s)	Huang Chunni (CHN)	9.51	9.53	9.51	28.55
2nd place, silver medalist(s)	Nguyễn Thị Ngọc Oanh (VIE)	9.35	9.38	9.38	28.11
3rd place, bronze medalist(s)	Swe Swe Thant (MYA)	9.33	9.36	9.37	28.06
4	Shih Fang-chi (TPE)	9.33	9.35	9.35	28.03
5	Lily So (PHI)	9.28	9.33	9.31	27.92
6	Angie Tsang (HKG)	9.26	9.31	9.30	27.87
7	Sachiko Takeda (JPN)	9.26	9.26	9.26	27.78
8	Cha Yen-mi (KOR)	9.23	9.25	9.21	27.69
9	Voon Keh Li (MAS)	9.18	9.20	9.18	27.56
10	Mak Sut Fan (MAC)	8.70	8.75	8.73	26.18
