= Arvin Ting =

Filipino wushu practitioner

Personal information
- Born: 1988 (age 37–38) Binondo, Philippines
- Education: Miami University (BA)

Sport
- Sport: Wushu
- Event(s): Changquan, Daoshu, Gunshu
- Team: Philippines Wushu Team
- Coached by: Samson Co
Medal record
Representing Philippines
Men's Wushu Taolu
World Championships
Gold medal – first place	2003 Macau	Daoshu
Asian Games
Bronze medal – third place	2002 Busan	CQ All-around
Asian Championships
Gold medal – first place	2004 Yangon	Gunshu
Silver medal – second place	2004 Yangon	Changquan
Bronze medal – third place	2004 Yangon	Daoshu
SEA Games
Gold medal – first place	2003 Hanoi	Daoshu
Gold medal – first place	2003 Hanoi	Gunshu
Gold medal – first place	2005 Manila	Daoshu
Bronze medal – third place	2001 Penang	Daoshu
Bronze medal – third place	2005 Manila	Changquan

Arvin Ting is a retired competitive wushu taolu athlete from the Philippines. He is most remembered for being a gold medalist at the World Wushu Championships and a silver medalist at the Asian Games while still being a teenager.

== Career ==
Ting made his international debut at the age of eleven at the 2000 Asian Wushu Championships but did not place. He then competed in the 2001 SEA Games and won a bronze medal in daoshu. During the following year, he competed at the 2002 Asian Games and won the bronze medal in the men's changquan all-around, thus making him the youngest medal winner in Wushu at the Asian Games. A year later at the age of fourteen, he became the world champion in men's daoshu at the 2003 World Wushu Championships. A few weeks later, Ting was a double gold medalist in daoshu and gunshu at the 2003 SEA Games. The following year, he won medals of all colors in the 2004 Asian Wushu Championships. A year later, he competed in the 2005 World Wushu Championships but did not place, but then competed at the 2005 SEA Games and won a gold medal in daoshu and a bronze medal in changquan.

Ting was officially part of the delegation for Philippines at the 2006 Asian Games. He was dropped shortly before the competition started by the secretary general of the Wushu Federation of the Philippines, Julian Camacho, because Ting had not attended practices during the last month. Ting was busy with school work and unofficially retired from competitive wushu in the upcoming months. He along with his brothers, Anthony and Andrew, attended Miami University for college. In 2011, Ting graduated with degrees in accounting and finance and won the President's Distinguished Service Awards. Ting now works as a vice president for Golub Capital.

== See also ==
- List of Asian Games medalists in wushu
