= Ip Man: Kung Fu Master =

2019 film starring Dennis To

- Film poster
- Traditional Chinese: 葉問宗師
- Simplified Chinese: 叶问宗师
- Hanyu Pinyin: Yè Wèn Zōngshī
- Jyutping: Jip6 Man6 Zung1-si1
- Directed by: Li Liming
- Written by: Li Liming; Shi Chingshui
- Produced by: Xu Huidan; Sui Xiaonan; Wang Nan; Zhou Lili
- Starring: Dennis To; Yuan Li Ruoxin; Tong Xiaohu; Yue Dongfeng; Chang Qinyuan; Zhao Xiaoguang; Ren Yu; Michael Wong
- Cinematography: Guo Lei
- Edited by: Huang Rongjun
- Production companies: Baile Media; Beijing Kai Pictures; Beijing Palm Entertainment
- Release date: 23 December 2019
- Running time: 83 minutes
- Country: China
- Box office: $116,781

Ip Man: Kung Fu Master (Chinese: 叶问宗师) is a 2019 Chinese martial arts film co-written and directed by Li Liming and starring Dennis To as Ip Man. It is To's third portrayal of the Hong Kong martial artist, after The Legend Is Born: Ip Man (2010) and Kung Fu League (2018). The film depicts Ip Man's stint as a police officer in Guangzhou before the Chinese Communist Revolution in 1949. The film did not get a theatrical release in China, but instead it was released digitally via streaming on Youku.

== Cast ==
- Dennis To as Ip Man
- Yuan Li Ruoxin as Qing Chuan
- Tong Xiaohu as Director Yuan
- Yue Dongfeng as Qiao Wu
- Chang Qinyuan as Cheung Wing-sing
- Zhao Xiaoguang as Sasaki-Zuo
- Ren Yu as Tokugawa
- Li Rizhu as Ribby
- Michael Wong as San Ye

== Release ==
Ip Man was released in China digitally exclusively on Youku on 23 December 2019. The film was given a limited release in the United States on 11 December 2020.

The film will be available On Demand via Apple TV, Prime Video, Google Play, FandangoNOW, DirecTV, and more on March 9 throughout the United States.

== Reception ==
On Rotten Tomatoes, the film has an aggregated score of 36% based on 11 critic reviews.

Leslie Felperin of The Guardian rated it two out of five stars and wrote "the film takes itself a bit too seriously and reshuffles the deck of plot tropes instead of inventing its own ideas..."

Film Hound Magazine criticized Li's poor storytelling by stating "...perhaps not a great structural storyteller or indeed a fluid one, as evidenced by the amount of scenes that end on a fade to black..." overall giving the film three out of five stars.
