= Park Chan-dae (wushu) =

Korean wushu practitioner

Personal information
- Native name: 박찬대
- Born: 9 June 1973 (age 53) South Korea
- Education: Myongji University
- Occupations: Athlete, martial artist, actor, coach

Sport
- Sport: Wushu
- Events: Changquan, Daoshu, Gunshu
- Team: Korean Wushu Team
- Retired: 2001
- Now coaching: Lee Ha-sung, Cho Seung-jae
Medal record
Representing South Korea
Men's Wushu Taolu
World Championships
Gold medal – first place	1993 Kuala Lumpur	Gunshu
Gold medal – first place	1995 Baltimore	Daoshu
Gold medal – first place	1997 Rome	Daoshu
Gold medal – first place	1999 Hong Kong	Gunshu
Gold medal – first place	2001 Yerevan	Changquan (old)
Gold medal – first place	2001 Yerevan	Gunshu (old)
Silver medal – second place	1995 Baltimore	Changquan
Silver medal – second place	1995 Baltimore	Gunshu
Silver medal – second place	1995 Baltimore	Taijiquan
Silver medal – second place	1997 Rome	Daoshu
Silver medal – second place	1999 Hong Kong	Changquan
Silver medal – second place	1999 Hong Kong	Daoshu
Silver medal – second place	2001 Yerevan	Daoshu (old)
Bronze medal – third place	1993 Kuala Lumpur	Changquan
Bronze medal – third place	1993 Kuala Lumpur	Daoshu
Asian Games
Silver medal – second place	1994 Hiroshima	CQ All-around
Asian Championships
Silver medal – second place	2000 Hanoi	Daoshu
Bronze medal – third place	2000 Hanoi	Gunshu
Bronze medal – third place	2000 Hanoi	All-around
East Asian Games
Silver medal – second place	1997 Busan	CQ All-around
Silver medal – second place	2001 Osaka	CQ All-around
Bronze medal – third place	1993 Shanghai	CQ All-around

Park Chan-dae (Korean: 박찬대; RR: Bak Chandae; born 9 June 1973) is a South Korean retired competitive wushu taolu athlete who is currently the coach of the Korean wushu team. During the 1990s, he became one the most successful wushu athletes outside of China. He was a six-time world champion and has achieved victories at the Asian Games and at the East Asian Games.

== Career ==
=== Competitive history ===
Park started learning Taekwondo at the age of six and eventually discovered wushu through television. He also trained in Hapkido and Muay Thai during his youth. and became a member of the Korea Armed Forces Athletic Corps.

In 1992, Park was selected to become a member of the Korean Wushu Team. His international debut was a year later at the 1993 World Wushu Championships in Kuala Lumpur, Malaysia. At the competition, Park became the first world champion in wushu for South Korea by winning a gold medal in gunshu. He also won bronze medals in changquan and daoshu. Later that year, he won the bronze medal in the men's changquan combined event at the 1993 East Asian Games held in Shanghai, China.

A year later, Park competed in the 1994 Asian Games in Hiroshima, Japan, in the men's changquan combined event. After placing sixth in daoshu, he placed second in both changquan and gunshu, thus winning the silver medal with a combined score of 28.66 under Yuan Wenqing's 29.38. Nearly a year later, Park competed in the 1995 World Wushu Championships in Baltimore, United States, and was a tied gold medalist in daoshu and a silver medalist in changquan, gunshu and taijiquan.

Two years later, Park competed in the 1997 East Asian Games in Busan, South Korea, and won the silver medal in the men's changquan combined event. A few months later, he appeared at the 1997 World Wushu Championships in Rome, Italy, became the world champion in daoshu once again, and won a silver medal in gunshu. Two years later, Park competed at the 1999 World Wushu Championships in Hong Kong and became the world champion in gunshu in addition to winning silver medals in changquan and daoshu. He was also a double medalist at the 2000 Asian Wushu Championships in Hanoi, Vietnam, and won the bronze medal in the changquan all-around event.

The following year, Park first competed in the 2001 East Asian Games in Osaka, Japan, and won another silver medal in changquan. A few months later, he competed using the old contemporary routines in the 2001 World Wushu Championships in Yerevan, Armenia, where he became the world champion in changquan and gunshu and also won a silver medal in daoshu. He announced his retirement from competitive wushu shortly after. Today, Park remains the only male athlete to win six world championship titles at the WWC. (Note: Although many sources claim Park is the most renowned athlete of all-time at the world championships, Vietnamese athlete Nguyễn Thúy Hiền achieved seven gold medals at the WWC in comparison to Park's six gold medals. Despite this, both athletes earned fifteen medals at the WWC.) With this achievement, South Korean media often compared him with wushu athletes from China and, according to Chang-yoon Shin, he is said to have surpassed the career of Li Lianjie (Jet Li).

=== Acting ===
In 1999, it was announced that Park would be a stunt actor in the South Korean movie Saulabi (2002). He went on to appear in Shadowless Sword (2005), Three Kims (2006), and My Mighty Princess (2008).

=== Coaching ===
After retiring from competitive wushu in 2001, Park opened his own wushu school, the Park Chan-dea Wushu Academy, and created the Park Chan-dea Wushu Performance Troupe. He also obtained a position at Howon University to teach wushu. In 2011, he was appointed to be the coach of the Korean Wushu Team. The Korean team's success of one gold and eight bronze medals at the 2011 World Wushu Championships led him to be reelected for the position in 2013 and has stayed the coach ever since. In 2014, Lee Ha-sung, whom Park has taught since an early age, won the gold medal in men's changquan at the 2014 Asian Games, the first gold medal for South Korea in wushu since 2002.

== Awards ==
Awarded by the Republic of Korea:

- Order of Sports Merit, Colossal Medal (1994)
- Order of Sports Merit, Blue Dragon (2004)

== See also ==
- List of Asian Games medalists in wushu
- World Wushu Championships § Statistics
