= Willy Wang (wushu) =

Filipino wushu practitioner

Personal information
- Born: November 12, 1983 (age 42) Fuzhou, Fujian, China
- Occupation(s): Martial artist, athlete, coach, businessman
- Height: 1.6 m (5 ft 3 in)
- Weight: 58 kg (128 lb)

Sport
- Sport: Wushu
- Event(s): Changquan (until 2005); Nanquan (2005–2009)
- Team: Philippines wushu team (1999–2008)
Medal record
Representing Philippines
Men's Wushu Taolu
Olympic Games (unofficial)
Gold medal – first place	2008 Beijing	Nanquan+Nangun
World Championships
Gold medal – first place	2007 Beijing	Nanquan
Silver medal – second place	1999 Hong Kong	Jianshu
Bronze medal – third place	2003 Macau	Qiangshu
Asian Championships
Gold medal – first place	2008 Macau	Nandao
Bronze medal – third place	2004 Yangon	Jianshu
Bronze medal – third place	2008 Macau	Nanquan
SEA Games
Gold medal – first place	2001 Kuala Lumpur	Qiangshu
Gold medal – first place	2003 Hanoi	Jianshu
Gold medal – first place	2003 Hanoi	Qiangshu
Gold medal – first place	2005 Manila	Jianshu
Gold medal – first place	2005 Manila	Qiangshu
Gold medal – first place	2007 Nakhon Ratchasima	Nanquan
Silver medal – second place	2003 Hanoi	Changquan
Bronze medal – third place	2001 Kuala Lumpur	Jianshu

Willy Reyes Wang (born November 12, 1983) is a former wushu taolu athlete from the Philippines. He is one of the most decorated Filipino wushu athletes of all time in international competition and became especially renowned after his gold medal victory at the 2008 Beijing Wushu Tournament.

== Career ==
For most of his career, Wang was a changquan athlete who also practiced jianshu and qiangshu. He made his international debut at the 1999 World Wushu Championships in Hong Kong and won the silver medal in jianshu. He then appeared at the 2001 Southeast Asian Games where he impressively won a gold and a bronze medal. In 2003, he won the bronze medal in qiangshu at the 2003 World Wushu Championships, and was a double gold medalist at the 2003 Southeast Asian Games. He extended his championship titles in the jianshu and qiangshu events once again at the 2005 Southeast Asian Games. A few days later, he competed at the 2005 World Wushu Championships but did not place.

After his competitions in 2005, Wang transitioned to training nanquan after having an extensive competitive career in changquan. His first experience in the nanquan category was at the 2006 Asian Games and placed seventh in the nanquan combined event. He considerably improved, and a year later in the 2007 World Wushu Championships, Wang won the gold medal in nanquan, placed fourth in nandao, and sixth in nangun. From these placements, he was the most consistent athlete at the competition and thus qualified for the Beijing Wushu Tournament. A month after the 2007 world championship, he won the gold medal in the nanquan event at the 2007 Southeast Asian Games.

The Philippines delegation at the 2008 Summer Olympics in Beijing was unable to win a single medal for the third consecutive Olympiad. At the Beijing Wushu Tournament, Wang made up for this loss in the men's nanquan medal event and won the gold medal. Wang's victory was celebrated throughout the Philippines as he became the second person to win a gold medal at an Olympic-style event for the Philippines; albeit an unofficial event.

In 2009, Wang announced his retirement from competition. He now runs the Willy Wang Wushu Center, a wushu school located in Manila.
