= 2004 Asian Wushu Championships =

6th edition of the Asian Wushu Championships

- Venue: Thuwunna National Indoor Stadium (1) (capacity: 10,825)
- Location: Yangon, Myanmar
- Start date: November 24, 2004
- End date: November 28, 2004
- Competitors: 500 from 24 nations

The 2004 Asian Wushu Championships was the 6th edition of the Asian Wushu Championships. It was held at the Thuwunna National Indoor Stadium (1) in Yangon, Myanmar from November 24-28, 2004. This was the first time women's sanda was an official event at the Asian Wushu Championships.

== Medal table ==
Taolu only

* Host nation (Myanmar)

Rank	Nation	Gold	Silver	Bronze	Total
1	China (CHN)	9	2	0	11
2	Myanmar*	3	4	4	11
3	Vietnam (VIE)	2	6	5	13
4	Macau (MAC)	2	1	3	6
5	Malaysia (MAS)	1	2	1	4
6	Hong Kong (HKG)	1	1	3	5
7	Philippines (PHI)	1	1	2	4
8	South Korea (KOR)	1	0	0	1
9	Singapore (SGP)	0	2	1	3
10	Chinese Taipei (TPE)	0	1	1	2
11	Indonesia (INA)	0	0	1	1
11	Japan (JPN)	0	0	1	1
Totals (12 entries)		20	20	22	62

== Medalists ==
=== Taolu ===
==== Men ====
Event	Gold	Silver	Bronze
Changquan	Pyi Wai Phyo; Myanmar	Arvin Ting; Philippines	Nguyễn Tiến Đạt; Vietnam
Daoshu	Liu Zhiyong; China	Aung Si Thu; Myanmar	Arvin Ting; Philippines
Gunshu	Arvin Ting; Philippines	To Yu-hang; Hong Kong	Pyi Wai Phyo; Myanmar
Jianshu	Kweon Heung-seok; South Korea	Lim Yew Fai; Malaysia	Willy Wang; Philippines
Qiangshu	Wang Cong; China	Nguyễn Doan Trung; Vietnam	Hei Zhihong; Hong Kong
Nanquan	Su Kefeng; China	Ho Ro Bin; Malaysia	Zaw Zaw Moe; Myanmar; Lê Quang Huy; Vietnam
Nandao	Ho Ro Bin; Malaysia	Zaw Zaw Moe; Myanmar	Lê Quang Huy; Vietnam; Cheng Ka Ho; Hong Kong
Nangun	Song Lin; China	Lê Quang Huy; Vietnam	Zaw Zaw Moe; Myanmar
Taijiquan	Hei Zhihong; Hong Kong	Goh Qiu Bin; Singapore	Chin Foh Nan; Malaysia
Taijijian	Lu Fuxiang; China	Goh Qiu Bin; Singapore	Chan Ching-kuei; Chinese Taipei

==== Women ====
Event	Gold	Silver	Bronze
Changquan	Nguyễn Thị Mỹ Đức; Vietnam	Han Jing; Macau	Đàm Thanh Xuân; Vietnam
Daoshu	Jing Fang; China	Đàm Thanh Xuân; Vietnam	Wong Won Yee; Hong Kong
Gunshu	Đàm Thanh Xuân; Vietnam	Chen Shao-chi; Chinese Taipei	Susyana; Indonesia
Jianshu	Han Jing; Macau	Nguyễn Thị Mỹ Đức; Vietnam	Koh Poh Chin; Singapore
Qiangshu	Ma Lingjuan; China	Nguyễn Thị Mỹ Đức; Vietnam	Han Jing; Macau
Nanquan	Mao Yaqi; China	Swe Swe Thant; Myanmar	Huang Yan Hui; Macau
Nandao	Swe Swe Thant; Myanmar	Nguyễn Thị Ngọc Oanh; Vietnam	Huang Yan Hui; Macau
Nangun	Huang Yan Hui; Macau	Swe Swe Thant; Myanmar	Shinsuke Hayaoka; Japan
Taijiquan	Khaing Khaing Maw; Myanmar	Peng Lili; China	Bùi Mai Phương; Vietnam
Taijijian	Zhang Fang; China	Peng Lili; China	Khaing Khaing Maw; Myanmar
