= 1999 World Wushu Championships =

5th edition of the World Wushu Championships

- Venue: Hong Kong Coliseum (capacity: 12,500)
- Location: Hong Kong, China
- Start date: November 2, 1999
- End date: November 7, 1999
- Competitors: 362 from 55 nations

The 1999 World Wushu Championships was the 5th edition of the World Wushu Championships. It was held at the Hong Kong Coliseum in Hong Kong, from November 2 to November 7, 1999.

== Medal table ==
* Host nation (Hong Kong)

Rank	NOC	Gold	Silver	Bronze	Total
1	China	11	1	0	12
2	Hong Kong*	6	6	5	17
3	Vietnam	3	4	6	13
4	South Korea	2	3	1	6
5	Iran	2	0	1	3
6	Russia	2	0	0	2
7	Macau	1	3	1	5
8	Egypt	1	2	2	5
9	Azerbaijan	1	2	0	3
10	Malaysia	1	0	1	2
11	Ukraine	1	0	0	1
12	Chinese Taipei	0	3	1	4
13	Philippines	0	1	3	4
14	Romania	0	1	2	3
14	United States	0	1	2	3
16	France	0	1	1	2
16	Netherlands	0	1	1	2
16	Singapore	0	1	1	2
19	Turkey	0	1	0	1
20	Japan	0	0	3	3
21	Sweden	0	0	2	2
22	Belarus	0	0	1	1
22	Brazil	0	0	1	1
22	Canada	0	0	1	1
22	Lebanon	0	0	1	1
22	Spain	0	0	1	1
Totals (26 entries)		31	31	38	100

== Medalists ==
=== Men's taolu ===
Event	Gold	Silver	Bronze
Changquan	To Yu-hang; Hong Kong	Park Chan-dae; South Korea	Ryoji Sakuma; Japan
Daoshu	Jian Zengjiao; China	Park Chan-dae; South Korea	Fei Bao Xian; Netherlands
Gunshu	Park Chan-dae; South Korea	Fei Bao Xian; Netherlands	Mark Robert Rosales; Philippines
Jianshu	Cheung Man Keung; Hong Kong	Willy Wang; Philippines	Chow Ting Yu; Hong Kong
Qiangshu	Chow Ting Yu; Hong Kong	Cheung Man Keung; Hong Kong	Kek Hwang Hwa; Malaysia
Nanquan	Chen Lun; China	Liu Chun-wei; Chinese Taipei	Cheng Ka Ho; Hong Kong
Nandao	Ho Ro Bin; Malaysia	Leong Hong Man; Macau	Trần Trọng Tuấn; Vietnam
Nangun	Cheng Ka Ho; Hong Kong	Liu Chun-wei; Chinese Taipei	Leong Hong Man; Macau
Taijiquan	Zou Yunjian; China	Cheung Man Keung; Hong Kong	Toshiya Watanabe; Japan
Taijijian	Kong Xiangdong; China	Yang Seong-chan; South Korea	Bobby Co; Philippines

=== Women's taolu ===
Event	Gold	Silver	Bronze
Changquan	Nguyễn Thúy Hiền; Vietnam	Lo Nga Ching; Hong Kong	Akiko Kawasaki; Japan
Daoshu	Liu Xiaolei; China	Nguyễn Thúy Hiền; Vietnam	Lo Nga Ching; Hong Kong
Gunshu	Đàm Thanh Xuân; Vietnam	Lo Nga Ching; Hong Kong	Katrina Leung; Canada
Jianshu	Chen Ba; China	Lei Fei; Macau	Ng Siu Ching; Hong Kong
Qiangshu	Lei Fei; Macau	Nguyễn Thúy Hiền; Vietnam	Mae Hsu; United States
Nanquan	Ng Siu Ching; Hong Kong	Lei Fei; Macau	Nguyễn Phương Lan; Vietnam
Nandao	Huang Chunni; China	Nguyễn Phương Lan; Vietnam	Angie Tsang; Hong Kong
Nangun	Nguyễn Phương Lan; Vietnam	Angie Tsang; Hong Kong	Nguyễn Thị Ngọc Oanh; Vietnam
Taijiquan	Qiu Huifang; China	Li Fai; Hong Kong	Jennee Sae Tang; Singapore
Taijijian	Li Fai; Hong Kong	Jennee Sae Tang; Singapore	Hsieh Chen-yi; Chinese Taipei

=== Men's sanda ===
Event	Gold	Silver	Bronze
48 kg	Chen Long; China	Rabiea Gamil; Egypt	George Lusadan; Philippines
48 kg	Chen Long; China	Rabiea Gamil; Egypt	Nguyễn Văn Hữu; Vietnam
52 kg	Wang Wenjun; China	Lee Hou-cheng; Chinese Taipei	Nguyễn Chí Sơn; Vietnam
52 kg	Wang Wenjun; China	Lee Hou-cheng; Chinese Taipei	Woo Seung-soo; South Korea
56 kg	Zheng Kunyou; China	İbrahim Özcan; Turkey	Attila Gombos; Romania
56 kg	Zheng Kunyou; China	İbrahim Özcan; Turkey	Đào Việt Lập; Vietnam
60 kg	Kim Gwee-jong; South Korea	Diệp Bảo Minh; Vietnam	Youness Yassine; Lebanon
60 kg	Kim Gwee-jong; South Korea	Diệp Bảo Minh; Vietnam	Rafic Dalle; Sweden
65 kg	Murad Akhadov; Russia	Al Loriaux; United States	Ramón Quina; Spain
65 kg	Murad Akhadov; Russia	Al Loriaux; United States	Mahmoud Zinhem; Egypt
70 kg	Janpolad Budagov; Azerbaijan	Xiao Xiaobang; China	Khaled Salah; Egypt
70 kg	Janpolad Budagov; Azerbaijan	Xiao Xiaobang; China	Marius Tiţă; Romania
75 kg	Hossein Ojaghi; Iran	Rassaf Mekhtiyev; Azerbaijan	Vyacheslav Shapovalov; Belarus
75 kg	Hossein Ojaghi; Iran	Rassaf Mekhtiyev; Azerbaijan	Daniel Stenman; Sweden
80 kg	Bozigit Ataev; Russia	Mohamed Selit; Egypt	Stéphane Attelly; France
80 kg	Bozigit Ataev; Russia	Mohamed Selit; Egypt	Cung Le; United States
85 kg	Basel El-Kanany; Egypt	Cătălin Zmărăndescu; Romania	André Assis; Brazil
85 kg	Basel El-Kanany; Egypt	Cătălin Zmărăndescu; Romania	Mohammad Reza Jafari; Iran
90 kg	Chamil Magomedov; Ukraine	Karim Taghbalout; France	None awarded
90 kg	Chamil Magomedov; Ukraine	Karim Taghbalout; France	None awarded
+90 kg	Ali Mirmiran; Iran	Yasef Mekhtiyev; Azerbaijan	None awarded
+90 kg	Ali Mirmiran; Iran	Yasef Mekhtiyev; Azerbaijan	None awarded
