= Wushu at the 2005 SEA Games =

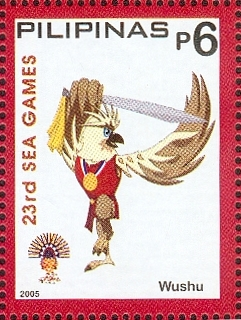
- Logo of wushu at the 2005 Southeast Asian Games on a 2005 stamp of the Philippines
- Venue: EAC Gymnasium
- Location: Ermita, Manila
- Date: November 28–30, 2005

Wushu at the 2005 SEA Games took place in the Emilio Aguinaldo College Gymnasium, in Ermita, Manila, Philippines from November 28–30.

== Medal table ==
* Host nation (Philippines)

Rank	NOC	Gold	Silver	Bronze	Total
1	Philippines (PHI)*	11	4	2	17
2	Vietnam (VIE)	7	8	8	23
3	Myanmar (MYA)	2	3	8	13
4	Singapore (SIN)	1	1	2	4
5	Thailand (THA)	1	0	6	7
6	Indonesia (INA)	0	3	2	5
7	Malaysia (MAS)	0	2	3	5
8	Laos (LAO)	0	1	0	1
Totals (8 entries)		22	22	31	75

== Medalists ==
=== Men's taolu ===
Event	Gold	Silver	Bronze
Changquan	Nguyễn Tiến Đạt; Vietnam	Phi Wai Phyo; Myanmar	Arvin Ting; Philippines
Daoshu	Arvin Ting; Philippines	Ang Eng Chong; Malaysia	Aung Si Thu; Myanmar
Jianshu	Willy Wang; Philippines	Phi Wai Phyo; Myanmar	Lim Yew Fai; Malaysia
Nanquan	Pedro Quina; Philippines	Ho Ro Bin; Malaysia	Sandry Liong; Indonesia
Gunshu	Phi Wai Phyo; Myanmar	Nguyễn Tiến Đạt; Vietnam	Trương Quốc Chí; Vietnam
Qiangshu	Willy Wang; Philippines	Nguyễn Văn Cường; Vietnam	Aung Si Thu; Myanmar
Taijiquan / Taijijan	Gon Qiu Bin; Singapore	Kenneth Lim; Philippines	Chu Mạnh Cường; Vietnam
Duilian	Philippines; Lester Pimentel; Richard Ng	Vietnam; Nguyễn Tiến Đạt; Trần Đức Trọng	Thailand; Somdej Srisuk; Wanchalerm Puangthong
Duilian	Philippines; Lester Pimentel; Richard Ng	Vietnam; Nguyễn Tiến Đạt; Trần Đức Trọng	Indonesia; Heryanto; Sandry Liong

=== Men's sanda ===
Event	Gold	Silver	Bronze
48 kg	Rene Catalan; Philippines	Lê Minh Tùng; Vietnam	Wathana Sasaku; Thailand
48 kg	Rene Catalan; Philippines	Lê Minh Tùng; Vietnam	Pyi Han Tun; Myanmar
56 kg	Trần Nhật Huy; Vietnam	Rexel Nganhayna; Philippines	Maung Maung Han; Myanmar
56 kg	Trần Nhật Huy; Vietnam	Rexel Nganhayna; Philippines	Wichan Toonkratoak; Thailand
60 kg	Wiwat Choo-ubon; Thailand	Phoxay Aphaylath; Laos	Saw Khaing; Myanmar
60 kg	Wiwat Choo-ubon; Thailand	Phoxay Aphaylath; Laos	Mark Eddiva; Philippines
70 kg	Eduard Folayang; Philippines	Nguyễn Đức Trung; Vietnam	Hla Moe; Myanmar
70 kg	Eduard Folayang; Philippines	Nguyễn Đức Trung; Vietnam	Metee Phonork; Thailand

=== Women's taolu ===
Event	Gold	Silver	Bronze
Changquan	Nguyễn Thị Mỹ Đức; Vietnam	Susyana Tjhan; Indonesia	Chai Fong Wei; Malaysia
Changquan	Nguyễn Thị Mỹ Đức; Vietnam	Susyana Tjhan; Indonesia	Đàm Thanh Xuân; Vietnam
Daoshu	Aida Yang; Philippines	Đàm Thanh Xuân; Vietnam	Chai Fong Wei; Malaysia
Gunshu	Đàm Thanh Xuân; Vietnam	Susyana Tjhan; Indonesia	Lâm Kiều Mỹ Dung; Vietnam
Jianshu	Vicky Ting; Philippines	Susyana Tjhan; Indonesia	Nguyễn Thị Mỹ Đức; Vietnam
Nanquan	Ma Swe Swe Thant; Myanmar	Nguyễn Thị Ngọc Oanh; Vietnam	Nguyễn Thị Thuỳ Dương; Vietnam
Qiangshu	Nguyễn Thị Mỹ Đức; Vietnam	Khor Poh Chon; Singapore	Vũ Trà My; Vietnam
Taijiquan / Taijijan	Bùi Mai Phương; Vietnam	Janice Hung; Philippines	Shen Pin Xiu; Singapore
Duilian	Philippines; Aida Yang; Vicky Ting	Myanmar; Ei Khaing Htwe; Ma Swe Swe Thant	Singapore; Deng Ying Zhi; Ng Xin Ni
Duilian	Philippines; Aida Yang; Vicky Ting	Myanmar; Ei Khaing Htwe; Ma Swe Swe Thant	Vietnam; Nguyễn Thị Thuỳ Dương; Vũ Trà My

=== Women's sanda ===
Event	Gold	Silver	Bronze
45 kg	Bùi Thị Như Trang; Vietnam	Jennifer Lagilag; Philippines	Saisawat Boontan; Thailand
45 kg	Bùi Thị Như Trang; Vietnam	Jennifer Lagilag; Philippines	Thin Zar Soe; Myanmar
52 kg	Rhea May Rifani; Philippines	Ngô Thị Hà; Vietnam	Kittika Sitthan; Thailand
52 kg	Rhea May Rifani; Philippines	Ngô Thị Hà; Vietnam	Yar Zar Khaing; Myanmar
