= Lo Nga Ching =

Hong Kong wushu practitioner

Personal information
- Occupation(s): Athlete, martial artist

Sport
- Sport: Wushu
- Event: Changquan
Medal record
Representing Hong Kong
East Asian Games
Silver medal – second place	1997 Busan	Changquan
Representing Hong Kong
Women's Wushu Taolu
World Wushu Championships
Gold medal – first place	2001 Yerevan	Jianshu (old)
Gold medal – first place	2001 Yerevan	Gunshu (old)
Silver medal – second place	1997 Rome	Gunshu
Silver medal – second place	1999 Hong Kong	Changquan
Silver medal – second place	1999 Hong Kong	Gunshu
Bronze medal – third place	1997 Rome	Changquan
Bronze medal – third place	1997 Rome	Daoshu
Bronze medal – third place	1999 Hong Kong	Daoshu
East Asian Games
Silver medal – second place	2001 Osaka	Changquan

Lo Nga Ching (Chinese: 羅雅青; pinyin: Luóyǎqīng) is a retired professional wushu taolu athlete from Hong Kong. She is an eight-time medalist at the World Wushu Championships and is a two-time world champion. She also won two silver medals in women's changquan at the East Asian Games. After retiring, she married He Jing De.
