= Wushu at the 2002 Asian Games – Women's taijiquan combined =

Women's taijiquan combined at the 2002 Asian Games
- Venue: Minseok Sports Center
- Dates: 10–12 October 2002
- Competitors: 15 from 12 nations

Medalists
gold medal	Khaing Khaing Maw	Myanmar
silver medal	Li Fai	Hong Kong
bronze medal	Jessie Liew	Singapore

The women's combined taijiquan and taijijian competition at the 2002 Asian Games in Busan, South Korea was held from 10 to 12 October at the Dongseo University Minseok Sports Center.

== Schedule ==
All times are Korea Standard Time (UTC+09:00)

Date	Time	Event
Thursday, 10 October 2002	10:00	Taijiquan
Saturday, 12 October 2002	11:00	Taijijian

== Results ==
Rank	Athlete	Taijiquan	Taijijian	Total
1st place, gold medalist(s)	Khaing Khaing Maw (MYA)	9.50	9.46	18.96
2nd place, silver medalist(s)	Li Fai (HKG)	9.45	9.38	18.83
3rd place, bronze medalist(s)	Jessie Liew (SIN)	9.46	9.36	18.82
4	Wu I-chi (TPE)	9.43	9.36	18.79
5	Qi Li (CHN)	9.36	9.38	18.74
6	Emi Akazawa (JPN)	9.38	9.31	18.69
7	Song Ri-ma (KOR)	9.35	9.33	18.68
8	Nguyễn Quỳnh Trang (VIE)	9.37	9.28	18.65
8	Wong Pei Ling (MAS)	9.35	9.30	18.65
10	May Lim (PHI)	9.38	9.26	18.64
11	Jennee Sae Tang (SIN)	9.35	9.28	18.63
12	Ha So-hyung (KOR)	9.36	9.26	18.62
13	Wong Leong Nei (MAC)	9.33	9.25	18.58
14	Cheng Ka Wing (HKG)	9.31	9.25	18.56
14	Dwi Arimbi (INA)	9.28	9.28	18.56
