= Chow Ting Yu =

Hong Kong wushu practitioner

Personal information
- Born: 1977 (age 48–49)
- Education: Beijing Sports University

Sport
- Sport: Wushu
- Events: Changquan, Jianshu, Qiangshu
- Team: Hong Kong Wushu Team (1992-2005)
- Coached by: Wu Chenglin
Medal record
Men's Wushu Taolu
Representing Hong Kong
World Championships
Gold medal – first place	1999 Hong Kong	Qiangshu
Gold medal – first place	2003 Macau	Qiangshu
Silver medal – second place	2001 Yerevan	Jianshu (old)
Silver medal – second place	2001 Yerevan	Qiangshu (old)
Silver medal – second place	2003 Macau	Duilian
Bronze medal – third place	1999 Hong Kong	Jianshu
Asian Championships
Silver medal – second place	2000 Hanoi	Qiangshu
Bronze medal – third place	2000 Hanoi	Jianshu

Chow Ting Yu (Chinese: 周定宇; pinyin: Zhōudìngyǔ, born 1977), known professionally as Marvel Chow, is a retired professional wushu taolu athlete and actor from Hong Kong.

== Career ==
=== Wushu ===
In his youth, Chow wanted to pursue a career in badminton and decided to learn wushu when he was 14 on the side to help him improve on his main sport. Unexpectedly, he chose instead to pursue wushu. He went to train at the Beijing Sport University and became a member of the Hong Kong Wushu Team in 1995.

Chow made his international debut at the 1999 World Wushu Championships where he became the world champion in qiangshu and also won a bronze medal in jianshu. Two years later at the 2001 World Wushu Championships, he was a double silver medalist in jianshu and qiangshu. His last competition was at the 2003 World Wushu Championships where he was once again the world champion in qiangshu and a silver medalist in the inaugural rendition of duilian.

=== Acting ===
After retiring from competitive wushu, Chow started practicing wing chun which eventually led to his acting roles starting with Ip Man in 2008.

== Filmography ==
- Ip Man (2008)
- Ip Man: The Final Fight (2013)
- Golden Brother (2014)

== Awards ==
Awards from the Junior Chamber International Hong Kong

- Ten Outstanding Young Persons of Hong Kong: 2011
