= Toshiya Watanabe =

Japanese wushu practitioner

Sport
- Sport: Wushu
- Event(s): Taijiquan, Taijijian
Medal record
Representing Japan
Men's Wushu Taolu
World Championships
| Gold medal – first place | 2003 Macau | Taijijian |
| Silver medal – second place | 1995 Baltimore | Taijiquan |
| Silver medal – second place | 2001 Yerevan | Taijiquan |
| Silver medal – second place | 2001 Yerevan | Taijijian |
| Silver medal – second place | 2003 Macau | Taijiquan |
| Bronze medal – third place | 1997 Rome | Taijiquan |
| Bronze medal – third place | 1999 Hong Kong | Taijiquan |
Asian Games
| Silver medal – second place | 1998 Bangkok | Taijiquan |
Asian Championships
| Gold medal – first place | 2000 Hanoi | Taijijian |
| Bronze medal – third place | 2000 Hanoi | Taijiquan |
East Asian Games
| Silver medal – second place | 1997 Busan | Taijiquan |
| Bronze medal – third place | 2001 Osaka | Taijiquan |

Toshiya Watanabe (Japanese: 渡边俊哉) is a former taijiquan athlete from Japan who was a world champion.

== Career ==
Watanabe's international debut was at the 1995 World Wushu Championships where he won a silver medal in taijiquan and a bronze medal two years later at the 1997 World Wushu Championships. The same year, he won a silver medal at the 1997 East Asian Games. He then achieved another silver medal victory in men's taijiquan at the 1998 Asian Games. The following year, he won a bronze medal at the 1999 World Wushu Championships. A year later, he became the Asian champion in taijiquan and won a bronze medal in taijiquan at the 2000 Asian Wushu Championships. In 2001, he achieved a bronze medal at the 2001 East Asian Games and was a double silver medalist at the 2001 World Wushu Championships. His last competition was at the 2003 World Wushu Championships where he became world champion in taijijian.

== See also ==
- List of Asian Games medalists in wushu
