= Nguyễn Thị Mỹ Đức =

Vietnamese wushu practitioner

Personal information
- Born: 1984 (age 41–42) Hanoi, Vietnam

Sport
- Sport: Wushu
- Event(s): Changquan, Jianshu, Qiangshu
- Team: Vietnam Wushu Team
Medal record
Representing Vietnam
Women's Wushu Taolu
World Championships
Silver medal – second place	2003 Macau	Qiangshu
Silver medal – second place	2005 Hanoi	Qiangshu
Bronze medal – third place	2003 Macau	Changquan
Asian Games
Bronze medal – third place	2002 Busan	CQ All-Around
Asian Championships
Gold medal – first place	2004 Yangon	Changquan
Silver medal – second place	2004 Yangon	Jianshu
Silver medal – second place	2004 Yangon	Qiangshu
Southeast Asian Games
Gold medal – first place	2003 Hanoi	Jianshu
Gold medal – first place	2003 Hanoi	Qiangshu
Gold medal – first place	2005 Manila	Changquan
Gold medal – first place	2005 Manila	Qiangshu
Silver medal – second place	2001 Kuala Lumpur	Jianshu
Silver medal – second place	2001 Kuala Lumpur	Qiangshu
Bronze medal – third place	2005 Manila	Qiangshu

Nguyễn Thị Mỹ Đức is a former wushu taolu athlete from Vietnam. She was a triple medalist at the World Wushu Championships, triple medalist at the Asian Wushu Championships (including being the Asian Champion in changquan), and an eight-time medalist at the Southeast Asian Games. She also won the bronze medal in women's changquan at the 2002 Asian Games. She retired in 2007 and became a coach.

She is the sister of former wushu athlete Nguyễn Thị Ngọc Oanh.

== Competitive history ==
Year	Event	CQ	JS	QS	AA
2001	Southeast Asian Games		2nd place, silver medalist(s)	2nd place, silver medalist(s)	
2002	Asian Games	3rd place, bronze medalist(s)			
2003	Southeast Asian Games		1st place, gold medalist(s)	1st place, gold medalist(s)	
2003	World Championships	3rd place, bronze medalist(s)		2nd place, silver medalist(s)	
2004	Asian Championships	1st place, gold medalist(s)	2nd place, silver medalist(s)	2nd place, silver medalist(s)	
2005	Southeast Asian Games	1st place, gold medalist(s)	3rd place, bronze medalist(s)	1st place, gold medalist(s)	
2005	World Championships			2nd place, silver medalist(s)	

== Awards ==
- Labor Order, 3rd class (2004)

== See also ==
- List of Asian Games medalists in wushu
