= 2000 Asian Wushu Championships =

5th edition of the Asian Wushu Championships

- Venue: Hanoi Indoor Games Gymnasium (capacity: 3,094)
- Location: Hanoi, Vietnam
- Start date: October 31, 2000
- End date: November 4, 2000
- Competitors: 180 from 22 nations

The 2000 Asian Wushu Championships was the 5th edition of the Asian Wushu Championships. It was held at the Hanoi Indoor Games Gymnasium in Hanoi, Vietnam from October 31 to November 4, 2000. This competition reintroduced all-around categories but separately for changquan, nanquan, and taijiquan. A compulsory taijiquan event for athletes over 50 years-old was also added.

== Medal table ==
Taolu only

* Host nation (Vietnam)

Rank	Nation	Gold	Silver	Bronze	Total
1	China (CHN)	13	1	0	14
2	Vietnam (VIE)*	7	7	5	19
3	Hong Kong (HKG)	2	3	5	10
4	Singapore (SGP)	2	1	1	4
5	Chinese Taipei (TPE)	1	6	2	9
6	Japan (JPN)	1	2	3	6
7	Malaysia (MAS)	1	1	2	4
8	Macau (MAC)	1	0	1	2
9	Myanmar	0	6	1	7
10	South Korea (KOR)	0	1	8	9
11	Philippines (PHI)	0	0	1	1
Totals (11 entries)		28	28	29	85

== Medalists ==
=== Taolu ===
==== Men's all-around ====
Event	Gold	Silver	Bronze
Changquan; Three events	Sun Chunhe; China	Oh Poh Soon; Malaysia	Park Chan-dae; South Korea
Nanquan; Three events	Trần Trọng Tuấn; Vietnam	Liu Chun-wei; Chinese Taipei	Kim Yong-tea; South Korea
Taijiquan; Two events	Chan Ming-shu; Chinese Taipei	Toshiya Watanabe; Japan	Nguyễn Anh Minh; Vietnam

==== Men's events ====
Event	Gold	Silver	Bronze
Changquan	Sun Chunhe; China	Leo Wen Yeow; Singapore	Park Chan-dae; South Korea
Daoshu	Sun Chunhe; China	Park Chan-dae; South Korea	Tống Hoàng Lân; Vietnam
Gunshu	Sun Chunhe; China	Trương Quốc Chí; Vietnam	Michael Co; Philippines
Jianshu	Oh Poh Soon; Malaysia	Pyi Wai Phyo; Myanmar	Chow Ting Yu; Hong Kong
Qiangshu	Ding Wei; China	Chow Ting Yu; Hong Kong	Oh Poh Soon; Malaysia
Nanquan	Trần Trọng Tuấn; Vietnam	Hayaoka Shinsuke; Japan	Kim Yong-tea; South Korea
Nandao	Trần Trọng Tuấn; Vietnam	Cheng Ka Ho; Hong Kong	Kim Yong-tea; South Korea
Nangun	Chen Shuai; China	Liu Chun-wei; Chinese Taipei	Kim Yong-tea; South Korea
Taijiquan	Zou Yunjian; China	Chan Ming-shu; Chinese Taipei	Toshiya Watanabe; Japan
24-form Taijiquan; 50+ years old	Puan Jooi Eong; Singapore	Hsiao Yung; Chinese Taipei	Yamada Shoji; Japan
Taijijian	Toshiya Watanabe; Japan	Chan Ming-shu; Chinese Taipei	Yang Seong-chan; South Korea; Lee Jae-hyung; South Korea

==== Women's all-around ====
Event	Gold	Silver	Bronze
Changquan; Three events	Wang Xiaona; China	Nguyễn Thúy Hiền; Vietnam	Đàm Thanh Xuân; Vietnam
Nanquan; Three events	Nguyễn Phương Lan; Vietnam	Angie Tsang; Hong Kong	Swe Swe Thant; Myanmar
Taijiquan; Two events	Li Fai; Hong Kong	Khaing Khaing Maw; Myanmar	Wu I-chi; Chinese Taipei

==== Women's events ====
Event	Gold	Silver	Bronze
Changquan	Wang Xiaona; China	Nguyễn Thúy Hiền; Vietnam	Đàm Thanh Xuân; Vietnam
Daoshu	Nguyễn Thúy Hiền; Vietnam	Wang Xiaona; China	Đàm Thanh Xuân; Vietnam
Gunshu	Wang Xiaona; China	Đàm Thanh Xuân; Vietnam	Hiew Siaw Fang; Malaysia
Jianshu	Chong Sao Lan; Macau	Kuo Tzu-ling; Chinese Taipei	Kaya Yamagishi; Japan
Qiangshu	Zhao Yangyang; China	Nguyễn Thúy Hiền; Vietnam	Chong Sao Lan; Macau
Nanquan	Huang Chunni; China	Nguyễn Phương Lan; Vietnam	Angie Tsang; Hong Kong
Nandao	Nguyễn Phương Lan; Vietnam	Swe Swe Thant; Myanmar	Angie Tsang; Hong Kong
Nangun	Nguyễn Phương Lan; Vietnam	Swe Swe Thant; Myanmar	Angie Tsang; Hong Kong
Taijiquan	Li Fai; Hong Kong	Khaing Khaing Maw; Myanmar	Liew Yin Yin; Singapore
24-form Taijiquan; 50+ years old	Tan Soh Hoon; Singapore	Nguyen Thi Hao; Vietnam	Wong Lin Ying; Hong Kong
Taijijian	Liang Xiaokui; China	Khaing Khaing Maw; Myanmar	Wu I-chi; Chinese Taipei
