= Cheng Ka Ho =

Hong Kong wushu practitioner

Cheng Ka Ho MH JP
Personal information
- Born: 1979 (age 46–47) Zhongshan, Guangdong, China
- Education: City University of Hong Kong (MBA); Chinese Academy of Social Sciences; Beijing Sports University

Sport
- Sport: Wushu
- Event(s): Nanquan. Nandao, Nangun
- Team: Hong Kong Wushu Team (1994-2005)
Medal record
Representing Hong Kong
Men's Wushu Taolu
World Championships
| Gold medal – first place | 1999 Hong Kong | Nangun |
| Gold medal – first place | 2003 Macau | Nanquan |
| Gold medal – first place | 2005 Hanoi | Nangun |
| Silver medal – second place | 2001 Yerevan | Nanquan |
| Silver medal – second place | 2001 Yerevan | Nandao |
| Silver medal – second place | 2001 Yerevan | Nangun |
| Silver medal – second place | 2003 Macau | Nangun |
| Bronze medal – third place | 1999 Hong Kong | Nanquan |
Asian Games
| Bronze medal – third place | 2002 Busan | Nanquan |
Asian Championships
| Silver medal – second place | 2000 Hanoi | Nandao |
| Bronze medal – third place | 2004 Yangon | Nandao |

Cheng Ka Ho MH JP (Chinese: 鄭家豪; pinyin: Zhèngjiāháo) is a retired professional wushu taolu athlete and a former captain of the Hong Kong Wushu Team.

== Career ==
=== Wushu career ===
Cheng started practicing wushu at the age of four under his parents and joined the Hong Kong Wushu Team in 1994. He later made his international debut at the 1999 World Wushu Championships and became the first world champion in nangun in addition to winning a bronze medal in nanquan. He was then a triple silver medalist two years later at the 2001 World Wushu Championships. A year later, Cheng won the bronze medal in men's nanquan at the 2002 Asian Games. He then was the world champion in nanquan and won a silver medal in nangun at the 2003 World Wushu Championships. Cheng's last competition was at the 2005 World Wushu Championships where he was the world champion in nangun once again.

=== Business career ===
After his competitive wushu career, Cheng pursued various degrees including a Master of Business Administration at the City University of Hong Kong. He was first hired as a community service director in Hopewell Holdings but now works as a Business Development General Manager with Lee Kee Group.

== Honours ==
- Hong Kong Sports Stars Awards
  - Commendation for Community Service (2007)

== See also ==
- List of Asian Games medalists in wushu
