= Oh Poh Soon =

Malaysian wushu practitioner

Personal information
- Born: 1975 (age 50–51) Malaysia

Sport
- Sport: Wushu
- Events: Changquan Jianshu, Qiangshu
- Team: Malaysia Wushu Team
- Coached by: Chin Hoong Iap
Medal record
Representing Malaysia
Men's Wushu Taolu
World Championships
| Silver medal – second place | 2003 Macau | Qiangshu |
Asian Games
| Silver medal – second place | 1998 Bangkok | CQ All-around |
Asian Championships
| Gold medal – first place | 2000 Hanoi | Jianshu |
| Silver medal – second place | 2000 Hanoi | Qiangshu |
| Silver medal – second place | 2000 Hanoi | CQ All-around |
SEA Games
| Gold medal – first place | 2001 Penang | Changquan |
| Gold medal – first place | 2001 Penang | Jianshu |
| Gold medal – first place | 2001 Penang | Qiangshu |
| Silver medal – second place | 1997 Jakarta | Changquan |
| Bronze medal – third place | 2003 Hanoi | Changquan |
| Bronze medal – third place | 2003 Hanoi | Jianshu |

Oh Poh Soon is a retired competitive wushu taolu athlete from Malaysia. He is a medalist at the World Wushu Championships, Asian Wushu Championships, SEA Games, and the first silver medalist in wushu for Malaysia at the Asian Games.

== Career ==
Oh's first medal in international competition was at the 1997 SEA Games where he won a silver medal in changquan. The following year at the 1998 Asian Games, Oh won a tied silver medal in men's changquan all-around with the Philippines' Mark Robert Rosales. For this, Oh was nominated for the Anugerah Sukan Negara (National Sports Awards). At the 2000 Asian Wushu Championships in Hanoi, he became the Asian champion in jianshu and won a silver medal in qiangshu, thus earning the silver medal in the three event changquan all-around. The following year, Oh was a triple gold medalist at the 2001 SEA Games in Penang. Oh competed a year later at the Asian Games in men's changquan but did not place. Another year later at the 2003 World Wushu Championships in Macau, Oh won the silver medal in qiangshu. His last competition was shortly after at the 2003 SEA Games where he won bronze medals in changquan and jianshu. He retired from competitive wushu and became a coach, eventually opening the Oh Poh Soon Wushu Centre.

== See also ==
- List of Asian Games medalists in wushu
