= Khaing Khaing Maw =

Myanmar wushu practitioner

Personal information
- Born: February 5, 1979 (age 47) Hinthada, Burma

Sport
- Sport: Wushu
- Event(s): Taijiquan, Taijijian
- Team: Myanmar Wushu Team
Medal record
Representing Myanmar
Women's Wushu Taolu
World Championships
Gold medal – first place	2003 Macau	Taijijian
Silver medal – second place	2001 Yerevan	Taijiquan
Silver medal – second place	2003 Macau	Taijiquan
Asian Games
Gold medal – first place	2002 Busan	Taijiquan
Asian Championships
Gold medal – first place	2004 Yangon	Taijiquan
Silver medal – second place	2000 Hanoi	TJQ All-around
Silver medal – second place	2000 Hanoi	Taijiquan
Silver medal – second place	2000 Hanoi	Taijijian
Bronze medal – third place	2004 Yangon	Taijijian
SEA Games
Gold medal – first place	2001 Penang	Taijiquan+Taijijian
Gold medal – first place	2003 Hanoi	Taijiquan
Gold medal – first place	2003 Hanoi	Taijijian
Silver medal – second place	1997 Jakarta	Taijiquan

Khaing Khaing Maw (born February 5, 1979) is a former wushu athlete from Myanmar. She is a one-time world champion and a double silver medalist at the World Wushu Championships. She also won the gold medal in women's taijiquan at the 2001 Southeast Asian Games. At the 2002 Asian Games, she won the gold medal in women's taijiquan, Myanmar's first medal in wushu at the Asian Games. Her last competition was at the 2004 Asian Wushu Championships where she won a gold medal in taijiquan and a bronze medal in taijijian.

== See also ==
- List of Asian Games medalists in wushu
