= Dennis To =

Hong Kong martial artist (born 1981)

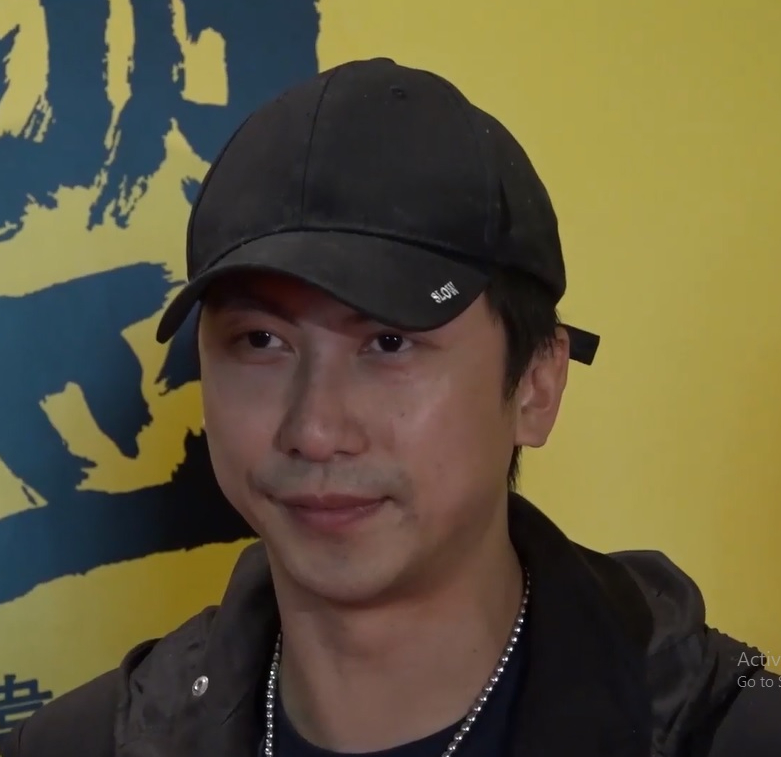
- To in 2018
- Born: 1 January 1981 (age 45); Hong Kong
- Occupations: Actor; martial artist
- Years active: 2007–present

Chinese name
- Traditional Chinese: 杜宇航
Transcriptions
Standard Mandarin
- Hanyu Pinyin: Dù Yǔháng
Yue: Cantonese
- Jyutping: Dou6 Jyu5-hong4
- Musical career
- Also known as: To Yu-hang, To Yu Hang

Medal record

Men's Wushu Taolu

Representing Hong Kong

World Championships
Gold medal – first place	1999 Hong Kong	Changquan
Silver medal – second place	2001 Yerevan	Changquan (new)
Silver medal – second place	2001 Yerevan	Daoshu (new)
Silver medal – second place	2003 Macau	Daoshu
Silver medal – second place	2003 Macau	Duilian
Bronze medal – third place	2001 Yerevan	Gunshu (new)
Bronze medal – third place	2003 Macau	Changquan

Asian Games
Silver medal – second place	2002 Busan	CQ All-Around

Asian Championships
Silver medal – second place	2004 Yangon	Gunshu

East Asian Games
Gold medal – first place	2005 Macau	Changquan

Dennis To Yu-hang (born 1 January 1981) is a Hong Kong martial artist and actor. He started his career as a wushu practitioner and won several awards at various competitions, including a silver medal at the 2002 Asian Games and a gold medal at the 2005 East Asian Games. He became an actor in 2007 and started by playing minor roles in Ip Man (2008), Bodyguards and Assassins (2009) and Ip Man 2 (2010). He is best known for his role as the Wing Chun grandmaster Ip Man in the 2010 film The Legend Is Born – Ip Man.

== Career ==
To started practising wushu at the age of six in the Hong Kong Wushu Union's classes. He attended Helen Liang Memorial Secondary School in Sha Tin, Hong Kong. After graduating from school, To joined the Hong Kong Wushu Team and started participating in wushu competitions. In 1999, at the age of 18, To won a gold medal in Changquan at the 1999 World Wushu Championships, becoming the youngest wushu champion in Hong Kong. He also won various medals at the 2001 and 2003 World Wushu Championships. In 2002, he won a silver medal in Changquan at the 2002 Asian Games. In 2005, To, together with Chan Siu-kit and Chow Ting-yu, won a gold medal in duilian at the East Asian Games.

To took part in the Hong Kong leg of the 2008 Summer Olympics torch relay as one of the 120 torchbearers in Hong Kong.

To joined the entertainment industry in 2007. He is an artiste under National Arts Holdings Limited. To made his debut in a minor role in the 2008 film Ip Man, directed by Wilson Yip and starring Donnie Yen, and he also appeared in the sequel Ip Man 2 (2010). Later, in 2010, he was cast as the lead character, Wing Chun grandmaster Ip Man, in the 2010 film The Legend Is Born – Ip Man.

== Filmography ==
Year	Title	Role	Notes
2008	Ip Man 葉問	Hu Wei	
2009	Bodyguards and Assassins 十月圍城	Nie Zhongqing	
2010	Ip Man 2 葉問2	Cheng Wai-kei	
2010	The Legend Is Born – Ip Man 葉問前傳	Ip Man	
2011	Choy Lee Fut 蔡李佛		guest star
2011	The Harbor, 2012 港都2012		
2011	The Woman Knight of Mirror Lake 競雄女俠·秋瑾	Xu Xilin	
2011	1911 辛亥革命	Xiong Bingkun	
2011	Summer Love 戀夏戀夏戀戀下	Ryan's brother	
2012	Wu Dang 大武當之天地密碼	Taoist Bailong	
2012	Zombie 108 棄城Z-108	SWAT cop	guest star
2019	Ip Man: Kung Fu Master 叶问宗师	Ip Man	
2018	Kung Fu League (Chinese: 功夫联盟)	Ip Man; later revealed to be an imposter, Ip Bit Man	
2019	The Grandmaster of Kung Fu	Huo Yuanjia	
2019	A Lifetime Treasure		

== Awards and nominations ==
=== Wushu ===
Year	Award	Competition	Notes/Ref.
1999	Gold medal	Men's Changquan, 1999 World Wushu Championships	
2001	Silver medal	Changquan, 2001 World Wushu Championships	
2001	Silver medal	Daoshu, 2001 World Wushu Championships	
2001	Bronze medal	Gunshu, 2001 World Wushu Championships	
2002	Silver medal	Changquan, 2002 Asian Games	
2003	Bronze medal	Changquan, 2003 World Wushu Championships	
2003	Silver medal	Daoshu, World Wushu Championships	
2003	Silver medal	Duilian, World Wushu Championships	
2004	Silver medal	Gunshu, Asian Wushu Championships	
2004	Silver medal	Duilian, Asian Wushu Championships	
2005	Gold medal	Duilian, 2005 East Asian Games	Won together with Chan Siu-kit and Chow Ting-yu

=== Film ===
Year	Award / nomination	Film	Event	Notes
2011	Best New Performer nomination	Ip Man 2	30th Hong Kong Film Awards	
2011	Best New Performer nomination	The Legend Is Born – Ip Man	30th Hong Kong Film Awards	
2011	Gold Award for New Performer of the Year			Awarded by the Hong Kong Film Directors' Guild
