= Traditional Wushu Federation of Armenia =

Sporting Organization

Traditional Wushu Federation of Armenia logo

The Traditional Wushu Federation of Armenia (Armenian: Հայաստանի ավանդական ուշուի ֆեդերացիա), is the regulating body of wushu in Armenia, governed by the Armenian Olympic Committee. The headquarters of the federation is located in Yerevan.

== History ==
As a sport, Wushu has been developed in Armenia since the early 1970's. The Traditional Wushu Federation was established in 1992. Rustam Alaverdyan is the current president. The Federation oversees the training of wushu specialists and organizes Armenia's participation in European and international level Wushu competitions, including the European Wushu Championships and the World Junior Wushu Championships. The Federation is a member of the International Wushu Federation and the European Wushu Federation.

== Activities ==
In 2001, the 6th annual World Wushu Championships were held in Yerevan, Armenia.

The Federation organizes various Wushu tournaments throughout the country.

== See also ==
- Sport in Armenia
