= Bao Xian Fei =

Chinese wushu practitioner

Fei Bao Xian
Personal information
- Born: October 4, 1983 (age 42) Nanjing, Jiangsu, China
- Occupation(s): Martial artist, athlete, actor

Sport
- Sport: Wushu
- Event(s): Changquan, Daoshu, Gunshu
Medal record
Men's Wushu Taolu
Representing Netherlands
World Championships
Gold medal – first place	2001 Yerevan	Daoshu (old)
Gold medal – first place	2003 Macau	Gunshu
Gold medal – first place	2005 Hanoi	Daoshu
Silver medal – second place	1999 Hong Kong	Gunshu
Silver medal – second place	2001 Yerevan	Changquan (old)
Silver medal – second place	2001 Yerevan	Gunshu (new)
Bronze medal – third place	1997 Rome	Changquan
Bronze medal – third place	1999 Hong Kong	Daoshu
European Championships
Gold medal – first place	1998 Athens	Changquan
Gold medal – first place	1998 Athens	Daoshu
Gold medal – first place	1998 Athens	Gunshu
Gold medal – first place	2000 Rotterdam	Changquan
Gold medal – first place	2000 Rotterdam	Daoshu
Gold medal – first place	2000 Rotterdam	Gunshu
Gold medal – first place	2002 Póvoa de Varzim	Changquan
Gold medal – first place	2002 Póvoa de Varzim	Daoshu
Gold medal – first place	2002 Póvoa de Varzim	Gunshu

Bao Xian Fei (born October 4, 1983 in Nanjing, China) is a former wushu taolu athlete and actor from the Netherlands. He is a three-time world champion.

== Biography ==
At the age of 5, Fei started to train with his father, Grandmaster Yuliang Fei, in different wushu styles, including Shaolin and modern forms. His father originally had a successful junior wushu career in China and decided to move to move to the netherlands to spread wushu internationally. At the age of 14, his first major international debut was at the 1997 World Wushu Championships in Rome, Italy, where he won a bronze medal in changquan. Between then and 2005, he won seven more medals at the world championships and was a three-time world champion. He was also a nine-time European champion between 1998 and 2002.

His first film role was a security guard in the 2003 American television production "Second Nature", Alec Baldwin played the lead. In 2004, he played a more important role as "Wong" in "Fighting Fish", the first martial arts production in the Netherlands.

== Filmography ==
- Second Nature, USA (TV) 2003
- Fighting Fish, NL 2004
