= 2008 Beijing Wushu Tournament – Men's nanquan =

Men's nanquan at the 2008 Beijing Wushu Tournament
- Venue: Olympic Sports Center Gymnasium
- Dates: 21-22 August
- Competitors: 11 from 11 nations

Medalists
| gold medal | Willy Wang | Philippines |
| silver medal | Peng Wei-Chua | Chinese Taipei |
| bronze medal | Pui Fook Chien | Malaysia |

The men's nanquan / nangun all-around competition at the 2008 Beijing Wushu Tournament was held from August 21 to 22 at the Olympic Sports Center Gymnasium.

== Background ==
The nanquan, nandao, and nangun events at the 2007 World Wushu Championships were tightly contested. In comparison to other events, none of the nanquan athletes were a multi-medalist at the world championships, but Willy Wang and Pui Fook Chien emerged as potential favorites for the Beijing Wushu Tournament since they were one of the few athletes to place in the top eight across the three standard nanquan events.

At the tournament, the nanquan event was closely contested with the top five scoring within a range of 0.5 points. In the nangun event, Willy Wang and Pui Fook Chien secured their positions, earning the gold and bronze medal respectively. Peng Wei-Chua made a comeback from fifth place during the first round to winning the silver medal. Willy Wang's victory was hailed by the Philippines media, as the team did not receive any medals at the 2008 Summer Olympics.

== Schedule ==
All times are Beijing Time (UTC+08:00)

| Date | Time | Event |
|---|---|---|
| Thursday, 21 August 2008 | 10:29 | Nanquan |
| Friday, 22 August 2008 | 19:30 | Nangun |

== Results ==
The nanquan event was judged with the degree of difficulty component while the nangun was judged without it.

| Rank | Athlete | Nanquan | Nangun | Total |
|---|---|---|---|---|
| 1st place, gold medalist(s) | Willy Wang (PHI) | 9.74 | 9.70 | 19.44 |
| 2nd place, silver medalist(s) | Peng Wei-Chua (TPE) | 9.70 | 9.69 | 19.39 |
| 3rd place, bronze medalist(s) | Pui Fook Chien (MAS) | 9.72 | 9.62 | 19.34 |
| 4 | Koki Nakata (JPN) | 9.72 | 9.50 | 19.22 |
| 5 | Farshad Arabi (IRI) | 9.71 | 9.44 | 19.15 |
| 6 | Stanislav Galkin (RUS) | 9.35 | 9.48 | 18.83 |
| 7 | Michele Giordano (ITA) | 8.99 | 9.37 | 18.36 |
| 8 | Hani El-Sayed (EGY) | 8.65 | 9.20 | 17.85 |
| 9 | Adriano Lourenço da Silva (BRA) | 8.31 | 9.40 | 17.71 |
| 10 | Prabhath Mudiyanselage (SRI) | 8.47 | 8.85 | 17.32 |
| 11 | Maximiliano Rodríguez (ARG) | 7.94 | 9.12 | 17.06 |
