= Nguyễn Phương Lan =

Vietnamese wushu practitioner

Personal information
- Born: 1971 (age 54–55) Hanoi, Vietnam

Sport
- Sport: Wushu
- Event: Nanquan
- Team: Vietnam Wushu Team
Medal record
Representing Vietnam
Women's Wushu Taolu
World Championships
Gold medal – first place	1999 Hong Kong	Nangun
Silver medal – second place	1995 Baltimore	Nanquan
Silver medal – second place	1997 Rome	Jianshu
Silver medal – second place	1999 Hong Kong	Nandao
Silver medal – second place	2001 Yerevan	Nanquan
Silver medal – second place	2001 Yerevan	Nangun
Bronze medal – third place	1995 Baltimore	Daoshu
Bronze medal – third place	1997 Rome	Nanquan
Bronze medal – third place	1997 Rome	Qiangshu
Bronze medal – third place	1999 Hong Kong	Nanquan
Bronze medal – third place	2001 Yerevan	Nandao
Asian Championships
Gold medal – first place	2000 Hanoi	All-around (NQ)
Gold medal – first place	2000 Hanoi	Nandao
Gold medal – first place	2000 Hanoi	Nangun
Silver medal – second place	2000 Hanoi	Nanquan
Southeast Asian Games
Gold medal – first place	1997 Kuala Lumpur	Nanquan
Gold medal – first place	2001 Kuala Lumpur	Nandao+Nangun
Gold medal – first place	2003 Hanoi	Nangun
Silver medal – second place	1997 Jakarta	Qiangshu
Bronze medal – third place	1993 Singapore	Jianshu
Bronze medal – third place	2001 Kuala Lumpur	Nanquan
Bronze medal – third place	2003 Hanoi	Nanquan

Nguyễn Phương Lan is a former wushu taolu athlete from Vietnam. She was among the first generation of renowned athletes from Vietnam, having achieved numerous victories in domestic competitions.

== Career ==
Nguyễn was a competitive swimmer in her youth, and later started practicing shaolinquan for a year in 1991. The following year, she was selected by the Hanoi Department of Physical Education to join the first wushu class in Vietnam despite being married and a factory worker.

=== Competitive career ===
Nguyễn made her international debut at the 1993 Southeast Asian Games where she won a bronze medal in jianshu. Two years later, she competed in the 1995 World Wushu Championships and won a silver medal in jianshu and a bronze medal in daoshu. Wushu was later re-introduced in the 1997 Southeast Asian Games and Nguyễn won the gold medal in nanquan and a silver medal in qiangshu. Shortly after, she was a triple medalist at the 1997 World Wushu Championships, winning a silver medal in jianshu and bronze medals in nanquan and qiangshu. Two years later, she was the first world champion in nangun and won a silver medal in nandao and bronze medal in nanquan at the 1999 World Wushu Championships. At the 2000 Asian Wushu Championships, she won gold medals in nandao and nangun and a silver medal in nanquan and won the all-around championship for female nanquan. At the 2001 Southeast Asian Games, Nguyễn won a gold medal in nandao and nangun combined and a bronze medal in nanquan. Her last competition was the 2001 World Wushu Championships, where she won silver medals in nanquan and nangun and a bronze medal in nandao.

=== Coaching career ===
In 2003, Nguyễn became the coach of the Vietnam National Youth Wushu Team. In 2007, she became the national team coach.

== Awards ==
- Labor Order, 2nd class (2001)
