= Vyacheslav Shapovalov =

Ukrainian government official

- В'ячеслав Шаповалов

Deputy Minister of Defense of Ukraine
- In office 17 November 2021 – 24 January 2023

Personal details
- Born: 20 June 1969 (age 56) Kharkiv, Ukrainian SSR, Soviet Union

Vyacheslav Shapovalov (born 20 June 1969) is a Ukrainian government official. He was the deputy defense minister of Ukraine (2021–2023).

== Early life ==
Shapovalov was born on 20 June 1969 within the city of Kharkiv, which was then part of the Ukrainian SSR in the Soviet Union. After graduating secondary school, he served in the Soviet Armed Forces, before working as an airfield worker for the Kharkiv Aviation Unit of the Ukrainian Civil Aviation Administration and later as a flight attendant stationed in Minsk National Airport. In 1993, he graduated from the National Aviation University in Kyiv with a specialization in organization of transportation and management. Afterwords, he worked in private-sector transport. He was first a specialist in international transportation for PAN Ukraine until 1996, and then later until 1998 a passenger service organization agent for the state aviation company Airlines of Ukraine.

In 1998, he was briefly a specialist in international transportation for VALTA, before working as a sales manager for ChelProm LLC in Kyiv until 2002. He was then, until 2009, general director of the Universal Repair Mechanical Plant "Zubr" in Bucha.

== Civil and political career ==
In 2010, he was appointed Head of the Construction Department within the Ministry of Housing and Communal Services. He did this until late 2012, before in 2013 becoming Deputy General Director for Construction of the state enterprise "Spetsservice" until he was again transferred in 2014 to beecome Head of the Capital Construction and Housing Department of the State Affairs Administration. From 2014 to 2015 he was Director of the Capital Construction Department within Kyiv Oblast, from 2015 to 2017 advisor to the deputy head of Kyiv Oblast, and then from 2018 to 2019 Director of the Property Policy Department for Ukrainian Railways.

In 2020 he was appointed Director of the Directorate of Infanstructure for the Ministry of Reintegration of Temporarily Occupied Territories, which he did until 2021. In 2021 he was appointed Deputy Minister of Defense of Ukraine, where he oversaw logistics and rear support for the Ukrainian Armed Forces. However, he soon became involved in a number of scandals including providing low-quality bulletproof vests and winter uniforms and also for overpricing food contracts. In February 2023, the SBU issued formal suspicions for Shapovalov and procurement director Bohdan Khmelnytsky under Article 191(5) and Article 114-1, and they were held in pre-trial detention. Subsequently, he resigned from the post later that month in January 2023, although he called the allegations "baseless and unfounded."
