= 1997 World Wushu Championships =

4th edition of the World Wushu Championships

- Venue: Palasport dell'Eur (capacity: 11,200)
- Location: Rome, Italy
- Start date: November 3, 1997
- End date: November 8, 1997
- Competitors: 700 from 55 nations

The 1997 World Wushu Championships was the 4th edition of the World Wushu Championships. It was held at the Palazzo dello Sport in Rome, Italy from November 3 to November 8, 1997. For the countries in Asia, this was the qualification for the 1998 Asian Games.

== Medal table ==
* Host nation (Italy)

Rank	NOC	Gold	Silver	Bronze	Total
1	China	8	2	0	10
2	Hong Kong	3	4	2	9
3	Russia	3	0	1	4
4	Vietnam	2	3	5	10
5	South Korea	2	1	4	7
6	Iran	2	1	1	4
7	Kazakhstan	2	0	1	3
8	Chinese Taipei	1	3	2	6
9	Philippines	1	1	3	5
10	Egypt	1	1	1	3
11	Romania	0	2	1	3
12	Macau	0	2	0	2
13	Japan	0	1	2	3
14	Spain	0	1	1	2
15	Azerbaijan	0	1	0	1
15	Singapore	0	1	0	1
15	Tajikistan	0	1	0	1
18	Italy*	0	0	2	2
18	Portugal	0	0	2	2
20	Algeria	0	0	1	1
20	Brazil	0	0	1	1
20	Great Britain	0	0	1	1
20	India	0	0	1	1
20	Israel	0	0	1	1
20	Malaysia	0	0	1	1
20	Netherlands	0	0	1	1
20	United States	0	0	1	1
Totals (27 entries)		25	25	36	86

== Medalists ==
=== Men's taolu ===
Event	Gold	Silver	Bronze
Changquan	Yuan Wenqing; China	Vincent Ng; Singapore	Fei Bao Xian; Netherlands
Daoshu	Park Chan-dae; South Korea	Ng Wa Loi; Macau	Garry Cua; Philippines
Gunshu	Mark Robert Rosales; Philippines	Park Chan-dae; South Korea	Kweon Heung-seok; South Korea
Jianshu	Wong Chi Kwong; Hong Kong	Cheung Man Keung; Hong Kong	Cheah Kok Luan; Malaysia
Qiangshu	Wu Gang; China	Sae Tem Sa Art; Macau	Dương Duy Kiếm; Vietnam
Nanquan	Lee Chun-hui; Chinese Taipei	Leung Yat Ho; Hong Kong	Kim Young-jea; South Korea
Taijiquan	Chen Sitan; China	Chan Ming-shu; Chinese Taipei	Toshiya Watanabe; Japan

=== Women's taolu ===
Event	Gold	Silver	Bronze
Changquan	Lu Dan; China	Nguyễn Thúy Hiền; Vietnam	Lo Nga Ching; Hong Kong
Daoshu	Zuo Juan; China	Nguyễn Thúy Hiền; Vietnam	Lo Nga Ching; Hong Kong
Gunshu	Chen Jing; China	Lo Nga Ching; Hong Kong	Nguyễn Thanh Loan; Vietnam
Jianshu	Ng Siu Ching; Hong Kong	Nguyễn Phương Lan; Vietnam	Yuri Kaminiwa; Japan
Qiangshu	Nguyễn Thúy Hiền; Vietnam	Ng Siu Ching; Hong Kong	Nguyễn Phương Lan; Vietnam
Nanquan	Ng Siu Ching; Hong Kong	Cho Yu-chiao; Chinese Taipei	Nguyễn Phương Lan; Vietnam
Taijiquan	Boo Eun-kyung; South Korea	Emi Akazawa; Japan	Hsiao Ching-lan; Chinese Taipei

=== Men's sanda ===
Event	Gold	Silver	Bronze
48 kg	Rabiea Gamil; Egypt	Cai Wu-chien; Chinese Taipei	Rami Imanilov; Israel
48 kg	Rabiea Gamil; Egypt	Cai Wu-chien; Chinese Taipei	Nguyễn Y. Vietnam
52 kg	Liu Zedong; China	Rolly Chulhang; Philippines	Woo Seung-soo; South Korea
52 kg	Liu Zedong; China	Rolly Chulhang; Philippines	R. Vankah; India
56 kg	Đào Việt Lập; Vietnam	Li Wei; China	Attila Gömbös; Romania
56 kg	Đào Việt Lập; Vietnam	Li Wei; China	Jeon M. South Korea
60 kg	Dias Zhamash; Kazakhstan	Gheorghe Lupu; Romania	D. Malec; Philippines
60 kg	Dias Zhamash; Kazakhstan	Gheorghe Lupu; Romania	Michele Fantozzi; Italy
65 kg	Aselder Begov; Russia	Ramón Quina; Spain	Mahmoud Zinhem; Egypt
65 kg	Aselder Begov; Russia	Ramón Quina; Spain	Richard Hamilton; Great Britain
70 kg	Yang Jinqiang; China	Janpolad Budagov; Azerbaijan	Khaled Sellaoui; Algeria
70 kg	Yang Jinqiang; China	Janpolad Budagov; Azerbaijan	Jerome Lumabas; Philippines
75 kg	Hossein Ojaghi; Iran	Csaba Gömbös; Romania	M. Wu Fen; Chinese Taipei
75 kg	Hossein Ojaghi; Iran	Csaba Gömbös; Romania	Abdulmutalib Shakhrukhanov; Russia
80 kg	Kasim Gasanov; Russia	Behnam Shahvandi; Iran	Pedro Borges; Portugal
80 kg	Kasim Gasanov; Russia	Behnam Shahvandi; Iran	Cung Le; United States
85 kg	Khizri Mutaev; Russia	Sameh Ibrahim; Egypt	Mohammad Reza Jafari; Iran
85 kg	Khizri Mutaev; Russia	Sameh Ibrahim; Egypt	Pablo Ortega; Spain
90 kg	Vakhit Abubakarov; Kazakhstan	Teng Ju; China	Lino Borges; Portugal
90 kg	Vakhit Abubakarov; Kazakhstan	Teng Ju; China	André Assis; Brazil
+90 kg	Ali Mirmiran; Iran	Aslan Khamzatov; Tajikistan	M. Baidullayev; Kazakhstan
+90 kg	Ali Mirmiran; Iran	Aslan Khamzatov; Tajikistan	Danilo Capuzi; Italy
