= Angie Tsang =

Chinese actress (born 1978)

- Born: Tsang Sze-Man; 1978 (age 47–48); British Hong Kong
- Native name: 曾思敏
- Style: Wushu; Nanquan
- Years active: 1990–2019

Other information
- Occupation: Police officer; martial artist; former child actress
- Spouse: Sidney Chan
- Children: Winsome Chan (daughter); Waylon Chan (son)
- Sports career
- Team: Hong Kong Wushu Team
Medal record
Women's Wushu
World Championships
Gold medal – first place	2005 Hanoi	Nangun
Silver medal – second place	1999 Hong Kong	Nangun
Silver medal – second place	2001 Yerevan	Nandao
Silver medal – second place	2003 Macau	Nandao
Silver medal – second place	2005 Hanoi	Nandao
Bronze medal – third place	1999 Hong Kong	Nandao
Bronze medal – third place	2001 Yerevan	Nanquan
Bronze medal – third place	2001 Yerevan	Nangun
Bronze medal – third place	2003 Macau	Nanquan
Bronze medal – third place	2003 Macau	Duilian
Asian Games
Silver medal – second place	2006 Doha	Nanquan
Asian Championships
Silver medal – second place	2000 Hanoi	Nanquan
Silver medal – second place	2000 Hanoi	All-around (NQ)
Bronze medal – third place	2000 Hanoi	Nandao
Bronze medal – third place	2000 Hanoi	Nangun
East Asian Games
Bronze medal – third place	2001 Osaka	Nanquan
- Police career
- Country: Hong Kong
- Allegiance: Government of the Hong Kong Special Administrative Region
- Department: Hong Kong Police Force
- Service years: 2003–present
- Status: Active

Angela Tsang Sze-Man (born 1978) is a Hong Kong police officer, former wushu athlete and former child actress. She was best known as an Asian Games silver medalist for Wushu in 2006.

== Background ==
Tsang first started by learning lion dances at the age of 10, before moving on to Wushu on the advice of Mr. Ha Tak-kin, her martial arts instructor. In the same year, she won her first gold medal in the Hong Kong Wushu Age Group Competition. She was later selected by the Hong Kong Wushu Union to receive special training which paved the way for her to represent the country in world events.

As a child actress, Tsang portrayed a young Wong Fei-hung in the 1993 Hong Kong martial arts film Iron Monkey. She also made an appearance in the 1996 film Combo Cops.

As a member of Hong Kong's national wushu team, Tsang won a silver medal in the women's nangun (southern staff) event of World Wushu Championships in Hong Kong in 1999. She was a bronze-medal winner in the same event in 2001 in Yerevan.

Tsang joined the Hong Kong Police Force in January 2003.

Tsang eventually won a gold medal in 2005 in Hanoi, Vietnam.

Tsang won a silver medal in the Wushu taolu contest at the 2006 Asian Games in Doha, Qatar.

== Personal life ==
Tsang was married to a fellow policeman Sidney Chan, with whom she had a daughter Winsome in 2008, and later a son Waylon.

In September 2018, Tsang announced her plans to retire from martial arts the following year.

== Filmography ==
=== Films ===
Year	Title	Role	Note
1993	Iron Monkey	Wong Fei-hung	
1996	Combo Cops		
