= Đàm Thanh Xuân =

Vietnamese wushu athlete

Personal information
- Born: 1 November 1985 (age 41) Russian SFSR, Soviet Union

Sport
- Sport: Wushu
- Events: Changquan, Daoshu, Gunshu
- Team: Vietnam Wushu Team (1994-2005)
Medal record
Representing Vietnam
Women's Wushu Taolu
World Championships
Gold medal – first place	1999 Hong Kong	Gunshu
Gold medal – first place	2001 Yerevan	Changquan (new)
Gold medal – first place	2001 Yerevan	Daoshu (old)
Gold medal – first place	2005 Hanoi	Gunshu
Silver medal – second place	2001 Yerevan	Gunshu
Silver medal – second place	2003 Macau	Gunshu
Silver medal – second place	2005 Hanoi	Daoshu
Asian Championships
Gold medal – first place	2004 Yangon	Gunshu
Silver medal – second place	2000 Saigon	Gunshu
Silver medal – second place	2004 Yangon	Daoshu
Bronze medal – third place	2000 Saigon	All-around (CQ)
Bronze medal – third place	2000 Saigon	Changquan
Bronze medal – third place	2000 Saigon	Daoshu
Bronze medal – third place	2004 Yangon	Changquan
SEA Games
Gold medal – first place	2003 Hanoi	Gunshu
Gold medal – first place	2005 Manila	Gunshu
Silver medal – second place	2003 Hanoi	Changquan
Silver medal – second place	2003 Hanoi	Daoshu
Silver medal – second place	2005 Manila	Daoshu
Bronze medal – third place	2005 Manila	Changquan

Đàm Thanh Xuân (born 11 January 1985) is a former wushu taolu athlete from Vietnam. She works at the Department of International Cooperation and General Department of Physical Education and Sports.

== Career ==
Xuân made her international debut at the 1999 World Wushu Championships where she became the world champion in gunshu. A year later, she won a silver and two bronze medals at the 2000 Asian Wushu Championships and thus won the bronze medal in women's changquan all-around. She was a double gold medalist in daoshu and gunshu and a silver medalist in gunshu at the 2001 World Wushu Championships. The following year, she won a gold medal in gunshu and silver medals in changquan and daoshu at the 2003 Southeast Asian Games and a silver medal in gunshu at the 2003 World Wushu Championships. A year later, she won medals of every color at the 2004 Asian Wushu Championships as well as in the 2005 Southeast Asian Games. Her last competition was at the 2005 World Wushu Championships where she became the world champion in gunshu and a silver medalist in daoshu.

== Awards ==
- 3rd class Labor Order.
- National Outstanding Athlete (1999, 2000).

== Personal life ==
Xuân got married with one of her childhood friend. Her husband is also a Wushu athlete - both of them have studied for a master's degree at Shanghai Sports University.
