= Cheung Man Keung =

Hong Kong wushu practitioner

Sport
- Sport: Wushu
- Event: Taijiquan
- Team: Hong Kong Wushu Team
Medal record
Representing Hong Kong
Men's Wushu Taolu
World Championships
Gold medal – first place	1999 Hong Kong	Jianshu
Gold medal – first place	2001 Yerevan	Qiangshu (new)
Silver medal – second place	1999 Hong Kong	Taijiquan
Silver medal – second place	1999 Hong Kong	Qiangshu
Silver medal – second place	2001 Yerevan	Jianshu (new)

Cheng Man Keung is a retired professional wushu taolu athlete from Hong Kong. He is a five-time medalist at the World Wushu Championships and a two-time world champion. In the men's taijiquan event at the 2002 Asian Games, he finished 10th place overall.
