= Nguyễn Thị Ngọc Oanh =

Vietnamese wushu practitioner

Personal information
- Born: 1981 (age 44–45) Hanoi, Vietnam

Sport
- Sport: Wushu
- Event(s): Nanquan, Nandao, Nangun
- Team: Vietnam Wushu Team
Medal record
Representing Vietnam
Women's Wushu Taolu
World Championships
Gold medal – first place	2003 Macau	Nandao
Silver medal – second place	2003 Macau	Nanquan
Silver medal – second place	2005 Hanoi	Nangun
Asian Games
Silver medal – second place	2002 Busan	Nanquan
Asian Championships
Silver medal – second place	2004 Yangon	Nandao
Bronze medal – third place	1996 Manila	Nanquan
Bronze medal – third place	1996 Manila	Daoshu
Southeast Asian Games
Gold medal – first place	2003 Hanoi	Nandao
Silver medal – second place	1993 Singapore	Daoshu
Silver medal – second place	2005 Manila	Nanquan

Nguyễn Thị Ngọc Oanh is a former wushu taolu athlete from Vietnam. She is a three-time medalist at the World Wushu Championships including a one-time world champion, a four-time medalist at the Southeast Asian Games, and a medalist at the Asian Games and the Asian Wushu Championships.

She is the elder sister of former wushu athlete and coach Nguyễn Thị Mỹ Đức.

== Awards ==
- Labor Order, 3rd class (2004)

== See also ==
- List of Asian Games medalists in wushu
