= Kung Fu League =

2018 Chinese film directed by Jeffrey Lau

- Theatrical release poster
- 功夫联盟
- Directed by: Jeffrey Lau
- Written by: Huang Jianhong
- Produced by: Jian Chuanrong
- Starring: Ashin Shu; Vincent Zhao; Andy On; Danny Chan; Dennis To; Madina Memet
- Narrated by: Ashin Shu
- Cinematography: Andy Kwong
- Edited by: Marco Mak; Eric Kwong; Wang Gaigai
- Music by: Roc Chen
- Production companies: Beijing United Entertainment Partners Cultures & Media Co., Ltd.; Jia Huan Pictures; Mengmi Culture; Shanghai JUS Brand Cci Capital Ltd.
- Distributed by: Jia Huan Pictures
- Release dates: 13 October 2018 (Hong Kong); 26 October 2018 (China)
- Running time: 103 minutes
- Country: China
- Languages: Mandarin; Cantonese
- Box office: $2.5 million

Kung Fu League (Chinese: 功夫联盟) is a 2018 Chinese action martial arts fantasy comedy film directed by Jeffrey Lau and written by Huang Jianhong. Featuring the cast included Ashin Shu, Vincent Zhao, Andy On, Danny Chan, Dennis To and Madina Memet, the film tells a story of a struggling comic book artist who called four legendary masters to help him get his love interest.

Kung Fu League was released in China on 26 October 2018 and in Hong Kong on 13 October 2018. It received largely mixed to negative reviews from audience and critics.

== Plot ==
Fei Yingxiong is an indigent comic book artist who romantically interested in Bao'er. However, Fei found out that Zhang Peng, the boss of a technology company, have also fell in love with her, due to Zhang is Bao'er's cousin. To prevent Zhang getting his lover, Fei summons four legendary Kung Fu masters – included Wong Fei-hung, Huo Yuanjia, Chen Zhen and Ip Man – in order to help him learn the martial arts and win her heart.

== Cast ==
Main cast

- Ashin Shu as Fei Yingxiong
- Vincent Zhao as Wong Fei-hung
- Andy On as Huo Yuanjia
- Danny Chan as Chen Zhen
- Dennis To as Ip Man
- Madina Memet as Bao'er

Supporting cast

- He Yunwei as Shi Gandang
- Steven Zhang as Manager Zhang Peng
- Zhang Yao as 13th aunt
- Zhou Zhinuo as Maid Chun Hua
- Zhang Mingming as Brother Tao
- Wu Chenchen as cashier

Special and cameo appearance

- Bruce Leung as Qiao Shanhu
- Leung Kar-yan as Director Zhang
- Kingdom Yuen as Aunt Ying
- Hung Yan-yan as Clubfoot Kai
- Lam Tze-chung as Butcher Wing
- Timmy Hung as Bucktooth Su
- Ken Lo as Villain Kin
- Cheung Wing-fat as A Niu
