= 2003 World Wushu Championships =

7th edition of the World Wushu Championships

- Venue: Indoor Stadium of the Macau Polytechnic Institute
- Location: Macau, China
- Start date: November 2, 2003
- End date: November 7, 2003
- Competitors: 411 from 59 nations

The 2003 World Wushu Championships was the 7th edition of the World Wushu Championships. It was held at the Indoor Stadium of the Macau Polytechnic Institute in Macau, China from November 3 to November 7, 2003. 411 athletes from 59 IWUF national federations participated in this event. This is the first edition where women's sanshou was added.

== Medal table ==
* Host nation (Macau)

Rank	NOC	Gold	Silver	Bronze	Total
1	China	17	1	0	18
2	Vietnam	4	5	3	12
3	Russia	3	6	0	9
4	Hong Kong	2	5	4	11
5	Myanmar	2	4	0	6
6	South Korea	2	3	2	7
7	Philippines	2	2	4	8
8	Macau*	2	0	4	6
9	Japan	1	2	2	5
10	Egypt	1	2	1	4
11	United States	1	1	1	3
12	Iran	1	0	2	3
13	Netherlands	1	0	0	1
14	Malaysia	0	2	3	5
15	Azerbaijan	0	2	0	2
16	Mexico	0	1	1	2
17	Brazil	0	1	0	1
17	Italy	0	1	0	1
17	Poland	0	1	0	1
20	Romania	0	0	4	4
20	Turkey	0	0	4	4
22	Chinese Taipei	0	0	3	3
22	France	0	0	3	3
24	India	0	0	2	2
24	Mongolia	0	0	2	2
24	Singapore	0	0	2	2
24	Sweden	0	0	2	2
24	Yemen	0	0	2	2
29	Canada	0	0	1	1
29	Greece	0	0	1	1
29	Spain	0	0	1	1
Totals (31 entries)		39	39	54	132

== Medalists ==
=== Men's taolu ===
Event	Gold	Silver	Bronze
Changquan	Zhao Qingjian; China	Vladimir Krassiouk; Russia	To Yu-hang; Hong Kong
Daoshu	Arvin Ting; Philippines	To Yu-hang; Hong Kong	Kweon Heung-seok; South Korea
Gunshu	Fei Bao Xian; Netherlands	Vladimir Krassiouk; Russia	Hsiao Yung-sheng; Chinese Taipei
Jianshu	Wei Jian; China	Pyi Wai Phyo; Myanmar	Lim Yew Fai; Malaysia
Qiangshu	Chow Ting Yu; Hong Kong	Oh Poh Soon; Malaysia	Willy Wang; Philippines
Nanquan	Cheng Ka Ho; Hong Kong	Ho Ro Bin; Malaysia	Lee Seung-kuen; South Korea
Nandao	Trần Trọng Tuấn; Vietnam	Chan Siu Kit; Hong Kong	Leong Hong Man; Macau
Nangun	Huang Shaoxiong; China	Cheng Ka Ho; Hong Kong	Ho Ro Bin; Malaysia
Taijiquan	Yi Peng; China	Toshiya Watanabe; Japan	Goh Qiu Bin; Singapore
Taijijian	Toshiya Watanabe; Japan	Jang Young-ho; South Korea	Chang Shih-po; Chinese Taipei
Duilian	China; Zhao Qingjian; Yi Peng; Wei Jian	Hong Kong; To Yu-hang; Chan Siu Kit; Chow Ting Yu	Malaysia; Lim Yew Fai; Ang Eng Chong; Pui Fook Chien

=== Women's taolu ===
Event	Gold	Silver	Bronze
Changquan	Cao Jing; China	Daria Tarasova; Russia	Nguyễn Thị Mỹ Đức; Vietnam
Daoshu	Nguyễn Thúy Hiền; Vietnam	Xu Huihui; Italy	Wong Wun Yee; Hong Kong
Gunshu	Daria Tarasova; Russia	Đàm Thanh Xuân; Vietnam	Ava Choy; Canada
Jianshu	Han Jing; Macau	Ekaterina Stenicheva; Russia	Koh Poh Chin; Singapore
Qiangshu	Zhao Yangyang; China	Nguyễn Thị Mỹ Đức; Vietnam	Chong Sao Lan; Macau
Nanquan	Luo Hao; China	Nguyễn Thị Ngọc Oanh; Vietnam	Angie Tsang; Hong Kong
Nandao	Nguyễn Thị Ngọc Oanh; Vietnam	Angie Tsang; Hong Kong	Sachiko Takeda; Japan
Nangun	Swe Swe Thant; Myanmar	Lily So; Philippines	Ten Yu; Chinese Taipei
Taijiquan	Guo Yina; China	Khaing Khaing Maw; Myanmar	Emi Akazawa; Japan
Taijijian	Khaing Khaing Maw; Myanmar	Emi Akazawa; Japan	Bùi Mai Phương; Vietnam
Duilian	Macau; Han Jing; Chong Sao Lan	Philippines; Lily So; May Lim	Hong Kong; Angie Tsang; Wong Wun Yee

=== Men's sanda ===
Event	Gold	Silver	Bronze
48 kg	Rene Catalan; Philippines	Thein Htike Oo; Myanmar	Chao Chi Meng; Macau
48 kg	Rene Catalan; Philippines	Thein Htike Oo; Myanmar	Mohammed Al-Ashwal; Yemen
52 kg	Li Bijin; China	Woo Seung-soo; South Korea	Naji Al-Ashwal; Yemen
52 kg	Li Bijin; China	Woo Seung-soo; South Korea	Hüseyin Dündar; Turkey
56 kg	Zhang Shuaike; China	Cha Jun-youl; South Korea	Ölziibadrakhyn Saruul-Od; Mongolia
56 kg	Zhang Shuaike; China	Cha Jun-youl; South Korea	Rexel Nganhayna; Philippines
60 kg	Kim Gwee-jong; South Korea	Baharaddin Salimov; Azerbaijan	Frédéric Tocqueville; France
60 kg	Kim Gwee-jong; South Korea	Baharaddin Salimov; Azerbaijan	Joseph Pasiwat; Philippines
65 kg	Jung Sung-hun; South Korea	Tamer Hassan; Egypt	Vang Moua; France
65 kg	Jung Sung-hun; South Korea	Tamer Hassan; Egypt	Anders Persson; Sweden
70 kg	Tai Puqing; China	Murad Akhadov; Russia	Magsarjavyn Batjargal; Mongolia
70 kg	Tai Puqing; China	Murad Akhadov; Russia	Süleyman Şahin; Turkey
75 kg	Dzhanhuat Beletov; Russia	Zheng Yuhao; China	Hossein Ojaghi; Iran
75 kg	Dzhanhuat Beletov; Russia	Zheng Yuhao; China	Gerardo Cerda; Mexico
80 kg	Liu Hailong; China	Mohamed Selit; Egypt	Stéphane Attelly; France
80 kg	Liu Hailong; China	Mohamed Selit; Egypt	Eugen Preda; Romania
85 kg	Mohammad Reza Jafari; Iran	Rasaf Mehdiyev; Azerbaijan	Leontin Bocancea; Romania
85 kg	Mohammad Reza Jafari; Iran	Rasaf Mehdiyev; Azerbaijan	Alfonso Valcárcel; Spain
90 kg	Wael Moursi; Egypt	Pat Barry; United States	Ali Asghar Shabani; Iran
90 kg	Wael Moursi; Egypt	Pat Barry; United States	Cătălin Zmărăndescu; Romania
+90 kg	Bozigit Ataev; Russia	Antón Cano; Mexico	None awarded
+90 kg	Bozigit Ataev; Russia	Antón Cano; Mexico	None awarded

=== Women's sanda ===
Event	Gold	Silver	Bronze
48 kg	Li Yonghong; China	Thin Zar Soe; Myanmar	Jennifer Lagilag; Philippines
48 kg	Li Yonghong; China	Thin Zar Soe; Myanmar	Bùi Thị Như Trang; Vietnam
52 kg	Qin Lizi; China	Nguyễn Thị Hồng Hà; Vietnam	Maria Avramidou; Greece
52 kg	Qin Lizi; China	Nguyễn Thị Hồng Hà; Vietnam	Clara Patrugan; Romania
56 kg	Ngô Thị Hà; Vietnam	Ekaterina Nikolaeva; Russia	Nora Anwar; Egypt
56 kg	Ngô Thị Hà; Vietnam	Ekaterina Nikolaeva; Russia	Hanife Altun; Turkey
60 kg	Huang Zhifang; China	Nguyễn Thùy Ngân; Vietnam	Susan Paschkewitz; United States
60 kg	Huang Zhifang; China	Nguyễn Thùy Ngân; Vietnam	Hanna Sillen; Sweden
65 kg	Wu Chaolai; China	Juliana Justino; Brazil	Sonu Devi; India
65 kg	Wu Chaolai; China	Juliana Justino; Brazil	Kıymet Karpuzoğlu; Turkey
70 kg	Elaina Maxwell; United States	Joanna Skamla; Poland	Megha Bisht; India
70 kg	Elaina Maxwell; United States	Joanna Skamla; Poland	Lam Lai Chan; Macau
