= Nguyễn Thúy Hiền =

Vietnamese wushu athlete (born 1979)

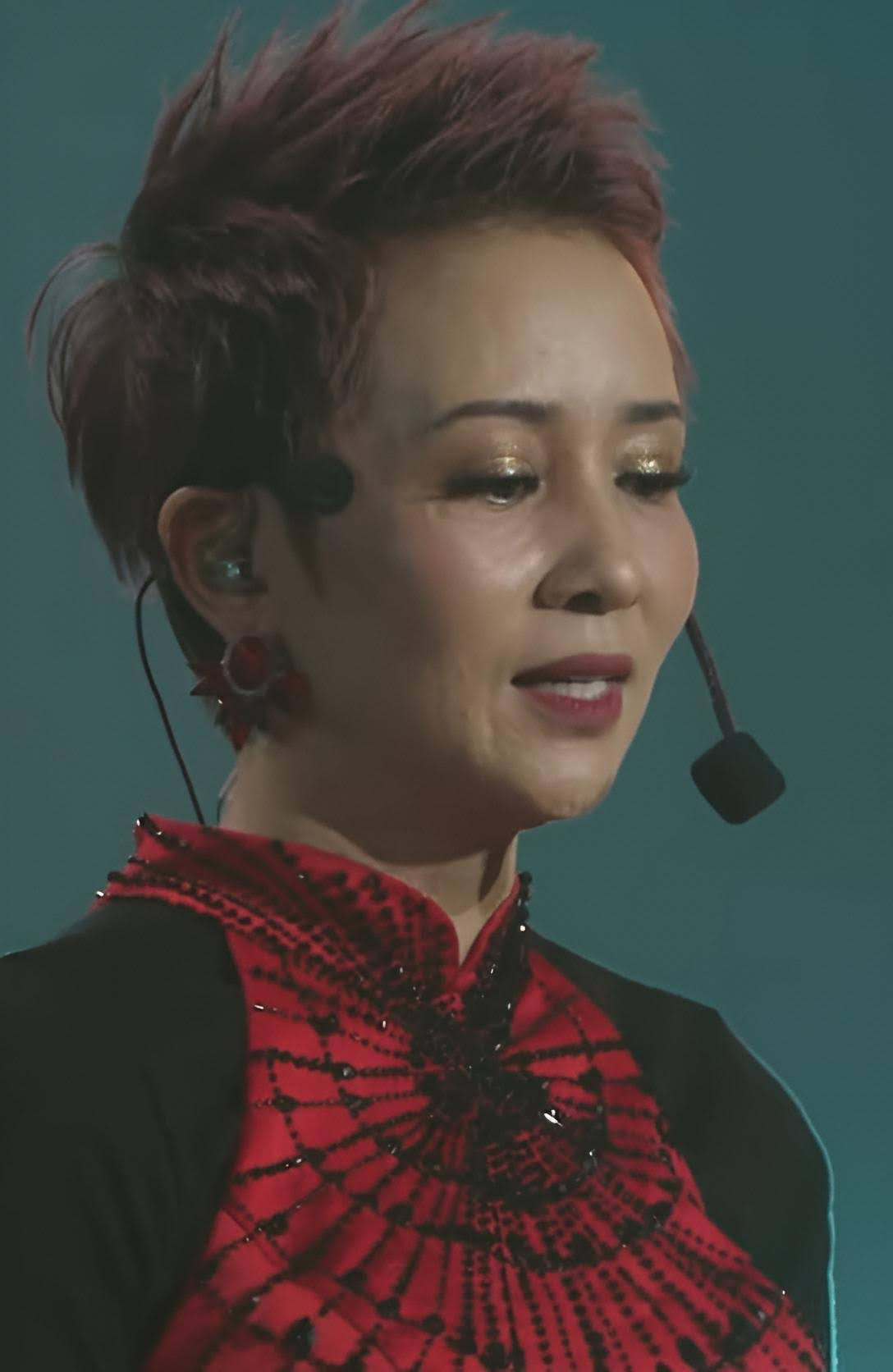
- Nguyễn Thúy Hiền in 2024

Personal information
- Nicknames: 'Nữ hoàng Wushu' ("Queen of Wushu") 'Cô gái vàng' ("Golden Girl")
- Born: 3 November 1979 (age 46) Hanoi, Vietnam

Sport
- Sport: Wushu
- Events: Changquan, Daoshu, Qiangshu
- Team: Vietnam (1993–2005)
- Now coaching: Dương Thúy Vi
Medal record
Representing Vietnam
Women's Wushu
World Championships
Gold medal – first place	1993 Kuala Lumpur	Daoshu
Gold medal – first place	1997 Rome	Qiangshu
Gold medal – first place	1999 Hong Kong	Changquan
Gold medal – first place	2001 Yerevan	Changquan (old)
Gold medal – first place	2001 Yerevan	Daoshu (new)
Gold medal – first place	2001 Yerevan	Qiangshu (old)
Gold medal – first place	2003 Macau	Daoshu
Silver medal – second place	1993 Kuala Lumpur	Changquan
Silver medal – second place	1995 Baltimore	Daoshu
Silver medal – second place	1997 Rome	Changquan
Silver medal – second place	1997 Rome	Daoshu
Silver medal – second place	1999 Hong Kong	Daoshu
Silver medal – second place	1999 Hong Kong	Qiangshu
Bronze medal – third place	1995 Baltimore	Changquan
Bronze medal – third place	1995 Baltimore	Qiangshu
Asian Games
Silver medal – second place	1998 Bangkok	CQ All-Around
Asian Championships
Gold medal – first place	2000 Hanoi	Daoshu
Gold medal – first place	1996 Manila	Daoshu
Silver medal – second place	2000 Hanoi	CQ All-around
Silver medal – second place	1996 Manila	Changquan
Silver medal – second place	2000 Hanoi	Changquan
Silver medal – second place	2000 Hanoi	Qiangshu
SEA Games
Gold medal – first place	1997 Jakarta	Changquan
Gold medal – first place	1997 Jakarta	Daoshu
Gold medal – first place	2001 Kuala Lumpur	Changquan
Gold medal – first place	2001 Kuala Lumpur	Daoshu
Gold medal – first place	2001 Kuala Lumpur	Qiangshu
Gold medal – first place	2003 Hanoi	Changquan
Gold medal – first place	2003 Hanoi	Daoshu
Silver medal – second place	2003 Hanoi	Qiangshu
Southeast Asian Championships
Gold medal – first place	1995 Hanoi	Changquan
Gold medal – first place	1995 Hanoi	Daoshu

Nguyễn Thúy Hiền (born 3 November 1979) is a retired Vietnamese wushu athlete. Considered one of the greatest figures in wushu history and an icon of Vietnamese sports, she won seven world wushu championships.

== Early life ==
Thúy Hiền grew up in the Gia Lâm District of Hanoi. Her father was a player at the football club Song Lam Nghe An FC, and her sister Nguyễn Thuý Vinh became a national player in badminton.

At the age of eleven, she and her sister began practicing shaolinquan in secret from her mother but with support from their father. Due to her success in various competitions, she was selected by Hoàng Vĩnh Giang of the Hanoi Department of Physical Education to enter the first wushu class in Hanoi after just a year of training. She started training with Nguyễn Tùng Lâm, Nguyễn Xuân Thi, and Chinese coaches Trần Húc Hồng and Phan Hán Quang. After further success, she was selected to the national team in 1993 at the age of fourteen.

== Career ==
=== 1993–1997 ===
After joining the Vietnamese Wushu Team, Thúy Hiền's international debut was at the 1993 World Wushu Championships in Kuala Lumpur, Malaysia, where she became the first world champion in wushu for Vietnam by winning the daoshu event. She also won a silver medal in changquan at the competition. Her world title at just fourteen years old set in motion the popularity of wushu across Vietnam, and Thúy Hiền began to become a household name. A year later, she competed in the women's changquan event at the 1994 Asian Games and finished fifth overall. Another year later, she competed at the 1995 World Wushu Championships in Baltimore, USA, and was a triple-medalist, winning a silver medal in daoshu and two bronze medals in changquan and qiangshu.

In early 1996, she was sent to train with the Guangdong wushu team for ten months, then appeared at the 4th Asian Wushu Championships in Manila, Philippines, and won a silver medal in changquan and a bronze medal in daoshu. After her time in China, she competed in the wushu event at the 1997 Southeast Asian Games in Jakarta, Indonesia, and won gold medals in changquan and daoshu. Twenty days later, she competed in the 1997 World Wushu Championships in Rome, Italy, and was a triple medalist again by winning two silver medals in changquan and daoshu and becoming the world champion in qiangshu.

=== 1998–2003 ===
At the 1998 Asian Games in Bangkok, Thailand, Thúy Hiền competed once again in women's changquan and was able to win the silver medal. She was a triple medalist once again at the 1999 World Wushu Championships Hong Kong, this time by being world champion in changquan and winning silver medals in her weapons events. The following year, she returned to the Asian Wushu Championships in Saigon to win a gold medal in daoshu and two silver medals in changquan and qiangshu, but lost the all-around title by 0.01 points.

In the 2001 Southeast Asian Games in Kuala Lumpur, Malaysia, she became a triple gold medalist. Shortly after in the 2001 World Wushu Championships in Yerevan, Armenia, she was again a triple gold medalist. She intended to retire after this competition due to illness, but perhaps due to her numerous successes, she remained a member of the wushu team.

A year later, she competed in the 2002 Asian Games in Busan, South Korea, but only placed fourth in women's changquan. The following year, Thúy Hiền competed in the 2003 World Wushu Championships in Macau where she became the world champion in daoshu. At the 2003 Southeast Asian Games a few weeks later, she was the torch bearer for the opening ceremony. At the wushu competition, she was once again a triple gold medalist in changquan, daoshu, and qiangshu. After sustaining an injury at the competition, Thúy Hiền officially declared her retirement in 2005, becoming a coach and a judge in wushu with a permanent position in the Hanoi Department of Physical Education and Sports.

== Post-retirement and personal life ==
Nguyen married Vietnamese singer Tú Dưa in 2002, whom she met in a concert in 1998. In the 2000s, they opened a clothing store together as a side business to Thúy Hiền's coaching. The couple divorced in 2006 and Thuy Hien won custody of both of their daughters. She married her second husband, Tiến Dũng, on 30 March 2019 after dating for more than a year.

Due to her constant training and injuries in her youth, she suffers from stomach and spinal pain. She has stated that her relationships and pain struggles has left her to feel lonely and depressed at times.

== Competitive history ==
Year	Event	CQ	DS	QS	AA
1993	World Championships	2nd place, silver medalist(s)	1st place, gold medalist(s)		
1994	Asian Games	5	6	4	5
1995	Southeast Asian Championships	1st place, gold medalist(s)	1st place, gold medalist(s)		
1995	World Championships	3rd place, bronze medalist(s)	2nd place, silver medalist(s)	3rd place, bronze medalist(s)	
1996	Asian Championships	2nd place, silver medalist(s)	1st place, gold medalist(s)		
1997	Southeast Asian Games	1st place, gold medalist(s)		1st place, gold medalist(s)	
1997	World Championships	1st place, gold medalist(s)	2nd place, silver medalist(s)	2nd place, silver medalist(s)	
1998	Asian Games	?	?	?	2nd place, silver medalist(s)
1999	World Championships	1st place, gold medalist(s)	2nd place, silver medalist(s)	2nd place, silver medalist(s)	
2000	Asian Championships	2nd place, silver medalist(s)		2nd place, silver medalist(s)	
2001	Southeast Asian Games	1st place, gold medalist(s)	1st place, gold medalist(s)	1st place, gold medalist(s)	
2001	World Championships	1st place, gold medalist(s)	1st place, gold medalist(s)	1st place, gold medalist(s)	
2002	Asian Games	5	6	4	4
2003	World Championships		1st place, gold medalist(s)		
2003	Southeast Asian Games	1st place, gold medalist(s)	1st place, gold medalist(s)	2nd place, silver medalist(s)	

== Awards ==
By the Government of Vietnam:

- Labor Order, 3rd class (1993)
- Labor Order, 2nd class (1997)
- Labor Order, 1st class (2001)
- "Outstanding Athlete" (1993, 1996, 1997, 1998, 1999, 2001)

== Reality TV shows ==
Năm	Chương trình	Vai trò
2024	Chị đẹp đạp gió season 2	Contestant

== See also ==
- List of Asian Games medalists in wushu
- World Wushu Championships § Statistics
