= 2001 World Wushu Championships =

6th edition of the World Wushu Championships

- Venue: Karen Demirchyan Sports and Concerts Complex (capacity: 6,000)
- Location: Yerevan, Armenia
- Start date: October 31, 2001
- End date: November 5, 2001

The 2001 World Wushu Championships was the 6th edition of the World Wushu Championships. It was held at the Karen Demirchyan Sports and Concerts Complex in Yerevan, Armenia from October 31 to November 5, 2001.

== Medal table ==
* Host nation (Armenia)

Rank	Nation	Gold	Silver	Bronze	Total
1	China	12	1	0	13
2	Vietnam	8	6	6	20
3	South Korea	5	1	3	9
4	Hong Kong	4	9	4	17
5	Russia	3	2	5	10
6	Iran	3	1	3	7
7	Myanmar	3	1	2	6
8	Japan	2	4	4	10
9	Brazil	1	2	3	6
10	Netherlands	1	2	1	4
11	Armenia*	1	0	3	4
12	Ukraine	0	2	3	5
13	Egypt	0	2	2	4
14	Belarus	0	2	1	3
14	United States	0	2	1	3
16	Romania	0	1	0	1
16	Uzbekistan	0	1	0	1
18	Lebanon	0	0	3	3
19	Italy	0	0	2	2
19	Poland	0	0	2	2
21	Canada	0	0	1	1
Totals (21 entries)		43	39	49	131

== Medalists ==
=== Men's taolu ===
Event	Gold	Silver	Bronze
Changquan (New)	Jiang Bangjun; China	To Yu-hang; Hong Kong	Vladimir Krassiouk; Russia
Changquan (Old)	Park Chan-dae; South Korea	Fei Bao Xian; Netherlands	Pyi Wai Phyo; Myanmar
Daoshu (New)	Sun Chunhe; China	To Yu-hang; Hong Kong	Fui Yonemoto; Japan
Daoshu (Old)	Fei Bao Xian; Netherlands	Park Chan-dae; South Korea	Andriy Koval; Ukraine
Gunshu (New)	Yuan Xindong; China	Fei Bao Xian; Netherlands	To Yu-hang; Hong Kong
Gunshu (Old)	Park Chan-dae; South Korea	Trương Quốc Chí; Vietnam	Pyi Wai Phyo; Myanmar
Jianshu (New)	Ryoji Sakuma; Japan	Cheung Man Keung; Hong Kong	Ashot Azizyan; Armenia
Jianshu (Old)	Pyi Wai Phyo; Myanmar	Chow Ting Yu; Hong Kong	Javid Didari; Iran
Qiangshu (New)	Cheung Man Keung; Hong Kong	Andrew Nguyen; United States	Lorenzo Paglia; Italy
Qiangshu (Old)	Javid Didari; Iran	Chow Ting Yu; Hong Kong	Yuriy Besarab; Ukraine
Nanquan	Kim Young-jea; South Korea	Cheng Ka Ho; Hong Kong	Lê Quang Huy; Vietnam
Nandao	Trần Trọng Tuấn; Vietnam	Cheng Ka Ho; Hong Kong	Lê Quang Huy; Vietnam
Nangun	Lê Quang Huy; Vietnam	Cheng Ka Ho; Hong Kong	Trần Trọng Tuấn; Vietnam
Taijiquan	Kong Xiangdong; China	Toshiya Watanabe; Japan	Yang Seong-chan; South Korea
Taijijian	Yang Seong-chan; South Korea	Toshiya Watanabe; Japan	Lorenzo Paglia; Italy

=== Women's taolu ===
Event	Gold	Silver	Bronze
Changquan (New)	Ekaterina Stenicheva; Russia	Shared gold	Akiko Kawasaki; Japan
Changquan (New)	Đàm Thanh Xuân; Vietnam	Shared gold	Akiko Kawasaki; Japan
Changquan (Old)	Nguyễn Thúy Hiền; Vietnam	Olena Nizamutdinova; Ukraine	Paula Amidani; Brazil
Daoshu (New)	Nguyễn Thúy Hiền; Vietnam	Akiko Kawasaki; Japan	Cheung Pui Si; Netherlands
Daoshu (Old)	Đàm Thanh Xuân; Vietnam	Olena Nizamutdinova; Ukraine	Irina Antsygina; Russia
Gunshu (New)	Wang Xiaonan; China	Akiko Kawasaki; Japan	Irina Antsygina; Russia
Gunshu (Old)	Lo Nga Ching; Hong Kong	Đàm Thanh Xuân; Vietnam	Olena Nizamutdinova; Ukraine
Jianshu (New)	Liu Qinghua; China	Ekaterina Stenicheva; Russia	Yun Sun-kyung; South Korea
Jianshu (Old)	Lo Nga Ching; Hong Kong	Liliya Kachurina; Uzbekistan	Joelle Bassil; Lebanon
Qiangshu (New)	Ekaterina Stenicheva; Russia	Anita Lopez; United States	Carmen Lau; Canada
Qiangshu (Old)	Nguyễn Thúy Hiền; Vietnam	Juliana Justino; Brazil	None awarded
Nanquan	Ding Huiru; China	Nguyễn Phương Lan; Vietnam	Angie Tsang; Hong Kong
Nandao	Swe Swe Thant; Myanmar	Angie Tsang; Hong Kong	Nguyễn Phương Lan; Vietnam
Nangun	Swe Swe Thant; Myanmar	Nguyễn Phương Lan; Vietnam	Angie Tsang; Hong Kong
Taijiquan	Fan Xueping; China	Khaing Khaing Maw; Myanmar	Emi Akazawa; Japan
Taijijian	Li Fai; Hong Kong	Shared gold	Nguyễn Quỳnh Trang; Vietnam
Taijijian	Emi Akazawa; Japan	Shared gold	Nguyễn Quỳnh Trang; Vietnam

=== Men's sanda ===
Event	Gold	Silver	Bronze
48 kg	Shi Xufei; China	Phan Quốc Vinh; Vietnam	Rabiea Gamil; Egypt
48 kg	Shi Xufei; China	Phan Quốc Vinh; Vietnam	None awarded
52 kg	Kang Yonggang; China	Dragoş Lungu; Romania	Woo Seung-soo; South Korea
52 kg	Kang Yonggang; China	Dragoş Lungu; Romania	Wong Ting Hong; Hong Kong
56 kg	Diệp Bảo Minh; Vietnam	Ibragim Magomedov; Belarus	Uelber Alves Santos; Brazil
56 kg	Diệp Bảo Minh; Vietnam	Ibragim Magomedov; Belarus	Youness Yassine; Lebanon
60 kg	Kim Gwee-jong; South Korea	Timur Magomedov; Russia	Trần Xuân Ánh; Vietnam
60 kg	Kim Gwee-jong; South Korea	Timur Magomedov; Russia	Albert Pope; United States
65 kg	Ge Riletu; China	Phùng Anh Tuấn; Vietnam	Dzhanhuat Beletov; Russia
65 kg	Ge Riletu; China	Phùng Anh Tuấn; Vietnam	Bulat Murgaev; Belarus
70 kg	Kajik Dalyan; Armenia	Li Jie; China	Mansour Norouzi; Iran
70 kg	Kajik Dalyan; Armenia	Li Jie; China	Murad Akhadov; Russia
75 kg	Yuan Yubao; China	Hossein Ojaghi; Iran	Arthur Hakobyan; Armenia
75 kg	Yuan Yubao; China	Hossein Ojaghi; Iran	Emerson Almeida; Brazil
80 kg	Eduardo Fujihira; Brazil	Mohamed Selit; Egypt	Armen Vardanyan; Armenia
80 kg	Eduardo Fujihira; Brazil	Mohamed Selit; Egypt	Shinichiro Hamamatsu; Japan
85 kg	Mohammad Reza Jafari; Iran	André Assis; Brazil	Krzysztof Kęsek; Poland
85 kg	Mohammad Reza Jafari; Iran	André Assis; Brazil	Basel El-Kanany; Egypt
90 kg	Ali Asghar Shabani; Iran	Wael Moursi; Egypt	Yazid Abi Khalil; Lebanon
90 kg	Ali Asghar Shabani; Iran	Wael Moursi; Egypt	None awarded
+90 kg	Bozigit Ataev; Russia	Denis Sobolev; Belarus	Ali Mirmiran; Iran
+90 kg	Bozigit Ataev; Russia	Denis Sobolev; Belarus	Rafat Czerniakowski; Poland

== See also ==
- Traditional Wushu Federation of Armenia
