= China national wushu team =

Wushu team

- Founded: 1990
- Continental union: WFA
- National federation: Chinese Wushu Association

World Games
- Appearances: 3
- Medals: x17 x1 x1

World Championships
- Appearances: 16
- Medals: x 233 x 12 x 2

Junior World Championships
- Appearances: 8
- Medals: x 88 x 12 x 5

Asian Games
- Appearances: 9
- Medals: x 74 x 10 x 4

East Asian Games
- Appearances: 8
- Medals: x 33 x 4 x 4

The China national wushu team represents China in IWUF international competitions. In its entire history, the China national wushu team has never been undefeated on any medal-table in terms of the number of gold medals won. The national wushu team of China is not an official entity or training group since its team members mostly practice with their provincial teams and meet as a national delegation in advance of major international competitions.

== Competition results ==
=== World Wushu Championships ===
The International Wushu Federation does not publish all-time medal tables or medal statistics per each national federation. The IWUF only publishes individual championships results and thus the tables below are compilations of those results.

Red border color indicates host nation status.

Edition	Gold	Silver	Bronze	Total	Gold medals	Total Medals	References
(China) 1991 Beijing	14	1	0	15	1	1	
(Malaysia) 1993 Kuala Lumpur	11	1	0	12	1	1	
(United States) 1995 Baltimore	10	1	0	11	1	1	
(Italy) 1997 Rome	8	2	0	10	1	1	
1999 Hong Kong	11	1	0	12	1	3	
(Armenia) 2001 Yerevan	12	1	0	13	1	3	
2003 Macau	17	1	0	18	1	1	
(Vietnam) 2005 Hanoi	18	1	0	19	1	1	
(China) 2007 Beijing	18	0	0	18	1	1	
(Canada) 2009 Toronto	14	0	1	15	1	1	
(Turkey) 2011 Ankara	19	0	0	19	1	1	
(Malaysia) 2013 Kuala Lumpur	17	1	0	18	1	1	
(Indonesia) 2015 Jakarta	14	1	0	15	1	2	
(Russia) 2017 Kazan	15	0	0	15	1	1	
(China) 2019 Shanghai	14	1	1	16	1	1	
(United States) 2023 Dallas	15	0	0	15	1	1	
(United States) 2025 Brasília	15	1	0	16	1	1	
Total	242	13	2	257	1	1	

=== World Games ===
Edition	Gold	Silver	Bronze	Total	Gold medals	Total Medals	References
(Chinese Taipei) 2009 Kaohsiung	8	0	0	8	1	1	
(Colombia) 2013 Cali	5	1	1	7	1	1	
(United States) 2022 Birmingham	4	0	0	4	1	1	
(China) 2025 Chengdu	5	1	0	6	1	1	
Total	22	2	1	25	1	1	

=== Taolu World Cup ===
Edition	Gold	Silver	Bronze	Total	Gold medals	Total Medals	References
(China) 2016 Fuzhou	7	0	0	7	1	4	
(Myanmar) 2018 Yangon	6	0	0	6	1	4	
(Japan) 2024 Yokohama	8	0	0	8	1	2	
Total	21	0	0	21	1	3	

=== Asian Games ===
Games	Gold	Silver	Bronze	Total	Gold medals	Total Medals
(China) 1990 Beijing	6	5	0	11	1	1
(Japan) 1994 Hiroshima	5	0	0	5	1	1
(Thailand) 1998 Bangkok	9	1	0	10	1	1
(South Korea) 2002 Busan	5	1	2	8	1	1
(Qatar) 2006 Doha	9	0	0	9	1	1
(China) 2010 Guangdong	9	0	1	10	1	1
(South Korea) 2014 Incheon	10	1	1	12	1	1
(Indonesia) 2018 Jakarta-Palembang	10	2	0	12	1	1
(China) 2022 Hangzhou	11	0	0	11	1	1
Total	74	10	4	88	1	1

=== Asian Wushu Championships ===
Edition	Gold	Silver	Bronze	Total	Gold medals	Total Medals
(Japan) 1987 Yokohama	13	3	0	16	1	1
1989 Hong Kong	14	1	0	15	1	1
(South Korea) 1992 Seoul	>7	?	?	>7	1	1
(Philippines) 1996 Manila	>11	?	?	>11	1	1
(Vietnam) 2000 Hanoi	13	1	0	14	1	2
(Myanmar) 2004 Yangon	9	2	0	11	1	2
2008 Macau	13	0	0	13	1	2
(Vietnam) 2012 Ho Chi Minh City	9	0	0	9	1	3
(Chinese Taipei) 2016 Taoyuan City	11	0	0	11	1	1
2024 Macau	18	1	3	22	1	1
Total	100	8	3	111		

== Most decorated athletes ==
Most athletes are among the 2007 World Wushu Championships delegation, which additionally competed in the 2008 Beijing Wushu Tournament and the wushu event at the 2009 World Games.

Rank	Athlete	Discipline	Years	Olympic Games (unofficial)	World Games	World Championships	World Cup	Asian Games	Asian Championships	East Asian Games	Total
1	Yuan Wenqing	Taolu (changquan)	1989-97			x 9 x 1		x 2	x 4		14
2	Zhao Changjun	Taolu (changquan)	1972-87			x 8			x 4		12
3	Wu Yanan	Taolu (taijiquan)	2005-11	x 1	x 1	x 2		x 2	x 1	x 1	8
3	Yuan Xiaochao	Taolu (changquan)	2005-10	x 1	x 1	x 2		x 2	x 1	x 1	8
5	Zhao Qingjian	Taolu (changquan)	2003-09	x 1	x 1	x 3			x 1	x 1	7
5	Ma Lingjuan	Taolu (changquan)	2004-09	x 1	x 1	x 2		x 1	x 2		7
7	Sun Peiyuan	Taolu (changquan)	2009-Present			x 2	x 1	x 3			6
7	Li Fan	Taolu (nanquan)	2007-21	x 1	x 1	x 2		x 1	x 1		6
7	Gao Jiamin	Taolu (taijiquan)	1990-98			x 1		x 2 x 1	x 1	x 1	6
10	Cui Wenjuan	Taolu (taijiquan)	2007-09	x 1	x 1	x 1			x 1	x 1	5
11	Wu Zhaohua	Taolu (changquan)	2016-Present		x 1	x 1		x 1	x 1		4
11	Lai Xiaoxiao	Taolu (changquan)	2016-Present		x 1	x 1	x 1	x 1			4
11	Kan Wencong	Taolu (changquan)	2007-14			x 2		x 2			4
11	Cao Jing	Taolu (changquan)	2003-09			x 3			x 1		4

== See also ==
- 1974 China national wushu team
- Hong Kong national wushu team
- Macau national wushu team
