= List of international wushu competitions =

International wushu competitions

This is a list of notable international wushu competitions hosted by the International Wushu Federation (IWUF) and its official continental organisations.

Note: Most competitions with the "Kung Fu Championships" label were originally named "Traditional Wushu Championships" leading up to 2017.

== International ==
All major International wushu competitions are hosted by the IWUF and are aided by continental or national organisations.

=== Main events ===
- World Wushu Championships
- World Junior Wushu Championships
- World Kungfu Championships
- World Taijiquan Championships
- Taolu World Cup
- Sanda World Cup

=== Multi-sport events ===
- Wushu at the World Games
- Wushu at the World Combat Games
- Wushu at the Summer Universiade
- FISU World University Wushu Championships

=== Historical / One-off events ===
- 2008 Beijing Wushu Tournament
- 2014 Nanjing Youth Wushu Tournament

== Asia ==
All prominent continental wushu competitions in Asia are hosted by the Wushu Federation of Asia (WFA).

=== Official events ===
- Asian Wushu Championships
- Asian Junior Wushu Championships
- Asian Kung Fu Championships
- Asian Taolu Cup
- Asian Sanda Cup

=== Multi-sport events ===
- Asian Games
- Southeast Asian Games
- South Asian Games

=== Historical ===
- East Asian Games
- Asian Indoor and Martial Arts Games
- Wushu at the Islamic Solidarity Games

== Africa ==
=== Primary Events ===
- African Wushu Championships
- African Wushu Cup Championships
- African Traditional Wushu Championships

=== Multi-Sport Events ===
- African Youth Games

== Europe ==
All prominent wushu competitions in Europe are organised by the European Wushu Federation (EWUF) which was established in 1985, making it the first international or continental wushu organization ever established.

- European Wushu Championships
- European Traditional Wushu (Kungfu) Championships
- European Taijiquan and Internal Styles Wushu Championships

== Oceania ==
All major continental wushu competitions throughout Oceania are organised by the Oceania Kung Fu Wushu Federation (OKWF).

- Oceania Wushu Championships

== Pan America ==
All major continental wushu competitions throughout North and South America are organised by the Pan American Wushu Federation (PAWF).

=== Official events ===
- Pan American Wushu Championships
- Pan American Kung Fu and Taijiquan Championships

=== Historical ===
- Bolivarian Games
