= Hong Kong national wushu team =

Wushu team

Hong Kong Wushu Team
- Founded: 1990
- Continental union: WFA
- National federation: Hong Kong Wushu Union

World Games
- Appearances: 3
- Medals: x 1 x 2 x 4

World Championships
- Appearances: 16
- Medals: x 51 x 65 x 42

World Cup
- Appearances: 3
- Medals: x 11 x 5 x 3

Asian Games
- Appearances: 8
- Medals: x 2 x 13 x 6

East Asian Games
- Appearances: 8
- Medals: x 9 x 10 x 15

The Hong Kong Wushu Team represents Hong Kong in IWUF international competitions. Since its inception, it has established itself as one of the most prominent wushu teams of all time outside of the China national wushu team.

The team trains at the Hong Kong Sports Institute as a tier-A sport.

== Competition results ==
=== World Wushu Championships ===
The International Wushu Federation does not publish all-time medal tables or medal statistics per each national federation. The IWUF only publishes individual championships results and thus the tables below are compilations of those results.

Red border color indicates host nation status.

Games	Gold	Silver	Bronze	Total	Gold medals	Total Medals	References
(China) 1991 Beijing	1	4	2	7	4	3	
(Malaysia) 1993 Kuala Lumpur	2	3	4	9	3	2	
(United States) 1995 Baltimore	3	0	1	4	2	10	
(Italy) 1997 Rome	3	4	2	9	2	3	
1999 Hong Kong	6	6	5	17	2	1	
(Armenia) 2001 Yerevan	4	9	4	17	4	2	
2003 Macau	2	5	4	11	4	3	
(Vietnam) 2005 Hanoi	2	3	0	5	6	11	
(China) 2007 Beijing	2	4	4	10	5	5	
(Canada) 2009 Toronto	3	6	3	12	3	2	
(Turkey) 2011 Ankara	3	6	2	11	3	2	
(Malaysia) 2013 Kuala Lumpur	2	3	2	7	8	8	
(Indonesia) 2015 Jakarta	5	4	2	11	4	3	
(Russia) 2017 Kazan	5	3	3	11	3	3	
(China) 2019 Shanghai	5	4	1	10	3	5	
(United States) 2023 Fort Worth	3	2	3	8	4	6	
Total	51	65	42	158			

== Most decorated athletes ==
Rank	Athlete	Discipline	Years	Other muti-sport	World Games	World Championships	World Cup	Asian Games	Asian Championships	East Asian Games	Total
1	Ng Siu Ching	Changquan, Nanquan	1988-1999			x 5 x 7 x 6		x 1 x 2	x 1 x 9 x 3	x 1 x 1 x 1	37
2	Geng Xiaoling	Changquan	2007-2018	x 1 x 1		x 5 x 6 x 1		x 1 x 1	x 3 x 1 x 1	x 2	23
3	Zheng Tianhui	Changquan	2008-2016	x 1 x 1		x 3 x 5 x 2	x 1	x 1	x 1 x 1	x 2 x 2 x 2	22
4	Li Fai	Changquan, Taijiquan	1990-2002			x 4 x 2 x 3		x 1	x 3 x 3 x 1	x 1 x 1	19
4	Yuen Ka Ying	Nanquan	2008=2016			x 3 x 5 x 1	x 1 x 1	x 1	x 3 x 1	x 1 x 2	19
6	Liu Xuxu	Changquan	2015-2022			x 5 x 3 x 1	x 5 x 1	x 1			16
7	Chen Suijin	Taijiquan	2015-			x 2 x 3 x 1	x 4	x 1	x 1 x 1 x 1		14
7	He Jianxin	Nanquan	2017-			x 5 x 2 x 2	x 2 x 2 x 1				14
7	Angie Tsang	Nanquan	1999-2006			x 1 x 4 x 3		x 1	x 2 x 2	x 1	14
10	Hai Choi Lam	Changquan	1987-1990			x 4		x 1		x 5 x 3	13
