= Cheng Aiping =

Chinese wushu practitioner

Cheng Aiping 程爱萍
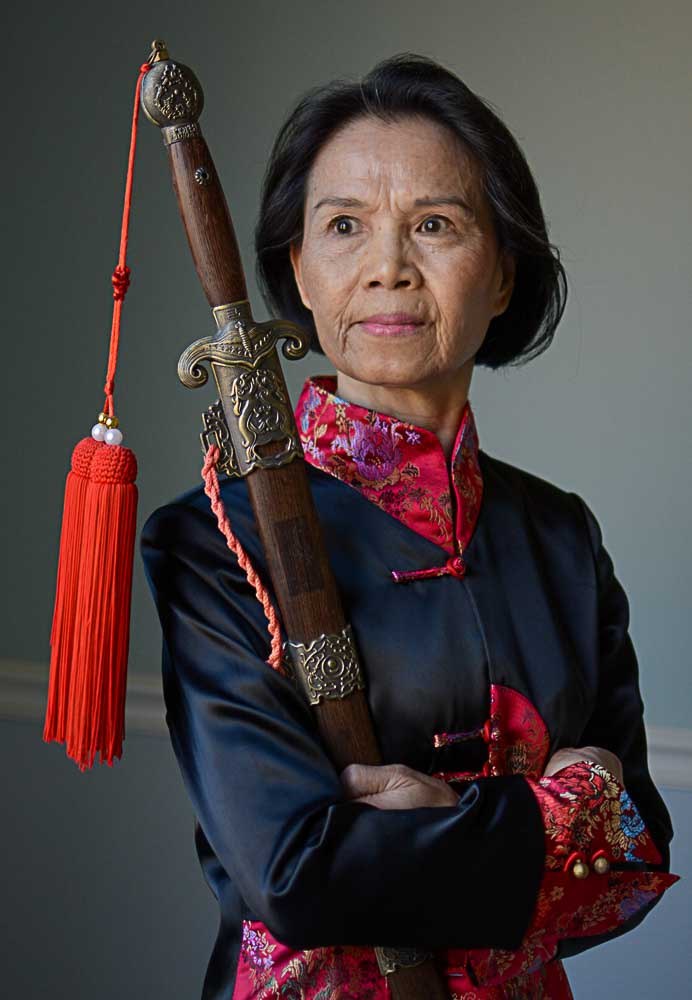
- Born: 1955 (age 70–71); Hangzhou, Zhejiang, China
- Nationality: Chinese
- Style: Yang-style tai chi Sun-style tai chi Chen-style tai chi

Other information
- Occupation: Wushu athlete, coach

Cheng Aiping (Chinese: 程爱萍; pinyin: chéng'àipíng; born 1955) is a taijiquan and wushu coach originally from China. She has been based in the United States since 1997.

== Early life ==
Cheng was born in Zhejiang in 1955 and learned to dance and perform gymnastics at a young age while growing up in Quzhou. At the age of 15 in November 1970, she was selected to take part in a one-month training program to begin learning wushu. She was one of the elite few selected to begin training and studying with the Zhejiang wushu team. She studied with Li Tianji and Fu Zhongwen for Yang-style taijiquan, Sun Jianyun (daughter of Sun Lutang) for Sun-style taijiquan, and Chen Zhenglei for Chen-style taijiquan.

== Career ==
=== Wushu athlete ===
After only studying wushu for three years, Cheng was selected to be part of the 1974 China national wushu team delegation that visited the United States and performed for most notably Richard Nixon in the White House Rose garden. The team also performed in Hawaii, San Francisco, Washington D.C., and New York City. She would be on the national team for a total of six times, performing for heads of state including Elizabeth II, Norodom Sihanouk, and Kim Il Sung.

From 1981 to 1984, Cheng studied at the Shanghai Institute of Physical Education. In 1985, Cheng competed in the 1st China National Taijiquan Championships and won a gold medal in Sun taijiquan among other medals. The same year, she was the national champion in Sun taijiquan. In 1988, Cheng was a member of the first China national taijiquan team.

=== Coaching ===
In 1980, Cheng became a coachof the Zhejiang Wushu Team. Her students include Lu Dan, the 1995 and 1997 world champion in changquan, and Fei Qiuying, the 1987 Asian champion in qiangshu. As a part of her national team appointments, she began performing and giving workshops worldwide.

In 1986, Cheng was a member of the committee which established the rules of the 2nd China National Taijiquan Championships. These rules were among a series of developments made which led to the taijiquan compulsory routine ahead of the 1990 Asian Games.

In 1997, Cheng moved to the United States. In 1999, she was named a top-level master by the International Wushu Federation, and opened her first school in Connecticut to teach taijiquan. From 2002 to 2008, Cheng organized the "Spring Festival Gala" in her region to promote Chinese culture and wushu.

She opened a second location in Austin in 2018 and is currently semi-retired from coaching. Her students have competed in the 2024 World Taijiquan Championships in Singapore.
