= Hai Choi Lam =

Chinese wushu practitioner

Personal information
- Born: Xiangshan, Zhejiang, China

Sport
- Sport: Wushu
- Event(s): Changquan, Daoshu, Gunshu
- Team: Zhejiang Wushu Team (1978-1987); Hong Kong Wushu Team (1987-1990)
Medal record
Men's Wushu Taolu
Representing Hong Kong
Invitational World Championships
Silver medal – second place	1988 Hangzhou	All-around
Silver medal – second place	1988 Hangzhou	Changquan
Silver medal – second place	1988 Hangzhou	Daoshu
Silver medal – second place	1988 Hangzhou	Gunshu
Asian Games
Bronze medal – third place	1990 Beijing	CQ All-around
Asian Championships
Silver medal – second place	1987 Yokohama	Daoshu
Silver medal – second place	1989 Hong Kong	All-around
Silver medal – second place	1989 Hong Kong	Changquan
Silver medal – second place	1989 Hong Kong	Daoshu
Silver medal – second place	1989 Hong Kong	Gunshu
Bronze medal – third place	1987 Yokohama	All-around
Bronze medal – third place	1987 Yokohama	Changquan
Bronze medal – third place	1987 Yokohama	Gunshu

Hai Choi Lam (Chinese: 奚财林; pinyin: Xīcáilín) is a retired professional wushu taolu athlete originally from Zhejiang, China, who represented British Hong Kong in international competition.

== Career ==
In 1973, Hai was selected for the Ningbo Juvenile Sports School wushu team and five years later in 1987 he joined the Zhejiang Wushu Team as a professional athlete.

In 1987, Hai was recruited to join the Hong Kong Wushu Team. He made his international debut at the 1987 Asian Wushu Championships where he won a silver medal in daoshu, and bronze medals in changquan and gunshu, thus winning the bronze medal in the all-around event. A year later, he participated in the 1988 International Invitational Wushu Championships and won silver medals in all his events and the all-around event, all under Zhao Changjun. He achieved the same medals result a year later at the 1989 Asian Wushu Championships with all of his silver medals under Yuan Wenqing. Hai's last competition was at the 1990 Asian Games where he won the bronze medal in the men's changquan all-around event.

Outside of competitive wushu, Hai opened the Hong Kong Wushu School in 1992. In 2006, he founded the Hong Kong International Wushu Competition which continues to this day and has become a major wushu competition in Asia.

== See also ==
- List of Asian Games medalists in wushu
