= 1974 China national wushu team =

Wushu team

The 1974 China National Wushu Team was a delegation formed for the purpose of promoting modern wushu internationally including for the first time in the United States. This team was formed during the era of the Cultural Revolution and ping-pong diplomacy, when traditional Chinese martial arts (commonly known as Kung Fu in the West) became restructured into modern wushu in an effort to spread Chinese culture internationally through sports. The 1974 national team notably performed for Richard Nixon in the White House Rose Garden, and included members such as a young Jet Li.

== Background ==
=== 1950s-1965: The birth of modern wushu ===
There were several attempts to standardize practical Chinese martial arts in the early 20th century including the Chin Woo Athletic Association and the Central Guoshu Institute run by the Nationalist government. Unlike the Nationalist Party, the Chinese Communist Party disliked the self-defense applications of traditional Chinese martial arts and wanted to restrict those training methods, instead favoring performance-based routines with acrobatics. As the Communist Party won the Chinese Civil War in 1949 and established control throughout the county, the Sports Commission promoted the performance-based modern wushu taolu which led to the creation of the Chinese Wushu Association (CWA) in 1958.

In 1960, Chinese delegations were sent to Czechoslovakia and Myanmar to promote Chinese culture and sport; among the delegations were wushu performance teams. Between 1961 and 1966, wushu performances in China were organized for numerous visiting politicians from Nepal, Indonesia, Mongolia, Ghana, North Korea, Afghanistan, Japan, Australia, Mali, and Tanzania.

=== 1966-1973: Reconstruction of modern wushu ===
In 1966, the Cultural Revolution began to take place in China, and the practice of any martial arts (traditional or modern) were banned. Beginning in the 1970s, restrictions began to be slowly lifted, and modern wushu taolu teams began training again. China's participation in the 1971 World Table Tennis Championships led to the start of the Ping-pong diplomacy where China started to participate in international sports competitions again. The same year, China was accepted by the Asian Games Federation ahead of the 1974 Asian Games. These developments were followed by the 1972 visit by Richard Nixon to China and the ties between China and the United States were growing closer.

In contrast to the Euro-centrist programs of the Olympic Games and Asian Games, China wanted to develop wushu to reflect their own culture on the international stage. By the early 1970s through, no other countries outside of China were aware of modern wushu on a large scale, so the Sports Commission and the CWA developed a plan to organize an exhibition team to promote wushu internationally.

== Team formation ==
In the early 1970s, municipal and provincial wushu teams began to be organized across China. Officials conducted screenings where they would test the physical abilities of youths where they would measure their stamina, flexibility, jump height, and other factors. Individuals who passed screenings were selected to become members of professional wushu teams where they would live and train for several hours each day.

During Nixon's 1972 visit to China, Henry Kissinger visited the Central Institute of Physical Education (now known as the Beijing Sport University) and was impressed with the athletic ability of Chinese wushu athletes. After discussions between Kissinger and Zhou Enlai, an agreement was signed that a Chinese national wushu team delegation would visit and perform in the United States in June 1974.

=== 1974: The National Team is Created ===
In mid-1973, the Sports Commission and the CWA created a committee to create the first national wushu team. The committee was split into two groups, one headed to the north and the other to the south. The committees assessed the abilities of wushu athletes from various provinces. 120 individuals were selected to begin training at the Beijing Worker's Stadium. In October after two months of training, 18 male and 12 female athletes were selected to join the national team. These athletes were relocated to the Shanghai University of Sport where they trained for six months. The head coach was Guo Lei with assistant coaches Zhang Shan and Wang Jiadong. Besides practicing wushu, the delegation met with British instructors for six months to learn American customs and manners.

In order to promote the artistic beauty of modern wushu, the team met with the China National Traditional Orchestra to add music to modern wushu performances for the first time. Similarly, the uniforms of the wushu team members were made in many colors and with details to provide an appealing display.

==== Men ====
- Guo Shengzhou
- Xu Jiezheng
- Wang Changkai
- Zhen Zhihua
- Niu Huailu
- Gao Xiao
- Liu Xuezhi
- Han Mingnan
- Wang Qinbao
- Yang Chenping
- Chang Fuyun
- Zhou Tao
- Yu Chiyuan
- Mo Shaoneng
- Li Chiming
- Kang Kewu
- Zheng Jiming
- Qiu Fangzhen
- Cui Yahui
- Li Lianjie (Jet Li)

==== Women ====
- Chen Daoyun
- He Weiqi
- Guo Pei
- Zhao Linyan
- Li Xiaoping
- Shi Meilin
- Cheng Aiping
- Wu Xiumei
- Xu Bin
- Bai Yanxia
- Zong Qiaozhen
- Lu Yan

Zhao Changjun, a rising champion at the time, was notably excluded from the delegation because his specialty styles, zuiquan (drunken) and houquan (monkey), were deemed as poor representations of Chinese people and culture. As a result of his exclusion, Zhao worked with his coaches to develop the modernized ditangquan, a style which kept the acrobatics of zuiquan and houquan but with a "cleaner" style.

== The national team tour ==
Shortly before the tour began, the ROC learned about the PRC's wushu troupe and quickly created the "China Star Song and Art Troupe" to tour the United States at the same time of the wushu troupe. After brief negotiations, the United States did not admit the delegation from Taiwan for the time being.

Besides the athletes of the China national wushu team, many diplomats and coaches accompanied the delegation including Huang Zhen, chairman of the Liaison Office of the PRC. During the team's entire travels, they would stay on single hotel floors to themselves, accompanied by plain-clothed National Security Agency policemen and guards stationed in the stars, elevators, and hotel lobbies. In addition, all hotel rooms of the Chinese delegation were wiretapped and so delegation members were instructed to be careful with their words even in private. One story is that Jet Li once talked to a mirror asking for ice cream and bananas, and the following day he was granted both snacks in his hotel room.

=== Timeline ===
==== Mexico ====
On June 3, 1974, the 45-member delegation of the China national wushu team departed from Beijing. The team first visited Mexico before the United States. On June 9, they gave a performance at Chapultepec in Mexico City and on June 12 in the National Palace for an audience of 5,000.

==== The United States ====
On June 21, the team departed for Honolulu, Hawaii, giving three performances for a total audience of 7,000. Jet Li almost started an international incident when he expressed enthusiasm for seeing a Chinese plane, not realizing it was from Taiwan. After this visit, the team departed for San Francisco, California. Their Wednesday June 26 performance at the SF Masonic Auditorium of great acclaim was filmed by ABC News. The team gave three more performances throughout the city. The delegation then left for New York City and performed four times at the Felt Forum (now known as The Theater at Madison Square Garden) for an audience of 17,000 including for a July 4th bash. Their successes were covered by The New York Times and The Washington Post.

===== Washington D.C. =====
On the evening of Wednesday July 10, the China national wushu team performed at The Kennedy Center. On Friday July 12, the team visited the White House and met with Richard Nixon and Henry Kissinger from 2:48pm to 3:04pm. The meeting commenced with a changquan performance by Lu Yan and a duilian set by Jet Li and Cui Yahui, all empty-hand events since weapons were not allowed to the White House. President Nixon met with the three children for a photo opportunity. President Nixon asked Jet Li to be his bodyguard. Jet Li responded saying, "I don't want to protect any individual. When I grow up, I want to defend my one billion Chinese countrymen!" Secretary Kissinger responded saying that Li is "already a fine diplomat." After the delegation's stay in Washington D. C., they set off for Hong Kong on July 14.

==== Hong Kong ====
On July 16, the China national wushu team arrived in British Hong Kong, performing in the Sunbeam Theatre on July 19. After three more performances, they left Hong Kong on July 23 and returned to mainland China.

== Legacy ==
The 1974 China national wushu team tour marked the first time modern wushu was seen in the west. Starting in the late half of the 1970s, modern wushu masters from China would emigrate to the US. In 1981, the first US wushu team was organized by Bow-sim Mark, Roger Tung, and Anthony Chan.

More national wushu teams from China were organized through the 1970s and 1980s to promote wushu internationally. With the resuming of the National Games of China and national wushu championships during the late 1970s, the focus on the national team decreased as coaches and athletes focused more on developing provincial or municipal teams. Starting with the 1985 International Invitational Wushu Championships and the 1987 Asian Wushu Championships, the Chinese national team began to be formed only for international competition purposes. The delegation that eventually became the principal international ambassador for wushu was the Beijing Wushu Team under Wu Bin.

Jet Li would become a very popular figure in the wushu community, winning the men's all-around title from 1975 until 1979 while representing Beijing. He retired after a knee injury, and later went into the film industry, starring in Shaolin Temple in 1982. This movie turned Jet Li into a popular icon throughout China and the world, thus spreading modern wushu internationally.

=== Anniversary Celebrations ===
As part of the 2019 World Wushu Championships, a 45th anniversary celebration was held for the 1974 delegation. The celebration featured a visit to the Chinese Wushu History Museum of the Shanghai University of Sport and a ceremony.

In 2024, 50th anniversary celebrations were held in Ontario, California in September, and in Beijing, China in October.

== See also ==
- China national wushu team
