= Ng Siu Ching =

Chinese wushu practitioner

Ng Siu Ching MH
Personal information
- Nickname: 武术女王 "Wushu Queen"
- Citizenship: Hong Kong (before 2000); American (after 2000)
- Born: 1968 (age 57–58) Ji'an, Jiangxi, China
- Education: Springfield College

Sport
- Sport: Wushu
- Events: Changquan, Nanquan
- Team: Hong Kong Wushu Team (1986-1999)
- Coached by: Yu Liguang, Lin Liguang
Medal record
Women's Wushu Taolu
Representing Hong Kong
World Championships
Gold medal – first place	1995 Baltimore	Nanquan
Gold medal – first place	1995 Baltimore	Qiangshu
Silver medal – second place	1991 Beijing	Changquan
Silver medal – second place	1991 Beijing	Jianshu
Silver medal – second place	1991 Beijing	Qiangshu
Silver medal – second place	1993 Kuala Lumpur	Jianshu
Silver medal – second place	1993 Kuala Lumpur	Nanquan
Bronze medal – third place	1993 Kuala Lumpur	Qiangshu
Bronze medal – third place	1995 Baltimore	Jianshu
Invitational World Championships
Silver medal – second place	1988 Hangzhou	Gunshu
Bronze medal – third place	1988 Hangzhou	All-around (CQ)
Bronze medal – third place	1988 Hangzhou	Changquan
Bronze medal – third place	1988 Hangzhou	Jianshu
Asian Games
Bronze medal – third place	1990 Beijing	CQ All-Around
Bronze medal – third place	1994 Hiroshima	Nanquan
East Asian Games
Gold medal – first place	1997 Busan	Nanquan
Silver medal – second place	1993 Shanghai	CQ All-Around
Bronze medal – third place	1993 Shanghai	Nanquan
Asian Championships
Gold medal – first place	1996 Manila	Jianshu
Silver medal – second place	1987 Yokohama	All-around
Silver medal – second place	1987 Yokohama	Changquan
Silver medal – second place	1987 Yokohama	Jianshu
Silver medal – second place	1987 Yokohama	Gunshu
Silver medal – second place	1989 Hong Kong	Changquan
Silver medal – second place	1989 Hong Kong	Jianshu
Silver medal – second place	1989 Hong Kong	Gunshu
Silver medal – second place	1992 Seoul	Qiangshu
Silver medal – second place	1996 Manila	Nanquan
Bronze medal – third place	1989 Hong Kong	All-around
Bronze medal – third place	1992 Seoul	All-around
Bronze medal – third place	1992 Seoul	Nanquan
Representing Hong Kong
World Championships
Gold medal – first place	1997 Rome	Nanquan
Gold medal – first place	1997 Rome	Jianshu
Gold medal – first place	1999 Hong Kong	Nanquan
Silver medal – second place	1997 Rome	Qiangshu
Bronze medal – third place	1999 Hong Kong	Qiangshu
Asian Games
Gold medal – first place	1998 Bangkok	Nanquan

Ng Siu Ching MH (simplified Chinese: 吴小清; traditional Chinese: 吳小清; pinyin: Wúxiǎoqīng; born 1968) is a former wushu taolu athlete from Hong Kong. She achieved an extensive medal record in international competition, becoming the first taolu athlete to win five gold medals at the World Wushu Championships. Ng also had multiple victories in the Asian Games and the East Asian Games.

== Career ==
=== Representing British Hong Kong ===
Born in Jiangxi, Ng moved to Hong Kong in 1986. Her first major international appearance was at the 1987 Asian Wushu Championships in Yokohama, Japan, where she won silver medals in changquan, gunshu, and jianshu, thus winning the silver all-around medal. A few years later at the 1990 Asian Games in Beijing, China, she won the bronze medal in the women's changquan all-around event. A year later, she competed in the 1991 World Wushu Championships also in Beijing and won three silver medals in changquan, jianshu, and qiangshu. Two years later, she competed in the 1993 East Asian Games in Shanghai, China, and won a silver medal in the women's changquan all-around event and a bronze medal in nanquan. A few months later, she competed in the 1993 World Wushu Championships in Kuala Lumpur, Malaysia and won silver medals in jianshu and nanquan and a bronze medal in qiangshu. A year later, she competed in the 1994 Asian Games and won the bronze medal in nanquan. At the 1995 World Wushu Championships in Baltimore, USA, Ng won her first gold medals in international competition, becoming world champion in nanquan and qiangshu and also winning a bronze medal in jianshu. For her final competition representing British Hong Kong, she won the gold medal in women's nanquan at the 1997 East Asian Games.

=== Representing Hong Kong SAR ===
Representing the Special Administrative Region (SAR) of Hong Kong, Ng first competed at the 1997 World Wushu Championships in Rome, Italy, where she was the world champion in nanquan and jianshu, and also won a silver medal in qiangshu. She then won a gold medal in women's nanquan at the 1998 Asian Games in Bangkok, Thailand, making her become the first athlete from Hong Kong to receive a wushu gold medal in the Asian Games. For her last competition, Ng competed at the 1999 World Wushu Championships in Hong Kong where she was the gold champion in nanquan and additionally won a bronze medal in qiangshu. After announcing her retirement, she moved to the United States to pursue a degree in sports at Springfield College.

== Competitive history ==
Year	Event	CQ	NQ	JS	QS	GS	AA
1987	Asian Championships	2nd place, silver medalist(s)		2nd place, silver medalist(s)		2nd place, silver medalist(s)	2nd place, silver medalist(s)
1989	Asian Championships	2nd place, silver medalist(s)		2nd place, silver medalist(s)		2nd place, silver medalist(s)	3rd place, bronze medalist(s)
1990	Asian Games	3		3	3		3rd place, bronze medalist(s)
1991	World Championships	2nd place, silver medalist(s)		2nd place, silver medalist(s)	2nd place, silver medalist(s)		
1992	Asian Championships		3rd place, bronze medalist(s)		2nd place, silver medalist(s)		3rd place, bronze medalist(s)
1993	East Asian Games	?	3rd place, bronze medalist(s)	?	?		2nd place, silver medalist(s)
1993	World Championships		2nd place, silver medalist(s)	2nd place, silver medalist(s)	3rd place, bronze medalist(s)		
1994	Asian Games		3rd place, bronze medalist(s)				
1995	World Championships		1st place, gold medalist(s)	3rd place, bronze medalist(s)	1st place, gold medalist(s)		
1996	Asian Championships		2nd place, silver medalist(s)	1st place, gold medalist(s)			
1997	East Asian Games		1st place, gold medalist(s)	1st place, gold medalist(s)	2nd place, silver medalist(s)		
1998	Asian Games		1st place, gold medalist(s)				
1999	World Championships		1st place, gold medalist(s)		3rd place, bronze medalist(s)		

== Awards ==
Awarded by the Hong Kong SAR Government:

- Medal of Honour (1998)

== See also ==
- List of Asian Games medalists in wushu
- World Wushu Championships § Statistics
