= Macau national wushu team =

Wushu team

Macau Wushu Team
- Founded: 1990
- Continental union: WFA
- National federation: Wushu General Association of Macau

World Championships
- Appearances: 15
- Medals: x 27 x 38 x 36

World Cup
- Appearances: 3
- Medals: x 3 x 4 x 6

Asian Games
- Appearances: 8
- Medals: x 3 x 10 x 6

East Asian Games
- Appearances: 8
- Medals: x 8 x 12 x 16

The Macau Wushu Team represents Macau in IWUF international competitions. Despite its small size, the team has been represented by some of the most medal-winning wushu athletes in the competitive wushu circuit. The Wushu General Association of Macau was founded in 1988 by Edmund Ho.

== Competition results ==
=== World Wushu Championships ===
The International Wushu Federation does not publish all-time medal tables or medal statistics per each national federation. The IWUF only publishes individual championships results and thus the tables below are compilations of those results.

Red border color indicates host nation status.

Games	Gold	Silver	Bronze	Total	Gold medals	Total Medals	References
(China) 1991 Beijing	0	1	0	1	12	12	
(Malaysia) 1993 Kuala Lumpur	0	0	1	1	21	21	
(United States) 1995 Baltimore	2	3	4	9	6	3	
(Italy) 1997 Rome	0	2	0	2	12	13	
1999 Hong Kong	1	3	1	5	7	5	
(Armenia) 2001 Yerevan	-	-	-	-	-	-	
2003 Macau	2	0	4	6	8	8	
(Vietnam) 2005 Hanoi	2	4	2	8	5	5	
(China) 2007 Beijing	3	5	4	12	2	3	
(Canada) 2009 Toronto	2	4	2	8	6	6	
(Turkey) 2011 Ankara	2	2	3	7	6	8	
(Malaysia) 2013 Kuala Lumpur	3	2	2	7	6	8	
(Indonesia) 2015 Jakarta	2	2	1	5	8	12	
(Russia) 2017 Kazan	1	3	3	7	9	10	
(China) 2019 Shanghai	2	5	5	12	5	2	
(United States) 2023 Fort Worth	5	2	4	11	3	3	
Total	27	38	36	101			

== Most decorated athletes ==
Rank	Athlete	Discipline	Years	Other muti-sport	World Championships	World Cup	Asian Games	Asian Championships	East Asian Games	Total
1	Jia Rui	Changquan	2005-2014	x 1 x 1	x 4 x 6 x 1		x 1 x 2	x 1 x 2 x 2	x 4 x 2 x 2	29
2	Li Yi	Changquan	2013-2023	x 1	x 3 x 2 x 3	x 2 x 2 x 2	x 1 x 2	x 2 x 2 x 1	x 1	24
3	Huang Junhua	Nanquan	2012-		x 2 x 6 x 1	x 1 x 1 x 2	x 1 x 1 x 1	x 5	x 2	23
4	Han Jing	Changquan	2001-2008	x 1	x 3 x 3 x 2		x 1 x 1	x 2 x 2 x 1	x 2 x 1	19
5	Sou Cho Man	Changquan	2013-	x 1	x 2 x 1 x 2	x 1 x 2 x 1		x 1 x 1 x 1	x 1	15
