= Zhang Guangde =

Chinese researcher, martial artist, educator

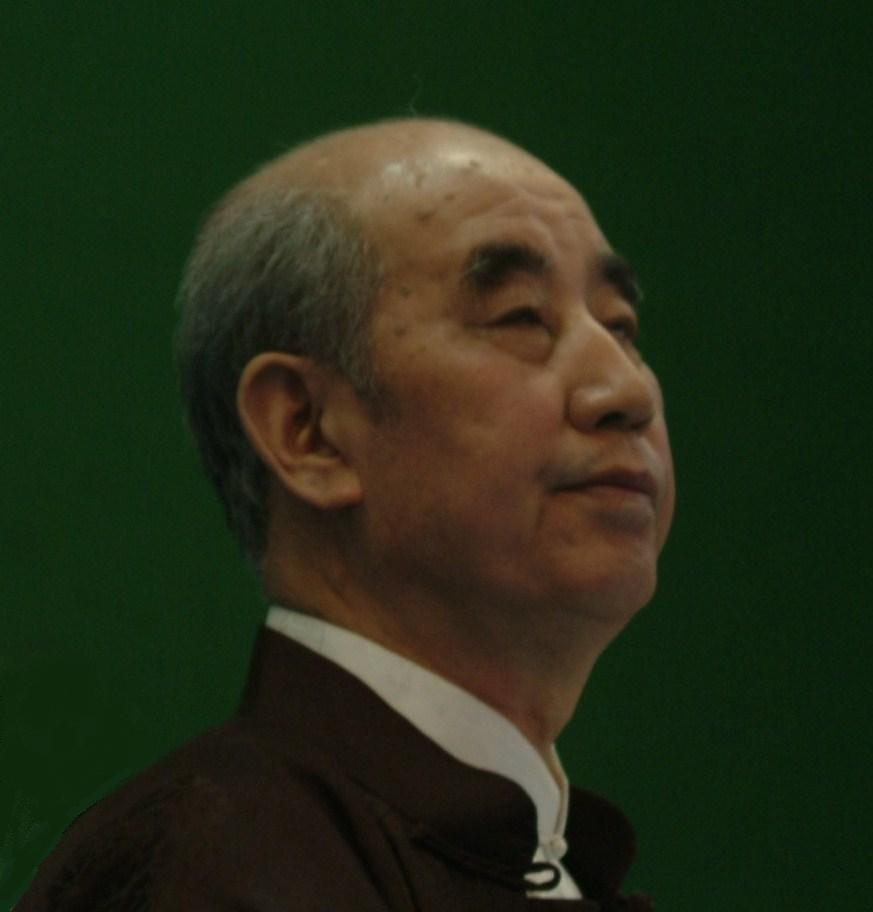
Professor Zhang Guangde, the originator of the Dao Yin Yang Sheng Gong

Zhang Guangde (Chinese: 张广德; pinyin: Zhāng Guǎngdé; 1932–2022) was a Chinese researcher, martial artist, educator, and professor at the Beijing Sport University.

He is the originator of Dao Yin Yang Sheng Gong, a form of Qigong that is widely taught in China. This system has been recognized by the Ministry of Health of the People's Republic of China, incorporated into China's education curriculum, and adopted by Chinese hospitals for the treatment of different types of ailments.

== Early life and career ==
Zhang was born in 1932 in Tangshan City, Hebei Province, China. He was educated at the Beijing Sport University, where he retired as a professor.

In 1974, he was diagnosed of tuberculosis and an allergic condition that could not be medically treated. He began to study Chinese traditional medicine, with a focus on the Daoyin method. He originated the Dao Yin Yang Sheng Gongand was believed to have cured his illness with this system and that of 86 other patients.

Zhang has been recognized for his work. He has been honored as the International Wushu Federation's One Hundred Wushu Master. He is the Chinese Wushu Association's vice president.
