= Zhao Changjun =

Chinese wushu practitioner

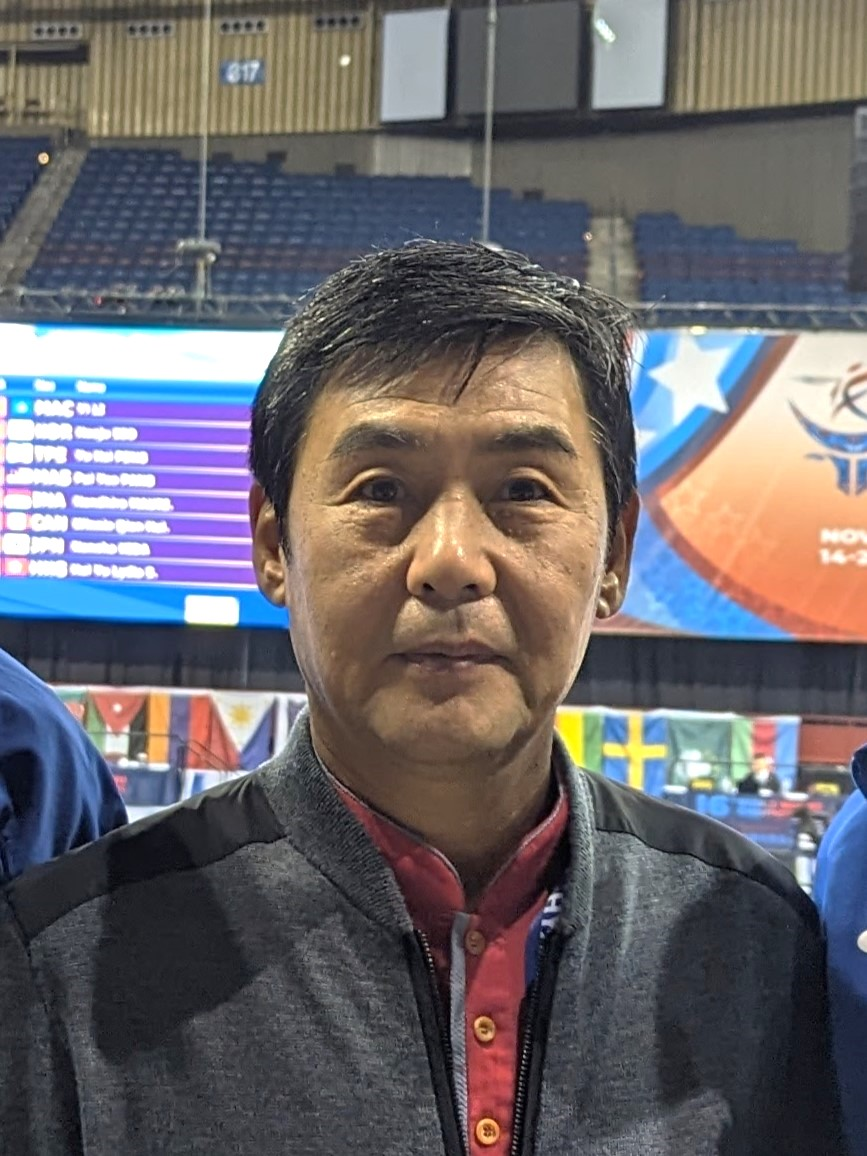
- Zhao at the 2023 World Wushu Championships in Fort Worth, USA

Personal information
- Born: 15 October 1960 (age 65) Xi'an, Shaanxi, China

Sport
- Sport: Wushu
- Events: Changquan, Daoshu, Gunshu
- Team: Shaanxi Wushu Team
Medal record
Representing China
Men's Wushu Taolu
Invitational World Championships
| Gold medal – first place | 1985 Xi'an | All-around (CQ) |
| Gold medal – first place | 1985 Xi'an | Changquan |
| Gold medal – first place | 1985 Xi'an | Daoshu |
| Gold medal – first place | 1985 Xi'an | Gunshu |
| Gold medal – first place | 1986 Tianjin | All-around (CQ) |
| Gold medal – first place | 1986 Tianjin | Changquan |
| Gold medal – first place | 1986 Tianjin | Daoshu |
| Gold medal – first place | 1986 Tianjin | Gunshu |
Asian Championships
| Gold medal – first place | 1987 Yokohama | All-around (CQ) |
| Gold medal – first place | 1987 Yokohama | Changquan |
| Gold medal – first place | 1987 Yokohama | Daoshu |
| Gold medal – first place | 1987 Yokohama | Gunshu |

Zhao Changjun (Chinese: 赵长军; pinyin: Zhàozhǎngjūn; born October 25, 1960) is a retired professional wushu taolu athlete from China. He is regarded as one of the greatest wushu athletes of all time. In wushu circles, it is commonly said the 1970s belonged to Jet Li, the 1980s to Zhao Changjun, and the 1990s to Yuan Wenqing.

== Early life ==
Zhao was born in October 1960 to a poor Hui family in Xi'an, Shaanxi. He started practicing wushu at the age of six, studying with Yuan Runsheng and learning various traditional styles. He briefly had to stop training because of the Cultural Revolution where martial arts instructors were often purged. In 1970, he resumed training and was accepted into the Shaanxi provincial wushu team to train under Bai Wenxiang, then later Yu Baiwen and Ma Zhenbang.

== Career ==
=== Competitive career ===
In 1972, Zhao met Jet Li for the first time in national competition. The judges, not favoring to distinguish between both athletes, gave both of them an "Excellent Performance Award." In 1974, Zhao was considered for the 1974 China national wushu team tour to the United States but was rejected because his specialty styles, zuiquan and houquan, were looked down upon, as they were not favorable styles which represented Chinese people. As a result, Zhao worked with his coaches to develop the modernized version of ditangquan, which carries the acrobatics and athleticism of zuiquan and houquan. Despite this, he was able to travel to Japan to perform.

During the mid-1970s, Zhao would be overshadowed by the success of Jet Li, who would eventually retire after the 4th National Games of China in 1979. Starting in 1978, Zhao would gold medals at every national championships and from 1980 to 1988, he won the all-around national championship title for eight years in a row. At the National Games of China, he won seven gold medals scattered across four renditions.

Starting in 1984, Zhao was appointed as a deputy director of the Shaanxi Sports Technical College and become a coach of the Shaanxi Wushu Team.

In May 1985 when Muhammad Ali visited China, Zhao had the opportunity to meet him and engage in light sparring.

In 1985, the first International Invitational Wushu Championships were held in Xi'an, and Zhao won three gold medals as well as the all-around title. After the competition, he was approached by Bow-sim Mark from the United States, and accepted her plea to let him teach her son, Donnie Yen, for a year. In 1986 in the second International Invitational Wushu Championships in Tianjin, Zhao was once again a triple gold medalist and the all-around title winner. In 1987, the Wushu Federation of Asia (WFA) was formed and at the first Asian Wushu Championships in Yokohama, Japan, Zhao won the men's all-around title, becoming the first official Asian wushu champion. After this success, he retired from competitive wushu. He proceeded to teach at the Shaanxi Sports Technical College and became the head coach of the Shaanxi Wushu Team.

=== Acting career ===
Following the success of Shaolin Temple (1982) which starred Jet Li, a martial arts movie titled Wudang (1983) was released which starred Zhao. The film was poorly received due to its writing and was pulled out of shelves after eight days in 1984. Despite this, Zhao's fame rose due to his lead role, and began to participate in film and television dramas including the "New Fang Shiyu" series, "The Broadsword King Five" and "The Jade Blood Sword." In 1987 after his retirement from competitive wushu, he started in the 16-episode series "Legend of Sea Lantern" which was positively received. In 1990, Zhao went to Hong Kong after being invited by Sammo Hung to work on Blade of Fury (1990). The film was poorly received, was only screened for nine days, and thus the production company had to close due to bankruptcy and the actors were left without much payment. After participating in The Strong Man Broken Arm by Longxiang Pictures, the repeated failures led Zhao to briefly retire from the film industry.

== Post-retirement ==
In 1989, he was invited by the Chinese Wushu Association to record and perform the first compulsory daoshu routine which would be used by the International Wushu Federation. In 1990 ahead of wushu's first appearance at the Asian Games, he served as the team coach for Malaysia.

After working in the Hong Kong film industry, he moved back to Xi'an to open the Zhao Changjun Wushu Institute. Sammo Hung would also work at this school. In 2007, he moved to the United States and taught in New Jersey. In 2020, he returned to China and assumed the position as a distinguished professor and head of the wushu department at the Xi'an International Studies University.

== Filmography ==
| Year | English Title | Original Title | Role | Notes |
|---|---|---|---|---|
| 1983 | The Undaunted Wudang | 武當 | Si Ma Jian | |
| 1984 | The New Legend of Fong Sai-yuk | 新方世玉 | Fong Sai-yuk | |
| 1986 | The New Legend of Fong Sai-yuk II | 新方世玉續集 | Fong Sai-yuk | |
| 1990 | The Brave Spirit | 鐵血軍魂 | Zhao Changjiang | |
| 1985 | Big Blade Wang Wu | 大刀王五 | Hou Xia | |
| 1991 | Pure Blood Sabre | 碧血寶刀 | Qiu Wenhuan | |
| 1993 | Blade of Fury | 一刀傾城 / 神州第一刀 | Yuan Shikai | Also known as Yat do king sing |
| 1993 | White Lotus Cult | 白蓮邪神 | | Also known as Bai lian xie shen |
| 1994 | One-Armed Hero | 壯士斷臂 | | Also known as Zhuang shi duan bi |

=== Television ===
| Year | English Title | Original Title | Role | Notes |
|---|---|---|---|---|
| 1987 | Legend of Sea Lantern | 海燈傳奇 | Fan Wubing | 16 episodes |
| 1989 | Legend of the Famen Temple Buddha Bone | 法門寺佛骨傳奇 | | |
| 1989 | Qian Qiu Hua Xia Jian | 千秋華夏劍 | | |

== Awards ==
By the Chinese Wushu Association:

- Top Ten Chinese Wushu Athletes (1995)

== See also ==
- China national wushu team § Most decorated athletes
