= Yuan Wenqing =

Chinese wushu practitioner (born 1966)

Personal information
- Nickname: 武术王子 "The Prince of Wushu"
- Born: 1966 (age 59–60) Shanxi, China
- Occupations: Martial artist, athlete, coach

Sport
- Sport: Wushu
- Events: Changquan, Daoshu, Gunshu
- Team: Shanxi Wushu Team
- Coached by: Pang Lin Tai and Zhang Ling Mei
- Retired: 1994, 1997
Medal record
Representing China
Men's Wushu Taolu
World Championships
Gold medal – first place	1993 Kuala Lumpur	Daoshu
Gold medal – first place	1997 Rome	Changquan
Invitational World Championships
Gold medal – first place	1988 Hangzhou	All-around
Gold medal – first place	1988 Hangzhou	Changquan
Gold medal – first place	1988 Hangzhou	Gunshu
Gold medal – first place	1990 Kuala Lumpur	All-around
Gold medal – first place	1990 Kuala Lumpur	Changquan
Gold medal – first place	1990 Kuala Lumpur	Daoshu
Gold medal – first place	1990 Kuala Lumpur	Gunshu
Silver medal – second place	1988 Hangzhou	Daoshu
Asian Games
Gold medal – first place	1990 Beijing	CQ All-around
Gold medal – first place	1994 Hiroshima	CQ All-around
Asian Championships
Gold medal – first place	1989 Hong Kong	All-around
Gold medal – first place	1989 Hong Kong	Changquan
Gold medal – first place	1989 Hong Kong	Daoshu
Gold medal – first place	1989 Hong Kong	Gunshu

Yuan Wenqing (Chinese: 原文庆; pinyin: Yuánwén qìng; born 1966) is a retired professional wushu taolu athlete from Shanxi, China. Nicknamed 'the prince of wushu,' he was known for his explosive speed and power, and is still widely regarded as one of the greatest wushu practitioners of all time. It has been said that in the sport of wushu, the 1970s belonged to Jet Li, the 1980s to Zhao Changjun, and the 1990s to Yuan Wenqing.

== Career ==
=== Early career ===
Yuan started practicing wushu around the age of eight. At the age of 10, he entered his city's amateur sports school and in 1977, he joined the Shanxi Provincial Wushu Team and began to train under Pang Lin Tai and later Zhang Ling Mei.

=== Rise to stardom ===
In 1982, he won his first national championship gold medal which was in shuangdao. After having several more national championship victories, he was chosen to compete in the 1989 Asian Wushu Championships where he achieved a gold medal sweep to win the men's all around title. Yuan was then chosen by the Chinese Wushu Association to aid them in choreographing the first set of compulsory routines to be used by the International Wushu Federation. The CWA used his changquan and gunshu routines and made minor adjustments to make them easier to execute, and the routines were later recorded by Yuan the same year.

A year later in 1990, Yuan competed in the 1990 Asian Games in Beijing, wushu's inaugural debut at the Asian Games, and won the gold medal in men's changquan. Yuan then competed in the 1993 National Games of China with much success. Later that year, he competed in the 1993 World Wushu Championships and became the world champion in men's daoshu. He returned to the 1994 Asian Games in Hiroshima, Japan, and won once again in men's changquan despite a recent injury.

He briefly retired from competitive wushu and acted in Iron Monkey 2 alongside Donnie Yen in 1996. He returned to competition in 1997 by request of his coach, Pang Lin Tai, who wished to have a successful competitive season during his last year as coach of the team. Yuan was chosen to compete in the 1997 World Wushu Championships in Rome, Italy, where he became the world champion in changquan. His last competition was the 1997 National Games of China where he won gold medals in changquan and daoshu/gunshu combined. He finally announced his formal retirement from wushu at the age of 31.

=== Teaching ===
In 2004, Yuan opened a wushu school in Shanxi. His students competed and achieved many victories at the Hong Kong International Wushu Grand Prix in 2007 which marked the 10-year anniversary of the return of Hong Kong to China.

== Competitive history ==
Year	Event	CQ	DS	GS	AA	DTQ	SD
1983	National Championships					3rd place, bronze medalist(s)	3rd place, bronze medalist(s)
1984	National Championships	?	?	?	5		1st place, gold medalist(s)
1985	National Championships	?	2nd place, silver medalist(s)	?	4		2nd place, silver medalist(s)
1986	National Championships			1st place, gold medalist(s)			1st place, gold medalist(s)
1987	National Games	?	?	?	1st place, gold medalist(s)		
1988	International Championships	1st place, gold medalist(s)	2nd place, silver medalist(s)	1st place, gold medalist(s)	1st place, gold medalist(s)		
1989	Asian Championships	1st place, gold medalist(s)	1st place, gold medalist(s)	1st place, gold medalist(s)	1st place, gold medalist(s)		
1990	International Championships	1st place, gold medalist(s)	1st place, gold medalist(s)	1st place, gold medalist(s)	1st place, gold medalist(s)		
1990	Asian Games	1st place, gold medalist(s)	1st place, gold medalist(s)	1st place, gold medalist(s)	1st place, gold medalist(s)		
1993	National Games	3rd place, bronze medalist(s)	?	?	1st place, gold medalist(s)		
1993	World Championships		1st place, gold medalist(s)				
1994	Asian Games	1st place, gold medalist(s)	1st place, gold medalist(s)	1st place, gold medalist(s)	1st place, gold medalist(s)		
1995	Retired						
1996	Retired						
1997	World Championships	1st place, gold medalist(s)					
1997	National Games	1st place, gold medalist(s)	?	?	1st place, gold medalist(s)		

== Legacy ==
In the World Wushu Championships, Yuan's changquan and gunshu routines were used from 1993 to 2001. His routines are still used by Group B athletes who compete in the World Junior Wushu Championships since the event's conception in 2006.

== Film ==
Yuan Wenqing co-starred alongside Donnie Yen in the 1996 film Iron Monkey 2, directed by Yuen Woo-Ping. In the film, Wenqing played the character Jin, a peasant with extraordinary martial prowess who gets embroiled in an arms smuggling plot.

== Personal life ==
Yuan Wenqing is a cousin of Yuan Xindong and an uncle of Yuan Xiaochao, both of which were also members of the Shaanxi Provincial Wushu Team.

== See also ==
- List of Asian Games medalists in wushu
- China national wushu team § Most decorated athletes
