= South African Wushu Federation =

Sports governing body in South Africa

- Sport: Wushu
- Abbreviation: SAWF
- Founded: 2002
- Affiliation: International Wushu Federation
- Affiliation date: 2003
- Regional affiliation: African Wushu Federation
- Headquarters: Cape Town
- Location: 1st Floor, High Court Chambers, 30 Keerom Street
- President: Jurgens Lamprecht
- Secretary: Tammy Davey

Official website
- www.sawushufederation.org.za
- (South Africa)

The South African Wushu Federation (SAWF) is the national governing body for the development and promotion of the sport of wushu also known as kung fu in South Africa. The Federation was formed in 2002.

The Federation is affiliated with SRSA and SASCOC. SAWF is a member of the International Wushu Federation (IWUF) and the African Wushu Federation (AFWF). SAWF organises national tournaments involving its provincial wushu practitioners where they compete in the various disciplines such as the Taolu divisions (IWUF mandatory Taolu routines), Tui Shou, Sanshou (full-contact fights), and Chi Sau. The tournaments are used to select official National Wushu teams to participate at international competitions such as World Wushu Championships and African Wushu Championships.

== History ==
The South African Wushu Federation was established in 2002 and became an affiliate member of the world governing body IWUF in 2003. SAWF was established based on the values of Chinese martial arts ethics and supports the adherence to these principles by all its members, associations and clubs. SAWF send candidates for accreditation as international judges using the examination programmes approved by IWUF, and also trains national grade judges aligned with international best practises sanctioned by IWUF. Wushu is a small but growing sport in South Africa and SAWF faces funding challenges with sending its athletes to international competitions.

== Tournaments ==
- SA National Championship
- SA Open Championship

== See also ==
- Sport in South Africa
