= Carlos Baylon Jr. =

Filipino wushu practitioner (born 1997)

Personal information
- Nationality: Filipino
- Born: October 7, 1997 (age 29) La Carlota, Negros Occidental, Philippines

Sport
- Country: Philippines
- Sport: Wushu
- Event: Sanda
Medal record
Representing Philippines
Event	1st	2nd	3rd
World Games	0	0	1
World Championships	0	1	0
World Cup	1	0	0
Southeast Asian Games	0	0	1
Total	1	1	2
World Games
Bronze medal – third place	2025 Chengdu	56 kg
World Championships
Silver medal – second place	2025 Brasília	56 kg
World Cup
Gold medal – first place	2025 Jiangyin	56 kg
Southeast Asian Games
Bronze medal – third place	2023 Phnom Penh	56 kg

Carlos Fernandez Baylon Jr. (born October 7, 1997) is a Filipino wushu athlete specializing in sanda, primarily in the 56 kg category. He has won medals for the Philippines at the SEA Games, Sanda World Cup, World Games, and the World Wushu Championships.

== Early life ==
Carlos Fernandez Baylon Jr. was born on October 7, 1997, in La Carlota, Negros Occidental, Philippines.

== Career ==
Baylon was part of the Filipino team in the 2019 SEA Games.

In May 2023, Baylon competed at the 2023 SEA Games, where he won the bronze medal.

In April 2025, at the Sanda World Cup, Baylon won the gold medal by defeating Saydullo Abdurashitov in the final. In August 2025, at the 2025 World Games, he won the bronze medal in which he defeated Islam Karimov, making him the first Filipino wushu practitioner to win a medal at the World Games. A month later, at the 2025 World Wushu Championships, he won the silver medal, which was his first medal in the championships.
