= Li Fai =

Hong Kong wushu practitioner

Li Fai MH
Personal information
- Born: 30 May 1969 (age 57) Guilin, Guangxi, China
- Occupation(s): Martial artist, athlete, actor

Sport
- Sport: Wushu
- Event(s): Changquan, Taijiquan
- Team: Hong Kong Wushu Team
- Coached by: Yu Liguong, Meng Huifeng, Lin Liguang
- Retired: 2002
- Now coaching: Juanita Mok
Medal record
Women's Wushu Taolu
Representing Hong Kong
World Championships
Gold medal – first place	1993 Kuala Lumpur	Changquan
Gold medal – first place	1993 Kuala Lumpur	Gunshu
Silver medal – second place	1991 Beijing	Gunshu
Bronze medal – third place	1991 Beijing	Changquan
Bronze medal – third place	1991 Beijing	Qiangshu
Bronze medal – third place	1993 Kuala Lumpur	Jianshu
Asian Championships
Gold medal – first place	1992 Seoul	Gunshu
Silver medal – second place	1992 Seoul	Changquan
Silver medal – second place	1992 Seoul	Jianshu
Silver medal – second place	1992 Seoul	All-around (CQ)
Bronze medal – third place	1989 Hong Kong	Qiangshu
East Asian Games
Bronze medal – third place	1993 Shanghai	Changquan
Representing Hong Kong
World Championships
Gold medal – first place	1999 Hong Kong	Taijijian
Gold medal – first place	2001 Yerevan	Taijijian
Silver medal – second place	1999 Hong Kong	Taijiquan
Asian Games
Silver medal – second place	2002 Busan	Taijiquan
Asian Championships
Gold medal – first place	2000 Hanoi	Taijiquan
Gold medal – first place	2000 Hanoi	All-around (TJQ)
East Asian Games
Gold medal – first place	2001 Osaka	Taijiquan

Li Fai MH (traditional Chinese: 李暉; simplified Chinese: 李晖; pinyin: Lǐ huī; born 30 May 1969) is a retired professional wushu taolu athlete from Hong Kong. She was a four-time world champion and a medalist at the Asian Games and the East Asian Games.

== Early life ==
Li was born in Guilin, Guangxi. As a child, she studied Guilin Opera and when she moved to Hong Kong at the age of 15, she was hired as a traditional dancer at a nearby village. While working there, she was spotted by Hong Kong film director Ching Siu-tung and was recruited to help stand-in for actresses. Eventually she became interested in the sport of contemporary wushu and began seriously training in 1989.

== Career ==
=== Early competitive career: 1989–1994 ===
Li's international debut was at the 1990 Asian Games where she finished in fourth place in the women's changquan all-around event. In the 1991 World Wushu Championships in Beijing, China, she won a silver medal in gunshu and bronze medals in changquan and qiangshu. In 1992 at the Asian Wushu Championships in Seoul, South Korea, she won a gold medal in gunshu, and silver medals in jianshu and changquan, thus earning the changquan all-around silver medal.

Li then won the bronze medal in women's changquan all-around at the 1993 East Asian Games in Shanghai, China. Shortly after this event, she announced that she was planning to retire from competitive wushu after her next competition, the 1993 World Wushu Championships in Kuala Lumpur, Malaysia, to focus on her career as a stunt-woman. A few months later at the competition, she became the world champion in changquan and gunshu. She also won a bronze medal in jianshu. With these victories, she decided to continue her competitive wushu career.

In May 1994, Li developed a mysterious severe illness but recovered in time to perform exceedingly well in the Hong Kong team trials for the 1994 Asian Games. Shortly after this, Li discovered she was pregnant, and so she dropped out of the Asian Games.

=== Return to competitive wushu: 1998–2002 ===
In 1998, Li returned to practicing wushu and decided to specialize in taijiquan. She trained in secret for a year until August 1999, when the head coach of the Hong Kong wushu team, Yu Liguang, announced her return to competition. Under the Special Administrative Region (SAR) of Hong Kong for the first time, Li appeared at the 1999 World Wushu Championships in Hong Kong and became the first world champion in taijijian and also won a silver medal in taijiquan. Two years later at the 2001 East Asian Games in Osaka, Japan, she was the flag-bearer and won the gold medal in women's taijiquan. Li then competed in the 2001 World Wushu Championships in Yerevan, Armenia, and was the world champion in taijijian. Ahead of her participation at the 2002 Asian Games, her last competition, she was noted as one of the key potential gold medal winners for Hong Kong. She ended up winning the silver medal in women's taijiquan and later announced her retirement from competition.

=== Post-retirement ===
In 2000, she opened her school, the "Li Fai Wushu Center". Following her retirement as a competitive wushu athlete in 2002, she actively promoted wushu throughout Hong Kong through teaching and demonstrating. In 2003 during the 2002–2004 SARS outbreak, she taught taiji on Hong Kong television. In 2004, Li Fai performed with Bobby McFerrin in Hong Kong and in 2006, Li was awarded the Medal of Honour in sport by the Hong Kong SAR government. In 2012, she taught taijiquan to the President of Ireland, Michael D. Higgins, and First Lady Sabina Higgins at the World Economic Forum. That same year, she performed in the Diamond Jubilee of Elizabeth II as well as in the 2012 Summer Olympics opening ceremony.

In 2018, one of Li's students, Juanita Mok, won the silver medal in women's taijiquan at the 2018 Asian Games.

== Personal life ==
Li Fai comes from a lineage of taiji and qigong experts in China. Her great-grandfather, Li Yulin, was a student of Sun Lutang, the progenitor of Sun-style taijiquan. Her grandfather, Li Tianchi, was said to be one of the individuals who developed the 24-form taijiquan in 1956. Li Fai's father, Li Deyin, is a prominent coach, judge, and official in China. He held senior positions in the Chinese Wushu Association, was the head judge at the 1990 Asian Games, and was one of the creators of the 42-form taijiquan in 1989.

== Awards ==
Awarded by the Hong Kong SAR Government:

- Medal of Honour (2006)

Hong Kong Sports Stars Awards:

- "Hong Kong Outstanding Athlete" (1992, 1993, 1999, 2001, 2002)

== See also ==
- List of Asian Games medalists in wushu
