= Narges Shahbazi =

Iranian wushu practitioner

Personal information
- Nationality: Iranian
- Born: 20 August 2007 (age 18) Tehran, Iran
- Height: 170 cm (5 ft 7 in)
- Weight: 60 kg (132 lb)

Sport
- Country: Iran
- Sport: Wushu
- Event: Changquan
Medal record
Representing Iran
Asian Junior Championships
Gold medal – first place	2023 Macau	Changquan
World Junior Championships
Gold medal – first place	2021 China	Changquan

Narges Shahbazi (born 20 August 2007 in Tehran) is an Iranian wushu athlete. She won the gold medal in the changquan event at the 11th Asian Junior Wushu Championships in 2023, held in Macau.
