= Wushu at the 1990 Asian Games – Women's changquan combined =

Women's changquan combined at the 1990 Asian Games
- Venue: Haidian Gymnasium
- Dates: 1–4 October 1990

Medalists
gold medal	Wang Ping	China
silver medal	Peng Ying	China
bronze medal	Ng Siu Ching	Hong Kong

The women's changquan three events combined competition (changquan, short weapon and long weapon) at the 1990 Asian Games in Beijing, China was held from 1 to 4 October at the Haidian Gymnasium.

== Results ==
* The results are incomplete.

Rank	Athlete	Daoshu or Jianshu	Changquan	Gunshu or Qiangshu	Total
1st place, gold medalist(s)	Wang Ping (CHN)	9.78	9.85	9.86	29.49
2nd place, silver medalist(s)	Peng Ying (CHN)	9.78	9.76	9.80	29.34
3rd place, bronze medalist(s)	Ng Siu Ching (HKG)	9.38	9.43	9.46	28.27
4	Li Fai (HKG)	9.25	9.31	9.33	27.89
5	Atsuko Maehigashi (JPN)	9.36	9.18	9.31	27.85
6	Ko Tuan-fang (TPE)	9.25			27.83
7	Kaori Nakai (JPN)	9.16	9.08	9.31	27.55
9	Yuri Kaminiwa (JPN)	9.05	9.03	9.11	27.19
	Kamala Lopchan (NEP)	8.80	9.03	9.00	26.83
