= 2014 Nanjing Youth Wushu Tournament =

Wushu competition

Tournament information
- Sport: Wushu
- Location: Nanjing, China
- Dates: August 22–24, 2014
- Venue: Gaochun Gymnasium
- Participants: 100 athletes, 35 countries

The 2014 Nanjing Youth Wushu Tournament was a wushu competition which was held from August 22 to 24, 2014 at the Gaochun Gymnasium in Nanjing, China. The name "Nanjing Youth Wushu Tournament" was used to specify that wushu was only an invitational sport at the 2014 Summer Youth Olympics and not an official event.

The International Olympic Committee (IOC) gave the International Wushu Federation (IWUF) an opportunity to host a wushu competition alongside the 2008 Summer Olympics in Beijing, China which was known as the 2008 Beijing Wushu Tournament. This was done as a special circumstance and so wushu did not have official demonstration sport status. In 2014 as part of the Summer Youth Olympics, wushu was featured as an official demonstration event, but medals earned at this tournament did not contribute to the Olympic medal table.

Wushu was also part of the Nanjing Sports Lab which was a promotional event for non-Olympic sports. Taolu athletes from around the world took part in this event which featured performances and teaching sessions. The Nanjing Sports Lab was held at the Yuzui Wetland Park.

== Qualification ==
Athletes qualified at the 2014 World Junior Wushu Championships which was held in March. Invitation to the 2014 Nanjing Youth Wushu Tournament was exclusively for select athletes between the ages of 16 and 18, or Group A athletes. All taolu athletes had to perform routines from the IWUF 3rd set of compulsory routines which were created in 2012.

== Medal summary ==
Nations are ranked according to the similar proceedings of the World Wushu Championships and World Junior Wushu Championships, which follow normal procedures for Olympic events. Countries are ranked by number of gold medals earned, followed by number of silver medals earned, followed by number of bronze medals earned. National federations which did not earn a medal are not shown in the table below.

* Host nation (Host nation (China))

2014 Nanjing Youth Wushu Tournament Medal Table
Rank	NOC	Gold	Silver	Bronze	Total
1	China (CHN)*	8	0	0	8
2	Indonesia (INA)	2	1	0	3
3	Vietnam (VIE)	2	0	0	2
4	United States (USA)	1	0	4	5
5	Malaysia (MAS)	1	0	3	4
6	France (FRA)	1	0	1	2
7	Singapore (SIN)	0	3	0	3
8	Iran (IRI)	0	2	1	3
9	Azerbaijan (AZE)	0	1	2	3
9	Turkey (TUR)	0	1	2	3
11	Egypt (EGY)	0	1	0	1
11	Hong Kong (HKG)	0	1	0	1
11	India (IND)	0	1	0	1
11	Japan (JPN)	0	1	0	1
11	Kazakhstan (KAZ)	0	1	0	1
11	Myanmar (MYA)	0	1	0	1
11	South Korea (KOR)	0	1	0	1
18	Russia (RUS)	0	0	2	2
19	Canada (CAN)	0	0	1	1
19	Chinese Taipei (TPE)	0	0	1	1
19	Netherlands (NED)	0	0	1	1
19	Tunisia (TUN)	0	0	1	1
19	Turkmenistan (TKM)	0	0	1	1
Totals (23 entries)		15	15	20	50

=== Taolu ===
Event	Gold		Silver		Bronze	
Men's Changquan	Wu Zhong (CHN)	9.60	Kelvin Young (INA)	9.55	Wesley Huie (USA)	9.54
Men's Daoshu & Gunshu combined	Kelvin Young (INA)	18.90	Park Geunwoo (KOR)	18.83	Sergei Badrutdinov (RUS)	18.83
Men's Nanquan & Nangun combined	Liu Yi Kai (CHN)	19.06	Abdelrahman Soliman (EGY)	18.92	Calvin Lee (MAS)	18.91
Men's Jianshu & Qiangshu combined	Paul Rondeau (FRA)	18.87	Jesse Adalia (SIN)	18.85	Wesley Huie (USA)	18.77
Men's Taijiquan & Taijijian combined	Nicholas (INA)	18.82	Zhuang Jia (HKG)	18.71	Tim Sastrowiardjo (NED)	18.63
Women's Changquan	Loh Ying Ting (MAS)	9.56	Wei Ting Zoe Mui (SIN)	9.46	Liu Ting-ting (TPE)	9.35
Women's Daoshu & Gunshu combined	Amy Li (USA)	18.82	Wei Ting Zoe Mui (SIN)	18.74	Ying Ting Loh (MAS)	18.68
Women's Nanquan & Nandao combined	Nhat Quynh Lam (VIE)	18.39	Aye Thit Sar Myint (MYA)	18.38	Anita Kar-Yan Chew (CAN)	18.27
Women's Jianshu & Qiangshu combined	Wang Yipeng (CHN)	19.06	Elif Akyuz (TUR)	18.74	Emily Fan (USA)	18.72
Women's Taijiquan & Taijijian combined	Huang Xueqing (CHN)	19.15	Usui Kanon (JPN)	19.03	Chan Lu Yi (MAS)	18.92

=== Sanda ===
Event	Gold	Silver	Bronze
Men's 52 kg	Li Yage (CHN)	Mahdi Mohammadi (IRI)	Valiyev Ilkin (AZE)
Men's 52 kg	Li Yage (CHN)	Mahdi Mohammadi (IRI)	Oliver Moua (FRA)
Men's 60 kg	Guo Jiafeng (CHN)	Bayram Shammandov (AZE)	Budakli Sefer (TUR)
Men's 60 kg	Guo Jiafeng (CHN)	Bayram Shammandov (AZE)	Paris Moran (USA)
Men's 70 kg	Han Chu (CHN)	Talgat Serikbay (KAZ)	Yerkin Osmanov (AZE)
Men's 70 kg	Han Chu (CHN)	Talgat Serikbay (KAZ)	Mohsen Shahbazi (IRI)
Women's 52 kg	Cao Weiqing (CHN)	Chaoba Devi Ningthoujam (IND)	Khouloud Charfeddine (TUN)
Women's 52 kg	Cao Weiqing (CHN)	Chaoba Devi Ningthoujam (IND)	Merjin Saparova (TKM)
Women's 60 kg	Thi Trang Nguyen (VIE)	Saba Sharifi (IRI)	Daria Kozhokina (RUS)
Women's 60 kg	Thi Trang Nguyen (VIE)	Saba Sharifi (IRI)	Mihriban Burcin Aygir (TUR)

== Results ==
=== Taolu ===
==== Men's changquan ====
Rank	Athlete	Score
1	Wu Zhong (CHN)	9.60
2	Kelvin Young (INA)	9.55
3	Wesley Huie (USA)	9.54
4	Etienne Lee Zhe Xuan (SIN)	9.52
5	Sergei Badrutdinov (RUS)	9.34

==== Men's daoshu & gunshu combined ====
Rank	Athlete	Daoshu	Gunshu	Total
1	Kelvin Young (INA)	9.49	9.41	18.90
2	Park Geunwoo (KOR)	9.29	9.54	18.83
3	Sergei Badrutdinov (RUS)	9.40	9.43	18.83
4	Khaw Jun Lim (MAS)	9.31	9.45	18.76
5	Amr Kasem (EGY)	9.55	9.15	18.70
6	Sein Thi Ha Aung (MYA)	9.01	9.46	18.47
7	Yotekatl Guerrero (MEX)	9.08	9.39	18.47
8	Sefa Erez (TUR)	9.33	9.04	18.37
9	Wu Chi In (MAC)	9.02	9.12	18.14
10	Idanbarys Zholdasbay (KAZ)	8.70	9.11	17.81

==== Men's jianshu & qiangshu combined ====
Rank	Athlete	Jianshu	Qiangshu	Total
1	Paul Rondeau (FRA)	9.50	9.37	18.87
2	Jesse Adalia (SIN)	9.45	9.40	18.85
3	Wesley Huie (USA)	9.47	9.30	18.77
4	Nima Rahnema (CAN)	9.49	9.27	18.76
5	Stanislav Lifantcev (RUS)	9.47	8.97	18.44
6	Nodir Khasanov (UZB)	9.04	9.36	18.40
7	Martin Huang Mermida (PER)	9.07	8.72	17.79

==== Men's nanquan & nangun combined ====
Rank	Athlete	Nanquan	Nangun	Total
1	Liu Yi Kai (CHN)	9.58	9.48	18.90
2	Abdelrahman Ehab (EGY)	9.51	9.41	18.83
3	Calvin Lee (MAS)	9.50	9.41	18.83
4	Chio Wai Keong (MAC)	9.45	9.02	18.76
5	Dmytro Koliesnikov (UKR)	9.47	8.95	18.70
6	Muhammet Kuyucu (TUR)	9.44	8.47	18.47
7	Yeh Tsai-yung (TPE)	8.56	9.31	18.47
8	Gevorg Yeritsyan (ARM)	8.96	8.85	17.81
9	Daniel Shing Yi Chen (BRA)	DNS	6.97	6.97
10	Tsz Wing Lau (HKG)	DNS	DNS	DNS

==== Men's taijiquan & taijijian combined ====
Rank	Athlete	Taijiquan	Taijijian	Total
1	Nicholas (INA)	9.53	9.29	18.82
2	Zhuang Jia Hong (HKG)	9.43	9.28	18.71
3	Tim Sastrowiardjo (NED)	9.23	9.40	18.63
4	Amir Darabi (IRI)	9.38	9.04	18.42
5	Otsu Asahi (JPN)	9.10	9.31	18.41
6	Seo Heeseong (KOR)	9.00	9.28	18.28
7	Reuben Woon (AUS)	8.45	8.94	17.39

==== Women's changquan ====
Rank	Athlete	Score
1	Loh Ying Ting (MAS)	9.56
2	Zoe Mui Wei Ting (SIN)	9.46
3	Liu Ting-ting (TPE)	9.35
4	Emily Fan (USA)	9.25
5	Hager Farahat (EGY)	9.22
6	Sou Cho Man (MAC)	9.20
7	Ganna Mandrik (UKR)	8.95
8	Elif Akyuz (TUR)	8.91
9	Jessica Lim (AUS)	8.10

==== Women's daoshu & gunshu combined ====
Rank	Athlete	Daoshu	Gunshu	Total
1	Amy Li (USA)	9.37	9.45	18.82
2	Zoe Mui Wei Ting (SIN)	9.24	9.50	18.74
3	Loh Ying Ting (MAS)	9.14	9.54	18.68
4	Nafiseh Poorganji (IRI)	9.22	9.19	18.41
5	Hager Farahat (EGY)	9.31	9.06	18.37
6	Valentina Ugolini (ITA)	8.89	9.41	18.30
7	Quynh Pham (VIE)	9.10	9.12	18.22
8	Jessica Lim (AUS)	8.53	8.79	17.32

==== Women's jianshu & qiangshu combined ====
Rank	Athlete	Jianshu	Qiangshu	Total
1	Wang Yipeng (CHN)	9.48	9.58	19.06
2	Elif Akyuz (TUR)	9.46	9.28	18.74
3	Emily Fan (USA)	9.30	9.42	18.72
4	Amy Yeung (CAN)	9.39	9.25	18.64
5	Liudmyla Temna (UKR)	9.26	9.30	18.56
6	Sato Mirii (JPN)	8.98	9.23	18.21

==== Women's nanquan & nandao combined ====
Rank	Athlete	Nanquan	Nangun	Total
1	Nhat Quynh Lam (VIE)	9.10	9.29	18.39
2	Aye Thit Sar Myint (MYA)	8.95	9.43	18.38
3	Anita Kar-Yan Chew (CAN)	9.27	9.00	18.27
4	Sherouk Ashraf Elmahdy (EGY)	8.91	9.01	17.92
5	Federica Gasparini (ITA)	8.75	8.87	17.62
6	Vanessa Liew (AUS)	8.89	8.12	17.01
7	Corry Aoun (LIB)	6.80	6.79	13.59

==== Women's taijiquan & taijijian combined ====
Rank	Athlete	Taijiquan	Taijijian	Total
1	Huang Xueqing (CHN)	9.57	9.58	19.15
2	Usui Kanon (JPN)	9.49	9.54	19.03
3	Chan Lu Yi (MAS)	9.40	9.52	18.92
4	Cynthia Cuaca (INA)	9.49	9.40	18.89
5	Vera Tan Yan Ning (SIN)	9.50	9.30	18.80
6	Hamideh Barkhor (IRI)	9.11	9.39	18.50
7	Kameliya Koleva (BUL)	6.87	6.90	13.77
8	Memecha Leimapopkam (IND)	6.70	6.72	13.42

=== Sanda ===
==== Men's 52 kg ====
Quarterfinals		Semifinals		Final
		Mahdi Mohammadi (IRI)	2
Moua Mouachangfu (FRA)	2	Moua Mouachangfu (FRA)	0
Ramil Vakhabov (KAZ)	1			Li Yage (CHN)	2
				Mahdi Mohammadi (IRI)	0
		Li Yage (CHN)	2
		Ilkin Valiyev (AZE)	0

==== Men's 60 kg ====
Quarterfinals
Sefer Budakli (TUR)	2
Oraznepes Geldiyev (TKM)	0
Shammadov Bayram (AZE)	2
Manuchar Kvashilava (GEO)	0
Paris Moran (USA)	2
Leung Ka Siu (HKG)	0

Semifinals
Guo Jiafeng (CHN)	2
Sefer Budakli (TUR)	0
Shammadov Bayram (AZE)	2
Paris Moran (USA)	0

Final
Guo Jiafeng (CHN)	2
Shammadov Bayram (AZE)	0

==== Men's 70 kg ====
Quarterfinals
Talgat Serikbay (KAZ)	2
Somokanta Ningombam (IND)	0
Moshen Shahbazi (IRI)	2
Islami Machalikashvili (GEO)	0
Han Chu (CHN)	2
Muhammet Gurbanov (TKM)	0

Semifinals
Talgat Serikbay (KAZ)	2
Yerkin Osmanov (AZE)	0
Han Chu (CHN)	2
Moshen Shahbazi (IRI)	0

Final
Han Chu (CHN)	2
Talgat Serikbay (KAZ)	0

==== Women's 52 kg ====
Quarterfinals
Chaoba Ningthoujam (IND)	2
Emily Blundell (AUS)	0
Khouloud Charfeddine (TUN)	2
Alina Valtseve (RUS)	0

Semifinals
Chaoba Ningthoujam (IND)	2
Merjen Saparova (TKM)	0
Cao Weiqing (CHN)	2
Khouloud Charfeddine (TUN)	0

Final
Cao Weiqing (CHN)	2
Chaoba Ningthoujam (IND)	0

==== Women's 60 kg ====
Quarterfinals
Thi Trang Nguyen (VIE)	2
Hager Mahmoud (EGY)	0
Saba Sharifi (IRI)	2
Bruna da Silva (BRA)	0

Semifinals
Thi Trang Nguyen (VIE)	2
Nihriban Aygir (TUR)	0
Saba Sharifi (IRI)	2
Daria Kozhokina (RUS)	0

Final
Thi Trang Nguyen (VIE)	2
Saba Sharifi (IRI)	0
