= 1989 Asian Wushu Championships =

2nd edition of the Asian Wushu Championships

- Location: British Hong Kong
- Start date: December 16, 1989
- End date: December 17, 1989
- Competitors: 120 from 14 nations

The 1989 Asian Wushu Championships was the 2nd edition of the Asian Wushu Championships. It was held on December 16 and 17, 1989 in British Hong Kong.

== Medal table ==
* Host nation (Hong Kong)

Rank	Nation	Gold	Silver	Bronze	Total
1	China (CHN)	14	1	0	15
2	Hong Kong	1	8	1	10
3	Japan (JPN)	1	3	0	4
4	Macau	0	0	1	1
Totals (4 entries)		16	12	2	30

== Medalists ==
=== All-around results ===
Event	Gold	Silver	Bronze
Men	Yuan Wenqing; China	Hai Choi Lam; Hong Kong	unknown
Women	Wang Ping; China	Ng Siu Ching; Hong Kong	unknown

=== Men ===
Event	Gold	Silver	Bronze
Changquan	Yuan Wenqing; China	Hai Choi Lam; Hong Kong	unknown
Daoshu	Yuan Wenqing; China	Hai Choi Lam; Hong Kong	unknown
Gunshu	Yuan Wenqing; China	Hai Choi Lam; Hong Kong	unknown
Jianshu	Ding Jie; China	unknown	unknown
Qiangshu	Ding Jie; China	unknown	unknown
Nanquan	Leung Yat Ho; Hong Kong	Lu Weitang; China	unknown
Taijiquan	Ding Jie; China	Arai Shinji; Japan	Lei Man Iam; Macau

=== Women ===
Event	Gold	Silver	Bronze
Changquan	Wang Ping; China	Ng Siu Ching; Hong Kong	unknown
Daoshu	Wang Ping; China	unknown	unknown
Gunshu	Wang Ping; China	Ng Siu Ching; Hong Kong	unknown
Jianshu	Shao Yingzhu; China	Ng Siu Ching; Hong Kong	unknown
Qiangshu	Shao Yingzhu; China	unknown	Li Fai; Hong Kong
Nanquan	Liang Yanhua; China	Noriko Katsube; Japan	unknown
Taijiquan	Morita Hisako; Japan	Naoko Masuda; Japan	unknown
