= Dao Yin Yang Sheng Gong =

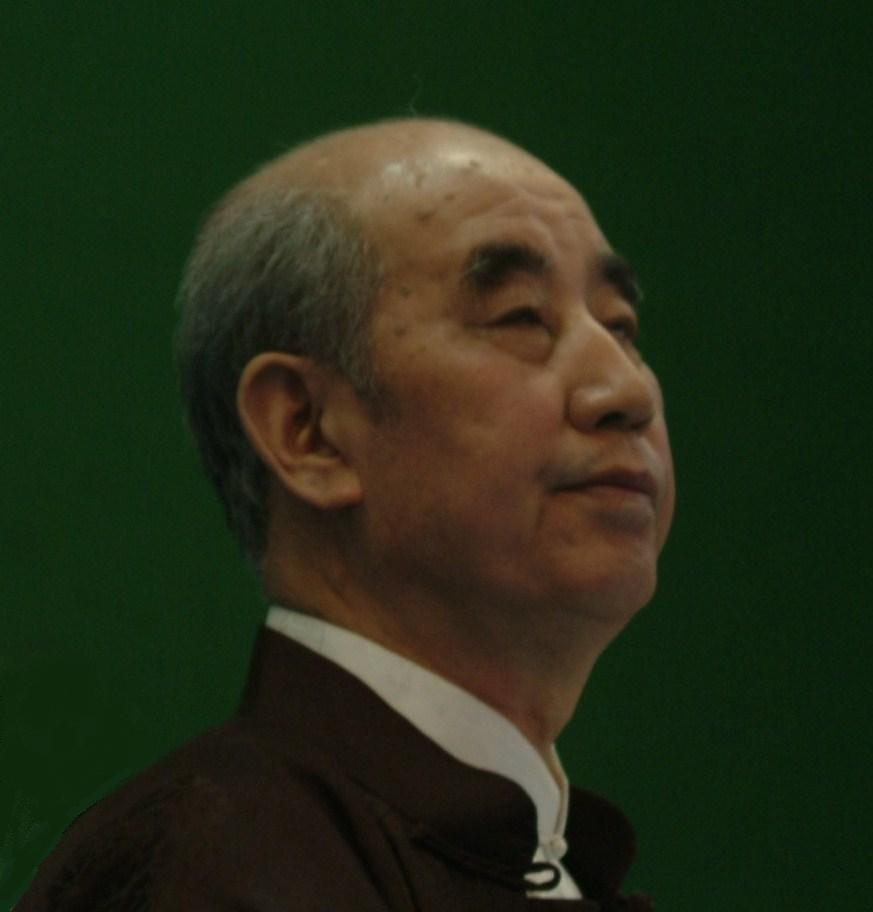
Professor Zhang Guangde, the originator of the Dao Yin Yang Sheng Gong

Dao Yin Yang Sheng Gong (Chinese: 导引养生功) is a form of Qigong system originated in China by Zhang Guangde, a Chinese martial artist and a former professor at the Beijing Sport University. It integrates physical movement with mental cultivation and controlled breathing.

== Reception ==
The system was recognized and integrated into China's education curriculum in sports and medical schools by the Ministry of Health of the People's Republic of China in 1990. The system has been adopted by hospitals for the treatment of diseases, and it's been practiced in other countries such as France and Portugal.
