= 1992 Asian Wushu Championships =

3rd edition of the Asian Wushu Championships

- Location: Seoul, South Korea
- Start date: June 7, 1992
- End date: June 12, 1992

The 1992 Asian Wushu Championships was the 3rd edition of the Asian Wushu Championships. It was held from June 7 to 12, 1992 in Seoul, South Korea. Sanda was held as an exhibition event for the first time at the Asian Wushu Championships.

== Medal table ==
* Host nation (Philippines)

Rank	Nation	Gold	Silver	Bronze	Total
1	China (CHN)	7	0	0	7
2	Hong Kong	1	5	2	8
3	Malaysia (MAS)	1	3	2	6
4	Japan (JPN)	0	5	3	8
Totals (4 entries)		9	13	7	29

== Medalists ==
=== All-around results ===
Event	Gold	Silver	Bronze
Men	unknown	Hideo Ninomiya; Japan	unknown
Women	Zhuang Hui; China	Li Fai; Hong Kong	Ng Siu Ching; Hong Kong

=== Men ===
Event	Gold	Silver	Bronze
Changquan	unknown	Hideo Ninomiya; Japan	unknown
Daoshu	unknown	Hideo Ninomiya; Japan	unknown
Gunshu	unknown	Hideo Ninomiya; Japan	unknown
Jianshu	unknown	Kubota Jun; Japan	unknown
Qiangshu	unknown	unknown	Kubota Jun; Japan
Nanquan	He Qiang; China	Leung Yat Ho; Hong Kong	unknown
Taijiquan	unknown	unknown	unknown

=== Women ===
Event	Gold	Silver	Bronze
Changquan	Zhuang Hui; China	Li Fai; Hong Kong	Yuri Kaminiwa; Japan
Daoshu	unknown	unknown	unknown
Gunshu	Li Fai; Hong Kong	unknown	unknown
Jianshu	Zhuang Hui; China	Li Fai; Hong Kong	unknown
Qiangshu	Zhuang Hui; China	Ng Siu Ching; Hong Kong	Yuri Kaminiwa; Japan
Nanquan	Chen Huimin; China	unknown	Ng Siu Ching; Hong Kong
Taijiquan	Gao Jiamin; China	unknown	unknown
