= International Invitational Wushu Championships =

- Genre: Global sports event
- Inaugurated: (1982) 1985
- Most recent: 1990
- Organiser: Chinese Wushu Association

The International Invitational Wushu Championships, also known as the International Wushu Festivals, were a series of international wushu competitions held from 1985 until the formation of the International Wushu Federation (IWUF) in 1990. These competitions were the first ever international wushu competitions, and preceded the World Wushu Championships which started in 1991.

== Championships ==
=== Taolu ===
Year	Edition	Location	Notes
1982	-	China	Also known at the International Wushu Festival
1984	-	Wuhan, China	Taijiquan only
1985	1	Xi'an, China	
1986	2	Tianjin, China	Also known as the Tianjin Daily Cup
1988	3	Hangzhou, China	
1989	-	Beijing, China	Also known at the International Wushu and Taijiquan Festival
1990	4	Kuala Lumpur, Malaysia	Also known at the Malaysia Wushu Festival

=== Sanda ===
Year	Edition	Location
1988	1	Shenzhen, China
1991	2	Beijing, China

== History ==
=== Background ===
In January 1982, the movie Shaolin Temple (1982) was released as the first film to feature modern wushu. Later that year, the General Administration of Sport of China officially proclaimed that wushu practitioners had a duty 'to promote wushu to the world' with the ultimate goal of wushu becoming an official event at the Olympic Games. In June, the Chinese Wushu Association (CWA) hosted a small-scale international wushu tournament. A year later in 1983, Beijing won the bid to host the 1990 Asian Games, the first international multi-sport event to occur in China, and wushu was added as a new sport.

=== 1985, Xi'an ===
The CWA officially hosted the 1st International Invitational Wushu Championships in Xi'an from August 22-25, 1985. 91 athletes from 14 nations competed. China finished in first place with a clean sweep of 14 gold medals, Japan finished in second with five silver and three bronze medals, Canada and Hong Kong finished in third with two silver medals, the United States was fourth with six bronze medals, and Singapore earned a silver medal. Zhao Changjun and Zhang Hongmei from China captured the male and female all-around titles respectively. At this competition, a preparatory committee was formed for the foundation of the International Wushu Federation (then abbreviated to the IWF) which was led by the CWA and joined by various individuals and organizations throughout the world.

==== All-around results ====
Event	Gold	Silver	Bronze
Men	Zhao Changjun; China	Hideo Ninomiya; Japan	Richard Vecchiolla; United States
Women	Zhang Hongmei; China	Atsuko Noguchi; Japan	Hisako Morita; Japan

=== 1986, Tianjin ===
The CWA hosted the second competition in Tianjin from November 2-4, 1986. More than 200 athletes from 24 countries participated. China won 16 out of 17 gold medals, while Great Britain's Nigel Sutton won the last gold medal in baguazhang. Zhao Changjun and Zhang Yuping from China captured the male and female all-around titles respectively. At this event, the preparatory committee for the Wushu Federation of Asia (WFA) was formed to host the first Asian Wushu Championships in 1987.

==== All-around results ====
Event	Gold	Silver	Bronze
Men	Zhao Changjun; China	Philip Wong; United States	Nick Gracenin; United States
Women	Zhang Yuping; China	Alice Chang; Canada	Gillian Barber; Great Britain

=== 1988, Hangzhou ===
The third championships were held in Hangzhou in 1988. 486 athletes from 32 countries participated. Japan, Hong Kong, Singapore, and the United Kingdom grabbed a gold medal each while China won the rest. After the taolu competition, the festival transitioned into the first International Invitational Sanshou Championships which relocated to Shenzhen. China won four out of the seven contested weight categories, while Mexico, Belgium, and the Philippines won a gold medal each.

==== All-around results ====
Event	Gold	Silver	Bronze
Men	Yuan Wenqing; China	Hai Choi Lam; Hong Kong	unknown
Women	unknown	unknown	unknown

=== Other competitions ===
China hosted the International Wushu and Taijiquan Festival in Beijing from August 12-15, 1989. 200 athletes from 16 nations participated.

The second Asian Wushu Championships was hosted by Hong Kong in 1989. At this competition, the IWUF was expected to be established with the first world championships in 1990. Due to delays, this was unable to be completed, and thus the CWA thus gave the Wushu Federation of Malaysia on short notice the authority to host an international competition in the middle of 1990. Later in 1990, the wushu competition at the 1990 Asian Games took place. On October 3, the last day of competition, the IWUF was officially formed. In November of the same year, the CWA hosted a second international sanshou competition.

In March 1991, the CWA hosted the second international sanshou tournament in Beijing. China won six golds, and Romania and Gabon earned a gold each. In October, the IWUF hosted the 1st World Wushu Championships.
