= Wushu at the 1990 Asian Games – Men's changquan combined =

Men's changquan combined at the 1990 Asian Games
- Venue: Haidian Gymnasium
- Dates: 29 September – 4 October 1990

Medalists
gold medal	Yuan Wenqing	China
silver medal	Liu Zhenling	China
bronze medal	Hai Choi Lam	Hong Kong

The men's changquan three events combined competition (changquan, short weapon, long weapon) at the 1990 Asian Games in Beijing, China was held from 29 September to 4 October at the Haidian Gymnasium.

== Results ==
* The results are incomplete.

Rank	Athlete	Daoshu or Jianshu	Gunshu or Qiangshu	Changquan	Total
1st place, gold medalist(s)	Yuan Wenqing (CHN)	9.81	9.83	9.88	29.52
2nd place, silver medalist(s)	Liu Zhenling (CHN)	9.81	9.80	9.80	29.41
3rd place, bronze medalist(s)	Hai Choi Lam (HKG)	9.46	9.48	9.46	28.40
4	Kazunari Hirota (JPN)	9.48	9.46	9.43	28.37
5	Manabu Hayashi (JPN)	9.36	9.31	9.36	28.03
6	Hideo Ninomiya (JPN)	9.36	9.26	9.38	28.00
9	Choy Yee Onn (MAS)			9.21	27.54
10	Chan Chee Kheong (MAS)				27.46
	Lee Jung-kam (KOR)			9.18	
	Ram Gopal Maharjan (NEP)			9.11	
