= Iron Monkey 2 =

1996 Hong Kong film by Chao Lu-jiang

- DVD cover art
- Traditional Chinese: 街頭殺手
- Simplified Chinese: 街头杀手
- Hanyu Pinyin: Jiē Tóu Shā Shǒu
- Jyutping: Gaai1 Tau4 Saat3 Sau2
- Directed by: Chao Lu-jiang
- Written by: Lee Min-choi
- Produced by: Lan Tien-hong; Lee Shin
- Starring: Donnie Yen; Billy Chow; Wu Ma; Yuan Wenqing
- Cinematography: Tong Yu-tai
- Edited by: Wong Yuk-cheung
- Music by: Wong Kin-yuen; Brad Fiedel (stock music from True Lies); Jay Chattaway (stock music from Braddock: Missing in Action III)
- Production companies: Golden Sun Film; Gold Rush Film
- Distributed by: Miramax (US)
- Release date: 27 April 1996
- Running time: 92 minutes
- Country: Hong Kong
- Languages: Cantonese; Mandarin
- Box office: US$14,569,178 (United States)

Iron Monkey 2 is a 1996 Hong Kong martial arts film directed by Chao Lu-jiang and featuring action choreography by Yuen Woo-ping. This film starred Donnie Yen as "Iron Monkey", a role played by Yu Rongguang in the 1993 film Iron Monkey, which also starred Yen, but in a different role. The story in Iron Monkey 2 is not related to that of Iron Monkey.

== Plot ==
The film is set in early 20th-century China. A triad boss known as "Jade Faced Tiger" collaborates with foreigners to take over a town and exploit the residents. That night, while Tiger is watching a Chinese opera performance, the actors on stage suddenly attack him. The lead actor is "Iron Monkey", a masked fighter who helps the poor and punishes the wicked. Tiger narrowly survives the attack when his henchmen show up and drive away Iron Monkey.

Jin, a young peasant from the countryside, travels to the town in search of his father. He meets a pair of orphans, Xiaochun and Xiaoqian, who make a living by conning others. After seeing that he is very good in martial arts, they lie to him that they will help him find his father if he impersonates Iron Monkey. The naive Jin agrees and accepts a deal offered by a rich girl to help her avenge her father, who was murdered by Tiger. Jin's father is actually the blind old man who sings and plays songs on an erhu in town.

The following night, Iron Monkey robs a truck full of firearms purchased by Tiger. However, Jin, Xiaochun and Xiaoqian show up, and Jin declares that he is Iron Monkey. While Jin and the real Iron Monkey are fighting with each other, Xiaochun and Xiaoqian escape with the firearms. The fight between Jin and Iron Monkey is interrupted by Tiger's men. They manage to escape but Jin's father, who happens to be nearby, is captured by Tiger's men.

Xiaochun and Xiaoqian visit Tiger and sell him the firearms they have stolen. In return, Tiger employs them to work at his nightclub, but they leave the nightclub later after an unhappy incident. In the meantime, Iron Monkey pretends to be another triad boss and demands that Tiger releases Jin's father. Tiger does not know Iron Monkey's true identity, falls for the ruse, and almost allows Jin's father to leave with him. Just then, one of Tiger's henchmen who had survived the attack on the truck returns to his boss. He recognises Iron Monkey and identifies him as the attacker. A fight breaks out. Jin's father is shot and killed while Iron Monkey escapes.

Iron Monkey reveals his true identity to Jin and tells him about what happened to his father. Meanwhile, Tiger gets his brother, Bear, a formidable fighter, to help him deal with Iron Monkey. One night, Jin, Xiaochun and Xiaoqian go to Tiger's hideout to steal the firearms but are discovered by Tiger's men. Iron Monkey shows up and helps them fend off the thugs, but Xiaoqian is mortally wounded and she dies in Xiaochun's arms later.

Jin and Xiaochun disguise themselves as painters and sneak inside Tiger's nightclub, where they start a fight. Jin is cornered by Tiger and Bear when Iron Monkey appears and helps him deal with Bear. Iron Monkey kills Bear and joins Jin in fighting Tiger. Tiger is eventually trapped in a net and burnt to death by Xiaochun. The movie ends as Iron Monkey, Jin and Xiaochun walk away.

== Cast ==
- Donnie Yen as Iron Monkey
- Billy Chow as Bear
- Wu Ma as Jin's father
- Yuan Wenqing as Jin
- Cheung Kin-li as Jade Faced Tiger
- Li Wing
- Han Wan-chong
- Lee Hoi-hing
- Lau Wang
- Ho Chow-yung

== See also ==
- Donnie Yen filmography
