= African Wushu Championships =

International sports championship

African Wushu Championships is an international sports championship hosted by the African Wushu Kung Fu Federation (AFWF) for the sports of wushu taolu and sanda (sanshou).

== Championships ==
Year	Edition	Location	
	1		
	2		
	3		
	4		
2013	5	Antananarivo, Madagascar	5 to 8 September 2013
2017	6	Cotonou, Benin	19 to 23 July 2017
2019	7	Dakar, Senegal	5 to 10 September 2019
2023	8	Abidjan, Ivory Coast	20 to 25 July 2023
2025	9	Caire, Égypte	1 to 6 May 2025
