= Sanda World Cup =

International wushu competition

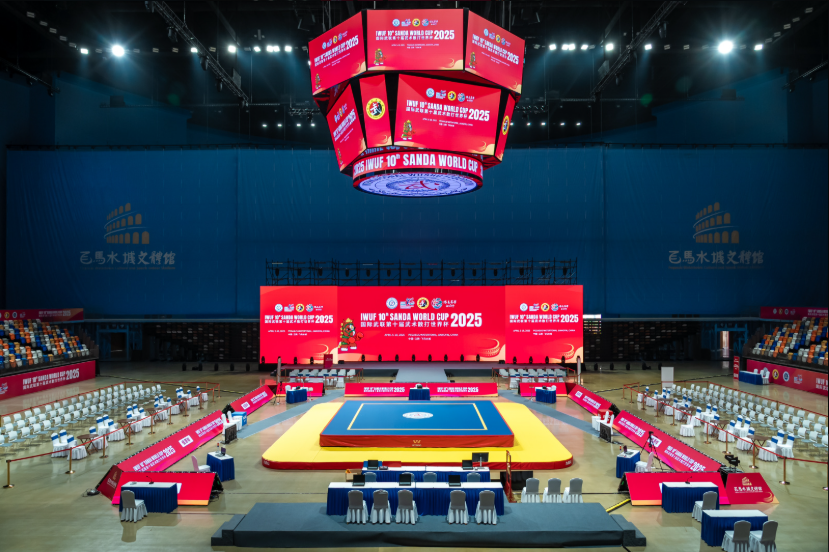
- Sanda World cup 2025
- Genre: Global sports event
- Frequency: Biennial
- Inaugurated: 2002
- Most recent: 2025
- Organiser: IWUF
- Website: Official website

Sanda World Cup
- Simplified Chinese: 武术散打世界杯
- Traditional Chinese: 武術散打世界盃
- Hanyu Pinyin: Wǔshù Sǎndǎ Shìjièbēi

The Sanda World Cup, previously known as the Sanshou Wushu Cup, is an elite-level international sports championship hosted by the International Wushu Federation (IWUF) for the sport of Sanda. Athletes qualify by placing high at the prior World Wushu Championships.

== Events ==
Year	Edition	Location
2002	1	Shanghai, China
2004	2	Guangzhou, Guangdong, China
2006	3	Xi'an, Shaanxi, China
2008	4	Harbin, Heilongjiang, China
2010	5	Chongqing, China
2012	6	Wuyishan, Fujian, China
2014	7	Jakarta, Indonesia
2016	8	Xi'an, Shaanxi, China
2018	9	Hangzhou, Zhejiang, China
2025	10	Jiangyin, China

== Competition events ==
Men’s Events 48kg, 52kg, 56kg, 60kg, 65kg, 70kg, 75kg, 80kg, 85kg, 90kg, 90kg+.

Women’s Events 48kg, 52kg, 56kg, 60kg, 65kg, 70kg, 75kg.

== Qualifications ==
The top 3 placed athletes (3rd place juxtaposed) from the latest World Wushu Championships.

Or

Two seats by top ranking order from the latest International Wushu Invitational Tournament.

== Medal table from (last world cup) ==
=== Men's sanda ===
Event	Gold	Silver	Bronze
48 kg	Jiahao LI; China	Kushal KUMAR; India	Tharwt AL-SENDI; Yemen
48 kg	Jiahao LI; China	Kushal KUMAR; India	none awarded [[|]]
52 kg	Magomed Gasanov; Russia	Anuj ANUJ; India	none awarded [[|]]
52 kg	Magomed Gasanov; Russia	Anuj ANUJ; India	none awarded [[|]]
56 kg	Carlos Jr. BAYLON; Philippines	Saydullo ABDURASHITOV; Uzbekistan	Hio Lam KU; Macau
56 kg	Carlos Jr. BAYLON; Philippines	Saydullo ABDURASHITOV; Uzbekistan	Islam Karimov; Kazakhstan
60 kg	Yu Hong Leung; Hong Kong	Manh Cuong Nguyen; Vietnam	Elchin Eminov; Azerbaijan
60 kg	Yu Hong Leung; Hong Kong	Manh Cuong Nguyen; Vietnam	Xander ALIPIO; Philippines
65 kg	Guo Wei; China	Ravi PANCHAL; India	Clemente Tabugara Jr. Philippines
65 kg	Guo Wei; China	Ravi PANCHAL; India	Bexultan Koskenov; Kazakhstan
70 kg	Dat Huynh Do; Vietnam	Yat Lam CHEUNG; Hong Kong	Manuel di Carlo; Italy
70 kg	Dat Huynh Do; Vietnam	Yat Lam CHEUNG; Hong Kong	Huan YI ZHANG; Chinese Taipei
75 kg	Mukesh CHOUDHARY; India	Michele Balducci; Italy	Yoan Benbedra; France
75 kg	Mukesh CHOUDHARY; India	Michele Balducci; Italy	none awarded [[|]]
80 kg	Mingjie GAO; China	Kevin Alan Galladro Onofre; Mexico	Fabio Gjorni; Italy
80 kg	Mingjie GAO; China	Kevin Alan Galladro Onofre; Mexico	none awarded [[|]]
85 kg	Michael Nicolas Woodward; Australia	Rajat CHARAK; India	none awarded [[|]]
85 kg	Michael Nicolas Woodward; Australia	Rajat CHARAK; India	none awarded [[|]]
90 kg	Seyedmoein TAGHAVI; Iran	Saidiakram RAIMOV; Kazakhstan	none awarded [[|]]
90 kg	Seyedmoein TAGHAVI; Iran	Saidiakram RAIMOV; Kazakhstan	none awarded [[|]]
90 kg+	Xiang Ye; China	Nursultan Tursynkulov; Kazakhstan	Jiahao CAI; Hong Kong
90 kg+	Xiang Ye; China	Nursultan Tursynkulov; Kazakhstan	none awarded [[|]]

=== Women's sanda ===
Event	Gold	Silver	Bronze
48 kg	Nguyen Thi Lan; Vietnam	Chhavi Chhavi; India	Claudia ESTEVES PIRES; Portugal
48 kg	Nguyen Thi Lan; Vietnam	Chhavi Chhavi; India	Gaia LAGONA; Italy
52 kg	Chen Mengyue; China	Ngo Thi Phuong Nga; Vietnam	Elisa Calanducci; Italy
52 kg	Chen Mengyue; China	Ngo Thi Phuong Nga; Vietnam	Edinea PRADO CAMARGO; Brazil
56 kg	Liu Danfeng; China	Beatriz Adriao Rustice Silva; Brazil	Tsz Ching CHAN; Hong Kong
56 kg	Liu Danfeng; China	Beatriz Adriao Rustice Silva; Brazil	none awarded
60 kg	Thi Thu Thuy NGUYEN; Vietnam	Soheila MANSOURIAN SEMIROMI; Iran	Salome Yael Schumacher; Switzerland
60 kg	Thi Thu Thuy NGUYEN; Vietnam	Soheila MANSOURIAN SEMIROMI; Iran	Sabrina Marina Detoma; Argentina
65 kg	Sedigheh DARIAEIVARKADEH; Iran	Krista Stepheny Dyer; Bermuda	Nicole Lowe-Tarbert; Australia
65 kg	Sedigheh DARIAEIVARKADEH; Iran	Krista Stepheny Dyer; Bermuda	none awarded
70 kg	Zhu Hailan; China	Govher Govshudova; Turkmenistan	Maya Bejaqui; Tunisia
70 kg	Zhu Hailan; China	Govher Govshudova; Turkmenistan	none awarded
75 kg	Shahrbanoo Mansourian; Iran	Rimel Khalifi; Tunisia	none awarded [[|]]
75 kg	Shahrbanoo Mansourian; Iran	Rimel Khalifi; Tunisia	none awarded [[|]]
