= 1987 Asian Wushu Championships =

1st Edition of the Asian Wushu Championships

- Venue: Yokohama Cultural Gymnasium (capacity: 8,000)
- Location: Yokohama, Japan
- Start date: September 26, 2024
- End date: September 27, 2024
- Competitors: 90 from 12 nations

The 1987 Asian Wushu Championships was the first edition of the Asian Wushu Championships. It was held in the Yokohama Cultural Gymnasium in Yokohama, Japan, from September 26 to 27, 1987. The Wushu Federation of Asia (WFA) was founded at this competition, and a bid was drafted for wushu's successful inclusion at the 1990 Asian Games.

== Medal table ==
* Host nation (Japan)

Rank	NOC	Gold	Silver	Bronze	Total
1	China	13	3	0	16
2	Hong Kong	1	9	4	14
3	Japan*	1	3	8	12
4	Singapore	1	1	2	4
Totals (4 entries)		16	16	14	46

== Medalists ==
=== All-around results ===
Event	Gold	Silver	Bronze
Men	Zhao Changjun; China	Wong Yeung Hoi; Hong Kong	Hai Choi Lam; Hong Kong
Women	Zhang Yuping; China	Ng Siu Ching; Hong Kong	Maehigasi Atsuko; Japan

=== Men ===
Event	Gold	Silver	Bronze
Changquan	Zhao Changjun; China	Wong Yeung Hoi; Hong Kong	Hai Choi Lam; Hong Kong
Daoshu	Zhao Changjun; China	Hai Choi Lam; Hong Kong	Hayashi Manabu; Japan
Gunshu	Zhao Changjun; China	Wong Yeung Hoi; Hong Kong	Mak Tak Low; Hong Kong
Jianshu	Jia Ping; China	Wong Yeung Hoi; Hong Kong	Hirota Kazunari; Japan
Qiangshu	Zhang Chengjun; China	Ng Cheng Chua; Singapore	Hirota Kazunari; Japan
Nanquan	Too Siu Chun; Hong Kong	Chen Weicai; China	Lin Dicai; Singapore
Taijiquan	Dong Jie; China	Arai Shinji; Japan	Kimura Toyohiko; Japan

=== Women ===
Event	Gold	Silver	Bronze
Changquan	Zhang Yuping; China	Ng Siu Ching; Hong Kong	Maehigasi Atsuko; Japan
Daoshu	Zhang Yuping; China	Maehigasi Atsuko; Japan	Too Yuet Ping; Hong Kong
Gunshu	Zhang Yuping; China	Ng Siu Ching; Hong Kong	Maehigasi Atsuko; Japan
Jianshu	Li Xia; China	Ng Siu Ching; Hong Kong	none awarded
Qiangshu	Feng Qiuying; China	Fujii Hisako; Japan	Seah Gek Choi; Singapore
Nanquan	Tan Ai Lan; Singapore	Chen Huimin; China	none awarded
Taijiquan	Morita Hisako; Japan	Dong Pei; China	Nogochi Atauko; Japan
