= Shanghai University of Sport =

Public university in Shanghai, China

- 上海体育大学
- Motto in English: Integration of Mind and Body, Inclusive and Competitive
- Type: Public
- Established: 1952; 74 years ago
- Location: Shanghai, China
- Campus: urban
- Website: www.sus.edu.cn

Chinese name
- Simplified Chinese: 上海体育大学
- Traditional Chinese: 上海體育大學
Transcriptions
Standard Mandarin
- Hanyu Pinyin: Shànghǎi Tǐyù Dàxué

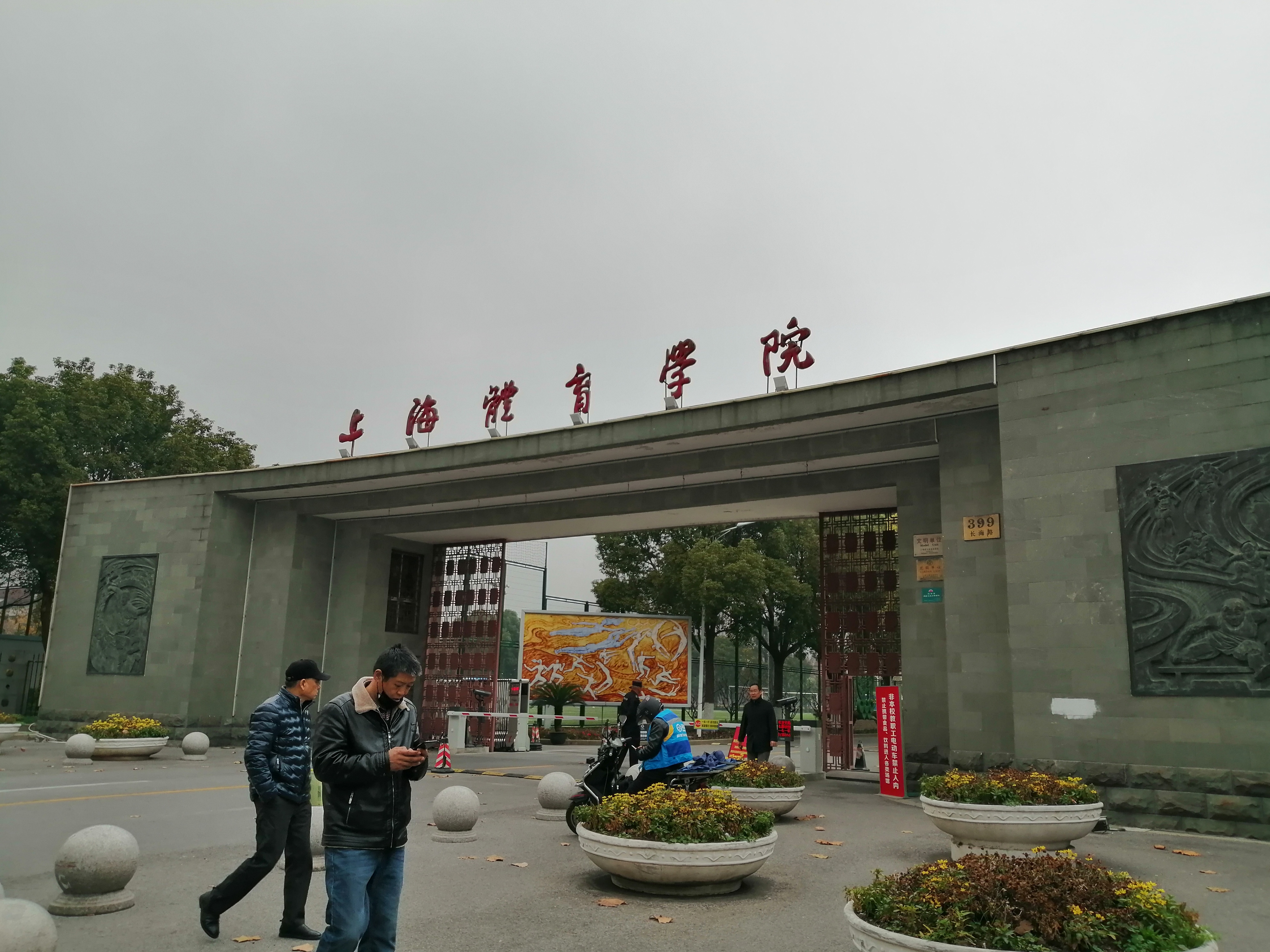
Shanghai University of Sport

The Shanghai University of Sport (SUS) is a municipal public university in Yangpu, Shanghai, China. It is affiliated with the City of Shanghai. The university is part of the Double First-Class Construction.

The school was founded in 1952.

== History ==
SUS was established in November 1952 by the merger of departments of Physical Education from East China Normal University, Nanjing University and Ginling College. Wu Yunrui, the first president of SUS, devoted himself to the advanced values and notions of physical education.

SUS was formerly under the direct governance of the General Administration of Sport of China and began to be jointly constructed and managed in 2001 by the General Administration of Sport of China and Shanghai Municipal Government.

== Rankings and reputation ==
Shanghai University of Sport consistently ranks the best in China among universities specialized in sport in the recognized Best Chinese Universities Ranking.

As of 2025, Shanghai University of Sport ranks #1 in Asia and #23 in the world according to "Global Ranking of Sport Science Schools and Departments" released by Shanghai Ranking.

== Academics ==
In over 60 years of construction and development, SUS has grown into a multi-disciplined university with six categories of education: management, science, literature, medicine and arts featured with sport science. SUS has established a complete education system covering bachelor, master and doctoral programs and set up a mobile station for post-doctoral research in sport science.

SUS has more than 4000 full-time undergraduate students on campus, 1000 postgraduate students, 1400 overseas students, 1400 adult students, and more than 700 teaching and administration staff, among whom 82 are professors and 170 associate professors.
