= 1991 World Wushu Championships =

1st edition of the World Wushu Championships

- Venue: Capital Indoor Stadium (capacity: 18,000)
- Location: Beijing, China
- Start date: October 12, 1991
- End date: October 16, 1991
- Competitors: 281 from 38 nations

The 1991 World Wushu Championships was the 1st edition of the World Wushu Championships. It was held in Beijing, China from October 12 to 16, 1991. This was the first international competition organized by the International Wushu Federation.

== Medal table ==
* Host nation (China)

Rank	NOC	Gold	Silver	Bronze	Total
1	China*	14	1	0	15
2	Japan	2	5	3	10
3	Soviet Union	2	0	0	2
4	Hong Kong	1	4	2	7
5	Chinese Taipei	1	2	2	5
6	Spain	1	2	0	3
7	Philippines	1	1	3	5
8	Brazil	1	1	0	2
9	Romania	0	2	0	2
9	Singapore	0	2	0	2
11	United States	0	1	2	3
12	Macau	0	1	0	1
12	Sweden	0	1	0	1
14	Malaysia	0	0	4	4
15	France	0	0	2	2
15	Great Britain	0	0	2	2
17	Italy	0	0	1	1
Totals (17 entries)		23	23	21	67

== Medalists ==
=== All-around results ===
Event	Gold	Silver	Bronze
Men	Gao Huanbo; China	Hideo Ninomiya; Japan	Phoon Chee Kong; Malaysia
Women	Zhang Shaoyi; China	Ng Siu Ching; Hong Kong	Li Fai; Hong Kong

=== Men's taolu ===
Event	Gold	Silver	Bronze
Changquan	Gao Huanbo; China	Hideo Ninomiya; Japan	Choy Yeen Onn; Malaysia
Daoshu	Gao Huanbo; China	Hideo Ninomiya; Japan	Phoon Chee Kong; Malaysia
Gunshu	Gao Huanbo; China	Bobby Hong; Philippines	Hideo Ninomiya; Japan
Jianshu	Kazunari Hirota; Japan	Andrew Hartono; United States	Samson Co; Philippines
Qiangshu	Samson Co; Philippines	Kazunari Hirota; Japan	Phoon Chee Kong; Malaysia
Nanquan	Leung Yat Ho; Hong Kong	Huang Shaoxiong; China	Joseph Wu; Philippines
Taijiquan	Ryoji Ito; Japan	Lei Man Iam; Macau	David Ross; United States

=== Women's taolu ===
Event	Gold	Silver	Bronze
Changquan	Zhang Shaoyi; China	Ng Siu Ching; Hong Kong	Li Fai; Hong Kong
Daoshu	Geng Zhenhui; China	Ko Tuan-fang; Chinese Taipei	Noriko Katsube; Japan
Gunshu	Geng Zhenhui; China	Li Fai; Hong Kong	Jennifer Yeo; Philippines
Jianshu	Zhang Shaoyi; China	Ng Siu Ching; Hong Kong	Li Fai; Hong Kong
Qiangshu	Zhang Shaoyi; China	Ng Siu Ching; Hong Kong	Yuri Kaminiwa; Japan
Nanquan	Liang Yanhua; China	Noriko Katsube; Japan	Ng Kwai Yin; Malaysia
Taijiquan	Gao Jiamin; China	Naoko Masuda; Japan	Huang Ti-na; Chinese Taipei

=== Men's sanda ===
Event	Gold	Silver	Bronze
52 kg	Wang Shiying; China	Heng Choy; Singapore	Pan Chien-tsun; Chinese Taipei
56 kg	Zeng Qingfeng; China	Heng Wen Wei; Singapore	None awarded
60 kg	Wang Jianming; China	Hsu Jun-tsai; Chinese Taipei	Roberto Boschi; Italy
65 kg	Yang Rui; China	Jon Nyberg; Sweden	Alan Gordon; Great Britain
70 kg	Pan Hsiung-chi; Chinese Taipei	Ángel Amieva; Spain	Jason Yee; United States
75 kg	Ramazanov Ramazan; Soviet Union	Lorenzo Pavón; Spain	Micah Hudson; Great Britain
80 kg	Xavi Moya; Spain	Luiz Carlos Pessanha; Brazil	Christophe Grandjean; France
85 kg	James Ayres; Brazil	Marcel Tabara; Romania	Jean-Claude Anicet; France
90 kg	Kazbek Zhaparov; Soviet Union	Petru Grindeanu; Romania	None awarded
