= Chinese Wushu Association =

Governing body of wushu in China

- 中国武术协会
- Abbreviation: CWA
- Nickname: Wushu Administrative Center of the General Administration of Sport of China
- Formation: September 1958
- Founder: Li Menghua
- Purpose: Promotion and management of wushu throughout China.
- Headquarters: Beijing, China
- Affiliations: IWUF
- Website: http://www.wushu.com.cn/#/

The Chinese Wushu Association (CWA) is the governing body of wushu in all of its forms throughout China. Since its founding in 1958, it has been credited with the development and standardization of modern wushu and sanda throughout the world.

== History ==
The Central Guoshu Institute was created in 1928 by the Kuomintang as a means of standardizing the practice of wushu throughout China. It closed in 1948 due to a lack of funding. In 1958 under the Chinese Communist Party, the Chinese Wushu Association was founded in Beijing. The first chairman was Li Menghua. That year, the first National Games of China were held where wushu was an official event.

In the mid to late 1980s, the CWA organized a series of competitions known as the International Invitational Wushu Championships which included 1985, 1986, and 1988 renditions for taolu competition, as well as a sanda competition in 1988. At the 1985 competition held in Xi'an, a preparatory committee for the formation of the International Wushu Federation was formed by the CWA which included other international promoters and practitioners. Since the formation of the IWUF, the CWA continued to be a major influence on the progression of wushu worldwide in the creation of competition regulations, routines, and standards.

In 2020, amid criticism of traditional martial arts, the CWA ordered practitioners not to self-appoint themselves as masters.

== Organization ==
The CWA is the official national wushu federation of China which is recognized by the International Wushu Federation. It is also part of the Wushu Federation of Asia (WFA), a continental organization of the IWUF. The CWA is a part of the General Administration of Sport of China, All-China Sports Federation, and the Chinese Olympic Committee. The CWA consists of various technical committees for various styles of wushu as well as other committees dedicated to promotion, management, and research. The current chairman is Zhang Qiuping who is also the IWUF Secretary General.

=== List of Chairmen ===
- Li Menghua, 1958
- Dong Shouyi, 1964
- Zheng Huaixian, 1980
- Huang Zhong, 1982
- Zhang Yaoting, 1992
- Li Jie, 1996
- Wang Xiaolin, 2005
- Gao Xiaojun, 2010
- Zhang Qiuping, 2014

== See also ==
- China national wushu team
