= Wushu at the World Games =

Wushu has been contested at the World Games as an invitational sport in 2009 and 2013 with taolu and sanda events. In the 2022 World Games, wushu returned as an invitational sport but only with taolu events.

== Editions ==
Edition	Year	Host city	Best nation
8	2009	Kaohsiung, Chinese Taipei	China
9	2013	Cali, Colombia	China
11	2022	Birmingham, United States	China
12	2025	Chengdu, China	China

== Medal table ==
As of 2022 Games.

Rank	Nation	Gold	Silver	Bronze	Total
1	China (CHN)	17	1	1	19
2	Iran (IRI)	6	1	1	8
3	United States (USA)	3	0	1	4
4	Vietnam (VIE)	2	4	2	8
5	Russia (RUS)	2	4	1	7
6	Indonesia (INA)	2	2	1	5
7	Chinese Taipei (TPE)	1	4	2	7
8	Hong Kong (HKG)	1	2	4	7
9	France (FRA)	1	2	1	4
10	South Korea (KOR)	1	1	2	4
11	Brunei (BRU)	1	1	0	2
12	Malaysia (MAS)	0	2	4	6
13	Japan (JPN)	0	2	2	4
14	Canada (CAN)	0	2	1	3
15	Ukraine (UKR)	0	1	2	3
16	Brazil (BRA)	0	1	1	2
16	Singapore (SIN)	0	1	1	2
16	Turkey (TUR)	0	1	1	2
19	Chile (CHI)	0	1	0	1
19	India (IND)	0	1	0	1
19	Italy (ITA)	0	1	0	1
19	Philippines (PHI)	0	1	0	1
19	Uzbekistan (UZB)	0	1	0	1
24	Argentina (ARG)	0	0	1	1
24	Mexico (MEX)	0	0	1	1
Totals (25 entries)		37	37	30	104

== See also ==
- Wushu at the 2024 World Games Series
