= Asian Wushu Championships =

Continental sports championship

- Genre: Continental event
- Frequency: Quadrennial
- Inaugurated: 1987
- Most recent: 2024
- Organiser: WFA
- Website: Official website

Asian Wushu Championships
- Simplified Chinese: 亚洲武术锦标赛
- Traditional Chinese: 亞洲武術錦標賽
- Hanyu Pinyin: Yàzhōu wǔshù jǐnbiāosài

The Asian Wushu Championships is a continental wushu championship hosted by the Wushu Federation of Asia (WFA), the official continental representative to the International Wushu Federation. The competition is open to the 37 member nations of the WFA and their respective national teams. Unlike other continental wushu competitions which are held every two years, the Asian Wushu Championships is held every four years to make way for wushu at the Asian Games.

The WFA also hosts the Asian Junior Wushu Championships, Asian Kungfu Championships, and the Asian Sanda Cup.

== History ==
In 1985, the preparatory committee for the creation of the IWUF was created at the 1st International Invitational Wushu Championships. In 1987, a preparatory committee was created for the formation of the Wushu Federation of Asia, which was largely guided by the Chinese Wushu Association. Later that year, ten, and later twelve nations applied for participation in the first Asian Wushu Championships in Yokohama, Japan. Over 90 competitors competed in the 16 events of the first championships.

== Championships ==
=== Asian Wushu Championships ===
Edition	Year	Host city, region / country
1	1987	Yokohama, Japan
2	1989	British Hong Kong
3	1992	Seoul, South Korea
4	1996	Manila, Philippines
5	2000	Hanoi, Vietnam
6	2004	Yangon, Myanmar
7	2008	Macau, China
8	2012	Ho Chi Minh City, Vietnam
9	2016	Taoyuan, Taiwan
10	2024	Macau, China

=== Asian Junior Wushu Championships ===
Edition	Year	Host city, region / country	Results
1	2001	Hanoi, Vietnam	
2	2003	Beijing, China	
3	2005	Singapore	
4	2007	Yeongju, South Korea	
5	2009	Macau, China	
6	2011	Shanghai, China	
7	2013	Manila, Philippines	
8	2015	Xilinhot, China	
9	2017	Gumi, South Korea	
10	2019	Bandar Seri Begawan, Brunei	
11	2023	Macau, China	
12	2025	Jiangyin, China	

=== Asian Kungfu Championships ===
Edition	Year	Host city, region / country
1	2018	Nanjing, China
2	2021	Malaysia (online)

=== Asian Taolu Cup ===
Edition	Year	Host city, region / country
1	2025	Changchun, China

=== Asian Sanda Cup ===
Edition	Year	Host city, region / country
1	2017	Foshan, China
2	2025	Jilin, China

== Statistics ==
=== Multiple gold medalists ===
Rank	Athlete	Country	From	To	Gold	Silver	Bronze	Total
1	Zhao Changjun	China	1987	1987	4	0	0	4
1	Zhang Yuping	China	1987	1987	4	0	0	4
1	Yuan Wenqing	China	1989	1989	4	0	0	4
1	Wang Ping	China	1989	1989	4	0	0	4
1	Zhuang Hui	China	1992	1992	4	0	0	4
1	Sun Chunhe	China	2000	2000	4	0	0	4
1	Wang Xiaona	China	2000	2000	4	0	0	4

== See also ==
- World Junior Wushu Championships
- List of international wushu competitions
- World Wushu Championships
- Wushu at the Asian Games
