= World Wushu Championships =

International sports championship

- Pictogram for Wushu
- Genre: Global event
- Frequency: Biennial
- Inaugurated: 1991
- Most recent: 2025
- Organiser: IWUF
- Website: Official website

The World Wushu Championships (WWC) is an international sports championship hosted by the International Wushu Federation (IWUF) for the sports of wushu taolu and sanda (sanshou). The tournament has been held biennially since 1991 and is the pinnacle event of the IWUF. The World Wushu Championships also coincides with the IWUF Congress and various committee meetings. This competition additionally serves as the qualification event for the Taolu World Cup and the Sanda World Cup.

== Editions ==
Year	Edition	Location	Events	First of the medal table	Second of the medal table	Third of the medal table
1991	1	Beijing, China	23	China	Japan	Soviet Union
1993	2	Kuala Lumpur, Malaysia	24	China	Russia	Hong Kong
1995	3	Baltimore, United States	24	China	Hong Kong	Russia
1997	4	Rome, Italy	25	China	Hong Kong	Russia
1999	5	Hong Kong	31	China	Hong Kong	Vietnam
2001	6	Yerevan, Armenia	41	China	Vietnam	South Korea
2003	7	Macau	39	China	Vietnam	Russia
2005	8	Hanoi, Vietnam	40	China	Vietnam	Malaysia
2007	9	Beijing, China	40	China	Macau	Vietnam
2009	10	Toronto, Canada	40	China	Iran	Hong Kong
2011	11	Ankara, Turkey	40	China	Iran	Hong Kong
2013	12	Kuala Lumpur, Malaysia	46	China	Iran	Malaysia
2015	13	Jakarta, Indonesia	50	China	Indonesia	Iran
2017	14	Kazan, Russia	44	China	Iran	Hong Kong
2019	15	Shanghai, China	44	China	Iran	Hong Kong
2023	16	Fort Worth, United States	40	China	Vietnam	Macau
2025	17	Brasília, Brazil	41	China	Iran	Malaysia
2027	18	Pasay, Philippines	TBD	Future event		
2029	19	Macau	TBD	Future event		

== History ==
World Wushu Championships
- Simplified Chinese: 世界武术锦标赛
- Traditional Chinese: 世界武術錦標賽
- Hanyu Pinyin: Shìjiè Wǔshù Jǐnbiāosài

Starting in 1985, the Chinese Wushu Association began to host the International Invitational Wushu Championships as a ways of standardizing the sport of wushu on a global scale. After the formation of the IWUF at the 1990 Asian Games in Beijing, the 1991 World Wushu Championships were quickly organized to be held in the same city. With the desire of reaching a wider global audience and to achieve recognition by the International Olympic Committee, the 3rd and 4th world championships were organized in the United States and Italy, respectively, the first major international wushu competitions outside of Asia. At the 6th WWC in 2001, the competition administered doping tests for the first time. In 2007, the 9th WWC served as the qualification of the 2008 Beijing Wushu Tournament. The same competition along with the 12th and 15th WWCs served as qualification for Wushu at the World Games.The 16th WWC was rescheduled from 2021 to 2023 as a result of the COVID-19 pandemic.

=== Addition of events ===
The 1st WWC consisted of changquan, daoshu, jianshu, gunshu, qiangshu, nanquan, taijiquan, and men's sanda (originally called sanshou). Starting in 1993 with the 2nd WWC, the IWUF compulsory routines were to be used in taolu competition. In 1999, taijijian, nandao, and nangun were added. That same year, the second set of compulsory routines were approved, and thus in the 6th WWC in 2001, the old and new compulsory routine events were held simultaneously. During the next rendition in 2003, duilian and women's sanda were added. Then in 2005 with the rules revision and new scoring system, compulsory routines were discontinued. The following rendition in 2007 introduced incidental music for taijiquan and taijijian events.

In 2013 after the ratification of the third set of compulsory routines, additional events for compulsory changquan, nanquan, and taijiquan were held at the WWC that year as well as in 2015. The 2015 WWC also introduced traditional events: men's xingyiquan and dadao, and women's baguazhang and shuangjian. These traditional events would reappear at the 14th and 15th WWCs though men's dadao was replaced with shuangdao. Also in the 15th WWC in 2019, the competition consisted of a creative group-set (jiti) event with certified and celebrity judges as a demonstration event. The 16th WWC will also consist of a demonstration event.

== All-time medal table ==
Last updated after the 2023 World Wushu Championships.

Rank	Nation	Gold	Silver	Bronze	Total
1	China	257	13	2	272
2	Hong Kong	57	74	50	181
3	Iran	57	24	25	106
4	Vietnam	43	63	64	170
5	Russia	39	33	34	106
6	Malaysia	34	40	50	124
7	Macau	28	41	39	108
8	South Korea	26	45	53	124
9	Philippines	18	24	40	82
10	Indonesia	17	18	28	63
11	Japan	15	39	46	100
12	Chinese Taipei	9	25	24	58
13	Egypt	9	19	33	61
14	Singapore	6	18	19	43
15	Myanmar	5	9	7	21
16	Italy	4	10	20	34
17	Netherlands	4	3	7	14
18	Individual Neutral Athletes	4	0	4	8
19	India	3	13	19	35
20	Brazil	3	9	17	29
21	Romania	3	9	15	27
22	Turkmenistan	3	3	4	10
23	United States	2	17	34	53
24	Ukraine	2	11	15	28
25	Turkey	2	10	28	40
26	France	2	7	24	33
27	Kazakhstan	2	4	10	16
28	Lebanon	2	3	12	17
29	Australia	2	0	3	5
30	Soviet Union	2	0	0	2
31	Spain	1	7	7	15
32	Azerbaijan	1	7	5	13
33	Canada	1	4	15	20
34	Tunisia	1	3	6	10
35	Great Britain	1	2	9	12
36	Armenia	1	2	8	11
37	Tajikistan	1	1	1	3
38	Israel	1	0	1	2
39	Belarus	0	5	6	11
40	Sweden	0	4	10	14
41	Kyrgyzstan	0	2	4	6
42	Mexico	0	2	3	5
43	Bermuda	0	2	1	3
43	Venezuela	0	2	1	3
45	Switzerland	0	1	5	6
46	Poland	0	1	4	5
46	Uzbekistan	0	1	4	5
48	Argentina	0	1	2	3
48	Brunei	0	1	2	3
48	Mongolia	0	1	2	3
51	Czech Republic	0	1	1	2
51	Morocco	0	1	1	2
53	Algeria	0	0	12	12
54	Germany	0	0	4	4
54	Greece	0	0	4	4
54	Yemen	0	0	4	4
57	Jordan	0	0	3	3
58	Belgium	0	0	2	2
58	Portugal	0	0	2	2
58	South Africa	0	0	2	2
58	Sri Lanka	0	0	2	2
58	Thailand	0	0	2	2
63	Afghanistan	0	0	1	1
63	Colombia	0	0	1	1
63	Georgia	0	0	1	1
63	New Zealand	0	0	1	1
63	North Korea	0	0	1	1
63	Peru	0	0	1	1
Totals (68 entries)		668	635	867	2,170

The sum totals of gold, silver and bronze medals are not equal for the following reasons:

- Sanda events changed from awarding one bronze medal to two bronze medals per event in 1993.
- Occasional none-awarding or sharing of prizes.
- The 1995 rendition had several winners per each prize in taolu events while sanda events only awarded a gold medal to the winner of each event.
- Stripped medals are taken into account in the table above.

== Statistics ==
=== Multiple gold medalists ===
==== Taolu ====
Rank	Athlete	Country	From	To	Gold	Silver	Bronze	Total
1	Nguyễn Thúy Hiền	Vietnam	1993	2003	7	6	2	15
2	Park Chan-dea	South Korea	1993	2001	6	7	2	15
3	Ng Siu Ching	Hong Kong / Hong Kong	1991	2001	5	6	3	14
4	Geng Xiaoling	Hong Kong	2005	2015	5	6	1	12
5	Liu Xuxu	Hong Kong	2017	2019	5	3	1	9
6	Lindswell Kwok	Indonesia	2009	2017	5	2	2	9
7	Jia Rui	Macau	2005	2013	4	6	1	11
8	Tan Cheong Min	Malaysia	2017		4	4	2	10
9	Đàm Thanh Xuân	Vietnam	1999	2005	4	3	-	7
10	He Jianxin	Hong Kong	2017	2023	4	2	2	8
11	Li Fai	Hong Kong / Hong Kong	1991	2001	4	2	3	9

==== Sanda ====
Rank	Athlete	Country	From	To	Gold	Silver	Bronze	Total
1	Shahrbanoo Mansourian	Iran	2011	2025	6	-	-	6
2	Mohsen Mohammadseifi	Iran	2009	2025	5	2	-	7
2	Muslim Salikhov	Russia	2005	2015	5	1	-	6
2	Bozigit Ataev	Russia	1999	2013	5	1	-	6
5	Hamid Reza Gholipour	Iran	2007	2019	4	2	-	6
6	Mohammad Reza Jafari	Iran	1997	2005	4	-	1	5
7	Hossein Ojaghi	Iran	1997	2009	3	2	1	6
8	Elaheh Mansourian	Iran	2009	2017	3	1	1	5
9	Ramazan Ramazanov	Soviet Union / Russia	1991	1995	3	-	-	3
9	Kazbek Zhaparov	Soviet Union / Russia	1991	1995	3	-	-	3

=== Multiple medalists ===
==== Taolu ====
Rank	Athlete	Country	From	To	Gold	Silver	Bronze	Total
1	Nguyễn Thúy Hiền	Vietnam	1993	2003	7	6	2	15
1	Park Chan-dea	South Korea	1993	2001	6	7	2	15
3	Ng Siu Ching	Hong Kong / Hong Kong	1991	2001	5	6	3	14
5	Geng Xiaoling	Hong Kong	2005	2015	5	6	1	12
6	Dương Thúy Vi	Vietnam	2011		2	6	4	12
7	Wong Weng Son	Malaysia	2015	2023	2	8	1	11
7	Jia Rui	Macau	2005	2013	4	6	1	11
7	Nguyễn Phương Lan	Vietnam	1995	2001	1	5	5	11

== See also ==
- List of international wushu competitions
- World Junior Wushu Championships
