= Gun (staff) =

Long staff weapon used in Chinese martial arts

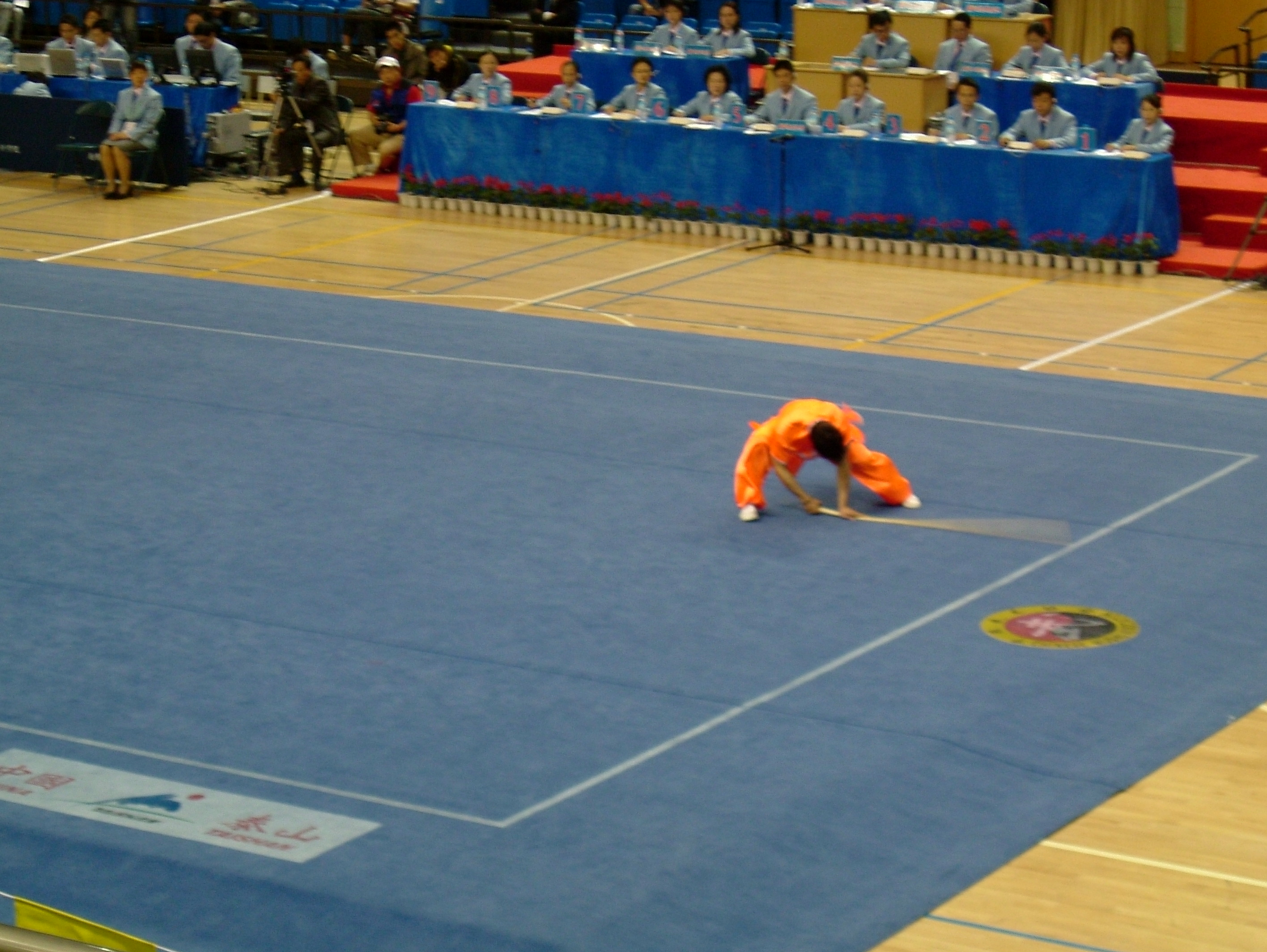
Gunshu event at the 2005 National Games of China

A gun (pronunciation [kwə̂n], English approximation: /ɡuən/ gwən, Chinese: 棍; pinyin: gùn; Jyutping: gwan3; lit. 'rod', 'stick') or bang (Chinese: 棒; pinyin: bàng; Jyutping: paang5; lit. 'rod', 'club') is a long staff weapon used in Chinese martial arts. It is known as one of the four major weapons in Chinese martial arts, along with the qiang (spear), dao (sabre), and the jian (straight sword). It is called, in this group, "The Grandfather of all Weapons". In Vietnam (as a result of Chinese influence), the gun is known as côn in Vietnamese martial arts.

== Variants and styles ==
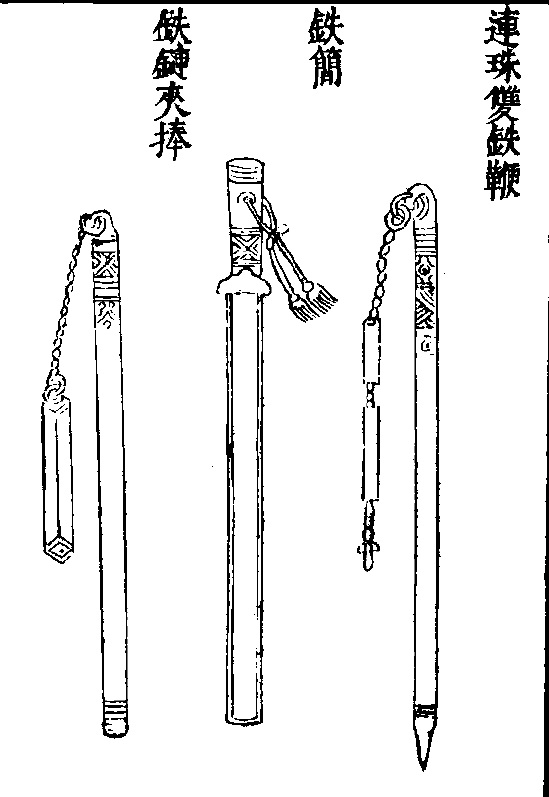
A flail-like iron staff (left) in military compendium Wujing Zongyao

Schematic representation of the three main Chinese martial arts staffs

The gun is fashioned with one thick end as the base and a thinner end near the tip, and is cut to be about the same height as the user or 6 foot. Besides the standard gun, there are also flail-like two section and three section varieties of the staff as well as non-tapered heavier variants. Numerous Chinese martial arts teach the staff as part of their curriculum, including (in English alphabetical order):

- Bagua seven star rod (Chinese: 八卦七星竿; pinyin: bāguà qīxīng gān) or Seven Star Stick (Qi Xing Gun), also called the Whip Stick (Bian Gun) or Heart High Stick (Xin Gun) - it is lighter and faster than the Ba Gua Staff, it can be used one-handed or two-handed.
- Bailangan, Northern staff (simplified Chinese: 白栏杆; traditional Chinese: 白欄杆; pinyin: bái lángān)
- Nangun, Southern staff (Chinese: 南棍; pinyin: nángùn)
- Pigua Zhang's Feng Mo Gun - 'Frenzied Demon Staff' (劈掛拳 瘋魔棍).
- Shaolin Zhui Feng Gun - 'Wind Chaser Staff' (虎勇敢)
- Qún Yáng Gùn, Shepherd staff (This routine is performed with a straight heavy red oak staff)
- Six and a half point pole (Chinese: 六點半棍; Jyutping: luk6 dim2 bun3 gwan3)
- Staff of five tigers and goat herds (Chinese: 五虎群羊棍; pinyin: wǔ hǔ qún yáng gùn)
- Taiji staff (simplified Chinese: 太极棍; traditional Chinese: 太極棍; pinyin: tàijí gùn)
- Taiji thirteen staff (simplified Chinese: 太极十三秆; traditional Chinese: 太極十三杆; pinyin: tàijí shísān gǎn)

Bailangan and nangun are frequently found in modern wushu competitions in gunshu and nangun events respectively. The IWUF has created three different standardized routines and an elementary routine for gunshu and two different routines for nangun.

== In contemporary wushu ==
Gunshu refers to the competitive event in modern wushu taolu where athletes utilize a gun in a routine. It was one of the four main weapon events implemented at the 1st World Wushu Championships due to its popularity. Modern staffs are often made from wax wood or rattan, both of which are strong woods, but flexible and light. Some versions may also feature metal or rubber parts, and the current modern staffs for competition are usually made of light carbon fiber. The newer staffs do not break like the wax wood ones and are even lighter.

The IWUF has also created three different standardized routines for competition as well as an elementary routine. The first compulsory routine was created and recorded by Yuan Wenqing in 1989.

Gunshu routines in international competition require certain staff techniques including: Píng Lūn Gùn (Horizontal Cudgel Windmill Wave), Pī Gùn (Cudgel Chop), Yún Gùn (Cudgel Cloud Waving), Bēng Gùn (Cudgel Tilt), Jiǎo Gùn (Cudgel Enveloping), Chuō Gùn (Cudgel Poke), Lì Wǔ Huā Gùn (Vertical Figure 8 with the Cudgel), Shuāng Shǒu Tí Liāo Huā Gùn (Two-handed Vertical Cudgel Uppercut). Only the Píng Lūn Gùn and Lì Wǔ Huā Gùn techniques have deduction content (codes 64 and 65 respectively).

== See also ==
- Ruyi Jingu Bang, Sun Wukong's weapon
- Ji, halberd
- Bō and Jō, Japanese staves
- Quarterstaff, European staff
- Juego del Palo, Canarian (Spanish) staff
- Canne de combat, French staff
- Jogo do Pau, Portuguese staff
