= International Wushu Federation =

International governing body for wushu

- Abbreviation: IWUF
- Formation: October 3, 1990; Beijing
- Type: Sports association
- Legal status: Federation
- Purpose: Development of wushu worldwide
- Headquarters: Lausanne, Switzerland; Beijing, China
- Region served: International
- Members: 155 nations
- Official language: Chinese and English
- President: Gao Zhidan
- Main organ: IWUF Congress
- Website: www.iwuf.org

Chinese name
- Simplified Chinese: 国际武术联合会
- Traditional Chinese: 國際武術聯合會
Transcriptions
Standard Mandarin
- Hanyu Pinyin: Guójì Wǔshù Liánhéhuì

The International Wushu Federation (IWUF) is an international sport organization and the governing body for wushu in all its forms worldwide. The IWUF is recognized by the International Olympic Committee (IOC), and is also a member of the ARISF, GAISF, FISU, IWGA, and the ISF.

== Organization ==
The main governing bodies of the IWUF are the President and the Executive Board, the Secretariat, the Congress which meets every two years, and various technical committees. The IWUF's headquarters are located in Lausanne, Switzerland, and Beijing, China. The current president is Zhongwen Gou of China (2019-present).

As of 2020, there are 155 national federations affiliated with the IWUF which are organized under the following continental federations:

- Wushu Federation of Asia
- European Wushu Federation
- Pan American Wushu Federation
- African Wushu Federation
- Oceania Wushu Kungfu Federation

== History ==
On October 3, 1990 in Beijing during the 11th Asian Games, the IWUF was established after four years of development by a preparatory committee from the Chinese Wushu Association (CWA). Since 1991, the IWUF has held 15 World Wushu Championships and has helped over 100 federations (List of member federations External) around the globe to organize their own championships and national tournaments. The IWUF has also been in an active pursuit of olympic wushu after being fully recognized by the IOC in 2002. The IWUF fell short of having wushu becoming an Olympic sport in 2008, but the IOC allowed them to host an international wushu competition alongside the 2008 Summer Olympics, which was known as the 2008 Beijing Wushu Tournament. During the 2014 Summer Youth Olympics in Nanjing, Jiangsu, China, wushu was an official demonstration sport, and wushu will return to the Youth Olympics in 2026. The IWUF hoped for inclusion in the 2020 Olympics but wushu was shortlisted in 2013 and again in 2015. Despite this, wushu has been included in several multi-sport events such as the Asian Games, East Asian Youth Games, Southeast Asian Games, World Games, World Combat Games, and the Universiade.

The IWUF has redefined the definition of sport wushu, dividing it into two main disciplines: taolu (forms), and sanda (unarmed combat).

== Competitions ==
=== Primary ===
- World Wushu Championships
- World Junior Wushu Championships
- World Kungfu Championships
- Sanda World Cup
- Taolu World Cup
- World Taijiquan Championships

=== Special/historical ===
- 2008 Beijing Wushu Tournament
- 2014 Nanjing Youth Wushu Tournament

== See also ==
- Association of IOC Recognised International Sports Federations
