= Wushu at the Asian Games =

- Governing bodies: IWUF (World) / WFA (Asia)
- Events: 15 (men: 9; women: 6)

Games
- 1951; 1954; 1958; 1962; 1966; 1970; 1974; 1978; 1982; 1986; 1990; 1994; 1998; 2002; 2006; 2010; 2014; 2018; 2022; 2026
- Medalists

Wushu has been contested at the Asian Games since 1990 in Beijing, China.

== Editions ==
Games	Year	Host city	Best nation
XI	1990	Beijing, China	China
XII	1994	Hiroshima, Japan	China
XIII	1998	Bangkok, Thailand	China
XIV	2002	Busan, South Korea	China
XV	2006	Doha, Qatar	China
XVI	2010	Guangzhou, China	China
XVII	2014	Incheon, South Korea	China
XVIII	2018	Jakarta–Palembang, Indonesia	China
XIX	2022	Hangzhou, China	China
XX	2026	Aichi–Nagoya, Japan	China

== Events ==
Event	90	94	98	02	06	10	14	18	22	26	Years
Men
Changquan	X	X	X	X	X	X	X	X	X	X	10
Nanquan	X	X	X	X	X	X	X	X	X	X	10
Taijiquan	X	X	X	X	X	X	X	X	X	X	10
Daoshu & Gunshu						X	X	X	X	X	5
Sanda 52 kg			X	X	X						3
Sanda 56 kg			X	X	X	X	X	X	X	X	8
Sanda 60 kg			X	X	X	X	X	X	X	X	8
Sanda 65 kg			X	X	X	X	X	X	X	X	8
Sanda 70 kg			X	X	X	X	X	X	X	X	8
Sanda 75 kg						X	X		X	X	4
Women
Changquan	X	X	X	X	X	X	X	X	X	X	10
Nanquan	X	X	X	X	X	X	X	X	X	X	10
Taijiquan	X	X	X	X	X	X	X	X	X	X	10
Jianshu & Qiangshu						X	X	X	X	X	5
Sanda 52 kg						X	X	X	X	X	5
Sanda 60 kg						X	X	X	X	X	5
Total	6	6	11	11	11	15	15	14	15	15	

== Medal table ==
Rank	Nation	Gold	Silver	Bronze	Total
1	China (CHN)	86	10	4	100
2	Iran (IRI)	10	16	7	33
3	Macau (MAC)	4	12	6	22
4	Hong Kong (HKG)	3	15	7	25
5	South Korea (KOR)	3	9	14	26
6	Indonesia (INA)	3	6	13	22
7	Malaysia (MAS)	3	2	7	12
8	Thailand (THA)	2	3	7	12
9	Vietnam (VIE)	1	13	21	35
10	Japan (JPN)	1	9	7	17
11	Philippines (PHI)	1	8	14	23
12	Chinese Taipei (TPE)	1	5	17	23
13	Myanmar (MYA)	1	1	3	5
14	India (IND)	0	3	8	11
15	Kazakhstan (KAZ)	0	2	5	7
16	Uzbekistan (UZB)	0	2	3	5
17	Singapore (SGP)	0	1	8	9
18	Laos (LAO)	0	1	6	7
19	Pakistan (PAK)	0	1	2	3
20	Brunei (BRU)	0	1	1	2
21	Afghanistan (AFG)	0	0	5	5
22	Mongolia (MGL)	0	0	3	3
23	Kyrgyzstan (KGZ)	0	0	2	2
23	Turkmenistan (TKM)	0	0	2	2
25	Bangladesh (BAN)	0	0	1	1
25	Yemen (YEM)	0	0	1	1
Totals (26 entries)		119	120	174	413

== Participating nations ==
Nation	90	94	98	02	06	10	14	18	22	26	Years
Afghanistan					2	9	5	5	4	4	6
Bangladesh						4	2			4	3
Brunei						2		4	6	5	4
Cambodia			2								1
China	12	8	10	10	9	10	12	13	11	12	10
Chinese Taipei	X	5	11	10	11	8	8	10	10	10	10
Hong Kong	9	7	8	9	9	8	8	8	7	10	10
India					7	10	9	13	10	7	6
Indonesia		2	1	6	3	8	6	13	12	13	9
Iran			7	7	7	9	10	9	13	12	8
Japan	12	8	8	9	6	6	6	6	6	7	10
Jordan						1	4				2
Kazakhstan		4	4	5	6	3	4	8	6	6	9
Kuwait					1		2				2
Kyrgyzstan				3	9	7	6	4	4	4	7
Laos			4	3	3	9	7	6	3	4	8
Lebanon				2	5	4	3	1			5
Macau	X	7	7	11	11	11	9	9	9	10	10
Malaysia	6	5	3	8	6	8	8	7	7	7	10
Mongolia		8	5	4	3	2	3		2	6	8
Myanmar				5	4	4	7	9	4		6
Nepal	X	6	5	4	8	13	13	10	12	10	10
North Korea					1	2					2
Pakistan				1	3	4	6	9	4	4	7
Philippines	X	3	8	10	8	6	5	8	8	10	10
Singapore	X	5	5	5	7	5	6	5	7	7	10
South Korea	X	5		11	11	13	13	12	11	13	9
Sri Lanka				1	4	1		2	2	1	6
Syria					4						1
Tajikistan						1	2	1	1	4	5
Thailand			8	5	5	4		9	10	6	7
Turkmenistan						4	6		6	5	4
Uzbekistan		1			4	2	4	4	6	9	7
Vietnam	X	5	10	11	8	11	13	12	13	13	10
Yemen				2	3	4	3	4	2	3	7
Number of nations	11	15	17	23	29	32	29	27	28	28	
Number of athletes	96	79	106	142	168	193	190	201	196	206	
