= Wushu at the 1994 Asian Games =

- Venue: Aki Ward Sports Center
- Dates: 12–14 October 1994
- Competitors: 79 from 15 nations

Wushu was contested by both men and women at the 1994 Asian Games in Aki Ward Sports Center, Hiroshima, Japan from October 12 to October 14, 1994. It was competed in the disciplines of Taolu with six events, tai chi, Nanquan and Changquan for both genders. Changquan event consisted of Changquan, one long weapon discipline and one short weapon discipline.

== Schedule ==
●	Round	●	Last round

Event↓/Date →	12th Sat	13th Thu	14th Fri
Men's changquan combined	●	●	●
Men's nanquan		●	
Men's taijiquan	●		
Women's changquan combined	●	●	●
Women's nanquan		●	
Women's taijiquan			●

== Medalists ==
=== Men ===
Event	Gold	Silver	Bronze
Changquan combined	Yuan Wenqing; China	Park Chan-dae; South Korea	Hiroshi Yoshida; Japan
Nanquan	He Qiang; China	Leung Yat Ho; Hong Kong	Phoon Chee Kong; Malaysia
Nanquan	He Qiang; China	Leung Yat Ho; Hong Kong	Richard Ng; Philippines
Nanquan	He Qiang; China	Leung Yat Ho; Hong Kong	Lee Chun-hui; Chinese Taipei
Taijiquan	Masaru Masuda; Japan	Chan Ming-shu; Chinese Taipei	Han Gyeong-su; South Korea
Taijiquan	Masaru Masuda; Japan	Chan Ming-shu; Chinese Taipei	Daniel Go; Philippines

=== Women ===
Event	Gold	Silver	Bronze
Changquan combined	Zhuang Hui; China	Momi Matsumura; Japan	Chiew Hui Yan; Singapore
Nanquan	Wang Huiling; China	Lei Fei; Macau	Ng Siu Ching; Hong Kong
Taijiquan	Gao Jiamin; China	Naoko Masuda; Japan	Tan Mui Buay; Singapore

== Medal table ==
Rank	Nation	Gold	Silver	Bronze	Total
1	China (CHN)	5	0	0	5
2	Japan (JPN)	1	2	1	4
3	Chinese Taipei (TPE)	0	1	1	2
3	Hong Kong (HKG)	0	1	1	2
3	South Korea (KOR)	0	1	1	2
6	Macau (MAC)	0	1	0	1
7	Philippines (PHI)	0	0	2	2
7	Singapore (SIN)	0	0	2	2
9	Malaysia (MAS)	0	0	1	1
Totals (9 entries)		6	6	9	21

== Participating nations ==
A total of 79 athletes from 15 nations competed in wushu at the 1994 Asian Games:

- China (8)
- Chinese Taipei (5)
- Hong Kong (7)
- Indonesia (2)
- Japan (8)
- Kazakhstan (4)
- Macau (7)
- Malaysia (5)
- Mongolia (8)
- Nepal (6)
- Philippines (3)
- Singapore (5)
- South Korea (5)
- Uzbekistan (1)
- Vietnam (5)
