= Wushu at the 1998 Asian Games =

- Venue: Thammasat Gymnasium 6
- Dates: 16–19 December 1998
- Competitors: 106 from 17 nations

Wushu was contested by both men and women at the 1998 Asian Games in Bangkok, Thailand from December 16 to December 19, 1998. It was competed in the disciplines of Taijiquan, Changquan, Nanquan and sanshou. All events were held at Thammasat Gymnasium 6. Changquan event consisted of Changquan, one long weapon discipline and one short weapon discipline.

== Schedule ==
●	Round	●	Last round	R	Round of 16	¼	Quarterfinals	½	Semifinals	F	Final

Event↓/Date →	16th Wed	17th Thu	18th Fri	19th Sat
Men's changquan combined	●	●	●	
Men's nanquan		●		
Men's taijiquan	●			
Men's sanshou 52 kg	R	¼	½	F
Men's sanshou 56 kg	R	¼	½	F
Men's sanshou 60 kg	¼	¼	½	F
Men's sanshou 65 kg	R	¼	½	F
Men's sanshou 70 kg	¼	½	½	F
Women's changquan combined	●	●	●	
Women's nanquan		●		
Women's taijiquan			●	

== Medalists ==
=== Men's taolu ===
Event	Gold	Silver	Bronze
Changquan combined	Wu Gang; China	Mark Robert Rosales; Philippines	Shared silver
Changquan combined	Wu Gang; China	Oh Poh Soon; Malaysia	Shared silver
Nanquan	Lang Rongbiao; China	Leung Yat Ho; Hong Kong	Voradej Puangthong; Thailand
Nanquan	Lang Rongbiao; China	Leung Yat Ho; Hong Kong	Ho Ro Bin; Malaysia
Nanquan	Lang Rongbiao; China	Leung Yat Ho; Hong Kong	Picasso Tan; Singapore
Taijiquan	Chan Ming-shu; Chinese Taipei	Toshiya Watanabe; Japan	Nguyễn Anh Minh; Vietnam

=== Men's sanshou ===
Event	Gold	Silver	Bronze
52 kg	Xing Zhijie; China	Rolly Chulhang; Philippines	Teerawat Donniart; Thailand
52 kg	Xing Zhijie; China	Rolly Chulhang; Philippines	Phoukhong Khamsounthone; Laos
56 kg	Zheng Kunyou; China	Pichit Jaisak; Thailand	Roger Chulhang; Philippines
56 kg	Zheng Kunyou; China	Pichit Jaisak; Thailand	Yeh Chun-chang; Chinese Taipei
60 kg	Sun Xunchang; China	Komsan Thongtup; Thailand	Nurlan Zhunuspekov; Kazakhstan
60 kg	Sun Xunchang; China	Komsan Thongtup; Thailand	Wang Yeh-hao; Chinese Taipei
65 kg	You Bangmeng; China	Hsu Chin-kun; Chinese Taipei	Trần Đức Trang; Vietnam
65 kg	You Bangmeng; China	Hsu Chin-kun; Chinese Taipei	Dias Zhamash; Kazakhstan
70 kg	Xiao Xiaobang; China	Hossein Ojaghi; Iran	Oon Srikolam; Thailand
70 kg	Xiao Xiaobang; China	Hossein Ojaghi; Iran	Jerome Lumabas; Philippines

=== Women's taolu ===
Event	Gold	Silver	Bronze
Changquan combined	Liu Qinghua; China	Nguyễn Thúy Hiền; Vietnam	Yuri Kaminiwa; Japan
Nanquan	Ng Siu Ching; Hong Kong	Lei Fei; Macau	Cho Yu-chiao; Chinese Taipei
Taijiquan	Gao Jiamin; China	Fan Xueping; China	Jainab; Indonesia

== Medal table ==
Rank	Nation	Gold	Silver	Bronze	Total
1	China (CHN)	9	1	0	10
2	Chinese Taipei (TPE)	1	1	3	5
3	Hong Kong (HKG)	1	1	0	2
4	Thailand (THA)	0	2	3	5
5	Philippines (PHI)	0	2	2	4
6	Vietnam (VIE)	0	1	2	3
7	Japan (JPN)	0	1	1	2
7	Malaysia (MAS)	0	1	1	2
9	Iran (IRI)	0	1	0	1
9	Macau (MAC)	0	1	0	1
11	Kazakhstan (KAZ)	0	0	2	2
12	Indonesia (INA)	0	0	1	1
12	Laos (LAO)	0	0	1	1
12	Singapore (SIN)	0	0	1	1
Totals (14 entries)		11	12	17	40

== Participating nations ==
A total of 106 athletes from 17 nations competed in wushu at the 1998 Asian Games:

- Cambodia (2)
- China (10)
- Chinese Taipei (11)
- Hong Kong (8)
- Indonesia (1)
- Iran (7)
- Japan (8)
- Kazakhstan (4)
- Laos (4)
- Macau (7)
- Malaysia (3)
- Mongolia (5)
- Nepal (5)
- Philippines (8)
- Singapore (5)
- Thailand (8)
- Vietnam (10)
