= List of Asian Games medalists in wushu =

This is the complete list of Asian Games medalists in wushu from 1990 to 2026.

== Men ==
=== Taolu ===
==== Changquan ====
- Changquan & Short weapon (Daoshu or Jianshu) & Long weapon (Gunshu or Qiangshu): 1990–1998
- Changquan & Daoshu & Gunshu: 2002–2006
- Changquan: 2010–

Games	Gold	Silver	Bronze
1990 Beijing	Yuan Wenqing (CHN)	Liu Zhenling (CHN)	Hai Choi Lam (HKG)
1994 Hiroshima	Yuan Wenqing (CHN)	Park Chan-dae (KOR)	Hiroshi Yoshida (JPN)
1998 Bangkok	Wu Gang (CHN)	Oh Poh Soon (MAS)	Shared silver
1998 Bangkok	Wu Gang (CHN)	Mark Robert Rosales (PHI)	Shared silver
2002 Busan	Yuan Xindong (CHN)	Dennis To (HKG)	Arvin Ting (PHI)
2006 Doha	Yuan Xiaochao (CHN)	Jia Rui (MAC)	Aung Si Thu (MYA)
2010 Guangzhou	Yuan Xiaochao (CHN)	Daisuke Ichikizaki (JPN)	Ehsan Peighambari (IRI)
2014 Incheon	Lee Ha-sung (KOR)	Jia Rui (MAC)	Daisuke Ichikizaki (JPN)
2018 Jakarta–Palembang	Sun Peiyuan (CHN)	Edgar Xavier Marvelo (INA)	Tsai Tse-min (TPE)
2022 Hangzhou	Sun Peiyuan (CHN)	Edgar Xavier Marvelo (INA)	Song Chi Kuan (MAC)
2026 Aichi–Nagoya	Kuong Chi Hin (MAC)	Song Chi Kuan (MAC)	Seraf Naro Siregar (INA)

==== Nanquan ====
- Nanquan: 1990–1998
- Nanquan & Nandao & Nangun: 2002–2006
- Nanquan & Nangun: 2010–

Games	Gold	Silver	Bronze
1990 Beijing	He Qiang (CHN)	Leung Yat Ho (HKG)	Wong Tong Ieong (MAC)
1994 Hiroshima	He Qiang (CHN)	Leung Yat Ho (HKG)	Phoon Chee Kong (MAS)
1994 Hiroshima	He Qiang (CHN)	Leung Yat Ho (HKG)	Richard Ng (PHI)
1994 Hiroshima	He Qiang (CHN)	Leung Yat Ho (HKG)	Lee Chun-hui (TPE)
1998 Bangkok	Lang Rongbiao (CHN)	Leung Yat Ho (HKG)	Ho Ro Bin (MAS)
1998 Bangkok	Lang Rongbiao (CHN)	Leung Yat Ho (HKG)	Picasso Tan (SIN)
1998 Bangkok	Lang Rongbiao (CHN)	Leung Yat Ho (HKG)	Voradej Puangthong (THA)
2002 Busan	Ho Ro Bin (MAS)	Hu Lifeng (CHN)	Cheng Ka Ho (HKG)
2006 Doha	Wu Caibao (CHN)	Phạm Quốc Khánh (VIE)	Lee Seung-kuen (KOR)
2010 Guangzhou	Huang Guangyuan (CHN)	He Jingde (HKG)	Phạm Quốc Khánh (VIE)
2014 Incheon	Wang Di (CHN)	Huang Junhua (MAC)	Hsu Kai-kuei (TPE)
2018 Jakarta–Palembang	Huang Junhua (MAC)	Phạm Quốc Khánh (VIE)	Lee Yong-mun (KOR)
2022 Hangzhou	Harris Horatius (INA)	Lee Yong-mun (KOR)	Huang Junhua (MAC)
2026 Aichi–Nagoya	Li Jianming (CHN)	Lau Chi Lung (HKG)	Liu Chang-min (TPE)

==== Taijiquan ====
- Taijiquan: 1990–1998
- Taijiquan & Taijijian: 2002–

Games	Gold	Silver	Bronze
1990 Beijing	Chen Sitan (CHN)	Wang Zengxiang (CHN)	Nobutsugu Arai (JPN)
1994 Hiroshima	Masaru Masuda (JPN)	Chan Ming-shu (TPE)	Han Gyeong-su (KOR)
1994 Hiroshima	Masaru Masuda (JPN)	Chan Ming-shu (TPE)	Daniel Go (PHI)
1998 Bangkok	Chan Ming-shu (TPE)	Toshiya Watanabe (JPN)	Nguyễn Anh Minh (VIE)
2002 Busan	Yang Seong-chan (KOR)	Chan Ming-shu (TPE)	Bobby Co (PHI)
2006 Doha	Wu Yanan (CHN)	Hei Zhihong (HKG)	Goh Qiu Bin (SIN)
2010 Guangzhou	Wu Yanan (CHN)	Nguyễn Thanh Tùng (VIE)	Hsiao Yung-jih (TPE)
2014 Incheon	Chen Zhouli (CHN)	Daniel Parantac (PHI)	Nguyễn Thanh Tùng (VIE)
2018 Jakarta–Palembang	Chen Zhouli (CHN)	Tomohiro Araya (JPN)	Nyein Chan Ko Ko (MYA)
2022 Hangzhou	Gao Haonan (CHN)	Samuei Hui (HKG)	Jones Inso (PHI)
2026 Aichi–Nagoya	Liu Dewen (CHN)	Sun Chia-hung (TPE)	An Hyeon-gi (KOR)

==== Daoshu & Gunshu ====
Games	Gold	Silver	Bronze
2010 Guangzhou	Jia Rui (MAC)	Lee Jong-chan (KOR)	Nguyễn Mạnh Quyền (VIE)
2014 Incheon	Sun Peiyuan (CHN)	Lee Yong-hyun (KOR)	Nguyễn Mạnh Quyền (VIE)
2018 Jakarta–Palembang	Wu Zhaohua (CHN)	Cho Seung-jae (KOR)	Achmad Hulaefi (INA)
2022 Hangzhou	Chang Zhizhao (CHN)	Jowen Lim (SGP)	Seraf Naro Siregar (INA)
2026 Aichi–Nagoya	Gao Xiaobin (CHN)	Lee Ha-sung (KOR)	Clement Ting (MAS)

=== Sanda ===
==== 52 kg ====
Games	Gold	Silver	Bronze
1998 Bangkok	Xing Zhijie (CHN)	Rolly Chulhang (PHI)	Phoukhong Khamsounthone (LAO)
1998 Bangkok	Xing Zhijie (CHN)	Rolly Chulhang (PHI)	Teerawat Donniart (THA)
2002 Busan	Kang Yonggang (CHN)	Marvin Sicomen (PHI)	Phoukhong Khamsounthone (LAO)
2002 Busan	Kang Yonggang (CHN)	Marvin Sicomen (PHI)	Lee Hou-cheng (TPE)
2006 Doha	Rene Catalan (PHI)	Phan Quốc Vinh (VIE)	Khwanyuen Chanthra (THA)
2006 Doha	Rene Catalan (PHI)	Phan Quốc Vinh (VIE)	Naji Al-Ashwal (YEM)

==== 56 kg ====
Games	Gold	Silver	Bronze
1998 Bangkok	Zheng Kunyou (CHN)	Pichit Jaisak (THA)	Roger Chulhang (PHI)
1998 Bangkok	Zheng Kunyou (CHN)	Pichit Jaisak (THA)	Yeh Chun-chang (TPE)
2002 Busan	Sanchai Chomphuphuang (THA)	Rexel Nganhayna (PHI)	Ölziibadrakhyn Saruul-Od (MGL)
2002 Busan	Sanchai Chomphuphuang (THA)	Rexel Nganhayna (PHI)	Yeh Chun-chang (TPE)
2006 Doha	Li Teng (CHN)	Phoxay Aphailath (LAO)	Jalil Ataei (IRI)
2006 Doha	Li Teng (CHN)	Phoxay Aphailath (LAO)	Kim Jun-yul (KOR)
2010 Guangzhou	Li Xinjie (CHN)	Phan Văn Hậu (VIE)	Phoxay Aphailath (LAO)
2010 Guangzhou	Li Xinjie (CHN)	Phan Văn Hậu (VIE)	Khwanyuen Chanthra (THA)
2014 Incheon	Zhao Fuxiang (CHN)	Bùi Trường Giang (VIE)	Khamla Soukaphone (LAO)
2014 Incheon	Zhao Fuxiang (CHN)	Bùi Trường Giang (VIE)	Francisco Solis (PHI)
2018 Jakarta–Palembang	Shen Guoshun (CHN)	Bùi Trường Giang (VIE)	Yusuf Widiyanto (INA)
2018 Jakarta–Palembang	Shen Guoshun (CHN)	Bùi Trường Giang (VIE)	Santosh Kumar (IND)
2022 Hangzhou	Jiang Haidong (CHN)	Arnel Mandal (PHI)	Avazbek Amanbekov (KGZ)
2022 Hangzhou	Jiang Haidong (CHN)	Arnel Mandal (PHI)	Hứa Văn Đoàn (VIE)
2026 Aichi–Nagoya	Ou Jiaming (CHN)	Đinh Văn Tâm (VIE)	Fereddy Sinaga (INA)
2026 Aichi–Nagoya	Ou Jiaming (CHN)	Đinh Văn Tâm (VIE)	Saydullo Abdurashitov (UZB)

==== 60 kg ====
Games	Gold	Silver	Bronze
1998 Bangkok	Sun Xunchang (CHN)	Komsan Thongtup (THA)	Nurlan Zhunuspekov (KAZ)
1998 Bangkok	Sun Xunchang (CHN)	Komsan Thongtup (THA)	Wang Yeh-hao (TPE)
2002 Busan	Liu Zedong (CHN)	Kim Gwee-jong (KOR)	Vanxay Oudomphon (LAO)
2002 Busan	Liu Zedong (CHN)	Kim Gwee-jong (KOR)	Vichan Toonkratork (THA)
2006 Doha	Ma Chao (CHN)	Alireza Sahraneshini (IRI)	M. Bimoljit Singh (IND)
2006 Doha	Ma Chao (CHN)	Alireza Sahraneshini (IRI)	Qin Zhi Jian (MAC)
2010 Guangzhou	Mohsen Mohammadseifi (IRI)	Kim Jun-yul (KOR)	M. Bimoljit Singh (IND)
2010 Guangzhou	Mohsen Mohammadseifi (IRI)	Kim Jun-yul (KOR)	Nguyễn Minh Thông (VIE)
2014 Incheon	Kong Hongxing (CHN)	Jean Claude Saclag (PHI)	Narender Grewal (IND)
2014 Incheon	Kong Hongxing (CHN)	Jean Claude Saclag (PHI)	Kang Yeong-sik (KOR)
2018 Jakarta–Palembang	Erfan Ahangarian (IRI)	Wang Xuetao (CHN)	Surya Bhanu Pratap Singh (IND)
2018 Jakarta–Palembang	Erfan Ahangarian (IRI)	Wang Xuetao (CHN)	Nghiêm Văn Ý (VIE)
2022 Hangzhou	Wang Xuetao (CHN)	Shoja Panahi (IRI)	Kim Min-soo (KOR)
2022 Hangzhou	Wang Xuetao (CHN)	Shoja Panahi (IRI)	Gideon Fred Padua (PHI)
2026 Aichi–Nagoya	Tang Sishuo (CHN)	Leung Yu Hong (HKG)	Bintang Reindra (INA)
2026 Aichi–Nagoya	Tang Sishuo (CHN)	Leung Yu Hong (HKG)	Hứa Văn Đoàn (VIE)

==== 65 kg ====
Games	Gold	Silver	Bronze
1998 Bangkok	You Bangmeng (CHN)	Hsu Chin-kun (TPE)	Dias Zhamash (KAZ)
1998 Bangkok	You Bangmeng (CHN)	Hsu Chin-kun (TPE)	Trần Đức Trang (VIE)
2002 Busan	Angkhan Chomphuphuang (THA)	Mohammad Aghaei (IRI)	Yu Dawei (CHN)
2002 Busan	Angkhan Chomphuphuang (THA)	Mohammad Aghaei (IRI)	Eduard Folayang (PHI)
2006 Doha	Zhao Guangyong (CHN)	Nguyễn Đức Trung (VIE)	Cai Liang Chan (MAC)
2006 Doha	Zhao Guangyong (CHN)	Nguyễn Đức Trung (VIE)	Maratab Ali Shah (PAK)
2010 Guangzhou	Zhang Junyong (CHN)	Nguyễn Văn Tuấn (VIE)	Hyun Chang-ho (KOR)
2010 Guangzhou	Zhang Junyong (CHN)	Nguyễn Văn Tuấn (VIE)	Mark Eddiva (PHI)
2014 Incheon	Mohsen Mohammadseifi (IRI)	Rishat Livensho (KAZ)	Chen Hongxing (CHN)
2014 Incheon	Mohsen Mohammadseifi (IRI)	Rishat Livensho (KAZ)	Salaheddin Baýramow (TKM)
2018 Jakarta–Palembang	Li Mengfan (CHN)	Foroud Zafari (IRI)	Khalid Hotak (AFG)
2018 Jakarta–Palembang	Li Mengfan (CHN)	Foroud Zafari (IRI)	Narender Grewal (IND)
2022 Hangzhou	Afshin Salimi (IRI)	Samuel Marbun (INA)	Jeon Seong-jin (KOR)
2022 Hangzhou	Afshin Salimi (IRI)	Samuel Marbun (INA)	Clemente Tabugara (PHI)
2026 Aichi–Nagoya	Wang Chengjin (CHN)	Shoja Panahi (IRI)	Hamid Ashrafi (AFG)
2026 Aichi–Nagoya	Wang Chengjin (CHN)	Shoja Panahi (IRI)	Nguyễn Khắc Kiên (VIE)

==== 70 kg ====
Games	Gold	Silver	Bronze
1998 Bangkok	Xiao Xiaobang (CHN)	Hossein Ojaghi (IRI)	Jerome Lumabas (PHI)
1998 Bangkok	Xiao Xiaobang (CHN)	Hossein Ojaghi (IRI)	Oon Srikolam (THA)
2002 Busan	Hossein Ojaghi (IRI)	Metee Ponork (THA)	Li Jie (CHN)
2002 Busan	Hossein Ojaghi (IRI)	Metee Ponork (THA)	Magsarjavyn Batjargal (MGL)
2006 Doha	Xu Yanfei (CHN)	Eduard Folayang (PHI)	Khosro Minoo (IRI)
2006 Doha	Xu Yanfei (CHN)	Eduard Folayang (PHI)	Ahn Yong-woon (KOR)
2010 Guangzhou	Zhang Yong (CHN)	Cai Liang Chan (MAC)	Sajjad Abbasi (IRI)
2010 Guangzhou	Zhang Yong (CHN)	Cai Liang Chan (MAC)	Vương Đình Khanh (VIE)
2014 Incheon	Zhang Kun (CHN)	Yoo Sang-hoon (KOR)	Sajjad Abbasi (IRI)
2014 Incheon	Zhang Kun (CHN)	Yoo Sang-hoon (KOR)	Maratab Ali Shah (PAK)
2018 Jakarta–Palembang	Mohsen Mohammadseifi (IRI)	Shi Zhanwei (CHN)	Puja Riyaya (INA)
2018 Jakarta–Palembang	Mohsen Mohammadseifi (IRI)	Shi Zhanwei (CHN)	Ham Gwan-sik (KOR)
2022 Hangzhou	He Feng (CHN)	Mohsen Mohammadseifi (IRI)	Khalid Hotak (AFG)
2022 Hangzhou	He Feng (CHN)	Mohsen Mohammadseifi (IRI)	Zhang Huan-yi (TPE)
2026 Aichi–Nagoya	Ma Shuo (CHN)	Erfan Moharrami (IRI)	Khalid Hotak (AFG)
2026 Aichi–Nagoya	Ma Shuo (CHN)	Erfan Moharrami (IRI)	Alizhan Ablagatov (KAZ)

==== 75 kg ====
Games	Gold	Silver	Bronze
2010 Guangzhou	Hamid Reza Gholipour (IRI)	Ijaz Ahmed (PAK)	Jiang Chunpeng (CHN)
2010 Guangzhou	Hamid Reza Gholipour (IRI)	Ijaz Ahmed (PAK)	Magsarjavyn Batjargal (MGL)
2014 Incheon	Kim Myeong-jin (KOR)	Hamid Reza Ladvar (IRI)	Nursultan Tursynkulov (KAZ)
2014 Incheon	Kim Myeong-jin (KOR)	Hamid Reza Ladvar (IRI)	Ngô Văn Sỹ (VIE)
2022 Hangzhou	Yousef Sabri (IRI)	Cai Feilong (MAC)	Nasratullah Habibi (AFG)
2022 Hangzhou	Yousef Sabri (IRI)	Cai Feilong (MAC)	Temirlan Amankulov (KGZ)
2026 Aichi–Nagoya	Soheil Mousavi (IRI)	Abdurashid Abdullayev (KAZ)	Zhang Huan-yi (TPE)
2026 Aichi–Nagoya	Soheil Mousavi (IRI)	Abdurashid Abdullayev (KAZ)	Doniyor Turgunbaev (UZB)

== Women ==
=== Taolu ===
==== Changquan ====
- Changquan & Short weapon (Daoshu or Jianshu) & Long weapon (Gunshu or Qiangshu): 1990–1998
- Changquan & Jianshu & Qiangshu: 2002–2006
- Changquan: 2010–

Games	Gold	Silver	Bronze
1990 Beijing	Wang Ping (CHN)	Peng Ying (CHN)	Ng Siu Ching (HKG)
1994 Hiroshima	Zhuang Hui (CHN)	Momi Matsumura (JPN)	Chiew Hui Yan (SIN)
1998 Bangkok	Liu Qinghua (CHN)	Nguyễn Thúy Hiền (VIE)	Yuri Kaminiwa (JPN)
2002 Busan	Li Ao (CHN)	Han Jing (MAC)	Nguyễn Thị Mỹ Đức (VIE)
2006 Doha	Ma Lingjuan (CHN)	Susyana Tjhan (INA)	Han Jing (MAC)
2010 Guangzhou	Geng Xiaoling (HKG)	Sandi Oo (MYA)	Susyana Tjhan (INA)
2010 Guangzhou	Geng Xiaoling (HKG)	Sandi Oo (MYA)	Yuki Hiraoka (JPN)
2014 Incheon	Kan Wencong (CHN)	Geng Xiaoling (HKG)	Tan Yan Ni (SIN)
2018 Jakarta–Palembang	Qi Xinyi (CHN)	Li Yi (MAC)	Hoàng Thị Phương Giang (VIE)
2022 Hangzhou	Li Yi (MAC)	Liu Xuxu (HKG)	Kimberly Ong (SGP)
2026 Aichi–Nagoya	Lydia Sham (HKG)	Sou Cho Man (MAC)	Eugenia Diva Widodo (INA)

==== Nanquan ====
- Nanquan: 1990–1998
- Nanquan & Nandao & Nangun: 2002–2006
- Nanquan & Nandao: 2010–

Games	Gold	Silver	Bronze
1990 Beijing	Chen Lihong (CHN)	Liang Yanhua (CHN)	Noriko Katsube (JPN)
1994 Hiroshima	Wang Huiling (CHN)	Lei Fei (MAC)	Ng Siu Ching (HKG)
1998 Bangkok	Ng Siu Ching (HKG)	Lei Fei (MAC)	Cho Yu-chiao (TPE)
2002 Busan	Huang Chunni (CHN)	Nguyễn Thị Ngọc Oanh (VIE)	Swe Swe Thant (MYA)
2006 Doha	Mao Yaqi (CHN)	Angie Tsang (HKG)	Diana Bong (MAS)
2010 Guangzhou	Lin Fan (CHN)	Ivana Ardelia Irmanto (INA)	Tai Cheau Xuen (MAS)
2014 Incheon	Juwita Niza Wasni (INA)	Wei Hong (CHN)	Ivana Ardelia Irmanto (INA)
2018 Jakarta–Palembang	Tang Lu (CHN)	Darya Latisheva (UZB)	Yuen Ka Ying (HKG)
2022 Hangzhou	Chen Huiying (CHN)	Tan Cheong Min (MAS)	Darya Latisheva (UZB)
2026 Aichi–Nagoya	Zhang Yaling (CHN)	Darya Latisheva (UZB)	Tan Cheong Min (MAS)

==== Taijiquan ====
- Taijiquan: 1990–1998
- Taijiquan & Taijijian: 2002–

Games	Gold	Silver	Bronze
1990 Beijing	Su Zifang (CHN)	Gao Jiamin (CHN)	Huang Ti-na (TPE)
1994 Hiroshima	Gao Jiamin (CHN)	Naoko Masuda (JPN)	Tan Mui Buay (SIN)
1998 Bangkok	Gao Jiamin (CHN)	Fan Xueping (CHN)	Jainab (INA)
2002 Busan	Khaing Khaing Maw (MYA)	Li Fai (HKG)	Jessie Liew (SIN)
2006 Doha	Chai Fong Ying (MAS)	Ai Miyaoka (JPN)	Ng Shin Yii (MAS)
2010 Guangzhou	Chai Fong Ying (MAS)	Ai Miyaoka (JPN)	Wen Ching-ni (TPE)
2014 Incheon	Yu Mengmeng (CHN)	Lindswell Kwok (INA)	Ai Uchida (JPN)
2018 Jakarta–Palembang	Lindswell Kwok (INA)	Juanita Mok (HKG)	Agatha Wong (PHI)
2022 Hangzhou	Tong Xin (CHN)	Basma Lachkar (BRU)	Chen Suijin (HKG)
2026 Aichi–Nagoya	Tong Xin (CHN)	Shiho Saito (JPN)	Basma Lachkar (BRU)
2026 Aichi–Nagoya	Tong Xin (CHN)	Shiho Saito (JPN)	Zeanne Law (SGP)

==== Jianshu & Qiangshu ====
Games	Gold	Silver	Bronze
2010 Guangzhou	Kan Wencong (CHN)	Zheng Tianhui (HKG)	Lee Wen-jung (TPE)
2014 Incheon	Dương Thúy Vi (VIE)	Li Yi (MAC)	Seo Hee-ju (KOR)
2018 Jakarta–Palembang	Guo Mengjiao (CHN)	Zahra Kiani (IRI)	Dương Thúy Vi (VIE)
2022 Hangzhou	Lai Xiaoxiao (CHN)	Zahra Kiani (IRI)	Dương Thúy Vi (VIE)
2026 Aichi–Nagoya	Yao Yang (CHN)	Nanoha Kida (JPN)	Dương Thúy Vi (VIE)

=== Sanda ===
==== 52 kg ====
Games	Gold	Silver	Bronze
2010 Guangzhou	E Meidie (CHN)	Nguyễn Thị Bích (VIE)	Elaheh Mansourian (IRI)
2010 Guangzhou	E Meidie (CHN)	Nguyễn Thị Bích (VIE)	Lee Jung-hee (KOR)
2014 Incheon	Zhang Luan (CHN)	Elaheh Mansourian (IRI)	Yumnam Sanathoi Devi (IND)
2014 Incheon	Zhang Luan (CHN)	Elaheh Mansourian (IRI)	Kim Hye-bin (KOR)
2018 Jakarta–Palembang	Li Yueyao (CHN)	Elaheh Mansourian (IRI)	Divine Wally (PHI)
2018 Jakarta–Palembang	Li Yueyao (CHN)	Elaheh Mansourian (IRI)	Chen Wei-ting (TPE)
2022 Hangzhou	Li Yueyao (CHN)	Elaheh Mansourian (IRI)	Tharisa Dea Florentina (INA)
2022 Hangzhou	Li Yueyao (CHN)	Elaheh Mansourian (IRI)	Ayan Tursyn (KAZ)
2026 Aichi–Nagoya	Wu Di (CHN)	Sogand Sinkaei (IRI)	Jinnat Akter (BAN)
2026 Aichi–Nagoya	Wu Di (CHN)	Sogand Sinkaei (IRI)	Chan Tsz Ching (HKG)

==== 60 kg ====
Games	Gold	Silver	Bronze
2010 Guangzhou	Khadijeh Azadpour (IRI)	Wangkhem Sandhyarani Devi (IND)	Paloy Barckkham (LAO)
2010 Guangzhou	Khadijeh Azadpour (IRI)	Wangkhem Sandhyarani Devi (IND)	Wu Tzu-yi (TPE)
2014 Incheon	Wang Cong (CHN)	Kao Yu-chuan (TPE)	Jennet Aýnazarowa (TKM)
2014 Incheon	Wang Cong (CHN)	Kao Yu-chuan (TPE)	Tân Thị Ly (VIE)
2018 Jakarta–Palembang	Cai Yingying (CHN)	Shahrbanoo Mansourian (IRI)	Naorem Roshibina Devi (IND)
2018 Jakarta–Palembang	Cai Yingying (CHN)	Shahrbanoo Mansourian (IRI)	Suchaya Bualuang (THA)
2022 Hangzhou	Wu Xiaowei (CHN)	Naorem Roshibina Devi (IND)	Shahrbanoo Mansourian (IRI)
2022 Hangzhou	Wu Xiaowei (CHN)	Naorem Roshibina Devi (IND)	Nguyễn Thị Thu Thuỷ (VIE)
2026 Aichi–Nagoya	Zhang Xiaoyu (CHN)	Naorem Roshibina Devi (IND)	Thania Kusumaningtyas (INA)
2026 Aichi–Nagoya	Zhang Xiaoyu (CHN)	Naorem Roshibina Devi (IND)	Nguyễn Thị Thu Thuỷ (VIE)
