= Wushu at the 1990 Asian Games =

- Venue: Haidian Gymnasium
- Dates: 29 September – 4 October 1990
- Competitors: 96 from 11 nations

Wushu was contested by both men and women at the 1990 Asian Games in Haidian Gymnasium, Beijing, China from September 29 to October 4, 1990. The wushu competition consisted of three events: Changquan, Nanquan and tai chi, for both genders. The changquan combined event consisted of changquan, one long weapon discipline, and one short weapon discipline. The competition attracted 96 competitors from 11 nations.

== Schedule ==
●	Round	●	Last round

Event↓/Date →	29th Sat	30th Sun	1st Mon	2nd Tue	3rd Wed	4th Thu
Men's changquan combined	●		●			●
Men's nanquan			●			
Men's taijiquan		●				
Women's changquan combined			●		●	●
Women's nanquan	●					
Women's taijiquan					●	

== Medalists ==
=== Men ===
Event	Gold	Silver	Bronze
Changquan combined	Yuan Wenqing; China	Liu Zhenling; China	Hai Choi Lam; Hong Kong
Nanquan	He Qiang; China	Leung Yat Ho; Hong Kong	Wong Tong Ieong; Macau
Taijiquan	Chen Sitan; China	Wang Zengxiang; China	Nobutsugu Arai; Japan

=== Women ===
Event	Gold	Silver	Bronze
Changquan combined	Wang Ping; China	Peng Ying; China	Ng Siu Ching; Hong Kong
Nanquan	Chen Lihong; China	Liang Yanhua; China	Noriko Katsube; Japan
Taijiquan	Su Zifang; China	Gao Jiamin; China	Huang Ti-na; Chinese Taipei

== Medal table ==
Rank	Nation	Gold	Silver	Bronze	Total
1	China (CHN)	6	5	0	11
2	Hong Kong (HKG)	0	1	2	3
3	Japan (JPN)	0	0	2	2
4	Chinese Taipei (TPE)	0	0	1	1
4	Macau (MAC)	0	0	1	1
Totals (5 entries)		6	6	6	18

== Participating nations ==
A total of 96 athletes from 11 nations competed in wushu at the 1990 Asian Games:

- China (12)
- Chinese Taipei
- Hong Kong (9)
- Japan (12)
- Macau
- Malaysia (6)
- Nepal
- Philippines
- Singapore
- South Korea
- Vietnam
