= Wushu at the 1993 East Asian Games =

- Dates: May 14-16, 1993

Wushu was contested by both men and women at the 1993 East Asian Games in Shanghai, China from May 14 to 16, 1993. China won gold in five of the six events organized, with Japan bagging the sixth gold.

== Medal table ==
Rank	Nation	Gold	Silver	Bronze	Total
1	China (CHN)	5	1	1	7
2	Japan (JPN)	1	2	0	3
3	Hong Kong (HKG)	0	2	2	4
4	Chinese Taipei (TPE)	0	1	1	2
5	South Korea (KOR)	0	0	2	2
6	Macau (MAC)	0	0	1	1
Totals (6 entries)		6	6	7	19

== Medalists ==
=== Men ===
Event	Gold	Silver	Bronze
Changquan; 3-event all-around	He Jun; China	Liu Haibo; China	Park Chan-dae; South Korea
Nanquan	Ka Li; China	Leung Yat Ho; Hong Kong	Lee Soung-soo; South Korea
Taijiquan	Masaru Masuda; Japan	Chan Ming-shu; Chinese Taipei	Su Dong; China

=== Women ===
Event	Gold	Silver	Bronze
Changquan; 3-event all-around	Liu Shuhong; China	Ng Siu Ching; Hong Kong	Li Fai; Hong Kong
Nanquan	Han Jing; China	Noriko Katsube; Japan	Ng Siu Ching; Hong Kong Zhuo Yuque; Chinese Taipei
Taijiquan	Gao Jiamin; China	Naoko Masuda; Japan	Sam Pou Wa; Macau
