= Election of the Top 100 Chinese Martial Artists =

The Election of the Top 100 Chinese Wushu Masters (Chinese: “中华武林百杰”评选活动; pinyin: “Zhōnghuá wǔlín bǎi jié” píngxuǎn huódòng) was a selection event hosted by the Chinese Wushu Association and the Wushu Research Institute of the General Administration of Sport of China to celebrate some of the most renowned figures in the sport of wushu.

In August 1993, the Chinese Wushu Association announced the launch of the "100 Chinese Wushu Masters" selection campaign. The selection was held in Beijing from July 20 to 26, 1994. The results were announced in Laiyang, Shandong from December 18 to 20, 1995.

== List of candidates ==
=== Chinese martial arts masters ===
- Feng Zhiqiang
- Li Shixin
- Li Bingci
- Li Deyin
- Chen Jiazhen
- Yuan Jingquan
- Liu Wanfu
- Li Wenzhen
- Lang Rongbiao
- Liu Shulai
- Liu Hongyan
- Chen Fengqi
- Zhang Xigui
- Yang Zhenyi
- Wang Yafei
- Wu Bingxiao
- Liu Youzhen
- Liu Qinghua
- Ji Jiuru
- Xu Qicheng
- Zhao Linyan
- Gao Zhengyi
- Kang Shaoyuan
- Han Mingnan
- Yu Liguang
- Li Chengxiang
- Ma Yueliang
- Li Fumei
- Fu Zhongwen
- Wang Jinbao
- Fei Yuxia
- Peng Guanzhou
- Li Qingshan
- Chen Bangda
- Chen Shunan
- Liu Xuezhi
- Yang Rentao
- Guo Shengju
- Xu Shuzhen
- Xu Jinmin
- Chen Sitan
- Hong Zhengfu
- Chen Chunming
- Wang Shouyi
- Wang Xinquan
- Niu Huailu
- Gao Huanbo
- Xu Guilin
- Bu Wende
- Ma Chunxi
- Gu Youyi
- Zhuang Hansheng
- Yang Yong
- Guo Xiaoquan
- Yuan Linlin
- Li Dezhi
- Yang Dubin
- Yan Xizheng
- Qin Keguo
- Chen Daoyun
- Liang Yanhua
- Huang Jiangang
- Dong Deqiang
- Zhao Yuchang
- Ren Gang
- Liu Taifu
- Li Yili
- Hong Zhiping
- Ren Jihua
- Su Zifang
- Ma Zhenbang
- Zhang Tong
- Xu Yuchen
- Li Shuhong
- Zhang Hongmou
- Hao Xinlian
- Li Xiaoping
- Jiang Hongyan
- Ye Guofu
- Fang Ruji
- Zhu Ruiqi
- Zhang Guangde
- Xu Weijun
- Guo Zhiyu
- Jiang Bailong
- Wen Li
- Zeng Yujiu
- Bai Hongshun
- Wang Shutian
- Xiao Yingpeng
- Zhang Xuanhui
- Peng Ying
- Guan Tieyun
- Mu Xiujie
- Gao Meijian
- Jia Weitao
- Mao Bohao
- Wu Jiangping
- Zhang Shan

=== Top-ten wushu professors ===
- Men Huifeng
- Ma Xianda
- Xi Yuntai
- Wang Peikun
- Liu Yuhua
- Qiu Pixiang
- Zhang Wenguang
- Chen Shengpu
- Xia Baihua
- Cai Longyun

=== Top-ten wushu masters ===
- Qu Hanquan
- Sun Jianyun
- Li Wenbin
- Li Tianji
- Zhang Jixiu
- Chen Zhenglei
- Zhao Ziqiu
- Guo Ruixiang
- Liang Yiquan
- Cai Hongxiang

=== Top-ten wushu coaches ===
- Wang Changkai
- Wu Bin
- Deng Changli
- He Fusheng
- Chen Changmin
- Shao Shankang
- Pang Lintai
- Zhou Yongfu
- Qian Yuanze
- Zeng Nailiang

=== Top-ten wushu athletes ===
- Wang Ping
- Wang Erping
- Wang Shiying
- Jet Li
- He Qiang
- Zhang Yuping
- Zhao Changjun
- Gao Jiamin
- Yuan Wenqing
- Han Zhicheng
