= Song Chi Kuan =

Macau wushu practitioner

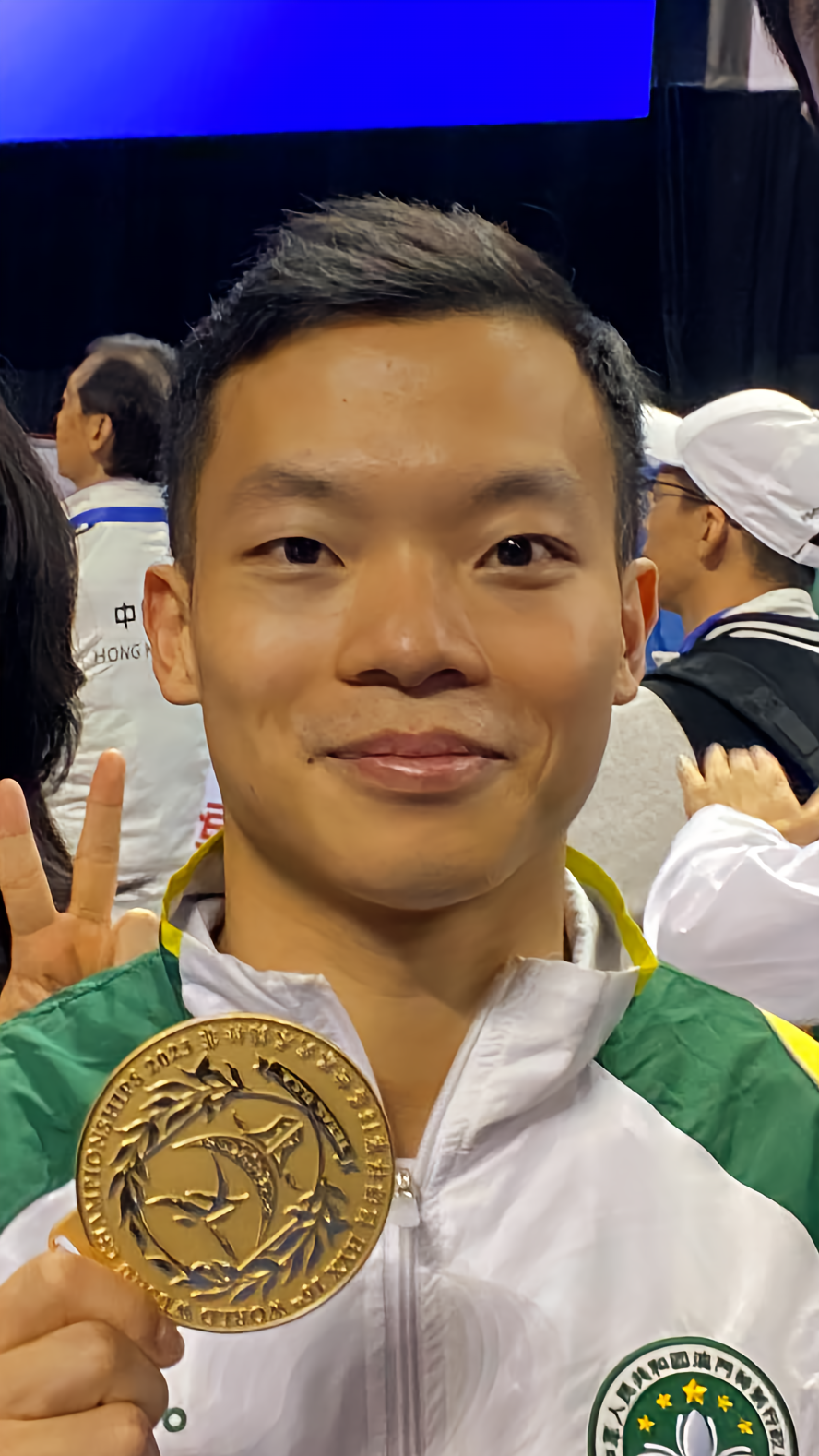

Personal information
- Born: 23 December 1997 (age 28)

Sport
- Sport: Wushu
- Events: Changquan, Jianshu, Qiangshu
- Team: Macau Wushu Team
Medal record
Representing Macau
Men's Wushu Taolu
World Championships
Gold medal – first place	2023 Fort Worth	Jianshu
Bronze medal – third place	2019 Shanghai	Jianshu
Bronze medal – third place	2019 Shanghai	Qiangshu
World Cup
Gold medal – first place	2024 Yokohama	Changquan
Silver medal – second place	2026 Haikou	Changquan
Bronze medal – third place	2018 Yangon	Changquan
Asian Games
Silver medal – second place	2026 Aichi–Nagoya	Changquan
Bronze medal – third place	2022 Hangzhou	Changquan

Song Chi Kuan (Chinese: 宋子君; pinyin: Sòngzijūn; born 23 December 1997) is a professional wushu taolu athlete from Macau.

== Career ==
=== Junior ===
Song originally practiced gymnastics as a kid and later started learning wushu around the age of nine. At the age of fourteen, he made his international debut at the 2012 Asian Wushu Championships in Hanoi.

=== Senior ===
Song made his senior debut at the 2015 World Wushu Championships in Jakarta. Despite placing under the top-8 in his events, he still was invited to compete in the 2016 Taolu World Cup in Fuzhou. After competing in the 2017 World Wushu Championships in Kazan, he finished fourth in men's changquan at the 2018 Asian Games. Shortly after, he won a bronze medal in changquan at the 2018 Taolu World Cup in Yangon. A year later at the 2019 World Wushu Championships in Shanghai, he won bronze medals in jianshu and qiangshu.

In July 2023, Song went to train in Gansu under Chang Zhizhao. Two months later, he won the bronze medal in men's changquan at the Asian Games that year. A few months later, he competed in the 2023 World Wushu Championships where he became the world champion in men's jianshu. He then won the gold medal in changquan at the 2024 Taolu World Cup. After a string of international losses, he won the silver medal in changquan at the 2026 Taolu World Cup.

== Competitive history ==
Year	Event	CQ	JS	QS
Junior
2012	Asian Championships	?	?	?
Senior
2015	World Championships	12	14	9
2016	World Cup	6	7	4
2017	World Championships	13	8	12
2018	Asian Games	4		
2018	World Cup	3rd place, bronze medalist(s)	7	
2019	World Championships	33	3rd place, bronze medalist(s)	3rd place, bronze medalist(s)
2020	did not compete due to COVID-19 pandemic			
2023	Asian Games	3rd place, bronze medalist(s)		
2023	World Championships	12	1st place, gold medalist(s)	14
2024	World Cup	1st place, gold medalist(s)		
2026	World Cup		2nd place, silver medalist(s)	

== Honours ==
Awarded by the SAR of Macau:

- Honourific Title of Merit: 2024

== See also ==
- List of Asian Games medalists in wushu
