= Yousef Sabri (disambiguation) =

Yousef Sabri may refer to:

- Youcef Sabri Medel (born 1996), Algerian badminton player
- Yousef Sabri (born 1998), Iranian wushu practitioner
- Youssef Sabri Abu Taleb (1929–2008), Egyptian military and political
