= Chan Ming-shu =

Taiwanese wushu practitioner

Personal information
- Born: September 25, 1975 (age 50) Taiwan
- Height: 172 cm (5 ft 8 in)
- Weight: 59 kg (130 lb)

Sport
- Sport: Wushu
- Event(s): Taijiquan, Taijijian
Medal record
Representing Chinese Taipei
Men's Wushu Taolu
World Championships
Silver medal – second place	1997 Rome	Taijiquan
Asian Games
Gold medal – first place	1998 Bangkok	Taijiquan
Silver medal – second place	1994 Hiroshima	Taijiquan
Silver medal – second place	2002 Busan	Taijiquan
Asian Championships
Gold medal – first place	2000 Hanoi	TJQ All-around
Silver medal – second place	1996 Manila	Taijiquan
Silver medal – second place	2000 Hanoi	Taijiquan
Silver medal – second place	2000 Hanoi	Taijijian
East Asian Games
Gold medal – first place	1997 Busan	Taijiquan
Silver medal – second place	1993 Shanghai	Taijiquan
Silver medal – second place	2001 Osaka	Taijiquan

Chan Ming-shu (Chinese: 詹明樹; pinyin: Zhān míngshù; born September 25, 1975) is a retired taijiquan athlete from Taiwan.

== Career ==
Chan started practicing wushu at the age of ten under his uncle, Chan Te-sheng. in 1989, with the announcement that wushu would be included at the Asian Games, Chan Ming-shu was persuaded by his uncle to switch to taijiquan. His international debut was a year later at the 1990 Asian Games where he finished fifth in men's taijiquan. Three years later, he won his first medal in international competition at the 1993 East Asian Games. He then won another silver medal in men's taijiquan at the 1994 Asian Games. Two years later, he won the silver medal in taijquan at the 1996 Asian Wushu Championships. The following year, he won the gold medal in taijiquan at the 1997 East Asian Games, followed by a silver medal at the 1997 World Wushu Championships. A year later, he won the gold medal in men's taijiquan at the 1998 Asian Games. Two years later he won two silver medals in taijiquan and taijijian at the 2000 Asian Wushu Championships, thus winning the taijiquan all-around gold medal. The following year, he won the silver medal in taijiquan at the 2001 East Asian Games. His last competition was at the 2002 Asian Games where he won the silver medal in men's taijiquan.

From 1993 to 2001, Chan consecutively won the Taiwan taijiquan national championship eight times.

== See also ==
- List of Asian Games medalists in wushu
