= Khadijeh Azadpour =

Iranian wushu athlete

Personal information
- Native name: خدیجه آزادپور
- Full name: Khadijeh Azadpour
- Nickname: First Iranian Female Gold Medalist
- Nationality: Iranian
- Born: Bagh-e Bahadoran, Isfahan, Iran
- Years active: 2009- present
- Weight: 60 kg (132 lb) - 70 kg
- Website: Official Instagram Profile

Sport
- Sport: Wushu
Medal record
World Championships
Gold medal – first place	2009 Toronto	65 kg
Gold medal – first place	2010 Shanghai	65 kg
Asian Games
Gold medal – first place	2010 Guangzhou	60 kg

Khadijeh Azadpour (Persian: خدیجه آزادپور) is an Iranian wushu athlete and World championship Gold medal (2009, 2010) and Asian Games Gold medal 2010.

== Honours ==
=== National ===
- Sanda World Cup
  - Gold: 2009, Toronto
  - Gold: 2010, Shanghai
- Sanda Asian Games
  - Gold: 2010, Guangzhou

=== Personal ===
- Iranian Women's Wushu League (Stars Cup)
  - 1st place: 2008
  - 1st place: 2009

== Wushu at the 2010 Asian Games ==
In Wushu at the 2010 Asian Games – Women's sanda 60 kg Khadijeh Azadpour from Iran won the gold medal after beating W. Sandhyarani Devi of India in gold medal bout 2–0. Azadpour became the first Iranian female to win an Asian Games gold medal in an individual event.
