= 1996 Asian Wushu Championships =

4th edition of the Asian Wushu Championships

- Venue: Ninoy Aquino Stadium (capacity: 6,000)
- Location: Manila, Philippines
- Start date: November 13, 1996
- End date: November 16, 1996

The 1996 Asian Wushu Championships was the 4th edition of the Asian Wushu Championships. It was held at the Ninoy Aquino Stadium in Manila, Philippines from November 13-16, 1996. It was one of the first wushu competitions to use computerized scoring and also the first time Sanda appeared as an official sport and taijiquan as an official event at the Asian Wushu Championships.

President of the Philippines, Fidel V. Ramos, declared November 1996 as the Asian Wushu Championships month as a decree of Proclamation No. 897 signed on October 9, 1996.

== Medal table ==
Taolu and Sanda

* Host nation (Philippines)

Rank	Nation	Gold	Silver	Bronze	Total
1	China (CHN)	11	0	0	11
2	Philippines*	5	0	0	5
3	Japan (JPN)	2	1	3	6
4	Malaysia (MAS)	2	0	1	3
5	Iran (IRI)	2	0	0	2
6	Vietnam (VIE)	1	1	2	4
7	Chinese Taipei (TPE)	1	1	0	2
7	Hong Kong	1	1	0	2
9	Singapore (SGP)	1	0	4	5
10	South Korea (KOR)	1	0	0	1
10	Thailand (THA)	1	0	0	1
12	Myanmar	0	6	1	7
Totals (12 entries)		28	10	11	49

== Medalists ==
=== Taolu ===
==== Men's events ====
Event	Gold	Silver	Bronze
Changquan	Wu Gang; China	unknown	unknown
Daoshu	unknown China	unknown	unknown
Gunshu	Alfonso Que; Philippines	unknown	unknown
Jianshu	Lester Pimentel; Philippines	unknown	unknown
Qiangshu	Alfonso Que; Philippines	unknown	unknown
Nanquan	Wu Xianju; China; Picasso Tan; Singapore	Shared Gold	Ho Ro Bin; Malaysia
Taijiquan	Kong Xiangdong; China	Chan Ming-shu; Chinese Taipei	unknown
Taijijian	unknown	unknown	unknown

==== Women's events ====
Event	Gold	Silver	Bronze
Changquan	Liu Qinghua; China	Nguyễn Thúy Hiền; Vietnam	Yuri Kaminiwa; Japan
Daoshu	Nguyễn Thúy Hiền; Vietnam	unknown	Nguyễn Thị Ngọc Oanh; Vietnam
Gunshu	unknown	unknown	Munehisa Takayama; Japan
Jianshu	Ng Siu Ching; Hong Kong	Yuri Kaminiwa; Japan	Chiew Hui Yan; Singapore
Qiangshu	Stephanie Lorraine Lim; Philippines	unknown	Yuri Kaminiwa; Japan
Nanquan	unknown	Ng Siu Ching; Hong Kong	Nguyễn Thị Ngọc Oanh; Vietnam
Taijiquan	unknown	unknown	Tan Mui Buay; Singapore
Taijijian	unknown	unknown	Tan Mui Buay; Singapore
