= Wushu at the 2010 Asian Games – Women's sanshou 60 kg =

Women's sanshou 60 kg at the 2010 Asian Games
- Venue: Nansha Gymnasium
- Dates: 13–17 November 2010
- Competitors: 12 from 12 nations

Medalists
gold medal	Khadijeh Azadpour	Iran
silver medal	Wangkhem Sandhyarani Devi	India
bronze medal	Wu Tzu-yi	Chinese Taipei
bronze medal	Paloy Barckkham	Laos

The women's sanshou 60 kilograms competition at the 2010 Asian Games in Guangzhou, China was held from 13 November to 17 November at the Nansha Gymnasium.

A total of twelve competitors from twelve countries competed in this event, limited to fighters whose body weight was less than 60 kilograms.

Khadijeh Azadpour from Iran won the gold medal after beating Wangkhem Sandhyarani Devi of India in gold medal bout 2–0. The bronze medal was shared by Wu Tzu-yi from Chinese Taipei and Paloy Barckkham of Laos. Azadpour became the first Iranian female to win an Asian Games gold medal in an individual event.

Athletes from Afghanistan (Suraya Salahshuor), Vietnam (Tân Thị Ly), Nepal (Jharana Gurung) and Indonesia (Moria Manalu) shared the fifth place altogether.

== Schedule ==
All times are China Standard Time (UTC+08:00)

Date	Time	Event
Saturday, 13 November 2010	19:30	Round of 16
Monday, 15 November 2010	19:30	Quarterfinals
Tuesday, 16 November 2010	19:30	Semifinals
Wednesday, 17 November 2010	19:30	Final

== Results ==
Legend

- AV — Absolute victory

Round of 16
Wu Tzu-yi (TPE)	2
Mariane Mariano (PHI)	1
Khadijeh Azadpour (IRI)	2
Noh Gyeong-mi (KOR)	0
Weiam Al-Hunaishi (YEM)
Moria Manalu (INA)	AV
Mst Basona Khandokar (BAN)	0
Jharana Gurung (NEP)	2

Quarterfinals
Suraya Salahshuor (AFG)	0
Wu Tzu-yi (TPE)	2
Khadijeh Azadpour (IRI)	2
Tân Thị Ly (VIE)	0
Wangkhem Sandhyarani Devi (IND)	2
Moria Manalu (INA)	0
Jharana Gurung (NEP)	0
Paloy Barckkham (LAO)	2

Semifinals
Wu Tzu-yi (TPE)	0
Khadijeh Azadpour (IRI)	2
Wangkhem Sandhyarani Devi (IND)	2
Paloy Barckkham (LAO)	0

Final
Khadijeh Azadpour (IRI)	2
Wangkhem Sandhyarani Devi (IND)	0
