= Ho Ro Bin =

Malaysian wushu practitioner

Personal information
- Born: 1974 (age 51–52) Penang, Malaysia
- Occupations: Martial artist, athlete

Sport
- Sport: Wushu
- Events: Nanquan, Nandao, Nangun
- Team: Malaysia Wushu Team
Medal record
Men's Wushu Taolu
Representing Malaysia
World Championships
Gold medal – first place	1999 Hong Kong	Nandao
Gold medal – first place	2005 Hanoi	Nandao
Silver medal – second place	2003 Macau	Nanquan
Bronze medal – third place	2003 Macau	Nangun
Asian Games
Gold medal – first place	2002 Busan	Nanquan
Bronze medal – third place	1998 Bangkok	Nanquan
Asian Championships
Gold medal – first place	2004 Yangon	Nandao
Silver medal – second place	2004 Yangon	Nanquan
Bronze medal – third place	1996 Manila	Nanquan
SEA Games
Gold medal – first place	2001 Kuala Lumpur	Nanquan
Gold medal – first place	2001 Kuala Lumpur	Nandao+Nangun
Gold medal – first place	2003 Hanoi	Nanquan
Silver medal – second place	1997 Jakarta	Qiangshu
Silver medal – second place	2003 Hanoi	Nandao
Silver medal – second place	2005 Manila	Nanquan
Bronze medal – third place	1997 Jakarta	Nanquan

Ho Ro Bin (Chinese: 何諾賓; pinyin: hé nuò bīn) is a retired competitive wushu taolu athlete and actor from Malaysia. He is the first Malaysian athlete who have won gold medals in all major international wushu competitions including the World Wushu Championships, Asian Games, Asian Wushu Championships, and the SEA Games.

== Career ==
Born in Penang, Ho started wushu at the age of 12 under Chiong Ah Chaw. At the age of 18, he moved to Kuala Lumpur to train under Chin Hoong Yip and joined the first full-time Malaysian Wushu Team in 2000.

Ho's international debut was at the 1996 Asian Wushu Championships where he won the bronze medal in nanquan. A year later, he competed in the 1997 SEA Games and won a silver medal in qiangshu and a bronze medal in nanquan. At the 1998 Asian Games, he won a bronze medal in men's nanquan as part of a three-way tie. He then competed in the 1999 World Wushu Championships where he became the first world champion in nandao. Ahead of the 2001 SEA Games in Kuala Lumpur, Ho considered retiring from wushu and becoming a coach. At the event, he won gold medals in nanquan and nandao/nangun combined and thus withdrew his retirement plans.

A year later, Ho won the gold medal in men's nanquan at the 2002 Asian Games. He was then voted to be Olympian of the Year by the Olympic Council of Malaysia. At the 2003 World Wushu Championships, Ho won the silver medal in nanquan and the bronze medal in nangun. He then won the gold medal in nandao and the silver medal in nanquan at the 2004 Asian Wushu Championships. A year later, Ho competed in the 2005 SEA Games and won the silver medal in nanquan. His last major competition was then at the 2005 World Wushu Championships where he was once again the world champion in nandao.

In 2006, Ho announced his retirement from competitive wushu. The following year, he starred in Kinta 1881 which is viewed as Malaysia's first martial arts film. He also opened his own wushu school, the Ho Ro Bin Wushu Centre.

== See also ==
- List of Asian Games medalists in wushu
