= 1993 World Wushu Championships =

2nd edition of the World Wushu Championships

- Venue: Stadium Negara (capacity: 10,000)
- Location: Kuala Lumpur, Malaysia
- Start date: November 21, 1993
- End date: November 27, 1993
- Competitors: 500 from 34 nations

The 1993 World Wushu Championships was the 2nd edition of the World Wushu Championships. It was held at the Stadium Negara in Kuala Lumpur, Malaysia from November 21 to November 27, 1993. For the countries in Asia, this was the qualifying event for the 1994 Asian Games.

== Medal table ==
* Host nation (Malaysia)

Rank	NOC	Gold	Silver	Bronze	Total
1	China	11	1	0	12
2	Russia	3	0	1	4
3	Hong Kong	2	3	4	9
4	Vietnam	2	1	1	4
5	Turkmenistan	2	1	0	3
6	Malaysia*	1	5	1	7
7	Japan	1	1	3	5
8	Philippines	1	1	2	4
9	South Korea	1	0	4	5
10	Singapore	0	2	3	5
11	Spain	0	2	0	2
12	Egypt	0	1	2	3
13	Azerbaijan	0	1	1	2
13	Brazil	0	1	1	2
13	Italy	0	1	1	2
13	Ukraine	0	1	1	2
17	Kazakhstan	0	1	0	1
17	Sweden	0	1	0	1
19	Belgium	0	0	2	2
19	Great Britain	0	0	2	2
21	Chinese Taipei	0	0	1	1
21	France	0	0	1	1
21	Macau	0	0	1	1
21	Netherlands	0	0	1	1
21	Poland	0	0	1	1
21	Tajikistan	0	0	1	1
Totals (26 entries)		24	24	35	83

== Medalists ==
=== Men's taolu ===
Event	Gold	Silver	Bronze
Changquan	Di Guangwen; China	Choy Yeen Onn; Malaysia	Park Chan-dae; South Korea
Daoshu	Yuan Wenqing; China	Chow Kam Onn; Malaysia	Park Chan-dae; South Korea
Gunshu	Park Chan-dae; South Korea	Vincent Ng; Singapore	Hiroshi Yoshida; Japan
Jianshu	Choy Yeen Onn; Malaysia	Samson Co; Philippines	Vincent Ng; Singapore
Qiangshu	Samson Co; Philippines	Phoon Chee Kong; Malaysia	Sae Tem Sa Art; Macau
Nanquan	He Qiang; China	Phoon Chee Kong; Malaysia	Leung Yat Ho; Hong Kong
Taijiquan	Chen Sitan; China	Masaru Masuda; Japan	Han Gyeong-su; South Korea

=== Women's taolu ===
Event	Gold	Silver	Bronze
Changquan	Li Fai; Hong Kong	Nguyễn Thúy Hiền; Vietnam	Momi Matsumura; Japan
Daoshu	Nguyễn Thúy Hiền; Vietnam	Tsui Lim Chi; Hong Kong	Catherine Hau; Philippines
Gunshu	Li Fai; Hong Kong	Ng Choo Bee; Malaysia	Tsui Lim Chi; Hong Kong
Gunshu	Li Fai; Hong Kong	Ng Choo Bee; Malaysia	Jennifer Yeo; Philippines
Jianshu	Liu Qinghua; China	Ng Siu Ching; Hong Kong	Li Fai; Hong Kong
Qiangshu	Wei Dantong; China	Chiew Hui Yan; Singapore	Ng Siu Ching; Hong Kong
Nanquan	Liang Yanhua; China	Ng Siu Ching; Hong Kong	Noriko Katsube; Japan
Taijiquan	Naoko Masuda; Japan	Xue Qiong; China	Lan Hsiao-chien; Chinese Taipei

=== Men's sanda ===
Event	Gold	Silver	Bronze
52 kg	Wang Shiying; China	Saken Abubakirov; Kazakhstan	Heng Puay Hock; Singapore
52 kg	Wang Shiying; China	Saken Abubakirov; Kazakhstan	Vũ Văn Thường; Vietnam
56 kg	Mai Thanh Ba; Vietnam	José Domínguez; Spain	You Kie-sung; South Korea
56 kg	Mai Thanh Ba; Vietnam	José Domínguez; Spain	Manuel Vasconcellos; Brazil
60 kg	Zeng Qingfeng; China	Gennadiý Orlowskiý; Turkmenistan	Ruslan Matiev; Russia
60 kg	Zeng Qingfeng; China	Gennadiý Orlowskiý; Turkmenistan	Tan Cheng Tiong; Singapore
65 kg	Feng Kuang; China	Jon Nyberg; Sweden	Roberto Boschi; Italy
65 kg	Feng Kuang; China	Jon Nyberg; Sweden	Richard Hamilton; Great Britain
70 kg	Wu Wenjun; China	Achmedov; Ukraine	Mahmoud Maslsal; Egypt
70 kg	Wu Wenjun; China	Achmedov; Ukraine	Magomedov; Azerbaijan
75 kg	Magomed Gitinov; Russia	José Bendarrain; Spain	S. Sivaneswaran; Malaysia
75 kg	Magomed Gitinov; Russia	José Bendarrain; Spain	Micah Hudson; Great Britain
80 kg	Ramazan Ramazanow; Turkmenistan	El-Hussiny; Egypt	Magomed Rasulov; Ukraine
80 kg	Ramazan Ramazanow; Turkmenistan	El-Hussiny; Egypt	Rachid Bekkar; Belgium
85 kg	Zahir Haýdarbekow; Turkmenistan	Stefano Ricci; Italy	Wojciech Kain; Poland
85 kg	Zahir Haýdarbekow; Turkmenistan	Stefano Ricci; Italy	Mohamed El-Sakaa; Egypt
90 kg	Kazbek Zhaparov; Russia	Espedito Silva; Brazil	Wim Demeere; Belgium
90 kg	Kazbek Zhaparov; Russia	Espedito Silva; Brazil	Christophe Grandjean; France
+90 kg	Imamudin Shamilov; Russia	Omar Tagirov; Azerbaijan	Juan Knoppel; Netherlands
+90 kg	Imamudin Shamilov; Russia	Omar Tagirov; Azerbaijan	Bimourzin; Tajikistan
