= Wushu at the 1994 Asian Games – Men's nanquan =

Men's nanquan at the 1994 Asian Games
- Venue: Aki Ward Sports Center
- Dates: 13 October
- Competitors: 16 from 13 nations

Medalists
gold medal	He Qiang	China
silver medal	Leung Yat Ho	Hong Kong
bronze medal	Phoon Chee Kong	Malaysia
bronze medal	Richard Ng	Philippines
bronze medal	Lee Chun-hui	Chinese Taipei

The men's nanquan competition at the 1994 Asian Games in Hiroshima, Japan was held on 13 October at Aki Ward Sports Center.

== Schedule ==
All times are Japan Standard Time (UTC+09:00)

Date	Time	Event
Thursday, 13 October 1994	14:30	Final

== Results ==
Legend

- DNS — Did not start

Rank	Athlete	Score
1st place, gold medalist(s)	He Qiang (CHN)	9.73
2nd place, silver medalist(s)	Leung Yat Ho (HKG)	9.61
3rd place, bronze medalist(s)	Phoon Chee Kong (MAS)	9.53
3rd place, bronze medalist(s)	Richard Ng (PHI)	9.53
3rd place, bronze medalist(s)	Lee Chun-hui (TPE)	9.53
6	Yuji Hirai (JPN)	9.50
7	Picasso Tan (SIN)	9.50
8	Lee Soung-soo (KOR)	9.48
9	Choi Chun Hung (HKG)	9.45
10	Tsogtbaataryn Tögöldör (MGL)	9.31
11	Wong Si Long (MAC)	9.30
12	Krishna Syangbo Tamang (NEP)	9.25
13	Farkhat Amankulov (KAZ)	9.16
—	Lang Rongbiao (CHN)	DNS
—	Viktor Kim (KAZ)	DNS
—	Vladimir Gasanbekov (UZB)	DNS
