= Masaru Masuda =

Japanese wushu practitioner

Sport
- Sport: Wushu
- Event: Taijiquan
Medal record
Representing Japan
Men's Wushu Taolu
World Championships
Silver medal – second place	1993 Kuala Lumpur	Taijiquan
Asian Games
Gold medal – first place	1994 Hiroshima	Taijiquan
East Asian Games
Gold medal – first place	1993 Shanghai	Taijiquan

Masaru Masuda (増田勝) is a former taijiquan athlete from Japan. He won gold medals at the 1993 East Asian Games and the 1994 Asian Games, being the first Japanese wushu athlete to do so at each respective multi-sport event. He also won a silver medal in taijiquan at the 1993 World Wushu Championships in Kuala Lumpur, Malaysia. Since his competitive career, he assumed a position at Waseda University and has published works on taijiquan.

== See also ==
- List of Asian Games medalists in wushu
