= Nguyễn Mạnh Quyền =

Vietnamese wushu practitioner

Sport
- Sport: Wushu
- Events: Changquan Daoshu, Gunshu
- Team: Vietnam Wushu Team
Medal record
Representing Vietnam
Men's Wushu Taolu
World Championships
Silver medal – second place	2011 Ankara	Gunshu
Bronze medal – third place	2011 Ankara	Duilian
Bronze medal – third place	2015 Jakarta	Daoshu
Asian Games
Bronze medal – third place	2010 Guangzhou	Daoshu+Gunshu
Bronze medal – third place	2014 Incheon	Daoshu+Gunshu
Asian Championships
Gold medal – first place	2012 Ho Chi Minh City	Gunshu
Bronze medal – third place	2012 Ho Chi Minh City	Changquan
Southeast Asian Games
Silver medal – second place	2011 Jakarta	Daoshu+Gunshu
Silver medal – second place	2013 Naypyidaw	Daoshu
Bronze medal – third place	2015 Singapore	Daoshu

Nguyễn Mạnh Quyền is a former wushu taolu athlete from Vietnam. He is a triple-medalist at the World Wushu Championships and at the Southeast Asian Games. He is also a double-medalist at the Asian Games in the men's daoshu and gunshu event. In 2012, he was the Asian Champion in gunshu.

== See also ==
- List of Asian Games medalists in wushu
