= Wushu at the 1994 Asian Games – Women's nanquan =

Women's nanquan at the 1994 Asian Games
- Venue: Aki Ward Sports Center
- Dates: 13 October 1994
- Competitors: 13 from 12 nations

Medalists
gold medal	Wang Huiling	China
silver medal	Lei Fei	Macau
bronze medal	Ng Siu Ching	Hong Kong

The women's nanquan competition at the 1994 Asian Games in Hiroshima, Japan was held on 13 October at the Aki Ward Sports Center.

== Schedule ==
All times are Japan Standard Time (UTC+09:00)

Date	Time	Event
Thursday, 13 October 1994	13:00	Final

== Results ==
Legend

- DNS — Did not start

Rank	Athlete	Score
1st place, gold medalist(s)	Wang Huiling (CHN)	9.68
2nd place, silver medalist(s)	Lei Fei (MAC)	9.60
3rd place, bronze medalist(s)	Ng Siu Ching (HKG)	9.50
4	Noriko Katsube (JPN)	9.48
5	Kim Ahn-soon (KOR)	9.46
6	Cho Yu-chiao (TPE)	9.45
7	Ng Choo Bee (MAS)	9.41
7	Nguyễn Phương Lan (VIE)	9.41
9	Bina Khadka (NEP)	9.40
10	Tan Sock Ching (SIN)	9.35
11	Trần Hoài Thu (VIE)	9.25
12	Batchuluuny Ariuntuyaa (MGL)	9.21
—	Elmira Kudabayeva (KAZ)	DNS
