= Gao Jiamin =

Chinese wushu practitioner

Personal information
- Nickname: 太极女皇 "Queen of Taiji"
- Citizenship: American (2000–present)
- Born: June 26, 1966 (age 60) Fuzhou, Fujian, China
- Education: Shanghai University of Sport
- Occupations: Martial artist, athlete, coach
- Years active: 1974–present
- Spouse: Yu Shaowen

Sport
- Sport: Wushu
- Events: Taijiquan, Taijijian
- Team: Fujian Wushu Team
- Coached by: Zeng Nai Liang
- Retired: 1999
Medal record
Representing China
Women's Wushu Taolu
World Championships
Gold medal – first place	1991 Beijing	Taijiquan
Asian Games
Gold medal – first place	1994 Hiroshima	Taijiquan
Gold medal – first place	1998 Bangkok	Taijiquan
Silver medal – second place	1990 Beijing	Taijiquan
Asian Championships
Gold medal – first place	1992 Seoul	Taijiquan
East Asian Games
Gold medal – first place	1993 Shanghai	Taijiquan

Gao Jiamin (Chinese: 高佳敏; pinyin: Gāo Jiāmǐn; born June 26, 1966) is a retired professional wushu taolu athlete and taijiquan practitioner originally from China. She achieved an impressive competitive career throughout the 1990s and became known as the "Queen of Taiji". Gao has won 32 gold medals in a variety of competitions including the World Wushu Championships, Asian Games, East Asian Games, National Games of China, and various other international and national competitions.

== Career ==
=== Early career ===
Gao began practicing wushu at the age of eight. In 1977, she was selected to train with the Fujian Wushu team and began to specialize in taijiquan under Zeng Nai Liang.

=== Competitive years: 1990–1997 ===
Gao's first major international appearance was at the 1990 Asian Games in Beijing, China, where she won the silver medal in women's taijiquan. A year later, she competed at the 1991 World Wushu Championships also held in Beijing, and became the first world champion in women's taijiquan. She then won a gold medal at the 1992 Asian Wushu Championships in Seoul, South Korea. A year later, Gao won the women's taijiquan gold medal at the 1993 East Asian Games in Shanghai, China. Following this, she became a member of the sports committee of the 8th Chinese People's Political Consultative Conference from 1993 to 1998.

At the 1994 Asian Games in Hiroshima, Japan, Gao won the gold medal in women's taijiquan. A year later, Gao competed in the 1998 Asian Games in Bangkok, Thailand, and won once again in women's taijiquan. In 1999, she announced her retirement from competition.

As of the 2018 Asian Games, she is the most prolific wushu athlete at the Asian Games, having won three medals with two of them being gold.

=== Post-retirement ===
After her competitive career, Gao became a deputy of Fujian Province in the 9th National People's Congress. She also became the Vice President of the Fujian Wushu Team and an advisor of the Macau Wushu Team. In 2000, she and her husband, Yu Shaowen, moved to the United States and settled in Portland, Oregon. They currently teach at the U.S. Wushu Center. Gao is also a coach of the USAWKF National Traditional Wushu Team and the National Taijiquan Team.

== Awards ==
By the Chinese Wushu Association

- Top Ten Chinese Wushu Athletes (1995)

== See also ==
- List of Asian Games medalists in wushu
