= Chang Zhizhao =

Chinese wushu practitioner

Personal information
- Born: August 29, 1992 (age 33) Zongyang, Anhui, China
- Education: Lanzhou University
- Occupation(s): Martial artist, athlete
- Height: 1.64 m (5 ft 5 in)

Sport
- Sport: Wushu
- Event(s): Changquan, Daoshu, Gunshu
- Team: Gansu Wushu Team
- Coached by: Yu Hongju
Medal record
Men's Wushu Taolu
Representing China
World Championships
| Gold medal – first place | 2017 Kazan | Changquan |
World Cup
| Gold medal – first place | 2018 Yangon | Changquan |
Asian Games
| Gold medal – first place | 2022 Hangzhou | Daoshu + Gunshu |
World Junior Championships
| Gold medal – first place | 2010 Singapore | Daoshu (A) |

Chang Zhizhao (Chinese: 常志昭; pinyin: Cháng zhì zhāo; born: August 29, 1992) is a professional wushu taolu athlete from China.

== Career ==
=== Junior ===
Chang started practicing wushu at the age of eight. He made his international debut at the 2010 World Junior Wushu Championships where he won the gold medal in group A boy's daoshu.

=== Senior ===
At the 2017 World Wushu Championships, he became the world champion in men's changquan. He repeated this victory a year later at the 2018 Taolu World Cup. Around this time, he became a coach at Lanzhou University. Three years later, he won the silver medal in men's changquan all-around in the 2021 National Games of China. At the 2022 Asian Games, Chang won the gold medal in men's daoshu and gunshu combined.

== Competitive history ==
| Year | Event | CQ | DS | GS | AA |
Junior
| 2010 | World Junior Championships | | 1st place, gold medalist(s) | | |
Senior
| 2013 | National Games of China | ? | ? | ? | 4 |
| 2017 | National Games of China | ? | ? | ? | 3rd place, bronze medalist(s) |
| 2017 | World Championships | 1st place, gold medalist(s) | | | |
| 2018 | World Cup | 1st place, gold medalist(s) | | | |
| 2020 | did not compete due to COVID-19 pandemic | | | | |
| 2021 | National Games of China | 2 | 3 | 3 | 2nd place, silver medalist(s) |
| 2023 | Asian Games | | 1 | 1 | 1st place, gold medalist(s) |

== See also ==
- China national wushu team
- List of Asian Games medalists in wushu
