= Singapore at the 1994 Asian Games =

- IOC code: SIN
- NOC: Singapore National Olympic Council
- Website: www.singaporeolympics.com (in English)

in Hiroshima
- Competitors: 99 in 17 sports
- Flag bearer: Matthew Tan (Water polo)
- Medals Ranked 20th: Gold 1 Silver 1 Bronze 5 Total 7

Asian Games appearances (overview)
- 1951; 1954; 1958; 1962; 1966; 1970; 1974; 1978; 1982; 1986; 1990; 1994; 1998; 2002; 2006; 2010; 2014; 2018; 2022; 2026

Singapore competed in the 1994 Asian Games in Hiroshima, Japan from 2 to 16 October 1994. Singapore ended the games with a total of 7 medals.

== Medal summary ==
=== Medals by sport ===
Sport	Gold	Silver	Bronze	Total	Rank
Bowling	0	0	1	1	8
Sailing	1	1	0	2	3
Sepaktakraw	0	0	1	1	3
Swimming	0	0	1	1	8
Wushu	0	0	2	2	7
Total	1	1	5	7	20

=== Medalists ===
Medal	Name	Sport	Event	Date
Gold	Benedict Tan	Sailing	Men's Laser	
Silver	Siew Shaw Her; Charles Lim	Sailing	Men's 470	
Bronze	Grace Young	Bowling	Women's singles	
Bronze	Nur Hisham Adam; Mohd Fami Mohamed; Mislan Munjari; Ahmad Yasin	Sepak takraw	Men's regu	15 October
Bronze	Joscelin Yeo	Swimming	Women's 100 m butterfly	
Bronze	Chiew Hui Yan	Wushu	Women's changquan	
Bronze	Tan Mui Buay	Wushu	Women's taijiquan	
