= Yousef Sabri =

Iranian wushu practitioner

Personal information
- Full name: Yousef Sabri Abibegloo
- Born: 2 March 1998 (age 28) Namin, Iran
- Height: 172 cm (5 ft 8 in)

Sport
- Sport: Wushu
- Event: Sanda
Medal record
Wushu
Representing Iran
Asian Games
Gold medal – first place	2022 Hangzhou	Sanda 75 kg
World Championships
Gold medal – first place	2019 Shanghai	Sanda 75 kg
Gold medal – first place	2017 Kazan	Sanda 75 kg

Yousef Sabri Abibegloo (Persian: یوسف صبری آبی‌بیگلو, born 2 March 1998) is an Iranian wushu practitioner.

== Career ==
Sabri won gold medals at the 2017 and 2019 World Championships in the 75 kg sanda category.

Sabri qualified for the 2022 Asian Games. In the round of 16, he defeated Shokhzod Tashpolatov. Subsequently, he beat Uzbekistan's Azizbek Isroilov and Afghanistan's Nasratullah Habibi in the quarter-finals and semi-finals, respectively. Finally, he defeated Macau's Cai Feilong to win the gold medal.
