= Wushu at the 2002 Asian Games – Men's taijiquan combined =

Men's taijiquan combined at the 2002 Asian Games
- Venue: Minseok Sports Center
- Dates: 11–12 October 2002
- Competitors: 13 from 12 nations

Medalists
gold medal	Yang Seong-chan	South Korea
silver medal	Chan Ming-shu	Chinese Taipei
bronze medal	Bobby Co	Philippines

The men's taijiquan and taijijian combined event at the 2002 Asian Games in Busan, South Korea was held from 11 to 12 October at the Dongseo University Minseok Sports Center.

== Schedule ==
All times are Korea Standard Time (UTC+09:00)

Date	Time	Event
Friday, 11 October 2002	09:00	Taijiquan
Saturday, 12 October 2002	13:00	Taijijian

== Results ==
Legend

- DNS — Did not start

Rank	Athlete	Taijiquan	Taijijian	Total
1st place, gold medalist(s)	Yang Seong-chan (KOR)	9.43	9.45	18.88
2nd place, silver medalist(s)	Chan Ming-shu (TPE)	9.40	9.43	18.83
3rd place, bronze medalist(s)	Bobby Co (PHI)	9.35	9.30	18.65
4	Toshiya Watanabe (JPN)	9.31	9.33	18.64
5	Zhuang Zhiyong (CHN)	9.31	9.31	18.62
6	Chang Ching-kuei (TPE)	9.30	9.28	18.58
6	Goh Qiu Bin (SIN)	9.30	9.28	18.58
8	Nguyễn Anh Minh (VIE)	9.28	9.21	18.49
9	Ho Man Leok (MAC)	9.23	9.25	18.48
10	Cheung Man Keung (HKG)	9.20	9.20	18.40
11	Choo Ee Wee (MAS)	8.96	8.91	17.87
12	Sujith Manju Kumara (SRI)	8.90	8.35	17.25
13	Suraj Kumar Shrestha (NEP)	DNS	8.78	8.78
