= Wushu at the 2022 Asian Games – Men's daoshu & gunshu =

Men's daoshu & gunshu at the 2022 Asian Games
- Venue: Xiaoshan Guali Sports Centre
- Dates: 27 September 2023
- Competitors: 11 from 11 nations

Medalists
gold medal	Chang Zhizhao	China
silver medal	Jowen Lim	Singapore
bronze medal	Seraf Naro Siregar	Indonesia

The men's daoshu and gunshu competition at the 2022 Asian Games was held on 27 September 2023 at Xiaoshan Guali Sports Centre in Hangzhou, China.

== Schedule ==
All times are China Standard Time (UTC+08:00)

Date	Time	Event
Wednesday, 27 September 2023	09:00	Jianshu
Wednesday, 27 September 2023	14:30	Qiangshu

== Results ==
Rank	Athlete	Daoshu	Gunshu	Total
1st place, gold medalist(s)	Chang Zhizhao (CHN)	9.826	9.800	19.626
2nd place, silver medalist(s)	Jowen Lim (SGP)	9.733	9.743	19.476
3rd place, bronze medalist(s)	Seraf Naro Siregar (INA)	9.726	9.740	19.466
4	Wang Chen-ming (TPE)	9.736	9.716	19.452
5	Clement Ting (MAS)	9.713	9.723	19.436
6	Hossein Gheblehnama (IRI)	9.423	9.696	19.119
7	Johnzenth Gajo (PHI)	9.680	9.403	19.083
8	Lee Yong-hyun (KOR)	9.386	9.586	18.972
9	Rohit Jadhav (IND)	9.413	9.553	18.966
10	Walid Lachkar (BRU)	9.376	9.390	18.766
11	Maho Imai (JPN)	9.263	8.920	18.183
