= Liu Qinghua =

Chinese wushu practitioner

Personal information
- Born: 1974 (age 51–52) Liaoning, China

Sport
- Sport: Wushu
- Event(s): Changquan, Jianshu, Qiangshu
- Team: Liaoning Wushu team (1985-1995); Beijing Wushu Team (1995-2001)
- Coached by: Pan Qingfu (Liaoning); Wu Bin (Beijing)
- Retired: 2001
Medal record
Women's Wushu Taolu
Representing China
World Championships
Gold medal – first place	1993 Kuala Lumpur	Jianshu
Gold medal – first place	2001 Yerevan	Jianshu (new)
Asian Games
Gold medal – first place	1998 Bangkok	CQ All-Around
Asian Championships
Gold medal – first place	1996 Manila	Changquan

Liu Qinghua (Chinese: 刘清华; pinyin: Liúqīnghuá) is a retired professional wushu taolu athlete from China. She is commonly regarded as one of the greatest female wushu athletes of all time. She is a two-time world champion and Asian Games gold medalist.

== Career ==
Liu started training wushu in 1983, and was invited to start training with the Liaoning Wushu Team in 1985 under Pan Qingfu. In 1990, she won the provincial championship and in 1993, she became the world champion in jianshu at the 1993 World Wushu Championships in Kuala Lumpur, Malaysia, winning the first medal for China at the competition. Two years later, she was transferred to the Beijing Wushu Team to train under Wu Bin. A year later, she won the gold medal in changquan at the 1996 Asian Wushu Championships. At the 1997 National Games of China in Shanghai, Liu won the gold medal in women's all-around changquan. A year later, she competed in the 1998 Asian Games in women's changquan all-around and won the gold medal. Three years later, Liu was a double medalist at the 2001 National Games of China in Guangdong, winning the gold medal in the changquan compulsory and optional routine combined event and winning the silver medal in the jianshu and qiangshu event. As her last competition, she appeared at the 2001 World Wushu Championships in Yerevan, Armenia, and became the world champion in jianshu once again. In December 2001, Liu announced her retirement and married a Sanda coach. As of May 2021, Liu serves as an executive vice chairman and secretary-general of the Binzhou Municipal Wushu Association.

== Competitive history ==
Year	Event	CQ	JS	QS	AA
1993	World Championships		1st place, gold medalist(s)		
1996	Asian Championships	1st place, gold medalist(s)			
1997	National Games	1st place, gold medalist(s)	?	?	1st place, gold medalist(s)
1998	Asian Games	1	1	1	1st place, gold medalist(s)
2001	World Championships		1st place, gold medalist(s)		
2001	National Games	1st place, gold medalist(s)	?	?	2nd place, silver medalist(s)

== Awards ==
- Chinese Wushu Association - Top 100 Chinese Martial Artists: 1995
- China Central Television - Sports Stars Awards: 2001 (nominated)

== See also ==
- List of Asian Games medalists in wushu
