= Wushu at the 2014 Asian Games – Men's daoshu & gunshu =

Men's daoshu & gunshu at the 2014 Asian Games
- Venue: Ganghwa Dolmens Gymnasium
- Dates: 21 September 2014
- Competitors: 10 from 10 nations

Medalists
gold medal	Sun Peiyuan	China
silver medal	Lee Yong-hyun	South Korea
bronze medal	Nguyễn Mạnh Quyền	Vietnam

The men's daoshu / gunshu all-round competition at the 2014 Asian Games in Incheon, South Korea was held on 21 September at the Ganghwa Dolmens Gymnasium.

== Schedule ==
All times are Korea Standard Time (UTC+09:00)

Date	Time	Event
Sunday, 21 September 2014	09:00	Daoshu
Sunday, 21 September 2014	14:00	Gunshu

== Results ==
Legend

- DNF — Did not finish
- DNS — Did not start

Rank	Athlete	Daoshu	Gunshu	Total
1st place, gold medalist(s)	Sun Peiyuan (CHN)	9.77	9.77	19.54
2nd place, silver medalist(s)	Lee Yong-hyun (KOR)	9.68	9.68	19.36
3rd place, bronze medalist(s)	Nguyễn Mạnh Quyền (VIE)	9.66	9.67	19.33
4	Wu Nok In (MAC)	9.60	9.62	19.22
5	Achmad Hulaefi (INA)	9.59	9.50	19.09
6	Almaz Toichuev (KGZ)	8.64	8.84	17.48
7	Rinji Sherpa (NEP)	8.66	8.54	17.20
8	Abdullah Saleh Masood (YEM)	7.62	8.35	15.97
9	Cheng Chung Hang (HKG)	9.60	DNF	9.60
—	Jawad Rasuli Boman (AFG)			DNS
