= Picasso Tan =

Singaporean wushu practitioner

Personal information
- Born: 1973 (age 52–53)

Sport
- Sport: Wushu
- Event(s): Nanquan, Daoshu, Gunshu
- Team: Singapore Wushu Team
Medal record
Men's Wushu Taolu
Representing Singapore
World Championships
Silver medal – second place	1995 Baltimore	Nanquan
Asian Games
Bronze medal – third place	1998 Bangkok	Nanquan
Asian Championships
Gold medal – first place	1996 Manila	Nanquan
SEA Games
Gold medal – first place	1993 Singapore	Nanquan
Silver medal – second place	1993 Singapore	Daoshu
Bronze medal – third place	1997 Jakarta	Nanquan

Picasso Tan Yeow Kuan is a retired competitive wushu taolu athlete from Singapore.

== Career ==
Tan made his debut at the 1993 SEA Games where he won a gold medal in nanquan and a silver medal in daoshu. A year later, Tan competed at the 1994 Asian Games and finished in seventh place in men's nanquan. A year later, he won a silver medal in nanquan at the 1995 World Wushu Championships. He then competed in the 1996 Asian Wushu Championships and became the Asian champion in nanquan. At the 1997 SEA Games, he won a bronze medal in nanquan. Tan's last competition was at the 1998 Asian Games where he won a three-way tied bronze medal in men's nanquan.

After retiring from wushu, Tan founded Picasso International Productions which is an event choreography, production, and management company based in Singapore.

== See also ==
- List of Asian Games medalists in wushu
