= Macau at the 1990 Asian Games =

- IOC code: MAC
- NOC: Macau Sports and Olympic Committee

in Beijing
- Medals Ranked 22nd: Gold 0 Silver 0 Bronze 1 Total 1

Asian Games appearances (overview)
- 1990; 1994; 1998; 2002; 2006; 2010; 2014; 2018; 2022; 2026

Macau participated in the 1990 Asian Games held in Beijing, China from September 22, 1990 to October 7, 1990. This was Macau's first participation in the Asian Games. Wong Tong Ieong was the only medalist for Macau, who won the bronze medal in the men's nanquan event of the wushu competition.
