= Wushu at the 1994 Asian Games – Men's taijiquan =

Men's taijiquan at the 1994 Asian Games
- Venue: Aki Ward Sports Center
- Dates: 12 October 1994
- Competitors: 10 from 10 nations

Medalists
gold medal	Masaru Masuda	Japan
silver medal	Chan Ming-shu	Chinese Taipei
bronze medal	Han Gyeong-su	South Korea
bronze medal	Daniel Go	Philippines

The men's taijiquan competition at the 1994 Asian Games in Hiroshima, Japan was held on 12 October at Aki Ward Sports Center.

== Schedule ==
All times are Japan Standard Time (UTC+09:00)

Date	Time	Event
Wednesday, 12 October 1994	13:00	Final

== Results ==
Legend

- DNS — Did not start

Rank	Athlete	Score
1st place, gold medalist(s)	Masaru Masuda (JPN)	9.75
2nd place, silver medalist(s)	Chan Ming-shu (TPE)	9.65
3rd place, bronze medalist(s)	Han Gyeong-su (KOR)	9.53
3rd place, bronze medalist(s)	Daniel Go (PHI)	9.53
5	Cheah Kok Luan (MAS)	9.28
6	Wong Chi Kwong (HKG)	9.28
7	Leong Chong Leng (MAC)	9.23
8	Batmönkhiin Ölziisaikhan (MGL)	9.20
9	Karma Rabgye Lama (NEP)	8.96
—	Wang Erping (CHN)	DNS
