= Wushu at the 1990 Asian Games – Women's taijiquan =

Women's taijiquan at the 1990 Asian Games
- Venue: Haidian Gymnasium
- Dates: 3 October 1990

Medalists
gold medal	Su Zifang	China
silver medal	Gao Jiamin	China
bronze medal	Huang Ti-na	Chinese Taipei

The women's taijiquan competition at the 1990 Asian Games in Beijing, China was held on 3 October 1990 at Haidian Gymnasium.

== Results ==
* The results are incomplete.

Rank	Athlete	Score
1st place, gold medalist(s)	Su Zifang (CHN)	9.85
2nd place, silver medalist(s)	Gao Jiamin (CHN)	9.78
3rd place, bronze medalist(s)	Huang Ti-na (TPE)	9.60
4	Hisako Morita (JPN)	9.56
5	Naoko Masuda (JPN)	9.53
6	Lan Hsiao-chien (TPE)	9.50
12	Yeoh Ju Lin (MAS)	8.96
