= Kinta 1881 =

- Directed by: CL Hor
- Written by: Chow Kam Leong
- Produced by: Jean Liang; Andrew Lee; Adrian Wong; Wong Chee Meng
- Cinematography: Jacky Tang
- Edited by: Dodo Heng
- Music by: Chow Kam Leong
- Production companies: Absolutely Black; Blackbox Pictures
- Release date: 4 December 2008
- Running time: 92 minutes
- Country: Malaysia
- Language: Chinese

Kinta 1881 is a 2007 Malaysian martial arts-action film. The film was the first Malaysian film in martial arts genre, such as Cicak Man for first Malaysian superhero film. Although being a Malaysian film, its language is Chinese. It was ported to the US, dubbed, and retitled Four Dragons in 2008.

== Plot ==
The film is set in the Kinta Valley in the 1880s, when tin ore was discovered in the area and Chinese immigrants flooded the valley in the hope of making their fortune.
