= Wushu at the 2026 Asian Games – Men's daoshu & gunshu =

Men's daoshu & gunshu at the 2026 Asian Games
- Venue: Aichi Budokan
- Dates: 23 September 2026
- Competitors: 10 from 10 nations

Medalists
gold medal	Gao Xiaobin	China
silver medal	Lee Ha-sung	South Korea
bronze medal	Clement Ting	Malaysia

The men's daoshu and gunshu all-round competition at the 2026 Asian Games was held on 23 September 2026 at Aichi Prefectural Martial Arts Hall in Nagoya, Japan.

== Schedule ==
All times are Japan Standard Time (UTC+09:00)

Date	Time	Event
Wednesday, 23 September 2026	09:00	Daoshu
Wednesday, 23 September 2026	14:30	Gunshu

== Results ==
Rank	Athlete	Daoshu	Gunshu	Total
1st place, gold medalist(s)	Gao Xiaobin (CHN)	9.786	9.796	19.582
2nd place, silver medalist(s)	Lee Ha-sung (KOR)	9.706	9.700	19.406
3rd place, bronze medalist(s)	Clement Ting (MAS)	9.690	9.713	19.403
4	Hossein Gheblehnama (IRI)	9.690	9.696	19.386
5	Mark Lester Ragay (PHI)	9.680	9.690	19.370
6	Jowen Lim (SGP)	9.503	9.723	19.226
7	Maho Imai (JPN)	9.693	9.443	19.136
8	Vũ Văn Tuấn (VIE)	9.326	9.650	18.976
9	Lee Po-feng (TPE)	9.516	9.263	18.779
10	Rajib Tamang (NEP)	9.313	8.600	17.913
