= Wushu at the 2002 Asian Games – Men's sanshou 70 kg =

Men's sanshou 70 kg at the 2002 Asian Games
- Venue: Minseok Sports Center
- Dates: 11–13 October 2002
- Competitors: 7 from 7 nations

Medalists
gold medal	Hossein Ojaghi	Iran
silver medal	Metee Ponork	Thailand
bronze medal	Magsarjavyn Batjargal	Mongolia
bronze medal	Li Jie	China

The men's sanshou 70 kilograms at the 2002 Asian Games in Busan, South Korea was held from 11 to 13 October at the Dongseo University Minseok Sports Center.

== Schedule ==
All times are Korea Standard Time (UTC+09:00)

Date	Time	Event
Friday, 11 October 2002	14:00	1st preliminary round
Saturday, 12 October 2002	16:00	Semifinals
Sunday, 13 October 2002	14:30	Final

== Results ==
1st preliminary round		Semifinals		Final
		Magsarjavyn Batjargal (MGL)	0
Si Kam Seng (MAC)	0	Metee Ponork (THA)	2
Metee Ponork (THA)	2			Metee Ponork (THA)	0
Ardak Saret (KAZ)	0			Hossein Ojaghi (IRI)	2
Li Jie (CHN)	2	Li Jie (CHN)	0
Sanjar Saparbekov (KGZ)	0	Hossein Ojaghi (IRI)	2
Hossein Ojaghi (IRI)	2
