= Wushu at the 1994 Asian Games – Women's changquan combined =

Women's changquan combined at the 1994 Asian Games
- Venue: Aki Ward Sports Center
- Dates: 12–14 October 1994
- Competitors: 12 from 8 nations

Medalists
gold medal	Zhuang Hui	China
silver medal	Momi Matsumura	Japan
bronze medal	Chiew Hui Yan	Singapore

The women's changquan competition at the 1994 Asian Games in Hiroshima, Japan was held from 12 to 14 October at Aki Ward Sports Center.

== Schedule ==
All times are Japan Standard Time (UTC+09:00)

Date	Time	Event
Wednesday, 12 October 1994	13:00	Long weapon
Thursday, 13 October 1994	14:30	Short weapon
Friday, 14 October 1994	14:30	Changquan

== Results ==
Legend

- DNF — Did not finish
- DNS — Did not start

Rank	Athlete	Long weapon		Short weapon		Changquan	Total
Rank	Athlete	Gun	Qiang	Dao	Jian	Changquan	Total
1st place, gold medalist(s)	Zhuang Hui (CHN)		9.75		9.78	9.78	29.31
2nd place, silver medalist(s)	Momi Matsumura (JPN)		9.53		9.45	9.55	28.53
3rd place, bronze medalist(s)	Chiew Hui Yan (SIN)		9.43		9.56	9.46	28.45
4	Yuri Kaminiwa (JPN)		9.21		9.58	9.53	28.32
5	Nguyễn Thúy Hiền (VIE)		9.45	9.43		9.43	28.31
6	Doyoddorjiin Ariuntögs (MGL)	9.35		9.38		9.30	28.03
7	Dambyn Narangerel (MGL)		9.23		9.20	9.18	27.61
8	Kamala Lopchan (NEP)	9.18		9.18		9.21	27.57
9	Tsui Lim Chi (HKG)	9.00		9.16		9.15	27.31
10	Man Ut Wan (MAC)	8.93			9.06	9.00	26.99
—	Li Shuhong (CHN)		9.76		9.73	DNS	DNF
—	Li Fai (HKG)		DNS		DNS	DNS	DNS
