= Clement Ting =

Malaysian wushu practitioner

Personal information
- Born: 9 February 1998 (age 28)
- Occupations: Martial artist, athlete

Sport
- Sport: Wushu
- Events: Changquan, Daoshu, Gunshu
- Team: Malaysia Wushu Team
Medal record
Men's Wushu Taolu
Representing Malaysia
World Championships
Silver medal – second place	2023 Fort Forth	Daoshu
Bronze medal – third place	2023 Fort Worth	Changquan
Bronze medal – third place	2023 Fort Worth	Gunshu
Bronze medal – third place	2025 Brasília	Duilian
Asian Championships
Bronze medal – third place	2024 Macau	Gunshu
Asian Games
Bronze medal – third place	2026 Aichi–Nagoya	Daoshu & Gunshu
SEA Games
Gold medal – first place	2021 Vietnam	Changquan
Bronze medal – third place	2025 Thailand	Changquan+Daoshu+Gunshu
Asian Cup
Gold medal – first place	2025 Songyuan	Gunshu

Clement Ting Su Wei (Chinese: 陈思卫; pinyin: Chénsīwèi) is a wushu taolu athlete from Malaysia.

== Career ==
Ting made his international debut at the 2019 World Wushu Championships where he finished 4th in daoshu. After the start of the COVID-19 pandemic, he competed in the 2021 SEA Games (hosted in 2022) and won the gold medal in men's changquan despite contracting the COVID-19 virus a few days prior. A year later, he competed in the 2023 SEA Games but did not place. He then competed in the 2022 Asian Games and finished 5th in men's daoshu and gunshu combined. Shortly after, he became one of the few triple medalists at the 2023 World Wushu Championships, winning a tied silver medal in daoshu and bronze medals in changquan and gunshu. Months later, he won the bronze medal in gunshu at the 2024 Asian Wushu Championships. A year later, he won the gold medal at the 2025 Asian Taolu Cup.
