= Xu Shuzhen =

- Born: 1937年
- Died: November 25, 2018 (aged 80–81)
- Nationality: China
- Rank: Chinese Martial Arts Eighth Duan

Other information
- Occupation: martial arts athlete,martial arts coach,martial arts referee
- Notable relatives: Xu Wenzhong（Father）

Xu Shuzhen (1937 – November 25, 2018) was a female martial artist, coach, and referee from Shanghai, China. She held the rank of Eighth Duan in Chinese martial arts. During her lifetime, she served as the Vice President of the Anhui Provincial Martial Arts Association, President of the Hefei Martial Arts Association, a representative of the Hefei People's Congress, and a member of the Hefei Political Consultative Conference.

== Biography ==
Xu Shuzhen was originally from Huaian, Jiangsu, and was born in Shanghai. Her father, Xu Wenzhong, was a martial arts coach. Xu Shuzhen began practicing martial arts with her father from a young age.

In 1958, Xu Shuzhen joined the Anhui Provincial Sports Commission Martial Arts Team. In the 1959 National First Sports Meeting, she won a first-place award. At the 1964 National Martial Arts Championships, she won the swordsmanship championship, first place in the performance event with double hooks, second place in all-around competition, and third place in hand-to-hand combat. In 1974, she moved to Hefei and began working as a martial arts coach.

In 1990, Xu Shuzhen was approved as an international-level referee and served as a martial arts competition judge at the Beijing Asian Games. In 1993, she was the chief referee at the 2nd World Wushu Championships. In 1997, she served as the chief referee for the martial arts competition at the East Asian Games.

In 1978, Xu Shuzhen was elected as a representative of the Hefei People's Congress, and in 1995, she was elected as a member of the Hefei Political Consultative Conference. She also served as the Vice President of the Anhui Provincial Martial Arts Association and the President of the Hefei Martial Arts Association. In 2001, she founded the Hefei Yingjie Wushu School and served as its principal. She died on November 25, 2018, at the age of 81.
