= Wushu at the 2010 Asian Games – Men's daoshu & gunshu =

Men's daoshu & gunshu at the 2010 Asian Games
- Venue: Nansha Gymnasium
- Dates: 14 November 2010
- Competitors: 11 from 9 nations

Medalists
gold medal	Jia Rui	Macau
silver medal	Lee Jong-chan	South Korea
bronze medal	Nguyễn Mạnh Quyền	Vietnam

The men's daoshu / gunshu all-round competition at the 2010 Asian Games in Guangzhou, China was held on 14 November at the Nansha Gymnasium.

== Schedule ==
All times are China Standard Time (UTC+08:00)

Date	Time	Event
Sunday, 14 November 2010	08:30	Daoshu
Sunday, 14 November 2010	14:30	Gunshu

== Results ==
Legend

- DNS — Did not start

Rank	Athlete	Daoshu	Gunshu	Total
1st place, gold medalist(s)	Jia Rui (MAC)	9.81	9.80	19.61
2nd place, silver medalist(s)	Lee Jong-chan (KOR)	9.71	9.71	19.42
3rd place, bronze medalist(s)	Nguyễn Mạnh Quyền (VIE)	9.69	9.69	19.38
4	David Hendrawan (INA)	9.60	9.59	19.19
5	Van Ka Lok (MAC)	9.42	9.51	18.93
6	Aldy Lukman (INA)	9.63	9.18	18.81
7	Cheng Chung Hang (HKG)	9.43	9.18	18.61
8	Almaz Toichuev (KGZ)	8.30	8.41	16.71
9	Nirajan Ale Magar (NEP)	7.86	7.76	15.62
10	Siyovush Gulmamadov (TJK)	DNS	6.97	6.97
11	Mohammad Jawad Sakha (AFG)	6.72	DNS	6.72
