= Wushu at the 1994 Asian Games – Women's taijiquan =

Women's taijiquan at the 1994 Asian Games
- Venue: Aki Ward Sports Center
- Dates: 14 October 1994
- Competitors: 10 from 10 nations

Medalists
gold medal	Gao Jiamin	China
silver medal	Naoko Masuda	Japan
bronze medal	Tan Mui Buay	Singapore

The women's taijiquan competition at the 1994 Asian Games in Hiroshima, Japan was held on 14 October at the Aki Ward Sports Center.

== Schedule ==
All times are Japan Standard Time (UTC+09:00)

Date	Time	Event
Friday, 14 October 1994	13:00	Final

== Results ==
Rank	Athlete	Score
1st place, gold medalist(s)	Gao Jiamin (CHN)	9.81
2nd place, silver medalist(s)	Naoko Masuda (JPN)	9.70
3rd place, bronze medalist(s)	Tan Mui Buay (SIN)	9.60
4	Lan Hsiao-chien (TPE)	9.56
5	Sam Pou Wa (MAC)	9.48
6	Koh Ki-sun (KOR)	9.41
7	Jainab (INA)	9.38
8	Alla Kuvatova (KAZ)	9.03
9	Makhgalsürengiin Enkhtüvshin (MGL)	8.96
10	Neelam Karki (NEP)	8.95
