= Wushu at the 2002 Asian Games – Men's nanquan combined =

Men's nanquan combined at the 2002 Asian Games
- Venue: Minseok Sports Center
- Dates: 10–13 October 2002
- Competitors: 14 from 12 nations

Medalists
gold medal	Ho Ro Bin	Malaysia
silver medal	Hu Lifeng	China
bronze medal	Cheng Ka Ho	Hong Kong

The men's nanquan three events combined competition (Nanquan, Nandao and Nangun) at the 2002 Asian Games in Busan, South Korea was held from 10 to 13 October at the Dongseo University Minseok Sports Center.

== Schedule ==
All times are Korea Standard Time (UTC+09:00)

Date	Time	Event
Thursday, 10 October 2002	14:00	Nanquan
Saturday, 12 October 2002	10:00	Nandao
Sunday, 13 October 2002	10:00	Nangun

== Results ==
Rank	Athlete	Nanquan	Nandao	Nangun	Total
1st place, gold medalist(s)	Ho Ro Bin (MAS)	9.45	9.40	9.43	28.28
2nd place, silver medalist(s)	Hu Lifeng (CHN)	9.43	9.41	9.36	28.20
3rd place, bronze medalist(s)	Cheng Ka Ho (HKG)	9.41	9.38	9.40	28.19
4	Kim Young-jea (KOR)	9.43	9.36	9.38	28.17
5	Trần Trọng Tuấn (VIE)	9.38	9.36	9.35	28.09
6	Leong Hong Man (MAC)	9.40	9.31	9.36	28.07
7	Munehisa Takayama (JPN)	9.36	9.30	9.31	27.97
8	Chan Siu Kit (HKG)	9.33	9.33	9.30	27.96
9	Zaw Zaw Moe (MYA)	9.35	9.30	9.30	27.95
10	Chang Wei-hsiang (TPE)	9.30	9.26	9.30	27.86
11	Hadi Ghamkhar (IRI)	9.28	9.25	9.23	27.76
12	Lê Quang Huy (VIE)	9.33	9.16	9.26	27.75
13	Tan Jun Beng (SIN)	9.18	9.25	9.20	27.63
14	Voradej Puangthong (THA)	8.96	8.86	8.71	26.53
