= Wushu at the 2022 Asian Games – Men's sanda 75 kg =

Men's sanda 75 kg at the 2022 Asian Games
- Venue: Xiaoshan Guali Sports Centre
- Dates: 24–28 September 2023
- Competitors: 9 from 9 nations

Medalists
gold medal	Yousef Sabri	Iran
silver medal	Cai Feilong	Macau
bronze medal	Nasratullah Habibi	Afghanistan
bronze medal	Temirlan Amankulov	Kyrgyzstan

The men's sanda 75 kilograms competition at the 2022 Asian Games in Hangzhou, China was held from 24 to 28 September 2023 at the Xiaoshan Guali Sports Centre.

A total of nine competitors from nine countries (NOCs) competed in this event, limited to fighters whose body weight was less than 75 kilograms.

Competition bouts consist of 3 rounds in total, each lasting two minutes with a one-minute rest period between rounds. The athlete who scores more points in each round is the winner of that rounds; the bout ends when one athlete has won two rounds (and thus the match).

== Schedule ==
All times are China Standard Time (UTC+08:00)

Date	Time	Event
Sunday, 24 September 2023	19:30	1/8 finals
Monday, 25 September 2023	19:30	Quarterfinals
Wednesday, 27 September 2023	19:30	Semifinals
Thursday, 28 September 2023	09:30	Final

== Results ==
Legend

- KO — Won by knockout
- PD — Won by point difference

1/8 finals
Shokhzod Tashpolatov (KAZ)
Yousef Sabri (IRI)	PD

Quarterfinals
Azizbek Isroilov (UZB)
Yousef Sabri (IRI)	KO
Thotsaphon Saophanao (THA)	0
Nasratullah Habibi (AFG)	2
Cai Feilong (MAC)	2
Muhammet Jumamyradow (TKM)	0
Temirlan Amankulov (KGZ)	KO
Narangereliin Byambadorj (MGL)

Semifinals
Yousef Sabri (IRI)	PD
Nasratullah Habibi (AFG)
Cai Feilong (MAC)	KO
Temirlan Amankulov (KGZ)

Final
Yousef Sabri (IRI)	PD
Cai Feilong (MAC)
