= Wushu at the 1990 Asian Games – Men's taijiquan =

Tai chi competition

Men's taijiquan at the 1990 Asian Games
- Venue: Haidian Gymnasium
- Dates: 30 September 1990

Medalists
gold medal	Chen Sitan	China
silver medal	Wang Zengxiang	China
bronze medal	Nobutsugu Arai	Japan

The men's taijiquan competition at the 1990 Asian Games in Beijing, China was held on 30 September 1990 at Haidian Gymnasium.

== Results ==
* The results are incomplete.

Rank	Athlete	Score
1st place, gold medalist(s)	Chen Sitan (CHN)	9.75
2nd place, silver medalist(s)	Wang Zengxiang (CHN)	9.73
3rd place, bronze medalist(s)	Nobutsugu Arai (JPN)	9.68
4	Masaru Masuda (JPN)	9.55
5	Chan Ming-shu (TPE)	9.46
6	Puan Jool Eong (SIN)	9.41
