= Wu Gang (wushu) =

Chinese wushu practitioner and stuntman

Personal information
- Born: 1974 (age 51–52) China
- Occupations: Athlete, martial artist, stuntman

Sport
- Sport: Wushu
- Events: Changquan, Daoshu, Gunshu
- Team: Shanghai Wushu Team
Medal record
Representing China
Men's Wushu Taolu
World Championships
Gold medal – first place	1997 Rome	Qiangshu
Asian Games
Gold medal – first place	1998 Bangkok	CQ All-Around
Asian Championships
Gold medal – first place	1996 Manila	Changquan

Wu Gang (Chinese: 伍剛; pinyin: Wǔ gāng; born 1974) is a stunt coordinator and retired professional wushu taolu athlete and stuntman from China.

== Career ==
Wu made his international debut at the 1996 Asian Wushu Championships where he won the Asian champion in changquan. He then competed in the 1997 World Wushu Championships in Rome, Italy and became the world champion in men's qiangshu. A year later, he competed in the 1998 Asian Games in Bangkok, China, and won the gold medal in men's changquan.

After his competitive career, Wu joined the Jackie Chan Stunt Team and eventually became an action director and choreographer. In 2010, he served as the stunt coordinator for The Karate Kid and was Jaden Smith's coach. In 2016 at the 53rd Golden Horse Awards, Wu won the Golden Horse Award for Best Action Design for his work on Detective Chinatown.

== See also ==
- List of Asian Games medalists in wushu
