= Leung Yat Ho =

Chinese actor and wushu practitioner

Personal information
- Born: 1968 (age 57–58) Zhaoqing, Guangdong, China
- Occupation(s): Martial artist, actor

Sport
- Sport: Wushu
- Event: Nanquan
- Team: Guangxi Wushu Team (1979-1984); Guangdong Wushu Team (1984-1989); Hong Kong Wushu Team (1989-1998)
- Coached by: Yu Liguang
- Retired: 1998
Medal record
Men's Wushu Taolu
Representing Hong Kong
World Championships
Gold medal – first place	1991 Beijing	Nanquan
Gold medal – first place	1995 Baltimore	Nanquan
Bronze medal – third place	1993 Kuala Lumpur	Nanquan
Asian Games
Silver medal – second place	1990 Beijing	Nanquan
Silver medal – second place	1994 Hiroshima	Nanquan
Asian Championships
Gold medal – first place	1989 Hong Kong	Nanquan
Silver medal – second place	1992 Seoul	Nanquan
East Asian Games
Silver medal – second place	1993 Shanghai	Nanquan
Bronze medal – third place	1997 Busan	Nanquan
Representing Hong Kong
World Championships
Silver medal – second place	1997 Rome	Nanquan
Asian Games
Silver medal – second place	1998 Bangkok	Nanquan

Leung Yat Ho (Chinese: 梁日豪; pinyin: Liángrìháo; born: 1968) is a former actor and wushu taolu athlete from Hong Kong. He was a two-time world champion in nanquan and was also a triple silver medalist at the Asian Games.

== Competitive wushu career ==
In 1989, Leung moved to Hong Kong to pursue a career in acting. He continued to seriously train wushu at this time, and won the silver medal in men's nanquan at the 1990 Asian Games in Beijing. A year later, he became the first world champion in nanquan at the 1991 World Wushu Championships. Leung then won a bronze medal in the 1993 World Wushu Championships Kuala Lumpur and a silver medal at the 1993 East Asian Games. A year later, he won a silver medal in men's nanquan in the 1994 Asian Games in Hiroshima. At the 1995 World Wushu Championships in Baltimore, he was once again the world champion in nanquan. While representing the SAR of Hong Kong, he first achieved a silver medal victory in the 1997 World Wushu Championships in Rome. For his last competition, Leung won the silver medal in men's nanquan at the 1998 Asian Games in Bangkok.

== Filmography ==
- Outlaw Brothers (1990)
- The Revenge of Angel (1990)
- Wei Si Li zhi ba wang xie jia (1991)
- Once Upon a Time in China II (1992)
- Once Upon a Time in China IV (1994)
- The Kung Fu Master (TV series) (1994)
- Shi cheng shen tan (1995)
- Kuang ye san qian xiang (1996)
- Another Meltdown (1998)

== See also ==
- List of Asian Games medalists in wushu
