= He Qiang =

Chinese wushu practitioner

Personal information
- Nickname: 南拳王 "King of Nanquan"
- Born: 1970 (age 55–56) Leizhou, Guangdong, China

Sport
- Sport: Wushu
- Event: Nanquan
- Team: Guangdong Wushu Team (1985-)
Medal record
Representing China
Men's Wushu Taolu
World Championships
| Gold medal – first place | 1993 Kuala Lumpur | Nanquan |
Asian Games
| Gold medal – first place | 1990 Beijing | Nanquan |
| Gold medal – first place | 1994 Hiroshima | Nanquan |
Asian Championships
| Gold medal – first place | 1992 Seoul | Nanquan |

He Qiang (simplified Chinese: 何强; traditional Chinese: 何強; pinyin: Hé qiáng) is a retired professional wushu taolu athlete from China.

== Career ==
At the 1990 Asian Games, Qiang won the first gold medal for China in men's nanquan. Two years later, he became the world champion in nanquan at the 1993 World Wushu Championships. He then competed in the 1994 Asian Games and won once again in men's nanquan, becoming the second double gold-medalist at the Games alongside Yuan Wenqing.

== Awards ==
By the Chinese Wushu Association:

- Election of the Top 100 Chinese Martial Artists: 100 Outstanding Martial Artists (1995)
- 7th Duan Rank (2003)

== See also ==
- List of Asian Games medalists in wushu
