= Chiew Hui Yan =

Singaporean wushu practitioner

Personal information
- Born: 1955 (age 70–71)

Sport
- Sport: Wushu
- Event(s): Taijiquan, Taijijian
- Team: Singapore Wushu Team
Medal record
Women's Wushu Taolu
Representing Singapore
World Championships
| Silver medal – second place | 1993 Kuala Lumpur | Qiangshu |
| Bronze medal – third place | 1995 Baltimore | Changquan |
Asian Games
| Bronze medal – third place | 1994 Hiroshima | CQ All-around |
Asian Championships
| Bronze medal – third place | 1996 Manila | Jianshu |
SEA Games
| Gold medal – first place | 1993 Singapore | Jianshu |
| Gold medal – first place | 1993 Singapore | Qiangshu |
| Silver medal – second place | 1993 Singapore | Changquan |
| Bronze medal – third place | 1991 Manila | Changquan |
| Bronze medal – third place | 1991 Manila | Jianshu |
| Bronze medal – third place | 1997 Jakarta | Jianshu |
| Bronze medal – third place | 1997 Jakarta | Qiangshu |

Chiew Hui Yan (Chinese: 周慧燕; pinyin: Zhōuhuìyàn) is a retired competitive wushu taolu athlete from Singapore.

== Career ==
Chiew made her international debut at the 1991 SEA Games where she won bronze medals in changquan and jianshu. Two years later at the 1993 SEA Games, she won gold medals in jianshu and qiangshu and a silver medal in changquan. A few months later, she won the silver medal in qiangshu at the 1993 World Wushu Championships. A year later, Chiew competed at the 1994 Asian Games and won the bronze medal in women's changquan all-around. A year later, she won the bronze medal in changquan at the 1995 World Wushu Championships. She then competed in the 1996 Asian Wushu Championships and won the bronze medal in jianshu. Chew's last competition was at the 1997 SEA Games where she won bronze medals in jianshu and qiangshu.

After retiring from wushu, she began to promote and teach wushu, becoming a certified coach under Singapore's People's Association. In the late 1990s, she met Beijing Wushu Team member Xue Xingfu and settled in Singapore to found Wushuyuan Singapore which promotes wushu.

== See also ==
- List of Asian Games medalists in wushu
