= Wushu at the 1998 Asian Games – Women's changquan combined =

Women's changquan combined at the 1998 Asian Games
- Venue: Thammasat Gymnasium 6
- Dates: 16–18 December 1998
- Competitors: 8 from 7 nations

Medalists
gold medal	Liu Qinghua	China
silver medal	Nguyễn Thúy Hiền	Vietnam
bronze medal	Yuri Kaminiwa	Japan

The women's changquan competition at the 1998 Asian Games in Bangkok, Thailand, was held from December 16–18 at the Thammasat Gymnasium 6.

== Schedule ==
All times are Indochina Time (UTC+07:00)

Date	Time	Event
Wednesday, 16 December 1998	20:00	Short weapon
Thursday, 17 December 1998	20:00	Long weapon
Friday, 18 December 1998	20:00	Changquan

== Results ==
Legend

- DNF — Did not finish

Rank	Athlete	Score
1st place, gold medalist(s)	Liu Qinghua (CHN)	28.64
2nd place, silver medalist(s)	Nguyễn Thúy Hiền (VIE)	28.01
3rd place, bronze medalist(s)	Yuri Kaminiwa (JPN)	27.80
4	Đàm Thanh Xuân (VIE)	27.51
5	Man Ut Wan (MAC)	27.38
6	Kuo Tzu-ling (TPE)	27.35
7	Doyoddorjiin Ariuntögs (MGL)	
—	Lo Nga Ching (HKG)	DNF
