= China at the 1993 East Asian Games =

- IOC code: CHN
- NOC: Chinese Olympic Committee external link (in Chinese and English)

in Shanghai
- Medals Ranked 1st: Gold 105 Silver 74 Bronze 34 Total 213

East Asian Games appearances
- 1993; 1997; 2001; 2005; 2009; 2013

China competed in the 1993 East Asian Games which were held in Shanghai, China from May 9, 1993 to May 18, 1993. It won 105 gold, 74 silver and 34 bronze medals.

== See also ==
- China at the Asian Games
- China at the Olympics
- Sports in China
