= Wushu at the 1998 Asian Games – Men's changquan combined =

Men's changquan combined at the 1998 Asian Games
- Venue: Thammasat Gymnasium 6
- Dates: 16–18 December 1998
- Competitors: 18 from 13 nations

Medalists
gold medal	Wu Gang	China
silver medal	Mark Robert Rosales	Philippines
silver medal	Oh Poh Soon	Malaysia

The men's changquan competition at the 1998 Asian Games in Bangkok, Thailand, was held from 16 to 18 December 1998 at the Thammasat Gymnasium 6.

== Schedule ==
All times are Indochina Time (UTC+07:00)

Date	Time	Event
Wednesday, 16 December 1998	20:00	Short weapon
Thursday, 17 December 1998	14:00	Changquan
Friday, 18 December 1998	14:00	Long weapon

== Results ==
Rank	Athlete	Score
1st place, gold medalist(s)	Wu Gang (CHN)	28.54
2nd place, silver medalist(s)	Mark Robert Rosales (PHI)	27.78
2nd place, silver medalist(s)	Oh Poh Soon (MAS)	27.78
4	Hiroshi Yoshida (JPN)	27.72
5	Ng Wa Loi (MAC)	27.65
5	Leo Wen Yeow (SIN)	27.65
7	Chow Ting Yu (HKG)	27.63
8	Alfonso Que (PHI)	27.61
9	Vincent Ng (SIN)	27.60
10	Erdenesürengiin Ganbat (MGL)	27.59
11	Munehisa Takayama (JPN)	27.56
12	Dương Duy Kiếm (VIE)	27.51
13	Wong Si Wa (MAC)	27.45
14	Dmitriy Kolokolnikov (KAZ)	26.89
15	Sunil Shakya (NEP)	26.64
16	Habib Zareei (IRI)	26.57
	Mohammad Hossein Farshbaf (IRI)	
	Kumpol Janvangthong (THA)	
