= Wushu at the 1998 Asian Games – Men's nanquan =

Men's nanquan at the 1998 Asian Games
- Venue: Thammasat Gymnasium 6
- Dates: 17 December 1998
- Competitors: 11 from 10 nations

Medalists
gold medal	Lang Rongbiao	China
silver medal	Leung Yat Ho	Hong Kong
bronze medal	Voradej Puangthong	Thailand
bronze medal	Ho Ro Bin	Malaysia
bronze medal	Picasso Tan	Singapore

The men's nanquan competition at the 1998 Asian Games in Bangkok, Thailand, was held on 17 December at the Thammasat Gymnasium 6.

== Schedule ==
All times are Indochina Time (UTC+07:00)

Date	Time	Event
Thursday, 17 December 1998	20:00	Final

== Results ==
Rank	Athlete	Score
1st place, gold medalist(s)	Lang Rongbiao (CHN)	9.51
2nd place, silver medalist(s)	Leung Yat Ho (HKG)	9.38
3rd place, bronze medalist(s)	Voradej Puangthong (THA)	9.30
3rd place, bronze medalist(s)	Ho Ro Bin (MAS)	9.30
3rd place, bronze medalist(s)	Picasso Tan (SIN)	9.30
6	Lee Chin-hui (TPE)	9.26
7	Leong Hong Man (MAC)	9.21
8	Cheng Ka Ho (HKG)	9.20
9	Yuji Hirai (JPN)	9.20
10	Ochirbatyn Tüvshintögs (MGL)	9.15
11	Binod Lama (NEP)	9.00
