= Lei Fei =

Chinese wushu practitioner

Personal information
- Born: Guangxi, China
- Occupation(s): Athlete, martial artist, actor, entrepreneur

Sport
- Sport: Wushu
- Event(s): Nanquan, Jianshu, Qiangshu
- Team: Macau Wushu Team
Medal record
Representing Macau
Women's Wushu Taolu
World Championships
Gold medal – first place	1995 Baltimore	Nanquan
Gold medal – first place	1999 Hong Kong	Qiangshu
Silver medal – second place	1995 Baltimore	Jianshu
Silver medal – second place	1999 Hong Kong	Jianshu
Silver medal – second place	1999 Hong Kong	Nanquan
Asian Games
Silver medal – second place	1994 Hiroshima	Nanquan
Silver medal – second place	1998 Bangkok	Nanquan

Lei Fei (Chinese: 李菲; pinyin: Lǐ fēi; known professionally as Jewel Lee; born: March 3, 1975) is an actor, businesswoman, and a retired professional wushu taolu athlete from Macau.

== Life ==
=== Wushu career ===
Born in Guangxi, Lei was transferred to Macau to develop the country's status in the international competitive wushu circuit. Her first major international appearance was at the 1994 Asian Games in Hiroshima, Japan, where she won the silver medal in women's nanquan, the first silver medal for Macau at the Asian Games. A year later, she competed in the 1995 World Wushu Championships in Baltimore, United States, where she won a silver medal in qiangshu and was the world champion in nanquan. Three years later, she competed in the 1998 Asian Games in Bangkok, Thailand, and won another silver medal in women's changquan. Her last competition was at the 1999 World Wushu Championships where she was a triple medalist and a world champion in qiangshu.

=== Acting and entrepreneurial career ===
In 1996, Lei was the runner-up Miss Macau. After retiring from competitive wushu, she started to develop her career as a film and television actor. She took on various small roles in films throughout Hong Kong and Macau, and was hailed as the successor to Michelle Yeoh. In 2001, she graduated from Australia's Macquarie University with degrees in international finance and corporate management. After graduating, she joined the Shenzhen Sannuo Group Company, becoming its vice-president in 2008.

== See also ==
- List of Asian Games medalists in wushu
