= Chen Sitan =

Chinese wushu practitioner

Personal information
- Nickname: 太极王子 "Prince of Taiji"
- Born: 1967 (age 58–59) Fujian, China
- Occupation(s): Athlete, coach

Sport
- Sport: Wushu
- Event: Taijiquan
- Team: Fujian Wushu Team (1975-1997)
Medal record
Representing China
Men's Wushu Taolu
World Championships
Gold medal – first place	1993 Kuala Lumpur	Taijiquan
Gold medal – first place	1997 Rome	Taijiquan
Asian Games
Gold medal – first place	1990 Beijing	Taijiquan

Chen Sitan (Chinese: 陈思坦; pinyin: Chénsītǎn; born 1967) is a Chinese-American taijiquan practitioner and a retired professional wushu taolu athlete.

== Career ==
In 1977, Chen was selected to become a member of the Fujian Provincial Wushu Team under Zeng Nailiang. At the 1990 Asian Games, Chen won the first gold medal for China in men's taijiquan. He then went on to become a two-time world champion, doing so at the 1993 and the 1997 World Wushu Championships. He also won the gold medal in taijiquan at the 1997 National Games of China.

Chen retired from competitive wushu in 1997 and became a coach. In 2004, he moved to the United States to establish his school, Sitan Tai Chi and Martial Arts, in New York City. He is also the chairman of the American Tai Chi Qigong Center.

== See also ==
- List of Asian Games medalists in wushu
