= Wushu at the 1998 Asian Games – Women's taijiquan =

Women's taijiquan at the 1998 Asian Games
- Venue: Thammasat Gymnasium 6
- Dates: 18 December 1998
- Competitors: 10 from 7 nations

Medalists
gold medal	Gao Jiamin	China
silver medal	Fan Xueping	China
bronze medal	Jainab	Indonesia

The women's taijiquan competition at the 1998 Asian Games in Bangkok, Thailand was held on 18 December at Thammasat University.

== Schedule ==
All times are Indochina Time (UTC+07:00)

Date	Time	Event
Friday, 18 December 1998	20:00	Final

== Results ==
Rank	Athlete	Score
1st place, gold medalist(s)	Gao Jiamin (CHN)	9.56
2nd place, silver medalist(s)	Fan Xueping (CHN)	9.43
3rd place, bronze medalist(s)	Jainab (INA)	9.30
4	Lan Hsiao-chien (TPE)	9.28
5	Emi Akazawa (JPN)	9.20
6	Hsieh Jen-yi (TPE)	9.18
7	Tomoko Takahashi (JPN)	9.18
7	Tan Mui Buay (SIN)	9.18
9	Jennifer Li (PHI)	9.16
10	Angie Tsang (HKG)	9.16
