= Tan Mui Buay =

Singaporean wushu practitioner

Personal information
- Born: 1955 (age 70–71)

Sport
- Sport: Wushu
- Event(s): Taijiquan, Taijijian
- Team: Singapore Wushu Team
Medal record
Women's Wushu Taolu
Representing Singapore
Asian Games
Bronze medal – third place	1994 Hiroshima	Taijiquan
Asian Championships
Bronze medal – third place	1996 Manila	Taijiquan
Bronze medal – third place	1996 Manila	Taijijian
SEA Games
Gold medal – first place	1993 Singapore	Taijiquan
Silver medal – second place	1991 Manila	Taijiquan
Bronze medal – third place	1997 Jakarta	Taijiquan

Tan Mui Buay (Chinese: 陈美郿; pinyin: Chénměiméi) is a retired competitive wushu taolu athlete and taijiquan practitioner and teacher from Singapore.

== Career ==
In 1986, Tan started taijiquan due to natural curiosity and made her international debut at the 1989 Asian Wushu Championships where she competed in taijiquan. Two years later, Tan competed at the 1991 SEA Games and won the silver medal in taijiquan.

In 1993, Tan competed in the 1993 SEA Games and won the gold medal in taijiquan. The following year, Tan appeared at the 1994 Asian Games and won the bronze medal in women's taijiquan, one of the first medals for Singapore in wushu at the Asian Games.

In 1996, Tan won two bronze medals in taijiquan and taijijian at the 1996 Asian Wushu Championships. A year later, she won another bronze medal in taijiquan at the 1997 SEA Games. Her last international competition was at the 1998 Asian Games where she finished 7th in women's taijiquan.

During her competitive career Tan worked as a computer technician at Nanyang Polytechnic, and after her competitive wushu career began to teach taijiquan.

== See also ==
- List of Asian Games medalists in wushu
