= Wushu at the 1990 Asian Games – Men's nanquan =

Men's nanquan at the 1990 Asian Games
- Venue: Haidian Gymnasium
- Dates: 1 October 1990

Medalists
gold medal	He Qiang	China
silver medal	Leung Yat Ho	Hong Kong
bronze medal	Wong Tong Ieong	Macau

The men's nanquan competition at the 1990 Asian Games in Beijing, China was held on 1 October 1990 the Haidian Gymnasium.

== Results ==
* The results are incomplete.

Rank	Athlete	Score
1st place, gold medalist(s)	He Qiang (CHN)	9.80
2nd place, silver medalist(s)	Leung Yat Ho (HKG)	9.65
3rd place, bronze medalist(s)	Wong Tong Leong (MAC)	9.58
4	Huang Shaoxiong (CHN)	9.51
5	Lu Chien-hua (TPE)	9.25
6	Lou Kuok Meng (MAC)	9.18
7	Lee Chun-hui (TPE)	9.18
8	Chan Pang Fai (HKG)	
9	Wu Xin Yi (PHI)	9.13
10	Tan Yeow Kuan (SIN)	
12	Takeshi Takaura (JPN)	8.98
