= Wushu at the 1998 Asian Games – Women's nanquan =

Women's nanquan at the 1998 Asian Games
- Venue: Thammasat Gymnasium 6
- Dates: 17 December 1998
- Competitors: 9 from 7 nations

Medalists
gold medal	Ng Siu Ching	Hong Kong
silver medal	Lei Fei	Macau
bronze medal	Cho Yu-chiao	Chinese Taipei

The women's nanquan competition at the 1998 Asian Games in Bangkok, Thailand, was held on 17 December at the Thammasat Gymnasium 6.

== Schedule ==
All times are Indochina Time (UTC+07:00)

Date	Time	Event
Thursday, 17 December 1998	20:00	Final

== Results ==
Rank	Athlete	Score
1st place, gold medalist(s)	Ng Siu Ching (HKG)	9.45
2nd place, silver medalist(s)	Lei Fei (MAC)	9.40
3rd place, bronze medalist(s)	Cho Yu-chiao (TPE)	9.31
4	Nguyễn Phương Lan (VIE)	9.30
5	Sachiko Akutsu (JPN)	9.26
6	Chong Sao Lan (MAC)	9.13
7	Voon Keh Li (MAS)	9.11
8	Mui Suet Ying (HKG)	9.10
9	Chanya Samutavanich (THA)	9.00
