= Wushu at the 1990 Asian Games – Women's nanquan =

Women's nanquan at the 1990 Asian Games
- Venue: Haidian Gymnasium
- Dates: 29 September 1990
- Competitors: 14 from 10 nations

Medalists
gold medal	Chen Lihong	China
silver medal	Liang Yanhua	China
bronze medal	Noriko Katsube	Japan

The women's nanquan competition at the 1990 Asian Games in Beijing, China was held on 29 September at the Haidian Gymnasium.

== Results ==
* The results are incomplete.

Rank	Athlete	Score
1st place, gold medalist(s)	Chen Lihong (CHN)	9.80
2nd place, silver medalist(s)	Liang Yanhua (CHN)	9.56
3rd place, bronze medalist(s)	Noriko Katsube (JPN)	9.35
4	Ou Hsiao-ling (TPE)	9.31
5	Cho Yu-chiao (TPE)	9.21
6	Park Jeong (KOR)	9.05
