= Wushu at the 1998 Asian Games – Men's taijiquan =

Men's taijiquan at the 1998 Asian Games
- Venue: Thammasat Gymnasium 6
- Dates: 16 December 1998
- Competitors: 7 from 7 nations

Medalists
gold medal	Chan Ming-shu	Chinese Taipei
silver medal	Toshiya Watanabe	Japan
bronze medal	Nguyễn Anh Minh	Vietnam

The men's taijiquan competition at the 1998 Asian Games in Bangkok, Thailand was held on 16 December at the Thammasat Gymnasium 6.

== Schedule ==
All times are Indochina Time (UTC+07:00)

Date	Time	Event
Wednesday, 16 December 1998	14:00	Final

== Results ==
Rank	Athlete	Score
1st place, gold medalist(s)	Chan Ming-shu (TPE)	9.46
2nd place, silver medalist(s)	Toshiya Watanabe (JPN)	9.33
3rd place, bronze medalist(s)	Nguyễn Anh Minh (VIE)	9.28
4	Bobby Co (PHI)	9.25
5	Ho Man Leok (MAC)	9.25
6	Phua Kok Loong (SIN)	9.23
7	Wong Chi Kwong (HKG)	9.20
