= Wangkhem Sandhyarani Devi =

Indian martial art athlete from Manipur

Sandhyarani Devi Wangkhem
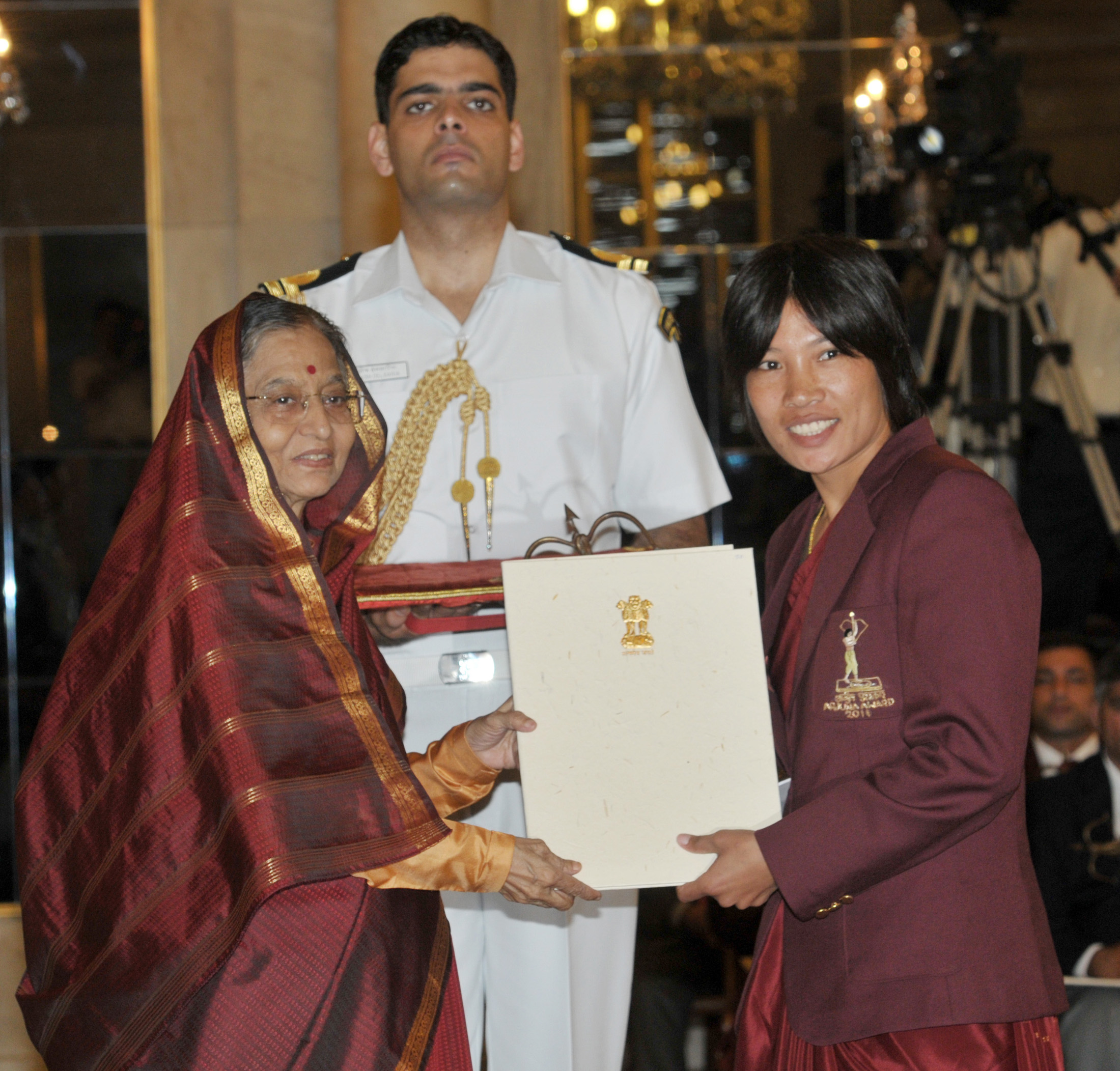
- The President Pratibha Devisingh Patil presenting the Arjuna Award for the year-2011 to Wangkhem Sandhyarani Devi for Wushu.

Personal information
- Nationality: Indian
- Born: 1 February 1983 (age 43) Manipur, India
- Weight: 60 kg (132 lb)

Sport
- Country: India
- Sport: Wushu
- Event: Sanda
Medal record
Women's Sanda
Representing India
World Championships
Bronze medal – third place	2013 Kuala Lumpur	60 kg
Asian Games
Silver medal – second place	2010 Guangzhou	60 kg
Asian Martial Arts Games
Silver medal – second place	2009 Bangkok	56 kg

Sandhyarani Devi Wangkhem (born 1 February 1983) is an Indian martial art athlete from Manipur, who participates in Women's Sanshou (Wushu) 56 kg category.

Sandhyarani won a Silver medal at the 2010 Asian Games in Guangzhou, China. Fighting with a calf injury, she was defeated by Iranian Khadijeh Azadpour, who was the defending champion in 60 kg category. She had sustained the injury in the semi-final win against Laos' Paloy Barckkam, due to this her kicking ability was severely hampered and she had to play defensively. Sandhyarani fought in 60 kg category as the 56 kg category was not included in the games schedule.

She has previously won a Bronze medal in 2008 Asian Championships in Macau and Silver medal at 2009 Asian Martial Arts Games in Women's Sanshou 56 kg.

Sandhyarani is a Central Reserve Police Force constable and hails from eastern state of Manipur. She belongs to the Thoubal district where the freestyle form of Sanshou is popular. Sandhyarani was a boxer but later shifted to Wushu since it was more all-round.
