= East Asian Games =

Multi-sport event

- Abbreviation: EAG
- Purpose: Multi-sport event for nations in East Asia
- Frequency: Every 4 years
- Inaugurated: 1993 East Asian Games in Shanghai, China
- Most recent: 2013 East Asian Games in Tianjin, China

The East Asian Games was a multi-sport event organized by the East Asian Games Association and held every four years from 1993 to 2013. Among those who competed included athletes from East Asian countries and territories of the Olympic Council of Asia, as well as the Pacific island nation of Guam, which is a member of the Oceania National Olympic Committees.

The East Asian Games was one of five subregional Games of the Olympic Council of Asia. The others are the Central Asian Games, the South Asian Games, the Southeast Asian Games, and the West Asian Games.

It ended after the 2013 tournament, the games later transforming into East Asian Youth Games, with Mongolia's Ulaanbaatar hosting the inaugural edition.

== Participating nations ==
All 8 countries whose National Olympic Committee is recognized by the East Asian Games Association and 1 country whose National Olympic Committee is recognized by the Oceania National Olympic Committees.

- China
- Guam
- Hong Kong
- Japan
- Macau
- Mongolia
- North Korea
- South Korea
- Chinese Taipei

Kazakhstan is a former member of the EAGA. It now participates in the Central Asian Games.

== List of East Asian Games ==
Edition	Year	Host city	Host nation	Opened by	Start Date	End Date	Nations	Competitors	Sports	Events	Top Placed Team
1	1993	Shanghai	China	President Jiang Zemin	9 May	18 May	8	1,021	12	170	China (CHN)
2	1997	Busan	South Korea	President Kim Young-sam	10 May	19 May	10	1,283	13	199	China (CHN)
3	2001	Osaka	Japan	Prince Takamado	19 May	27 May	10	2,804	15	201	China (CHN)
4	2005	Macau	Macau, China	Vice Premier Wu Yi	29 October	6 November	9	1,919	17	235	China (CHN)
5	2009	Hong Kong	Hong Kong, China	State Councilor Liu Yandong	5 December	13 December	9	2,377	22	262	China (CHN)
6	2013	Tianjin	China	Vice Premier Liu Yandong	6 October	15 October	9	2,422	24	254	China (CHN)

== Medal count ==
Of the 10 National Olympic Committees participating throughout the history of the Games, all nations have won at least a single medal in the competition. 9 nations have won at least a single gold medal.

Rank	Nation	Gold	Silver	Bronze	Total
1	China (CHN)	626	396	285	1,307
2	Japan (JPN)	288	326	395	1,009
3	South Korea (KOR)	209	256	321	786
4	Chinese Taipei (TPE)	57	139	188	384
5	Hong Kong (HKG)	43	54	105	202
6	Kazakhstan (KAZ)	37	30	48	115
7	North Korea (PRK)	30	50	77	157
8	Macau (MAC)	23	30	53	106
9	Mongolia (MGL)	5	14	82	101
10	Guam (GUM)	0	1	4	5
Totals (10 entries)		1,318	1,296	1,558	4,172

^{1}Former member

== Sports ==
30 sports were competed in at the East Asian Games, including the 2013 edition in Tianjin.

- Aquatics
  - Diving
  - Swimming
  - Synchronized swimming
- Athletics
- Badminton
- Baseball
- Basketball
- Bowling
- Boxing
- Cue sports
- Cycling
- Dancesport
- Dragon boat
- Fencing
- Football
- Gymnastics
- Handball
- Hockey
- Judo
- Karate
- Rowing
- Rugby sevens
- Shooting
- Squash
- Table tennis
- Taekwondo
- Tennis
  - Tennis
  - Soft tennis
- Volleyball
  - Volleyball
- Weightlifting
- Windsurfing
- Wrestling
- Wushu

== See also ==
- Events of the OCA (Continental)
  - Asian Games
  - Asian Winter Games
  - Asian Youth Games
  - Asian Beach Games
  - Asian Indoor and Martial Arts Games
- Events of the OCA (Subregional)
  - Central Asian Games
  - East Asian Youth Games
  - South Asian Games
  - Southeast Asian Games
  - West Asian Games
- Events of the APC (Continental)
  - Asian Para Games
  - Asian Winter Para Games
  - Asian Youth Para Games
  - Asian Youth Winter Para Games
- Events of the APC (Subregional)
  - ASEAN Para Games
