= Naoko Masuda =

Japanese wushu practitioner

Sport
- Sport: Wushu
- Event: Taijiquan
Medal record
Representing Japan
Women's Wushu Taolu
World Championships
Gold medal – first place	1993 Kuala Lumpur	Taijiquan
Silver medal – second place	1991 Beijing	Taijiquan
Asian Games
Silver medal – second place	1994 Hiroshima	Taijiquan
Asian Championships
Silver medal – second place	1989 Hong Kong	Taijiquan

Naoko Masuda is a former taijiquan athlete from Japan. Her first international victory was a silver medal in taijiquan at the 1989 Asian Wushu Championships. She then won a silver medal at the 1991 World Wushu Championships and two years later, she became first Japanese female athlete to become a world champion in taijiquan at the 1993 World Wushu Championships. She also won the silver medal in women's taijiquan at the 1994 Asian Games.

== See also ==
- List of Asian Games medalists in wushu
