= 1993 East Asian Games =

Multi-sport event in Shanghai, China

I East Asian Games
- Host city: Shanghai, China
- Nations: 8
- Athletes: 1021
- Events: 12 sports
- Opening: May 9, 1993
- Closing: May 18, 1993
- Opened by: President Jiang Zemin
- Main venue: Hongkou Football Stadium

The 1st East Asian Games were held in Shanghai, People's Republic of China from 9 to18 May 1993. The main stadium for the inaugural edition of the games was the Hongkou Football Stadium.

Shanghai also hosted a number of sports-themed exhibitions to coincide with the games, including exhibitions of photography, art and stamps. A total of 9 nations competed across twelve sports. Julio Iglesias and Wei Wei performed a duet at the games closing ceremony. The hosts, China, topped the medal table, winning almost two-thirds of the gold medals on offer and 40% of the overall total of 534 medal. Japan was the second-most successful nation, winning 25 gold medals.

== Sports ==
- Athletics
- Badminton
- Basketball
- Bowling
- Boxing
- Football
- Gymnastics
- Judo
- Rowing
- Swimming
- Weightlifting
- Wushu

== Medal table ==
* Host nation (China)

Rank	Nation	Gold	Silver	Bronze	Total
1	China (CHN)*	105	74	34	213
2	Japan (JPN)	25	37	55	117
3	South Korea (KOR)	23	28	40	91
4	North Korea (PRK)	10	20	24	54
5	Chinese Taipei (TPE)	6	5	19	30
6	Hong Kong (HKG)	1	2	8	11
7	Mongolia (MGL)	0	1	16	17
8	Macau (MAC)	0	0	1	1
Totals (8 entries)		170	167	197	534
