= Macau at the 1994 Asian Games =

- IOC code: MAC
- NOC: Macau Sports and Olympic Committee

in Hiroshima
- Medals Ranked 26th: Gold 0 Silver 1 Bronze 1 Total 2

Asian Games appearances (overview)
- 1990; 1994; 1998; 2002; 2006; 2010; 2014; 2018; 2022; 2026

Macau participated in the 1994 Asian Games held in Hiroshima from October 2, 1994, to October 16, 1994. Macau was ranked in 26th place, tied with Sri Lanka.
