= Wushu at the SEA Games =

Wushu has been contested at the SEA Games since 1991 in Manila, Philippines, with the exceptions of the 1995 and 1999 editions.

== Editions ==
Games	Year	Host city	Best Nation
XVI	1991	(Philippines) Manila	Philippines
XVII	1993	Singapore	Singapore
XIX	1997	(Indonesia) Jakarta	Indonesia
XXI	2001	(Malaysia) Kuala Lumpur	Malaysia
XXII	2003	(Vietnam) Hanoi & Ho Chi Minh	Vietnam
XXIII	2005	(Philippines) Manila	Philippines
XXIV	2007	(Thailand) Nakhon Ratchasima	Vietnam
XXV	2009	(Laos) Vientiane	Vietnam
XXVI	2011	(Indonesia) Jakarta & Palembang	Indonesia
XXVII	2013	(Myanmar) Naypyidaw	Myanmar
XXVIII	2015	Singapore	Singapore
XXIX	2017	(Malaysia) Kuala Lumpur	Malaysia
XXX	2019	(Philippines) Pasay	Philippines
XXXI	2021	(Vietnam) Hanoi	Vietnam
XXXII	2023	(Cambodia) Phnom Penh	Indonesia

== Medal table ==
From 1997-2023:

Rank	Nation	Gold	Silver	Bronze	Total
1	Vietnam (VIE)	78	59	55	192
2	Philippines (PHI)	48	34	36	118
3	Indonesia (INA)	42	51	47	140
4	Malaysia (MAS)	35	31	45	111
5	Myanmar (MYA)	23	37	47	107
6	Singapore (SIN)	22	23	24	69
7	Thailand (THA)	9	8	35	52
8	Laos (LAO)	6	8	23	37
9	Brunei (BRU)	5	5	9	19
10	Cambodia (CAM)	1	3	12	16
Totals (10 entries)		269	259	333	861

== Statistics ==
=== Multiple gold medalists ===
Rank	Athlete	Country	From	To	Gold	Silver	Bronze	Total
1	Dương Thúy Vi	Vietnam	2013		7	2	3	12
2	Nguyễn Thúy Hiền	Vietnam	1997	2003	7	1	-	8
3	Willy Wang	Philippines	2001	2007	6	1	1	8
4	Agatha Wong	Philippines	2017	2023	5	2	-	7
5	Jennifer Yeo	Philippines	1991	1993	5	1	-	6
5	Lindswell Kwok	Indonesia	2009	2017	5	1	-	6
7	Phạm Quốc Khánh	Vietnam	2007	2021	4	6	2	12
8	Achmad Hulaefi	Indonesia	2011	2017	4	3	1	8
9	Nguyễn Thị Mỹ Đức	Vietnam	2001	2005	4	2	1	7
10	Diana Bong	Malaysia	2009	2017	4	-	2	6

=== Multiple medalists ===
Rank	Athlete	Country	From	To	Gold	Silver	Bronze	Total
1	Dương Thúy Vi	Vietnam	2013		7	2	3	12
2	Phạm Quốc Khánh	Vietnam	2007	2021	4	6	2	12
3	Susyana Tjhan	Indonesia	2001	2011	3	4	2	9
4	Nguyễn Thúy Hiền	Vietnam	1997	2003	7	1	-	8
5	Willy Wang	Philippines	2001	2007	6	1	1	8
6	Achmad Hulaefi	Indonesia	2011	2017	4	3	1	8
