= Wushu at the 1994 Asian Games – Men's changquan combined =

Men's changquan combined at the 1994 Asian Games
- Venue: Aki Ward Sports Center
- Dates: 12–14 October 1994
- Competitors: 18 from 13 nations

Medalists
gold medal	Yuan Wenqing	China
silver medal	Park Chan-dae	South Korea
bronze medal	Hiroshi Yoshida	Japan

The men's changquan competition at the 1994 Asian Games in Hiroshima, Japan was held from 12 to 14 October at the Aki Ward Sports Center.

== Schedule ==
All times are Japan Standard Time (UTC+09:00)

Date	Time	Event
Wednesday, 12 October 1994	13:00	Short weapon
Thursday, 13 October 1994	13:00	Changquan
Friday, 14 October 1994	13:00	Long weapon

== Results ==
Rank	Athlete	Short weapon		Changquan	Long weapon		Total
Rank	Athlete	Dao	Jian	Changquan	Gun	Qiang	Total
1st place, gold medalist(s)	Yuan Wenqing (CHN)	9.78		9.80	9.80		29.38
2nd place, silver medalist(s)	Park Chan-dae (KOR)	9.50		9.60	9.56		28.66
3rd place, bronze medalist(s)	Hiroshi Yoshida (JPN)	9.58		9.56	9.50		28.64
4	Hideo Ninomiya (JPN)	9.56		9.53	9.50		28.59
5	Sae-Tem Sa-Art (MAC)	9.53		9.51		9.55	28.59
6	Choy Yeen Onn (MAS)		9.43	9.60	9.55		28.58
7	Ng Wa Loi (MAC)	9.51		9.41	9.48		28.40
8	Vincent Ng (SIN)		9.35	9.45	9.48		28.28
9	Tang Cheng-lun (TPE)	9.41		9.41	9.40		28.22
10	Lester Pimentel (PHI)		9.40	9.41	9.40		28.21
11	Erdenesürengiin Ganbat (MGL)		9.33	9.40		9.45	28.18
12	Chow Kam Onn (MAS)	9.26		9.41	9.48		28.15
13	Dương Duy Kiếm (VIE)	9.05		9.30		9.35	27.70
14	Ayurzanagiin Hatanbat (MGL)	9.15		9.20	9.20		27.55
15	Rajesh Lama (NEP)	9.10		9.20	8.95		27.25
16	Kwok Sui Lung (HKG)	9.08		9.03	8.96		27.07
17	Nguyễn Hoàng Hải (VIE)		9.25	9.00	8.81		27.06
18	Eko Saphuan (INA)	9.08		8.95		8.95	26.98
