= Wushu at the 1993 SEA Games =

- Venue: Yio Chu Kang Sports Hall
- Dates: June 14-16, 1993

Wushu at the 1993 Southeast Asian Games was held at the Yio Chu Kang Sports Hall in Singapore from June 14 to 16, 1993.

== Medal table ==
* Host nation (Singapore)

Rank	Nation	Gold	Silver	Bronze	Total
1	Singapore (SIN)*	7	6	5	18
2	Philippines (PHI)	6	3	1	10
3	Malaysia (MAS)	1	3	0	4
4	Vietnam (VIE)	0	0	1	1
Totals (4 entries)		14	12	7	33

== Medalists ==
=== Men's taolu ===
Event	Gold	Silver	Bronze
Changquan	Vincent Ng; Singapore	Choy Yeen Onn; Malaysia	unknown
Daoshu	Joseph Wuxinyi; Philippines	Picasso Tan; Singapore	unknown
Gunshu	unknown	Vincent Ng; Singapore	unknown
Jianshu	Choy Yeen Onn; Malaysia	Vincent Ng; Singapore	Samson Co; Philippines
Qiangshu	Quek Soon Tuck; Singapore; Samson Co; Philippines	unknown	Lee Kok Heng; Singapore
Nanquan	Picasso Tan; Singapore	Poon Chee Kong; Malaysia	Quek Chun Yang; Singapore
Taijiquan	Daniel Go; Philippines	Puan Jooi Eong; Singapore	unknown

=== Women's talou ===
Event	Gold	Silver	Bronze
Changquan	Jennifer Yeo; Philippines	Chiew Hui Yan; Singapore	Chua Sze May; Singapore
Daoshu	Catherine Hau; Philippines	unknown	unknown
Gunshu	Jennifer Yeo; Philippines	unknown	Tan Sock Ching; Singapore
Jianshu	Chiew Hui Yan; Singapore	Jennifer Yeo; Philippines	unknown
Qiangshu	Chiew Hui Yan; Singapore	Mian-Mian Shi; Philippines	Chua Sze May; Singapore
Nanquan	Tan Sock Ching; Singapore	Ng Choo Bee; Malaysia	Tran Hoai Thu; Vietnam
Taijiquan	Tan Mui Buay; Singapore	Joanne Teo; Singapore; Rosaria Maria Dijamco; Philippines	unknown
