= Juanita Mok =

Chinese wushu practitioner

Personal information
- Born: Mok Uen Ying; July 13, 1995 (age 31)
- Height: 1.56 m (5 ft 1 in)
- Weight: 48 kg (106 lb)

Sport
- Sport: Wushu
- Events: Taijiquan, Taijijian
- Team: Hong Kong Wushu Team
- Coached by: Li Fai
Medal record
Women's Wushu Taolu
Representing Hong Kong
World Games Series
Bronze medal – third place	2024 Hong Kong	Taijiquan+Taijijian
World Championships
Silver medal – second place	2019 Shanghai	Taijijian
World University Championships
Gold medal – first place	2018 Macau	Taijijian
Silver medal – second place	2018 Macau	Taijiquan
Summer Universiade
Bronze medal – third place	2017 Zhubei	Taijiquan+Taijijian
Asian Games
Silver medal – second place	2018 Jakarta-Palembang	Taijiquan
Asian Championships
Silver medal – second place	2024 Macau	Taijiquan
World Junior Championships
Gold medal – first place	2010 Singapore	Taijiquan B
Gold medal – first place	2010 Singapore	Taijijian B
Silver medal – second place	2008 Bali	Taijijian B
Bronze medal – third place	2008 Bali	Taijiquan B
Asian Junior Championships
Gold medal – first place	2013 Manila	Taijiquan B
Gold medal – first place	2013 Manila	Taijijian B

Juanita Mok (Chinese: 莫宛螢; pinyin: Mò wǎn yíng; born July 13, 1995) is a taijiquan athlete from Hong Kong. She won silver medals in women's taijiquan and taijijian combined at the 2018 Asian Games and in taijijian at the 2019 World Wushu Championships. She is also a double gold medalist at the World Junior Wushu Championships.

After the COVID-19 pandemic, she competed in the 2024 Asian Wushu Championships where she won a silver medal in taijiquan. Shortly after at the 2024 World Games Series she achieved a bronze medal in taijiquan.

== See also ==
- List of Asian Games medalists in wushu
