= Park Chan-dae =

Park Chan-dae may refer to:

- Park Chan-dae (wushu)
- Park Chan-dae (politician)
