= Natalie Chriselda Tanasa =

Indonesian wushu practitioner

Personal information
- Born: December 22, 1993 (age 32) Surabaya, Indonesia

Sport
- Sport: Wushu
- Event(s): Changquan, Jianshu, Qiangshu, Duilian
- Team: Indonesia wushu team
- Retired: yes
Medal record
Women's wushu taolu
Representing Indonesia
Southeast Asian Games
Bronze medal – third place	2013 Naypyidaw	Duilian
World University Championships
Gold medal – first place	2018 Macau	Changquan
Gold medal – first place	2018 Macau	Jianshu
Bronze medal – third place	2018 Macau	Qiangshu
ASEAN University Games
Silver medal – second place	2014 Palembang	Changquan

Natalie Chriselda Tanasa (born December 22, 1993) is an Indonesian former wushu taolu athlete.

She won two gold medals and one bronze medal at the 2018 World University Championships in Macau, China. She won bronze medal at the 2013 Southeast Asian Games in Duilian discipline, with her partner Thalia Lovita Sosrodjojo. In 2021 she won one gold medal and one bronze medal at the National Sports Week. She is now a retired athlete and has been teaching at Da Sheng Yun Dong Guan.
