= Wushu at the 2013 SEA Games =

- Venue: Wunna Theikdi Indoor Stadium
- Dates: 7–10 December 2013

Wushu was contested by both men and women at the 2013 SEA Games at Wunna Theikdi Indoor Stadium, Naypyidaw, Myanmar between December 7–10.

== Medal summary ==
=== Medal table ===
* Host nation (Myanmar)

Rank	Nation	Gold	Silver	Bronze	Total
1	Myanmar*	5	5	5	15
2	Vietnam	5	3	4	12
3	Indonesia	4	3	6	13
4	Malaysia	3	5	6	14
5	Philippines	3	3	2	8
6	Singapore	1	2	2	5
7	Laos	1	0	1	2
8	Brunei	1	0	0	1
9	Thailand	0	2	1	3
10	Cambodia	0	0	1	1
Totals (10 entries)		23	23	28	74

== Medalists ==
=== Men's taolu ===
Event	Gold	Silver	Bronze
Changquan	Aung Si Thu; Myanmar	Achmad Hulaefi; Indonesia	Xuan Hiep Tran; Vietnam
Daoshu	Achmad Hulaefi; Indonesia	Nguyen Manh Quyen; Vietnam	Say Yoke Ng; Malaysia
Gunshu	Achmad Hulaefi; Indonesia	Say Yoke Ng; Malaysia	Aung Si Thu; Myanmar
Nanquan	Wai Phyo Aung; Myanmar	Mun Hua Ho; Malaysia	Soe Kyaw; Myanmar
Nangun	Quoc Khanh Pham; Vietnam	Soe Kyaw; Myanmar	Mun Hua Ho; Malaysia
Nandao	Wai Phyo Aung; Myanmar	Mun Hua Ho; Malaysia	Quoc Khanh Pham; Vietnam
Taijiquan / Taijijian	Daniel Parantac; Philippines	Nyein Chan Ko Ko; Myanmar	Tze Yuan Lee; Singapore
Barehand Duilian	Myanmar (MYA); Htet Han Kyaw; Sein Thiha Aung	Malaysia (MAS); Mun Hua Ho; Wong Weng Son; Yang Lee	Singapore (SIN); Tze Yuan Lee; Yi Xiang Yong
Weapons Duilian	Myanmar (MYA); Kyaw Zin Thit; Wai Phyo Aung	Philippines (PHI); Daniel Parantac; John Keithley Chan; Norlence Ardee Catolico	Thailand (THA); Baramee Kulsawadmongkol; Pitaya Sae Yang; Sujinda Sae Yang

=== Men's sanshou ===
Event	Gold	Silver	Bronze
48 kg	Jessie Aligaga; Philippines	Dasmantua Simbolon; Indonesia	Thein Hteik Oo; Myanmar
48 kg	Jessie Aligaga; Philippines	Dasmantua Simbolon; Indonesia	Van Bau To; Vietnam
52 kg	Dembert Arcita; Philippines	Phithak Paokrathok; Thailand	Rinda Luy; Cambodia
52 kg	Dembert Arcita; Philippines	Phithak Paokrathok; Thailand	Harba Sibuea; Indonesia
56 kg	Khamla Sou Khaphone; Laos	Tom Suepsangat; Thailand	Francisco Solis; Philippines
56 kg	Khamla Sou Khaphone; Laos	Tom Suepsangat; Thailand	Van Cao Hoang; Vietnam

=== Women's taolu ===
Event	Gold	Silver	Bronze
Changquan	Hoàng Thị Phương Giang; Vietnam	Yan Ni Tan; Singapore	Thalia Lovita Sosrodjojo; Indonesia
Jianshu	Dương Thúy Vi; Vietnam	Sandy Oo; Myanmar	Eyin Phoon; Malaysia
Quiangshu	Eyin Phoon; Malaysia	Dương Thúy Vi; Vietnam	Thalia Lovita Sosrodjojo; Indonesia
Nanquan	Diana Bong Siong Lin; Malaysia	Minh Phuong Bui; Vietnam	Cheau Xuen Tai; Malaysia
Nandao	Cheau Xuen Tai; Malaysia	Aint Mi Mi; Myanmar	Juwita Niza Wasni; Indonesia
Nangun	Juwita Niza Wasni; Indonesia	Ivana Ardelia Irmanto; Indonesia	Diana Bong Siong Lin; Malaysia
Taijiquan / Taijijian	Lindswell Kwok; Indonesia	Shin Yii Ng; Malaysia	Wai Mar Tun Thein; Myanmar
Barehand Duilian	Brunei (BRU); Faustina Woo Wai Sii; Lee Ying Shi	Singapore (SIN); Hui Xin Fung; Min Li Emily Sin; Wei Ting Zoe Mui	Philippines (PHI); Kariza Kris Chan; Nastasha Enriquez
Weapons Duilian	Singapore (SIN); Ling En Valerie Wee; Yan Ning Vera Ta	Myanmar (MYA); Aint Mi Mi; Sandy Oo	Indonesia (INA); Natalie Chriselda Tanasa; Thalia Lovita Sosrodjojo

=== Women's sanshou ===
Event	Gold	Silver	Bronze
48 kg	Thi Chinh Nguyen; Vietnam	Divine Wally; Philippines	Friska Ria Wibowo; Indonesia
48 kg	Thi Chinh Nguyen; Vietnam	Divine Wally; Philippines	Chi Leng Lim; Malaysia
52 kg	Thu Hoai Nguyen; Vietnam	Evita Elise Zamora; Philippines	Danusone Buddybuasisavath; Laos
52 kg	Thu Hoai Nguyen; Vietnam	Evita Elise Zamora; Philippines	Su Hlaing Oo; Myanmar

== Results ==
=== Men's taolu ===
==== Duilian (2 or 3 athletes With Weapon) ====
December 7

Rank	Athlete	Score
1st place, gold medalist(s)	Myanmar (MYA); Kyaw Zin Thit; Wai Phyo Aung	9.64
2nd place, silver medalist(s)	Philippines (PHI); Daniel Parantac; John Keithley Chan; Norlence Ardee Catolico	9.62
3rd place, bronze medalist(s)	Thailand (THA); Baramee Kulsawadmongkol; Pitaya Sae Yang; Sujinda Sae Yang	9.60
4	Singapore (SIN); Jesse Colin Adalia; Yi Xiang Yong; Zhe Xuan Etienne Lee	9.59
5	Indonesia (INA); Charles Sutanto; Eric Losardi; Jodis	9.58
6	Brunei (BRU); Md Sufi Shayiran Roslan; Mohammad Adi Sya'rani Roslan	9.55
7	Laos (LAO); Bountang Song; Khaisong Tongxuy; Syamphone Kongmane	9.41

==== Duilian (2 or 3 athletes Bare Hands) ====
December 8
Rank	Athlete	Score
1st place, gold medalist(s)	Myanmar (MYA); Htet Han Kyaw; Sein Thiha Aung	9.65
2nd place, silver medalist(s)	Malaysia (MAS); Mun Hua Ho; Weng Son Wong; Yang Lee	9.48
3rd place, bronze medalist(s)	Singapore (SIN); Tze Yuan Lee; Yi Xiang Yong	9.47
4	Cambodia (CAM); Rinda Luy; San An; Vannak Heng	9.39

==== Changquan ====
December 7
Rank	Athlete	Score
1st place, gold medalist(s)	Aung Si Thu (MYA)	9.70
2nd place, silver medalist(s)	Achmad Hulaefi (INA)	9.69
3rd place, bronze medalist(s)	Tran Xuan Hiep (VIE)	9.68
4	Nguyễn Mạnh Quyền (VIE)	9.67
5	Charles Sutanto (INA)	9.67
6	Thu Ya Soe (MYA)	9.66
7	Wai Kin Yeap (MAS)	9.65
8	John Keithley Chan (PHI)	9.64
9	Wong Weng Son (MAS)	9.64
10	Jesse Colin Adalia (SIN)	9.63
11	Yi Xiang Yong (SIN)	9.55
12	Sujinda Sae Yang (THA)	8.90
13	Mohammad Adi Sya'rani Roslan (BRU)	8.85
default	Norlence Ardee Catolico (PHI)	

==== Nanquan ====
December 8
Rank	Athlete	Score
1st place, gold medalist(s)	Wai Phyo Aung (MYA)	9.70
2nd place, silver medalist(s)	Mun Hua Ho (MAS)	9.68
3rd place, bronze medalist(s)	Soe Kyaw (MYA)	9.67
4	Phạm Quốc Khánh (VIE)	9.66
5	Pitaya Sae Yang (THA)	9.60
6	Hengki Setiawan (INA)	9.56
7	Baramee Kulsawadmongkol (THA)	9.56
8	Kevan Cheah Peng Heng (MAS)	9.54
9	Johannes Bie (INA)	9.51
10	Md Sufi Shayiran Roslan (BRU)	9.51
11	San An (CAM)	7.10

==== Nangun ====
December 10
Rank	Athlete	Score
1st place, gold medalist(s)	Phạm Quốc Khánh (VIE)	9.70
2nd place, silver medalist(s)	Soe Kyaw (MYA)	9.69
3rd place, bronze medalist(s)	Mun Hua Ho (MAS)	9.67
4	Eric Losardi (INA)	9.65
5	Kevan Cheah Peng Heng (MAS)	9.64
6	Md Sufi Shayiran Roslan (BRU)	9.61
7	Wai Phyo Aung (MYA)	9.37
8	Hengki Setiawan (INA)	9.19

==== Nandao ====
December 9
Rank	Athlete	Score
1st place, gold medalist(s)	Wai Phyo Aung (MYA)	9.69
2nd place, silver medalist(s)	Mun Hua Ho (MAS)	9.68
3rd place, bronze medalist(s)	Phạm Quốc Khánh (VIE)	9.67
4	Eric Losardi (INA)	9.66
5	Kevan Cheah Peng Heng (MAS)	9.63
6	Baramee Kulsawadmongkol (THA)	9.45
7	Soe Kyaw (MYA)	9.44
8	Johannes Bie (INA)	9.42
9	Pitaya Sae Yang (THA)	9.25
10	Md Sufi Shayiran Roslan (BRU)	9.12
11	San An (CAM)	7.10

==== Taijiquan ====
- Taijiquan — December 7
- Taijijian — December 10

Rank	Athlete	Taijiquan	Taijijian	Total
1st place, gold medalist(s)	Daniel Parantac (PHI)	9.70	9.68	19.38
2nd place, silver medalist(s)	Nyein Chan Ko Ko (MYA)	9.67	9.66	19.33
3rd place, bronze medalist(s)	Tze Yuan Lee (SIN)	9.65	9.65	19.30
4	Fredy (INA)	9.64	9.65	19.29
5	Choon How Loh (MAS)	9.57	9.67	19.24
6	Marthen Mardan Tangdilallo (INA)	9.66	9.54	19.20
7	Jack Chang Loh (MAS)	9.60	9.58	19.18
8	Nguyen Thanh Tung (VIE)	9.54	9.64	19.18

==== Daoshu ====
December 9
Rank	Athlete	Score
1st place, gold medalist(s)	Achmad Hulaefi (INA)	9.70
2nd place, silver medalist(s)	Nguyen Manh Quyen (VIE)	9.68
3rd place, bronze medalist(s)	Say Yoke Ng (MAS)	9.67
4	Tran Xuan Hiep (VIE)	9.66
5	Jun Lim Khaw (MAS)	9.64
6	Yi Xiang Yong (SIN)	9.63
7	Jesse Colin Adalia (SIN)	9.55
8	Aldy Lukman (INA)	9.38
9	Aung Si Thu (MYA)	9.26
10	Sujinda Sae Yang (THA)	9.14
11	Mohammad Adi Sya'rani Roslan (BRU)	9.10
default	Norlence Ardee Catolico (PHI)	
default	Kyaw Zin Thit (MYA)	
default	John Keithley Chan (PHI)	

==== Gunshu ====
December 8
Rank	Athlete	Score
1st place, gold medalist(s)	Achmad Hulaefi (INA)	9.70
2nd place, silver medalist(s)	Say Yoke Ng (MAS)	9.68
3rd place, bronze medalist(s)	Aung Si Thu (MYA)	9.67
4	Aldy Lukman (INA)	9.65
5	Jun Lim Khaw (MAS)	9.60
6	Yi Xiang Yong (SIN)	9.41
7	Kyaw Zin Thit (MYA)	9.35
8	Tran Xuan Hiep (VIE)	9.14
9	Mohammad Adi Sya'rani Roslan (BRU)	8.95
10	Nguyen Manh Quyen (VIE)	0.00
default	Norlence Ardee Catolico (PHI)	

=== Men's sanshou ===
==== 48 kg ====
Quarterfinal; December 07		Semifinal; December 08		Final; December 09
		Thein Hteik Oo (MYA)	1
Dasmantua Simbolon (INA)	2	Dasmantua Simbolon (INA)	2
Anan Singtong (THA)	1			Dasmantua Simbolon (INA)	0
To Van Bau (VIE)	2			Jessie Aligaga (PHI)	2
Boon Xuan Mok (MAS)	0	To Van Bau (VIE)	1
Jessie Aligaga (PHI)	2	Jessie Aligaga (PHI)	2
Chansamone (LAO)	0

==== 52 kg ====
Quarterfinal; December 07
Phithak Paokrathok (THA)	2
Phan Anh Thang (VIE)	0
Harba Sibuea (INA)	2
Tun Tun Win (MYA)	1
Dembert Arcita (PHI)	TV
Khanlaya Valasith (LAO)

Semifinal; December 08
Rinda Luy (CAM)
Phithak Paokrathok (THA)	TV
Harba Sibuea (INA)	0
Dembert Arcita (PHI)	2

Final; December 09
Phithak Paokrathok (THA)	0
Dembert Arcita (PHI)	2

==== 56 kg ====
Quarterfinal; December 07
Khamla Sou Khaphone (LAO)	TV
Vannak Heng (CAM)
Francisco Solis (PHI)	2
Rolando Pardomuan Siahaan (INA)	0
Tom Suepsangat (THA)	TV
Lui Meng Chong (MAS)
Hoang Van Cao (VIE)	2
Yar Su Maung (MYA)	0

Semifinal; December 08
Khamla Sou Khaphone (LAO)	2
Francisco Solis (PHI)	0
Tom Suepsangat (THA)	2
Hoang Van Cao (VIE)	0

Final; December 09
Khamla Sou Khaphone (LAO)	2
Tom Suepsangat (THA)	0

=== Women's taolu ===
==== Duilian (2 or 3 athletes Bare Hands) ====
December 9
Rank	Athlete	Score
1st place, gold medalist(s)	Brunei (BRU); Faustina Woo Wai Sii; Yingshi Lee	9.67
2nd place, silver medalist(s)	Singapore (SIN); Hui Xin Fung; Min Li Emily Sin; Wei Ting Zoe Mui	9.66
3rd place, bronze medalist(s)	Philippines (PHI); Kariza Kris Chan; Nastasha Enriquez	9.65
4	Myanmar (MYA); Aye Thit Sar Myint; Myat Thet Hsu Wai Phyo	9.55
5	Vietnam (VIE); Hoàng Thị Phương Giang; Dương Thúy Vi	9.54
6	Laos (LAO); Khamtavane Vorlabout; Poukky; Xunny Photihilath	9.42
Default	Malaysia (MAS); Diana Bong Siong Lin; Cheau Xuen Tai	

==== Duilian (2 or 3 athletes With Weapon) ====
December 10
Rank	Athlete	Score
1st place, gold medalist(s)	Singapore (SIN); Ling En Valerie Wee; Yan Ning Vera Tan	9.63
2nd place, silver medalist(s)	Myanmar (MYA); Aint Mi Mi; Sandy Oo	9.53
3rd place, bronze medalist(s)	Indonesia (INA); Thalia Lovita Sosrodjojo; Natalie Chriselda Tanasa	9.50

==== Changquan ====
December 8
Rank	Athlete	Score
1st place, gold medalist(s)	Hoàng Thị Phương Giang (VIE)	9.68
2nd place, silver medalist(s)	Yan Ni Tan (SIN)	9.60
3rd place, bronze medalist(s)	Thalia Lovita Sosrodjojo (INA)	9.59
4	Wei Ting Zoe Mui (SIN)	9.52
5	Dương Thúy Vi (VIE)	9.49
6	Yingshi Lee (BRU)	9.47
7	Eyin Phoon (MAS)	9.21
8	Myat Thet Hsu Wai Phyo (MYA)	9.11
9	Sandy Oo (MYA)	8.96
default	Natalie Chriselda Tanasa (INA)	

==== Nanquan ====
December 7
Rank	width=250	Score
1st place, gold medalist(s)	Diana Bong Siong Lin (MAS)	9.70
2nd place, silver medalist(s)	Bui Minh Phuong (VIE)	9.68
3rd place, bronze medalist(s)	Cheau Xuen Tai (MAS)	9.67
4	Juwita Niza Wasni Wasni (INA)	9.65
5	Aint Mi Mi (MYA)	9.39
6	Ivana Ardelia Irmanto (INA)	9.38
7	Aye Thit Sar Myint (MYA)	9.08
8	Min Li Emily Sin (SIN)	9.06
Default	Faustina Woo Wai Sii (BRU)	

==== Nandao ====
December 8
Rank	Athlete	Score
1st place, gold medalist(s)	Cheau Xuen Tai (MAS)	9.69
2nd place, silver medalist(s)	Aint Mi Mi (MYA)	9.67
3rd place, bronze medalist(s)	Juwita Niza Wasni (INA)	9.65
4	Ivana Ardelia Irmanto (INA)	9.63
5	Aye Thit Sar Myint (MYA)	9.45
6	Bui Minh Phuong (VIE)	9.42
7	Diana Bong Siong Lin (MAS)	9.23
8	Min Li Emily Sin (SIN)	9.19
default	Faustina Woo Wai Sii (BRU)	

==== Nangun ====
December 9
Rank	Athlete	Score
1st place, gold medalist(s)	Juwita Niza Wasni (INA)	9.64
2nd place, silver medalist(s)	Ivana Ardelia Irmanto (INA)	9.61
3rd place, bronze medalist(s)	Diana Bong Siong Lin (MAS)	9.49
4	Aye Thit Sar Myint (MYA)	9.45
5	Cheau Xuen Tai (MAS)	9.44
6	Bui Minh Phuong (VIE)	9.40
7	Min Li Emily Sin (SIN)	9.40
8	Aint Mi Mi (MYA)	9.19
default	Faustina Woo Wai Sii (BRU)	

==== Taijiquan ====
- Taijiquan — December 7
- Taijijian — December 8

Rank	Athlete	Taijiquan	Taijijian	Total
1st place, gold medalist(s)	Lindswell Kwok (INA)	9.71	9.71	19.42
2nd place, silver medalist(s)	Shin Yii Ng (MAS)	9.59	9.69	19.28
3rd place, bronze medalist(s)	Wai Mar Tun Thein (MYA)	9.68	9.58	19.26
4	Tran Thi Minh Huyen (VIE)	9.46	9.66	19.12
5	Ling En Valerie Wee (SIN)	9.63	9.49	19.12
6	Yan Ning Vera Tan (SIN)	9.24	9.62	18.86
7	Lu Yi Chan (MAS)	9.66	9.17	18.83
8	Guat Lian Ang (BRU)	9.01	8.59	17.60
9	Chansoriya Mao (CAM)	6.90	default	6.90

==== Jianshu ====
December 7
Rank	Athlete	Score
1st place, gold medalist(s)	Dương Thúy Vi (VIE)	9.70
2nd place, silver medalist(s)	Sandy Oo (MYA)	9.69
3rd place, bronze medalist(s)	Eyin Phoon (MAS)	9.46
4	Hui Xin Fung (SIN)	9.31
5	Thalia Lovita Sosrodjojo (INA)	9.27
6	Myat Thet Hsu Wai Phyo (MYA)	9.20
default	Natalie Chriselda Tanasa (INA)	
default	Yingshi Lee (BRU)	
default	Wei Ting Zoe Mui (SIN)	

==== Quiangshu ====
December 9
Rank	Athlete	Score
1st place, gold medalist(s)	Eyin Phoon (MAS)	9.67
2nd place, silver medalist(s)	Dương Thúy Vi (VIE)	9.59
3rd place, bronze medalist(s)	Thalia Lovita Sosrodjojo (INA)	9.40
4	Sandy Oo (MYA)	9.39
5	Myat Thet Hsu Wai Phyo (MYA)	8.98
default	Natalie Chriselda Tanasa (INA)	
default	Yingshi Lee (BRU)	
default	Hui Xin Fung (SIN)	
default	Wei Ting Zoe Mui (SIN)	

=== Women's sanshou ===
==== 48 kg ====
Quarterfinal; December 07		Semifinal; December 08		Final; December 09
Chi Leng Lim (MAS)	2
Chansoriya Mao (CAM)	0	Chi Leng Lim (MAS)	0
Divine Wally (PHI)	2	Divine Wally (PHI)	2
Suphisara Konlak (THA)	1			Divine Wally (PHI)	0
Friska Ria Wibowo (INA)	TV			Nguyen Thi Chinh (VIE)	2
War So Khaing (MYA)		Friska Ria Wibowo (INA)	0
Nguyen Thi Chinh (VIE)	2	Nguyen Thi Chinh (VIE)	2
Souay Chansy (LAO)	0

==== 52 kg ====
Quarterfinal; December 07		Semifinal; December 08		Final; December 09
		Su Hlaing Oo (MYA)	0
Nguyen Thu Hoai (VIE)	2	Nguyen Thu Hoai (VIE)	2
Selviah Pertiwi (INA)	0			Nguyen Thu Hoai (VIE)	2
				Evita Elise Zamora (PHI)	0
		Evita Elise Zamora (PHI)	2
		Danusone Buddybuasisavath (LAO)	0

Preceded by 2011	Wushu at the Southeast Asian Games; 2013 Southeast Asian Games	Succeeded by 2015
