= 1995 World Wushu Championships =

3rd edition of the World Wushu Championships

- Venue: Baltimore Arena (capacity: 11,100)
- Location: Baltimore, Maryland, United States
- Start date: August 19, 1995
- End date: August 22, 1995
- Competitors: 800 from 43 nations

The 1995 World Wushu Championships was the 3rd edition of the World Wushu Championships, and was held in Baltimore, United States of America from August 19 to August 22, 1995. This marked the first time a major international Wushu competition was held outside of Asia.

== Medal table ==
* Host nation (United States)

Rank	NOC	Gold	Silver	Bronze	Total
1	China	10	1	0	11
2	Hong Kong	3	0	1	4
3	Russia	3	0	0	3
4	Japan	2	6	3	11
5	South Korea	2	4	2	8
6	Macau	2	3	4	9
7	Malaysia	2	2	2	6
8	Philippines	2	1	3	6
9	Romania	2	0	0	2
10	Singapore	1	3	3	7
11	Tajikistan	1	0	0	1
11	Turkmenistan	1	0	0	1
13	United States*	0	2	4	6
13	Vietnam	0	2	4	6
15	Canada	0	1	2	3
16	Indonesia	0	1	0	1
16	Mongolia	0	1	0	1
18	Ukraine	0	0	1	1
Totals (18 entries)		31	27	29	87

== Medalists ==
=== Men's taolu ===
Event	Gold	Silver	Bronze
Changquan	Liu Haibo; China	Park Chan-dae; South Korea	Sai-Tem Sa-Art; Macau; Hiroshi Yoshida; Japan; Leong Yang Kong; Malaysia
Daoshu	Munehisa Takayama; Japan; Hiroshi Yoshida; Japan; Ng Cheng Hye; Singapore; Park Chan-dae; South Korea	Douglas Chin; Canada	Woody Wong; United States; Nathan Tong; United States
Gunshu	Lang Rongbiao; China	Park Chan-dae; South Korea; Hiroshi Yoshida; Japan	Ng Cheng Hye; Singapore
Jianshu	Lester Pimentel; Philippines	Alfonso Que; Philippines	Tangwing Shan; Canada
Qiangshu	Alfonso Que; Philippines; Sai-Tem Sa-Art; Macau	Woody Wong; United States	Tangwing Shan; Canada
Nanquan	Leung Yat Ho; Hong Kong	Chen Lun; China; Phoon Chee Kong; Malaysia; Yong Jae-kim; South Korea; Picasso Tan; Singapore	Yuji Hirai; Japan; Richard Ng; Philippines; Wong Si Long; Macau
Taijiquan	Wang Erping; China	Cheah Kok Luan; Malaysia; Park Chan-dae; South Korea; Tan Lye Huat; Singapore; Toshiya Watanabe; Japan	Leong Chong Leng; Macau; Nick Gracenin; United States; Seong Yang; South Korea

=== Women's taolu ===
Event	Gold	Silver	Bronze
Changquan	Lu Dan; China	Momi Matsmura; Japan; Natalie Lu; United States	Chiew Hui Yan; Singapore; Nguyễn Thúy Hiền; Vietnam; Nguyễn Thanh Loan; Vietnam
Daoshu	Liu Yanyan; China	Nguyễn Thúy Hiền; Vietnam	Nguyễn Phương Lan; Vietnam
Gunshu	Ng Choo Bee; Malaysia; Ahn Soon-kim; South Korea	Doyoddorjiin Ariuntögs; Mongolia	Catherine Hau; Philippines; Michelle Boutin; United States; Kadigrova; Ukraine; Tan Sock Ching; Singapore
Jianshu	Liu Shuhong; China	Lei Fei; Macau	Ng Siu Ching; Hong Kong
Qiangshu	Ng Siu Ching; Hong Kong	Yuri Kaminiwa; Japan	Mian-mian Shi; Philippines; Nguyễn Thúy Hiền; Vietnam
Nanquan	Ng Siu Ching; Hong Kong; Lei Fei; Macau	Nguyễn Phương Lan; Vietnam	Ahn Soon-kim; South Korea; Ng Choo Bee; Malaysia
Taijiquan	Fan Xueping; China	Ria Inque; Japan; Jainab; Indonesia; Joanne Teo; Singapore	Sam Pou Wa; Macau; Mayumi Fujinoto; Japan

=== Men's sanda ===
Event	Gold	Silver	Bronze
52 kg	Attila Gombos; Romania	None awarded	None awarded
56 kg	Ma Pengbin; China	None awarded	None awarded
60 kg	Chen Weigang; China	None awarded	None awarded
65 kg	Yu Bangmeng; China	None awarded	None awarded
70 kg	Abdulmutalib Shakhrukhanov; Russia	None awarded	None awarded
75 kg	Cossacks Gombos; Romania	None awarded	None awarded
80 kg	Ramazan Ramazanov; Russia	None awarded	None awarded
85 kg	Gaidukov Sagol; Turkmenistan	None awarded	None awarded
90 kg	Kazbek Zhaparov; Russia	None awarded	None awarded
+90 kg	Musayev Hasan; Tajikistan	None awarded	None awarded
