= Samson Co =

Filipino wushu practitioner

Sport
- Sport: Wushu
- Event(s): Changquan, Jianshu, Qiangshu
Medal record
Men's Wushu Taolu
Representing Philippines
World Championships
Gold medal – first place	1991 Beijing	Qiangshu
Gold medal – first place	1993 Kuala Lumpur	Qiangshu
Silver medal – second place	1993 Kuala Lumpur	Jianshu
Bronze medal – third place	1991 Beijing	Jianshu
SEA Games
Gold medal – first place	1991 Manila	Jianshu
Gold medal – first place	1991 Manila	Qiangshu
Gold medal – first place	1993 Singapore	Qiangshu
Bronze medal – third place	1993 Singapore	Jianshu

Samson Co is a retired competitive wushu taolu athlete from the Philippines, and a current coach for the Philippines wushu team.

== Career ==
Co made his international debut at the 1991 World Wushu Championships where he became the world champion in qiangshu and won a bronze medal in jianshu. A few months later, he won two gold medals in jianshu and qiangshu at the 1991 SEA Games. Two years later, Co competed in the 1993 SEA Games and won a gold medal in qiangshu and bronze medal in jianshu. A few months later, he competed in the 1993 World Wushu Championships and once again became the world champion in qiangshu and also won a silver medal in jianshu. He subsequently retired from competitive wushu.

After retiring from competitive wushu, he became a coach, eventually becoming the Philippines Wushu Team national coach, and became a board member for the Wushu Federation of the Philippines. His students have achieved gold medals at the World Wushu Championships, silver medals at the Asian Games, gold medals at the SEA Games, and gold medals at the World Junior Wushu Championships. Co has coached Arvin Ting, Daniel Parantac, and Sandrex Gainsan among others.
