= Heroes in Black =

2001 Singaporean TV series

- Poster
- 我来也
- Genre: Wuxia
- Directed by: Edmund Tse
- Starring: Bobby Au-yeung; Li Nanxing; Fann Wong
- Theme music composer: Lin Yi-hsin
- Opening theme: "I Come Quickly and Leave Quickly Too" (我来也匆匆去也匆匆) by Fann Wong
- Country of origin: Singapore
- Original language: Mandarin
- No. of episodes: 20

Production
- Producers: Edmund Tse; Ma Jiajun
- Production location: Singapore
- Running time: ≈45 minutes per episode
- Production company: Mediacorp

Original release
- Network: Mediacorp Channel 8

Heroes in Black (我来也) is a Singaporean wuxia television series loosely inspired by a Chinese short story in Funny History (谐史) by the Song dynasty writer Shen Shu (沈淑). The story is about a thief known as "Wolaiye" (我来也; "Here I Come") who stole from many wealthy households in the capital during the Song dynasty. In this series, "Wolaiye" is the alter ego of a constable who teams up a magistrate to fight injustice in the county. Both of them also become love rivals because they both fall in love with a lady boss of a restaurant. The series was produced by Mediacorp and starred Bobby Au-yeung, Li Nanxing, and Fann Wong in the lead roles. It was first aired on Mediacorp Channel 8 in Singapore in 2001.

== Synopsis ==
"Wolaiye" (literally "Here I Come") is a masked thief who steals from the rich to help the poor in Zhencheng. "Wolaiye" is actually the alter ego of Song Dou, a constable working in the local county office.

Feng Pobu, an official known for his unyielding nature, is demoted and sent out of the capital to serve as a lowly adviser to the magistrate of Zhencheng. After exposing the magistrate's corrupt behaviour, he becomes the new magistrate and continues to work with Song to bring peace to Zhencheng's citizens.

Song and Feng develop a love rivalry when they both fall in love with Liu Feiyan, the lady boss of a restaurant. Feng is attracted to Liu's personality and wants to marry her, but she already has feelings for Wolaiye. Song also likes Liu, but is reluctant to let her know that he is Wolaiye.

Meanwhile, the Chancellor, who knows that the Emperor is planning to abdicate the throne to his brother Prince Kang, plots to make them destroy each other so that he can become the next emperor. Upon learning that Song's foster son Doudou is the Emperor's son because the Emperor had a secret affair with a commoner, the Chancellor sends his henchmen to kill Doudou. Song, Feng and Liu save Doudou and foil the Chancellor's plot; Prince Kang becomes the new emperor. The series ends with Liu undecided on whether to marry Song or Feng, while the two men debate on who will bring happiness to her.

== Cast ==
- Bobby Au-yeung as Feng Pobu
- Li Nanxing as Wolaiye / Song Dou
- Fann Wong as Liu Feiyan
- Zheng Peipei as Feng Pobu's mother
- Deng Maohui as Doudou
- Apple Hong as Liu Feiyu
- Vincent Ng as Fan Yuan
- Yan Bingliang as the Chancellor
- Liang Tian as the Emperor
- Li Wenhai as Prince Kang
- Richard Low as Lu Da
- Ye Shipin as Lu Er
- Zhou Quanxi as the Magistrate
