= The Iron Heart (TV series) =

2022–23 Philippine television action drama series

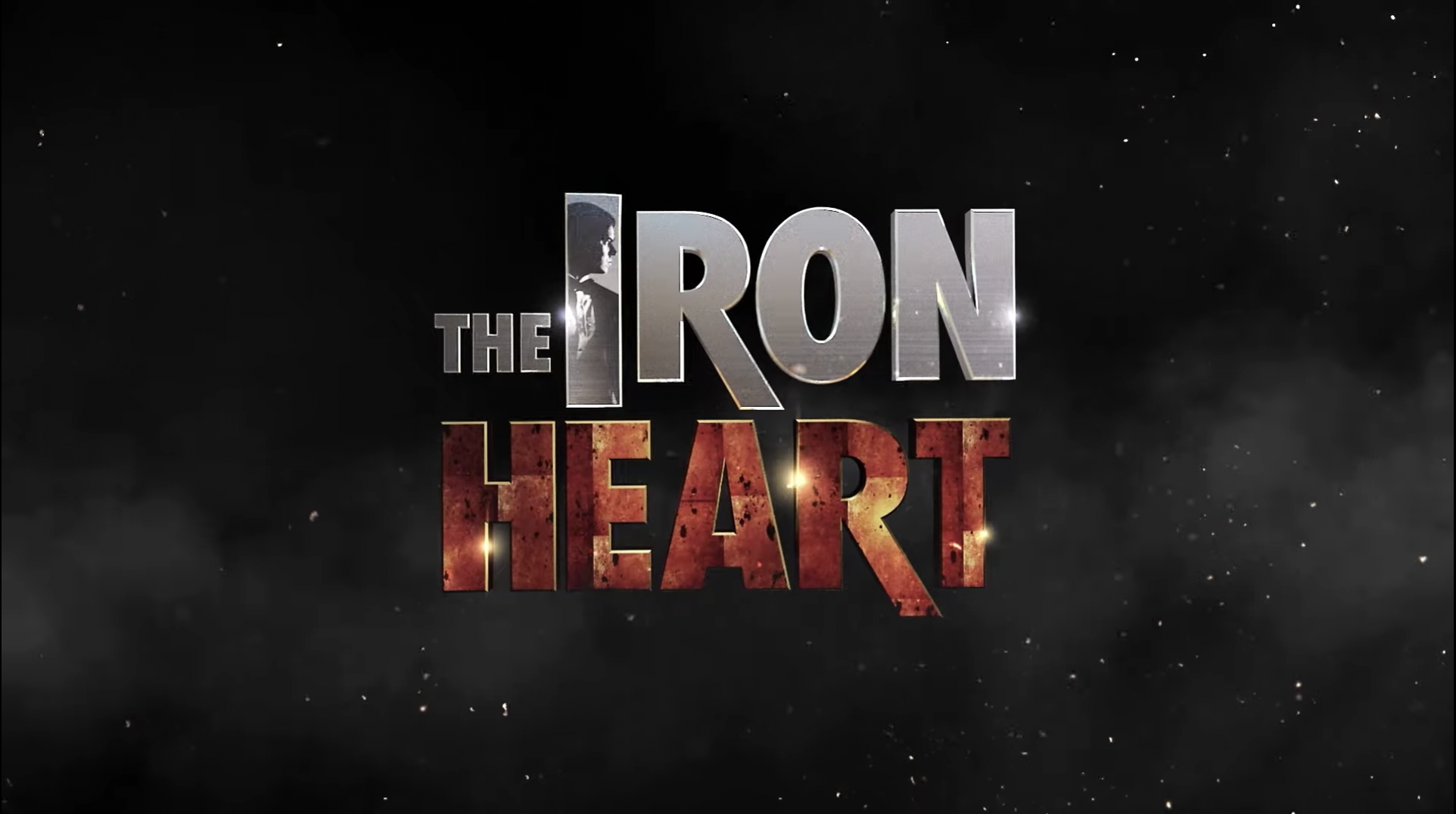
- Title card
- Genre: Action; Drama
- Written by: Generiza Reyes-Francisco; Maan Dimaculangan-Fampulme; Mary Pearl Urtola
- Directed by: Richard Ibasco Arellano (season 1); Lester Pimentel Ong; Wang Yan Bin; Ian Loreños (season 2)
- Starring: Richard Gutierrez
- Music by: Francis Concio
- Opening theme: "Sino Ka Ba?" by Khimo Gumatay (season 1); "Sino Ka Ba?" by Pablo and Josh of SB19; (season 2)
- Composers: Jonathan Manalo; Rox Santos; Jeremy G
- Country of origin: Philippines
- Original language: Filipino
- No. of seasons: 2
- No. of episodes: 238 (list of episodes)

Production
- Executive producers: Carlo Katigbak; Cory Vidanes; Laurenti Dyogi; Des de Guzman
- Producers: Henry King Quitain; Jay Fernando; Sackey Prince Pendatun; Kristine P. Sioson; Pamela M. Quizon
- Production locations: Cebu City; Carcar, Cebu; Dalaguete, Cebu; Italy (season 2); Iloilo City (season 2); Anilao, Iloilo (season 2); Badiangan, Iloilo (season 2); Tokyo, Japan (season 2 final episode)
- Cinematography: Marcial "McCoy" Tarnate III; Anthony Bernard "AB" Garcia
- Editor: Kathryn Jerry Perez
- Running time: 16-33 minutes
- Production company: Star Creatives

Original release
- Network: Kapamilya Channel (Note: The series also aired on A2Z, Jeepney TV, Kapamilya Online Live, TV5 and worldwide via The Filipino Channel. It was also available on-demand via iWantTFC.)
- Release: November 14, 2022 – October 13, 2023

The Iron Heart is a Philippine action drama series aired by Kapamilya Channel. Directed by Richard Ibasco Arellano, Lester Pimentel Ong, Wang Yan Bin, and Ian Loreños, it stars Richard Gutierrez in the title role. It aired on the network's Primetime Bida line up and worldwide on TFC from November 14, 2022 to October 13, 2023.

== Plot ==
Apollo Adelantar is an elite undercover operative tasked with dismantling Altare, a powerful criminal syndicate involved in terrorism, illegal trafficking, corruption, and other transnational crimes. During his mission, Apollo discovers that the organization is connected to influential individuals whose actions have shaped his own past.

As he penetrates deeper into Altare's operations, Apollo faces betrayal from people he once trusted while forming alliances with fellow agents and civilians determined to stop the syndicate. His investigation gradually uncovers hidden truths surrounding his identity, family history, and the circumstances that transformed him into one of the country's most skilled operatives.

The conflict expands beyond the Philippines as Apollo pursues Altare's network across multiple locations and confronts increasingly dangerous enemies. Throughout the series, he must balance his duty as an agent with his personal quest for justice while protecting those closest to him.

In the later stages of the story, new adversaries emerge and long-hidden conspiracies are revealed. Apollo and his allies engage in a final struggle against Altare's leadership, leading to a series of confrontations that determine the fate of the organization and the people affected by its crimes.

== Cast and characters ==
=== Final ===
Main cast

- Richard Gutierrez as Apollo "Pol" Adelantar / Olimpio "Tisoy" Custodio / Aries dela Torre
  - Kyle Echarri as young Apollo
- Albert Martinez as Engr. Priam dela Torre
- Jake Cuenca as Eros "Commando" del Rio
  - Renshi de Guzman as young Eros
- Dimples Romana as Selene Larisa
- Sue Ramirez as Venus Z. Magbanua
  - Hannah Lopez Vito as young Venus
- Sofia Andres as Nyx Bonifacio
- Carmen Soo as Harmonia Sin
- Ian Veneracion as Menandro Sin
- Christian Vasquez as Orcus Silverio
- Roi Vinzon as Hector Adelantar
- Louise Abuel as Troy Adelantar
- Anthony Jennings as Cronus Lopez
- Althea Ruedas as Malia "Lia" Jusay
- Pepe Herrera as Poseidon Abusado
- Diether Ocampo as Echo Madrigal
- Maricel Laxa as Atty. Helen Gomez
- Meryll Soriano as Juno Suarez-Nuevo
- Baron Geisler as Janus Salazar
- Ryan Eigenmann as Adonis Salvador
- Benjie Paras as Aphroditus "Aphro" Viray
- JM de Guzman as Br. Joseph Cruz

Supporting cast

- Ryza Cenon as Circe Miranda
- Cris Villanueva as Theo de Legazpi
- Richard Quan as Atlas
- Alex Medina as Koa Belarmino
- Igi Boy Flores as Hercules "Kules" Nemesio
- Anna Luna as Hera Cruz
- Krystal Brimner as Iris Guevarra
- Fabio Ide as Darren
- Ruben Maria Soriquez as Marcus
- Manuel Chua as Romulo Gimenez
- Thou Reyes as Orion
- Gian Magdangal as Cian
- Lance Pimentel as Dylan Reyes
- Miko Raval as Draco
- Anna Marin as Delia Adelantar
- Enzo Pineda as Hero Sequestro
- Mitoy Yonting as Dionysus "Bungo" Magbanua
- Andi Abaya as Maia
- Rafa Siguion-Reyna as Xenon Alejandro
- Ruby Ruiz as Cora

Recurring cast

- Marc Abaya as Gaspar Kintanar
- Tom Olivar as Terro Silverio
- Archie Adamos as Sen. Midas Rivero
- Mark McMahon as Henry Rosales
- DJ Jhai Ho as Mama D
- Brian Sy as Roman Zabale
- Lou Yanong as Rhea
- Efren Reyes Jr. as Clark
- Ian Ignacio as Aion
- Cay Kujipers as Clio
- Rob Sy as Shin
- Laziz Rustamov
- Raffy Yllana as Icarus Xibalba
- Joem Bascon as Hermes Nuevo
- Jeric Raval as John Mariano
- Ramon Christopher as Damon Bellona
- Emmanuelle Vera as Athena Omorfia
- Turs Daza as Nawat
- Vivoree Esclito as Penelope Sta. Maria
- JC Alcantara as Eric Trinidad
- Ronnie Lazaro as Oak
- Heaven Peralejo as Daphne
- Christine Samson as Freja
- Jun Nayra as Director Rosario
- Victor Silayan as Matthew
- Carla Guevarra as Cassandra and Lia's mother
- Ana Abad Santos as Verna Zamora
- Maika Rivera as Lea Villanueva
- Elvis Gutierrez as Zandro Magsino
- Bart Guingona as Nandy del Rio
- Sue Prado as Diana Alejandro
- Jaycee Parker as Minerva Zamora-Magbanua
- Mark Oblea as Sol Austria
- Lance Carr as Jason dela Torre
- Matt Evans as Owen
- Bodjie Pascua as Manny Abusado
- Moi Bien as Hestia Abusado
- Jay Gonzaga as Nico
- Jong Cuenco as Villamor
- Zeus Collins as Aldous
- Lui Villaruz as Police Capt. Vergel Nierbes
- CJ Salonga as Lex
- River Joseph as Carl
- Beatriz Teves as Bea
- Michelle Vito as Kali
- Miles Ocampo as Karen
- Elijah Canlas as Conrado Reyes

Guest cast

- Maja Salvador as Cassandra Jusay
  - Karina Bautista as young Cassandra
- Al Tantay as Homer Adelantar
- Sarah Lahbati as the new secret agent

== Production ==
The Iron Heart was produced by Star Creatives as one of ABS-CBN's flagship action-drama programs. The series marked Richard Gutierrez's return to a leading action role and featured extensive stunt work, fight choreography, and location shooting. Production personnel emphasized a cinematic approach to action sequences and storytelling.

=== Filming ===
Filming took place in various locations throughout the Philippines, including Cebu City, Carcar, Dalaguete, Iloilo City, Anilao, and Badiangan. Additional sequences for the second season were filmed in Italy, while the series finale included scenes set in Tokyo, Japan. The production utilized both local and international locations to support the show's espionage-oriented narrative and large-scale action sequences.

=== Broadcast ===
The series premiered on Kapamilya Channel on November 14, 2022, and was simultaneously made available through A2Z, TV5, Jeepney TV, Kapamilya Online Live, and The Filipino Channel. Episodes were also released for streaming through iWantTFC, allowing audiences worldwide to watch the series on demand.

=== Pre-release ===
The official trailer accumulated more than 2.6 million views across all leading social media platforms in its first 24 hours.

=== Online viewership ===
On September 11, 2023, the series drew an all-time high of 451,538 live concurrent viewers on YouTube.

=== Ratings ===
According to Nielsen NUTAM People Survey, the series attained its highest television rating on September 28, 2023, with an average of 9.4%, beating its timeslot competitor Love Before Sunrise which only managed to score 7.7%.
