= List of The Iron Heart episodes =

The Iron Heart is a Philippine action drama television series broadcast by Kapamilya Channel. The series aired on the network's Primetime Bida evening block, Jeepney TV, A2Z Primetime, and TV5's TodoMax Primetime Singko, and worldwide via The Filipino Channel and Kapatid Channel from November 14, 2022 to October 13, 2023, replacing 2 Good 2 Be True.

== Series overview ==
Season	Episodes	Originally released	
Season	Episodes	First released	Last released
1	163	November 14, 2022	June 30, 2023
2	75	July 3, 2023	October 13, 2023

== Episodes ==
=== Season 1 (2022–23) ===
No. overall	No. in season	Title	TV title	Original release date	AGB Nielsen Ratings NUTAM People
1	1	"Core of Iron"	"The Origin"	November 14, 2022	4.8%
Taking his father's words to heart, Apollo uses his unexplainable strength for good. One day, their simple life takes a dark turn following a violent encounter with drug addicts. Apollo later receives an enticing offer from a total stranger.
2	2	"The Calling"	"Bugbog"	November 15, 2022	5.2%
Apollo gets forced to choose between love and duty as he receives his first mission as a top secret agent. Amid his preparations, his strength and principles are put to the test when a group of unknown men abducts him.
3	3	"Hit the Mission Road"	"Lakas at Plano"	November 16, 2022	4.9%
As part of his mission to bring down Tatsulok, Apollo throws his promising life away and enters jail to penetrate the notorious drug syndicate. Following her painful reunion with Apollo, Cassandra receives unexpected houseguests.
4	4	"The Breakout"	"Escape"	November 17, 2022	5.8%
5	5	"Up the Ladder"	"Venus"	November 18, 2022	6.0%
6	6	"Inked"	"Markado"	November 21, 2022	5.1%
7	7	"Rising Leader"	"Lider"	November 22, 2022	5.4%
8	8	"Period of Peace"	"One More Chance"	November 23, 2022	5.1%
9	9	"Payback"	"Ganti ng Ama"	November 24, 2022	5.9%
10	10	"Cassandra's End"	"Cassandra"	November 25, 2022	6.1%
11	11	"Assembly of the Wicked"	"Bossing"	November 28, 2022	5.0%
12	12	"The Manhunt"	"Disguise"	November 29, 2022	5.3%
13	13	"A New Task"	"Walang Gigiba"	November 30, 2022	5.3%
14	14	"First Skirmish"	"Raket"	December 1, 2022	5.8%
15	15	"In His Arms"	"Bagong Puso"	December 2, 2022	5.6%
16	16	"New Pair of Eyes"	"The Silenced"	December 5, 2022	5.1%
17	17	"Roles to Undertake"	"Anger Monster"	December 6, 2022	4.9%
18	18	"Delos"	"Lab Cage"	December 7, 2022	5.8%
19	19	"The Bug"	"Bagong Peste"	December 8, 2022	5.0%
20	20	"Uncovering Evidence"	"Save Them"	December 9, 2022	5.5%
21	21	"Plan of Action"	"The Greater Good"	December 12, 2022	5.2%
22	22	"Day of Trade Offs"	"Sagip"	December 13, 2022	5.4%
23	23	"One Wins, Some Fail"	"Lab on Fire"	December 14, 2022	6.0%
24	24	"Realizations"	"The Deal"	December 15, 2022	6.0%
25	25	"Dose of Your Own Medicine"	"Acid Killer"	December 16, 2022	5.5%
26	26	"Covert Identity"	"Secret Boss"	December 19, 2022	5.0%
27	27	"Caught Up"	"Death Strike"	December 20, 2022	4.8%
28	28	"Interrogation"	"Self Defense"	December 21, 2022	5.5%
29	29	"Promises"	"The Pawn"	December 22, 2022	5.0%
30	30	"The Other Agent"	"Back to Barracks"	December 23, 2022	4.4%
31	31	"The Engineer's Second Son"	"The Experiment"	December 26, 2022	4.9%
32	32	"Of Warnings and Red Flags"	"Abort"	December 27, 2022	4.9%
33	33	"Connected After All"	"Secret Plans"	December 28, 2022	6.1%
34	34	"Business Continuity"	"Scammer"	December 29, 2022	N/A
35	35	"A Time to Phish"	"Mekaniko"	December 30, 2022	4.7%
36	36	"The Magic Drip"	"Imbestigador"	January 2, 2023	5.4%
37	37	"What Comes After"	"Evacuation"	January 3, 2023	6.3%
38	38	"Need to Know More"	"Pretender"	January 4, 2023	4.9%
39	39	"The Snitch"	"Flash Report"	January 5, 2023	4.8%
40	40	"Apollo"	"Family Matters"	January 6, 2023	5.1%
41	41	"Hurt Not My Family"	"Higanti at Paghati"	January 9, 2023	4.8%
42	42	"Sudden Sincerity"	"The Patient"	January 10, 2023	5.0%
43	43	"No More Guesswork"	"Confession of Venus"	January 11, 2023	5.3%
44	44	"Taking Measures"	"Eaves Drop"	January 12, 2023	5.1%
45	45	"As Feelings Linger"	"Flashback"	January 13, 2023	5.0%
46	46	"Calm Before"	"Kanang Kamay"	January 16, 2023	5.0%
47	47	"Getting There"	"Kubli"	January 17, 2023	5.1%
48	48	"Athernity Night"	"Snitch"	January 18, 2023	5.2%
49	49	"More Heat Than Light"	"Cold Storage"	January 19, 2023	5.2%
50	50	"Teaming Up"	"Hide and Seek"	January 20, 2023	5.5%
51	51	"Out of the Bag"	"Ang Salarin"	January 23, 2023	5.2%
52	52	"Safekeeping"	"Loyalty Test"	January 24, 2023	5.8%
53	53	"Didn't See That Coming"	"Athena's Legacy"	January 25, 2023	5.2%
54	54	"Mad Man's Wrath"	"Lipat Bahay"	January 26, 2023	5.1%
55	55	"Agent vs. Agent"	"Rambol"	January 27, 2023	6.1%
56	56	"Of Warnings & Cautions"	"Mad Engineer"	January 30, 2023	5.2%
57	57	"Battle of Nerves"	"Troll Farm"	January 31, 2023	5.6%
58	58	"Inceptive Blast"	"Bagong Utos"	February 1, 2023	5.4%
59	59	"Two Agents Save"	"Bomba"	February 2, 2023	5.4%
60	60	"Madness"	"The Bomber"	February 3, 2023	6.4%
61	61	"The Moment of Encounter"	"Mystery Hero"	February 6, 2023	5.8%
62	62	"The New Boss"	"Secret Boss Reveal"	February 7, 2023	5.8%
63	63	"On One's Ground"	"Bad Blood"	February 8, 2023	5.7%
64	64	"Out with the Dead, In with the New"	"Funeral"	February 9, 2023	5.7%
65	65	"Latest Ace"	"Bagong Salta"	February 10, 2023	5.1%
66	66	"Torture"	"The Challenge"	February 13, 2023	6.1%
67	67	"Break-In"	"Code Red"	February 14, 2023	6.3%
68	68	"Brewing"	"Kalokohan"	February 15, 2023	7.1%
69	69	"Schemes"	"Sparring"	February 16, 2023	6.9%
70	70	"Plan and Rescue"	"Escape Plan"	February 17, 2023	6.7%
71	71	"All Hands"	"Tutok"	February 20, 2023	6.5%
72	72	"All Ears"	"Fight or Flight"	February 21, 2023	6.4%
73	73	"Saving One Man's Life"	"Jail Break"	February 22, 2023	8.0%
74	74	"For a Taste of Freedom"	"Reunited"	February 23, 2023	7.0%
75	75	"New Beginning"	"As A Father"	February 24, 2023	7.1%
76	76	"A Daughter's Pain"	"Basag na Bungo"	February 27, 2023	7.7%
77	77	"A Moment of Grief"	"Resbak Niveus"	February 28, 2023	6.4%
78	78	"Retribution"	"Gigil na Gigil"	March 1, 2023	7.5%
79	79	"Change of Plans"	"Siklab"	March 2, 2023	7.4%
80	80	"Father and son Dispute"	"Walang Kawalan"	March 3, 2023	7.0%
81	81	"Enter the Nercissus"	"Rigodon"	March 6, 2023	6.9%
82	82	"Side Job"	"Magic Vape"	March 7, 2023	8.0%
83	83	"Listening In"	"Kontrando"	March 8, 2023	6.9%
84	84	"Sudden Changes"	"Nginig"	March 9, 2023	7.5%
85	85	"Danger Ahead"	"Marites"	March 10, 2023	6.5%
86	86	"When Tings Go Noth"	"Aberya"	March 13, 2023	7.1%
87	87	"Too Much to Handle"	"Rilot"	March 14, 2023	N/A
88	88	"Catching Echo"	"Timbog"	March 15, 2023	7.3%
89	89	"Pat of the Pan"	"Suplong"	March 16, 2023	7.4%
90	90	"Attermath"	"Lantaran"	March 17, 2023	7.3%
91	91	"What Really"	"The Manager"	March 20, 2023	6.8%
92	92	"What Surprised Them"	"Wipe Out"	March 21, 2023	7.8%
93	93	"Where Everybody is on the Move"	"Enigman"	March 22, 2023	7.0%
94	94	"Who Finds What"	"Tinugis"	March 23, 2023	7.2%
95	95	"When Someone Knows"	"Lab Rat"	March 24, 2023	7.3%
96	96	"Hyperion Virus"	"Infection"	March 27, 2023	7.7%
97	97	"Bringing the Pieces Together"	"Traydor"	March 28, 2023	6.9%
98	98	"About to Sink"	"Closer"	March 29, 2023	7.5%
99	99	"Venus 2.0"	"Strategy"	March 30, 2023	7.4%
100	100	"The Boat is Sinking"	"Laban ni Venus"	March 31, 2023	8.3%
101	101	"Attempt Thwarted"	"Operation: Saklolo"	April 3, 2023	8.6%
102	102	"Committed to the Job"	"Stronger Together"	April 4, 2023	7.5%
103	103	"Putting the Hero Down"	"Palermo Island"	April 5, 2023	7.2%
104	104	"A Father's Story"	"Lost Son"	April 10, 2023	6.9%
105	105	"What's Left Behind"	"Missing Pieces"	April 11, 2023	6.9%
106	106	"Retaliation"	"Brawl"	April 12, 2023	8.0%
107	107	"Justice Served"	"Payback Time"	April 13, 2023	7.5%
108	108	"Connecting the Dots"	"Find the Snitch"	April 14, 2023	N/A
109	109	"The Janus that Got away"	"Janus Got Away"	April 17, 2023	N/A
110	110	"Finders and Seekers"	"The Shadow"	April 18, 2023	N/A
111	111	"Behind the Charity Gala"	"Bight Night"	April 19, 2023	N/A
112	112	"Expected Vacancy"	"Sino ang Tiktik?"	April 20, 2023	N/A
113	113	"Taking the Bait"	"Unmasked"	April 21, 2023	N/A
114	114	"Out of the Bag"	"Apollo Revealed"	April 24, 2023	N/A
115	115	"The Chase Begins"	"Caught in Between"	April 25, 2023	N/A
116	116	"Rampage"	"On the Run"	April 26, 2023	N/A
117	117	"Mission Is Over"	"Downfall"	April 27, 2023	N/A
118	118	"Grief"	"Mourning"	April 28, 2023	N/A
119	119	"Gone Rogue"	"Wanted Agent"	May 1, 2023	N/A
Apollois more eager than ever to continue his mission to end Tatsulok amidst the challenges he will face now that Priam knows his real identity in "The Iron Heart." But things will be difficult for him as Helen informed him that he is out of the mission. Despite Helen's orders, Apollo stands firm in his resolve to exact revenge on Priam and Tatsulok no matter what it takes.
120	120	"Tipped Off"	"Bagong Yugto"	May 2, 2023	N/A
Priam considers setting a trap in a bid to catch Apollo. Venus and Poseidon find themselves in danger as some Tatsulok members prove to be adamant in tracking them and Tisoy down.
121	121	"The Next Phase"	"Most Wanted"	May 3, 2023	N/A
Juno arrives just in time to help Apollo, Venus, and Poseidon escape from Orcus' group and later leads her allies into Hermes' secret den. With Apollo's mission compromised, Helen is left with no choice but to order his capture.
122	122	"Done Brewing the Plot"	"Ang Paniningil"	May 4, 2023	N/A
Despite losing the government's support, Apollo resolves to face Priam head on. Eros urges Nyx to stop tracking down Venus, but to no avail. The convoy transferring Echo to another detention facility gets ambushed.
123	123	"Bad New Comes in Two's"	"Bitag"	May 5, 2023	6.2%
Cronus finds a safe way to get in touch with Venus and Apollo. Determined to capture Tisoy once and for all, Priam and the rest of Tatsulok lay out a trap that is sure to alarm the elusive snitch.
124	124	"An Honoble Demise"	"Retribution"	May 8, 2023	6.0%
Priam's wickedness reaches extreme heights as he sends a devastating message to enrage Tisoy. Fueled by anger and his determination to bring down Tatsulok, Apollo resolves to finally face Engineer.
125	125	"Bloodshed"	"This is War"	May 9, 2023	7.2%
Gunfight ensues as Apollo faces Priam and the rest of Tatsulok who are all eager to take down the snitch with their own hands. Venus, Juno, and Poseidon arrive to help their ally fight Engineer's trusted soldiers.
126	126	"Retreat"	"Bangon"	May 10, 2023	7.1%
The authorities arrive just as Apollo reveals to Priam that he knows about the Iron Heart project. Later, an unexpected ally comes to Juno, Poseidon, and a wounded Venus' rescue.
127	127	"What is to Come"	"Bagong Pinuno"	May 11, 2023	7.1%
Priam orders his top followers to find more test subjects for the Iron Heart project and prevent Tisoy from getting near it. After filling the void left by Helen at the CIB, Menandro issues a stern warning against Engineer.
128	128	"Meeting the New Deputy"	"Bagong Pwersa"	May 12, 2023	7.0%
Priam's desire to capture Apollo gets stronger as he sets his sights on finding out the whole truth about the Iron Heart project. Apollo, on the other hand, finally recovers and comes face-to-face with Menandro.
129	129	"Apollo 5"	"Apollo 5"	May 15, 2023	6.1%
Apollo, Venus, Poseidon, Juno, and Eros officially form the group Apollo 5 at the headquarters. While Selene gives Eros the task to gather human test subjects, Apollo wastes no time in devising a plan to stop Priam's Iron Heart project.
130	130	"Failed Mission"	"Tambangan"	May 16, 2023	N/A
Selene and Orcus' attempt to fish for more information from Aphro about the Iron Heart project remains fruitless. Believing that the coast is clear, Apollo's team sets out to abduct Aphro, unaware that Echo (Diether Ocampo) got wind of their plan.
131	131	"When Information is the king"	"Target"	May 17, 2023	N/A
Apollo urges Eros to use Nyx to get more information about Priam and the Iron Heart project, leaving the other Tatsulok mole conflicted. Troy and Cronus find a way to help Apollo's team clear their names.
132	132	"Acquired Intel"	"Saliksik"	May 18, 2023	N/A
Eros begins breaking down Nyx's wall in a bid to acquire intel on Priam's schemes. Selene sets her sights on Cali after failing to get information about the Iron Heart project from Aphro.
133	133	"Track Down"	"Hulihan"	May 19, 2023	N/A
Despite successfully luring Nyx into spending time with him, Eros struggles to obtain any information about Priam and his project. Apollo and his team race against time as an oblivious Cronus gets tracked down by Echo's men.
134	134	"Cutting the Chase"	"Habulan"	May 22, 2023	7.3%
Apollo orders his team to retreat when Echo arrives with the intent of finishing him off once and for all. Desperate for information, Selene resorts to intimidation as she coerces Kali to divulge everything about Priam's Iron Heart project.
135	135	"Closing In"	"Nagbabadya"	May 23, 2023	8.0%
Apollo's team heads back to their headquarters after rescuing Cronus, unaware that Adonis is following their trail after putting a tracker on Juno's car. Later, Apollo is left frustrated after a meeting with Menandro about their next move.
136	136	"Hyperion Vaccine"	"Agenda"	May 24, 2023	6.5%
While Priam boasts about the Hyperion vaccine's efficacy to the Tish representative, Apollo's team gears up for their mission to infiltrate the Iron Heart project laboratory. Eros continues his efforts to gain Nyx's trust.
137	137	"Access Denied"	"Alarma"	May 25, 2023	6.9%
As part of his mission to get information about the Iron Heart project, Eros puts a bugging device on Nyx's bag. Things are going smoothly until Priam's aide heads to his lab and sets off the alarm, inevitably putting the Apollo 5's mission in peril.
138	138	"Disclosure"	"Panganib"	May 26, 2023	7.2%
Nyx attempts to convince Priam of her innocence and loyalty without exposing Eros' true color. The Apollo 5 finds out the truth about the Iron Heart project, oblivious to the danger lurking around them.
139	139	"Target Point"	"Target Locked"	May 29, 2023	7.7%
Adonis finally finds the Apollo 5's headquarters. Apollo strikes a deal with Kali to know Tatsulok's next moves. A violent and emotional confrontation ensues between Eros and Nyx.
140	140	"Another Cover Blown"	"Pasabog"	May 30, 2023	8.1%
Eros fights for his life against Romulo's men after getting exposed as the other snitch. Apollo's team steps right into Adonis' explosive trap. Priam orders Aphro to get rid of Kali.
141	141	"Sustained Injuries"	"Ligtas"	May 31, 2023	7.0%
Apollo and his team manage to get out of their headquarters alive, but Adonis remains determined in finishing them off. Nyx goes back to Priam, ready to receive her punishment. Aphro struggles to obey Engineer's command.
142	142	"Heightened Emotions"	"Walang Susuko"	June 1, 2023	7.1%
Despite learning of Apollo's growing doubts about the CIB director, Eros tries to persuade Menandro to keep the former agent a part of their mission. Priam rejoices as he inches closer to reaching his goal of world domination.
143	143	"Pushing Through"	"The Mission"	June 2, 2023	7.3%
Despite learning of Apollo's growing doubts about the CIB director, Eros tries to persuade Menandro to keep the former agent a part of their mission. Priam rejoices as he inches closer to reaching his goal of world domination.
144	144	"Aphro's Destruction"	"Saklolo"	June 5, 2023	7.5%
Driven by her conscience and worry over her sister, Kali discloses Tatsulok's next moves to Apollo. The Apollo 5 then races against time to stop Priam's wicked plot to spread the hyperion virus all over the world.
145	145	"An Angry Outburst"	"Tibay ng Loob"	June 6, 2023	7.4%
Apollo's team rushes to rescue Kali and the people trapped inside the Tatsulok lab. However, their mission proves to be challenging as Priam moves to destroy every piece of evidence of his evil project.
146	146	"Thwarting an Evil Plan"	"Trace and Race"	June 7, 2023	7.1%
Eros confronts Menandro for leaving the Apollo 5 helpless against Priam's schemes. Later, Kali and Apollo's team try to stop the virus from spreading by contacting Karen, unaware that Engineer and his soldiers are tracking the subject's movements.
147	147	"Sitio Tartaros"	"Bakbakan"	June 8, 2023	7.7%
While Selene's and Orcus' groups track down Karen, the Apollo 5 wastes no time in getting to Conrad. Later, a gunfight ensues when Apollo's team encounters Tatsulok.
148	148	"Infected"	"Pagkalat"	June 9, 2023	7.5%
Apollo and Eros find themselves fighting against familiar faces upon coming across their former colleagues in Tatsulok. Kali finally manages to communicate with Karen, but unfortunate news gets in the way of their reunion.
149	149	"Unwavering Resolve"	"Protector"	June 12, 2023	7.3%
Apollo resolves to honor his vow to protect the lives of innocent people as he rejects Eros' rational yet heartless suggestion to stop the spread of the Hyperion virus. Priam tells Nyx why he is not letting Selene handle the Iron Heart project.
150	150	"Rance Against Escape"	"Pagtakas"	June 13, 2023	7.1%
With the help of Penelope's team, Kali continues her attempts to recreate the Hyperion virus vaccine. Bent on getting to Argovia, Conrad disregards the Apollo 5's warnings and tries to escape.
151	151	"Viral Tensions"	"Exposed"	June 14, 2023	6.6%
Apollo's life is put at risk after trying to stop Conrad from leaving the country. Priam soon learns of the incident and orders his men to keep a close eye on the infected subjects.
152	152	"Batting Infections"	"Isolate"	June 15, 2023	7.3%
Apollo's team and the scientists working on the vaccine receive much-needed assistance from the government. Apollo still shows no symptoms of the Hyperion virus despite Conrad and Karen's worsening state, leaving Kali baffled.
153	153	"Love, Loss Looming"	"Love in War"	June 16, 2023	6.7%
Venus' overwhelming concern for Apollo forces her to confess her feelings, oblivious to an enemy's prying eyes in the shadows. Things take a turn for the worse as the virus takes a toll on Conrad.
154	154	"Aires dela Torre"	"Baby 007"	June 19, 2023	6.9%
Eros, Venus, and Poseidon begin connecting the dots upon learning that Apollo tested negative for the Hyperion virus. Hector pays his nephew a visit, leaving an envelope containing shocking information about the fate of a baby named Aries dela Torre.
155	155	"Saving Verus"	"Saving Venus"	June 20, 2023	7.0%
Despite the recent revelations, Apollo delights in Kali's discovery that his blood could be the answer to their problems. Later, however, an enemy seeking revenge finds the perfect person to use against Apollo.
156	156	"Revelations and resuces"	"Laban ng Puso"	June 21, 2023	7.3%
Despite the recent revelations, Apollo delights in Kali's discovery that his blood could be the answer to their problems. Later, however, an enemy seeking revenge finds the perfect person to use against Apollo.
157	157	"Prima's Firstborn"	"Italy"	June 22, 2023	7.2%
While Menandro tries to stop the Hyperion virus from spreading outside Hellas, Priam safely arrives in Italy before his trip to Tish. His smooth-sailing journey, however, makes a shocking turn when he receives Diana's last audio log.
158	158	"Father and son Moment"	"Mag-ama"	June 23, 2023	6.8%
Apollo reaches out to Priam as he takes advantage of his blood relationship with him, hoping to put an end to the Hyperion virus crisis. Menandro senses something amiss upon learning that Apollo has flown to Italy.
159	159	"Conflict and Contagio"	"Tensyon"	June 26, 2023	8.0%
Setting foot in Italy, Apollo begins to doubt Priam's intentions when two suspicious men attempt to seize him. Another soul succumbs to the Hyperion virus as the Philippine government ramps up its efforts to contain the contagion.
160	160	"Deception and Pursuit"	"Sanib Pwersa"	June 27, 2023	7.7%
While Apollo falls victim to deceitful Italian goons, Eros and Menandro arrive in Italy to join the search for Engineer and his son. A misunderstanding between Nyx and Romulo leads to a violent confrontation. Selene demands the truth from Priam.
161	161	"Crossroads of Destiny"	"Paghaharap"	June 28, 2023	7.2%
Orcus and Selene abduct Venus and Kali. Juno faints while attending to Poseidon. Priam resolves to delay his trip to Tish in a bid to meet up with Apollo, unaware that Eros and Menandro are following his son.
162	162	"Clashing Loyalties"	"Pagtutuos"	June 29, 2023	7.7%
Priam’s reunion with his long-lost son escalates into a gunfight when Apollo rejects his offer to join his side. Panic creeps into Selene’s psyche when Venus tells her that she is already infected with the Hyperion virus.
163	163	"A Son's Strand, A Father's End"	"Apollo vs. Priam"	June 30, 2023	7.3%
While Selene makes her stand, Juno and Poseidon cling to the hope that Apollo will succeed in finding a cure for Hyperion. Apollo's steadfast resolve, however, pushes Priam to do the unthinkable, until Eros intervenes.

=== Season 2 (2023) ===
No. overall	No. in season	Title	TV title	Original release date	AGB Nielsen Ratings NUTAM People
164	1	"Mission Accomplished"	"Mission Accomplished"	July 3, 2023	7.1%
Apollo and Eros finally accomplish their mission to defeat Priam and secure the vaccine. While the CIB celebrates its success, Apollo chooses to live a simple life with his family. Meanwhile, Hector attends a religious gathering.
165	2	"A New Chapter Begins"	"Bagong Yugto"	July 4, 2023	6.6%
Turning a new leaf, Apollo spends quality time with his loved ones and prepares to look for a normal job. Selene vows to bring Tatsulok back to its former glory. A hooded man gets congratulated for bringing down Priam and his organization.
166	3	"Altare"	"Altare"	July 5, 2023	7.0%
While carefully taking a look at the police operation that interrupted his meetup with Troy and Cronus, Apollo notices a strange card lying on the ground, unaware that the item's appearance is a quick prelude to danger for both his allies and foes.
167	4	"Commando"	"Commando"	July 6, 2023	7.1%
Harmonia warns Menandro that Altare, the world's largest transnational crime organization, has arrived in the Philippines. Orcus is subjected to an unconventional torture method. A cautious Juno asks Apollo to meet her privately.
168	5	"Juno's Tragic End"	"Maskara"	July 7, 2023	6.8%
While Apollo grows extremely worried for her, Juno encounters the man who kidnapped Orcus. Despite knowing fully well that it could be a trap, Selene prepares to rescue the abducted Tatsulok member.
169	6	"Lost Evidence and Silent Secrets"	"Ebidensya"	July 10, 2023	7.4%
Apollo notices a group of strange men fleeing the scene moments after Juno's fall. Selene and her underlings step into a trap as they look for Orcus. Eros resolves to investigate his old ally's untimely demise.
170	7	"Defiant Resolve"	"Singsing"	July 11, 2023	6.3%
Apollo and Eros begin to investigate Juno's case. Selene ends up joining Orcus in captivity and soon faces their eccentric captor. Apollo finally meets Brother Joseph, whose accessory immediately catches the former's eye.
171	8	"Fate's Web"	"Delikado"	July 12, 2023	6.1%
Atlas comes up with a brutal way to force Selene, Orcus, and Dylan to join his side. After getting acquainted with Brother Joseph, Apollo grows concerned upon learning that Hector is planning to donate all his properties to Yusebeia.
172	9	"The Face Behind"	"Yusebeia"	July 13, 2023	6.9%
During the CIB's operation against Atlas' group, Xenon is left in disbelief upon being greeted by a familiar face before meeting his end. Apollo receives a warning from one of Yusebeia's devotees following Hector's anointing ceremony.
173	10	"Puzzling Passing and Machinations"	"Traydor"	July 14, 2023	6.6%
Determined to fight Atlas' group for Priam's memory, Selene decides to seek help from a former ally. Brother Joseph takes matters into his own hands as Apollo begins to investigate Yusebeia. Eros gets a new assignment from Menandro.
174	11	"Double Cross"	"Double Cross"	July 17, 2023	6.8%
Upon hearing Menandro's thoughts on Juno's demise, Harmonia resolves to recruit Apollo to be part of her mission to bring down Altare. Selene plans to use Eros against Atlas’ group, unaware of the trap she is about to step into.
175	12	"Tensions Rise"	"Engkwentro"	July 18, 2023	7.5%
Orcus arrives just in time to give Selene an opportunity to escape from Eros and the CIB. Confirming that Apollo is sniffing around Yusebeia, Joseph puts a hit on the former secret agent.
176	13	"Unraveling Suspicions"	"Duda"	July 19, 2023	7.6%
Apollo's suspicions about Yusebeia grows after the failed attempt on his life. Troy struggles to juggle his job and studies as he tries to fill the role Hector left behind. Nyx escapes out of prison.
177	14	"Promise of a Good News"	"Hinala"	July 20, 2023	6.9%
Before heading out to accomplish a secret mission, Nyx promises Selene that she will return with a good news. Apollo learns from Kules that Koa knows a lot of things about Yusebeia.
178	15	"Yusebeia's Secret"	"Imbestiga"	July 21, 2023	7.5%
Apollo and Kules' investigation begins to bear fruit as they stumble upon Cora's remains. Just when he decides against seeking additional security measures for Yusebeia, Joseph receives an unexpected call from the police.
179	16	"Whispers From the Dead"	"Hukay"	July 24, 2023	7.2%
Eros urges Apollo to distance himself and his family from Yusebeia, but to no avail. After punishing Koa for his recklessness, Joseph threatens Hector with expulsion if the former undercover agent continues to meddle with their affairs.
180	17	"Unexpected Allies"	"Kasabwat"	July 25, 2023	7.1%
Suspecting that his parents ended up like Cora, Kules undergoes DNA matching with the bones found in Yusebeia. Nyx meets up with Dylan, unaware that the latter is working with Eros. Koa and his men capture Apollo.
181	18	"Captured and Confronted"	"Harapan"	July 26, 2023	8.1%
Joseph reassures Eros that he has control over the whole situation involving Apollo, until the ex-CIB agent fights back. A scuffle ensues between Nyx and Dylan when the latter makes his intentions known.
182	19	"Tides of Deceit"	"Sagupaan"	July 27, 2023	7.8%
After seeing Joseph’s true color, Apollo fights tooth and nail as he tries to escape from Yusebeia’s private army. Kules fumes with rage upon finding his mother’s scarf among the pieces of evidence found in the mass grave.
183	20	"Captive Secrets"	"Reveal"	July 28, 2023	8.0%
Eros chances upon Nyx. A furious Kules confronts Hera about his parents' deaths, resulting in a bloody altercation between them when the whole truth spills out. Menandro carries out confidential fieldwork.
184	21	"Of Captive and Clue"	"Bintang"	July 31, 2023	7.9%
Priam names his price for revealing the things he knows about Altare. Joseph accuses Apollo of murdering Hera. One of Engineer's puzzles leads Nyx to his lawyer.
185	22	"Conspiracy Unraveled"	"Resbak"	August 1, 2023	8.0%
Koa and his men ambush Apollo, only to be driven off by another group that aims to abduct their target. Orcus gets clobbered by Atlas for refusing to spill Selene's whereabouts. Eros urges Joseph to distance himself from Apollo, but to no avail.
186	23	"The Heir"	"Set Up"	August 2, 2023	7.5%
Apollo gets the shock of his life when he meets Priam once again for an absurd assignment. Unbeknownst to the former CIB agent, Joseph finds a way to settle the score with him as the Yusebeia leader publicly accuses him of killing Hera.
187	24	"Crimson Pursuit"	"Sugod"	August 3, 2023	7.8%
Apollo storms Joseph's mansion as he searches for Lia. Selene fumes as she hears the contents of Engineer's last will and testament. Keeping his end of the bargain, Priam reveals to Menandro the things he knows about Altare.
188	25	"Fugitive"	"Paniningil"	August 4, 2023	7.8%
By orders of Brother Joseph, Koa ambushes Kules. Hector tries to convince the Yusebeia leader of his nephew's innocence. As news of Apollo's involvement in Hera's death reaches him, Menandro orders Eros to arrest their former agent.
189	26	"Dawn of a New Era"	"Tuktok"	August 7, 2023	8.6%
An intense chase ensues when Menandro and Eros try to apprehend Apollo. Troy and Cronus get in trouble as they search for Lia. A new era dawns on Tatsulok as it cleans up its ranks, summons its loyal members, and welcomes its new leader.
190	27	"Ascending to Power"	"Bagong Lider"	August 8, 2023	8.5%
Selene questions Apollo's loyalty and leadership, only to be faced with the threat of being marked as Tatsulok's enemy. Dylan pledges his loyalty to Commando. A group of attractive ladies abducts Kules.
191	28	"Entangled Loyalties"	"Higanti"	August 9, 2023	7.7%
Vowing vengeance for Lia's fate, Apollo mobilizes Tatsulok to take down Yusebeia and even the score with Brother Joseph. Harmonia gets ambushed by a group of unknown men, but help arrives in the nick of time.
192	29	"The Hidden Brew"	"Salakay"	August 10, 2023	8.4%
After uncovering how Brother Joseph keeps his devotees faithful, Apollo and Tatsulok prepare for an all-out attack against Yusebeia. Hector's please fall on deaf ears as he urges the police to investigate what happened to Lia.
193	30	"Thanksgiving Mass"	"Bistado"	August 11, 2023	7.9%
Apollo, Orcus, and Romulo infiltrate Yusebeia in an attempt to abduct Brother Joseph. Eros grows alarmed when an anonymous tip alleging Yusebeia's illegal activities prompts the CIB to launch an investigation.
194	31	"Rings of Fate"	"Dakip"	August 14, 2023	8.5%
Brother Joseph flees from Yusebeia and heads to his safe house where he is keeping his captive. While batting Altare's men, Apollo recalls the day Juno died upon seeing Atlas' ring.
195	32	"Deep Ties"	"Bihag"	August 15, 2023	7.4%
Eros and his subordinates resolve to punish Brother Joseph for violating the Altare code. Lia remains in captivity while her family prepares to relocate. Apollo finds an opportunity to gain information on Atlas' connection with the sect leader.
196	33	"Growing Suspicions"	"Patibong"	August 16, 2023	7.9%
Holding Atlas captive, Apollo and Selene try to squeeze information out of the Altare member. Eros pries into the CIB's investigation on Brother Joseph and Yusebeia, unaware of Menandro's growing suspicions against him.
197	34	"Gradual Unfolding"	"Koneksyon"	August 17, 2023	8.0%
Subjected to torture, Atlas reveals to Apollo that he and Brother Joseph are members of Altare. Troy is shocked to see Iris in his new neighborhood. Lia decides to take care of her captor who is suffering from cold.
198	35	"Hunting"	"Hunting"	August 18, 2023	7.9%
Brother Joseph steps out of his hiding place to buy medicine for Lia, inadvertently revealing his whereabouts to Eros and the CIB. Using Atlas as bait, Apollo executes a plan to find Altare's hideout.
199	36	"Misdirection"	"Betrayal"	August 21, 2023	7.6%
A shootout ensues after Apollo and Tatsulok tracked down Atlas supervising a shipment. Amid the commotion, Eros arrives to arrest Apollo, only to learn that his former ally is now the leader of the syndicate they toppled down in the past.
200	37	"Clash for Supremacy"	"Lantaran"	August 22, 2023	7.7%
Despite the overall success of Tatsulok's mission, Selene fears that Apollo is bringing the syndicate to ruin. Dylan spots Brother Joseph's car. Commando orders his subordinates to let him handle his former comrade.
201	38	"Survivor's Surprise"	"Kutob"	August 23, 2023	7.8%
Brother Joseph breathes a sigh of relief when Lia's health improves. However, danger looms as Dylan arrives and goes after them. Worried about Lia's safety, the heavily wounded former sect leader instructs his captive to call Apollo.
202	39	"Echoes of Urgency"	"Inosente"	August 24, 2023	7.7%
Apollo urges Lia to leave her captor behind and wait for him while hiding in a safe place. Joseph's walls crumble as his captive chooses to show him kindness and forgiveness despite the atrocities he committed.
203	40	"In The Nick of Time"	"Reconcile"	August 25, 2023	7.3%
As Dylan and his men manage to track them down, Joseph risks his life to protect Lia until Apollo arrives. A tragic fate soon befalls the former sect leader, but not before giving the Tatsulok head vital information about Altare.
204	41	"The Fight Continues"	"Utos"	August 28, 2023	6.8%
Menandro reveals to Harmonia that Priam is still alive. Apollo brims with joy as Lia gets reunited with Hector, Troy, and Cronus. Draco steals the mysterious device in Kules' possession.
205	42	"Strategic Maneuvers"	"Plano"	August 29, 2023	6.4%
Aware that Altare has more men and arms than Tatsulok, Apollo comes up with a way to outmaneuver the transnational crime organization. Iris asks Troy and Cronus for help. Eros gives his generals the green light to hunt down his old ally.
206	43	"Black Book"	"Vault"	August 30, 2023	7.6%
Orcus, Romulo, and Draco break into Joseph's old hideout and take everything that may lead them to Atlantis, including a mysterious black book. Meanwhile, Selene remains skeptical of Apollo's plans for Tatsulok.
207	44	"Covert Assault"	"Ambush"	August 31, 2023	6.7%
Orcus and his men get ambushed while transporting important cargo. Meeting at a church, Eros vows to hunt down Apollo when the former agent rejects his aid and resolves to survive outside the law.
208	45	"Stealthy Snatch"	"Weakness"	September 1, 2023	6.4%
Selene and Draco follow the signals from the mysterious device Priam entrusted to Nyx until it leads them to an abandoned building. While Eros prepares his subordinates for Apollo's retaliation, the former agent sets his plans in motion.
209	46	"Inescapable Cofrontation"	"Interrogation"	September 4, 2023	6.7%
Just as Nyx and Romulo wrap up a deal with one of Tatsulok's clients, Eros and the CIB arrive to arrest them. Aiming to find out where Atlantis is, Apollo abducts two of Altare's highest-ranking officers.
210	47	"Chasing Hidden Truths"	"Investigate"	September 5, 2023	7.0%
After capturing Circe, Menandro lashes out at Eros for failing to nab Nyx. Troy and Cronus find strange cards inside the room of Iris' late boyfriend. Theo finds clues about Atlantis while Draco tortures Cian.
211	48	"Atlantis Faux Real"	"Trap"	September 6, 2023	6.9%
Circe remains tight-lipped about the identity of Altare's leader despite Menandro's intimidation. Upon arriving in Lerna, Apollo and Orcus realize the trap set against them and soon come to blows with Aion and Clio.
212	49	"Betrayed in the Shadows"	"Apollo vs. Commando"	September 7, 2023	7.4%
Apollo corners Commando, only to be shocked after seeing the face of Altare’s elusive leader. Nyx fails to rein in her rage when Orcus returns with bad news. Menandro orders the CIB to arrest one of his most trusted agents.
213	50	"Sequential Disclosures"	"Revelation"	September 8, 2023	6.8%
After revealing Commando's identity, Apollo shocks the Tatsulok members when he confirms Selene's hunch that Priam is still alive and decides to save him from captivity. Unknown to them, Menandro plans to transfer Priam to a new hiding place.
214	51	"Escape Plan"	"Itatakas"	September 11, 2023	7.8%
Eros tries to convince Nyx to choose his side. Iris brings Troy, Cronus, and Kules to an abandoned house where her late boyfriend dealt with clients. Apollo and his men go all out in a bid to rescue Priam.
215	52	"Extraction"	"Extraction"	September 12, 2023	7.7%
While Apollo leads Tatsulok's mission to extract Priam from one of CIB's heavily guarded facilities, Eros is forced to bare his fangs when he gets arrested by authorities.
216	53	"New Alliance"	"Kakampi"	September 13, 2023	7.7%
After eliminating Menandro and gaining the trust of Tatsulok members, Apollo works with Priam to bring down Eros and the Altare. Kules, Troy, Cronus, and Iris obtain a package containing an illegal substance.
217	54	"Retribution"	"Kompetisyon"	September 14, 2023	7.7%
Marcus informs Eros that their boss is not happy with his failures. Circe escapes from the CIB with the help of her men. Dylan convinces most of Tatsulok's longtime clients to start dealing with Altare instead.
218	55	"Endless Reprisal"	"Gantihan"	September 15, 2023	7.9%
Tatsulok manages to outsmart Altare, but a furious Commando wastes no time seeking revenge. Because of this, Apollo comes up with a plan to stop their rival group from getting in their way.
219	56	"Truce Gambit"	"Face Off"	September 18, 2023	8.1%
The air grows thick with tension as members of Tatsulok and Altare keep their eyes peeled while Apollo and Eros start negotiating about the future of their clashing groups.
220	57	"Power Play"	"Ceasefire"	September 19, 2023	7.7%
A brewing storm threatens to break the parley's facade of calmness and peace as both Apollo and Eros remain adamant in protecting their groups' interests. Troy grows concerned for Iris as he and his friends wait outside the troubled woman's door.
221	58	"The Long-Awaited Discovery"	"Atlantis"	September 20, 2023	7.6%
As the tension between Tatsulok and Altare intensifies, Apollo leaves no stone unturned to locate Atlantis until the clues he obtains point him to Kules' family. Selene carries out a secret task for Priam.
222	59	"Ties That Bind"	"Loyalty"	September 21, 2023	7.9%
Circe, Aion, and Clio express their loyalty to Altare by recalling how the organization gave them purpose. Priam hands Apollo the only thing he cherishes most. Nyx gets abducted while heading to the Tatsulok headquarters.
223	60	"Infiltration at Dawn"	"Pagsaway"	September 22, 2023	7.1%
Nyx sends Eros on a wild goose chase. Despite Selene's opposition, Apollo pushes through with his plan to destroy Atlantis and entrusts the mission to Draco. Unbeknownst to ther, their dissenting member devises a scheme of her own.
224	61	"Tatsulok's Offense"	"Pagsugod"	September 25, 2023	8.1%
Selene disobeys Apollo's orders and pushes through with her plan to take over Atlantis. Eros spends a romantic night with Nyx, unaware of the danger faced by Altar's most valuable asset.
225	62	"Take Over"	"Take Over"	September 26, 2023	8.6%
Nyx reins in her emotions and refuses to join Eros's side. After reconciling with his friend, Cronus vows to help Troy find Iris. Apollo resolves to burn Atlantis down as he comes up with a strategy to rescue Selene, Orcus, and Rhea.
226	63	"Altare's Resurge"	"Salpukan"	September 27, 2023	8.6%
As Altare arrives in Atlantis, Apollo orders Draco to rescue Selene and Orcus first before burning the plantation to ashes. Selene is forced to make a decision when Circe holds Rhea hostage, unaware of how a simple mistake may cost her own life.
227	64	"Declaration of War"	"Pagsunog"	September 28, 2023	9.4%
Orcus arrives just in time to save Selene from Circe. Apollo orders Draco to distract the enemy forces to make the escape of other Tatsulok members easier. While Atlantis burns, Priam heads to Altare's headquarters.
228	65	"Commando in Flux"	"High Table"	September 29, 2023	8.6%
Priam proposes a deal to Altare's top leader. Apollo admonishes Selene and Orcus for disobeying his orders. While spying on Tatsulok, Eros is taken aback as he catches sight of a familiar face.
229	66	"Vying for the Throne"	"Power Struggle"	October 2, 2023	8.0%
Selene apologizes to Apollo for questioning his plans and disobeying him. Following Atlantis’ downfall, Eros plans to diversify Altare’s sources of income. Troy and Cronus retrieve a parcel addressed to Iris.
230	67	"Past Choices, Present Effects"	"Hari-Harian"	October 3, 2023	8.1%
Marcus informs Priam that he needs to accomplish an important mission before becoming the new Commando. Eros informs Apollo that Engineer is negotiating with Altare.
231	68	"Pushing the Envelope"	"Misyon"	October 4, 2023	8.3%
After revealing his plans to Tatsulok's high-ranking members, Priam gives Apollo an important mission. Eros rallies his remaining loyal followers before launching an attack against the Dela Torres.
232	69	"Daring Retrieval"	"Laban"	October 5, 2023	8.9%
Escaping from Eros' ambush, Apollo orders Tatsulok to launch an all-out attack against Altare. Soon, he and Priam work together as they try to protect and escort Icarus out of the country.
233	70	"Agent from the Outset"	"The Truth"	October 6, 2023	7.1%
Priam's bid to become the new Commando takes an unexpected turn when his trusted right-hand man emerges as a double agent who only uses him to accomplish a mission.
234	71	"Betreyal, Consequences and Sabotage"	"Sabotahe"	October 9, 2023	7.8%
Priam makes a shocking move while his son is urging him to side with justice and face his crimes. Later, Harmonia informs Apollo that they need the information in Icarus’ phone in order to finally bring down Altare.
235	72	"A Tragic Loss"	"Casualty"	October 10, 2023	9.0%
Nyx informs Apollo and the CIB about Eros' whereabouts, leading to an intense chase that ends with a casualty. Troy, Iris, and Cronus decide to turn on the phone in their possession, unaware of the danger coming their way.
236	73	"A Dangerous Pursuit"	"Greed"	October 11, 2023	8.8%
Apollo goes on a dangerous pursuit after Eros' towering greed puts Troy's life on the line. Dylan makes a sacrifice for the remaining Tatsulok members as the CIB takes advantage of their mourning.
237	74	"Ride or Die"	"Japan"	October 12, 2023	8.0%
Selene and Orcus make a desperate attempt to escape from the CIB. Waking up after getting knocked down, Apollo fights for his life as Altare men try to seize him, only to be surprised when he finds himself in the center of Tokyo, Japan.
238	75	"The Finale"	"Ultimate Ride"	October 13, 2023	8.7%
Apollo and Eros reconcile as the latter surrenders Altare's contacts, but an unforeseen move from the crime syndicate cuts short their reunion. While Selene and Orcus build a new life together, a new mission starts for Apollo.
