= Sydney Chin =

Malaysian wushu practitioner

Personal information
- Born: Sydney Chin Sy Xuan; 16 August 1999 (age 27)
- Occupations: Martial artist, athlete

Sport
- Sport: Wushu
- Events: Taijiquan, Taijijian
- Team: Malaysia Wushu Team
Medal record
Women's Wushu Taolu
Representing Malaysia
World Games
Bronze medal – third place	2025 Chengdu	Taijiquan / Taijijian
World Cup
Bronze medal – third place	2024 Yokohama	Taijiquan
World Championships
Silver medal – second place	2023 Fort Worth	Taijijian
World University Championships
Bronze medal – third place	2018 Macau	Taijiquan
Asian Championships
Bronze medal – third place	2024 Macau	Taijiquan Doubles
Asian Cup
Silver medal – second place	2025 Songyuan	Pair Taijiquan
SEA Games
Gold medal – first place	2025 Thailand	Duilian Bare-handed
Silver medal – second place	2023 Cambodia	Taijijian + Taijiquan
Bronze medal – third place	2025 Thailand	Taijijian + Taijiquan
Bronze medal – third place	2021 Vietnam	Taijiquan

Sydney Chin Sy Xuan (Chinese: 陈书文; pinyin: Chén Shūwén; born 16 August 1999) is a Malaysian wushu taolu athlete specialising in taijiquan and taijijian.

== Career ==
At the 2018 World University Wushu Championships, Chin won the bronze medal in the taijiquan.

Chin competed in the 2021 Southeast Asian Games (hosted in 2022) where she won the bronze medal in taijiquan.

At the 2023 SEA Games, Chin won the silver medal in taijiquan / taijijian. Several months later, she competed in the 2022 Asian Games (hosted in 2023) in Hangzhou, China, where she finished in fourth place women's taijiquan, finishing behind Chen Suijin who won the bronze medal. She then competed in the 2023 World Wushu Championships in Fort Worth, United States, where she won the silver medal.

Several months later, Chin competed in the 2024 Asian Wushu Championships and won the bronze medal in taijiquan doubles. Shortly after, she won the bronze medal in taijiquan at the 2024 Taolu World Cup.

A year later, Chin won a silver medal in pair taijiquan at the 2025 Asian Taolu Cup. At the 2025 World Games, she won the bronze medal in Taijiquan / Taijijian. At the 2025 SEA Games, she won a gold medal in duilian bare-handed and the bronze medal in the Taijijian + Taijiquan.
