= Wushu at the 2018 Asian Games – Women's taijiquan & taijijian =

Women's taijiquan & taijijian at the 2018 Asian Games
- Venue: Jakarta International Expo
- Dates: 19–20 August 2018
- Competitors: 16 from 14 nations

Medalists
gold medal	Lindswell Kwok	Indonesia
silver medal	Juanita Mok	Hong Kong
bronze medal	Agatha Wong	Philippines

The women's taijiquan and taijijian competition at the 2018 Asian Games was held from 19 to 20 August at the Jakarta International Expo.

== Schedule ==
All times are Western Indonesia Time (UTC+07:00)

Date	Time	Event
Sunday, 19 August 2018	09:00	Taijiquan
Monday, 20 August 2018	09:00	Taijijian

== Results ==
Rank	Athlete	Taijiquan	Taijijian	Total
1st place, gold medalist(s)	Lindswell Kwok (INA)	9.75	9.75	19.50
2nd place, silver medalist(s)	Juanita Mok (HKG)	9.71	9.71	19.42
3rd place, bronze medalist(s)	Agatha Wong (PHI)	9.68	9.68	19.36
4	Trần Thị Khánh Ly (VIE)	9.68	9.66	19.34
5	Vera Tan (SGP)	9.66	9.67	19.33
6	Ho Lin Ying (SGP)	9.65	9.65	19.30
7	Audrey Chan (MAS)	9.56	9.65	19.21
8	Ang Guat Lian (BRU)	9.66	9.51	19.17
9	Shiho Saito (JPN)	9.53	9.57	19.10
10	Myat Noe Eain (MYA)	9.48	9.56	19.04
11	L. Sanatombi Chanu (IND)	9.35	9.63	18.98
12	Chuang Chia-wen (TPE)	9.47	9.42	18.89
13	Basma Lachkar (BRU)	9.68	9.08	18.76
14	Ho Pui Kei (MAC)	9.55	8.86	18.41
15	Anel Sanatkyzy (KAZ)	7.85	7.99	15.84
16	Samreen Altaf (PAK)	6.90	6.62	13.52
