= Wushu at the 1991 SEA Games =

- Dates: November 30-December 2, 1991

Wushu at the 1991 Southeast Asian Games was held in the Philippines from November 30 to December 2, 1991. This was the first time wushu at the SEA Games was contested, and the second time after wushu's appearance at the 1990 Asian Games that the sport was included in a multi-sport event.

== Medal table ==
* Host nation (Philippines)

Rank	Nation	Gold	Silver	Bronze	Total
1	Philippines (PHI)*	10	4	8	22
2	Malaysia (MAS)	3	2	1	6
3	Singapore (SIN)	1	5	3	9
Totals (3 entries)		14	11	12	37

== Medalists ==
=== Men's taolu ===
Event	Gold	Silver	Bronze
Changquan	Choy Yeen Onn; Malaysia	unknown	Bobby Hongliangyi; Philippines; Lester Pimentel; Philippines
Daoshu	Bobby Hongliangyi; Philippines	unknown Singapore	Joseph Du; Philippines
Jianshu	Samson Co; Philippines	unknown	unknown
Gunshu	Choy Yee Onn; Malaysia	Bobby Hongliangyi; Philippines	Lester Pimentel; Philippines
Qiangshu	Samson Co; Philippines	Phoon Chee Kong; Malaysia	Edward Pimentel; Philippines
Nanquan	Richard Ng; Philippines	unknown	Joseph Wuxinyi; Philippines
Taijiquan	Daniel Co; Philippines	Puan Jodi Eong; Singapore	unknown

=== Women's talou ===
Event	Gold	Silver	Bronze
Changquan	Jennifer Yeo; Philippines	Chua Sze Muay; Singapore	Chiew Hui Yan; Singapore
Daoshu	See Ah Hoon; Singapore	Catherine Hau; Philippines	Chua Son Hua; Malaysia
Jianshu	Jennifer Yeo; Philippines	unknown	Chiew Hui Yan; Singapore
Gunshu	Jennifer Yeo; Philippines	Ng Kwai Yin; Malaysia	Jeanie Jane Santos; Philippines
Qiangshu	Mian-Mian Shi; Philippines	Stephanie Lim; Philippines	Chua Sze Muay; Singapore
Nanquan	Ng Kwai Yin; Malaysia	See Ah Hoon; Singapore	Mian-Mian Shi; Philippines
Taijiquan	Rosaria Maria Dijamco; Philippines	Catherine Hau; Philippines; Tan Mui Buay; Singapore	shared silver
