= Hiroshi Yoshida (wushu) =

Japanese wushu practitioner

Sport
- Sport: Wushu
- Events: Changquan, Daoshu, Gunshu
Medal record
Representing Japan
Men's Wushu Taolu
World Wushu Championships
| Gold medal – first place | 1995 Baltimore | Daoshu |
| Silver medal – second place | 1995 Baltimore | Gunshu |
| Bronze medal – third place | 1993 Kuala Lumpur | Gunshu |
| Bronze medal – third place | 1995 Baltimore | Changquan |
Asian Games
| Bronze medal – third place | 1994 Hiroshima | CQ All-Around |

Hiroshi Yoshida is a former wushu taolu athlete from Japan. He is a four-time medalist at the World Wushu Championships and is a one-time world champion. He also won the bronze medal in men's changquan at the 1994 Asian Games.

== See also ==
- List of Asian Games medalists in wushu
