= Achmad Hulaefi =

Indonesian wushu practitioner

Personal information
- Born: October 14, 1989 (age 36) Jakarta, Indonesia
- Education: State University of Jakarta
- Spouse: Lindswell Kwok

Sport
- Sport: Wushu
- Events: Changquan, Daoshu, Gunshu
- Team: Indonesia wushu team
Medal record
Men's wushu taolu
Representing Indonesia
World Championships
Silver medal – second place	2017 Kazan	Changquan
Silver medal – second place	2017 Kazan	Gunshu
Taolu World Cup
Gold medal – first place	2016 Fuzhou	Daoshu
Gold medal – first place	2016 Fuzhou	Gunshu
Silver medal – second place	2016 Fuzhou	Changquan
Asian Games
Bronze medal – third place	2018 Jakarta–Palembang	Daoshu+Gunshu
Islamic Solidarity Games
Gold medal – first place	2013 Palembang	Daoshu+Gunshu
SEA Games
Gold medal – first place	2011 Jakarta–Palembang	Daoshu+Gunshu
Gold medal – first place	2013 Naypyidaw	Daoshu
Gold medal – first place	2013 Naypyidaw	Gunshu
Gold medal – first place	2015 Singapore	Gunshu
Silver medal – second place	2013 Naypyidaw	Changquan
Silver medal – second place	2015 Singapore	Daoshu
Silver medal – second place	2017 Kuala Lumpur	Daoshu+Gunshu
Bronze medal – third place	2011 Jakarta–Palembang	Changquan
ASEAN University Games
Gold medal – first place	2014 Palembang	Changquan
World Junior Championships
Bronze medal – third place	2006 Kuala Lumpur	Daoshu
Asian Junior Championships
Silver medal – second place	2005 Singapore	Daoshu

Achmad Hulaefi (born October 14, 1989) is a former wushu taolu athlete from Indonesia.

== Career ==
=== Junior ===
Hulaefi made his international debut at the 2005 Asian Junior Wushu Championships where he won a silver medal in daoshu. A year later, he won the bronze medal in daoshu at the 2006 World Junior Wushu Championships.

=== Senior ===
2011 SEA Games where he won the gold medal in daoshu and gunshu combined and a bronze medal in changquan. At the 2013 SEA Games, he was a double gold medalist in both events, and also won a silver medal in changquan. He also won a gold medal at the 2013 Islamic Solidarity Games shortly after. Two years later at the 2015 SEA Games, he won a gold and silver medal in his weapon specialties. At the 2017 SEA Games, he only won the silver medal in daoshu and gunshu combined, but later that year, he won his first medals at the 2017 World Wushu Championships which included silver medals in changquan and gunshu. A year later at the 2018 Asian Games, he won the bronze medal in men's daoshu and gunshu. He subsequently retired from competition.

== Personal life ==
Hulaefi married teammate Lindswell Kwok shortly after the 2018 Asian Games in December of the same year.

== See also ==
- List of Asian Games medalists in wushu
