= Vincent Ng =

Singaporean actor and martial artist (born 1975)

- Born: 6 December 1975 (age 50); Singapore
- Other name: Weng Qinghai
- Occupations: Actor; martial artist; businessman
- Years active: 1997–present
- Spouse: Mei Ling (m. 2017)
- Children: 1
- Website: http://www.wufangsingapore.com

Vincent Ng
- Traditional Chinese: 翁清海
- Simplified Chinese: 翁清海
Transcriptions
Standard Mandarin
- Hanyu Pinyin: Wēng Qīnghǎi

Medal record

Men's Wushu Taolu

Representing Singapore

World Championships
Gold medal – first place	1995 Baltimore	Daoshu
Silver medal – second place	1993 Kuala Lumpur	Gunshu
Silver medal – second place	1997 Rome	Changquan
Bronze medal – third place	1993 Kuala Lumpur	Jianshu
Bronze medal – third place	1995 Baltimore	Gunshu

SEA Games
Gold medal – first place	1993 Singapore	Changquan
Gold medal – first place	1997 Jakarta	Changquan
Gold medal – first place	1997 Jakarta	Daoshu
Silver medal – second place	1993 Singapore	Daoshu
Silver medal – second place	1993 Singapore	Gunshu

Vincent Ng Cheng Hye (born 6 December 1975) is a Singaporean actor, martial artist and businessman. He was a full-time Mediacorp actor from 1997 to 2007, and is best known for acting in the Chinese-language television series produced by MediaCorp Channel 8.

== Education ==
Ng had an engineering certificate from the Institute of Technical Education.

== Career ==
=== Acting ===
Ng joined MediaCorp after reaching the finals of Star Search Singapore in 1997. His first foray into English-language television was in the 2002 Channel 5 series Heartlanders in which he played one of the lead characters. As he was one of the few artistes with any formal training in martial arts, he was frequently cast in period and wuxia television series or in characters requiring fight scenes. He left the entertainment industry in November 2007 to concentrate on running Wufang.

=== Wushu ===
Ng competed in the 1993 SEA Games and was a triple-medalist including a gold medalist in changquan. The same year, he competed in the 1993 World Wushu Championships and won a silver medal in gunshu and bronze medal in qiangshu. A year later, he competed in the 1994 Asian Games and finished eighth in the men's changquan all-around event. The next year at the 1995 World Wushu Championships, Ng won a gold medal in daoshu and a bronze medal in gunshu. Two years later at the 1997 SEA Games, he won gold medals in changquan and daoshu. Short after, he won a silver medal in changquan at the 1997 World Wushu Championships. His last competition was at the 1998 Asian Games where he competed in the men's changquan all-around event and finished in ninth place.

Ng had choreographed and performed at the 2006 National Day Parade martial arts display. He published and released his first exercise and fitness book, TEN. In 2011, Ng was nominated for the Spirit of Enterprise Award in recognition for his work in wushu training. As of 2019, he is a member of the International Wushu Federation Technical Committee.

==== Martial arts school ====
In 2004, Ng founded Wufang Singapore, a martial arts school. In 2015, two of his students obtained gold medals in the 2015 SEA Games.

== Personal life ==
Ng has two sisters.

Ng married Mei Ling on 14 July 2017, after having been introduced by mutual friends in January 2017. Their son was born on 30 August 2018.

== Filmography ==
=== Television series ===
Year	Title	Role	Notes	Ref.
1997	Sword and Honour (铁血男儿)			
1998	Legend of the Eight Immortals	Sun Wukong		
1998	Myths and Legends of Singapore (石叻破传说)	Lin Shunfu		
1998	Facing the Music	Huang Qiguang		
1999	Hero of the Times	Nalan Dekai		
1999	Legends of Nezha (莲花童子－哪吒)			
2000	Hainan Kopi Tales	Yongling		
2001	Heroes in Black	Fan Yuan	Nominated - Best Supporting Actor, 2001 Star Awards	
2001	The Challenge (谁与争锋)	Zilong		
2002	Health Matters (一切由慎开始)			
2002-2005	Heartlanders	Corporal Ricky Soh		
2004	My Mighty-in-Laws	Fang Zhengde		
2005	Green Pals (绿色果实)	Shao Jiayi		
2007	Honour and Passion	Ben		
2007	Like Father, Like Daughter	Ah Wei		
2007	Man of the House	Zhen Jianyi	Singapore-Malaysia co-production	
2009	The Scarlet Kid (红孩儿)		Co-production	
2013	The Dream Makers	Ding Wei		

=== Film ===
Year	Title	Role	Notes
2022	Deleted	Vincent Yong	

== Awards and nominations ==
Year	Ceremony	Accolade	Nominated work	Result	Ref.
1998	Star Awards	Best Newcomer	Sword and Honour	Nominated	
1999	Star Awards	Top 10 Most Popular Male Artistes	—N/a	Nominated	
2000	Star Awards	Best Supporting Actor	Hainan Kopi Tales (as Long Yonglin)	Nominated	
2000	Star Awards	Top 10 Most Popular Male Artistes	—N/a	Won	
2001	Star Awards	Best Supporting Actor	Heroes in Black (as Fan Yuan)	Nominated	
2001	Star Awards	Top 10 Most Popular Male Artistes	—N/a	Won	
2002	Star Awards	Top 10 Most Popular Male Artistes	—N/a	Nominated	
2003	Star Awards	Top 10 Most Popular Male Artistes	—N/a	Nominated	
2004	Star Awards	Top 10 Most Popular Male Artistes	—N/a	Won	
2005	Star Awards	Top 10 Most Popular Male Artistes	—N/a	Won	
2006	Star Awards	Top 10 Most Popular Male Artistes	—N/a	Won	

== See also ==
- List of Singapore world champions in sports
