= Lester Pimentel =

Filipino-Chinese wushu practitioner

Lester Pimentel Ong
- Other name: Direk Lester
- Known for: Wushu, Entrepreneurship, Film Directing
- Sports career
- National team: Philippines
- Sport: Wushu
- Event(s): Changquan, Jianshu, Gunshu
Medal record
Men's Wushu Taolu
Representing Philippines
World Championships
Gold medal – first place	1995 Baltimore	Jianshu
World Traditional Championships
Gold medal – first place	2006 Zhengzhou	Nanquan
Asian Championships
Gold medal – first place	1996 Manila	Jianshu
SEA Games
Gold medal – first place	2005 Manila	Duilian
Bronze medal – third place	1991 Manila	Changquan
Bronze medal – third place	1991 Manila	Gunshu

Lester Pimentel Ong is a Filipino-Chinese businessman, filmmaker, stuntman, and retired competitive wushu taolu athlete.

== Education ==
Pimentel started his studies in Chiang Kai Shek College then transferred to Philippine Cultural High School for elementary and high school. In college, he pursued A.B. Philosophy at De La Salle University and graduated in 1995.

== Wushu career ==
Pimentel made his international debut at the 1991 SEA Games where he won bronze medals in changquan and gunshu. Years later, he became the world champion in jianshu at the 1995 World Wushu Championships. The following year he also became the Asian champion in jianshu at the 1996 Asian Wushu Championships. He decided to take a break from practicing wushu and focus on school graduation.

Several years later, Pimentel returned to wushu competition for the 2005 SEA Games where he won the gold medal in duilian. He also took part at the 2006 World Traditional Wushu Championships in Zhengzhou winning another gold.

== Business career ==
After graduating school in 1997, Pimentel decided to work as a stockbroker before going broke due to the 1997 Asian financial crisis. In 2000, he founded Rice in a Box, a fastfood place which serves fried rice with toppings. The first location was in Pasay and has grown to over 100 franchises across the Philippines, thus Ong's company grew to become the Binondo Food Group.

Following the impact of RBX, he then established Wangfu Chinese Café, a Singaporean-Chinese restaurant in 2012. He introduced the rich flavors of Singapore to the Filipinos at prices that are within their budget.

In 2018, he opened his first Kyu Kyu Ramen 99.

Aside from opening affordable local brands to the Philippines, he also ventured into bringing foreign brands in the country.

During one of his frequent flights in Singapore, he got to taste Udders Ice Cream, the official ice cream of Singapore Airlines. He was delighted with the flavors and decided to bring the brand to his country. In 2023, he opened his first branch of Udders Ice Cream in SM North EDSA.

He also franchised Dean and Deluca, a gourmet food retailer.

== Film and television ==
While working in the corporate world, he sidelined as a stunt actor, which did not only provide him an extra source of income but also an avenue for him to continue practicing martial arts. His first project was the 2000 film Ex-Con which was directed by Toto Natividad and starred Victor Neri. As a fight director he was involved in Panday, Lastikman, Imortal and Indio.

He was involved in La Luna Sangre and Bagani. He is the director of the Amazon Prime Video original Filipino series One Good Day.

From his love for martial arts and the film industry, he established, Action 360, a talent management firm specializing in action actors and action directors.

Following his passion for filmmaking, he built his own production company, Studio Three Sixty in 2021. He has already produced 2 projects: a romantic movie, entitled, ‘Love You Long Time’ and ‘One Good Day’, a TV mini series exclusively shown in Amazon Prime Video.

In 2022, Pimentel directed The Iron Heart which became known for its stunts work.

== Personal life ==
Pimentel is a third-generation Filipino-Chinese. He is married to Rossettee, and has five sons.
