= 2018 World University Wushu Championships =

1st edition of the World University Wushu Championships

- Host city: Macau, China
- Dates: 2–5 August
- Main venue: Macau Forum

The 2018 World University Wushu Championships is the 1st World University Wushu Championship organized by the International University Sports Federation (FISU). The competition consisted of taolu and sanda events.

== Medal table ==
* Host nation (Macau)

Rank	Nation	Gold	Silver	Bronze	Total
1	China (CHN)	7	1	0	8
2	Iran (IRI)	4	0	0	4
3	Malaysia (MAS)	3	2	3	8
4	Indonesia (INA)	2	3	2	7
5	Japan (JPN)	2	1	1	4
6	Macau (MAC)*	1	2	2	5
7	Hong Kong (HKG)	1	1	2	4
8	Russia (RUS)	0	4	2	6
9	Turkey (TUR)	0	3	1	4
10	Chinese Taipei (TPE)	0	2	2	4
11	France (FRA)	0	0	2	2
11	United States (USA)	0	0	2	2
13	Brazil (BRA)	0	0	1	1
13	Brunei (BRU)	0	0	1	1
13	Canada (CAN)	0	0	1	1
13	Ukraine (UKR)	0	0	1	1
Totals (16 entries)		20	19	23	62

== Results ==
=== Men's taolu ===
Event	Gold	Silver	Bronze
Changquan	Li Wangzhen; China	Khaw Jun Lim; Malaysia	Sergei Badrutdinov; Russia
Daoshu	Khaw Jun Lim; Malaysia	Sergei Badrutdinov; Russia	Lin Yi-Zhe; Chinese Taipei
Gunshu	Khaw Jun Lim; Malaysia	Sergei Badrutdinov; Russia	Cheong Wai Seng; Macau
Nanquan	Chio Wai Keong; Macau	Ajinata William; Indonesia	Halil Kalayci; Turkey
Nangun	Yoshitaka Asayama; Japan	Chio Wai Keong; Macau	Ajinata William; Indonesia
Taijiquan	Loh Choon How; Malaysia	Kuo Po-Chun; Chinese Taipei	Ryo Murakami; Japan
Taijijian	Wang Jingshen; China	Ka Seng Chong; Macau	Yeung Chung Hei; Hong Kong

=== Men's sanda ===
Event	Gold	Silver	Bronze
52 kg	Yuan Peng; China	Mehmet Demirci; Turkey	Gadzhimurad Akhmedov; Russia
52 kg	Yuan Peng; China	Mehmet Demirci; Turkey	none awarded
60 kg	Alireza Riki; Iran	Xiao Bokun; China	Yanis Bouaza; France
60 kg	Alireza Riki; Iran	Xiao Bokun; China	Kan Kai Wa; Macau
70 kg	Hamidreza Sahandi; Iran	Nusret Altunkaya; Turkey	Johnny Choi; Canada
70 kg	Hamidreza Sahandi; Iran	Nusret Altunkaya; Turkey	Lin Hsiu-Wen; Chinese Taipei
80 kg	Yunus Batan; Turkey	Davi Oliveira; Brazil	
80 kg	Yunus Batan; Turkey	Nathan Racinet; France	none awarded

=== Women's taolu ===
Event	Gold	Silver	Bronze
Changquan	Natalie Chriselda Tanasa; Indonesia	Lin Yi-Ping; Chinese Taipei	Cheah Aggie Ruey Shin; Malaysia
Jianshu	Natalie Chriselda Tanasa; Indonesia	Ayaka Honda; Japan	Cheah Aggie Ruey Shin; Malaysia
Qiangshu	Ayaka Honda; Japan	Cheah Aggie Ruey Shin; Malaysia	Natalie Chriselda Tanasa; Indonesia
Nanquan	Chen Huiying; China	Daria Gerasimova; Russia	Lucy Lee; United States
Nandao	Chen Huiying; China	Daria Gerasimova; Russia	Lucy Lee; United States
Taijiquan	Wang Xiaohui; China	Mok Uen Ying Juanita; Hong Kong	Sydney Chin Sy Xuan; Malaysia
Taijijian	Mok Uen Ying Juanita; Hong Kong	Kamilia Lituhayu; Indonesia	Ang Guat Lian; Brunei

=== Women's sanda ===
Event	Gold	Silver	Bronze
52 kg	Dai Shimeng; China	Simanjuntak Rosalina; Indonesia	Olena Riabokin; Ukraine
52 kg	Dai Shimeng; China	Simanjuntak Rosalina; Indonesia	Lau Ching Ching; Hong Kong
60 kg	Zohreh Shahpari; Iran	none awarded	none awarded
60 kg	Zohreh Shahpari; Iran	none awarded	none awarded

== See also ==
- Wushu at the Summer Universiade
