= Jennifer Yeo =

Filipino wushu practitioner

Sport
- Sport: Wushu
- Event(s): Changquan, Jianshu, Gunshu
- Team: Philippines Wushu Team
Medal record
Women's Wushu Taolu
Representing Philippines
World Championships
Bronze medal – third place	1991 Beijing	Gunshu
Bronze medal – third place	1993 Kuala Lumpur	Gunshu
SEA Games
Gold medal – first place	1991 Manila	Changquan
Gold medal – first place	1991 Manila	Gunshu
Gold medal – first place	1991 Manila	Jianshu
Gold medal – first place	1993 Singapore	Changquan
Gold medal – first place	1993 Singapore	Gunshu
Silver medal – second place	1993 Singapore	Jianshu

Jennifer Yeo is a retired competitive wushu taolu athlete from the Philippines.

== Career ==
Yeo made her international debut at the 1991 World Wushu Championships where she won a bronze medal in gunshu. A few months later, she competed at the 1991 SEA Games where she won three gold medals in changquan, gunshu, and jianshu, thus becoming the most decorated athlete at the event. Over a year later, she appeared at the 1993 SEA Games and won gold medals in changquan and gunshu, and a silver medal in jianshu. Shortly after, she competed at the 1993 World Wushu Championships where she won another bronze medal in gunshu.
