= List of 2013 World Games medal winners =

World Games medalists

The 2013 World Games were held in Cali, Colombia, from July 25 to August 4, 2013.

== Acrobatic gymnastics ==
Event	Gold	Silver	Bronze
Men's pair	Russia; Konstantin Pilipchuk; Alexei Dudchenko	Great Britain; Alex Houston; Tim Pritchard	Belarus; Ruslan Fedchanka; Yauheni Kalachou
Men's group	China; Zhou Yi; Tang Jian; Wu Yeqiuyin; Wang Lei	Russia; Maksim Chulkov; Valentin Chetverkin; Dmitry Bryzgalov; Aleksandr Kurasov	Ukraine; Oleksii Lesyk; Viktor Iaremchuk; Oleksandr Nelep; Andrii Kozynko
Women's pair	Great Britain; Shanie-Redd Thorne; Danielle Jones	Ukraine; Kateryna Sytnikova; Anastasiya Melnychenko	Belarus; Sviatlana Mikhnevich; Yana Yanusik
Women's group	Russia; Ekaterina Stroynova; Aigul Shaikhutdinova; Ekaterina Loginova	Great Britain; Georgia Lancaster; Millie Spalding; Elise Matthews	Belarus; Yuliya Khrypach; Hanna Kobyzeva; Julia Kovalenko
Mixed pair	Great Britain; Dominic Smith; Alice Upcott	Portugal; Gonçalo Roque; Leonor Oliveira	Belgium; Nicolas Vleeshouwers; Laure De Pryck

== Aerobic gymnastics ==
Event	Gold	Silver	Bronze
Men's individual	Benjamin Garavel; France	Vicente Lli; Spain	Ryu Ju-sun; South Korea
Women's individual	Corina Constantin; Romania	Sara Moreno; Spain	Lubov Gazov; Austria
Mixed pair	Spain; Vicente Lli; Sara Moreno	Shared gold	Shared gold
Mixed pair	France; Benjamin Garavel; Aurélie Joly	Shared gold	Shared gold
Mixed pair	Romania; Marius Petrușe; Bianca Becze	Shared gold	Shared gold
Mixed pair	Vietnam; Vũ Bá Đông; Trần Thị Thu Hà	Shared gold	Shared gold
Trio	China; Wang Zizhuo; Che Lei; Han Mingzhe	Romania; Anca Surdu; Corina Constantin; Andreea Bogati	Russia; Aleksandr Kondratichev; Denis Soloviev; Dukhik Dzhanazian
Group	China; Hu Bangda; Wang Zizhuo; Yang Guang; Che Lei; Han Mingzhe	Romania; Bianca Becze; Anca Surdu; Diana Deac; Corina Constantin; Andreea Bogati	France; Mathieu Deliers; Maxime Decker-Breitel; Benjamin Garavel; Jonathan Gajdane; David Orta
Step	China; Zou Qin; Shou Minchao; Tu Zitong; Dong Shilin; Li Zhi; Ma Ye; Yin Lu; Yu Yangyang	Russia; Danil Chaiun; Evgenia Kudymova; Irina Dobriagina; Oxana Trukhacheva; Polina Polyanskikh; Aleksey Germanov; Veronika Korneva; Denis Shurupov	France; Mathieu Deliers; Gavin Jourdan; Maxime Decker-Breitel; Chrystel Lejeune; Jonathan Gajdane; David Orta; Nicolas Garavel; Clara Baraquet
Dance	China; Zou Qin; Shou Minchao; Tu Zitong; Tao Le; Li Zhi; Ma Chao; Yang Guang; Yu Yangyang	Romania; Bianca Becze; Dacian Barna; Anca Surdu; Diana Deac; Marius Petrușe; Andreea Bogati; Cristian Iordan; Marius Gavriloaie	Shared silver
Dance	China; Zou Qin; Shou Minchao; Tu Zitong; Tao Le; Li Zhi; Ma Chao; Yang Guang; Yu Yangyang	Russia; Evgenia Kudymova; Igor Trushkov; Aleksey Germanov; Danil Chaiun; Oxana Trukhacheva; Irina Dobriagina; Polina Polyanskikh; Veronika Korneva	Shared silver

== Air sports ==
Event	Gold	Silver	Bronze
Men's paragliding accuracy	Matjaž Ferarič; Slovenia	Tomáš Lednik; Czech Republic	Tanapat Luangiam; Thailand
Women's paragliding accuracy	Jolanta Romanenko; Lithuania	Nunnapat Phuchong; Thailand	Milica Marinković; Serbia
Open parachuting canopy piloting	Curt Bartholomew; United States	Tommy Dellibac; United States	Pablo Hernández; Spain

== Archery ==
Event	Gold	Silver	Bronze
Men's compound	Reo Wilde; United States	Pierre-Julien Deloche; France	Roberto Hernández; El Salvador
Men's field recurve	Jean-Charles Valladont; France	Brady Ellison; United States	Alan Wills; Great Britain
Men's field barebow	Giuseppe Seimandi; Italy	David García; Spain	Bobby Larsson; Sweden
Women's compound	Erika Jones; United States	Camilla Sømod; Denmark	Sara López; Colombia
Women's field recurve	Naomi Folkard; Great Britain	Elena Richter; Germany	Jessica Tomasi; Italy
Women's field barebow	Lina Björklund; Sweden	Andrea Raigel; Austria	Eleonora Strobbe; Italy
Mixed team compound	United States; Reo Wilde; Erika Jones	Italy; Sergio Pagni; Marcella Tonioli	Germany; Paul Titscher; Kristina Berger

== Artistic roller skating ==
Event	Gold	Silver	Bronze
Men's free skating	Marcel Stürmer; Brazil	Markus Lell; Germany	Andrea Aracu; Italy
Women's free skating	Debora Sbei; Italy	Lucija Mlinarič; Slovenia	Nataly Otálora; Colombia
Pairs	Italy; Danilo Decembrini; Sara Venerucci	Argentina; Javier Anzil; Florencia Moyano	Italy; Daniele Ragazzi; Giulia Merli
Dance	Italy; Alessandro Spigai; Anna Remondini	Italy; Filippo Lodi Forni; Elena Leoni	Colombia; Leonardo Parrado; Marcela Cruz

== Beach handball ==
Event	Gold	Silver	Bronze
Men	Brazil; Jaime Torres; Thiago Barcellos; Wellington Esteves; Nailson Amaral; Bruno Oliveira; Thiago Gusmão; Jarison Pereira; Danilo Eugênio; Gil Pires	Russia; Anton Zabolotskiy; Aleksey Pshenichniy; Evgeny Svestula; Nikolay Prokhorov; Vladimir Khmelkov; Vladimir Poletaev; Roman Kalashnikov; Anton Dache; Eduard Maksutov	Croatia; Hrvoje Horvat; Matej Semren; Ivan Dumenčić; Ivan Jurić; Zvonimir Đikić; Drago Vojnović; Mladen Paradžik; Valentino Valentaković; Igor Totić
Women	Brazil; Jerusa Dias; Nathalie Sena; Camila Souza; Millena Alencar; Patrícia Scheppa; Renata Santiago; Darlene Silva; Cinthya Piquet; Priscilla Annes	Hungary; Adrienn Zsigmond; Krisztina Sidó; Emese Tóth; Ágnes Győri; Kitti Gróz; Ágnes Hajdú; Bozsana Fekete; Fruzsina Kretz; Ágnes Kókai	Norway; Kjersti Beck; Rannveig Haugen; Kamilla Ersek; Cathrine Korvald; Martine Welfler; Elisabeth Hammerstad; Hege Bolstad; Iselin Ryvoll Klev; Tonje Klevstad

== Boules sports ==
Event	Gold	Silver	Bronze
Men's lyonnaise precision	Luigi Grattapaglia; Italy	Zhang Yixin; China	Thomas Allier; France
Men's lyonnaise progressive	Mauro Roggero; Italy	Guillaume Abelfo; France	Tomislav Kolobarić; Croatia
Men's pétanque doubles	France; Henri Lacroix; Dylan Rocher	Thailand; Thaloengkiat Phusa-at; Suksan Piachan	Belgium; Jean-François Hemon; Steven Ielegems
Men's raffa doubles	Italy; Andrea Cappellacci; Giuliano Di Nicola	Chile; Aldo Bavestrello; Rodolfo Gálvez	Argentina; Raúl Basualdo; Francisco Spessot
Women's lyonnaise precision	Iva Vlahek; Croatia	Gaëlle Millet; France	Romina Bolatti; Argentina
Women's lyonnaise progressive	Cheng Xiping; China	Barbara Barthet; France	Giorgia Rebora; Italy
Women's pétanque doubles	France; Ludivine D'Isidoro; Marie-Christine Virebayre	Thailand; Thongsri Thamakord; Phantipha Wongchuvej	Canada; Maryse Bergeron; Marieke Rolland
Women's raffa doubles	China; Cen Weifei; Zhang Wei	Argentina; Natalia Limardo; María Maíz	Brazil; Noeli Dalla Corte; Ingrid Schulz

== Bowling ==
Event	Gold	Silver	Bronze
Men's singles	Osku Palermaa; Finland	Mads Sandbækken; Norway	Hwang Dong-jun; South Korea
Women's singles	Daria Kovalova; Ukraine	Kelly Kulick; United States	Karen Marcano; Venezuela
Mixed doubles	United States; Mike Fagan; Kelly Kulick	Canada; Dan MacLelland; Lynne Gauthier	Mexico; Alejandro Cruz; Sandra Góngora

== Canoe polo ==
Event	Gold	Silver	Bronze
Men	Germany; Johan Driessen; Jakob Husen; Lukas Richter; Robin Heile; Robert Pest; Björn Zirotzki; Jonas Vieren; Harald Knoop; Sven Spenner	France; Thomas Bretenoux; Matthieu Lalliot; David Linet; Martin Brodoux; François Barbey; Patrice Belat; Maxime Gohier	Italy; Andrea Bertelloni; Giovanni Lodato; Davide Novara; Paolo Di Martino; Andrea Romano; Marco Porzio; Diego Pagano; Luca Bellini
Women	Germany; Caroline Sinsel; Alexandra Bonk; Antonia Scheidmann; Fabienne Thöle; Tonie Lenz; Stefanie Esser; Katharina Kruse; Elena Gilles	Great Britain; Aimee Robson; Pru Blyth; Ginny Coyles; Charlotte Lister; Chas Cheung; Kathryn Moffitt; Claire Mitchell	France; Gaëlle François; Jade Vassallo; Mélissa Ledormeur; Naïs Zanfini; Virginie Brackez; Valérie Sibioude; Mélanie Konig

== Cue sports ==
Event	Gold	Silver	Bronze
Men's three-cushion carom	Marco Zanetti; Italy	Eddy Merckx; Belgium	Glenn Hofman; Netherlands
Men's nine-ball pool	Darren Appleton; Great Britain	Chang Jung-lin; Chinese Taipei	Dennis Orcollo; Philippines
Men's snooker	Aditya Mehta; India	Liang Wenbo; China	Dechawat Poomjaeng; Thailand
Women's nine-ball pool	Chou Chieh-yu; Chinese Taipei	Kim Ga-young; South Korea	Kelly Fisher; Great Britain

== Dancesport ==
Event	Gold	Silver	Bronze
Standard	Germany; Benedetto Ferruggia; Claudia Köhler	Russia; Sergey Konovaltsev; Olga Konovaltseva	Italy; Rosario Guerra; Grazia Benincasa
Latin	Moldova; Gabriele Goffredo; Anna Matus	Russia; Timur Imametdinov; Ekaterina Nikolaeva	France; Charles-Guillaume Schmitt; Elena Salikhova
Salsa	Colombia; Jefferson Benjumea; Adriana Ávila	Czech Republic; Jakub Mazuch; Michaela Gatěková	Italy; Antonio Berardi; Jasmina Berardi

== Finswimming ==
Event	Gold	Silver	Bronze
Men's 100 m surface	Cesare Fumarola; Italy	Pavel Kabanov; Russia	Alexandre Noir; France
Men's 200 m surface	Max Lauschus; Germany	Stefano Figini; Italy	Dmitry Kokorev; Russia
Men's 400 m surface	Max Lauschus; Germany	Evgeny Smirnov; Russia	Stefano Figini; Italy
Men's 50 m apnoea	Kim Tae-kyun; South Korea	Pavel Kabanov; Russia	Mauricio Fernández; Colombia
Men's 4 × 100 m surface relay	Russia; Pavel Kabanov; Aleksey Kazantsev; Andrey Barabash; Dmitry Kokorev	Colombia; Juan Fernando Ocampo; Juan David Duque; Mauricio Fernández; Leonidas Romero	Ukraine; Dmytro Sydorenko; Oleksandr Konkov; Evgen Stepanchuk; Denys Grubnik
Women's 100 m surface	Lilla Székely; Hungary	Margaryta Artiushenko; Ukraine	Grace Fernández; Colombia
Women's 200 m surface	Valeriya Baranovskaya; Russia	Vasilisa Kravchuk; Russia	Yana Trofymez; Ukraine
Women's 400 m surface	Vasilisa Kravchuk; Russia	Yana Trofymez; Ukraine	Kim Bo-kyung; South Korea
Women's 50 m apnoea	Camille Heitz; France	Xu Huanshan; China	Margaryta Artiushenko; Ukraine
Women's 4 × 100 m surface relay	Russia; Vasilisa Kravchuk; Valeriya Baranovskaya; Elena Kononova; Vera Ilyushina	Ukraine; Anastasiia Antoniak; Olga Shlyakhovska; Yana Trofymez; Margaryta Artiushenko	China; Li Jing; Liang Yaoyue; Liu Jiao; Xu Yichuan

== Fistball ==
Event	Gold	Silver	Bronze
Men	Germany; Patrick Thomas; Fabian Sagstetter; Ajith Fernando; Lukas Schubert; Michael Marx; Christian Erlenmayer; Steve Schmutzler; Christian Kläner; Tim Albrecht	Switzerland; Cyrill Schreiber; Kevin Hagen; Ueli Rebsamen; Pascal Iseli; Fabian Marthy; Martin Dünner; Kevin Nützi; Romano Colombi; David Berger	Austria; Dietmar Weiß; Thomas Leitner; Béla Gschwandtner; Markus Ahrens; Michael Feichtenschlager; Klaus Thaller; Siegfried Simon; Stefan Winterleitner; Jean Andrioli

== Flying disc ==
Event	Gold	Silver	Bronze
Mixed ultimate	United States; George Stubbs; Alex Snyder; Cara Crouch; Sarah Griffith; Octavia Payne; Cree Howard; Ryan Farrell; Mike Natenberg; Georgia Bosscher; Ashlin Joye; Mac Taylor; Beau Kittredge; Dylan Tunnell	Australia; Gavin Moore; Tim Lavis; Lisi Moore; Jonno Holmes; Mish Phillips; Danielle Alexander; Peter Blakeley; Seb Barr; Cat Phillips; Stephanie Malcher; Tom Rogacki; Sarah Wentworth; Joel Pillar	Canada; Anne Mercier; Morgan Hibbert; Danielle Fortin; Nick Menzies; Candice Chan; Mira Donaldson; Jeff Lindquist; Caroline Cadotte; Andy Collins; Adrian Yearwood; Mark Lloyd; Catherine Hui; Cam Harris

== Inline hockey ==
Event	Gold	Silver	Bronze
Men	United States; Nick Maricic; Taylor Kane; Ian Rezac; Skyler Hoar; Stephen Campbell; Dustin Roux; Jamie Cooke; Mike Urbano; Josh Laricchia; Juaquin Chavira; Jose Cadiz; Itan Chavira; Travis Fudge; Brett Olinger	Italy; Claudio Mantese; Fabio Testa; Luca Rigoni; Patrik Frizzera; Davide Di Fabio; Enrico Dorigatti; Luca Roffo; Andrea Alberti; Stefano Antinori; Ingemar Gruber; Matteo Bellini; Matthias Eisenstecken; Denis Sommadossi; Michele Ciresa	Czech Republic; Jan Besser; David Balázs; Pavel Strýček; Michal Bezouška; Ladislav Vlček; David Sem; Martin Tvrzník; Michal Šimo; Ondřej Jirkův; Ondřej Fiedler; Daniel Brabec; Patrik Šebek; Petr Kafka; Lukáš Cik

== Inline speed skating ==
Event	Gold	Silver	Bronze
Men's 300 m time trial	Pedro Causil; Colombia	Andrés Felipe Muñoz; Colombia	Jang Su-chul; South Korea
Men's 500 m sprint	Andrea Angeletti; Italy	Lo Wei-lin; Chinese Taipei	Jang Su-chul; South Korea
Men's 1000 m sprint	Andrés Felipe Muñoz; Colombia	Bart Swings; Belgium	Pedro Causil; Colombia
Men's 10000 m points elimination	Bart Swings; Belgium	Chen Yan-cheng; Chinese Taipei	Felix Rijhnen; Germany
Men's 15000 m elimination	Peter Michael; New Zealand	Jorge Luis Cifuentes; Colombia	Chen Yan-cheng; Chinese Taipei
Women's 300 m time trial	Erika Zanetti; Italy	Paola Segura; Colombia	An Yi-seul; South Korea
Women's 500 m sprint	Jercy Puello; Colombia	Paola Segura; Colombia	Huang Yu-ting; Chinese Taipei
Women's 1000 m sprint	Huang Yu-ting; Chinese Taipei	Mareike Thum; Germany	Li Meng-chu; Chinese Taipei
Women's 10000 m points elimination	Guo Dan; China	Rommy Muñoz; Colombia	Yang Ho-chen; Chinese Taipei
Women's 15000 m elimination	Annette Heywood; United States	Guo Dan; China	Rommy Muñoz; Colombia

== Ju-jitsu ==
Event	Gold	Silver	Bronze
Men's duo	Germany; Dries Beyer; Raphael Rochner	Netherlands; Ruben Assmann; Marnix Bunnik	Spain; Enrique Sánchez; Alberto Yagüe
Men's fighting 62 kg	Pavel Korzhavykh; Russia	Farid Ben Ali; France	Wilson Álzate; Colombia
Men's fighting 69 kg	Mathias Willard; Denmark	Dmitry Beshenets; Russia	Sébastien Marty; France
Men's fighting 77 kg	Danny Mathiasen; Denmark	Ilya Borok; Russia	Johan de Gier; Netherlands
Men's fighting 85 kg	Ivan Nastenko; Ukraine	Masoud Jalilvand; Iran	Aleksey Ivanov; Russia
Men's fighting 94 kg	Lazar Kuburović; Denmark	Tomasz Szewczak; Poland	Mohsen Hamidi; Iran
Men's ne-waza 85 kg	Dan Schon; Mexico	Sébastien Lecocq; France	Roy Pariente; Israel
Women's duo	Austria; Mirnesa Bećirović; Mirneta Bećirović	Switzerland; Alexandra Erni; Antonia Erni	Sweden; Maria Eriksson; Malin Persson
Women's fighting 55 kg	Mandy Sonnemann; Germany	Martyna Bierońska; Poland	Anna Knutsen; Norway
Women's fighting 62 kg	Sara Widgren; Sweden	Séverine Nébié; France	Carina Neupert; Germany
Women's fighting 70 kg	Aleksandra Ivanova; Russia	Emilia Maćkowiak; Poland	Manuela Lukas; Germany
Women's ne-waza 70 kg	Anna Polok; Poland	Olga Usoltseva; Russia	Laura Boco; Italy
Mixed duo	Germany; Tom Ismer; Dominika Zagorski	Italy; Michele Vallieri; Sara Paganini	Netherlands; Ruben Assmann; Saskia Boomgaard

== Karate ==
Event	Gold	Silver	Bronze
Men's kata	Antonio Díaz; Venezuela	Ibrahim Magdy; Egypt	Ryo Kiyuna; Japan
Men's kumite 60 kg	Andrés Rendón; Colombia	Douglas Brose; Brazil	El-Mehdi Benrouida; Morocco
Men's kumite 67 kg	José Ramírez; Colombia	Magdy Mamdouh; Egypt	Tsuneari Yahiro; Australia
Men's kumite 75 kg	Rafael Aghayev; Azerbaijan	Noah Bitsch; Germany	Mohamed Abdelrahman; Egypt
Men's kumite 84 kg	Ryutaro Araga; Japan	Hany Shakr; Egypt	Georgios Tzanos; Greece
Men's kumite +84 kg	Jonathan Horne; Germany	Ángel Aponte; Venezuela	Shahin Atamov; Azerbaijan
Women's kata	Sandy Scordo; France	Nguyễn Hoàng Ngân; Vietnam	Sara Battaglia; Italy
Women's kumite 50 kg	Serap Özçelik; Turkey	Alexandra Recchia; France	Maria Alexiadis; Australia
Women's kumite 55 kg	Lucie Ignace; France	Jelena Kovačević; Croatia	Yassmin Hamdy; Egypt
Women's kumite 61 kg	Lina Gómez; Colombia	Jacqueline Factos; Ecuador	Olga Malofeeva; Russia
Women's kumite 68 kg	Kayo Someya; Japan	Ana Escandón; Colombia	Cheryl Murphy; United States
Women's kumite +68 kg	Ayumi Uekusa; Japan	Nadège Aït-Ibrahim; France	Isabel Aco; Peru

== Korfball ==
Event	Gold	Silver	Bronze
Mixed	Netherlands; Nadhie den Dunnen; Marjon Visser; Marjolijn Kroon; Rosemarie Roozenbeek; Rianne Echten; Celeste Split; Suzanne Struik; Barry Schep; Jos Roseboom; Rick Voorneveld; Tim Bakker; Mick Snel; Richard Kunst; Laurens Leeuwenhoek	Belgium; Nikki Schilders; Julie Caluwé; Annelies Vandenberghe; Gwenny De Plecker; Annick Dekeyser; Shiara Driesen; Patty Peeters; Jesse De Bremaeker; Mitch Lenaerts; Nick Janssens; Wim De Decker; David Peeters; Jeffrey Campers; Davor Duronjic; Jari Hardies	Chinese Taipei; Lin Ya-wen; Li Chou-ying; Chu Shu-ping; Chen Ping-fong; Huang Ying-hsuan; Lin Szu-yu; Chuan Ying-yen; Wu Chun-hsien; Chiu Chih-yi; Kung Hsing-jen; Huang Nien-hua; Chuang Hsiang-lin; Kao Chen-yu; Hung Kuan-ju; Pan Yu-liang

== Lifesaving ==
Event	Gold	Silver	Bronze
Men's 200 m obstacle	Niccolò Maschi; Italy	Federico Pinotti; Italy	Thomas Vilaceca; France
Men's 50 m manikin carry	Stefano Costamagna; Italy	Federico Pinotti; Italy	Armand Marais; South Africa
Men's 100 m manikin carry fins	Francesco Bonanni; Italy	Stefano Costamagna; Italy	Anil Sezen; Germany
Men's 100 m manikin tow fins	Marcel Hassemeier; Germany	Anil Sezen; Germany	Francesco Bonanni; Italy
Men's 200 m super lifesaver	Marcel Hassemeier; Germany	Federico Pinotti; Italy	Thomas Vilaceca; France
Men's 4 × 50 m obstacle relay	Germany; Christian Ertel; Adrian Flügel; Danny Wieck; Marcel Hassemeier	Italy; Federico Pinotti; Stefano Costamagna; Francesco Giordano; Francesco Bonanni	France; Marvin Maisonneuve; Jérémy Badré; Florian Laclaustra; Thomas Vilaceca
Men's 4 × 25 m manikin carry relay	Germany; Marcel Hassemeier; Christian Ertel; Anil Sezen; Danny Wieck	Italy; Federico Pinotti; Stefano Costamagna; Francesco Giordano; Francesco Bonanni	South Africa; Armand Marais; Barjo van Niekerk; Paul van Achterbergh; Dolfie Visser
Men's 4 × 50 m medley relay	France; Jérémy Badré; Pierre Caley; Marvin Maisonneuve; Florian Laclaustra	Germany; Christian Ertel; Anil Sezen; Marcel Hassemeier; Adrian Flügel; Danny Wieck	Italy; Federico Pinotti; Francesco Bonanni; Francesco Giordano; Stefano Costamagna
Women's 200 m obstacle	Silvia Meschiari; Italy	Zheng Rongrong; China	Magali Rousseau; France
Women's 50 m manikin carry	Magali Rousseau; France	Emmanuelle Bescheron; France	Bieke Vandenabeele; Belgium
Women's 100 m manikin carry fins	Marta Mozzanica; Italy	Anneloes Peulen; Netherlands	Marcella Prandi; Italy
Women's 100 m manikin tow fins	Justine Weyders; France	María Luengas; Spain	Maike op het Veld; Netherlands
Women's 200 m super lifesaver	Magali Rousseau; France	Chiara Pidello; Italy	Laura Pranzo; Italy
Women's 4 × 50 m obstacle relay	France; Margaux Fabre; Magali Rousseau; Justine Weyders; Emmanuelle Bescheron	China; Zheng Rongrong; Zhu Yiyun; Dai Xiaodie; Wu Chengying	Italy; Chiara Pidello; Silvia Meschiari; Laura Pranzo; Marcella Prandi
Women's 4 × 25 m manikin carry relay	Germany; Laura Ernicke; Anke Palm; Julia Schatz; Stephanie Kasperski	Belgium; Sofie Boogaerts; Bieke Vandenabeele; Laurence Lambot; Hannemie Peeters	Netherlands; Leone Kelleners; Ela Hutten; Maike op het Veld; Anneloes Peulen
Women's 4 × 50 m medley relay	France; Margaux Fabre; Justine Weyders; Emmanuelle Bescheron; Johanna Harel	Netherlands; Ela Hutten; Ilvy van Grimbergen; Anneloes Peulen; Maike op het Veld	Germany; Anke Palm; Laura Ernicke; Stephanie Kasperski; Aline Hundt

== Orienteering ==
Event	Gold	Silver	Bronze
Men's sprint	Matthias Kyburz; Switzerland	Andrey Khramov; Russia	Jerker Lysell; Sweden
Men's middle distance	Matthias Kyburz; Switzerland	Daniel Hubmann; Switzerland	Vilius Aleliūnas; Lithuania
Women's sprint	Annika Billstam; Sweden	Anne Margrethe Hausken; Norway	Maja Alm; Denmark
Women's middle distance	Minna Kauppi; Finland	Tove Alexandersson; Sweden	Nadiya Volynska; Ukraine
Mixed relay	Switzerland; Daniel Hubmann; Sara Lüscher; Matthias Kyburz; Judith Wyder	Denmark; Tue Lassen; Ida Bobach; Rasmus Thrane Hansen; Maja Alm	Austria; Gernot Kerschbaumer; Anna Nilsson Simkovics; Robert Merl; Ursula Kadan

== Powerlifting ==
Event	Gold	Silver	Bronze
Men's lightweight	Sergey Fedosienko; Russia	Sergey Gladkikh; Russia	Hsieh Tsung-ting; Chinese Taipei
Men's middleweight	Jarosław Olech; Poland	Kjell Egil Bakkelund; Norway	José Castillo; Ecuador
Men's heavyweight	Vadym Dovhanyuk; Ukraine	Anibal Coimbra; Luxembourg	Konstantin Lebedko; Russia
Men's super heavyweight	Andrey Konovalov; Russia	Viktor Testsov; Ukraine	Carl Yngvar Christensen; Norway
Women's lightweight	Natalia Salnikova; Russia	Chen Wei-ling; Chinese Taipei	Yukako Fukushima; Japan
Women's middleweight	Larysa Soloviova; Ukraine	Tetyana Akhmamyetyeva; Ukraine	Wu Hui-chun; Chinese Taipei
Women's heavyweight	Ana Castellain; Brazil	Yulia Medvedeva; Russia	Priscilla Ribic; United States
Women's super heavyweight	Olena Kozlova; Ukraine	Ielja Strik; Netherlands	Svetlana Tsvetkova; Russia

== Racquetball ==
Event	Gold	Silver	Bronze
Men's singles	Polo Gutiérrez; Mexico	Gilberto Mejía; Mexico	Rocky Carson; United States
Women's singles	Paola Longoria; Mexico	Cristina Amaya; Colombia	Rhonda Rajsich; United States

== Rhythmic gymnastics ==
Event	Gold	Silver	Bronze
Women's hoop	Hanna Rizatdinova; Ukraine	Melitina Staniouta; Belarus	Elizaveta Nazarenkova; Russia
Women's ball	Melitina Staniouta; Belarus	Hanna Rizatdinova; Ukraine	Alina Maksymenko; Ukraine
Women's clubs	Melitina Staniouta; Belarus	Hanna Rizatdinova; Ukraine	Alina Maksymenko; Ukraine

== Road speed skating ==
Event	Gold	Silver	Bronze
Men's 200 m time trial	Emmanuelle Silva; Chile	Andrés Felipe Muñoz; Colombia	Jorge Martínez; Mexico
Men's 500 m sprint	Pedro Causil; Colombia	Andrés Felipe Muñoz; Colombia	Andrea Angeletti; Italy
Men's 10000 m points	Liao Yen-sheng; Chinese Taipei	Jorge Luis Cifuentes; Colombia	Bart Swings; Belgium
Men's 20000 m elimination	Bart Swings; Belgium	Peter Michael; New Zealand	Jorge Bolaños; Ecuador
Women's 200 m time trial	María José Moya; Chile	Jercy Puello; Colombia	Erika Zanetti; Italy
Women's 500 m sprint	Erika Zanetti; Italy	Pamela Verdugo; Chile	Jana Gegner; Germany
Women's 10000 m points	Yang Ho-chen; Chinese Taipei	Rommy Muñoz; Colombia	Huang Yu-ting; Chinese Taipei
Women's 20000 m elimination	Guo Dan; China	Yang Ho-chen; Chinese Taipei	Rommy Muñoz; Colombia

== Rugby sevens ==
Event	Gold	Silver	Bronze
Men	South Africa; Bernado Botha; Werner Kok; Reuben Johannes; Jamba Ulengo; Cornal Hendricks; Kyle Brown; W. J. Strydom; Stephan Dippenaar; Ruwellyn Isbell; Mark Richards; Seabelo Senatla; Steven Hunt	Argentina; Tomás Lanfranconi; Martín Nuñez; Joaquín Paz; Axel Müller; Gastón Revol; Aníbal Panceyra; Ramiro Chávez; Tomás Carrió; Agustín Cortéz; Ramiro Finco; Diego Palma; Agustín Migliore	Canada; Jack Smith; Jordan Wilson-Ross; Jorden Sandover-Best; Connor Braid; Patrick Kay; Adam Kleeberger; Justin Douglas; Mike Scholz; Lucas Hammond; Clayton Meeres; Adam Zaruba; Jake Webster

== Sport climbing ==
Event	Gold	Silver	Bronze
Men's lead	Ramón Julián; Spain	Jakob Schubert; Austria	Magnus Midtbø; Norway
Men's speed	Dmitri Timofeev; Russia	Stanislav Kokorin; Russia	Zhong Qixin; China
Women's lead	Mina Markovič; Slovenia	Kim Ja-in; South Korea	Dinara Fakhritdinova; Russia
Women's speed	Alina Gaidamakina; Russia	Maria Krasavina; Russia	Iuliia Kaplina; Russia

== Squash ==
Event	Gold	Silver	Bronze
Men's singles	Grégory Gaultier; France	Simon Rösner; Germany	Miguel Ángel Rodríguez; Colombia
Women's singles	Nicol David; Malaysia	Natalie Grinham; Netherlands	Camille Serme; France

== Sumo ==
Event	Gold	Silver	Bronze
Men's 85 kg	Tatsuma Kawaguchi; Japan	Batyr Altyev; Russia	Rentsendorjiin Gantögs; Mongolia
Men's 115 kg	Oleksandr Gordienko; Ukraine	Atsamaz Kaziev; Russia	Ochirkhüügiin Ösökhbayar; Mongolia
Men's +115 kg	Alan Karaev; Russia	Vasily Margiev; Russia	Mutoshi Matsunaga; Japan
Men's openweight	Gankhuyagiin Naranbat; Mongolia	Yevhen Kozliatin; Ukraine	Vasily Margiev; Russia
Women's 65 kg	Yukina Iwamoto; Japan	Luciana Watanabe; Brazil	Vera Koval; Russia
Women's 80 kg	Maryna Pryshchepa; Ukraine	Maryna Maksymenko; Ukraine	Asano Matsuura; Japan
Women's +80 kg	Anna Zhigalova; Russia	Olesya Kovalenko; Russia	María Cedeño; Venezuela
Women's openweight	Anna Zhigalova; Russia	Janaína Silva; Brazil	Svitlana Iaromka; Ukraine

== Trampoline gymnastics ==
Event	Gold	Silver	Bronze
Men's synchro	China; Dong Dong; Tu Xiao	Russia; Nikita Fedorenko; Dmitry Ushakov	Denmark; Peter Jensen; Christian Andersen
Men's double mini	Bruno Martini; Brazil	Mikhail Zalomin; Russia	André Lico; Portugal
Men's tumbling	Zhang Luo; China	Shared gold	Kristof Willerton; Great Britain
Men's tumbling	Viktor Kyforenko; Ukraine	Shared gold	Kristof Willerton; Great Britain
Women's synchro	Great Britain; Amanda Parker; Kat Driscoll	Shared gold	Ukraine; Maryna Kyiko; Nataliia Moskvina
Women's synchro	China; Zhong Xingping; Li Dan	Shared gold	Ukraine; Maryna Kyiko; Nataliia Moskvina
Women's double mini	Svetlana Balandina; Russia	Corissa Boychuk; Canada	Sílvia Saiote; Portugal
Women's tumbling	Jia Fangfang; China	Rachael Letsche; Great Britain	Emily Smith; Canada

== Tug of war ==
Event	Gold	Silver	Bronze
Men's outdoor 640 kg	Switzerland; Vinzenz Arnold; Peter Erni; Beat Joller; Erich Joller; Fabian Langenstein; Christoph Rölli; Philipp Rölli; Beat Vonmoos; Ulrich Vonmoos	Great Britain; David Callcutt; Ian Daniels; David Field; David Gill; David Hammersley; Edward Holland; James Murphy; Steven Prime; Adrian Webb	Germany; Philipp Berl; Heinrich Biegert; Markus Böhler; Christian Diesslin; Daniel Fien; Stefan Heimann; Thomas Rother; Dirk Wagner
Men's outdoor 700 kg	Netherlands; Johannes Bartels; Gerrit Bijenhof; Robin Boerstoel; Wim Eggenkamp; Gerolph Hoff; Gerben Jansen; Gerbert Schutte; Gerrit Uilenreef; Vincent Wagenmans	Switzerland; Martin Arnold; Peter Erni; Beat Joller; Erich Joller; Fabian Langenstein; Christoph Rölli; Philipp Rölli; Ulrich Vonmoos	Sweden; Roger Andersson; Magnus Bengtsson; Daniel Enarsson; Torbjörn Haraldsson; Jim Johansson; Daniel Laven; Adrian Reinholdsson; Björn Törnblom; Henrik Törnblom
Women's indoor 540 kg	Chinese Taipei; Tanapima Amoszu; Cho Min-ling; Lee Wen-lin; Li Ju-chun; Lin Fang-ling; Shih Chao-yu; Teng Yu-chieh; Wang Jo-tsun; Yeh Jou-chen	Netherlands; Grietje Annema; Geri Boogaard; Simona de Vries; Aaltje Nieuwland; Carolina van der Helm; Irene van der Helm; Johanna van der Meijden; Jolanda Vergeer	South Africa; Kim Carstens; Kobie Phillips; Yolandi Rabe; Ané Ras; Claudia Rix; Leonell Steyn; Bea Terblanche; Kittie Terblanche

== Water skiing ==
Event	Gold	Silver	Bronze
Men's jump	Damien Sharman; Great Britain	Rodrigo Miranda; Chile	Igor Morozov; Russia
Men's slalom	Thomas Degasperi; Italy	Aaron Larkin; New Zealand	Johan Efverström; Sweden
Men's tricks	Aliaksei Zharnasek; Belarus	Nicholas Benatti; Italy	Jason McClintock; Canada
Men's wakeboarding	Andrew Adkison; United States	Toshiki Yasui; Japan	David O'Caoimh; Ireland
Women's jump	Regina Jaquess; United States	Marie Vympranietsova; Greece	Whitney McClintock; Canada
Women's slalom	Regina Jaquess; United States	Whitney McClintock; Canada	Claire-Lise Welter; France
Women's tricks	Clémentine Lucine; France	Erika Lang; United States	Michale Briant; Australia
Women's wakeboarding	Han Qiu; China	Charlotte Bryant; Great Britain	Larisa Morales; Mexico

== Invitational sports ==
=== Canoe marathon ===
Event	Gold	Silver	Bronze
Men's C-1	Yul Oeltze; Germany	Tamás Kiss; Hungary	Bartosz Dubiak; Poland
Men's C-2	Hungary; Márton Kövér; Attila Györe	Ukraine; Eduard Shemetylo; Oleksii Shpak	Portugal; Samuel Amorim; Rui Lacerda
Men's K-1	Máté Petrovics; Hungary	Alfredo Faria; Portugal	Joep van Bakel; Netherlands
Men's K-2	Hungary; Milán Noé; Bálint Noé	Czech Republic; Jiří Mládek; Tomáš Ježek	Germany; Maël Rengel; Benno Berberich
Women's K-1	Renáta Csay; Hungary	Vanda Kiszli; Hungary	Anna Alberti; Italy
Women's K-2	Hungary; Alexandra Bara; Renáta Csay	Italy; Stefania Cicali; Anna Alberti	France; Gwendoline Morel; Amélie Le Sclotour

=== Duathlon ===
Event	Gold	Silver	Bronze
Men's individual	Rob Woestenborghs; Belgium	Emilio Martín; Spain	Benoît Nicolas; France
Women's individual	Ai Ueda; Japan	Sandra Levenez; France	Jenny Schulz; Germany

=== Softball ===
Event	Gold	Silver	Bronze
Women	Cuba; Ludisleidis Nápoles; Lidibet Castelló; Anisleis López; Katia Coello; Lisbet García; Mailín Sánchez; Yusmelis Ocaña; Yanitza Avilés; Maritza Toledo; Yarisleidis Casanova; Yuselis Acosta; Yilian Rondón; Yilian Tornés; Diamela Puentes; Yusmari Pacheco; Minielli Heredia	Venezuela; Yuruby Alicart; Geraldine Puertas; Milagros Lozada; Alondra Pérez; Jocelin Díaz; Denisse Fuenmayor; Jineth Pimentel; Yaicey Sojo; Ana Coscorrosa; Hernanza Ruiz; María Soto; Yusmary Pérez; Anyibel Ramírez; María Gómez; Mayles Rodríguez; Miriam Jiménez	Colombia; Mayra Espitaleta; Vianys García; Olga Mazo; Jennifer García; Yanitza Mengual; Darlys Pérez; Mónica García; Alexis Camelo; Alysia Camelo; Erika Díaz; María Lambraño; Beatriz Cudriz; Kerling Guzmán; Libis Hurtado; Ibeth Pérez; Luz Pérez

=== Wushu ===
Event	Gold	Silver	Bronze
Men's changquan	Colvin Wang; United States	Ariel Mancilla; Chile	Luis Felipe Álvarez; Mexico
Men's nanquan & nangun	Farshad Arabi; Iran	Marcelo Yamada; Brazil	Takahiro Kawaguchi; Japan
Men's taijiquan & taijijian	Nguyễn Thanh Tùng; Vietnam	Lee Yang; Malaysia	Lu Rufei; China
Men's daoshu & gunshu	Zhu Leiming; China	Nguyễn Mạnh Quyền; Vietnam	Ng Say Yoke; Malaysia
Men's sanda 56 kg	Zhou Yongshan; China	Hüseyin Dündar; Turkey	None awarded
Men's sanda 65 kg	Mohsen Mohammadseifi; Iran	Pierre Moua; France	Savaş Bekar; Turkey
Men's sanda 75 kg	Javad Aghaei; Iran	Liu Qiang; China	None awarded
Men's sanda 85 kg	Hamid Reza Gholipour; Iran	Arslan Bektemirov; Russia	Dmytro Batok; Ukraine
Women's changquan	Gu Junxia; China	Andrea Hung; Canada	Natalia Sosa; Argentina
Women's nanquan & nandao	Chen Huiying; China	Tatiana Ivshina; Russia	Diana Bong; Malaysia
Women's taijiquan & taijijian	Lindswell Kwok; Indonesia	Ng Shin Yii; Malaysia	None awarded
Women's jianshu & qiangshu	Zheng Tianhui; Hong Kong	Dương Thúy Vi; Vietnam	Brenda Hatley; United States
Women's sanda 52 kg	Li Tingting; China	Manon Nardy; France	None awarded
Women's sanda 60 kg	Valérie Domergue; France	Pooja Kadian; India	None awarded
