= Powerlifting at the 2013 World Games =

- Venue: Mariano Ramos Coliseum
- Dates: 30 July–1 August 2013
- Competitors: 80 from 25 nations

The powerlifting competition at the 2013 World Games held in Cali, Colombia took place from July 30 to August 1 at the Mariano Ramos Coliseum.

== Participating nations ==
- Brazil (1)
- Canada (1)
- Chinese Taipei (5)
- Colombia (2)
- Czech Republic (1)
- Denmark (1)
- Ecuador (3)
- Finland (3)
- France (2)
- Great Britain (1)
- Germany (1)
- Hungary (1)
- Indonesia (2)
- Japan (2)
- Luxembourg (1)
- Netherlands (2)
- Norway (6)
- New Zealand (1)
- Poland (4)
- Puerto Rico (1)
- Russia (12)
- Sweden (1)
- Ukraine (14)
- United States (5)
- Venezuela (7)

== Medalists ==
Event	Gold	Silver	Bronze
Men's lightweight	Sergey Fedosienko; Russia	Sergey Gladkikh; Russia	Hsieh Tsung-ting; Chinese Taipei
Men's middleweight	Jarosław Olech; Poland	Kjell Egil Bakkelund; Norway	José Castillo; Ecuador
Men's heavyweight	Vadym Dovhanyuk; Ukraine	Anibal Coimbra; Luxembourg	Konstantin Lebedko; Russia
Men's super heavyweight	Andrey Konovalov; Russia	Viktor Testsov; Ukraine	Carl Yngvar Christensen; Norway
Women's lightweight	Natalia Salnikova; Russia	Chen Wei-ling; Chinese Taipei	Yukako Fukushima; Japan
Women's middleweight	Larysa Soloviova; Ukraine	Tetyana Akhmamyetyeva; Ukraine	Wu Hui-chun; Chinese Taipei
Women's heavyweight	Ana Rosa Castellain; Brazil	Yulia Medvedeva; Russia	Priscilla Ribic; United States
Women's super heavyweight	Olena Kozlova; Ukraine	Ielja Strik; Netherlands	Svetlana Tsvetkova; Russia

== Medals table ==
Rank	Nation	Gold	Silver	Bronze	Total
1	Russia	3	2	2	7
2	Ukraine	3	2	0	5
3	Brazil	1	0	0	1
3	Poland	1	0	0	1
5	Chinese Taipei	0	1	2	3
6	Norway	0	1	1	2
7	Luxembourg	0	1	0	1
7	Netherlands	0	1	0	1
9	Ecuador	0	0	1	1
9	Japan	0	0	1	1
9	United States	0	0	1	1
Totals (11 entries)		8	8	8	24
