= Sumo at the 2013 World Games =

- Venue: Mariano Ramos Coliseum
- Dates: 26–27 July 2013
- No. of events: 8
- Competitors: 96 from 17 nations

The sumo competition at the 2013 World Games took place from 26 to 27 July in Cali, Colombia at the Mariano Ramos Coliseum.

== Participating nations ==
- Argentina (4)
- Australia (1)
- Azerbaijan (1)
- Brazil (9)
- Bulgaria (1)
- Chinese Taipei (6)
- Egypt (3)
- Germany (1)
- Hungary (4)
- Japan (8)
- Mongolia (8)
- Netherlands (2)
- Poland (6)
- Russia (11)
- Ukraine (12)
- United States (13)
- Venezuela (6)

== Medal table ==
Rank	Nation	Gold	Silver	Bronze	Total
1	Russia	3	4	2	9
2	Ukraine	2	2	1	5
3	Japan	2	0	2	4
4	Mongolia	1	0	2	3
5	Brazil	0	2	0	2
6	Venezuela	0	0	1	1
Totals (6 entries)		8	8	8	24

=== Men ===
Event	Gold	Silver	Bronze
Lightweight	Tatsuma Kawaguchi; Japan	Batyr Altyev; Russia	Gantugs Rentsendorj; Mongolia
Middleweight (Note: In the men's middleweight event, István Kalmár (HUN) was stripped of his silver medal because of a positive doping test and the medals were reallocated.)	Oleksandr Gordienko; Ukraine	Atsamaz Kaziev; Russia	Usukhbayar Ochirkhuu; Mongolia
Heavyweight	Alan Karaev; Russia	Vasiliy Margiev; Russia	Mutoshi Matsunaga; Japan
Openweight	Naranbat Gankhuyag; Mongolia	Yevhen Kozliatin; Ukraine	Vasiliy Margiev; Russia

=== Women ===
Event	Gold	Silver	Bronze
Lightweight	Yukina Iwamoto; Japan	Luciana Watanabe; Brazil	Vera Koval; Russia
Middleweight	Maryna Pryshchepa; Ukraine	Maryna Maksymenko; Ukraine	Asano Matsuura; Japan
Heavyweight	Anna Zhigalova; Russia	Olesya Kovalenko; Russia	María Cedeño; Venezuela
Openweight	Anna Zhigalova; Russia	Janaína Silva; Brazil	Svitlana Iaromka; Ukraine
