= Finswimming at the 2013 World Games – Men's 50 m apnoea =

Finswimming – men's 50 m apnoea at the 2013 World Games
- Venue: Hernando Botero Swimming Pool, Cali, Colombia
- Date: 27 July 2013
- Competitors: 12 from 10 nations

Medalists
| gold medal | (South Korea) Kim Tae-kyun |
| silver medal | (Russia) Pavel Kabanov |
| bronze medal | (Colombia) Mauricio Fernandez Castillo |

The men's 50 m apnoea competition in finswimming at the 2013 World Games took place on 27 July 2013 at the Hernando Botero Swimming Pool in Cali, Colombia.

== Competition format ==
A total of 12 athletes entered the competition. The best eight athletes from preliminary round qualifies to the final.

== Results ==
=== Preliminary ===
| Rank | Athlete | Nation | Time | Note |
|---|---|---|---|---|
| 1 | Mauricio Fernandez Castillo | Colombia | 13.89 | Q WR |
| 2 | Pavel Kabanov | Russia | 14.13 | Q |
| 3 | Kim Tae-kyun | South Korea | 14.39 | Q |
| 4 | Li Hui | China | 14.64 | Q |
| 5 | Dmytro Sydorenko | Ukraine | 14.70 | Q |
| 6 | Aleksey Kazantsev | Russia | 14.75 | Q |
| 7 | Aleksander Drozdov | Estonia | 14.97 | Q |
| 8 | Cen Jinlong | China | 15.02 | Q |
| 9 | Jan Malkowski | Germany | 15.18 | |
| 10 | Lee Kwan-ho | South Korea | 15.23 | |
| 11 | Nikolai Tover | Estonia | 15.29 | |
| | Nicolas Cochou | France | DSQ | |

=== Final ===
| Rank | Athlete | Nation | Time |
|---|---|---|---|
| 1st place, gold medalist(s) | Kim Tae-kyun | South Korea | 14.01 |
| 2nd place, silver medalist(s) | Pavel Kabanov | Russia | 14.02 |
| 3rd place, bronze medalist(s) | Mauricio Fernandez Castillo | Colombia | 14.04 |
| 4 | Aleksey Kazantsev | Russia | 14.54 |
| 5 | Aleksander Drozdov | Estonia | 14.68 |
| 6 | Cen Jinlong | China | 14.75 |
| 7 | Dmytro Sydorenko | Ukraine | 14.80 |
| 8 | Li Hui | China | 14.82 |
