= Sport climbing at the 2013 World Games – Women's lead =

Sport climbing - Women's Lead at the 2013 World Games
- Venue: Velodrome Exterior, Cali, Colombia
- Dates: 4 August 2013
- Competitors: 18 from 10 nations

Medalists
gold medal	(Slovenia) Mina Markovič
silver medal	(South Korea) Kim Ja-in
bronze medal	(Russia) Dinara Fakhritdinova

The women's lead competition in sport climbing at the 2013 World Games took place on 4 August 2013 at the Velodrome Exterior in Cali, Colombia.

== Competition format ==
A total of 18 athletes entered the competition. Top 8 climbers from semifinal qualifies to the final.

== Results ==
=== Semifinal ===
Rank	Athlete	Nation	Height	Note
1	Dinara Fakhritdinova	Russia	Top	Q
1	Mina Markovič	Slovenia	Top	Q
3	Matilda Söderlund	Sweden	39+	Q
4	Charlotte Durif	France	35+	Q
5	Anna Eiter	Austria	34+	Q
5	Kim Ja-in	South Korea	34+	Q
7	Katharina Posch	Austria	33	Q
8	Magdalena Röck	Austria	32.5+	Q
9	Salomé Romain	France	32.5	
10	Helene Janicot	France	32+	
10	Evgenia Malamid	Russia	32+	
12	Johanna Ernst	Austria	26+	
13	Francis Rodriguez	Venezuela	25	
14	Cicada Jenerik	United States	24+	
15	Han Seu-ran	South Korea	23+	
16	Marcela Avellaneda	Colombia	22+	
17	Francis Guillen	Venezuela	21+	
18	Paola Vasquez Ordonez	Ecuador	18+	

=== Final ===
Rank	Athlete	Nation	Height
1st place, gold medalist(s)	Mina Markovič	Slovenia	49+
2nd place, silver medalist(s)	Kim Ja-in	South Korea	46+
3rd place, bronze medalist(s)	Dinara Fakhritdinova	Russia	42+
4	Charlotte Durif	France	41+
5	Magdalena Röck	Austria	41+
6	Matilda Söderlund	Sweden	34
7	Anna Eiter	Austria	31+
8	Katharina Posch	Austria	28+
