= Sport climbing at the 2013 World Games – Men's speed =

Sport climbing - Men's Speed at the 2013 World Games
- Venue: Velodrome Exterior, Cali, Colombia
- Dates: 3 August 2013
- Competitors: 18 from 8 nations

Medalists
gold medal	(Russia) Dmitrii Timofeev
silver medal	(Russia) Stanislav Kokorin
bronze medal	(China) Zhong Qixin

The men's speed competition in sport climbing at the 2013 World Games took place on 3 August 2013 at the Velodrome Exterior in Cali, Colombia.

== Competition format ==
A total of 18 athletes entered the competition. In qualification every athlete has 2 runs, best time counts. Top 8 climbers qualify to main competition.

== Results ==
=== Qualifications ===
Rank	Athlete	Nation	Time 1	Time 2	Best of	Note
1	Danylo Boldyrev	Ukraine	6.17	6.28	6.17	Q
2	Zhong Qixin	China	6.22	6.31	6.22	Q
3	Libor Hroza	Czech Republic	6.29	6.45	6.29	Q
4	Stanislav Kokorin	Russia	6.37	7.91	6.37	Q
5	Evgenii Vaitcekhovskii	Russia	6.39	7.04	6.39	Q
6	Dmitrii Timofeev	Russia	6.43	7.11	6.43	Q
7	Nikita Suyushkin	Russia	6.84	6.60	6.60	Q
8	Volodymyr Zinchenko	Ukraine	7.00	6.69	6.69	Q
9	Sergei Sinitcyn	Russia	8.05	6.80	6.80	
10	Josmar Nieves	Venezuela	7.01	6.86	6.86	
11	Erik Noya	Venezuela	7.64	6.91	6.91	
12	Sufriyanto Rindi	Indonesia	6.97	7.28	6.97	
13	Ruslan Faizullin	Russia	7.17	7.00	7.00	
14	Leonel de Las Salas	Venezuela	7.46	7.12	7.12	
15	Li Guangdong	China	7.20	7.42	7.20	
16	Joshua Chagai Levin	United States	8.10	7.49	7.49	
17	Yaroslav Gontaryk	Ukraine	DNF	7.94	7.94	
18	Jorge Hernandez	Colombia	9.14	9.50	9.14	

=== Competition bracket ===
Quarter-finals
1	(Ukraine) Danylo Boldyrev	6.24
8	(Ukraine) Volodymyr Zinchenko	6.94
4	(Russia) Stanislav Kokorin	6.11
5	(Russia) Evgenii Vaitcekhovskii	8.37
2	(China) Zhong Qixin	6.30
7	(Russia) Nikita Suyushkin	8.36
3	(Czech Republic) Libor Hroza	6.22
6	(Russia) Dmitrii Timofeev	6.12

Semi-finals
1	(Ukraine) Danylo Boldyrev	5.98
4	(Russia) Stanislav Kokorin	5.95
2	(China) Zhong Qixin	7.86
6	(Russia) Dmitrii Timofeev	6.14

Finals
4	(Russia) Stanislav Kokorin	6.73
6	(Russia) Dmitrii Timofeev	6.27
Third place
1	(Ukraine) Danylo Boldyrev	6.34
2	(China) Zhong Qixin	6.06
