= Sport climbing at the 2013 World Games – Women's speed =

Sport climbing - Women's Speed at the 2013 World Games
- Venue: Velodrome Exterior, Cali, Colombia
- Dates: 3 August 2013
- Competitors: 17 from 7 nations

Medalists
gold medal	(Russia) Alina Gaidamakina
silver medal	(Russia) Mariia Krasavina
bronze medal	(Russia) Iuliia Kaplina

The women's speed competition in sport climbing at the 2013 World Games took place on 3 August 2013 at the Velodrome Exterior in Cali, Colombia.

== Competition format ==
A total of 17 athletes entered the competition. In qualification every athlete has 2 runs, best time counts. Top 8 climbers qualify to main competition.

== Results ==
=== Qualifications ===
Rank	Athlete	Nation	Time 1	Time 2	Best of	Note
1	Alina Gaidamakina	Russia	8.15	8.33	8.15	Q
2	Mariia Krasavina	Russia	8.56	8.46	8.46	Q
3	Iuliia Kaplina	Russia	8.64	8.48	8.48	Q
4	Aleksandra Rudzińska	Poland	8.49	8.70	8.49	Q
5	Yuliya Levochkina	Russia	8.63	10.19	8.63	Q
6	Anouck Jaubert	France	8.86	8.86	8.86	Q
7	Esther Bruckner	France	9.00	8.88	8.88	Q
8	Klaudia Buczek	Poland	10.44	9.10	9.10	Q
9	Monika Prokopiuk	Poland	9.41	9.61	9.41	
10	Lucelia Blanco	Venezuela	9.98	10.54	9.98	
11	Anna Emets	Russia	10.57	10.54	10.54	
12	Edyta Ropek	Poland	11.03	11.62	11.03	
13	Francis Guillen	Venezuela	12.06	11.10	11.10	
14	Margarita Robles	Colombia	15.04	12.94	12.94	
15	Alison Stewart-Patterson	Canada	13.19	12.96	12.96	
15	Natalia Titova	Russia	14.34	12.96	12.96	
17	Paola Vasquez Ordonez	Ecuador	17.60	16.38	16.38	

=== Competition bracket ===
Quarter-finals
1	(Russia) Alina Gaidamakina	8.21
8	(Poland) Klaudia Buczek	8.71
4	(Poland) Aleksandra Rudzińska	8.55
5	(Russia) Yuliya Levochkina	8.75
2	(Russia) Mariia Krasavina	8.64
7	(France) Esther Bruckner	9.43
3	(Russia) Iuliia Kaplina	8.22
6	(France) Anouck Jaubert	8.64

Semi-finals
1	(Russia) Alina Gaidamakina	8.06
4	(Poland) Aleksandra Rudzińska	DNF
2	(Russia) Mariia Krasavina	8.56
3	(Russia) Iuliia Kaplina	DNF

Finals
1	(Russia) Alina Gaidamakina	8.12
2	(Russia) Mariia Krasavina	8.20
Third place
4	(Poland) Aleksandra Rudzińska	9.31
3	(Russia) Iuliia Kaplina	9.19
