= Ju-jitsu at the 2013 World Games – Men's fighting 62 kg =

Men's fighting 62 kg at the 2013 World Games
- Venue: Evagelista Mora Coliseum
- Date: 30 July 2013
- Competitors: 6 from 6 nations

Medalists
| 1st place, gold medalist(s) | | (Russia) Pavel Korzhavykh |
| 2nd place, silver medalist(s) | | (France) Farid Ben Ali |
| 3rd place, bronze medalist(s) | | (Colombia) Wilson Álzate |

The men's fighting 62 kg competition in ju-jitsu at the 2013 World Games took place on 30 July 2013 at the Evagelista Mora Coliseum in Cali, Colombia.

== Competition format ==
A total of six athletes was on the start list of this event. Five of them entered the competition. They fought in round-robin system and athlete with the most points was a winner.

== Results ==
| Rank | Athlete | B | W | L | Pts | +/– |
|---|---|---|---|---|---|---|
| 1st place, gold medalist(s) | Pavel Korzhavykh (RUS) | 4 | 3 | 1 | 144–25 | +119 |
| 2nd place, silver medalist(s) | Farid Ben Ali (FRA) | 4 | 3 | 1 | 127–38 | +89 |
| 3rd place, bronze medalist(s) | Wilson Álzate (COL) | 4 | 2 | 2 | 70–73 | –3 |
| 4 | Yazid Dalaa (BEL) | 4 | 2 | 2 | 71–76 | –5 |
| 5 | Adrián Cortés (MEX) | 4 | 0 | 4 | 0–200 | –200 |
| 6 | Ellaz Mammadov (AZE) | DNS | | | | |

| | Score | |
|---|---|---|
| Farid Ben Ali (FRA) | 11–32 | Pavel Korzhavykh (RUS) |
| Adrián Cortés (MEX) | 0–50 | Wilson Álzate (COL) |
| Farid Ben Ali (FRA) | 50–0 | Adrián Cortés (MEX) |
| Wilson Álzate (COL) | 14–7 | Yazid Dalaa (BEL) |
| Farid Ben Ali (FRA) | 16–6 | Wilson Álzate (COL) |
| Pavel Korzhavykh (RUS) | 12–14 | Yazid Dalaa (BEL) |
| Farid Ben Ali (FRA) | 50–0 | Yazid Dalaa (BEL) |
| Pavel Korzhavykh (RUS) | 50–0 | Adrián Cortés (MEX) |
| Pavel Korzhavykh (RUS) | 50–0 | Wilson Álzate (COL) |
| Adrián Cortés (MEX) | 0–50 | Yazid Dalaa (BEL) |
