= Ukraine at the 2013 World Games =

Ukraine at the World Games 2013
- IOC code: UKR
- NOC: National Olympic Committee of Ukraine

in Cali, Colombia 25 July 2013 – 4 August 2013
- Medals Ranked 7th: Gold 9 Silver 10 Bronze 9 Total 28

World Games appearances (overview)
- 1993; 1997; 2001; 2005; 2009; 2013; 2017; 2022; 2025

Ukraine competed at the 2013 World Games in Cali, Colombia, from 25 July 2013 to 4 August 2013. Ukraine qualified a team in men's beach handball. The team did not compete in squash.

== Medalists ==
=== Main programme ===
| Medal | Name | Sport | Event |
|---|---|---|---|
| Gold | Daria Kovalova | Bowling | Women's tenpin singles |
| Gold | Ivan Nastenko | Ju-jitsu | Men's fighting 85 kg |
| Gold | Vadym Dovhanyuk | Powerlifting | Men's heavyweight |
| Gold | Larysa Soloviova | Powerlifting | Women's middleweight |
| Gold | Olena Kozlova | Powerlifting | Women's super heavyweight |
| Gold | Hanna Rizatdinova | Rhythmic gymnastics | Women's hoop |
| Gold | Oleksandr Hordiienko | Sumo | Men's middleweight |
| Gold | Maryna Pryshchepa | Sumo | Women's middleweight |
| Gold | Viktor Kyforenko | Trampoline | Men's tumbling |
| Silver | Anastasiya Melnychenko; Kateryna Sytnikova | Acrobatic gymnastics | Women's pair |
| Silver | Margarita Artiushenko | Finswimming | Women's 100 m surface |
| Silver | Yana Trofymez | Finswimming | Women's 400 m surface |
| Silver | Anastasiia Antoniak; Olga Shlyakhovska; Yana Trofymez; Margarita Artiushenko | Finswimming | Women's 4 x 100 m surface relay |
| Silver | Viktor Testsov | Powerlifting | Men's super heavyweight |
| Silver | Tetyana Akhmamyetyeva | Powerlifting | Women's middleweight |
| Silver | Hanna Rizatdinova | Rhythmic gymnastics | Women's ball |
| Silver | Hanna Rizatdinova | Rhythmic gymnastics | Women's clubs |
| Silver | Yevhen Kozliatin | Sumo | Men's Open weight |
| Silver | Maryna Maksymenko | Sumo | Women's middleweight |
| Bronze | Viktor Iaremchuk; Andrii Kozynko; Oleksii Lesyk; Oleksandr Nelep | Acrobatic gymnastics | Men's group |
| Bronze | Margarita Artiushenko | Finswimming | Women's 50 m apnoe |
| Bronze | Yana Trofymez | Finswimming | Women's 200 m surface |
| Bronze | Dmytro Sydorenko; Oleksandr Konkov; Evgen Stepanchuk; Denys Grubnik | Finswimming | Men's 4 x 100 m surface relay |
| Bronze | Nadiya Volynska | Orienteering | Women's middle distance |
| Bronze | Alina Maksymenko | Rhythmic gymnastics | Women's ball |
| Bronze | Alina Maksymenko | Rhythmic gymnastics | Women's clubs |
| Bronze | Svitlana Yaromka | Sumo | Women's Open weight |
| Bronze | Maryna Kyiko; Nataliia Moskvina | Trampoline | Women's synchronized |

=== Invitational sports ===
| Medal | Name | Sport | Event |
|---|---|---|---|
| Silver | Eduard Shemetylo; Oleksii Shpak | Canoe marathon | Men's C-2 |
| Bronze | Dmytro Batok | Wushu | Men's sanda 85 kg |

== Canoe marathon ==
Ukraine competed in men's canoe only.

| Athlete | Event | Semifinal | | Final | |
| Athlete | Event | Result | Rank | Result | Rank |
|---|---|---|---|---|---|
| Ihor Prysiazhniuk | Men's C-1 | — | | 54:38.589 | 8 |
| Eduard Shemetylo | Men's C-1 | — | | DNS | |
| Eduard Shemetylo; Oleksii Shpak | Men's C-2 | — | | 1:06:30.959 | 2nd place, silver medalist(s) |

== Ju-jitsu ==
Men

| Athlete | Event | Group stage | | | Semifinals | Final/Bronze medal bout | |
| Athlete | Event | Opposition Result | Opposition Result | Rank | Opposition Result | Opposition Result | Rank |
|---|---|---|---|---|---|---|---|
| Ivan Nastenko | 85 kg | Jalilvand (IRI); L 6–9 | Vringer (NED); W 24–9 | 2 Q | Ivanov (RUS); W 19–14 | Jalilvand (IRI); W 11–8 | 1st place, gold medalist(s) |

== Karate ==
Ukraine was represented by one athlete. The country did not compete in this sport at the 2001, 2005, and 2009 Games.

Women

| Athlete | Event | Group stage | | | | Semifinals | Final/Bronze medal bout | |
| Athlete | Event | Opposition Result | Opposition Result | Opposition Result | Rank | Opposition Result | Opposition Result | Rank |
|---|---|---|---|---|---|---|---|---|
| Anita Serogina | 61 kg | Gómez (COL); D 2–2 | Mahmoud (EGY); L 0–3 | Factos (ECU); L 3–4 | 4 | Did not advance | | |

== Wushu ==
Ukraine debuted in the sport.

Sanda

| Athlete | Event | Semifinals | Final/Bronze medal bout | |
| Athlete | Event | Opposition Result | Opposition Result | Rank |
|---|---|---|---|---|
| Dmytro Batok | 85 kg | Gholipour (IRI); L 0–2 | Did not advance | 3rd place, bronze medalist(s) |
