= Ju-jitsu at the 2013 World Games – Men's fighting 85 kg =

Men's fighting 85 kg at the 2013 World Games
- Venue: Evagelista Mora Coliseum
- Date: 29 July 2013
- Competitors: 6 from 6 nations

Medalists
1st place, gold medalist(s)		(Ukraine) Ivan Nastenko
2nd place, silver medalist(s)		(Iran) Masoud Jalilvand
3rd place, bronze medalist(s)		(Russia) Aleksey Ivanov

The men's fighting 85 kg competition in ju-jitsu at the 2013 World Games took place on 29 July 2013 at the Evagelista Mora Coliseum in Cali, Colombia.

== Results ==
=== Elimination round ===
==== Group A ====
Rank	Athlete	B	W	L	Pts	Score
1	Tomasz Krajewski (POL)	2	2	0	61–7	+54
2	Aleksey Ivanov (RUS)	2	1	1	57–11	+46
3	Edwin Cabezas Mondragón (COL)	2	0	2	0–100	–100

	Score	
Aleksey Ivanov (RUS)	50–0	Edwin Cabezas Mondragón (COL)
Aleksey Ivanov (RUS)	7–11	Tomasz Krajewski (POL)
Edwin Cabezas Mondragón (COL)	0–50	Tomasz Krajewski (POL)

==== Group B ====
Rank	Athlete	B	W	L	Pts	Score
1	Ivan Nastenko (UKR)	2	1	1	30–18	+12
2	Masoud Jalilvand (IRI)	2	1	1	15–12	+3
3	Wout Vringer (NED)	2	1	1	15–30	–15

	Score	
Ivan Nastenko (UKR)	6–9	Masoud Jalilvand (IRI)
Ivan Nastenko (UKR)	24–9	Wout Vringer (NED)
Masoud Jalilvand (IRI)	6–6	Wout Vringer (NED)

=== Finals ===
Semifinals
Tomasz Krajewski (POL)	4
Masoud Jalilvand (IRI)	11
Ivan Nastenko (UKR)	19
Aleksey Ivanov (RUS)	14

Final
Masoud Jalilvand (IRI)	8
Ivan Nastenko (UKR)	11
Third place
Tomasz Krajewski (POL)	0
Aleksey Ivanov (RUS)	50
