= Powerlifting at the World Games =

Sport of powerlifting

Powerlifting has been part of every World Games since the inaugural 1981 World Games held in Santa Clara, California.

== Medalists ==
=== Men ===
==== Lightweight ====
Games	Gold	Silver	Bronze
1985 London	Hiroyuki Isagawa (JPN)	Dave Mannering (GBR)	Eddie Pengelly (GBR)
1989 Karlsruhe	Ventje Male (INA)	Hiroyuki Isagawa (JPN)	Nanda Telambanua (INA)
1993 The Hague	Gerard McNamara (IRL)	Rodney Hypolite (GBR)	Sergey Zhuravliev (RUS)
1997 Lahti	Alexey Sivokon (KAZ)	Sutrisno Bin Darimin (INA)	Hu Chun-hsiung (TPE)
2001 Akita	Alexey Sivokon (KAZ)	Konstantin Pavlov (RUS)	Mikail Andruchin (RUS)
2005 Duisburg	Ravil Kazakov (RUS)	Hsieh Tsung-ting (TPE)	Dariusz Wszoła (POL)
2009 Kaohsiung	Hsieh Tsung-ting (TPE)	Arkadiy Shalokha (UKR)	Hassan El Belghiti (FRA)
2013 Cali	Sergey Fedosienko (RUS)	Sergey Gladkikh (RUS)	Hsieh Tsung-ting (TPE)
2017 Wroclaw	Sergey Fedosienko (RUS)	Hassan El Belghiti (FRA)	Charles Okpoko (USA)
2022 Birmingham	Yusuke Satake (JPN)	Hsieh Tsung-ting (TPE)	Hassan El Belghiti (FRA)

==== Middleweight ====
Games	Gold	Silver	Bronze
1985 London	Claudino Ardini (ITA)	Eddie Coppin (BEL)	Glen Waszkiel (AUS)
1989 Karlsruhe	Alexander Ausby (USA)	Floriano Domenici (ITA)	Michael Barber (USA)
1993 The Hague	Frank Schramm (GER)	His Yi-ching (TPE)	Walt Forsey (CAN)
1997 Lahti	Triharyanto (INA)	Dmitriy Soloviov (UKR)	Jan Wilczynski (POL)
2001 Akita	Viktor Furazhkin (RUS)	Andrey Tarasenko (RUS)	Sergey Mor (RUS)
2005 Duisburg	Andrey Tarasenko (RUS)	Viktor Furazhkin (RUS)	Jan Wegiera (POL)
2009 Kaohsiung	Jaroslaw Olech (POL)	Andriy Naniev (UKR)	Jan Wegiera (POL)
2013 Cali	Jaroslaw Olech (POL)	Kjell Egil Bakkelund (NOR)	José Castillo (ECU)
2017 Wroclaw	Jaroslaw Olech (POL)	Volodymyr Rysiyev (UKR)	Andriy Naniev (UKR)
2022 Birmingham	Kjell Egil Bakkelund (NOR)	Mykola Barannik (UKR)	Paul Knute Douglas (ISV)

==== Heavyweight ====
Games	Gold	Silver	Bronze
1985 London	Tony Stevens (GBR)	Dave Caldwell (GBR)	John Neighbour (GBR)
1989 Karlsruhe	Tony Stevens (GBR)	Johnny Melander (SWE)	Jean-Pierre Brulois (FRA)
1993 The Hague	Gene Bell (USA)	Viktor Naleikin (UKR)	Brian Reynolds (GBR)
1997 Lahti	Sturla Davidsen (NOR)	Carl Christoffersen (NOR)	Janne Toivanen (FIN)
2001 Akita	Daisuke Midote (JPN)	Brad Gillingham (USA)	Jörgen Ljungberg (SWE)
2005 Duisburg	Nikolay Suslov (RUS)	Brian Siders (USA)	Ivan Freydun (UKR)
2009 Kaohsiung	Sergiy Pevnev (UKR)	Jacek Wiak (POL)	Anibal Coimbra (LUX)
2013 Cali	Vadym Dovhanyuk (UKR)	Anibal Coimbra (LUX)	Konstantin Lebedko (RUS)
2017 Wroclaw	Sergii Bilyi (UKR)	Dmitry Inzarkin (RUS)	Dmitry Semenenko (UKR)
2022 Birmingham	Volodymyr Rysiyev (UKR)	Ian Bell (ISV)	Danylo Kovalov (UKR)

==== Super Heavyweight ====
Games	Gold	Silver	Bronze
2009 Kaohsiung	Michael Tuchscherer (USA)	Oleksandr Shepel (UKR)	Valeriy Karpov (UKR)
2013 Cali	Andrey Konovalov (RUS)	Viktor Testsov (UKR)	Carl Yngvar Christensen (NOR)
2017 Wroclaw	Oleksii Rokochiy (UKR)	Joseph Cappellino (USA)	Nurlan Yeshmakhanov (KAZ)
2022 Birmingham	Oleksiy Bychkov (UKR)	Sen Yang (TPE)	Tony Cliffe (GBR)

==== −52 kg ====
Games	Gold	Silver	Bronze
1981 Santa Clara	Hideaki Inabe (JPN)	Don MacVicar (USA)	

==== −56 kg ====
Games	Gold	Silver	Bronze
1981 Santa Clara	Gary Hunnicut (USA)		

==== −60 kg ====
Games	Gold	Silver	Bronze
1981 Santa Clara	Ito Chokichi (JPN)	George Hummel (USA)	Mark Shijo (USA)

==== −75 kg ====
Games	Gold	Silver	Bronze
1981 Santa Clara	Mauro Di Pasquale (CAN)	Ray Neeley (USA)	

==== −82,5 kg ====
Games	Gold	Silver	Bronze
1981 Santa Clara	Jim Grudzien (USA)	Dennis Wright (USA)	

==== −90 kg ====
Games	Gold	Silver	Bronze
1981 Santa Clara	Walter Thomas (USA)	Jen Len (USA)	

==== −100 kg ====
Games	Gold	Silver	Bronze
1981 Santa Clara	Jim Cash (USA)	Frederick Hatfield (USA)	

==== −110 kg ====
Games	Gold	Silver	Bronze
1981 Santa Clara	Scott Palmer (USA)	Gene Kunit (USA)	

==== +110 kg ====
Games	Gold	Silver	Bronze
1981 Santa Clara	Doyle Kennedy (USA)	Dave Shaw (USA)	

=== Women ===
==== Lightweight ====
Games	Gold	Silver	Bronze
1989 Karlsruhe	Anna-Liisa Prinkkala (FIN)	Hisako Yoshida (JPN)	Rekha Mal (IND)
1993 The Hague	Claudine Cognacq (DEN)	Raija Koskinen (FIN)	Gema Christobal (ESP)
1997 Lahti	Lin Li-min (TPE)	Raija Koskinen (FIN)	Nadezhda Mir (KAZ)
2001 Akita	Raija Koskinen (FIN)	Chen Kuan-ting (TPE)	Yukako Fukushima (JPN)
2005 Duisburg	Olesya Lafina (RUS)	Olena Dmytruk (UKR)	Chen Wei-ling (TPE)
2009 Kaohsiung	Chen Wei-ling (TPE)	Yukako Fukushima (JPN)	Sri Hartati (INA)
2013 Cali	Natalia Salnikova (RUS)	Chen Wei-ling (TPE)	Yukako Fukushima (JPN)
2017 Wroclaw	Natalia Salnikova (RUS)	Yukako Fukushima (JPN)	Chen Wei-ling (TPE)
2022 Birmingham	Yukako Fukushima (JPN)	Zuzanna Kula (POL)	Anastasiya Derevyanko (UKR)

==== Middleweight ====
Games	Gold	Silver	Bronze
1989 Karlsruhe	Joy Burt (CAN)	Silvana Bollmann (GER)	Jenny Hunter (GBR)
1993 The Hague	Carrie Boudreau (USA)	Beate Amdahl (NOR)	Ingeborg Marx (BEL)
1997 Lahti	Carrie Boudreau (USA)	Ingeborg Marx (BEL)	Irene Frangi (ARG)
2001 Akita	Marina Kudinova (RUS)	Irina Abramova (RUS)	Pirjo Savola (FIN)
2005 Duisburg	Larysa Vitsiyevska (UKR)	Priscilla Ribic (USA)	Nadezhda Malyugina (UZB)
2009 Kaohsiung	Noviana Sari (INA)	Tetyana Prymenchuk (UKR)	Zhanna Ivanova (UKR)
2013 Cali	Larysa Soloviova (UKR)	Tetyana Akhmamyetyeva (UKR)	Wu Hui-chun (TPE)
2017 Wroclaw	Larysa Soloviova (UKR)	Anna Ryzhkova (RUS)	Wu Hui-chun (TPE)
2022 Birmingham	Carola Galla (ITA)	Taylor Lachapelle (ISV)	Larysa Soloviova (UKR)

==== Heavyweight ====
Games	Gold	Silver	Bronze
1989 Karlsruhe	Liz Odendaal (NED)	Sumita Laha (IND)	Judy Oakes (GBR)
1993 The Hague	Cathy Millen (NZL)	Tammy Diande (USA)	Shelby Corson (USA)
1997 Lahti	Lisa Sjöstrand (SWE)	Lee Chia-sui (TPE)	Chao Chen-yeh (TPE)
2001 Akita	Svetlana Miklashevich (RUS)	Natalia Payusova (RUS)	Chao Chen-yeh (TPE)
2005 Duisburg	Marina Kudinova (UKR)	Galina Karpova (RUS)	Irina Yavorska (UKR)
2009 Kaohsiung	Larysa Soloviova (UKR)	Antonietta Orsini (ITA)	Priscilla Ribic (USA)
2013 Cali	Ana Castellain (BRA)	Yulia Medvedeva (RUS)	Priscilla Ribic (USA)
2017 Wroclaw	Ana Castellain (BRA)	Priscilla Ribic (USA)	Yenifer Canelon (VEN)
2022 Birmingham	Agata Sitko (POL)	Kelsey McCarthy (ISV)	Francesca Parrello (ITA)

==== Super Heavyweight ====
Games	Gold	Silver	Bronze
2009 Kaohsiung	Iryna Yavorska-Karpova (UKR)	Jessica O'Donnell (USA)	Chang Ya-wen (TPE)
2013 Cali	Olena Kozlova (UKR)	Ielja Strik (NED)	Svetlana Tcvetkova (RUS)
2017 Wroclaw	Bonica Lough (USA)	Tetyana Melnyk (UKR)	Liane Blyn (USA)
2022 Birmingham	Rhaea Stinn (CAN)	Bonica Brown (USA)	Tetyana Melnyk (UKR)
