= Karate at the 2013 World Games =

The karate competition at the 2013 World Games held in Cali, Colombia took place from July 26 to July 27.

== Participating nations ==
- Australia
- Azerbaijan
- Brazil
- Colombia
- Ecuador
- Egypt
- France
- Germany
- Greece
- Italy
- Japan
- Morocco
- Peru
- Russia
- United States
- Venezuela
- Vietnam

== Medalists ==
Event	Gold	Silver	Bronze
Men's kata	Antonio Díaz; Venezuela	Ibrahim Magdy; Egypt	Ryo Kiyuna; Japan
Men's kumite 60 kg	Andrés Rendón; Colombia	Douglas Brose; Brazil	El-Mehdi Benrouida; Morocco
Men's kumite 67 kg	José Ramírez; Colombia	Magdy Mamdouh; Egypt	Tsuneari Yahiro; Australia
Men's kumite 75 kg	Rafael Aghayev; Azerbaijan	Noah Bitsch; Germany	Mohamed Abdelrahman; Egypt
Men's kumite 84 kg	Ryutaro Araga; Japan	Hany Shakr; Egypt	Georgios Tzanos; Greece
Men's kumite +84 kg	Jonathan Horne; Germany	Ángel Aponte; Venezuela	Shahin Atamov; Azerbaijan
Women's kata	Sandy Scordo; France	Nguyễn Hoàng Ngân; Vietnam	Sara Battaglia; Italy
Women's kumite 50 kg	Serap Özçelik; Turkey	Alexandra Recchia; France	Maria Alexiadis; Australia
Women's kumite 55 kg	Lucie Ignace; France	Jelena Kovačević; Croatia	Yassmin Hamdy; Egypt
Women's kumite 61 kg	Lina Gómez; Colombia	Jacqueline Factos; Ecuador	Olga Malofeeva; Russia
Women's kumite 68 kg	Kayo Someya; Japan	Ana Escandón; Colombia	Cheryl Murphy; United States
Women's kumite +68 kg	Ayumi Uekusa; Japan	Nadège Aït-Ibrahim; France	Isabel Aco; Peru
