= Softball at the 2013 World Games =

- Venue: Jaime Aparicio Sports Unit
- Dates: 26–30 July 2013
- Competitors: 109 from 6 nations

Softball was contested at the 2013 World Games in Cali, Colombia as an invitational sport. The sole event, the women's softball tournament, was held at the Softball Coliseum in the Jaime Aparicio Sports Unit (Spanish: Unidad Deportiva Jaime Aparicio), a stadium built for the World Games.

== Participating nations ==
- Argentina (17)
- Aruba (15)
- Colombia (24)
- Cuba (16)
- Guatemala (17)
- Venezuela (20)

== Preliminary round ==
The preliminary round was played in a round-robin format.

Team	Pld	W	L	RF	RA	RD	PCT
Venezuela	5	5	0	41	4	+36	1.000
Cuba	5	4	1	36	11	+25	.800
Colombia	5	3	2	22	17	+5	.600
Guatemala	5	2	3	29	30	–1	.400
Argentina	5	1	4	23	47	–24	.200
Aruba	5	0	5	6	48	–42	.000

Date	Time	Results		
26 July	9:00	Guatemala	13 - 2	Aruba
26 July	11:15	Cuba	4 - 8	Venezuela
26 July	13:30	Argentina	8 - 10	Guatemala
26 July	15:45	Cuba	10 - 0	Aruba
26 July	19:15	Colombia	9 - 1	Argentina
27 July	9:00	Cuba	11 - 1	Argentina
27 July	11:15	Aruba	0 - 10	Venezuela
27 July	13:30	Guatemala	6 - 9	Colombia
27 July	15:45	Venezuela	13 - 0	Argentina
27 July	18:00	Guatemala	0 - 4	Cuba
27 July	20:15	Colombia	2 - 0	Aruba
28 July	11:15	Venezuela	3 - 0	Colombia
28 July	13:30	Aruba	4 - 13	Argentina
28 July	15:45	Venezuela	7 - 0	Guatemala
28 July	18:00	Colombia	2 - 7	Cuba

== Knockout stage ==
Semi-finals
Cuba	3
Venezuela	1
Guatemala	2
Colombia	5

Final
Cuba	3
Venezuela	2
Bronze medal match
Venezuela	7
Colombia	0

Fifth-place playoff
Argentina	2
Aruba	8

Match	Date	Time	Results		
Fifth-place playoff	29 July	9:30	Argentina	2 - 8	Aruba
Semifinals	29 July	12:00	Guatemala	2 - 5	Colombia
Semifinals	29 July	14:30	Cuba	3 - 1	Venezuela
Bronze medal match	30 July	13:00	Venezuela	7 - 0	Colombia
Final	30 July	17:00	Cuba	3 - 2	Venezuela

== Final rankings ==
Rank	Team
Gold medal	Cuba
Silver medal	Venezuela
Bronze medal	Colombia
4	Guatemala
5	Aruba
6	Argentina
