= Ju-jitsu at the 2013 World Games – Men's fighting 77 kg =

Men's fighting 77 kg at the 2013 World Games
- Venue: Evagelista Mora Coliseum
- Date: 30 July 2013
- Competitors: 6 from 6 nations

Medalists
1st place, gold medalist(s)		(Denmark) Danny Mathiasen
2nd place, silver medalist(s)		(Russia) Ilya Borok
3rd place, bronze medalist(s)		(Netherlands) Johan de Gier

The men's fighting 77 kg competition in ju-jitsu at the 2013 World Games took place on 30 July 2013 at the Evagelista Mora Coliseum in Cali, Colombia.

== Results ==
=== Elimination round ===
==== Group A ====
Rank	Athlete	B	W	L	Pts	Score
1	Danny Mathiasen (DEN)	2	2	0	27–8	+19
2	Ilya Borok (RUS)	2	1	1	56–14	+42
3	Percy Kunsa (FRA)	2	0	2	2–63	–61

	Score	
Percy Kunsa (FRA)	2–13	Danny Mathiasen (DEN)
Percy Kunsa (FRA)	0–50	Ilya Borok (RUS)
Danny Mathiasen (DEN)	14–6	Ilya Borok (RUS)

==== Group B ====
Rank	Athlete	B	W	L	Pts	Score
1	Johan de Gier (NED)	2	2	0	68–15	+53
2	Fredrik Widgren (SWE)	2	1	1	32–28	+4
3	Juan Pablo Vietri (ARG)	2	0	2	10–67	–57

	Score	
Fredrik Widgren (SWE)	15–18	Johan de Gier (NED)
Fredrik Widgren (SWE)	17–10	Juan Pablo Vietri (ARG)
Johan de Gier (NED)	50–0	Juan Pablo Vietri (ARG)

=== Finals ===
Semifinals
Danny Mathiasen (DEN)	12
Fredrik Widgren (SWE)	11
Johan de Gier (NED)	0
Ilya Borok (RUS)	50

Final
Danny Mathiasen (DEN)	7
Ilya Borok (RUS)	5
Third place
Fredrik Widgren (SWE)	8
Johan de Gier (NED)	9
