= Sport climbing at the 2013 World Games =

Competition climbing event

- Venue: Velodrome Exterior
- Location: Cali
- Dates: 3–4 August 2013
- Competitors: 68 from 21 nations

Competition climbing at the World Games 2013 took place from August 3 to August 4, in Cali in Colombia, at the Velodrome Exterior. 68 sportsmen from 21 nations participated in the event, which included competition lead climbing and competition speed climbing disciplines.

== Schedule ==
All times are in Colombia Time (UTC-05:00).

Saturday, 3 August 2013

- 17:30 Men's Speed qualification
- 18:00 Women's Speed qualification
- 20:12 Men's & Women's Speed final

Sunday, 4 August 2013

- 08:30 Men's & Women's Lead semifinal
- 13:10 Men's & Women's Lead final

== Participating nations ==
- Austria (6)
- Canada (2)
- Chile (1)
- China (2)
- Colombia (4)
- Czech Republic (1)
- Ecuador (1)
- France (7)
- Germany (1)
- Indonesia (1)
- Italy (1)
- Norway (1)
- Poland (4)
- Russia (15)
- Slovenia (2)
- South Korea (3)
- Spain (1)
- Sweden (1)
- Ukraine (3)
- United States (3)
- Venezuela (8)

== Medalists ==
Event	Gold	Silver	Bronze
Men
Speed	Dmitrii Timofeev; Russia	Stanislav Kokorin; Russia	Zhong Qixin; China
Lead	Ramón Julián Puigblanqué; Spain	Jakob Schubert; Austria	Magnus Midtbø; Norway
Women
Speed	Alina Gaidamakina; Russia	Mariia Krasavina; Russia	Iuliia Kaplina; Russia
Lead	Mina Markovič; Slovenia	Kim Ja-in; South Korea	Dinara Fakhritdinova; Russia

== Medals table ==
Rank	Nation	Gold	Silver	Bronze	Total
1	Russia (RUS)	2	2	2	6
2	Slovenia (SLO)	1	0	0	1
2	Spain (ESP)	1	0	0	1
4	Austria (AUT)	0	1	0	1
4	South Korea (KOR)	0	1	0	1
6	China (CHN)	0	0	1	1
6	Norway (NOR)	0	0	1	1
Totals (7 entries)		4	4	4	12
