= Turkey at the 2022 World Games =

- IOC code: TUR
- NOC: Turkish Olympic Committee

in Birmingham, United States 7 July 2022 – 17 July 2022
- Competitors: 3 (2 men and 1 woman) in 2 sports and 3 events
- Medals: Gold 0 Silver 0 Bronze 0 Total 0

World Games appearances
- 1981; 1985; 1989; 1993; 1997; 2001; 2005; 2009; 2013; 2017; 2022; 2025

Turkey competed at the 2022 World Games held in Birmingham, United States from 7 to 17 July 2022.

== Competitors ==
The following is the list of number of competitors in the Games.

Sport	Men	Women	Total
Cue sports	1	1	2
Finswimming	1	0	1
Total	2	1	3

== Cue sports ==
Turkey competed in cue sports.

Men

Athlete	Event	Round of 16	Quarterfinal	Semifinal	Final / BM
Athlete	Event	Opposition Result	Opposition Result	Opposition Result	Opposition Result
Tayfun Taşdemir	Men's 3-cushion carom	Garcia (COL); L 35-40	did not advance		

Women

Athlete	Event	Round of 16	Quarterfinal	Semifinal	Final / BM
Athlete	Event	Opposition Result	Opposition Result	Opposition Result	Opposition Result
Eylül Kibaroğlu	Women's nine-ball	Zalewska (POL); L 4-9	did not advance		

== Finswimming ==
Turkey competed in finswimming.

Athlete	Event	Final	
Athlete	Event	Time	Rank
Derin Toparlak	Men's 400 m surface	3:03.14	7
