= Tomáš Ježek (canoeist) =

Czech flatwater canoer (born 1973)

Medal record

Men's canoe marathon

Representing Czech Republic

World Championships
Silver medal – second place	2008 Týn nad Vltavou	K-1 marathon

World Games
Silver medal – second place	2013 Cali	K-2 marathon

European Championships
Bronze medal – third place	2009 Ostróda	K-2 marathon
Bronze medal – third place	2011 Saint Jean de Losne	K-2 marathon

Tomáš Ježek (born 28 October 1973, Hradec Králové) is a Czech flatwater canoer who has been competing in canoe marathon on international level since 1994. Competing at many World Championships in marathon he won one silver medal on K1 in Týn nad Vltavou 2008.

== Career history ==
Ježek began kayaking in the early childhood and entered international kayak scene as a member of the junior Czech sprint team. In 1994 he has started to race at ICF marathon events. He finished 4th at the World Marathon Championships in Győr 1999 and Perth 2005, where he lost the medal to Ben Fouhy on the finish line.

In 2006 and 2007 Ježek became a part of the Czech canoe sprint team and fought for the Olympic Games in K2-1000m category with Ondřej Horský. They finished 6th at the European Championships in 2007 but failed to qualify for the Olympics at the World Championships.

In 2008 Ježek came back to the marathon racing and won a silver medal on K1 at the World Marathon Championships in Týn nad Vltavou losing the finish battle for gold to Emilio Merchán Alonso.

In 2009 Ježek won a bronze medal at the European Marathon Championships in Ostróda on K2 with Michael Odvárko. He finished 6th at the World Marathon Championships in Crestuma on K1 and 8th on K2 with the same partner.

In 2010 he changed K2 partner and started to race with Petr Jambor, his club mate. Although they were winning medals at World Cups in marathon on K1 and K2, they failed to win a medal at the World Marathon Championships in Banyoles finishing 6th.

In 2011 Ježek won a bronze medal at the European Marathon Championships in Saint Jean de Losne on K2 with Petr Jambor and they finished 4th at the World Marathon Championships in Singapore.
