= Mayles Rodríguez =

Venezuelan softball player (born 1989)

Personal information
- Born: 3 April 1989 (age 37) Acarigua, Venezuela

Sport
- Sport: Softball
Medal record
Women's softball
Representing Venezuela
World Games
Silver medal – second place	2013 Cali	Team competition

Mayles Rodríguez (born 3 April 1989) is a Venezuelan softball player. She competed in the women's tournament at the 2008 Summer Olympics.
