= Finswimming at the 2013 World Games =

- Venue: Hernando Botero Swimming Pool
- Location: Cali
- Dates: 26–27 July 2013
- Competitors: 84 from 16 nations

The finswimming competition at the 2013 World Games took place on 26 to 27 July 2013 in Cali, Colombia, at the Hernando Botero Swimming Pool.

== Participating nations ==
- Austria (4)
- China (10)
- Colombia (8)
- Chinese Taipei (1)
- Czech Republic (1)
- Estonia (4)
- France (5)
- Germany (6)
- Hungary (5)
- Italy (4)
- Japan (4)
- Poland (2)
- Russia (9)
- Slovakia (1)
- South Korea (10)
- Ukraine (10)

== Medals table ==
| Rank | Nation | Gold | Silver | Bronze | Total |
|---|---|---|---|---|---|
| 1 | Russia (RUS) | 4 | 4 | 1 | 9 |
| 2 | Germany (GER) | 2 | 0 | 0 | 2 |
| 3 | Italy (ITA) | 1 | 1 | 1 | 3 |
| 4 | France (FRA) | 1 | 0 | 1 | 2 |
| 4 | South Korea (KOR) | 1 | 0 | 1 | 2 |
| 6 | Hungary (HUN) | 1 | 0 | 0 | 1 |
| 7 | Ukraine (UKR) | 0 | 3 | 3 | 6 |
| 8 | Colombia (COL) | 0 | 1 | 2 | 3 |
| 9 | China (CHN) | 0 | 1 | 1 | 2 |
| Totals (9 entries) | | 10 | 10 | 10 | 30 |

== Medals summary ==
=== Men ===
| Event | Gold | | Silver | | Bronze | |
|---|---|---|---|---|---|---|
| 50 m apnoea | (South Korea) Kim Tae-kyun | 14.01 | (Russia) Pavel Kabanov | 14.02 | (Colombia) Mauricio Fernandez Castillo | 14.04 |
| 100 m surface | (Italy) Cesare Fumarola | 35.06 GR | (Russia) Pavel Kabanov | 35.40 | (France) Alexandre Noir | 35.54 |
| 200 m surface | (Germany) Max Lauschus | 1:21.31 GR | (Italy) Stefano Figini | 1:21.45 | (Russia) Dmitry Kokorev | 1:22.06 |
| 400 m surface | (Germany) Max Lauschus | 2:58.00 GR | (Russia) Evgeny Smirnov | 2:58.75 | (Italy) Stefano Figini | 3:01.54 |
| 4 x 100 m surface relay | Russia; Pavel Kabanov (35.57); Aleksey Kazantsev (35.73); Andrei Barabash (34.71); Dmitry Kokorev (34.84) | 2:20.85 GR | Colombia; Juan Ocampo Lozada (35.55); Juan Duque Jimenez (36.38); Mauricio Fernandez Castillo (34.79); Leonidas Romero Rivera (35.10) | 2:21.82 | Ukraine; Dmytro Sydorenko (36.30); Oleksandr Konkov (34.95); Evgen Stepanchuk (35.68); Denys Grubnik (36.09) | 2:23.02 |

=== Women ===
| Event | Gold | | Silver | | Bronze | |
|---|---|---|---|---|---|---|
| 50 m apnoea | (France) Camille Heitz | 16.24 | (China) Xu Huanshan | 16.25 | (Ukraine) Margaryta Artiushenko | 16.27 |
| 100 m surface | (Hungary) Lilla Székely | 39.54 | (Ukraine) Margaryta Artiushenko | 39.93 | (Colombia) Grace Fernandez Castillo | 40.18 |
| 200 m surface | (Russia) Valeriya Baranovskaya | 1:28.74 GR | (Russia) Vasilisa Kravchuk | 1:28.82 | (Ukraine) Yana Trofymez | 1:30.84 |
| 400 m surface | (Russia) Vasilisa Kravchuk | 3:17.04 | (Ukraine) Yana Trofymez | 3:20.08 | (South Korea) Kim Bo-kyung | 3:20.68 |
| 4 x 100 m surface relay | Russia; Vasilisa Kravchuk (39.83); Valeriya Baranovskaya (40.18); Elena Kononova (40.63); Vera Ilyushina (39.41) | 2:40.05 | Ukraine; Anastasiia Antoniak (41.01); Olga Shlyakhovska (40.60); Yana Trofymez (40.30); Margarita Artiushenko (40.38) | 2:42.29 | China; Liu Jing (41.30); Liang Yaoyue (40.01); Liu Jiao (41.31); Xu Yichuan (39.74) | 2:42.36 |
