= Peru at the 2013 World Games =

- IOC code: PER

in Cali, Colombia 25 July 2013 – 4 August 2013
- Medals: Gold 0 Silver 0 Bronze 1 Total 1

World Games appearances
- 1981; 1985; 1989; 1993; 1997; 2001; 2005; 2009; 2013; 2017; 2022; 2025

Peru competed at the 2013 World Games held in Cali, Colombia.

== Medalists ==
Medal	Name	Sport	Event
Bronze	Isabel Aco	Karate	Women's kumite +68 kg

== Karate ==
Isabel Aco won the bronze medal in the women's kumite +68 kg event.

== Squash ==
Diego Elías competed in the men's singles event.
