= Serbia at the 2013 World Games =

- IOC code: SRB

in Cali, Colombia 25 July 2013 – 4 August 2013
- Medals: Gold 0 Silver 0 Bronze 1 Total 1

World Games appearances
- 1981; 1985; 1989; 1993; 1997; 2001; 2005; 2009; 2013; 2017; 2022

Serbia competed at the 2013 World Games held in Cali, Colombia.

== Medalists ==
Medal	Name	Sport	Event
Bronze	Milica Marinković	Air sports	Women's paragliding accuracy

== Air sports ==
Milica Marinković won the bronze medal in the women's paragliding accuracy event.
