= Turkey at the 2013 World Games =

- IOC code: TUR

in Cali, Colombia 25 July 2013 – 4 August 2013
- Medals: Gold 1 Silver 1 Bronze 1 Total 3

World Games appearances
- 1981; 1985; 1989; 1993; 1997; 2001; 2005; 2009; 2013; 2017; 2022; 2025

Turkey competed at the 2013 World Games held in Cali, Colombia.

== Medalists ==
Medal	Name	Sport	Event
Gold	Serap Özçelik	Karate	Women's kumite 50 kg
Silver	Hüseyin Dündar	Wushu	Men's sanda 56 kg
Bronze	Savaş Bekar	Wushu	Men's sanda 65 kg

== Ju-jitsu ==
Kiraz Sahin competed in the women's fighting 62 kg event.

== Karate ==
Serap Özçelik won the gold medal in the women's kumite 50 kg event.
