= Kateryna Sytnikova =

Ukrainian acrobatic gymnast

- Born: 22 May 1989 (age 37) Odesa, Ukrainian SSR, Soviet Union

Gymnastics career
- Discipline: Acrobatic gymnastics
- Country represented: Ukraine
- Head coach: Natalia Struk
Medal record
Women's acrobatic gymnastics
Representing Ukraine
World Games
Silver medal – second place	2013 Cali	Pairs all-around
World Championships
Gold medal – first place	2010 Wrocław	Pairs all-around
Gold medal – first place	2012 Lake Buena Vista	Pairs all-around
European Championships
Gold medal – first place	2011 Varna	Pairs balance
Silver medal – second place	2009 Vila do Conde	Pairs dynamic
Bronze medal – third place	2011 Varna	Pairs all-around
Bronze medal – third place	2011 Varna	Pairs dynamic

Kateryna Sytnikova (Ukrainian: Катерина Ситнікова, born 22 May 1989) is a Ukrainian female acrobatic gymnast.

== Life ==
Sytnikova was born on 22 May 1989 in Odesa.

== Career ==
In 2007, Sytnikova with her partner Anastasiya Melnychenko debuted competing at the European Junior Championships, held in 's-Hertogenbosch, where they finished 5th in the pairs all-around event.

In 2009, they captured the silver medal in the pairs all-around event at the 18th International Acrobatic Gymnastics Tournament "Stars above the Boug River", held in Vinnytsia. The duo also competed at the European Championships, held in Vila do Conde, finishing 2nd in pairs dynamic, 6th in pairs all-around and 7th in pairs balance.

The following year, the duo Sytnikova/Melnychenko became a world champion in the pairs all-around event at the 2010 Acrobatic Gymnastics World Championships, held in Wrocław.

At the 2011 Acrobatic Gymnastics European Championships the duo won a gold medal in the pairs balance event and two bronze medals in the all-around and dynamic events.

In 2012, Sytnikova and Melnychenko won a gold medal in the pairs all-around event at the World Championships, becoming twice world champions.

The following year, the duo competed at the 2013 World Games in Cali, winning a silver medal in the pairs all-around event.

After the World Games Sytnikova finished her career.

== Later life ==
In 2013, Sytnikova and Melnychenko emigrated to Canada, where they began their circus career in Cirque du Soleil. They also became members of the Cirque's Varekai.

Now the duo Sytnikova/Melnychenko and Ellariya Bohdanova are circus performers in the Las Vegas show Absinthe.
