= Ana Castellain =

Brazilian powerlifter (born 1985)

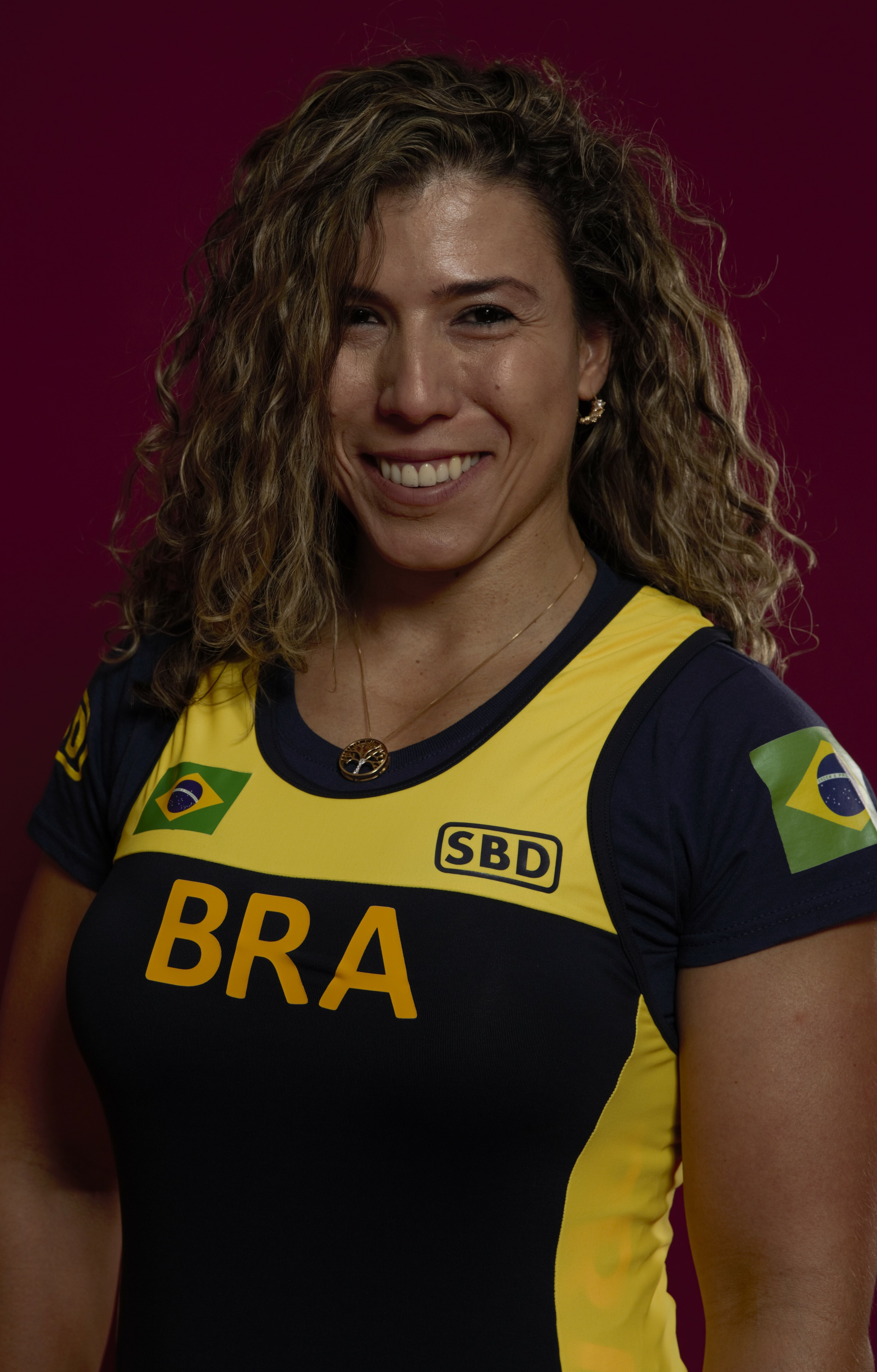
- Castellain in 2018.

Personal information
- Born: August 31, 1985 (age 40) Blumenau, Brazil
- Height: 5 ft 3 in (160 cm)
- Weight: 69 kg (152 lb)

Sport
- Country: Brazil
- Sport: Powerlifting
- Weight class: 69 Kg open
- Team: CBLB - Brazilian Confederation of Powerlifting
- Turned pro: 2006 - currently

Achievements and titles
- World finals: 16 world records (7 gold medals).
- National finals: sixteen gold medals
Medal record
Representing Brazil
World Games
Gold medal – first place	2017 Wrocław	Heavyweight
Gold medal – first place	2013 Cali	Heavyweight
IPF Equipped World Championships
Gold medal – first place	2021 Stavanger	69 kg
Gold medal – first place	2016 Orlando	72 kg
Silver medal – second place	2015 Luxembourg	72 kg
Silver medal – second place	2014 Aurora	72kg
Gold medal – first place	2013 Stavanger	72 kg
Silver medal – second place	2012 Aguadilla	72 kg
Bronze medal – third place	2011 Plzeň	72 kg
IPF Classic World Championships
Gold medal – first place	2018 Calgary	72 kg
Silver medal – second place	2017 Minsk	72 kg
Gold medal – first place	2016 Killeen	84 kg
Silver medal – second place	2014 Potchefstroom	72 kg
Pan American Equipped Championships
Gold medal – first place	2019 Piriápolis	72 kg
Gold medal – first place	2015 Ribeirão Preto	72 kg
Gold medal – first place	2011 Luján	72 kg
Gold medal – first place	2009 Miami	67.5 kg
Silver medal – second place	2007 São Paulo	56 kg
Pan American Juniors Equipped Championships
Gold medal – first place	2007 São Paulo	56 kg
Arnold Classic Europe EPF
Gold medal – first place	2018 Barcelona	72 kg
Arnold Classic South American
Gold medal – first place	2019 São Paulo	72 kg
Gold medal – first place	2017 São Paulo	72 kg
Gold medal – first place	2013 Rio de Janeiro	72 kg
South American Equipped Championships
Gold medal – first place	2014 Guayaquil	72 kg
Gold medal – first place	2013 Quito	72 kg
Gold medal – first place	2012 Cali	72 kg
Silver medal – second place	2008 Quito	67.5 kg
South American Classic Championships
Gold medal – first place	2019 Piriápolis	72 kg
Gold medal – first place	2018 Guayaquil	72 kg
Gold medal – first place	2017 Buenos Aires	72 kg
Gold medal – first place	2015 Ribeirão Preto	72 kg
South American Juniors Equipped Championships
Silver medal – second place	2008 Quito	67.5 kg
CBLB Equipped National Championships
Gold medal – first place	2021 Rio de Janeiro	69 kg
Gold medal – first place	2017 Santo André	72 kg
Gold medal – first place	2012 Itu	72 kg
Gold medal – first place	2011 São Paulo	72 kg
Silver medal – second place	2010 São Bento do Sul	67.5 kg
Gold medal – first place	2008 São Bento do Sul	67.5 kg
CBLB National Juniors Equipped Championships
Gold medal – first place	2008 São Bento do Sul	67.5 kg
Gold medal – first place	2007 São Paulo	56 kg
Gold medal – first place	2006 Cambé	56 kg
South American Equipped Bench Press Championships
Gold medal – first place	2010 São Sebastião	75 kg
South American Junior Equipped Bench Press Championships
Gold medal – first place	2021 Rio de Janeiro	69 kg
Gold medal – first place	2020 Joinville	72 kg
Gold medal – first place	2019 Santos	72 kg
Gold medal – first place	2018 Curitiba	72 kg
Gold medal – first place	2017 Ribeirão Preto	72 kg
Gold medal – first place	2016 Curitiba	72 kg
Gold medal – first place	2014 Itu	72 kg
Gold medal – first place	2009 Itu	67.5 kg
- Updated on July 12, 2022

Ana Rosa Castellain (born August 31, 1985) is a Brazilian powerlifter and seven-time world champion. She became the main Brazilian athlete active in the country after originally being inducted into the IPF Hall of Fame. She currently resides and trains in the city of Garopaba on the coast of Santa Catarina.

With an academic background in Physical Education, she works as a personal trainer and coach of powerlifting athletes across the country.

In September 2022, Castellain's urine sample, collected out-of-competition on 30 November 2021, revealed the presence of an Anabolic Androgenic Steroid, resulting in a 4-year sanction ban and removal from the IPF Hall of Fame class of 2018.

== Early life ==
Born in the city of Blumenau, daughter of Amândio Castellain and Maria Dolores Castellain, she was interested in body expression, movement and emotion since she was a child. She started in ballet at the age of eight, and in 1996, at the age of eleven, she took her first steps in athletics. The following year, she began her sports career as a runner, staying for twelve years in athletics.

== Career ==
=== Athletics ===
==== 1997–2012 ====
She started her career at the age of twelve as a runner. She participated several times in the Santa Catarina Open Games (JASC), representing the municipality of Blumenau with numerous achievements in the modality. In 2009, Ana was dismissed from the Blumenau team. In 2010, she received offers from Jaraguá do Sul to be part of their athletics team. In 2011, she competed in the adult state athletics championship in the city of Itajaí. Winning the gold medal in the heptathlon, it was her penultimate participation in the modality. After being invited by the same municipality in 2012, she competed in the adult state athletics championship for the last time.

=== Powerlifting ===
==== 2006–2009 ====
Ana started participating in competitions in 2006, even though she was an athletics athlete. Her first international competition was in São Paulo, South American Powerlifting Championship in 2006, with only twenty years old, weighing 54.8 kg, she participated in the junior category, she was disqualified after three failed attempts in the bench press, learning that the young athlete would take for the rest of her life. In 2007 in her first Pan-American, she won the gold medal in the Junior category and record in the squat with a lift of 170 kg. In 2008, it was her turn to compete abroad, in the city of Quito in Ecuador, in the Junior category, she won a silver medal and a bench press record with a lifting of 100 kg. In May 2009, after being released from the Blumenau athletics team, she decided to take up a career in powerlifting professionally, dedicating herself exclusively to training in the discipline. That same year she went to the United States for her second Pan-American, a gold medal for Brazil, this time in the open category.

==== 2010–2013 ====
She ended 2010 winning the South American bench press championship with a new South American record of 147.5 kg.

In 2011, she had another Pan-American and another gold medal, this time in Luján, Argentina, breaking the record again. To end the year, the athlete won the bronze medal in her first participation in world championships in the city of Plzeň in the Czech Republic.

One hour someone will look at me.... no matter the day!

— Ana Rosa Castellain

In 2012, Ana secured the gold medal in the South American Equipped Championships with several records in the lifts. She ended the year with her second world championship in Aguadilla, Puerto Rico with the silver medal, yet this was not the time when gold would shine in the athlete's hand at world championships. In 2013, she won three gold medals in international competitions in a single season, two of which in world championships (World Games in Cali and World Championships in Stavanger). with record breaking in several brands and a medal in the South American in Quito, Ecuador.

==== 2014–2017 ====
In 2014, she started the season with a gold medal in the Brazilian championship in the city of Itu in São Paulo and ended the year with a silver medal in the world championship in the city of Potchefstroom in South Africa. She finished her bachelor's degree in the same semester in Physical Education. The second semester starts with a gold medal in the South American championship in the city of Guayaquil in Ecuador and ends the semester with a silver medal in Colorado in the United States. At the end of the year, she decided to move from Blumenau to Garopaba to seek new job opportunities in her area of academic training and intensify her training. In 2015, she started the year with a serious car accident. She returned to competitions only on September 16, 2015, at the Pan-American in the city of Ribeirão Preto in the State of São Paulo, winning two gold medals, in raw and equipped, and breaking a record. On November 9, she won a silver medal at the 2015 World Powerlifting Championships in Luxembourg. In 2016, her main international achievements were two gold medals at world championships in the United States in the cities of Killeen and Orlando. She won a gold in the Brazilian championship in the city of Curitiba in the state of Paraná, beating the competition record. In 2017, sge won several gold medals: Brazilian equipped championship in Santo André, Brazilian raw championship in Ribeirão Preto, South American raw championship in Buenos Aires and world games in Wrocław. She won a silver medal at the world championships in Minsk.

Smaller than my dream I cannot be

— Lindolf Bell,

==== 2018–2022 ====
In 2018, the athlete continued to surpass her records with four more competitions and four more gold medals. In March a Brazilian championship in Curitiba in the State of Paraná, in June a world championship in Calgary in Canada, in July a South American championship in Guayaquil in Ecuador and in September a European competition, “Arnold Classic Europe” in Barcelona, Spain, with the presence of the star Arnold Schwarzenegger as host of the event.

Start the year 2019 beating the Brazilian and personal record in the deadlift category up to 72 kg with the mark of 212.5 kg in the Brazilian championship held in Santos; she won the competition with a total of 530 kg weighing 68.95 kg. Second important competition on Brazilian soil, Arnold Classic South American, in São Paulo; new Brazilian record in deadlift with 213 kg won with a total of 523 kg, becoming three-time champion of the competition. Ana Castellain travels in the beginning of the second half of May to the bench press world championship in Japan and in Russia she is prevented from continuing her trip due to the incorrect provision of her entry visa to Japan. With her luggage lost and without an immigration card, she remained in Russia without being able to strictly comply with her training schedule, which was to train in Norway until the World Cup in Sweden. After all adversity on June 10 she manages to make it to Helsingborg in Sweden for the world championship. She faces a tough world where only 15 kilos separated the top five. The athlete lets slip her 13th medal in worlds after failing her last request in the deadlift, even so she wins gold in the bench press and fourth place in the world. In September, the first competition after the World Cup in Sweden, the South American and Pan American Championships in Piriápolis, Uruguay. The fully restored athlete wins eight gold medals, six medals for movement with multiple record breaks and two total medals for breaking two world records. In raw she sets a South American record in the squat with 196.5 kg, a new Brazilian and South American record in the deadlift with 214.0 kg and a world record with a total of 540.5 kg. In the equipped, a new Pan American record in the squat with 255.5 kg, in the bench press with 180.5 kg, in the deadlift another record with 225 kg and a world record with the mark of 661.0 kg in total. Achievement of the 100th gold medal in competitions.

On February 15, 2020, the first important competition of the year, the Brazilian championship in Joinville, Santa Catarina. The athlete in the preparatory phase for the Sheffield 2020 – Powerlifting Championships in March, performs a smooth competition and does enough for another gold achievement with a total of 515 kg. In March the Sheffield 2020 – Powerlifting Championships and other international and national competitions are postponed due to the rampant spread of the coronavirus.

In October 2021 the athlete returns from the World Championships in Halmstad, Sweden with a modest fourth place, and returns to compete at the national level in the 2021 Brazilian Powerlifting Championships in Rio de Janeiro. In Rio de Janeiro she did not have great difficulties to win in equipped and raw, showing her superiority among Brazilian athletes. On November 10, the big day of the Stavanger World Championships arrives in Norway, this time in equipped, the athlete climbs to the highest place on the podium to receive her seventh gold medal in worlds and beat another world record with 630 kg total, in the -69 kg/open category.

==== Doping ban ====
On September 15, 2022, the IPF announced that Castellain's urine samples from 2021 revealed the presence of Metandienone. She is currently suspended from competing in the IPF until January 11, 2026. She would also be removed from the IPF Hall of Fame.

== World Games ==
Two-time world champion at the World Games, she won the gold medal at the 2013 and 2017 World Games. At the 2013 World Games, gold was won after beating the world record in the squat with 248.5 kg. In the bench press she lifted 162.5 kg, and in the deadlift 200 kg. At the 2017 World Games, she again won gold in the same category.

== See also ==
- List of world championships medalists in powerlifting (women)
- Powerlifting at the World Games
- Brazil at the 2017 World Games
