= Morocco at the 2013 World Games =

- IOC code: MAR

in Cali, Colombia 25 July 2013 – 4 August 2013
- Competitors: 3 in 1 sport
- Medals: Gold 0 Silver 0 Bronze 1 Total 1

World Games appearances
- 1981; 1985; 1989; 1993; 1997; 2001; 2005; 2009; 2013; 2017; 2022

Morocco competed at the 2013 World Games held in Cali, Colombia. Three competitors represented Morocco at the event, all in karate.

== Medalists ==
| Medal | Name | Sport | Event |
|---|---|---|---|
| Bronze | El-Mehdi Benrouida | Karate | Men's kumite 60 kg |

== Karate ==
El-Mehdi Benrouida won the bronze medal in the men's kumite 60 kg event.
