= Greece at the 2013 World Games =

- IOC code: GRE

in Cali, Colombia 25 July 2013 – 4 August 2013
- Medals: Gold 0 Silver 1 Bronze 1 Total 2

World Games appearances (overview)
- 1981; 1985; 1989; 1993; 1997; 2001; 2005; 2009; 2013; 2017; 2022

Greece competed at the 2013 World Games held in Cali, Colombia.

== Medalists ==
| Medal | Name | Sport | Event |
|---|---|---|---|
| Silver | Marie Vympranietsova | Water skiing | Women's jump |
| Bronze | Georgios Tzanos | Karate | Men's kumite 84 kg |

== Karate ==
Georgios Tzanos won the bronze medal in the men's kumite 84 kg event.

== Water skiing ==
Marie Vympranietsova won the silver medal in the women's jump event.
