= Vadym Dovhanyuk =

Ukrainian powerlifter (born 1987)

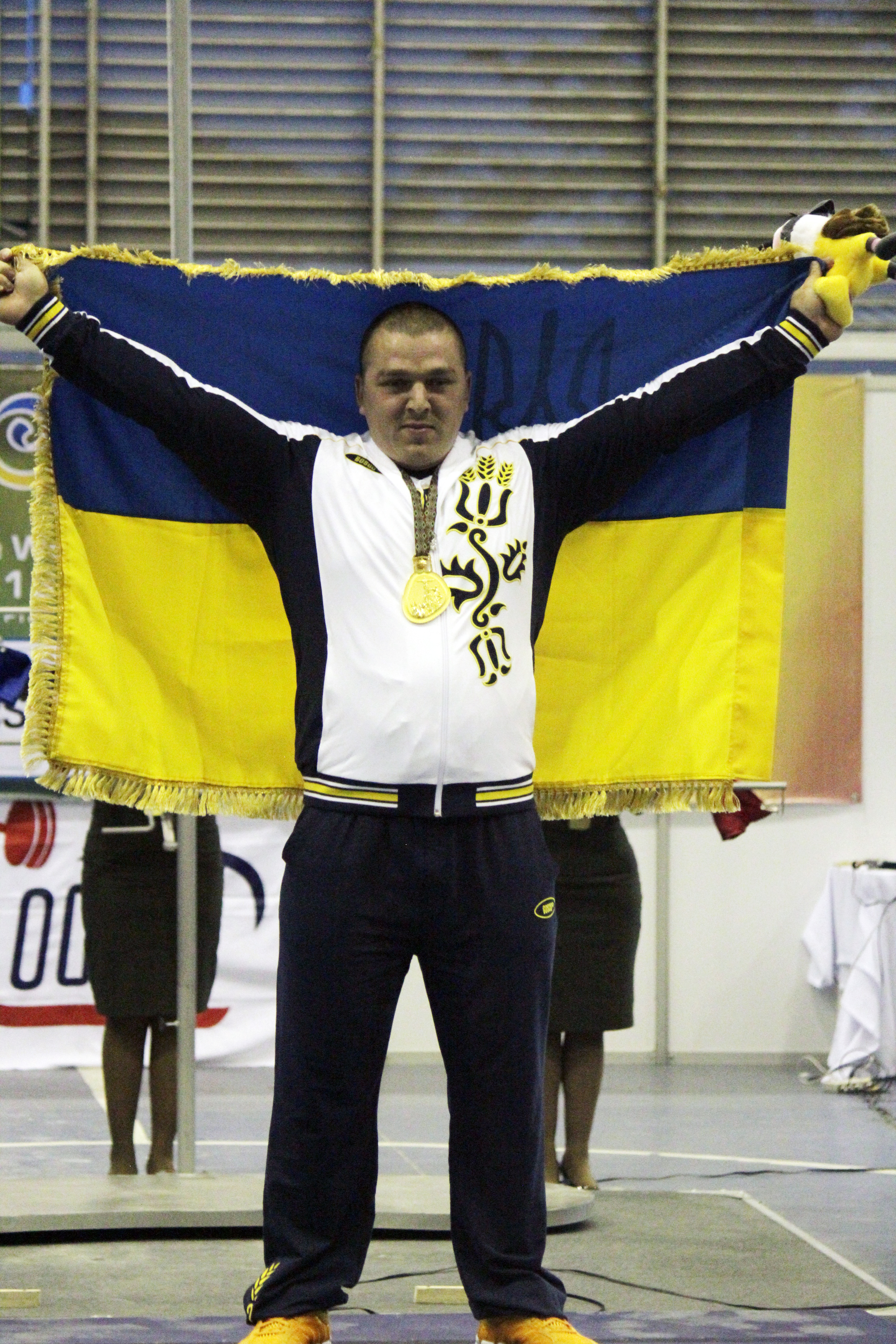
- World Games 2013, Cali, Colombia

Personal information
- Native name: Вадим Довганюк
- Born: Dovhanyuk Vadym Volodymyrovych; January 15, 1987 (age 39) Volochysk, Ukraine
- Education: Kamyanets-Podilsky Ivan Ohienko National University
- Height: 171 cm (5 ft 7 in)
- Weight: 105 kg (231 lb)
- Spouse: Inna Dovhanyuk
- Website: vadymdovhanyuk.com

Sport
- Country: Ukraine
- Sport: Powerlifting
- Weight class: 100 kg
- Updated on 14 February 2016

Competition record

Powerlifting

Representing Ukraine

World Games
Gold medal – first place	2013 Cali	+105kg

IPF World Championship
1st	2012	105kg
1st	2013	105kg

IPF World Bench Press Championship
1st	2015	+105kg
1st	2014	+105kg

European Open Men's Bench Press Championships
1st	2015	+105kg

34th European Open Men's Championships
1st	2011	+105kg

28th World Juniors Men's Championships
1st	2010 Plzeň	-110kg

27th World Juniors Men's Championships
1st	2009 Ribeirão Preto	-100kg

21st European Juniors Men's Championships
2nd	2005 Mariupol	-90kg

Vadym Dovhanyuk (Ukrainian: Вадим Довганюк. Also known as Vadym Dovganyuk; born January 15, 1987) is an 11 times world champion powerlifter and World Games 2013 champion. He holds 36 unbeaten records in powerlifting and bench press. His personal records are squat – 410 kg, bench press – 335.5 kg, deadlift – 325 kg and total 1050.5 kg.

== Biography ==
Dovhanyuk Vadym Volodymyrovych was born on January 15, 1987, in city Volochysk, Khmelnytskyi Oblast, Ukraine. In 2004 he graduated from the Volochisk School No.5. In 2011 he graduated from Kamyanets-Podilsky Ivan Ohienko National University by speciality Physical culture and Sport.

Vadym started powerlifting in 15 years in the small gym owned Volochisk Machine-Building Plant "Motor Sich". Through "Motor Sich" Vadym in 2004 went to the first World Cup held in Pretoria, South Africa for the first time and became world champion. After these events were 10 world championships where Vadym stood on the highest step of the base (pedestal).

At the age of 17 fulfilled standard of master of sports of Ukraine. At 19 fulfilled standard of master of sports of Ukraine of international class. In 2011, he was in the main part of the national team of Ukraine. In 2012 at the World Championships in Puerto Rico received a license to participate in the most qualified powerlifting competitions (World Games) held in Colombia in 2013, where Vadym became champion and set two world records in bench press. After the victory in 2013 received the highest title of Honored Master of Sports and National Award — Order of Merit III class.

== Personal life ==
In 2008 married to Inna Mykolaevna Dovhaniuk. In 2009, a son Ivan was born.

== Awards ==
- Order of Merit Third Class (14 September 2013)
- World champion among youth of 2004, 2006, 2007 — World Sub Juniors Champion
- Junior 2009, 2010 – World Juniors Champion
- among adults by 2013, 2014, 2015 – Worlds Open Champion
- 33 existing world records.
- Champion of the World Games in Colombia in 2013.

== See also ==
- List of world championships medalists in powerlifting (men)
- Powerlifting at the World Games
