= Vietnam at the 2013 World Games =

- IOC code: VIE
- NOC: Vietnam Olympic Committee
- Website: www.voc.org.vn (in Vietnamese and English)

in Cali, Colombia
- Competitors: 10 in 5 sports
- Medals Ranked 32nd: Gold 1 Silver 1 Bronze 0 Total 2

World Games appearances
- 1981; 1985; 1989; 1993; 1997; 2001; 2005; 2009; 2013; 2017; 2022

Vietnam participated in the 2013 World Games in Cali, Colombia on 29 June – 6 July 2013.

Vietnam sent 10 athletes which competed in 5 sports.

== Medalists ==
Medal	Name	Sport	Event
Gold	Aerobic team	Aerobic	-
Silver	Nguyễn Hoàng Ngân	Karate	-
