= Japan at the 2013 World Games =

- IOC code: JPN

in Cali, Colombia 25 July 2013 – 4 August 2013
- Medals Ranked 12th: Gold 5 Silver 1 Bronze 4 Total 10

World Games appearances
- 1981; 1985; 1989; 1993; 1997; 2001; 2005; 2009; 2013; 2017; 2022; 2025

Japan competed at the 2013 World Games held in Cali, Colombia.

== Medalists ==
Medal	Name	Sport	Event
Gold	Ryutaro Araga	Karate	Men's kumite 84 kg
Gold	Kayo Someya	Karate	Women's kumite 68 kg
Gold	Yukina Iwamoto	Sumo	Women's lightweight
Gold	Tatsuma Kawaguchi	Sumo	Men's lightweight
Gold	Ayumi Uekusa	Karate	Women's kumite +68 kg
Silver	Toshiki Yasui	Water skiing	Men's freestyle wakeboard
Bronze	Ryo Kiyuna	Karate	Men's kata
Bronze	Yukako Fukushima	Powerlifting	Women's lightweight
Bronze	Mutoshi Matsunaga	Sumo	Men's heavyweight
Bronze	Asano Matsuura	Sumo	Women's middleweight

== Karate ==
In total, three gold medals and one bronze medal were won by Japanese karateka.

Ryutaro Araga won the gold medal in the men's kumite 84 kg event, Kayo Someya won the gold medal in the women's kumite 68 kg event and Ayumi Uekusa won the gold medal in the women's kumite +68 kg event. Ryo Kiyuna won the bronze medal in the men's kata event.

== Powerlifting ==
Yukako Fukushima won the bronze medal in the women's lightweight event.
