= Australia at the 2013 World Games =

- IOC code: AUS

in Cali, Colombia 25 July 2013 – 4 August 2013
- Medals: Gold 0 Silver 1 Bronze 3 Total 4

World Games appearances
- 1981; 1985; 1989; 1993; 1997; 2001; 2005; 2009; 2013; 2017; 2022

Australia competed at the 2013 World Games held in Cali, Colombia.

== Medallists ==
Medal	Name	Sport	Event
Silver	Australia	Flying disc	Flying disc tournament
Bronze	Tsuneari Yahiro	Karate	Men's kumite 67 kg
Bronze	Maria Alexiadis	Karate	Women's kumite 50 kg
Bronze	Michale Briant	Water skiing	Women's tricks

== Flying disc ==
Australia won the silver medal.

== Karate ==
Tsuneari Yahiro won the bronze medal in the men's kumite 67 kg event and Maria Alexiadis won the bronze medal in the women's kumite 50 kg event.

== Water skiing ==
Michale Briant won the bronze medal in the women's tricks event.
