= Ecuador at the 2013 World Games =

- IOC code: ECU

in Cali, Colombia 25 July 2013 – 4 August 2013
- Medals: Gold 0 Silver 1 Bronze 2 Total 3

World Games appearances
- 1981; 1985; 1989; 1993; 1997; 2001; 2005; 2009; 2013; 2017; 2022

Ecuador competed at the 2013 World Games held in Cali, Colombia.

== Medalists ==
Medal	Name	Sport	Event
Silver	Jacqueline Factos	Karate	Women's kumite 61 kg
Bronze	José Castillo	Powerlifting	Men's middleweight
Bronze	Jorge Bolaños	Road speed skating	Men's 20000 m elimination

== Karate ==
Jacqueline Factos won the silver medal in the women's kumite 61 kg event.

== Powerlifting ==
José Castillo won the bronze medal in the men's middleweight event.
