= Sergey Fedosienko =

Russian powerlifter (born 1982)

Personal information
- Born: 31 July 1982 (age 43) Krasnozyorskoye, Novosibirsk Oblast, Russia
- Height: 1.46 m (4 ft 9 in)
- Weight: 58.7 kg (129 lb)

Sport
- Country: Russia (2002–present)
- Sport: Powerlifting
- Event: 59 kg

Achievements and titles
- Personal bests: Equipped Squat: 300 kg (2014); Equipped Bench Press: 206 kg (2017); Equipped Deadlift: 273.5 kg (2018); Equipped Total: 765 kg (2019); Raw Squat: 245 kg (2022); Raw Bench Press: 177.5 kg (2016); Raw Deadlift: 275 kg (2020); Raw Total: 672.5 kg (2022)
Medal record
Representing Russia
World Games
Gold medal – first place	2013 Cali	Lightweight
Gold medal – first place	2017 Wrocław	Lightweight
Equipped Men's World championships
Gold medal – first place	2003 Vejle	52 kg
Gold medal – first place	2004 Cape Town	52 kg
Gold medal – first place	2007 Solden	56 kg
Gold medal – first place	2009 New Delhi	56 kg
Gold medal – first place	2010 Potchefstroom	56 kg
Gold medal – first place	2011 Plzeň	59 kg
Gold medal – first place	2012 Aguadilla	59 kg
Gold medal – first place	2013 Stavanger	59 kg
Gold medal – first place	2014 Aurora	59 kg
Gold medal – first place	2015 Hamm	59 kg
Gold medal – first place	2016 Orlando	59 kg
Gold medal – first place	2017 Plzeň	59 kg
Gold medal – first place	2018 Halmstad	59 kg
Gold medal – first place	2019 Dubai	59 kg
Gold medal – first place	2021 Stavanger	59 kg
Classic Men's World championships
Gold medal – first place	2012 Stockholm	59 kg
Gold medal – first place	2014 Johannesburg	59 kg
Gold medal – first place	2015 Salo	59 kg
Gold medal – first place	2016 Killeen	59 kg
Gold medal – first place	2017 Minsk	59 kg
Gold medal – first place	2018 Calgary	59 kg
Gold medal – first place	2019 Helsingborg	59 kg
Gold medal – first place	2021 Halmstad	59 kg

Sergey Alexeyevich Fedosienko (Russian: Сергей Алексеевич Федосиенко; born 31 July 1982) is a Russian powerlifter. Fedosienko has won 15 gold medals at the world equipped championships and 7 gold medals at the world classic (raw) championships in the IPF. Fedosienko has also won two World Games gold medals in 2013 and 2017.

Fedosienko is 1.46 metres, or 4'8", tall.

In 2005, Fedosienko failed a doping test and received a 2-year ban. He was stripped of his gold medal at the 2005 European Powerlifting Championships.

In 2022, Russia was banned from competing in the European and International Powerlifting Federations due to declaring war on Ukraine. Due to Fedosienko residing in Russia, this would end his 12-year streak as a world champion and be stripped from competing at the 2022 World Games.
