= Azerbaijan at the 2013 World Games =

- IOC code: AZE

in Cali, Colombia 25 July 2013 – 4 August 2013
- Medals: Gold 1 Silver 0 Bronze 1 Total 2

World Games appearances
- 1981; 1985; 1989; 1993; 1997; 2001; 2005; 2009; 2013; 2017; 2022

Azerbaijan competed at the 2013 World Games held in Cali, Colombia. In total, two medals were won, both in karate.

== Medalists ==
Medal	Name	Sport	Event
Gold	Rafael Aghayev	Karate	Men's kumite 75 kg
Bronze	Shahin Atamov	Karate	Men's kumite +84 kg

== Karate ==
Two medals were won in karate. Rafael Aghayev won the gold medal in the men's kumite 75 kg event and Shahin Atamov won the bronze medal in the men's kumite +84 kg event.
