= Jacqueline Factos =

Ecuadorian karateka

- Born: Jacqueline Andreas Factos Henao; April 20, 1985 (age 40); Quito, Ecuador
- Occupation: Karate athlete

Jacqueline Andrea Factos Henao (born April 20, 1985) is an Ecuadorian karate martial artist. When she was 19 she joined the Concentracion Deportiva de Pichincha where she is trained by Luis Valdivieso and became part of the National Karate Team.

== Biography ==
She was born in Quito, Ecuador on April 20, 1985. Her father was Ecuadorian and her mother was Colombian. At 19 years old she lived in Colombia; she then moved to Ecuador where she joined the Concentracion Deportiva de Pichincha. There, she was chosen to form part of the Ecuadorian Karate National Team. Growing up she practiced a variety of sports including track and field, powerlifting and speed skating before finding karate.

== Trophies ==
She participated in six Pan American Games finals and won 5. She won a silver medal in the World Games and a gold medal in the Kazakhstan Open in 2019.
