= Germany at the 2013 World Games =

- IOC code: GER

World Games appearances
- 1981; 1985; 1989; 1993; 1997; 2001; 2005; 2009; 2013; 2017; 2022; 2025

Germany competed at the 2013 World Games, held in Cali, Colombia.

== Medalists ==
Medal	Name	Sport	Event
Gold	Jonathan Horne	Karate	Men's kumite +84 kg
Silver	Elena Richter	Archery	Women's recurve
Silver	Noah Bitsch	Karate	Men's kumite 75 kg
Bronze	Paul Titscher; Kristina Berger	Archery	Mixed team compound

== Archery ==
Two medals were won in archery. Elena Richter won the silver medal in the women's recurve event. Paul Titscher and Kristina Berger won the bronze medal in the mixed team compound event.

== Karate ==
Two medals were won by German karateka. Jonathan Horne won the gold medal in the men's kumite +84 kg event and Noah Bitsch won the silver medal in the men's kumite 75 kg event.
