= Venezuela at the 2013 World Games =

- IOC code: VEN

in Cali, Colombia 25 July 2013 – 4 August 2013
- Medals: Gold 1 Silver 1 Bronze 2 Total 4

World Games appearances
- 1981; 1985; 1989; 1993; 1997; 2001; 2005; 2009; 2013; 2017; 2022; 2025

Venezuela competed at the 2013 World Games held in Cali, Colombia, from 25 July to 4 August 2013. The Venezuelan delegation included athletes in several sports, winning a total of 3 gold, 3 silver, and 3 bronze medals. Venezuela finished 17th in the overall medal table.

== Medalists ==
Venezuela won at least two medals in karate at the 2013 World Games.

Medal	Name	Sport	Event
Gold	Antonio Díaz	Karate	Men's kata
Silver	Ángel Aponte	Karate	Men's kumite +84 kg

== Karate ==
Two medals were won in karate. Antonio Díaz won the gold medal in the men's kata event and Ángel Aponte won the silver medal in the men's kumite +84 kg event.

== Swimming ==
Venezuelan swimmer Mónica González also competed at the 2013 World Games in Cali, Colombia. She participated in the swimming events, representing Venezuela in international aquatic sports.
