= Russia at the 2013 World Games =

- IOC code: RUS

World Games appearances (overview)
- 1981; 1985; 1989; 1993; 1997; 2001; 2005; 2009; 2013; 2017; 2022

Russia competed at the 2013 World Games held in Cali, Colombia.

== Medalists ==
Medal	Name	Sport	Event
Gold	Sergey Fedosienko	Powerlifting	Men's lightweight
Bronze	Olga Malofeeva	Karate	Women's kumite 61 kg

== Karate ==
Olga Malofeeva won the bronze medal in the women's kumite 61 kg event.

== Powerlifting ==
Three gold medals, two silver medals and two bronze medals were won.
