= Colombia at the 2013 World Games =

- IOC code: COL
- NOC: Colombian Olympic Committee
- Website: www.olimpicocol.co (in Spanish)

World Games appearances
- 1981; 1985; 1989; 1993; 1997; 2001; 2005; 2009; 2013; 2017; 2022

Host country Colombia competed at the 2013 World Games held in Cali, Colombia.

== Medalists ==
Medal	Name	Sport	Event
Gold	Andrés Rendón	Karate	Men's kumite 60 kg
Gold	José Ramírez	Karate	Men's kumite 67 kg
Gold	Lina Gómez	Karate	Women's kumite 61 kg
Silver	Ana Escandón	Karate	Women's kumite 68 kg
Bronze	Sara López	Archery	Women's compound

== Archery ==
Sara López won the bronze medal in the women's compound event.

== Karate ==
In total three gold medals and one silver medal were won by Colombian karateka.
