= 2013 World Games =

Multi-sport event in Cali, Colombia

World Games IX IX Juegos Mundiales
- Host city: Cali, Colombia
- Motto: Fair play to the planet
- Nations: 103
- Athletes: 2,982
- Events: 171 in 31 official sports
- Opening: 25 July 2013
- Closing: 4 August 2013
- Opened by: Vice President Angelino Garzón
- Athlete's Oath: Jorge Luis CiFuentes
- Judge's Oath: Marta Luz Vega
- Coach's Oath: Hugo Cotuaz
- Main venue: Estadio Olímpico Pascual Guerrero
- Website: worldgames2013.com.co (archived)

The 2013 World Games (Spanish: Juegos Mundiales 2013), the ninth World Games, also known as Cali 2013, were an international multi-sport event held in the city of Cali, Colombia, from July 25 to August 4. It is the first edition of the World Games to be held in South America.

== Host city allocation history ==
The 2013 World Games were initially allocated to the German cities of Duisburg and Düsseldorf. However, at the end of 2008, Duisburg withdrew and Düsseldorf dropped out because both cities could not secure enough funding, partly as a result of the 2008 financial crisis and the subsequent Great Recession.

Two alternate cities came forward to the IWGA to bid for these Games: Pretoria, South Africa and Cali, Colombia. During The World Games 2009 in Kaohsiung, Chinese Taipei, the IWGA announced that Cali has won the right to host The World Games in 2013.

== Sports ==
=== Official sports ===
The 2013 World Games programme featured 32 official sports, and 4 invitational sports. The numbers in parentheses indicate the number of medal events, which were contested in each sports discipline.

- Acrobatic gymnastics (5)
- Aerobic gymnastics (7)
- Air sports (3)
- Archery (7)
- Artistic roller skating (4)
- Beach handball (2)
- Boules sports (8)
- Bowling (3)
- Canoe polo (2)
- Cue sports (4)
- Dancesport (3)
- Finswimming (10)
- Fistball (1)
- Flying disc (1)
- Inline hockey (1)
- Inline speed skating (10)
- Ju-jitsu (13)
- Karate (12)
- Korfball (1)
- Lifesaving (16)
- Orienteering (5)
- Powerlifting (8)
- Racquetball (2)
- Rhythmic gymnastics (3)
- Road speed skating (8)
- Rugby sevens (1)
- Sport climbing (4)
- Squash (2)
- Sumo (8)
- Trampoline gymnastics (6)
- Tug of war (3)
- Water skiing (8)

=== Invitational sports ===
- Canoe marathon (6)
- Duathlon (2)
- Softball (1)
- Wushu (14)

== Garden of Sport ==
The "Garden of Sport" events were held in the neighboring towns of Buga and Jamundí. These demonstration events served to showcase these disciplines for potential inclusion in future games.

Two of the competitions were held at Coliseo Mayor in Buga:

- Futsal (AMF rules)
- Kudo, men's and women's.

The other three disciplines took place in Jamundí:

- Coliseo Alfaguara y Plaza Mayor - Wallball and Frontball
- Estadio El Cacique - Hapkido

== Calendar ==
- 2013 World Games Event Schedule
- Note: Due to concerns about temperature and air flow at the Del Pueblo Gymnasium, where the sport of Rhythmic Gymnastics was taking place, the Ribbons event was cancelled at the last moment.

Key: Invitational sport

| OC | Opening ceremony | ● | Event competitions | 1 | Event finals | CC | Closing ceremony |

| July/August 2013 | 25th Thu | 26th Fri | 27th Sat | 28th Sun | 29th Mon | 30th Tue | 31st Wed | 1st Thu | 2nd Fri | 3rd Sat | 4th Sun | Gold medals |
|---|---|---|---|---|---|---|---|---|---|---|---|---|
| Ceremonies | OC | | | | | | | | | | CC | |
| Acrobatic gymnastics | | | | ● | 2 | 2 | 1 | | | | | 5 |
| Aerobic gymnastics | | | | | | | | ● | 3 | 4 | | 7 |
| Air sports | | | | | | ● | ● | ● | ● | ● | 3 | 3 |
| Artistic roller skating | ● | ● | 4 | | | | | | | | | 4 |
| Beach handball | | | | | | | | ● | ● | ● | 2 | 2 |
| Billiard sports | ● | ● | ● | ● | ● | 4 | | | | | | 4 |
| Boules sports | | | | ● | ● | ● | 8 | | | | | 8 |
| Bowling | | | | | | | ● | 1 | ● | ● | 2 | 3 |
| Canoe polo | | | | | | | | ● | ● | 2 | | 2 |
| Dancesport | | ● | 1 | 2 | | | | | | | | 3 |
| Field archery | | ● | ● | 3 | ● | ● | ● | 4 | | | | 7 |
| Finswimming | ● | 5 | 5 | | | | | | | | | 10 |
| Fistball | | | | | | | ● | ● | ● | ● | 1 | 1 |
| Flying disc | | | ● | ● | ● | 1 | | | | | | 1 |
| Ju-jitsu | | | | ● | 7 | 6 | | | | | | 13 |
| Karate | ● | 6 | 6 | | | | | | | | | 12 |
| Korfball | | | | | | ● | ● | ● | ● | ● | 1 | 1 |
| Lifesaving | ● | 8 | 8 | | | | | | | | | 16 |
| Orienteering | | | | | | | | ● | 2 | 2 | 1 | 5 |
| Powerlifting | | | | | ● | 3 | 3 | 2 | | | | 8 |
| Racquetball | | ● | ● | 2 | | | | | | | | 2 |
| Road speed skating | | | | | | | | | | 4 | 4 | 8 |
| Rhythmic gymnastics | ● | 2 | 1 | | | | | | | | | 3 |
| Roller inline hockey | ● | ● | ● | ● | ● | 1 | | | | | | 1 |
| Rugby sevens | | | | | | | ● | ● | 1 | | | 1 |
| Track speed skating | | | | | | ● | 2 | 4 | 4 | | | 10 |
| Sport climbing | | | | | | | | | | 2 | 2 | 4 |
| Squash | | | | | | | | ● | ● | ● | 2 | 2 |
| Sumo | ● | 6 | 2 | | | | | | | | | 8 |
| Trampoline gymnastics | | | | ● | 1 | | 3 | | | | | 4 |
| Tug of war | | ● | 1 | 2 | | | | | | | | 3 |
| Tumbling gymnastics | | | | ● | | 2 | | | | | | 2 |
| Waterskiing and Wakeboarding | ● | ● | ● | 4 | 4 | | | | | | | 8 |
| Total gold medals | | 27 | 28 | 13 | 14 | 19 | 17 | 11 | 10 | 14 | 18 | 171 |
| July/August 2013 | 25th Thu | 26th Fri | 27th Sat | 28th Sun | 29th Mon | 30th Tue | 31st Wed | 1st Thu | 2nd Fri | 3rd Sat | 4th Sun | Gold medals |
| Canoe marathon | | | | | | | | 3 | 3 | | | 6 |
| Duathlon | ● | 1 | 1 | | | | | | | | | 2 |
| Softball | ● | ● | ● | ● | ● | 1 | | | | | | 1 |
| Wushu (Note: Although originally scheduled, apparently no medals were awarded in wushu for the Men's Gunshu and Women's Qiangshu events.) | | | | | | | | | 6 | 2 | 6 | 14 |
| Total gold medals | | 1 | 1 | | | 1 | | 3 | 9 | 2 | 6 | 23 |
| Grand total of gold medals | | 28 | 29 | 13 | 14 | 20 | 17 | 14 | 19 | 16 | 24 | 194 |

== Participant countries ==
Parade of nations at the opening ceremony of the World Games in Cali 2013

- 2013 World Games participant countries (with number of athletes):
- Afghanistan (1)
- Algeria (2)
- Argentina (65)
- Aruba (15)
- Australia (87)
- Austria (44)
- Azerbaijan (5)
- Belarus (15)
- Belgium (59)
- Bermuda (1)
- Bolivia (4)
- Brazil (74)
- Bulgaria (6)
- Canada (90)
- Chile (42)
- China (105)
- Colombia (204) Host
- Costa Rica (8)
- Croatia (18)
- Cuba (19)
- Czech Republic (71)
- Denmark (16)
- Dominican Republic (7)
- Ecuador (16)
- Egypt (17)
- El Salvador (2)
- Estonia (7)
- Ethiopia (1)
- Finland (10)
- France (157)
- Germany (146)
- Greece (2)
- Guatemala (4)
- Guyana (1)
- Hong Kong (13)
- Hungary (53)
- India (12)
- Indonesia (8)
- Iran (17)
- Ireland (26)
- Israel (11)
- Italy (102)
- Jamaica (1)
- Japan (76)
- Jordan (1)
- Kazakhstan (2)
- South Korea (45)
- Kuwait (1)
- Latvia (35)
- Lithuania (8)
- Luxembourg (2)
- Macau (1)
- Macedonia (1)
- Malaysia (13)
- Malta (3)
- Mauritius (1)
- Mexico (37)
- Moldova (2)
- Monaco (3)
- Mongolia (18)
- Montenegro (3)
- Morocco (3)
- Namibia (1)
- Netherlands (78)
- New Zealand (24)
- Nicaragua (2)
- Norway (28)
- Pakistan (1)
- Peru (3)
- Philippines (5)
- Poland (33)
- Portugal (36)
- Puerto Rico (3)
- Qatar (10)
- Romania (12)
- Russia (149)
- Senegal (1)
- Serbia (4)
- Singapore (2)
- Slovakia (17)
- Slovenia (10)
- South Africa (41)
- Spain (37)
- Sweden (52)
- Switzerland (77)
- Syria (1)
- Chinese Taipei (51)
- Thailand (11)
- Trinidad and Tobago (6)
- Tunisia (10)
- Turkey (8)
- Ukraine (90)
- United Arab Emirates (2)
- United Kingdom (102)
- United States (137)
- Uruguay (24)
- Venezuela (88)
- Vietnam (9)

== Medal mistake ==
This particular edition made the mistake of putting the words "word games" instead of "world games," on one thousand medals. This fact was reported by Colombian news organization Noticias Uno. Several athletes smiled and were surprised upon seeing the typo. According to the representative of the firm that engraved the medals, several authorities had seen and approved the medals' design without noticing the mistake, including Coldeportes director Andrés Botero, and the head of the Organizing Committee Rodrigo Otoya. The representative also stated that, according to a corporate policy, "... any mistake after the art has been approved (by the client) will not be responsibility of the Firm" Regarding the medals, Rodrigo Guerrero, Mayor of Cali, stated that "This mistake in no way undermines the value of the medals, and the spirit of the games. People are making a tempest in a tea cup out of this situation."

== Medal results ==
=== Official sports ===
Key: Medal tally of the 2013 World Games' Official Results website, which includes road speed skating. In one aerobic gymnastics event there was a four-way tie for first place; four gold medals and no silver or bronze medals were awarded. In another aerobic gymnastics event there was a tie for second-place; two silver medals and no bronze medal were awarded. In two trampoline/tumbing gymnastics events, there was tie for first-place; in each event, two gold medals and no silver medal were awarded.

* Host nation (Colombia)

| Rank | Nation | Gold | Silver | Bronze | Total |
|---|---|---|---|---|---|
| 1 | Italy (ITA) | 18 | 13 | 18 | 49 |
| 2 | Russia (RUS) | 17 | 24 | 12 | 53 |
| 3 | France (FRA) | 16 | 11 | 13 | 40 |
| 4 | Germany (GER) | 15 | 7 | 8 | 30 |
| 5 | China (CHN) | 14 | 6 | 2 | 22 |
| 6 | United States (USA) | 11 | 4 | 4 | 19 |
| 7 | Ukraine (UKR) | 9 | 10 | 9 | 28 |
| 8 | Colombia (COL)* | 8 | 13 | 10 | 31 |
| 9 | Great Britain (GBR) | 6 | 6 | 3 | 15 |
| 10 | Chinese Taipei (TPE) | 5 | 5 | 8 | 18 |
| 11 | Brazil (BRA) | 5 | 3 | 1 | 9 |
| 12 | Japan (JPN) | 5 | 1 | 4 | 10 |
| 13 | Switzerland (SUI) | 4 | 4 | 0 | 8 |
| 14 | Denmark (DEN) | 3 | 2 | 2 | 7 |
| 15 | Sweden (SWE) | 3 | 1 | 5 | 9 |
| 16 | Belarus (BLR) | 3 | 1 | 3 | 7 |
| 16 | Mexico (MEX) | 3 | 1 | 3 | 7 |
| 18 | Netherlands (NED) | 2 | 6 | 5 | 13 |
| 19 | Belgium (BEL) | 2 | 4 | 4 | 10 |
| 20 | Spain (ESP) | 2 | 4 | 2 | 8 |
| 21 | Chile (CHI) | 2 | 3 | 0 | 5 |
| 21 | Poland (POL) | 2 | 3 | 0 | 5 |
| 21 | Romania (ROU) | 2 | 3 | 0 | 5 |
| 24 | Slovenia (SLO) | 2 | 1 | 0 | 3 |
| 25 | Finland (FIN) | 2 | 0 | 0 | 2 |
| 26 | South Korea (KOR) | 1 | 2 | 6 | 9 |
| 27 | Austria (AUT) | 1 | 2 | 3 | 6 |
| 28 | New Zealand (NZL) | 1 | 2 | 0 | 3 |
| 29 | Croatia (CRO) | 1 | 1 | 2 | 4 |
| 29 | Venezuela (VEN) | 1 | 1 | 2 | 4 |
| 31 | Hungary (HUN) | 1 | 1 | 0 | 2 |
| 31 | Vietnam (VIE) | 1 | 1 | 0 | 2 |
| 33 | South Africa (RSA) | 1 | 0 | 3 | 4 |
| 34 | Mongolia (MGL) | 1 | 0 | 2 | 3 |
| 35 | Azerbaijan (AZE) | 1 | 0 | 1 | 2 |
| 35 | Lithuania (LTU) | 1 | 0 | 1 | 2 |
| 37 | India (IND) | 1 | 0 | 0 | 1 |
| 37 | Malaysia (MAS) | 1 | 0 | 0 | 1 |
| 37 | Moldova (MDA) | 1 | 0 | 0 | 1 |
| 37 | Turkey (TUR) | 1 | 0 | 0 | 1 |
| 41 | Canada (CAN) | 0 | 3 | 6 | 9 |
| 42 | Norway (NOR) | 0 | 3 | 4 | 7 |
| 43 | Argentina (ARG) | 0 | 3 | 2 | 5 |
| 43 | Egypt (EGY) | 0 | 3 | 2 | 5 |
| 43 | Thailand (THA) | 0 | 3 | 2 | 5 |
| 46 | Czech Republic (CZE) | 0 | 2 | 1 | 3 |
| 47 | Australia (AUS) | 0 | 1 | 3 | 4 |
| 48 | Ecuador (ECU) | 0 | 1 | 2 | 3 |
| 48 | Portugal (POR) | 0 | 1 | 2 | 3 |
| 50 | Greece (GRE) | 0 | 1 | 1 | 2 |
| 50 | Iran (IRI) | 0 | 1 | 1 | 2 |
| 52 | Luxembourg (LUX) | 0 | 1 | 0 | 1 |
| 53 | El Salvador (ESA) | 0 | 0 | 1 | 1 |
| 53 | Ireland (IRL) | 0 | 0 | 1 | 1 |
| 53 | Israel (ISR) | 0 | 0 | 1 | 1 |
| 53 | Morocco (MAR) | 0 | 0 | 1 | 1 |
| 53 | Peru (PER) | 0 | 0 | 1 | 1 |
| 53 | Philippines (PHI) | 0 | 0 | 1 | 1 |
| 53 | Serbia (SRB) | 0 | 0 | 1 | 1 |
| Totals (59 entries) | | 176 | 169 | 169 | 514 |

=== Invitational sports ===
Key: As of August 3, 2013, from the Games' official Invitational Sports Medal Tally.

* Host nation (Colombia)

| Rank | Nation | Gold | Silver | Bronze | Total |
|---|---|---|---|---|---|
| 1 | Hungary (HUN) | 5 | 2 | 0 | 7 |
| 2 | China (CHN) | 5 | 1 | 1 | 7 |
| 3 | Iran (IRI) | 4 | 0 | 0 | 4 |
| 4 | France (FRA) | 1 | 3 | 2 | 6 |
| 5 | Vietnam (VIE) | 1 | 2 | 0 | 3 |
| 6 | Germany (GER) | 1 | 0 | 2 | 3 |
| 7 | Japan (JPN) | 1 | 0 | 1 | 2 |
| 7 | United States (USA) | 1 | 0 | 1 | 2 |
| 9 | Belgium (BEL) | 1 | 0 | 0 | 1 |
| 9 | Cuba (CUB) | 1 | 0 | 0 | 1 |
| 9 | Hong Kong (HKG) | 1 | 0 | 0 | 1 |
| 9 | Indonesia (INA) | 1 | 0 | 0 | 1 |
| 13 | Malaysia (MAS) | 0 | 2 | 2 | 4 |
| 14 | Russia (RUS) | 0 | 2 | 0 | 2 |
| 15 | Italy (ITA) | 0 | 1 | 1 | 2 |
| 15 | Portugal (POR) | 0 | 1 | 1 | 2 |
| 15 | Turkey (TUR) | 0 | 1 | 1 | 2 |
| 15 | Ukraine (UKR) | 0 | 1 | 1 | 2 |
| 19 | Brazil (BRA) | 0 | 1 | 0 | 1 |
| 19 | Canada (CAN) | 0 | 1 | 0 | 1 |
| 19 | Chile (CHI) | 0 | 1 | 0 | 1 |
| 19 | Czech Republic (CZE) | 0 | 1 | 0 | 1 |
| 19 | India (IND) | 0 | 1 | 0 | 1 |
| 19 | Spain (ESP) | 0 | 1 | 0 | 1 |
| 19 | Venezuela (VEN) | 0 | 1 | 0 | 1 |
| 26 | Argentina (ARG) | 0 | 0 | 1 | 1 |
| 26 | Colombia (COL)* | 0 | 0 | 1 | 1 |
| 26 | Mexico (MEX) | 0 | 0 | 1 | 1 |
| 26 | Netherlands (NED) | 0 | 0 | 1 | 1 |
| 26 | Poland (POL) | 0 | 0 | 1 | 1 |
| Totals (30 entries) | | 23 | 23 | 18 | 64 |

== Changes in medal tally ==
Key

Disqualified athlete(s)

| Sport/Event | Athlete (NOC) | Gold | Silver | Bronze | Total |
|---|---|---|---|---|---|
| Sumo; Men's middleweight | (Hungary) István Kalmár (HUN) | | –1 | | –1 |
| Sumo; Men's middleweight | (Russia) Atsamaz Kaziev (RUS) | | +1 | –1 | 0 |
| Sumo; Men's middleweight | (Mongolia) Usukhbayar Ochirkhuu (MGL) | | | +1 | +1 |

In the men's middleweight sumo event, István Kalmár of Hungary was stripped of his silver medal due to a positive doping test.

== Broadcasters ==
=== Host broadcaster ===
- Señal Colombia

=== International Broadcasters ===
- (Brazil) TV Esporte Interativo and ESPN Brasil
- (Vietnam) VTV
- (Japan) NHK
- Fox Sports (Australia)
- (United States) ESPN
- (Czech Republic) Czech Television
- China Central Television
- (Hong Kong) (Singapore) (Indonesia) (Philippines) (Malaysia) (Brunei) (South Korea) (Vietnam) (Thailand) (Taiwan) STAR Sports Fox Sports Plus HD
