= Sport climbing at the 2013 World Games – Men's lead =

Sport climbing - Men's Lead at the 2013 World Games
- Venue: Velodrome Exterior, Cali, Colombia
- Dates: 4 August 2013
- Competitors: 17 from 14 nations

Medalists
gold medal	(Spain) Ramón Julián Puigblanqué
silver medal	(Austria) Jakob Schubert
bronze medal	(Norway) Magnus Midtbø

The men's lead competition in sport climbing at the 2013 World Games took place on 4 August 2013 at the Velodrome Exterior in Cali, Colombia.

== Competition format ==
A total of 17 athletes entered the competition. Top 8 climbers from semifinal qualifies to the final.

== Results ==
=== Semifinal ===
Rank	Athlete	Nation	Height	Note
1	Ramón Julián Puigblanqué	Spain	45+	Q
1	Jakob Schubert	Austria	45+	Q
3	Sean McColl	Canada	45	Q
4	Magnus Midtbø	Norway	44+	Q
5	Stefano Ghisolfi	Italy	42	Q
6	Domen Škofic	Slovenia	39+	Q
7	Min Hyun-bin	South Korea	34+	Q
7	Romain Desgranges	France	34+	Q
9	Sebastian Halenke	Germany	31+	
10	Manuel Romain	France	26+	
11	Dmitry Fakiryanov	Russia	26	
11	Mario Lechner	Austria	26	
13	Facundo Langbehn	Chile	24	
14	Joseph Gifford	United States	18+	
15	Manuel Escobar	Venezuela	15+	
15	Reinaldo Camacho	Venezuela	15+	
17	Juan Arboleda	Colombia	14+	

=== Final ===
Rank	Athlete	Nation	Height
1st place, gold medalist(s)	Ramón Julián Puigblanqué	Spain	48+
2nd place, silver medalist(s)	Jakob Schubert	Austria	47+
3rd place, bronze medalist(s)	Magnus Midtbø	Norway	47+
4	Min Hyun-bin	South Korea	47+
5	Sean McColl	Canada	46+
6	Romain Desgranges	France	46+
7	Stefano Ghisolfi	Italy	41+
8	Domen Škofic	Slovenia	41
