= Lifesaving at the World Games =

Lifesaving was introduced as a World Games sport at the 1985 World Games in London.

== Medalists ==
=== Men ===
==== 50 m Manikin Carry ====
Games	Gold	Silver	Bronze
1985 London	Roberto Bonnani; Italy	Mauro Bertolini; Italy	Massimiliano Tramontana; Great Britain
1989 Karlsruhe	Pietro Voltan; Italy	Marcello Saporiti; Italy	Yuriy Dudnikov; Soviet Union
1993 The Hague	Marcello Saporiti; Italy	Fabrizio Caratti; Italy	Andreas Fischer; Germany
1997 Lahti	Gianluca Landori; Italy	Tarik Börner; Germany	Thorsten Laurent; Germany
2001 Akita	Pablo Terradillos; Spain	Jason O'Pray; Australia	Stephen Short; Australia
2005 Duisburg	Hagen Leditschke; Germany	Mauro LocchI; Italy	Fernando del Villar; Spain
2009 Kaohsiung	Federico Pinotti; Italy	Florian Laclaustra; France	Giovanni Legnani; Italy
2013 Cali	Stefano Costamagna; Italy	Federico Pinotti; Italy	David Marais; South Africa
2017 Wrocław	Danny Wieck; Germany	Joshua Perling; Germany	Bradley Woodward; Australia
2022 Birmingham	Danny Wieck; Germany	Francesco Ippolito; Italy	Joshua Perling; Germany
2025 Chengdu	Fergus Eadie; New Zealand	Kacper Majchrzak; Poland	Francesco Ippolito; Italy

==== 100 m Manikin Carry with Fins ====
Games	Gold	Silver	Bronze
1985 London	Roberto Bonnani; Italy	Francesco Sennis; Italy	Frank Regel; West Germany
1989 Karlsruhe	Mauro Bertolini; Italy	Pietro Voltan; Italy	Walter Verberght; Belgium
1993 The Hague	Klaus Hermes; Germany	Burkhard Hole; Germany	Wolfgang Resch; Germany
1997 Lahti	Alessandra Giraldo; Italy	Carsten Schlepphorst; Germany	Federico Mastrostefano; Italy
2001 Akita	Jason O'Pray; Australia	Maik Hofmann; Germany	Matthew Bouman; South Africa
2005 Duisburg	Nicola Ferrua; Italy	Carsten Schlepphorst; Germany	Graeme Willcox; South Africa
2009 Kaohsiung	Simone Procaccia; Italy	Zhang Jiawen; China	Nicola Ferrua; Italy
2013 Cali	Francesco Bonanni; Italy	Stefano Costamagna; Italy	Anil Sezen; Germany
2017 Wrocław	Jacopo Musso; Italy	Andrea Vittorio Piroddi; Italy	Kevin Lehr; Germany
2022 Birmingham	Jan Malkowski; Germany	Fabio Pezzotti; Italy	Tim Brang; Germany
2025 Chengdu	Tom Durager; France	Davide Cremonini; Italy	Fergus Eadie; New Zealand

==== 100 m Manikin Tow with Fins ====
Games	Gold	Silver	Bronze
2013 Cali	Marcel Hassemeier; Germany	Anil Sezen; Germany	Francesco Bonanni; Italy
2017 Wrocław	Jacopo Musso; Italy	Kevin Lehr; Germany	Samuel Bell; Australia
2022 Birmingham	Tim Brang; Germany	Javier Catalá; Spain	Alberto Turrado; Spain
2025 Chengdu	Davide Cremonini; Italy	Mathieu Perillon; France	Fabio Pezzotti; Italy

==== 100 m Rescue Medley ====
Games	Gold	Silver	Bronze
1985 London	Mauro Bertolini; Italy	Francesco Sennis; Italy	Roberto Bonnani; Italy
1989 Karlsruhe	Pietro Voltan; Italy	Marcello Saporiti; Italy	Pierre-Charles Cocu; France
1993 The Hague	Marcello Saporiti; Italy	Fabrizio Caratti; Italy	Andreas Fischer; Germany
1997 Lahti	Tarik Börner; Germany	Federico Mastrostefano; Italy	Gianluca Landori; Italy
2001 Akita	Lutz Heimann; Germany	Jason O'Pray; Australia	Stephen Short; Australia
2005 Duisburg	Guillem Riand; France	Fernando del Villar; Spain	Sören Borch; Germany
2009 Kaohsiung	Federico Pinotti; Italy	Giovanni Legnani; Italy	Andrew Bowden; Australia

==== 200 m Obstacle Swim ====
Games	Gold	Silver	Bronze
1985 London	Roberto Bonnani; Italy	Manfred Köder; West Germany	Miguel Cruz; Spain
1989 Karlsruhe	Manfred Köder; West Germany	Pierre-Charles Cocu; France	Pietro Voltan; Italy
1993 The Hague	Bart Reymen; Belgium	Burkhard Hole; Germany	Maurizio Gentili; Italy
1997 Lahti	Bart Reymen; Belgium	Hans Bijlemans; Belgium	Alessandra Giraldo; Italy
2001 Akita	Roel Jansen; Belgium	Stephen Short; Australia	Germano Proietti; Italy
2005 Duisburg	Pierre-Yves Romanini; Belgium	Lutz Heimann; Germany	Guillem Riand; France
2009 Kaohsiung	Zhang Enjian; China	Federico Pinotti; Italy	Benjamin Bilski; Germany
2013 Cali	Federico Pinotti; Italy	Thomas Vilaceca; France	Paul van Achterbergh; South Africa
2017 Wrocław	Bradley Woodward; Australia	Federico Gilardi; Italy	Steven Kent; New Zealand
2022 Birmingham	Andreas Hansen; Denmark	Francesco Ippolito; Italy	Enzo Nardozza; Italy

==== 200 m Super Lifesaver ====
Games	Gold	Silver	Bronze
2013 Cali	Marcel Hassemeier (GER)	Federico Pinotti (ITA)	Thomas Vilaceca (FRA)
2017 Wrocław	Daniele Sanna (ITA)	Federico Gilardi (ITA)	Tom Montgomery (AUS)

==== 4 x 25 m Manikin Relay ====
Games	Gold	Silver	Bronze
1989 Karlsruhe	Italy (ITA)	Soviet Union (URS)	West Germany (FRG)
1993 The Hague	Italy (ITA)	Germany (GER)	Sweden (SWE)
1997 Lahti	Italy (ITA)	Germany (GER)	Spain (ESP)
2013 Cali	Germany (GER)	Italy (ITA)	South Africa (RSA)
2017 Wrocław	Germany (GER)	Poland (POL)	Spain (ESP)

==== 4 x 50 m Medley Relay ====
Games	Gold	Silver	Bronze
1985 London	Italy (ITA)	Spain (ESP)	West Germany (FRG)
1989 Karlsruhe	Italy (ITA)	Soviet Union (URS)	West Germany (FRG)
1993 The Hague	Germany (GER)	Italy (ITA)	Spain (ESP)
1997 Lahti	Italy (ITA)	Germany (GER)	France (FRA)
2013 Cali	France (FRA)	Germany (GER)	Italy (ITA)
2017 Wrocław	Italy (ITA)	Australia (AUS)	Germany (GER)

==== 4 x 50 m Obstacle Relay ====
Games	Gold	Silver	Bronze
2013 Cali	Germany (GER)	Italy (ITA)	France (FRA)
2017 Wrocław	Japan (JPN)	Poland (POL)	France (FRA)

==== 4 x 50 m Rescue Tube Relay ====
Games	Gold	Silver	Bronze
1989 Karlsruhe	West Germany (FRG)	Soviet Union (URS)	Italy (ITA)
1993 The Hague	Italy (ITA)	Germany (GER)	Belgium (BEL)
1997 Lahti	Belgium (BEL)	Italy (ITA)	France (FRA)

==== 2 x 2 m Rescue Ball Relay ====
Games	Gold	Silver	Bronze
1993 The Hague	Sweden (SWE)	South Africa (RSA)	Great Britain (GBR)
1997 Lahti	Germany (GER)	Netherlands (NED)	South Africa (RSA)

==== Beach Flags ====
Games	Gold	Silver	Bronze
2001 Akita	Sergio Gonzalez de Leon; Australia	Waleed Damon; South Africa	Hidenobu Tadano; Japan

==== Board Race ====
Games	Gold	Silver	Bronze
2001 Akita	Zane Holmes; Australia	Ryan Butcher; South Africa	Matthew Bouman; South Africa
2005 Duisburg	Nathan Smith; Australia	Zane Holmes; Australia	Ryan Brennan; South Africa
2009 Kaohsiung	Daniel Moodie; New Zealand	Hugh Dougherty; Australia	Shannon Eckstein; Australia

==== Oceanman ====
Games	Gold	Silver	Bronze
2005 Duisburg	Zane Holmes; Australia	Nathan Smith; Australia	Paul Dias; South Africa
2009 Kaohsiung	Shannon Eckstein; Australia	Hugh Dougherty; Australia	Ryan Brennan; South Africa

==== Surf Race ====
Games	Gold	Silver	Bronze
2001 Akita	Zane Holmes; Australia	Matthew Bouman; South Africa	Germano Proietti; Italy
2005 Duisburg	Nathan Smith; Australia	Massimiliano Eroli; Italy	Pierre-Yves Romanini; Belgium
2009 Kaohsiung	Chris Allum; Australia	Glenn Anderson; New Zealand	Federico Pinotti; Italy

==== Overall Team ====
Note: (Note: In 2001, the overall team event combined results in these five non-medal events to determine the final ranking: 4x50m obstacle relay, 4x25m manikin carry, 4x50m rescue tube relay, rescue tube race and board rescue race. In 2005 and 2009, the overall team event combined results in these five non-medal events to determine the final ranking: 4x50m obstacle relay, 4x25m manikin carry, 4x50m medley relay, rescue tube race and board rescue race)

Games	Gold	Silver	Bronze
2001 Akita	South Africa (RSA)	Australia (AUS)	Germany (GER)
2005 Duisburg	Germany (GER)	Spain (ESP)	Italy (ITA)
2009 Kaohsiung	Italy (ITA)	Australia (AUS); New Zealand (NZL)	Not awarded

=== Women ===
==== 50 m Manikin Carry ====
Games	Gold	Silver	Bronze
1985 London	Monica Negro (ITA)	Cristina Bartocci (ITA)	Angela Cantelli (ITA)
1989 Karlsruhe	Natalya Gusovskaya (URS)	Antje Hole (FRG)	Svetlana Royanova (URS)
1993 The Hague	Carmen Geissler (GER)	Tiziana Molfini (ITA)	Jolanda van Dalen (NED)
1997 Lahti	Cristina Bianconi (ITA)	Anne Lühn (GER)	Monique Driessen (NED)
2001 Akita	Leigh Habler (AUS)	Aurélie Goffin (BEL)	Isabella Cerquozzi (ITA)
2005 Duisburg	Elena Prelle (ITA)	Monique Driessen (NED)	Jennifer Parry (AUS)
2009 Kaohsiung	Isabella Cerquozzi (ITA)	Gao Yuting (CHN)	He Qian (CHN)
2013 Cali	Magalie Rousseau (FRA)	Emmanuelle Bescheron (FRA)	Bieke Vandenabeele (BEL)
2017 Wrocław	Wu Huimin (CHN)	Mariah Jones (AUS)	Cristina Leanza (ITA)

==== 100 m Manikin Carry with Fins ====
Games	Gold	Silver	Bronze
1985 London	Concepcion Escattlar (ESP)	Birgit Ramisch (FRG)	Cristina Furlan (ITA)
1989 Karlsruhe	Yelena Novojilova (URS)	Concepcion Escatllar (ESP)	Bettina Lange (FRG)
1993 The Hague	Carmen Geissler (GER)	Bettina Lange (GER)	Christine Hole (GER)
1997 Lahti	Anne Lühn (GER)	Monique Driessen (NED)	Deborah Robinson (RSA)
2001 Akita	Paola Zago (ITA)	Marcella Prandi (ITA)	Alexandra Berlin (GER)
2005 Duisburg	Katja Popke (GER)	Monique Driessen (NED)	Sandra Temmerman (NED)
2009 Kaohsiung	Song Jianrong (CHN)	Huang Jiefen (CHN)	Marcella Prandi (ITA)
2013 Cali	Marta Mozzanica (ITA)	Anneloes Peulen (NED)	Marcella Prandi (ITA)
2017 Wrocław	Pamela Hendry (AUS)	Justine Weyders (FRA)	Federica Volpini (ITA)

==== 100 m Manikin Tow with Fins ====
Games	Gold	Silver	Bronze
2013 Cali	Justine Weyders (FRA)	Maria Luengas (ESP)	Maike Op het Veld (NED)
2017 Wrocław	Justine Weyders (FRA)	Federica Volpini (ITA)	Pamela Hendry (AUS)

==== 100 m Rescue Medley ====
Games	Gold	Silver	Bronze
1985 London	Monica Negro; Italy	Angela Cantelli; Italy	Jutta Ramisch; West Germany
1989 Karlsruhe	Antje Hole; West Germany	Christina Bernardini; Italy	Natalya Gusovskaya; Soviet Union
1993 The Hague	Cari Johansson; Sweden	Carmen Geissler; Germany	Bettina Lange; Germany
1997 Lahti	Cristina Bianconi; Italy	Wiebke Reit; Germany	Anne Lühn; Germany
2001 Akita	Leigh Habler; Australia	Jana Pescheck; Germany	Aurélie Goffin; Belgium
2005 Duisburg	Jennifer Parry; Australia	Elena Prelle; Italy	Alexandra Bannon; Australia
2009 Kaohsiung	Gao Yuting; China	Sarah Windsor; Australia	He Qian; China

==== 200 m Obstacle Swim ====
Games	Gold	Silver	Bronze
1985 London	Angela Cantelli (ITA)	Francisca Romero (ESP)	Cristina Furlan (ITA)
1989 Karlsruhe	Christina Bernardini (ITA)	Yelena Novoyilova (URS)	Sigrid Huygen (BEL)
1993 The Hague	Melanie Mohnke (GER)	Christina Bernardini (ITA)	Christine Hole (GER)
1997 Lahti	Annika Morin (SWE)	Cornelia Carl (GER)	Carolina Beneyto (ESP)
2001 Akita	Kate Krywulycz (AUS)	Bieke Vandenabeele (BEL)	Stacey Bowley (RSA)
2005 Duisburg	Erica Buratto (ITA)	Sarah Windsor (AUS)	Bieke Vandenabeele (BEL)
2009 Kaohsiung	Lu Ying (CHN)	Yang Jieqiao (CHN)	Yang Chin-kuei (TPE)
2013 Cali	Silvia Meschiari (ITA)	Zheng Rongrong (CHN)	Magalie Rousseau (FRA)
2017 Wrocław	Silvia Meschiari (ITA)	Alicja Tchórz (POL)	Margaux Fabre (FRA)

==== 200 m Super Lifesaver ====
Games	Gold	Silver	Bronze
2013 Cali	Magalie Rousseau (FRA)	Chiara Pidello (ITA)	Laura Pranzo (ITA)
2017 Wrocław	Silvia Meschiari (ITA)	Prue Davies (AUS)	Mariah Jones (AUS)

==== 4 x 25 m Manikin Relay ====
Games	Gold	Silver	Bronze
1989 Karlsruhe	Italy (ITA)	Soviet Union (URS)	West Germany (FRG)
1993 The Hague	Germany (GER)	Netherlands (NED)	Sweden (SWE)
1997 Lahti	Spain (ESP)	Italy (ITA)	Germany (GER)
2013 Cali	Germany (GER)	Belgium (BEL)	Netherlands (NED)
2017 Wrocław	Belgium (BEL)	China (CHN)	Germany (GER)

==== 4 x 50 m Medley Relay ====
Games	Gold	Silver	Bronze
1985 London	Italy (ITA)	West Germany (FRG)	Spain (ESP)
1989 Karlsruhe	Soviet Union (URS)	Italy (ITA)	West Germany (FRG)
1993 The Hague	Germany (GER)	Italy (ITA)	Sweden (SWE)
1997 Lahti	Germany (GER)	Netherlands (NED)	Italy (ITA)
2013 Cali	France (FRA)	Netherlands (NED)	Germany (GER)
2017 Wrocław	Germany (GER)	Australia (AUS)	Poland (POL)

==== 4 x 50 m Obstacle Relay ====
Games	Gold	Silver	Bronze
2013 Cali	France (FRA)	China (CHN)	Italy (ITA)
2017 Wrocław	France (FRA)	Australia (AUS)	China (CHN)

==== 4 x 50 m Rescue Tube Relay ====
Games	Gold	Silver	Bronze
1989 Karlsruhe	Italy (ITA)	Soviet Union (URS)	West Germany (FRG)
1993 The Hague	Germany (GER)	Sweden (SWE)	South Africa (RSA)
1997 Lahti	Italy (ITA)	Germany (GER)	Netherlands (NED)

==== 2 x 2 Rescue Ball Relay ====
Games	Gold	Silver	Bronze
1993 The Hague	Sweden (SWE)	Italy (ITA)	Great Britain (GBR)
1997 Lahti	Belgium (BEL)	Italy (ITA)	Germany (GER)

==== Beach Flags ====
Games	Gold	Silver	Bronze
2001 Akita	Masami Yusa; Japan	Kozue Fujiwara; Japan	Jenna Worlock; South Africa

==== Board Race ====
Games	Gold	Silver	Bronze
2001 Akita	Karla Gilbert; Australia	Gabriella Moses; Australia	Jenna Worlock; South Africa
2005 Duisburg	Kristy Munroe; Australia	Naomi Flood; Australia	Anaïs Riand; France
2009 Kaohsiung	Nikki Cox; New Zealand	Naomi Flood; Australia	Madison Boon; New Zealand

==== Oceanwoman ====
Games	Gold	Silver	Bronze
2005 Duisburg	Naomi Flood; Australia	Emma Wynne; Australia	Kristy Munroe; Australia
2009 Kaohsiung	Naomi Flood; Australia	Kristyl Smith; Australia	Nikki Cox; New Zealand

==== Surf Race ====
Games	Gold	Silver	Bronze
2001 Akita	Karla Gilbert; Australia	Candice Crafford; South Africa	Kate Krywulycz; Australia
2005 Duisburg	Bieke Vandenabeele; Belgium	Maartje van Keulen; Netherlands	Irene Zamora; Spain
2009 Kaohsiung	Kristyl Smith; Australia	Naomi Flood; Australia	Ayla Dunlop-Barrett; New Zealand

==== Overall Team ====
Note: (Note: In 2001, the overall team event combined results in these five non-medal events to determine the final ranking: 4x50m obstacle relay, 4x25m manikin carry, 4x50m rescue tube relay, rescue tube race and board rescue race. In 2005 and 2009, the overall team event combined results in these five non-medal events to determine the final ranking: 4x50m obstacle relay, 4x25m manikin carry, 4x50m medley relay, rescue tube race and board rescue race)

Games	Gold	Silver	Bronze
2001 Akita	Australia (AUS)	South Africa (RSA)	Germany (GER)
2005 Duisburg	Netherlands (NED)	Germany (GER)	Australia (AUS)
2009 Kaohsiung	Germany (GER)	Australia (AUS)	China (CHN); Italy (ITA)
