= Wushu at the 2013 World Games =

- Venue: Evangelista Mora Coliseum
- Dates: 2–3 August 2013

The wushu competition at the 2013 World Games was held from August 2 to August 3 at the Evangelista Mora Coliseum in Cali, Colombia. This was the second time wushu was featured as an invitational sport at the games, with its first appearance being in 2009.

== Participating nations ==
- Argentina (2)
- Brazil (1)
- Canada (3)
- Chile (2)
- China (7)
- France (3)
- Hong Kong (2)
- India (1)
- Indonesia (2)
- Iran (4)
- Japan (3)
- Malaysia (4)
- Mexico (3)
- Russia (2)
- Turkey (3)
- Ukraine (1)
- United States (3)
- Vietnam (3)

== Medal summary ==
=== Medal table ===
Rank	Nation	Gold	Silver	Bronze	Total
1	China	5	1	1	7
2	Iran	4	0	0	4
3	France	1	2	0	3
3	Vietnam	1	2	0	3
5	United States	1	0	1	2
6	Hong Kong	1	0	0	1
6	Indonesia	1	0	0	1
8	Malaysia	0	2	2	4
9	Russia	0	2	0	2
10	Turkey	0	1	1	2
11	Brazil	0	1	0	1
11	Canada	0	1	0	1
11	Chile	0	1	0	1
11	India	0	1	0	1
15	Argentina	0	0	1	1
15	Japan	0	0	1	1
15	Mexico	0	0	1	1
15	Ukraine	0	0	1	1
Totals (18 entries)		14	14	9	37

=== Taolu ===
==== Men ====
Event	Gold	Silver	Bronze
Changquan	Colvin Wang; United States	Ariel Mancilla; Chile	Luis Felipe Álvarez Rosas; Mexico
Daoshu / Gunshu	Zhu Leiming; China	Nguyễn Mạnh Quyền; Vietnam	Ng Say Yoke; Malaysia
Nanquan / Nangun	Farshad Arabi; Iran	Marcelo Yamada; Brazil	Takahiro Kawaguchi; Japan
Taijiquan / Taijijian	Nguyễn Thanh Tùng; Vietnam	Lee Yang; Malaysia	Lu Rufei; China

==== Women ====
Event	Gold	Silver	Bronze
Changquan	Gu Junxia; China	Andrea Hung; Canada	Natalia Sosa; Argentina
Jianshu / Qiangshu	Zheng Tian Hui; Hong Kong	Dương Thúy Vi; Vietnam	Brenda Hatley; United States
Nanquan / Nandao	Chen Huiying; China	Tatiana Ivshina; Russia	Diana Bong; Malaysia
Taijiquan / Taijijian	Lindswell Kwok; Indonesia	Ng Shin Yii; Malaysia	None awarded

=== Sanda ===
==== Men ====
Event	Gold	Silver	Bronze
56 kg	Zhou Yongshan; China	Hüseyin Dündar; Turkey	None awarded
65 kg	Mohsen Mohammadseifi; Iran	Pierre Moua; France	Savaş Bekar; Turkey
75 kg	Javad Aghaei; Iran	Liu Qiang; China	None awarded
85 kg	Hamid Reza Gholipour; Iran	Arslan Bektemirov; Russia	Dmytro Batok; Ukraine

==== Women ====
Event	Gold	Silver	Bronze
52 kg	Li Tingting; China	Manon Nardy; France	None awarded
60 kg	Valérie Domergue; France	Pooja Kadian; India	None awarded
