= Ju-jitsu at the 2013 World Games – Men's fighting 69 kg =

Ju-jitsu men's fighting 69 kg at the 2013 World Games
- Venue: Evangelista Mora Coliseum, Cali, Colombia
- Dates: 29 July 2013
- Competitors: 7 from 7 nations

Medalists
| gold medal | (Denmark) Mathias Willard |
| silver medal | (Russia) Dmitry Beshenets |
| bronze medal | (France) Sébastien Marty |

The men's fighting 69 kg competition in ju-jitsu at the 2013 World Games took place on 29 July 2013 at the Evangelista Mora Coliseum in Cali, Colombia.

== Competition format ==
A total of 7 athletes entered the competition. They fought in stepladder system.

== Results ==
=== Gold medal bracket ===
Quarterfinals
(Mexico) Adolfo Trejo (MEX) | 23
(Colombia) Hair Bohorquez Coy (COL) | 9
(Italy) Giovannibattista Vitale (ITA) | 50
(Cuba) Hernan Gonzalez (CUB) | 0
(France) Sébastien Marty (FRA) | 4
(Denmark) Mathias Willard (DEN) | 10

Semifinals
(Russia) Dmitry Beshenets (RUS) | 16
(Mexico) Adolfo Trejo (MEX) | 0
(Italy) Giovannibattista Vitale (ITA) | 0
(Denmark) Mathias Willard (DEN) | 50

Final
(Russia) Dmitry Beshenets (RUS) | 3
(Denmark) Mathias Willard (DEN) | 7

=== Bronze medal bracket ===
Quarterfinals
(Cuba) Hernan Gonzalez (CUB) | 9
(France) Sébastien Marty (FRA) | 21

Semifinals
(Colombia) Hair Bohorquez Coy (COL) | 14
(Italy) Giovannibattista Vitale (ITA) | 0
(France) Sébastien Marty (FRA) | 50
(Mexico) Adolfo Trejo (MEX) | 0

Final
(Colombia) Hair Bohorquez Coy (COL) | 5
(France) Sébastien Marty (FRA) | 15
