= 2024 Lifesaving World Championships =

- Venues: Gold Coast Aquatic Centre (pool events), Kurrawa Beach (ocean events)
- Location: Gold Coast, Australia
- Dates: 20 August – 8 September

The 2024 Lifesaving World Championships were held in Gold Coast, Australia from 20 August to 8 September 2024. At this world championships competitions in following divisions were held: National teams open (pool and ocean), national teams youth (pool and ocean), interclub open (pool and ocean), interclub youth (pool and ocean), interclub masters (pool and ocean), surf boats open and masters, interclub 2km Beach Run & 3x1km Relays, IRB interclub, IRB national teams and march past.

== Medal overview - National Teams Open (Pool) ==
=== Men's events ===
Event	Gold		Silver		Bronze	
200 m obstacle swim	Kacper Majchrzak; Poland	1:51.73	James Koch; Australia	1:53.72	Louis Clark; New Zealand	1:55.20
100 m manikin carry with fins	Fergus Eadie; New Zealand	43.97	Harrison Hynes; Australia	44.19	Tim Brang; Germany	45.49
100 m rescue medley	Francesco Ippolito; Italy	57.98	Fergus Eadie; New Zealand	58.06	Simone Locchi; Italy	58.15
200 m super lifesaver	Francesco Ippolito; Italy	2:05.74	James Koch; Australia	2:07.38	Fabio Pezzotti; Italy	2:09.26
50 m manikin carry	Fergus Eadie; New Zealand	27.77	Jake Smith; Australia	27.88	Francesco Ippolito; Italy	27.97
100 m manikin tow with fins	Harrison Hynes; Australia	47.68	Davide Cremonini; Italy	48.44	Tom Durager; France	49.04
4 × 50 m obstacle relay	Poland; Kacper Majchrzak; Bartosz Makowski; Hubert Nakielski; Adam Dubiel	1:37.19	Australia; James Koch; Corey Fletcher; Harrison Hynes; Jake Smith	1:37.30	Great Britain; Samuel Lawman; Thomas Leggett; Jack Sadberry; Thomas Trebilcock	1:37.75
4 × 25 m manikin relay	Italy; Francesco Ippolito; Fabio Pezzotti; Simone Locchi; Davide Cremonini	1:03.51	Australia; James Koch; Jake Smith; Corey Fletcher; Harrison Hynes	1:05.75	Spain; Raul Marek Szpunar Rosa; Carlos Coronado Tejeda; Marco Plazuelo Jimenez; Ivan Romero Fernandez	1:06.19
4 × 50 m medley relay	France; Goroco Koindredi; Tom Durager; Kevin Lasserre; Florian Delahaye	1:26.76	Australia; Zach Morris; Jake Smith; Harrison Hynes; James Koch	1:27.78	Italy; Francesco Ippolito; Fabio Pezzotti; Simone Locchi; Davide Cremonini	1:28.34
Line throw	Chinese Taipei; Chen Jen-hsun; Huang Wei-en	10.53	Iran; Seyedmohammad Hosseini; Amirarsalan Zarei	10.88	Sweden; Lukas Isaksson; Max Gansberg	11.01

=== Women's events ===
Event	Gold		Silver		Bronze	
200 m obstacle swim	Nina Holt; Germany	2:07.08	Chelsea Jones; Australia	2:08.84	Lucrezia Fabretti; Italy	2:09.45
100 m manikin carry with fins	Lucrezia Fabretti; Italy	50.96	Zoe Crawford; New Zealand	51.28	Federica Volpini; Italy	51.68
100 m rescue medley	Nina Holt; Germany	1:05.75	Lena Oppermann; Germany	1:08.12	Lucrezia Fabretti; Italy	1:08.48
200 m super lifesaver	Magali Rousseau; France	2:20.26	Elisa Dibellonia; Italy	2:21.51	Chelsea Jones; Australia	2:23.86
50 m manikin carry	Nina Holt; Germany	32.20	Helene Giovanelli; Italy	33.14	Lena Oppermann; Germany	33.81
100 m manikin tow with fins	Zoe Crawford; New Zealand	55.43	Madison Kidd; New Zealand	55.56	Undine Lauerwald; Germany	56.01
4 × 50 m obstacle relay	New Zealand; Madison Kidd; Molly Shivnan; Raeann Kwan; Zoe Crawford	1:48.85	Italy; Helene Giovanelli; Federica Volpini; Lucrezia Fabretti; Elisa Dibellonia	1:51.20	Germany; Nina Holt; Lena Oppermann; Undine Lauerwald; Alica Gebhardt	1:52.10
4 × 25 m manikin relay	Germany; Lena Oppermann; Undine Lauerwald; Nina Holt; Alica Gebhardt	1:14.72	France; Elise Daudignon; Magali Rousseau; Margaux Fabre; Camille Julien	1:17.19	Italy; Helene Giovanelli; Federica Volpini; Lucrezia Fabretti; Elisa Dibellonia	1:17.97
4 × 50 m medley relay	Germany; Nina Holt; Lena Oppermann; Alica Gebhardt; Undine Lauerwald	1:38.55	Italy; Helene Giovanelli; Federica Volpini; Lucrezia Fabretti; Elisa Dibellonia	1:38.91	New Zealand; Molly Shivnan; Madison Kidd; Raeann Kwan; Zoe Crawford	1:38.94
Line throw	Sweden; Alice Westergården; Tindra Nordin	11.91	Norway; Ine Aasum; Stina Kletvang	12.85	New Zealand; Raeann Kwan; Zoe Crawford	15.00

=== Mixed events ===
Event	Gold		Silver		Bronze	
4 × 50 m lifesaver relay	Italy; Federica Volpini; Lucrezia Fabretti; Francesco Ippolito; Simone Locchi	1:44.66	New Zealand; Raeann Kwan; Madison Kidd; Fergus Eadie; Christopher Dawson	1:44.99	Germany; Nina Holt; Lena Oppermann; Felix Hofmann; Tim Brang	1:45.85
SERC (Simulated Emergency Response Competition)	Japan	293.50	Switzerland	285.80	Ireland	268.80

=== Medal table ===
Rank	Nation	Gold	Silver	Bronze	Total
1	Italy	5	5	8	18
2	Germany	5	1	5	11
3	New Zealand	4	4	3	11
4	France	2	1	1	4
5	Poland	2	0	0	2
6	Australia*	1	8	1	10
7	Sweden	1	0	1	2
8	Chinese Taipei	1	0	0	1
8	Japan	1	0	0	1
10	Iran	0	1	0	1
10	Norway	0	1	0	1
10	Switzerland	0	1	0	1
13	Great Britain	0	0	1	1
13	Ireland	0	0	1	1
13	Spain	0	0	1	1
Totals (15 entries)		22	22	22	66

== Medal overview - National Teams Open (Ocean) ==
=== Men's events ===
Event	Gold	Silver	Bronze
Surf race	Zach Morris; Australia	Joseph Stuart Collins; New Zealand	James Koch; Australia
Board race	Corey Fletcher; Australia	Zach Morris; Australia	Joseph Stuart Collins; New Zealand
Surf ski race	Matthew Coetzer; South Africa	Corey Fletcher; Australia	Joseph Stuart Collins; New Zealand
Oceanman	Joseph Stuart Collins; New Zealand	Zach Morris; Australia	Cory Robinson Taylor; New Zealand
Beach flags	Shohgo Horie; Japan	Jason Gough; Australia	Marco Plazuelo Jimenez; Spain
Beach sprint	Oska Smith; New Zealand	Konner Knarr; United States	Samuel Booysen; South Africa
Board rescue	Australia; Corey Fletcher; Zach Morris	New Zealand; Joseph Stuart Collins; Cory Robinson Taylor	France; Kevin Lasserre; Mael Tissier
Rescue tube rescue	Australia; James Koch; Corey Fletcher; Harrison Hynes; Jake Smith	New Zealand; Joseph Stuart Collins; Louis Clark; Fergus Eadie; Cory Robinson Taylor	France; Florian Delahaye; Kevin Lasserre; Goroco Koindredi; Tom Durager
Beach relay	Egypt; Mostafa Tarek Abdelazez; Ayman Mohammed Elsaaid; Amr Hany Kotb; Ramy Hussien Shalaby	Australia; Jason Gough; Corey Fletcher; Jake Smith; Zach Morris	France; Mael Tissier; Noe Le Brun; Tom Durager; Florian Delahaye
Oceanman relay	Australia; Zach Morris; Corey Fletcher; Jason Gough; James Koch	New Zealand; Louis Clark; Joseph Stuart Collins; Cory Robinson Taylor; Oska Smith	Great Britain; Samuel Lawman; Piran Phillips; Thomas Leggett; Robert Whittaker

=== Women's events ===
Event	Gold	Silver	Bronze
Surf race	Lana Rogers; Australia	Olivia Rose Corrin; New Zealand	Naomi Scott; Australia
Board race	Olivia Rose Corrin; New Zealand	Naomi Scott; Australia	Lana Rogers; Australia
Surf ski race	Naomi Scott; Australia	Evie Wong; Great Britain	Olivia Rose Corrin; New Zealand
Oceanwoman	Lana Rogers; Australia	Naomi Scott; Australia	Olivia Rose Corrin; New Zealand
Beach flags	Annah Abravanel; France	Britney Ingr; Australia	Natsu Ishiguro; Japan
Beach sprint	Briana Irving; New Zealand	Britney Ingr; Australia	Maram Mahmoud Regal; Egypt
Board rescue	Australia; Lana Rogers; Naomi Scott	New Zealand; Molly Shivnan; Olivia Rose Corrin	Great Britain; Ellie McCloy; Anya Hocking
Rescue tube rescue	New Zealand; Molly Shivnan; Zoe Crawford; Madison Kidd; Raeann Kwan	France; Margaux Fabre; Camille Julien; Elise Daudignon; Magali Rousseau	Australia; Naomi Scott; Mariah Jones; Chelsea Jones; Lana Rogers
Beach relay	Egypt; Engy Tarek Yassen; Malak Ayman Rashwan; Maram Mahmoud Regal; Hala Sedky Ahmed	Iran; Kazhan Rostami; Maryam Mohebbi; Faezeh Ashourpour; Pardis Abdolmohammadi	Australia; Naomi Scott; Britney Ingr; Lana Rogers; Mariah Jones
Oceanwoman relay	New Zealand; Molly Shivnan; Olivia Rose Corrin; Zoe Crawford; Briana Irving	France; Margaux Fabre; Thaïs Delrieux; Elise Daudignon; Annah Abravanel	Australia; Naomi Scott; Lana Rogers; Britney Ingr; Chelsea Jones

=== Mixed events ===
Event	Gold	Silver	Bronze
Ocean lifesaver relay	New Zealand; Briana Irving; Louis Clark; Olivia Rose Corrin; Cory Robinson Taylor	Australia; Lana Rogers; Corey Fletcher; Zach Morris; Britney Ingr	France; Kevin Lasserre; Mael Tissier; Thaïs Delrieux; Elise Daudignon

=== Medal table ===
Rank	Nation	Gold	Silver	Bronze	Total
1	Australia*	9	10	6	25
2	New Zealand	7	6	5	18
3	Egypt	2	0	1	3
4	France	1	2	4	7
5	Japan	1	0	1	2
5	South Africa	1	0	1	2
7	Great Britain	0	1	2	3
8	Iran	0	1	0	1
8	United States	0	1	0	1
10	Spain	0	0	1	1
Totals (10 entries)		21	21	21	63
