= Ju-jitsu at the 2013 World Games – Women's fighting 55 kg =

Women's fighting 55 kg at the 2013 World Games
- Venue: Evagelista Mora Coliseum
- Date: 30 July 2013
- Competitors: 6 from 6 nations

Medalists
1st place, gold medalist(s)		(Germany) Mandy Sonnemann
2nd place, silver medalist(s)		(Poland) Martyna Bierońska
3rd place, bronze medalist(s)		(Norway) Anna Knutsen

The women's fighting 55 kg competition in ju-jitsu at the 2013 World Games took place on 30 July 2013 at the Evagelista Mora Coliseum in Cali, Colombia.

== Results ==
=== Elimination round ===
==== Group A ====
Rank	Athlete	B	W	L	Pts	Score
1	Mandy Sonnemann (GER)	2	2	0	24–14	+10
2	Anna Knutsen (NOR)	2	1	1	12–16	–4
3	Jessica Scricciolo (ITA)	2	0	2	9–15	–6

	Score	
Mandy Sonnemann (GER)	14–7	Anna Knutsen (NOR)
Mandy Sonnemann (GER)	10–7	Jessica Scricciolo (ITA)
Anna Knutsen (NOR)	5–2	Jessica Scricciolo (ITA)

==== Group B ====
Rank	Athlete	B	W	L	Pts	Score
1	Martyna Bierońska (POL)	2	2	0	58–6	+52
2	Hsiao Hui-shan (TPE)	2	1	1	16–17	–1
3	Sara Svensson (SWE)	2	0	2	9–60	–51

	Score	
Martyna Bierońska (POL)	8–6	Hsiao Hui-shan (TPE)
Martyna Bierońska (POL)	50–0	Sara Svensson (SWE)
Hsiao Hui-shan (TPE)	10–9	Sara Svensson (SWE)

=== Finals ===
Semifinals
Mandy Sonnemann (GER)	12
Hsiao Hui-shan (TPE)	5
Martyna Bierońska (POL)	7
Anna Knutsen (NOR)	2

Final
Mandy Sonnemann (GER)	8
Martyna Bierońska (POL)	3
Third place
Hsiao Hui-shan (TPE)	7
Anna Knutsen (NOR)	7
