= Ju-jitsu at the 2013 World Games – Men's ne-waza 85 kg =

Men's ne-waza 85 kg at the 2013 World Games
- Venue: Evagelista Mora Coliseum
- Date: 29 July 2013
- Competitors: 6 from 6 nations

Medalists
1st place, gold medalist(s)		(Mexico) Dan Schon
2nd place, silver medalist(s)		(France) Sébastien Lecocq
3rd place, bronze medalist(s)		(Israel) Roy Pariente

The men's ne-waza 85 kg competition in ju-jitsu at the 2013 World Games took place on 29 July 2013 at the Evagelista Mora Coliseum in Cali, Colombia.

== Results ==
=== Elimination round ===
==== Group A ====
Rank	Athlete	B	W	L	Pts	Score
1	Dan Schon (MEX)	2	2	0	200–0	+200
2	Roy Pariente (ISR)	2	1	1	100–100	0
3	Juan Pablo Vietri (ARG)	2	0	2	0–200	–200

	Score	
Juan Pablo Vietri (ARG)	0–100	Dan Schon (MEX)
Juan Pablo Vietri (ARG)	0–100	Roy Pariente (ISR)
Dan Schon (MEX)	100–0	Roy Pariente (ISR)

==== Group B ====
Rank	Athlete	B	W	L	Pts	Score
1	Sébastien Lecocq (FRA)	2	2	0	200–0	+200
2	Franz Lukasch (AUT)	2	1	1	100–100	0
3	Edwin Cabezas Mondragón (COL)	2	0	2	0–200	–200

	Score	
Sébastien Lecocq (FRA)	100–0	Franz Lukasch (AUT)
Sébastien Lecocq (FRA)	100–0	Edwin Cabezas Mondragón (COL)
Franz Lukasch (AUT)	100–0	Edwin Cabezas Mondragón (COL)

=== Finals ===
Semifinals
Dan Schon (MEX)	100
Franz Lukasch (AUT)	0
Sébastien Lecocq (FRA)	2
Roy Pariente (ISR)	0

Final
Dan Schon (MEX)	4
Sébastien Lecocq (FRA)	0
Third place
Franz Lukasch (AUT)	0
Roy Pariente (ISR)	100
