= Archery at the 2013 World Games =

The field archery competition at the 2013 World Games was held from July 25 to August 1 in Cali, Colombia.

The compound competition, which took the format of a fixed distance outdoor Olympic-style knockout, took place from 25 July to 28 July, with the preliminary rounds at De La Caña Park and the finals at the Mundalista Roller Skating stadium. The recurve and barebow field archery competitions took place in the San Antonio Hills Park from 29 July to 1 August. Qualification took place over two rounds, involving first 24 unmarked targets, then 24 marked targets ranging from 5–60 metres. The top four qualifiers then competed head to head in semi-finals and finals over four different targets.

== Medal summary ==
=== Medal table ===
Rank	Nation	Gold	Silver	Bronze	Total
1	United States (USA)	3	1	0	4
2	Italy (ITA)	1	1	2	4
3	France (FRA)	1	1	0	2
4	Great Britain (GBR)	1	0	1	2
4	Sweden (SWE)	1	0	1	2
6	Germany (GER)	0	1	1	2
7	Australia (AUS)	0	1	0	1
7	Denmark (DEN)	0	1	0	1
7	Spain (ESP)	0	1	0	1
10	Colombia (COL)	0	0	1	1
10	El Salvador (ESA)	0	0	1	1
Totals (11 entries)		7	7	7	21

=== Compound ===
Event	Gold	Silver	Bronze
Men	Reo Wilde; United States	Pierre-Julien Deloche; France	Roberto Hernández; El Salvador
Women	Erika Jones; United States	Camilla Sømod; Denmark	Sara López; Colombia
Mixed Team	United States; Reo Wilde; Erika Jones	Italy; Sergio Pagni; Marcella Tonioli	Germany; Paul Titscher; Kristina Berger

=== Recurve ===
Event	Gold	Silver	Bronze
Men	Jean-Charles Valladont; France	Brady Ellison; United States	Alan Wills; Great Britain
Women	Naomi Folkard; Great Britain	Elena Richter; Germany	Jessica Tomasi; Italy

=== Barebow ===
Event	Gold	Silver	Bronze
Men	Giuseppe Seimandi; Italy	David Garcia; Spain	Bobby Larsson; Sweden
Women	Lina Björklund; Sweden	Andrea Raigel; Austria	Eleonora Strobbe; Italy
