= Malaysia at the 2013 World Games =

- IOC code: MAS
- NOC: Olympic Council of Malaysia

in Cali, Colombia
- Competitors: 10 in 4 sports
- Medals Ranked 37th: Gold 1 Silver 0 Bronze 0 Total 1

World Games appearances (overview)
- 1981; 1985; 1989; 1993; 1997; 2001; 2005; 2009; 2013; 2017; 2022; 2025

Malaysia participated in the 2013 World Games in Cali, Colombia on July 25, 2013, to August 4, 2013. Malaysia took one gold medal in squash.

== Competitors ==
The following is the list of number of competitors in the Games.

Sport	Men	Women	Total
Bowling	1	1	2
Karate	1	0	1
Squash	1	2	3
Wushu	2	2	4
Total	5	5	10

== Squash ==
=== Women's singles ===
First Round
1	(Malaysia) Nicol David
Bye
(Guyana) Mary Fung-a-Fat	0
9/16	(Germany) Franziska Hennes	3
9/16	(Canada) Samantha Cornett
Bye
Bye
7	(United Kingdom) Sarah-Jane Perry
5	(Australia) Rachael Grinham
Bye
Bye
9/16	(India) Joshna Chinappa
9/16	(Colombia) Catalina Peláez	3
(Hungary) Edina Szombati	0
Bye
4	(France) Camille Serme
3	(Netherlands) Natalie Grinham
Bye
(Colombia) Laura Tovar	1
9/16	(Brazil) Thaisa Serafini	3
9/16	(Japan) Misaki Kobayashi
Bye
Bye
8	(Mexico) Samantha Terán
6	(Australia) Donna Urquhart
Bye
Bye
9/16	(United Kingdom) Emma Beddoes
9/16	(Pakistan) Maria Toor Pakay
Bye
Bye
2	(Malaysia) Low Wee Wern

Round of 16
1	(Malaysia) Nicol David	3
9/16	(Germany) Franziska Hennes	0
9/16	(Canada) Samantha Cornett	1
7	(United Kingdom) Sarah-Jane Perry	3
5	(Australia) Rachael Grinham	3
9/16	(India) Joshna Chinappa	0
9/16	(Colombia) Catalina Peláez	0
4	(France) Camille Serme	3
3	(Netherlands) Natalie Grinham	3
9/16	(Brazil) Thaisa Serafini	0
9/16	(Japan) Misaki Kobayashi	3
8	(Mexico) Samantha Terán	2
6	(Australia) Donna Urquhart	0
9/16	(United Kingdom) Emma Beddoes	3
9/16	(Pakistan) Maria Toor Pakay	w/o
2	(Malaysia) Low Wee Wern

Quarter finals
1	(Malaysia) Nicol David	3
7	(United Kingdom) Sarah-Jane Perry	0
5	(Australia) Rachael Grinham	1
4	(France) Camille Serme	3
3	(Netherlands) Natalie Grinham	3
9/16	(Japan) Misaki Kobayashi	1
9/16	(United Kingdom) Emma Beddoes	0
2	(Malaysia) Low Wee Wern	3

Semi finals
1	(Malaysia) Nicol David	3
4	(France) Camille Serme	0
3	(Netherlands) Natalie Grinham	3
2	(Malaysia) Low Wee Wern	1

Finals
1	(Malaysia) Nicol David	3
3	(Netherlands) Natalie Grinham	0

Note: * w/d = Withdraw, * w/o = Walkover, * r = Retired

3rd place
4	(France) Camille Serme	3
2	(Malaysia) Low Wee Wern	0
