= Lifesaving at the 2025 World Games – Men's 100 metres manikin carry with fins =

Men's 100 metres manikin carry with fins at the 2025 World Games
- Venue: Chengdu Sport University Sancha Lake Campus Natatorium, Chengdu, China
- Date: 8 August
- Competitors: 8 from 6 nations

Medalists
1st place, gold medalist(s)		Tom Durager	France
2nd place, silver medalist(s)		Davide Cremonini	Italy
3rd place, bronze medalist(s)		Fergus Eadie	New Zealand

The men's 100 metres manikin carry with fins competition at the 2025 World Games took place on 8 August at the Chengdu Sport University Sancha Lake Campus Natatorium in Chengdu, China.

== Background ==
=== Competition format ===
A total of eight athletes from six nations qualified based on a qualifying time.

=== World Record ===
Record	Athlete (nation)	Time (s)	Location	Date
World record	Tom Durager (FRA)	43.44	Montpelier, France	30 May 2025

== Results ==
The results were a follows:

Rank	Lane	Athlete	Nation	Time	Note
1st place, gold medalist(s)	6	Tom Durager	France	43.81	
2nd place, silver medalist(s)	3	Davide Cremonini	Italy	44.42	
3rd place, bronze medalist(s)	4	Fergus Eadie	New Zealand	44.43	
4	1	Andrea Borona	Italy	45.27	
5	2	Tim Brang	Germany	45.32	
6	8	Jaime Irueste	Spain	46.30	
7	7	Ivan Romero	Spain	46.46	
8	5	Harrison Hynes	Australia	49.44	
