= Racquetball at the 2013 World Games =

- Venue: Cañasgordas Club
- Dates: 26-28 July

The racquetball competition at the World Games 2013 took place from July 26 to 28, 2013 at the Cañasgordas Club in Cali, Colombia.

Players qualified for this event from their performances at the 2012 Racquetball World Championships in Santo Domingo, Dominican Republic.

== Medals table ==
* Host nation (Colombia)

Rank	Nation	Gold	Silver	Bronze	Total
1	Mexico (MEX)	2	1	0	3
2	Colombia (COL)*	0	1	0	1
3	United States (USA)	0	0	2	2
Totals (3 entries)		2	2	2	6

== Medals summary ==
Event	Gold	Silver	Bronze
Men's singles	Polo Gutierrez; Mexico	Gilberto Mejia; Mexico	Rocky Carson; United States
Women's singles	Paola Longoria; Mexico	Cristina Amaya; Colombia	Rhonda Rajsich; United States
