= Naomi Flood =

Australian kayaker (born 1986)

Personal information
- Nickname: Floody
- Nationality: Australian
- Born: 17 April 1986 (age 40) Sydney
- Height: 175 cm (5 ft 9 in) (2012)

Sport
- Country: Australia
- Sport: Canoeing
- Events: K-2 500 m K1 1000m
- Club: Manly Warringah Kayak Club
Medal record
Women's lifesaving
Representing Australia
The World Games
Gold medal – first place	2005 Duisburg	Oceanwoman
Gold medal – first place	2009 Kaohsiung	Oceanwoman
Silver medal – second place	2005 Duisburg	Board race
Silver medal – second place	2009 Kaohsiung	Board race
Silver medal – second place	2009 Kaohsiung	Surf race

Naomi Flood (born 7 April 1986) is an Australian kayaker. She was the 2009 overall winner for the Ironwoman Series. She represented Australia at 2012 Summer Olympics in the K-2 500 m event, with teammate Lyndsie Fogarty.

== Personal ==
Nicknamed Floody, Flood was born on 17 April 1986 in Sydney. She went to primary school at Bilgola Plateau Public School before going to high school at Barrenjoey High School. She attended Northern Beaches TAFE from 2004 to 2005, where she earned a Diploma of Hospitality Management. As of 2012, she is pursuing a Bachelor of Communications from Open University Australia. As of 2012, she lives in northern Sydney.

Naomi is a member of the Manly Surf Life Saving Club. As a surf lifesaver, she has won several medals at the Australian Surf Life Saving Championships. In 2009, she was the overall winner for the Ironwoman Series after winning the Australian and world titles in the competition.

Flood is 175 centimetres (69 in) tall.

== Canoeing ==
Flood started canoeing in 2009 with friends from surfing in order to improve her surf ski skills. She was coached by Katrin Borchert from 2010 to 2011 before switching coaches to Martin Marinov in 2011. Her primary training base is on the Gold Coast, Australia with a secondary base in Sydney. She is a member of the Manly Warringah Kayak Club. She has a canoe scholarship with the Australian Institute of Sport and the NSW Institute of Sport.

Flood finished 3rd in the K1 1000m event at the 2011 World Championships in Szeged, Hungary. She finished 5th in the K4 500m event at the 2011 World Cup 2 in Racice, Czech Republic. She finished 9th in the K2 500m event at the 2011 World Cup 3 in Duisburg, Germany. She finished 2nd in the K2 500m event and 2nd in the K4 500m event at the 2012 Oceania Championships in Penrith, Australia. She finished 1st in the K2 500m event and 2nd in the K4 500m event at the 2012 National Championships in Penrith, Australia. At the 2012 ICF Sprint World Cup in Russia, she came in first in the K1 1000m event.

Flood has been selected to represent Australia at the 2012 Summer Olympics in the K-2 500 m event. She trained in the Gold Coast in May and June 2012. Before the start of the Games, she and her canoe teammates trained in Italy at the AIS European Training Centre located in Varese.
