= Lifesaving at the 2025 World Games – Men's 4x50-metres pool life saver relay =

Men's 4x50-metres pool life saver relay at the 2025 World Games
- Venue: Chengdu Sport University Sancha Lake Campus Natatorium, Chengdu, China
- Date: 8 August
- Competitors: 32 from 8 nations

Medalists
1st place, gold medalist(s)		Gabriele Brambillaschi; Davide Cremonini; Simone Locchi; Fabio Pezzotti	Italy
2nd place, silver medalist(s)		Sebastien Pierre Louis; Jan Malkowski; Danny Wieck; Tim Brand	Germany
3rd place, bronze medalist(s)		Goroco Koindredi; Tom Durager; Elouan Deffin; Arnaud Cordoba	France

The men's 4x50-metres pool life saver relay competition at the 2025 World Games took place on 8 August at the Chengdu Sport University Sancha Lake Campus Natatorium in Chengdu, China.

== Background ==
=== Competition format ===
A total of eight teams of four athletes each qualified based on a qualifying time.

=== World Record ===
Record	Athlete (nation)	Time (s)	Location	Date
World record	Germany	1:46.37	Riccione, Italy	21 September 2019

== Results ==
The results were a follows:

Rank	Lane	Athlete	Nation	Time	Note
1st place, gold medalist(s)	8	Italy	Gabriele Brambillaschi (22.59); Davide Cremonini (14.49); Simone Locchi (20.39); Fabio Pezzotti (41.65)	1:39.12	WR
2nd place, silver medalist(s)	2	Germany	Sebastien Pierre Louis (23.06); Jan Malkowski (2:30); Danny Wieck (45.85); Tim Brand (28.71)	1:39.92	
3rd place, bronze medalist(s)	1	France	Goroco Koindredi (22.96); Tom Durager (3.19); Elouan Deffin (43.40); Arnaud Cordoba (31.49)	1:41.04	
4	7	Spain	Raúl Szpunar (23.88); Marco Plazuelo (2.13); Carlos Coronado (51.25); Ivan Romero (25.38)	1:42.64	
5	3	Japan	Daichi Inomata (23.19); Kota Sekiguchi (3.11); Ryunosuke Handa (42.44); Shun Nishiyama (34.07)	1:42.81	
6	5	Poland	Kacper Majchrzak (22.97); Mateusz Grabski (2.78); Adam Dubiel (29.69); Hubert Nakielski (47.88)	1:43.32	
7	6	Australia	James Koch (23.83); Harrison Hynes (18.70); Jake Smith (34.61); Callum Brennan (26.69)	1:43.83	
8	4	Hungary	Szebasztián Szabó (21.91); Krisztián Takács (13.89); Bence Gyarfas (43.25); Gábor Balog (29.88)	1:49.03	
