= Roller speed skating at the 2018 Asian Games – Women's 20000 metres elimination =

Women's 20000 metres elimination at the 2018 Asian Games
- Venue: Jakabaring Sport City
- Date: 31 August 2018
- Competitors: 16 from 8 nations

Medalists
gold medal	Li Meng-chu	Chinese Taipei
silver medal	Guo Dan	China
bronze medal	Yang Ho-chen	Chinese Taipei

The women's 20000 metres elimination competition at the 2018 Asian Games took place on 31 August 2018 at the JSC Rollerskate Circuit.

== Schedule ==
All times are Western Indonesia Time (UTC+07:00)

Date	Time	Event
Friday, 31 August 2018	15:00	Final

== Results ==
Legend

- DNF — Did not finish
- EL — Eliminated

Rank	Athlete	Time
1st place, gold medalist(s)	Lee Meng-chu (TPE)	44:50.929
2nd place, silver medalist(s)	Guo Dan (CHN)	44:50.992
3rd place, bronze medalist(s)	Yang Ho-chen (TPE)	44:51.168
4	Fang Huiyan (CHN)	44:51.646
5	Jang Soo-ji (KOR)	44:51.945
6	Yu Ga-ram (KOR)	44:52.006
7	Aarathy Kasturi Raj (IND)	44:52.341
8	Varsha S. Puranik (IND)	44:53.340
9	Patjira Srisathitha (THA)	EL
10	Alifia Meidia Namasta (INA)	EL
11	Vanessa Wong (HKG)	EL
12	Karinne Tam (HKG)	EL
13	Salma Falya Niluh Heryadie (INA)	EL
14	Pletpisut Siamchai (THA)	EL
—	Edirimunige Dasuni Soysa (SRI)	DNF
—	Samithri Maleesha Perera (SRI)	DNF
