= American Ninja Warrior: USA vs. The World =

American competition television series

- Genre: Sports entertainment Sports competition
- Created by: Ushio Higuchi
- Directed by: Patrick McManus
- Presented by: Matt Iseman; Akbar Gbaja-Biamila; Jenn Brown; Kristine Leahy; Zuri Hall
- Country of origin: United States
- Original language: English
- No. of episodes: 7

Production
- Executive producers: Arthur Smith; Kent Weed; Brian Richardson; Anthony Storm
- Camera setup: Multi-camera
- Running time: 2 hours
- Production companies: A. Smith & Co. Productions; Tokyo Broadcasting System Television, inc.

Original release
- Network: NBC
- Release: January 13, 2014 – present

American Ninja Warrior: USA vs. The World is a television special aired approximately once a year on NBC. It features an American Ninja Warrior team from the United States competing against teams from other countries or regions around the world, including Japan, Europe, Latin America, Asia, and Australia, for bragging rights and the American Ninja Warrior: USA vs. The World trophy. The competitors race on the same Mount Midoriyama course used in the National Finals on the Las Vegas Strip.

== Series overview ==
Special		Air date	Champions	Runner-up	3rd Place	4th Place	Commentators	Sideline reporter
1	USA vs. Japan	January 13, 2014	Team USA	Team Japan	—N/a		Matt Iseman and Akbar Gbaja-Biamila	Jenn Brown
2	USA vs. The World	September 15, 2014	Team Europe	Team USA	Team Japan	—N/a	Matt Iseman and Akbar Gbaja-Biamila	Jenn Brown
3	USA vs. The World	January 31, 2016	Team USA	Team Europe	Team Japan	—N/a	Matt Iseman and Akbar Gbaja-Biamila	Kristine Leahy
4	USA vs. The World	June 4, 2017	Team USA	Team Europe	Team Latin America	—N/a	Matt Iseman and Akbar Gbaja-Biamila	Kristine Leahy
5	USA vs. The World	March 11, 2018	Team Europe	Team USA	Team Latin America	Team Asia	Matt Iseman and Akbar Gbaja-Biamila	Kristine Leahy
6	USA vs. The World	January 27, 2019	Team USA	Team Australia	Team Europe	—N/a	Matt Iseman and Akbar Gbaja-Biamila	Kristine Leahy
7	USA vs. The World	January 26, 2020	Team Australia	Team USA	Team Europe	—N/a	Matt Iseman and Akbar Gbaja-Biamila	Zuri Hall

== Specials ==
=== USA vs. Japan (January 2014) ===
During the Season 5 finale of American Ninja Warrior, NBC announced that a special "USA vs. Japan" matchup would take place, the first-ever international competition in American Ninja Warrior's history. The two-hour special premiered on January 13, 2014, at 8 pm EST on NBC and matched five Japanese Sasuke All-Stars and New Stars – heroes of the original Ninja Warrior – against five American stars representing American Ninja Warrior at the American reconstruction of the Mount Midoriyama course in Las Vegas. At stake was the United States vs. Japan championship; also branded as the first world championship for Sasuke/American Ninja Warrior, and a trophy to match. The special featured American Ninja Warrior's regular broadcasting crew: analysts Matt Iseman and Akbar Gbaja-Biamila, along with sideline reporter Jenn Brown.

=== Rosters ===
Team USA
Paul Kasemir	Brent Steffensen	James McGrath	Travis Rosen	Brian Arnold

Team Japan
Shingo Yamamoto	Yuuji Urushihara	Ryo Matachi	Hitoshi Kanno	Kazuma Asa

Team USA	Team Japan
Paul Kasemir ("Mr. Consistency") – 27, Longmont, CO – 4-time Mount Midoriyama veteran; Brent Steffensen – 33, San Antonio, TX – 4-time Mount Midoriyama veteran; Top finisher at ANW 4 (Hang Climb); James McGrath ("The Beast") – 26, Seattle, WA – 3-time Mount Midoriyama veteran; Travis Rosen ("The Ageless Wonder") – 38, Franklin, TN – 3-time Mount Midoriyama veteran; Brian Arnold – 35, Brighton, CO – Top finisher at ANW 5 (Flying Bar)	Shingo Yamamoto ("The Godfather") – 39, Tokyo, Japan – All-Star, veteran of every Sasuke season; Yuuji Urushihara ("The Grand Champion") – 35, Tokyo, Japan – New Star, achieved "Total Victory" in Sasuke twice; Ryo Matachi ("The Superfan") – 24, Kawasaki, Kanagawa, Japan – New Star, reached Stage 4 once; Hitoshi Kanno ("The Muscle") – 29, Tokyo, Japan – New Star, reached Stage 4 once; Kazuma Asa ("The Speed Demon") – 31, Hyogo, Japan – New Star, Stage 1 world record holder

=== Overview ===
- There are up to 5 matches on each stage: 1, 2, and 3.
- In each match, one athlete from the US and Japan will run.
- The first team to win 3 matches wins the stage, and as the difficulty for each stage increases, so too will the points awarded.
- Stage 1 = 1 point
- Stage 2 = 2 points
- Stage 3 = 3 points
- Stage 4 = Tiebreaker
- Each team will choose one member to climb to the top of the 100-foot tower.
- Whichever athlete does it fastest, their country will take home the inaugural world championship trophy.

Obstacles
Stage 1	Stage 2	Stage 3	Stage 4
Timbers	Hang Slider	Roulette Cylinder	77-foot rope climb
Giant Cycle	Double Salmon Ladder	Doorknob Grasper	77-foot rope climb
Rope Glider	Unstable Bridge	Floating Boards	77-foot rope climb
Jumping Spider	Balance Tank	Ultimate Cliffhanger	77-foot rope climb
Half Pipe Attack	Metal Spin	Bungee Rope Climb	77-foot rope climb
Warped Wall	Wall Lift	Hang Climb	77-foot rope climb
Spinning Bridge	—N/a	Spider Flip	77-foot rope climb
Final Climb	—N/a	Flying Bar	77-foot rope climb

=== Results ===
==== Stage 1 ====
All three Americans: James McGrath, Paul Kasemir, and Brent Steffensen completed Stage 1, with Hitoshi Kanno also completing it for Team Japan. McGrath finished in 1:16.67. Kanno finished in 1:25.43. Kasemir finished in 1:24.80. Steffensen finished in a record-breaking 1:14.53, the fastest time for an American on Stage 1 until Joe Moravsky beat it with a time of 1:12.72 the next year.

==== Leaderboard ====
Order #	Competitor	Outcome	Obstacle/Result
1	Brent Steffensen	Completed	1:14.53 (previously 5th – 1:39.37 in the National Finals)
2	James McGrath	Completed	1:16.67 (previously 3rd – 1:31.53 in the National Finals)
3	Paul Kasemir	Completed	1:24.80 (previously 10th – 1:47.66 in the National Finals)
4	Hitoshi Kanno	Completed	1:25.43
5	Elet Hall	Completed	1:30.75
6	Lorin Ball	Completed	1:31.38
7	Joe Moravsky	Completed	1:33.53
8	Jesse La Flair	Completed	1:43.03
9	Josh Cook	Completed	1:43.97
10	Chris Romrell	Completed	1:45.14
11	William Brown	Completed	1:47.27
12	Drew Drechsel	Completed	1:48.37
13	Jamie Rahn	Completed	1:50.74
14	Casey Finley	Completed	1:51.10
15	Noah Kaufman	Completed	1:55.90
16	Travis Rosen	Completed	1:56.50
17	Yev Kouchnir	Completed	2:00.33
18	Kyle Sinacori	Completed	2:02.40
19	Andres De La Rosa	Completed	2:05.76
20	Brian Arnold	Completed	2:06.36
21	Travis Weinand	Completed	2:07.70
22	Idoko Abuh	Completed	2:08.02

==== Stage 2 ====
Brian Arnold and James McGrath both completed Stage 2 for Team USA. Arnold finished with a time of 1:14.63, and McGrath finished with a time of 1:15.00.

==== Leaderboard ====
Order #	Finalist	Result	Notes
1	Brian Arnold	Completed	1:14.63 (previously 4th – 1:38.77 in the National Finals)
2	James McGrath	Completed	1:15.00 (previously 2nd – 1:29.34 in the National Finals)
3	Casey Finley	Completed	1:23.64
4	Idoko Abuh	Completed	1:36.30
5	Joe Moravsky	Completed	1:47.30
6	Travis Weinand	Completed	1:54.87
7	Travis Rosen	Completed	1:59.83

==== Stage 3 ====
Paul Kasemir became the MVP of Team USA by making it all the way to the last obstacle of Stage 3, the Flying Bar, winning the competition for the Americans.

Final Score: Team USA: 6, Team Japan: 0

Champions: Team USA

=== USA vs. The World (September 2014) ===
During the Season 6 finale, NBC announced that another special entitled "USA vs. The World" matchup would take place in Las Vegas under a new format. On September 15, Team USA competed against a returning Team Japan, and a new team, Team Europe. This was the second international competition that pitted top competitors from the United States American Ninja Warrior, Japan Ninja Warrior (Sasuke), and also European All Stars. The three-hour special aired on September 15, 2014, on NBC with an encore airing September 16, 2014, on Esquire. The special once again was hosted by hosts Matt Iseman and Akbar Gbaja-Biamila, as well as sideline reporter Jenn Brown.

=== Rosters ===
Team USA
Brian Arnold	Elet Hall	Paul Kasemir	Joe Moravsky	Travis Rosen

Team Japan
Hitoshi Kanno	Kazuma Asa	Ryo Matachi	Yusuke Morimoto	Shingo Yamamoto

Team Europe
Tim Shieff (England)	Sean McColl (Canada)	Stefano Ghisolfi (Italy)	Miska Sutela (Finland)	Vadym Kuvakin (Ukraine)

Team USA	Team Japan	Team Europe
Brian Arnold – 36, Brighton, CO – American athlete who has come short on Stage 3; Elet Hall ("The Natural") – 24, Cavetown, MD – one of only two competitors to make it to Stage 3 in Season 6; Paul Kasemir ("Mr. Consistency") – 28, Longmont, CO – the M.V.P. of the team that defeated the Japanese last year; Joe Moravsky ("The Weatherman") – 25, Sherman, CT – went further than anyone else in Season 6; Travis Rosen ("The Ageless Wonder") – 40, Franklin, TN – A 2-time part of Team USA and captain of 2014's all-star group	Hitoshi Kanno ("The Muscle") – 29, Kashiwa, Japan – Reached Sasuke Stage 4, ten-time Sasuke veteran; Kazuma Asa ("The Speed Demon") – 32, Amagasaki, Japan – Stage 1 world record holder; Ryo Matachi ("The Superfan") – 25, Kawasaki, Kanagawa, Japan – Reached Sasuke Stage 4; Yusuke Morimoto ("The SASUKE Kid") – 22, Tosa, Kōchi, Japan – Sasuke rising star, competing seven times, first competing at age 15; Shingo Yamamoto ("The Godfather"), – 40, Tokyo, Japan – Captain of Team Japan and only athlete to compete in all 32 seasons of Sasuke	Tim Shieff ("Livewire") – 26, London, England – Captain of Team Europe, world champion professional freerunner, ANW veteran, competing on three seasons; Sean McColl – 27, Chambery, France – Canadian professional World Champion rock climber and current overall climbing champion; Stefano Ghisolfi – 21, Turin, Italy – Professional World Cup rock climber, number one ranked Italian climber; Miska Sutela – 23, Oulu, Finland – Ninja Warrior superfan, has trained all over the world, including Japan, trained with the Sasuke All-Stars; built 35 NW obstacles in his parents' backyard to train on.; Vadym Kuvakin – 29, Kherson, Ukraine – Former Olympic gymnast, current member of the Cirque du Soleil cast for "La Reve" in Las Vegas

=== Overview ===
- There are 3 heats on each stage: 1, 2, and 3.
- In each heat, one athlete from the US, Japan, and Europe will run.
- Stage 1 = 1 point
- Stage 2 = 2 points
- Stage 3 = 3 points
- Stage 4 = Tiebreaker
- It will come down to a 7-story rope climb to determine the winner.

Obstacles
Stage 1	Stage 2	Stage 3	Stage 4
Piston Road	Rope Jungle	Cannonball Incline	77-foot rope climb
Giant Ring	Double Salmon Ladder	Doorknob Grasper	77-foot rope climb
Silk Slider	Unstable Bridge	Floating Boards	77-foot rope climb
Jumping Spider	Butterfly Wall	Ultimate Cliffhanger	77-foot rope climb
Half Pipe Attack	Metal Spin	Propeller Bar	77-foot rope climb
Warped Wall	Wall Lift	Hang Climb	77-foot rope climb
Spinning Bridge	—N/a	Spider Flip	77-foot rope climb
Final Climb	—N/a	Flying Bar	77-foot rope climb

=== Results ===
==== Stage 1 ====
Joe Moravsky beat Brent Steffensen's record of 1:14.53 from last year's USA vs. Japan special in 1:12.72, the fastest time for an American on Stage 1. However, Tim Shieff beat Moravsky's time in a subsequent heat by finishing in 1:02.70 – the fastest time ever on Stage 1 in ANW history. Paul Kasemir also completed Stage 1 with a time of 1:17.21.

==== Leaderboard ====
Order	Finalist	Outcome	Result
1	Tim Shieff	Completed	1:02.70
2	Joe Moravsky	Completed	1:12.72 (previously 4th – 1:35.21 in the National Finals)
3	Paul Kasemir	Completed	1:17.21 (previously 3rd – 1:33.96 in the National Finals)
4	Elet Hall	Completed	1:18.40
5	Lorin Ball	Completed	1:29.71
6	Ian Dory	Completed	1:41.19
7	Joshua Cook	Completed	1:41.29
8	Chris Wilczewski	Completed	1:42.74
9	Abel Gonzalez	Completed	1:45.92
10	Jo Jo Bynum	Completed	1:47.15
11	Travis Rosen	Completed	1:47.27
12	Isaac Caldiero	Completed	1:48.42
13	Andrew Lowes	Completed	1:52.74
14	Dan Galiczynski	Completed	1:55.35
15	Ryan Stratis	Completed	1:56.34
16	Dr. Noah Kaufman	Completed	1:57.02
17	Yen Chen	Completed	2:01.40
18	Brian Arnold	Completed	2:03.43
19	J.J. Woods	Completed	2:04.73

==== Stage 2 ====
All three Americans: Travis Rosen, Elet Hall, and Brian Arnold completed Stage 2, with Sean McColl also completing it for Team Europe. Arnold finished with a time of 2:55.57. Rosen finished with a time of 1:48.00. Hall finished with a time of 2:06.32. McColl finished with a time of 1:46.51, the fastest of the season.

==== Leaderboard ====
1	Sean McColl	Completed (1:46.51)
2	Travis Rosen	Completed (1:48.00)
3	Joe Moravsky	Completed (2:03.71)
4	Elet Hall	Completed (2:06.32; previously 1st – 1:51.66 in the National Finals)
5	Brian Arnold	Completed (2:55.57)

==== Stage 3 ====
Yusuke Morimoto made ANW history by becoming the first athlete to ever finish Stage 3 with a time of 5:38.91. Stefano Ghisolfi became the second athlete and first European to finish Stage 3 with a time of 4:46.89. Ryo Matachi followed by becoming the third athlete to complete Stage 3 with a time of 5:04.67. Brian Arnold became the fourth athlete and first American to complete Stage 3 with a time of 4:39.90, the fastest of the four finishers. Arnold's finish moved Team USA into a tie with Team Europe, forcing a climb-off on Stage 4.

==== Leaderboard ====
1	Brian Arnold	Completed (4:39.90)
2	Stefano Ghisolfi	Completed (4:46.89)
3	Ryo Matachi	Completed (5:04.67)
4	Yusuke Morimoto	Completed (5:38.91)

Final Score: Team USA: 9, Team Europe: 9, Team Japan: 0

==== Stage 4 ====
For the first time in ANW history, the athletes competed on Stage 4. Travis Rosen was selected as the first competitor on ANW to attempt the final stage, and he made it all the way up Midoriyama's 90-foot tower with a 77-foot rope with a time of 0:35.77. However, Sean McColl beat Rosen's time by 3/10th of a second (0:00.31), winning the competition for Team Europe as they became the world champions of ANW. Rosen missed on his first attempt at hitting the buzzer at the end of the rope climb.

==== Leaderboard ====
1	Sean McColl	Completed (0:35.46)
2	Travis Rosen	Completed (0:35.77)

Champions: Team Europe

=== USA vs. The World (January 2016) ===
NBC announced that another USA vs. The World matchup would again take place in Las Vegas. It was the third international competition to unite ANW alumni, Sasuke all-stars, and European competitors for the Season 7 finale. The 3-hour special aired on January 31, 2016, on NBC. It was hosted by the current American Ninja Warrior hosts, Matt Iseman, Akbar Gbaja-Biamila, and co-host Kristine Leahy.

=== Rosters ===
Team USA
Isaac Caldiero	Kevin Bull	Joe Moravsky	Geoff Britten	Drew Drechsel	Ian Dory

Team Japan
Kenji Takahashi	Masashi Hioki	Ryo Matachi	Yusuke Morimoto	Tomohiro Kawaguchi

Team Europe
Tim Shieff (England)	Sean McColl (Canada)	Stefano Ghisolfi (Italy)	Tim Champion (England)	Alexander Mars (Sweden)

Team USA	Team Japan	Team Europe
Isaac Caldiero – 33, Las Vegas, NV – American athlete who won the $1 million prize for conquering Mount Midoriyama the fastest in 2015; Kevin Bull ("The Bull") – 31, Scotts Valley, CA – Famous for his inverted dismount on Cannonball Alley during the Venice Beach Finals in Season 6; Joe Moravsky ("The Weatherman") – 26, Sherman, CT – Completed every course he's participated in except Stage 3; Geoff Britten ("Popeye") – 37, Olney, MD – First American ever to defeat Mount Midoriyama and the first "American Ninja Warrior"; Drew Drechsel ("Real Life Ninja") – 26, Fairfield, CT – Only competitor in the competition to have made it to Stage 3 on both Sasuke and American Ninja Warrior; Ian Dory ("Wolf Pup") – 25, Fort Collins, CO – Rock climber who made it to the Flying Bar on Stage 3 in Season 7	Kenji Takahashi ("Kong") – 39, Kawagoe, Japan – Competitor who has only failed Stage 2 once in nine tries; Has made it to Stage 4; Masashi Hioki – 35, Chiba City, Japan – Has made it to the Stage 3 twice; Ryo Matachi ("The Superfan") – 26, Tokyo, Japan – Only competitor to be featured in all USA vs. The World competitions; Reached Stage 4 twice; Third competitor to complete Stage 3 on American soil; Yusuke Morimoto ("The SASUKE Kid") – 23, Tosa, Kōchi, Japan – Returning from the previous USA vs. The World special; First competitor to complete Stage 3 on American soil; Achieved "Total Victory" in Sasuke 31; Tomohiro Kawaguchi ("Tomo") – 33, Tokyo, Japan – Has made it to Stage 4 once	Tim Shieff ("Livewire") – 27, London, England – Returning from last year's USA vs. The World special; Sean McColl – 28, Chambery, France – Returning from last year's USA vs. The World special; Stefano Ghisolfi – 22, Turin, Italy – Returning from last year's USA vs. The World special; Tim Champion – 20, Exeter, England – Made it to Stage 2 on Ninja Warrior UK; Alexander Mars – 28, Stockholm, Sweden – Winner of Ninja Warrior Sweden

=== Overview ===
- There are 3 heats on each stage: 1, 2, and 3.
- In each heat, one athlete from the US, Europe, and Japan will run.
- Stage 1 = 1 point
- Stage 2 = 2 points
- Stage 3 = 3 points
- Stage 4 = Tiebreaker
- A competitor from each team will race side-by-side up the 7-story rope climb of Stage 4 to determine who becomes the world champion.

Obstacles
Stage 1	Stage 2	Stage 3	Stage 4
Piston Road	Rope Jungle	Psycho Chainsaw	75-foot rope climb
Propeller Bar	Double Salmon Ladder	Doorknob Grasper	75-foot rope climb
Silk Slider	Unstable Bridge	Floating Boards	75-foot rope climb
Jumping Spider	Butterfly Wall	Ultimate Cliffhanger	75-foot rope climb
Sonic Curve	Roulette Row	Pole Grasper	75-foot rope climb
Warped Wall	Wall Lift	Hang Climb	75-foot rope climb
Coin Flip	—N/a	Area 51	75-foot rope climb
Flying Triple Swing	—N/a	Flying Bar	75-foot rope climb

=== Results ===
==== Stage 1 ====
Drew Drechsel gets the fastest time of the season with a time of 1:18.61, beating Tim Shieff's time of 1:25.33.

==== Leaderboard ====
Order	Finalist	Outcome	Result
1	Drew Drechsel	Completed	1:18.61 (previously 4th – 1:49.42 in the National Finals)
2	Tim Shieff	Completed	1:25.33
3	Brent Steffensen	Completed	1:38.92
4	Jake Murray	Completed	1:39.78
5	Kevin Bull	Completed	1:40.26
6	Daniel Gil	Completed	1:51.56
7	Joe Moravsky	Completed	1:54.69
8	Jeremiah Morgan	Completed	1:56.24
9	JJ Woods	Completed	1:57.36
10	Mike Meyers	Completed	2:00.23
11	Flip Rodriguez	Completed	2:01.14
12	Dan Yager	Completed	2:02.50
13	Brian Wilczewski	Completed	2:03.66
14	Travis Rosen	Completed	2:04.14
15	Geoff Britten	Completed	2:05.34
16	Lance Pekus	Completed	2:06.34
17	Brian Arnold	Completed	2:07.15
18	Neil Craver	Completed	2:07.16
19	Jo Jo Bynum	Completed	2:07.17
20	Sean Clayton	Completed	2:08.36
21	Isaac Caldiero	Completed	2:09.26
22	Jason Williams	Completed	2:09.78
23	Karson Voiles	Completed	2:11.53
24	Mike Bernardo	Completed	2:11.86
25	Thomas Stillings	Completed	2:13.02
26	Abel Gonzalez	Completed	2:14.50
27	Ryan Stratis	Completed	2:15.21
28	Jamie Rahn	Completed	2:17.22
29	Anthony Scott	Completed	2:19.10
30	Brandon Mears	Completed	2:19.52
31	Grant McCartney	Completed	2:20.41
32	Dustin McKinney	Completed	2:22.52
33	Ian Dory	Completed	2:24.13
34	Nathan Tucker	Completed	2:25.34
35	Kevin Klein	Completed	2:25.44
36	Tremayne Dortch	Completed	2:28.03
37	Pavel Fesyuk	Completed	2:29.01
38	David Yarter	Completed	2:29.48
39	Dustin Rocho	Completed	2:29.53

==== Stage 2 ====
Sean McColl edged out both Drew Drechsel's time of 1:34.46 and Joe Moravsky's time of 1:23.69, beating them with a speedy time of 1:19.86, the fastest of the ANW season.

==== Leaderboard ====
Order	Finalist	Result	Notes
1	Sean McColl	Completed	1:19.86
2	Joe Moravsky	Completed	1:23.69 (previously 4th – 2:09.59 in the National Finals)
3	Drew Drechsel	Completed	1:34.46 (previously 6th – 2:12.48 in the National Finals)
4	Geoff Britten	Completed	2:00.89
5	Kevin Bull	Completed	2:01.10
6	Isaac Caldiero	Completed	2:04.80
7	Jeremiah Morgan	Completed	2:11.23
8	Ian Dory	Completed	2:16.03
9	Abel Gonzalez	Completed	2:20.56

==== Stage 3 ====
Yusuke Morimoto was the only member of Team Japan to finish this stage with a time of 6:29.38. Sean McColl finished with a faster time of 5:42.25, putting Team Europe in the lead. Isaac Caldiero was the last to compete and needed a 3-point win in order to put Team USA on top. Caldiero brought his team to victory with an impressive time of 4:28.84, the fastest of the season, making this the POM Wonderful "Run of the Night".

==== Leaderboard ====
Order	Finalist	Result	Notes
1	Isaac Caldiero	Completed	4:28.84 (previously 1st – 5:13 in the National Finals) (POM Wonderful "Run of the Night")
2	Geoff Britten	Completed	N/A
3	Sean McColl	Completed	5:42.25
4	Yusuke Morimoto	Completed	6:29.38

Final Score: Team USA: 10, Team Europe: 8, Team Japan: 0

Champions: Team USA

=== USA vs. The World (June 2017) ===
The fourth international competition aired on June 4, 2017. Once again, it was hosted by the current American Ninja Warrior hosts, Matt Iseman, Akbar Gbaja-Biamila, and co-host Kristine Leahy. This year, Team USA and Team Europe faced a new challenger; Team Latin America.

=== Rosters ===
Team USA
Drew Drechsel	Daniel Gil	Brian Arnold	Jake Murray	Josh Levin	Jessie Graff

Team Europe
Tim Shieff (England)	Sean McColl (Canada)	Owen McKenzie (England)	Stefano Ghisolfi (Italy)	Alexander Mars (Sweden)	Bjarke Tønnesen (Denmark)

Team Latin America
Danee Marmolejo (Mexico)	Wid Eriksen (Mexico)	Diego Gonzalez (Mexico)	Santiago de Alba (Mexico)	David Saikin (Argentina)	Karl Fow (Venezuela)

Team USA	Team Europe	Team Latin America
Drew Drechsel ("Real Life Ninja") – 27, Fairfield, CT – Team Captain, Gym Owner, only competitor to have made it farther than anyone in both the national finals and Sasuke 32 and 33; Daniel Gil ("Kingdom Ninja") – 23, Houston, TX – Ninja Trainer, one of the fastest competitors in ANW history; Brian Arnold – 38, Brighton, CO – Salesman, ANW veteran; 3rd time in this competition; Jake Murray ("The Wild Man") – 29, Denver, CO – Wedding Photographer, one of the fastest competitors on Stage 1; Josh Levin – 22, Sunnyvale, CA – International Rock Climbing Champion, ANW rookie; Jessie Graff ("Wonder Woman") – 32, Calabasas, CA – Stuntwoman, first female athlete to ever compete in this competition	Tim Shieff ("Livewire") – 28, London, England – Team Captain, holds the record for fastest time on Stage 1; Sean McColl – 28, Chambery, France – #1 Ranked Professional World Rock Climber; Owen McKenzie ("The Stuff") – 32, London, England – Gas Engineer, ANW Rookie; Top finisher on Ninja Warrior UK; Stefano Ghisolfi – 23, Turin, Italy – Top Professional Rock Climber in Europe; Alexander Mars – 29, Stockholm, Sweden – Real Estate Manager, ultimate frisbee competitor, winner of Ninja Warrior Sweden; Bjarke Tønnesen – 24, Copenhagen, Denmark – Graphic Design Student, former Gymnast; Made it to the finals on Denmark's Ninja Warrior	Danee Marmolejo – 24, Mexico City, Mexico – Professional Stuntman, Freerunner; Wid Eriksen – 26, Mexico City, Mexico – Acrobat, Freerunning competitor; Diego Gonzalez – 26, Mexico City, Mexico, – Industrial Engineer, #1 Ranked Rock Climber in Mexico; Santiago De Alba – 23, Mexico City, Mexico – Bouldering Champion of Mexico; David Saikin – 29, Bariloche, Argentina – #1 Ranked Rock Climber in Argentina; Karl Fow – 28, Caracas, Venezuela – Top Professional Freerunner in Venezuela

=== Overview ===
- There are 3 heats on each stage: 1, 2, and 3.
- In each heat, one athlete from the US, Europe, and Latin America will run.
- Stage 1 = 1 point
- Stage 2 = 2 points
- Stage 3 = 3 points
- Stage 4 = Tiebreaker
- A competitor from each team will race side-by-side up the 7-story rope climb of Stage 4 to determine who becomes the world champion.

Obstacles
Stage 1	Stage 2	Stage 3	Stage 4
Snake Run	Giant Ring Swing	Keylock Hang	75-foot rope climb
Propeller Bar	Down Up Salmon Ladder	Floating Boards	75-foot rope climb
Giant Log Grip	Wave Runner	Ultimate Cliffhanger	75-foot rope climb
Jumping Spider	Butterfly Wall	Curved Body Prop	75-foot rope climb
Sonic Curve	Double Wedge	Hang Climb	75-foot rope climb
Warped Wall	Wall Flip	Walking Bar	75-foot rope climb
Broken Bridge	—N/a	Flying Bar	75-foot rope climb
Flying Squirrel	—N/a	—N/a	75-foot rope climb

=== Results ===
==== Stage 1 ====
Daniel Gil and Jake Murray both completed Stage 1 for Team USA, with Owen McKenzie also completing it for Team Europe. Gil finished with a time of 1:47.58. McKenzie finished with a time of 2:38.66. Murray finished with a time of 1:28.43, the fastest of the season.

==== Leaderboard ====
Order	Finalist	Outcome	Result
1	Flip Rodriguez (previously 13th – 2:15.22 in the National Finals), Nicholas Coolridge (previously 8th – 2:11.68 in the National Finals), Jessie Graff (previously 5th – 2:07.61 in the National Finals) (Team Kristine )	Completed	1:18.78
2	Grant McCartney (previously 12th – 2:15.19 in the National Finals) , Neil Craver (previously 6th – 2:08.97 in the National Finals) , Meagan Martin (Team Akbar )	Completed	1:25.42
3	Jake Murray	Completed	1:28.43 (previously 1st – 1:45.25 in the National Finals)
4	Daniel Gil	Completed	1:47.58 (previously 3rd – 2:04.97 in the National Finals)
5	Thomas Stillings	Completed	1:52.44
6	Brian Arnold	Completed	2:05.90
7	Drew Drechsel	Completed	2:11.22
8	Chris Wilczewski	Completed	2:11.78
9	Najee Richardson	Completed	2:11.99
10	Josh Levin	Completed	2:12.24
11	Adam Rayl	Completed	2:15.26
12	Joe Moravsky	Completed	2:15.90
13	Ethan Swanson	Completed	2:17.90
14	Michael Torres	Completed	2:19.92
15	Owen McKenzie	Completed	2:38.66

==== Stage 2 ====
Both Europeans Sean McColl and Stefano Ghisolfi completed Stage 2. McColl finished with a time of 3:20.54, the fastest of the season. Drew Drechsel was supposed to run in the last heat for Team USA, but he decided to give up his spot to Jessie Graff, so he could stay fresh for Stage 3, and after a previous disappointing run on Stage 1, going out on Snake Run, she redeemed herself and became the first woman to complete Stage 2 with a time of 3:49.76, winning the heat for Team USA and making this the POM Wonderful "Run of the Night".

==== Leaderboard ====
Order	Finalist	Outcome	Result
1	Sean McColl	Completed	3:20.54
2	Daniel Gil	Completed	3:26.19
3	Drew Drechsel	Completed	3:28.30
4	Jessie Graff	Completed	3:49.76 (POM Wonderful "Run of the Night")
5	Stefano Ghisolfi	Completed	N/A

==== Stage 3 ====
Josh Levin and Drew Drechsel both completed Stage 3 for Team USA, putting them on a list of only a handful of athletes to do so. Levin finished with a time of 6:41.09. Drechsel was listening to "I’ll Make a Man Out of You" from Disney's Mulan during his run and ultimately won the competition for the Americans.

==== Leaderboard ====
Order	Finalist	Outcome	Result
1	Jessie Graff, Nicholas Coolridge, Flip Rodriguez (Team Kristine )	Completed	5:30.62
2	Josh Levin	Completed	6:41.09
3	Drew Drechsel	Completed	N/A

Final Score: Team USA: 10, Team Europe: 7, Team Latin America: 1

Champions: Team USA

=== USA vs. The World (March 2018) ===
The fifth international competition aired for 3 hours on March 11, 2018. Returning are the current American Ninja Warrior hosts, Matt Iseman, Akbar Gbaja-Biamila, and sideline reporter Kristine Leahy. This year, Team USA (blue), Team Europe (green), and Team Latin America (yellow) faced a new challenger; Team Asia (red).

=== Rosters ===
Team USA
Joe Moravsky	Drew Drechsel	Sean Bryan	Najee Richardson

Team Europe
Sean McColl (Canada)	Alexander Mars (Sweden)	Øssur Eiriksfoss (Denmark)	Sergio Verdasco (Spain)

Team Latin America
Danee Marmolejo (Mexico)	Karl Fow (Venezuela)	Marco Jubes (Venezuela)	Sebastian Prieto (Colombia)

Team Asia
Tomohiro Kawaguchi (Japan)	Yusuke Morimoto (Japan)	Yosua Laskaman Zalukhu ("Yosua Zalukhu") (Indonesia)	Lê Văn Thực ("Thuc Le") (Vietnam)

Team USA	Team Europe	Team Latin America	Team Asia
Joe Moravsky ("The Weatherman") – 28, Monroe, CT – Team Captain, Meteorologist, "Last Man Standing" in Season 9; 3rd time in this competition; Drew Drechsel ("Real Life Ninja") – 28, Hamden, CT – Ninja Gym Owner, had the fastest time on Stage 1 this season; 3rd time in this competition; Sean Bryan ("Papel Ninja") – 32, Berkeley, CA – Catholic Church Worker, one of only three competitors to make it to Stage 3 in Season 9; Najee Richardson ("The Phoenix") – 26, Philadelphia, PA – Fitness Coach, one of only three competitors to make it to Stage 3 in Season 9	Sean McColl – 29, Chambery, France – Team Captain, Pro Rock Climber; 4th time in this competition; Alexander Mars – 30, Stockholm, Sweden – Real Estate Manager, "Last Man Standing" on Ninja Warrior Sweden; 3rd time in this competition; Øssur Eiriksfoss – 27, Torshavn, Faroe Islands – Teacher, Team Ninja Warrior Denmark record holder; Sergio Verdasco – 21, Madrid, Spain – Pro Rock Climber, achieved "Total Victory" on Ninja Warrior Spain	Danee Marmolejo – 25, Mexico City, Mexico – Team Captain, Stuntman, Freerunner; Returning from last year's USA vs. The World special; Karl Fow – 29, Caracas, Venezuela – Pro Freerunner; Returning from last year's USA vs. The World special; Marco Jubes – 34, Caracas, Venezuela – Pro Rock Climber, ANW rookie; Sebastian Prieto – 27, Bogota, Colombia – Graphic Designer, Pro Rock Climber, ANW rookie	Tomohiro Kawaguchi ("Tomo") – 35, Tokyo, Japan – Team Captain, Truck Driver; 2nd time in this competition; Yusuke Morimoto ("The SASUKE Kid") – 25, Osaka, Japan – Software Engineer; 3rd time in this competition; Yosua Zalukhu – 22, Jakarta, Indonesia – Bike Taxi Driver, "Last Man Standing" on Ninja Warrior Indonesia, making it to Stage 4; Thuc Le – 26, Hanoi, Vietnam – Coach, achieved "Total Victory" on Ninja Warrior Vietnam

=== Overview ===
- There are 2 heats on each stage: 1, 2, and 3.
- In each heat on Stages 1 and 2, one athlete from the US, Europe, Latin America, and Asia will run.
- 1st place = 3 points
- 2nd place = 2 points
- 3rd place = 1 point
- 4th place = 0 points
- The three highest scoring teams will move on to Stage 3.
- 1st place = 2 points
- 2nd place = 1 point
- 3rd place = 0 points
- The two highest scoring teams will move on to Stage 4 for a side-by-side climb-off.
- Whoever gets to the top first takes home the title.

Obstacles
Stage 1	Stage 2	Stage 3	Stage 4
Snake Run	Giant Ring Swing	Floating Boards	80-foot rope climb
Propeller Bar	Criss Cross Salmon Ladder	Keylock Hang	80-foot rope climb
Double Dipper	Wave Runner	Nail Clipper	80-foot rope climb
Jumping Spider	Swing Surfer	Ultimate Cliffhanger	80-foot rope climb
Parkour Run	Wingnut Alley	Curved Body Prop	80-foot rope climb
Warped Wall	Wall Flip	Peg Cloud	80-foot rope climb
Domino Pipes	—N/a	Time Bomb	80-foot rope climb
Flying Squirrel	—N/a	Flying Bar	80-foot rope climb

=== Results ===
==== Stage 1 ====
During Heat 1 of Stage 1, Team USA was represented by Joe Moravsky, Team Europe by Øssur Eiriksfoss, Team Latin America by Karl Fow, and Team Asia by Thuc Le. Moravsky fell on the Domino Pipes, while Eiriksfoss fell on the Jumping Spider, and Le fell on the Double Dipper. Fow was the only one to complete the course. Team Latin America won the heat.

During Heat 2 of Stage 1, Team USA was represented by Drew Drechsel, Team Europe by Sergio Verdasco, Team Latin America by Danee Marmolejo, and Team Asia by Tomohiro Kawaguchi. Drechsel, Verdasco, and Marmolejo all finished the course while Kawaguchi fell on the Domino Pipes. Team USA won the heat. At the end of both heats, the points totals were added.

==== Leaderboard ====
Order	Competitor	Outcome	Result
1	Josh Salinas	Finished	1:38.54
2	Daniel Gil	Finished	1:47.04
3	Drew Drechsel	Finished	1:48.44 (previously 1st – 1:33.71 in the National Finals)
4	Lance Pekus	Finished	1:49.52
5	Hunter Guerard	Finished	1:51.16
6	Joe Moravsky	Finished	1:52.24
7	Dave Cavanagh	Finished	1:56.76
8	Nicholas Coolridge	Finished	1:58.18
9	Jamie Rahn	Finished	1:59.77
10	Brent Steffensen	Finished	2:01.34
11	Thomas Stillings	Finished	2:02.12
12	Sergio Verdasco	Finished	2:02.21
13	Matthew Ilgenfritz	Finished	2:03.48
14	Flip Rodriguez	Finished	2:04.34
15	Kevin Bull	Finished	2:07.05
16	Najee Richardson	Finished	2:07.79
17	Jody Avila	Finished	2:08.18
18	Travis Rosen	Finished	2:08.97
19	Tyler Yamauchi	Finished	2:09.53
20	Mike Bernardo	Finished	2:10.10
21	Eric Middleton	Finished	2:11.48
22	Cass Clawson	Finished	2:12.32
23	David Campbell	Finished	2:14.30
24	Adam Rayl	Finished	2:14.60
25	Brian Arnold	Finished	2:15.15
26	Sean Bryan	Finished	2:15.20
27	Michael Silenzi	Finished	2:15.56
28	Tyler Gillett	Finished	2:16.64
29	Nick Kostreski	Finished	2:17.28
30	Abel Gonzalez	Finished	2:17.60
31	JJ Woods	Finished	2:18.27
32	Jon Alexis Jr.	Finished	2:19.40
33	Josh Levin	Finished	2:20.70
34	Karson Voiles	Finished	2:21.10
35	Ryan Stratis	Finished	2:25.34
36	Drew Knapp	Finished	2:26.14
37	Allyssa Beird	Finished	2:26.52
38	Ian Dory	Finished	2:27.66
39	Andrew Lowes	Finished	2:28.32
40	Grant Clinton	Finished	2:28.52
41	Sean Darling-Hammond	Finished	2:28.74
42	Nick Hanson	Finished	2:29.97
43	Danne Marmolejo	Finished	2:53.16
44	Karl Fow	Finished	N/A

==== Stage 2 ====
During Heat 1 of Stage 2, Team USA was represented by Sean Bryan, Team Europe by Alexander Mars, Team Latin America by Marco Jubes, and Team Asia by Yusuke Morimoto. Bryan fell at Wingnut Alley and banged his back, while Mars fell at the Wave Runner. Jubes and Morimoto both fell at the Swing Surfer. Team USA won the heat.

During Heat 2 of Stage 2, Team USA was represented by Najee Richardson, Team Europe by Sean McColl, Team Latin America by Sebastian Prieto, and Team Asia by Yosua Zalukhu. Richardson and McColl both completed the course, while Prieto fell on the Criss Cross Salmon Ladder, and Zalukhu fell on the Wave Runner. As McColl finished fastest, Team Europe won the heat. At the end of both heats, points totals from Stage One and Two were combined, with Team USA leading with 10 points, Team Europe with 6 points, and Team Latin America with 5 points. Team Asia had the fewest points and was eliminated.

==== Leaderboard ====
Order	Competitor	Outcome	Result
1	Sean McColl	Finished	3:22.80
2	Joe Moravsky	Finished	3:34.34
3	Sean Bryan	Finished	3:44.94
4	Najee Richardson	Finished	3:59.03 (previously 2nd – 3:39.71 in the National Finals)

Final Score: Team USA: 10, Team Europe: 6, Team Latin America: 5, Team Asia: 3

==== Stage 3 ====
During Heat 1 of Stage 3, Team USA was represented by Drew Drechsel, Team Europe by Sergio Verdasco, and Team Latin America by Marco Jubes. Drechsel and Verdasco both fell on the Ultimate Cliffhanger, while Jubes fell on the first obstacle, the Floating Boards. Team Europe won the heat, as Verdasco made it to the Ultimate Cliffhanger faster than Team USA's Drechsel.

During Heat 2 of Stage 3, Team USA was represented by Joe Moravsky, Team Europe by Alexander Mars, and Team Latin America by Sebastian Prieto. All three fell on the Ultimate Cliffhanger. However, Team USA won the heat as Moravsky made it to the obstacle faster than Team Europe's Mars. At the end of both heats, the points totals were combined, with Team USA and Team Europe tied with 3 points. Team Latin America had 0 points and was eliminated.

Final Score: Team USA: 3, Team Europe: 3, Team Latin America: 0

==== Stage 4 ====
During Stage 4, Team USA was represented by Sean Bryan, while Team Europe was represented by Sean McColl. In an 80-foot rope climb race to the top of Mount Midoriyama, McColl edged out Bryan with a time of 0:25:93, just faster than Bryan's 0:26:79. Team Europe was then declared champions, earning their second USA vs. The World trophy. That final climb-off was also named the POM Wonderful "Run of the Night".

==== Leaderboard ====
Order	Competitor	Outcome	Result
1	Sean McColl	Finished	0:25.93 (POM Wonderful "Run of the Night")
2	Sean Bryan	Finished	0:26.79

Champions: Team Europe

=== USA vs. The World (January 2019) ===
The sixth international competition aired on January 27, 2019. It featured competitors from the United States, Europe, and for the first time, Australia. Every team had at least one female competitor.

=== Rosters ===
Team USA
Drew Drechsel	Jesse Labreck	Mathis Owhadi	Najee Richardson	Barclay Stockett

Team Europe
Georgia Munroe (England)	Katie McDonnell (England)	Javier Cano (Spain)	Iris Matamoros (Spain)	Oliver Edelmann (Germany)

Team Australia
Ashlin Herbert	Bryson Klein	Ben Polson	Olivia Vivian	Jack Wilson

Team USA	Team Europe	Team Australia
Drew Drechsel ("Real Life Ninja") – 28, Hamden, CT – Team Captain, Gym Owner, $100,000 "Last Ninja Standing" in Season 10; Jesse Labreck ("Flex") – 28, Naperville, IL – Gym Manager, second female athlete to ever compete in this competition; Mathis Owhadi ("The Kid") – 19, Tomball, TX – Business Student, ANW rookie; Najee Richardson ("The Phoenix") – 27, Philadelphia, PA – Motivational Speaker; Returning from the previous USA vs. The World special; Barclay Stockett ("Sparkly Ninja") – 23, Dayton, TX – Gymnastics Coach, third female athlete to ever compete in this competition	Georgia Munroe – 20, London, England – Waitress, "Last Female Competitor Standing" on Ninja Warrior UK, fourth female athlete to ever compete in this competition; Katie McDonnell – 27, London, England – Stuntwoman, 3-time Ninja Warrior UK veteran, fifth female athlete to ever compete in this competition; Javier Cano – 27, Plasencia, Spain – Spanish Rock Climber, Ninja Warrior Spain veteran; Iris Matamoros – 37, Murcia, Spain – P.E. Teacher, Ninja Warrior Spain veteran; Oliver Edelmann – 24, Pfungstadt, Germany – Mechanic, "Last Man Standing" on Ninja Warrior Germany	Ashlin Herbert ("Flashlin") – 24, Melbourne, Australia – Carpenter; Made it to Stage 3 on Australian Ninja Warrior; Bryson Klein – 20 Katoomba, Australia – Engineering Student; Made it to Stage 2 on Australian Ninja Warrior; Ben Polson – 25 Perth, Australia – Music DJ, Australian Ninja Warrior veteran; Olivia Vivian ("Kacy Catanzaro of Australia") – 28 Perth, Australia – Cafe Owner, first woman to hit a buzzer on Australian Ninja Warrior, sixth female athlete to ever compete in this competition; Jack Wilson ("Deadly Ninja") – 25 Mount Isa, Queensland, Australia – Motivational Speaker; Made it to Stage 2 on Australian Ninja Warrior

=== Overview ===
- There are 2 heats on each stage: 1, 2, and 3.
- In each heat, one athlete from the US, Europe, and Australia will run.
- 1st place = 2 points
- 2nd place = 1 point
- 3rd place = 0 points
- The two highest scoring teams will move on to Stage 4 for a side-by-side climb-off.
- Whoever gets to the top first takes home the title.

Obstacles
Stage 1	Stage 2	Stage 3	Stage 4
Archer Alley	Epic Catch & Release	Floating Boards	80-foot rope climb
Propeller Bar	Criss Cross Salmon Ladder	En Garde	80-foot rope climb
Double Dipper	Deja Vu	Crazy Clocks	80-foot rope climb
Jumping Spider	Swing Surfer	Ultimate Cliffhanger	80-foot rope climb
Tire Run	Wingnut Alley	Curved Body Prop	80-foot rope climb
Warped Wall	Water Walls	Peg Cloud	80-foot rope climb
Razor Beams	—N/a	Cane Lane	80-foot rope climb
Twist & Fly	—N/a	Flying Bar	80-foot rope climb

=== Results ===
==== Stage 1 ====
During Stage 1, Heat 1, Team USA's Barclay Stockett set her own record when she completed the course, hitting the buzzer for the very first time. She made ANW history by becoming only the third woman to finish Stage 1 with a time of 3:02.57, earning one point for Team USA. Jack Wilson also completed the course with a time of 2:30.61, earning two points for Team Australia.

During Stage 1, Heat 2, Mathis "Kid" Owhadi, the youngest competitor to ever join Team USA, completed the stage with a blazing time of 1:27.18, earning two points for the Americans. This made it the fastest of the season. Oliver Edelmann and Ashlin Herbert also completed the stage. Edelmann finished with a time of 2:49.36 for Team Europe, and Herbert finished with a time of 2:09.80, earning one point for Team Australia.

==== Leaderboard ====
Order	Competitor	Outcome	Result
1	Mathis "Kid" Owhadi	Finished	1:27.18 (previously 3rd – 1:44.71 in the National Finals)
2	Jake Murray	Finished	1:36.00
3	Drew Drechsel	Finished	1:36.20
4	Daniel Gil	Finished	1:46.65
5	Austin Gray	Finished	1:51.11
6	Drew Knapp	Finished	2:00.32
7	Adam Rayl	Finished	2:01.04
8	Josh Salinas	Finished	2:02.25
9	Tyler Gillett	Finished	2:02.27
10	Najee Richardson	Finished	2:02.86
11	R.J. Roman	Finished	2:03.10
12	Ethan Swanson	Finished	2:03.79
13	Karson Voiles	Finished	2:05.22
14	Sean Bryan	Finished	2:06.05
15	Josh Levin	Finished	2:08.10
16	Hunter Guerard	Finished	2:08.68
17	Ashlin Herbert	Finished	2:08.80
18	Eric Middleton	Finished	2:08.84
19	Lucas Reale	Finished	2:09.20
20	Mike Meyers	Finished	2:10.15
21	Thomas Stillings	Finished	2:10.42
22	Brian Burkhardt	Finished	2:13.11
23	Angel Rodriguez	Finished	2:14.12
24	Jonathan Stevens	Finished	2:14.42
25	Chris Wilczewski	Finished	2:15.29
26	Dan Polizzi	Finished	2:15.93
27	Nicholas Coolridge	Finished	2:16.87
28	Jamie Rahn	Finished	2:17.93
29	Mike Murray	Finished	2:19.60
30	Zach Day	Finished	2:20.09
31	Casey Suchocki	Finished	2:20.51
32	Jack Wilson	Finished	2:30.61
33	Oliver Edelmann	Finished	2:49.36
34	Barclay Stockett	Finished	3:02.57

==== Stage 2 ====
During Stage 2, Heat 1, Najee Richardson completed the course with a time of 3:50.86, earning one point for Team USA. Bryson Klein also completed the course with a time of 3:42.83, earning two points for Team Australia.

During Stage 2, Heat 2, Jesse "Flex" Labreck made ANW history when she not only completed the stage, but finished it with the fastest time than the other ninjas in her heat, earning two points for Team USA. Labreck is only the second woman to achieve this feat, following in the footsteps of stuntwoman Jessie Graff from two years ago.

==== Leaderboard ====
Order	Competitor	Outcome	Result
1	Bryson Klein	Finished	3:42.83
2	Najee Richardson	Finished	3:50.86
3	Drew Drechsel	Finished	3:51.35
4	Sean Bryan	Finished	4:08.30
5	Jesse Labreck	Finished	N/A

==== Stage 3 ====
During Stage 3, Drew Drechsel made it the furthest out of the other ninjas in his heat by making it all the way to the second to last obstacle, Cane Lane, earning two points for Team USA and eliminating Team Europe.

Final Score: Team USA: 8, Team Australia: 6, Team Europe: 1

==== Stage 4 ====
During Stage 4, it was Drew Drechsel of Team USA vs. Ashlin Herbert of Team Australia to rope climb the 80-foot tower of Mt. Midoriyama. Despite Herbert's team putting a bucket of beer at the top for extra motivation, it was Drechsel who completed the climb in a time of 0:33.43 seconds, winning it for Team USA.

==== Leaderboard ====
Order	Competitor	Outcome	Result
1	Drew Drechsel	Finished	0:33.43
2	Ashlin Herbert	Finished	0:57.90

Champions: Team USA

=== USA vs. The World (January 2020) ===
The seventh international competition aired on January 26, 2020. It featured competitors from the United States, Europe, and Australia. Every team had one female competitor.

The Australian premiere broadcast was heavily edited to remove most of the footage of Drew Drechsel; due to current US legal proceedings.

=== Rosters ===
Team USA
Drew Drechsel	Jesse Labreck	Daniel Gil	Adam Rayl	Karsten Williams	Michael Torres

Team Europe
Thomas Hubener (France)	Steffi Noppinger (Austria)	Kesu Ahmed (Romania)	Anton Fomenko (Russia)	Damir Okanovic (Bosnia)	Magnus Midtbø (Norway)

Team Australia
Bryson Klein	Olivia Vivian	Daniel Mason	Josh O’Sullivan	Cam D’Silva	Matt Tsang

Team USA	Team Europe	Team Australia
Drew Drechsel ("Real Life Ninja") – 31, Hamden, CT – Gym Owner; American athlete who won the $1 million prize for conquering Mount Midoriyama the fastest in 2019; Jesse Labreck ("Flex") – 29, Naperville, IL – Gym Manager; Returning from the previous USA vs. The World special; Daniel Gil ("Kingdom Ninja") – 26, Houston, TX – Worship Leader, one of only two competitors to finish Stage 3 in Season 11; Adam Rayl ("Be Rock Solid") – 26, Phoenix, AZ – Concrete Worker; Made it to Stage 3 in Season 11; Karsten Williams ("The Big Kat") – 38, Fairview, TX – Ninja Coach; Made it to Stage 3 in Season 11; Michael Torres ("Babyface Ninja") – 24, Mount Prospect, IL – Gym Manager; Made it to Stage 3 in Season 11	Thomas Hubener – 31, Antibes, France – Acrobat, Ninja Warrior France veteran; Steffi Noppinger – 26, Salzburg, Austria – Professional Skier, Ninja Warrior Austria veteran, seventh female athlete to ever compete in this competition; Kesu Ahmed – 23, Bucharest, Romania – Musician, Ninja Warrior Romania veteran; Anton Fomenko – 30, Moscow, Russia – Gymnastics Coach, Russian Ninja Warrior veteran; Damir Okanovic ("American Dream Ninja") – 33, Velika Kladuša, Bosnia – Gym Manager, ANW veteran; Magnus Midtbo – 31, Oslo, Norway – YouTube Star, ANW rookie	Bryson Klein – 22, Katoomba, Australia – College Student; Returning from last year's USA vs. The World special; Olivia Vivian ("Kacy Catanzaro of Australia") – 30, Perth, Australia – Team Captain, Cafe Owner, first woman to hit a buzzer on Australian Ninja Warrior; Returning from last year's USA vs. The World special; Daniel Mason ("Barefoot Ninja") – 28, Healesville, Victoria, Australia – Osteopath; Made it to Stage 3 on Australian Ninja Warrior; Josh O'Sullivan ("Modern Mowgli") – 28, Cronulla, New South Wales, Australia – Arborist; Made it to Stage 3 on Australian Ninja Warrior; Cam D'Silva ("Little Diesel") – 20, Perth, Australia – Diesel Mechanic, ANW rookie; Matt Tsang – 24, Sydney, Australia – Graduate Student, ANW rookie

=== Overview ===
- There are 3 heats on Stage 1, 2 heats on Stage 2, and 1 heat on Stage 3.
- In each heat, one athlete from the US, Europe, and Australia will run.
- 1st place = 2 points on Stage 1, 3 points on Stage 2, and 5 points on Stage 3.
- 2nd place = 1 point on Stage 1, 2 points on Stage 2, and 3 points on Stage 3.
- 3rd place = 0 points on Stage 1, 1 point on Stage 2, and 1 point on Stage 3.
- The two highest scoring teams will move on to Stage 4 for a side-by-side climb-off.
- Whoever gets to the top first takes home the title.

Obstacles
Stage 1	Stage 2	Stage 3	Stage 4
Archer Alley	Giant Walk the Plank	Grip & Tip	75-foot rope climb
Spin Your Wheels	Extension Ladder	Iron Summit	75-foot rope climb
Double Dipper	Snap Back	Crazy Clocks	75-foot rope climb
Jumping Spider	Swing Surfer	Ultimate Cliffhanger	75-foot rope climb
Tire Run	Grim Sweeper	Pipe Dream	75-foot rope climb
Warped Wall	Water Walls	Cane Lane	75-foot rope climb
Diving Boards	—N/a	Flying Bar	75-foot rope climb
Twist & Fly	—N/a	—N/a	75-foot rope climb

=== Results ===
==== Stage 1 ====
During Stage 1, Heat 1, Olivia Vivian made ANW history when she became the first female international competitor to hit the buzzer. This made her only the fourth woman overall to finish Stage 1. Her time was 2.56.26, earning one point for Team Australia. Michael Torres also finished Stage 1 with a time of 1:42.36, earning two points for Team USA.

During Stage 1, Heat 2, Adam Rayl finished Stage 1 with a time of 1:52.50, earning two points for Team USA.

During Stage 1, Heat 3, Jesse "Flex" Labreck became the fifth woman to finish Stage 1, earning two points for Team USA.

==== Leaderboard ====
Rank	Competitor	Outcome	Result
1	Mathis "Kid" Owhadi	Finished	1:38.22
2	Michael Torres	Finished	1:42.36 (previously 12th – 2:12.32 in the National Finals)
3	Ethan Swanson	Finished	1:48.73
4	Daniel Gil	Finished	1:49.46
5	Adam Rayl	Finished	1:52.50 (previously 4th – 1:52.24 in the National Finals)
6	Tyler Smith	Finished	1:53.19
7	Josh Salinas	Finished	1:57.95
8	Lucas Reale	Finished	2:01.03
9	Tyler Gillett	Finished	2:02.45
10	Drew Drechsel	Finished	2:09.75
11	Joe Moravsky	Finished	2:10.19
12	Kevin Carbone	Finished	2:11.14
13	Hunter Guerard	Finished	2:12.70
14	Dave Cavanagh	Finished	2:14.57
15	Flip Rodriguez	Finished	2:16.37
16	Alex Blick	Finished	2:18.42
17	Nate Burkhalter	Finished	2:18.99
18	Ben Wales	Finished	2:19.78
19	Karsten Williams	Finished	2:19.92
20	Ryan Stratis	Finished	2:20.34
21	Chris DiGangi	Finished	2:21.90
22	R.J. Roman	Finished	2:22.05
23	Dan Polizzi	Finished	2:22.15
24	Seth Rogers	Finished	2:22.60
25	Grant McCartney	Finished	2:23.44
26	Karson Voiles	Finished	2:24.41
27	Lorin Ball	Finished	2:25.27
28	Casey Suchocki	Finished	2:25.66
29	Olivia Vivian	Finished	2:56.26
30	Jesse Labreck	Finished	N/A

==== Stage 2 ====
During Stage 2, Heat 1, Daniel Gil finished Stage 2 with a time of 2:24.47, earning three points for Team USA.

During Stage 2, Heat 2, Bryson Klein finished Stage 2 with a time of 2:02.39, earning three points for Team Australia.

==== Leaderboard ====
Rank	Competitor	Outcome	Result
1	Josh Salinas	Finished	1:56.20
2	Tyler Smith	Finished	1:57.33
3	Bryson Klein	Finished	2:02.39
4	Ethan Swanson	Finished	2:05.40
5	Joe Moravsky	Finished	2:11.93
6	Daniel Gil	Finished	2:24.47 (previously 1st – 1:54.43 in the National Finals)
7	Karsten Williams	Finished	2:23.62
8	Tyler Gillett	Finished	2:23.68
9	Drew Drechsel	Finished	2:24.66
10	Kevin Carbone	Finished	2:28.44
11	Adam Rayl	Finished	2:29.20
12	Hunter Guerard	Finished	2:31.06
13	Chris DiGangi	Finished	2:31.64
14	Casey Suchocki	Finished	2:35.97
15	Lucas Reale	Finished	2:36.27
16	Ryan Stratis	Finished	2:43.69
17	Seth Rogers	Finished	2:44.73
18	Michael Torres	Finished	2:48.14
19	R.J. Roman	Finished	2:48.19
20	Mathis Owhadi	Finished	2:48.47
21	Karson Voiles	Finished	2:50.28
22	Nate Burkhalter	Finished	2:58.04

==== Stage 3 ====
During Stage 3, despite injuring his left hand and wrist, Drew Drechsel muscled through and completed the course, earning five points for Team USA and eliminating Team Europe.

==== Leaderboard ====
Order	Finalist	Outcome
1	Drew Drechsel	Finished (previously 2nd – 7:36.95 in the National Finals)
2	Daniel Gil	Finished (7:35.13)

Final Score: Team USA: 16, Team Australia: 8, Team Europe: 6

==== Stage 4 ====
During Stage 4, Adam Rayl of Team USA climbed against Bryson Klein of Team Australia. Klein made it up the rope faster and won it for Team Australia, their first championship in only two appearances.

==== Leaderboard ====
Order	Finalist	Outcome	Notes
1	Bryson Klein	Finished	0:26.43
2	Drew Drechsel	Total Victory	0:28.46
3	Adam Rayl	Finished	N/A

Champions: Team Australia

== Ratings ==
Special	Time slot (ET)	Original air date	Viewership (millions)	18–49		Source
Special	Time slot (ET)	Original air date	Viewership (millions)	Rating	Share	Source
USA vs. Japan	Monday 8:00 pm	January 13, 2014	5.54	1.9	5	
USA vs. The World	Monday 8:00 pm	September 15, 2014	5.21	1.9	6	
USA vs. The World	Sunday 8:00 pm	January 31, 2016	4.55	1.4	5	
USA vs. The World	Sunday 8:00 pm	June 4, 2017	4.22	1.1	4	
USA vs. The World	Sunday 8:00 pm	March 11, 2018	3.57	0.9	3	
USA vs. The World	Sunday 9:00 pm	January 27, 2019	2.83	0.7	3	
USA vs. The World	Sunday 9:00 pm	January 26, 2020	2.17	0.4	2	
