= Francesco Ippolito =

Italian engineer (born 1994)

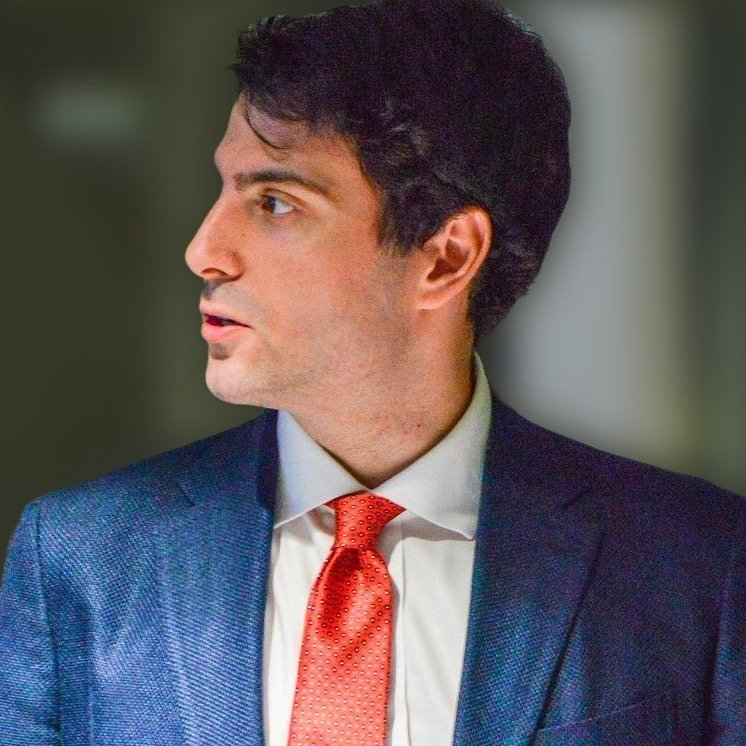
- Born: 23 November 1994; Foggia, Italy
- Education: Polytechnic University of Bari
- Occupations: Civil engineer, structural engineer, geotechnical engineer, journalist, writer
- Notable credit: Corriere dello Sport

Francesco Ippolito (born 23 November 1994) is an Italian civil, structural and geotechnical engineer, journalist, and writer. As an engineer, he works in the fields of structural and geotechnical engineering, with a specialization in mechanized tunnelling. He is also known for his contributions to engineering, science communication, and sports journalism.

== Biography ==
=== Early life and education ===
Born in Foggia in 1994, Ippolito displayed an early interest in both journalism and engineering. As a young writer, he contributed to publications such as Calcio 2000, Calciomercato.com, and the Apulian edition of Corriere dello Sport, where he continues to write as a correspondent from Foggia, covering the Foggia football team. He earned a bachelor's degree in civil engineering and environmental engineering at the Polytechnic University of Bari, with a thesis examining building collapses, focusing particularly on structural failures and on the 1999 collapse of the Viale Giotto building in Foggia. He subsequently completed a master's degree in structural engineering at the same institution, graduating with honors. His research included an exploration of machine learning applications for the automatic detection of damage in bridges.

=== Career ===
==== Engineering ====
Francesco Ippolito began his professional career in the field of bridge and structural design. He later specialized in geotechnical engineering, underground works and mechanized tunnelling. He is currently involved with Webuild and Impresa Pizzarotti & C. S.p.A. in high-speed rail infrastructure, including the Naples-Bari high-speed railway project, specifically on the Bovino-Orsara and Hirpinia-Orsara sections. In this context, he works as a structural and geotechnical engineer with a specialization in TBM and mechanized excavation. Thanks to his expertise in mechanized tunnelling and his experience in technical and scientific communication, in 2025 he was appointed to the Young Members Board of the Italian Tunnelling Society, the leading national technical and scientific body for the underground construction sector in Italy.

==== Science communication ====
Ippolito is recognized for his efforts in promoting STEM fields through accessible explanations of engineering concepts. In 2024, he was ranked as the leading STEM creator in Italy on LinkedIn, where he discusses topics such as bridge and tunnel construction.

==== Authorship ====
Ippolito has written extensively about the history of Inter's football jerseys, reconstructing the historical evolution of the team's jerseys, combining over a thousand detailed illustrations with stories and curiosities that highlight their cultural and historical significance. His first book, Orgoglio Nerazzurro: La storia della maglia dell'Inter, was published in 2016 and updated in 2019. This book provided an illustrated evolution of Nerazzurri jerseys.

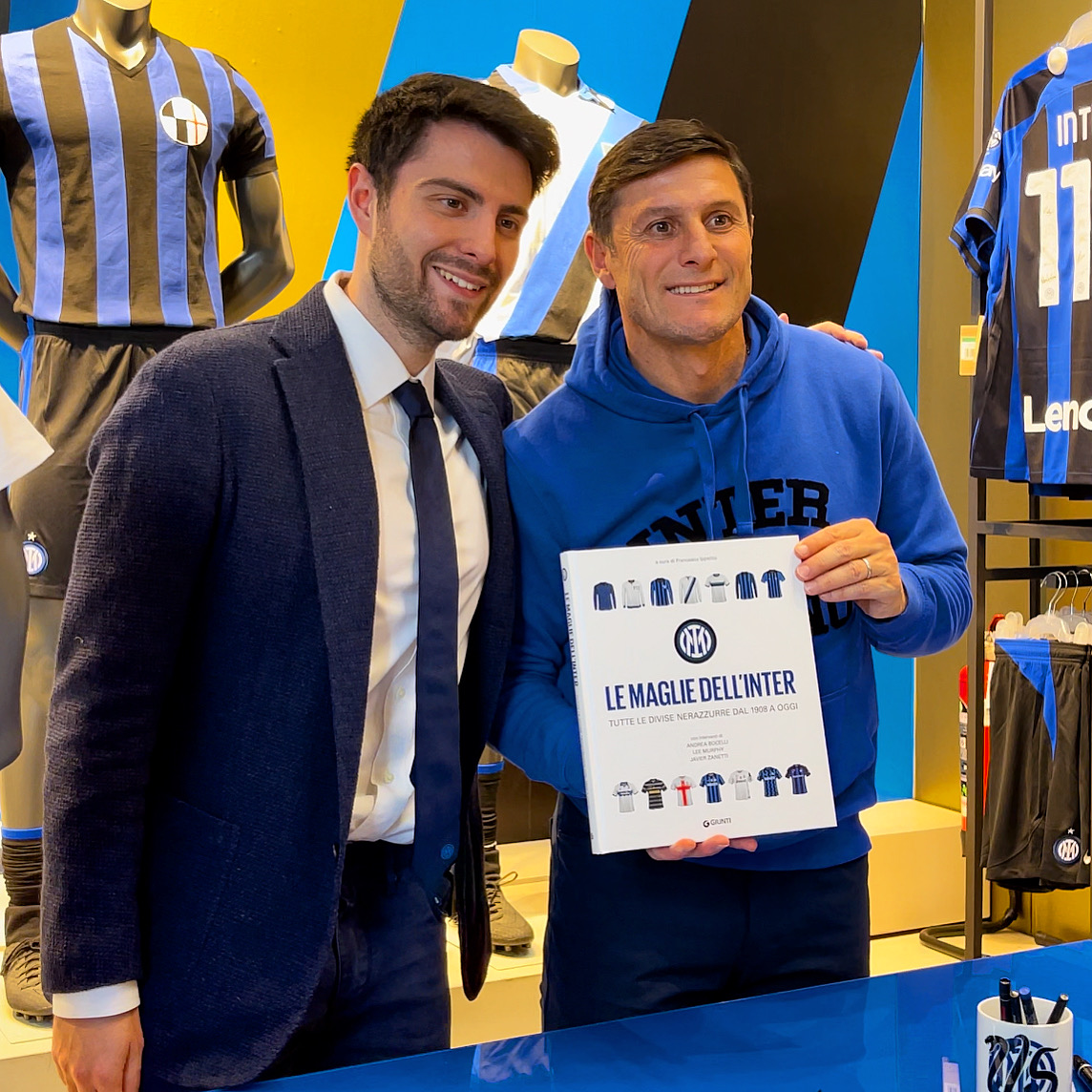
Francesco Ippolito and Javier Zanetti at the presentation of the book Le maglie dell'Inter in 2023

In 2023, he published Le maglie dell'Inter: Tutte le divise nerazzurre dal 1908 a oggi, an official and comprehensive encyclopedia of the team's jerseys, featuring contributions from figures such as Javier Zanetti and Andrea Bocelli. Le maglie dell'Inter features every jersey design since the club's foundation, accompanied by historical context and anecdotes: the volume not only chronicles the history of all Inter jerseys, including home, away, third kits, additional variations and goalkeeper uniforms, but also explores the history of competition and commemorative patches on sleeves, the evolution of the club's logos, advancements in fabric technology, the story of the mixed selection team with AC Milan, and the history of training and pre-match jerseys. The book reached bestseller status, ranking among the top-selling books in Italy and surpassing Prince Harry's memoir Spare on its release day. The book has also been translated into English under the title The Jerseys of Inter. All the Black-and-Blue uniforms from 1908 to today.

In 2025, he published the second edition of the book, updated to include the current season, the first featuring two stars above Inter's crest. The new edition incorporated additional research concerning previous decades, a greater number of previously unpublished photographs, and further detailed descriptions of each jersey and historical context. The preface of the second edition was written by Inter president Giuseppe Marotta, who highlighted the significance of the club's achievement in earning the second star and its official addition to the team's shirts.

== Bibliography ==
- Ippolito, Francesco (2016). Orgoglio nerazzurro. La storia della maglia dell'Inter (in Italian) (1st ed.). Empoli: Geo Edizioni. ISBN 978-8869990670.
- Ippolito, Francesco (2019). Orgoglio nerazzurro. La storia della maglia dell'Inter (in Italian) (2nd ed.). Empoli: Geo Edizioni. ISBN 978-8869990984.
- Ippolito, Francesco (2023). Le maglie dell'Inter. Tutte le divise nerazzurre dal 1908 a oggi (in Italian). Foreword of Javier Zanetti, afterword of Andrea Bocelli (1st ed.). Florence: Giunti Editore. ISBN 978-8809975705.
- Ippolito, Francesco (2023). The Jerseys of Inter. All the Black-and-Blue Uniforms from 1908 to today. Foreword of Javier Zanetti, afterword of Andrea Bocelli (1st ed.). Florence: Giunti Editore. ISBN 978-8809932289.
- Ippolito, Francesco (2025). Le maglie dell'Inter. Tutte le divise nerazzurre dal 1908 a oggi (in Italian). Foreword of Javier Zanetti and Giuseppe Marotta, afterword of Andrea Bocelli (2nd ed.). Florence: Giunti Editore. ISBN 979-1223203354.
