= Magnus Midtbø =

Norwegian rock climber

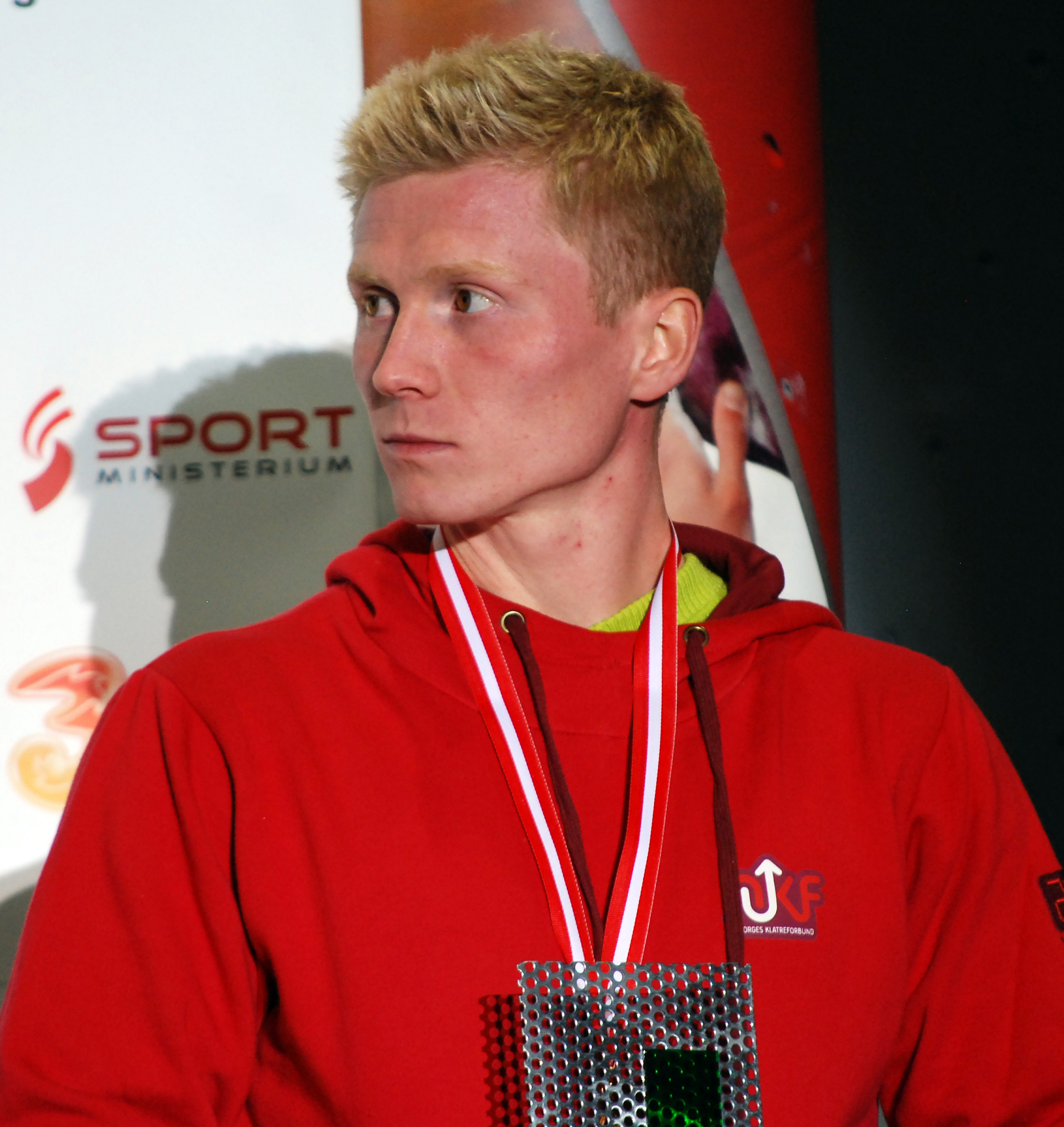
- Midtbø in 2010

Personal information
- Full name: Magnus Rognan Midtbø
- Born: 18 September 1988 (age 38) Bergen, Norway
- Height: 174 cm (5 ft 9 in)
- Weight: 71 kg (157 lb)

Climbing career
- Type of climber: Competition climbing; Sport climbing; Bouldering
- Highest grade: Redpoint: 9a+ (5.15a); Onsight/Flash: 8c+ (5.14c); Bouldering: 8B+ (V14)
Medal record
Men's competition climbing
Representing Norway
World Games
Bronze medal – third place	2013 Cali	Lead
World Cup (Individual Legs)
Bronze medal – third place	2011 Chamonix Leg	Lead
Bronze medal – third place	2012 Kranj Leg	Lead

YouTube information
- Channel: Magnus Midtbø
- Years active: 2011–present
- Genres: Climbing, Vlog, Sport
- Subscribers: 3.63 million
- Views: 710.4 million
- Last updated: August 10, 2026

Magnus Rognan Midtbø (born 18 September 1988) is a Norwegian rock climber, former competition climber, and YouTube video blogger. He was born in Bergen, Norway. He retired from competition climbing in 2017.

== Climbing career ==
=== Rock climbing ===
Midtbø started climbing in 2000 after his mother enrolled him in a class. After just one year of climbing, he won the Norwegian Youth Championship, and a year later, in 2002, he on-sighted his first 8a (5.13b) sport climbing route Øgletryne at the Sageveggen rock wall, near Bergen.

In August 2010, he completed the route Ali Hulk sit start extension in Rodellar, Spain. The first ascent was made by Daniel Andrada in 2007. The grade was initially proposed at 9b (5.15b), but was later downgraded to 9a+/b, and then further to 9a (5.14d) in 2023.

In May 2016, Midtbø returned to Rodellar to on-sight the sport climbing route Cosi fan tutte which is graded at 8c+ (5.14c). As of April 2013, the highest-ever climbing grade to be on-sighted is just one grade higher at 9a (5.14d). In March 2015, he redpointed Papichulo at Oliana at 9a+ (5.15a).

=== Competition climbing ===
In 2006, Midtbø won the World Youth Championships in Beijing, China. After graduating from high school in 2007, Midtbø moved to Innsbruck, Austria, where he trained with other leading competition climbers including David Lama, Jakob Schubert, and Anna Stöhr. Midtbø was particularly impressed by Lama.

Midtbø retired from competitive climbing in May 2016, saying: "I still get motivated just by climbing. I think some people need a specific goal, but I’ve never felt like I needed one. I mean it sounds really cheesy, I know. 'I just love climbing. I love being in the nature. I love the feeling of feeling free,' but it is like that you know. I don’t know. I like the whole lifestyle, I like travelling, I like climbing, I like trying hard, and most of all, I like the feeling of feeling really fit and strong, the feeling of being able to climb anything."

== Media career ==
Midtbø runs an eponymous YouTube channel, which has over 3.7 million subscribers as of September 2026.

In 2013, Magnus Midtbø participated in a German TV show Der Deutsche Meister (the German Champion) as the international contestant in the Reckstangenklettern (salmon ladder) challenge. Midtbø beat the German contestant.

In 2016, Midtbø was criticized for publishing a picture of himself hanging off the Trolltunga rock formation in Norway. He was wearing a safety harness but local police officers were concerned the stunt might inspire others to replicate it without taking proper safety precautions.

In January 2020, Midtbø represented Team Europe in American Ninja Warrior: USA vs. The World.

In 2021, Midtbø competed in the 12th season of the reality show Mesternes mester, where he finished third. In 2022, he also competed in the first season of Forræder, the Norwegian version of The Traitors, in which he was banished during the finale.

In 2022, Midtbø uploaded one of his most viral videos where he documented his experience free solo climbing with Alex Honnold.

In December 2024 and February 2025, Midtbø released two videos filmed with the French Foreign Legion. In the first he took part in the unit's mountain commando selection alongside serving candidates. He finished outside the time limit on the initial timed run but recorded the best result among participants on the 27-kilometre march. In the second he joined recruits during the closing phase of their basic training, completing sea swims, obstacle courses and a via ferrata course, and was presented with a medal at the ceremony marking the end of the selection. Midtbø described himself as the "first civilian" to receive the award, adding that he would be "first and last".

== Personal life ==
His sister, Hannah Midtbø (born 1990), is also a professional climber. She won the Nordic Championships (NM) in the lead climbing discipline in 2006 and has been a bouldering competitor at various IFSC World Cups and European Championships.

== Rankings ==
=== World Games ===
World Games record:

Discipline	2013 Cali
Lead	3

=== Number of medals in the IFSC Climbing World Cup ===
IFSC Climbing World Cup

==== Lead ====
Season	Gold	Silver	Bronze	Total
2011			1	1
2012			1	1
Total	0	0	2	2

=== USA Climbing ===
USA Climbing

Discipline	2010	2011
Lead	1	1

=== IFSC Climbing World Youth Championships ===
IFSC Climbing World Youth Championships

Discipline	2005 Youth A
Lead	1

=== Number of medals in the Climbing European Youth Cup / Series ===
==== Lead ====
European Youth Cup Winner: 2005, 2006, 2007

Season	Category	Gold	Silver	Bronze	Total
2003	Youth B		1		1
2004	Youth A	1			1
2005	Youth A	3	2		5
2006	Junior	3			3
2007	Junior	4	1		5
Total		11	4	0	15

=== Scandinavia ===
- Nordic champion 7 years in a row (2005–2011)
- Norwegian champion 11 years in a row (2005–2015)
