= Via Giotto in Foggia building collapse =

1999 building collapse

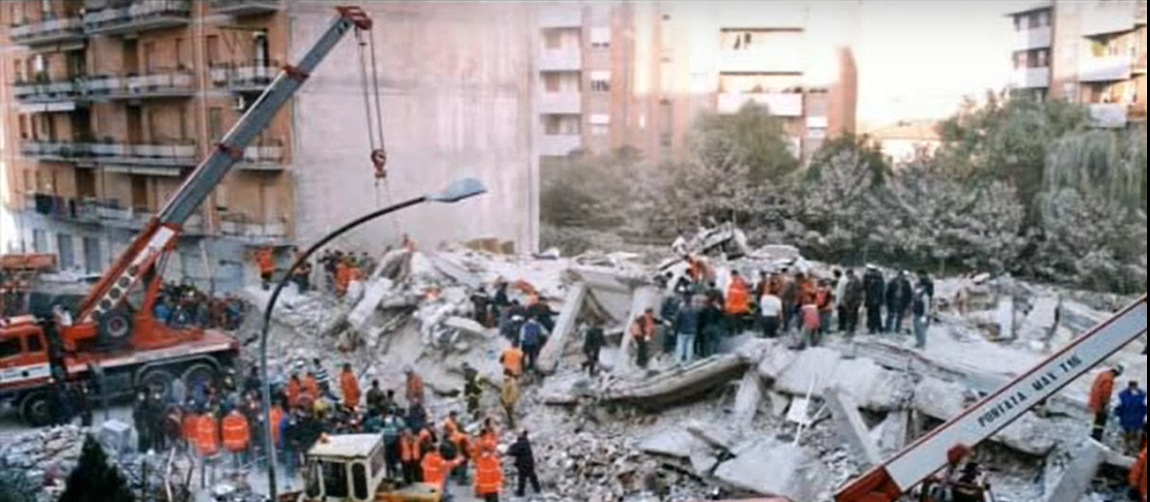
- The building after the collapse
- Date: Thursday, 11 November 1999
- Location: Foggia, Italy
- Deaths: 67
- Injuries: 3

The Viale Giotto 120 Building collapse was a building collapse which occurred in Foggia, Italy in the early morning of 11 November 1999. The building was an apartment complex with 26 flats, at the time less than 30 years old. 71 people lived in the building; 67 people were killed.

== Collapse ==
The six-story apartment building, located in the southern outskirts of Foggia, suffered a structural failure and imploded with few immediate warning signs: the whole collapse, registered by the seismographs of the Specola Nigri Institute, lasted only 19 seconds.

First reports from the rescuers stated that 80 people could be buried under the rubble. The first responders succeeded in saving nine survivors, most of whom resided on the top floors. One family, who had heard strange noises and tried to alert the property manager and the neighbours, escaped the building shortly before the final collapse and was found shocked but in good shape.

Due to the likely presence of people under the rubble, excavators could not help the rescue. Vigili del Fuoco, volunteers and townspeople worked all night long to remove the debris, aided by search dogs and geophones.

A fire broke out in the cellars of the building, where some mattresses were stored. Thick smoke covered the stricken area, impairing rescue operations and likely killing some of the survivors still under the debris. Autopsies later found that most of the victims died of asphyxia within the first two minutes of the collapse, from a combination of dust and smoke.

The last survivor was recovered around 11 pm on November 11, while dozens of bodies were still under the rubble. Two days later a public mass was held in the city fairgrounds, where the bodies were stored.

== Inquiry ==
A number of suppositions were advanced for the failure. Early speculations about a gas explosion were quickly dismissed. One focus was on enlargement of the underground car parking - it was supposed that some main pillars were cut or removed by the builders combined with heavy rains of the previous days, and the geological conditions of the land under the building, rendered the structure unsafe.

Some victims' relatives said that since the previous August some "squeaks" and noises had been reported in the structure, and misalignment of doors and windows was becoming a common concern. The first reports of potential structural concerns dated back to two full years before the tragedy, and were followed by a technical survey, leading to no remarks.

The final cause was determined to be poor workmanship and materials of the original build. The building was erected during the economic boom, a period where Italy experienced fast growth of cities and industries, and the rebuilding after World War II was still going on. The enormous demand for new houses led inexperienced builders to the business, and prompted them to cut corners on material quality and reinforcement techniques, to cut cost and increase margins in order to remain competitive. The legacy of those practices is still a source of problems, and was a major cause of death in the 2009 L'Aquila earthquake.

The builders were brothers Delli Carri, who lived in a penthouse at the top floor. Both died in the tragedy. The engineer who designed the structures, Mr. Inglese, died a few years before the collapse.

The inquiry was officially closed on 21 March 2007, and confirmed that the causes were to be found exclusively in the poor building materials used for the structural cage.

== Aftermath ==
People in Foggia developed a strong civic feeling in the days after the tragedy. President Carlo Azeglio Ciampi visited the city, and at their request met with victims' relatives. He later spoke to the press.

The disaster led to modifications in laws requiring assessment of old buildings and new guarantees for new ones.

The total body count was of 67 deceased. A monument was placed in the Foggia graveyard to remember the tragedy, and on the 10th anniversary a square was dedicated to the victims.
