= Tom Durager =

French lifesaver

Personal information
- Born: 7 July 2005 (age 20)

Sport
- Country: France
- Sport: Lifesaving
Medal record
Men's Lifesaving
Representing France
World Games
Gold medal – first place	2025 Chengdu	100 m manikin carry with fins
Bronze medal – third place	2025 Chengdu	4x50 m medley
World Championships
Gold medal – first place	2024 Gold Coast	4×50 m medley
Bronze medal – third place	2024 Gold Coast	100 m manikin tow with fins
Bronze medal – third place	2024 Gold Coast	Rescue tube rescue
Bronze medal – third place	2024 Gold Coast	Beach relay

Tom Durager (born 7 July 2005) is a French lifesaver. He competed at the 2025 World Games, winning the gold medal in the men's 100 m manikin carry with fins event.
