= United States at the 2013 World Games =

- IOC code: USA

in Cali, Colombia 25 July 2013 – 4 August 2013
- Medals Ranked 6th: Gold 11 Silver 4 Bronze 4 Total 19

World Games appearances (overview)
- 1981; 1985; 1989; 1993; 1997; 2001; 2005; 2009; 2013; 2017; 2022; 2025

The United States competed at the 2013 World Games held in Cali, Colombia.

== Medalists ==
| Medal | Name | Sport | Event |
|---|---|---|---|
| Gold | Reo Wilde | Archery | Men's compound |
| Gold | Erika Jones | Archery | Women's compound |
| Gold | Reo Wilde; Erika Jones | Archery | Mixed team compound |
| Silver | Brady Ellison | Archery | Men's recurve |
| Bronze | Cheryl Murphy | Karate | Women's kumite 68 kg |
| Bronze | Rocky Carson | Racquetball | Men's singles |
| Bronze | Rhonda Rajsich | Racquetball | Women's singles |

== Air sports ==
Two medals were won in air sports.

At the 2013 World Games in Cali, Colombia, the United States won two medals in air sports, both in parachuting canopy piloting. Curtis Bartholomew won the gold medal, while Thomas Dellibac won the silver medal in the same event. The competition was held from August 1–3 and involved nine rounds of canopy-piloting events. The United States entered six competitors and finished first in the air-sports medal standings with one gold and one silver medal.

== Archery ==
Three golds medals and one silver medal were won in archery.

Reo Wilde and Erika Jones respectively won the gold medal in the men's compound and women's compound events. They also won the gold medal in the mixed team compound event. Brady Ellison won the silver medal in the men's recurve event.

== Karate ==
Cheryl Murphy won the bronze medal in the women's kumite 68 kg event.
