= France at the 2013 World Games =

- IOC code: FRA

World Games appearances
- 1981; 1985; 1989; 1993; 1997; 2001; 2005; 2009; 2013; 2017; 2022

France competed at the 2013 World Games held in Cali, Colombia.from July 25 to August 4, 2013.The World Games is an international multi-sport event featuring non-Olympic sports.

== Medalists ==
Medal	Name	Sport	Event
Gold	Jean-Charles Valladont	Archery	Men's field recurve
Gold	Benjamin GARAVEL	Gymnastics	Men's Individual Aerobics
Gold	Gregory Gaultier	Squash	Men's Singles
Gold	Sandy Scordo	Karate	Women's kata
Gold	Lucie Ignace	Karate	Women's kumite 55 kg
Gold	Camille Heitz	Underwater Sports	Women's Apnoea 50m Finswimming
Gold	Magali Rousseau	Life Saving	Women's 50m Manikin Carry
Gold	Justine Weyders	Life Saving	Women's 100m Manikin Tow with Fins
Gold	Magali Rousseau	Life Saving	Women's 200m Super Lifesaver
Gold	Clementine Lucine	Waterski & Wakeboard	Women's Tricks
Silver	Pierre-Julien Deloche	Archery	Men's compound
Silver	Alexandra Recchia	Karate	Women's kumite 50 kg
Silver	Nadège Aït-Ibrahim	Karate	Women's kumite +68 kg

== Archery ==
Jean-Charles Valladont won the gold medal in the men's field recurve event and Pierre-Julien Deloche won the silver medal in the men's compound event.

== Karate ==
In total two gold medals and two silver medals were won by French karateka.

Sandy Scordo won the gold medal in the women's kata event and Lucie Ignace won the gold medal in the women's kumite 55 kg event.

Alexandra Recchia won the silver medal in the women's kumite 50 kg event and Nadège Aït-Ibrahim won the silver medal in the women's kumite +68 kg event.
