= Italy at the 2013 World Games =

- IOC code: ITA

in Cali, Colombia 25 July 2013 – 4 August 2013
- Medals: Gold 17 Silver 13 Bronze 15 Total 45

World Games appearances (overview)
- 1981; 1985; 1989; 1993; 1997; 2001; 2005; 2009; 2013; 2017; 2022; 2025

Italy competed at the 2013 World Games held in Cali, Colombia, from 25 July to 4 August.

== Medals ==
Updated after the sixth day of competition (1 August 2013).

Sport	Gold	Silver	Bronze	Total
Life saving	5	7	5	17
Roller skating artistic	3	1	2	6
Boules	3	0	1	4
Roller skating speed	2	0	0	2
Archery	1	1	2	4
Finswimming	1	1	1	3
Water skiing	1	1	0	2
Billiard sports	1	0	0	1
Ju-jitsu	0	1	1	2
Roller inline hockey	0	1	0	1
Dancesport	0	0	2	2
Karate	0	0	1	1
Totals (12 entries)	17	13	15	45

== See also ==
- 2013 World Games
- Italy at the World Games
