= Lifesaving South Africa =

South African water safety organisation

- Vigilance and Service, the LSA motto
- Abbreviation: LSA
- Predecessor: South African Surf Lifesaving Union, South African Lifesaving Association
- Formation: 2003; 23 years ago
- Type: NPO
- Headquarters: Durban
- Location: Surf House, 35 Livingstone Road, Morningside, Durban 4001
- Region served: South Africa
- President: Dhaya Sewduth
- Vice President: Warren Prins
- General Manager: Helen Herbert
- Affiliations: International Life Saving Federation
- Website: www.lifesaving.co.za

Lifesaving South Africa (LSA) is a South African organisation that promotes water safety and provides surf rescue services. LSA is a founding member organisation of the International Life Saving Federation, and a member of Royal Life Saving Society. It is recognised by DSAC and SASCOC.

Lifesaving South Africa organises national competitions such as the South African Lifesaving Surf National Championships, that involves various lifesaving events, including sea, board and beach competitions. LSA also sends representative teams to compete in international competitions.

== History ==
Lifesaving officially began in South Africa around 1911 after Sir William Henry, who was at the time, the Secretary of Royal Life Saving Society (RLSS) toured all member countries of the Commonwealth to establish branches of the RLSS. The inaugural lifeguard awards in South Africa subsequently started in 1913, with the RLSS retaining control of lifesaving activities till 1961 when South Africa established the South African Life Saving Society (SALS). In Durban, the first lifesaving club, Durban Surf Lifesaving Club was established in 1927, while the Surf Lifesaving Association of South Africa (SLASA) was established in 1933.

SALS became an affiliate of Fédération Internationale de Sauvetage Aquatique (FIS), now International Life Saving Federation (ILS), but was suspended in 1970 due to agitations against the apartheid policies of the government, only to be re-admitted in 1978. SLASA was among the pioneering seven national organisations that established International Surf Lifesaving Council in 1958. Subsequently, a new international body called World Life Saving (WLS) was established in 1971, but became abrogated in 1994 after its unification with FIS, leading to the establishment of a new international organisation, known as the International Lifesaving Federation (ILS). SALS had a name change to South African National Water Safety Council effected in 1980, then subsequently merged with SLASA to become South African Lifesaving (SAL) in 1984. South African Surf Lifesaving Union (SASLU) was founded by some 'black' affiliates of SLASA, whose participation in competitions was encumbered with many restrictions. St. Georges Strand became the initial lifesaving club to withdraw membership in 1977, prompting other clubs to follow in its footsteps. Four of the members of the aforementioned St. Georges Strand visited Cape Province and Natal Province to begin the establishment of SASLU in 1980.

LSA came into existence when two associations, the South African Surf Lifesaving Union (SASLU) together with the South African Lifesaving Association (SA Lifesaving), merged to establish one united governing body to control all lifesaving associations working in South Africa in May 2013. Lifesaving South Africa members are volunteers and they patrol majority of the South African coastline and beaches in addition to the inland resorts, and public events that are held during holidays and weekends. LSA’s main aims are the protection of bathers from drowning in water related incidents, as well as lifesaving and lifesaving sport.

== See also ==
- Commonwealth Pool Lifesaving Championships
- Lifesaving at the World Games
- World Life Saving Championships
