= Yeung Sau-king =

Hong Kong swimmer (1919–1982)

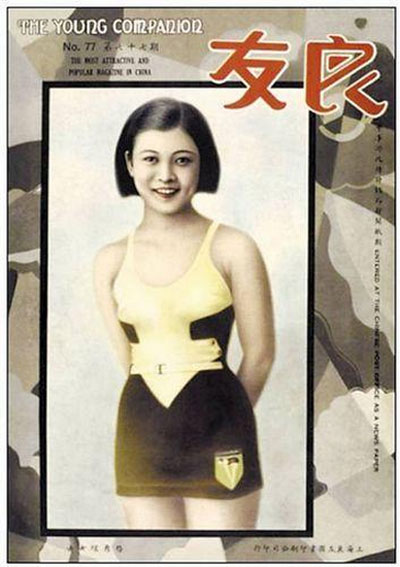
- 1933 magazine cover of The Young Companion featuring Yeung

Personal information
- Nickname: China's Mermaid
- Born: 25 April 1919 Tai Hang, British Hong Kong
- Died: 10 October 1982 (aged 63) Vancouver, Canada

Sport
- Sport: Swimming

Yeung Sau-king, also Yvonne Tan, Yang Xiuqiong and Yang Hsiu-chiung (simplified Chinese: 杨秀琼; traditional Chinese: 楊秀瓊; 25 April 1919 – 10 October 1982) was a Hong Kong Chinese swimmer. She was born in Tai Hang, Hong Kong.

== Swimming ==
Yeung's talent in swimming was inspired by her parents, members of the South China Athletic Association of Hong Kong, and learnt swimming at the age of 10 at the SCAA's Tsat Tsz Mui swimming shed.

Yeung began swimming competitively around 1930, representing the South China Athletic Association. As an 11-year-old girl, she was the winner of the annual harbour race for women on 14 October 1930 with a record-breaking time of 32 minutes and 39 seconds. In October 1933, Yeung represented Hong Kong in the 5th National Games held in Nanking. She made a splash by winning all five women's swimming events, including 50-metre freestyle, 100-metre freestyle, 100-metre backstroke, 200-metre breaststroke and 200-metre relay.

In May 1934, Yeung represented the Republic of China in the 10th Far Eastern Championship Games in the Philippines. She became a star by winning 4 gold medals in 5 women's events she participated in—50-metre freestyle, 100-metre freestyle, 100-metre backstroke and 200-metre relay—breaking the Chinese national records in all. She also won the 200-metre breaststroke but was subsequently disqualified for not touching the wall when turning. Many Filipinos called her "Miss China", and some Chinese citizens even praised her as a national heroine. In October 1935, she again represented Hong Kong in the 6th National Games held in Shanghai. She won the women's 100-metre backstroke and 100-metre freestyle, breaking the national and Far Eastern records for both events.

Yeung competed in two events—100-metre freestyle and 100-metre backstroke—at the 1936 Summer Olympics but did not advance beyond the preliminary heats. Her performance in the 100-metre backstroke was one second faster than the national record she created in 1935 .

In the 3rd Water Fest of the South China Athletic Association held on 29 July 1937, Yeung won the 50-metre freestyle event with a Chinese national record-breaking time of 33 seconds. She was preparing for the 7th National Games of China to be held in October 1937. Unfortunately, the Games were cancelled due to the outbreak of the Sino-Japanese War on 7 July. The last swimming competition she participated in before retiring was likely the 14th Annual Swimming Championships of the South China Athletic Association held on 21 September 1939. She won the women's 100-metre backstroke.

== Personal life ==
Yeung's father Yeung Chu-nam was born in Dongguan but moved to Hong Kong at a young age. Her mother was born in Hong Kong. Yeung had an elder sister and a younger brother. She married jockey Tao Bo-lin (B. L. Tao) in 1939 and had a daughter and a son.

Between 1942 and 1943, Yeung served as a special intelligence officer for the Chinese government in Japanese-occupied Hong Kong, and was interrogated by the Japanese Kenpeitai on 1 May 1943. She moved to Shanghai in October 1943.

She divorced her husband in Hong Kong in 1947 and got custody of their two children. She re-married in Shanghai in October 1948 and her second husband Tan Tjin Koan (T. K. Tan) was a Chinese Indonesian businessman. After the wedding, they moved to Thailand and had two more daughters.

The family moved to Hong Kong in 1953. From that time, she often used a new name, Yvonne Tan, in public. She became the founding chairman of the Ladies Section of the Hong Kong Life Guards' Club (later renamed The Hong Kong Life Saving Society) on 12 October 1962, serving until 1966. She was one of the Hong Kong representatives who attended the Commonwealth Life Guards Conference in London in July 1966, and was invited to attend an evening reception at the Buckingham Palace. At that time, she had been a captain of the Hong Kong Life Guards' Club for five years, and was the first woman chancellor of the Royal Life Saving Society, Hong Kong Branch.

On February 28th, 1968, she was awarded the Medal of Achievement by the Commonwealth of Nations and the certificate signed by Lord Louis Mountbatten, in recognition of her contribution to the life-saving service in Hong Kong.

Yeung moved to Vancouver, Canada in 1978 and opened a gift shop called Creation Boutique (at 5641 Dunbar Street) in 1982 shortly before her death. She died after falling from a ladder in her home, and is buried in the Ocean View Burial Park in Burnaby.
