= Glasgow Humane Society =

Search and rescue service in Glasgow, Scotland

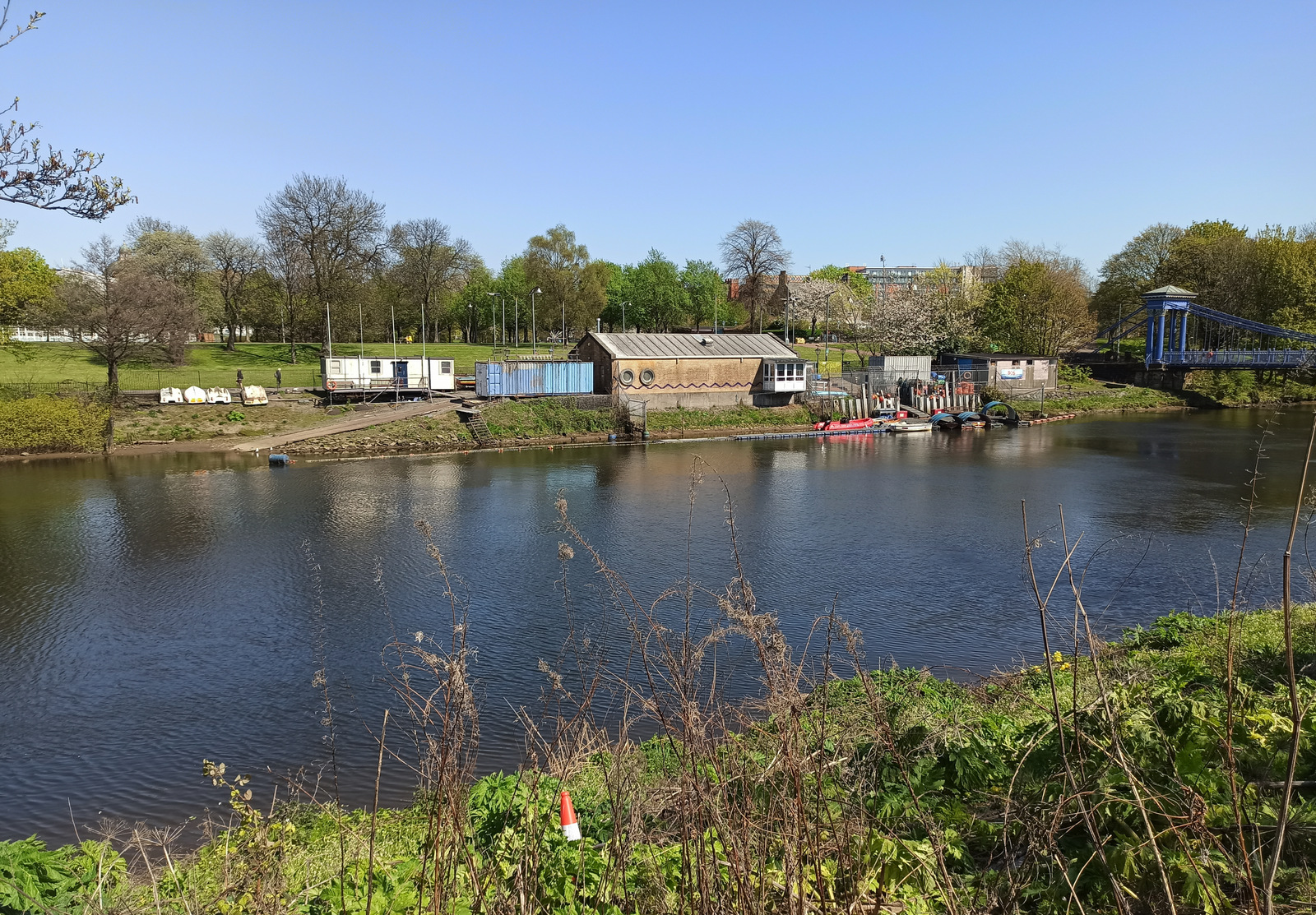
- Glasgow Humane Society at Glasgow Green

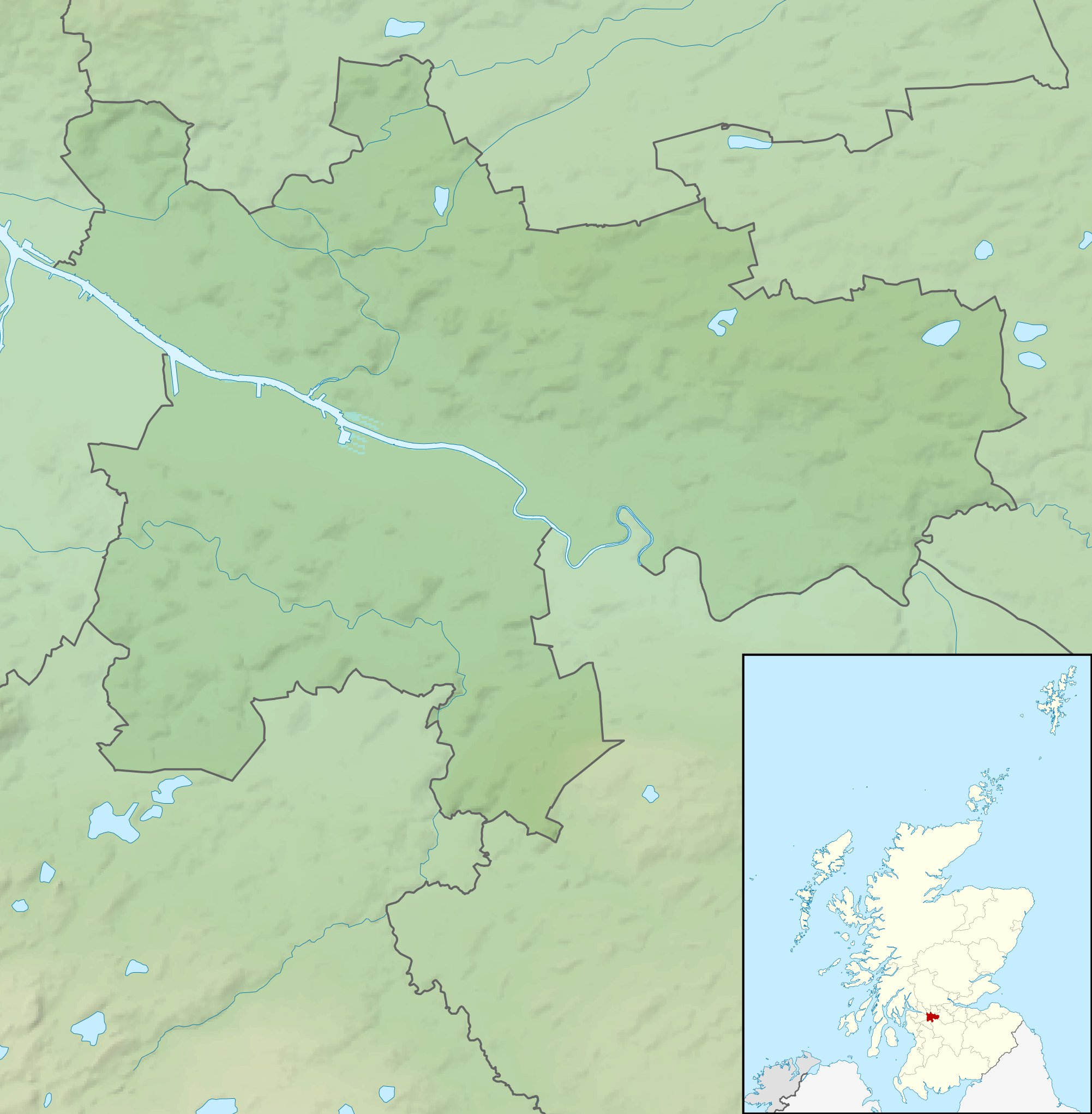
- Location within Glasgow council area

General information
- Type: Lifeboat Station
- Location: The Boatyard, Glasgow, 1D Glasgow Green, Glasgow, G40 1BA, United Kingdom
- Coordinates: 55°50′57.9″N 4°14′19.5″W
- Opened: 16 August 1790

Website
- Glasgow Humane Society

Glasgow Humane Society (GHS) operates from a boathouse alongside the River Clyde, in the grounds of Glasgow Green park, the site of the People's Palace, in the east end of the city of Glasgow, Scotland.

The independent search and rescue (SAR) service was established in 1790.

The service currently operates a Whaly 500 rescue boat, with a unique fold-down bow for ease of casualty recovery, on station since 2021.

Glasgow Humane Society is a registered charity (No. SC001178).

== History ==
Glasgow Humane Society was founded on 16 August 1790, and was one of many such Humane Societies established all over the world. In Glasgow, it was set up by members of the Royal College of Physicians and Surgeons of Glasgow, after James Coulter left the sum of £200 to the college in 1787, to set up a society.

Previously, in the eyes of the church, a person who attempted to take their own life, for example, by jumping into the river, was to end up in hell and suffer eternal damnation. A person who lives was a criminal. Regardless of whether they jumped or fell, it was unlikely that someone would come to their assistance. The Society was founded towards the end of the Age of Enlightenment, when science and intellect was taking over from religious beliefs, with a different view of people who ended up in the water.

Glasgow Humane Society established the oldest continuing lifeboat service in the world.

== World life-saving championships 1900 ==
On Saturday 21 to Monday 23 July 1900, as part of the Exposition Universelle (1900) in Paris, France, the World Life-saving Championships took place on the River Seine. The Glasgow Humane Society were invited to attend, representing Great Britain, the crew being George Geddes, James Aitken, trainer to Queen's Park F.C., and Gavin Meiklejohn, a waterman. The competition required the crew to row to someone in the water, retrieve them into the boat, and row back. A special symmetrical boat was constructed, designed by George Geddes, which has a seat down the middle of the boat, allowing easier rowing in either direction. With the unique boat, in front of a crowd of 12,000 paying spectators, the Glasgow crew won their event.

== Present day ==
The aims and objectives of the society are:

- Preservation of human life in and around the waterways of Greater Glasgow.
- Provision of lifeboat / safety services where and when requested.
- The search and recovery of persons from the River Clyde where and when requested by Police Scotland
- Advice to councils, emergency services, universities and schools businesses, riverside users and general members of the public on safety and accident prevention on waterways.
- Education of the public in water safety.

The society is contracted by the council to maintain the provision of lifebelts along the River Clyde, and to assist in 'search and locate' missions for missing people.

Alongside Strathclyde Police, the Glasgow Humane Society introduced a GPS system for rescue equipment along the River Clyde. At every lifebelt and rescue ladder position there are signs with an identifying code that a caller can to provide to police, that allows the police command and control system to accurately pinpoint the caller's location.

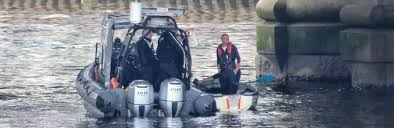
Police Scotland RIB & Glasgow Humane Society boat on the River Clyde

The Bennie, a lifeboat custom designed and constructed by GHS Officer Benjamin "Bennie" Parsonage in the 1950s, is on display in the Riverside Museum. The boat was donated to the museum in 2010, by Ben's son George, who had taken over the role of GHS Officer.

In 2012, the society travelled to London to participate in the Queen's Diamond Jubilee Pageant.

== Officers and awards ==
Of all the Humane Societies around the world, Glasgow was the only one to permanently employ someone, the Officer of the Glasgow Humane Society. The Officer, carrying out the practical duties of prevention, rescue and, inevitably, recovery, became a very effective safety consultant, and provided the only dedicated water rescue service in the world when established.

Although not an Officer, it wasn't unusual for family members to be involved in rescues. George Geddes took over from his father George in 1889, and in 1916, George Geddes Jnr., son of (1889) George Geddes, was awarded the Diploma of the Royal Humane Society Diploma, for placing his life in great danger during the rescue of a woman at Glasgow Green. Geddes Jnr. later drowned, whilst attempting a rescue on 11 November 1928.

Benjamin Parsonage succeeded George Geddes in 1928, and went onto to serve for 51 years, until his death in 1979 from a heart attack. It is recorded that during that time, he saved over 1000 lives. It is also recorded that also during that time, he also recovered over 2000 bodies from the River Clyde.

Former infantry soldier and later dog-handler, with the King's Own Scottish Borderers, and then 1st Battalion, Royal Regiment of Scotland, William Graham was appointed Officer in 2015, and is only the 11th person to hold the title since 1790.

=== Officers ===
- Robert Nathaniel Jones, Officer, 1790–1796
- John Wiseman, Officer, 1796–
- James Baird, Officer, 1801–
- James Geddes, Officer, 1841–1857? (Glasgow Green)
- Duncan Downie, Officer, 1848– (Broomlaw)
- John McLean, Officer, 1848–1857? (Govan)
- George Geddes, Officer,1859–1889

Bronze Medal of the Royal Humane Society – (Date unknown)
Gold Medal of the Glasgow Humane Society – (Date unknown)

- George Geddes, Officer, 1889–1932

Silver Medal of the Royal Humane Society – (Date unknown)
Silver Medal of the Royal Humane Society – 1901

- Benjamin Parsonage, Officer, 1928–1979

Bravery Medal from Anchor Line – 1932
Glasgow Corporation Bravery Medal – 1936
Glasgow Corporation Bravery Medal – 1953 (Second-Service bar)
Glasgow Corporation Bravery Medal – 1955 (Third-Service bar)
British Empire Medal – 1971

- George Geddes Parsonage, Officer, 1979–2015 (Consultant Officer, 2015–2019)

Glasgow Corporation Bravery Medal – 1971
Royal Humane Society Honorary Testimonial on Parchment – 1971
Strathclyde Region Medal and Bar – 1978
R.L.S.S. Mountbatten Medal – 1978
Royal Humane Society Honorary Testimonial on Parchment – 1983
St Mungo Gold Medal – 1998
Member, Order of the British Empire (MBE) – 1999
Queen Elizabeth II Golden Jubilee Medal – 2002
Royal Humane Society Honorary Testimonial – 2004
Royal Humane Society Special Silver Medal – 2005
R.L.S.S. Service Cross – 2006
Honorary Doctorate from University of Strathclyde – 2006
Honorary Degree Master of the Glasgow Caledonian University – 2006
Clydesdale Amateur Rowing Club 150th Anniversary Medal – 2007
Queen Elizabeth II Diamond Jubilee Medal – 2012
Henley Royal Regatta 150th Anniversary Medal – 2013
Chief Constable Bravery Award – 2021

- William Graham, Officer, 2015–

=== Assistant Officers ===
- Benjamin Parsonage, Asst. Officer, 1918–1928
- Mark Gash, Asst. Officer, 2003–2005
- Edward McGowan, Asst. Officer, 2005–2006
- Antony Coia, Asst. Officer (part-time), 2006–2013

R.L.S.S Commonwealth Council Certificate of Thanks – 2008
R.L.S.S Commonwealth Council Certificate of Thanks – 2012
Queen Elizabeth II Diamond Jubilee Medal – 2012

- Ben Parsonage, Asst. Officer (part-time), 2013–

=== Motor lifeboats ===
Name	On station	Class	Cost	Comments
Lede	2021–	50-hp Whaly 500	£20,000	Named in memory of William Graham's sniffer dog

== See also ==
- Independent lifeboats in Britain and Ireland
- Glasgow Life Times Past article about the Society, the Geddes family records of rescues/recoveries https://www.glasgowlife.org.uk/libraries/family-history/stories-and-blogs-from-the-mitchell/times-past-blogs/glasgow-humane-society-times-past
