= Marcello Tonelli =

Italian strategist and sportsperson (born 1975)

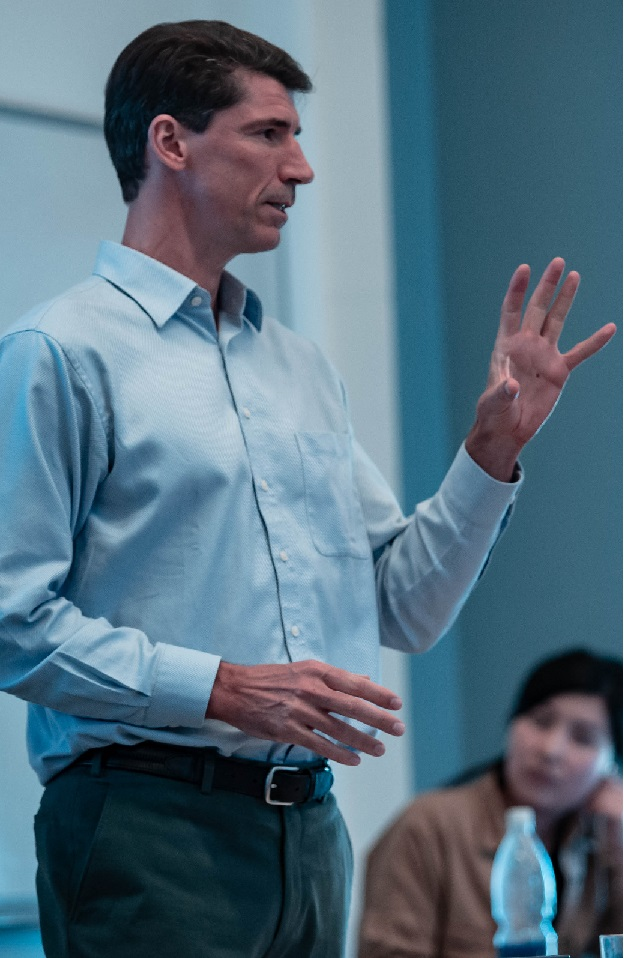
- Tonelli giving a speech on the circular economy (Biškek, 2019)
- Born: 25 April 1975 (age 51); Biella, Italy
- Citizenship: Italian and Australian
- Occupations: strategist; author

Marcello Tonelli (born 25 April 1975) is an Italian corporate and social strategist, best known for his work as an author in the field of sustainable development. As a veteran athlete, he set five world records in lifesaving and has been an accomplished international swimmer.

== Biography ==
Tonelli was born in Biella, but left Italy at a young age on an athletic scholarship to pursue a professional career in the US and then Australia, where he eventually acquired dual citizenship. He then retired to Spain.

== Education and career ==
Tonelli received a B.A from the University of Pacific, an M.I.S. from James Cook University, and in 2009 a PhD from the Queensland University of Technology in strategic management, comparing the effectiveness of different processes for collective problem-solving. In 2010 he started working at the Australian Centre for Entrepreneurship Research (ACE) under the leadership of professor Per Davidsson and got involved in the international-collaborative GEM project, which ignited his interest in how entrepreneurial opportunities are sought and perceived in contexts of absolute poverty (bottom of the pyramid).

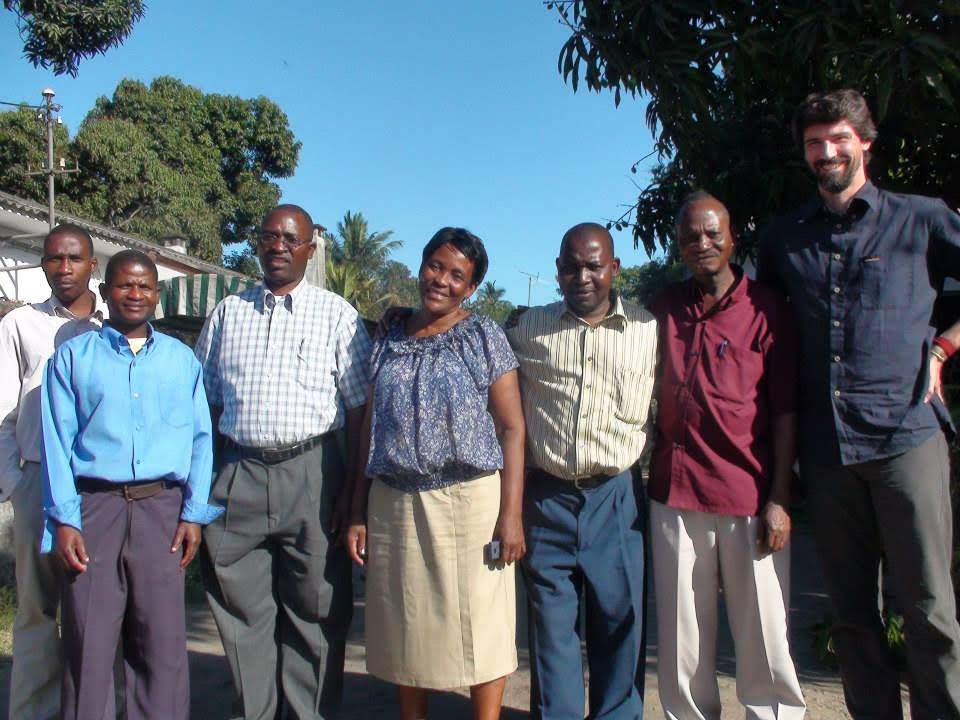
Marcello Tonelli (right) conducting staff training at Awaken Mozambique in Beira, September 2011 — part of the NGO’s mission to build sustainable economic capacity.

He worked as a strategic advisor since the late 1990s, beginning to gradually move away from the conventional business sector only in 2011. At that time he started favouring the design and testing of entrepreneurial approaches that could help alleviating poverty and guarantee the effectiveness of microcredit schemes overtime. Over the following decade his concern with sustainable development continued to intensify, eventually bridging all its three facets – economic, social, and environmental – and setting out a new methodology for enhanced sustainability management that integrated the circular economy theoretical framework with more traditional strategic management tools.

Throughout his career, Tonelli published a number of practice-oriented articles and books. Amongst his writings is Entrepreneurship at the Bottom of the Pyramid, which won the 2017 Nautilus Award and the Hollywood Book Festival in 2018. The book discusses a variety of problematic settings in the Fourth World – with a strong emphasis on locations visited by the author during a two-year period of ethnographic studies – explaining how proper training in entrepreneurship and innovation can empower individuals and therefore contribute to community advancement. In 2018 he wrote Strategic Management and the Circular Economy, an internationally recognized foundational reference that holds a central position in the literature and practice of corporate sustainability. The book explores the dynamic interactions between companies and stakeholders across multiple levels of society, highlighting pathways toward a more sustainable future. Its global relevance was further affirmed in 2023, when it was translated into Vietnamese by Colonel General Nguyen Van Thanh, Vice Chairman of the Central Theoretical Council of the Communist Party of Vietnam. In 2020 Tonelli was presented with a silver medal at the Axiom Business Book Awards.

== Lifesaving ==
Tonelli entered the sport of lifesaving at 45, representing the Canary Islands in both open and masters competitions. In the M45 age group he set two world records — ratified by the International Life Saving Federation — in the 200m obstacle swim and the 100m rescue medley. In 2025, competing in the M50 division, he achieved three more world records in the same two events plus the 50m manikin carry. Notably, his times in the 200m obstacle swim and 100m rescue medley were faster than the standing world records in the M45 and M40 categories.

== Swimming ==
He competed in Italy until the summer of 1996, helping his team Snam Milano win the first of five consecutive national titles — a record and an historic feast at the time. In the late 1990s Tonelli swam for the Pacific Tigers in the NCAA Division I under coach Ray Looze. Over four years, he medaled individually at the Big West Conference and helped win the 4×200 freestyle relay title. Years later, as a naturalized Australian, he was the oldest qualifier at the FINA Swimming World Cup in both 2005 and 2007. A medley specialist, Tonelli held various national records as a masters swimmer in Spain, Italy and Australia. Over the years he has ranked No. 1 in the world in the 100-200-400 meters medley and won multiple titles at World and European masters championships.

== See also ==
- Problem solving
- Sustainable development
- Circular economy
- Bottom of the pyramid
- Poverty reduction
- Microcredit
- List of world records in life saving
