= The Hong Kong Life Saving Society =

The Life Saving Society of Hong Kong is the life saving society in Hong Kong.

== As Royal Life Saving Society Hong Kong Branch ==
The Life Saving Society began as a branch of the Royal Life Saving Society UK in 1950 and Hong Kong Life Guard Club created 1956.

The RLSS Hong Kong Branch was charged with training while the HKLGC was in charge of life guard service.

== As Hong Kong Life Saving Society ==
The HKLSS was formed with the merger of the RLSS Hong Kong Branch and HKLGC with the current name in 1997 (required to break ties with RLSS before the handover).

HKLSS is a founding member of the International Life Saving Federation.

HKLSS issues official lifesaving awards and certificates recognized across Hong Kong for employment at pools and beaches including:

- Bronze Medallion (BM): A foundational award testing water rescue skills, swimming proficiency, and resuscitation.
- Pool Lifeguard Award (PLGA): Qualifies holders to work as professional pool lifeguards under government regulations.
- Beach Lifeguard Award (BLGA): Advanced certification required for supervising open water and beach environments.
- Aquatic First Aid Certificate: Trains candidates in specialized first aid responses for water-related emergencies

== See also ==
- Royal Life Saving Society UK
- Royal Life Saving Society Australia
- Royal Life Saving Society of Canada
