= World Life Saving Championships =

Biannual life saving sport event

The ILS World Life Saving Championships are the world championships for lifesaving sport events. They are sanctioned by the International Life Saving Federation (ILS), conducted every 2 years, and formerly marketed and known as the ‘Rescue’ series, for example – Rescue 2008.

The World Life Saving Championships incorporate - National Teams World Championships, Interclub Teams World Championships, Masters World Championships, Surfboats World Championships and IRB World Championships. Additional championships can include additional events such as March Past, Long distance Race and 2k Beach Run. The World Championships typically attract between 3,000 and 5,000 competitors and officials, and are conducted over a period of 12 to 14 days.

== History ==
Prior to the amalgamation of WLS and FIS in 1993 to create ILS, both WLS and FIS conducted World Championship events in Life Saving Sports. Founded in 1971 WLS conducted ocean and beach based world championships for National Teams in South Africa in 1974 and Interclub World Championships in 1981 and 1983. The 1988, 1990, and 1992 Rescue series of World Championship events were also organised by WLS. Rescue 88, the 1988 World Championships were the first international championships to conduct both ocean and pool events. In 1956 prior to the advent of WLS, as part of the 1956 Olympic Games celebrations Surf Life Saving Australia (a founding member of WLS) hosted an International Lifesaving Championships at Torquay Beach in which teams from several countries competed against each other. It could be argued that this was the first World Lifesaving Championships for ocean and beach events. Founded in 1910, member nations of FIS agreed to conduct World Championships in pool life saving events. The first such championships were conducted in Paris, France in 1955 and were held sporadically over the next 40 years until the final FIS Championships in 1995. These contests were strictly for national representative teams only. Since 1996, World Life Saving Championships have been conducted solely by ILS every two years.

In 2014 the word “Rescue” was replaced with the term “Lifesaving World Championships” (LWC) to better describe the ILS LWC and to delineate from the biennial ILS World Conference on Drowning Prevention.

== List of competitions ==
Number	Year	Championship	Location	Country
1	1955	FIS	Paris, France	France
2	1956	FIS	Mulhouse, France	France
3	1956	International contest	Torquay Beach, Australia	Australia
4	1957	FIS	Bordeaux, France	France
5	1958	FIS	Châlons du Marne et Reims, France	France
6	1959	FIS	Wiesbaden, Germany	Germany
7	1960	FIS	Madrid, Spain	Spain
8	1961	FIS	Esch sur Alzette, Luxembourg	Luxembourg
9	1962	FIS	Rome, Italy	Italy
10	1963	FIS	Paris, France	France
11	1964	FIS	Alger, Algeria	Algeria
12	1966	FIS	Rabat, Morocco	Morocco
13	1967	FIS	Salzburg, Austria	Austria
14	1968	FIS	Trier, Germany	Germany
15	1969	FIS	Rome, Italy	Italy
16	1972	FIS	Vittel Neufchateau Contrexville, France	France
17	1974	WLS	South Africa	South Africa
18	1974	FIS	Barcelona, Spain	Spain
19	1976	FIS	Berlin, Germany	Germany
20	1978	FIS	London, Great Britain	United Kingdom
21	1981	WLS Interclub	Bali, Indonesia	Indonesia
22	1981	FIS	Sofia, Bulgaria	Bulgaria
23	1983	WLS Interclub	Hawaii, United States	United States
24	1983	FIS	Warsaw, Poland	Poland
25	1987	FIS	Warendorf, Germany	Germany
26	1988	Rescue 88	Gold Coast, Australia	Australia
27	1990	Rescue 90	Lübeck/Travemünde, Germany	Germany
28	1991	FIS	Jönköping, Sweden	Sweden
29	1992	Rescue 92	Shimoda, Japan	Japan
30	1994	Rescue 94	Cardiff/Newquay, Great Britain	United Kingdom
31	1995	FIS	Valenciennes, France	France
32	1996	Rescue 96	Durban, South Africa	South Africa
33	1998	Rescue 98	Auckland, New Zealand	New Zealand
34	2000	Rescue 2000	Sydney, Australia	Australia
35	2002	Rescue 2002	Daytona Beach/Orlando, United States	United States
36	2004	Rescue 2004	Livorno/Viareggio, Italy	Italy
37	2006	Rescue 2006	Geelong/Lorne, Australia	Australia
38	2008	Rescue 2008	Berlin/Warnemünde, Germany	Germany
39	2010	Rescue 2010	Alexandria, Egypt	Egypt
40	2012	Rescue 2012	Adelaide, Australia	Australia
41	2014	Rescue 2014	Montpellier and La Grande-Motte, France	France
42	2016	LWC 2016	Eindhoven and Noordwijk, The Netherlands	Netherlands
43	2018	LWC 2018	Adelaide, Australia	Australia
44	2022	LWC 2020	Riccione, Italy	Italy
45	2024	LWC 2024	Gold Coast, Australia	Australia
46	2026	LWC 2026	Port Elisabeth – Nelson Mandela Bay, South Africa	South Africa
47	2028	LWC 2028	TBC	
48	2030	LWC 2030	Perth, Australia	Australia
