= Rashtriya Life Saving Society (India) =

The Rashtriya Life Saving Society (India) [RLSSI] is a national, non-profit, voluntary organisation dedicated to helping people to learn modern lifesaving techniques. The Society is the leading provider of training in first aid, resuscitation, water safety, life saving and life guarding skills in India. The Society is a member of the International Life Saving Federation and branch of the Royal Life Saving Society Commonwealth.

The Rashtriya Life Saving Society (India) headquartered in Pune, came into being on 2 August 1998 through an understanding signed between representatives of the Royal Life Saving Society (Commonwealth), the Royal Life Saving Society (Australia), the Indian Maritime Foundation and RLSS (I).

The Society has established branches in some districts of the country and through its volunteers motivates people, specially the young to learn skills to help a fellow being in distress. The Rashtriya Life Saving Society (India) conducts certifications in Resuscitation (CPR), First Aid, Lifesaving, Lifeguard. The lifesaving certification is based on the Bronze Medallion standard of the Royal Life Saving Society Commonwealth.

The Rashtriya Life Saving Society (India) is the governing body for lifesaving sport in India – a sport recognized by the International Olympic Committee and the Commonwealth Games Federation.

Founder

After his early education at the Prince of Wales Military College, Dehra Dun and training at the National Defence Academy, Kharakwasla, Pune, Rear Admiral (Retd) PD Sharma, AVSM, NM was commissioned in 1960 and joined the Fleet Air Arm of the Indian Navy the same year. A graduate of the Defence Services Staff College, he held several commands of air squadrons, ships and establishments, before taking over as the Command Operations & Plans Officer, Western Naval Command in 1986. As a young Naval aviator he took part in Indo - Pak conflicts of 1965 & 71 and later served as the Naval Attache' in the Indian Embassy in Islamabad, Pakistan from 1978 to 81. After staff tenures at the Naval Headquarters and the Directorate General NCC, in Flag Rank, he took premature retirement in 1993 to do something different. For four years after leaving service he was into Adventure Tourism spending much of his time promoting adventure tourism in the country, particularly in deserts of Rajasthan and hills of Himachal & Uttar Pradesh.

Rear Admiral P D Sharma was elected as President of International Life Saving Federation's Asia Pacific Region in 2012. He is the first ever person to hold such a position from Asia.
