= Ithaca–Caloundra City Life Saving Club =

Lifeguard association in Caloundra, Queensland

Ithaca–Caloundra City
- Full name: Ithaca–Caloundra City Life Saving Club
- Founded: 1954; 72 years ago
- Members: 120 senior, 40 junior

The Ithaca–Caloundra City Life Saving Club is a Royal Life Saving Club (one of only a few in Queensland) based in Caloundra, Queensland, Australia.

== History ==
The club started operations in March 1954 with a group of six men whose aim was to form a Royal Life Saving Club that catered for men. This was unusual at the time, as surf clubs catered for men, while Royal Life Saving Clubs had female members. The club was started at Ithaca Pool after the aforementioned men (which included G. Marr, J. Cooley, B.Daley & D. Payne) returned from the Royal Life Saving Society Australia National Championships in Tasmania. The lessee of Ithaca Pool was Mr Joe Venning, son of the Frank Venning who was heavily involved in Life Saving at the time. Metropolitan Life Saving Club (which at the time was affiliated with Royal Life Saving Society, and is now known as Metropolitan–Caloundra Surf Life Saving Club – Mets) also trained at the Ithaca Baths and members used to travel to/from Caloundra together to patrol. The official badges of both clubs are similar being based on the Royal Life Saving logo.

By the late 1950s and early 1960s the club had grown to a reasonable size, during this time patrols commenced at Bulcock Beach, Caloundra. It is believed that this location (Bulcock Beach) was chosen after the death of two swimmers, who had decided to swim to Bribie Island from Bulcock Beach and were never seen again, presumably drowning.

Originally the beach was patrolled by women only. Later on, men and women patrolled on alternate weekends and mixed patrols began in the 1970s.

The original Lifesaving Clubhouse was a tent at the nearby Carvan Park (adjoining the current Coast Guard) which was replaced by a semi-permanent timber building. After a storm in the 1970s this building almost fell over and the Club took over an old boat & bait hire shop at Bulcock Beach. This was located on the site of the present Clubhouse building, next to the White Fleet shop which was a general store that hired out boats. Older members have many fond memories of the crowded accommodation and the fun times that they had!

In 2004, the club celebrated its 50th anniversary with a reunion of over 150 past and present members. It was an opportunity to swap memories and reminisce about the past as well as make plans for the future.

== History of the word "Ithaca" ==
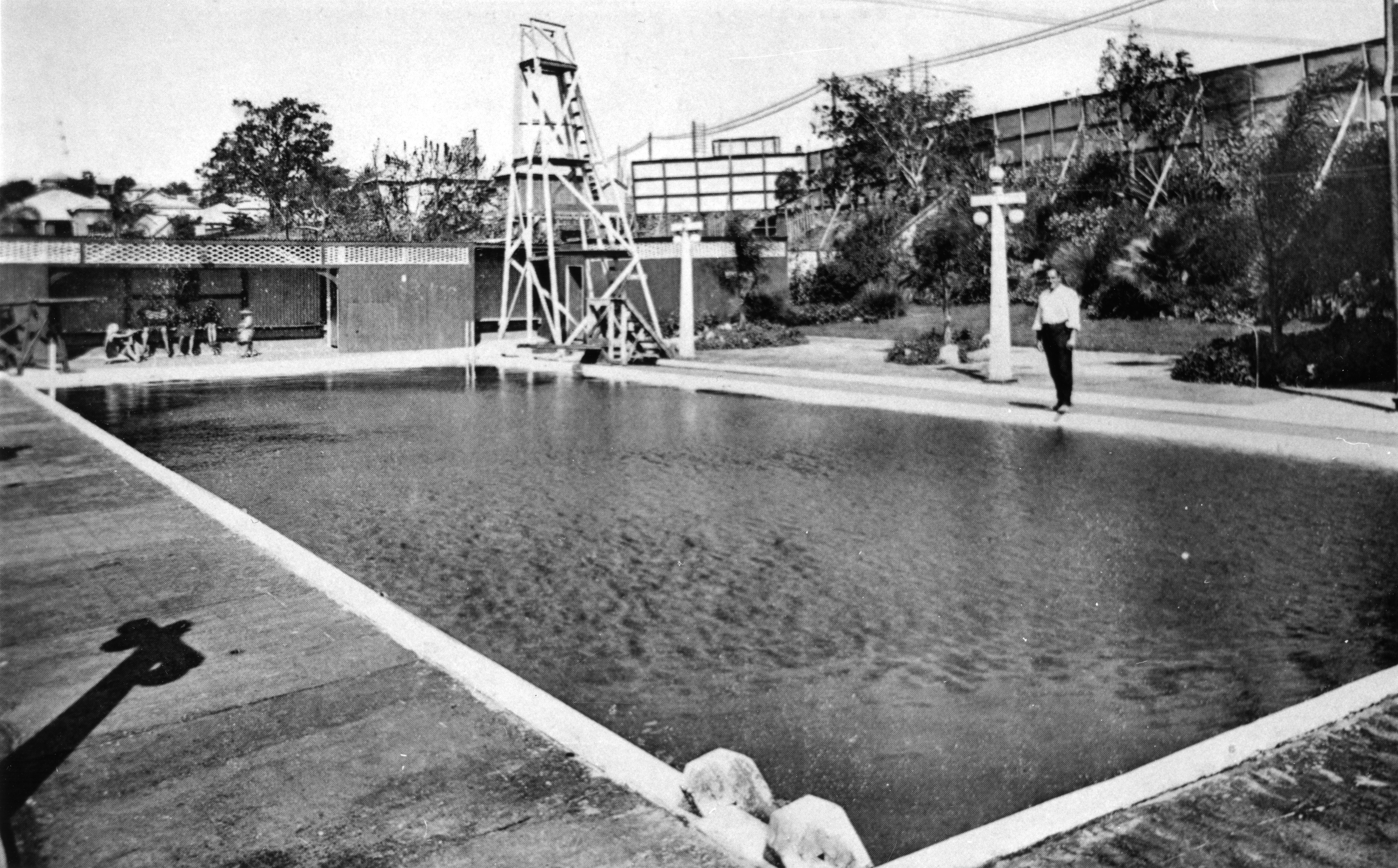
Ithaca swimming pool, 1918

Queensland's inaugural Governor, Sir George Bowen was previously the Governor of the Ionian Islands off Greece. Ithaca is a town on the Ionian Island, and is also a suburb of Brisbane, presumerably named by Governor Bowen. Whilst the suburb of Ithaca still exists, it is no longer an official suburb of Brisbane, but it is part of Paddington.

The home of Life Saving in Queensland was the Ithaca Baths (Swimming Pool) which still exists today. The club, as did many other Qld Clubs, started at Ithaca Baths and the club was originally known as Ithaca Life Saving Club, in 1982 changing its name to Ithaca - Bulcock Beach Life Saving Club, and finally to the present name (Ithaca - Caloundra City Life Saving Club). The club has considered on many occasions of dropping the word Ithaca from its name, however support for the history of the club has been such that it has always remained. Newer members refer to the club as Caloundra City Life Saving Club, however older members still refer to the club as Ithaca Life Saving Club.

== Services and operations ==
The Club provides volunteer beach patrol and rescue services (lifeguard / lifesaver) at Bulcock Beach Caloundra during all weekends and public holidays in the summer months. The club also provides a Junior Activities program and Grey Medallion course for the mature age public.

== Rescue equipment ==
The club operates three inflatable rescue boats and a larger aluminium powered rescue boat, to help it patrol Bulcock Beach, Golden Beach, Happy Valley and surrounding areas.

== Competition ==
The club is active at State, National and International Competition Events. At the recent 2010 world life saving championship, members won a gold medal in the pool line throw event (men's 45+ age group) and bronze medal in Paddle Board Rescue Race (Men's 40+ age group).

== See also ==
- Royal Life Saving Society Australia
- Royal Life Saving Society UK
- Royal Life Saving Society of Canada
- Surf Life Saving Australia
