= Lifesaving Awards =

The Royal Life Saving Society UK awards several lifesaving awards indicating competence and ability.

== Bronze Medallion ==
The Bronze Medallion was the flagship award of the Royal Life Saving Society UK until 2012. It was open to those age 14 years of age and over, and consists of test of resuscitation, theory questions on water safety, self rescue, and rescue principles, and a practical swimming pool based assessment.

== Award of Merit ==
The Award of Merit is available to any lifesaver who has obtained their Bronze Medallion and Life Support 2. In addition, candidates must be over 15 in order to take part. The exam demands a high level of technical and physical capability from the participant and consists of six main parts:

1. The Water Based Rescue - where the individual must implement swimming and towing techniques to rescue one casualty 15-20m from safety.
2. Non-Contact Rescue - the well-known "timed swim" where the individual must swim 75m to the casualty and use their clothing to tow the casualty 75m to safety, all within five minutes.
3. Contact Rescue - where the individual must swim 25m to a conscious casualty and implement a contact tow to bring them 75m to safety.
4. Resuscitation Rescue - where an unconscious casualty must be towed 30m to safety and resuscitated.
5. Initiative Test - where there are two casualties up to 25m from safety in various situations that must be dealt with within at least two minutes, with the candidate being asked to subsequently answer questions regarding their actions.

The tested individual must also be able to answer questions on Water Safety and Rescue Techniques including Priorities of Rescue and Survival in Water. The award is then valid for two years, after which it must be renewed along with any previous awards that may have expired.

== Open Water ==
The open water life saving awards are issued in the form of the Bronze Cross indicating competence and the Silver Cross indicating proficiency. These awards are issued following a test combining theory questions and practical swimming demonstrations.

For the Bronze Cross a candidate must hold or have held a bronze medallion or higher. The theory portion consists of eight to twelve questions from the lifesaving manual. Practical demonstrations require a rescue close to land, rescue further from land, resuscitation rescue.

The silver cross requires all those for the bronze cross plus a contact rescue.

== Distinction ==
The Distinction Award is available to any lifesaver who has obtained their Award of Merit, Open Water, and Life Support 3. In addition, candidates must be over 16 in order to take part. The exam is notoriously hard and demands a high level of technical and physical capability from the participant. It consists of six main parts:

1. Land Based Rescue - where the individual must rescue two casualties from the side who are 2-10m from safety.
2. Water Based Rescue - where the individual must implement swimming and towing techniques to rescue two casualties 15-20m from safety.
3. Non-Contact Rescue - the well-known "timed swim" where the individual must swim 100m to the casualty and use their clothing to tow the casualty 100m to safety, all within six minutes.
4. Contact Rescue - where the individual must swim 50m to a conscious casualty and implement a contact tow to bring them 100m to safety.
5. Resuscitation Rescue - where an unconscious casualty must be towed 45m to safety and resuscitated.
6. Initiative Test - where there are three casualties up to 25m from safety in various situations that must be dealt with within at least two minutes, with the candidate being asked to subsequently answer questions regarding their actions.

The tested individual must also be able to answer questions on Water Safety and Rescue Techniques including Priorities of Rescue and Survival in Water. The award is then valid for two years, after which it must be renewed along with any previous awards that may have expired.
