= List of world records in life saving =

The world records in life saving are ratified by ILS, the International Life Saving Federation. Records can be set by registered competitors in the open category, as well as in youth and masters age groups. Youth ranges from 15 to 18 years of age. Masters start at age 30, and competitors are bracketed into five-year age groups to promote fair competition. The 100m Obstacle Swim is an event only available to senior masters (50 years and above).

== Men ==
=== 200m Obstacle Swim ===
Age group	Record	Athlete	Nation	Club	Date	Venue	Ref	Video
Open	01'53.16	Bradley Woodward	Australia	National Team	22.11.2019	Warendorf		
Youth	01'56.74	Zac Reid	New Zealand	National Team	24.11.2018	Adelaide		
Masters M30	01'56.18	Kent Steven	New Zealand	Black Fins Squad	23.06.2018	Eindhoven		
Masters M35	02'04.12	Naoya Hirano	Japan	Yamagata Lifesaving	30.10.2021	Shizuoka		
Masters M40	02'12.55	David Locke	Australia	Coogee	10.11.2012	Adelaide		
Masters M45	02'12.29	Marcello Tonelli	Spain	Club Natacion Martianez	26.02.2021	Alicante		
Masters M50	02'12.22	Marcello Tonelli	Spain	Club Natacion Metropole	05.04.2025	Valladolid		
Masters M55	02'25.08	Stephen Fry	Australia	BMD Northcliffe SLSC	07.08.2015	Gold Coast		

=== 50m Manikin Carry ===
Age group	Record	Athlete	Nation	Club	Date	Venue	Ref	Video
Open	00'27.27	Wieck Danny	Germany	National Team	22.07.2017	Wroclaw		
Youth	00'29.35	Simone Locchi	Italy	In Sport Rane Rosee	24.04.2022	Milan		
Masters M30	00'28.80	Wieck Danny	Germany	DLRG Anklam	26.03.2022	Warendorf		
Masters M35	00'30.70	Sebastián Rodriguez	Argentina	YMCA Salvamento Argentina	22.09.2022	Riccione		
Masters M40	00'33.73	Marc Kiemann	Germany	DLRG Bermatingen-Markdorf	17.09.2019	Riccione		
Masters M45	00'34.62	Toshiyuki Tamura	Japan	Choshi Lifesaving	30.10.2021	Shizuoka		
Masters M50	00'34.30	Marcello Tonelli	Spain	Club Natacion Metropole	06.04.2025	Valladolid		
Masters M55	00'37.63	Michael Meik	Germany	DLRG Gelsenkirchen	27.09.2015	Alicante		
Masters M60	00'38.06	Michael Meik	Germany	DLRG Gelsenkirchen	17.09.2019	Riccione		
Masters M65	00'45.08	Grant Simpson	Australia	Grange SLSC	04.07.2021	Adelaide		
Masters M70	00'49.67	Jozef Rozalski	Poland	Zyrardow WOPR	03.09.2016	Eindhoven		

=== 100m Manikin Carry with Fins ===
Age group	Record	Athlete	Nation	Club	Date	Venue	Ref	Video
Open	00'44.04	Jan Malkowski	Germany	DLRG Schloss Holte-Stukenbrock	26.05.2019	Magdeburg		
Youth	00'45.96	Marco Hetfeld	Germany	DLRG Schwerte	26.05.2019	Magdeburg		
Masters M30	00'46.11	Kent Steven	New Zealand	National Team	01.12.2019	Eindhoven		
Masters M35	00'48.13	Mateusz Szurmiej	Poland	National Team	15.09.2021	Castellon de la Plana		
Masters M40	00'52.54	Jean-Baptiste Gimie	France	ES Marseille	26.05.2017	Alicante		
Masters M45	00'52.67	Thorsten Sonsmann	Germany	DLRG Region Uetersen	18.09.2019	Riccione		
Masters M50	00'55.23	Norbert Haaser	Germany	DLRG Bermatingen-Markdorf	27.09.2015	Alicante		
Masters M55	00'55.62	Heiko Venohr	Germany	DLRG Gelsenkirchen	23.06.2018	Eindhoven		
Masters M60	01'00.00	Michael Meik	Germany	DLRG Gelsenkirchen	18.09.2019	Riccione		
Masters M65	01'09.56	Grant Simpson	Australia	Grange SLSC	04.07.2021	Adelaide		
Masters M70	01'21.85	Joel Gitelson	USA	Los Angeles County Lifeguards	18.11.2018	Adelaide		

=== 100m Manikin Tow with Fins ===
Age group	Record	Athlete	Nation	Club	Date	Venue	Ref	Video
Open	00'49.02	Jacopo Musso	Italy	Rari Nantes Torino	22.07.2017	Wroclaw		
Youth	00'49.77	Tom Durager	France	Tournefeuille Sauvetage Nautique	21.08.2023	Gorzów Wielkopolski		
Masters M30	00'50.02	Kevin Lehr	Germany	Luckenwalde	05.09.2021	Berlin		
Masters M35	00'55.01	Ronnie Dalsgaard	Denmark	National Team	17.11.2018	Adelaide		
Masters M40	00'57.04	Adam Moore	Australia	West Lifesaving Club	10.01.2020	Perth		
Masters M45	00'57.33	Adam Moore	Australia	West Lifesaving Club	23.10.2021	Perth		
Masters M50	01'00.91	Norbert Haaser	Germany	Bermatingen-Markdorf	17.09.2016	Eindhoven		
Masters M55	01'03.31	Heiko Venohr	Germany	Gelsenkirchen	23.06.2018	Eindhoven		
Masters M60	01'08.31	Michael Meik	Germany	Gelsenkirchen	17.09.2019	Riccione		
Masters M65	01'10.89	Robert Read	Canada	Narval Sauvetage Sportif	01.06.2019	Markham, Ontario		
Masters M70	01'19.67	Doug Bishop	Australia	St. Laurent Complex	03.09.2016	Eindhoven		

=== 200m Super Lifesaver ===
Age group	Record	Athlete	Nation	Club	Date	Venue	Ref	Video
Open	02'04.33	Federico Gilardi	Italy	National Team	23.04.2017	Milan		
Youth	02'10.02	Davide Cremonini	Italy	GS Vigili del Fuoco G. Salza Torino	25.04.2022	Milan		
Masters M30	02'07.68	Federico Pinotti	Italy	National Team	21.11.2015	Warendorf		
Masters M35	02'21.06	Daniele Battegazzore	Italy	Swimming Club Alessandria	11.06.2017	Riccione		
Masters M40	02'28.70	Christophe Attrait	France	Biarritz Sauvetage Cotier	30.05.2019	Tarbes		
Masters M45	02'31.61	Christophe Attrait	France	Biarritz Sauvetage Cotier	13.05.2021	Tarbes		
Masters M50	02'32.02	Christophe Attrait	France	Biarritz Sauvetage Cotier	18.01.2025	Aubervilliers		

=== 100m Rescue Medley ===
Age group	Record	Athlete	Nation	Club	Date	Venue	Ref	Video
Open	00'57.66	Francesco Ippolito	Italy	Gorizia Nuoto	27.01.2021	Lignano Sabbiadoro		
Youth	01'00.72	Simone Locchi	Italy	In Sport Rane Rosse	22.05.2021	Riccione		
Masters M30	01'00.63	Federico Pinotti	Italy	National Team	22.11.2014	Warendorf		
Masters M35	01'05.91	Naoya Hirano	Japan	Yamagata Lifesaving	30.10.2021	Shizuoka		
Masters M40	01'12.40	Christophe Attrait	France	Biarritz Sauvetage Cotier	06.04.2018	Tarbes		
Masters M45	01'11.06	Marcello Tonelli	Spain	Club Natacion Martianez	07.05.2023	Castellon		
Masters M50	01'09.23	Marcello Tonelli	Spain	Club Natacion Metropole	06.04.2025	Valladolid		
Masters M55	01'43.92	Robert Ubeda	France	Club Sauvetage Secourisme du Muretain	06.04.2018	Tarbes		
Masters M60	01'40.89	Grant Simpson	Australia	West Beach Surf Life Saving Club	07.07.2019	Adelaide		
Masters M65	01'38.30	Grant Simpson	Australia	Grange SLSC	03.07.2021	Adelaide		

=== 100m Obstacle Swim ===
Age group	Record	Athlete	Nation	Club	Date	Venue	Ref	Video
Masters M50	01'07.05	Randall Eickhoff	USA	California SLA	01.06.2019	Markham, Ontario		
Masters M55	01'05.15	Michael Meik	Germany	Gelsenkirchen	14.09.2014	Montpellier		
Masters M60	01'06.45	Paul Blackbeard	Australia	BMD Northcliffe SLSC	10.01.2021	Perth		
Masters M65	01'13.11	Grant Simpson	Australia	Grange SLSC	04.07.2021	Adelaide		
Masters M70	01'23.04	Joel Gitelson	USA	Los Angeles County Lifeguards	16.11.2018	Adelaide		

== Women ==
=== 200m Obstacle Swim ===
Age group	Record	Athlete	Nation	Club	Date	Venue	Ref	Video
Open	02'01.88	Lu Ying	China	National Team	23.07.2009	Kaohsiung		
Youth	02'04.32	Giulia Vetrano	Italy	Centro Nuoto Nichelino	21.05.2021	Riccione		
Masters M30	02'10.14	Zsuzsanna Jakabos	Hungary	National Team	13.09.2021	Castellon de la Plana		
Masters M35	02'19.80	Kristyl Smith	Australia	BMD Northcliffe SLSC	16.11.2018	Adelaide		
Masters M40	02'25.18	Dori Miller	Australia	Bondi Surf Life Saving Club	16.08.2013	Brisbane		
Masters M45	02'25.41	Dori Miller	Australia	Bondi Surf Life Saving Club	16.11.2018	Adelaide		
Masters M50	02'27.19	Norma Cahill	Ireland	National Team	14.02.2016	Limerick		

=== 50m Manikin Carry ===
Age group	Record	Athlete	Nation	Club	Date	Venue	Ref	Video
Open	00'32.20	Nina Holt	Germany	National Team	30.08.2024	Gold Coast		video
Youth	00'34.04	Nina Holt	Germany	National Team	20.02.2021	Warendorf		
Masters M30	00'33.98	Kerstin Lange	Germany	DLRG Harsewinkel	26.03.2022	Warendorf		
Masters M35	00'35.44	Aurelie Romanini	Belgium	Blocry BOUST	24.04.2022	Seraing		
Masters M40	00'39.75	Jeanette Libera-Körner	Germany	DLRG Berlin-Charlottenburg/Wilmersdorf	18.11.2016	Warendorf		
Masters M45	00'40.38	Jeanette Libera-Körner	Germany	DLRG Berlin-Charlottenburg/Wilmersdorf	17.09.2019	Riccione		
Masters M50	00'42.84	Jennifer Whiteley	Australia	The Hills Swimming and Lifesaving Club	15.11.2012	Adelaide		
Masters M55	00'42.40	Jennifer Whiteley	Australia	The Hills Swimming and Lifesaving Club	16.01.2016	Gold Coast		
Masters M60	00'42.49	Jennifer Whiteley	Australia	The Hills Swimming and Lifesaving Club	17.11.2018	Adelaide		
Masters M65	00'59.14	Evelyn Schoppenhauer	Germany	DLRG Hagen	15.09.2014	Montpellier		
Masters M70	00'59.72	Ute Hole	Germany	DLRG Remagen	15.09.2014	Montpellier		

=== 100m Manikin Carry with Fins ===
Age group	Record	Athlete	Nation	Club	Date	Venue	Ref	Video
Open	00'49.30	Lucrezia Fabretti	Italy	In Sport Rane Rosse	23.04.2022	Milan		
Youth	00'49.33	Lucrezia Fabretti	Italy	National Team	22.09.2019	Riccione		
Masters M30	00'54.06	Anneloes Peulen	Holland	National Team	04.08.2015	Swansea		
Masters M35	00'59.99	Lisa Ferguson	Australia	Tweed Heads Coolangatta SLSC	12.01.2019	Sydney		
Masters M40	01'02.01	Stefanie Adam	Germany	LV Württemberg	18.09.2019	Riccione		
Masters M45	01'06.51	Simona Pognant	Italy	Vigili del Fuoco Grosseto	26.05.2017	Alicante		
Masters M50	01'08.00	Norma Cahill	Ireland	National Team	14.02.2015	Limerick		
Masters M55	01'14.05	Jennifer Whiteley	Australia	The Hills Swimming and Lifesaving Club	17.01.2015	Hobart		
Masters M60	01'12.41	Jennifer Whiteley	Australia	The Hills Swimming and Lifesaving Club	18.11.2018	Adelaide		
Masters M65	01'29.70	Pam Stanley	Australia	The Hills Swimming and Lifesaving Club	18.11.2018	Adelaide		
Masters M70	01'44.84	Ute Hole	Germany	National Team	14.09.2014	Montpellier		

=== 100m Manikin Tow with Fins ===
Age group	Record	Athlete	Nation	Club	Date	Venue	Ref	Video
Open	00'55.40	Federica Volpini	Italy	GS Fiamme Oro Roma	25.05.2019	Riccione		
Youth	00'58.64	Lola Caballero Fuset	Spain	National Team	13.09.2021	Castellon de la Plana		
Masters M30	00'58.78	Magalie Rousseau	France	Entente Nautique Albigeoise	06.04.2018	Tarbes		
Masters M35	01'02.32	Nele Vanbuel	Belgium	Nelaur Barveaux	13.11.2021	Antwerp		
Masters M40	01'06.33	Claudine Roemen	Holland	RB Echt	12.11.2016	Eindhoven		
Masters M45	01'08.20	Lisa Brown	Canada	Ottawa Beaches LSC	17.11.2018	Adelaide		video
Masters M50	01'11.01	Norma Cahill	Ireland	National Team	14.02.2015	Limerick		
Masters M55	01'10.97	Jennifer Whiteley	Australia	The Hills Swimming and Lifesaving Club	16.01.2014	Canberra		
Masters M60	01'11.54	Jennifer Whiteley	Australia	The Hills Swimming and Lifesaving Club	18.11.2018	Adelaide		
Masters M65	01'28.49	Pam Stanley	Australia	The Hills Swimming and Lifesaving Club	16.11.2018	Adelaide		
Masters M70	01'52.65	Margarete Beideck	Germany	Durlach	25.05.2017	Alicante		

=== 200m Super Lifesaver ===
Age group	Record	Athlete	Nation	Club	Date	Venue	Ref	Video
Open	02'18.81	Paola Lanzilotti	Italy	Rari Nantes Torino	25.07.2021	Rome		
Youth	02'22.32	Lani Pallister	Australia	Alexandra Headlands SLSC	23.11.2019	Warendorf		video
Masters M30	02'26.64	Magali Rousseau	France	Entente Nautique Albigeoise	06.04.2018	Tarbes		
Masters M35	02'36.65	Nele Vanbuel	Belgium	Nelaur Barveaux	14.11.2021	Antwerp		
Masters M40	02'53.97	Claudine Roemen	Holland	RB Echt	13.11.2016	Eindhoven		
Masters M45	02'48.11	Bruna Ravera	Italy	Aquatica Torino	02.07.2016	Rome		
Masters M50	02'52.59	Bruna Ravera	Italy	Aquatica Torino	04.02.2017	Riccione		
Masters M55	03'05.41	Jennifer Whiteley	Australia	The Hills Swimming and Lifesaving Club	13.01.2018	Adelaide		

=== 100m Rescue Medley ===
Age group	Record	Athlete	Nation	Club	Date	Venue	Ref	Video
Open	01'05.75	Nina Holt	Germany	National Team	29.08.2024	Gold Coast		video
Youth	01'10.21	Lani Pallister	Australia	Alexandra Headland SLSC	28.11.2018	Adelaide		
Masters M30	01'10.05	Magalie Rousseau	France	National Team	21.09.2019	Riccione		
Masters M35	01'23.32	Nele Vanbuel	Belgium	Nelaur Barveaux	09.05.2021	Bruges		
Masters M40	01'23.46	Kuni Aoki	Japan	Yugawara Lifesaving Club	20.05.2018	Yokohama		
Masters M45	01'30.37	Bruna Ravera	Italy	Aquatica Torino	03.07.2016	Rome		
Masters M50	01'28.88	Norma Cahill	Ireland	Co Clare	10.02.2018	Limerick		
Masters M55	01'31.53	Jennifer Whiteley	Australia	The Hills Swimming and Lifesaving Club	12.01.2018	Adelaide		

=== 100m Obstacle Swim ===
Age group	Record	Athlete	Nation	Club	Date	Venue	Ref	Video
Masters M50	01'09.54	Jennifer Whiteley	Australia	The Hills Swimming and Lifesaving Club	18.01.2013	Sydney		
Masters M55	01'10.70	Jennifer Whiteley	Australia	The Hills Swimming and Lifesaving Club	16.01.2014	Canberra		
Masters M60	01'09.27	Jennifer Whiteley	Australia	The Hills Swimming and Lifesaving Club	16.11.2018	Adelaide		
Masters M65	01'25.32	Lenka Noitz	Germany	Ingolstadt	17.09.2019	Riccione		
Masters M70	01'36.49	Ute Hole	Germany	National Team	14.09.2014	Montpellier		

== See also ==
- Lifesaving (sport)
- Lifesaving at the World Games
- Lifesaving
- Surf lifesaving
