= USLA =

USLA may refer to:

- Unitatea Specială de Luptă Antiteroristă, a Romanian special forces unit, now the Brigada Antiteroristă
- United States Lifesaving Association
- United States of Latin Africa
- Ural State Law Academy
