= Lifesaving (sport) =

Aquatic sport

Lifesaving sport
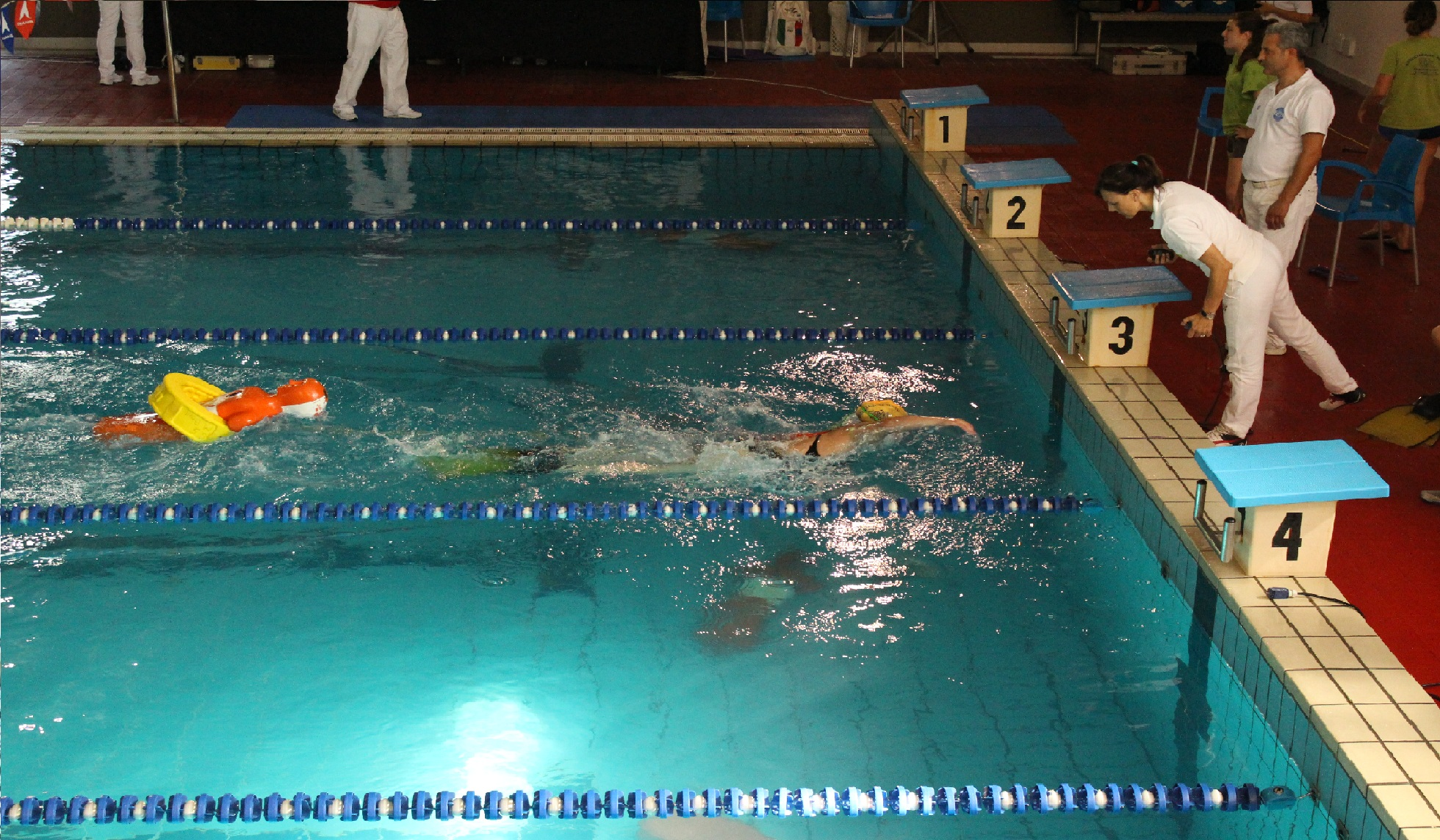
- A phase of a Lifesaving competition.
- Highest governing body: International Life Saving Federation
- First contested: early 20th century

Characteristics
- Contact: No
- Mixed-sex: Yes
- Type: Aquatic sport

Presence
- Country or region: Worldwide
- Olympic: No
- World Games: Pool: 1985 – present; Beach: 2001 – 2009

Lifesaving, also known as lifesaving sport, is a group of sports disciplines based on the practices of lifesaving.

The sport is overseen by the International Life Saving Federation (ILS), which was established on 27 March 1910 in Paris. It is contested at the World Games, a multi-sport event for IOC-recognized sporting events that are not yet in the programme of the Olympic Games.

== History ==
The ILS states that 'lifesaving sport was primarily intended to encourage lifesavers to develop, maintain and improve the essential physical and mental skills needed to save lives in the aquatic environment.' The sport consists of a series of competition disciplines intended 'to further develop and demonstrate lifesaving skills, fitness and motivation'.

The world governing body for life saving sport is the ILS. Each nation within has a national governing body. In some nations (including the United Kingdom, Australia and New Zealand) there are numerous governing bodies affiliated to the ILS. This is often due to various components of life saving within a nation being focused on by separate organisations. (e.g. Royal Life Saving Society focusing mainly on pool safety and Surf Life Saving Association focusing on beach safety). Every two years the ILS organises the Lifesaving World Championships.

Competitive lifesaving is carried out widely in the UK, with clubs including Leeds Phoenix Lifesaving, Belfast Olympia Lifesaving club, Blyth Lifesaving club and Crawley Town LSC. Competitions at university level are organised through BULSCA. Lifesaving has progressed significantly becoming a modern and widely known sport and occupation.

In April 2024, ILS and Surf Life Saving Australia announced an intent to campaign for the inclusion of beach livesaving sport as an optional sport at the 2032 Summer Olympics in Brisbane.

== Disciplines ==
Lifesaving sport is divided into disciplines of pool and beach events based on skills and rescues. Beach events deal in surf lifesaving activities, including disciplines such as beach flags, rescue tube, beach sprinting, paddleboarding, surf ski, surfing, and oceanman/oceanwoman (a 1,200-metre medley of swimming, paddleboard, surf ski, surfing, and a beach sprint). Pool events largely consist of freestyle swimming disciplines with an added rescue component. The disciplines contested at the 2022 World Games included:

- Manikin carry and Rescue medley: A freestyle swim where the swimmer must also dive to retrieve a sunken mannequin, then surface and carry it to the finish line with them. Some disciplines also require the swimmers to wear fins.
- Manikin tow: A freestyle swim where the swimmer must swim with fins and carry a rescue tube, and then tow a mannequin the remaining distance.
- Obstacle swim: A freestyle swim where the swimmers must swim under immersed obstacles.
- Super lifesaver: a 200-metre freestyle swim where the swimmers must swim 75 metres to retrieve a submerged mannequin, and then tow another mannequin the remaining distance with a rescue tube.
- Line throw: A competitor must throw an unweighted line to retrieve a teammate from the pool.

== Competitions ==
- Lifesaving World Championships (LWC)
- Lifesaving at the World Games

== See also ==
- Surf lifesaving
- List of world records in lifesaving
