= Bronze Medallion (United Kingdom) =

Award by the Royal Life Saving Society UK

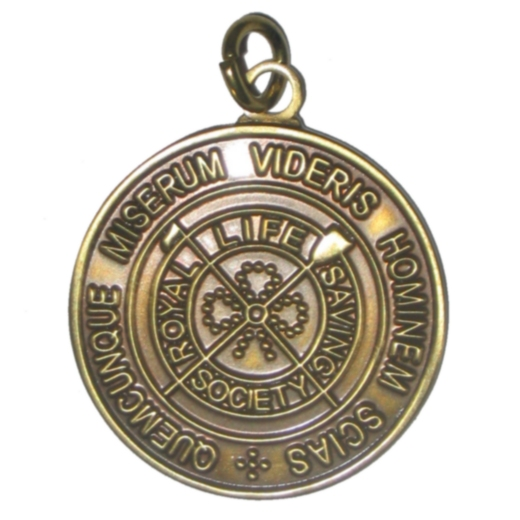
The RLSS UK Bronze Medallion

The Bronze Medallion was the flagship award of the Royal Life Saving Society UK until 2012. It was open to those age 14 years of age and over, and consists of resuscitation, theory questions on water safety, self rescue, and rescue principles, and a practical swimming pool based assessment.

A summary of the nine tests (Dec 2006) is as follows:

1. Suspected Drowning; includes mouth-to-mouth/nose resuscitation and the recovery position.

2. Suspected Heart Attack; includes mouth-to-mouth/nose resuscitation, CPR and the recovery position.

3. Land-Based Rescue; includes use of various rescue methods in which the rescuer remains on the shore. Non-Contact.

4. Wade/Swim Rescue; includes use of various rescue methods in which the rescuer has to enter the water. Non-Contact.

5. Timed Swim/Tow; 50m swim, 50m tow using item of clothing. Must be completed within 3min15secs from arriving at pool edge to casualty touching land. Non-Contact.

6. Contact Tow with Self-Defence; 20m swim, 20m tow during which the casualty will try to attack the rescuer at random. Close-Contact.

7. Unconscious Casualty; 20m swim, 20m tow with an unconscious casualty. Includes surface dive, water-based mouth-to-mouth/nose resuscitation, use of bystander for help to get casualty onto dry land and the recovery position.

8. Unknown Scenario; students face an unknown scenario in which they will have to successfully rescue at least two casualties from the water. Casualties may be in any condition and safety resources are varied.

9.You can apply for bronze medallion at the age of 12 as long as you have passed the rookie lifeguard course up to gold 3 otherwise you must be 14

9. Oral Examination; testing knowledge of basic first-aid, diagnosis, water safety etc.
