= 1981 World Lifesaving Championships =

The 1981 Lifesaving World Championships were conducted between 1–3 May 1981 at Kuta Beach on the island of Bali in Indonesia. They were held under the auspices of World Lifesaving (WLS), one of the two precursor organisations to the International Life Saving Federation (ILS). 15 Ocean and Beach events were held purely for competitors representing their club teams. Some 47 club teams participated from 5 countries including Australia, Hong Kong, Indonesia, New Zealand, and the United Kingdom.

It was the first World Lifesaving Championships for Clubs.

== Results ==
Competition	Gold	Silver	Bronze
Surf Race	Paul Moorfoot (Southport, Australia)	Robert Nay (Northcliffe, Australia)	Craig Riddington (Manly, Australia)
Rescue Tube Rescue Race	Southport, Australia	Freshwater, Australia	North Cronulla, Australia
Board Race	Mick Porra (Coogee, Australia)	Bruce Kolkka (Northcliffe, Australia)	Steve Warren (North Cronulla, Australia)
Ski Race	Murray Braund (Avoca, Australia)	Paul MacDonald (Muriwai, New Zealand)	Peter McGrath (Northcliffe, Australia)
Iron Man	Mark Bennetts (Southport, Australia)	Robert Nay (Northcliffe, Australia)	Gray Parkes (North cronulla, Australia)
Taplin Relay	Southport, Australia	North Cronulla, Australia	Manly, Australia
Beach Sprint	Clayton Kearney (Freshwater, Australia)	Warren Peters (Ocean Beach, Australia)	Geoffrey Bates (North Cronulla, Australia)
Beach Flags	Michael Jones (Redhead, Australia)	Robert Pickard (Fremantle, Australia)	Mark Walters (Avoca, Australia)
Beach Relay	Cronulla, Australia	North Cronulla, Australia	Swansea Belmont, Australia
Surf Boat Race	City of Perth, Australia	Coogee, Australia	Queenscliff, Australia
Run Swim Run	Robert Nay (Northcliffe, Australia)	Laurence Reece (Southport, Australia)	Gray Parkes (North Cronulla)
Surf Belt Race	Paul Moorfoot (Southport, Australia)	Chris Gately (Coogee, Australia)	Darren Bogg (Freshwater, Australia)
Surf Swim Teams Race	Wanda, Australia	Southport, Australia	Northcliffe, Australia
Dearlove Relay	Wanda, Australia	Coogee, Australia	Northcliffe, Australia
Pillow Fight	Dave Clelland (Wanda)	Martin Johnson (North Cronulla, Australia)	Geoff Hicks (Moore Park, Australia)
