= 1988 Lifesaving World Championships =

Coordinates: 27.963665°S 153.415854°E

The 1988 Lifesaving World Championships were held between 22 and 27 March 1988 at the Gold Coast, Queensland, Australia.

These were the first Lifesaving World Championships to include both pool and ocean events with the pool events being conducted at the Southport Olympic Pool in Southport and the ocean events being conducted at Main Beach and Greenmount Beach. As well as being the first championships to include both pool and ocean lifesaving events, these were the first championships to conduct contests for both Interclub and International teams. Competitors representing teams from 10 countries including Australia, Canada, Germany, Great Britain, Indonesia, Japan, New Zealand, Sri Lanka, Taiwan, and the United States took part.

The National Teams competition included 5 pool and 11 ocean events, whilst the Interclub competition included 8 men's pool events, 13 men's ocean events, and 3 women's ocean events. Competitors from Australia dominated the competitions.
