= British Universities Lifesaving Clubs' Association =

- Abbreviation: BULSCA
- Formation: 2002 (24 years ago)
- Type: Sport regulation body
- Purpose: To promote Lifesaving Sport and Awards at a University level in the UK
- Region served: United Kingdom
- Members: 19 clubs
- Chair: Tom Park
- Main organ: Committee (8 members)
- Affiliations: Royal Life Saving Society UK
- Website: bulsca.co.uk

The British Universities Lifesaving Clubs' Association (BULSCA) is the governing body for lifesaving sport at the University level in the United Kingdom. It organises the university-level competition schedule, assists with the training of judges, and hosts an annual Student National Championship. BULSCA organises competitions in England, Scotland, and Wales and also includes member teams from Northern Ireland and Ireland. In recent years the club has also been represented at international competition, including the Grand Prix Moravie held in Brno, Czech Republic. For the years 2018/2019 and 2019/2020 the BULSCA championships at Swansea and Bristol respectively also played host to a team representing Greek Universities.

== History ==
Competitive lifesaving between clubs at universities across Britain began as a small collaboration between rival clubs over 15 years ago and quickly expanded as more clubs became involved. The formation of BULSCA in 2002 was in response to this growing popularity of lifesaving sport at universities; with the university lifesaving league being established in the 2002/03 season to provide a connection between the various competitions hosted by the universities over a season.

It is now not uncommon to see 20 to 30 teams at a majority of the competitions. In addition, to the BULSCA league, BULSCA introduced the Student Nationals, a full weekend of competition combining both speed events and traditional events.

As BULSCA grew in size and ambition it became necessary to form a full committee, made up of a mixture of current BULSCA members and BULSCA “old boys”. This was formed in 2007.

Today the BULSCA calendar is extensive with some clubs taking part in around 8 BULSCA league competitions a year as well as Student National Championships, and other regional, national and international competitions.

BULSCA has also provided volunteers for events such as the London Triathlon, the Blenheim Triathlon, the RLSS’s ‘Save a Baby’s Life’ and ‘Get Safe 4 Summer‘ campaigns, along with many more local small scale events. Although BULSCA predominantly exists to run the league and championships, BULSCA are now making efforts to run courses which will aid members through their lifesaving time, and to encourage participation in Lifesaving and Lifesaving Sport.

== Clubs ==
A number of Universities compete in BULSCA from across the country. As of 2026, the teams currently competing are:

- Loughborough University
- Birmingham University
- Warwick University
- University of Nottingham
- Oxford University
- Southampton University
- Sheffield Universities (Composed of members from both The University of Sheffield and Sheffield Hallam)
- Bristol University
- Plymouth University
- Swansea University

Clubs that have previously competed include:

- University of London Union
- University of St Andrews
- University of Bath
- Aberdeen University
- Cambridge University

== Competitions ==
=== League Competitions ===
Competitions take place throughout the year in line with University term dates, i.e. from October to Christmas and from January to May. Each competition is hosted by one of the member clubs. Clubs typically enter one or two teams (an "A" and "B" team), and each year there is both a league for A and B teams. There is no restriction on the number of teams a club may enter, although only "A" and "B" count towards the league. A full list of league results from the current season can be found here. Clubs may occasionally form non-counting teams with other clubs when numbers do not permit entering a full counting team

==== Fixed Events ====
These events occur at every BULSCA competition.

- Dry and wet Simulated Emergency Response Competition (commonly referred to as SERCs)
- Rope Throw Relay
- Swim and Tow

==== Variable Events ====
Hosting universities have some flexibility with these events, having to include at least one of the following events.

- Medley Relay
- Manikin Carry Relay
- Obstacles Relay

=== League results ===
University and Club	"A" League Ranking (2008–09)	"B" League Ranking (2008–09)	"A" League Ranking (2013–14)	"B" League Ranking (2013–14)	"A" League Ranking (2014–15)	"B" League Ranking (2014–15)
University of Birmingham	3	2	3	1	1	1
University of Warwick	5	3	1	2	2	4
University of Southampton	1	1	7	6	5	5
Loughborough University	6	5	4	3	3	2
University of Nottingham	2	4	6	5	8	
University of London Union	4	8	2	4	9	
University of Plymouth	9	10	8	8	6	6
Sheffield Universities			12	10	7	3
Swansea University	11	6	9	9	10	7
University of Bristol	10		5	7	4	
Oxbridge Universities			11	12	11	
University of St Andrews	13		10	9		
University of Bath	7	7				
Aberdeen University	8	9				
Cambridge University	12					
Oxford University	14					

=== Championships ===
BULSCA also host BULSCA Student National Championships every year. This competition takes place over 2 days with teams competing in squads of 12 (6 male and 6 female rather than the usual teams of 4 mixed). On the Saturday teams compete in speed lifesaving events in teams and individually. On the Sunday the teams compete in teams of 4 in the same events as a normal league competition. The winner of the competition is the squad which performs best over the 2 days.

==== Individual Speeds Events ====
- Line Throw
- 200m Obstacles
- 200m Super Lifesaver
- 50m Manikin Carry
- 100m Rescue Medley
- 100m Manikin Tow with Fins
- 100m Manikin Carry with Fins

==== Team Speeds Events ====
- 4 x Line Throw
- 4 x 50m Obstacles
- 4 x 25m Manikin Carry
- 4 x 50m Medley Relay

==== Sunday Events ====
- Dry Simulated Emergency Response Competition
- RNLI Simulated Emergency Response Competition
- Wet Simulated Emergency Response Competition
- Line Throw Relay
- Swim Tow Relay
