= Commonwealth Pool Lifesaving Championships =

Commonwealth Lifesaving Championships
- Purpose: lifesaving sport event for members of the Commonwealth
- Frequency: Every 2 years
- Inaugurated: Eastbourne, England in 2001
- Website: http://www.rlsscommonwealth.org/

The Commonwealth Pool Lifesaving Championships is an international event where swimmers from around the Commonwealth take part in lifesaving sport events. The championship is under the auspices of The Royal Lifesaving Society which has Her Majesty Queen Elizabeth II as patron.

== Conditions of Competition ==
Each team may send 5 Competitors, One Male team, and One Female Team. The Teams may also send a "Development Team" Every Member of the team 'MUST be 16 years old + on the start day of the championships.

In the Championships, any one from the Commonwealth can enter. The championship's teams are located in two different Divisions (Division I And Division II). These divisions were later renamed 'National' and 'Development' Division. Nations in Division I are allowed to send another team to compete in Division II.

| | | Division 1 Nations | | |
| Australia | Isle of Man | Singapore | Canada | New Zealand |
| South Africa | England | Northern Ireland | Wales | Guernsey |
Scotland
| | | Division 2 Nations | | |
| Anguilla | Guyana | Papua New Guinea | Antigua & Barbuda | India |
| St. Helena | Bahamas | Jamaica | St. Kitts & Nevis | Bangladesh |
| Jersey | St. Lucia | Barbados | Kenya | St. Vincent & The Grenadines |
| Belize | Kiribati | Samoa | Bermuda | Lesotho |
| Seychelles | Botswana | Malawi | Sierra Leone | British Virgin Islands |
| Malaysia | Solomon Islands | Brunei | Maldives | Sri Lanka |
| Cameroon | Malta | Swaziland | Cayman Islands | Mauritius |
| Tanzania | Cook Islands | Montserrat | Tonga | Cyprus |
| Mozambique | Trinidad & Tobago | Dominica | Namibia | Turks & Caicos |
| Falkland Islands | Nauru | Tuvalu | Fiji | Nigeria |
| Uganda | Gambia | Niue | Vanuatu | Ghana |
| Norfolk Island | Zambia | Gibraltar | Pakistan | Zimbabwe |
Grenada

== Events ==
Each Championship has their own Race Events:

| Division I | | Division II | |
| Race Event. | Max Entries Per Team. | Race Event. | Max Entries Per Team. |
| 200m Obstacle Swim | 2 Competitors | 100m Obstacle Swim | 2 Competitors |
| 50m Manikin Carry | 2 Competitors | | |
| Rescue Medley | 2 Competitors | | |
| 100m Manikin Carry With Fins | 2 Competitors | 100m Manikin Carry With Fins | 2 Competitors |
| 100m Manikin Tow with Fins | 2 Competitors | 100m Manikin Tow with Fins | 2 Competitors |
| 200m Superlifesaver | 2 Competitors | 100m Superlifesaver | 2 Competitors |
| Line Throw | 2 Teams | Line Throw | 2 Teams |
| 4 x 25m Manikin Relay | 1 Team ( 4 members ) | | |
| 4 x 50m Obstacle Swim | 1 Team ( 4 Members ) | 4 x 50m Obstacle Swim | 1 Team ( 4 Members ) |
| 4 x 50m Medley Relay | 1 Team ( 4 Members ) | 4 x 50m Medley Relay | 1 Team ( 4 Members ) |
| Stimulated Emergency Response | 1 Team ( 4 Members ) | Stimulated Emergency Response | 1 Team ( 4 Members ) |

Scoring
| Place | Points | Place | Points | Place | Points | Place | Points |
| 1st | 20 | 5th | 13 | 9th | 8 | 13th | 4 |
| 2nd | 18 | 6th | 12 | 10th | 7 | 14th | 2 |
| 3rd | 16 | 7th | 11 | 11th | 6 | 15th | 2 |
| 4th | 14 | 8th | 10 | 12th | 5 | 16th | 1 |

Competitors Oath:

In the name of all competitors, I promise that we shall respect and abide by the rules of this championship, competing with a spirit of sportsmanship and fair play.

Officials Oath:

In the name of all officials, I promise that we shall officiate in this Championship with the impartially, honoring the rules which govern this competition and the spirit of fair play which inspires them.

Official Opening Declaration:

On behalf of the royal life saving society, I declare these Championships officially open.

== History ==
=== Eastbourne 2001 ===
The first official event took place in Eastbourne, England during the month of May. The event took place at the Sovereign Centre, a 33.3m pool 3'6" at the shallow end and 6'6" at the deep end. A total of 10 nations attended the event, including: Australia, Canada, England, Hong Kong, South Africa, Wales, Mauritius, Uganda, Jersey and Scotland. The events at this competition differed to the subsequent championships, which all took place in 50m pools. Prince Michael of Kent met all competitors at a reception meeting during the opening ceremony at the Eastbourne Hotel. Competitors later travelled to Buckingham Palace for an official reception.

National Team Scores
| Country | Points |
|---|---|
| Australia | 232 |
| Canada | 133 |
| England | 107 |
| Wales | 104 |
| South Africa | 96 |
| Scotland | 220 |
| Jersey | 22 |
| Hong Kong | 7 |
| Mauritius | 0 |
| Uganda | 0 |

=== Durban 2003 ===
The second championships were held in Durban, South Africa from the 2nd to 4 July 2003. Amongst the competitors were teams from Hong Kong, Eswatini (formerly Swaziland), Guernsey, Ivory Coast, Mozambique, Botswana, Zambia, Sri Lanka and Lesotho. This event took place at the Kings Park Pool and was the first Commonwealth Championship to take place in a 50m pool.

=== Bath 2006 ===
The third championships were held by the Royal Life Saving Society UK for the second time, this time in Bath, Somerset, England from 24 September to 29 September 2006. For the third year in a row, Australia won the National Team competition. This championships saw the introduction of the Development teams competition.

National Team Scores
| Country | Points |
|---|---|
| Australia | 458 |
| South Africa | 439 |
| Canada | 415 |
| England | 320 |
| Wales | 314 |
| N Ireland | 220 |
| Scotland | 178 |
| Jersey | 177 |

National Development Team Scores
| Country | Points |
|---|---|
| South Africa | 497 |
| Canada | 455 |
| Australia | 435 |
| England | 399 |
| N Ireland | 192 |

=== Edmonton 2009 ===
The 2009 Commonwealth Pool Lifesaving Championships took place in Edmonton, Canada.

The Conference took place between the 9th of June and the 11th of June, with the Championships taking place between the 12th and the 14th of June.

The venue of the Championships was The Kinsmen Sports Center. The Kinsmen Sports Centre is one of the world's finest fitness and recreation facilities. Located in Edmonton's beautiful river valley, the centre offers facilities for many sports. It is owned and operated by the City of Edmonton. This swimming complex was built for the 1978 Commonwealth Games. The facility was upgraded in 1998 and again in 2006. It has hosted major sport events including international water polo championships, the 1983 University Games and World Cup Swimming from 1998 to 2001.

Competition pool: 10 lanes, 50m long x 25m wide with a depth of 2 to 2.3m.

The Alberta and Northern Territories Branch of The Lifesaving Society, Canada hosted this Championships.

National Team Scores
| Country | Points |
|---|---|
| Australia | 579 |
| Canada | 468 |
| South Africa | 398 |
| England | 385 |
| Hong Kong | 274 |
| Wales | 247 |
| Scotland | 205 |
| Northern Ireland | 163 |
| New Zealand | 97 |

=== Durban 2011 ===
The 2011 Commonwealth Lifesaving Championships took place in Durban, South Africa from 27 September to 1 October 2011. The event took place at the Kings Park Pool. The John Long Trophy was introduced at this competition. It is awarded to first place team in the Development Team competition.

=== Canberra 2013 ===
The 2013 Commonwealth Lifesaving Championships was held in Canberra, Australia from 4 September to 8 September 2013. The RLSSA hosted the event which took place at the Australian Institute of Sport. Athletes stayed on the compound leading up to the meet. The championships reception was held at Parliament House.

National Team Scores
| Country | Points |
|---|---|
| Australia | 607 |
| England | 470 |
| South Africa | 387 |
| Canada | 301 |
| Northern Ireland | 301 |
| Hong Kong | 228 |
| Scotland | 218 |
| Singapore | 151 |
| India | 98 |
| Wales | 61 |

Development Team Scores
| Country | Points |
|---|---|
| Australia | 608 |
| England | 426 |
| South Africa | 425 |
| Canada | 393 |
| Wales | 321 |
| Northern Ireland | 27 |

=== Durban 2017 ===
The Royal Life Saving Society – Commonwealth Drowning Prevention announced the Commonwealth Festival Of Lifesaving would take place in South Africa in 2017. The Festival ran from 8 to 12 August 2017 at the King’s Park Swimming Complex, Durban, KwaZulu Natal, South Africa. The 100m Rescue Medley, 200m Obstacles and 4x50m Obstacle relay, Line Throw and Team SERC were removed from the competition, and Aquatic SERC, Dry SERC (Resuscitation), 12.5 m Line Throw, 100m Lifesaving Medley Swim and 50m Swim and Non-Contact Tow were added.

National Team Scores
| Country | Points |
|---|---|
| Australia | 316 |
| England | 287 |
| South Africa | 264 |
| Mauritius | 161 |
| Scotland | 130 |

Development Team Scores
| Country | Points |
|---|---|
| Australia | 332 |
| South Africa | 328 |
| England | 262 |
| Hong Kong | 222 |
| Canada | 187 |
| Scotland | 26 |

=== Leeds 2019 ===
The Royal Lifesaving Society UK hosted the 2019 edition of the Commonwealth Lifesaving Championships (again under the banner of ‘Festival of Lifesaving’). The event took place at the John Charles Centre for Sport, in Leeds, England. The opening and closing ceremony were held at the South Leeds Stadium, home of the Hunslet Hawks Rugby League team.

The event took the same format at the 2017 edition. The competition took place over 3 days, without 200m Obstacle swim, obstacle relay, rescue medley, team SERC or line throw.

== See also ==
- Royal Life Saving Society Commonwealth
