= International Life Saving Federation =

Umbrella organization of the national lifesaving organizations

- Abbreviation: ILS
- Predecessor: Fédération Internationale de Sauvetage Aquatique (FIS) and World Life Saving (WLS).
- Formation: 24 February 1993; 33 years ago in Brussels
- Type: INGO
- Legal status: Association internationale sans but lucrative, incorporated in Belgium
- Purpose: Drowning prevention Promotion of lifesaving Lifesaving sport
- Location: Gemeenteplein 26 3010 Leuven, Belgium
- Region served: International
- Members: National federations
- President: Graham Ford (2012–28)
- Affiliations: SportAccord; ARISF; IWGA
- Website: http://www.ilsf.org/

The International Life Saving Federation (ILS) is an organisation for drowning prevention, water safety, lifesaving and lifesaving sports.

== Definition ==
The International Life Saving Federation (ILS) comprises over 130 national life saving organisations/federations aiming at improving water safety, drowning prevention, water rescue, lifesaving and lifeguarding and lifesaving sport.

The supreme authority of ILS is the General Assembly on which member organisations are represented. The Elective General Assembly elects a board of directors. The board of directors conducts the business of ILS between meetings of the General Assembly and is chaired by the President. The General Secretariat (Headquarters) is located in Leuven (Belgium) and houses the administration.

ILS has four regional branches, in Africa, the Americas, Asia-Pacific and Europe. They initiate, supervise and coordinate regional activities.

ILS commissions are composed of committees and working groups responsible for the management, development and technical aspects of each major ILS field of activity.

ILS cooperates with partner organisations, governments, non-government organisations (NGOs) and sponsors to promote lifesaving worldwide.

== Lifesaving sport ==
=== Lifesaving sport disciplines ===
As of July 2013, lifesaving sport (also known as competitive lifesaving) at the international level consists of the following disciplines – 100m Manikin Tow with Fins, 100m Obstacle Swim (Masters), 100m Rescue Medley, 200m Obstacle Swim, 200m Super Lifesaver, 4x25m Manikin Relay, 4x50m Medley Relay, 4x50m Obstacle Relay, 50m Manikin Carry, Line Throw, Simulated Emergency Response Competition (SERC), 100m Manikin Carry with Fins, Beach Flags, Beach Relay, Beach Run, Beach Sprint, Board Race, Board Relay, Board Rescue, Inflatable Rescue Boat (IRB) Rescue, IRB Rescue Tube Rescue, IRB Team Rescue, Oceanman – Oceanwoman, Oceanman Relay, Rescue Tube Race, Rescue Tube Rescue, Run Swim Run, Surf Boat Race, Surf Race, Surf ski Race, Surf Ski Relay and Surf Teams Race.

=== Lifesaving World championships ===
The Lifesaving World Championships which are known as the 'Rescue' series (i.e. Rescue 2008), are organised by the ILS every two years. The World Championships consist of National Teams World Championships, Interclub Teams World Championships, Masters World Championships, Surfboats World Championships and IRB World Championships. Additional championships can include events such as March Past and Long Distance Race. The World Championships attract between 3,000 and 5,000 competitors and officials, and are conducted over a period of 12 to 14 days.

=== Other international events ===
As of July 2013, lifesaving sport (both pool and beach-surf) is included in the following international events:

- The World Games which are organised by the International World Games Association (IWGA) every four years in the year immediately following the Summer Olympic Games.
- The Military World Games which are organised by the International Military Sports Council (CISM) every four years,
- The World Masters Games which are sponsored by the International Masters Games Association (IMGA) are held every four years,
- The Commonwealth Lifesaving Championships which are organised by the Royal Life Saving Society Commonwealth every two years,
- The Military Swimming and Lifesaving World Championships are held bi-annually by the CISM as part of the Military World Championships.

== Certification ==
The ILS issues certificates to qualified persons who wish for international recognition for their level of training where this meets the minimum internationally recognised competencies published by ILS. As of July 2013, certificates are available for the following training levels: Junior Lifesaver, Lifesaver, Lifeguard Pool, Lifeguard Inland Open Water, Lifeguard Surf, Instructor Junior Lifesaver, Instructor Lifesaver, Instructor Pool Lifeguard, Instructor Inland Open Water Lifeguard, Instructor Surf Lifeguard, Open Water Diver, Rescue Diver, Rescue Dive Master, Instructor 1 Rescue Dive, Instructor 2 Rescue Dive, Instructor 3 Rescue Dive, Rescue Boat Crew, Rescue Boat Driver, Jet ski Operator, AED Certificates, Instructor AED, K9 Certificate and K9 Instructor.

== Recognition, affiliations and agreements ==
Organisations which recognise ILS as the international federation for lifesaving sport include the International Olympic Committee (IOC), SportAccord, the World Games and the World Anti-Doping Agency (WADA). ILS also is a member of the Association of IOC Recognised International Sports Federations (ARISF). ILS has an agreement with the Confédération Mondiale des Activités Subaquatiques (CMAS) signed on 21 October 1994 regarding recognition of the ILS rescue diver and instructor certification program.

== Members ==
ILS membership which consists of 100 national federations, includes the following organisations:

Australia

- Royal Life Saving Society Australia
- Surf Life Saving Australia

Canada

- Lifesaving Society

European Union

- Austrian Water Rescue Federation
- Belgian Life Saving Federation
- Croatian Water Life Saving Service
- Czech Water Rescue Service
- French Federation of Lifesaving and First Aid
- Royal Spanish Livesaving Association
- ect.

United Kingdom

- Royal Life Saving Society UK
- Royal National Lifeboat Institution

United States

- United States Lifesaving Association
- YMCA of the USA.

India

- Rashtriya Life Saving Society

Turkey

- Türkiye Sualtı Sporları Federasyonu

Others

- Royal Life Saving Society Commonwealth

== See also ==
- Confédération Mondiale des Activités Subaquatiques
- AIDA International
- List of world records in life saving
- World Life Saving Championships
- Lifeguard
