= 1983 Lifesaving World Championships =

The 1983 Lifesaving World Championships were held between 17 and 21 April 1983, on the island of Oahu in Hawaii, United States of America. Twenty-two ocean and beach events were contested at several beach venues, including: North Beach; Makapuu Beach; Waikiki; and Bellows Beach.
