= Lifesaving =

Act involving rescue, resuscitation, and first aid

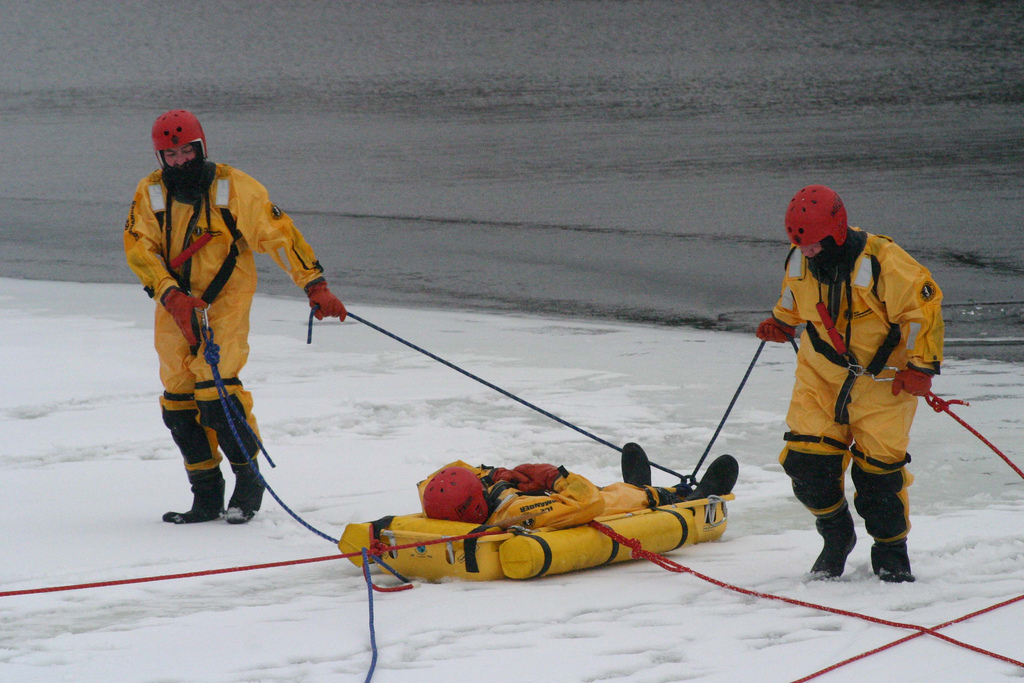
Ice rescue training in Canada

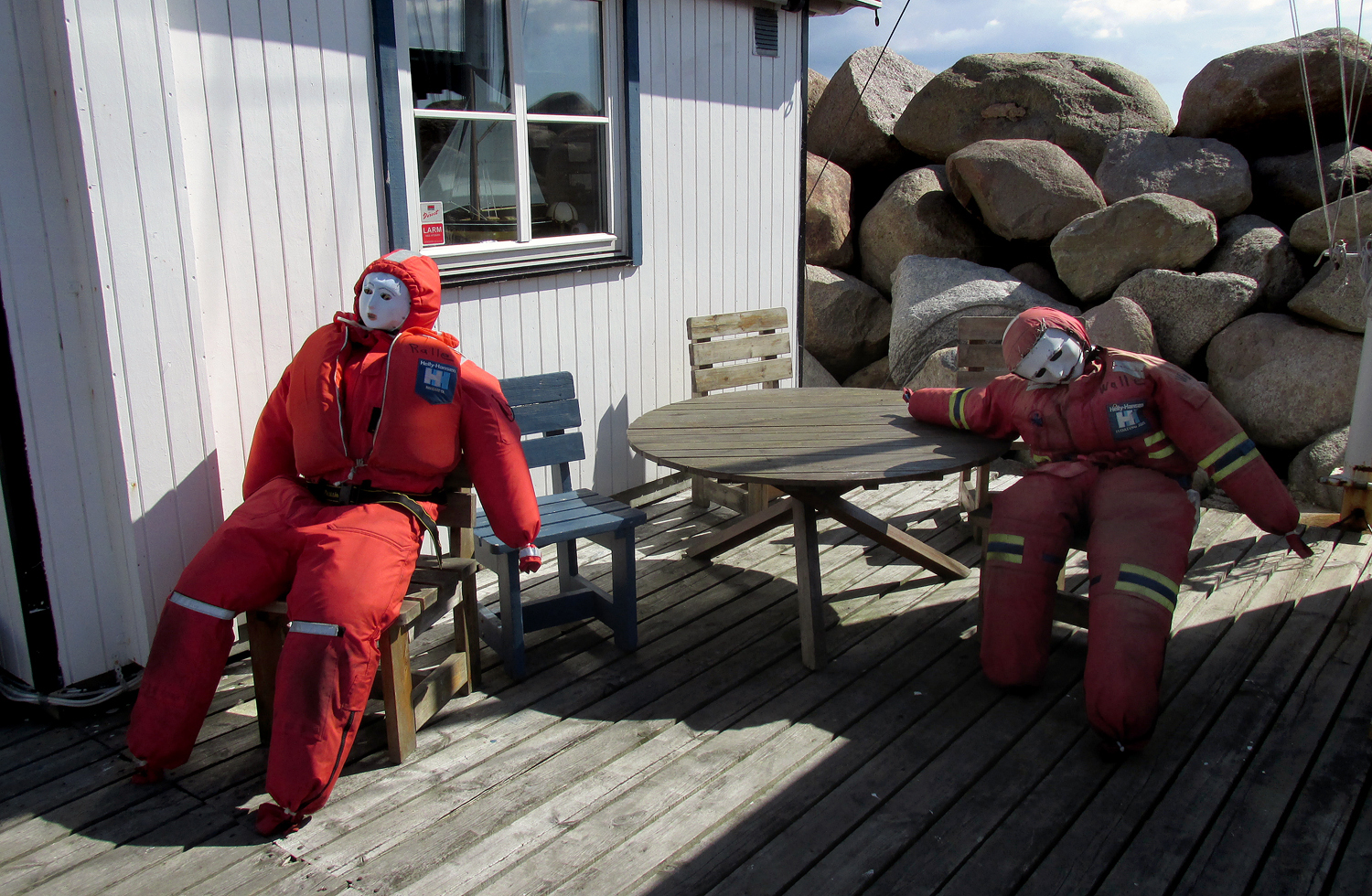
Lifesaving doll dummies for rescue training in water

Lifesaving is the act involving rescue, resuscitation, and first aid. It often refers to water safety and aquatic rescue; however, it could include ice rescue, flood and river rescue, swimming pool rescue, and other emergency medical services. Lifesaving also refers to sport where lifesavers compete based on skills, technique, speed, and teamwork. Lifesaving activities specialized in an oceanic environment are called surf lifesaving or coastal lifesaving.

Those who participate in lifesaving activities as a volunteer are called lifesavers, and those who are employed to professionally perform lifesaving activities are called lifeguards. Surf lifesaving is a particularly common application. Lifesaving can also be developed as an aquatic sport.

== History ==
=== Origins ===
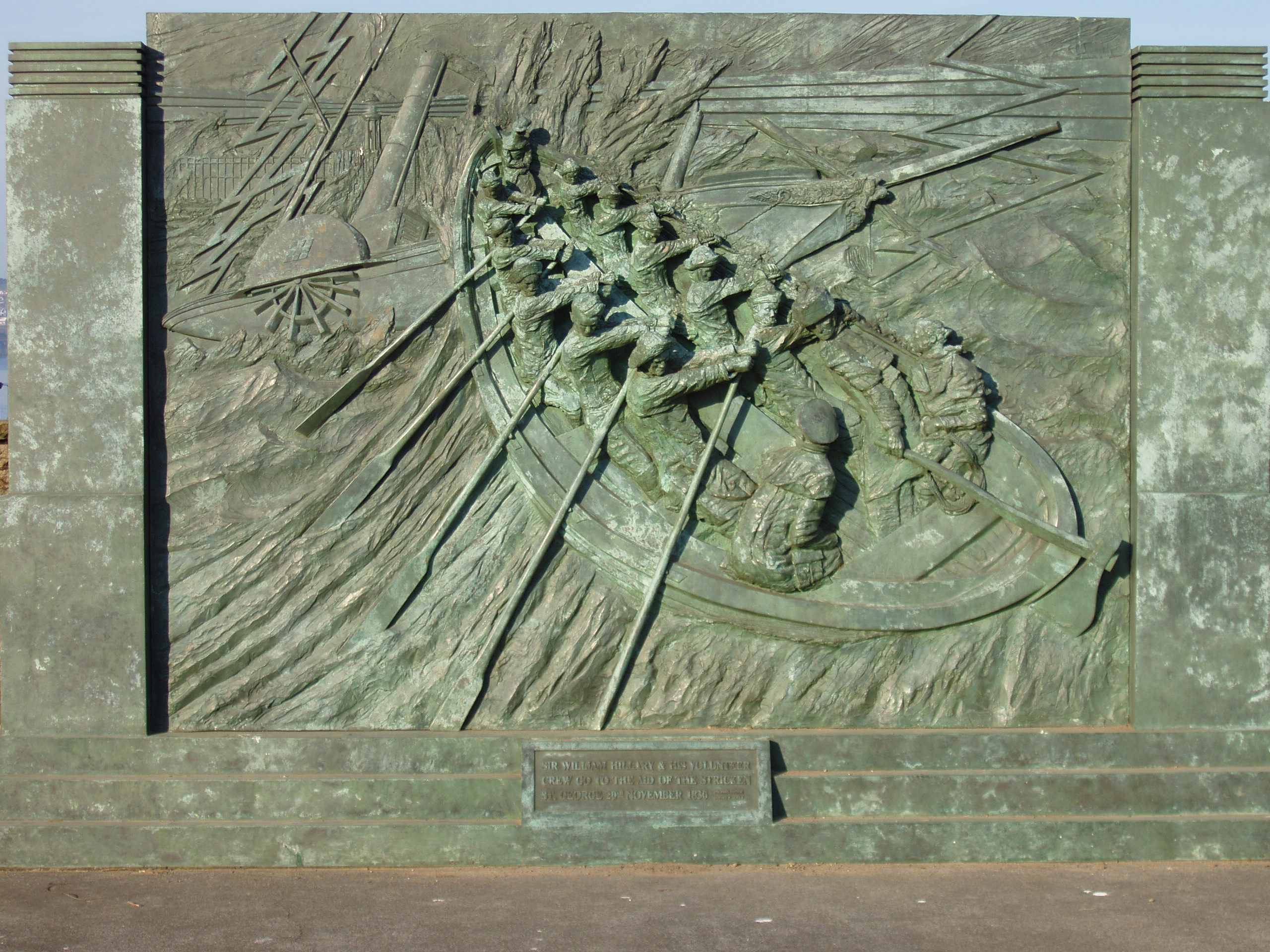
Memorial in Douglas, Isle of Man, to one of RNLI's earliest rescues: rescuing the sailors from the St George in 1830.

In the early nineteenth century, most seamen did not swim; swimming was not considered a recreational sport. Working aloft or trimming sails was always dangerous as just one single misjudged step could send a man crashing to the deck or over the side. Normally the odds of rescue were slim to none at all. Typically, sailing vessels could not change sails or lower a boat quickly nor did their crews practice rescue maneuvers. Additionally, a drowning man in anything more than flat and calm water was hard to spot.

On Wednesday 12 September 1804, the log of HMS Victory, recorded a unique rescue at sea, "Moderate Breezes and hazy, shifted the main sails, at 9 tacked at 9.55 James Archibald, Seaman fell overboard, downed Cutter and got him safe in, being saved by Mr. Edward Flin masters mate, jumping overboard after him." Edward Flin's action was witnessed by Lord Horatio Nelson, who was so impressed by Flin's heroic action, that he promoted him on the spot to Lieutenant in HMS Bittern.

On 4 October 1843 a similar mishap was recorded in a log entry of the frigate USS United States (1797). "From 4 to 8 moderate breezes and clear weather at 5.22 David Black (Cooper) fell overboard, hove to with maintop sail to the mast and sent the Barge & 2nd Cutter in search of him... At 1030 hove to and hoisted up the 2nd Cutter all search proving ineffectual"Herman Melville, who joined the USS United States in Oahu, as an Ordinary Seaman, later used this incident in his novel White Jacket. There, David Black becomes “Bungs,” a man ironically charged with maintaining the frigate’s cork life-buoys, and who is said to have exclaimed, “I will never go a loft, and don’t intend to fall overboard.” Melville adds the next day Black fell over the side and after a five hour search the frigate resumed course.

The first life saving organization, the Royal National Institution for the Preservation of Life from Shipwreck, was established in England in 1824 by Sir William Hillary. While living on the Isle of Man in 1808, he became aware of the treacherous nature of the Irish Sea, with many ships being wrecked around the Manx coast. He soon drew up plans for a national lifeboat service manned by trained crews, but received little response from the Admiralty.

However, on appealing to the more philanthropic members of London society, the plans were adopted and, with the help of two members of Parliament (Robert Wilson and George Hibbert), the National Institution for the Preservation of Life from Shipwreck was founded in 1824.

One of the Institution's first rescues was of the packet St George, which had foundered on Conister Rock at the entrance to Douglas Harbour. Hillary took part in the successful operation and everyone was ultimately rescued. Thirty years later the Institution's title was changed to the Royal National Lifeboat Institution and the first of the new lifeboats to be built was stationed at Douglas in recognition of Hillary's work.

=== Spread ===
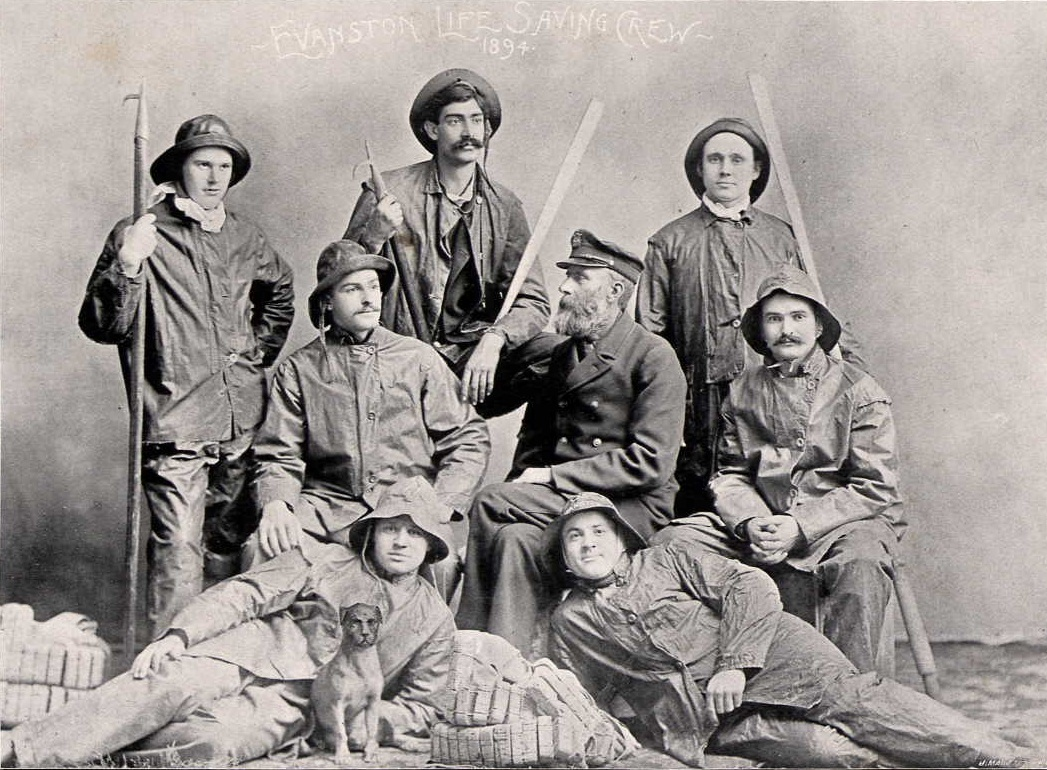
Evanston Life Saving Crew (Evanston, Illinois), 1894

Similar services were established in other countries, in Belgium (1838), Denmark (1848), United States (1848), Sweden (1856), France (1865), Germany (1885), Turkey (1868), Russia (1872), Italy (1879), and Spain (1880). In 1891 the Royal Life Saving Society was created to affiliate British and Irish lifesaving and lifeguarding clubs. It expanded its operations to Canada and Australia in 1894. In 1913 the DLRG was founded in Germany.

The first international lifesaving conference was held in Marseille, France in 1878, but it was not until 1910 that the first international lifesaving organisation, FIS (Fédération Internationale de Sauvetage Aquatique), was founded.

In 1971 Australia, Great Britain, New Zealand, South Africa, and the United States founded another international organization called World Life Saving (WLS). FIS and WLS merged into a new organisation, International Life Saving Federation (ILS) in 1993 with its headquarters in Leuven, Belgium.

=== International Life Saving Federation ===
The International Life Saving Federation (ILS) was established on 27 March 1910 in Paris, France. The ILS is primarily known as the world authority and head in the global effort to "prevent drowning and regroups national life saving organisations/federations aiming at improving water safety, water rescue, lifesaving and lifeguarding and lifesaving sport".

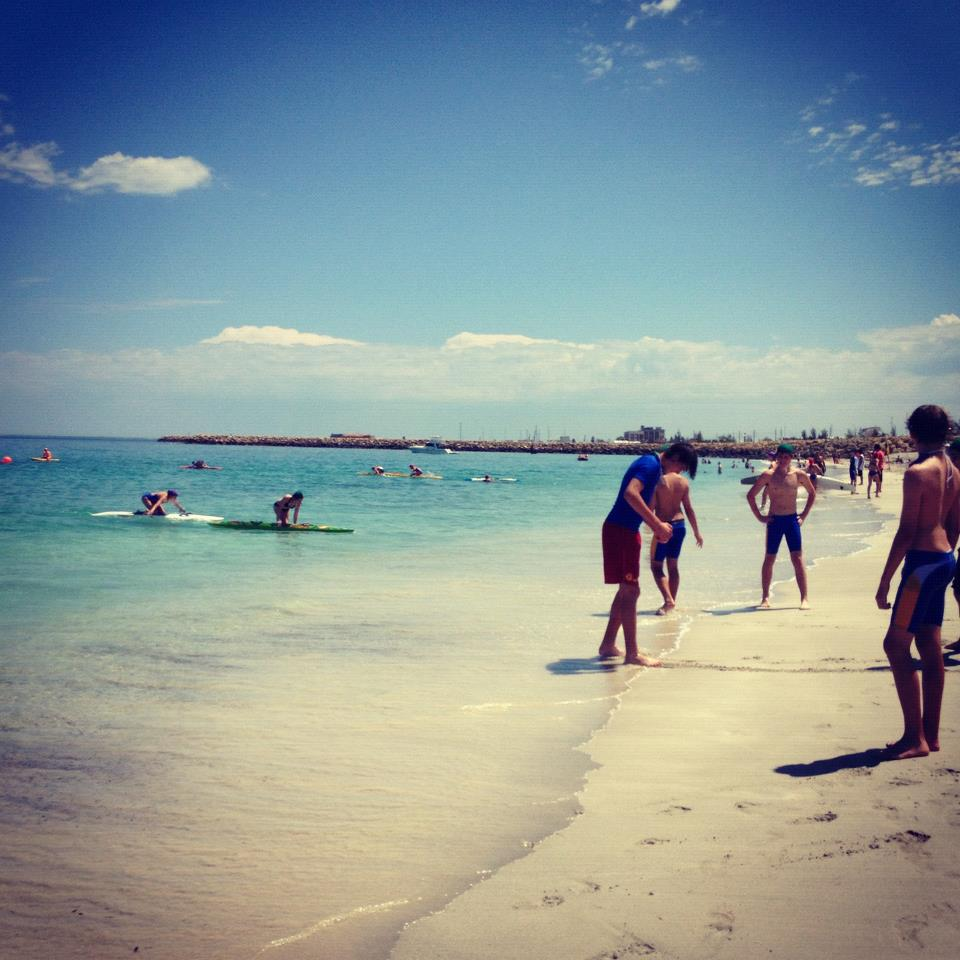
Coogee Beach Surf Lifesaving Club

== Activities ==
Surf lifesaving developed in Australia and is often simply called "lifesaving". It focuses on drowning prevention and rescue in a coastal setting. General lifesaving does not limit its activities to beaches - its aim is to promote water safety around ponds, lakes, rivers, pools, in the home, at school and in any other applicable environments. This is why landlocked countries like Switzerland, Austria, Kazakhstan, Macedonia, Serbia, Azerbaijan, Czech Republic, and Slovakia, are also full members of ILS.

Lifesavers are volunteers and usually stationed at a club house. They provide training for lifesaver/lifeguard qualifications as well as educating the general public.

== As a sport ==
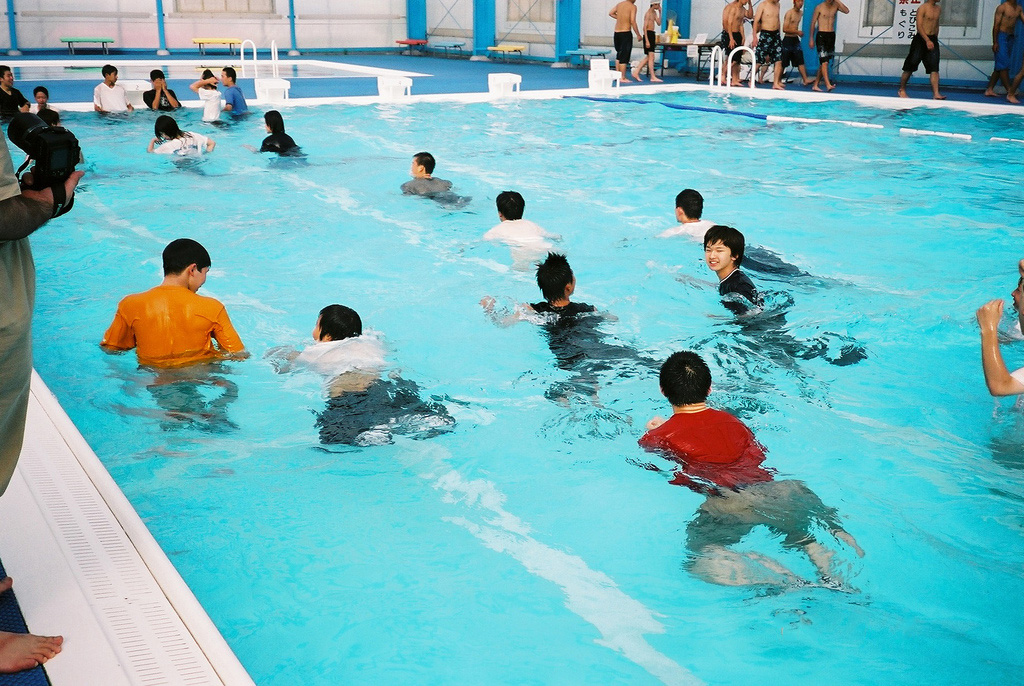
Boy scouts taking a lifesaving lesson. Chiba, Japan

Lifesaving has become a growing sport in many countries. The sport can be contested in swimming pools or on beaches in the surf, each being a separate discipline of the sport.

Lifesaving is one of the official sports of The World Games, a quadrennial multi-sport event for sports and disciplines that are not in the Olympic programme.

== Cardiopulmonary resuscitation ==
Cardiopulmonary resuscitation, otherwise known as CPR, is the most common form of lifesaving. CPR can be easily understood through this simplified table.

	ADULT and older CHILD	CHILD 1 to 8 yrs	BABY up to 1 yr
CPR ratios for 1 person	30 compressions to 2 breaths	30 compressions to 2 breaths	30 compressions to 2 puffs
CPR ratios for 2 persons	30 compressions to 2 breaths	30 compressions to 2 breaths	30 compressions to 2 puffs
Chest pressure	2 hands	1-2 hands	2 fingers
CPR compression rate	Approximately 100 per minute	Approximately 100 per minute	Approximately 100 per minute
Compression depth	One-third of a chest depth	One-third of a chest depth	One-third of a chest depth
Head tilt	Maximum	Minimum	None
Rescue breaths	2 full breaths	2 small breaths	2 puffs
Breathing rate	1 breath in 1 second	1 small breath in 1 second	1 puff in 1 second

=== DRSABCD ===
All collapsed victims should be carefully assessed to decide what emergency care is needed. This method of assessment is known as DRSABCD, this method is explained in the following table.

D	Check for Dangers
R	Check Response
S	Send for help
A	Clear and open the Airway
B	Check for normal Breathing
C	Give 30 chest Compressions at 100 per minute, followed by 2 rescue breaths
D	Defibrillate – attach AED as soon as available. Follow the prompts.

== See also ==
- Commonwealth Pool Lifesaving Championships
- Rashtriya Life Saving Society (India)
- Royal Life Saving Society Australia
- Royal Life Saving Society Commonwealth
- Royal Life Saving Society of Canada
- Surf ski
- United States Lifesaving Association
- United States Life-Saving Service
- Adolph Kiefer
