= Royal Life Saving Society Commonwealth =

The Royal Life Saving Society - Commonwealth is the umbrella organisation that links together lifesaving societies in the Commonwealth of Nations. The RLSS-Commonwealth organises the Commonwealth Lifesaving Championships. The Society hosts the Quinquennial Commonwealth Conference and Lifesaving Championships.

== See also ==
- Royal Life Saving Society UK
- Royal Life Saving Society Australia
- Royal Life Saving Society of Canada
