= United States Lifesaving Association =

Nonprofit professional association

- Predecessor: Surf Life Saving Association of America; National Surf Life Saving Association
- Formation: 1964; 62 years ago
- Founded at: Los Angeles, California
- Purpose: '"To reduce the incidence of death and injury in the aquatic environment."
- Headquarters: Huntington Beach, California, U.S.

The United States Lifesaving Association is a nonprofit professional association of beach lifeguards and open water rescuers in the United States.

== History ==
The United States Lifesaving Association's predecessor organization was founded in 1956 by lifeguard agencies in and around Los Angeles, California, as the Surf Life Saving Association of America to compete in an international lifesaving competition held concurrently with the 1956 Summer Olympics in Australia. Later, in 1964, the group renamed itself the National Surf Life Saving Association to include lifeguard agencies along the coast of California which is viewed as the official beginning of the organization. As it grew, in 1971, the United States Lifesaving Association was a founding member of World Life Saving which later merged into the International Life Saving Federation. In 1979, as part of an effort to expand its scope nationally it renamed itself to the United States Lifesaving Association and opened membership to any lifesaving or rescue service.

The organization has held organized lifesaving competitions since 1965 with the first national competition organized in 1980 and continuing annually.

== Operation ==
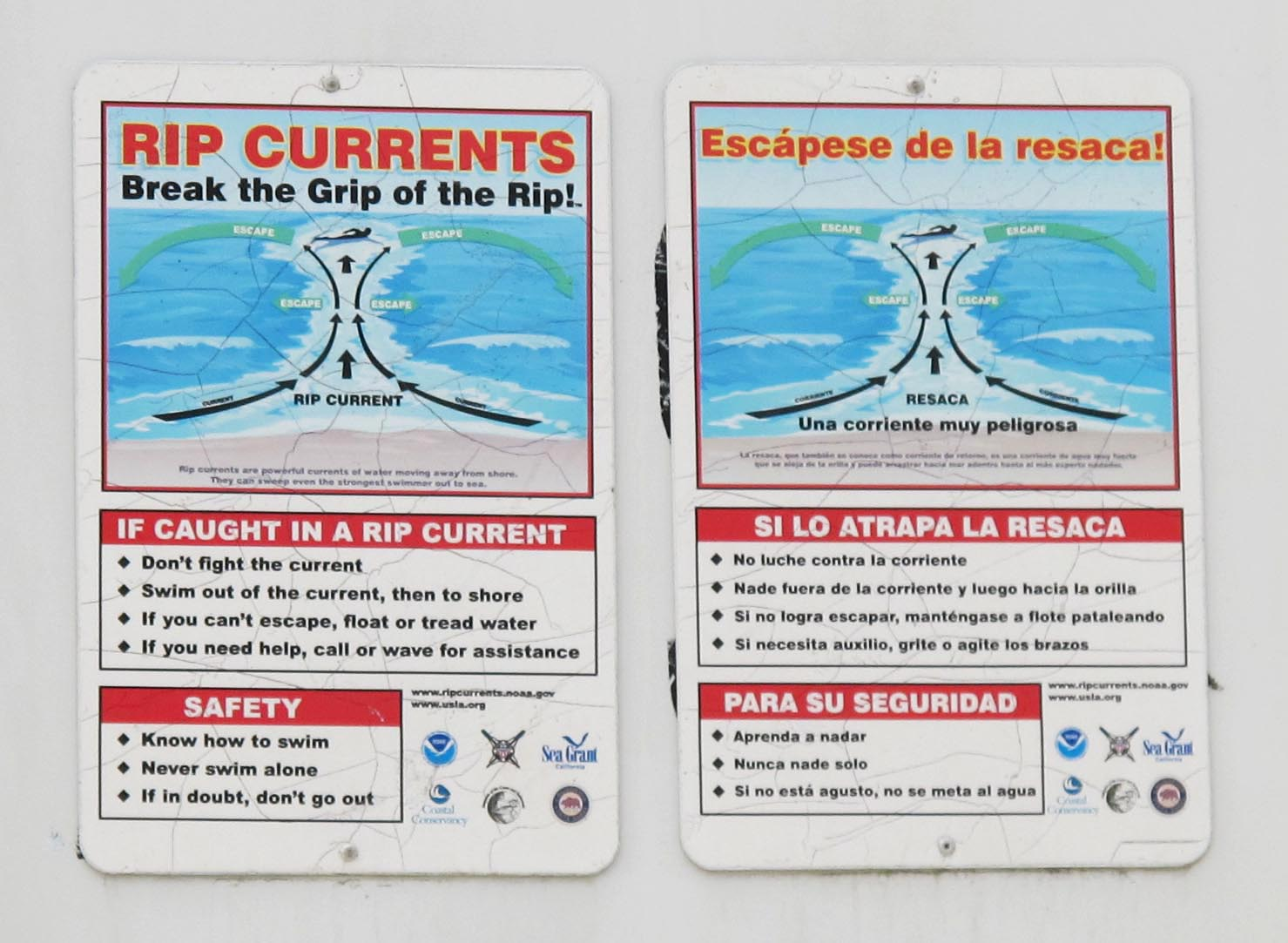
A rip current warning sign made in cooperation with the United States Lifesaving Association

The stated goal of the United States Lifesaving Association is to "Establish and maintain high standards of professional surf and open water lifesaving for the maximizing of public safety." Alongside the International Life Saving Federation, the United States Lifesaving Association created a standardized system of beach warning flags. The organization also developed and maintains a national training and qualification manual for open water lifesaving as well as an accreditation program for local training programs. Additionally, the United States Lifesaving Association partnered with the United States National Oceanic and Atmospheric Administration to create a national educational program concerning rip currents.

The organization is made up of over 100 local chapters which host community lectures and disseminate safety information locally. It is governed by a board of directors made up of individuals determined by regional subdivision which meets biannually.

The United States Lifesaving Association annually tabulates statistics from its chapters on drownings, rescues, and other lifesaving incidents. In 2001, based on ten years of data, the organization calculated that the chance that an individual will drown at a beach staffed by United States Lifesaving Association affiliated lifeguards as 1 in 18 million or 0.0000056% and has remained constant in the years since.
