= Royal Life Saving Society Australia =

Australian lifesaving organisation

The Royal Life Saving Society Australia (RLSSA) is a water safety, swimming and lifesaving education organisation in Australia. RLSSA provides courses in water safety, lifesaving and resuscitation.

It awards the Bronze Medallion.

== See also ==
- Royal Life Saving Society UK
- Royal Life Saving Society of Canada
- Surf Life Saving Australia
- Ithaca–Caloundra City Life Saving Club
