= Royal Life Saving Society UK =

Drowning prevention charity

Royal Lifesaving Society UK
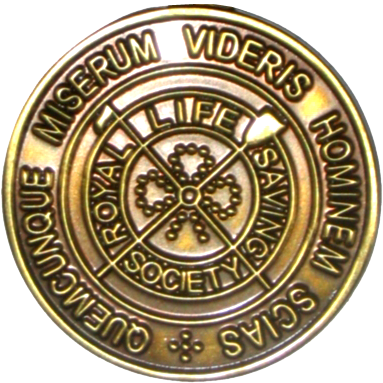
- Abbreviation: RLSS
- Established: 1891
- Type: non-profit
- Legal status: Registered charity
- Headquarters: Red Hill House
- Location: Worcester, UK
- Region served: UK, Ireland, Commonwealth
- Members: 15382
- Official language: English
- Website: www.rlss.org.uk

The Royal Life Saving Society UK is a drowning prevention charity founded in 1891 in the UK. It has had Royal Patronage since 1904.

== History ==
The Royal Life Saving Society UK is a national charity, founded in 1891 by William Henry, with the purpose 'to enhance communities, so everyone can enjoy being in, on and around water, safely; because every life is worth saving'. The Society has more than 13,000 members in 48 branches and 170 active lifesaving and lifeguarding clubs it trains over 93% of all pool and beach lifeguards throughout the UK and Ireland.

The Society has had royal patronage since 1904 starting with King Edward VII. HRH Prince Michael of Kent GCVO is the current Commonwealth President of the Society. It is based in the Midlands town of Worcester, Worcestershire.

The RLSS is part of Royal Lifesaving Society Commonwealth, and the International Life Saving Federation.

== Lifesaving in the United Kingdom and Ireland ==
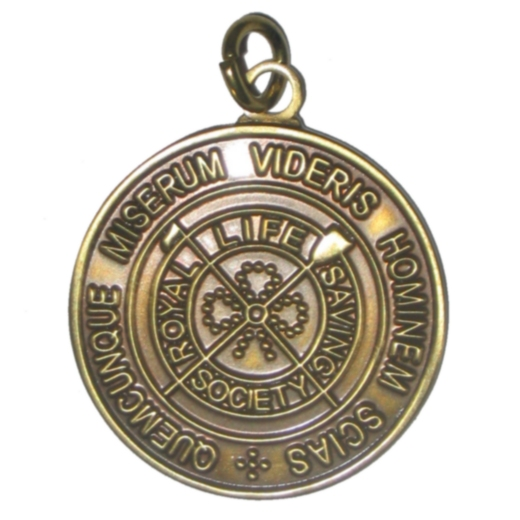
The RLSS Bronze Medallion

Lifesaving and lifeguarding are promoted as a sport and a life skill by the Royal Life Saving Society UK. There are over 170 lifesaving clubs based throughout the UK and Ireland, which teach skills such as drowning prevention, life support and personal survival. The learning of lifesaving takes place in a variety of water environments, such as swimming pools, inland water venues and at coastal locations. Often clubs coach their members towards achieving RLSS UK awards as part of the Survive & Save Programme. the flagship award being the Bronze Medallion. For a description of the Medallion itself see Bronze Medallion (New Zealand and Australia).

Subsequent awards under the Survive & Save programme follow a path to silver and gold though four disciplines of lifesaving, open water, competition, and still water. The final award of lifesaving is that of Distinction, an award that demands a very high level of skill. The Distinction is awarded on passing three 3 gold awards. Training programmes exist for all ages, from young children to adults. Some lifesaving and lifeguard clubs operate as volunteer organisations, providing safety cover at locations where there would otherwise be none.

The RLSS organises both national and regional speed and skills competitions and many clubs, including university affiliated clubs (organised through the British Universities Lifesaving Clubs Association (BULSCA)) field teams at these events.

== Lifesaving in the Commonwealth countries ==
RLSS is a family of lifesaving organisations, active in 27 Commonwealth countries with a common heritage of drowning prevention activities including delivery of water safety education, water rescue and resuscitation training.

== Courses and qualifications ==
=== Professional certification ===
The RLSS offers community courses as well as vocational qualifications for pool and beach lifeguards. These vocational awards are recognised throughout the UK and Ireland and are awarded under the auspices of the Institute of Qualified Lifeguards. These awards include the National Pool and National Beach Lifeguard Qualifications (NPLQ and NBLQ respectively) as well as the new National Pool Management Course (NPMQ).

=== Children's Life Saving ===
RLSS UK offers various courses for young people including the Rookie Lifeguard Programme which is part of the governments National Plan for Teaching of Swimming developed to teach children aged 8 to 12 years old the basics in life saving. Other programmes include Young Leaders (12+), Assistant Instructor (14+) and Rookie Instructor (16+) as well as Assistant Beach Lifeguard and Senior Lifesaving Awards. Young people also have the opportunity to use their lifesaving skills in a competitive environment through the Sport Section of the Society.

=== Lifesaving Life Support ===
Lifesaving Life Support refers to the series of exams implemented by the RLSS in order to assess a lifesaver's ability in on land rescue techniques.

== See also ==
- Lifesaving
- Royal Life Saving Society Australia
- Royal Life Saving Society of Canada
- Lifesaving Awards
