= Swimming lessons =

Teaching swimming

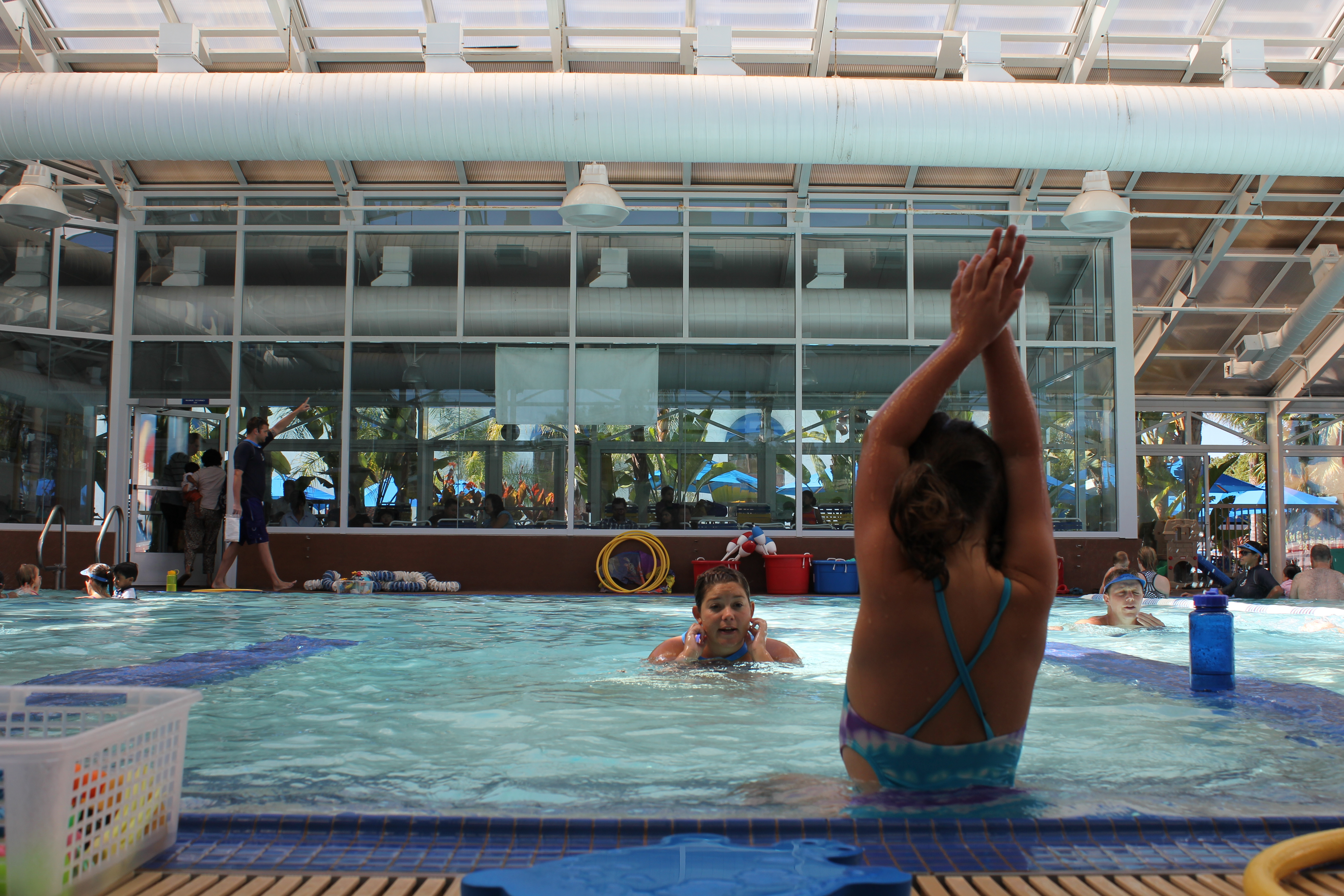
A five-year-old girl learns arm placement from her teacher in an individual class at a dedicated swimming school in San Jose, California. Other children learn in small group classes (far left and right).

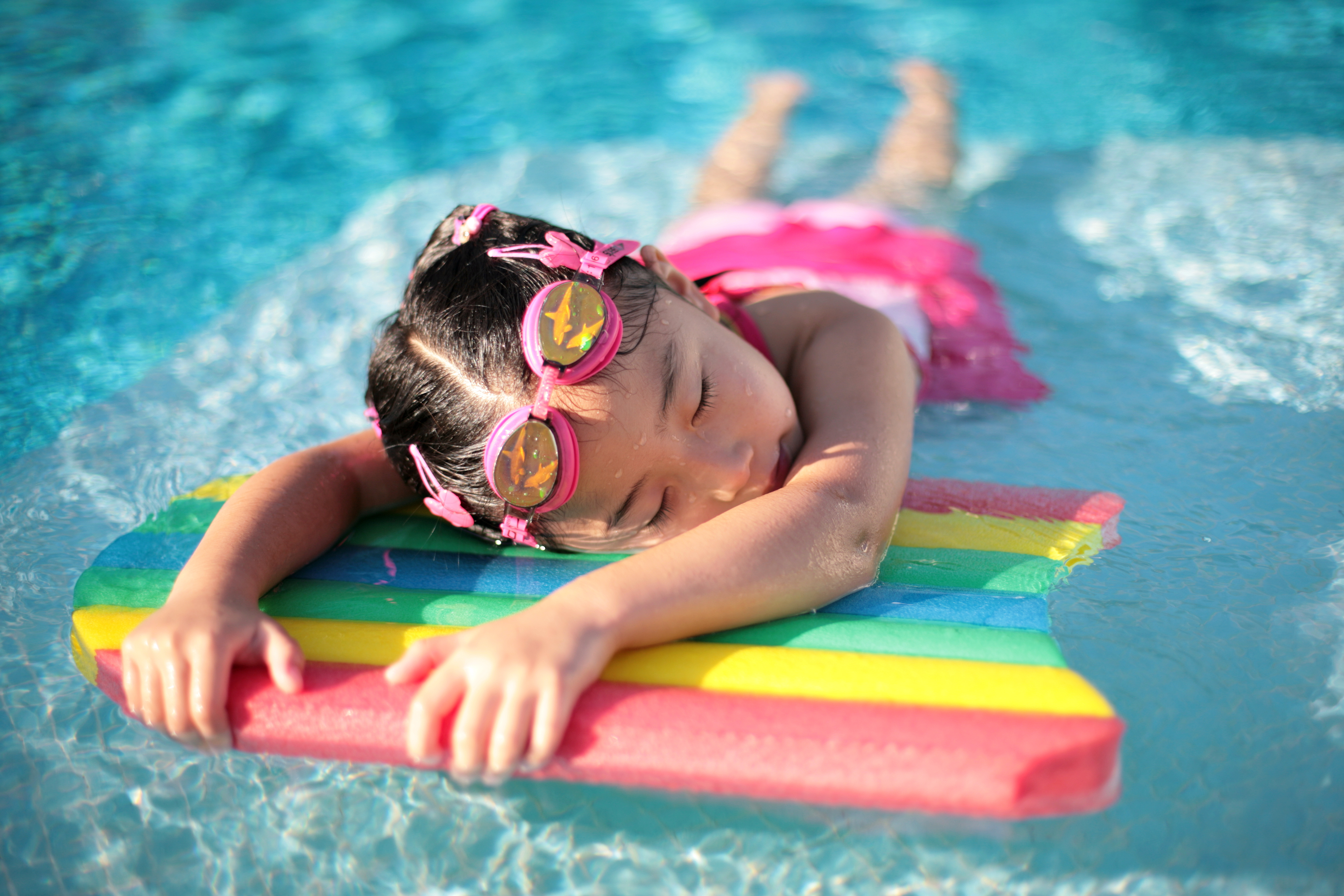
A Styrofoam flotation aid (AKA a kick-board) can help children learn to swim.

Swimming lessons are the process of learning to swim. In most countries there is a definition of a number of swimming levels that are reached in the process of the curriculum. The respective certificates of swimming tests are required for further training in aquatic abilities. Many countries have defined a minimum swimming level that children should reach by the end of primary education, in most cases with the help of school swimming classes being part of the normal curriculum.

Children are often given swimming lessons, which serve to develop swimming technique and confidence. Children were traditionally viewed not to be able to swim independently until 4 years of age, but infant swimming lessons are now recommended to prevent drowning and increase water familiarity. There are many different ways of learning to swim with swimming lessons. There are community center lessons, semi-private lessons and private lessons. Swimming lessons can support children with special needs through adaptive swimming lessons.

== Infant swimming lessons ==
The Centers for Disease Control and Prevention (CDC) recommends swimming lessons for children from 1–4, along with other precautionary measures to prevent drowning. In 2010, the American Academy of Pediatrics reversed its previous position in which it had disapproved of lessons before age 4, indicating that the evidence no longer supported an advisory against early swimming lessons.

There is an essential difference between the new infant swimming lessons and the traditional parent-child water play sessions. Infant swimming lessons, sometimes called infant swim recovery, teach infants and toddlers how to recover from an accidental fall into a body of water. Unlike traditional parent/toddler classes, which encourage the child's face in the water through blowing bubbles, infant swimming lessons instill in the child the skills to regain buoyancy from a submerged state and to tilt the head back, getting it out of the water to take breaths and cry for help. Children ages one to six-years-old learn advanced safety skills to roll to their backs to take a breath and then to roll back to their stomachs to continue swimming.

Swimming lessons reduce the risk of drowning by 88% for babies and children up to 4 years old.

== School swimming ==
In many locations, swimming lessons are provided by local swimming pools, both those run by the local authority and by private leisure companies. Many schools also include swimming lessons into their physical education (PE) curricula, provided either in the schools' own pools, another school's pool, or in the nearest public pool.

The Department for Education in England includes learning to swim as a compulsory element in primary school PE curriculum. According to the department's website, at the end of year 6 (age 11), all children "should be taught to...swim 25 metres" (front and back) and demonstrate an understanding of water safety. Schools can decide when and where pupils will learn to swim. Many children in the UK learn to swim in lessons that are not provided by their primary school and can swim 25 meters by the age of 6. The National Governing body for Swimming is Swim England who train and accredit 80% of swimming teachers in England and Wales * [Ofqual statistics 2012-17] Advocates for school swimming lessons in the United States frequently cite the CDC estimate that 34% of American adults are unable to swim 24 yards.

In Sweden, Denmark, Norway, and Finland, the curriculum for 11-year-olds in the fifth grade states that all children should learn how to swim as well as how to handle emergencies near water. Most commonly, children are expected to be able to swim 200 metres (220 yards)—of which at least 50 metres (55 yards) is on their back—after first falling into deep water and submerging their head underwater. Even though about 95 percent of Swedish schoolchildren know how to swim, drowning remains the third-most common cause of death among children.

In both the Netherlands and Belgium, swimming lessons during school time (schoolzwemmen, or school swimming) are supported by the government. Most schools provide swimming lessons. There is a long tradition of swimming lessons in the Netherlands and in Belgium; the Dutch translation for the breaststroke swimming style is schoolslag (schoolstroke). The children learn a variant of the breaststroke. In recent years however, most Dutch towns have abolished school swimming in order to cut expenses.

In Germany and Austria, school swimming (Schulschwimmen) is part of the elementary school curriculum leading to the entry level certificate (Frühschwimmer) for about 90 percent of the children (a 95% goal set by the ministers for education with actual percentages ranging as low as 75% in some schools). About 50 percent reach a higher swimming level certificate during school swimming. In Switzerland most schools offer a swimming course, though only 70% of the students take part in it, which has led to the Schulschwimmen für alle petition in 2007. Unlike in Germany and Austria, the Swiss school swimming test commonly includes a jump from the diving tower.

In France, school swimming (natation scolaire) is part of the curriculum for physical education in the second and third grade in elementary school, or for children aged between 4 and 6 years of age. The aim is successful completion of entry into water then swimming for 50 metres (55 yards), before floating for 10 seconds, then swimming on the front and on the back for 10 metres (11 yards) each, ending with retrieval of an object from deep water of more than 2 metres (6.6 feet).

In England, the "Top-ups scheme" calls for those schoolchildren who cannot swim by the age of 11 to receive intensive daily lessons. These children who have not reached the National Curriculum standard of swimming 25 metres (27 yards) by the time they leave primary school will be given a half-hour lesson every day for two weeks during term-time.

In Canada and Mexico there has been a call for swimming to be included in the public school curriculum, which has been implemented slowly in a few schools.

In Singapore, most swimming schools teach the SwimSafer Programme introduced by Singapore National Water Safety Council in July 2010 with support from the Singapore Sports Council. The SwimSafer Programme combines instruction in swimming and life-saving skills.

== Swimming levels ==
An indian stuntman swimming without moving body parts as part of Stunt.

=== Austria ===
The Arbeitsgemeinschaft Österreichisches Wasserrettungswesen (working committee for water rescue in Austria) is a joint committee of private organizations and government bodies. They have defined four grade levels of swimming lessons used in school swimming.

- Entry level Frühschwimmer (early swimmer—badge showing a penguin) requires jump from side, 25 metres (27 yards) of swimming and 5 rules of swimming.
- Level 1 Freischwimmer (free swimmer—badge with one wave and a bronze pin) requires 15 minutes of swimming (any style), 1-metre (3.3-foot) jump into water, and 10 rules of swimming.
- Level 2 Fahrtenschwimmer (trail swimmer—badge with two waves and a silver pin) requires 15 minutes of swimming, dive jump or jump from 3-metre (10-foot) height, 10 metres (11 yards) of swimming underwater, pickup of a thick object from deep water (2 m [6.6 ft] water, 2.5 kg [5.5 lb] weight), 50 metres (55 yards) of back crawl, and 10 rules of swimming.
- Level 3 Allroundschwimmer (routine swimmer—badge with one wave and gold pin) requires 200 metres (220 yards) of continuous swimming (100 metres front crawl and 100 metres back crawl), sport swimming of 100 meters under 2 minutes 30 seconds, 10 metres (11 yards) of swimming underwater after dive jump, pickup of a thick object from deep water (2 m [6.6 ft] water, 2.5 kg [5.5 lb] weight), 50 metres (55 yards) of back crawl, 20 metres (22 yards) of rescue swimming with a person of about the same weight, and 10 rules of swimming.

Additionally, the ÖWR water rescue organization's testing requirements for the Jugendschwimmerschein (youth swimmer certificate) includes 50 metres of breast stroke under 1 minute 5 seconds, 50 metres front crawl under 1 minute, 50 metres back crawl under 1 minute 19 seconds, description of lifeguard rules, 50 metres of rescue swimming with another similar-weight person, 100-metre snorkel under 1 minute 50 seconds, and 100 metres of swimming while clothed.

=== Canada ===
In Canada, the Canadian Red Cross Swim program is used, with over one million Canadians enrolling each year. Similar to the system set out by the American Red Cross, the Swim Kids program for school-aged children consists of ten levels that progress from basic confidence-building skills to more complicated strokes and techniques. In beginner levels, students learn breathing techniques, basic water safety skills, and introductory swimming techniques including how to float and glide in the water at shallow depths. At intermediate levels, students are taught six swim strokes including front crawl, sculling, back crawl, breast stroke, elementary back stroke, and sidestroke. Advanced levels of the program teach students to use these techniques to swim in deeper water and remain safe while swimming. Upon successful completion of the ten levels of the program, students are eligible to enter the Bronze Medal programs (Bronze Star, Bronze Medallion, and Bronze Cross) to learn lifesaving skills. After completing all three Bronze Medal program courses, students can further advance with additional programs such as Water Safety Instructor (WSI) that teach them how to become swimming instructors themselves. Additional programs following the same structure at a faster pace are also available for teenagers and adults who wish to learn how to swim safely and build confidence in the water.

Additionally, 800,000 Canadians participate annually in Lifesaving Society (LSS) swimming, lifesaving, lifeguard, first aid, and leadership training programs. Each year LSS certifies thousands of instructors who provide the leadership for those training programs. As Canada's leading lifeguarding experts, LSS sets the standard for professional lifeguard training and certify Canada's National Lifeguards.

=== Germany ===
The Schwimmabzeichen (swimming badge) is assigned in four levels: Entry, Bronze, Silver, and Gold. The levels are defined by the Bundesverband zur Förderung der Schwimmausbildung (federal association for promotion of swimming lessons—assembling NGO associations) in coordination with the federal Kultusministerkonferenz (assembly of the ministers for education of each Bundesland-state).

The entry level Frühschwimmer (early swimmer) includes a swimming test where the student shows a jump from side, a 25-metre swim (no style prescribed), and pickup of an object underwater. The Frühschwimmer level is better known by its mascot Seepferdchen (seahorse) shown on the badge, leading many to refer to it as the Seepferdchen certificate.

The bronze badge requires 200 metres of swimming in under 15 minutes (no style prescribed).

The silver badge requires 400 metres of swimming in under 12 minutes, pickup of an object from deep water (more than 2 metres), jump and dive from the side, and 10 metres of swimming underwater.

The gold badge requires 1,000 metres of swimming (under 24 minutes for males and under 29 minutes for females), sport swimming of 100 meters (under 1:50 for males and 2:00 for females), 100 metres of back crawl, 50 metres of rescue swimming, 15 metres of swimming underwater, pickup of three objects from deep water (2 metres minimum, under 3 minutes, maximum 3 attempts).

Lifeguard certificates are defined separately by each organization; the entry level is Junior-Retter (junior rescuer) at the DLRG (the largest aquatics life saving organization in the world) and Juniorwasserretter (junior water rescuer) at the Wasserwacht (water rescue branch of the German Red Cross). Extended Lifeguard certificate grades can be obtained at three levels of the Rettungsschwimmabzeichen (rescue swimming badge) in bronze, silver, and gold.

=== Netherlands ===
The Dutch National Swimming diploma is issued by the National council for swim safety. The national swimming diploma exist of the Swim-ABC and separate swimming skill diplomas. The National Council for swim safety advises children to get the full Swim-ABC program. This three-stage program will teach children the basic skills of swimming. When a child understands and masters the fundamentals of the basic swimming skills, they will earn a diploma. The Swim-ABC program consists of three separate diploma's. After getting all diploma's you officially meet the standards of the National norm of swim safety.

- A diploma

This is the first stage of the three-stage Swim-ABC and teaches the following basic swimming skills: swimming a short distance while performing breaststroke, single backstroke, front crawl or back crawl while fully clothed. Getting out of the water while fully clothed. Swimming under water and swimming through or around an obstacle. Master the four basic swimming strokes: breaststroke, single backstroke, front crawl and back crawl for a short distance. Tread water using arms and legs.

- B diploma

The second stage of the Swim-ABC focuses on having a good condition and teaches children to safely orientate both underwater and above water. This stage consists of mastering the following swimming skills: swimming a distance while performing breaststroke, single backstroke, front crawl or back crawl while fully clothed over a longer distance. Performing a dive in the water and swimming around or through an obstacle. Master the four basic swimming strokes: breaststroke, single backstroke, front crawl and back crawl over a longer distance. Swimming towards an obstacle and climb on it to rest. Tread water using arms and legs.

- C diploma

The last stage of the Swim-ABC focuses on having a great condition and teaches children to safely orientate both underwater and above water in swimming pools and open water. The last stage consists of mastering the following swimming skills: swimming a long distance while performing breaststroke, single backstroke, front crawl or back crawl while fully clothed. Performing a dive in the water and swimming through an obstacle and find a safe place to get above water. Master the four basic swimming strokes over a long distance: breaststroke, single backstroke, front crawl and back crawl. Swimming towards an obstacle and climb on it to rest. Tread water using arms and legs.

=== Singapore ===
SwimSafer was introduced in July 2010 by the National Water Safety Council (NWSC), a council appointed by then the Ministry of Community, Youth and Sports (MCYS).

SwimSafer was enhanced in 2018 to better equip participants with more rigorous water survival and swimming competency skills. The enhanced SwimSafer 2.0 programme comes with a revised learning syllabus and assessment criteria. Instructors were also put through enhanced training and re-certification. SwimSafer 2.0 is the National Water Safety Programme designed to emphasize the importance of safety around aquatic environments.

The programme aims to teach swimming proficiency and water survival skills in a fun manner. There are 6 progressive levels. Upon successful completion of each stage, an e-certificate will be issued to each participant.

- SwimSafer stage 1: introduction to water skills

Stage 1 teaches children to become more confident and independent in the water. A child also learns about general water safety, how to properly enter and exit a pool, and how to move back and forth in the water.

- SwimSafer stage 2: fundamental water skills

Stage 2 involves learning how to handle surface dives, sculling, water safety, and awareness in the water. It also involves learning how to enter the water without assistance. A primary objective of stage 2 is to enable children to successfully swim twenty-five metres.

- SwimSafer stage 3: personal water survival and stroke developmental skills

Children in stage 3 learn how to survive in the water and handle different rescue skills. Additional skills covered are sculling, underwater swimming and learning how to use a flotation device. The goal of this stage is to enable children to successfully swim fifty metres.

- SwimSafer Bronze: personal water survival and stroke improvement skills

This is the first advanced stage of the program. Here children learn stroke movements and coordinated breathing, and are encouraged to swim as far as one hundred metres. They will also learn how to safely handle watercraft while continuing to learn additional rescue and survival skills.

- SwimSafer Silver: intermediate personal water survival and stroke refinement skills

Diving is introduced in this stage, along with advanced survival and rescue skills. Advanced swimming strokes will also be taught at this point in the program.

- SwimSafer Gold: advanced personal water survival and swimming skills proficiency

This is the final stage of the program. To successfully complete this stage, a student is required to swim four hundred metres. Standing dive and survival skills are taught here along with advanced lifesaving processes and water safety.

=== Switzerland ===
In Switzerland the Schwimmtests (swimming tests) are not organized in levels; instead each ability is tested by itself and a number of test certificates are put in a group designation. The swimming tests are defined by "swimsports.ch", which is an association of swimming NGOs and the federal institute for sports (BASPO).

The Entry level has six tests: Ente (duck), Schwan (swan), Seehund (sea lion), Nilpferd (hippo), Schildkröte (turtle), and Biber (beaver).

The Basic level has seven tests: Krebs (crab), Seepferd (seahorse), Frosch (frog), Pinguin (penguin), Tintenfisch (cuttlefish), Krokodil (crocodile), and Eisbär (polar bear).

The Advanced level has eight tests: Wal (whale), Hecht (pike), Hai (shark), Delfin (dolphin), and four additional tests with no symbols assigned.

=== United Kingdom ===
Scotland

In Scotland swimming lessons are undertaken by pupils at an age 8 or 9 when the child is in Primary 5. These lessons take place during the school day. The Scottish Amateur Swimming Association – known as Scottish Swimming – has called for all young children to be entitled to free swimming lessons as they have been in England and Wales since the 1990s. Swimming lessons in Scotland have come under criticism because of the long waiting lists where in some counties there is a waiting list of up to 2000 children, or 1040 days. This has led to an increase of private swimming schools start up which are able to use private pools (as opposed to council run lessons only using council pools).

Lessons in Scotland generally follow two main award schemes, the STA (Swimming Teachers' Association) or Swim England (SE) award schemes. The council lessons tend to follow the SE Scheme whilst private swimming lessons use either of them. There have been a number of high-profile cases of private swimming lessons changing from SE to STA. Recognised by employers for their quality, Swim England consistently remain the preferred choice of over 80% of swimming teachers in England and Wales* [Ofqual statistics 2012-17] The STA also teaches about life-saving techniques in their lessons which the ASA offer as a separate course in conjunction with the Royal Life Saving Society. In England, all schools must provide swimming instruction either in key stage 1 or key stage 2. In particular, pupils should be taught to: swim competently, confidently and proficiently over a distance of at least 25 metres use a range of strokes effectively [for example, front crawl, backstroke and breaststroke] perform safe self-rescue in different water-based situations. There is no provision for this in the Curriculum for Excellence in Scotland.

=== United States ===
In the United States, most swimming schools use the swimming levels "Learn To Swim" as defined by the American Red Cross.

- Level 1: Introduction to Water Skills

The student needs to get comfortable with water: this includes kicking, bobbing, underwater exploration, front and back floating and gliding with face in the water, open eyes under water. Children learning these basic skills often will use Styrofoam kick-boards, inflatable arm-floats and other aquatic equipment to help stay afloat.

- Level 2: Fundamental Aquatic Skills

The student needs to swim 15 feet on front and back, submerge entire head, submerge and retrieve an object. At this level, swimmers will work to swim without any equipment except an object to retrieve underwater.

- Level 3: Stroke Development Skills

The student needs to swim 15 yards on front, back and crawl, also jump into deep water from side. Swimmers are expected to perform these skills independently of any aquatic equipment that may assist them in staying afloat.

- Level 4: Stroke Improvement

Includes front and back crawl of 25 yards, butterfly and breaststroke of 15 yards, allowing for turns while swimming.

- Level 5: Stroke Refinement

All strokes should be shown at 25 yards, allow for flip turn, includes swimming underwater for 15 yards.

- Level 6: Skill Proficiency

The swimming test includes swimming continuously of 500 yards, including back and front crawl at 100 yards, plus 50 yards for each of butterfly, backstroke, breaststroke and sidestroke. On top of this common swimming proficiency there are three swimming test variants for the Level 6 certificate: (A) Fundamentals of Diving – show a jump from the diving board; (B) Fitness Swimmer – demonstrate the use of training gear; (C) Personal Water Safety – life jacket and boating rules.

Lifeguard certificates are obtained directly in courses of the American Red Cross. The course length varies with 30 to 37 hours with an option for blended learning for the five certificates of Pool Lifeguarding, Waterfront Lifeguarding, Waterpark Lifeguarding, Aquatic Attractions Lifeguarding and Shallow Water Lifeguarding.
