= YMCA Camp Wanakita =

YMCA camp in Canada

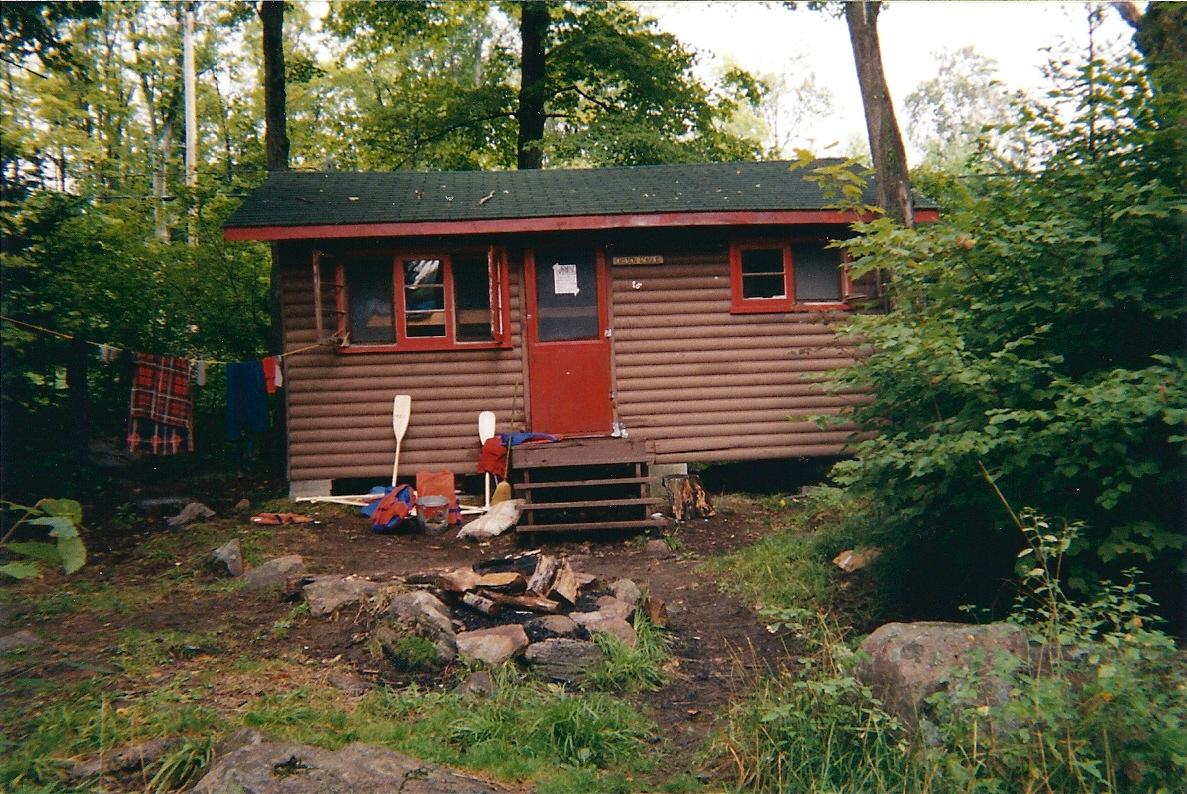
- The "Golden Eagle" cabin on the West side. Most of Wanakita's cabins are named after animals.
- Interactive map of YMCA Camp Wanakita
- Location: Haliburton County, Canada
- Coordinates: 44.979°N 78.487°W
- Established: 1953
- Operator: YMCA of Hamilton, Burlington and Brantford
- Website: wanakita.ymcahbb.ca

YMCA Wanakita is a camp located on Koshlong Lake near Haliburton in central Ontario, Canada. It is run by the YMCA of Hamilton, Burlington and Brantford and attracts campers from throughout Ontario and sometimes internationally. The name "Wanakita" comes from a legend of the Wendat people.

Wanakita is most active as a residential summer camp, however it also offers winter camping and family camping. As of 2012, the camp estimates that it has been home to over 200,000 individuals since it was founded in 1953.

== History ==
Camp Wanakita was designed as a replacement for Erie Heights on Lake Erie which was itself a replacement for Camp Tekahoinwake on the Grand River. Both of these locations were considered too developed so George Jones and co-workers from the YMCA chose Koshlong Lake as the site for Wanakita in 1953. The name "Wanakita" was chosen by Keith Smith. Wanakita began as an all-boys camp and during its early years, the nurse was the only woman who was regularly on the camp grounds. In 1969, the camp started offering the same opportunities to girls. Since 1991, Wanakita has partnered with Hemophilia Ontario and offered instruction on the proper use of clotting agents.

Wanakita originally owned 30 acres of land but has grown to a size of over 1,000 acres. Its largest expansion came from a private donation by a landowner who felt that the camp was a positive presence on Koshlong Lake. For its 50th anniversary in 2003, the camp spent $3 million on landscaping and building additional cabins. This construction provided washrooms to many of the cabin areas that were previously only serviced by kybos. This restructuring allowed Wanakita to run its family camp program all summer long which had previously only been run for one week every summer. Instead of dividing summer campers between the West and East sides, the directors started assigning all summer campers to cabins in the expanded West side, leaving the East side available for families. This decision was controversial among the core audience of residential campers.

One of the staff members most involved with the growth of the camp is Steve Heming whose first experience with the camp came in 1964 at age 10. He continued to return to Wanakita, first as a camper and later as a counsellor and became the general manager during the 1980s. Heming retired in 2010 and passed on his position to Andy Gruppe. In 2011, the camp was given an "Enviro-Hero" award by the Haliburton Highlands Land Trust.

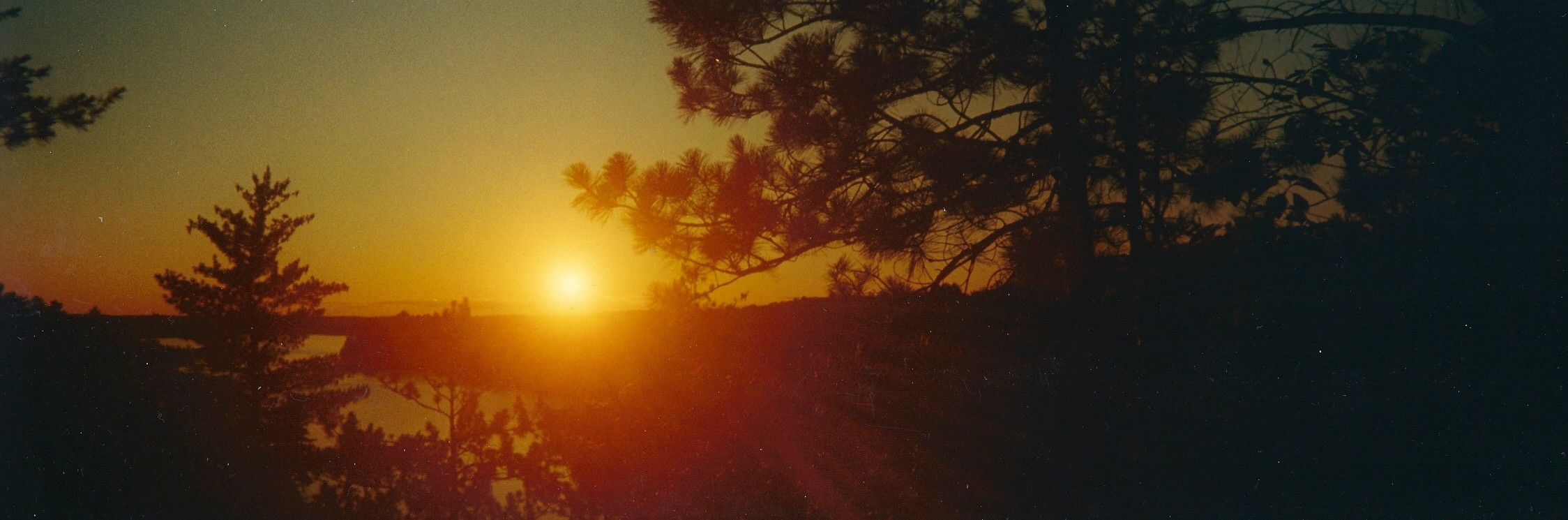
A sunset on Koshlong Lake, viewed from one of the campsites used by YMCA Wanakita campers during overnight canoe trips.

The camp has also been featured in teen series like Camp Rock (2008) and Camp Rock 2 (2010), on Disney Channel, where it followed the life of pop stars and other campers during music summer camp.

== Summer activities ==
Campers attending YMCA Wanakita are grouped into cabins. Each cabin has approximately 10 campers from the same age division and 2 counsellors. Letters and emails from parents are periodically delivered and the staff member responsible spends half of each day printing about 250 messages. The cabin stays together during all parts of camp except Personal Choice Activities (PCAs).

Division	Age range	Overnight trip	Number of PCAs	Minimum session
Day camp	7-14	None	0	One week
Junior	7-9	1 night per week of camp stay	2 per week of camp stay	One week
Intermediate	10-12	1 night per week of camp stay	2 per week of camp stay	One week
Senior Specialty	13-16	2 nights	4	Two weeks
Senior Traditional	13-16	5 nights, off site	2	Two weeks
Senior Tripper	13-16	7 nights, off site	0	Two weeks
Student Counsellor	15+	Various trips including a 5 night trip	0	One month

All cabins nearly always house one gender. Historically the Senior program at Wanakita involved a canoe trip lasting 5 days and 4 nights. Two alternative Senior programs have since emerged — one of them scales back the overnight trip, the other has the trip as the primary focus. The off site trips are held in wilderness areas that have several lakes and may involve a significant amount of portaging. Current destinations are Algonquin Provincial Park and Magnetawan River. Student Counsellors also have the option to go on an off site trip, which is currently located around Lake Temagami

In order to be a counsellor at Wanakita, one must normally be a Student Counsellor (SC) for two years. To be hired, counsellors must take First Aid and CPR courses and achieve the Bronze Cross. Other positions such as senior counsellors and lifeguards require the full NLS.

=== Traditions ===
YMCA Wanakita encourages returning campers to bond with the newcomers and share their experiences. A welcome centre (“Hemming Welcome Centre”, previously the “Longhouse”) near the camp's entrance maintains a board with the name of every camper who has ever attended. At the beginning of each session, the general manager reads "The YMCA Wanakita Charter". At the end of the session, it is read again to help campers decide whether they lived up to it. When this is done, the YMCA triangle symbol is set on fire.

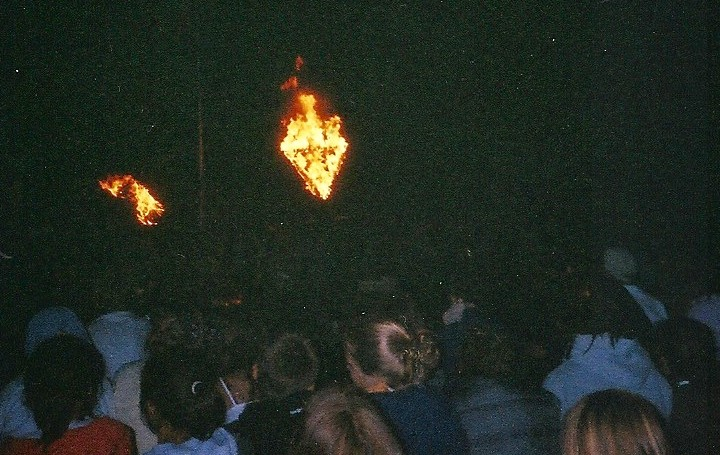
Campers hearing the challenge under the flaming triangle at a closing campfire.

We who have been before challenge you, who are the present, to make new friends, renew old friendships, experience new skills, discover and appreciate nature and the outdoor life, to participate fully in all activities that are offered to you, and to create memories that last a lifetime.

You are challenged to learn that YMCA Wanakita is not just the buildings, the land and the lake, but the people. It is the people that become so much a part of us while we are here.

Finally, we challenge you to keep your sense of fun and adventure, that no matter what your age, to be healthy in spirit, mind and body, and to make YMCA Wanakita what it really is... A place to have the time of your life!

—The YMCA Wanakita Charter.

=== Meals ===
Breakfast, lunch and dinner are eaten in a building between the East and West sides of the camp known as the core. Each cabin has a permanent table in the core set and cleared by a different pair of campers each day. The cooks make enough meals for people to have seconds or thirds if desired. A tuck shop also located in the core sells a limited number of snack items. The camp has started selling the non-edible tuck shop items in an online store. Before each meal, a counselor chooses a religious or secular grace and leads the camp in singing it. Some graces that get used are Jonny Appleseed and The Eidelweiss Grace which are in use by other camps that predate Wanakita. After the meal, cabins begin shouting out cheers.

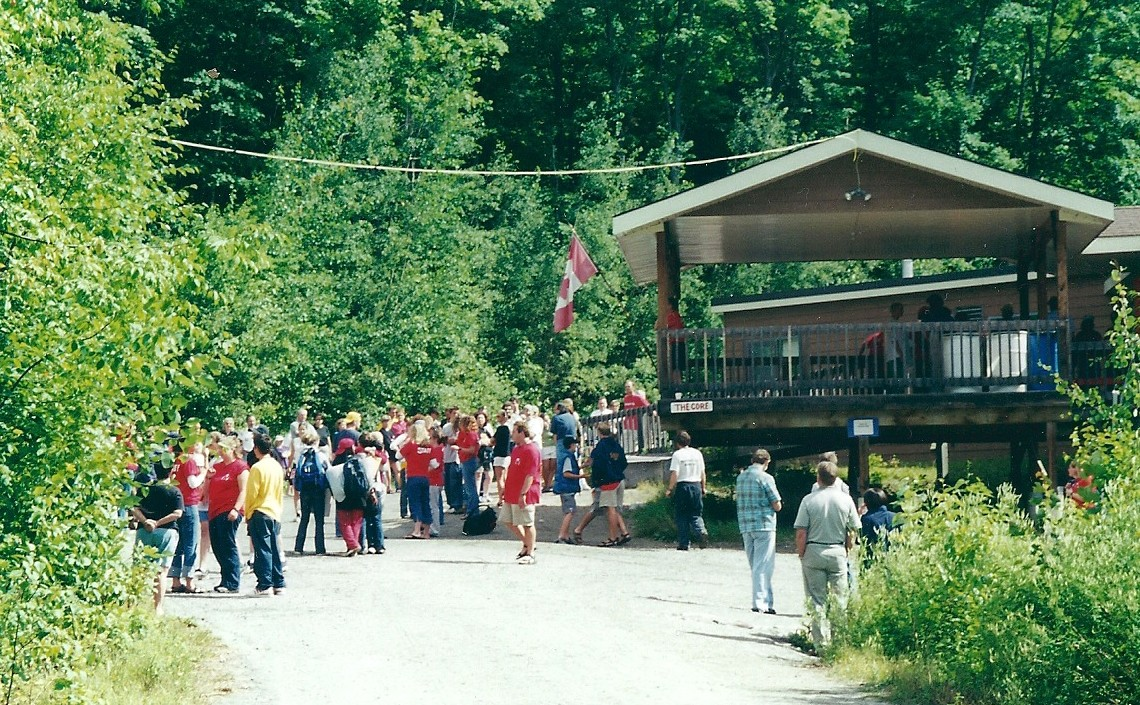
One of the entrances to the core.

We are Juniors,
Mighty, mighty Juniors.
We are Juniors,
And we are the best!

—The Junior cheer, sung to the tune of Alouette.

S-E-N, S-E-N,
S-E-N-I-O-R-S,
The best, we're the Seniors,
S-E-N-I-O-R-S!

—The Senior cheer, sung to the tune of When The Saints Go Marching In.

=== Swimming ===
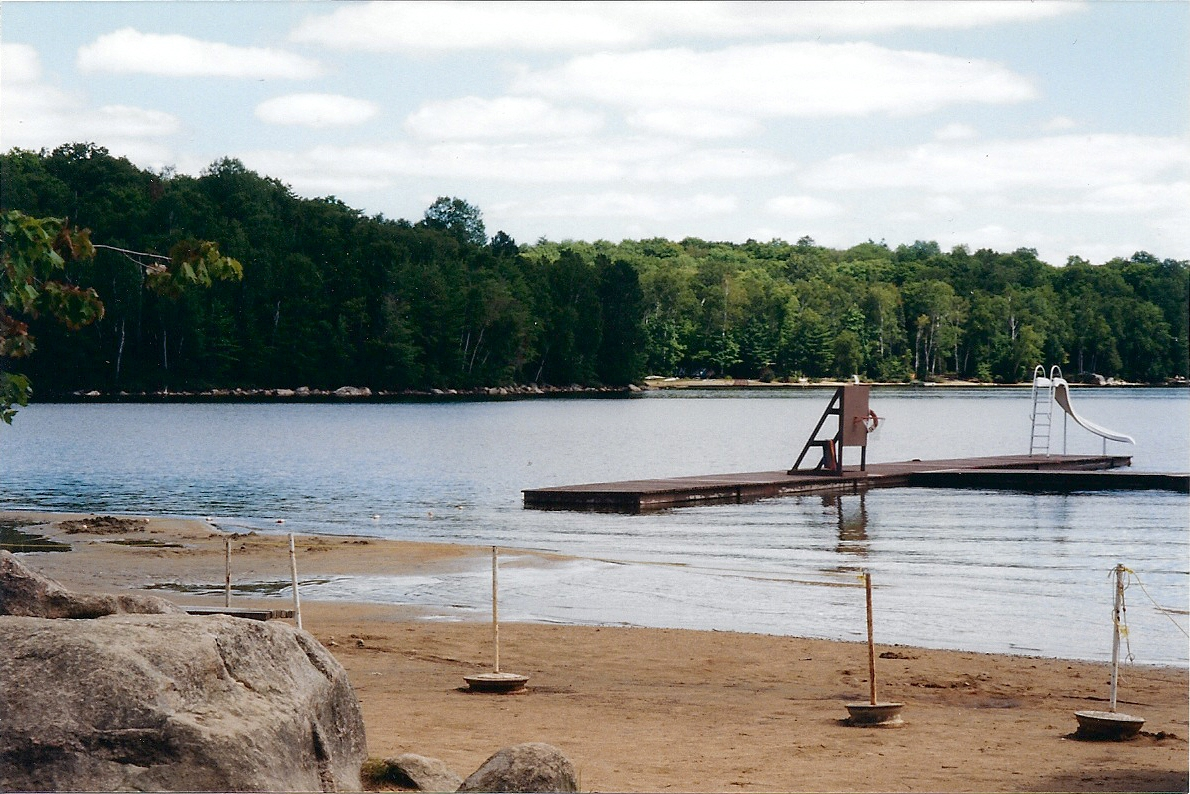
The H-dock floating in Koshlong Lake.

The swimming area has a slide, a basketball net, a water trampoline and an inflatable iceberg. Campers are tested for their swimming ability when they arrive at the camp. Testing is done at a dock that has the shape of an H. The top of the H and the bottom of the H can both be used to swim lengths. At 12.5 metres, the length of the H-dock is around half of the length of a standard pool.

Campers who take the swimming PCA may earn a Bronze Medallion or Bronze Cross if they stay for a month.

=== Boating ===
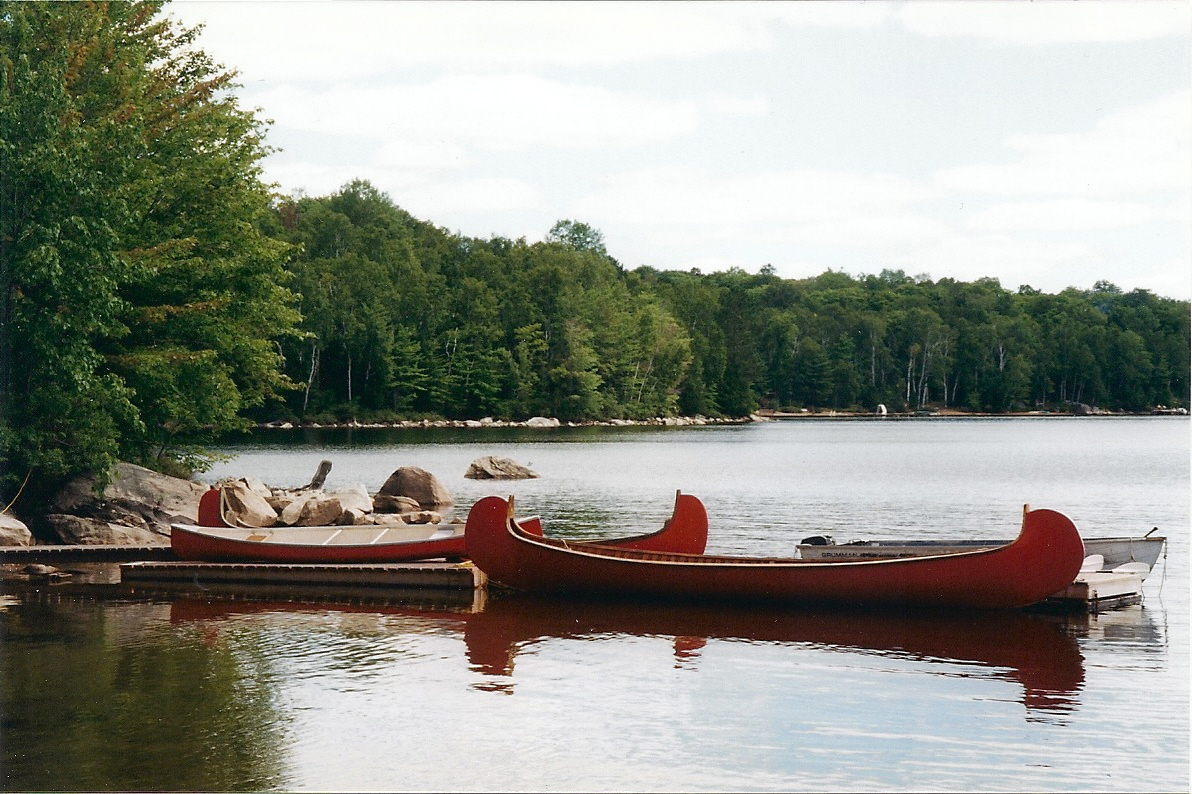
A war canoe and a regular canoe docked at YMCA Wanakita.

A number of boating PCAs are offered with instruction accredited by the Ontario Recreational Canoeing and Kayaking Association. All residential campers are guaranteed to participate in a canoe trip and spend at least one night in a tent away from the camp grounds. For the trips on Koshlong Lake, the counsellor chooses one of ten camp sites that are sufficiently far from cottages and other distractions. Even though Wanakita does not use it for overnight camping, one of the most popular destinations is Jumper's Rock,( or as cottage renters call it Echo Rock where your echo can be heard high atop Jumpers Rock)) a cliff located 6 metres above deep water. Cabins carry out the tripping in standard canoes that hold four people but Wanakita also has two war canoes holding ten.

=== Other ===
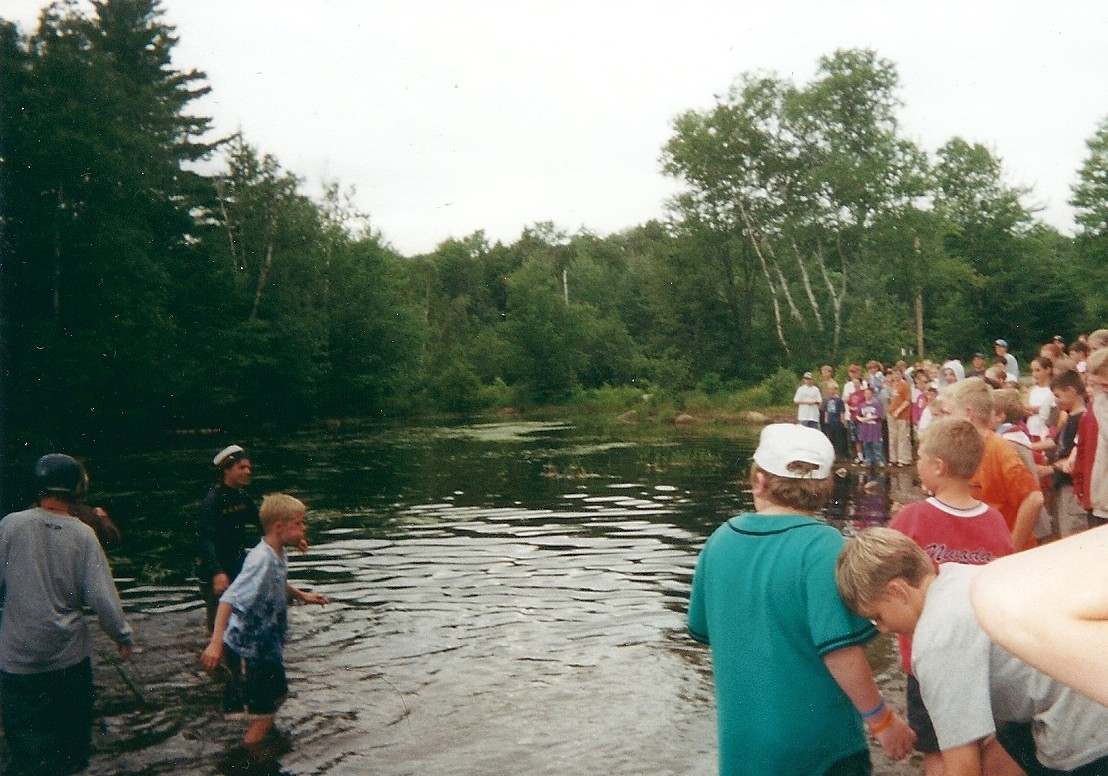
The camp gathers around the west swamp to watch some people swim in it.

Other options in Wanakita's list of activities are mountain biking, court sports, field sports, rock climbing, arts and crafts, paddle making, theatre, wilderness education, acoustic guitar and archery. Morning dip is an optional undertaking that awards a badge to those who run into the lake. Wanakita also has a mob justice system called Kangaroo Court or Kangaroo Kourt (the spelling is not consistent). If a camper or counsellor plays a prank or breaks a minor rule, the incident can be reported to the head of the camp. If it is deemed sufficiently humorous, it will be the subject of a Kangaroo Court case. A harsher sentence is having to swim in the swamp. A meal time rule at Wanakita is "take what you need, but eat what you take". The extent to which this should be enforced is a frequent debate topic in Kangaroo Kourt.
