= WSI =

The acronym WSI may refer to:

- Wafer-scale integration, a technique for building large integrated circuits
- Wall Street Institute, the former name of Wall Street English, an English language education company
- Walter Schottky Institute, a research center at the Technical University of Munich
- Water Safety Instructor, a person qualified to teach swimming lessons
- Weather Services International, a sister company to The Weather Channel, specializing in weather data and software
- Weather Stress Index, a relative measure of weather conditions
- Web Services Interoperability, Organization (WS-I), computer industry consortium
- Western Sydney International Airport – the IATA code of an airport in Sydney
- Western Sydney Institute of TAFE, college institute in New South Wales
- Whole-Slide Image/Imaging, in biology it is a technology to digitally scan and archive whole slides in high resolution
- Winter Soldier Investigation, inquiry into war crimes resulting from United States policies in the Vietnam War
- Wojskowe Służby Informacyjne, Poland's former military intelligence services
- World Security Institute, think-tank for independent research and journalism on global affairs
- World Sindhi Institute, a human rights organization based in Washington, D.C., United States
- Writers and Scholars International, Ltd, the London-based organisation that publishes the Index on Censorship
