= Public Outreach Canada =

Private Fundraising Company Based in Canada

Public Outreach is a private business that provides paid fundraising services to charities in Canada and The United States.

The company was founded in 2002 by James Julien and Gary Kirk. Bryan McKinnon and John Finlay joined a short time later. Gary left P/O in 2006, leaving the three.

Public Outreach fundraises through several mediums including on street, door-to-door, digital, and phone fundraising.

Paid charity canvassing by private companies has proved controversial in some cities where it has led to complaints about aggressive soliciting such as Victoria, British Columbia. Despite the controversial nature of face to face fundraising, Public Outreach co-founder John Finlay said Public Outreach tries to alternate busy intersections, rotating “fallow zones” to “give each community a break from being solicited.” Some fundraising companies have raised controversy by paying solicitors by commission and taking a large share from monthly donations which take many months or a year to reach charities. Public Outreach, however, does not take commissions and pays its employees by the hour, although they are given targets and offered bonuses.

Public Outreach Canada has been hired to raise funds for charities such as Amnesty International and the Canadian Red Cross. Public Outreach Canada has its head offices in Vancouver with a national recruitment centre in Toronto. It fundraises in Victoria, Vancouver, Calgary, Montreal, Quebec City, Toronto, Ottawa, Kitchener and Halifax. A branch in the United States, Public Outreach Fundraising operates in Boston, New York City, San Francisco, Oakland, San Diego, and Los Angeles.
