= Infant swimming =

Reflexive moment in young children

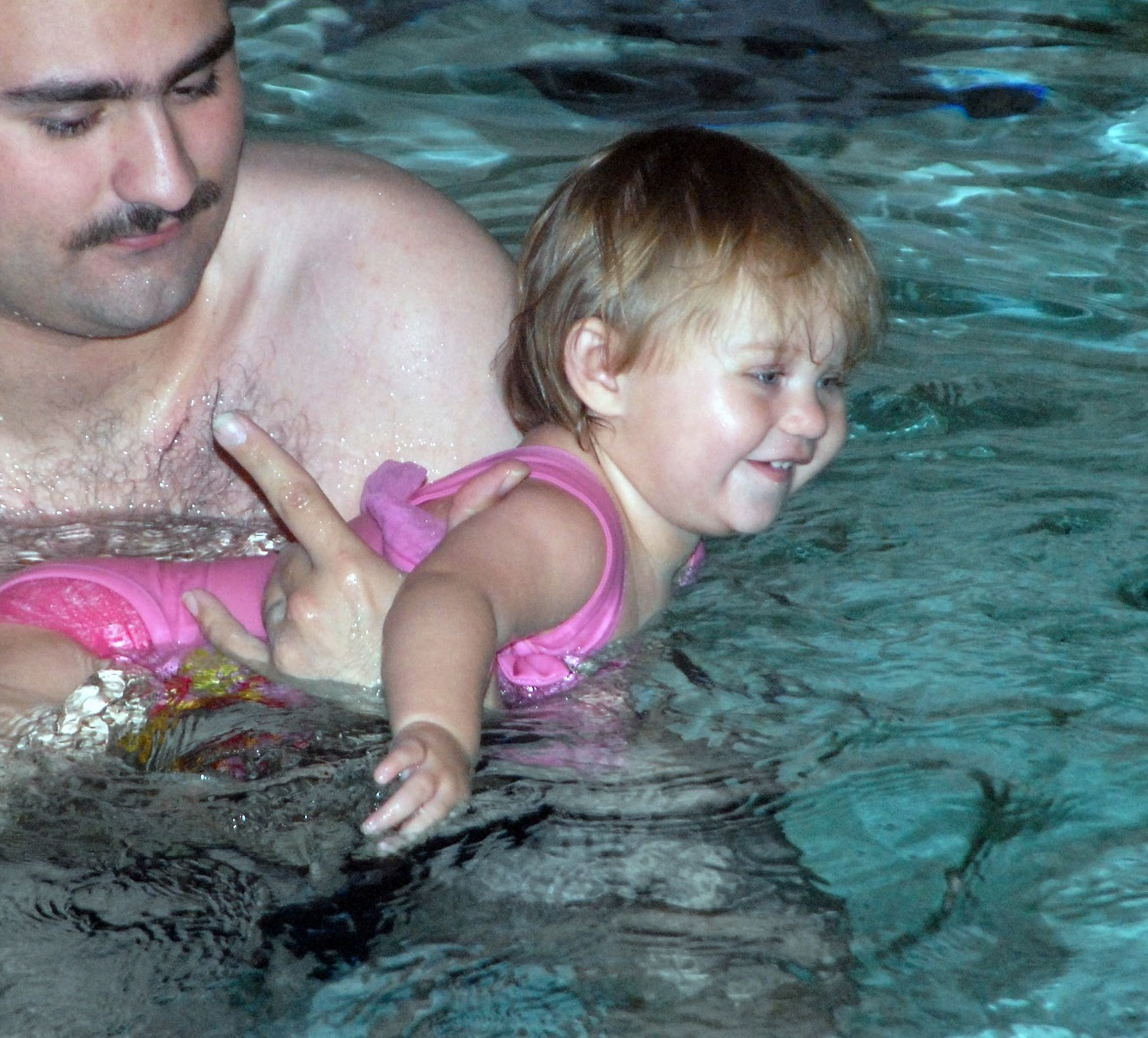
Father with baby getting used to a swimming pool

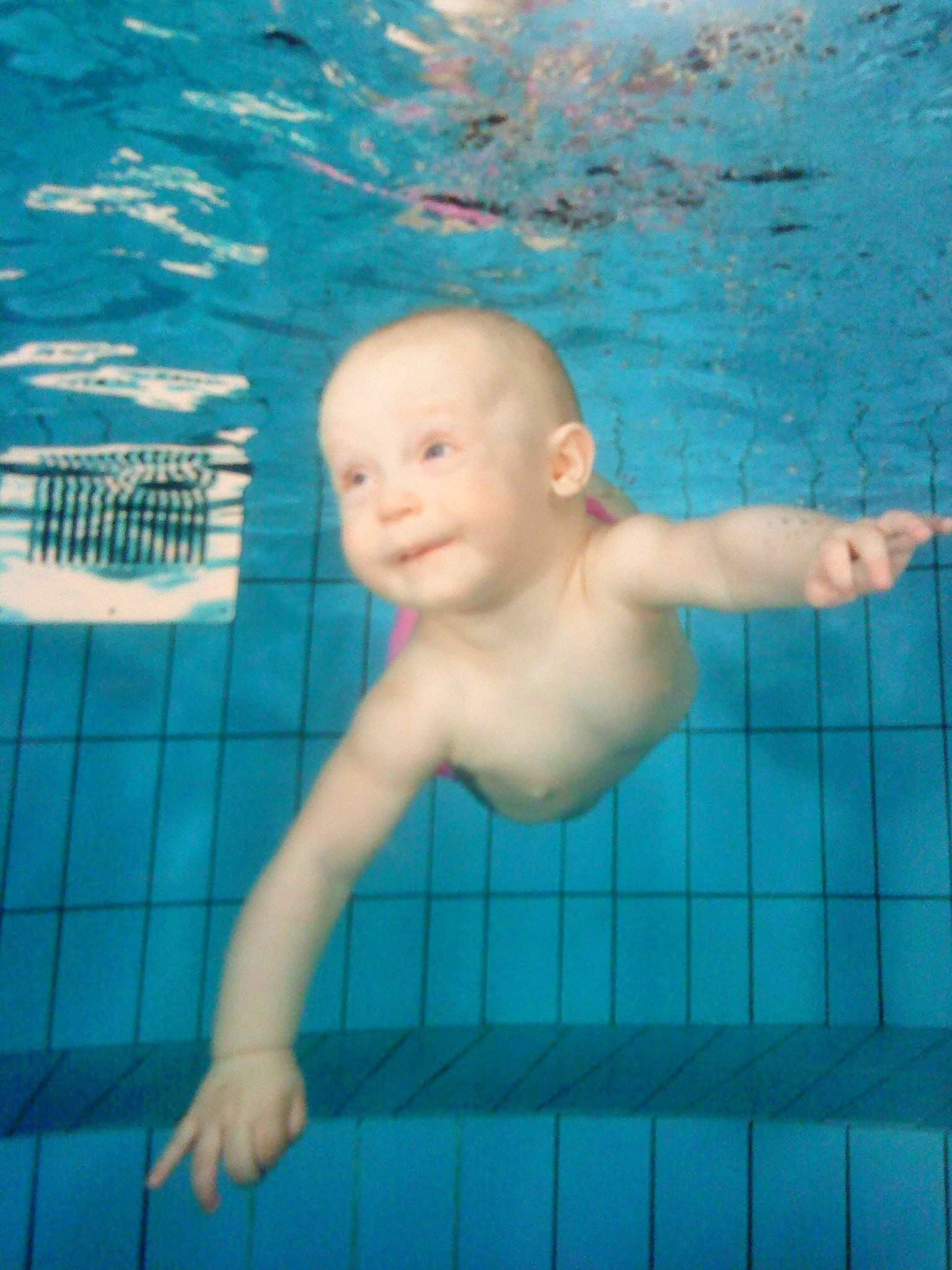
Baby submerged, instinctively holding his breath underwater

Infant swimming is the phenomenon of human babies and toddlers reflexively moving themselves through water and changing their rate of respiration and heart rate in response to being submerged. The slowing of heart rate and breathing is called the bradycardic response. It is not true that babies are born with the ability to swim, though they have primitive reflexes that make it look like they are. Newborns are not old enough to hold their breath intentionally or strong enough to keep their head above water, and cannot swim unassisted.

Most infants, though not all, will reflexively hold their breath when submerged to protect their airway and are able to survive immersion in water for short periods of time. Infants can also be taken to swimming lessons. Although this may be done to reduce their risk of drowning, the effects on drowning risk are not robust. Babies can imitate swimming motions and reflexes, but are not yet physically capable of swimming.

A submersion of the head may last only a few seconds. A German physician pointed out the health risks of infant diving and the sometimes serious consequences as early as 1986, writing that since the introduction of baby swimming in Germany, several hundred infants had died from brain complications as a result of sinusitis and otitis that occurred after diving. Pediatricians also reported cases of cardiac arrest or respiratory failure.

== Infant swimming or diving reflex ==
Most human babies demonstrate an innate swimming or diving reflex from birth until the age of approximately six months, which are part of a wider range of primitive reflexes found in infants and babies, but not children, adolescents and adults. Other mammals also demonstrate this phenomenon (see mammalian diving reflex). This reflex involves apnea (loss of drive to breathe), slowed heart rate (reflex bradycardia), and reduced blood circulation to the extremities such as fingers and toes (peripheral vasoconstriction). During the diving reflex, the infant's heart rate decreases by an average of 20%. The glottis is spontaneously sealed off and the water entering the upper respiratory tract is diverted down the esophagus into the stomach. The diving response has been shown to have an oxygen-conserving effect, both during movement and at rest. Oxygen is saved for the heart and the brain, slowing the onset of serious hypoxic damage. The diving response can therefore be regarded as an important defence mechanism for the body.

== Drowning risk ==
Drowning is a leading cause of unintentional injury and death worldwide, and the highest rates are among children. Overall, drowning is the most common fatal injury among children aged 1–4 years in the USA, and is the second highest cause of death altogether in that age range, after congenital defects.

A Centers for Disease Control and Prevention study in 2012 of United States data from 2005 to 2009 indicated that each year an average of 513 children aged 0–4 years were victims of fatal drowning and a further 3,057 of that age range were treated in U.S. hospital emergency departments for non-fatal drowning. Of all the age groups, children aged 0–4 years had the highest death rate and also non-fatal injury rate. In 2013, among children 1 to 4 years old who died from an unintentional injury, almost 30% died from drowning. These children most commonly drowned in swimming pools, often at their own homes.

A graph showing drowning deaths in the United States from 2018 to 2024 also shows that drowning deaths increase during the summer months. July generally has the highest number of deaths, with approximately deaths across the years shown, while the winter months have much lower numbers. This suggests that drowning prevention and water safety are especially important during the summer, when more people participate in swimming and other water activities.

== Swimming lessons for infants ==
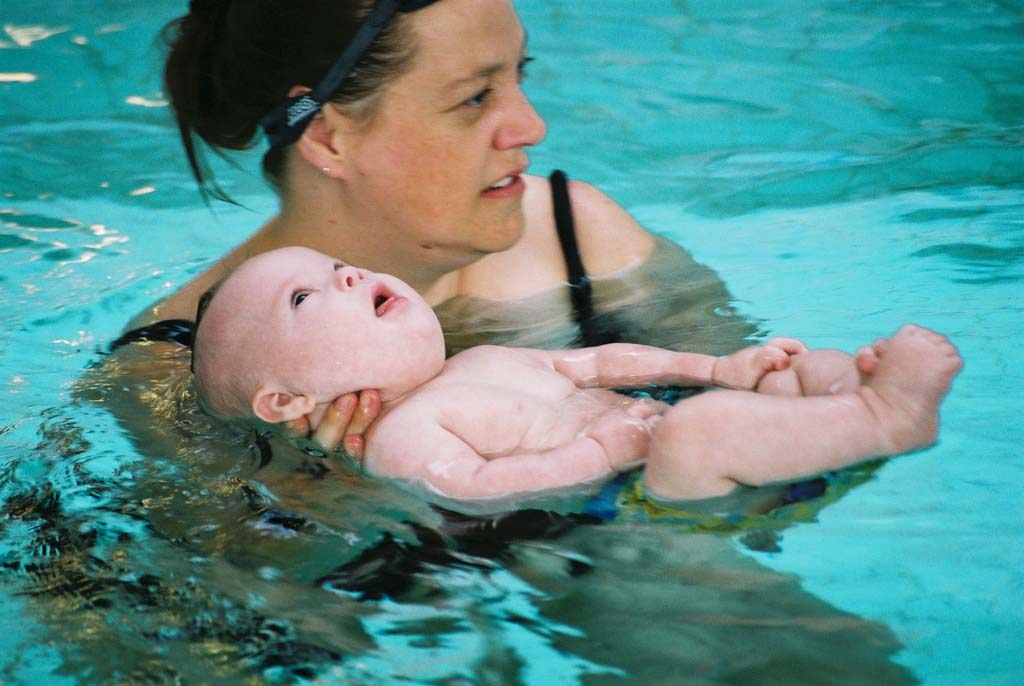
A mother holding her baby during a swimming lesson

Traditionally, swimming lessons started at age four years or later, as children under four were not considered developmentally ready. However, swimming lessons for infants have become more common. The Australian Swimming Coaches and Teachers Association recommends that infants can start a formal program of swimming lessons at four months of age and many accredited swimming schools offer classes for very young children, especially towards the beginning of the swimming season in October. In the US, the YMCA and American Red Cross offer swim classes. A baby has to be able to hold his or her head up (usually at 3 to 4 months) to be ready for swimming lessons.

Children can be taught, through a series of "prompts and procedures," to float on their backs to breathe, and then to flip over and swim toward a wall or other safe area. Children are essentially taught to swim, flip over and float, then flip over and swim again. Thus, the method is called "swim, float, swim."

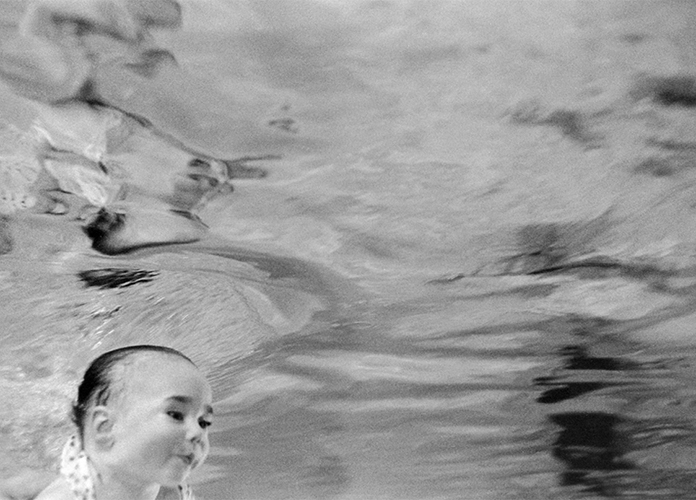

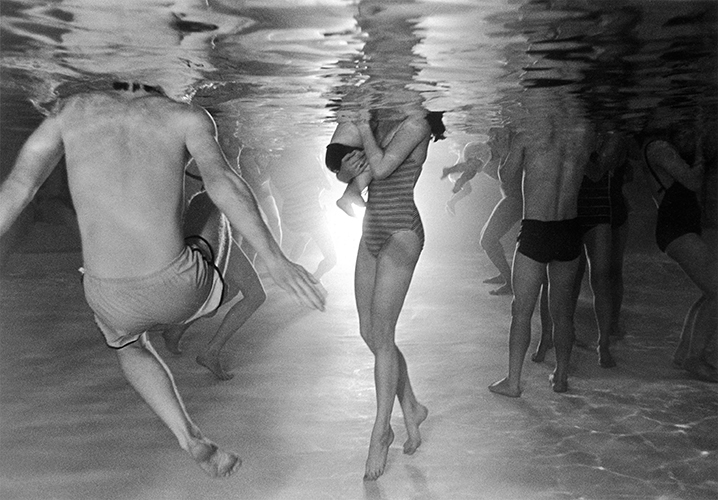

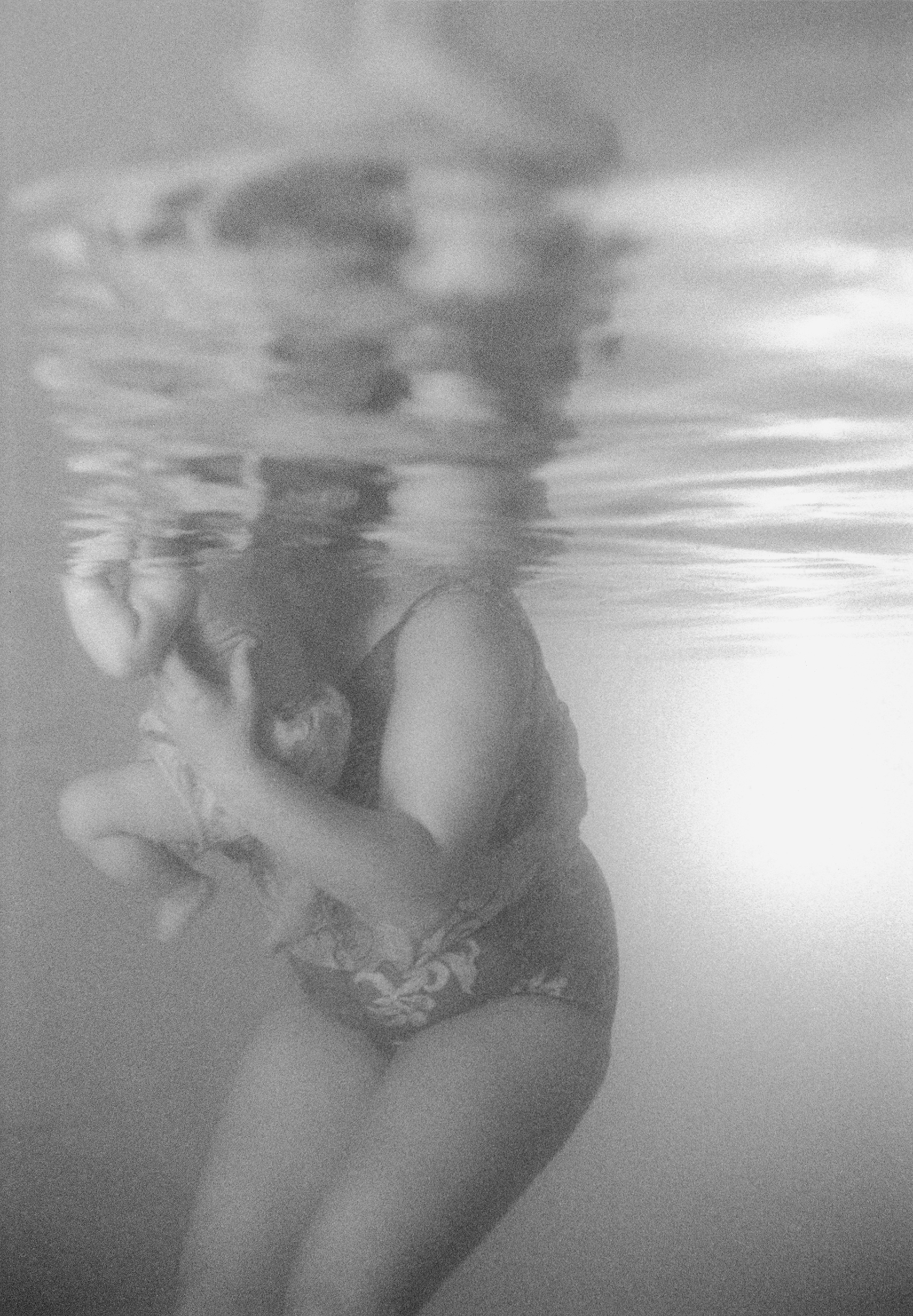

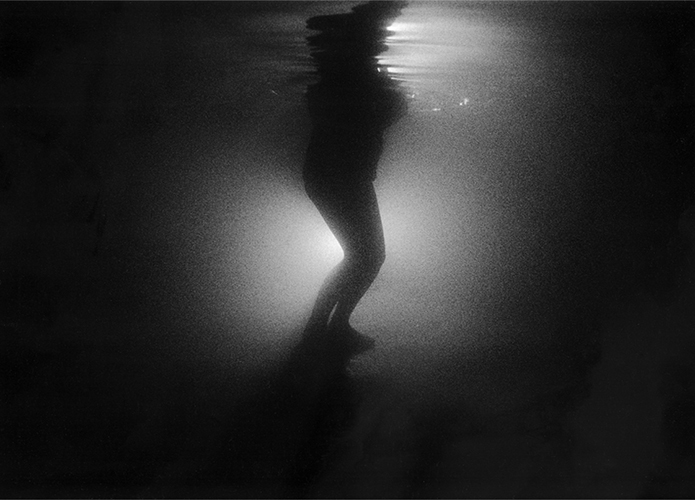

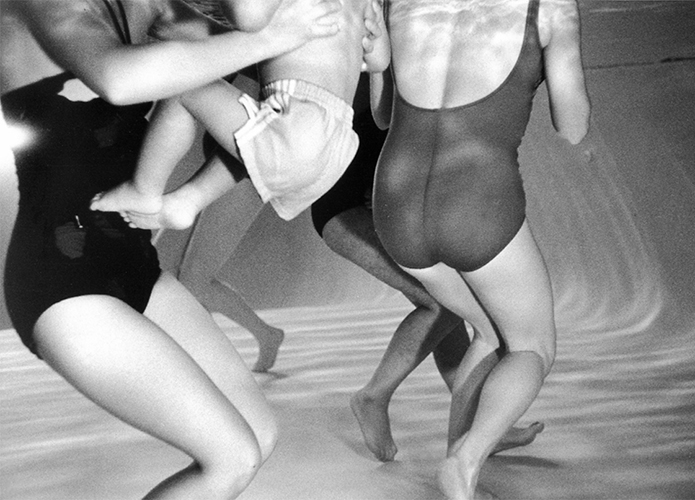

Water babies infant swimming lessons in State College, Pennsylvania, 1984

=== Pros and cons of infant swimming lessons ===
In a 2009 retrospective case–control study that involved significant potential sources of bias, participation in formal swimming lessons was associated with an 88% reduction in the risk of drowning in 1- to 4-year-old children, although the authors of the study found the conclusion imprecise. Another study showed that infant swimming lessons may improve motor skills, but the number of study subjects was too low to be conclusive.

A study found that babies who participated in water activities during their first year of life tended to have better motor skills than babies who did not. This suggests that infant swimming lessons may help babies improve their movement and coordination. However, more research is needed to fully understand these benefits.

There may be a link between infant swimming and rhinovirus-induced wheezing illnesses.

Others have indicated concerns that the lessons might be traumatic, that the parents will have a false sense of security and not supervise young children adequately around pools, or that the infant could experience hypothermia, suffer from water intoxication after swallowing water, or develop gastrointestinal or skin infections.

Researchers explained that the findings about infant swimming are not yet definite because the study was only an early investigation. This means that more studies are needed to better understand how swimming affects babies’ development. More research could help determine how beneficial infant swimming lessons are for young children.

=== Professional positions ===
In 2010, the American Academy of Pediatrics reversed its previous position in which it had disapproved of lessons before age 4, indicating that the evidence no longer supported an advisory against early swimming lessons. However, the AAP stated that it found the evidence at that time insufficient to support a recommendation that all 1- to 4-year-old children receive swimming lessons. The AAP further stated that in spite of the popularity of swimming lessons for infants under 12 months of age and anecdotal evidence of infants having saved themselves, no scientific study had clearly demonstrated the safety and efficacy of training programs for infants that young. The AAP indicated its position that the possible benefit of early swimming instruction must be weighed against the potential risks (e.g., hypothermia, hyponatremia, infectious illness, and lung damage from pool chemicals).

The U.S. Centers for Disease Control and Prevention recommends swimming lessons for children from 1–4, along with other precautionary measures to prevent drowning.

The Canadian Pediatric Society takes a middle-of-the-road approach. While it does not advise against swimming lessons for infants and toddlers, it advises that they can not be considered a reliable prevention for drowning, and that lessons for children less than 4 years should focus on building confidence in the water and teaching parents and children water safety skills. They also recommend, for all children less than 4 years, constant arms-length supervision for toddlers near any body of water (including bathtubs) and that infants be held at all times.
