= Open Water Wisdom =

Open Water Wisdom is a community water activity safety program that was spearheaded by The Royal Life Saving Society of Canada and The Canadian Red Cross. It is dedicated to bringing awareness to recreational water safety issues nationally and in hundreds of remote communities across Canada.

== History ==
Children and youth are at higher risk for water injury and drowning, most especially in Canada’s remote northern, rural, Aboriginal and coastal communities. This is partly because many of Canada’s communities sit next to open water and at most times of the year the water is cold. There are also indications that several cultural issues can contribute to higher drowning rates in some parts of the country.

In 2011, Lifesaving Canada and The Canadian Red Cross were given funding by The Public Health Agency of Canada in support of the Open Water Wisdom initiative. In 2012, the campaign released several national radio Public Service Announcements about how to stay safe around open water during summer months.

== Activities ==
The campaign has targeted over 250 communities across the country, with a special focus on youth 19 years of age or younger. Open Water Wisdomʼs activities are rooted in providing local community champions with lifejackets and resource training kits about cold water safety issues. Local champions provide water activity safety training to their communities based on the materials and resources supplied to participating communities. The official objectives of the campaign are to:

- Reduce water related incidents and drowning rates and increase lifejacket usage among children and youth;
- Increase public awareness of risks and actions needed to prevent injury and death through drowning;
- Influence children and youth, families and communities to adopt behavior and practices that increase their safety in, on and around the water while participating in recreation, sport and play activities;
- Engage communities and build capacity to sustain and facilitate ongoing access to education materials and lifejackets;
- Provide resources for children and youth, families, communities and professionals to prevent injury and drowning.
