= Wilberforce Red Cross Outpost =

National Historic Site of Canada

- Dispensaire de la Croix Rouge de Wilberforce
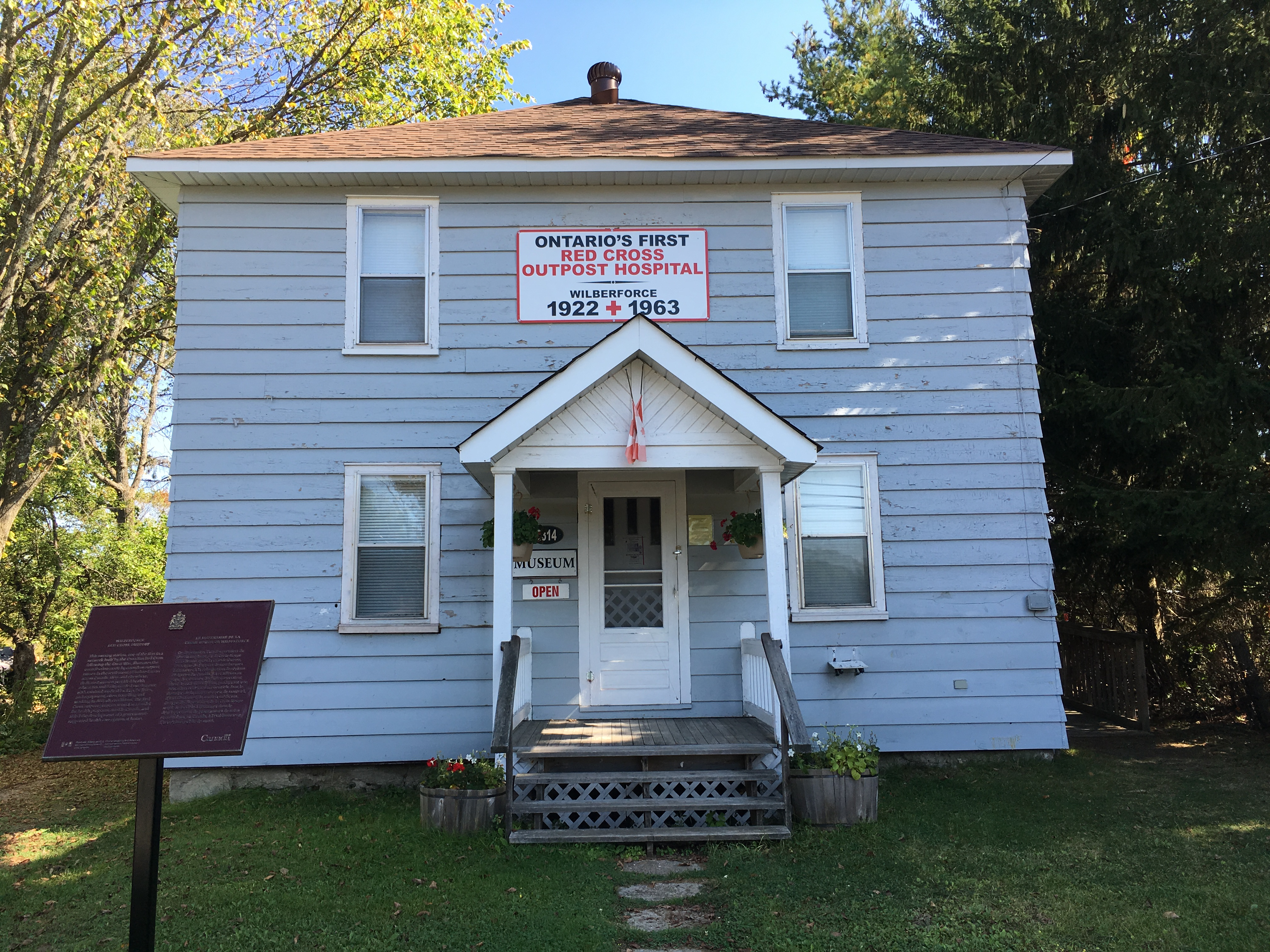
- The outpost in 2017
- Coordinates: 45°02′20.24″N 78°13′25.27″W
- Area: Wilberforce, Canada
- Built: 1914–1916
- Built for: Private residence, before being converted into a nursing station

National Historic Site of Canada
- Designated: 30 June 2003

The Wilberforce Red Cross Outpost, located in the village of Wilberforce, Ontario is the location of the first Red Cross health post in Ontario. It was designated as a national historic site of Canada in 2003.

== History ==
Prior to World War I, the Canadian Red Cross Society's work was undertaken only overseas. Around 1919, the organisation consciously changed its strategic direction to focus more on the health of Canadians.

Wilberforce Red Cross Outpost was constructed from 1914 to 1916, initially as a private residence. In 1922, due to their limited funding, the Canadian Red Cross rented the building. From then until 1957, it was used by the Red Cross as a nursing station, a health centre, an emergency hospital, and a residence for the nurse employed on site. Nurses would be on call 24 hour per day, seven days per week. Due to a lack of training combined with unmet needs, nurses would often operate beyond their scope of practise, in areas such as obstetrics and public health programs. From 1957 to 1963 the health post provided some medical services. Nurses included Gertrude LeRoy Miller, Anne Casey, and Margaret MacLachlan.

After refurbishment led by local historian Hilda Clark, the Canadian Minister of Heritage Sheila Copps designated the site as a national historic site of Canada in 2003. A plaque was unveiled in 2006.

== Heritage value ==
The site was made a national historic site because it highlights the role of nursing and health education in remote and rural locations in Canada. The Canadian Red Cross program of building nursing outposts bolstered colonisation efforts and also demonstrated to government the need for healthcare in remote locations, advancing the creation of the social welfare state in Canada. The nursing station, as a heritage site, provides knowledge to the Canadian public about the role of the Canadian Red Cross.

== Architecture ==
The two-storey building was constructed in the normal local style for private residences with timber framed walls, a truncated hipped roof, and open porch on the front above the main entrance door. It is situated on a quarter-acre plot between two private residences, slightly set back from Burleigh Road/Ontario Highway 648 with Dark Lake to the rear.

== In popular culture ==
Nurse Gertrude LeRoy Miller wrote about experience working in the nursing station from 1930 to 1034 in Mustard Plasters and Handcars: Through the Eyes of a Red Cross Outpost Nurse.
