= Bronze Medallion (Canada) =

- Bronze Medallion Logo
- Awarded for: Candidates who successfully complete the Bronze Medallion program.
- Sponsored by: Lifesaving Society
- Date: 1896
- Country: Canada
- Reward: Certificate
- Website: www.lifesavingsociety.com/swimming-lifesaving/lifesaving/bronze-medallion.aspx

The Bronze Medallion is the second step towards the lifeguarding certification in Canada. The award is part of the Lifesaving Society's Bronze series of awards. It teaches an understanding of the lifesaving principles embodied in the four components of water rescue education: judgment, knowledge, skill, and fitness. It is the prerequisite for Bronze Cross, which along with Standard First Aid with CPR-C and 15 years of age are the prerequisites for National Lifeguard. The Bronze Medallion endurance swim requirement is 400 meters (440 yd) in 12 minutes using any combination of strokes.

== History ==
Lifesaving Society's Bronze Medallion program began in 1896 as Canada's first lifesaving certification program.

== Prerequisites ==
The Lifesaving Society requires Bronze Medallion candidates meet the following prerequisites (award may be expired):

- 13 years of age, OR
- Bronze Star
