= Water Safety Instructor =

The Water Safety Instructor (WSI) program is an aquatics program, specific to swim instructing, regulated and certified primarily through the Canadian Red Cross and American Red Cross.

Water Safety Instructor certification focuses on preparing candidates to teach the Red Cross Swim programs, it teaches candidates to introduce and develop fitness activities, skills and water safety and swimming skills in several Red Cross programs. The WSI course is recognized by the National Coaching Certification Program (NCCP), Swimming Canada and the Coaching Association of Canada. To become a lifeguard in Canada, some employers require you also hold certification as a Water Safety Instructor.

== See also ==
- Swimming lessons
