= Bronze Cross (Canada) =

- Bronze Cross Logo
- Awarded for: Candidates who successfully complete the Bronze Cross program.
- Sponsored by: Lifesaving Society
- Country: Canada
- Reward: Certificate
- Website: www.lifesavingsociety.com/lifeguarding/bronze-cross.aspx

The Bronze Cross is a certification in water rescue that is the mainstay of the lifesaving training offered in Canada, and awarded by the Royal Life Saving Society of Canada. Before one can take the Bronze Cross course, the Bronze Medallion (Canada) is required. With Bronze Cross and Standard First Aid certification, one can be an assistant lifeguard in some provinces. For National Lifeguard Certification or to become an Instructor, a current or expired Bronze Cross and current Standard First Aid certification are required. The Bronze Cross endurance swim requirement is 400 meters in 11 minutes using either front swim, back swim, breast stroke throughout the swim.

== Prerequisites ==
The Lifesaving Society requires Bronze Cross candidates have obtained the following certifications, which may be current or expired:

- Bronze Medallion
