= Weather Stress Index =

Relative measure of weather conditions

The Weather Stress Index, or WSI, is a relative measure of the weather conditions, often used as a comfort indicator. The index, a number between 0 and 100, represents the percentage of time in the past with temperatures below the current temperature, for a given location, day and time. This makes the index a local measure based in past weather conditions. For example, if for a given location, on the 25th of July at 13:00 UTC the WSI is 85 for a temperature of 42 °C (108 °F), this means that the temperature was inferior to 42 °C in 85% of the time in the past, on the same place, on the 25th of July at 13:00 UTC (and superior to 42 °C in 15% of the time on the same place, day and hour). In other words, the WSI gives the probability of finding a smaller temperature in the local weather history, at a given day and time, than that of the present measurement. Therefore, high values of WSI predict a relative discomfort from excessive heat for local inhabitants.

== Using the index ==
The same WSI for different geographic points might not refer to the same temperature - a WSI of 99.99 for a given location near the North Pole might refer to a temperature that, in lower latitudes, could be rated with a WSI of 50 (an average temperature) for the same day and hour.

== See also ==
- Heat index
- Meteorology
