= National Lifeguard =

- National Lifeguard Logo
- Awarded for: Candidates who successfully complete the National Lifeguard program.
- Sponsored by: Lifesaving Society
- Country: Canada
- Reward: Certificate
- First award: 1964
- Website: www.lifesavingsociety.com/lifeguarding/national-lifeguard.aspx

National Lifeguard, commonly known as an NL or NLS, is a lifeguarding certification program in Canada, offered by the Lifesaving Society.

National Lifeguard certification builds on the fundamental skills, knowledge and values of the Lifesaving Society to develop the practical skills and knowledge required by lifeguards. National Lifeguard education is designed to develop a sound understanding of lifeguarding principles, good judgment and a mature and responsible attitude toward the role of the lifeguard.

The primary role of the National Lifeguard is the prevention of emergency situations and where this fails, the timely and effective resolution of emergencies. The National Lifeguard program is designed to prepare lifeguards to fulfill this role as professional facilitators of safe, enjoyable aquatics.

== Industry standard ==
National Lifeguard was officially launched in 1964 in response to a need identified by employers for a single, recognized lifeguard certification for those charged with the responsibility of supervising pools and waterfronts. In 1973, the Lifesaving Society Canada, one of the National Lifeguard founding members, assumed responsibility for National Lifeguard. National Lifeguard is endorsed and supported by the National Lifeguard Advisory Committee composed of lifeguard employers, facility operators and national agencies: Canadian Parks and Recreation Association, Physical and Health Education Canada, YMCA and Canadian Forces.

=== Training ===
The National Lifeguard course (minimum 40 hours) cannot in theory or practice prepare candidates for every situation which might be encountered by National Lifeguards working in Canadian aquatic environments and facilities. National Lifeguard training is designed to develop the basic lifeguarding skills, principles and decision-making processes which will assist the lifeguard to evaluate and adapt to different aquatic facilities and emergencies. The National Lifeguard certification is available in four options – Pool, Waterpark, Waterfront and Surf. To maintain certification, lifeguards engage in recertification training every two years for a minimum of 4 hours specific to the National Lifeguard option they wish to keep current.

=== Prerequisites ===
Minimum 15 years of age (or 16, depending on the province), Lifesaving Society Bronze Cross certification, and Standard First Aid certification. National Lifeguard Pool certification is a prerequisite to National Lifeguard Waterpark; however both can be taken as a combination course. National Lifeguard Waterfront certification is a prerequisite to National Lifeguard Surf.
