= Canadian Red Cross =

Canadian humanitarian organization

The Canadian Red Cross Society
- Croix-Rouge canadienne
- Established: 16 October 1896 (130 years ago)
- Types: Charitable organization
- Headquarters: Ottawa, Ontario
- Directors: Conrad Sauvé
- Chairpersons: The Governor General of Canada
- Revenue: 442,356,566 Canadian dollar (2024)
- Total Assets: 603,847,482 Canadian dollar (2024)
- Employees: 3,419 (2024)
- Volunteers: 14,531 (2023)

The Canadian Red Cross Society (French: La Société canadienne de la Croix-Rouge) is a Canadian humanitarian charitable organization, and one of 192 national Red Cross and Red Crescent societies. The organization receives funding from both private donations and from Canadian government departments.

The Canadian Red Cross trains volunteers in emergency response, disaster response, and disaster assistance, and provides injury prevention services such as outdoor activities safety and first aid training. The society, through the international network of the Red Cross, helps people worldwide, including victims of armed conflicts and communities destroyed by disasters. The Canadian Red Cross also handled the Canadian blood supply, until that responsibility was taken away from them in the aftermath of the tainted blood scandal.

The current Secretary General and Chief Executive Officer of the Canadian Red Cross is Conrad Sauvé.

== History ==
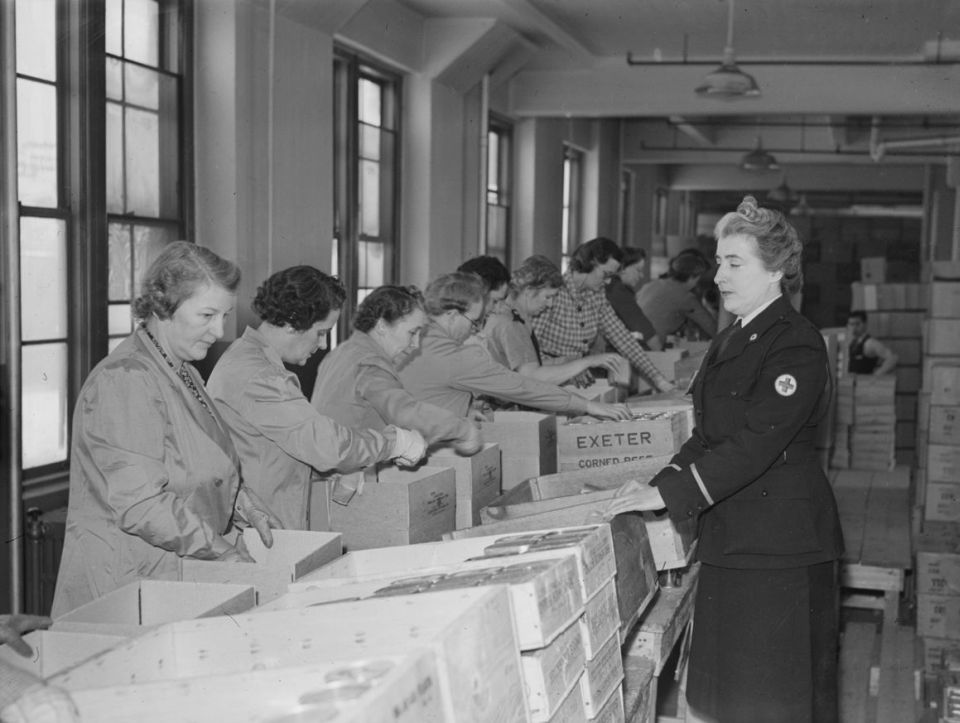
Volunteers from Canadian Red Cross assemble packages for prisoners of war during the Second World War.

The Canadian Red Cross was established in the fall of 1896 as an affiliate of the British Red Cross Society (then known as the National Society for Aid to the Sick and Wounded in War). George Ryerson, who had founded Canada's St. John Ambulance Association in 1895, spearheaded the organization's founding. The Canadian Red Cross Society Act (1909) legally established the Red Cross as the corporate body in Canada responsible for providing volunteer aid in accordance with the Geneva Conventions.

The first international activity of the Canadian Red Cross was giving medical assistance in South Africa during the Boer War.

After the end of World War I in 1918, the Society began training public health nurses. The Wilberforce Red Cross Outpost was established in 1922. A children's program designed to promote healthy living, the Junior Red Cross, was set up in schools across Canada.

For many years the Canadian Red Cross was responsible for collecting blood from donors for medical use. The Ottawa Branch of Canadian Blood Services operated from a building on Metcalfe Street which was donated by Mary Alice Danner in memory of Flight Sergeant William Dewey Hagyard R.C.A.F. who was missing in action in WWII. The branch later relocated to Plymouth Street. In 1998, after serious flaws in the blood collection process were uncovered, the Society stopped providing this service.

The Canadian Red Cross had its centennial celebration in May 2009. In 2017 the Red Cross provided food, shelter and medicine to asylum seekers crossing the border into Canada from the United States.

== Programs in Canada ==
=== Emergencies and disasters ===
The Canadian Red Cross provides assistance to Canadians experiencing an emergency or disaster. The organization works in partnership with government, first responders, emergency management, and other organizations to support their response activities. They also provide assistance for people's basic needs, which includes: family reunification, lodging, reception and information, food, clothing, and personal services, such as first aid, temporary care for children or elderly, and other support.

In February 2022, Canada Red Cross launched a program to support the long-term recovery needs of people impacted by the flooding and extreme weather events in British Columbia that began on November 14, 2021. The organization provided financial support to people from eligible households to help cover their interim housing and basic needs while they transition to longer-term housing.

=== Community health services ===
==== Community support services ====
The Canadian Red Cross offers a range of community support services that provide daily supports to older adults, vulnerable people, and their caregivers. The goal of these programs is to provide support in maintaining quality of life, independence, and active participation in society. Some of the programs and services available include: nutrition support programs (such as Meals on Wheels), social inclusion programs, assisted living in supportive housing and attendant outreach services, safety programs, and transportation. The availability of these programs varies. The Red Cross also provides services to homeless people during extreme weather.

==== Health Equipment Loan Program (HELP) ====
This program provides health equipment to individuals dealing with illness or injury, enabling them to return home from the hospital sooner or live more independently. The program operates in British Columbia, Alberta, Prince Edward Island, Nova Scotia, Newfoundland and Labrador, and the Yukon Territory. The types of assistive equipment that can be provided include: wheelchairs, walkers, bath seats and benches, commodes and toilet seats, crutches and canes, bed handles, and other durable medical equipment. The program is funded through financial donations as well as through the donation of used medical equipment, diverting it from the landfill, and it carried out with the support of volunteers and the health authorities.

==== Home care services ====
The Canadian Red Cross offers personal support and homemaking services to support the independent living of seniors and those recovering from illness or injury. These services include: personal care, home management, and respite and companion care. Home care services are available in Nova Scotia, and Ontario.

=== Migrant and refugee services ===
The Canadian Red Cross has been involved in the independent monitoring of detention facilities holding immigration detainees since 1999, following a request from Citizenship and Immigration Canada (CIC). The organization provides independent monitoring to determine if detainees are treated humanely and their human rights and inherent dignity are respected. As of 2014, this includes visiting federal immigration holding facilities and some provincial correctional facilities in Quebec, Ontario, Alberta, British Columbia, and Manitoba.

=== Safety, first aid, and CPR ===
The Canadian Red Cross is involved in treating the wounded on the fields of war and to training individuals to effectively handle emergencies both at home and in the workplace. The organization has been offering first aid and CPR training to Canadians for over 50 years. In an average year, about 600,000 Canadians are trained.

In 1946 the Red Cross Swimming and Water Safety programs were introduced as a result of a large number of drownings that occurred in Canada in the 1940s. Since then, more than 30 million Canadians, in more than 3,500 communities across Canada were to taught to swim and stay safe around water. The swimming program ended in 2022 to direct more attention to humanitarian efforts as the operations were transferred to the Lifesaving Society.

In 2012, The Canadian Red Cross and Lifesaving Society joined forces with the Public Health Agency of Canada to launch the Open Water Wisdom initiative, which is a community water activity safety program which promotes awareness of water safety issues nationally, including to remote communities across Canada.

== International programs ==
=== Emergencies and disasters ===
The Canadian Red Cross delivers primary healthcare programs, relief supplies, water, and sanitation and shelter solutions to vulnerable communities affected by conflict, disasters, and health emergencies. The Society's international programming supports community-based programs that provide large-scale humanitarian aid.

=== International development ===
The Canadian Red Cross has long-term development programs in the regions of Africa, the Americas, Asia, and the Middle East and North Africa.

=== Maternal, newborn, and child health ===
The Canadian Red Cross supports community-based health programs which address preventable illness in mothers and children, including malaria, pneumonia, diarrhea, and malnutrition, particularly in remote areas where there is a lack of health services and emergencies where health services have collapsed. They also provide education about reproduction, newborn care and breastfeeding, nutrition for young children, hygiene, sanitation, and methods of accessing potable water.

== Controversy ==
=== Krever Commission ===
Until September 28, 1998, the Canadian Red Cross was responsible for all blood services in Canada. On the recommendation of the Krever Commission, the organization was removed from this position and replaced by the Canadian Blood Services. This was due to nationwide controversy when it was revealed that the Canadian Red Cross had supplied, between 1986 and 1990, blood which it knew might be tainted with hepatitis C and HIV.

During the AIDS crisis, the Canadian Red Cross Society had accused the Haitian community of carrying the AIDS virus without any factual or empirical evidence and banned them from donating blood. Haitian communities and organizations had worked with other activist groups such as the AIDS Committee of Toronto and organized against the Red Cross due to this.

In 1994, an investigation found that 95 percent of hemophiliacs who used blood products supplied by the Canadian Red Cross prior to 1990 had contracted hepatitis C. According to the Krever Commission, approximately 85 percent of those infections could have been prevented. A case that calls attention to this statistic is the distribution of Marine Simon Thwaites' blood in Halifax, Nova Scotia in 1983-1984. Their blood was not properly tested by the Canadian Red Cross before distribution. After his blood was administered he was notified that someone had a bad reaction to his blood and he was advised to seek further testing. Thwaites then tested HIV-positive shortly after and when he asked for more information on his condition from the Red Cross they responded by telling him they were unsure of what to do and directed him to return to work.

The lack of testing donated blood continued to contribute to others becoming HIV-positive. Just a year later in December 1985, a child who received blood from the Canadian Red Cross died. After an autopsy was performed it was confirmed it was due to HIV. Reid Gagnon, also received blood from that batch of plasma, and was encouraged to get tested. He was found to be positive as well. It was confirmed that the Red Cross had not tested numerous batches of donated blood for HIV or antibodies although the testing was widely available. After patients tested HIV-positive, the Red Cross, the hospital where the transfusion occurred, and the surgeon present, were silent and never reached out to other patients. This is all despite Gagnon, and his wife Mary Gagnon, making an attempt to be seen and heard by the Red Cross. After Reid Gagnon passed, his wife finally heard from the hospital, however, it was only a request for the funds due. Mary Gagnon sent out a letter with her concerns and received no response from the Red Cross, only a hospital administrator apologizing and claiming in the future similar situations would be handled differently.

In 1992, after this issue continued to occur, the gay community, hemophiliacs and people receiving blood transfusions reached out to have a conversation about the lack of testing performed on donated blood. The Red Cross refused to meet with them about this prominent issue. Responsibility was failed to be accepted by the Canadian Red Cross despite the seemingly never ending amount of affected peoples.

Compared to blood services in Europe and the United States, the CRC was slow to disseminate information about possible infection to those receiving blood products. More than 1,100 Canadians were infected with HIV and 20,000 contracted hepatitis C from blood transfusions given by the Red Cross during that period.

The Canadian Red Cross was fined $5,000 for its role in the tainted blood scandal and the organization agreed to plead guilty to distributing a contaminated drug. It agreed to donate $1.5 million to the University of Ottawa for a research endowment fund, as well as a scholarship for the family members of those affected. In exchange, six criminal charges against the Canadian Red Cross were dropped.

Dr. Roger Perrault, the director of the Canadian Red Cross at the time, was put on trial for his role in the scandal. The first trial, in Toronto before the Superior Court of Justice, resulted in an acquittal. He had been charged with four counts of criminal negligence causing bodily harm and one of common nuisance. The counts of criminal negligence were specific to four victims who had contracted HIV from tainted blood. The second trial, in Hamilton, also before the Superior Court of Justice, resulted in charges being withdrawn. The charges were six counts of common nuisance and "stemmed from an allegation he endangered the public by failing to properly screen donors, implement testing for blood-borne viruses and warn the public of the danger regarding hepatitis C and HIV" and relate to a period of time in which the understanding of AIDS was even more rudimentary. The charges were withdrawn on the basis that there was no longer a reasonable prospect of conviction.

== See also ==
- Canadian Blood Services
- List of Canadian organizations with royal patronage
- List of Red Cross and Red Crescent Societies
- Monument to Canadian Aid Workers
- Royal Commission of Inquiry on the Blood System in Canada
