= Royal Life Saving Society Canada =

Canadian registered charity

Lifesaving Society
- The Royal Life Saving Society Canada
- Established: 1908
- Type: Nonprofit
- Legal status: Registered charity
- Region served: Canada
- Official language: English, French
- Website: www.lifesaving.ca

The Royal Life Saving Society Canada, commonly known as the Lifesaving Society or LSS, is a Canadian registered charity that works to prevent water-related injuries through various programs across Canada. The Lifesaving Society is an independent organization that is composed of ten provincial/territorial branches, tens of thousands of individual members, and over 4,000 affiliated swimming pools, waterfronts, schools and clubs. The society helps prevent drowning and aquatic injury through its training programs, public education, drowning-prevention research, safety management and overseeing the sport of lifesaving. They are one of five nationally recognized first aid training organizations in Canada, alongside the Heart and Stroke Foundation, Red Cross, St. John Ambulance, and the Canadian Ski Patrol.

== History ==
The Royal Life Saving Society arrived in Canada in 1894 with its Honorary Representative, Arthur Lewis Cochrane, who joined the faculty of Upper Canada College in Toronto as a "Drill Instructor". The society became formalized with the establishment in 1908 of the Ontario Branch as the first Canadian branch of the Royal Life Saving Society UK.

The Ontario branch of the RLSS was founded on December 10, 1908, with J. Howard Crocker as a charter member. Crocker introduced RLSS to the YMCA curriculum, and served as president of the Ontario branch of the RLSS from 1934 to 1937.

== Programs and certifications ==
Annually, over one million Canadians take part in the society's swimming, lifesaving, lifeguard and leadership training programs. The Lifesaving Society is incorporated in Canada under the name "The Royal Life Saving Society Canada/La Société Royale de Sauvetage Canada", and it has branches for every province and territory. The Lifesaving Society represents Canada in the International Life Saving Federation and the Royal Life Saving Society Commonwealth.

The society sets the standards for aquatic safety in Canada and certifies Canada's National Lifeguards. The society is the Canadian governing body for the sport of lifesaving, which is recognized by the International Olympic Committee and the Commonwealth Games Federation.

In 2012, the Lifesaving Society joined forces with the Canadian Red Cross and the Public Health Agency of Canada to launch the Open Water Wisdom initiative, which is a community water activity safety program dedicated to bringing awareness to recreational water safety issues nationally and in hundreds of remote communities across Canada.

== See also ==
- Royal Life Saving Society Australia
- Surf lifesaving
