= 31st Hong Kong Film Awards =

2012 Hong Kong Film Awards

- Final revision poster modified by Hong Kong Film Awards Association
- Date: 15 April 2012
- Site: Hong Kong Cultural Centre
- Hosted by: Eric Tsang, Bowie Tsang, Gordon Lam, Ronald Cheng, Angelababy
- Organized by: Hong Kong Film Awards Association Ltd

Highlights
- Best Picture: A Simple Life
- Most awards: A Simple Life, Flying Swords of Dragon Gate (5)
- Most nominations: Flying Swords of Dragon Gate, Let the Bullets Fly (13)

Television coverage
- Network: TVB, Now TV, RTHK Radio 2 (live)

The 31st Hong Kong Film Awards presentation ceremony took place in Hong Kong Cultural Centre on 15 April 2012. The hosts for the awards ceremony are Eric Tsang, Bowie Tsang, Gordon Lam, Ronald Cheng and Angelababy. TVB, Now TV and RTHK Radio 2 were the live broadcasters of the ceremony, with other networks airing simulcasts around the world.

The film A Simple Life won five of its major nominations (film, director, screenplay, actor, actress). Deanie Ip became the oldest Best Actress Award-winner in the history of Hong Kong Film Awards. Ann Hui has now won four Best Director Awards, the most in awards history.

Let the Bullets Fly directed by Jiang Wen and Flying Swords of Dragon Gate directed by Tsui Hark dominated the nominations in 13 categories, including Best Film and Best Director. Individually, Jiang Wen got nominated in four categories (director, actor, screenplay, film editing).

== Awards ==
Winners are listed first, highlighted in boldface, and indicated with a double dagger (‡).

**Best Film**: **Roger Lee, Ann Hui and Chan Pui-wah — A Simple Life**‡; Johnnie To — Life without Principle; Tsui Hark — Flying Swords of Dragon Gate; Derek Yee — Overheard 2; Ma Ke, Albert Lee, Yin Homber, Barbie Tung and Zhao Haicheng — Let the Bullets Fly	**Best Director**: **Ann Hui — A Simple Life**‡; Johnnie To — Life without Principle; Tsui Hark — Flying Swords of Dragon Gate; Alan Mak and Felix Chong — Overheard 2; Jiang Wen — Let the Bullets Fly
**Best Screenplay**: **Susan Chan — A Simple Life**‡; Wai Ka-Fai, Yau Nai-hoi, Ryker Chan and Jevons Au — Don’t Go Breaking My Heart; Milkyway Creative Team, Au Kin-Yee and Wong King-Fai — Life without Principle; Alan Mak and Felix Chong — Overheard 2	**Best Actor**: **Andy Lau — A Simple Life**‡; Sean Lau — Life without Principle; Sean Lau — Overheard 2; Jiang Wen — Let the Bullets Fly; Ge You — Let the Bullets Fly
**Best Actress**: **Deanie Ip — A Simple Life**‡; Shu Qi — A Beautiful Life; Tang Wei — Wu Xia; Gao Yuanyuan — Don’t Go Breaking My Heart; Zhou Xun — Flying Swords of Dragon Gate	**Best Supporting Actor**: **Lo Hoi-pang — Life without Principle**‡; Paul Chiang — A Simple Life; Nicholas Tse — Shaolin; Kenneth Tsang — Overheard 2; Jimmy Wang — Wu Xia
**Best Supporting Actress**: **So Hang Shuen — Life without Principle**‡; Kara Wai — Wu Xia; Qin Hailu — A Simple Life; Gwei Lun-mei — Flying Swords of Dragon Gate; Carina Lau — Let the Bullets Fly	**Best New Performer**: **Jam Hsiao — The Killer Who Never Kills**‡; Shiga Lin — Lan Kwai Fong; Zheng Shuang — Mural; Karena Ng — Magic to Win; Sheng Chien — Flying Swords of Dragon Gate
**Best Cinematography**: **Jake Pollock and Lai Yiu-fai — Wu Xia**‡; Yu Lik-wai — A Simple Life; Johnny Choi — Flying Swords of Dragon Gate; Anthony Pun — Overheard 2; Zhao Fei — Let the Bullets Fly	**Best Film Editing**: **Yau Chi-Wai — Flying Swords of Dragon Gate**‡; Derek Hui — Wu Xia; David Richardson — Life without Principle; Curran Pang — Overheard 2; Jiang Wen and Cao Wei Jie — Let the Bullets Fly
**Best Art Direction**: **Kenneth Yee and Lau Man-Hung** **— Flying Swords of Dragon Gate**‡; Kenneth Yee and Lau Man-Hung — Shaolin; Daniel Lee — White Vengeance; Eddy Wong, Yu Qing Hua and Gao Yi Guang — Let the Bullets Fly	**Best Costume Make Up Design**: **William Chang — Let the Bullets Fly**‡; Dora Ng — Wu Xia; Ng Po-Ling — Mural; Lai Hsuan-Wu — Flying Swords of Dragon Gate; Eddy Mok and Debby Wong — White Vengeance
**Best Action Choreography**: **Yuen Bun, Lan Hai-Han and Sun Jiankui** **— Flying Swords of Dragon Gate**‡; Donnie Yen — Wu Xia; Cory Yuen, Yuen Tak and Li Chung-Chi — Shaolin; Sit Chun-Wai and Li Chung-Chi — Let the Bullets Fly	**Best Original Film Score**: **Comfort Chan, Peter Kam** **and Chatchai Pongprapaphan — Wu Xia**‡; Comfort Chan — A Beautiful Life; Wu Wai-Lap, Li Han-Chiang and Gu Xin — Flying Swords of Dragon Gate; Henry Lai Wan-man — White Vengeance; Comfort Chan — Overheard 2
**Best Original Film Song**: **Leung Sum Fa — Hi, Fidelity**‡; Composer: Jun Kung; Lyricist: Calvin Poon; Singer: Sandy Lam; Chuo Guo Le Di Zi — A Beautiful Life; Composer, Lyricist and Singer: Ivana Wong; Mi Zou Jiang Wu — Wu Xia; Composer, Lyricist and Singer: Dou Wei; Ng — Shaolin; Composer: Q.luv; Lyricist and Singer: Andy Lau; Shui Man Jin Shan — Life without Principle; Composer and Singer: Yue Wei; Lyricist: Lin Xi	**Best Sound Design**: **Kim Suk-won (sound designer) — Flying Swords of Dragon Gate**‡; Nopawat Likitwong and Traithep Wongpaiboon — Wu Xia; Phyllis Cheng and Lam Siu-yu — White Vengeance; Kinson Tsang — Overheard 2; Wen Bo and Wang Gang — Let the Bullets Fly
**Best Visual Effects**: **Wook Kim, Josh Cole and** **Frankie Chung — Flying Swords of Dragon Gate**‡; Ryu Hee Jung, Eddy Wong and Law Wai-Ho — The Sorcerer and the White Snake; Yung Kwok-Yin and Andy Kang — Wu Xia; Christopher Bremble — Mural; Victor Wong and Xie Yi Wen — Let the Bullets Fly	**Best New Director**: **Tsang Tsui Shan — Big Blue Lake**‡; Calvin Poon — Hi, Fidelity; Bill Yip — Cure
**Best Film from Mainland and Taiwan**: **Giddens Ko — You Are the Apple of My Eye (Taiwan)** ‡; Zhang Yimou — The Flowers of War (mainland China); Feng Xiaogang — If You Are the One 2 (mainland China); Tom Lin Shu-yu — Starry Starry Night (Taiwan); Wei Te-sheng — Seediq Bale (Taiwan)

== Special awards ==
Lifetime Achievement Award
Name	Gender	Occupation(s)	Reason
Ni Kuang	Male	novelist, screenwriter	He has written over 300 scripts including One-Armed Swordsman and Fist of Fury. His achievements of the field of screenwriting are extraordinary. Thus, his driving force for the development of Hong Kong film industry is important.

Professional Achievement Award
Name	Gender	Occupation(s)	Reason
Fong Ho Yuen	Male	stills cinematographer	He has worked for over 80 films in about 40 years. He is a very dedicated person and his spirit should be learnt by other people.

== Presenters ==
Best Film

- Tony Leung Ka-fai

Best Director

- Peter Chan

Best Screenplay

- Kam Kwok-leung

Best Actor

- Sandra Ng
- Carina Lau

Best Actress

- Anthony Wong

Best Supporting Actor

- Andy Lau

Best Supporting Actress

- Shawn Yue
- Gao Yuanyuan

Best Cinematography, Best Film Editing

- Julian Cheung
- Shu Qi

Best Art Direction, Best Costume and Makeup Design

- Philip Chan
- John Shum

Best Action Choreography

- Chin Kar-lok
- Kara Hui

Best Sound Design, Best Visual Effects

- Pang Ho-cheung
- Yang Mi

Best Original Film Score, Best Original Film Song

- Coco Lee

Best New Director

- Giddens Ko
- Michelle Chen
- Kai Ko

Best New Performer

- Jim Chim

Best Film of Mainland and Taiwan

- Hou Hsiao-hsien
- Ng See-yuen
- Li Siao-hung

Lifetime Achievement Award

- Tsui Hark

Professional Achievement Award

- Sammo Hung

== Films with awards and nominations ==
These films has received one nomination or more at the awards:

- 13 : Flying Swords of Dragon Gate, Let the Bullets Fly
- 12 : Wu Xia^{[a]}
- 9 : Overheard 2
- 8 : A Simple Life^{[b]}, Life without Principle
- 4 : Shaolin, White Vengeance
- 3 : A Beautiful Life, Mural
- 2 : Don’t Go Breaking My Heart, Hi, Fidelity, The Sorcerer and the White Snake
- 1 : Cure, If You Are the One 2^{[c]}, Lan Kwai Fong, Magic to Win, Starry Starry Night^{[c]}, Big Blue Lake, The Flowers of War^{[c]}, The Killer Who Never Kills, Seediq Bale^{[c]}, You Are the Apple of My Eye^{[c]}

Note
a: Although Wu Xia receives 12 nominations, the categories it gets nominated are of acting or technical skills.
b: A Simple Life gets nominated in all major categories (film, director, screenplay, actor, actress, supporting actor, supporting actress, cinematography).
c: The tagged films are from mainland China or Taiwan so they can compete for only 1 award (Best Film of Mainland and Taiwan).
