= 6th Asian Film Awards =

2012 edition of award ceremony

- Date: March 19, 2012
- Site: Hong Kong Convention and Exhibition Center
- Hosted by: Angela Chow; Janet Hsieh

Highlights
- Best Film: Nader and Simin, A Separation
- Most awards: Nader and Simin, A Separation (4)
- Most nominations: The Flying Swords of Dragon Gate (8)

Television coverage
- Network: aTV World, aTV Asia
- Duration: 1 hour, 30 minutes

The 6th Asian Film Awards is an intra-continental annually-presented award ceremony hosted during the Hong Kong International Film Festival to honour the best Asian films of 2011.

Awards were presented in 14 general categories. People's Choice Awards were also presented for Favorite Actor and Favorite Actress. In addition, three special awards were also given, the Lifetime Achievement Award, The Edward Yang New Talent Award and The Asian Film Award for 2011's Top Grossing Asian Film. Nominations were announced on January 17, 2012 and the ceremony took place on March 19, 2012.

The awards were held at the Grand Hall of the Hong Kong Convention and Exhibition Center as part of the Entertainment Expo's Opening Gala. It was broadcast in aTV World on March 20 and in aTV Asia on March 22.

== Jury ==
The jury for the awards consisted of 12 members from various countries; filmmakers, producers, critics and delegates from other international film festivals were a part of the jury.

- **Eric Khoo** (Singapore)
- Ronald Arguelles (Philippines)
- John Badalu (Indonesia)
- Peggy Chiao (Taiwan)
- Ishizaka Kenji (Japan)
- Christian Jeune (France)
- Kong Rithdee (Thailand)
- Christoph Terhechte (Germany)
- Jacob Wong (Hong Kong)
- Patricia Cheng (Hong Kong)
- Cho Young-Chung (South Korea)
- Xie Fei (China)

Legend
Bold - Jury President; Italics - delegate from film festivals such as Cannes Film Festival, Busan International Film Festival, Berlinale and Tokyo International Film Festival

== Winners and nominees ==
Winners are listed first and highlighted in bold.

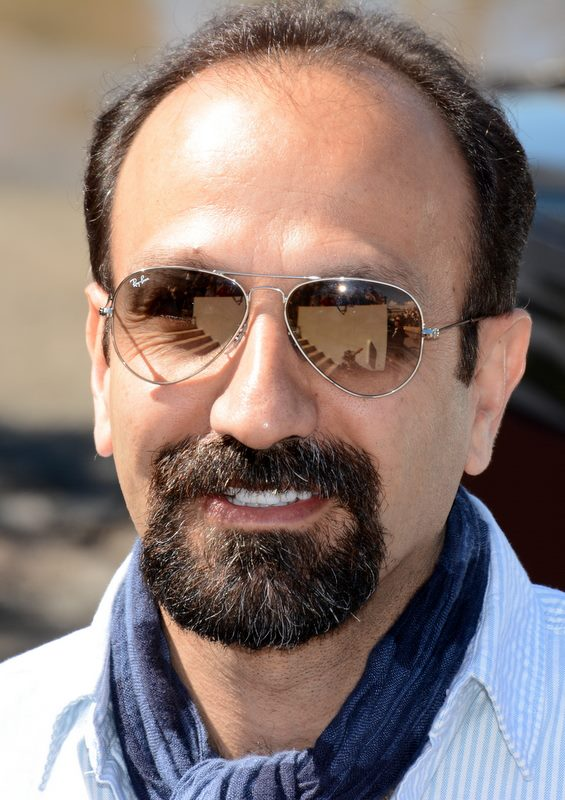
Asghar Farhadi, winner of Best Director

Best Film	Best Director
**Nader and Simin, A Separation (Iran)**; Postcard (Japan); The Flowers of War (China); The Flying Swords of Dragon Gate (Hong Kong) / (China); Seediq Bale (Taiwan); You Don't Get Life a Second Time (India)	**Asghar Farhadi – Nader and Simin, A Separation (Iran)**; Teddy Soeriaatmadja – Lovely Man (Indonesia); Sono Sion – Guilty of Romance (Japan); Tsui Hark – The Flying Swords of Dragon Gate (Hong Kong) / (China); Wei Te-sheng – Seediq Bale (Taiwan); Zhang Yimou – The Flowers of War (China)
Best Actor	Best Actress
**Donny Damara – Lovely Man (Indonesia)**; Chen Kun – The Flying Swords of Dragon Gate (Hong Kong) / (China); Andy Lau – A Simple Life (Hong Kong); Park Hae-il – War of the Arrows (South Korea); Yakusho Koji – Chronicle of My Mother (Japan)	**Deanie Ip – A Simple Life (Hong Kong)**; Vidya Balan – The Dirty Picture (India); Michelle Chen – You Are the Apple of My Eye (Taiwan); Eugene Domingo – The Woman in the Septic Tank (Philippines); Leila Hatami – Nader and Simin, A Separation (Iran)
Best Supporting Actor	Best Supporting Actress
**Lawrence Ko – Jump Ashin! (Taiwan)**; Umin Boya – Seediq Bale (Taiwan); Lee Je-hoon – The Front Line (South Korea); Mario Maurer – The Outrage (Thailand)	**Shamaine Buencamino – Niño (Philippines)**; Gwei Lun-mei – The Flying Swords of Dragon Gate (Hong Kong) / (China); Cris Horwang – Headshot (Thailand); Mitsushima Hikari – Hara-Kiri: Death of a Samurai (Japan); Yan Ni – 11 Flowers (China) / (France)
Best Newcomer	Best Screenwriter
**Ni Ni – The Flowers of War (China)**; Ko Chen-tung – You Are the Apple of My Eye (Taiwan); Eric Lin Hui-min – Starry Starry Night (Taiwan) / (China) / (Hong Kong); Maeda Ohshiro – I Wish (Japan); Gita Novalista – The Mirror Never Lies (Indonesia)	**Asghar Farhadi – Nader and Simin, A Separation (Iran)**; Shindô Kaneto – Postcard (Japan); Liu Heng, Yan Geling – The Flowers of War (China); Alan Mak, Felix Chong – Overheard 2 (Hong Kong); Chris Martinez – The Woman in the Septic Tank (Philippines)
Best Cinematographer	Best Production Designer
**Jake Pollock, Lai Yiu-fai – Wu Xia (China) / (Hong Kong)**; Chin Ting-chan – Seediq Bale (Taiwan); Vishwajit Karunarathna – Flying Fish (Sri Lanka); Kim Woo-hyung – The Front Line (South Korea); Rachmat Syaiful – The Mirror Never Lies (Indonesia)	**Yee Chung-Man, Sun Li – Wu Xia (China) / (Hong Kong)**; Suzanne Caplan Merwanji – You Don't Get Life a Second Time (India); Ryu Seong-hie – The Front Line (South Korea); Taneda Yohei – Seediq Bale (Taiwan); Yee Chung-Man, Ben Lau – The Flying Swords of Dragon Gate (Hong Kong) / (China)
Best Composer	Best Editor
**Chan Kwong-wing, Peter Kam, Chatchai Pongprapaphan – Wu Xia (China) / (Hong Kong)**; Chen Qigang – The Flowers of War (China); Ricky Ho – Seediq Bale (Taiwan); A.R. Rahman – Rockstar (India); Sakamoto Ryuichi – Hara-Kiri: Death of a Samurai (Japan)	**Hayedeh Safiyari – Nader and Simin, A Separation (Iran)**; Curran Pang – Overheard 2 (Hong Kong); Nelly Quettier – 11 Flowers (China) / (France); Anand Subaya – You Don't Get Life a Second Time (India); Tang man-to – White Vengeance (China) / (Hong Kong)
Best Visual Effects	Best Costume Designer
**Wook Kim, Josh Cole, Frankie Chung – The Flying Swords of Dragon Gate (Hong Kong) / (China)**; Haresh Hingorani, Keitan Yadav – Ra.One (India); Kamiya Makoto – Gantz (Japan); Xiao Yang, Chang Song, A Law, Li Ming-hsung, Li Jin-hui – Starry Starry Night (Taiwan) / (China) / (Hong Kong); **Yung Kwok-yin, Andy Kang – Wu Xia (China) / (Hong Kong)**	**Yee Chung-Man, Lai Hsuan-wu – The Flying Swords of Dragon Gate (Hong Kong) / (China)**; Amano Kyoko, Emura Kouichi – Milocrorze: A Love Story (Japan); William Chang Suk-ping – The Flowers of War (China); Mok Kwan-kit, Wong Ming-ha – White Vengeance (China) / (Hong Kong); Noppadol Techo – The Outrage (Thailand)

=== People's Choice Awards ===
Favorite Actor	Favorite Actress
**Andy Lau – A Simple Life (Hong Kong)**; Chen Kun – The Flying Swords of Dragon Gate (Hong Kong) / (China); Donny Damara – Lovely Man (Indonesia); Park Hae-il – War of the Arrows (South Korea); Yakusho Koji – Chronicle of My Mother (Japan)	**Eugene Domingo – The Woman in the Septic Tank (Philippines)**; Vidya Balan – The Dirty Picture (India); Michelle Chen – You Are the Apple of My Eye (Taiwan); Leila Hatami – Nader and Simin, A Separation (Iran); Deanie Ip – A Simple Life (Hong Kong)

=== Special awards ===
Lifetime Achievement Award

- Ann Hui (Hong Kong)

The Edward Yang New Talent Award

- Edwin (Indonesia)

The Asian Film Award for 2011's Top Grossing Asian Film

- Let the Bullets Fly (China) / (Hong Kong)

== Films with multiple awards and nominations ==
Multiple awards

These films won more than one award at the ceremony :

- **Four** : Nader and Simin, A Separation
- **Three** : Wu Xia
- **Two** : A Simple Life, The Flying Swords of Dragon Gate

Multiple nominations

These films received more than one nomination at the awards :

- **Eight** : The Flying Swords of Dragon Gate
- **Six** : Nader and Simin, A Separation, The Flowers of War, Seediq Bale
- **Four** : A Simple Life, Wu Xia
- **Three** : Lovely Man, The Front Line, The Woman in the Septic Tank, You Are the Apple of My Eye, You Don't Get Life a Second Time,
- **Two** : 11 Flowers, Chronicle of My Mother, Hara-Kiri: Death of a Samurai, Overheard 2, Postcard, Starry Starry Night, The Dirty Picture, The Mirror Never Lies, The Outrage, War of the Arrows, White Vengeance

== Nations who received awards and nominations ==
Awards

The awards tally includes People's Choice Awards and special awards.

Nation	Number of awards
Hong Kong	9^{[c]}
Mainland China^{[a]}	7^{[c]}
Iran	4
Indonesia	2
Philippines	2
Taiwan^{[b]}	1

Nominations

The nominations tally includes People's Choice Awards nominations.

Nation	Number of nominations
Mainland China^{[a]}	24^{[d]}
Hong Kong	22^{[e]}
Taiwan^{[b]}	12^{[f]}
Japan	10
India	7
Iran	6
Indonesia	5
South Korea	5
Philippines	4
Thailand	3
France^{[g]}	2
Sri Lanka	1

Notes
a: The term "Mainland China" was used to refer to the People's Republic of China.
b: The term "Taiwan" was used to refer to the Republic of China.
c: 6 awards are shared between Hong Kong and Mainland China.
d: 18 nominations are shared with Hong Kong, France and Taiwan.
e: 16 nominations are shared with China and Taiwan.
f: 2 nominations are shared with China and Hong Kong.
g: France was included because of the co-production with China for the film, 11 Flowers, thus sharing 2 nominations with China.

== Performers ==
- Khalil Fong — "Johnny B. Goode"
- Joanna Wang — "Apathy"
- GACKT — "Ghost"

== Presenters ==
- Jia Zhangke & Josie Ho — presented Best Screenwriter
- Gwei Lun-mei & Wing Shya — presented Best Cinematographer
- Vivienne Tam & Shawn Yue — presented the Best Costume Designer
- Donny Damara & Daniel Lee — presented Best Production Designer
- Michelle Chen, Ko Chen-tung & Giddens Ko — presented Best Composer
- Lee Chang-dong — presented The Edward Yang New Talent Award
- Chen Daming & Zhang Jingchu — presented Best Visual Effects
- Umin Boya & Mario Maurer — presented Best Editor
- Wilfred Wong — presented People's Choice Awards for Favorite Actor & Favorite Actress
- Ng See-yuen — presented The Asian Film Award for 2011's Top Grossing Asian Film
- Andy Lau & Yoon Eun-hye — presented Best Newcomer
- Eugene Domingo & Qin Hailu — presented Best Supporting Actor
- Ananda Everingham & Karina — presented Best Supporting Actress
- Sylvia Chang & Deanie Ip — presented Lifetime Achievement Award
- Karen Mok & Joe Odagiri — presented Best Actor
- Gu Changwei & Xu Fan — presented Best Actress
- Lee Lieh & Lu Chuan — presented Best Director
- Eric Khoo & Siqin Gaowa — presented Best Film
