= Aaron Kwok discography =

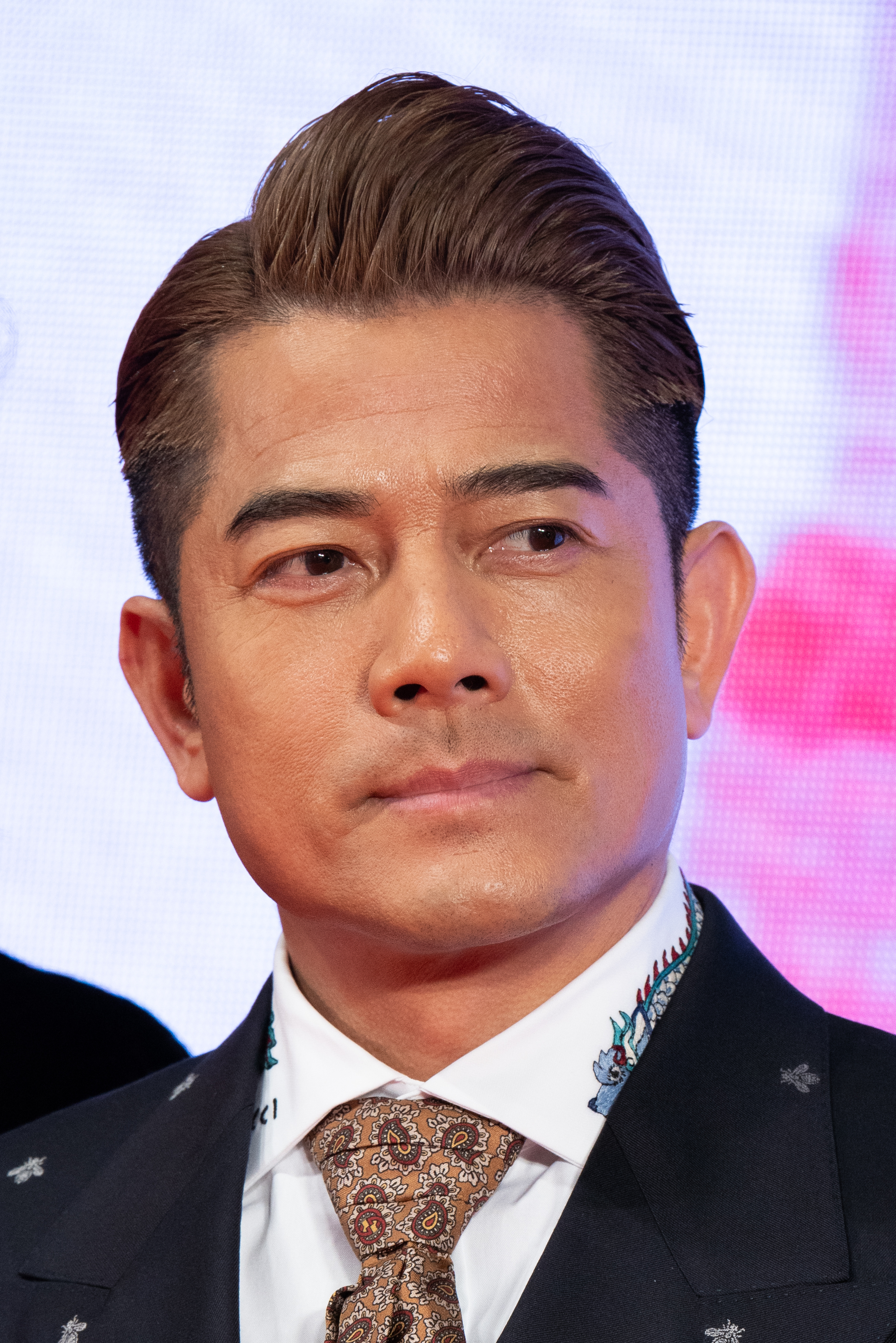
- Kwok in 2019
- Studio albums: 34
- EPs: 3
- Compilation albums: 11+

The discography of Hong Kong recording artist Aaron Kwok (Chinese: 郭富城) consists of 34 studio albums, including 17 recorded in Mandarin and 17 recorded in Cantonese. Kwok released his debut solo album I Love You Forever in September 1990, which went on to sell over 1 million copies throughout Asia. Kwok released his first Cantonese album in August 1992, titled Endless Dancing, Loving, Singing. Over eleven of his records have reached the number one position on the IFPI Hong Kong album chart.

== Studio albums ==
=== Mandarin albums ===
Title	Album details	Peak chart positions		Sales	Certifications
Title	Album details	HK	TWN	Sales	Certifications
I Love You Forever (对你爱不完)	Released: 24 September 1990; Label: UFO Records	—	—	Asia: 1,000,000	
Should I Walk Away Quietly? (我是不是该安静的走开)	Released: 8 April 1991; Label: UFO Records	—	—		
Who Can Tell Me Anyway (到底有谁能够告诉我)	Released: 15 October 1991; Label: UFO Records	—	—		
Loving You (爱你)	Released: 17 July 1992; Label: UFO Records	—	—		
Leaving All My Love to You (把所有的爱都留给你)	Released: 3 December 1992; Label: UFO Records	—	—		
Dream Can't Be Kept (梦难留)	Released: 10 November 1993; Label: UFO Records	—	—		
Mèng de Jìntóu, Jiùshì Tiānyá (梦的尽头, 就是天涯)	Released: 9 February 1994; Label: UFO Records	—	—	TWN: 250,000	
Desire (渴望)	Released: 22 July 1994; Label: UFO Records	—	—		
Here Is My Beginning (我的开始在这里)	Released: 2 January 1995; Label: UFO Records	—	—		
The Wind Is Blowing (风不息)	Released: August 1995; Label: Warner Records	4	—		
Love Dove (信鸽)	Released: May 1996; Label: UFO, Warner Records	4	—		
Who Will Remember Me (谁会记得我)	Released: 7 April 1997; Label: Warner Records	—	9		IFPI HK: Gold
Devoted (爱定你)	Released: October 1997; Label: Warner Records	1	14		IFPI HK: Gold
So Afraid (真的怕了)	Released: October 1999; Label: Warner Records	4	—		
Journey. Cheer (旅途·愉快)	Released: 18 April 2000; Label: Warner Records	7	—		
My Nation	Released: 12 December 2006; Label: Music Nation	—	—		
Never Ending Love (永远爱不完)	Released: 23 December 2010; Label: Music Nation	—	—		

=== Cantonese albums ===
Title	Album details	Peak chart positions	Sales	Certifications
Title	Album details	HK	Sales	Certifications
Endless Dancing, Loving, Singing (跳不完·爱不完·唱不完)	Released: 1 August 1992; Label: Capital Artists	—	HK: 300,000	IFPI HK: 6× Platinum
Without Your Love (没有你的爱)	Released: 27 April 1993; Label: Capital Artists	1	HK: 250,000	IFPI HK: 5× Platinum
Merry X'mas	Released: December 1993; Label: Capital Artists	4		
The Wild City (狂野之城)	Released: 24 January 1994; Label: Warner Music	1	HK: 150,000	IFPI HK: 3× Platinum
Starring in the World's End (天若有情II天涯凝望)	Released: 24 May 1994; Label: Warner Music	2		
Iron Curtain Temptation (铁幕诱惑)	Released: 20 September 1994; Label: Warner Music	1		
Pure Legend (纯真传说)	Released: 29 May 1995; Label: Warner Music	1		
Memorandum (备忘录)	Released: December 1995; Label: Warner Music	3		
Listen to the Wind's Song (听风的歌)	Released: 7 October 1996; Label: Warner Music	1		IFPI HK: Platinum
Love Summons (爱的呼唤)	Released: 26 June 1997; Label: Warner Music	1	HK: 150,000	IFPI HK: 3× Platinum
Sing This Song (唱这歌)	Released: 1 December 1997; Label: Warner Music, UFO Records	1		IFPI HK: Platinum
In the Wind (风里密码)	Released: 23 June 1998; Label: Warner Music	1		
A Magic to City (一变倾城)	Released October 1998; Label: Warner Music	1		
Amazing Dream (游园惊梦)	Released: August 1999; Label: Warner Music	3		
Fascinating (著迷)	Released: 6 September 2000; Label: Warner Music	—		
New World (新天地)	Released: 27 July 2001; Label: Warner Music	—		
In the Still of the Night	Released: 29 August 2003; Label: Warner Music	—		

== Compilation albums ==
Title	Album details	Peak chart positions	Certifications
Title	Album details	HK	Certifications
Please Take My Feelings With You (请把我的情感带回家)	Released: 25 February 1992; Label: Capital Artists	—	IFPI HK: 6× Platinum
Deeper in Love (深深爱你的)	Released: 3 December 1992; Label: UFO Records	—	
Starting From Zero (由零开始)	Released: 1 December 1993; Label: Capital Artists	—	
Lover For Life (一生的情人)	Released: 25 January 1994; Label: Capital Artists	—	
AK-47	Released: March 1994; Label: Capital Artists	—	
Aaron Kwok 24K Mastersonic Compilation	Released: 1997; Label: Warner Music	—	IFPI HK: Gold
Aaron Kwok 24K Mastersonic Compilation, Vol. II	Released: 1997; Label: Warner Music	1	IFPI HK: Gold
Hip Hip Hurray (Greatest Hits 1999) (郭富城新舊喝采16首1999)	Released: December 1999; Label: Warner Music	2	
Aaron Kwok Nicam Greatest Hits 2002	Released: October 2002; Label: Warner Music	—	
Aaron's AA+ Best Hits!	Released: 2002; Label: Warner Music	—	
AK Trilogy: Yours Truly Greatest Hits (城意三部曲)	Released: 28 July 2004; Label: Warner Music	—	
Aaron Kwok: The Best Collection	Released: 12 December 2006; Label: Warner Music	—	
Aaron Kwok Greatest Hits	Released: 27 November 2009; Label: Warner Music	—	

== Extended plays ==
Title	Album details	Peak chart positions
Title	Album details	HK
You Are My Everything (妳是我的一切)	Released: March 1995; Label: Warner Music	4
The Most Exciting Empire (最激帝国)	Released: August 1996; Label: Warner Music	2
Ask For More	Released: May 1999; Label: Warner Music	1
