= Andy Lau discography =

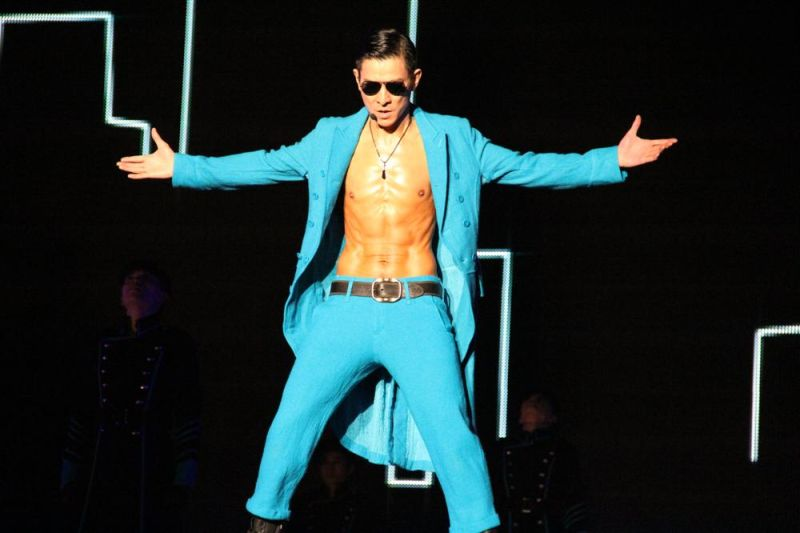
- Lau performing in 2011
- Studio albums: 49
- Extended plays: 2
- Live albums: 7
- Compilation albums: 6

This is the discography of Hong Kong recording artist Andy Lau. He has released 49 studio albums, including 21 in Mandarin, and 28 in Cantonese. He has additionally released over six compilation albums and seven live albums. He made his debut with the Cantonese album Just Know I Only Love You in May 1985.

Lau has sold over 48 million albums throughout his career. His Mandarin studio album Forget Love Potion (1994) went on to sell over 3.8 million copies throughout Asia, including over 1.2 million copies in Taiwan, making it one of the best-selling albums in the country.

== Studio albums ==
=== Cantonese albums ===
Title	Album details	Peak chart positions		Sales	Certifications
Title	Album details	HK	TWN	Sales	Certifications
Just Know I Only Love You (只知道此刻愛你)	Released: 29 May 1985; Label: Capital Artists	—	—		
Emotionally Restricted (情感的禁區)	Released: 21 April 1987; Label: EMI Music	—	—		IFPI HK: Gold
Back for You (回到你身邊)	Released: February 1989; Label: EMI Music	—	—		
Andy Lau (劉德華)	Released: 23 May 1989; Label: EMI Music	—	—		
Cannot – Who Said No? (可不可以 – 誰說不可以)	Released: 18 May 1990; Label: PolyGram Hong Kong	—	—		
Farewell (再會了)	Released: 19 December 1990; Label: PolyGram Hong Kong	—	—		
Neverending Love (愛不完)	Released: June 1991; Label: PolyGram Hong Kong	—	—		
The Days We Passed Together (一起走過的日子)	Released: September 1991; Label: PolyGram Hong Kong	—	—		
Unbelievable...On Edge (不可不信......緣)	Released: December 1991; Label: PolyGram Hong Kong	—	—		
Love and Space (愛的空間)	Released: 12 July 1992; Label: PolyGram Hong Kong	—	—		
Real My Style (真我的風采)	Released: December 1992; Label: Warner Music	—	—	HK: 400,000	IFPI HK: 8× Platinum
The Answer is You (答案就是你)	Released: 8 July 1993; Label: Warner Music	—	—		
Falling in Love (爱意)	Released: 23 December 1993; Label: Warner Music, New Melody	1	—		
5:30 (五时三十分)	Released: 18 August 1994; Label: Warner Music	5	—		
A Bird Searching for Love (情未鸟)	Released: 5 December 1995; Label: Warner Music	3	—		
Because I Care (在乎您)	Released: August 1996; Label: BMG Music	1	12		
Nature Peaceful Roots (真生命)	Released: 1 September 1997; Label: BMG Music	1	—		
Be My Lady (你是我的女人)	Released: 3 July 1998; Label: BMG Music	1	1	TWN: 155,000	RIT: Gold
Naive Love (爱无知)	Released: November 1999; Label: BMG Music	1	—		
Heart's Blue (心蓝)	Released: December 2000; Label: BMG Music	—	—		
If One Day (如果有一天)	Released: 5 June 2003; Label: Catchy Entertainment	—	—		
Coffee or Tea	Released: 18 August 2004; Label: Catchy Entertainment	—	—		
Voice (声音)	Released: 8 August 2006; Label: Focus Music	—	—		
Hope Love（希望·爱）	Released: 13 February 2009; Label: Focus Music	—	13		
Long Distance Companion (长途伴侣)	Released: 24 July 2009; Label: Focus Music	—	—		
Unforgettable (忘不了的)	Released: 13 October 2010; Label: Focus Music	—	—		
Performing and Singing (演·唱)	Released: 15 December 2020; Label: Focus Music; Formats: Digital download, streaming	—	—		

=== Mandarin albums ===
Title	Album details	Peak chart positions		Sales	Certifications
Title	Album details	HK	TWN	Sales	Certifications
In a Dream – Connection of Love (在夢裡 – 愛的連線)	Released: 26 October 1989; Label: Coden Records	—	—		
If You Are My Legend (如果你是我的傳說)	Released: May 1990; Label: PolyGram Hong Kong	—	—		
Chasing My Dream (我和我追逐的夢)	Released: 12 June 1991; Label: PolyGram Hong Kong	—	—		
Edge of the Next Life (來生緣)	Released: 9 December 1991; Label: PolyGram Hong Kong	—	—		
Thank You For Your Love (謝謝你的愛)	Released: 22 July 1992; Label: PolyGram Hong Kong	—	—		
True Love is Hard to Reach (真情難收)	Released: 1 March 1993; Label: UFO Record	—	—		
I'd Rather Be Sad-Once In A Lifetime (寧願我傷心 – 一生一次)	Released: 2 September 1993; Label: UFO Record	—	—		
Forget Love Potion (忘情水)	Released: 30 April 1994; Label: UFO Record	6	—	Asia: 3,800,000; TWN: 1,200,000	
Fate (God's Will) (天意)	Released: 25 November 1994; Label: UFO Record	1	—	TWN: 750,000	
Real Forever (真永遠)	Released: 25 August 1995; Label: UFO Record	1	—		
Lovesickness (相思成災)	Released: 1 May 1996; Label: BMG Music	4	—		
Because of Love (因為愛)	Released: 19 November 1996; Label: BMG Music	6	1	TWN: 404,000	RIT: 2× Platinum
Love is a Miracle (愛如此神奇)	Released: April 1997; Label: BMG Music	1	2	TWN: 414,000	RIT: 2× Platinum
Love is Unforgettable (愛在刻骨銘心時)	Released: December 1997; Label: BMG Music	7	1	TWN: 691,000	RIT: 2× Platinum+Gold
Human Love (人間愛)	Released: 1 May 1999; Label: BMG Music	2	1		
Men's Love (男人的愛)	Released: 1 August 2000; Label: BMG Music	—	—		
Daybreak (天開了)	Released: 5 June 2001; Label: BMG Music	—	—		
A Better Day (美麗的一天)	Released: 11 July 2002; Label: Catchy Entertainment	—	—		
All About Love (再說一次‧我愛你)	Released: 4 August 2005; Label: Focus Music	—	—		
Miracle World (一隻牛的異想世界)	Released: 18 July 2007; Label: Focus Music	—	4		

== Compilation albums ==
Title	Album details	Peak chart positions		Sales	Certifications
Title	Album details	HK	TWN	Sales	Certifications
Stupid Fellow Mandarin Collection 1993–1998 (笨小孩国语精选 1993–1998)	Released: November 1998; Label: BMG Music	1	1	TWN: 346,000	RIT: Platinum+Gold
Home Sweet Home (New+Best Selection) (回家真好 (新曲+精选))	Released: February 1999; Label: BMG Music	1	—		
The Best Songs From Andy (劉德華唱作俱佳作品集)	Released: October 2000; Label: BMG Music	—	—		
The Melody Andy Vol. 8	Released: January 2001; Label: BMG Music	—	—		
Best of My Love (New+Best Selection) (继续谈情 (新曲+精选))	Released: 13 December 2005; Label: Focus Music	—	11		
Everyone Is No. 1	Released: 5 December 2007; Label: Focus Music	—	9		

== Live albums ==
Title	Album details
Andy Lau in Concert 96 Live	Released: November 1996; Label: BMG Music
Andy Lau in Concert 99	Released: 1999; Label: BMG Music
Andy Lau in Concert 2001	Released: 2001; Label: Avex Trax
Proud of You Andy Lau in Concert	Released: 2002; Label: Catchy Entertainment
Andy Lau Vision Tour 2004	Released: 2004; Label: Catchy Entertainment
Andy Lau Wonderful World Concert Tour 2007 Hong Kong	Released: 2008; Label: Focus Music
Andy Lau Wonderful World Concert Tour Shanghai	Released: 2008; Label: Focus Music

== Extended plays ==
Title	Album details	Peak chart positions
Title	Album details	HK
Just For You	Released: May 2000; Label: New Melody, BMG Music	4
Horizon Focus (照點時空)	Released: 2000; Label: BMG Music	—
Fiesta (夏日)	Released: 2002; Label: BMG Music	—
