= A Simple Life =

2011 Hong Kong film by Ann Hui

- Original Hong Kong film poster
- Directed by: Ann Hui
- Screenplay by: Susan Chan; Roger Lee
- Story by: Roger Lee
- Produced by: Roger Lee; Ann Hui; Jessica Chan
- Starring: Andy Lau; Deanie Ip
- Cinematography: Yu Lik-wai
- Edited by: Kwong Chi-leung; Manda Wai
- Music by: Law Wing-fai
- Production companies: Focus Films Limited; Sil-Metropole Organisation; Bona Film Group
- Distributed by: Distribution Workshop
- Release dates: 5 September 2011 (Venice); 8 March 2012 (China); 9 March 2012 (Hong Kong)
- Running time: 118 minutes
- Countries: Hong Kong; China
- Language: Cantonese
- Budget: ¥30 million (US$5.4 million)
- Box office: US$6,202,317

A Simple Life (Chinese: 桃姐; Jyutping: Tou4 Ze2), also known as Sister Peach, is a 2011 Hong Kong drama film directed by Ann Hui and starring Andy Lau and Deanie Ip. Ip, in the lead role of Sister Peach, won the Best Actress Award at the 68th Venice International Film Festival. Originally, Hui considered retiring after making this film. However, due to the film's success, she changed her mind and went on to work on other projects.

Lau and Ip had not worked together since 1999's Prince Charming. Production of the film officially began during Chinese New Year. It was filmed in Mei Foo Sun Chuen. Production was wrapped on 6 April 2011 after two months of filming. The film competed in the 68th Venice International Film Festival. It was also selected as the Hong Kong entry for the Best Foreign Language Film at the 84th Academy Awards, but it did not make the final shortlist. A Simple Life was an official selection for competition at the 68th Venice International Film Festival, where it won 4 awards. Deanie Ip won the Volpi Cup for Best Actress for her role in this film. She is the first Hong Konger to win this prize. In March, she also became the first Hong Konger to win the Asian Film Award for Best Actress. At the same event, director Ann Hui became the first woman to win the Lifetime Achievement Award. At the 31st Hong Kong Film Awards Ceremony, A Simple Life won five major prizes (film, director, screenplay, actor, actress), repeating what happened with Hui's Summer Snow in 1996. Ann Hui has won Best Director (four times) more than anyone else at the Hong Kong Film Awards.

== Plot ==
Roger Leung, an unmarried middle aged Hong Kong film producer, lives with Chung Chun-to, a maidservant who has worked for his family for decades. Returning home after a business trip, Roger discovers Chung on the floor and calls for an ambulance. At the hospital, Roger discovers that Chung has had a stroke but rather than ask for rehabilitation, Chung decides she wants to retire and asks to be put in a nursing home. While looking for a nursing home, Roger discovers one nearby that is owned by his friend. He installs Chung there and visits her in between his production jobs. While visiting Chung, he tells her friends and neighbours that he is her godson in order to explain their connection.

Visiting Chung in the nursing home allows Roger to become closer to her. Eventually, other members of his family, who mostly live abroad, come to visit her. Roger's mother proposes that they renovate an old apartment that the family owns and allow Chung to spend the remainder of her days there. However, Chung grows more sickly and suffers a second stroke causing her condition to deteriorate and nullifying the family's plans for her.

Eventually, Chung is hospitalized a final time and Roger makes the decision to allow her to die. At her funeral, the members of Roger's family pay their respects to her and while Roger delivers the eulogy, a man from the nursing home comes to give her flowers.

== Production ==
Producer Roger Lee began writing loose fragments together and showed them to director Ann Hui. She persuaded him it was enough for a screenplay and encouraged him through his writing process.

Andy Lau and Deanie Ip were chosen in part because of their close relationship to one another as Ip is Lau's godmother and had already played his mother in several films.

== Cast ==
- Andy Lau as Roger Leung (梁羅傑), a film producer
- Deanie Ip as Sister Peach / Chung Chun-to (桃姐/鍾春桃), a servant
- Wang Fuli as Roger's mother
- Qin Hailu as Ms Choi (蔡姑娘), nursing home manager
- Paul Chun as Uncle Kin (堅叔) a resident at the nursing home
- Leung Tin as Headmaster (校長, a resident at the nursing home
- Yu Man-si as Sharon, Roger's older sister
- Eman Lam as Carmen. Roger's administrative assistant
- Hui Pik-kei as Aunt Kam(金姨), a resident at the nursing home
- Elena Kong as Aunt Kam's daughter
- Jason Chan as Jason, Roger's nephew
- Ho So-ying as Aunt Mui (梅姑), a resident at the nursing home

=== Cameos ===
- Anthony Wong as Grasshopper (草蜢), care home owner and Roger's old friend
- Chapman To as a dentist
- Raymond Chow as himself, one of the guests at film premiere
- Yu Dong as himself
- Sammo Hung as himself
- Tsui Hark as himself
- Francis Mak as one of Roger's old classmates
- Lawrence Lau as one of Roger's old classmates
- Dennis Chan as Vincent
- Ning Hao as himself, one of the guests at film premiere
- Lam Yee-nok as himself, the pastor at To's funeral
- Gordon Lam as himself, one of the guests at film premiere
- Law Lan as herself, one of the guests at film premiere
- Jim Chim as one of Roger's old classmates
- Tam Ping-man as himself, a visitor of the nursing home
- Eva Lai as himself, a visitor of the nursing home
- Kung Suet-fa as the nursing home receptionist
- Queenie Chu as the receptionist at investment bank
- Tyson Chak as Air-con fixer at investment bank
- Hiromi Wada as visiting singer of the nursing home
- Angelababy as herself, one of the guests at film premiere
- John Shum as himself, one of the guests at film premiere
- Stanley Kwan as himself, one of the guests at film premiere
- Andrew Lau as himself, one of the guests at film premiere

== Box office ==
In China, after being shown for only four days, the film made US$5.2 million and reached second place in the top gross film of the week ending 11 March 2012.

== Critical reception ==
Roger Ebert gave the film 4 stars. He wrote, "It expresses hope in human nature. It is one of the year's best films." Hollywood Reporter's Neil Young wrote that "Film festivals looking for undemanding crowd-pleasers will want to check it out, even at its currently excessive 118-minute running time – much too long for what is indeed a pretty "simple" affair." Variety's Justin Chang commented: "Fittingly for a film about the challenges and rewards of looking after the sick and aging, this well-observed, pleasantly meandering dramedy requires a measure of patience, and some judicious trimming would improve its chances for export. But the moving, never tearjerking lead performances by Andy Lau and Deanie Ip are strong selling points for Hui's following at home and abroad."

=== Top ten lists ===
The film has appeared on the following critics' top ten lists for the best films of 2012:

Critic	Publication	Rank
Roger Ebert	Chicago Sun-Times	10th

== Awards and nominations ==
Award / Film Festival	Category	Recipient(s)	Result
68th Venice International Film Festival	Golden Lion	Ann Hui	Nominated
68th Venice International Film Festival	Volpi Cup for Best Actress	Deanie Ip	Won
68th Venice International Film Festival	Equal Opportunities Award	Ann Hui	Won
68th Venice International Film Festival	Signis Award – Honorable Mention	Ann Hui	Won
68th Venice International Film Festival	La Navicella Award	Ann Hui	Won
48th Golden Horse Awards	Best Film	Focus Films Limited, Sil-Metropole Organisation, Bona Film Group	Nominated
48th Golden Horse Awards	Best Director	Ann Hui	Won
48th Golden Horse Awards	Best Leading Actor	Andy Lau	Won
48th Golden Horse Awards	Best Leading Actress	Deanie Ip	Won
48th Golden Horse Awards	Best Original Screenplay	Susan Chan	Nominated
48th Golden Horse Awards	Best Film Editing	Kwong Chi-leung, Manda Wai	Nominated
15th Tallinn Black Nights Film Festival – Official Competition EurAsia Jury Awards	Grand Prix for Best Eurasian Film	Ann Hui	Won
15th Tallinn Black Nights Film Festival – Official Competition EurAsia Jury Awards	Jury Prize for the Best Actress	Deanie Ip	Won
15th Tallinn Black Nights Film Festival – Official Competition EurAsia Jury Awards	FICC Awards	Ann Hui	Won
18th Hong Kong Film Critics Society Awards	Best Film	Roger Lee	Won
18th Hong Kong Film Critics Society Awards	Best Director	Ann Hui	Nominated
18th Hong Kong Film Critics Society Awards	Best Screenplay	Susan Chan	Nominated
18th Hong Kong Film Critics Society Awards	Best Actress	Deanie Ip	Won
2011 Hong Kong Film Directors' Guild Awards	Most Recommended Film of the Year	A Simple Life (with Let the Bullets Fly, Overheard 2)	Won
2011 Hong Kong Film Directors' Guild Awards	Most Outstanding Director of the Year	Ann Hui (with Jiang Wen, Tsui Hark)	Won
2011 Hong Kong Film Directors' Guild Awards	Special Honour Award	Ann Hui	Won
6th Asian Film Awards	Best Actor	Andy Lau	Nominated
6th Asian Film Awards	Best Actress	Deanie Ip	Won
6th Asian Film Awards	People's Choice for Favorite Actor	Andy Lau	Won
6th Asian Film Awards	People's Choice for Favorite Actress	Deanie Ip	Nominated
6th Asian Film Awards	Lifetime Achievement Award	Ann Hui	Won
4th Okinawa International Movie Festival	Peace Category: Uminchu Prize Grand Prix	Ann Hui	Won
4th Okinawa International Movie Festival	Jury Special Prize Golden SHISA Award	Ann Hui	Won
31st Hong Kong Film Awards	Best Film	Roger Lee, Ann Hui, Chan Pui-wah	Won
31st Hong Kong Film Awards	Best Director	Ann Hui	Won
31st Hong Kong Film Awards	Best Screenplay	Susan Chan	Won
31st Hong Kong Film Awards	Best Actor	Andy Lau	Won
31st Hong Kong Film Awards	Best Actress	Deanie Ip	Won
31st Hong Kong Film Awards	Best Supporting Actor	Paul Chun	Nominated
31st Hong Kong Film Awards	Best Supporting Actress	Qin Hailu	Nominated
31st Hong Kong Film Awards	Best Cinematography	Yu Lik-wai	Nominated
1st Hong Kong Salento International Film Festival	Salento Award	Deanie Ip	Won
12th Chinese Film Media Awards	Best Film	A Simple Life	Nominated
12th Chinese Film Media Awards	Best Director	Ann Hui	Nominated
12th Chinese Film Media Awards	Best Screenplay	Susan Chan	Nominated
12th Chinese Film Media Awards	Best Actor	Andy Lau	Nominated
12th Chinese Film Media Awards	Best Actress	Deanie Ip	Won
12th Chinese Film Media Awards	Film Honoured by 100 Medias in a Year	A Simple Life	Won
12th Chinese Film Media Awards	Filmmaker Honoured by 100 Medias in a Year	Ann Hui	Nominated
12th Chinese Film Media Awards	Filmmaker Honoured by 100 Medias in a Year	Andy Lau	Nominated
21st Shanghai Film Critics Award	Best 10 Chinese Films	A Simple Life (with other 9 films)	Won
21st Shanghai Film Critics Award	Best Director	Ann Hui	Won
10th Paris International Film Festival	Audience's Most Favorite Film	Ann Hui	Won
10th Paris International Film Festival	Best Film Selected by Students	Ann Hui	Won
9th International Women's Film Festival in Rehovot	Best Feature Film	Ann Hui	Won
33rd Durban International Film Festival	Best Actress Award	Deanie Ip	Won

== My 30 Work Days ==
The book, My 30 Work Days, was written by Andy Lau extracted from diaries and notes that he wrote while shooting the A Simple Life. The book contains Lau's 30 personal diaries and notes detailing his observations and thoughts about issues raised by the story of the film, in particular appreciation of and care for the elderly, along with 300 behind the scene photographs taken by Lau and his colleagues. The book was published on 27 February 2017 by Ming Pao Publications in Hong Kong.

== See also ==
- Andy Lau filmography
- List of submissions to the 84th Academy Awards for Best Foreign Language Film
- List of Hong Kong submissions for the Academy Award for Best Foreign Language Film
