= Jessey Tsang Tsui-Shan =

Hong Kong filmmaker

- 曾翠珊
- Born: Tsang Tsui-shan; Hong Kong
- Occupation: Film director

Chinese name
Transcriptions
Standard Mandarin
- Hanyu Pinyin: zēng cuì shān
Yue: Cantonese
- Jyutping: cang4 ceoi3 saan1

Jessey Tsang Tsui-shan (Chinese: 曾翠珊; Jyutping: cang4 ceoi3 saan1) is a Hong Kong film director, scriptwriter and documentary maker who has won multiple awards at various international film festivals. In 2012 she won a Hong Kong Film Award for Best New Director for her film Big Blue Lake.

== Biography ==
Tsang studied sound design at the Hong Kong Academy for Performing Arts where she graduated in 2001. Afterwards she attended the City University of Hong Kong and completed her master's degree in 2005. While still studying at City University she directed her first solo film Lonely Planet in 2004 which was honored with a Silver Award by the IFVA. After winning another award at the South Taiwan Film Festival in 2009 for Lovers on the Road Tsang directed her most critically acclaimed work to date Big Blue Lake which won her Best New Director at the 31st Hong Kong Film Awards and the title of Best New Artist by the Hong Kong Art Development Council. Tsang's work Flowing Stories is a documentary about the small rural village of Ho Chung in Sai Kung District where she grew up. Released in 2014 the film focuses on the lives of villagers and their relative that have left to live overseas. Tsang's another movie Scent is a romance movie filmed in China, featuring Korean actor Park Si-Hoo and Chinese actress Chen Ran. She received FilmAid Asia Humanitarian Award in 2016 for her projects on environmental issues and disadvantaged communities.

== Filmography ==
Year	Film	Chinese title	Notes
2008	Lovers on the Road	戀人路上	
2011	Big Blue Lake	大藍湖	Won - Hong Kong Film Award for Best New Director
2013	Summer Rain	冷雨盛夏	
2014	Flowing Stories	河上變村	
2014	Scent	香氣	
2019	The Lady Improper	非分熟女	
