= My 30 Work Days =

2012 book by Andy Lau

My 30 Work Days: Diary of Shooting A Simple Life
- Book cover
- Author: Andy Lau
- Original title: 我的30個工作天：《桃姐》拍攝日記
- Language: Chinese
- Genre: Diary, Prose, Photo-book
- Publisher: Ming Pao Publications
- Publication date: 27 February 2012
- Publication place: Hong Kong
- Media type: Print
- ISBN: 978-7-5113-2144-2

My 30 Work Days: : Diary of Shooting A Simple Life
- Traditional Chinese: 我的30個工作天：《桃姐》拍攝日記
- Simplified Chinese: 我的30个工作天：《桃姐》拍摄日记
Transcriptions
Yue: Cantonese
- Jyutping: Ngo2 Dik1 Saam1 Sap6 Go4 Gung1 Zok3 Tin1: Tou4 Ze2 Paak3 Sip3 Jat6 Gei3

My 30 Work Days: Diary of Shooting A Simple Life is a book published by Hong Kong actor and singer Andy Lau extracted from diaries and notes that he wrote while shooting the 2011 film, A Simple Life. Lau's 30 personal diaries and notes details his observations and thoughts about issues raised by the story of the film, in particular appreciation of and care for the elderly. The book also contains 300 behind the scene photographs taken by Lau and his colleagues. The book was published on 27 February 2012 by Ming Pao Publications in Hong Kong.

== Content ==
1. Thoughts and recommendations by cast and crew members of A Simple Life including director Ann Hui, producer Roger Lee and actresses Deanie Ip and Qin Hailu
2. Lau's 30 daily diary entries
3. Andy Lau exclusive photo collection
4. A Simple Life production stills
5. Decryption of the story of A Simple Life with photos and sections of the screenplay

=== Table of contents ===
1. Recommendations
2. Preface
3. Notes
4. Photographs
5. A Simple Life script excerpts

== Background ==
Lau's 30 personal entries were originally meant to be blog entries that he intended to share on his Andy World Club official fan club website. Lau also specifically stated the book is not written for his film, A Simple Life, nor is it a promotion for the film as he originally had no intention in publishing it. Instead, he only wanted to journal down his encounters while working on the film, and how the film influenced his feelings and emotions.
