= Flying Swords of Dragon Gate =

2011 Chinese-Hong Kong film by Tsui Hark

- Theatrical release poster
- simplified Chinese: 龙门飞甲; traditional Chinese: 龍門飛甲
- Directed by: Tsui Hark
- Screenplay by: Tsui Hark; Zhu Yali; Ho Kei-ping
- Story by: Tsui Hark
- Produced by: Nansun Shi; Tsui Hark
- Starring: Jet Li; Zhou Xun; Chen Kun; Li Yuchun; Gwei Lun-mei; Louis Fan; Mavis Fan
- Cinematography: Choi Sung-fai
- Edited by: Yau Chi-wai
- Music by: William Wu
- Production companies: Film Workshop; China Film Group Corporation; Shanghai Media Group; Polybona Films; Bona International Film Group; Liangzi Group; Shineshow Co.
- Distributed by: Distribution Workshop
- Release dates: 15 December 2011 (China); 22 December 2011 (Hong Kong)
- Running time: 125 minutes
- Countries: China; Hong Kong
- Language: Mandarin
- Budget: US$35 million
- Box office: US$100 million

Flying Swords of Dragon Gate (simplified Chinese: 龙门飞甲; traditional Chinese: 龍門飛甲) is a 2011 action wuxia film directed, co-written and co-produced by Tsui Hark, starring Jet Li, Zhou Xun, Chen Kun, Li Yuchun, Gwei Lun-mei, Louis Fan, and Mavis Fan. A Chinese-Hong Kong co-production, the film is a remake of Dragon Gate Inn (1967) and New Dragon Gate Inn (1992) but takes place three years after the original setting.

Filmed in 3-D from October 2010 to January 2011, Flying Swords of Dragon Gate was released in China on 16 December 2011 and in Hong Kong on 23 December, before was screened out of competition at the 62nd Berlin International Film Festival in February 2012. Received positive reviews from critics, it won two awards at the 2012 Asian Film Awards, won five at the 31st Hong Kong Film Awards, and won Best Visual Effects at the 49th Golden Horse Awards.

== Plot ==
In 1487, during the reign of the Ming dynasty's Emperor Xianzong, the imperial court suffered from political corruption and factionalism orchestrated by powerful eunuchs. Zhao Huai'an, a righteous swordsman, assassinated Wan Yulou – the corrupt head of the East Bureau – to punish tyrannical officials, triggering a relentless manhunt led by Yu Huatian, the ambitious commander of the West Bureau. Seeking to consolidate power, Huatian colluded with Royal Consort Wan to manipulate the inner court and eliminate pregnant palace concubines. Among them, a maid named Su Huirong fled the palace after conceiving the emperor's child and was rescued by Ling Yanqiu, a female warrior who assumed the identity of Zhao Huai'an. Yanqiu adopted this persona to reunite with Huai'an after a three-year separation, though Huai'an secretly shadowed her without revealing himself.

Huatian and a detachment of West Bureau forces pursued the fugitives toward the frontier. Along the way, Huai'an and his allies attempted to assassinate Huatian but failed, continuing to track the convoy covertly. Yanqiu brought Huirong to take refuge at the Dragon Gate Inn, where Tan Luzi and a group of undercover West Bureau agents were already stationed. A conflict broke out between the agents and a Tatar merchant caravan led by Chang Xiaowen, resulting in mutual poisoning. Soon after, the wandering martial artist Gu Shaotang and a con man named Bu Cangzhou – whose appearance bore an uncanny resemblance to Huatian – arrived at the inn. Recognizing the striking similarity, Luzi sent subordinates to locate Huatian's main army to verify Cangzhou's true identity.

While hiding in the inn's secret tunnels, Yanqiu discovered that Shaotang, Cangzhou, the innkeeper Liang Cai, and the Tatar merchants formed an alliance plotting to uncover a buried Western Xia treasure vault that emerged once every sixty years. When Luzi's subordinates returned with the identification passcode for Huatian, Huai'an intervened to warn the group that Cangzhou's deception had been exposed. Utilizing the acquired passcode, Cangzhou successfully impersonated Huatian, causing Luzi, Huatian's main army, and subordinate commander Ma Jinliang to mistake one another for enemies and engage in battle. This chaos enabled Huai'an and his factions to launch an assault, during which Jinliang was killed by Huai'an, and Yanqiu joined the fray to support the resistance.

As Huai'an and Huatian engaged in a duel, a massive sandstorm struck the desert, unearthing the long-lost Western Xia palace buried beneath the dunes. Both factions entered the ruins and temporarily suspended hostilities to loot the treasury. Suddenly, Huirong stabbed Yanqiu, revealing herself as an undercover spy working for the West Bureau; her initial escape had been a trap designed to draw Huai'an out. Following a brutal battle, Huirong was killed by Shaotang, while a wounded Huai'an created an opening for Yanqiu to kill Huatian. Unwilling to let Huai'an witness her passing, Yanqiu departed alone, leaving Huai'an to quickly follow in her footsteps. Meanwhile, Cangzhou maintained his disguise as Huatian and allied with Xiaowen to eliminate Consort Wan through poisoning, ultimately dismantling the eunuchs' political influence.

== Cast ==
- Jet Li as Zhao Huai'an
- Zhou Xun as Ling Yanqiu
- Chen Kun as Yu Huatian / Bu Cangzhou
- Li Yuchun as Gu Shaotang
- Gwei Lun-mei as Chang Xiaowen
- Louis Fan as Ma Jinliang
- Mavis Fan as Su Huirong
- Zha Ka (aka Han Feixing) as H'Gantga
- Wu Di as Zhao Tong
- Sun Jiankui as Liang Cai
- Li Yuan as Kuo Zheng
- Sheng Chien as Tan Luzi
- Gordon Liu as Wan Yulou
- Zhang Xinyu as Royal Consort Wan

== Production ==
Although this film is based on New Dragon Gate Inn, Tsui denied that this film would be a remake of the old classic but more of a re-imagining. Tsui also worked on the screenplay in addition to directing and producing the film, to ensure the originality of the story. Jet Li was signed with US$12 million contracts to star in this film. Li explained his reason for joining this film stating,

This film will be shot entirely in 3D, is the first time 3D is employed in a wuxia film, I'm curious to see to how far a 3D wuxia film can go. I look forward to seeing how technology would inject a new lease of life into the film industry. I have acquired an affinity with wuxia since young, which led me onto the path of filmmaking and thereby changing my entire destiny. Director Tsui Hark has placed me upon an enigmatic and vibrant stage, adding another layer of sentimental experience to my life. Stepping into this showbiz, allowed me to look at life from a different angle, and I have never felt that I had ever left the wuxia world.

Zhou Xun was also quoted for her reason for joining this film and she explains,

I was moved to tears when I went through the script, and Tsui Hark's wuxia world has always mesmerized me immensely. And it's often said that Tsui Hark is especially great at creating female roles, if All About Women is a makeover for me, then Dragon Gate is a complete overhaul. I believe that there is a certain power that changes my heart through Lin Yan Qiu.

Tsui also invited Chuck Comisky, the visual-effects supervisor for James Cameron's Avatar, as the 3-D director to manage the special effects. Comisky led a team of 3D crew from China, South Korea, Singapore, and Spain.

Principal photography began on October 10, 2010, with Tsui and his crew shot the film in 3-D. To prepare for the film and understand better about 3-D, Tsui filmed an experimental short film, with Charlie Yeung, Daniel Chan, and Yu Nan were participated in the project. Beside Beijing, filming also took place in Ningxia, Hubei, and Shaanxi. Principal photography wrapped on January 22, 2011, after over three months of shooting.
