= Carol Chu =

Malaysian model and entertainer

- 朱麗蒨
- Born: Chu Lai-hing (朱麗卿); 6 April 1966 (age 60); Penang, Malaysia
- Occupation: Model
- Height: 1.65 m (5 ft 5 in)
- Spouse: Andy Lau (m. 2008)
- Children: 1

Chinese name
- Traditional Chinese: 朱麗蒨
- Simplified Chinese: 朱丽蒨
Transcriptions
Standard Mandarin
- Hanyu Pinyin: Zhū Lìqiàn
Yue: Cantonese
- Jyutping: Zyu1 Lai6 Sin6
Southern Min
- Hokkien POJ: Chu Lê-chhiàn
- Tâi-lô: Tsu Lê-tshiàn

Chu Lai-hing
- Traditional Chinese: 朱麗卿
- Simplified Chinese: 朱丽卿
Transcriptions
Standard Mandarin
- Hanyu Pinyin: Zhū Lìqīng
Yue: Cantonese
- Jyutping: Zyu1 Lai6 Hing1
Southern Min
- Hokkien POJ: Chu Lê-kheng
- Tâi-lô: Tsu Lê-khing

Carol Chu Lai-chien (born Chu Lai-hing; 6 April 1966) is a former Malaysian model. She has been married to Hong Kong actor and singer Andy Lau since 2008.

== Biography ==
Carol Chu was born in Penang, Malaysia. Her family moved to Kuala Lumpur when she was at a young age, and ran a seafood restaurant there.

Chu started out as a model, and in 1985, contested in the Malaysian magazine model contest and emerged as a third runner-up.

In 1987, Chu was introduced by a Malaysian journalist to Hong Kong actor and singer Andy Lau. They started a secret relationship thereafter.

From 1991 onwards, Lau's relationship with Chu was often subjected to media attention and speculation.

In 2004, Chu became a vegetarian for religious reasons.

In June 2008, Lau and Chu married in Las Vegas.

Their daughter, Hanna Lau, was born at the Hong Kong Sanatorium & Hospital in Hong Kong on 9 May 2012. In 2013, Andy Lau became a vegetarian like Chu. Their daughter was first photographed by the media in April 2015 while they were at Chaoyang Park in Beijing.
