= You Are My Sassy Girl =

- Directed by: Zheng Li
- Production companies: Beijing Jinxin Dingli Media Co., Ltd; Beijing Shengda Media Co., Ltd; Beijing Chengrun Entertainment Co., Ltd
- Release date: September 12, 2014
- Running time: 94 minutes
- Country: China
- Language: Mandarin
- Box office: ¥0.71 million (China)

You Are My Sassy Girl (Chinese: 我是你的野蛮女友) is a 2014 Chinese romantic comedy film directed by Zheng Li. It was released on September 12, 2014.

== Cast ==
- Shi Tianshuo
- Mo Xi-er
- Kenneth Tsang
- Lam Wai
- Yi Liqi
- Jin Yi
- Tu Yanni
- Wang Wenqi

== Reception ==
It has earned ¥0.71 million at the Chinese box office.
