= Kenneth Tsang =

Hong Kong actor (1934–2022)

- 曾江
- Born: Tsang Wing-kong (曾榮江); 5 October 1934; Shanghai, China
- Died: 27 April 2022 (aged 87); Tsim Sha Tsui, Hong Kong
- Other name: Tsang Koon-yat (曾貫一)
- Education: McMurry University; University of California, Berkeley (BA)
- Occupation: Actor
- Years active: 1955–2022
- Spouses: Lan Di (m. 1969; div. 1979) Barbara Tang (m. 1980; div. 1990) Chiao Chiao (m. 1994)
- Children: 2

Chinese name
- Chinese: 曾江
Transcriptions
Standard Mandarin
- Hanyu Pinyin: zēng jiāng
Yue: Cantonese
- Jyutping: zang1 gong1

Signature
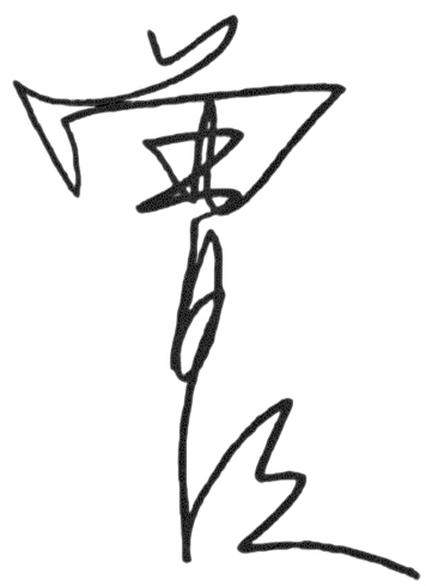

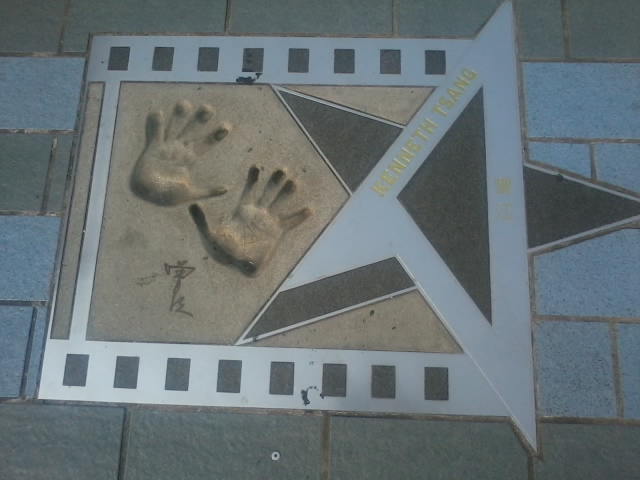
Kenneth Tsang's star on Avenue of Stars, Hong Kong.

Kenneth Tsang Kong (Chinese: 曾江; Sidney Lau: Jang^{1} Kong^{1}; born Tsang Wing-kong; courtesy name Koon-yat; 5 October 1934 – 27 April 2022) was a Hong Kong actor, whose career spanned nearly 70 years and over 200 film roles. A romantic leading man in Cantonese dramas and martial arts films during the 1960s and '70s, he gained international recognition for his supporting roles in contemporary crime and action pictures during the following decades, most notably in the films of John Woo. He also appeared in several Hollywood productions.

Aged 81, Tsang won the Hong Kong Film Award for Best Supporting Actor for his performance in Overheard 3 (2014), with a previous nomination for Overheard 2 (2011). In 2022, the year of his death, he received the Huading Award for Lifetime Achievement.

== Early life and education ==
Tsang Wing-kong was born in Shanghai with family roots in Jida, Zhuhai, Guangdong. Tsang attended high school in Wah Yan College, Hong Kong and then Wah Yan College, Kowloon. He received his university education in the United States, attending McMurry College in Abilene, Texas for his freshman year and transferred to University of California, Berkeley, where he received a degree in architecture.

== Career ==
Tsang returned to Hong Kong in the early 1960s as an architect but was unsatisfied by the work. His younger sister by 2 years, Jeanette Lin (林翠), was a film star at the time and provided Tsang with several connections in the industry which boosted his acting career.

Tsang's film debut was in the movie The Feud (1955) when he was 21, which was followed by a role in Who Isn't Romantic? (1956). In the mid-1960s, Tsang starred in detective films and classic kung fu movies with Hong Kong teen idols Connie Chan Po-chu and Josephine Siao. Tsang also appeared in a few Wong Fei-Hung movies in the late 1960s.

In 1986, Tsang worked as taxi cab owner, Ken, in John Woo's A Better Tomorrow. Subsequent collaborations with Woo included the role of Ken in A Better Tomorrow 2 in 1987, police officer Danny Lee's murdered partner in The Killer in 1989, and the strict adoptive father of Chow Yun-fat, Leslie Cheung and Cherie Chung in Once a Thief in 1991.

Tsang also filmed several Singaporean Chinese dramas during the 1990s, notably the 1995 epic The Teochew Family and The Unbeatables II in 1996.

Up to this point, Tsang had played roles in mainly Hong Kong movies. His first Hollywood film was The Replacement Killers (1998), also the Hollywood debut of co-star Chow Yun-fat. Tsang appeared alongside Chow once again in Anna and the King as well as Jackie Chan in Rush Hour 2. Tsang played General Moon in the James Bond film Die Another Day (2002), and he continued to appear in films from Hong Kong.

== Personal life ==
Tsang had a younger sister, Jeanette Lin Tsui (林翠), who was also a Hong Kong actress.

Tsang was married three times. His first wife was Chan Laidi (張萊娣), stage name Lan Di (藍娣), a Malaysian-Chinese and his co-star in The Big Circus and had a son. They divorced ten years later in 1979 and his son left to live with his mother. They have since resided in Vancouver, Canada. Chan died in 1991.

In 1980, Tsang married columnist and model Barbara Tang (邓拱璧) and had a daughter, Musette. Tsang and Tang divorced 10 years later in 1990.

In 1994 Tsang married Taiwanese actress Chiao Chiao (焦姣).

=== Death ===
Tsang departed from Singapore and arrived in Hong Kong on 25 April 2022, where he began a seven-day COVID-19 quarantine at the Kowloon Hotel. On the evening of 26 April, he experienced chest discomfort and asked his family to deliver his medication for chronic hypertension, which they promptly did. However, the following day, he was found unresponsive in his room by health officials who arrived to conduct a PCR test, and paramedics pronounced him dead at the scene.

== Filmography ==
=== Film ===
| Year | Title | Role | Notes | Ref. |
|---|---|---|---|---|
| 1955 | The Feud 同林鳥 | Liang Zuyi | | |
| 1956 | Love Is Everywhere 那個不多情 | Cheng Jia-Shu | | |
| 1962 | Who Is Not Romantic? 那個不多情(續集) | | | |
| 1964 | The Big Circus 大馬戲團 | Han Ying Chieh | | |
| 1965 | Blundering Woman Detective 糊塗女偵探 | | | |
| 1965 | Master Cute 老夫子 | | | |
| 1965 | A Brave Young Girl's Spirit (Part 1) 玉女英魂（上集） | | | |
| 1965 | A Brave Young Girl's Spirit (Part 2) 玉女英魂（下集） | Wu Yan-lung | | |
| 1965 | Book Without Words 無字天書 | White Wolf | | |
| 1966 | The Dark Heroine Mu Lanhua | Ko Cheung | | |
| 1966 | The Golden Cup and the Wandering Dragon 金鼎游龍 | | | |
| 1966 | The Golden Cup, the Wandering Dragon and the Decree to Kill 金鼎游龍勾魂令 | | | |
| 1966 | The Woman in Black and the Black Dragon | Ko Cheung | | |
| 1967 | Lady in Black Cracks the Gate of Hell | Ko Cheung | | |
| 1967 | Green-Eyed Demon 碧眼魔女 | Gold Hand Scholar | | |
| 1967 | She Is Our Senior 大師姐 | Lei Hou-Yin | | |
| 1967 | My Fair Lady | | | |
| 1967 | The Young Daughter-in-Law | Ah Cyun | | |
| 1967 | Romance of a Teenage Girl | Tai-Wai/David | | |
| 1967 | The Golden Swallow | | | |
| 1967 | Lady with a Cat's Eyes 貓眼女郎 | Sit Bong | | |
| 1967 | Good Wife | Chan Ngau | | |
| 1967 | Sister's Lover | Cheung Wei-Ming/piano teacher | | |
| 1967 | Every Girl a Romantic Dreamer 那個少女不多情 | Leung | | |
| 1967 | A Girl's Secret 玉女的秘密 | | | |
| 1967 | Tragedy in a Fishing Village | | | |
| 1967 | Wong Fei-Hung Against the Ruffians 黃飛鴻虎爪會群英 | Ling Wan-Gai | | |
| 1967 | The Black and the White Cats | | | |
| 1967 | Rocambole 殺手粉紅鑽 | Luk Ting-Bong | | |
| 1967 | Paragon of Sword and Knife 天劍絕刀 | | | |
| 1967 | My Darling Wife 嬌妻 | | | |
| 1968 | Bride in Chains | | | |
| 1968 | Lady Songbird | Lee Wai-Hon | | |
| 1968 | Wong Fei-Hung: The Incredible Success in Canton 黄飛鴻威震五羊城 | | | |
| 1968 | Orchid, the Songstress 歌女白蘭花 | | | |
| 1968 | The Deadly Dragon Sword 毒龍刀 | Kong Fan-ching | | |
| 1968 | Buddhist Spiritual Palm Returned 如來神掌再顯神威 | | | |
| 1968 | Buddhist Spiritual Palm 如來神掌劈魔平九派 | | | |
| 1968 | Wong Fei-Hung: The Invincible "Lion Dancer" 黄飛鸿醒獅獨霸梅花樁 | | | |
| 1968 | Purple Night 紫色風雨夜 | Kong Chi-Wai | | |
| 1968 | A Romantic Thief 多情妙賊 | Tsang Tai-Hsiung | | |
| 1968 | The Flower and the Sword 紅花血劍 | | | |
| 1968 | Hotel Blues 藍色酒店 | Jimmy Mak Jim-Mei | | |
| 1968 | The Grand Duel 武林大決鬥 | | | |
| 1968 | Three Heroines (Part 1) | Chu-kot Foon | | |
| 1968 | The Killing Sword 奪命刀 | Tin-Ngan | | |
| 1968 | Wong Fei-Hung: The Eight Bandits 黃飛鴻醉打八金剛 | Ling Wan-Gai | | |
| 1968 | The Magic Whip 神鞭俠 | | | |
| 1968 | The Magic Bow 神弓 | | | |
| 1968 | Wong Fei-Hung: The Duel Against the Black Rascal 黃飛鴻肉搏黑霸王 | Ling Wan-Gai | | |
| 1968 | Paragon of Sword and Knife (Grand Finale) 天劍絕刀（大結局） | | | |
| 1968 | Three Heroines (Part 2) | Chu-kot Foon | | |
| 1968 | The Magnificent Five 小五義大破銅網陣 | | | |
| 1968 | Wong Fei-Hung: Duel for the Championship 黃飛鴻拳王爭霸 | Ling Wan-Gai | | |
| 1968 | The Dragon Fortress 天狼寨 | Lung | | |
| 1968 | The Vengeful Spirit | | | |
| 1969 | The Twin Swords 奪命雌雄劍 | Ho Tin-Sang | | |
| 1969 | Colourful Paradise 七彩天堂 | | | |
| 1969 | Wong Fei-Hung: The Duel for the 'Sha-Yu-Qing' 黃飛鴻巧奪鯊魚青 | | | |
| 1969 | The Joys and Sorrows of Youth 冷暖青春 | Chow Hoi-Kit | | |
| 1969 | The Little Warrior 小武士 | General Sheung Kwun Hung | | |
| 1969 | Flying Thief, White Flower 飛賊白菊花 | | | |
| 1969 | Wise Wives and Foolish Husbands 聰明太太笨丈夫 | Alan Lee Si Kong | | |
| 1969 | Teddy Girls 飛女正傳 | To Shu-Yan | | |
| 1969 | Sky Dragon Castle 天龍堡 | | | |
| 1969 | The Strange Couple Who Steal | Cheung Wai-Man | | |
| 1969 | Wong Fei-Hung: The Conqueror of the 'Sam-hong Gang' 黃飛鴻神威伏三煞 | Ling Wan-Kai | | |
| 1969 | Mysterious Weapon | | | |
| 1969 | Bloody Handkerchief 血羅巾 | | | |
| 1969 | Red Rose, the Beautiful Avenger | Ah Kong | | |
| 1969 | Wong Fei-Hung's Combat with the Five Wolves 黃飛鴻虎鶴鬥五狼 | Ling Wan-Gai | | |
| 1969 | Mother Wants Me to Get Married | Suen Kwok-Wai | | |
| 1969 | The Swinging Bunch (Colour) 七彩紅男綠女 | | | |
| 1969 | Girls Are Flowers | | | |
| 1969 | Three Encounters 三招了 | Wong Chun-Sing | | |
| 1969 | The Virgin Sword 玉女劍 | Kam Chung-Yu | | |
| 1969 | Sword of Emei 峨嵋霸刀 | Au Gong | | |
| 1969 | The Prodigal 浪子 | Chan Oi-Lun | | |
| 1969 | Wong Fei-Hung in Sulphur Valley 黃飛鴻浴血硫磺穀 | Ling Wan-Gai | | |
| 1969 | Let's Build a Family | | | |
| 1969 | Famous Swordsman Tin Kiu 名劍天驕 | | | |
| 1969 | My Sweetheart 相思甜如蜜 | Tong Chi-Hung | | |
| 1970 | The Magic Bowl 聚寶盆 | | | |
| 1970 | The Naked Runner | | | |
| 1970 | The Lonely Rider 小金剛 | | | |
| 1970 | The Young Patrol | | | |
| 1970 | The Young Girl Dares Not Homeward 不敢回家的少女 | Peter Kuo | | |
| 1970 | To Crack the Dragon Gate 獨掌震龍門 | Sun Kim-Chiu | | |
| 1970 | I'll Get You One Day 總有一天捉到你 | Wong Dai Wai | | |
| 1970 | The Wedding Gown 嫁衣 | Tang Tien Chi | | |
| 1970 | Flying Sword and the Smart Lad 飛劍神童 | | | |
| 1970 | I Will Remember You Always | Yiu Kwok-Kei | | |
| 1970 | Choi Lee Fat 蔡李佛勇擒色魔 | Hung | | |
| 1970 | Yesterday, Today, Tomorrow 昨天今天明天 | Health Department chief Zhou | | |
| 1971 | The Brave and the Evil 黑白道 | Bandit Hsi Fei | | |
| 1971 | Demonstrator | Thao Kimalayo | | |
| 1971 | My Beloved 昨夜梦魂中 | Eu Lieh | | |
| 1971 | The Playful Girl 淘氣姑娘 | | | |
| 1972 | Flash Boxer 閃電拳 | Wei Li | | |
| 1972 | Love Is Smoke 輕烟 | Mr. Tseng | | |
| 1972 | The Naughty Couples 淘氣夫妻 | | | |
| 1972 | The Perfect Match 門當戶對 | | | |
| 1972 | Narrow stairs 窄梯 | | | |
| 1973 | The Call Girls 應召女郎 | TV moderator | | |
| 1973 | The Awaken Punch 石破天驚 | | | |
| 1973 | The Money-Tree 搖錢樹 | Hsiao-cheung | | |
| 1973 | We Visited Southeast Asia 福祿壽遊南洋 | Boss of SEA Detective Agency | | |
| 1974 | Bravest Fist 一山五虎 | Teacher | | |
| 1974 | The Paradise 天堂 | | | |
| 1974 | Everyday Is Sunday 天天報喜 | | | |
| 1974 | Blood Reincarnation 陰陽界 | | | |
| 1975 | The Hooker and the Hustler 神女蕩婦綽頭王 | Wang Kuo-Chun | | |
| 1975 | Where Have the Lovers Gone 晨星 | | | |
| 1975 | Sup Sap Bup Dup 十三不搭 | Philandering man | | |
| 1975 | The Playboy 二世祖 | | | |
| 1975 | Frigidity | | | |
| 1976 | The Eternal Obsession 未了緣 | Wong Yat-Bun | | |
| 1976 | Divorce Hong Kong Style | | | |
| 1978 | The Extras 茄哩啡 | Ting Chung | | |
| 1979 | The Secret 瘋劫 | Policeman | | |
| 1982 | Wild Cherry 野蜜桃 | | | |
| 1982 | Trap 大鱷 | Ma Man-Rei | | |
| 1983 | My Mother | | | |
| 1983 | The Body Is Willing 狂情 | Francis Chao | | |
| 1986 | Silver Dragon Ninja | ['Trap' Footage] | | |
| 1986 | Royal Warriors 皇家戰士 | Captain Lau Chi-Shing | | |
| 1986 | A Better Tomorrow | Ken | | |
| 1986 | Peking Opera Blues | General Cho | | |
| 1986 | My Will, I Will 你情我願 | Paul Wu Ke Jen | | |
| 1987 | Amnesty Decree 魔鬼天使 | Tsai | | |
| 1987 | A Better Tomorrow II | Uncle Ken | | |
| 1988 | The Story of Hay Bo 喜寶 | | | |
| 1988 | Goodbye My Friend 再見英雄 | | | |
| 1988 | Last Romance 流金歲月 | Li Chi Cheng | | |
| 1988 | Reunion 一樓一故事 | | | |
| 1989 | Return of the Lucky Stars | Uncle Kin | | |
| 1989 | Darkside of Chinatown 西雅圖大屠殺 | Uncle Kwan | | |
| 1989 | The Immigrant Policeman 警察也移民 | | | |
| 1989 | The First Time Is the Last Time 第一繭 | Jenny's father (cameo) | | |
| 1989 | The Killer | Sgt Tsang Yeh | | |
| 1989 | Triads – The Inside Story 我在黑社會的日子 | Supt. Chan Tin-Lok | | |
| 1989 | Thank You, Sir 壯誌雄心 | Mr Tsang | | |
| 1989 | I Am Sorry 說謊的女人 | Edward Sung | | |
| 1989 | Shadow of China | Mr Lau | | |
| 1989 | Princess Madam 金牌師姐 | | | |
| 1990 | Return to Action | Officer Ng | | |
| 1990 | Brief Encounter in Shinjuku 錯在新宿 | Mr Tseng | | |
| 1990 | Promising Miss Bowie | Mr. Chow | | |
| 1990 | Sleazy Dizzy 小偷阿星 | Chief Inspector Lee | | |
| 1990 | 奔向USA | | | |
| 1990 | Point of No Return 都市煞星 | Uncle Min | | |
| 1991 | Drugs Area 毒網 | | | |
| 1991 | Bury Me High 衛斯理之霸王卸甲 | President of Carrinan | | |
| 1991 | Queen's High 紅粉至尊 | Fan Yau Tim | | |
| 1991 | Once a Thief | Mr Chow | | |
| 1991 | Au Revoir, Mon Amour 何日君再來 | Mui-Yi's father | | |
| 1991 | To Be Number One | Chief Inspector Tiger Lui | | |
| 1991 | The Plot 佈局 | Kiu (The Boss) | | |
| 1991 | Inspector Pink Dragon | Chief Insp Pao | | |
| 1991 | Legend of the Brothers 四大家族之龍虎兄弟 | Detective Lui Kwok Tin | | |
| 1991 | The Banquet | Waiter | | |
| 1992 | Megaforce from Highland 血染紅塵 | Sgt Lau | | |
| 1992 | The Thief of Time | | | |
| 1992 | The Story of Taipei Women 胭脂 | | | |
| 1992 | Changing Partner 夜夜伴肥嬌 | Chief Inspector Wong Kwok Wing | | |
| 1992 | Police Story 3: Supercop | Khun Chaibat | | |
| 1992 | The Prince of Temple Street | San (cameo) | | |
| 1992 | Second to None 阿二一族 | Julian's father | | |
| 1992 | Angel Terminators 轟天皇家將 | Sawa Da / Zeng Jian | | |
| 1992 | The Night Rider 車神 | Superintendent | | |
| 1993 | The Top Lady of Sword 葵花聖女 | | | |
| 1993 | Combat at Heaven Gate 決戰天門 | Proefessor Chen | | |
| 1993 | Shadow Cop 神探乾濕褸 | Officer Chiang | | |
| 1993 | The Bare-Footed Kid 赤脚小子 | Ke Hu Pu | | |
| 1993 | Lover of the Swindler 千王情人 | Doctor Wong | | |
| 1993 | Remains of a Woman 郎心如鐵 | | | |
| 1993 | No Regret, No Return 走上不歸路 | Lau Sin | | |
| 1993 | The Trail 大路 | | | |
| 1994 | Dead End 死角 | 王達龍 | Telemovie | |
| 1994 | Long and Winding Road 錦繡前程 | Bosco Chow | | |
| 1997 | Up for the Rising Sun抱擁朝陽 | Kwok Yi Song | | |
| 1998 | The Replacement Killers | Terence Wei | | |
| 1998 | The Blacksheep Affair 碧血藍天 | Lone | | |
| 1998 | Bishonen 美少年之戀 | Sam's father | | |
| 1999 | Anna and the King | Justice Phya Phrom. | | |
| 2000 | Killer 刀手 | Prince | | |
| 2001 | Rush Hour 2 | Captain Chin | | |
| 2001 | Rude Husband | | | |
| 2001 | Funeral March | Wong Cheuk Kong | | |
| 2002 | The Touch 天脈傳奇 | Uncle Ping | | |
| 2002 | Die Another Day | General Moon | | |
| 2004 | 6 Strong Guys 六壯士 | Mr Lau | | |
| 2004 | Colour Blossoms | Inspector Cheung | | |
| 2004 | Butterfly | Flavia's father | | |
| 2005 | Memoirs of a Geisha | The General | | |
| 2006 | The Tokyo Trial 东京审判 | Hsiang Che Chun | | |
| 2007 | 追捕 | | | |
| 2007 | The Drummer | Stephen Ma | | |
| 2008 | Kung Fu Dunk | Wang Yiwuan | | |
| 2009 | The Treasure Hunter | Master Tu | | |
| 2009 | Formosa Betrayed | General Tse | | |
| 2009 | Prince of Tears | General Liu (劉將軍) | | |
| 2009 | Blood Ties | Woon Sir | | |
| 2009 | Motherland | Stanley Tang | | |
| 2009 | The Treasure Hunter | Tu Lao-dai | | |
| 2010 | East Wind, Rain 東風雨 | Gentleman Yu | | |
| 2010 | Here Comes Fortune | | | |
| 2011 | My Wedding and Other Secrets | Dr Chu | | |
| 2011 | Overheard 2 | Tony Wong Sai-Tung | | |
| 2011 | Inseparable | Mr Wang | | |
| 2011 | Starry Starry Night | Xiao Mei's grandfather | | |
| 2012 | Joyful Reunion | Tang Shizhe | | |
| 2012 | Supercapitalist | Victor Chang | | |
| 2012 | 37 | Board Director | | |
| 2013 | The Truth of Love | | | |
| 2013 | The Mercury Conspiracy | Mr. Feng | | |
| 2014 | The Eyes of Dawn | | | |
| 2014 | You Are My Sassy Girl | Shen's father | | |
| 2014 | The Summer of Our Graduation | | | |
| 2014 | Overheard 3 | Uncle To | | |
| 2015 | Fight Up | | | |
| 2015 | Wonder Mama | | | |
| 2016 | Good Night 爱上试睡师 | | | |
| 2016 | Legend of Poker King | | | |
| 2016 | Return of the Heroes | | | |
| 2016 | For a Few Bullets | Oda Koki | | |
| 2017 | Baby Task Group | | | |
| 2017 | The Express 恐怖快递 | | | |
| 2017 | Chasing the Dragon | Sir Chow | | |
| 2018 | Detective Chinatown 2 | Uncle Seven | | |
| 2018 | Napping Kid | Chik Kuen | | |
| 2019 | Baby Task Group 2 | | | |
| 2019 | Dearest Anita | Night club boss | | |
| 2020 | Super Me | | | |
| 2021 | Man on the Edge 邊緣行者 | Senior LegCo member | | |
| 2021 | Daily Fantasy 日常幻想指南 | Bubble car | | |
| 2021 | The Attorney 級指控 | Tsang Kwok-Shan | | |
| 2022 | Deliverance 源生罪 | | | |

=== Television ===
| Year | Title | Role | Notes | Ref. |
|---|---|---|---|---|
| 1976 | The Legend of the Condor Heroes | Kwok Shiu-tin | 1 episode | |
| 1982 | Demi-Gods and Semi-Devils | Western Xia king | | |
| 1983 | The Superpower | Cheung Siu-san | | |
| 1983 | The Legend of the Condor Heroes | Wong Yeuk-si | | |
| 1983 | The Return of the Condor Heroes | Wong Yeuk-sze | | |
| 1984 | The Smiling, Proud Wanderer | Ngok But-kwan | | |
| 1984 | The Duke of Mount Deer | Chan Kan-nam | | |
| 1985 | Sword Stained with Royal Blood | Yun Sung-wan | | |
| 1985 | The Flying Fox of Snowy Mountain | Tin Kwai-nung | | |
| 1986 | New Heavenly Sword and Dragon Sabre | Tse Shun | | |
| 1989 | Deadly Secret | Ting Tin | | |
| 1990 | Blood of Good and Evil 我本善良 | Chai Kiu Jing | | |
| 1992 | The Greed of Man | Lung Sing-bong | | |
| 1993 | Racing Peak 馬場大亨 | 李奇 | | |
| 1995 | The Teochew Family | Cai Qing-yang | | |
| 1996 | The Unbeatables II | Ye Zhong | | |
| 1998 | The New Adventures of Wisely | Chief Bai | | |
| 1998 | Legend of the Crow 乌丫传说 | | | |
| 1998 | Riding The Storm 陌生人 | | | |
| 1999 | Phua Chu Kang Pte Ltd | Ah Boon's Father | | |
| 2005 | The Great Adventure | | | |
| 2007–2008 | Parental Guidance | Patrick Seto | | |
| 2010 | Who's the Hero 勝者為王 | | | |
| 2011 | ICAC Investigators 2011 | | | |
| 2016 | Stan Lee's Lucky Man | Freddie Lau | | |
| 2019 | The Great Craftsman 筑梦情缘 | Chang Bingkun | | |

== Awards and nominations ==
| Year | Organisation | Category | Nominated work | Result | Ref. |
|---|---|---|---|---|---|
| 1999 | Star Awards | Top 10 Most Popular Male Artistes | —N/a | Nominated | |
| 2015 | Hong Kong Film Award | Best Supporting Actor | Overheard 3 竊聽風雲3 (as Uncle To) | Won | |
