= Starry Starry Night (film) =

2011 Taiwanese-Chinese-Hong Kong film by Tom Lin Shu-yu

- Hong Kong film poster
- Directed by: Tom Lin Shu-yu
- Written by: Tom Lin Shu-yu
- Based on: Starry Starry Night by Jimmy Liao
- Produced by: Chen Kuo-fu; Wang Zhong-lei
- Starring: Xu Jiao; Eric Lin Hui-min
- Cinematography: Jake Pollock
- Edited by: Cheng Hsiao-tse; Xiao Yang
- Music by: World's End Girlfriend
- Distributed by: Huayi Brothers (China); Atom Cinema (Taiwan)
- Release dates: 11 October 2011 (Busan); 3 November 2011 (China); 4 November 2011 (Taiwan)
- Running time: 120 minutes
- Countries: Taiwan; China; Hong Kong
- Language: Mandarin
- Budget: US$7 million
- Box office: US$$589,299

Starry Starry Night (Chinese: 星空) is a 2011 fantasy drama film based on an illustrated novel by Taiwanese author Jimmy Liao. A Taiwanese-Chinese-Hong Kong co-production, the film is directed by Tom Lin Shu-yu, and stars Xu Jiao and Erek Lin.

Starry Starry Night was first showcased at the 2011 Busan International Film Festival as part of its "New Currents" section. It was released in Chinese and Taiwanese theaters on 3 and 4 November 2011, respectively.

== Plot ==
Xiao Mei used to live with her grandparents up in the mountains. When she later moves to the city to live with her parents, she finds the place cold and distant as compared to the village she once lived in. She longs for a simple and carefree life, and the experience of lying down on a field at night and looking up at the starry night above. Her parents are experiencing work-related stress and are having marriage problems.

One day, Xiao Mei was attracted to a beautiful recorder melody of a Christmas carol being played by her neighbor. She later learns that the neighbor is called Xiao Jie, a problematic child who is a new student in her school. Xiao Mei starts to be attracted to Xiao Jie, who is always getting bullied by the rest of his classmates after he was deemed "cocky". The pair's friendship grows deeper after Xiao Mei saves Xiao Jie from these bullies. They decorate their classroom together for an inter-class competition, and Xiao Mei takes to shoplifting for fun after seeing Xiao Jie shoplift. Xiao Mei later shares information on French art with Xiao Jie while she tries to purchase a jigsaw piece from a puzzle of "Starry Starry Night" to replace the one that she had lost.

Suddenly, shortly after her beloved grandfather's death, Xiao Mei's parents announce that they will be divorcing. Upon hearing that, Xiao Mei's world starts to fall apart. She runs away from home, together with Xiao Jie, to visit the small wooden shack that she shared with her grandparents in the past.

On the way to the shack, Xiao Mei leads both of them up a wrong path and they got lost in the forest. Luckily, they found an abandoned church to stay in overnight. That night, Xiao Mei gets to know more about Xiao Jie's tremulous family background, and she stops pitying her own family background. They eventually found the wooden shack the next day, and Xiao Mei starts to look through her grandfather's workshop.

That night, the weather is too foggy for them to enjoy the stars. Xiao Mei also starts to develop a fever. As Xiao Jie carries her back to the wooden shack, he gets a short glimpse of the beautiful night sky that Xiao Mei talked about. Upon reaching the shack, Xiao Jie contacts their parents while Xiao Mei is asleep. When she wakes up, she finds herself on a hospital bed. Later, when Xiao Mei is in the 10th grade, she receives the jigsaw piece that her puzzle of the "Starry Starry Night" painting was missing.

Many years later, in France, Xiao Mei and her stepsister are walking along the streets on Christmas Eve. Suddenly Xiao Mei's stepsister sees a jigsaw puzzle with a missing piece on display. Upon entering the shop, Xiao Mei saw a jigsaw of "Starry Starry Night" which had the same missing piece as hers.

== Cast ==
- Xu Jiao as Xiao Mei, whose full name is Hsieh Xin-Mei. She is a 13-year-old girl who is troubled by her family's problems. She often withdraws into her make-believe world in order to avoid reality. She becomes socially confident after this experience with Xiao Jie.
- Erek Lin as Zhou Yu-Jie, who is commonly known as Xiao Jie. He is socially awkward because his mother does not settle down in one place long enough for him to bond with his classmates. However, he is very good at drawing.
- Harlem Yu as Mei's father.
- Rene Liu as Mei's mother, an art dealer who specializes in impressionist paintings, a job that she is very unhappy with. After her divorce, she remarried and moved to France.
- Gwei Lun-mei as a grown-up Xiao Mei who is living in France with her mother and younger sister many years later.

== Production ==
=== Development ===
Director Tom Lin, who made his directorial debut with the 2008 film Winds of September, wanted to create a film based on the illustrated novel Starry Starry Night by illustrator and writer Jimmy Liao. The illustrated novel is one of Lin's favorite book. Initially, Lin planned to create a "small art-house movie" collaboration with Liao.

After the Chinese film studio Huayi Brothers picked up the film, the film became a China-Taiwan co-production, and the film's budget was increased to a total of US$7 million. Co-productions between Taiwan and China are sometimes subjected to strict scrutiny by censorship boards. However, the film was described as a successful co-production by its director, and its script remained unchanged.

=== Filming ===
Starry Starry Night was filmed at the Taipei Railway Station during a period of two days in March 2011. Although the filming was originally planned to begin in June 2011, it was moved forward because of the planned renovation of the railway station. In addition, the film was also shot other locations in France.

Tom Lin said that this film was filmed in locations that were "less popular for filmmaking". He added that "We [the film producers] wanted to show a unique side and were careful and strict about every frame and lighting. We wanted perfection.".

== Soundtrack ==
Starry Starry Night: Original Motion Picture Soundtrack

Soundtrack album by World's End Girlfriend
- Released: 13 April 2012
- Genre: Film soundtrack

No.	Title	Performer	Length
1.	"Starry"	World's End Girlfriend	01:39
2.	"Storytelling (feat. Shione Yukawa)"	World's End Girlfriend	05:59
3.	"Smile (feat. Shione Yukawa)"	World's End Girlfriend	04:02
4.	"Three-Legged Elephant"	World's End Girlfriend	03:53
5.	"The Little Finger"	World's End Girlfriend	03:35
6.	"Two of Us"	World's End Girlfriend	05:32
7.	"Your Footsteps Are Music"	World's End Girlfriend	00:50
8.	"March"	World's End Girlfriend	03:41
9.	"Lost a Piece"	World's End Girlfriend	03:15
10.	"Night Floater"	World's End Girlfriend	02:51
11.	"Puzzle"	World's End Girlfriend	01:37
12.	"Our Footsteps Are Music"	World's End Girlfriend	03:44

No.	Title	Writer(s)	Performer	Length
1.	"Starry Night 星空"	Ashin, Stone	Mayday	04:43

== Critical reception ==
James Marsh of Twitch Films described the film as a "visual feast". He praised the main actress Xu Jiao, saying that she "is maturing incredibly well as an acting talent of note here", and added that she "pretty much carries the entire film with unflappable poise and a disarming charm that steers clear of being cutesy for the cameras". He also commented on the "touching epilogue" of this film, saying that it "at first feels unnecessary, but completely sells itself in the film's final moments". Marsh concluded his review by saying that this film is "a tender, heartfelt treat about the end of childhood and the loss of innocence and a flight of fancy well worth taking".

== Awards and nominations ==
Award ceremony	Category	Recipients	Result
6th Asian Film Awards	Best Newcomer	Eric Lin Hui-min	Nominated
6th Asian Film Awards	Best Visual Effects	Xiao Yang, Chang Song, A Law, Li Ming-hsung, Li Jin-hui	Nominated
2012 Asia-Pacific Film Festival	Best Cinematography	Jake Pollock	Won
2012 Beijing College Student Film Festival	Best Film	Starry Starry Night	Nominated
2012 Beijing College Student Film Festival	Best Director	Tom Lin Shu-yu	Nominated
49th Golden Horse Awards	Best Adapted Screenplay	Tom Lin Shu-yu	Nominated
49th Golden Horse Awards	Best Visual Effects	Xiao Yang, Chang Song, A Law, Li Ming-hsung, Li Jin-hui	Nominated
49th Golden Horse Awards	Best New Performer	Eric Lin Hui-min	Nominated
49th Golden Horse Awards	Best Art Direction	Penny Tsai	Nominated
2013 Golden Rooster Awards	Best Children's Film	Starry Starry Night	Nominated
31st Hong Kong Film Awards	Best Film from Mainland and Taiwan	Starry Starry Night	Nominated
2012 Taipei Film Festival	Best New Talent	Eric Lin Hui-min	Won
2012 Taipei Film Festival	Best Visual Effects Supervisor	Xiao Yang, Chang Song, A Law, Li Ming-hsung, Li Jin-hui	Won
