= Big Blue Lake =

2011 Hong Kong film by Jessey Tsang

- Film poster
- Directed by: Jessey Tsang Tsui-Shan
- Written by: Jessey Tsang Tsui-Shan; Bo-bo Luk
- Produced by: Teresa Kwong; Rita Hui
- Starring: Leila Tong
- Cinematography: Chung-yip Yau
- Edited by: Kattie Fan
- Music by: Shigeno Masamichi
- Distributed by: Golden Scene
- Release date: 17 November 2011
- Running time: 104 minutes
- Country: Hong Kong
- Language: Cantonese

Big Blue Lake (Chinese: 大藍湖, translit. Da lan hu) is a 2011 Hong Kong drama film directed by Jessey Tsang Tsui-Shan.

== Cast ==
- Leila Tong
- Lawrence Chou
- Amy Chum
- Angi Au
- Lillian Ho
- Philip Ng
- Ben Yeung
