= Dragon (2011 film) =

2011 Hong Kong-Chinese film by Peter Chan

- Hong Kong film poster
- 武侠
- Directed by: Peter Chan
- Written by: Aubrey Lam; Joyce Chan
- Produced by: Peter Chan; Jojo Hui
- Starring: Donnie Yen; Takeshi Kaneshiro; Tang Wei
- Cinematography: Lai Yiu-fai; Jake Pollock
- Edited by: Derek Hui
- Music by: Chan Kwong-wing; Peter Kam; Chatchai Pongprapaphan
- Production companies: We Pictures; Stellar Mega Films; Dingsheng Cultural Industry Investment; Jiangsu Broadcasting Corporation; Yunnan Film Group
- Distributed by: We Distributions; Lark Films Distribution
- Release dates: 13 May 2011 (Cannes); 28 July 2011 (Hong Kong)
- Running time: 116 minutes
- Countries: Hong Kong; China
- Languages: Mandarin; Sichuanese; Cantonese
- Budget: US$20 million
- Box office: US$29.1 million

Dragon (武侠) is a 2011 martial arts film directed by Peter Chan, starring Donnie Yen, Takeshi Kaneshiro and Tang Wei. A Hong Kong-Chinese co-production, Yen also served as the film's action director. It premiered on 13 May 2011 at the 2011 Cannes Film Festival in the Midnight Screenings category.

Donnie Yen and Peter Chan presided over the lighting of a 3591-square-metre billboard for Dragon that broke the record in the Guinness Book of World Records for its size, a record previously held by a poster for a Michael Jackson album.

== Plot ==
The film is set in China in 1917. Liu Jinxi lives with his wife Yu and their two sons Fangzheng and Xiaotian in a village in Yunnan. One day, two robbers show up and attempt to rob a shop that Liu is in. A fight breaks out and Liu kills the robbers – apparently by accident.

Xu Baijiu, a detective sent to investigate the case, discovers that one of the robbers was a formidable fighter, and feels suspicious about how Liu could "accidentally" kill the robber. While the villagers celebrate Liu's heroic deed, Xu performs an autopsy and learns that the robber died of brain haemorrhaging after sustaining a blow to his vagus nerve. After collecting more evidence, Xu realises that Liu is actually a highly skilled martial artist who conceals his talent through misdirection and that Liu is a former member of the 72 Demons, a group of vicious and bloodthirsty warriors. When Xu confronts Liu, the latter admits his past and says that he has reformed.

Xu returns to the county office and obtains an arrest warrant for Liu. After issuing the warrant, the corrupt magistrate informs the Master of the 72 Demons of Liu's whereabouts, hoping to receive a reward. Offended, the Master reveals that Liu is his son and kills the magistrate, after which he sends his henchmen to the village to capture Liu. Liu kills the henchmen, and tells the villagers to take shelter in a fortress.

Using his knowledge of physiology, Xu helps Liu fake his death to fool the 72 Demons. However, the ruse fails, and Liu severs his left arm to signify his cutting of ties with them. Liu then goes home to meet the Master, who has taken Liu's family hostage. The Master agrees to allow Liu to leave the group but Liu's son Xiaotian must take his father's place.

Enraged, Liu attacks the Master with a broadsword but the Master uses qigong to protect himself from the blade. Xu infiltrates the house from underneath the floorboards and uses an acupuncture needle to pierce the Master's heel, weakening his defence. The Master incapacitates Xu and overpowers Liu, but Xu uses another needle to pierce the Master's neck. Just after the Master fatally wounds Xu, he is killed by a bolt of lightning as the needles serve as a lightning rod and earthing wire. With his dying breath, Xu announces the case closed. Liu continues to lead a peaceful life with his family.

== Cast ==
- Donnie Yen as Liu Jinxi / Tang Long, the Master's son.
- Takeshi Kaneshiro as Xu Baijiu, the Sichuanese-speaking detective.
- Tang Wei as Yu, Liu Jinxi's wife.
- Jimmy Wang as the Master, the leader of the 72 Demons.
- Kara Hui as 13th Madam, the Master's wife.
- Li Xiaoran as Xu Baijiu's estranged wife
- Jiang Wu as Xu Baijiu's investigator
- Zheng Wei as Liu Fangzheng, Yu's son from her previous marriage.
- Li Jiamin as Liu Xiaotian, Liu Jinxi and Yu's son.
- Ethan Juan as the young convict who poisoned his parents.
- Chun Hyn as the tavern owner
- Wan To-shing as Xu Kun, one of the 72 Demons.
- Yu Kang as Yan Dongsheng, a wanted criminal killed by Liu Jinxi.

== Production ==
Dragon began as a remake of Chang Cheh's 1967 film The One-Armed Swordsman, but, according to Twitch Film, these plans were "quickly abandoned". However, many plot details in Dragon are influenced by The One-Armed Swordsman, including the appearance of Jimmy Wang, who portrayed the eponymous swordsman.

== Release ==
The film topped China's box office and grossed over 100 million yuan (US$15.6 million) in its first opening week. The American premiere was held on closing night of ActionFest on April 15, 2012. The film was acquired by RADIUS-TWC for the US and released to VOD on October 26, followed by a limited theatrical release on November 30.

== Reception ==
Justin Chang of Variety describes the film as "a satisfyingly sinewy fusion of martial-arts actioner and brain-tickling noir from busy producer-director Peter Ho-sun Chan. Channeling David Cronenberg's A History of Violence by way of 1917 China, this clever if over-amped thriller tackles themes of identity, honor and the latent killer instinct with a playful spirit that's never at odds with its underlying seriousness." Maggie Lee of The Hollywood Reporter describes it as "an exhilarating martial arts entertainment that modernizes the genre while re-emphasizing its strong points."

=== Awards and nominations ===
31st Hong Kong Film Awards

- Nominated: Best Actress (Tang Wei)
- Nominated: Best Supporting Actor (Jimmy Wang)
- Nominated: Best Supporting Actress (Kara Hui)
- Won: Best Cinematography
- Nominated: Best Editing
- Nominated: Best Art Direction
- Nominated: Best Costume Design
- Nominated: Best Action Choreography
- Nominated: Best Visual Effects
- Won: Best Original Score
- Nominated: Best Original Song
