= Lu I-feng =

Taiwanese politician

Lu I-feng (Chinese: 盧逸峰; born 25 November 1962) is a Taiwanese politician.

Lu attended the Lan Yang Institute of Technology. He was affiliated with the Kuomintang, and sat on the Legislative Yuan between 1999 and 2002, representing Yilan.
