= Andy Lau =

Hong Kong actor and singer (born 1961)

Andy Lau SBS BBS MH JP
- 劉德華
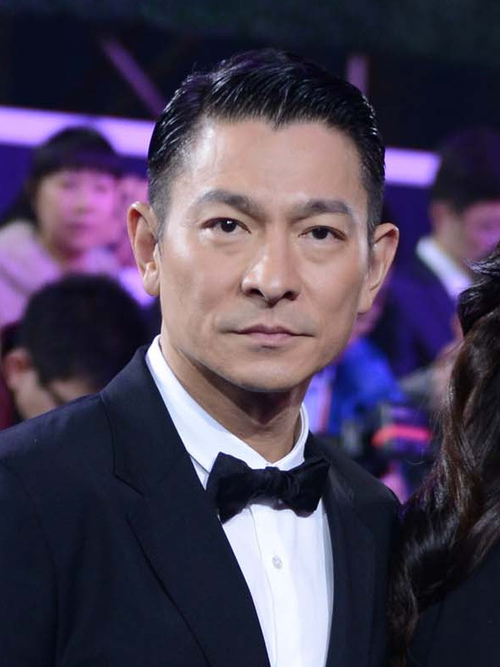
- Lau at the 2013 Beijing International Film Festival
- Born: Lau Fook-wing (劉福榮); 27 September 1961 (age 65); Tai Po, Hong Kong
- Other names: Wah Zai (華仔); Lau Wah (劉華); Wah Dee (華Dee); Ngau Wah (牛華); Hui Guo (慧果); (Dharma name)
- Education: Ho Lap College
- Occupations: Actor; singer; film producer; lyricist; composer; businessman
- Years active: 1981–present
- Works: Filmography; discography
- Spouse: Carol Chu (m. 2008)
- Children: Hanna Lau
- Father: Lau Lai
- Relatives: Lau Tak-sing (brother)
- Awards: Full list
- Musical career
- Origin: Hong Kong
- Genres: Cantopop; Mandopop
- Instrument: Vocals
- Labels: Capital Artists (1985); EMI Music Publishing (1987–1989); PolyGram (1990–1992); UFO Records (1992–1995); Bertelsmann Music Group (1996–2001); Catchy Entertainment Ltd. (2002–2004); Focus Music (2005–present)

Chinese name
- Traditional Chinese: 劉德華
- Simplified Chinese: 刘德华
Transcriptions
Standard Mandarin
- Hanyu Pinyin: Liú Déhuá
Yue: Cantonese
- Yale Romanization: Làuh Dāk-wàah
- Jyutping: Lau4 Dak1-waa4
- IPA: [lɐw˩ tɐk̚˥ wa˩]
- Website: awc618.com

Signature
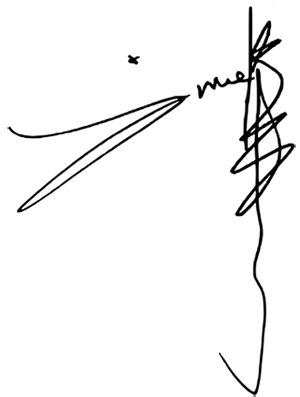

Andy Lau Tak-wah SBS BBS MH JP (Chinese: 劉德華; Jyutping: Lau4 Dak1-waa4; born Lau Fook-wing; 27 September 1961), is a Hong Kong actor, singer-songwriter and film producer. He was named one of the Five Tiger Generals of TVB in the 1980s as well as one of the Four Heavenly Kings in the 1990s. Lau won the Hong Kong Film Award for Best Actor three times, the Golden Horse Award for Best Leading Actor twice, and was entered into the Guinness World Records for the "Most Awards Won by a Cantopop Male Artist" in 2000, with a total of 444 music awards by 2006. In 2018, Lau became a member of the Academy of Motion Picture Arts and Sciences. In 2024, Lau was elected vice chairman of the 11th China Film Association. Over a career of four decades, Lau has been one of the most commercially and critically successful artists in the Chinese-speaking world.

== Early life ==
Lau was born Lau Fook-wing in Tai Po, British Hong Kong, to fireman Lau Lai (1934–2023). He is the fourth of six siblings and has three elder sisters, one younger sister, and a younger brother named Lau Tak-sing. Although his family was wealthy due to his grandfather being a landowner with farmland and villages, his father moved them to the slums of Diamond Hill when he was six years old so he could receive a bilingual education to improve his English. The area was full of wooden houses, which burnt down when he was eleven. During his childhood, Lau had to fetch water for his family up to eight times a day as their house lacked plumbing. He graduated from a Band One secondary school, Ho Lap College in San Po Kong, Kowloon. He also practices Chinese calligraphy and hair styling. He was raised in a nominally Buddhist household and is a follower of the Lingyan Mountain Temple in Taiwan.

== Career ==
=== Acting ===
In 1980, Lau enrolled in TVB's actor training program and graduated the next year, signing a contract with TVB. He was propelled to fame by the TVB series The Emissary (1982). His popularity soared the next year with his role as Yang Guo in the TVB wuxia series The Return of the Condor Heroes; at the end of the year, Lau was featured in the TVB Anniversary Gala Show, alongside Tony Leung, Michael Miu, Felix Wong, and Kent Tong. Since then they were known as the "Five Tiger Generals of TVB".

Meanwhile, Lau also started his film career. He made a guest appearance in one of Susanna Kwan's music videos in 1981 and caught the eye of the manager Teddy Robin, who gave Lau his first minor role in the film, Once Upon a Rainbow. Lau then landed a role in Ann Hui's 1982 film, Boat People. In 1983, he had his first leading role in the Shaw Brothers-produced action film, On the Wrong Track.

TVB insisted on a binding five-year exclusive contract, which Lau declined to sign, leading to his blacklisting by the network. In the late '80s, Lau departed from TVB and shifted his focus towards films. He established himself for his performances in films such as The Truth (1988), Wong Kar-wai's As Tears Go By (1988), and Benny Chan's film A Moment of Romance (1990). His first major acting prize came with A Fighter's Blues, which was his first Golden Bauhinia Award for Best Actor. He won the Hong Kong Film Award for Best Actor award that year for Running Out of Time. In 2004, he won the Golden Horse Award for Best Leading Actor for his performance in Infernal Affairs III.

Since the early 21st century, Lau has started working with filmmakers from China and beyond, notably in Zhang Yimou's House of Flying Daggers (2004) and Feng Xiaogang's A World Without Thieves (2004). In 2006 he starred in the pan-Asian blockbuster A Battle of Wits (2006), followed by a series of big-budget historical films such as The Warlords (2007), Three Kingdoms: Resurrection of the Dragon (2008), and Tsui Hark's Detective Dee and the Mystery of the Phantom Flame (2010).

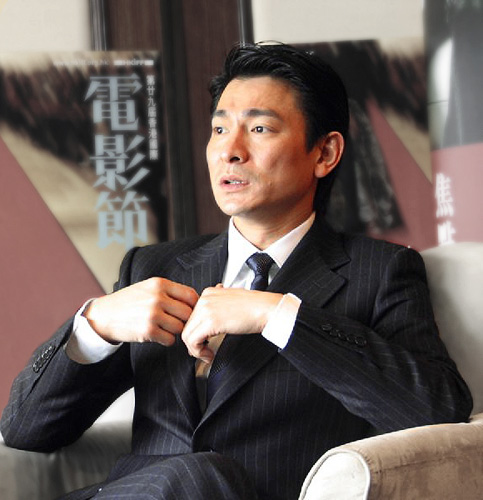
Lau being interviewed at the 2005 Hong Kong International Film Festival

In 2005, Lau received the "No.1 Box office Actor 1985–2005" award of Hong Kong, yielding a box office total of HKD 1,733,275,816 for shooting 108 films in the past 20 years. The aforementioned figure is as compared to the first runner-up Stephen Chow's (HKD 1,317,452,311) and second runner-up Jackie Chan's (HKD 894,090,962). For his contributions, a wax figure of Lau was unveiled on 1 June 2005 at the Madame Tussauds Hong Kong. In 2007, Lau also received the "Nielsen Box Office Star of Asia" award by the Nielsen Company (ACNielsen).

In April 2017, he starred in the Hong Kong action film Shock Wave, which earned him another Best Actor Award at the 37th Hong Kong Film Awards in 2018. In February 2021, Lau reunited with Tony Leung since the Infernal Affairs series in the action film The Goldfinger.

=== Film production ===
In 1991, Lau set up his own film production company, Teamwork Motion Pictures, which in 2002 was renamed to Focus Group Holdings Limited. He was awarded the "Asian Filmmaker of the Year" in the Pusan International Film Festival in 2006. The films Lau has produced include Made in Hong Kong, A Simple Life, A Fighter's Blues, Crazy Stone, Firestorm, and Shock Wave.

=== Music ===
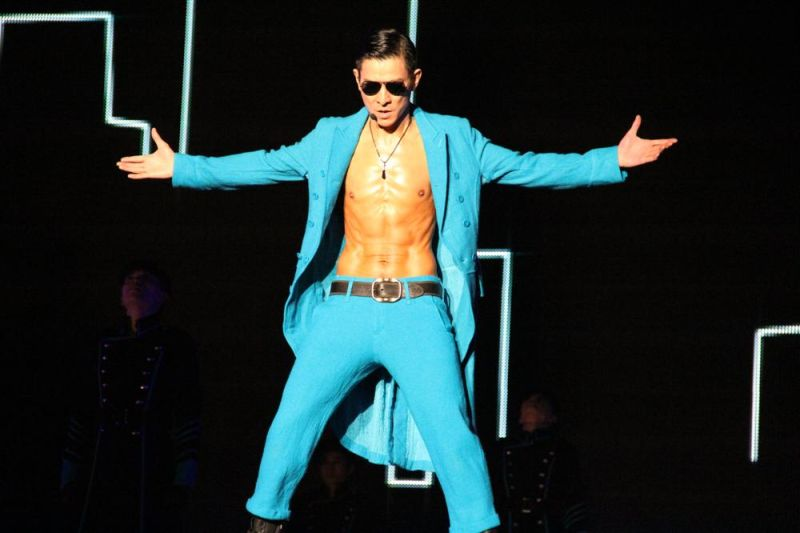
Lau performing during the Unforgettable Tour in 2011

Lau released his first album Just Know I Only Love You (1985) under the record label Capital Artists to minimal commercial success. However, he achieved mainstream success in 1990 with the release of the album Would It Be Possible, which won Lau his first RTHK Top 10 Gold Songs Award. The following year, he released the single "The Days We Spent Together" which topped Hong Kong's music charts and was an international hit across Asia. The song was lauded by Time Out which described its popularity as "practically a national anthem" and "one of the most notable hits" in Lau's career. His subsequent albums brought him further recognition spawning hit singles such as Ice Rain (1993), Forget Love Potion (1994), and Stupid Fellow (1998). His popularity as a music artist was such that Lau was dubbed as one of the Cantopop Four Heavenly Kings along with Jacky Cheung, Aaron Kwok, and Leon Lai. His album Love Notes Written in Bone Upon My Heart (1997) is certified 2× Platinum in Taiwan and is one of the best-selling albums with 640,305 copies sold. His other albums Because of Love (1996) and Love is Mysterious (1997) also reached 2× Platinum status there.

At the Jade Solid Gold Top 10 Awards, he won the "Most Popular Hong Kong Male Artist" award 7 times and the "Asia Pacific Most Popular Hong Kong Male Artist" award 15 times. By April 2000, he had already won an unprecedented total of 292 awards. That same year, he entered the Guinness World Records for "Most Awards Won by a Cantopop Male Artist" and again in 2021 for "Most Douyin Followers Gained in 24 hours" and "Fastest Time to Reach Ten Million Followers on Douyin".

At the 2008 Summer Olympics, Lau sang "Please Stay, Guests From Afar" alongside Jackie Chan and Emil Chau during its closing ceremony. In addition, Lau, who has been supporting disabled athletes in Hong Kong for more than a decade, was appointed as the Goodwill ambassador for the 2008 Summer Paralympics. He led other performers in singing and performing the song "Everyone is No.1" at the Beijing National Stadium before the 2008 Paralympics opening ceremony began. He also sang the theme song Flying with the Dream with Han Hong during the Paralympics opening ceremony on 6 September 2008.

In 2022, Lau set records when an online concert he held via Douyin attracted more than 350 million viewers.

In addition to singing in Cantonese and Mandarin, Lau has also sung in other languages such as English, Japanese, and Taiwanese Hokkien. He has held concerts in Asia, North America, Western Europe, and Oceania, and toured throughout mainland China in summer 2024.

=== Bibliography ===
Lau has written two books, This Is How I Grew Up (我是這樣長大的) (1995), an autobiography, and My 30 Work Days (我的30個工作天) (2012), a collection of his 30 personal diaries written while working on the 2011 film A Simple Life.

=== Art exhibition ===
In 2023, Lau opened his debut art show titled the 1/X Andy Lau X Art Exhibition, which ran on 25 August at the Freespace venue located in the West Kowloon Cultural District. The exhibit includes a sculpture which Lau designed, a projection of images from his films and concerts, paintings made by him and his daughter, and works where he collaborated with other artists, such as collaborating with Hong Kong artists Sticky Line on a statue of his character from Running on Karma (2003), collaborating with Beijing artist Xu Zhuoer in glass covered film props from A Moment of Romance (1990), and a collaboration with ink painter where Lau showcases his calligraphy.

=== Doctoral Degree ===
In 2026, Lau was conferred the degree of Doctor of Letters (honoris causa) by the Hong Kong Baptist University. He was commended for his outstanding professional achievements and remarkable contributions to society.

== Philanthropy ==
In 1994, Lau established the Andy Lau Charity Foundation which helps people in need and promotes a wide range of youth education services. In 1999, he received the Ten Outstanding Young Persons of the World award, being the third person from Hong Kong at that time to receive this distinguished honour. In 2008, Lau took a main role in putting together the Artistes 512 Fund Raising Campaign for relief toward the victims of the 2008 Sichuan earthquake.

== Personal life ==
Lau had two public relationships. In the fall of 1983, while filming Shanghai 13 in Taiwan, Lau was introduced to actress Yu Ke-Hsin. The two began a relationship that lasted for three years. Following the example of Jackie Chan and Joan Lin, they signed a symbolic "marriage certificate" that held no legal validity in Taiwan. Their relationship ended when Carol Chu appeared, and eight years after their breakup, Lau started dating Chu. In 2005, Yu published a memoir in which she detailed her romance with Lau. She revealed that they had agreed to meet again ten years after their breakup and Lau honored the pact by visiting her home in Los Angeles, ringing the doorbell, and claiming that media reports about his relationship with Chu were untrue. This led to a brief rekindling of their relationship. Yu's mother later alleged that all 5,000 copies of the memoir sold in Hong Kong were purchased in bulk to prevent them from reaching store shelves. The books were subsequently returned in full, causing a financial loss of HKD 500,000.

In 2008, Lau secretly married Carol Chu in Las Vegas and acknowledged his marriage the following year, ending decades of speculation over their relationship. Both Lau and Chu are vegetarians and Buddhists. On 9 May 2012, Chu gave birth to their daughter Hanna.

In January 2017, Lau sustained a serious pelvic injury after being thrown off and stomped on by a horse during a commercial shoot in Thailand. He made a full recovery by the end of the year.

== Awards and nominations ==
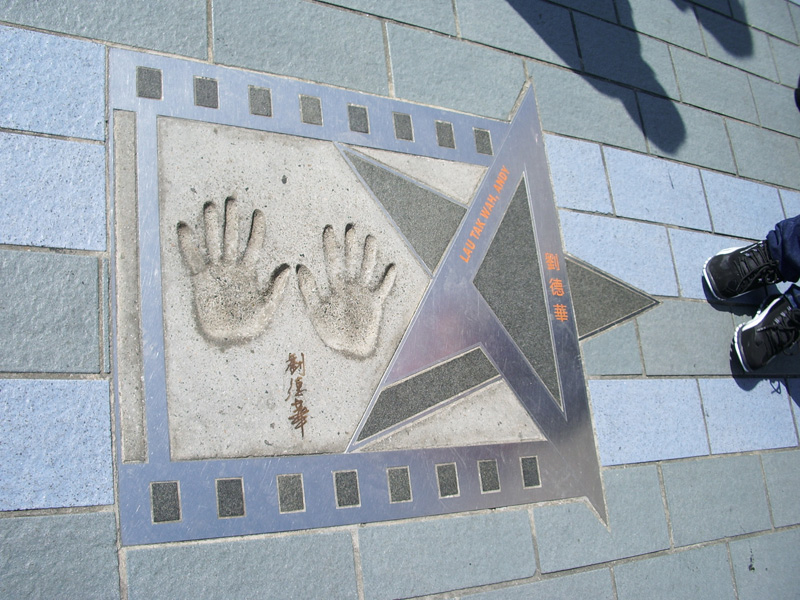
Lau's hand print and autograph at the Avenue of Stars in Hong Kong

Year	Award	Category	Nominated work	Result
1983	Hong Kong Film Awards	Best New Performer	Boat People	Nominated
1989	Hong Kong Film Awards	Best Actor	As Tears Go By	Nominated
1990	Golden Horse Film Festival	Best Supporting Actor	Kawashima Yoshiko	Nominated
1992	Hong Kong Film Awards	Best Actor	Lee Rock	Nominated
1992	Hong Kong Film Awards	Best Original Film Song (Singer)	Casino Raiders II	Nominated
1995	Hong Kong Film Awards	Best Original Film Song (Singer)	Tian Di	Nominated
1996	Hong Kong Film Awards	Best Actor	Full Throttle	Nominated
1996	Hong Kong Film Awards	Best Original Film Song (Singer/Lyricist)	Full Throttle	Nominated
1998	Hong Kong Film Awards	Best Film (Producer)	Made in Hong Kong	Won
1998	Hong Kong Film Awards	Best Original Film Song (Singer)	Island of Greed	Nominated
1999	Hong Kong Film Awards	Best Original Film Song (Singer)	The Longest Summer	Nominated
1999	Hong Kong Film Awards	Best Original Film Song (Singer)	A True Mob Story	Nominated
1999	Hong Kong Film Awards	Best Film (Producer)	The Longest Summer	Nominated
2000	Hong Kong Film Awards	Best Actor	Running Out of Time	Won
2000	Golden Bauhinia Awards	Best Actor	Running Out of Time	Nominated
2001	Hong Kong Film Awards	Best Actor	A Fighter's Blues	Nominated
2001	Golden Bauhinia Awards	Best Actor	A Fighter's Blues	Won
2001	Golden Horse Film Festival	Best Actor	Love on a Diet	Nominated
2002	Hong Kong Film Awards	Best Actor	Love on a Diet	Nominated
2002	Hong Kong Film Awards	Best Original Film Song (Singer/Lyricist)	Shaolin Soccer	Nominated
2003	Hong Kong Film Awards	Best Actor	Infernal Affairs	Nominated
2003	Hong Kong Film Awards	Best Original Film Song (Singer with Tony Leung)	Infernal Affairs	Won
2003	Golden Horse Film Festival	Best Actor	Infernal Affairs	Nominated
2003	Golden Bauhinia Awards	Best Actor	Infernal Affairs	Nominated
2004	Hong Kong Film Awards	Best Actor	Running on Karma	Won
2004	Golden Horse Film Festival	Best Actor	Infernal Affairs III	Won
2004	Golden Bauhinia Awards	Best Actor	Infernal Affairs III	Nominated
2004	Golden Bauhinia Awards	Best Actor	Running on Karma	Nominated
2005	Golden Bauhinia Awards	Best Actor	A World Without Thieves	Nominated
2006	Hong Kong Film Awards	Best Actor	Wait 'Til You're Older	Nominated
2006	Hong Kong Film Awards	Best Original Film Song (Singer/Lyricist)	Wait 'Til You're Older	Nominated
2006	Golden Bauhinia Awards	Best Actor	Wait 'Til You're Older	Nominated
2007	Hong Kong Film Awards	Best Asian Film (Producer)	Crazy Stone	Nominated
2007	Golden Bauhinia Awards	Best Actor	Battle of Wits	Nominated
2007	Asian Film Awards	Best Actor	Battle of Wits	Nominated
2008	Hong Kong Film Awards	Best Supporting Actor	Protégé	Won
2008	Hong Kong Film Awards	Best Actor	The Warlords	Nominated
2008	Hong Kong Film Awards	Best Original Film Song (Singer with Eason Chan/Lyricist)	Brothers	Nominated
2011	Hong Kong Film Awards	Best Film (Producer)	Gallants	Won
2011	Golden Horse Film Festival	Best Actor	A Simple Life	Won
2012	Hong Kong Film Awards	Best Film (Producer)	A Simple Life	Won
2012	Hong Kong Film Awards	Best Actor	A Simple Life	Won
2012	Hong Kong Film Awards	Best Original Film Song (Singer/Lyricist)	Shaolin	Nominated
2012	Asian Film Awards	Best Actor	A Simple Life	Nominated
2014	Hong Kong Film Awards	Best Original Film Song (Singer with Sammi Cheng)	Blind Detective	Nominated
2015	Golden Rooster Awards	Best Actor	Lost and Love	Nominated
2016	Hong Kong Film Awards	Best Actor	Lost and Love	Nominated
2016	Huabiao Awards	Best Actor	Lost and Love	Won
2018	Hong Kong Film Awards	Best Film (Producer)	Chasing the Dragon	Nominated
2018	Hong Kong Film Awards	Best Film (Producer)	Shock Wave	Nominated
2018	Hong Kong Film Awards	Best Actor	Shock Wave	Nominated
2021	Huading Awards	Best Actor	Shock Wave 2	Won

== Honors ==
Lau was noted for his highly positive energy, his hard work and active involvement in charity works throughout his 30 years in showbiz and honoured as a "Justice of Peace" by the Hong Kong SAR government in 2008. In May 2010, he received the "World Outstanding Chinese" award and an "honorary doctorate" from the University of New Brunswick, Canada. On 14 December 2017, Lau was awarded a Doctor of Letters degree from the Hong Kong Shue Yan University, with the citation highlighting his popularity among locals which stated: "His low-key, modest, friendly and approachable personality has endeared him to millions of fans and ordinary folks alike, who also consider him to be a 'heartthrob' and the 'unofficial Chief Executive of Hong Kong'".

In 2018, asteroid 55381 Lautakwah, discovered by Bill Yeung at the Desert Eagle Observatory in 2001, was named for Lau. The asteroid measures approximately 8.5 kilometers (5.3 miles) in diameter and is located in the outermost region of the asteroid belt, just inside the Hecuba gap. The official naming citation was published by the Minor Planet Center on 11 July 2018.

In 2023, Lau was presented with a Special Tribute award at 2023 Toronto International Film Festival.

== Concert tours ==
- Andy Lau First Tour (1991)
- Love's Space Tour (1992)
- Satchi Tour (1993)
- True Forever Tour (1995)
- Reverse the Earth Tour (1996)
- Love You For Ten Thousand Years Tour (1999)
- Andy Lau 2000 Tour (2000)
- Summer Fiesta Tour (2001)
- Proud of You Tour (2002)
- Vision Tour (2004–2005)
- Wonderful World Tour (2007–2009)
- Unforgettable Tour (2010–2011)
- Always World Tour (2013)
- My Love World Tour (2018–2020)
- Today... is the Day Tour (2024–2025)

== See also ==
- Andy Lau filmography

== Awards and achievements ==
Awards and achievements
Jade Solid Gold Best Ten Music Awards Presentation
Preceded by Leslie Cheung	Most Popular Male Artist; 1990–1992; Andy Lau	Succeeded by Leon Lai
Preceded by None	Asia Pacific Most Popular Hong Kong Male Artist; 1993; Andy Lau	Succeeded by Jacky Cheung
Preceded by Leon Lai	Most Popular Male Artist; 1994; Andy Lau	Succeeded by Leon Lai
Preceded by Jacky Cheung	Asia Pacific Most Popular Hong Kong Male Artist; 1995–1996; Andy Lau	Succeeded by Jacky Cheung
Preceded by Aaron Kwok	Most Popular Male Artist; 1999; Andy Lau	Succeeded by Aaron Kwok
Preceded by Aaron Kwok	Asia Pacific Most Popular Hong Kong Male Artist; 2000–2006; Andy Lau	Succeeded by Eason Chan
Preceded by Hacken Lee	Most Popular Male Artist; 2004; Andy Lau	Succeeded by Hacken Lee
Hong Kong Film Awards
Preceded by Anthony Wong Chau-sang for Beast Cops	Best Actor; 2000; Andy Lau for Running Out of Time	Succeeded by Tony Leung Chiu-wai for In the Mood for Love
Preceded by Tony Leung Chiu-wai for Infernal Affairs	Best Actor; 2004; Andy Lau for Running on Karma	Succeeded by Tony Leung Chiu-wai for 2046
Preceded by Gouw Ian Iskandar for After This Our Exile	Best Supporting Actor; 2008; Andy Lau for Protégé	Succeeded by Liu Kai-chi for the Beast Stalker
Ming Pao Power Academy Awards
Preceded by None	Honorary Award; 2000; Andy Lau & Leslie Cheung	Succeeded by Stephen Chow
Preceded by None	Outstanding Actor in Film; 2000; Andy Lau for Needing You...	Succeeded by Andy Lau for Love on a Diet
Preceded by Andy Lau for Needing You...	Outstanding Actor in Film; 2001; Andy Lau for Love on a Diet	Succeeded by Leslie Cheung for Inner Senses
Preceded by Leon Lai	Performance Power Award; 2001; Andy Lau	Succeeded by Jessica Hsuan; Shing Ka-ying
Preceded by Leslie Cheung for Inner Senses	Outstanding Actor in Film; 2003; Andy Lau for Running on Karma	Succeeded by Jacky Cheung for Golden Chicken 2
Preceded by Leo Ku	Performance Power Award; 2005; Andy Lau	Succeeded by vacant
Preceded by Liza Wang; Franco Yuen	Honorary Award; 2006; Andy Lau	Succeeded by vacant
