= Overheard 2 =

2011 Hong Kong film by Derek Yee

- Film poster
- Traditional Chinese: 竊聽風雲2
- Simplified Chinese: 窃听风云2
- Hanyu Pinyin: Qiètīng Fēng Yún Èr
- Jyutping: Sit3 Ting3 Fung1 Wan1 Ji6
- Directed by: Alan Mak; Felix Chong
- Written by: Alan Mak; Felix Chong
- Produced by: Derek Yee
- Starring: Louis Koo; Lau Ching-wan; Daniel Wu
- Cinematography: Anthony Pun; Chan Kwok-Hung; Jack Lam
- Edited by: Curran Pang
- Music by: Chan Kwong-wing
- Production companies: Sil-Metropole Organisation; Bona Entertainment; Pop Movies
- Distributed by: Distribution Workshop
- Release date: 18 August 2011
- Running time: 121 minutes
- Country: Hong Kong
- Language: Cantonese
- Budget: HK$8 million
- Box office: US$38,119,511

Overheard 2 is a 2011 Hong Kong crime thriller film produced by Derek Yee, written and directed by Alan Mak and Felix Chong and starring Louis Koo, Lau Ching-wan and Daniel Wu. It is a sequel to the 2009 film Overheard where Koo, Lau and Wu play different roles with a different storyline, but the key elements of the first film are kept. Another sequel, Overheard 3, was released on 30 May 2014.

Production started in February and filming lasted for three months. A press conference was held during the 2011 Shanghai International Film Festival on 10 June. The film was released on 18 August in China, Hong Kong, and Singapore.

== Plot ==
Manson Lo, the head broker of Man Sang Securities is shown giving his prediction of the Hong Kong stock market on television. Through the viewpoint of an eavesdropper, it is revealed that Lo works for five of the richest in Hong Kong to manipulate the prices of shares in the stock market. When leaving his office, he realizes that he is being tailed (by Joe Sze-ma) and though successful in shaking off the tail, is involved in a traffic accident.

Inspector Jack Ho and his team discover a military grade eavesdropping device upon examining Lo's Ferrari. Ho later visits Lo in hospital and attempts to ask him questions but Lo denies knowledge of being followed and evades the other questions at the advice of Emily, his wife and lawyer. Lo's past is revealed by Ho – Lo's firm owed the bank money but because of the stock market crash, Lo instead made a lot of money and then became the broker to the five.

In his office, Lo reveals to Emily that he was being followed. She then tells him about Inspector Ho's history – not much is known about his previous cases in the police force but his wife (Tsui Foon) was a lawyer that went to jail for using clients' money to pay off debts after losing money in the stock market, with him being the one that aided in her arrest.

Ho then enters the room and scans the opposing buildings. After noticing something at Diamond House, he directs Tsui Hoi and Fanny to proceed there. However, as Ho was about to go there with more men, the suspect (Joe Sze-ma) escapes, injuring Ho's subordinate, Hoyt Tsui. A chase then ensues. Joe sets off some flares and eventually manages to injure Ho and escape via a bus for elderly living in a home for those with dementia. It is revealed that Joe's mother (Mrs. Sze-ma) is a resident in the nursing home.

Mrs. Sze-ma regains her memory temporarily and asks Joe if he has managed to track Tony down and Joe says no. Soon after, her memory lapses and she starts addressing Joe as her husband and speaks to him of the good times they had together.

Ho and his team are shown combing the apartment at Diamond House. They have traced the identity of the person that rented the apartment to a Kim So but found that he is apparently no longer in Hong Kong, having migrated to Canada. Here, it is revealed that Tsui Foon is Hoyt Tsui's sister.

Lo is shown to be meeting the four rich men (without Tony). Manson reveals to them that his car and home were bugged for over a month. Tony calls and Lo reveals the number plate of the vehicle. Tony is then seen instructing his chief underling, Caine to get someone to take care of matters. Lo and the rest are later photographed leaving the hotel.

At home, Lo has a flashback. Intertwined with the story from the hotel manager, Lo is shown meeting Fred of Nixon Electronics, whom he urges to approach a loan shark to borrow fifty million to avoid a hostile takeover by Americans. It was upon knowing how Lo tried to help Fred, that Lo was invited by Chauncey Sze-ma (Joe's father) to join the six men, known collectively as the Landlord Club. It was also revealed that Chauncey Sze-ma was eventually convicted for insider trading and because of that, expelled from the club.

Ho and Hoyt Tsui are seen picking up Tsui Foon after her release from prison. Tsui Foon blames Ho for her time in jail and asks for a separation from Ho, (which Ho reluctantly agrees to) Hoyt Tsui then tells Ho that the police have received a package.

Lo receives the same package – in it is a phone with a voice recording of Lo receiving instructions to manipulate the share price of a stock. Lo then realizes his house was being watched. Joe is pictured heading to the carpark near Lo's place where some men attempt to beat him up. He flees successfully but is eventually thrown over a ledge and saved by Ho. Joe turns the tables, holding Ho at gunpoint and questioning him about the inaction of the police before handcuffing Ho to a scaffolding and leaving in Ho's vehicle, not before hinting to Ho that something would happen to the stock market in the next few days.

Later, Lo recalls that he first saw Joe at Sze-ma Cheung's funeral. Lo then receives a call that there is a game on tomorrow and he should attend it. Ho heads home after being told his car was found at the gate. He finds a plastic tag in the car and his wife is witnessed walking out of the house. He later learns from Hoyt Tsui that she is leaving and plans to sell the house and go to a trading firm. Joe is later seen to be tailing Tsui Hoi.

The next day, Ho goes to Lo's office and helps him pay for a gift. When Ho asks Lo what the Landlord Club does, Law refuses to answer but instead starts trading. Later, Lo directs Ho to sign a contract for opening an account. Lo then tells Ho that a typical account opening at his firm would cost $500 000 but he is only charging Ho $100, the cost of the gift that Ho paid for.

Ho then says that the Landlord Club is powerful and since Joe is stepping on their tail, they can easily kill him. Ho reveals that he knows that the Landlord Club deals in illegal funds from conflicts. However, Lo does not seem to know that the Landlord Club has arranged for Joe to be killed and Ho asks to talk to the Landlord Club. Then, Joe calls Lo and Lo asks Ho to leave. Joe asks Lo to record the conversation he has with Tony later and assures him that the phone he was given is secure. Ho tries to get Fanny to track the call but she is unable to.

Later, Fanny briefs Ho that the 3 ID cards found in the various scenes were all registered on the same day but to different people. In the evening, the police tail Lo but lose his tail after Lo gets his subordinate to take his car. Lo heads to the docks to meet his wife but is instead invited on board a yacht along with the other rich men to Tony's mansion.

Tony reveals that the eavesdropper is Joe, who is Chauncey Sze-ma's son. Later, he contacts Joe from a number indicated at the back of all the cellphones of the other rich men, after confiscating them upon realizing they were all the same brand. Joe tells Tony he wants 50 million shares of stock 749 to be deposited in Man Seng Securities by tomorrow. Tony instructs the rest of get the shares and after they leave, asks Lo if he can still trust him because Lo was brought in by Chauncey Sze-ma, and now Joe, Sze-ma's son, wants to go after them. Lo says he can be trusted because he does not want to go to jail. Later, Lo arrives home to find Ho and his team at the gate. When he gets to his apartment, he is held at gunpoint by Joe, who asks about the cashing of the cheque Lo once passed to Chauncey Sze-ma. Joe demands that Lo keeps his word to his Dad about being able to cash the cheque when he needed money.

In the night, Ho arrives at the nursing home and speaks to its director. The director explains to Ho that a tag found in Ho's car after Joe took it is supposed to contain a GPS tracker so that Alzheimer's patients can be tracked The number attached to the empty tag, G-41, is Mrs Szema's bed number.

The next day, Joe asks Ho to open a bag by Mrs Sze-ma's bedside and Ho discovers photos of his wife inside. Meanwhile, Lo, through Man Seng, is engaged in buying stock 749. The Landlord Club realizes that Joe is controlling the price because he owns a lot of the shares. Joe is later caught by Brother Kam & brought to Tony's mansion. At the same time, Hoyt Tsui discovers that the names of those on 3 IDs cards previously discovered were actually managers of stock 749, which was the nursing home fund. They then reveal that Sze-ma Cheung used to be their fund manager and that they are just taking their revenge on Tony.

The purchase of stock 749 continues after Joe reveals that he would upload recorded conversations of the rich men giving instructions to manipulate share prices onto a highly subscribed website. Joe also reveals that he gave some of stock 749 to Ho. Later, Tony reveals that he ordered Chauncey Sze-ma to be killed in prison and when Joe admits that he did not actually upload any recordings to any website but just wanted to continue to blackmail the rich men, Tony shoots and kills Joe.

Ho successfully rescues Tsui Foon in an apartment after Emily passes him the keys. She passes him a phone that has GPS coordinates of Joe's location and Ho and his team eventually discovers Caine and his men burying Joe. Tony is eventually arrested based on the recording that Joe obtained through the military grade device that he has been using to bug the rich men, which was embedded in his arm.

Upon his release from prison, Lo approaches the nursing home where Mrs Sze-ma is housed at and offers to be their fund manager. He meets Ho there, who advises him to take good care of Mrs Sze-ma. The film ends with a flashback of Mrs Sze-ma happily watching a film with Sze-ma Cheung and Joe sitting beside her.

== Cast ==
- Louis Koo as Jack Ho Chi-keung (何智強), Senior Inspector of the Security Wing
- Lau Ching-wan as Manson Lo Man-sang (羅敏生), a Hong Kong stock broker
- Daniel Wu as Joe Sze-ma Nim-cho (司馬念祖), a US Airforce veteran
- Michelle Ye as Tsui Foon (徐歡), Jack Ho Chi-keung's wife
- Huang Yi as Emily Kwok Lai-ping (郭麗萍), Manson Lo Man-sang's wife
- Wilfred Lau as Hoyt Tsui Hoi (徐海), Jack Ho Chi-keung's subordinate and Tsui Foon's younger brother
- Kenneth Tsang as Tony Wong Sai-tung (黃世同)
- Bowie Wu as Chauncey Sze-ma Cheung (司馬祥), Joe Sze-ma Nim-cho's father
- Felix Lok as Jim Chan Chim (陳占)
- Kong Ngai as Sherwin Mak Sing-wan (麥聖雲)
- Ben Yuen as Ma Cheuk-kwan (馬卓群)
- Alex Fong as Simon, a hotel manager
- Kwok Fung as Lam Yun-kan (林潤柬)
- Lisa Chiao Chiao as Mrs. Sze-ma (司馬太太), Joe Sze-ma Nim-cho's mother who suffers from Alzheimer's disease and resides in a sanatorium
- Matt Chow as Tinker (阿挺), Manson Lo Man-sang's subordinate
- Dion Lam as Caine (錦哥), Tony Wong Sai-tung's chief underling and a security expert
- Patricia Tang
- Andrew Rizkalla as Western Businessman #1)
- Patrick Brzeski as Western Businessman #2)

== Award nominations ==
- 31st Hong Kong Film Awards
  - Nominated: Best Film
  - Nominated: Best Director (Alan Mak, Felix Chong)
  - Nominated: Best Screenplay (Alan Mak, Felix Chong)
  - Nominated: Best Actor (Lau Ching-wan)
  - Nominated: Best Supporting Actor (Kenneth Tsang)
  - Nominated: Best Cinematography (Fletcher Poon)
  - Nominated: Best Film Editing (Curran Pang)
  - Nominated: Best Sound Design (Kinson Tsang)
  - Nominated: Best Original Film Score (Chan Kwong-wing)
