= Lai Yiu-fai =

Hong Kong cinematographer

Lai Yiu-fai (Chinese: 黎耀輝) is a Hong Kong cinematographer.

== Awards ==
Year	Award	Category	Work	Result	Ref
2003	Hong Kong Film Awards	Best Cinematography	Infernal Affairs	Nominated	
2004	Valladolid International Film Festival	Best Photography Direction Award	2046	Won	
2005	Hong Kong Film Awards	Best Cinematography	2046	Won	
2005	New York Film Critics Circle Awards	Best Cinematographer	2046	Won	
2006	Hong Kong Film Awards	Best Cinematography	Initial D	Nominated	
2006	National Society of Film Critics Awards	Best Cinematography	2046	Won	
2007	Hong Kong Film Awards	Best Cinematography	Confession of Pain	Won	
2012	Asia Pacific Screen Awards	Achievement in Cinematography	Dragon	Nominated	
2012	Hong Kong Film Awards	Best Cinematography	Dragon	Won	
