= UFO Record =

Taiwanese record label

- Native name: 飛碟企業股份有限公司
- Company type: Record company
- Industry: Music
- Founded: December 1, 1982
- Defunct: December 31, 1998; 27 years ago
- Successor: Warner Music Taiwan
- Headquarters: Taipei
- Key people: Wu Chu-chu, Peng Kuo-Hua, Yiu Fung-kong, Lam Shan Shan
- Products: Music Records
- Owner: Warner Music Group (May 1, 1991 - present)

UFO Record (Mandarin: 飛碟企業股份有限公司) was the predecessor of Warner Music Taiwan, and once ranked alongside Rock Records as one of the two biggest names in Taiwan's recording industry in the 1980s

== History ==
UFO Record was founded on December 1, 1982 by Wu Chu-chu (Mandarin: 吳楚楚) and Peng Kuo-Hua (Mandarin: 彭國華), who originally worked at Rock Records. UFO Record's first release was the album "David Tao 1983: Gaga Ooo-La-La-La".

In 1983, UFO Record released Su Rui's self-titled debut album, which not only made Su Rui popular, but also laid the foundation for the future development of UFO Record: in addition to the successful release of newcomers such as Zhang Yusheng, Dave Wang Chieh, Yeh Huan, Worrying Party, Stars, Moon, Sun, and the Xiao Hu Dui, well-known singers such as Tsai Chin, Tsai Hsing Kuen, Jiang Yuheng, Wang Zhilei, and Huang Ying Ying were also able to successfully re-establish their singing careers under the creation of UFO Record, which made UFO Record one of the two major label icons in the 1980's, alongside Rock Records.

On June 1, 1990, UFO Record ceased production of vinyl records, and on May 1, 1991, Warner Music Group came to Taiwan to acquire part of UFO Record's shareholding in a joint venture, and Warner Records Hong Kong cooperated with UFO Record, and the Mandarin recordings of Hong Kong Warner singers, such as Lui Fong, Sandy Lam, Sally Yeh, Lin Tzu-cheung, and Chun-Tao Chung, were all distributed by UFO Record.

In 1995, due to differences in business philosophy between UFO Record and Warner Music Group, the original management team of UFO Record left the company and established Forward Music (Mandarin: 豐華唱片). On January 1, 1996, Warner Music Group acquired UFO Record and renamed it "Warner UFO Taiwan" (Mandarin: 華納飛碟). In the chaos of personnel changes, Warner Disc's business performance and market share fell into a slump in mid-1997, with many of its singers jumping ship or not renewing their contracts upon expiration, leaving it with only two iconic singers, Sammi Cheng and Aaron Kwok, at one point.

On January 1, 1997, the former General Manager of the Art Deco era, Mr. Chow Kin Fai, assumed the position of General Manager of Warner Phillips and began a corporate reorganization of Warner Phillips, On January 1, 1999, and was renamed as "Warner Music Taiwan" (Mandarin: 華納國際音樂股份有限公司), the former corporate logo of Warner Discs officially disappeared into history.
