= 2006 World University Championships =

The 2006 World University Championships are the World Championships organized by the International University Sports Federation (FISU) in 2006. 27 World University Championships were organized attracting 5,852 participants from a total of 209 (of which 90 different) countries.

== Archery ==
The 6th World University Archery Championship took place in Viničné, Slovakia, from 14 to 17 June 2006.

Event	Gold	Silver	Bronze
Men's events
Recurve details	Jong Young Lee (KOR)	Cheng-Wei Kuo (TPE)	Yaroslav Mokrynsyy (UKR)
Compound details	Braden Gellenthien (USA)	Sergio Pagni (ITA)	Sebastien Brasseur (FRA)
Women's events
Recurve details	Hiroko Lee Taguma (JPN)	Kateryna Ksenofontova (UKR)	Justyna Mospinek (POL)
Compound details	Amandine Bouillot (FRA)	Hyo Sun Kim (KOR)	Anna Stratton (USA)

== Badminton ==
The 9th World University Badminton Championship took place in Wuhan, China, from 10 to 15 October 2006.

Event	Gold	Silver	Bronze
Men's events
Singles details	Boonsak Ponsana (THA)	Hu Yun (CHN)	
Doubles details	Patapol Ngernsrisuk (THA); Sudket Prapakamol (THA)	Wang Wei (CHN); Zhang Wei (CHN)	
Women's events
Singles details	Cheng Shao-chieh (TPE)	Soratja Chansrisukot (THA)	
Doubles details	Zou Shisi (CHN); Li Shasha (CHN)	Kunchala Voravichitchaikul (THA); Sathinee Chankrachangwong (THA)	
Mixed event
Doubles details	Kunchala Voravichitchaikul (THA); Sudket Prapakamol (THA)	Cheng Wen-hsing (TPE); Tsai Chia-hsin (TPE)	

== Baseball ==
The 3rd World University Baseball Championship took place in Havana, Cuba, from 6 to 16 August 2006.

Event	Gold	Silver	Bronze
Men's events
Men's	United States	Chinese Taipei	Cuba

== Beach Volleyball ==
The 3rd World University Beach Volleyball Championship took place in Protaras, Cyprus, from 14 to 18 June 2006.

Event	Gold	Silver	Bronze
Men's events
Men's details	Switzerland 1	Germany 1	United States 1
Women's events
Women's details	France 2	Germany 2	Germany 1

== Boxing ==
The 2nd World University Boxing Championship took place in Almaty, Kazakhstan, from 2 to 9 October 2006.

Event	Gold	Silver	Bronze	
Men's events
-48 kg	(Kazakhstan) Nurlan Abdraimov	(Ukraine) Aleksander Gritshuk	(Mongolia) Jigjid Otgonbayar	
-51 kg	(Kazakhstan) Andrei Spiridonov	(Tajikistan) Anvar Yunusov	(Mongolia) Pueruvoris Seramba	
-54 kg	(Mongolia) Enkhbatyn Badar-Uugan	(Kazakhstan) Yerzhan Omirzhanov	(Tajikistan) Bakhodur Karimov	(Turkey) Hüseyin Dündar
-57 kg	(Uzbekistan) Abdugaffar Umarov	(Russia) Araik Ambartsumov	(Kazakhstan) Madi Shulakov	(Turkey) Çetin Özdemir
-60 kg	(Russia) Ivan Lopatin	(Kazakhstan) Askarbek Kalpakov	(Turkey) Mustafa Doğan	(Mongolia) Uranchimegiin Mönkh-Erdene
-64 kg	(Uzbekistan) Darkhan Ashirov	(Russia) Dmitry Mikhailenko	(Mongolia) Byambyn Tüvshinbat	(Uzbekistan) Zakir Artykov
-69 kg	(Kazakhstan) Bakhyt Sarsekbayev	(Russia) Maksim Koptyakov	(Mongolia) Chuluntumur Tomorkhuyal	(Serbia) Aleksander Drenovak
-75 kg	(Kazakhstan) Dauren Yeleusinov	(Russia) Aleksi Tsherbakov	(Moldova) Igor Konobeyev	(Turkey) Kaya Sakaş
-81 kg	(Kazakhstan) Yerdos Dzhanabergenov	(Turkey) Bahram Muzaffer	(Azerbaijan) Zaur Teimurov	(Tajikistan) Jakhon Banov
-91 kg	(Lithuania) Vitalijus Subačius	(Moldova) Mikhail Muntyan	(Turkey) Erhan Şentürk	(Kazakhstan) Yevgnei Yegemberdiev
+91 kg	(Russia) Magomed Abdussalamov	(Turkey) Deniz Fidan	(Moldova) Denis Ursu	(Kazakhstan) Kanat Altayev

== Bridge ==
The 3rd World University Bridge Championship took place in Tianjin City, China, from 21 to 26 October 2006.

Event	Gold	Silver	Bronze
Mixed event
Bridge	China (A team); Liu Shu, Wang Yan, Liu Jing, Jin Jin, Li Xin, Liu Yan	United States	Poland (B team)

== Chess ==
The 9th World University Chess Championship took place in Lagos, Nigeria.

== Cross Country ==
The 15th World University Cross Country Championship took place in Algiers, Algeria.

== Cycling ==
The 4th World University Cycling Championship took place in Antwerp and Herentals, Belgium, from 22 to 26 March 2006.

=== Road Cycling ===
Event	Gold		Silver		Bronze	
Men's events
Road Race details	Yvo Kusters; Netherlands	3h 08' 00"	Michiel Van Aelbroeck; Belgium	s.t.	Malaya van Ruitenbeek; Netherlands	s.t.
Time trial details	Malaya van Ruitenbeek; Netherlands	32' 39.55"	Tobias Erler; Germany	+ 1.13"	Michiel Van Aelbroeck; Belgium	+ 41.79"
Women's events
Road Race	Ellen van Dijk; Netherlands	2h 21' 00"	Eva Lutz; Germany	s.t.	Ludivine Henrion; Belgium	s.t.
Time trial	Loes Gunnewijk; Netherlands	18' 11.66"	Ellen van Dijk; Netherlands	+ 28.50"	Verena Joos; Germany	+ 43.62"

=== Cyclo-cross ===
Event	Gold		Silver		Bronze	
Men's event
Cyclo-cross race details	Sebastian Hannöver; Germany	48' 46"	Axel Bult; Netherlands	+ 1"	Tom van den Bosch; Belgium	+ 13"

== Equestrian ==
The 7th World University Equestrian Championship took place in La Rochelle, France.

== Canoe Slalom ==
The 5th World University Wild Water Canoeing Championship took place in Kraków, Poland, from 7 to 10 September 2006.

Event	Gold	Silver	Bronze
Men's events
K1 Slalom details	Ivan Pišvejc (CZE)	Michael Kurt (SUI)	Daniele Molmenti (ITA)
K1 Descent details	Jon Schofield (GBR)	Tomáš Slovák (CZE)	Dawid Knebel (CZE)
C1 Slalom details	David Florence (GBR)	Alexander Slafkovský (SVK)	Grzegorz Wójs (POL)
C2 Slalom details	Paweł Sarna (POL); Marcin Pochwała (POL)	Peter Škantár (SVK); Ladislav Škantár (SVK)	Václav Hradilek (CZE); Štěpán Sehnal (CZE)
Women's events
K1 Slalom details	Jana Dukátová (SVK)	Marie Řihošková (CZE)	Gabriela Stacherová (SVK)
K1 Descent details	Michaela Mrůzková (CZE)	Jana Dukátová (SVK)	Lenka Lagnerova (CZE)

== Floorball ==
The 2nd World University Floorball Championship took place in Bern, Switzerland.

== Futsal ==
The 10th World University Futsal Championship took place in Poznań, Poland.

== Golf ==
The 11th World University Golf Championship took place in Turin, Italy.

== Handball ==
The 18th World University Handball Championship took place in Gdańsk, Poland.

== Karate ==
The 5th World University Karate Championship took place in New York City, United States.

== Match Racing ==
The 3rd World University Match Racing Championship took place in Palma de Mallorca, Spain.

== Orienteering ==
The 15th World University Orienteering Championship took place in Košice, Slovakia, from 14 to 20 August 2006.

== Rowing ==
The 9th World University Rowing Championship took place in Trakai, Lithuania.

== Rugby Sevens ==
The 2nd World University Rugby Sevens Championship took place in Rome, Italy.

== Softball ==
The 2nd World University Softball Championship took place in Tainan City, Taiwan.

Event	Gold	Silver	Bronze
Men's events
Men's	United States	Chinese Taipei	Japan

== Squash ==
The 5th World University Squash Championship took place in Szeged, Hungary.

Event	Gold	Silver	Bronze
Men’s events
Singles	Chris Ryder (GBR)	Márk Krajcsák (HUN)	Joel Hinds (GBR)
Women’s events
Singles	Lim Yoke Wah (MAS)	Kathrin Rohrmuller (GER)	Lauren Siddal (GBR)
Team event
Men/Women’s Team	(United Kingdom) Great Britain	France	South Africa

== Taekwondo ==
The 9th World University Taekwondo Championship took place in Valencia, Spain.

== Triathlon ==
The 9th World University Triathlon Championship took place in Lausanne, Switzerland.

== Woodball ==
The 1st World University Woodball Championship took place in Taipei City, Taiwan.

== Wrestling ==
The 7th World University Wrestling Championship took place in Ulaanbaatar, Mongolia.
