= Lehize Hilal Benli =

Turkish martial artist

- Born: 1990 (age 35–36)
- Nationality: Turkish
- Style: Kick boxing, Muay Thai and Sanshou

Other information
- Notable clubs: Ergenekon Sport Club, Adana

Lehize Hilal Benli
Medal record

Representing Turkey

Women's Wushu - Sanshou

European Championships
Silver medal – second place	2010 Antalya	56 kg

European Junior Championships
Gold medal – first place	2007 Warsaw	56 kg

Lehize Hilal Benli (born in 1990) is a Turkish female martial artist competing in the Muay Thai, Kickboxing and wushu.

== Early life ==
She began practising wushu at the age of 15.

== Achievements ==
Wushu

- Gold (56 kg) 3rd European Junior Wushu Championships - October 4–7, 2007, Warsaw, Poland
- Gold (56 kg) 2008 National Wushu Championships - July 17–20, 2008, Ordu, Turkey
- Silver (56 kg) 2009 National Wushu Championships - July 24–26, 2008, Safranbolu, Turkey
- Silver (56 kg) 13th European Wushu Championships - March 6–13, 2010, Antalya, Turkey
