= Wushu at the 2010 Asian Games – Men's sanshou 75 kg =

Men's sanshou 75 kg at the 2010 Asian Games
- Venue: Nansha Gymnasium
- Dates: 13–17 November 2010
- Competitors: 9 from 9 nations

Medalists
| gold medal | Hamid Reza Gholipour | Iran |
| silver medal | Ijaz Ahmed | Pakistan |
| bronze medal | Jiang Chunpeng | China |
| bronze medal | Magsarjavyn Batjargal | Mongolia |

The men's sanshou 75 kilograms competition at the 2010 Asian Games in Guangzhou, China was held from 13 November to 17 November at the Nansha Gymnasium.

A total of nine competitors from nine different countries (NOCs) competed in this event, limited to fighters whose body weight was less than 75 kilograms.

Hamid Reza Gholipour from Iran won the gold medal after beating Ijaz Ahmed of Pakistan in gold medal bout 2–0. The bronze medal was shared by Jiang Chunpeng from China and Magsarjavyn Batjargal of Mongolia. Jiang's defeat to Gholipour in semifinal was the only defeat of Chinese wushu athletes in sanda competitions at the 2010 Asian Games, and their first defeat since 2002 Asian Games, Gholipour won that semifinal bout 2–1 in three rounds.

Athletes from Afghanistan, Malaysia, Nepal and Turkmenistan shared the fifth place.

== Schedule ==
All times are China Standard Time (UTC+08:00)

| Date | Time | Event |
|---|---|---|
| Saturday, 13 November 2010 | 19:30 | Round of 16 |
| Monday, 15 November 2010 | 19:30 | Quarterfinals |
| Tuesday, 16 November 2010 | 19:30 | Semifinals |
| Wednesday, 17 November 2010 | 19:30 | Final |

== Results ==
Legend

- AV — Absolute victory

Round of 16
Hamid Reza Gholipour (IRI) | 2
Ravinder Kumar (IND) | 0

Quarterfinals
Lee Sew Ket (MAS) | 0
Hamid Reza Gholipour (IRI) | 2
Jiang Chunpeng (CHN) | AV
Khairullah Takhari (AFG)
Magsarjavyn Batjargal (MGL) | 2
Bhushan Bajracharya (NEP) | 0
Ijaz Ahmed (PAK) | 2
Serdar Mämmedow (TKM) | 1

Semifinals
Hamid Reza Gholipour (IRI) | 2
Jiang Chunpeng (CHN) | 1
Magsarjavyn Batjargal (MGL) | 0
Ijaz Ahmed (PAK) | 2

Final
Hamid Reza Gholipour (IRI) | 2
Ijaz Ahmed (PAK) | 0
