= Yeliz Fındık =

Turkish taekwondo practitioner

- Born: 1976 (age 49–50)
- Nationality: Turkish
- Style: Taekwondo, Boxing, Muay Thai, Kickboxing and Sanshou
- Trainer: Atilla Fındık

Other information
- Spouse: Atilla Fındık
- Notable club: Atilla Sport Club

Yeliz Fındık
Medal record

Representing Turkey

Women's Muay Thai

European Championships
Bronze medal – third place	2009 Liepāja	63.5 kg
Gold medal – first place	2008 Zgorzelec	67 kg

Women's Wushu - Sanshou

European Championships
Gold medal – first place	2010 Antalya	65 kg

Yeliz Fındık (born in 1976) is a Turkish female martial artist competing in the Taekwondo, boxing, Muay Thai, Kickboxing and wushu disciplines.

== Early life ==
As she was 9 years old, She became acquainted with martial arts in the fitness center, where her elder sister used to practise Taekwondo for weight loss. However, she had to discontinue her training twelve years long due to serious burning injuries on her face she sustained from an accident with electric shock at the age of 13.

Following a number of plastic surgeries, she returned to active sport and gained success in competitions. Her marriage with a trainer for martial arts helped her to extend the styles she is practicing onto five different disciplines.

== Achievements ==
Kickboxing

- Gold (+65 kg) 2006 National Kickboxing Championships - August 26-September 1, 2006, Malatya, Turkey
- Bronze (70 kg) 2006 W.A.K.O. European Championships (Full-Contact) - October 24–30, 2006, Lisbon, Portugal
- Gold (70 kg) 2008 National Kickboxing Championships - July 2–5, 2008, Mersin, Turkey

Muay Thai

- Gold (67 kg) 2008 European Amateur Muay Thai Championships - June 22–28, 2008, Zgorzelec, Poland
- Gold (63.5 kg) 2009 National Muay Thai Championships - April 15–19, 2009, Antalya, Turkey
- Bronze (63.5 kg) 2009 European Amateur Muay Thai Championships - May 15–19, 2009, Liepāja, Latvia

Taekwondo

- Bronze (67 kg) 2009 Turkey Western Group Adults Taekwondo Championships - January 15–18, 2009, Alanya, Turkey

Wushu

- Gold (65 kg) 2008 National Wushu Championships - July 17–20, 2008, Ordu, Turkey
- Gold (65 kg ) 13th European Wushu Championships - March 6–13, 2010, Antalya, Turkey
