= Hüseyin Dündar =

Turkish boxer

- Born: 1986 (age 39–40); Adana, Turkey
- Nationality: Turkish
- Style: boxing, kickboxing, Muay Thai, Wushu

Other information
- Occupation: Primary education teacher
- University: Çukurova University, Adana
- Notable club: Fenerbahçe Boxing

Hüseyin Dündar
Medal record

Representing Turkey

Boxing

World University Championships
Bronze medal – third place	2006 Almaty	54 kg

Kickboxing

World Championships
Gold medal – first place	2005 Moscow	54 kg
Gold medal – first place	2011 Dublin	57 kg

Wushu - Sanshou

World Championships
Bronze medal – third place	2009 Toronto	52 kg
Gold medal – first place	2007 Beijing	52 kg
Bronze medal – third place	2003 Macau	52 kg

World Games
Silver medal – second place	2013 Cali	Sanda 56 kg

World Cup
Gold medal – first place	2008 Harbin	52 kg

European Championships
Gold medal – first place	2010 Antalya	52 kg
Gold medal – first place	2008 Warsaw	52 kg
Gold medal – first place	2006 Lignanoa	52 kg
Gold medal – first place	2004 Póvoa de Varzim	52 kg

Hüseyin Dündar (born 1986 in Adana, Turkey) is a Turkish martial artist competing in the boxing, kickboxing, Muay Thai and wushu disciplines. He is Turkey's first world gold medalist in Sanshou. He is a member of Fenerbahçe SK.

Hüseyin Dündar studied Physical Training and Sports at the Çukurova University in Adana. Currently, he is a teacher at a primary education school in Adana.

== Achievements ==
Boxing

- Bronze (54 kg) 2006 World University Boxing Championship - October 2–9, 2006 Almaty, Kazakhstan
- Silver (54 kg) 22nd International Ahmet Cömert Tournament - May 9–13, 2007 Istanbul, Turkey

Kickboxing

- Gold (54 kg-Full contact) World IAKSA Championships - September 2005, Moscow, Russia
- Gold (54 kg) National Championships - September 26-October 1, 2006 Malatya, Turkey
- Gold (57 kg) National K-1/Low kick Championships - July 2–6, 2008 Mersin, Turkey
- Gold (57 kg) National K-1/Low kick Championships - April 19–24, 2010 Antalya, Turkey
- Gold (57 kg) National Championships (Full Contact) - May 2–7, 2011 Urfa, Turkey
- Gold (57 kg) WAKO World Championships (Full Contact) -November 20–27, 2011 Dublin, Ireland
- Gold (57 kg) National Championships (Full Contact) - March 5–10, 2012 Kirsehir, Turkey

Muay Thai

- Gold (54 kg) National Championships - March 13–18, 2007, Hatay, Turkey
- Gold (57 kg) National Championships - April 15–19, 2009, Antalya, Turkey

Wushu

- Gold (52 kg) 9th European Championships - October 25–27, 2002, Póvoa de Varzim, Portugal
- Bronze (52 kg) 7th World Championships - November 3–7, 2003, Macau, China
- Gold (52 kg) 10th European Championships - 2004, Moscow, Russia
- Gold (52 kg) 11th European Championships - November 6–12, 2006, Lignano, Italy
- Gold (52 kg) 9th World Championships - November 11–17, 2007, Beijing, China
- Gold (52 kg) 4th World Cup - September 19–21, 2008, Harbin, China
- Gold (52 kg) 12th European Championships - October 16–19, 2008, Warsaw, Poland
- Bronze (52 kg) 9th World Championships - October 25–29, 2009, Toronto, Canada
- Gold (52 kg) 13th European Championships - March 6–13, 2010, Antalya, Turkey
