= Öznur =

Öznur is a Turkish female given name. Notable people with the name include:

- Öznur Cüre (born 1997), Turkish Paralympic archer
- Öznur Kızıl (born 1991), Turkish wushu practitioner
- Öznur Polat (born 1987), Turkish curler and curling coach
- Öznur Serçeler (born 1987), Turkish actress
