= Gülşah =

Gülşah is a feminine name and it may refer to:

- Gülşah Hatun (died in 1487), a concubine of Mehmed II of the Ottoman Empire
- Gülşah Akkaya (born 1977), Turkish basketballer
- Gülşah Düzgün (born 1995), Turkish Paralympian goalball player
- Gülşah Gümüşay (born 1989), Turkish basketballer
- Gülşah Günenç (born 1985), Turkish swimmer
- Gülşah Kıyak (born 1989), Turkish wushu practitioner
- Gülşah Kocatürk (born 1986), Turkish female judoka
