= 2006 World University Boxing Championship =

Boxing competitions

The 2006 World University Boxing Championships took place in Almaty, Kazakhstan between October 2 and 9 2006. 82 boxers from 14 countries participated at the second edition tournament.

== Participating nations ==
- Azerbaijan
- Germany
- Japan
- Kazakhstan
- Kyrgyzstan
- Lithuania
- Maldives
- Russia
- Serbia
- Tajikistan
- Turkey
- Turkmenistan
- Ukraine
- Uzbekistan

== Results ==
Bronze medals are awarded to both losing finalists.

2006 World University Boxing Championship
Weight	Gold	Silver	Bronze	
48 kg	(Kazakhstan) Nurlan Abdraimov	(Ukraine) Aleksander Gritshuk	(Mongolia) Jigjid Otgonbayar	
51 kg	(Kazakhstan) Andrei Spiridonov	(Tajikistan) Anvar Yunusov	(Mongolia) Pürevdorjiin Serdamba	
54 kg	(Mongolia) Enkhbatyn Badar-Uugan	(Kazakhstan) Yerzhan Omirzhanov	(Tajikistan) Bakhodur Karimov	(Turkey) Hüseyin Dündar
57 kg	(Uzbekistan) Abdugaffar Umarov	(Russia) Araik Ambartsumov	(Kazakhstan) Madi Shulakov	(Turkey) Çetin Özdemir
60 kg	(Russia) Ivan Lopatin	(Kazakhstan) Askarbek Kalpakov	(Turkey) Mustafa Doğan	(Mongolia) Uranchimegiin Mönkh-Erdene
64 kg	(Uzbekistan) Darkhan Ashirov	(Russia) Dmitry Mikhailenko	(Mongolia) Byambyn Tüvshinbat	(Uzbekistan) Zakir Artykov
69 kg	(Kazakhstan) Bakhyt Sarsekbayev	(Russia) Maksim Koptyakov	(Mongolia) Chuluntumur Tomorkhuyagl	(Serbia) Aleksander Drenovak
75 kg	(Kazakhstan) Dauren Yeleusinov	(Russia) Aleksi Tsherbakov	(Moldova) Igor Konobeyev	(Turkey) Savaş Kaya
81 kg	(Kazakhstan) Yerdos Dzhanabergenov	(Turkey) Bahram Muzaffer	(Azerbaijan) Zaur Teimurov	(Tajikistan) Jakhon Banov
91 kg	(Lithuania) Vitaliyus Subachus	(Moldova) Mikhail Muntyan	(Turkey) Erhan Şentürk	(Kazakhstan) Yevgnei Yegemberdiev
+91 kg	(Russia) Magomed Abdussalamov	(Turkey) Deniz Fidan	(Moldova) Denis Ursu	(Kazakhstan) Kanat Altayev

== Medal count table ==
2006 World University Boxing Championship
Pos	Country	Gold	Silver	Bronze	Total
1	Kazakhstan	5	2	3	10
2	Russia	2	4		6
3	Uzbekistan	2		1	3
4	Mongolia	1		5	6
5	Lithuania	1			1
6	Turkey		2	5	7
7	Maldives		1	2	3
7=	Tajikistan		1	2	3
9	Ukraine		1		1
10	Azerbaijan			1	1
10=	Serbia			1	1
	Total	11	11	20	42

== See also ==
- 2006 World University Championships
- World University Championships
