= College softball =

Softball played on the intercollegiate level

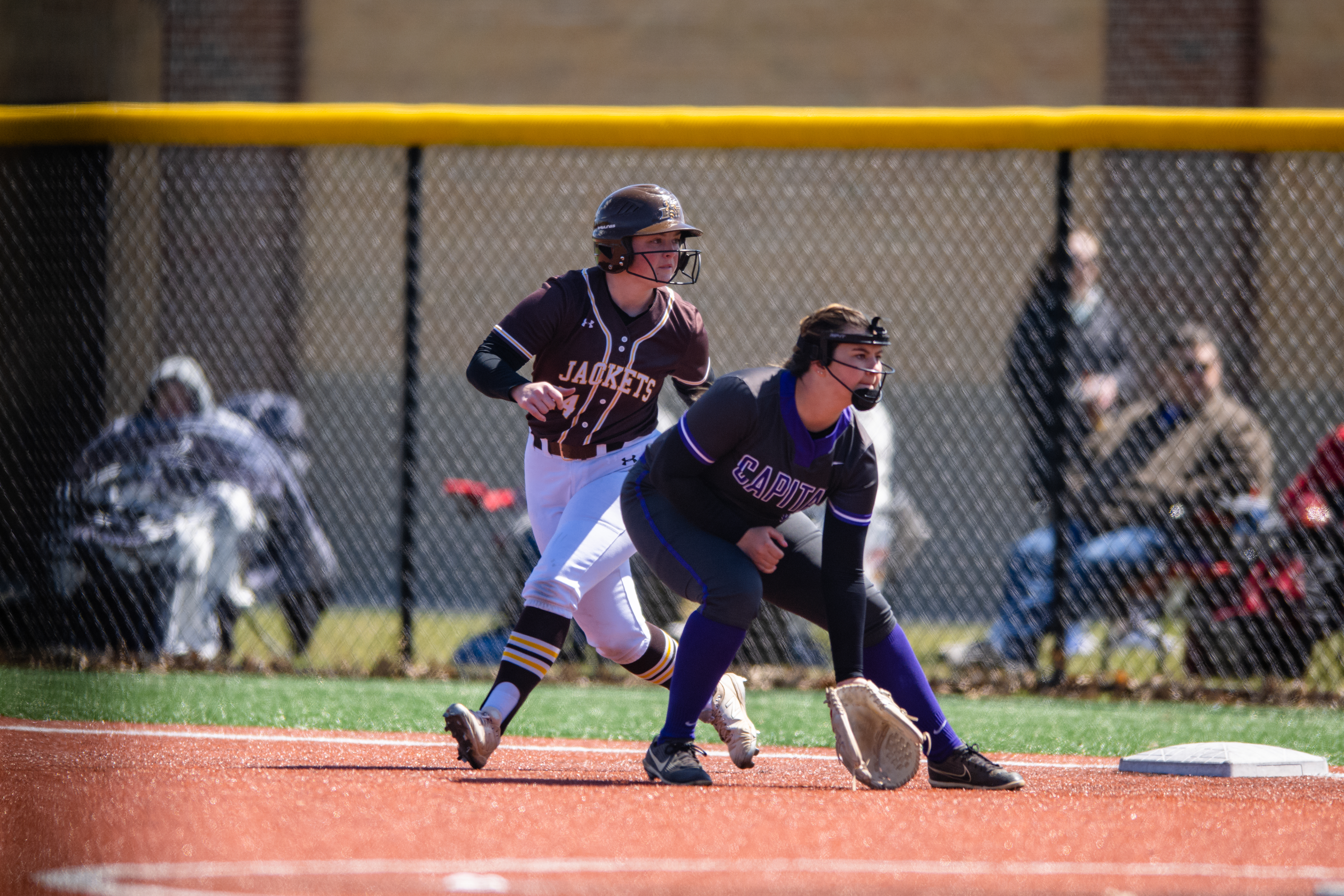
- An NCAA Division III softball game in 2022
- Governing body: List: NCAA; NAIA; NCCAA; NJCAA; USCAA; CCCAA; ACCA
- First played: 1930s

Club competitions
- NCAA Div III; NAIA Championship

College softball is softball as played on the intercollegiate level at institutions of higher education, predominantly in the United States. College softball is normally played by women at the intercollegiate level, whereas college baseball is normally played by men.

As with other intercollegiate sports, most college softball in the United States is played under the auspices of the National Collegiate Athletic Association (NCAA) or the National Association of Intercollegiate Athletics (NAIA). Over 600 NCAA member colleges are sponsors of women's softball programs. The women's softball championships are held in Division I, Division II, and Division III. The NCAA publishes the rules of play, while each sanctioning body supervises season-ending tournaments.

The final rounds of the NCAA tournaments are known as the Women's College World Series (WCWS); one is held on each of the three levels of competition sanctioned by the NCAA. The Division I Women's College World Series is held annually in June at USA Softball Hall of Fame Stadium in Oklahoma City near the site of the National Softball Hall of Fame.

== History ==
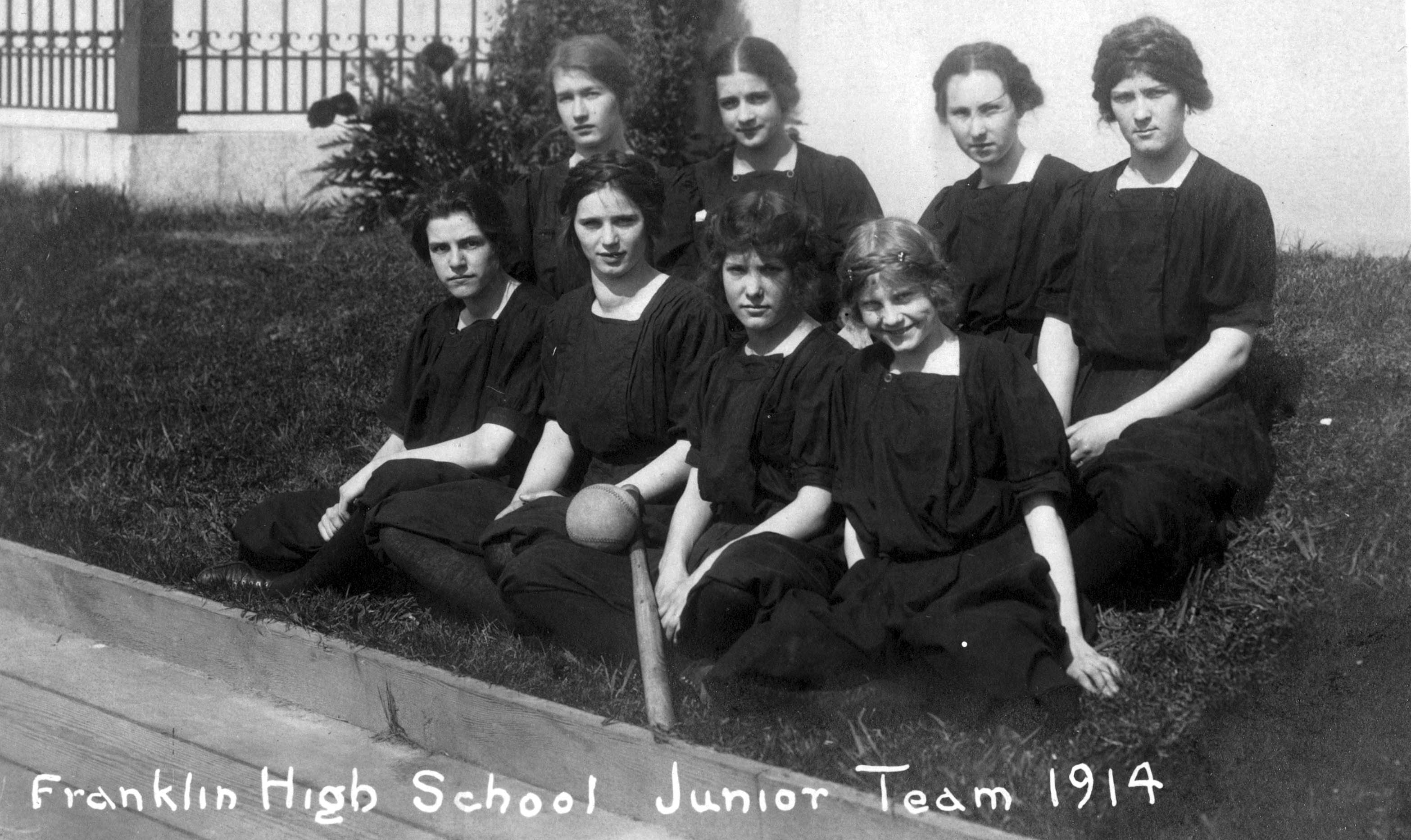
Franklin High School junior team of Seattle, in 1914

Many early intercollegiate women's softball games were part of play days or informal tournaments. The Midwest, particularly Wisconsin, played a pivotal role in the early development of women's intercollegiate softball during the 1930s. The first WCWS was held in 1969 in Omaha, Nebraska, sponsored by the Amateur Softball Association and the Division for Girls' and Women's Sports. The first under NCAA auspices was held in 1982.

In 2004 the International Softball Federation (ISF) held the first World University Softball Championship just two months after the 2004 Olympic competition. It was an eight country championship, with Team USA defeating Chinese Taipei for the gold medal. In 2006 the Fédération Internationale du Sport Universitaire (FISU) held the second World University Softball Championship in Taiwan, and in 2007 softball was added to the World University Games of FISU.

== Viewership and popularity ==
In 2026, the Women's College World Series averaged around 1.6 million viewers per game, which was a 20% increase from 2025. The second championship game between Texas and Texas Tech also ended up being the most-watched college softball game on record, with around 2.5 million viewers.

== Junior college softball ==
The National Junior College Athletic Association was founded on May 14, 1938.

== See also ==
- Association for Intercollegiate Athletics for Women – US women's college sports association
- Association for Intercollegiate Athletics for Women championships – US women's college sports association
- College sports – Collegiate and university-level competitive sports
- National Softball Hall of Fame and Museum
- List of NCAA Division I softball programs
- NCAA Division I softball tournament – Annual softball tournament
- Softball at the 1996 Summer Olympics
- Softball at the 2000 Summer Olympics
- Softball at the 2004 Summer Olympics
- Softball Australia
- University and college rivalry#United States – Ongoing competitiveness between two institutions
- USA Softball – US governing body for softball
- World University Softball Championship – Women's softball tournament
