= Öznur Kızıl =

Turkish wushu practitioner

- Born: 1991 (age 34–35)
- Nationality: Turkish
- Weight: 47.75 kg (105.3 lb)
- Division: Sanshou 48 kg
- Style: Wushu
- Trainer: Niyazi Akca

Other information
- University: Kocaeli Academy of Sports and Physical Education
- Notable clubs: Akca Sport Club, Sultanbeyli, Istanbul

Öznur Kızıl
Medal record

Representing Turkey

Women's Wushu - Sanshou

World Championships
Bronze medal – third place	2009 Toronto	48 kg

World Cup
Bronze medal – third place	2010 Chongqing	48 kg

World Junior Championships
Bronze medal – third place	2006 Kuala Lumpur	48 kg

European Championships
Gold medal – first place	2010 Antalya	48 kg

Öznur Kızıl (born in 1991) is a Turkish female wushu practitioner competing in the Sanshou 48 kg division.

Since 2004, she is a member of the Akca Sport Club in Sultanbeyli, Istanbul, where she is coached by Niyazi Akca. She is a student at the Kocaeli Academy of Sports and Physical Education.

== Achievements ==
- Bronze (48 kg) 1st World Junior Wushu Championships – 19–26 August 2006, Kuala Lumpur, Malaysia
- Bronze (48 kg) 10th World Wushu Championships – 25–29 October 2009, Toronto, Canada
- Gold (48 kg) 13th European Wushu Championships – 6–13 March 2010, Antalya, Turkey
- Bronze (48 kg) 5th Sanda World Cup – 16–18 December 2010, Chongqing, China
