= 2008 Beijing Wushu Tournament – Women's daoshu and gunshu =

Women's daoshu and gunshu at the 2008 Beijing Wushu Tournament
- Venue: Olympic Sports Center Gymnasium
- Dates: 23 August
- Competitors: 7 from 7 nations

Medalists
gold medal	Geng Xiaoling	Hong Kong
silver medal	Jade Xu	Italy
bronze medal	Chai Fong Wei	Malaysia

The women's daoshu / gunshu all-around competition at the 2008 Beijing Wushu Tournament was held on August 21 at the Olympic Sports Center Gymnasium.

== Background ==
The favorite of the competition was Jade Xu (then known as Xu Huihui). At the 2007 World Wushu Championships, Xu became a three-time world champion. Geng Xiaoling was another projected favorite, as she won a silver medal in daoshu and a bronze medal in changquan at the 2007 world championships which was also her international debut. Another projected favorite could have been Macau's Xi Cheng Qing who won the gunshu and changquan silver medals at the 2007 world championships, but she decided to compete in the changquan event for this competition and won silver.

Although Xu was ranked first in the gunshu event, Geng was able to achieve a superior performance for daoshu and won the competition.

== Schedule ==
All times are Beijing Time (UTC+08:00)

Date	Time	Event
Saturday, 23 August, 2008	09:30	Gunshu
Saturday, 23 August, 2008	20:29	Daoshu

== Results ==
Both events were judged without the degree of difficulty component.

Rank	Athlete	Gunshu	Daoshu	Total
1st place, gold medalist(s)	Geng Xiaoling (HKG)	9.66	9.70	19.36
2nd place, silver medalist(s)	Jade Xu (ITA)	9.69	9.62	19.31
3rd place, bronze medalist(s)	Chai Fong Wei (MAS)	9.60	9.56	19.16
4	Lee Wei Jen (CAN)	9.43	9.50	18.93
5	Yuliana Kurniawan (INA)	9.43	9.49	18.92
6	Julia Chernitsova (RUS)	9.49	9.38	18.87
7	Natalya Gerevitz (ISR)	9.44	9.21	18.65
