= Barhoumi =

Barhoumi is a surname common in north Africa. Notable people with the surname include:

- Issam Barhoumi (born 1978), Tunisian martial artist
- Jasmina Barhoumi (born 2002), German-born Tunisian footballer
- Sufyian Barhoumi (born 1973), Algerian Guantanamo detainee
- Tasnime Barhoumi (born 2007), French-born Tunisian footballer goalkeeper
