= Gholipour =

Gholipour (Persian: قلی پور, lit. "son of Gholi") is an Iranian surname which can also be found in the Iranian diaspora. Notable people with the surname include:

- Hamid Reza Gholipour (born 1988), Iranian wushu athlete
- Rasoul Molla-Gholipour (1955–2007), Iranian film director, screenwriter and cinematographer
