= Jade Xu =

Chinese-American actress and wushu taolu athlete

Personal information
- Native name: 徐慧慧
- Born: Xu Huihui; February 9, 1986 (age 40) Shanghai, China
- Home town: Las Vegas, Nevada, United States
- Occupation(s): Martial artist, athlete, actress, coach
- Spouse: David Torok

Sport
- Sport: Wushu Taolu
- Event(s): Changquan, Daoshu, Gunshu
- Team: Italy Wushu Team (2003-2009)
- Coached by: Xu Guan Guan
Medal record
Representing Italy
Women's Wushu Taolu
Olympic Games (unofficial)
Silver medal – second place	2008 Beijing	Daoshu+Gunshu
World Championships
Gold medal – first place	2005 Hanoi	Daoshu
Gold medal – first place	2007 Beijing	Daoshu
Gold medal – first place	2009 Toronto	Gunshu
Silver medal – second place	2003 Macau	Daoshu
Silver medal – second place	2005 Hanoi	Changquan
Silver medal – second place	2009 Toronto	Daoshu
Bronze medal – third place	2005 Hanoi	Gunshu

Jade Xu Hui-hui (Chinese: 徐慧慧; pinyin: Xú Huìhuì; born February 9, 1986) is a Chinese-born martial artist, actress, stunt performer, and former wushu taolu competitor, who has resided and competed in Italy and the United States. She is a three-time world champion and is one of the most renowned athletes to represent a European country at the World Wushu Championships.

In her acting career, she is best known for portraying Helen Takahama / Widow in the Marvel Cinematic Universe films Black Widow and Shang-Chi and the Legend of the Ten Rings (both 2021).

== Early life ==
On February 9, 1986, Xu was born in Shanghai, China. Xu's mother was Xu Guan-guan who also served as her coach. Xu moved with her family to Italy at the age of nine.

== Career ==
=== Competitive Wushu ===
At the age of six, Xu started practicing wushu. Representing Italy, Xu's international debut was at the 2003 World Wushu Championships in Macau, where she won a silver medal in daoshu. Two years later, she was a triple medalist in the 2005 World Wushu Championships in Hanoi, Vietnam, becoming the world champion in daoshu. She was the world champion in the same event two years later at the 2007 World Wushu Championships in Beijing, China. This qualified her for the women's daoshu and gunshu combined event in the 2008 Beijing Wushu Tournament where she won the silver medal. Her last major international competition was at the 2009 World Wushu Championships in Toronto, Canada, where she was the world champion in gunshu and also won a silver medal in daoshu.

=== Acting ===
After retiring from competitive wushu, Xu transitioned to acting. She first starred as Sister Mahjong in Tai Chi 0 and Tai Chi Hero, and in the title role in the Chinese TV series The Legend of Wing Chun. In 2012, Xu was recruited to perform in Cirque du Soleil's Michael Jackson: One show, in which she plays one of the four central characters. In 2021, she played a Black Widow named Helen in Marvel Studios' Black Widow and reprised her role in Shang-Chi and the Legend of the Ten Rings, credited simply as "Widow".

== Personal life ==
Xu is married to David Torok, a fellow wushu competitor. They both reside in Las Vegas, Nevada.

== Filmography ==
=== Film ===
- Tai Chi 0 (2012) - Sister Mahjong
- Tai Chi Hero (2012) - Sister Mahjong
- Black Widow (2021) - Helen Takahama / Widow (also stunt performer)
- Shang-Chi and the Legend of the Ten Rings (2021) - Helen Takahama / Widow (also stunt performer)
- The Marvels (2023) - Stunt performer
- Captain America: Brave New World (2025) - Stunt performer

=== Video game ===
- Mortal Kombat 1 (2023) - Motion capture performer
