= Gülşah Kıyak =

Turkish wushu practitiomer

- Born: 1989 (age 36–37); Ankara, Turkey
- Nationality: Turkish
- Weight: 60 kg (130 lb)
- Division: Sanshou 60 kg
- Style: Wushu
- Trainer: İrfan Doruk

Other information
- University: Uludağ University, Bursa
- Notable clubs: Altınayak Sport Club, Esenler, Istanbul

Gülşah Kıyak
Medal record

Representing Turkey

Women's Wushu - Sanshou

World Championships
Bronze medal – third place	2009 Toronto	60 kg

World Cup
Bronze medal – third place	2010 Chongqing	60 kg

European Championships
Bronze medal – third place	2010 Antalya	60 kg
Gold medal – first place	2008 Warsaw	60 kg

European Junior Championships
Silver medal – second place	2007 Warsaw	60 kg

Gülşah Kıyak (born in 1989) is a Turkish female wushu practitioner competing in the Sanshou 60 kg division. She is a member of the Altınayak Youth and Sports Club in Esenler, Istanbul, where she is coached by İrfan Doruk. Since 2008, she is a student of Sports and Physical Education at the Uludağ University in Bursa.

== Early years ==
Gülşah Kıyak was born 1989 in Ankara as the youngest child of the family. Her parents moved in 1999 to Istanbul. Her father Hikmet Kıyak enrolled her upon an advice from a friend of him at martial arts training. So, she began practicing wushu in 2000 at the age of eleven in a small sport center in Esenler, Istanbul. Five years later in 2005, she won her first official champion title in the Istanbul tournament.

== Achievements ==
Kich boxing

- Gold (63 kg) 2005 National Youth Kick boxing Championships, Çorum, Turkey

Wushu

- Gold 2007 National Junior Wushu Championships - July 13–15, 2007, Gümüşhane, Turkey
- Silver 3rd European Junior Wushu Championships - October 4–7, 2007, Warsaw, Poland
- Gold (60 kg) 12th European Wushu Championships - March 6–13, 2008, Warsaw, Poland
- Gold (60 kg) 2009 National Wushu Championships - July 24–26, 2009, Safranbolu, Turkey
- Bronze (60 kg) 10th World Wushu Championships - October 25–29, 2009, Toronto, Canada
- Bronze (60 kg) 13th European Wushu Championships - March 6–13, 2010, Antalya, Turkey
- Bronze (60 kg) 5th Sanda World Cup - December 16–18, 2010, Chongqing, China

== Awards ==
- 2008 Best female wushu practitioner (Awarded by EWuF at the 12th EWuC)
