= Issam Barhoumi =

Tunisian heavyweight Sanshou kickboxer

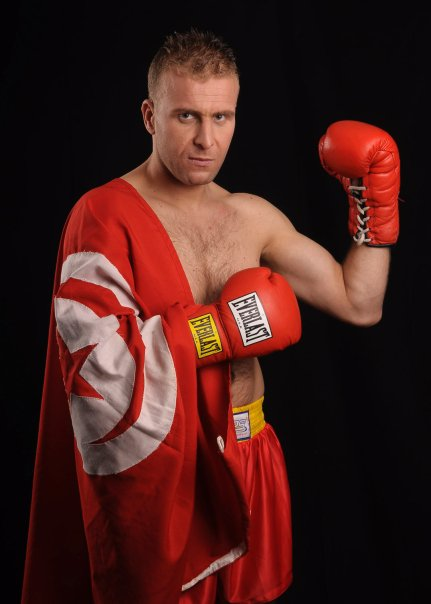
- Born: Issam Barhoumi; October 1, 1978 (age 48); Jilma, Tunisia
- Other names: Samurai Carthage
- Nationality: Tunisian
- Height: 1.81 m (5 ft 11 in)
- Weight: 84 kg (185 lb)
- Division: Welterweight
- Style: Sanshou, Savate, Yoseikan Budo, Full Contact, K-1, Kick Boxing, Ju-jitsu,
- Team: Samurai Club
- Rank: 15 time world champion 214 fights ,192 wins ,50 KO 7th degrés black belt in kick boxing.  //                     6th dan Black belt in kung-fu sanda. // 6th dan Black belt in traditional ju-jitsu. // 4th dan Black belt in Yoseikan Budo. // 4th dan Black belt in chinese wrestling shuai jiao. // 3rd degree silver glove in savate. // 1th dan Black belt in taekwondo.
- Years active: 31 years

Issam Barhoumi (Arabic: عصام البرهومي; born October 1, 1978, in Sidi Bouzid) is a Tunisian heavyweight Sanshou kickboxer.

== Biography ==
At the 10th International Wushu Federation Congress following the 2009 World Wushu Championships in Toronto, he served on the athletes' committee.

Issam won three world championships in the town of Marina Di Carrara, Italy from November 1 to 4, 2012: MMA world champion, K-1 world champion, light kickboxing world champion and champion of the world of Kung-fu, exploits still not publicized.

Issam won two world championships in Bussero, Italy on April 3, 2016, in K-1 and light contact disciplines. With these two medals, Issam Barhoumi currently holds world championship records 12 times in 7 disciplines. He stated afterwards that he was proud to have represented Tunisia as it should be, and to have honored the national flag.

== Mixed martial arts record ==
Professional record breakdown
1 match	0 wins	1 loss
By knockout	0	1

Res.	Record	Opponent	Method	Event	Date	Round	Time	Location	Notes
Loss	0–1	Samir Medjahdi	(TKO)	Hard Fighting Championship	September 22, 2018	1	2:31	Basel, Switzerland	

== Record ==
Wushu Sanda		Savate Boxe Française		Yoseikan Budo		Full Contact		K-1		Kick Boxing		MMA Amateur		Boxe Arabe	
^{world Championships}		^{professional world Championships}		^{world Championships}		^{World Championship light contact}		^{professional world Championships}		^{world Championships (Professional)}		^{world Championships}		^{professional world Championships}	
Bronze	2007 Beijing 75 kg	Gold	2019 Tunisie 80 kg	Gold	2007 Bruxelles 85 kg	Gold	2016 Milan-bussero (WFC) 78 kg	Gold	2018 Roma(ICO) 81 kg	Gold	2015 Milan-Bussero (WFC) 80 kg	Gold	2012 Massa-Carrara (WTKA) 84 kg	Gold	2019 Yemen 83 kg
Silver	2009 Toronto 75 kg	Gold	2019 Tunisie 80 kg	Gold	2007 Bruxelles 85 kg	Gold	2016 Milan-bussero (WFC) 78 kg	Gold	2018 Roma(ICO) 81 kg	Gold	2015 Milan-Bussero (WFC) 80 kg				
Gold	2012 Massa-Carrara (WTKA) 80 kg	Gold	2019 Tunisie 80 kg	Gold	2007 Bruxelles 85 kg	Gold	2016 Milan-bussero (WFC) 78 kg	Gold	2018 Roma(ICO) 81 kg	Gold	2015 Milan-Bussero (WFC) 80 kg				
^{World Cup}		^{world Championships Assaut}		^{Africa Championship}		^{World Championship Semifinal (professional)}		^{Amateur world Championships}		^{World Championship Light}					
Gold	2008 Harbin 75 kg	Bronze	2006 VilleBon-Paris 80 kg	Gold	2006 Dakar 80 kg	Gold	2004 Tunisia 75 kg	Gold	2012 Massa-Carrara (WTKA) 81 kg	Gold	2012 Massa-Carrara(WTKA) 79 kg				
Gold	2008 Harbin 75 kg	Silver	2010 Paris 85 kg	Gold	2006 Dakar 80 kg	Gold	2004 Tunisia 75 kg	Gold	2012 Massa-Carrara (WTKA) 81 kg	Gold	2012 Massa-Carrara(WTKA) 79 kg				
^{professional sanda kombat league world cup}		^{Savate kombat league world cup}		^{Africa Championship Team}		^{Professional Gala}		^{World Championship Light}		^{World Championship Light}					
Gold	2010 Rimini(KL)75 kg	Gold	2010 Rimini(KL)75 kg	Gold	2006 Dakar 80 kg	Gold	2003 Tunisia 79 kg	Gold	2016 Milan-Bussero (WFC) 84 kg	silver	2016 Milan-Bussero (WFC) 84 kg				
Gold	2010 Rimini(KL)75 kg	Gold	2010 Rimini(KL)75 kg	Gold	2006 Dakar 80 kg	Gold	2006 Nantes 76 kg	Gold	2016 Milan-Bussero (WFC) 84 kg	silver	2016 Milan-Bussero (WFC) 84 kg				
^{King of Sanda}		^{Mediterranean Tournament}		^{Maghreb Championship}											
Bronze	2008 Chongqing 75 kg	Gold	2004 Toulouse 76 kg	Bronze	1997 Tunisia 70 kg										
^{Afro-Asian Championship}		^{Gala Savate}		^{Maghreb Championship Team}											
Gold	2002 Egypt	Gold	2005 Annecy 75 kg	Bronze	1997 Tunisia 70 kg										
^{Championship Africa}		^{world Championships Combat}													
Gold	2007 Egypt 80 kg	Silver	2005 Bobigny-Paris 75 kg												
Gold	2008 Libya 75 kg	Silver	2007 Marseille 80 kg												
^{Arab Championship}		Silver	2007 Marseille 80 kg												
Gold	2005 Jordan 75 kg	Bronze	2011 Milan-Italy 75 kg												
Gold	2007 Egypt 80 kg														
^{Maghreb Championship}
Silver	2008 Tunis 75 kg														

== Cinema ==
=== films ===
- 2005 : L'esclave du passé pour un projet fin d'etude
- 2007 : cours métrage Fibali by Semi Jlassi
- 2010 : cours metrage Il était une fois à l'aube by Mohamed Ali Nahdi.
- 2023 : long metrage sabe9 el Khir by kais chekir

== Television ==
=== Series ===
- 2017 : Bolice by Majdi Smiri
- 2018 : 7 Sbeya by Kalfallah Khalsi
- 2018 : Denya okhra by Mamdouh Ben Abdelghaffar
- 2018 : Harba by Kais Chekir

=== Emissions ===
- 2015 : Emissions Social 15/25
