= Daria Tarasova =

Russian wushu practitioner

Personal information
- Native name: Дарья Тарасова
- Born: 6 July 1988 (age 37) Moscow, Russian SFSR, Soviet Union
- Occupation(s): Coach, martial artist, athlete

Sport
- Sport: Wushu
- Event(s): Changquan, Daoshu, Gunshu
- Team: Russian Wushu Team (2003-2015)
- Coached by: Tatiana Kupriyanova
Medal record
Representing Russia
Women's Wushu Taolu
Olympic Games (unofficial)
Gold medal – first place	2008 Beijing	Changquan
World Games
Gold medal – first place	2009 Kaohsiung	Changquan
World Combat Games
Gold medal – first place	2013 St. Petersburg	All-around (CQ)
World Championships
Gold medal – first place	2003 Macau	Gunshu
Gold medal – first place	2007 Beijing	Changquan
Silver medal – second place	2003 Macau	Changquan
Silver medal – second place	2009 Toronto	Changquan
Silver medal – second place	2011 Ankara	Gunshu
Silver medal – second place	2015 Kuala Lumpur	Gunshu
Bronze medal – third place	2007 Beijing	Gunshu
Bronze medal – third place	2009 Toronto	Daoshu
Bronze medal – third place	2011 Ankara	Daoshu
Bronze medal – third place	2015 Kuala Lumpur	Shuangjian

Daria Tarasova (born 6 July 1988) is a former competitive wushu taolu athlete and coach from Russia.

== Career ==
Tarasaova made her international debut at the 2003 World Wushu Championships where she became the world champion in women's gunshu.

Tarasova's gold medal in the women's changquan event at the 2007 World Wushu Championships qualified her for the 2008 Beijing Wushu Tournament, where she also won in the same event. Shortly after, Tarasova was awarded the "Golden Belt" award by the Russian Martial Arts Federation. A year later, she won gold once again in the women's changquan event at the 2009 World Games where wushu was an invitational sport. She also won a bronze and silver medal at the 2009 World Wushu Championships. Tarasova also competed in the 2010 World Combat Games. The following year, she won another silver and bronze medal at the 2011 World Wushu Championships.

In 2012, Tarasova was appointed as the ambassador of wushu from the International Wushu Federation to the International Olympic Committee. Ahead of the 2013 World Combat Games, Tarasova was again appointed as the ambassador of wushu and promoted the sport throughout St. Petersburg. At the competition, Tarasova won the female changquan, jianshu, and qiangshu combined event despite never specializing in both weapons. A year later, she was invited to demonstrate at the Nanjing Sports Lab, a promotional event for non-Olympic sports, which took place alongside the 2014 Summer Youth Olympics. Her last competition was at the 2015 World Wushu Championships where she won a silver medal in gunshu and a bronze medal in shuangjian. She ended her career while also having been a nineteen-time champion at the European Wushu Championships.

In 2013, Tarasova became a member of the IWUF's athlete committee and in 2021, was elected to be the committee's chairman and an executive board member of the IWUF. Today, she is a coach of the Russian Wushu Team.

Tarasova holds the rank of "4th duan" by the Chinese Wushu Association.
