= FISU World University Championships =

International college-athletics contests

International University Sports Federation Fédération Internationale du Sport Universitaire
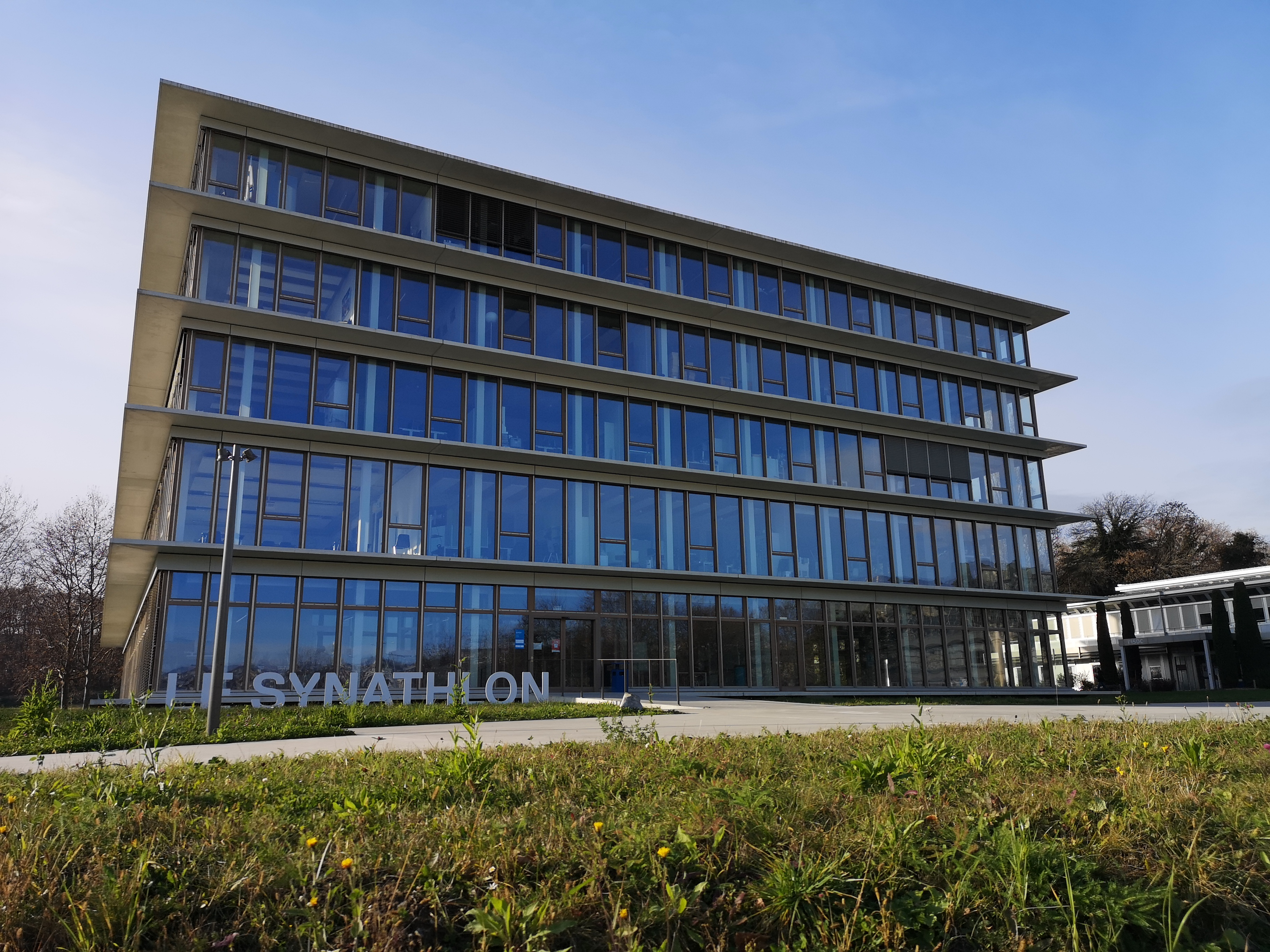
- Headquarters in Lausanne.
- Formation: 1 January 1949; 77 years ago
- Type: Sports federation
- Headquarters: 1949–2011: Brussels, Belgium; since 2011: Lausanne, Switzerland
- Members: 170 member associations
- Official language: French and English
- Acting President: Leonz Eder (Switzerland)
- Vice-Presidents: Luciano Cabral (Brazil) (1st VP), Penninah ALIGAWESA KABENGE (Uganda); Marian Dymalski (Poland); Zhen SHEN (China)
- Website: www.fisu.net/en/

The FISU World University Championships are part of the sporting events of the International University Sports Federation. The were first held in 1963 with Lund, Sweden hosting the handball championships.

== Championships ==
In the years that the FISU World University Games are held, the Championships are the same event as the World Games tournament (which was called Universiade from 1959 to 2020). The programme of the World University Championships is subject to change and currently includes 37 sports. In order to be as complete as possible, it includes:

- individual and team sports;
- indoor and outdoor sports;
- combat sports;
- mind sports;
- summer and winter sports.

Number	Event	First Edition	Last Edition
Main Sports
1	World University Archery Championships	1996	11th (2016)
2	World University Canoe Sprint Championships	1998	8th (2018)
3	†World University Canoe Slalom Championships	1994	6th (2008)
4	World University Cross Country Championships	1978	21st (2018)
5	World University Cycling Championships	1978	8th (2018)
6	World University Rowing Championships	1984	14th (2016)
7	World University Sailing Championships	2002	8th (2016)
8	World University Shooting Championships	2004	8th (2018)
Combat Sports
9	World University Boxing Championships	2004	8th (2018)
10	†World University Judo Championships	1966	18th (2006)
11	World University Karate Championships	1998	11th (2018)
12	World University Muaythai Championships	2018	1st (2018)
13	World University Sambo Championships	2016	2nd (2018)
14	†World University Savate Championships	2010	1st (2010)
15	†World University Taekwondo Championships	1986	13th (2014)
16	World University Wrestling Championships	1968	13th (2018)
17	World University Wushu Championships	2018	1st (2018)
Team Sports
18	World University 3x3 Basketball Championships	2012	3rd (2016)
19	World University American Football Championships	2014	3rd (2018)
20	World University Baseball Championships	2002	6th (2018)
21	World University Beach Volleyball Championships	2002	9th (2018)
22	World University Floorball Championships	2002	8th (2018)
23	World University Futsal Championships	1984	16th (2018)
24	World University Handball Championships	1963	25th (2022)
25	World University Korfball Championships	2018	1st (2018)
26	World University Netball Championships	2012	3rd (2018)
27	†World University Softball Championships	2004	2nd (2006)
28	World University Rugby Sevens Championships	2004	8th (2018)
Winter Sports
29	World University Ski Orienteering Championships	2016	2nd (2018)
30	World University Speed Skating Championships	2012	7th (2024)
Other Sports
31	†World University Badminton Championships	1990	15th (2018)
32	World University Bridge Championships	2002	9th (2018)
33	World University Cheerleading Championships	2018	1st (2018)
34	World University Chess Championships	1990	15th (2018)
35	World University Equestrian Championships	1998	11th (2016)
36	World University Golf Championships	1986	17th (2018)
37	World University Modern Pentathlon Championships	2018	1st (2018)
38	World University Orienteering Championships	1978	21st (2018)
39	World University Roller Sports Championships	2018	1st (2018)
40	World University Sport Climbing Championships	2016	2nd (2018)
41	World University Squash Championships	1996	10th (2018)
42	†World University Table Tennis Championships	1971	16th (2006)
43	World University Triathlon Championships	1992	14th (2018)
44	World University Waterski Championships	2004	4th (2016)
45	World University Weightlifting Championships	2008	6th (2018)
46	World University Woodball Championships	2004	5th (2016)

†=defunct

== Judo ==
Previous Events

1966	1st WUC Judo	Prague (TCH)
1967	5th Summer Universiade	Tokyo (JPN)
1968	2nd WUC Judo	Lisboa (POR)
1972	3rd WUC Judo	London (GBR)
1974	4th WUC Judo	Brussels (BEL)
1978	5th WUC Judo	Rio de Janeiro (BRA)
1980	6th WUC Judo	Wroclaw (POL)
1982	7th WUC Judo	Jyvaskyla (FIN)
1984	8th WUC Judo	Strasbourg (FRA)
1985	13th Summer Universiade	Kobe (JPN)
1987	9th WUC Judo	São Paulo (BRA)
1988	10th WUC Judo	Tbilissi (URS)
1990	11th WUC Judo	Brussels (BEL)
1994	12th WUC Judo	Münster (GER)
1995	18th Summer Universiade	Fukuoka (JPN)
1996	13th WUC Judo	Jonquière (CAN)
1998	14th WUC Judo	Prague (CZE)
1999	20th Summer Universiade	Palma de Mallorca (ESP)
2000	15th WUC Judo	Malaga (ESP)
2001	21st Summer Universiade	Beijing (CHN)
2002	16th WUC Judo	Novi Sad (SCG)
2003	22nd Summer Universiade	Daegu (KOR)
2004	17th WUC Judo	Moscow (RUS)
2005	23rd Summer Universiade	Izmir (TUR)
2006	18th WUC Judo	Suwon (KOR)
2007	24th Summer Universiade	Bangkok (THA)
2009	25th Summer Universiade	Belgrade (SRB)

== 2022 ==
1. FISU World University Championship Ski Orienteering Place: Jachymov, CZECH REPUBLIC 22–26 February 2022
2. FISU World University Championship Speed Skating Place: Lake Placid, UNITED STATES OF AMERICA 2–5 March 2022
3. FISU World University Championship Cross Country Place: Aveiro, PORTUGAL 12 March 2022
4. FISU University World Cup Finswimming Place: Lignano Sabbiadoro, ITALY 1–2 April 2022
5. FISU World University Championship Sport Climbing Place: Innsbruck, AUSTRIA 14–17 June 2022
6. FISU University World Cup Floorball Place: Liberec, CZECH REPUBLIC 20–24 June 2022
7. FISU University World Cup Handball Place: Pristina, KOSOVO 11–17 July 2022
8. FISU World University Championship Futsal Place: Braga-Guimarães, PORTUGAL 18–24 July 2022
9. FISU World University Championship Golf Place: Torino, ITALY 20–23 July 2022
10. FISU World University Championship Orienteering Place: Magglingen – Biel/Bienne, SWITZERLAND 17–21 August 2022
11. FISU World University Championship Beach Volleyball Place: Lake Placid, UNITED STATES OF AMERICA 24–28 August 2022
12. FISU World University Championship Triathlon Place: Maceió, BRAZIL 10–11 September 2022
13. FISU World University Championship Mind Sports Place: Antwerp, BELGIUM 12–17 September 2022
14. FISU World University Championship Canoe Sprint Place: Bydgoszcz, POLAND 16–18 September 2022
15. FISU World University Championship Modern Pentathlon Place: Buenos Aires, ARGENTINA 21–25 September 2022
16. FISU University World Cup Combat Sports 29 September -8 October 2022 Place : Moved from Russia to TBD
17. FISU University World Cup 3x3 Basketball Place: Xiamen, CHINA (PEOPLE'S REPUBLIC OF) 20–23 October 2022
18. FISU University World Cup Cheerleading Place: Heraklion (Creta), GREECE 4–6 November 2022
19. FISU World University Championship Squash Place: New Giza, EGYPT 7–13 November 2022 5–9 December 2022

=== Others ===
1. 2022 FISU Volunteer Leaders Academy (Online) 17 June 2022
2. International Day of University Sport (IDUS) 2022 IDUS 2022 20 September 2022
3. FISU World Forum 2022 Place: Cartago, COSTA RICA

=== Cancelled ===
1. FISU University World Cup American Football Place: Monterrey, MEXICO Cancelled
2. FISU University World Cup Powerlifting Place: 25–29 July 2022 CANCELLED
3. FISU World University Championship Waterski & Wakeboard Place: 24–27 August 2022 CANCELLED

== 2023 ==
1. FISU Word University Championship Rowing Place: London Ontario, CANADA 13–15 July 2023

== 2024 ==
1. Beach Volleyball: Maceió (BRA)
2. Canoeing: Montemor-o-Velho (POR)
3. Cross Country: Muscat (OMA)
4. Cycling: Cartago (CRC)
5. Futsal: San Juan (ARG)
6. Golf: Seinäjoki (FIN)
7. Mind Sports: Kampala (UGA)
8. Orienteering: Bansko (BUL)
9. Rowing: Rotterdam (NED)
10. Weightlifting: TBC
11. Waterski and Wakeboard: TBC
12. Triathlon: Gdansk (POL)
13. Squash: Cape Town (RSA)
14. Sport Climbing: Koper (SLO)
15. Shooting Sport: New Delhi (IND)

== World Cup ==
1. FISU University (with Qualifying Tournaments) from 2015
2. FISU University 3x3 Basketball World Cup (with Qualifying Tournaments) from 2019
3. FISU University Rugby Sevens World Cup (with Qualifying Tournaments) from 2022
4. FISU University Handball World Cup from 2022
5. FISU University Floorball World Cup from 2022
6. FISU University American Football World Cup from 2022
7. FISU University Combat Sports World Cup from 2022 (six sports: Boxing, Karate, Muaythai, Sambo, Wrestling, Wushu)
8. FISU University Finswimming World Cup from 2022
9. FISU University Cheerleading World Cup from 2022
10. FISU University Powerlifting World Cup from 2021

== See also ==
- Gymnasiade
- World School Championships
- World Military Championships
- European Universities Championships
- University and college sport
