= Wushu at the 2014 Asian Games – Women's changquan =

Women's changquan at the 2014 Asian Games
- Venue: Ganghwa Dolmens Gymnasium
- Dates: 23 September 2014
- Competitors: 13 from 12 nations

Medalists
gold medal	Kan Wencong	China
silver medal	Geng Xiaoling	Hong Kong
bronze medal	Tan Yan Ni	Singapore

The women's changquan competition at the 2014 Asian Games in Incheon, South Korea was held on 23 September at the Ganghwa Dolmens Gymnasium.

== Schedule ==
All times are Korea Standard Time (UTC+09:00)

Date	Time	Event
Tuesday, 23 September 2014	09:00	Final

== Results ==
Rank	Athlete	Score
1st place, gold medalist(s)	Kan Wencong (CHN)	9.75
2nd place, silver medalist(s)	Geng Xiaoling (HKG)	9.66
3rd place, bronze medalist(s)	Tan Yan Ni (SIN)	9.63
4	Hoàng Thị Phương Giang (VIE)	9.62
5	Yu Chih-hsuan (TPE)	9.51
6	Sandi Oo (MYA)	9.45
7	Y. Sapana Devi (IND)	9.27
8	Sou Cho Man (MAC)	9.27
9	Hanieh Rajabi (IRI)	9.27
10	Myat That Su Wai Phyo (MYA)	8.97
11	Sushmita Tamang (NEP)	8.06
12	Patricia Nseir (LIB)	7.34
13	Payai Her (LAO)	6.94
