= Ijaz Ahmed (wushu) =

Pakistani wushu competitor (born 1981)

Medal record

Men's Wushu

Representing Pakistan

Asian Games
Silver medal – second place	2010 Guangzhou	Sanshou (75kg)

Ijaz Ahmed (b: 26 April 1981) is an international wushu competitor from Pakistan. He won a silver medal at the 2010 Asian Games in Guangzhou, China.He won a gold medal at 2006 South Asian Games in Colombo, Sri Lanka. He is the only silver medalist from Pakistan in any martial arts at the Asian Games.

== Career ==
=== 2010 ===
Ahmed participated in Sanshou (75 kg) category at the 2010 Asian Games in China in November. In the quarter-finals he defeated Turkmenistan's Serdar Mamedov by 2 to 1 before defeating Mongolia's Batjargal Magsarjav 2-0 to reach the final where he was defeated by Iran's Hamidreza Gholipour 2-0.
