= Lee Jong-chan (wushu) =

Korean wushu athlete

Personal information
- Born: December 10, 1984 (age 41)

Sport
- Sport: Wushu
- Event(s): Changquan, Daoshu, Gunshu
- Team: Korean Wushu Team
Medal record
Representing South Korea
Men's Wushu Taolu
World Championships
Gold medal – first place	2009 Toronto	Changquan
Silver medal – second place	2011 Ankara	Daoshu
Bronze medal – third place	2009 Toronto	Gunshu
Asian Games
Silver medal – second place	2010 Guangzhou	Daoshu+Gunshu

Lee Jong-chan (Korean: 이종찬; RR: ijongchan; born December 10, 1984) is a former wushu taolu athlete from South Korea. He is a one-time world champion and a silver medalist at the 2010 Asian Games. He also competed in the 2008 Beijing Wushu Tournament and finished sixth in men's daoshu and gunshu.

== See also ==
- List of Asian Games medalists in wushu
