= 2008 Beijing Wushu Tournament – Women's changquan =

Women's changquan at the 2008 Beijing Wushu Tournament
- Venue: Olympic Sports Center Gymnasium
- Dates: 21 August
- Competitors: 7 from 7 nations

Medalists
gold medal	Daria Tarasova	Russia
silver medal	Xi Cheng Qing	Macau
bronze medal	Susyana Tjhan	Indonesia

The women's changquan competition at the 2008 Beijing Wushu Tournament was held on August 21 at the Olympic Sports Center Gymnasium.

== Schedule ==
All times are Beijing Time (UTC+08:00)

Date	Time	Event
Thursday, 21 August, 2008	20:58	Changquan

== Results ==
The event was judged with the degree of difficulty component.

Rank	Athlete	Score
1st place, gold medalist(s)	Daria Tarasova (RUS)	9.74
2nd place, silver medalist(s)	Xi Cheng Qing (MAC)	9.65
3rd place, bronze medalist(s)	Susyana Tjhan (INA)	9.58
4	Khor Poh Chin (SIN)	9.37
5	Selene Tsang Lok Teng (CAN)	9.03
6	Vũ Trà My (VIE)	8.97
7	Sandi Oo (MYA)	7.92
