= Geng Xiaoling =

Hong Kong wushu practitioner

Geng Xiaoling MH
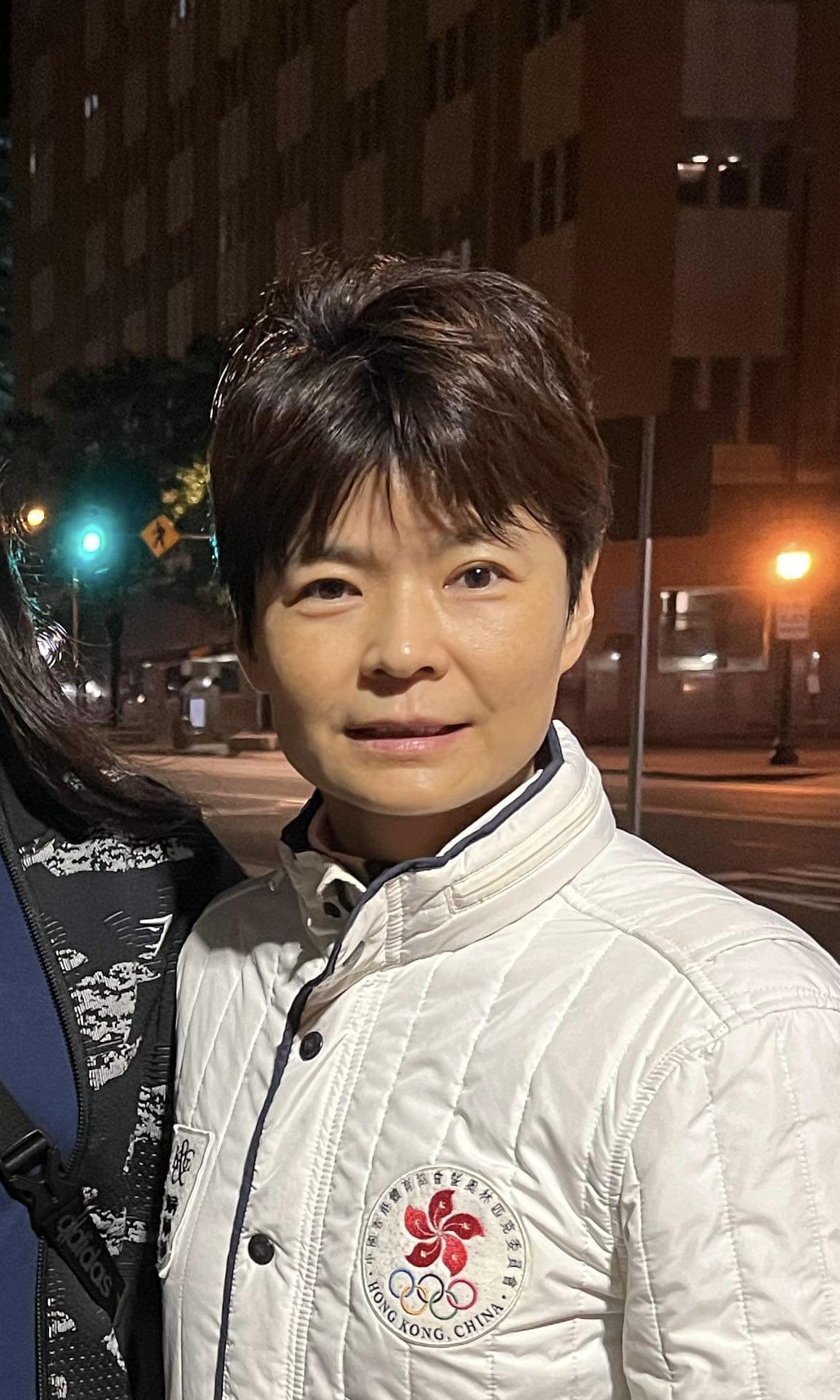
- Geng Xiaoling in Fort Worth in 2023

Personal information
- Nickname: 大師姐 "Master sister"
- Born: 2 February 1984 (age 42) Heze, Shandong, China
- Education: Law Ting Pong Secondary School; Education University of Hong Kong
- Occupation(s): Martial artist, athlete, coach
- Height: 1.53 m (5 ft 0 in)
- Weight: 46 kg (101 lb)

Sport
- Sport: Wushu
- Event(s): Changquan, Daoshu, Gunshu
- Team: Hong Kong Wushu Team
- Coached by: Yu Liguang
- Retired: 2015, 2018
Medal record
Representing Hong Kong
Women's Wushu Taolu
Event	1st	2nd	3rd
World Championships	5	6	1
Asian Games	1	1	0
Asian Championships	3	1	1
East Asian Games	2	0	0
Other	1	1	0
Total	12	9	2
Olympic Games (unofficial)
Gold medal – first place	2008 Beijing	Daoshu+Gunshu
World Combat Games
Silver medal – second place	2010 Beijing	Changquan
World Championships
Gold medal – first place	2009 Toronto	Daoshu
Gold medal – first place	2011 Ankara	Gunshu
Gold medal – first place	2013 Kuala Lumpur	Daoshu
Gold medal – first place	2015 Jakarta	Changquan
Gold medal – first place	2015 Jakarta	Gunshu
Silver medal – second place	2007 Beijing	Daoshu
Silver medal – second place	2009 Toronto	Gunshu
Silver medal – second place	2011 Ankara	Changquan
Silver medal – second place	2011 Ankara	Daoshu
Silver medal – second place	2013 Kuala Lumpur	Changquan
Silver medal – second place	2013 Kuala Lumpur	Gunshu
Bronze medal – third place	2007 Beijing	Changquan
Asian Games
Gold medal – first place	2010 Guangzhou	Changquan
Silver medal – second place	2014 Incheon	Changquan
Asian Championships
Gold medal – first place	2008 Macau	Gunshu
Gold medal – first place	2012 Ho Chi Minh City	Daoshu
Gold medal – first place	2012 Ho Chi Minh City	Gunshu
Silver medal – second place	2008 Macau	Daoshu
Bronze medal – third place	2012 Ho Chi Minh City	Changquan
East Asian Games
Gold medal – first place	2009 Hong Kong	Daoshu+Gunshu
Gold medal – first place	2013 Tianjin	Daoshu+Gunshu

Geng Xiaoling MH (simplified Chinese: 耿晓灵; traditional Chinese: 耿曉靈; pinyin: Gěngxiǎolíng; born 2 February 1984) is a retired professional wushu taolu athlete who represented Hong Kong. She is one of the most renowned taolu athletes of all time, having been a five-time world champion and a gold medallist at the Asian Games and the East Asian Games. She is a current coach for the Hong Kong Wushu Team.

== Career ==
Geng began training wushu at the age of ten and later was accepted into the Shandong Wushu Team. She competed at the 2005 National Games of China but was unsuccessful in winning any medals. In 2006, she was approached by Yu Liguang, coach of the Hong Kong wushu team, and was invited to start representing Hong Kong in wushu competitions.

Geng's international debut was at the 2007 World Wushu Championships in Beijing where she won a silver medal in daoshu and a bronze medal in changquan. This qualified her for the 2008 Beijing Wushu Tournament where she won the gold medal in the daoshu and gunshu combined event. A year later, she appeared at the 2009 East Asian Games and won in the same combined event. During the 2009 World Wushu Championships, she won her first gold medal (in daoshu) at the WWC, and also won a silver medal in gunshu. Geng's next major appearance was at the 2010 World Combat Games where she won a silver medal in changquan. A few months later, she was able to win the gold medal in the changquan event at the 2010 Asian Games. A year later, she was a triple medallist at the 2011 World Wushu Championships and was the world champion in gunshu. At the 2013 World Wushu Championships, she was a triple medallist once again and was the world champion in daoshu for the second time.

Half a month before the 2013 East Asian Games, Geng suffered a knee injury and was told that she should not compete. She persisted, and was able to win the gold medal in the daoshu and gunshu combined event. A year later at the 2014 Asian Games, her four teammates forfeited from competition due to injuries and Geng felt pressured to win Hong Kong's only medal in the wushu event and to also defend her title from 2010. She managed to win the silver medal in changquan, making up for this loss with an impressive showing at the 2015 World Wushu Championships where she won two gold medals, becoming world champion in changquan and gunshu. After this competition, Geng announced her formal retirement from competition and became an assistant coach for the Hong Kong wushu team.

Shortly before the 2018 Asian Games, three wushu athletes who were to represent Hong Kong were deemed ineligible to compete because they did not fulfil the residency requirement to represent Hong Kong at an international sporting competition. At the age of 34, Geng was called out of retirement to compete in the women's changquan event. Although she performed successfully, Geng lost a podium spot due to a 0.1 deduction. Despite not placing, she stated she was satisfied with her performance, and declared her retirement once again to resume coaching the Hong Kong Wushu Team.

== Competitive History ==
Year	Event	CQ	DS	GS	AA
2005	National Games of China	?	?	?	?
2007	World Championships	3rd place, bronze medalist(s)	2nd place, silver medalist(s)	4	
2008	Asian Championships	3rd place, bronze medalist(s)	2nd place, silver medalist(s)	1st place, gold medalist(s)	
2008	Olympic Games (unofficial)		2	1	1st place, gold medalist(s)
2009	East Asian Games		?	?	1st place, gold medalist(s)
2009	World Championships	9	1st place, gold medalist(s)	2nd place, silver medalist(s)	
2010	World Combat Games	2nd place, silver medalist(s)			
2010	Asian Games	1st place, gold medalist(s)			
2011	World Championships	2nd place, silver medalist(s)	2nd place, silver medalist(s)	1st place, gold medalist(s)	
2012	Asian Championships	3rd place, bronze medalist(s)	1st place, gold medalist(s)	1st place, gold medalist(s)	
2013	World Championships	2nd place, silver medalist(s)	1st place, gold medalist(s)	2nd place, silver medalist(s)	
2013	East Asian Games		?	?	1st place, gold medalist(s)
2014	Asian Games	2nd place, silver medalist(s)			
2015	World Championships	1st place, gold medalist(s)	5	1st place, gold medalist(s)	
2016	Retired				
2017	Retired				
2018	Asian Games	5			

== Honours ==
Awards from the Hong Kong SAR Government

- Medal of Honour: 2011

Hong Kong Sports Stars Awards

- Outstanding Athlete of Hong Kong: 2010, 2011, 2012, 2013, 2015

Awards from the Junior Chamber International Hong Kong

- Ten Outstanding Young Persons of Hong Kong: 2017

== See also ==
- List of Asian Games medalists in wushu
