= 2010 European Wushu Championships =

13th edition of the European Wushu Championships

- Venue: Dilek Sabancı Sport Hall (capacity: 3,500)
- Location: Antalya, Turkey
- Start date: March 6, 2010
- End date: March 13, 2010
- Competitors: 394 from 28 nations

The 2010 European Wushu Championships was the 13th edition of the European Wushu Championships. It was held at Dilek Sabancı Sport Hall in Antalya, Turkey between March 6–13, 2010. A total of 394 athletes from 28 countries participated at the championships.

== Medal table ==
=== Overall ===
* Host nation (Turkey)

Rank	Nation	Gold	Silver	Bronze	Total
1	Russia (RUS)	80	14	10	104
2	Turkey (TUR)*	15	29	22	66
3	Ukraine (UKR)	8	29	12	49
4	Italy (ITA)	7	6	4	17
5	Netherlands (NED)	5	0	4	9
6	Bulgaria (BUL)	3	2	2	7
7	Romania (ROM)	2	8	9	19
8	Great Britain (GBR)	2	1	2	5
9	Armenia (ARM)	2	0	10	12
10	Israel (ISR)	1	4	5	10
11	Spain (ESP)	1	1	5	7
12	Czech Republic (CZE)	1	0	0	1
13	Belarus (BLR)	0	5	8	13
14	France (FRA)	0	4	2	6
14	Poland (POL)	0	4	2	6
16	Sweden (SWE)	0	2	2	4
17	Germany (GER)	0	1	2	3
18	Lebanon (LBN)	0	1	0	1
19	Portugal (POR)	0	0	3	3
19	Switzerland (SUI)	0	0	3	3
21	Belgium (BEL)	0	0	2	2
21	Greece (GRE)	0	0	2	2
23	Azerbaijan (AZE)	0	0	1	1
23	Hungary (HUN)	0	0	1	1
Totals (24 entries)		127	111	113	351

== Medal summary (Adults) ==
=== Taolu ===
==== Men ====
Event	Gold	Silver	Bronze
Changquan	Vladimir Maksimov; Russia	Vladyslav Lyutenko; Ukraine	Steve Coleman; Great Britain; Emrullah Gül; Turkey
Daoshu	Vladimir Maksimov; Russia	Andrii Koval; Ukraine	Idan Shraer; Israel
Gunshu	Vladimir Maksimov; Russia	Andrii Koval; Ukraine	Idan Shraer; Israel
Jianshu	Igor Gulin; Russia	Oleksii Nosach; Ukraine	Adan Navarro; Spain
Qiangshu	Igor Gulin; Russia	Pierre Rouviere; France	Adan Navarro; Spain
Nanquan	Stanislav Galkin; Russia	Andrii Koval; Ukraine	Alexey Nazinkin; Russia
Nandao	Michele Giordano; Italy	Stanislav Galkin; Russia	Alexey Nazinkin; Russia
Nangun	Alexey Nazinkin; Russia	Michele Giordano; Italy	Stanislav Galkin; Russia
Taijiquan	Baoyao Fei; Netherlands	Sebastian Weber; Germany	Dion Willis; Great Britain
Taijijian	Baoyao Fei; Netherlands	Avedis Seropian; Lebanon	Sebastian Weber; Germany
Duilian barehand	Turkey; Murat Urhan; Hasan Hüseyin Yılmaz	none awarded	none awarded
Duilian weapons	Ukraine; Andrii Koval; Oleksii Nosach; Sergii Romaniuk	France; Pierre Rouviere; Leo Benouaich	Spain; Francois Favreau; Adan Navarro

==== Women ====
Event	Gold	Silver	Bronze
Changquan	Daria Tarasova; Russia	Julia Chernitsova; Russia	Natalya Gerevitz; Israel
Daoshu	Daria Tarasova; Russia	Alona Shkut; Ukraine	Lakkhana Bui; Switzerland
Gunshu	Daria Tarasova; Russia	Alona Shkut; Ukraine	Julia Chernitsova; Russia
Jianshu	Julia Chernitsova; Russia	Ganna Varlamova; Ukraine	Romina Quatela; Italy
Qiangshu	Fang Oei; Netherlands	Ganna Varlamova; Ukraine	Romina Quatela; Italy
Nanquan	Tatiana Ivshina; Russia	Maria Clarizia; Italy	Margarida Santos; Portugal
Nandao	Tatiana Ivshina; Russia	none awarded	none awarded
Nangun	Tatiana Ivshina; Russia	Maria Clarizia; Italy	Margarida Santos; Portugal
Taijiquan	Fang Oei; Netherlands	Arianna Romano; Italy	Barbara Drieskens; Belgium
Taijijian	Fang Oei; Netherlands	Arianna Romano; Italy	Barbara Drieskens; Belgium
Duilian bare hands	Italy; Antonia Di Biase; Maria Clarizia	Turkey; Zülbiye Sebahat Demir; Gülistan Koşulan Kaçay	none awarded
Duilian weapons	Ukraine; Alona Shkut; Ganna Varlamova	Russia; Daria Tarasova; Svetlana Zhurkina	none awarded

=== Sanshou ===
==== Men ====
Event	Gold	Silver	Bronze
52 kg	Hüseyin Dündar; Turkey	Abakar Magomedov; Russia	Rafik Harutyunyan; Armenia
52 kg	Hüseyin Dündar; Turkey	Abakar Magomedov; Russia	Nocolae Arlond Enache; Romania
56 kg	Rustam Kakraev; Russia	Ali Ay; Turkey	Karen Sahakyan; Armenia
56 kg	Rustam Kakraev; Russia	Ali Ay; Turkey	Mihai Alexandru Paiu; Romania
60 kg	Kazbek Mamaev; Russia	Nils Widlund; Sweden	İsmail İnce; Turkey
60 kg	Kazbek Mamaev; Russia	Nils Widlund; Sweden	Rafael Terverdiyev; Azerbaijan
65 kg	Magomed Idrisov; Russia	Oleksandr Lunachevskyi; Ukraine	Jeffrey Manupassa; Netherlands
65 kg	Magomed Idrisov; Russia	Oleksandr Lunachevskyi; Ukraine	Ramazan Çiçek; Turkey
70 kg	Ismail Aliev; Russia	Jean-Luc Hamon; France	Aliaksandr Kuzmenkou; Belarus
70 kg	Ismail Aliev; Russia	Jean-Luc Hamon; France	Gonçalo Pinto; Portugal
75 kg	Dzhankhuvat Beletov; Russia	Rostyslav Kytun; Ukraine	Andrei Dubanevich; Belarus
75 kg	Dzhankhuvat Beletov; Russia	Rostyslav Kytun; Ukraine	Francisco Sobradelo; Spain
80 kg	Arslan Bektemirov; Russia	Miguel Velaz; Spain	Andrei Kisialeu; Belarus
80 kg	Arslan Bektemirov; Russia	Miguel Velaz; Spain	Giovanni Cuccureddu; Italy
85 kg	Aliev Arsen; Russia	Leonid Ushkalov; Ukraine	Sandor Major; Hungary
85 kg	Aliev Arsen; Russia	Leonid Ushkalov; Ukraine	Bilal Atille; Turkey
90 kg	Alfonso Valcarcel; Spain	Taras Gorobets; Ukraine	Serop Atzemian; Greece
90 kg	Alfonso Valcarcel; Spain	Taras Gorobets; Ukraine	Ilyas Mansurov; Russia
+90 kg	Temerland Alakalovl; Russia	Yaşar Gülay; Turkey	Leendert Jan Mulder; Netherlands
+90 kg	Temerland Alakalovl; Russia	Yaşar Gülay; Turkey	Patrick Schmid; Switzerland

==== Women ====
Event	Gold	Silver	Bronze
48 kg	Öznur Kızıl; Turkey	Cristina Aurelia Toporaste; Romania	none awarded
52 kg	Eva Liskova; Czech Republic	Natalya Markova; Russia	Sarah Belala; France
56 kg	Ekaterina Mukhortikova; Russia	Lehize Hilal Benli; Turkey	Clara Victoria Patrugan; Romania
56 kg	Ekaterina Mukhortikova; Russia	Lehize Hilal Benli; Turkey	Maria Olsson; Sweden
60 kg	Ekaterina Balko; Russia	Stefania Baron; Italy	Priscilla Staubli; Switzerland
60 kg	Ekaterina Balko; Russia	Stefania Baron; Italy	Gülşah Kıyak; Turkey
65 kg	Yeliz Fındık; Turkey	Margarita Kalmykova; Russia	Eftychia Schismenou; Greece
65 kg	Yeliz Fındık; Turkey	Margarita Kalmykova; Russia	Valerie Domergue; France
75 kg	Valerie Domergue; Italy	Laura Frangu; Romania	none awarded
