= Xi Cheng Qing =

Macau wushu practitioner

Sport
- Sport: Wushu
- Event(s): Changquan, Daoshu, Gunshu
- Team: Macau Wushu Team
Medal record
Representing Macau
Women's Wushu Taolu
Olympic Games (unofficial)
| Silver medal – second place | 2008 Beijing | Changquan |
World Championships
| Silver medal – second place | 2007 Beijing | Changquan |
| Silver medal – second place | 2007 Beijing | Gunshu |
| Bronze medal – third place | 2009 Toronto | Gunshu |
East Asian Games
| Silver medal – second place | 2009 Hong Kong | Changquan |
| Silver medal – second place | 2009 Hong Kong | Daoshu+Gunshu |
Asian Championships
| Silver medal – second place | 2008 Macau | Daoshu |
| Bronze medal – third place | 2008 Macau | Gunshu |

Xi Cheng Qing (Chinese: 席成清; pinyin: Xíchéngqīng) is a retired wushu taolu athlete from Macau. She is a triple medalist at the World Wushu Championships, she won the silver medal in women's changquan at the 2008 Beijing Wushu Tournament, and she is a double medalist at the East Asian Games and the Asian Wushu Championships.
