= Tai Chi 0 =

2012 Hong Kong-Chinese film by Stephen Fung

Tai Chi 1: 0/ Tai Chi Zero
- Theatrical release poster
- Directed by: Stephen Fung
- Screenplay by: Cheng Hsiao-tse; Zhang Jialu
- Story by: Chen Kuo-fu
- Produced by: Chen Kuo-fu; Stephen Fung; Zhang Dajun; James Wang; Daniel Wu
- Starring: Tony Leung; Angelababy; Jayden Yuan
- Cinematography: Lai Yiu-fai
- Edited by: Cheng Hsiao-tse; Matthew Hui Wai-kit; Zhang Jialu; Zhang Weili; Xiao Yang
- Music by: Katsunori Ishida
- Production companies: Huayi Brothers; Diversion Films
- Distributed by: Huayi Brothers Media Corporation
- Release date: 27 September 2012
- Running time: 99 minutes
- Countries: Hong Kong; China
- Language: Mandarin

Tai Chi 1: 0 (太極之零開始) or Tai Chi Zero (太極：從零開始) is a 2012 3D martial arts film directed by Stephen Fung. A Hong Kong-Chinese co-production, the film is a fictitious account of how the Chen style of the martial art tai chi, that had for generations remained within the Chen family of Chenjiagou, was taught to the first outsider, Yang Luchan, by Chen Changxing. This is the first film to be produced by Stephen Fung's and Daniel Wu's new production company, Diversion Pictures and also marked the acting debut of wushu athlete Jayden Yuan, who plays the lead role. The film was shot back-to-back with its sequel, Tai Chi Hero. They are to be followed by a third as-of-yet undeveloped movie named Tai Chi Summit.

== Characters ==
=== Main characters ===
Yang Lu Chan aka the Freak played by Xiaochao Yuan aka Jayden Yuan

Lu Chan is the protagonist of Tai Chi Zero and its sequel. He is something of an idiot throughout the first and most of the second movie. Lu Chan was born into a wealthy family with a father who did not participate much with his upbringing. His mother, however, saw great potential in him swore to herself that she would do whatever it took to raise Lu Chan well, even if it means stealing from her wealthy husband.

Lu Chan was born with a serious ailment known as the "Three Blossoms on the Crown," which takes the form of a large growth on his head. Whenever this growth is dealt a large blow, Lu Chan's eyes turn completely white as he enters a berserk mode where he attacks everything completely based on instinct with unbelievable strength. This power was discovered at a fair during a fight with some rowdy kids by a supposed martial arts entertainer named Zhao. That same day his father found out that his wife had been stealing money from him to raise Lu Chan and ordered his servants to beat her to death. Instead, his mother, finding it unreasonable that he order servants to beat her, ran head-first into a post so hard that it left her on the verge of death. She was thrown out of the house as soon as Lu Chan returned with Zhao following close behind.

As she was breathing her last breaths, Zhao informed his wife of Lu Chan's potential. Right before she died, she told Lu Chan that he only had to do one thing well: kung fu. Many years later and Lu Chan is revealed to be a loyal and skilled soldier of the Divine Truth Cult, a rebel force against the Emperor. This is because it was revealed that the entertainer Zhao was actually a general of the Cult, looking for any potential recruits to his army in disguise. It is shown that Zhao continuously abused Lu Chan's special power to win battles, even though it has proven to be harmful to his health and will eventually lead to his death. The Cult's doctor informs Lu Chan of his impending death and that the only way to prevent it is to go to Chen Village and learn Chen-style kung fu from Grandmaster Chen Chang Xiang. That night their camp is ambushed by enemy soldiers which provides Lu Chan with the perfect incentive to go.

Lu Chan has a near-insatiable appetite which leads him to even eat leaves and flowers off of plants. In Tai Chi Hero, the Grandmaster reveals that this is because the "Three Blossoms on the Crown" drains a lot of his energy which causes him to act foolish and to be constantly hungry. He is shown to be extremely stubborn and persistent, as well as, durable when he is trying to enter the village to learn kung fu, despite being rejected because outsiders are forbidden from being taught. He is excellent at mimicking moves, only needing to see them once or twice before nearly perfecting them, which is how he eventually manages to enter the village.

Chen Yu Niang played by Angela Yeung Wing aka Angelababy

Chen Yu Niang is the daughter of Grandmaster Chen Chang Xiang and a master of Chen-style kung fu. At the beginning of Tai Chi Zero, she is engaged to Zi Jing until he breaks off the engagement after being disappointed that his railroad proposal was rejected by the village. She has three brothers, one of which does not make an appearance until the second movie. At first she is depressed by Zi Jing breaking off their engagement and enraged when she found out he was in love with Claire. By the first movie's end she marries Lu Chan, not out of love but to save him because he was about to be maimed for mimicking, and therefore stealing, Chen-style kung fu. At first, she claims that their marriage is a sham and rather than husband and wife, they are master and pupil, as she will be teaching him kung fu now that he shares the Chen name. Not too late into the second movie, however, she realizes that she is in love with Lu Chan.

Fang Zi Jing played by Eddie Peng

Fang Zi Jing is the main antagonist of Tai Chi Zero and its sequel Tai Chi Hero. He grew up in Chen Village but, since he was treated as an outsider, he was not allowed to learn Chen-style kung fu and therefore all of the children called him the "wimp." He traveled to England to study engineering in an effort to prove himself. At the beginning of Tai Chi Zero, he is Yu Niang's fiancé and in the middle of attempting to convince the elders of Chen Village to welcome the western ways and allow a railroad to run through the village. He fails to persuade them which leads him to become depressed at being unable to prove himself worthy and to break up with Yu Niang.

He leaves the village only to later return with a steam-powered railway laying machine known as "Troy" which was brought by a woman named Claire who works at the same western company as him. It is later revealed that he met Claire in America, where they had fallen in love with one another. When Claire is killed by the explosion caused by the destruction of "Troy," he was devastated and swore his revenge on Chen Village. He left once again and returned with an army in retaliation to the destruction of the machine. The army is pushed back by the villagers without any casualties and Zi Jing has the palms of his hands and the side of his face scarred.

Chen Chang Xing played by Tony Leung Ka Fai

Chen Chang Xing is the grandmaster of Chen-style kung fu and father of Chen Yu Niang.

=== Supporting characters ===
Claire Heathrow played by Mandy Lieu

A female employee of the English company that Zi Jing works for who was sent to Chen Village to supervise his progress. The real reason that she came, however, is because she is in love with Zi Jing, who she met when he was studying engineering in England and later in the first movie that he reciprocates the feelings. When she comes she brings along an enormous war machine called "Troy." When the machine was destroyed by Lu Chan and Yu Niang, the resulting explosion killed Claire, which led to Zi Jing swearing vengeance on Chen Village.

Lao Zhao played by Hark-On Fung, aka Feng Ko-An, Fung Hark-On, Feng Ke-An, Fung Yuen, Fung Ke-An, Fung Ku-On, Fung Kin, Funghak On, Fung Koi-An, Fuen Ke-An

He was first introduced as a martial arts entertainer at a fair that Lu Chan attended the day his mother died. He is later revealed to be a general of the Divine Truth Cult, a rebel army against the Emperor, who passed as an entertainer to recruit people who he saw potential in. When he saw Lu Chan unleashed he followed him home and told his dying mother that he saw Lu Chan's potential and swore to look over him. Many years later it is shown that he has made use of Lu Chan's "Three Blossoms on the Crown" in war many times. It is also shown that he does not actually care for Lu Chan's well-being because when he is informed that if Lu Chan continues fighting he will most definitely die. That night their group was ambushed by enemy soldiers.

Brother Tofu played by Shen Si

A Chen villager who sells Tofu and is skilled in martial arts. When Lu Chan was kicked out of the village because outsiders were not allowed to be taught Chen-style kung fu he would continue trying to break into the village by fighting villagers. Lu Chan lost every fight until he came against Brother Tofu and won by mimicking the Chen-style moves that had defeated him so far to knock the Tofu of his hand and win the contest.

Nan played by Stephen Fung

Mother Yang played by Shu Qi

Father Yang played by Wai Keung Lau aka Andrew Lau

Dong played by Bruce Leung Siu-Lung

Chen You Zhi played by Wu Di

Chen Geng Yun played by Chen Sicheng

Grand Uncle played by Stanley Fung aka Feng Tsui-Fan, Fung Tsui-Feng, Fung Tsui-Fan, Fung Tsiu-Fan, Fong Sue-Fan, Feng Shui-Fan, Fung Sui-Fann, Fong Chu-Fang, Fung Shiu-Fan, Fung Shu-Fan, Fung Shiu-kan, Feng Cui-Fan

Chen Geng Yun's Wife played by Xiong Nai Jin aka Little Fan Bingbing

Governor played by Ying Da

Uncle Qin played by Xiong Xin Xin

Zhao Di played by Ngai Oi-Hin aka Wei Ai Xuan

Sister Mahjong played by Jade Xu aka Xu Hui Hui

Brother Tofu played by Shen Si

Chen Zai Yang played by Feng Shao Feng

Jim Yuner played by Nikki Hsieh

== Reception ==
According to Rotten Tomatoes, a review aggregator, Tai Chi 0 has a 61% approval rating, based on 31 reviews with an average rating of 5.8/10. Reviews were positive; Margaret Pomeranz and David Stratton awarded the film 3.5 stars, with Pomeranz describing it as "visually exuberant."

=== Awards and nominations ===
Tai Chi Zero was an official selection for the Venice Film Festival 2012, the Toronto Film Festival 2012, and the Busan Film Festival 2012.

The film received the following nominations:

Hong Kong Film Awards 2012

- Best Action Choreography
- Best Costume Design
- Best Set Design
- Best Visual Effects
- Best Newcomer

Taiwan Golden Horse Awards 2012

- Best Action Choreography
- Best Costume Design
