= 2009 World Wushu Championships =

10th edition of the World Wushu Championships

- Venue: Ricoh Coliseum (capacity: 8,300)
- Location: Toronto, Ontario, Canada
- Start date: October 25, 2009
- End date: October 29, 2009
- Competitors: 600 from 72 nations

The 2009 World Wushu Championships was the 10th edition of the World Wushu Championships. It was held at the Ricoh Coliseum in Toronto, Ontario, Canada from October 25 to October 29, 2009.

== Medal table ==
* Host nation (Canada)

Rank	NOC	Gold	Silver	Bronze	Total
1	China	14	0	1	15
2	Iran	5	6	1	12
3	Hong Kong	3	6	3	12
4	Russia	3	4	3	10
5	Egypt	3	1	1	5
6	Macau	2	4	2	8
7	Malaysia	2	2	5	9
8	Japan	1	5	1	7
9	Indonesia	1	1	5	7
10	South Korea	1	1	4	6
11	Canada*	1	1	2	4
12	Italy	1	1	1	3
13	United States	1	1	0	2
14	France	1	0	4	5
15	Chinese Taipei	1	0	1	2
16	Tunisia	0	2	0	2
16	Venezuela	0	2	0	2
18	Great Britain	0	1	1	2
18	Ukraine	0	1	1	2
20	Spain	0	1	0	1
21	Turkey	0	0	7	7
22	Singapore	0	0	3	3
23	Brazil	0	0	2	2
23	Romania	0	0	2	2
25	Algeria	0	0	1	1
25	Azerbaijan	0	0	1	1
25	Germany	0	0	1	1
25	Kazakhstan	0	0	1	1
25	Lebanon	0	0	1	1
25	Netherlands	0	0	1	1
25	Peru	0	0	1	1
25	Switzerland	0	0	1	1
Totals (32 entries)		40	40	58	138

== Medalists ==
=== Men's taolu ===
Event	Gold	Silver	Bronze
Changquan	Lee Jong-chan; South Korea	Jia Rui; Macau	Daisuke Ichikizaki; Japan
Daoshu	Jia Rui; Macau	Masashi Harada; Japan	Ng Say Yoke; Malaysia
Gunshu	Lu Yongxu; China	Jia Rui; Macau	Lee Jong-chan; South Korea
Jianshu	Alfred Hsing; United States	Etsuro Shitaokoshi; Japan	Erwein Wijayanto; Indonesia
Qiangshu	Wu Di; China	Colvin Wang; United States	Charles Sutanto; Indonesia
Nanquan	Ho Mun Hua; Malaysia	He Jingde; Hong Kong	Timothy Hung; Canada
Nandao	Koki Nakata; Japan	Farshad Arabi; Iran	He Jingde; Hong Kong
Nangun	He Jingde; Hong Kong	Farshad Arabi; Iran	Kim Tae-ho; South Korea
Taijiquan	Lee Yang; Malaysia	Ryota Tamura; Japan	Jack Loh; Malaysia
Taijijian	Huang Yingqi; China	Jack Loh; Malaysia	Wee Key Seet; Singapore
Duilian	Iran; Mohsen Ahmadi; Ebrahim Fathi; Ehsan Peighambari	Ukraine; Andriy Koval; Oleksiy Nosach; Sergey Romaniuk	Hong Kong; Cheng Chung Hang; Tang Siu Kong; Leung Ka Wai

=== Women's taolu ===
Event	Gold	Silver	Bronze
Changquan	Ma Lan; China	Daria Tarasova; Russia	Zheng Tianhui; Hong Kong
Daoshu	Geng Xiaoling; Hong Kong	Jade Xu; Italy	Daria Tarasova; Russia
Gunshu	Jade Xu; Italy	Geng Xiaoling; Hong Kong	Xi Cheng Qing; Macau
Jianshu	Margherita Cina; Canada	Zheng Tianhui; Hong Kong	Susyana Tjhan; Indonesia
Qiangshu	Zheng Tianhui; Hong Kong	Keiko Yamaguchi; Japan	Khor Poh Chin; Singapore
Nanquan	Wu Yiyi; China	Yuen Ka Ying; Hong Kong	Tai Cheau Xuen; Malaysia
Nandao	Tatiana Ivshina; Russia	Yuen Ka Ying; Hong Kong	Tai Cheau Xuen; Malaysia
Nangun	Huang Yan Hui; Macau	Tatiana Ivshina; Russia	Diana Bong; Malaysia
Taijiquan	Lindswell Kwok; Indonesia	Ai Miyaoka; Japan	Wen Ching-ni; Chinese Taipei
Taijijian	Wen Ching-ni; Chinese Taipei	Ng Shin Yii; Malaysia	Lindswell Kwok; Indonesia
Duilian	China; Gao Jing; Liu Haiyun	Hong Kong; Zheng Tianhui; Yuen Ka Ying; Kwan Ning Wai	Singapore; Tao Yi Jun; Khor Poh Chin; Tay Yu Juan

=== Men's sanda ===
Event	Gold	Silver	Bronze
48 kg	Ahmed Hama; Egypt	Zulfahmi Fitra; Indonesia	Daniel Aliaga; Peru
48 kg	Ahmed Hama; Egypt	Zulfahmi Fitra; Indonesia	Wa Son Cheong; Macau
52 kg	Sun Wenliang; China	Seong Jin-jeon; South Korea	Gunawan; Indonesia
52 kg	Sun Wenliang; China	Seong Jin-jeon; South Korea	Hüseyin Dündar; Turkey
56 kg	Li Haiming; China	Sait Khayrulaev; Russia	Cha Jun-youl; South Korea
56 kg	Li Haiming; China	Sait Khayrulaev; Russia	Jerônimo Martins; Brazil
60 kg	Duan Hansong; China	Mohsen Mohammadseifi; Iran	Abdulmenaf Atalay; Turkey
60 kg	Duan Hansong; China	Mohsen Mohammadseifi; Iran	Baharaddin Salimov; Azerbaijan
65 kg	Ali Dehghan; Iran	Cai Jun Long; Macau	Savaş Bekar; Turkey
65 kg	Ali Dehghan; Iran	Cai Jun Long; Macau	Pierre Moua; France
70 kg	Ahmed Ibrahim; Egypt	Cai Liang Chan; Macau	Ismail Aliev; Russia
70 kg	Ahmed Ibrahim; Egypt	Cai Liang Chan; Macau	Sajjad Abbasi; Iran
75 kg	Dzhanhuat Beletov; Russia	Issam Barhoumi; Tunisia	Zack George; Canada
75 kg	Dzhanhuat Beletov; Russia	Issam Barhoumi; Tunisia	Yavuz Selim Kazanci; Turkey
80 kg	Hossein Ojaghi; Iran	Miguel Velaz; Spain	Zemmal Nacerdine; Algeria
80 kg	Hossein Ojaghi; Iran	Miguel Velaz; Spain	Amro Abdelkader; Egypt
85 kg	Muslim Salikhov; Russia	Hamid Reza Gholipour; Iran	Xu Jiaheng; China
85 kg	Muslim Salikhov; Russia	Hamid Reza Gholipour; Iran	Oliver Hasler; Switzerland
90 kg	Moussa Niangane; France	Jon Robson; Great Britain	Imarzhan Idillayev; Kazakhstan
90 kg	Moussa Niangane; France	Jon Robson; Great Britain	Taras Gorobets; Ukraine
+90 kg	Chen Yanzhao; China	Bozigit Ataev; Russia	Leendert-Jan Mulder; Netherlands
+90 kg	Chen Yanzhao; China	Bozigit Ataev; Russia	Jakob Lenz; Germany

=== Women's sanda ===
Event	Gold	Silver	Bronze
48 kg	Samia Salim; Egypt	Elaheh Mansourian; Iran	Öznur Kızıl; Turkey
48 kg	Samia Salim; Egypt	Elaheh Mansourian; Iran	Cristina Toporâşte; Romania
52 kg	E Meidie; China	Evelyn Beleño; Venezuela	Ayşegül Behlivan; Turkey
52 kg	E Meidie; China	Evelyn Beleño; Venezuela	Ana Cláudia Rodrigues; Brazil
56 kg	Li Hui; China	Razieh Tahmasebifar; Iran	Kim In-hye; South Korea
56 kg	Li Hui; China	Razieh Tahmasebifar; Iran	Gemma Salter; Great Britain
60 kg	Wang Guixian; China	Ahlem Grissette; Tunisia	Gülşah Kıyak; Turkey
60 kg	Wang Guixian; China	Ahlem Grissette; Tunisia	Aurélie Nicole; France
65 kg	Khadijeh Azadpour; Iran	María Cariaco; Venezuela	Valérie Domergue; France
65 kg	Khadijeh Azadpour; Iran	María Cariaco; Venezuela	Margarita Kalmikova; Russia
70 kg	Zhong Yan; China	Hayat Farag; Egypt	Sandy El-Hawa; Lebanon
70 kg	Zhong Yan; China	Hayat Farag; Egypt	Aline Loue; France
75 kg	Maliheh Fazli; Iran	Jamie Forter; Canada	Laura Frangu; Romania
75 kg	Maliheh Fazli; Iran	Jamie Forter; Canada	Antonia Di Biase; Italy
