= Tai Chi Hero =

2012 Hong Kong-Chinese film by Stephen Fung

- China poster
- Directed by: Stephen Fung
- Written by: Chang Chia-lu; Cheng Hsiao-tse
- Story by: Chen Kuo-fu
- Produced by: Zhang Dajun; Stephen Fung; Daniel Wu; Wang Zhonglei; Chen Kuo-fu
- Starring: Tony Leung Ka-fai; Jayden Yuan; Angelababy; Eddie Peng; William Feng
- Cinematography: Peter Ngor; Lai Yiu-fai; Du Jie
- Edited by: Cheng Hsiao-tse; Matthew Hui; Zhang Weili
- Music by: Ishida Katsunori
- Release date: 25 October 2012
- Running time: 102 minutes
- Countries: Hong Kong; China
- Language: Mandarin

Tai Chi Hero (太極2 英雄崛起) is a 2012 3D martial arts film directed by Stephen Fung, written and produced by Chen Kuo-fu. A Hong Kong-Chinese co-production, the film is the sequel to Fung's 2012 film Tai Chi Zero. It was released in Hong Kong on 25 October 2012. It is to be followed by a third as yet undeveloped movie named Tai Chi Summit.

== Synopsis ==
The continuing adventure of Yang Lu Chan as he bumbles his way through learning Chen-style kung fu, which is later named by Prince Dun as "Tai Chi", henceforth no longer known as just Chen style. Yang Lu Chan evolves from the bumbling idiot into the first stage of being the most formidable Tai Chi Master and wins the heart of Chen Yu Niang, daughter of the Chen Grandmaster.

== Cast ==
- Yuan Wen Kang as Prince Dun
- Jayden Yuan as Yang Lu Chan
- Angelababy as Chen Yu Niang
- Shu Qi as Mother Yang
- Stephen Fung as Nan
- Xiong Xin Xin as Uncle Qin
- Shen Si as Brother Tofu
- Wei Ai Xuan as Zhao Di
- Eddie Peng (credited as Eddie Peng Yu-Yen as Fang Zi Jing
- Feng Shao Feng as Chen Zai Yang
- Wu Di as Chen You Zhi
- Chen Si Cheng as Chen Geng Yun
- Xiong NaiJing as Chen Geng Yun's wife
- Tony Leung Ka Fai as Chen Chang Xing
- Feng Tsui Fan as Grand Uncle
- Nikki Hsieh as Jin Yuner
- Patrick Tse as 10th Grandmaster
- Daniel Wu as Mad Monk
- Peter Stormare as Flamming
- Ying Da as Governor
- Yuen Biao as Li Qiankun
