= 2007 World Wushu Championships =

9th Edition of the World Wushu Championships

- Venue: Olympic Sports Center Gymnasium
- Location: Beijing, China
- Start date: November 11, 2007
- End date: November 17, 2007
- Competitors: 1000 from 89 nations

The 2007 World Wushu Championships was the 9th edition of the World Wushu Championships. It was held at the Olympic Sports Center Gymnasium in Beijing, China from November 11 to November 17, 2007. Nearly 1,000 athletes from 89 IWUF national federations participated in the event. The competition also acted as a qualifier for the 2008 Beijing Wushu Tournament and the 2009 World Games.

== Medal table ==
* Host nation (China)

Rank	NOC	Gold	Silver	Bronze	Total
1	China*	18	0	0	18
2	Macau	3	5	4	12
3	Vietnam	3	4	7	14
4	Russia	3	3	5	11
5	Hong Kong	2	4	4	10
6	Chinese Taipei	2	3	0	5
7	Iran	1	5	3	9
8	Malaysia	1	2	4	7
9	Philippines	1	2	2	5
10	Japan	1	1	3	5
11	Italy	1	1	2	4
12	Indonesia	1	1	0	2
13	Great Britain	1	0	1	2
13	Turkey	1	0	1	2
15	Netherlands	1	0	0	1
16	South Korea	0	3	3	6
17	Egypt	0	2	2	4
18	Myanmar	0	1	3	4
19	France	0	1	1	2
20	Argentina	0	1	0	1
20	India	0	1	0	1
22	Belarus	0	0	2	2
22	Brazil	0	0	2	2
22	Canada	0	0	2	2
25	Greece	0	0	1	1
25	Kazakhstan	0	0	1	1
25	North Korea	0	0	1	1
25	Spain	0	0	1	1
25	Switzerland	0	0	1	1
25	Tunisia	0	0	1	1
Totals (30 entries)		40	40	57	137

== Medalists ==
=== Men's taolu ===
Event	Gold	Silver	Bronze
Changquan	Yuan Xiaochao; China	Aung Si Thu; Myanmar	Ang Eng Chong; Malaysia
Daoshu	Zhao Qingjian; China	Jia Rui; Macau	Aung Si Thu; Myanmar
Gunshu	Jia Rui; Macau	Hsiao Yung-sheng; Chinese Taipei	Trần Đức Trọng; Vietnam
Jianshu	Gogi Nebulana; Indonesia	Liu Yang; Hong Kong	Lim Yew Fai; Malaysia
Qiangshu	Hei Zhihong; Hong Kong	Liu Yang; Hong Kong	Lim Yew Fai; Malaysia
Nanquan	Willy Wang; Philippines	Heryanto; Indonesia	Arata Matsuura; Japan
Nandao	Phạm Quốc Khánh; Vietnam	Pui Fook Chien; Malaysia	Leong Hong Man; Macau
Nangun	Zhou Jing; China	Stanislav Galkin; Russia	Farshad Arabi; Iran
Taijiquan	Wu Yanan; China	Chang Ching-kuei; Chinese Taipei	Nguyễn Thanh Tùng; Vietnam
Taijijian	Yoshihiro Shimoda; Japan	Lee Jae-hyung; South Korea	Hei Zhihong; Hong Kong
Duilian	Chinese Taipei; Hsu Kai-kuei; Hsiao Yung-sheng; Hsiao Yung-jih	Vietnam; Trần Đức Trọng; Trần Xuân Hiệp	Myanmar; Aung Si Thu; Myo Min Soe

=== Women's taolu ===
Event	Gold	Silver	Bronze
Changquan	Daria Tarasova; Russia	Xi Cheng Qing; Macau	Geng Xiaoling; Hong Kong
Daoshu	Xu Huihui; Italy	Geng Xiaoling; Hong Kong	Chai Fong Wei; Malaysia
Gunshu	Cao Jing; China	Xi Cheng Qing; Macau	Daria Tarasova; Russia
Jianshu	Zhang Chunyan; China	Han Jing; Macau	Vũ Trà My; Vietnam
Qiangshu	Ma Lingjuan; China	Vũ Trà My; Vietnam	Han Jing; Macau
Nanquan	Lin Fan; China	Diana Bong; Malaysia	Law Sum Yin; Hong Kong
Nandao	Huang Yan Hui; Macau	Erika Kojima; Japan	Vũ Thùy Linh; Vietnam
Nangun	Huang Hsiao-chien; Chinese Taipei	Huang Yan Hui; Macau	Samantha Tjhia; Canada
Taijiquan	Chai Fong Ying; Malaysia	Peggie Ho; Hong Kong	Ai Miyaoka; Japan
Taijijian	Cui Wenjuan; China	Fan Man-yun; Chinese Taipei	Ai Miyaoka; Japan
Duilian	Hong Kong; Law Sum Yin; Yuen Ka Ying; Peggie Ho	Vietnam; Vũ Trà My; Vũ Thùy Linh	Macau; Han Jing; Huang Yan Hui

=== Men's sanda ===
Event	Gold	Silver	Bronze
48 kg	He Guangrong; China	Ahmed Mustafa; Egypt	Choe Seung-bin; South Korea
48 kg	He Guangrong; China	Ahmed Mustafa; Egypt	Vũ Văn Linh; Vietnam
52 kg	Hüseyin Dündar; Turkey	Nguyễn Trí Quân; Vietnam	Lim Seung-chang; South Korea
52 kg	Hüseyin Dündar; Turkey	Nguyễn Trí Quân; Vietnam	Wong Ting Hong; Hong Kong
56 kg	Zhang Shuaike; China	Nazir Shandulaev; Russia	Qin Zhi Jian; Macau
56 kg	Zhang Shuaike; China	Nazir Shandulaev; Russia	Benjie Rivera; Philippines
60 kg	Yu Feibiao; China	Yu Hyeon-seok; South Korea	Siarhei Ivanou; Belarus
60 kg	Yu Feibiao; China	Yu Hyeon-seok; South Korea	Won To-song; North Korea
65 kg	Zhang Yong; China	Yunus Guseinov; Russia	Jung Sung-hun; South Korea
65 kg	Zhang Yong; China	Yunus Guseinov; Russia	Vũ Hoàng Trung; Vietnam
70 kg	Cai Liang Chan; Macau	Yoon Soon-myung; South Korea	Murad Akhadov; Russia
70 kg	Cai Liang Chan; Macau	Yoon Soon-myung; South Korea	Ahmed Ibrahim; Egypt
75 kg	Dzhanhuat Beletov; Russia	Eslam Ghorbani; Iran	Issam Barhoumi; Tunisia
75 kg	Dzhanhuat Beletov; Russia	Eslam Ghorbani; Iran	Francesco De Tulio; Italy
80 kg	Hamid Reza Gholipour; Iran	Daniele Chiofalo; Italy	Konstantinos Vetimis; Greece
80 kg	Hamid Reza Gholipour; Iran	Daniele Chiofalo; Italy	Roland Zwingli; Switzerland
85 kg	Muslim Salikhov; Russia	Hossein Ojaghi; Iran	Nicholas Evagorou; Great Britain
85 kg	Muslim Salikhov; Russia	Hossein Ojaghi; Iran	Emerson Almeida; Brazil
90 kg	Yu Jin; China	Ali Asghar Shabani; Iran	Khalid Asem; Egypt
90 kg	Yu Jin; China	Ali Asghar Shabani; Iran	Alfonso Valcárcel; Spain
+90 kg	Leendert-Jan Mulder; Netherlands	Anael Carrasco; Argentina	Meirman Rakhymzhanov; Kazakhstan
+90 kg	Leendert-Jan Mulder; Netherlands	Anael Carrasco; Argentina	Aliaksandr Pantsiukhou; Belarus

=== Women's sanda ===
Event	Gold	Silver	Bronze
48 kg	Nguyễn Thị Bích; Vietnam	Jennifer Lagilag; Philippines	Naw Mar Htun; Myanmar
48 kg	Nguyễn Thị Bích; Vietnam	Jennifer Lagilag; Philippines	Khadijeh Zeinalzadeh; Iran
52 kg	Qin Lizi; China	Mary Jane Estimar; Philippines	Farzaneh Dehghani; Iran
52 kg	Qin Lizi; China	Mary Jane Estimar; Philippines	Nguyễn Thùy Ngân; Vietnam
56 kg	E Meidie; China	Razieh Tahmasebifar; Iran	Ekaterina Mukhortikova; Russia
56 kg	E Meidie; China	Razieh Tahmasebifar; Iran	Ana Cláudia Rodrigues; Brazil
60 kg	Lương Thị Hoa; Vietnam	Zahra Karimi; Iran	Mariane Mariano; Philippines
60 kg	Lương Thị Hoa; Vietnam	Zahra Karimi; Iran	Kristina Naumova; Russia
65 kg	Wu Jiao; China	Sophia Viallet; France	Nurhayat Hiçyakmazer; Turkey
65 kg	Wu Jiao; China	Sophia Viallet; France	Margarita Kalmikova; Russia
70 kg	Sun Hui; China	Hayat Farag; Egypt	Aline Loue; France
70 kg	Sun Hui; China	Hayat Farag; Egypt	Francesca Schito; Italy
75 kg	Michelle Manser; Great Britain	Hidam Gangapati Chanu; India	Natalie Moi; Canada
75 kg	Michelle Manser; Great Britain	Hidam Gangapati Chanu; India	None awarded
