= Denis Ursu =

Romanian professional footballer

Personal information
- Full name: Denis Cosmin Ursu
- Date of birth: 10 January 2004 (age 22)
- Place of birth: Mediaș, Romania
- Position: Midfielder

Team information
- Current team: 1599 Șelimbăr
- Number: 11

Youth career
- Gaz Metan Mediaș

Senior career*
Years	Team	Apps	(Gls)
2021–2022	Gaz Metan Mediaș	12	(0)
2022–2024	1599 Șelimbăr	9	(1)
2023–2024	-> ACS Mediaș (loan)	?	(?)
- * Club domestic league appearances and goals as of 1 June 2023

Denis Cosmin Ursu (born 10 January 2004) is a Romanian professional footballer who plays as a midfielder for Liga II side CSC 1599 Șelimbăr. He made his Liga I debut for Gaz Metan Mediaș, in a match against Dinamo București.
