= Sanda (sport) =

Chinese self-defense system and combat sport

Sanda / Sanshou (散打 / 散手)
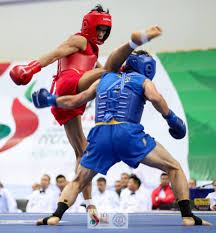
- Also known as: Sanshou, Chinese boxing, Chinese kickboxing, free combat
- Focus: Hybrid
- Hardness: Full-contact
- Country of origin: Republic of China
- Famous practitioners: See below
- Parenthood: Changquan, bajiquan, Northern Shaolin, shuai jiao, Chin Na, wushu, Choy Li Fut, Tai Chi, piguaquan, Kickboxing

Sanda
- Chinese: 散打
- Literal meaning: free fighting
Transcriptions
Standard Mandarin
- Hanyu Pinyin: sǎndǎ

Sanshou
- Chinese: 散手
- Literal meaning: free hand
Transcriptions
Standard Mandarin
- Hanyu Pinyin: sǎnshǒu

Sanda (Chinese: 散打; pinyin: Sǎndǎ), formerly Sanshou (Chinese: 散手; pinyin: Sǎnshǒu), is the official full-contact kickboxing combat sport of China. In Chinese, "Sanda" originally referred to independent and separate training and combat techniques in contrast to "Taolu" (pre-arranged forms or routines).

Sanda is a fighting system which was originally developed by the Chinese military based upon the study and practices of traditional Chinese martial arts and modern combat fighting techniques; it combines boxing and full-contact kickboxing, which includes close range and rapid successive punches and kicks, with wrestling, takedowns, throws, sweeps, kick catches, and in some competitions, even elbow and knee strikes.

As part of the development of sport wushu by the Chinese government, a standard curriculum for Sanda was developed. It is to this standard curriculum that the term Wushu Sanda is usually applied. Sanda may also involve techniques from any other fighting style depending on the teacher's mode of instruction.

== History ==
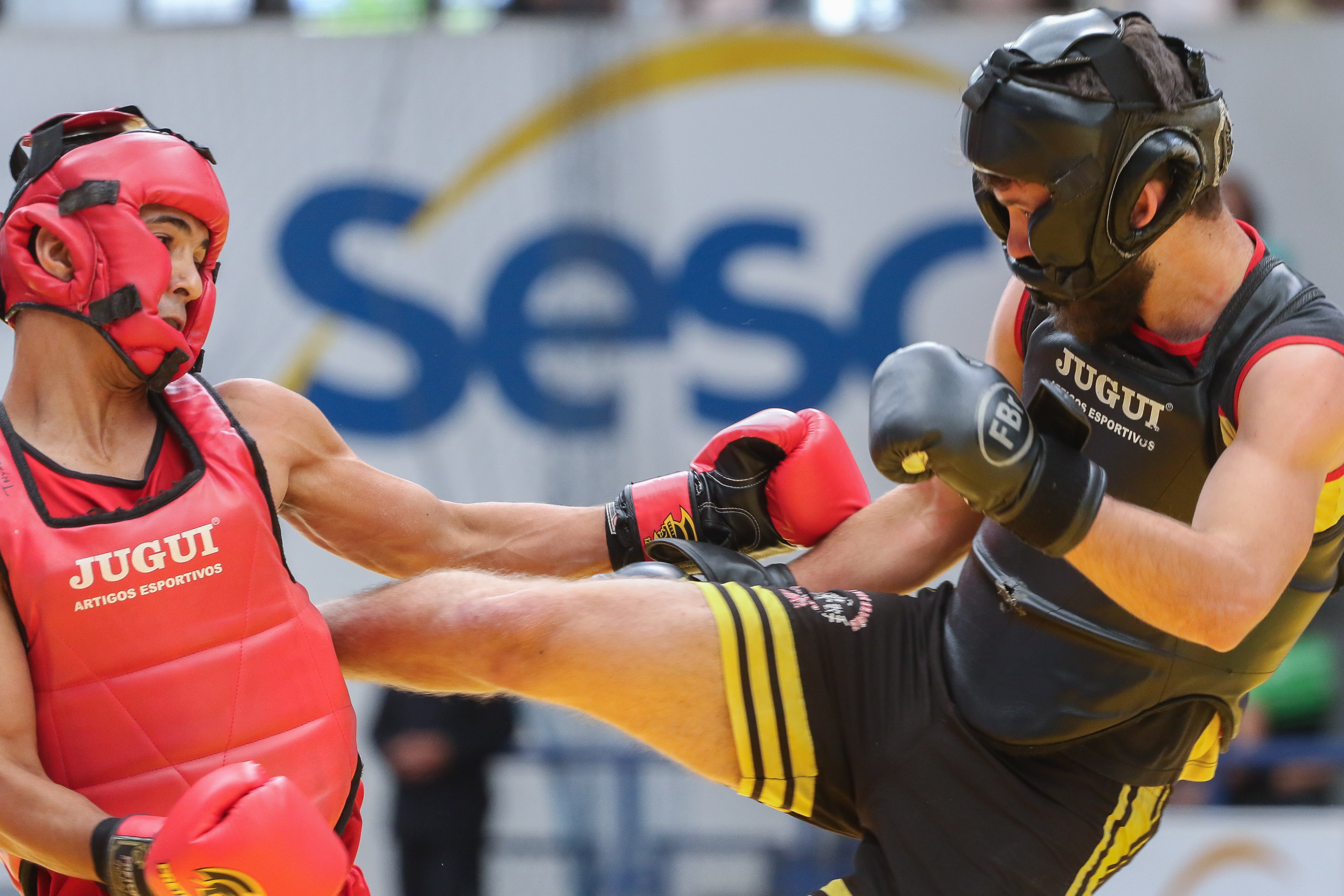
A Sanda match in Brazil.

Sanda's competitive history is rooted in barehanded elevated arena or Lei Tai fights in which no rules were observed. However, Sanda as a competitive event developed in the military as these bouts were commonly held between the soldiers to test and practice barehanded martial skills, ability and techniques. Rules were developed and the use of protective gloves etc. was adopted. It was originally used by the Kuomintang at the first modern military academy in Whampoa in the 1920s. In 1928, the Central Kuoshu Academy was formed, and they sponsored a full-contact tournament. When the Kuomintang government moved to Taiwan, they began holding a full-contact tournament in the 1950s, calling it lei tai. The sport was also adopted as a method by the People's Liberation Army of China, and subsequently civilian competitions developed. Sanda's curriculum as a competitive sport was developed with reference to traditional Chinese martial arts, but since the goal in sports is "winning the match", techniques were adapted to make the activity scoring-oriented. This general Wushu Sanda curriculum varies in its different forms, as the Chinese government developed a version for civilians for self-defense and as a sport.

== Curriculum ==
The generalized modern curriculum practiced in modern wushu schools is composed of different traditional martial arts fighting styles from China and Western Boxing, but mainly based on scientific efficiency. Wushu Sanda is composed of Chinese martial arts applications including most aspects of combat including striking and grappling, however when Wushu Sanda was developed as a sport, restrictions were made for safety reasons as well as to promote it as a non-violent sport. Examples of such restrictions included no blows delivered to the back of the head, throat, spine or groin and the discontinuation of the combat when any of the fighters fall to the ground. However many schools, whether traditional or modern, practice it as an all-round martial arts system with no restrictions, only adapting their training in relation to competition rules prior to the event. Sanda tournaments are one of the two disciplines recognized by the International Wushu Federation.

Hand Strikes

- Jab
- Cross
- Hook
- Overhand
- Uppercut
- Back-fist

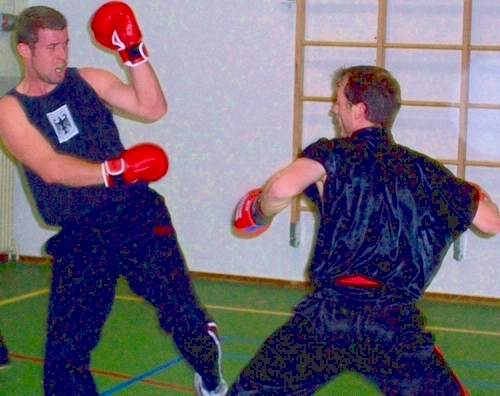
Two Dutch fighters in a sparring session of Sanshou.

Elbows and Knees

- Horizontal
- Vertical
- Diagonal

Kicks

- Front Kick
- Side Kick
- Sweep Kicks
- Spinning Back Kick
- Roundhouse Kick
- Axe kick

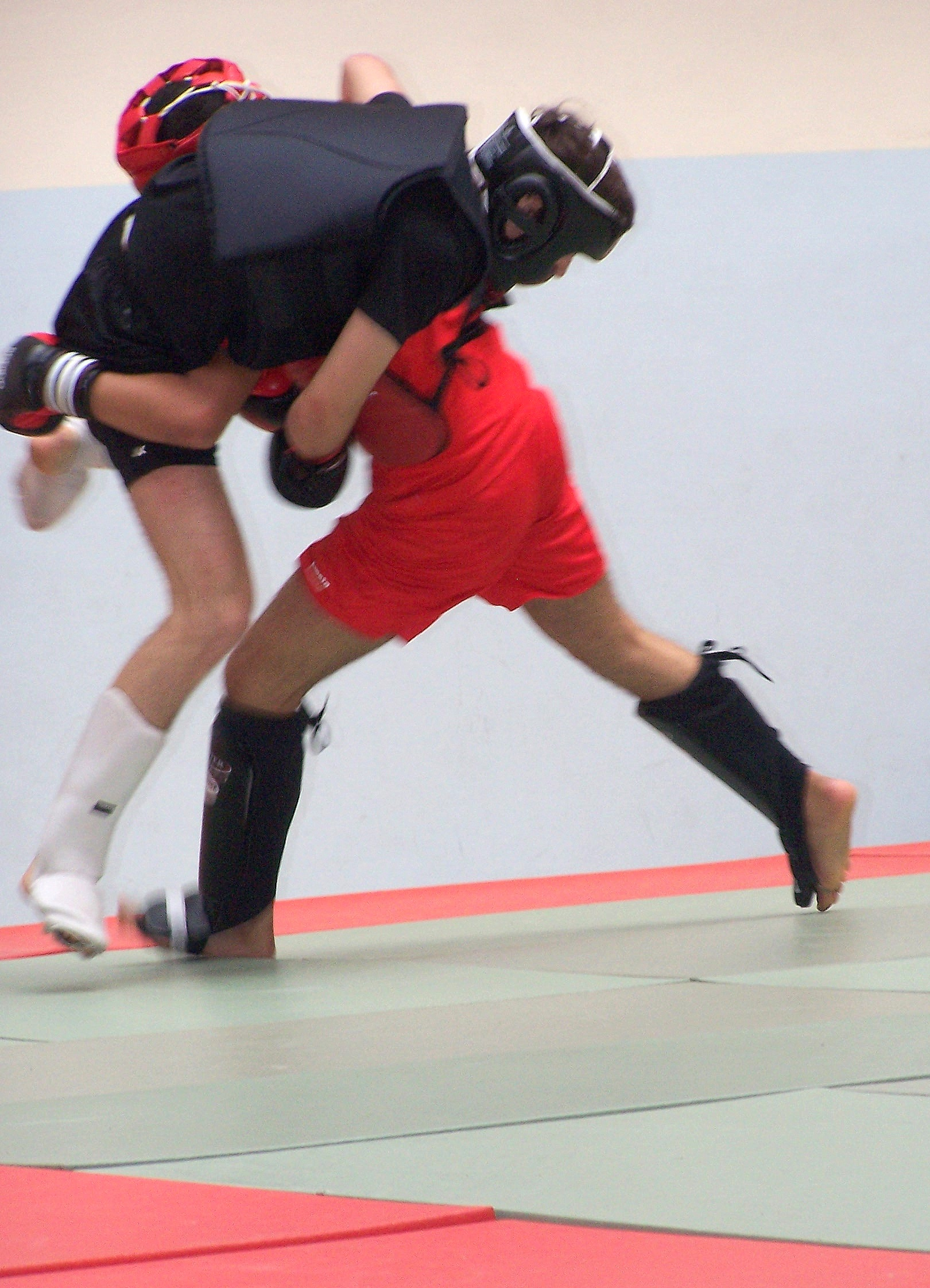
Sanda fighter attempts a double leg takedown on his opponent

Throws

- Hip Throw
- Shoulder Throw
- Sweep
- Double leg takedowns
- Single leg takedowns
- Body lock takedowns
- Kick catch throws
- Trips
- Scissor takedown

One can see Sanda as a synthesis of traditional Chinese fighting techniques into a more amorphous system. It is commonly taught alongside traditional Chinese styles, from which Wushu Sanda techniques, theory and training methods are derived. The emphasis of Sanda is on a more amorphous fighting ability.

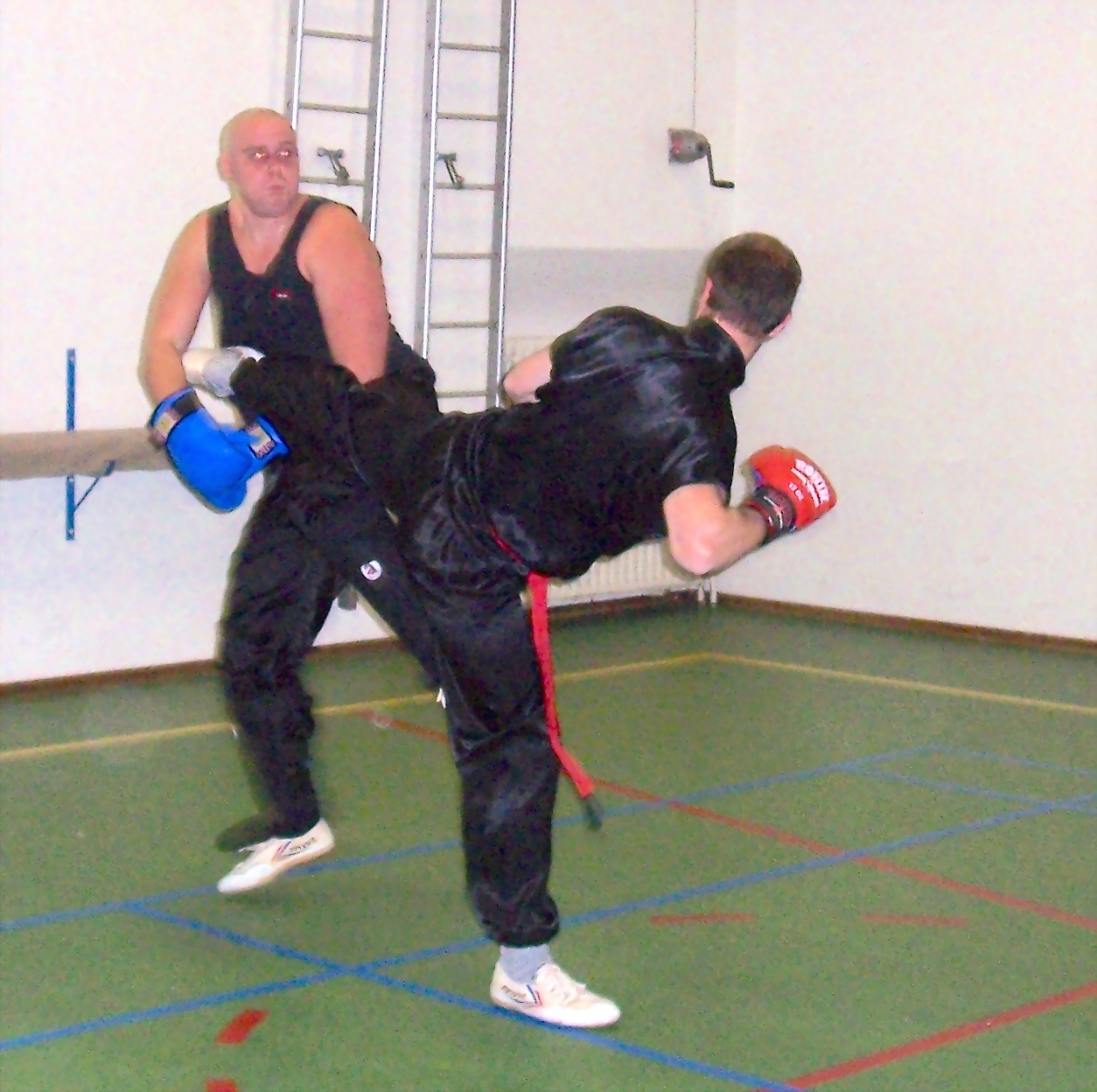
A Sanda kick

== Sport variation ==
Yundong Sanda (Chinese: 运动散打; pinyin: Yùndòng Sàndǎ) or Jinzheng Sanda (Chinese: 竞争散打; pinyin: Jìngzhēng Sàndǎ): A modern fighting method, sport, and applicable component of Wushu / Kung Fu influenced by traditional Chinese Boxing, in which takedowns & throws are legal in competition.

Sanda appears much like kickboxing but includes many more grappling techniques. Sanda fighting competitions are often held alongside taolu or form competitions. Sanda represents the modern development of Lei Tai contests, but with rules in place to reduce the chance of serious injury. Many Chinese martial art schools teach or work within the rule sets of Sanda, working to incorporate the movements, characteristics, and theory of their style.

Chinese martial artists also compete in non-Chinese or mixed combat sports, including boxing, kickboxing and mixed martial arts. Sanda is practiced in tournaments and is normally held alongside taolu events in wushu competition. For safety reasons, some techniques from the self-defense form such as elbow strikes, chokes, and joint locks, are not allowed during tournaments. Competitors can win by knockout or points which are earned by landing strikes to the body or head, throwing an opponent, or when competition is held on a raised lei tai platform, pushing them off the platform. Fighters are only allowed to clinch for a few seconds. If the clinch is not broken by the fighters, and if neither succeeds in throwing his opponent within the time limit, the referee will break the clinch. In the U.S., competitions are held either in boxing rings or on the raised lei tai platform. Amateur fighters wear protective gear.

"Amateur Sanda" allows kicks, punches, knees (not to the head), and throws. A competition held in China, called the "King of Sanda", is held in a ring similar to a boxing ring in design but larger in dimension. As professionals, they wear no protective gear except for gloves, cup, and mouthpiece, and "Professional Sanda" allows knee strikes (including to the head) as well as kicking, punching and throwing.

Some Sanda fighters have participated in fighting tournaments such as K-1 and Shoot boxing. They have had a degree of success, especially in Shoot boxing competitions, which is more similar to Sanda. Due to the rules of kickboxing competition, Sanda fighters are subjected to more limitations than usual. Also notable competitors in China's mainstream Mixed Martial Arts competitions, Art of War Fighting Championship and Ranik Ultimate Fighting Federation are dominantly of wushu Sanda background. Sanda coach, Zhao Xuejun played a significant role in helping transition Sanda fighters to MMA. Although it is less common, some Sanda practitioners have also fought in American Mixed Martial Arts competitions such as the UFC and Strikeforce. Sanda has been featured in many style-versus-style competitions. Muay Thai is frequently pitted against Sanda as is Karate, kickboxing, and Taekwondo.

== Military variation ==
Junshi Sanda (Chinese: 军事散打; pinyin: Jūnshì Sǎndǎ): A system of unarmed combat that was designed by Chinese Elite Forces based upon their intense study of traditional martial arts such as traditional Kung Fu, Shuai Jiao, Chin Na and modern hand-to-hand fighting and combat philosophy to develop a realistic system of unarmed fighting for the Chinese military. Junshi Sanda employs all parts of the body as anatomical weapons to attack and counter with, by using what the Chinese consider to be the four basic martial arts techniques:

- Da – Upper-Body Striking – using fists, open hands, fingers, elbows, shoulders, forearms and the head
- Ti – Lower-Body Striking – including kicks, knees and stomping
- Shuai – Throws – using wrestling and Judo-like takedowns and sweeps, and
- Chin-Na – Seizing – which includes jointlocks, strangulation and other submissions

== Competitions ==
The International Wushu Federation (IWUF) promotes wushu and is the governing body for wushu in all its forms worldwide. Sanda and taolu (forms) are the two categories of competitive sport wushu. The IWUF is recognized by the International Olympic Committee (IOC).

=== World Wushu Championships ===
Number	Year	Host city, Country
1	1991	Beijing, China
2	1993	Kuala Lumpur, Malaysia
3	1995	Baltimore, United States
4	1997	Rome, Italy
5	1999	Hung Hom Bay, Hong Kong
6	2001	Yerevan, Armenia
7	2003	Freguesia da Sé, Macau
8	2005	Hanoi, Vietnam
9	2007	Beijing, China
10	2009	Toronto, Canada
11	2011	Ankara, Turkey
12	2013	Kuala Lumpur, Malaysia
13	2015	Jakarta, Indonesia
14	2017	Kazan, Russia
15	2019	Shanghai, China
16	2023	Fort Worth, United States
17	2025	Brasília, Brazil

=== Sanda World Cup ===
No.	Year	Host city, Country
1	2002	Shanghai, China
2	2004	Guangzhou, China
3	2006	Xi'an, China
4	2008	Harbin, China
5	2010	Chongqing, China
6	2012	Wuyishan, China
7	2014	Jakarta, Indonesia
8	2016	Xi'an, China
9	2018	Hangzhou, China
10	2025	Jiangyin, China

Some other competions

- World Junior wushu champoinchips
- European wushu champoinchips (only for european countries)
- Asian wushu Champoinchips (only for asian countries)

== Notable practitioners ==
=== Sanda ===
- Liu Hailong
- Kong Hongxing
- Bao Ligao
- Zhang Kaiyin
- Hossein Ojaghi
- Hamid Reza Gholipour
- Mohsen Mohammadseifi
- Erfan Ahangarian
- Khadijeh Azadpour
- Elaheh Mansourian
- Hüseyin Dündar
- Gülşah Kıyak
- Mohammed Al-Ashwal
- Shahrbanoo Mansourian

=== Kickboxing ===
- Fang Bian
- Wei Rui
- Daniel Ghiță
- Cătălin Zmărăndescu
- Andrei Stoica
- Bogdan Stoica
- Dong Wenfei
- Jia Aoqi
- Yang Zhuo
- Bai Jinbin
- Zhu Shuai
- Xu Yan
- Xie Lei
- Jin Ying
- Qiu Jianliang
- Wang Cong
- Zheng Junfeng
- E Meidie
- Wang Kehan
- Liu Ce
- Ouyang Feng
- Kiew Parunchai

=== Mixed martial arts ===
- Zhang Weili
- Cung Le
- Eduard Folayang
- Joshua Pacio
- Tom Woods
- Kevin Belingon
- Muslim Salikhov
- Zabit Magomedsharipov
- Khasan Magomedsharipov
- Shamil Musaev
- Bozigit Ataev
- Karimula Barkalaev
- Karl Albrektsson
- Shamil Abdurakhimov
- Norma Dumont
- Song Yadong
- Pat Barry
- K.J. Noons
- Alessio Sakara
- Mark Eddiva
- Song Kenan
- Li Jingliang
- Yan Xiaonan
- Su Mudaerji
- Zhang Mingyang
- Tofiq Musayev
- Arkadiusz Wrzosek
- Timur Khizriev

=== Lethwei ===
- Dave Leduc

=== Professional boxing ===
- Alessandro Riguccini

== See also ==
- Kickboxing
- Folk wrestling
- Kumite
- Shoot boxing
- Sambo
- Muay Thai
- Lethwei
- Pradal
