= Hamid Reza Gholipour =

Iranian wushu athlete (born 1988)

Medal record
Representing Iran
Men's sanda
Asian Games
Gold medal – first place	2010 Guangzhou	75 kg
World Championships
Gold medal – first place	2007 Beijing	80 kg
Gold medal – first place	2011 Ankara	85 kg
Gold medal – first place	2013 Kuala Lumpur	85 kg
Gold medal – first place	2015 Jakarta	90 kg
Silver medal – second place	2009 Toronto	85 kg
Silver medal – second place	2017 Kazan	+90 kg
World Junior Championships
Gold medal – first place	2006 Kuala Lumpur	80kg
World Games
Gold medal – first place	2008 Kaohsiung	85kg
Gold medal – first place	2013 Cali	85kg
World Cup
Gold medal – first place	2014 Jakarta	85kg
Gold medal – first place	2016 Xi'an	90kg
Silver medal – second place	2008 Harbin	80kg
Silver medal – second place	2018 Hangzhou	+90kg
World Combat Games
Silver medal – second place	2010 Beijing	85 kg
Asian Championships
Silver medal – second place	2008 Macau	80 kg
Silver medal – second place	2012 Ho Chi Minh	85 kg

Hamid Reza Gholipour (born 26 June 1988) is an Iranian wushu athlete. He is a four-time Wushu World Champion. Gholipour received a four-year ban after testing positive for the anabolic steroid nandrolone, starting in October 2019, and disqualified from the 15th World Wushu Championships in Shanghai, and the results at the competition forfeited.
