= World University Softball Championship =

Women's softball tournament

- Sport: Softball
- Founded: 2004
- No. of teams: 6 (Finals)
- Continent: International
- Most recent champion: United States
- Most titles: United States (2)

The World University Softball Championship is an under-28 softball tournament for women's national teams held by the International Softball Federation (ISF).

Softball Championships were held in 2004 and 2006; in 2007 it was an optional sport at the Summer Universiade. 2012 was to be the third rendition of the World University Softball Championship in Colorado Springs, Colorado, but was canceled due to a lack of entries. In 2020, the softball championship will be held together with men's baseball championship.

== Results ==
Year	Final Host	Medalists			
Year	Final Host	Champions	Final score	Runners-up	3rd place
2004; Details	(United States); Plant City	United States	1 – 0	Chinese Taipei	Japan
2006; Details	(Taiwan) Tainan	United States	4 – 3	Chinese Taipei	Japan

=== Medal table ===
Rank	Nation	Gold	Silver	Bronze	Total
1	United States	2	0	0	2
2	Chinese Taipei	0	2	0	2
3	Japan	0	0	2	2
Totals (3 entries)		2	2	2	6

=== As a Summer Universiade sport ===
Year	Final Host	Medalists			
Year	Final Host	Champions	Final score	Runners-up	3rd place
2007; Details	(Thailand); Bangkok	Canada	4 – 3	Chinese Taipei	Japan
