= European Wushu Championships =

International martial art competition

- Genre: European event
- Inaugurated: 1986
- Founder: IWUF, WKFE
- Most recent: 2025
- Next event: 2026 European Wushu Championships in France-Lyon
- Organiser: WKFE
- Sponsors: WESING and Taishan
- Website: https://www.wkfe.org/

The European Wushu Championships is a wushu competition organized by the European Wushu Federation, an official continental federation of the International Wushu Federation. The first championships were held in Brussels, Belgium in May 1986, with 70 athletes from eight participating member countries.

== Championships ==
=== European Wushu Championships (Senior / Junior) ===
Year	Senior	Junior	Location
1986	1	-	Brussels, Belgium
1987	2	-	Barcelona, Spain
1989	3	-	Chieti, Italy Stockholm, Sweden
1992	4	-	London, United Kingdom
1994	5	-	Munich, Germany
1996	6	-	Rome, Italy
1998	7	-	Athens, Greece
2000	8	1	Rotterdam, Netherlands
2002	9	2	Póvoa de Varzim, Portugal
2004	10	3	Moscow, Russia
2006	11	4	Lignano Sabbiadoro, Italy
2008	12	5	Warsaw, Poland
2010	13	6	Antalya, Turkey
2012	14	7	Tallinn, Estonia
2014	15	8	Bucharest, Romania
2016	16	9	Moscow, Russia
2018	17	10	Moscow, Russia
2023	18	11	Istanbul, Turkey
2024	19	12	Stockholm, Sweden
2026	20 (upcoming)	13	Lyon, France

- European Traditional Wushu (Kungfu) Championships

Year	Edition	Location
2011	1	Estonia
2013	2	Romania
2015	3	Bulgaria
2017	4	Georgia
2019	5	Russia
2022	6	Greece
2025	7	Greece

=== European Taijiquan and Internal Styles Wushu Championships ===
Year	Edition	Location
2014	1	Romania
2016	2	Russia

=== European Yongchunquan (Wingchun) Championships ===
Year	Edition	Location
2015	1	Bulgaria
2017	2	Georgia

== EUWUF Championships ==
=== European Wushu Championships (Senior / Junior) ===
Year	Senior	Junior	Location
2022	1	1	Burgas, Bulgaria

== Results ==
Some of results between 1996 - 2004:

- http://www.sport-komplett.de/sport-komplett/sportarten/index_sportarten.htm
- http://www.sport-komplett.de/sport-komplett/sportarten/w/wushu/wushu.htm
- http://www.sport-komplett.de/sport-komplett/sportarten/w/wushu/_historie.htm
- Women Taolu: http://www.sport-komplett.de/sport-komplett/sportarten/w/wushu/hst/7.html
- Women Sanda: No events between 1996 - 2004.
- Men Sanda: http://www.sport-komplett.de/sport-komplett/sportarten/w/wushu/hst/8.html
- Men Taolu: http://www.sport-komplett.de/sport-komplett/sportarten/w/wushu/hst/9.html
