= Rising Shaolin: The Protector =

2021 Chinese martial arts film

- Film poster
- 少林寺之得宝传奇
- Directed by: Stanley Tong
- Written by: Shu Huan
- Produced by: Stanley Tong; Barbie Tung
- Starring: Wang Baoqiang
- Music by: Nathan Wang
- Production company: Beijing Happy Pictures
- Distributed by: iQIYI (China)
- Release date: February 12, 2021; (Internet)
- Running time: 93 minutes
- Country: China
- Language: Mandarin

Rising Shaolin: The Protector (Chinese: 少林寺之得宝传奇; pinyin: Shaolin sì zhi De bao chuanqí; lit. 'Shaolin Temple: Legend of Debao') is a 2021 Mandarin-language Chinese action adventure martial arts film directed by Stanley Tong.

== Plot ==
Debao runs a scam in which his friends pose as robbers, frightening travelers. Debao pretends to be a general who appears, saves the travelers from danger and then leads them to a hotel that Debao and his friends happen to operate so that they can sell rooms and trinkets to the travelers. When an old monk sets up a modest house and vegetable farm at their robbery location, they try to run him off by destroying his house but are instead defeated by his kung fu when they grab the "Shaolin Temple" sign from above his door. After they return to the hotel, an imperial envoy arrives and insists on staying in a particular room. Tu Hao and his friend spy on the guest and see him retrieve a map that had been hidden in the room by an earlier guest. He Xiao, magistrate of Lingzhou, appears and kills the imperial envoy, telling him that the map was not intended for him. He then makes the two spying men decide who will live to join him, turning his back. The friend attacks He Xiao, but Tu Hao kills his friend and vows to join He Xiao. Debao is accused of the murder of the imperial envoy, so he flees with his son. His son falls off a cliff and dies during the escape, but Debao is rescued by the old monk and given refuge in the Shaolin Temple.

Debao begs the monk to take him to his son. The monk makes Debao rebuild his house 18 times until it is sturdy enough. Then the monk makes Debao water and grow vegetables. The monk trains Debao physically and mentally and reveals that he also had a son who died. Tu Hao arrives and poisons the water Debao is carrying for the monk, then chases Debao through the woods as Debao carries the dying monk. Debao and the monk fall through the ground into a lake in an underground cavern, where Debao begs the monk to become his master. Before dying, the monk cuts Debao's hair and tells him to eliminate evil from his life, to show kindness, to help mankind, and to avoid revenge. Debao finds books about Shaolin martial arts in the cavern and studies them. When he is finally strong enough to kick through the stone wall below the Buddha statue, he discovers silver and gold hidden within it.

He Xiao tells Tu Hao that the map leads to the treasure of Shaolin martial arts. Tu Hao works for the governor of Lingzhou, then poisons him and takes over. He marries Debao's arranged bride Tie Daxue, who tries to stab him on their wedding night, but Tu Hao overpowers her. Tu Hao confronts Debao at a gambling hall but is unable to defeat him. The gambling hall is burnt down in the process. He Xiao confronts Tu Hao, who imprisons him. Tu Hao he places wanted posters for Debao around the city, claiming that Debao caused the fire. He then stages a public burning at the stake of Tie Daxue to lure out Debao. At Tu Hao's orders, Debao falsely confesses to murdering the former governor in order to save Tie Daxue. Debao is tossed in prison, where he finds his old friends from the hotel, who have been imprisoned for not working with Tu Hao. He Xiao, who has been impaled with nunchaku in a neighboring cell, pulls the nunchaku out of his torso and kills the guard, then gives the keys to Debao before dying.

The visiting crown prince chastises Tu Hao for living in abundance while his citizens live in squalor. Tu Hao says that the prince's eyesight is failing and begins killing the prince's guards. Tu Hao's soldiers assist him, but Debao and Tie Daxue arrive to save the prince. Tu Hao's soldiers surround them, but then a message arrives that the old king has died and that the prince is the new king. Everyone stops fighting and bows to the new king. The new king offers Debao the position as the new governor of Lingzhou, but Debao merely requests a new Shaolin temple to replace the one that was destroyed. The prince agrees and states that he will be Debao's devotee. When the prince asks for a new religious name, Debao gives him the name "Haoran". Debao tells Niu Jin that he can use the treasure found in the Shaolin cave to help the people of Lingzhou. He then departs from the city, leaving Tie Daxue.

== Cast ==
- Wang Baoqiang (王寶強) as Ximen Debao
- Ni Dahong (倪大紅) as Mong
- Ng Man-tat (吳孟達) as old merchant
- Liu Haoran (劉昊然) as the prince
- Du Guiyu (都桂宇) as Tu Hao
- Li Haidong as rich merchant
- Jiao Xingzhe
- Li Muzu
- Suolang Meiqi (索朗美淇) as Tie Daxue
- Wu Haibo as rich merchant
- Xiong Xinxin (熊欣欣) as Yuan Song
- Xu Jiajing as hostess
- Zhang Ye
- Zhu Weiye
- Cao Xuesong (曹雪松) as Niu Jin
- Sun Mingming (孫明明) as the hotel receptionist
- Hui Wangjun (惠王軍) as Mantou
- Bai Zeze (白澤澤) as Yourou
- Zhu He (朱賀) as Jin Wuchang
- Ren Xuehai (任學海) as the imperial envoy
- Wu Chao (吳超) as He Xiao, magistrate of Lingzhou
- Yu Hai (于海)

== Production and release ==
The film was produced under the working title The Legend of Shaolin Temple. The film started shooting on November 9, 2020, at Xiangshan Film and Television City and took more than 40 days to shoot.

Rising Shaolin: The Protector was released on the streaming sit iQIYI on February 12, 2021, the first day of Chinese New Year. It was also shown at the New York Asian Film Festival in the FLC Virtual Cinema on August 19, 2021.

== Homage to Shaolin Temple (1982) ==
Jet Li's pose in Shaolin Temple

Rising Shaolin: The Protector is an homage to the 1982 film Shaolin Temple. Lead actor Wang Baoqiang saw the film when he was 8 years old and was so impressed that he joined a Shaolin monastery, learned Shaolin martial arts, and followed in Jet Li's footsteps as an actor.

Reviewer LP Hugo considers Rising Shaolin: The Protector to be a direct homage to Shaolin Temple, "mirroring its progression from an action-comedy to a revenge tale to a redemptive coda".

The film features two actors who appeared in previous Shaolin Temple films: Yue Hoi, who appeared as Master Tan Chuan in Shaolin Temple (1982) and as Tin Lung in Kids from Shaolin (1984), and Xiong Xinxin, who appeared as a Shaolin stundent in Martial Arts of Shaolin (1986), as Tu Ying in the television production New Shaolin Temple (2000), and as Sou Xiang Tu in Shaolin (2011).

The theme song to Shaolin Temple (1982) is used during the training montage of Rising Shaolin: The Protector.

The poster art for Rising Shaolin: The Protector shows the Wang Baoqiang in the same pose that Jet Li made in the poster for Shaolin Temple.

== Reception ==
Reviewer LP Hugo of asianfilmstrike.com gave the film a rating of two out of five stars, writing, "Strangely, this is an almost cheap-looking film, its flat cinematography, pared-down sets and scattered extras evoking a midrange Chinese online movie rather than an epic directed by a blockbuster expert like Tong". The review continues, "But more damningly, the plot is so perfunctory that Deba's redemption has no impact whatsoever." The review concludes, "A few amusing gags and a passable final fight aside, Rising Shaolin: The Protector is visually flat, narratively perfunctory and shockingly low on fighting, squandering the talent and passion of Wang Baoqiang."

Reviewer DarkReif of bloodbrothersfilms.com gave the film a rating of three out of five, writing, "Perhaps my expectations were a bit high, although it would seem that Rising Shaolin does understand those expectations by delivering the multi-seasonal training montage and having the iconic actor Yu Hai as the Shaolin monk that our hero meets, but the pieces are often at odds with one another. Some fantastic fight work and a charismatic lead will definitely carry the film some distance, but unmemorable secondary characters, a cheap overall TV influenced look, and tonality inconsistencies are almost insurmountable for the film. Still, for kung fu fans, there is enough here to warrant a viewing if the film ever fully makes its way beyond the film festival circuit. It’s just not the instant nostalgia powered modern classic it might have been."

The Chinese site Tencent News reported, "The film has two characteristics: a simple story and many funny moments. It is suitable for everyone to watch it as a 'meal movie' during the Spring Festival and have a happy Spring Festival. [...] First, the story is simple, not demanding, and you can watch and eat at the same time. During the Spring Festival, you should relax and not watch one movie or one drama after another that makes you nervous and tired, right?"
