= Ji Chunhua =

Chinese actor (1961–2018)

- Born: July 20, 1961; Hangzhou, China
- Died: July 11, 2018 (aged 56); Hangzhou, China
- Education: Shanghai TV University
- Occupation: Actor
- Years active: 1980–2018

Chinese name
- Traditional Chinese: 計春華
- Simplified Chinese: 计春华
Transcriptions
Standard Mandarin
- Hanyu Pinyin: Jì Chūnhuá

Ji Chunhua (Chinese: 计春华; 20 July 1961 – 11 July 2018), sometimes romanized as Gai Chun Wa, was a Chinese actor and action choreographer. Just like Jet Li and Yu Chenghui, he was a Mainland China-trained wushu athlete who started his acting career in the 1982 Hong Kong martial arts blockbuster Shaolin Temple.

Ji had alopecia totalis and often appeared as bald villains in movies (many starring Jet Li) and TV series.

== Filmography ==
=== Films ===
Year	Title	Role	Notes
1982	Shaolin Temple (少林寺)	Tu Ying	
1984	Kids From Shaolin (少林小子)	one-eyed bandit	
1986	Martial Arts of Shaolin (南北少林)	Lord He's bodyguard	
1987	Red Sorghum (紅高粱)	Pu Sanbao	
1988	Yellow River Fighter (黄河大俠)	Lord Liu	
1989	Stealing Is No Crime (我愛賊阿爸)		
1990	Slaughter in Xian (西安殺戮)		
1991	Red Fists (聯手警探)	Panjiu	
1992	Deadend of Besiegers (武林聖鬥士)	Japanese pirate	
1993	Fong Sai-yuk II (方世玉續集)	Yu Chun-hoi	
1993	Kung Fu Vampire (湘西屍王)		
1993	Fist From Shaolin (黃飛鴻之男兒當報國)	Master Eleven	
1993	White Lotus Cult (白蓮邪神)	Cult Leader Chan	
1994	The New Legend of Shaolin (洪熙官)	Poison Juice Monster	uncredited
1996	Tai Chi II (太極拳)	Da Bu Liang	
2002	The Era of Vampires (殭屍大時代)	Master Mao Shan	
2006	My Kung-Fu Sweetheart (野蠻秘笈)		
2007	Legend of Twins Dragon (雙龍記)		
2008	Three Kingdoms: Resurrection of the Dragon (三國之見龍卸甲)	Cao Cao's vanguard general	
2010	Kung-fu Master (功夫大師)		
2011	Empire of Assassins (刺客帝國)	Wang's thug	
2015	Gun Transit		
2015	The Spirit of the Swords		

=== Television series ===
Year	Title	Role	Notes
2002	Shaolin King of Martial Arts (少林武王)	Tanfei	
2003	Demi-Gods and Semi-Devils (天龍八部)	Duan Yanqing	
2004	Lian Cheng Jue (連城訣)	Xuedao Laozu	
2005	Trail of the Everlasting Hero (俠影仙蹤)	Shi Kongchen	
2006	Legends of Xue Rengui (薛仁貴傳奇)	Yŏn Kaesomun	
2006	Seven Swordsmen (七劍下天山)	Xin Longzi	
2006/07	Wing Chun (詠春)		
2008	A Legend of Shaolin Temple (少林寺傳奇)	Sun Ba	
2010	A Legend of Shaolin Temple 2 (少林寺傳奇2)	Wang Renze	
2011	All Men Are Brothers (水滸傳)	Luan Tingyu	
2014	Royal Tramp (鹿鼎記)	Hai Dafu	
