= Zhao Qingjian =

Chinese wushu practitioner (born 1978)

Personal information
- Born: 15 March 1978 (age 48) Tai'an, Shandong, China
- Education: Wuhan Sports University
- Occupations: Martial artist, athlete, coach

Sport
- Sport: Wushu
- Events: Changquan, Daoshu, Gunshu
- Team: Shanwei Municipal Team (1990-1993); Beijing Wushu Team (2000-2009)
- Coached by: Mei Hanchao (1998-1999); Wu Bin (2000-2002); Yan Pinghe (2002-2009)
Medal record
Representing China
Men's Wushu Taolu
Olympic Games (unofficial)
Gold medal – first place	2008 Beijing	Daoshu+Gunshu
World Games
Gold medal – first place	2009 Kaohsiung	Daoshu+Gunshu
World Championships
Gold medal – first place	2003 Macau	Changquan
Gold medal – first place	2003 Macau	Duilian
Gold medal – first place	2007 Beijing	Daoshu
Asian Championships
Gold medal – first place	2008 Macau	Gunshu
East Asian Games
Gold medal – first place	2005 Macau	Daoshu+Gunshu

Zhao Qingjian (Chinese: 赵庆建; pinyin: Zhàoqìngjiàn; born March 15, 1978) is a retired professional wushu taolu athlete who is originally from Shandong. Through his numerous successes in national and international competitions, he established himself as one of the greatest wushu taolu athletes of the 2000s.

== Career ==
=== Early career ===
Growing up in Dongping County, Zhao was inspired by the 1982 film Shaolin Temple was a kid and decided to sign up for wushu classes. He was the all-around champion at the Dongping County Tournament. Unable to progress to the provincial team due to his age, Zhao moved south at the age of twelve in 1990 to join the Shanwei municipal team until the age of fifteen.

Returning to Shandong, Zhao was eventually convinced to join the Henan Songshan Shaolin Temple by Xu Dezheng. He was quickly drafted into the performance team which went on tours throughout the United States, Asia, and Europe during the mid-1990s. Upon conclusion of the 1998 American tour, Zhao decided to try to enroll at the Wuhan Sports University. Although never being formally educated, he caught the attention of coach Mei Hanchao in the technical exam and was given a large scholarship to attend the university.

=== Transition to modern wushu ===
In 1999, he was recruited by coach Wu Bin and joined the Beijing Wushu Team. Zhao's first competition representing Beijing was in the 2000 National Taolu Championships where he won a gold medals in changquan and daoshu, and a bronze medal in gunshu, thus becoming the all-around champion. At the 2001 National Games of China, he won the silver medal in the changquan combined event which featured rounds for an optional routine and the IWUF second compulsory routine.

Zhao's international debut was at the 2003 World Wushu Championships where he won gold in the changquan event and in the duilian event with Wei Jian and Yi Peng. He then won gold in the daoshu and gunshu combined event at the 2005 East Asian Games. The same year, he also won a gold medal in changquan and a silver medal in daoshu and gunshu combined at the 2005 National Games of China. After winning gold in daoshu at the 2007 World Wushu Championships, Zhao qualified to compete in the 2008 Beijing Wushu Tournament and won in the daoshu and gunshu combined event by a significant margin. A year later, he won gold in the same combined event at the 2009 World Games. Shortly after, Zhao was able to win in the changquan event at the 2009 National Games of China, narrowly placing above Yuan Xiaochao. Zhao subsequently retired from competition.

=== Post-retirement ===
Today, Zhao hosts seminars on wushu and shaolinquan throughout China, the United States, and other Asian and European countries. In 2006, he was appointed as a wushu teacher at the Capital Institute of Sports Education. Later in 2020, he became director of the Chinese Kung Fu Inheritance Committee by the Cultural China Fund of the China Chinese Education Foundation.

== Competitive history ==
Year	Event	CQ	DS	GS	AA	GRP
2000	National Championships	1st place, gold medalist(s)	1st place, gold medalist(s)	3rd place, bronze medalist(s)	1st place, gold medalist(s)	
2001	National Games	(silver) *	8	5	4	9
2003	World Championships	1st place, gold medalist(s)				1st place, gold medalist(s)
2004	National Championships	2nd place, silver medalist(s)	1st place, gold medalist(s)	8	1st place, gold medalist(s)	
2005	East Asian Games		1	1	1st place, gold medalist(s)	
2005	National Games	1st place, gold medalist(s)	?	?	2nd place, silver medalist(s)	
2007	World Championships		1st place, gold medalist(s)	DNS		
2008	Asian Championships		DNS	1st place, gold medalist(s)		
2008	Olympic Games (unofficial)		1	1	1st place, gold medalist(s)	
2008	World Games		1	1	1st place, gold medalist(s)	
2008	National Games	1st place, gold medalist(s)				

== See also ==
- China national wushu team
