= Jian Zengjiao =

Chinese wushu practitioner

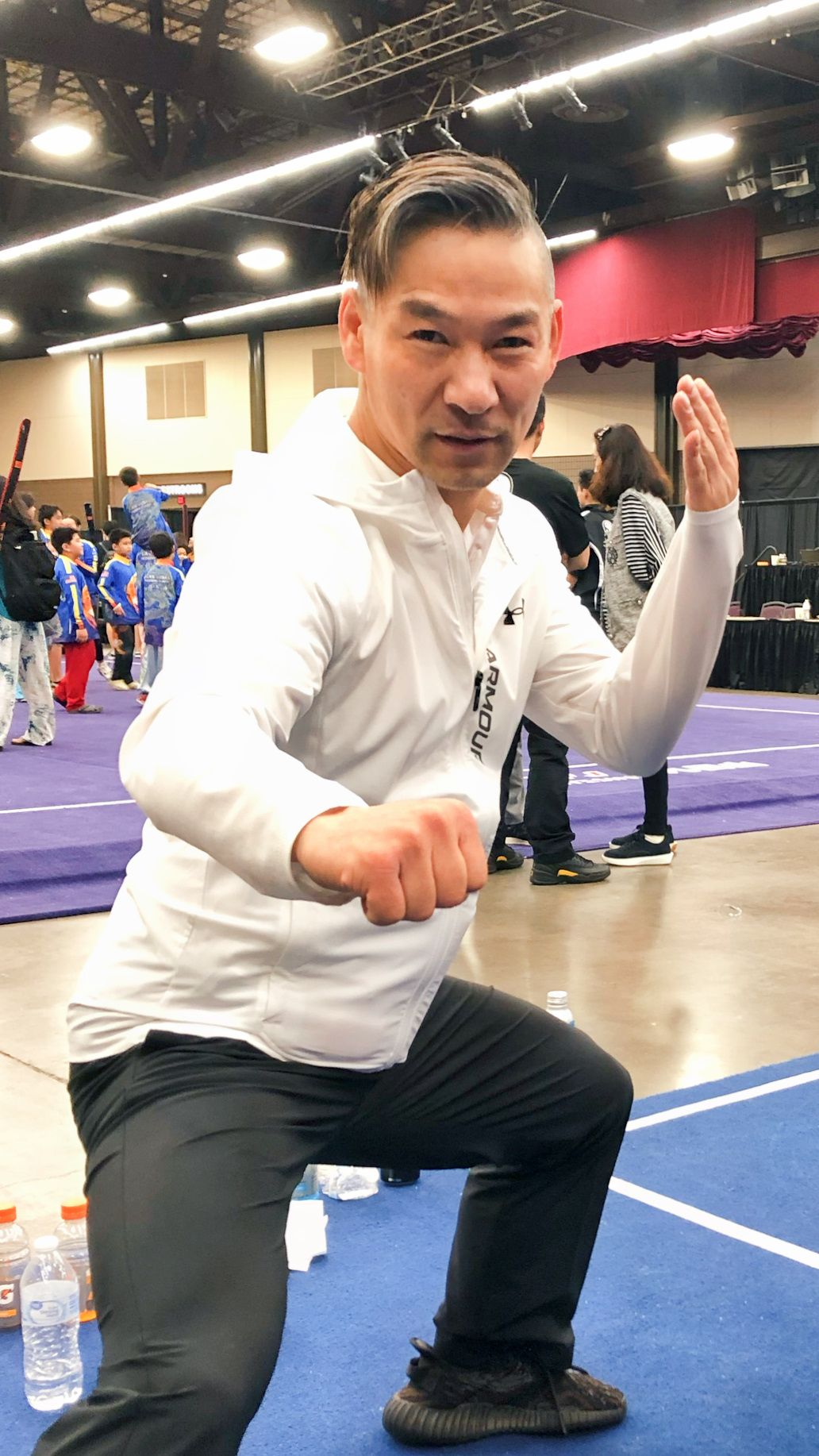
- Jian Zengjiao at the USAWKF Team Trials in 2023 in Lubbock, Texas

Personal information
- Born: 1976 (age 49–50) Gaizhou, Liaoning, China
- Occupations: Martial artist, athlete, stuntman, coach
- Spouse: Altanzul "Zula" Ulambayar

Sport
- Sport: Wushu
- Events: Changquan, Daoshu, Gunshu
- Team: Liaoning Wushu Team (1990-1994); Beijing Wushu Team (1996-2002)
- Coached by: Wu Bin (Beijing)
Medal record
Men's Wushu Taolu
Representing China
World Championships
Gold medal – first place	1999 Hong Kong	Daoshu

Jian Zengjiao (Chinese: 简增蛟; pinyin: Jiǎn Zēngjiāo) is a retired professional wushu taolu athlete originally from Liaoning, China. He is currently a performer in Cirque du Soleil's Kà and is a coach in Las Vegas, United States.

== Career ==
Jian started practicing wushu at the age of six and was selected to become a member of the Liaoning provincial wushu team in 1990. In 1995, he declared his retirement and moved to the United States to work in stunts, with his most notable appearance being in Warriors of Virtue (1997). After two years abroad, he returned to China and upon recommendation by former Liaoning athlete, Liu Qinghua, he joined the Beijing Wushu Team under coach Wu Bin. After winning the national championship title in daoshu, he became the world champion in the same event at the 1999 World Wushu Championships in Hong Kong. Two years later, he won the silver medal at the 2001 National Games of China in men's daoshu and gunshu. He subsequently retired from competitive wushu.

In 2003, Jian along with fellow Beijing team members He Jing De and Li Jing as well as former Hong Kong team member Lo Nga Ching joined Cirque du Soleil's upcoming newest show, Kà. Jian would be the only performer to stay with the show for a prolonged period of time, eventually becoming a coach of the martial arts and stunts team. With Kà, he was a guest performer in The Tonight Show with Jay Leno and in America's Got Talent. In Las Vegas, Jian married Altanzul "Zula" Ulambayar, a fellow performer from Kà. They opened their school, Las Vegas Modern Kung Fu, in 2008.

In 2020, Jian taught for the International Wushu Federation Online Wushu Classroom. He also performed at the opening ceremony of the 2023 World Wushu Championships.
