= Hao Zhihua =

Chinese martial artist

Patti Li 郝致华
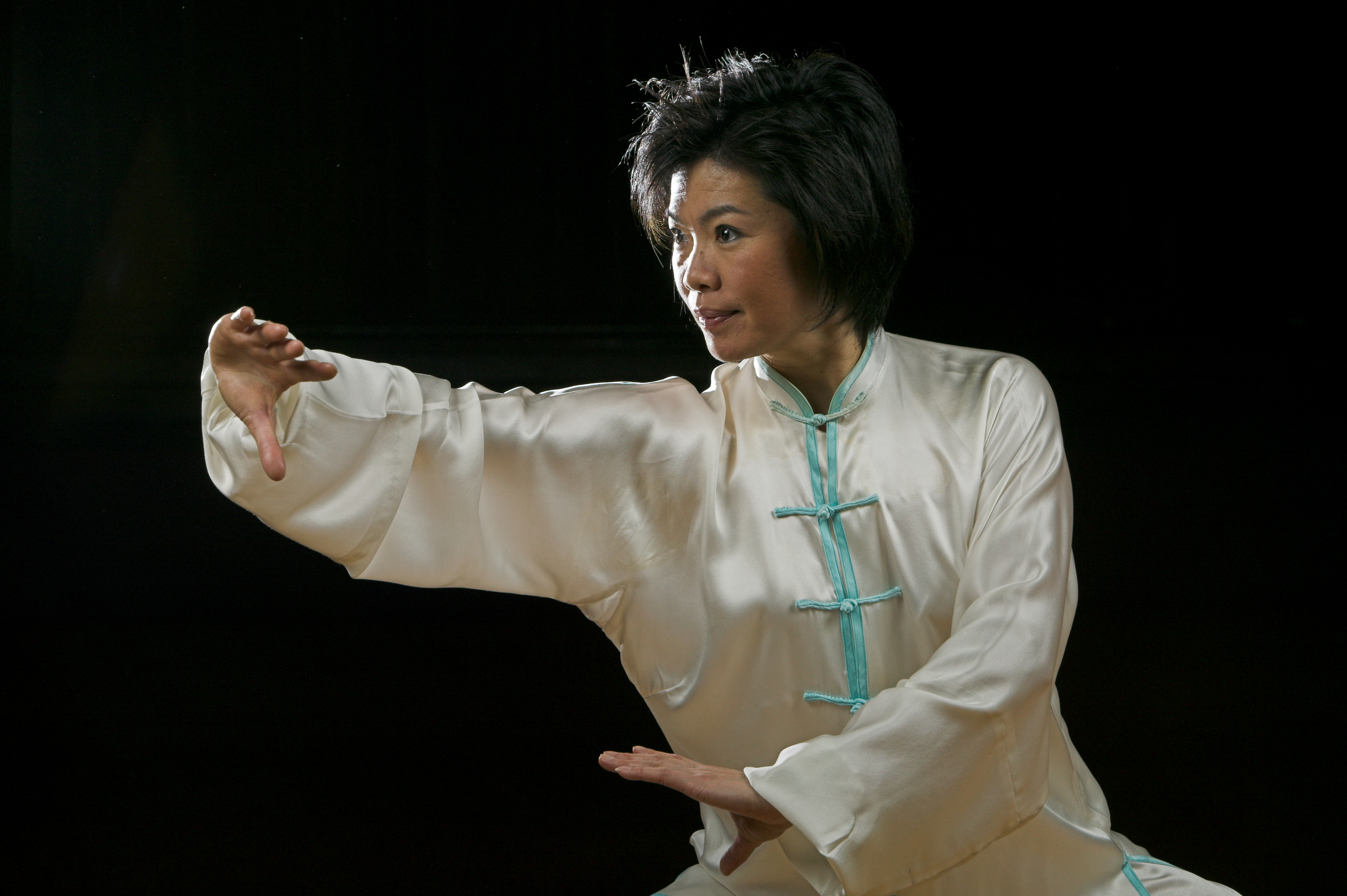
- Style: Changquan, Yang-style and Chen-style tai chi, broadsword, straightsword, staff, spear, Yingzhaoquan, Baguazhang, Shequan, double hook sword, and double broadsword

Hao Zhihua (simplified Chinese: 郝致华; traditional Chinese: 郝致華), also known as Patti Li, is a Chinese wushu practitioner. She started her training at the age of nine at the Beijing Sports Academy under the instruction of Wu Bin, director of the Beijing Institute for Wushu Research and a pioneer of modern wushu in China. For fifteen years she competed in China as a member of the world-renowned Beijing Wushu Team, winning the title of National All-Around Champion three years in a row.

Hao Zhihua is the only person in China's history to have won six gold medals, in addition to one silver medal, in a single national competition. She is also one of only two wushu athletes who have ever received the "Ten Best Athletes in China" award. In total, she accumulated over 80 gold, silver, and bronze medals during her competitive career.

In addition to coach Wu Bin, Hao Zhihua trained under coach Li Junfeng and studied Yang-style tai chi under master Yang Zhen Duo. She is proficient in long fist, Yang-style and Chen-style tai chi, broadsword, straightsword, staff, spear, eagle claw, Baguazhang, snake fist, double hook sword, and double broadsword.

After leaving the Beijing Wushu Team she received a special invitation to attend the Beijing Teacher's College of Physical Education for an intensive degree program in physical education. After graduating she continued to teach at the college for two years before leaving China. She taught abroad before finally settling in Berkeley, California in 1990, where she provides instruction in wushu, tai chi, and bagua in both English and Mandarin Chinese.

Hao Zhihua runs a Wushu and tai chi school in Oakland, California.

== Filmography ==
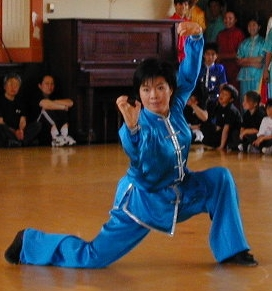
Master Hao Zhihua performing martial arts.

Hao Zhihua appeared in the 1987 video documentary titled This is Kung Fu with fellow Beijing Wushu Team member Jet Li.

In 2012, Aesop Rock featured Hao Zhihua in the music video to his single called ZZZ Top.

== See also ==
- Chinese martial arts
- Beijing Wushu Team
- Wushu (sport)
- Tai chi
