= Wushu at the 2001 National Games of China =

Wushu Taolu at the 2001 National Games of China
- Venue: Shunde Sports Center Gymnasium (capacity: 2,856)
- Location: Shunde, Foshan, Guangdong, China
- Dates: August 21-23, 2001
- Website: Official Website (Archived)

The wushu taolu competition at the 2001 National Games of China was held from August 21-23, 2001 at the Shunde Sports Center Gymnasium (Chinese: 顺德体育中心体育馆) in Shunde, Foshan, Guangdong, China.

== Results ==
=== Medal table ===
Rank	Delegation	Gold	Silver	Bronze	Total
1	Beijing	2	4	2	8
2	Tianjin	2	0	1.5	3.5
3	Shanxi	2	0	0	2
4	Guangdong	1.5	1	1	3.5
5	Hebei	1	1	0	2
6	Guangxi	1	0	1	2
6	Henan	1	0	1	2
8	Hubei	1	0	0	1
9	Sichuan	0.5	1	1	2.5
10	Jilin	0	1	1	2
11	Anhui	0	1	0	1
11	Fujian	0	1	0	1
11	Gansu	0	1	0	1
11	Shanghai	0	1	0	1
15	Ningxia	0	0	2	2
16	Liaoning	0	0	1.5	1.5
Totals (16 entries)		12	12	12	36

=== Medalists ===
==== Men ====
Event	Gold	Silver	Bronze
Changquan (compulsory+optional)	Yuan Xindong; Shanxi	Zhao Qingjian; Beijing	Zhang Xiaopeng; Tianjin
Daoshu+Gunshu	Zhang Xiaopeng; Tianjin	Jian Zengjiao; Beijing	He Jingde; Beijing
Jianshu+Qiangshu	Shi Kun; Beijing	Wen Bing; Gansu	Tan Kang Min; Sichuan
Nanquan+Nangun	Chen Lun; Guangdong	Chen Shuai; Fujian	Tan Ran Cong; Guangxi
Taijiquan+Taijijian	Yi Peng; Hubei	Kong Xiangdong; Guangdong	Zhuang Zhiyong; Ningxia
Duilian	Shanxi; Yuan Xindong; Luo Junwei; Wang Jian Guo	Sichuan; Ding Wei; Tang Kang Min; He Qing Shan	Liaoning; Gao Zhi; He Tengjiao; Li Cheng

==== Women ====
Event	Gold	Silver	Bronze
Changquan (compulsory+optional)	Liu Qinghua; Beijing	Wang Xiaonuo; Beijing	Han Xiaonan; Tianjin/Liaoning
Daoshu+Gunshu	Wang Xiaonan; Hebei	Wang Rui; Jilin	Liu Xueyan; Jilin
Jianshu+Qiangshu	Zhao Yangyang; Henan	Liu Qinghua; Beijing	Jiang Ludi; Henan
Nanquan+Nandao	Huang Chun Ni; Guangxi	Ding Hui Ru; Shanghai	Chen Yan Ping; Guangdong
Taijiquan+Taijijian	Liang Xiao Kui; Guangdong/Sichuan	Fan Xueping; Anhui	Qiu Hui Fang; Beijing
Duilian	Tianjin; Liu Yanyan; Li Xiang; Yu Haoer	Hebei; He Xingnuo; Fu Linuo	Ningxia; Zhang Tengou; Qiu Xiaoying
