= Yu Chenghui =

Yu Chenghui 于承惠
- Born: 16 August 1939; Penglai, Shandong, China
- Died: 4 July 2015 (aged 75); Jinan, Shandong, China
- Occupations: Actor; action director; martial artist
- Years active: 1982–2015

Chinese name
Transcriptions
Standard Mandarin
- Hanyu Pinyin: Yú Chénghuì
Yue: Cantonese
- Jyutping: Jyu4 Sing4-wai6
- Musical career
- Also known as: Yue Sing-wai

Yu Chenghui (16 August 1939 – 4 July 2015), sometimes credited as Yue Sing-wai, was a Chinese actor, action director and martial artist.

== Martial arts career ==
Yu started practising martial arts at the age of 11, specialising in the use of the jian (Chinese sword). He won the championship title at the age of 20 in a wushu competition held in Qingdao. He joined the Shandong wushu team later and emerged as the champion in the zuijian ("Drunken Sword") category in another wushu competition.

Yu once injured his leg during a training session and almost lost the use of his leg due to delayed medical treatment. He left the wushu team later to recover from his injury and worked in a factory for the next decade or so. During that period of time, Yu spent his free time studying martial arts and interacting with other martial artists to improve his techniques until he had fully recovered.

For 14 years during the course of his martial arts career, Yu had been working on recreating the shuang shou jian (double-handed sword) movement, which was believed to be extinct since the Tang dynasty. In the wee hours of the morning of 15 September 1975, during a thunderstorm, Yu saw how a praying mantis reacted in response to the heavy downpour and conceived the ideas for completing the design of the swordplay technique. The shuang shou jian is now officially recognised as a category in wushu competitions.

== Film and television career ==
Yu was discovered by film director Chang Hsin-yen of Great Wall Pictures, who cast him as the villain "Wang Renze" in the 1982 film Shaolin Temple, which starred Jet Li as the protagonist. Following his first successful role in Chinese cinema, Yu continued to star in other martial arts films such as Kids From Shaolin (1984) and Martial Arts of Shaolin (1986).

In 1993, Yu served as the action director for the film Donggui Yingxiong Zhuan and was awarded the "Star of Martial Arts" kudos by the Chinese Wushu Association in 1998 for his unique achievements in his martial arts choreography on screen.

In the 2000s, Yu turned his attention to wuxia-themed television series. Between 2001 and 2009, Yu worked with television series producer Zhang Jizhong on a number of projects, mostly in adaptations of Louis Cha's wuxia novels. He also portrayed Ip Man in the 2008 television series The Legend of Bruce Lee.

Yu stated in a 2005 newspaper interview that he never shaved his trademark beard, even at the request of movie producers, because he wanted to portray Zhou Tong, a famous Song dynasty military tutor, in a future film. He went on to say "He is an outstandingly able person from the Northern and Southern Song dynasties and many Water Margin heroes are his disciples. This person is very important in martial arts and many people want to portray him in films."^{[j]} He died at the age of 75 in 2015.

== Filmography ==
=== Film ===
Year	Title	Role	Notes
1982	Shaolin Temple 少林寺	Wang Renze	
1984	Kids From Shaolin 少林小子	Pao Feng	
1986	Martial Arts of Shaolin 南北少林	He Sao	
1988	Yellow River Fighter 黃河大俠	Ma Yi	
1993	Donggui Yingxiong Zhuan 東歸英雄傳		Action director, screenwriter
2006	A Battle of Wits 墨攻	Dongbo	
2012	Judge Archer 箭士柳白猿		
2014	Snow Blossom 大寒桃花开		filmed in 2004
2014	The Four III		

=== Television ===
Year	Title	Role	Notes
2001	Laughing in the Wind 笑傲江湖	Feng Qingyang	
2002	Shaolin King of Martial Arts 少林武王	Tong Dabao	
2003	Lian Cheng Jue 連城訣	Mei Niansheng	
2005	Trail of the Everlasting Hero 俠影仙蹤	Taoist Chisong	
2006	The Return of the Condor Heroes 神鵰俠侶	Huang Yaoshi	
2006	Seven Swordsmen 七劍下天山	Fu Qingzhu	
2007	Sword Stained with Royal Blood 碧血劍	Mu Renqing	
2007	The Legend of Shaolin Temple 少林寺傳奇	Bandit leader	
2008	Royal Tramp 鹿鼎記	Feng Xifan	
2008	The Legend of Bruce Lee 李小龍傳奇	Ip Man	
2009	The Heaven Sword and Dragon Saber 倚天屠龍記	Zhang Sanfeng	
2011	Journey to the West 西遊記	Subhuti	
