= Yuan Xindong =

Chinese wushu practitioner (born 1997)

Personal information
- Born: 1997 (age 28–29) Shanxi, China
- Occupations: Athlete, martial artist, coach

Sport
- Sport: Wushu
- Events: Changquan, Daoshu, Gunshu
- Team: Shanxi Wushu Team (1990-2002)
- Coached by: Pang Lintai
Medal record
Representing China
Men's Wushu Taolu
World Championships
Gold medal – first place	2001 Yerevan	Gunshu (new)
Asian Games
Gold medal – first place	2002 Busan	CQ All-Around
East Asian Games
Gold medal – first place	2001 Osaka	Changquan

Yuan Xindong (Chinese: 袁新东; pinyin: Yuánxīndōng) is a retired professional wushu taolu athlete from Shanxi, China.

== Career ==
After slowly rising in China national competition, Yuan made his international debut at the 2001 East Asian Games where he won the gold medal in men's changquan. A few months later, he was a gold medalist in changquan combined (compulsory and optional) and duilian at the 2001 National Games of China. Shortly after, he became the world champion in gunshu at the 2001 World Wushu Championships. The following year, he competed in the 2002 Asian Games and won the gold medal in men's changquan all-around. He subsequently retired from competitive wushu and became a coach of the Shanxi Wushu Team.

== Personal life ==
Yuan Xindong is a cousin of Yuan Wenqing and uncle of Yuan Xiaochao. Yuan Xindong coached his nephew Yuan Xiaochao to gold medal victories at the 2009 World Games and 2010 Asian Games.

== See also ==
- List of Asian Games medalists in wushu
