= He Jingde =

Chinese wushu practitioner

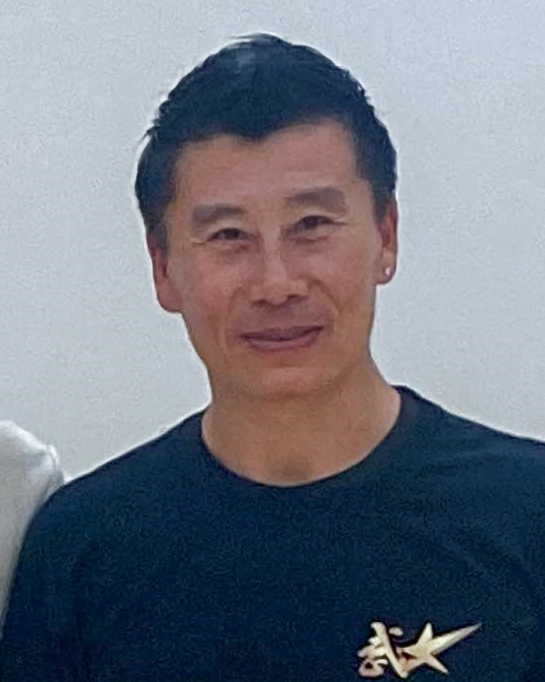
- He Jingde at UCLA in 2023

Personal information
- Born: 23 April 1978 (age 48) Shandong, China
- Education: Beijing Sports University
- Occupations: Athlete, martial artist, stuntman, coach
- Spouse: Lo Nga Ching

Sport
- Sport: Wushu
- Events: Nanquan, Nangun, Nandao, Daoshu, Gunshu, Shuangdao
- Team: Beijing Wushu Team (1994-2002); Hong Kong Wushu Team (2006-2011)
- Coached by: Wu Bin (Beijing)
Medal record
Representing Hong Kong
Men's Wushu Taolu
World Combat Games
Silver medal – second place	2010 Beijing	Nanquan+Nangun
World Championships
Gold medal – first place	2009 Toronto	Nangun
Gold medal – first place	2011 Ankara	Nangun
Silver medal – second place	2009 Toronto	Nanquan
Silver medal – second place	2011 Ankara	Nanquan
Silver medal – second place	2011 Ankara	Nandao
Bronze medal – third place	2009 Toronto	Nandao
Asian Games
Silver medal – second place	2010 Guangzhou	Nanquan+Nangun
Asian Championships
Silver medal – second place	2008 Macau	Nangun
Bronze medal – third place	2008 Macau	Nandao
East Asian Games
Gold medal – first place	2009 Hong Kong	Nanquan+Nangun

He Jingde (Chinese: 賀敬德; pinyin: Hè Jìngdé; born April 23, 1978) is a former competitive wushu taolu athlete and stuntman originally from China. He was a member of the Beijing Wushu Team, an original member of Cirque du Soleil's KA, and a renowned athlete representing Hong Kong. He is a two-time world champion and medalist at the Asian Games and the East Asian Games, and is especially remembered for his unique wushu style.

== Career ==
In 1994, He was recruited by Wu Bin to join the Beijing Wushu Team. He achieved success in various disciplines including a bronze medal victory in shuangdao at the 1997 National Games of China. After this major competition, the Beijing Wushu Team went on various international tours, and He had the chance to perform and compete internationally. After winning the bronze medal in the men's daoshu and gunshu combined event at the 2001 National Games of China, he retired from competitive wushu.

In 2003, He along with his wife Lo Nga Ching moved to Canada, then to the United States to become members of Cirque du Soleil's Kà. He was joined by fellow retired Beijing Wushu Team members Li Jing and Jian Zengjiao. He also would spend time teaching wushu in Los Angeles and working as a fight choreographer.

In 2005, He moved to Hong Kong and became a member of the Hong Kong wushu team. His first major international appearance was at the 2006 Asian Games in Doha, Qatar where he lost the bronze medal position by 0.05 in men's nanquan. After not seeing success in the 2007 World Wushu Championships in Beijing, China, he appeared at the 2009 World Wushu Championships in Toronto, Canada and became a world champion in nangun in addition to winning two more medals. Shortly after, He won the gold medal in men's nanquan at the 2009 East Asian Games in Hong Kong. The following year, he was the silver medalist in men's nanquan at the 2010 World Combat Games in Beijing, China. Later that year, he won the silver medal in men's nanquan at the 2010 Asian Games in Guangzhou, China. As his last competition, he competed in the 2011 World Wushu Championships in Ankara, Turkey, and was once again a world champion in nangun as well as a double silver medalist in nanquan and nandao.

== Competitive history ==
Year	Event	NQ	ND	NG	AA
2006	Asian Games	5	2	2	4
2007	World Championships	5	12	14	9
2008	Asian Championships	?	3rd place, bronze medalist(s)	2nd place, silver medalist(s)	
2009	East Asian Games	?		?	1st place, gold medalist(s)
2009	World Championships	2nd place, silver medalist(s)	3rd place, bronze medalist(s)	1st place, gold medalist(s)	
2010	World Combat Games	?		?	2nd place, silver medalist(s)
2010	Asian Games	3		2	2nd place, silver medalist(s)
2011	World Championships	2nd place, silver medalist(s)	2nd place, silver medalist(s)	1st place, gold medalist(s)	

== Personal life ==
He is married to Lo Nga Ching, a two-time world champion and double silver medalist at the East Asian Games. They have two kids and teach wushu in Hong Kong. One of their children, Jada He, is a two time gold medalist at the World Junior Wushu Championships.

== Awards ==
- Chief Executive's Commendation for Community Service: 2011
- Outstanding Athlete of Hong Kong: 2012

== See also ==
- List of Asian Games medalists in wushu
