= One Foundation =

Chinese non-governmental organization

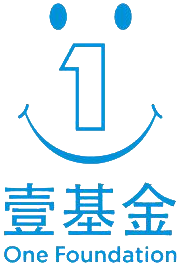
- Logo of One Foundation
- Founded: April 19, 2007
- Founder: Jet Li
- Purpose: disaster relief, children's welfare, professional training
- Location: Shenzhen
- Region served: China
- Method: Funding
- Endowment: ¥50,000,000 RMB (December 3, 2010)
- Volunteers: more than 230
- Website: www.onefoundation.cn

The One Foundation (Chinese: 壹基金), formally known as the Shenzhen One Foundation Charity Fund (Chinese: 深圳壹基金公益基金会), is a Chinese non-governmental organization which focuses on disaster relief, children's welfare, training of public welfare professionals, and funding grassroots charities. It was registered in 2011 as the first private charitable fundraising organization in China. Its headquarters is in Shenzhen, with offices in Beijing and Shanghai. The foundation's motto is "Charity by All, Doing What I Can" (Chinese: 尽我所能，人人公益).

As of April 2013, the board of directors consisted of 11 members, in alphabetical order: Feng Lun (Chinese: 冯仑), Jet Li (Chinese: 李连杰), Liu Chuanzhi (Chinese: 柳传志), Pony Ma (Chinese: 马化腾), Ma Weihua (Chinese: 马蔚华), Jack Ma (Chinese: 马云), Niu Gensheng (Chinese: 牛根生), Wang Shi (Chinese: 王石), Yang Peng (Chinese: 杨鹏), Zhou Qiren (Chinese: 周其仁) and Zhou Weiyan (Chinese: 周惟彦).

== History ==
=== Origin ===
The One Foundation was founded by Chinese Red Cross ambassador Jet Li on April 19, 2007, as the Red Cross Society of China Jet Li One Foundation Project (Chinese: 中国红十字会李连杰壹基金计划) which operated under the Red Cross Society of China. Li stopped his film work throughout 2008 to devote all of his time to developing the foundation. In a Newsweek article, Li cited his personal experience with the 2004 Indian Ocean earthquake and tsunami as a source of inspiration for starting the foundation. At the time, Li, his wife, and two of youngest daughters were vacationing in the Maldives when the tsunami struck. His 1-year-old youngest daughter and her nanny were briefly swept away before being rescued by bystanders.

In October 2008, the One Foundation registered in Shanghai as a private equity fund under the name Shanghai Jet Li One Foundation Charity Fund (Chinese: 上海李连杰壹基金公益基金会). Through pilot regulations on public fundraising enacted in the Shenzhen special economic zone, the One Foundation was able to register as an independent public fundraising foundation on December 3, 2010, thus ending its affiliation with the government-run Chinese Red Cross and becoming the first Chinese NGO not affiliated with the government or a government-sponsored organization. Commentators regarded this development as a "breakthrough" in the development of Chinese NGOs. Institutional funding for the Shenzhen-based organization came from the Shanghai Jet Li One Foundation Charity Fund, Lao Niu Foundation (Chinese: 老牛基金会), Tencent Charitable Foundation (Chinese: 腾讯公益慈善基金会), Vantone Foundation (Chinese: 万通公益基金会) and Vanke Foundation (Chinese: 万科公益基金会). Each founding organization donated 10 million RMB for a total of 50 million RMB start-up capital.

=== Chinese Red Cross Affiliation ===
Before its establishment in Shenzhen as an independent foundation, the One Foundation was an affiliate of the Chinese Red Cross, with its funds managed by the latter. Li cited the lack of independence as a motivating factor for the One Foundation to end its cooperation with the Chinese Red Cross in 2010.

Following the Chinese Red Cross' Guo Meimei scandal in 2011, the One Foundation tried to distance itself from its former connection with the organization. After the 2013 Lushan earthquake, web users in China discovered that the English section of the One Foundation website still claimed there was a direct link to the Red Cross, and that donations to One Foundation would be "deposited directly into an account held by the Red Cross Society of China, earmarked for use by the One Foundation." One Foundation promptly took down the English site and issued a statement that the information was outdated, representing the situation before December 3, 2010, and that only information on the site in Chinese should be considered correct. Director of Operations Rob Hemsley successfully took charge of limiting fallout from the Guo Meimei connection.

== Volunteers ==
Volunteers for the foundation pledge themselves to donating a set amount each year and/or committing one hour of their time each month to the community through their line of work or other form of volunteer work.

Volunteers are classified into four groups: Academic, Individual, Student, and Organizational.

Notable volunteers include Yao Ming, Andy Lau, Michelle Yeoh, Kang Xiaoguang, Jack Ma, Xu Yongguang, Zhuang Ailing, Li Bingbing, and students of Beijing Normal University.

== Donations ==
The One Foundation promotes donations under the slogan "1 person + 1 dollar + 1 month = 1 big family," with the goal of pooling together individual donations to encourage participation in philanthropy and charity, particularly in China and Asia.
