= Wushu at the 2006 Asian Games – Men's nanquan combined =

Men's nanquan combined at the 2006 Asian Games
- Venue: Aspire Hall 3
- Dates: 11–14 December 2006
- Competitors: 20 from 16 nations

Medalists
gold medal	Wu Caibao	China
silver medal	Phạm Quốc Khánh	Vietnam
bronze medal	Lee Seung-kuen	South Korea

The men's nanquan three events combined competition (Nanquan, Nandao and Nangun) at the 2006 Asian Games in Doha, Qatar was held from 11 to 14 December at the Aspire Hall 3.

== Schedule ==
All times are Arabia Standard Time (UTC+03:00)

Date	Time	Event
Monday, 11 December 2006	14:00	Nanquan
Wednesday, 13 December 2006	10:00	Nandao
Thursday, 14 December 2006	10:00	Nangun

== Results ==
Legend

- DNS — Did not start

Rank	Athlete	Nanquan	Nandao	Nangun	Total
1st place, gold medalist(s)	Wu Caibao (CHN)	9.82	9.80	9.85	29.47
2nd place, silver medalist(s)	Phạm Quốc Khánh (VIE)	9.74	9.60	9.73	29.07
3rd place, bronze medalist(s)	Lee Seung-kuen (KOR)	9.70	9.65	9.70	29.05
4	He Jingde (HKG)	9.60	9.67	9.73	29.00
5	Heryanto (INA)	9.63	9.58	9.61	28.82
6	Peng Wei-chua (TPE)	9.49	9.54	9.69	28.72
7	Willy Wang (PHI)	9.39	9.62	9.62	28.63
8	Leong Hong Man (MAC)	9.47	9.53	9.59	28.59
9	Pedro Quina (PHI)	9.39	9.45	9.66	28.50
10	Pui Fook Chien (MAS)	9.23	9.58	9.67	28.48
11	Farshad Arabi (IRI)	9.30	9.42	9.61	28.33
12	Sandry Liong (INA)	9.27	9.40	9.65	28.32
13	Ma Meng-chun (TPE)	9.28	9.51	9.47	28.26
14	Bassam Al-Sabri (YEM)	8.02	8.65	9.07	25.74
15	Prabhath Mudiyanselage (SRI)	7.28	8.70	8.80	24.78
16	Rustam Eshenkulov (KGZ)	7.79	8.10	8.62	24.51
17	Gautam Dangol (NEP)	7.20	8.27	8.62	24.09
18	Haroutioun Vatarian (LIB)	7.20	8.06	8.10	23.36
19	Oleg Kirilov (KGZ)	7.47	0.00	8.36	15.83
20	Somorjit Sagolsem (IND)	DNS	DNS	DNS	0.00
