= Martial Arts of Shaolin =

1986 Hong Kong-Chinese film by Lau Kar-leung

- Original Hong Kong film poster
- Traditional Chinese: 南北少林
- Simplified Chinese: 南北少林
- Hanyu Pinyin: Nánběi Shàolín
- Jyutping: Naam4 Bak1 Siu3 Lam4
- Directed by: Lau Kar-leung
- Written by: Si Yeung-ping
- Produced by: Fu Qi
- Starring: Jet Li; Huang Qiuyan; Hu Jianqiang; Yu Chenghui; Yu Hai
- Cinematography: Tsao An-sung
- Edited by: Chiu Yan-tat; Chiu Po-lin
- Music by: James Wong; Romeo Diaz; Law Tik
- Production companies: Shaw Brothers Studio; Pearl River Film
- Distributed by: Shaw Brothers Studio
- Release date: 1 February 1986
- Running time: 94 minutes
- Countries: Hong Kong; China
- Languages: Mandarin; Cantonese
- Box office: HK$18.1 million (Hong Kong); 116.2 million tickets (China & South Korea)

Martial Arts of Shaolin (Chinese: 南北少林, lit. "Southern and Northern Shaolin"), also known as Shaolin Temple 3: Martial Arts of Shaolin, is a 1986 action comedy-themed martial arts film. A Hong Kong-Chinese co-production, the film is notable for being the only collaboration between film director Lau Kar-leung and actor Jet Li. It was later released on Region 1 DVD by The Weinstein Company under the Dragon Dynasty imprint.

In the film, an orphaned boy is trained as both a monk and a fighter Northern Shaolin school. He eventually seizes an opportunity to seek revenge against the man who killed his family, choosing to infiltrate his enemy's birthday celebration. Meanwhile, a female martial artist orchestrates an assassination attempt at the same birthday celebration.

== Plot ==
During China's Qing dynasty, Lin Zhi-Ming, a young man who was orphaned as a boy, is raised as a monk by the Northern Shaolin school. A silver ankle bracelet is the only reminder of his past life. Zhi-Ming continues to wear it in secrecy from the temple's elders. Despite being a devout student of Shaolin, Zhi-ming tends to break many of the monastery's rules, such as sneaking in meat to temple grounds or teaching the school's secrets to outsiders. Zhi-Ming regularly meets some of the local youth and unofficially accepts them as his disciples; two of the youths are chosen to perform Lion dancing at the birthday of the magistrate He Suo, who was responsible for the deaths of Zhi-ming's family. To get his revenge, Zhi-ming persuades the youth to let him perform instead.

Meanwhile, in Southern China, Si-ma Yan, the niece of the Southern Shaolin school's master Fa Ren, learns about the birthday celebrations at the capital and decides to avenge her family's death by assassinating He Suo. Fa Ren soon discovers Si-ma Yan's disappearance and enlists disciple Chao Wei, a close friend of Si-ma Yan, to aid her during her mission.

During the festivities, Zhi-Ming tries to perform his Lion dance while planning to stab He Suo, but is interrupted by Si-ma Yan and her compatriots, who attempt to assassinate He Suo with hidden bows during a performance. He Suo dodges the arrows, and a fight ensues. Chao Wei and a wounded Si-ma Yan reluctantly agree to work with Zhi-Ming to escape He Suo's henchmen. Meanwhile, He Suo blocks all roads leading to the South, where Si-ma Yan and Chao Wei hope to escape back to Southern Shaolin. The trio eventually bypass checkpoints set up by He Suo's men, but after spending a night to rest, Si-ma Yan reveals to Zhi-Ming a silver ankle band. She was told that someone else has the same band; if the band was given to a girl, they would be sisters, but if given to a boy, she was to be arranged to marriage to him. Zhi-ming does not reveal his band, as the trio are discovered by Zhi-ming's master, Shi Ren, who has searched for Zhi-Ming for deserting Northern Shaolin. Chao Wei and Si-ma Yan agree to flee, but Zhi-ming is brought before the abbot of Northern Shaolin to face punishment. He is sentenced to three years in solitary confinement along with another Shaolin Monk facing nine years. After telling the monk about Si-ma Yan, Zhi-Ming is suggested to leave the temple and adopt a secular life. However, Shaolin is all Zhi-Ming grew up with, and he does not wish to leave it behind. Zhi-Ming starts wishing to briefly leave Shaolin to speak to her. The monk decides to help Zhi-Ming by letting him escape under the condition that he returns to face the rest of his punishment.

After reaching Southern Shaolin, Zhi-ming reveals to Chao Wei that he has the same band as Si-ma Yan. However, before the two can find her, Si-ma Yan has already left the temple with her uncle to prevent the Southern school from being endangered by He Suo. After escaping Master Shi Ren again, who arrived for an escort mission from the Abbot, Zhi-Ming and Chao Wei reach the main road, only to discover Fa Ren mortally wounded and revealing that Si-ma Yan was captured by He Suo and taken by boat. Meanwhile, He Suo plans to lure both Zhi-ming and Chao Wei to personally kill them with Si-ma Yan. After discovering He Suo's boat, Zhi-ming and Chao Wei blockade the river and fight He Suo's henchmen, before both Northern and Southern Shaolin temples arrive to assist in Si-ma Yan's rescue. After the henchmen have been disposed, He Suo is overpowered by Zhi-ming and his companions and is later killed by Si-ma Yan.

With their mission complete, Zhi-ming gives the ankle band to Chao Wei. Although he opposes at first, Chao Wei but eventually claims that it belongs to him in front of Si-ma Yan. Zhi-ming expresses his well wishes for them before departing with the monks back to Northern Shaolin.

== Production ==
The film is the third part of the successful Shaolin film series which began with the 1982 film, Shaolin Temple, and was followed by Kids From Shaolin (1984). However, although it stars many Mainland actors from either or both predecessor films (Jet Li, Yu Chenghui, Yu Hai, Hu Jianqiang and Huang Qiuyan), Martial Arts Of Shaolin uses a Hong Kong production crew from Shaw Brothers Studio, in contrast to the other two films (which are Hong Kong-funded but are shot by a Mainland-born Hong Kong director with a Mainland crew).

== Cast ==
- Jet Li as Lin Zhi-ming
- Huang Qiuyan as Si-ma Yan
- Hu Jianqiang as Chao Wei
- Yu Chenghui as Lord He Suo
- Yu Hai as Master Shi Ren
- Sun Jian-kui as Lord He's bodyguard
- Lau Wai-leung as Lord He's bodyguard
- Ji Chunhua as Lord He's bodyguard
- Mak Wai-cheung as Wei Fang
- Yan Di-hua as Master Wu Lou
- Zhang Jian-wen as Head Abbot
- Hung Yan-yan as Shaolin student

== Box office ==
In Hong Kong, the film grossed HK$18,106,589, making it the sixth top-grossing film of the year. It performed moderately well at the Hong Kong box office.

In China, it became the highest-grossing film of 1987, selling 116 million tickets in the country. In South Korea, the film sold 164,230 tickets in the capital city of Seoul, adding up to 116,164,230 tickets sold in China and South Korea.

== Accolades ==
Accolades
Ceremony	Category	Recipient	Outcome
6th Hong Kong Film Awards	Best Action Choreography	The Liu Clan	Nominated
