= Shaolin King of Martial Arts =

2002 Chinese TV series

- DVD cover art
- 少林武王
- Genre: Wuxia
- Screenplay by: Li Changfu
- Directed by: Chang Hsin-yen; Liu Jiacheng; Wu Chia-tai
- Presented by: Ma Zhongjun
- Starring: Wu Jing; Yaqi; Chunyu Shanshan; Gao Haiyan; Huang Yi; Yu Chenghui; Ji Chunhua; Yu Hai; Xu Xiangdong
- Country of origin: China
- Original language: Mandarin
- No. of episodes: 22

Production
- Executive producers: Huzi; Huang Chenglian; Wang Renhai; Zhang Yi
- Producers: Tang Songtao; Fan Xiaotian; Tie Fo; Zhou Penggang; Yao Jia; Pan Zhongshi; Lou Xiaoxi
- Production location: China
- Running time: ≈45 minutes per episode
- Production companies: Shanghai Cable TV; Henan TV; Xi'an TV; Beijing Chaoyong Dongfang Film Culture

Shaolin King of Martial Arts (少林武王) is a 2002 Chinese wuxia television series directed by Chang Hsin-yen, Liu Jiacheng and Wu Chia-tai. It starred Wu Jing, Yaqi, Chunyu Shanshan, Gao Haiyan, Huang Yi, Yu Chenghui, Ji Chunhua, Yu Hai and Xu Xiangdong in the leading roles.

== Synopsis ==
The story is set in China during the Ming dynasty when corrupt officials dominate the government and the aggressive wokou constantly raid the coastal regions. Qi Jiguang and his cousin Qi Jiyu organise a local militia to resist the wokou and defeat them.

Oshima Masao, the wokou chief, bribes the eunuch Tong Dabao, a close aide of the incompetent emperor, to spread slanderous rumours about the militia to make the emperor disband the militia. Qi Jiyu and his son Qi Shaozheng discover evidence of Tong's treachery and attempt to report Tong to the emperor, but Tong finds out, destroys the evidence, and arrests Qi Jiyu. Qi Shaozheng manages to escape.

Tong orders the execution of Qi Jiyu and his family, and places a huge bounty on Qi Shaozheng's head. Qi Shaozheng flees to Shaolin Monastery, where he is taken in by the abbot, renamed "Tanzhi", and trained in martial arts. Tong sends the jinyiwei to Shaolin to arrest Tanzhi, but the Shaolin monks refuse to hand him over, so the jinyiwei burn down the monastery. Tanzhi escapes with Sanjiao, a Shaolin monk, and makes his way to the Southern Shaolin Monastery.

Along the way, Tanzhi and Sanjiao encounter numerous dangers. At one point, Tanzhi is injured but saved by Xiaoni, whose grandfather attempts to force Tanzhi to marry her. Her grandfather, who turns out to be a veteran in the militia, lets Tanzhi go after learning that Tanzhi is Qi Jiyu's son. Tanzhi and Sanjiao later join an opera troupe by accident and Tanzhi falls in love with two maidens. They leave after fending off Tong's henchmen, and eventually arrive at their destination. In Southern Shaolin, Tanzhi trains hard in martial arts to fulfil his quest to seek justice for his family. With his allies' support, he rebuilds the militia and leads them to drive away the wokou. Later, he uses his newly mastered skills to defeat and kill Tong.

== Cast ==
- Wu Jing as Tanzhi / Qi Shaozheng
- Yaqi as Xiaoni
- Chunyu Shanshan as Sanjiao
- Gao Haiyan as Fajing
- Huang Yi as Ounü
- Yu Chenghui as Tong Dabao
- Ji Chunhua as Tanfei
- Yu Hai as Shantong
- Xu Xiangdong as Yuanzhao
- Xu Huanshan as Xiaoni's grandfather
- Wang Yu as Zhiyi
- Tan Qiao as Fayan
- Xiao Yuewen as Faling
- Sui Shuyang as Faneng
- Chen Jianfeng as Faming
- Yang Fan as Oshima Masao
- Wu Yijiang as Dahan
- Tian Haiyan as Baihe
- Kexin as Honglian
- Jin Demao as Yu Fei
- Ding Xiaowa as Lihua
- Shu Yan as Axiang
- Lin Jie as Meihua
- Zhao Lianfen as Juhua
- Shi Xiaohu as Wufan
- Hao Yuan as Ruolan
- Liu Fang as Amu
- Zhang Hao as Gui Silang
- Lü Qiang as Badachui
- Huang Haibing as the Emperor
