= Shaolin (film) =

2011 Hong Kong-Chinese film by Benny Chan

- Hong Kong film poster
- 新少林寺
- Directed by: Benny Chan
- Screenplay by: Charcoal Tan; Cheung Chi-kwong; Chan Kam-cheong; Wang Qiuyu
- Story by: Alan Yuen
- Produced by: Benny Chan; Albert Lee
- Starring: Andy Lau; Nicholas Tse; Jackie Chan; Fan Bingbing; Wu Jing; Xing Yu; Yu Shaoqun
- Cinematography: Anthony Pun
- Edited by: Yau Chi-wai
- Music by: Nicolas Errèra; Anthony Chue
- Production companies: Emperor Motion Pictures; China Film Group; Huayi Brothers Media Corporation; Beijing Silver Moon Productions; China Songshan Shaolin Temple Culture Communication Center
- Distributed by: Emperor Motion Pictures
- Release dates: 19 January 2011 (China); 27 January 2011 (Hong Kong)
- Running time: 131 minutes
- Countries: Hong Kong; China
- Languages: Mandarin; Cantonese
- Box office: US$33,470,508 (China); US$2,632,485 (Hong Kong)

Shaolin (Chinese: 新少林寺), also known as Xin shao lin si ("New Shaolin Temple"), is a 2011 Hong Kong–Chinese martial arts film directed by Benny Chan, starring Andy Lau, Nicholas Tse, Jackie Chan, Fan Bingbing, Wu Jing, Yu Shaoqun and Xing Yu. Set in early 20th-century China, the film is about a ruthless warlord who seeks refuge and redemption at Shaolin Temple after his second-in-command betrays him. Shaolin was also released in both Mandarin and Cantonese and was a commercial success. It is a loose remake of the 1982 film Shaolin Temple, which starred Jet Li, but in a different historical setting.

== Plot ==
During the nation's early years, powers compete to conquer China, each furthering their own military reach and empire. Warlords big and small side with foreigners at the expense of the people. Endless battles turn the land into hell on earth.

— Opening caption

In early 20th-century, during the warlord era of early Republican China, the ruthless Hou Jie defeats his rival Huo Long and seizes control of Dengfeng, Henan, forcing Huo Long to seek shelter in Shaolin Temple. Hou Jie follows, and tricks Huo Long into giving up his treasure map before shooting Huo Long dead. Hou Jie ridicules the Shaolin monks before leaving.

Feeling that his sworn brother, Song Hu, will overthrow him, taking his gold, Hou sets a trap to kill Song in a restaurant during his daughter Shengnan's engagement to Song's son, Wanshan. During dinner, Song retires, ceding everything to Hou, but feeling used, Hou's deputy Cao Man, ambitiously betrays his superior, tipping-off Song about Hou's intentions. In rage and embarrassment, Hou fatally wounds Song, and Cao's assassins attack both families. Despite being shot by Hou, Song saves him before dying. Fleeing, Shengnan is separated from Hou's wife Yan Xi, who is rescued by Shaolin monks who were stealing rice from the military granary to help refugees living at the temple. Hou escapes with Shengnan, who is severely injured after they fall off a cliff. In desperation, Hou brings Shengnan to the Shaolin temple, begging the monks to save her life, but their efforts are in vain, and she dies of her injuries. Yan Xi blames Hou for Shengnan's death and leaves him. In anger, Hou attacks the monks, who quickly subdued him.

In shock at having lost everything overnight, Hou wanders the Shaolin grounds and falls into a pit, meeting their cook Wudao, who provides him food and shelter. Feeling guilty for his misdeeds, Hou petitions the Shaolin abbot to become a monk and atone for his sins. He gradually reforms, learning Shaolin's principles through study and martial arts, and finds peace. Hou is eventually forced to confront his past after learning that Cao has been recruiting male refugees to unearth relics under the pretext of building a railway for foreigners led by the arms dealer Peter. Hou discovers Cao intends to kill the workers to silence them once their job is done. Hou confronts guards burying recent victims, and brings their corpses to the temple, where refugees identify their missing loved ones.

Hearing Hou is still alive, Cao leads his soldiers to the temple to capture him. Hou volunteers to go with Cao to distract him while monks break into Cao's base to save the imprisoned laborers. Hou is reunited with Yan Xi and manages to escape with her. Hou's senior monk, Jingneng, is brutally killed by Cao while covering their escape. Monks decide to flee from the Shaolin temple to avoid further trouble. Wudao leads refugees away while Hou and several monks remain to defend the temple, buying time. Cao arrives with his troops and attacks Shaolin. Meanwhile, Peter, having been denied his ill-gotten artifacts, determines to silence Cao and the entire Shaolin community. He orders artillery bombardment, killing many monks and Cao's soldiers. Hou defeats Cao in battle, but eventually sacrifices himself to save Cao from being crushed by a falling beam. He falls into the Buddha statue's palm and dies peacefully, leaving Cao wracked with guilt. Surviving monks kill the foreigners and stop the bombardment. Refugees under Wudao's leadership flee up the mountainside, crying as they look down at the temple in ruins. Wudao assures them, the Shaolin spirit continues to live in them even though the temple has been destroyed.

Epilogue: It is revealed that, before the evacuation of the temple, Hou met with Yan Xi one last time. Repenting for his past, he gave her the cremation urn containing Shengnan's ashes. Yan Xi forgave him for his past and accepted that she could no longer be with him, even though she prefers his present self. Admitting his role in fostering Cao's evil actions, Hou stated it was his responsibility to try and guide Cao to the correct path.

== Cast ==
- Andy Lau as Hou Jie
- Nicholas Tse as Cao Man
- Jackie Chan as Wudao
- Fan Bingbing as Yan Xi
- Wu Jing as Jingneng
- Xing Yu as Jingkong
- Yu Shaoqun as Jinghai
- Yu Hai as the Shaolin abbot
- Michelle Bai as Tian'er
- Shimada Runa as Hou Shengnan
- Shi Xiaohong as Song Hu
- Liang Jingke as Song Hu's wife
- Hung Yan-yan as Suo Xiangtu
- Chen Zhihui as Huo Long
- Karl Robert Eislen as Peter

== Music ==
The theme song, "Awaken" (悟), was composed by Q.luv (赵钦) and sung by Andy Lau, who also wrote the lyrics.

== Production ==
Filming started in October 2009 with a ceremony held in Shaolin Temple. News first spread of the project when Jackie Chan announced on his official website that he was involved with the project but was not able to talk about it due to contract restrictions.

Chan and his crew built their own "Shaolin Temple" set in Zhejiang that cost 10 million yuan (US$1.47 million) to avoid damaging the actual temple. The cast members shaved their heads for filming, whereas Chan, who wore a hat, only shaved around his head where his hair was sticking out.

Andy Lau's left hand was injured while he was shooting a fight scene.

== Release ==
Shaolin was originally slated for a late 2010 release. It was released in mainland China on 19 January 2011 and in Hong Kong on 27 January. It premiered as number one in the Hong Kong box office, grossing US$592,046 during its first week. The film also took the top spot in the Thai and Singaporean box offices during its opening week. It also went on to break the box office record in Malaysia.

== Reception ==
Shaolin holds a 74% "fresh" rating on Rotten Tomatoes based on 27 reviews.

== Awards and nominations ==
Awards and nominations
Ceremony	Category	Recipient	Outcome
31st Hong Kong Film Awards	Best Supporting Actor	Nicholas Tse	Nominated
31st Hong Kong Film Awards	Best Action Choreography	Corey Yuen, Yuen Tak, Nicky Li	Nominated
31st Hong Kong Film Awards	Best Original Film Song	Song: Wu (悟) Composer: Q. luv Lyricist/Singer: Andy Lau	Nominated
31st Hong Kong Film Awards	Best Art Direction	Yee Chung-Man, Ben Lau	Nominated
