= Phạm Quốc Khánh =

Vietnamese wushu practitioner

Personal information
- Born: 2 September 1990 (age 35) Hanoi, Vietnam
- Height: 1.65 m (5 ft 5 in)
- Weight: 69 kg (152 lb)

Sport
- Sport: Wushu
- Events: Nanquan, Nandao, Nangun
- Team: Vietnamese Wushu Team
Medal record
Representing Vietnam
Men's Wushu
World Championships
Gold medal – first place	2007 Beijing	Nandao
Silver medal – second place	2013 Kuala Lumpur	Nangun
Bronze medal – third place	2017 Kazan	Nanquan
World Cup
Silver medal – second place	2018 Yangon	Nanquan
Asian Games
Silver medal – second place	2006 Doha	Nanquan
Silver medal – second place	2018 Jakarta	Nanquan
Bronze medal – third place	2010 Guangzhou	Nanquan
Asian Championships
Silver medal – second place	2008 Macau	Nanquan
Silver medal – second place	2008 Macau	Nandao
Silver medal – second place	2012 Ho Chi Minh City	Nandao
Silver medal – second place	2012 Ho Chi Minh City	Nangun
Southeast Asian Games
Gold medal – first place	2009 Vientiane	Nanquan
Gold medal – first place	2013 Naypyidaw	Nangun
Gold medal – first place	2019 Philippines	Nanquan
Gold medal – first place	2021 Hanoi	Nandao
Silver medal – second place	2007 Thailand	Nanquan
Silver medal – second place	2011 Jakarta	Nanquan
Silver medal – second place	2015 Singapore	Nanquan
Silver medal – second place	2017 Kuala Lumpur	Nandao
Silver medal – second place	2017 Kuala Lumpur	Nanquan
Silver medal – second place	2021 Hanoi	Nangun
Bronze medal – third place	2013 Naypyidaw	Nandao
Bronze medal – third place	2019 Philippines	Nandao+Nangun

Phạm Quốc Khánh (born 2 September 1990) is a wushu athlete from Vietnam.

== Career ==
Khánh's first major international victory was at the 2006 Asian Games, where he won the silver medal in men's nanquan. A year later, he became the world champion in nanquan at the 2007 World Wushu Championships. He also won the silver medal in nanquan at the 2007 Southeast Asian Games. Two years later, he competed in the 2009 Southeast Asian Games and was able to win the gold medal in nanquan. Almost a year later at the 2010 Asian Games, he won the bronze medal in men's nanquan.

At the 2011 Southeast Asian Games, he won another silver medal in nanquan. Two years later, he won a silver medal in nangun at the 2013 World Wushu Championships followed by a gold medal in the same event and a bronze medal in nandao at the 2013 Southeast Asian Games. At the 2015 Southeast Asian Games, he won another silver medal in nanquan.

Two years later, he was a double silver medalist at the 2017 Southeast Asian Games, achieving victories in nanquan and nandao. At the 2017 World Wushu Championships, he won the bronze medal in nanquan. He was able to qualify for the 2018 Taolu World Cup and went on to win a silver in nanquan. That same year, he won the silver medal in men's nanquan at the 2018 Asian Games. At the 2019 Southeast Asian Games, he was a double medalist, winning the gold medal in nanquan and a bronze medal in nandao and nangun combined. At the 2021 Southeast Asian Games, he won the gold medal in nandao and a silver medal in nangun and declared his retirement.
