= Li Junfeng =

- Born: 13 October 1938 (age 87); Gaocheng, Hebei, China
- Other names: 李俊峰; Lǐ Jùnfēng
- Occupations: Martial artist; actor; author

Master Li Junfeng (born October 13, 1938 in Gaocheng, Hebei) is a qigong master, the founder of Sheng Zhen Meditation, and a world-renowned wushu coach. He has also starred-in and choreographed several Chinese martial arts films.

== Early life ==
Li Junfeng was born in Gaocheng, Hebei, China (Rao 1986, p. 32). As a youth, he earned a position on the Hebei professional rifle team.

In 1960 he enrolled in Beijing Physical Education University’s wushu department and was the captain of the school’s wushu team. In 1964 he was featured in the French TV documentary Day in the Life of a Chinese College Student.

== Wushu coaching career ==
After graduation in 1965 he became a wushu coach at Beijing's Shichahai Sports School. In 1973 the Chinese Central Documentary Film House produced the documentary Beijing Sports School Wushu Team that includes footage of Li Junfeng coaching a young Jet Li. After the school won the national competition in 1974, Beijing accepted Wu Bin’s and his proposal to establish the Beijing Wushu Team, a professional team consisting of students mostly from the Shichahai Sports School.

Li Junfeng with the Women's Beijing Wushu Team

From 1974 to 1988 Li Junfeng was a head coach of the Beijing Wushu Team. During this time the team won the national championship in the group category for 12 straight years (Udo 1998, p. 68) and his students won 56 individual gold medals. In 1984 his students won 10 of the 16 gold medals at the National Wushu Competition in Shanghai, setting the record for the most number of gold medals won by a coach’s students. Li Junfeng also traveled internationally as a national team coach and at the first Asian Wushu Championship in 1987 his team won 13 of 16 gold medals and 3 silver medals (Udo 1998, p. 68).

During his career as a wushu coach, Li Junfeng was awarded one Second Medal Certificate and four Third Medal Certificates from the State Physical Culture and Sports Commission. He was also the Deputy Director of the Chinese Wushu Coach Committee (Rao 1986, p. 32); the Commissioner of the China Wushu Association; and Councilor to the China Wushu Society.

The book In the Spirit of the 2008 Olympics: Extraordinary Chinese Martial Artists of the World highlights Li Junfeng as one of eleven prominent wushu pioneers.

== Film career ==
In 1982 Li Junfeng was selected for the leading role in Wu Lin Zhi, a Chinese martial arts film, and was ultimately awarded a Chinese National Award for “Best Performance by an Actor in a Leading Role.” The film was selected as the “Motion Picture of the Year” by the Chinese Ministry of Culture, translated into five languages and released in the United States under the names The Honor of Dongfang Xu and Deadly Fury. Li Junfeng has appeared in three additional films, was a film action choreographer and hosted the television series, Learning Wushu (Udo 1998, p. 69).

== Philippines ==
In 1988 the Philippines Wushu Federation invited Li Junfeng to become the national team’s head coach. He held the head coach position until 1991 where he began teaching tai chi full-time. The team's greatest achievement came shortly after this, winning 10 gold medals at the 16th Southeast Asian Games in Manila.

== Sheng Zhen Meditation ==
Li Junfeng demonstrating Kuan Yin Standing Qigong.

Li Junfeng was first drawn to meditation and tai chi as a university student and has practiced and taught these disciplines throughout his adult life. He began practicing Sheng Zhen Meditation privately in 1987 and began teaching it in 1994. In 1995 the International Sheng Zhen Society was founded to promote Sheng Zhen Meditation to the world. Li Junfeng is the society's chairman and principal teacher.

Since the founding of the International Sheng Zhen Society Li Junfeng has taught Sheng Zhen Meditation in 25 countries spread across 6 continents. In 2002 Li Junfeng moved to the United States and accepted a position teaching meditation at the AOMA Graduate School of Integrative Medicine in Austin, Texas. He has delivered the keynote address at several conferences including the International Psi Conference, Basle, Switzerland in 2005; and at the American Acupuncturist Association of Oriental Medicine annual conference in 2006 and 2007.

== Publications ==
- Li, Junfeng. Sparring with Long Fist & Single Broad Sword/Spear. China, 1982.
- Li, Junfeng. Learn Wushu Series. China, 1985.
- Li, Junfeng. Martial Arts on Ba Gua Zhang. China, 1987.
- Li, Junfeng. Sheng Zhen Wuji Yuan Gong: A Return to Oneness. Manila, Philippines: International Sheng Zhen Society, 1995.
- Sheng Zhen Wuji Yuan Gong: A Return to Oneness (DVD). Manila, Philippines: International Sheng Zhen Society, 1996.
- Li, Junfeng. Sheng Zhen Healing: Removal of Disease in Three Parts. Manila, Philippines: International Sheng Zhen Society, 1999.
- Sheng Zhen Healing (DVD). Manila, Philippines: International Sheng Zhen Society, 1999.
- Li, Junfeng. Awakening the Soul. Manila, Philippines: International Sheng Zhen Society, 2008.
