= Trail of the Everlasting Hero =

2005 Chinese TV series

- VCD cover art
- Also known as: Xiaying Xianzong
- 侠影仙踪
- Genre: Xianxia
- Based on: Biographies of Immortals by Ge Hong
- Screenplay by: Li Xiaowei; Zhang Xian
- Directed by: Kuk Kwok-leung; Zou Jicheng
- Presented by: Xu Yong'an; Chen Jinhai
- Starring: Zhou Jie; Sun Feifei; Xu Yun; Ti Lung; Ning Jing; Yu Chenghui; Hashimoto Reika; Tan Junyan
- Opening theme: "Courage of the Sword and Heart of the Guqin" (剑胆琴心)
- Ending theme: "Love and Hatred in the World" (情恨红尘中) by Cecilia Han
- Country of origin: China
- Original language: Mandarin
- No. of episodes: 30

Production
- Executive producer: Li Xiaowei
- Producer: Cao Yong
- Production location: Hengdian World Studios
- Cinematography: Jiang Jizheng; Lin Boren
- Running time: ≈45 minutes per episode
- Production companies: Hengdian Entertainment; Dragon Television; Jinhua Local Government

Original release
- Network: Zhejiang Television
- Release: 5 October 2005 – 2006

Trail of the Everlasting Hero (侠影仙踪) is a Chinese xianxia television series based on the legend of the immortal Wong Tai Sin (Huang Daxian) as told in the novel Biographies of Immortals (神仙传) by Ge Hong. Directed by Kuk Kwok-leung and Zou Jicheng, the series starred Zhou Jie, Sun Feifei, Xu Yun, Ti Lung, Ning Jing, Yu Chenghui, Hashimoto Reika and Tan Junyan. The series was first broadcast on Zhejiang TV Cultural Channel in mainland China in October 2005.

== Synopsis ==
Set in fourth-century China during the Jin dynasty, the series follows the life of Huang Chuming before he attains immortality and becomes widely known as Wong Tai Sin (Huang Daxian).As he encounters powerful enemies, friendships, and supernatural forces, he gradually learns about his destiny and the path toward immortality while facing struggles between good and evil.

== Cast ==
- Zhou Jie as Huang Chuming
- Sun Feifei as Liu Yixi
- Xu Yun as Murong Yan
- Ti Lung as Wang Xizhi
- Ning Jing as Empress Dowager Yu
- Yu Chenghui as Taoist Chisong
- Hashimoto Reika as Su Tong
- Tan Junyan as Cao Jun
- Li Qingxiang as Marshal Cao
- Ji Chunhua as Shi Kongchen
- Li Fei as Shangguan Jianshi
- Zhang Zhilü as Sima Dan
- Li Xuesong as Shangguan Jue
- Sun Wei as Ding Kai
- Jin Song as Haotian
- Yan Hongzhi as Yitian

== Production ==
Filming for the series started in June 2004 at Hengdian World Studios with a budget of 20 million yuan.

The principal crew and cast members of Xiaying Xianzong went to Hangzhou on 29 September 2005 to promote the television series, which was first shown on Zhejiang TV Cultural Channel on 5 October.

On 2 July 2004, Liu Yunshan, the head of the Publicity Department of the Chinese Communist Party, visited Hengdian and interacted with the crew and cast members.
