= 2008 Beijing Wushu Tournament – Men's daoshu and gunshu =

Wushu tournament

Men's daoshu and gunshu at the 2008 Beijing Wushu Tournament
- Venue: Olympic Sports Center Gymnasium
- Dates: 21 August
- Competitors: 10 from 10 nations

Medalists
gold medal	Zhao Qingjian	China
silver medal	Jia Rui	Macau
bronze medal	Cheng Chung Hang	Hong Kong

The men's daoshu / gunshu all-around competition at the 2008 Beijing Wushu Tournament was held on August 21 at the Olympic Sports Center Gymnasium.

== Background ==
Zhao Qingjian and Jia Rui were clearly the favorites ahead of the competition. Zhao was nearing the end of his competitive career, having won multiple times at the World Wushu Championships, East Asian Games, and at the National Games of China. Jia, who was nine years younger, was still starting his international competitive career, but was already a medalist at the 2006 Asian Games, East Asian Games, and the World Wushu Championships. At the 2007 World Wushu Championships, Zhao won the gold medal in daoshu and Jia won the gold medal. Zhao dropped out of the gunshu event and Jia was able to win the gold medal. At the Beijing Wushu Tournament, Zhao Qingjian won both events by a wide margin, obtaining the second-highest combined score in the entire competition.

== Schedule ==
All times are Beijing Time (UTC+08:00)

Date	Time	Event
Thursday, 21 August, 2008	09:30	Daoshu
Thursday, 21 August, 2008	20:03	Gunshu

== Results ==
The events were judged without the degree of difficulty component.

Legend
- DNS — Did not start

Rank	Athlete	Daoshu	Gunshu	Total
1st place, gold medalist(s)	Zhao Qingjian (CHN)	9.85	9.85	19.70
2nd place, silver medalist(s)	Jia Rui (MAC)	9.75	9.59	19.34
3rd place, bronze medalist(s)	Cheng Chung Hang (HKG)	9.59	9.60	19.19
4	Trần Đức Trọng (VIE)	9.62	9.55	19.17
5	Radik Zaripov (RUS)	9.55	9.58	19.13
6	Lee Jong-Chan (KOR)	9.58	9.54	19.12
7	Hsiao Yung-Sheng (TPE)	9.50	9.24	18.74
8	Efrén Rodríguez (CUB)	9.22	9.25	18.47
9	Andrzej Topczewski (POL)	9.25	9.13	18.38
10	Andrii Koval (UKR)	9.35	DNS	9.35
