= Wushu at the 2010 Asian Games – Men's nanquan & nangun =

Men's nanquan & nangun at the 2010 Asian Games
- Venue: Nansha Gymnasium
- Dates: 15 November 2010
- Competitors: 17 from 15 nations

Medalists
gold medal	Huang Guangyuan	China
silver medal	He Jingde	Hong Kong
bronze medal	Phạm Quốc Khánh	Vietnam

The men's Nanquan / Nangun all-round competition at the 2010 Asian Games in Guangzhou, China was held on 15 November at the Nansha Gymnasium.

== Schedule ==
All times are China Standard Time (UTC+08:00)

Date	Time	Event
Monday, 15 November 2010	08:30	Nanquan
Monday, 15 November 2010	14:30	Nangun

== Results ==
Legend

- DNS — Did not start

Rank	Athlete	Nanquan	Nangun	Total
1st place, gold medalist(s)	Huang Guangyuan (CHN)	9.87	9.86	19.73
2nd place, silver medalist(s)	He Jingde (HKG)	9.66	9.74	19.40
3rd place, bronze medalist(s)	Phạm Quốc Khánh (VIE)	9.65	9.68	19.33
4	Hsu Kai-kuei (TPE)	9.65	9.65	19.30
5	Kim Tae-ho (KOR)	9.66	9.57	19.23
6	Farshad Arabi (IRI)	9.72	9.50	19.22
7	Koki Nakata (JPN)	9.42	9.68	19.10
8	Soe Kyaw (MYA)	9.53	9.48	19.01
9	Heryanto (INA)	9.14	9.60	18.74
10	Siamphone Kongmany (LAO)	8.61	8.74	17.35
11	Bountang Song (LAO)	8.60	8.55	17.15
12	Raju Maharjan (NEP)	9.06	7.99	17.05
13	Rustam Eshenkulov (KGZ)	8.24	8.56	16.80
14	Somorjit Sagolsem (IND)	8.10	7.65	15.75
15	Oleg Kirilov (KGZ)	7.46	7.65	15.11
16	Masbah Uddin (BAN)	6.95	DNS	6.95
—	Taza Gul Logari (AFG)			DNS
