= Snow Blossom =

2014 Chinese film by Koan Hui

- Film poster
- 大寒桃花开
- Directed by: Koan Hui
- Written by: Charcoal Tan
- Produced by: Hua Han
- Starring: Yang Mi; Feng Shaofeng; Yu Chenghui; Zhang Bo
- Music by: Li Xianyou
- Production company: Shanghai Pengjin Entertainment
- Distributed by: Beijing Talent Canlan Television & Film
- Release date: January 17, 2014
- Running time: 90 minutes
- Country: China
- Language: Mandarin
- Box office: CN¥1.14 million

Snow Blossom (大寒桃花开) is a 2014 Chinese romantic wuxia film directed by Koan Hui, starring Yang Mi, Feng Shaofeng, Yu Chenghui, and Zhang Bo. It was released on January 17, 2014.

== Synopsis ==
The film is set in third-century BC China during the Warring States period. Taohua, who has grown up in poverty but trained herself to be well-versed in both scholarly and martial arts, takes part in an audition by Lord Mengchang to select a bride for his son. By chance, she meets Dahan, an assassin who has a similar background as her and has been sent to kill Lord Mengchang's guests. Their paths cross and they start a romantic relationship.

== Cast ==
- Yang Mi as Taohua
- Feng Shaofeng as Dahan
- Yu Chenghui as Xingdi
- Zhang Bo as Lichun
- Chen Rui as Lord Mengchang
- Liu Wei as Gujin Wuyong
- Chen Guiling as Baihe

== Reception ==
The film earned CN¥1.14 million at the Chinese box office.
