= Wu Bin (wushu coach) =

Chinese martial artist

Wu Bin (simplified Chinese: 吴彬; traditional Chinese: 吳彬; pinyin: Wú Bīn; born 1937) is a chinese martial artist and wushu coach who has produced more wushu champions than any other coach in China.

Wu began his career after graduating from the Beijing Physical Culture University Wushu Department in 1963 by becoming a coach of the famous Beijing Wushu Team.

From 1986 to 1992, Wu Bin also held a position as Chairman of the Technical Department of the Chinese Wushu Research Institute. Presently, Wu Bin is the president of the Beijing Wushu Institute, the director of the Beijing Wushu Team, as well as holding top positions in the Chinese Wushu Association, Asian Wushu Federation, International Wushu Federation, and the World Fighting Martial Arts Federation (WFMAF). He has also written 18 books, and is one of only 19 9th-level duan masters in China.

Wu Bin has teamed up with American Bonnie Hood and held Young Champions summer camps to teach young students basic wushu. Following these summer camps Wu Bin invited a select few students to train in China with his athletes. Now, some of his athletes reside in the US and continue to train students in wushu and tai chi including shifu Wang Fang otherwise known as coach Kelly in Michigan's Oriental Martial Arts Center. Also a representative of Wu Bin is American martial artist/ performer Kenny Perez who has trained with Wu Bin since 1981 and helped pioneer Wushu in America. Shifu Jinheng Li, a long-time student of Wu Bin, teaches throughout the United States under the World Martial Arts Academy

== Notable students ==
- Jet Li
- Hao Zhihua
- Donnie Yen (visitor)
- He Jingde
- Jian Zengjiao
- Liu Qinghua
- Hei Zhihong
- Wu Jing
- Zhao Qingjian
