= Sil-Metropole Organisation =

Hong Kong film company

Sil-Metropole Organisation Ltd. (Chinese: 銀都機構有限公司; Cantonese Yale: Ngàhndōu Gēikau Yáuhhaahn Gūngsī) is a Hong Kong production company involved in the co-production and distribution of films made throughout Hong Kong and China.

== Background ==
=== History ===
After World War II, Shanghai filmmakers moved to Hong Kong and established four production companies: Great Wall Movie Enterprises Ltd, the Feng Huang Motion Pictures Co., the Sun Luen Film Co. and the Chung Yuen Motion Picture Co., a joint venture between Great Wall and Sun Luen. These four companies were highly influential in the early 1950s. They were known as "left-wings" and often made idealistic movies that were social commentaries. Few were of the Kung Fu genre, but the collective library does include Shaolin Temple and Kids from Shaolin.

After China's Cultural Revolution in the mid-1970s, the Chinese audience largely dried up. In 1982, the four companies decided to merge and became today's Sil-Metropole. While Sil-Metropole is a Hong Kong-registered company with an island office of around 50 people, it is managed by the Chinese Government.

=== Company ===
Sil-Metropole is given the same status as a Mainland China state-owned studio, allowing it to be the Chinese partner on co-productions. Its portfolio ranges from co-productions to distribution, as well as TV series and operating a Hong Kong studio and theater.

Sil-Metropole typically works on more than 10 co-productions a year as a Chinese partner. Some of its projects include Three Kingdoms: Resurrection of the Dragon, Hero, Invisible Target, Throw Down, Confession of Pain and Star Runner. The company is also involved in television series and currently produces its own projects.

While its arthouse theater Cine-Art was closed down in late 2006, Sil-Metropole still owns and operates the Silver Theater in Kwun Tong, Hong Kong, which it has had since 1963 under one of the original four companies.
