= Shaolin Temple (1982 film) =

1982 Hong Kong-Chinese film by Chang Hsin Yen

The Shaolin Temple
- Japanese poster

Chinese name
- Traditional Chinese: 少林寺
- Simplified Chinese: 少林寺
Transcriptions
Standard Mandarin
- Hanyu Pinyin: Shàolínsì
Yue: Cantonese
- Jyutping: Siu3 Lam4 Zi2
- Directed by: Chang Hsin-yen
- Written by: Shih Hou; Lu Shau Chang
- Produced by: Liu Yet Yuen
- Starring: Jet Li; Ding Lan; Yu Hai
- Cinematography: Lau Fung-lam; Chau Pak-ling
- Edited by: Wong Ting; Ku Chi-wai; Li Yuk-wai; Chang Hsin-yen
- Music by: Wong Lap-ping
- Production company: Chung Yuen Motion Picture Company
- Release date: 21 January 1982
- Running time: 95 minutes
- Countries: Hong Kong; China
- Language: Mandarin
- Budget: HK$1.6 million (US$264,000)
- Box office: US$111.9 million

The Shaolin Temple (Chinese: 少林寺) is a 1982 martial arts film directed by Chang Hsin-yen and starring Jet Li in his debut role (credited as Jet Lee in the film) along with Ding Lan and Yu Hai in supporting roles. A Hong Kong-Chinese co-production, the film is based on the Shaolin Monastery in China and depicts Shaolin Kung Fu. The film was among the first major co-productions between Hong Kong and mainland China, and the first to be filmed in mainland China with a mostly mainland cast. The film's plot has an episodic storytelling structure while combining action, comedy and romance elements.

It was the first martial arts film to be made in mainland China after the founding of the People's Republic of China; up until then, kung fu films and wuxia films were mostly made in Hong Kong and Taiwan. It was also the first film to be shot at the Shaolin Monastery. It sold an estimated 500 million tickets at the Chinese box office, and is estimated to be China's highest-grossing film ever when adjusted for inflation. The film's success established Jet Li as the first Mainland Chinese star of Hong Kong, and later Hollywood. It was also largely responsible for turning the Shaolin Monastery into a major tourist destination, both within China and internationally.

A remake of the film was released in 2011 titled Shaolin and starred Andy Lau, Nicholas Tse and Jackie Chan.

== Plot ==
In China, during the rebellions at the end of the Sui dynasty, the general Wang Shichong installs himself as Prince of Zheng in the eastern capital of Luoyang. His nephew, Wang Renze, oversees the bolstering of his riverfront defenses against the rival warlords on the bank of the Yellow River. The work of the slaves is not fast enough for him, so he orders his prisoners, who are captured rebels, to join the slaves. These rebels include martial artist "Divine Leg Zhang," who witnesses the brutal flogging of the laborers and steps forward to defend them. Wang Renze personally intervenes and severely injures Zhang. Zhang's son, Xiaohu, attempts to stop him, but is easily defeated by Wang Renze. Zhang is killed by Wang Renze as Xiaohu escapes into the Yellow River, eventually drifting ashore and fainting at the gates of the Shaolin Temple.

The Sifu persuades the Abbot to take in Xiaohu, despite the temple's supervisor monk's concern that Xiaohu will bring trouble to Shaolin. The Sifu and his pupils nurse Xiaohu back to health. After he recovers, Xiaohu joins the monks in carrying water from the river to the temple. He struggles, and but is watched by shepherd Bai Wuxia, who sends her dog to chase him. Xiaohu accidentally suffocates the dog, but decides to roast and eat the dog meat with the Sifu and the other pupils. Upon discovering this, Bai Wuxia is furious at Xiaohu, but the Sifu mediates. Xiaohu learns that Bai Wuxia is the Sifu's daughter, and nine years before, they fled Wang Renze's soldiers, reaching the Temple. Wanting to kill Wang Renze, Xiaohu asks the Sifu to train him in Shaolin martial arts. The Sifu says that Shaolin martial arts are for defense, not killing, and that Xiaohu is not a monk.

Xiaohu resolves to become a monk. His head is shaven, and the Abbot ordains him as a junior monk, giving him the Dharma name "Jue Yuan." Jue Yuan begins Shaolin martial arts training. After a time, he has gained impressive fighting abilities, but while sparring, he pictures Wang Renze and nearly kills his partner. He is ordered to face a wall for three days as punishment, but flees from the Temple instead. Jue Yuan attempts to assassinate Wang Renze, during which he finds Bai Wuxia, who had been abducted by Wang Renze that same day. Jue Yuan fails to kill Wang Renze and is forced to flee with Bai Wuxia. Ashamed, he returns to the Temple. His Sifu forgives him and allows him to resume training.

More than a year later, Li Shimin (son of Li Yuan), who is pursued by Wang Renze, enters the Temple. The monks pretend to help Wang Renze hunt for Li Shimin, while the latter escapes. Jue Yuan and Bai Wuxia help Li Shimin, making their way past Wang Renze's patrols in disguise as a newlywed couple. The escape, however, fails. Bai Wuxia and an injured Li Shimin flee on a raft down the river, while Jue Yuan stays behind to fight off the pursuers. His Sifu, along with other monks, arrives and saves Jue Yuan, but in doing so, expose Shaolin Temple's connection with Li Shimin. The Sifu banishes Jue Yuan from the Temple.

Wang Renze learns of what the monks did, and marches on the Temple with his army to destroy it. The Abbot orders the monks not to fight, even as Wang Renze's army surrounds the Temple. The Abbot pleads with Wang Renze for mercy and accepts the blame. He is placed on a pyre, which is set aflame. Wang Renze announces that, if the monks reveal the traitors' whereabouts, he will spare the Temple and the Abbot. He then has his men kill several of the other top monks. The Sifu and his pupils arrive to fight off Wang Renze's forces, and the Abbot permits the monks to take lives as needed, before dying atop the pyre. A battle begins, and many monks are killed.

Jue Yuan and Bai Wuxia return to the Temple. Wang Renze's army takes the outer walls and outer grounds, and kills all the monks there. The surviving monks fall back within the inner walls. The Sifu is mortally wounded by a volley of arrows. Before dying, he entreats Jue Yuan to protect the Temple and uphold justice. Wang Renze receives word that Li Shimin and his army are approaching Luoyang, and they abandon the siege of the Temple. Jue Yuan and the monks ride after Wang Renze, joining the battle at the ravaged Luoyang. Jue Yuan and Wang Renze once again duel on the shore of the Yellow River, with Jue Yuan eventually killing Wang Renze.

Following the events of the war, Li Shimin has established the new Tang dynasty and installed himself as Emperor. Jue Yuan stands in the main hall of the Shaolin Temple as the supervisor monk, now the new Abbot, asks if he can obey the vow to not murder. Jue Yuan vows that he will not kill, save to uphold righteousness, and the Abbot accepts this. Jue Yuan continues to swear his vows, but when he reaches the vow of celibacy, he is again conflicted. After the Sifu's death, Jue Yuan had vowed to inherit his Sifu's legacy and dedicate himself to Shaolin monkhood. Saddened by this, Bai Wuxia gave Jue Yuan an amulet as a token of farewell. Jue Yuan now looks down at the amulet, then sees Bai Wuxia, who has sneaked into a wing of the sanctum. He reluctantly vows to remain celibate, and she leaves. Jue Yuan is ordained as a true Shaolin monk. He also becomes the kung fu Sifu of the Temple, leading the monks in their training.

== Cast ==
- Jet Li as Jue Yuan (Xiaohu)
- Ding Lan as Bai Wuxia
- Yu Hai as Sifu
- Hu Jianqiang as Wu Kong
- Jian-kui Sun as Se Kong
- Liu Huailiang as Liao Kong / Divine Leg Zhang (Jue Yuan's father)
- Wang Jue as Ban Kong
- Du Chuanyang as Wei Kong
- Cui Zhiqiang as Xuan Kong
- Xun Feng as Dao Kong
- Pan Hanguang as Zhi Cao
- Fan Ping as Hui Neng
- Jiang Hongbo as Hui Yin
- Shan Qi Bo Tong as Hui Yang
- Zhang Jianwen as the Abbot
- Yang Dihua as the Supervisor Monk
- Wang Guangkuan as Li Shimin
- Yu Chenghui as Wang Renze (Wang Shichong's nephew)
- Ji Chunhua as Tu Ying
- Pan Qingfu as First General
- Su Fei as Second General
- Chen Guo'an as Third General
- Bian Lichang as Fourth General
- Wang Guoyi as Fifth General
- Kong Fanyan as Sixth General
- Sun Shengjun as Seventh General
- Yan Dihua as Shaolin Senior Monk
- Hung Yan-yan as Shaolin student

== Production ==
The film was produced on a budget of HK$1.6 million (US$264,000).

During production, which took two years to film, Jet Li was reportedly paid only CN¥1 per day while filming.

== Box office ==
In China, it became the highest-grossing film of all time, grossing CN¥161,578,014 (US$85,376,199). The film reportedly sold more than 410 million tickets across China within its first six months of release, eventually selling an estimated total of 500 million tickets in China.

In Hong Kong, the film sold 700,000 tickets, and grossed HK$16.16 million (US$2,662,310), making it the fourth top-grossing film of 1982 in Hong Kong. It became the highest-grossing film of all time in Singapore with a gross of S$1.7 million (US$794,000).

In Japan, it was the fourth top-grossing film of 1982, with ¥1.65 billion in distributor rentals and a box office record of ¥4 billion in gross receipts, equivalent to HK$100 million (US$16.47 million) in gross revenue. In South Korea, the film sold 294,065 tickets in Seoul alone and set a box office record of ₩5.1 billion (US$6.57 million) grossed nationwide in 1983.

This brings the film's total box office gross revenue to US$111,872,509 in East Asia.

Adjusted for inflation at CN¥34.5 Chinese ticket prices in 2017, the film's adjusted gross revenue in China is estimated to be in the tens of billions of Chinese yuan (billions of US dollars) in 2017.

== Accolades ==
- 2nd Hong Kong Film Awards
  - Nomination: Best Action Direction (Yue Hoi, Ma Xianda, Pan Qingfu, Wong Seung-hoi)

== Legacy ==
The film was largely responsible for turning the Shaolin Monastery into a major tourist destination, both within China and internationally. The movie's popularity swiftly encouraged filmmakers in China and Hong Kong to produce more Shaolin-based movies.

The film spawned a revival of popularity in mainstream martial arts in China.

=== Series ===
The film spawned the Shaolin Temple series. Its sequel Shaolin Temple 2: Kids from Shaolin was released in 1984 and stars Jet Li in the lead role again. It sold an estimated 490 million tickets at the Chinese box office, making it 1984's highest-grossing film in China. The first two Shaolin Temple films combined sold an estimated 990 million tickets at the Chinese box office.

Shaolin Temple 3: Martial Arts of Shaolin was released in 1986 and also stars Jet Li in the lead role. A remake of the original film, Shaolin, released in 2011, stars Andy Lau, Nicholas Tse and Jackie Chan.

In 2014, a 3D remake was announced to be in development, with director Justin Lin and produced by Beijing Enlight Pictures.

A 2021 remake of Shaolin Temple titled Rising Shaolin: The Protector, directed by Stanley Tong and starring Wang Baoqiang, uses promotional artwork showing the lead actor emulating Jet Li's pose from the promotional media of the 1982 film.

== See also ==
- List of films by box office admissions
- List of highest-grossing films in China
- List of highest-grossing non-English films
