= Beijing Wushu Team =

Wushu team from Beijing, China

- Game: Wushu, taolu and sanda
- Founded: 1974
- League: Wushu in China
- Based in: Beijing, China
- Location: Shichahai Sports School

The Beijing Wushu Team (Chinese: 北京武术队; pinyin: Běijīng wǔshù duì ) is a world-renowned wushu team from Beijing, China. The team has produced many famous international stars such as Jet Li, Donnie Yen, Hao Zhihua, Huang Qiuyan, Zhang Hongmei and Wu Jing. The Beijing team members also work with movie producers to make films. Aside from Jet Li, many other athletes have also been featured in movies (e.g. Wang Jue has starred in Shaolin Temple.) Every year, the Beijing Team performs demonstrations of wushu for the citizens of Beijing as well as visiting dignitaries. They have performed for former US President Jimmy Carter as well as many other foreign heads of state when they visited Beijing.

== History ==
The Beijing Wushu School was created in order to prepare the city of Beijing for the first National Games of China in 1959. Beijing Sports University (now Beijing Physical Education University) wushu department graduate Liu Peiwei was appointed the team leader and coach. In 1974, the school was reformed as the Beijing Wushu Team in November 1974 by Wu Bin and Li Junfeng. Since then it has been based at the Shichahai Sports School.

In the nearly three decades since its founding and through the hard work of the athletes and coaches, the team has achieved remarkable levels of success. From 1974 to 1997, they won the National team championship 11 times. From 1975 to 1985, the Beijing Wushu Team achieved a feat that no team has ever accomplished, before or since – winning the championship for ten consecutive years. The Beijing Wushu Team received 40 individual gold medals during this 10-year reign.

Many of the earlier generations of Beijing Wushu Team athletes have gone on to teach wushu abroad. Many have emigrated to the US, Australia, Japan and other parts of Asia.

== Members ==
=== First Generation Beijing Wushu team ===
Coaches

- Wu, Bin: Beijing, China
- Li, Jun Feng: Texas, USA
- Cheng, Hui Kun: Beijing, China

Men's Team Members

- Li, Jin Heng: Arizona, USA
- Yan, Ping: Beijing, China
- Dong, Hong Lin: Beijing, China
- Wang, Qun: Beijing, China 1960 - 2008
- Sun, Jian Ming: Tokyo, Japan
- Wang, Jian Jun: Tokyo, Japan
- Li, Zhi Zhou: Singapore
- Yang, Yong Li: Beijing, China
- Yu, Shao Wen: Oregon, USA
- Cui, Ya Hui: Beijing, China
- Li, Lian Jie (Jet Li): Shanghai, China
- Tang, Lai Wei: Victoria, Australia

Women's Team Members

- Li, Xia: Tokyo, Japan
- Ge, Chun Yan: Singapore
- Mi, Jin Bei: Beijing, China
- Zhang, De Hua: Beijing, China 1960 -2008
- Zhou, Jing Ping: California, USA
- Huang, Xiao Feng: Beijing, China
- Zhang, Gui Feng: Maryland, USA
- Hao, Zhi Hua: California, USA
- Zhang, Hong Mei: California, USA
- Huang, Qiu Yan: California, USA
- Wang, Xiu Ping: Beijing, China
- Hui, Xu Na: Beijing, China
- Lu, Yan: Beijing, China

== Beijing Wushu Team Performance Tours ==
The team has showcased its skills through the Beijing Wushu Team Tour many times over the years. The worldwide tours showcase a mix of veteran athletes and rising stars demonstrating their routines.

=== Other Tours ===
In 1995 they performed in Los Angeles, San Diego, San Francisco, Berkeley, CA and Calgary, Alberta, Canada. In 1999 they were invited to perform at Arnold Schwarzenegger's Annual Arnold Classic. The team performed and served as judges for the 1998 and 1999 Intercollegiate Wushu Championships (now known as the Collegiate Wushu Tournament) in America as well. In early 1999 they performed in Hawaii during a tribute to Jackie Chan. The 2005 tour saw the team performing in Washington DC, Houston, San Francisco and Los Angeles. In January 2012, the team returned to the United States with a limited four show tour in the San Francisco Bay area.

Beijing Wushu Team - 2012 Tour Trailer
