= Kids from Shaolin =

1984 Hong Kong-Chinese film by Chang Hsin-yen

- Japanese poster
- Traditional Chinese: 少林小子
- Simplified Chinese: 少林小子
- Hanyu Pinyin: Shàolín Xiǎozǐ
- Jyutping: Siu3 Lam4 Siu2 Zi2
- Directed by: Chang Hsin-yen
- Screenplay by: Leung Chi-keung; Ho Shu-wa
- Produced by: Fu Qi
- Starring: Jet Li; Huang Qiuyan; Yu Chenghui; Yu Hai; Ding Lan; Hu Jianqiang
- Cinematography: Chau Pak-ling
- Edited by: Koo Chi-wai; Lee Yuk-wai
- Music by: Yu Feng
- Production company: Chung Yuen Motion Picture Co.
- Distributed by: Chung Yuen Motion Picture Co.
- Release date: 26 January 1984
- Running time: 99 minutes
- Countries: Hong Kong; China
- Languages: Mandarin; Cantonese
- Box office: US$40 million (China/HK); 294,065 tickets (Seoul)

Kids from Shaolin, also known as Shaolin Temple 2: Kids from Shaolin, is a 1984 kung fu comedy film directed by Chang Hsin-yen. A Hong Kong-Chinese co-production, it stars Jet Li, Yu Chenghui, Yu Hai and Ding Lan from the original 1982 Shaolin Temple film, which is also directed by Chang. However, the plot has no relation to the first film, and Kids from Shaolin is a sequel to the original in name only. Like Shaolin Temple, the plot of Kids From Shaolin combines martial arts, comedy and romance elements.

== Plot ==
In the late Ming Dynasty, former Shaolin monk, Tianlong ("Heaven Dragon"), and his younger brother, Yilong ("Earth Dragon"), raise eight orphan boys whom they saved from murdering bandits ravaging their home village. The children refer to Tianlong as their father and Yilong as their uncle and are taught Shaolin kungfu by the two. All have taken the last character name of Long (龙/龍). They settle at the mountainous area at Lijiang where they live in a hut.

The Long boys are playful and often bicker and fight with the daughters of the Bao family who live just across the river and practice Wudangquan. The mischievous Sanlong ("Third Dragon"), the oldest of the Long children, likes to tease the third sister of the Bao family, Sanfeng ("Third Phoenix") who is a tomboy in her late teens and who has a nasty temper.

The Bao patriarch Bao Sanfeng is trying for a boy heir, yet he has only nine daughters. Meanwhile, the Long family are saving up in order to pay the bride price - ten oxen - so that Tianlong can marry the eldest Bao girl, Taifeng. The marriage plans are met with some resistance: the Bao matriarch likes Tianlong, but Bao Sanfeng believes he is out to steal his Wudang martial arts. Nonetheless, he agrees to marry off his eldest daughter if his wife gives birth to a son.

Meanwhile, the vicious bandits who orphaned the eight Long boys have been training in secret for ten years to revenge the Shaolin counter-attack which injured them when they looted the village. A cross-eyed member of the bandits poses as a Taoist soothsayer to infiltrate the Baos to learn their martial arts and abduct their daughters. The Bao matriarch manages to conceive and bear a male son. The bogus priest now dupes Bao Sanfeng into believing the Long family is his nemesis. The Long family, he claims, has been throwing off the yin and yang balance for the Bao, making it impossible for the wife to bear a male heir.

Bao Safeng changes his mind and refuses to accept the Long family's bride price. Yilong is in love with Yifeng, the second daughter, and to fulfill the couple, Sanlong and Sanfeng help the two elope. For their disobedience against feudal rules, Sanfeng and Sanlong are sentenced to be drowned, but the two manage to escape underwater. Sanlong hides Sanfeng in a cave. Sanlong is struck by Sanfeng's beauty in female clothes and Sanfeng is grateful to Sanlong for rescuing her. The two develop romantic feelings for each other. The bogus priest informs Bao Sanfeng where his daughter is hiding and Bao Sanfeng pursues her, then fights Sanfeng in the cave, accusing the latter of abducting his daughter and stealing his swordplay style. Tianlong finds the two fighting, breaks them up and allows Bao Sanfeng to bring Sanfeng home.

Meanwhile, the Long boys are maligned by the bogus priest for abducting the Bao newborn. The Long family vow never to step into the Bao residence again.Once their evil plot has become successful, the bandits burn down the Long's hut and show their true colors to Bao Sanfeng. They attempt to kidnap his daughters. The Bao family tries desperately to fight them until the Long family arrives. By combining their martial arts expertise, the two families roundly defeat and kill all remaining bandits. Soon after, Tianlong marries Taifeng (the eldest daughter) while Yilong marries Yifeng. The families are reconciled.

== Cast ==
Character	Actor	Role
Tianlong	Yu Hai	Shaolin "dad"
Yilong	Hu Jianqiang	Shaolin "uncle"
Sanlong	Jet Li	oldest Shaolin son
Bao Sanfeng	Yu Chenghui	father/head of Wudang clan
Bao Yifeng	Ding Lan	second Wudang daughter
Bao Sanfeng	Huang Qiuyan	third Wudang daughter
	Ji Chunhua	one-eyed bandit
	Sun Jian-kui	cross-eyed bandit
	Pan Qingfu	kabuki bandit
	Hung Yan-yan	Shaolin student

== Box office ==
The film grossed CN¥86 million (US$37 million) in China and HK$22,287,595 (US$2,850,805) in Hong Kong, for a combined US$39,850,805 in China and Hong Kong.

In South Korea, the film sold 294,065 tickets in the capital city of Seoul.
