= 2001 National Games of China =

Multi-sport event in Guangzhou, China

9th National Games of the People's Republic of China
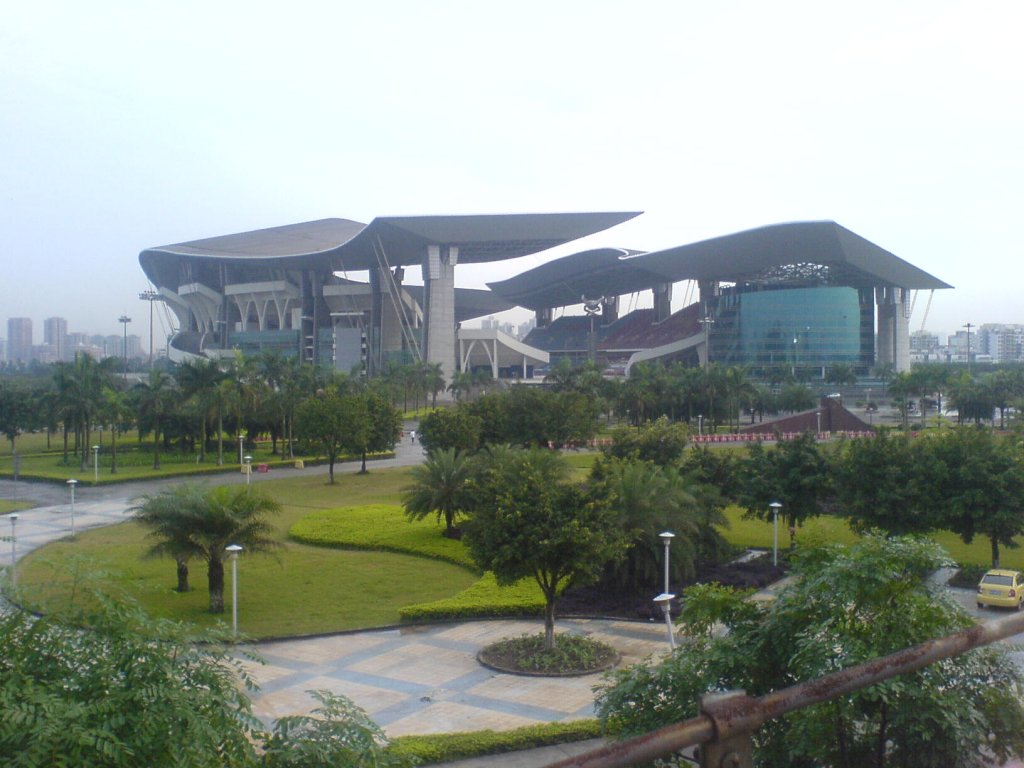
- The Guangdong Olympic Stadium was the main venue for the games and hosted the opening and closing ceremonies
- Host city: Guangzhou, Guangdong
- Country: China
- Teams: 45
- Athletes: 8608
- Events: 345
- Opening: 11 November 2001
- Closing: 25 November 2001
- Opened by: Jiang Zemin (CCP General Secretary & President)
- Main venue: Guangdong Olympic Stadium

The 9th National Games of China was a multi-sport event that was held in Guangzhou, Guangdong Province, China from 11–25 November 2001.

The main stadium for the games was the Guangdong Olympic Stadium. A total of 345 events were contested in 30 sports – 27 were summer sports and the remaining three were skating winter sports. The games featured 8608 athletes from 45 delegations, including the various Chinese provinces and regions as well as occupational divisions (e.g. People's Liberation Army, China Railway Corporation). The CCP General Secretary and President of China Jiang Zemin officially opened the games at the opening ceremony.

The ninth national games were hosted soon after Beijing had been successful in its host bid for the 2008 Summer Olympics. As a result, many prominent international guests were invited to the games in Guangzhou, including IOC president Jacques Rogge. The international dimension of the games was increased in comparison to previous years as many of the delegations had appointed foreign-born coaches and foreign referees were invited to the event to improve impartiality judge-based sports. High performances levels were achieved in a number of sports: seven women's weightlifting world records were broken, six Asian records were beaten in swimming, cycling and athletics, and a total of 37 Chinese national records were set during the 15-day competition.

== Participating delegations ==
- People's Liberation Army
- Beijing
- Tianjin
- Hebei
- Shanxi
- Inner Mongolia
- Liaoning
- Jilin
- Heilongjiang
- Shanghai
- Jiangsu
- Zhejiang
- Anhui
- Fujian
- Jiangxi
- Shandong
- Henan
- Hubei
- Hunan
- Guangdong
- Guangxi
- Hainan
- Chongqing
- Sichuan
- Guizhou
- Yunnan
- Tibet
- Shaanxi
- Gansu
- Qinghai
- Ningxia
- Xinjiang
- Hong Kong
- Macau
- Xinjiang Production and Construction Corps
- China Railway Corporation
- China Finance
- China Coal
- China Resources Vanguard Shop
- Sino-Forest Corporation
- China Petrochemical Corporation
- Aviation Industry Corporation of China
- China Construction
- China Water Sports Association
- China Electricity

== Sports ==
There were a total of 30 sports at the 9th National Games.

- Aquatics
  - Diving
  - Swimming
  - Synchronized swimming
  - Water polo
- Archery
- Athletics
- Badminton
- Baseball
- Basketball
- Boxing
- Canoeing
- Cycling
- Equestrian
- Fencing
- Football
- Gymnastics
  - Artistic gymnastics
  - Rhythmic gymnastics
- Handball
- Hockey
- Judo
- Modern pentathlon
- Rowing
- Shooting
- Skating
  - Figure skating
  - Short speed skating
  - Long speed skating
- Softball
- Table tennis
- Tennis
- Volleyball
- Weightlifting
- Wrestling
- Wushu
- Yachting

== Medal table ==
Rank	Delegation	Gold	Silver	Bronze	Total
1	Guangdong	69.5	48	51.5	169
2	Liaoning	41	31.5	28.5	101
3	People's Liberation Army	33	26	28	87
4	Shanghai	29.5	29.5	24.5	83.5
5	Jiangsu	24.5	21.5	25	71
6	Beijing	23	27	22.5	72.5
7	Shandong	22	22	22	66
8	Hunan	19.5	14.5	17	51
9	Zhejiang	12.5	12.5	17.5	42.5
10	Hubei	12.5	6.5	11	30
11	Jilin	12	17	10	39
12	Hebei	12	10.5	10.5	33
13	Sichuan	9	16	21.5	46.5
14	Fujian	9	9	12.5	30.5
15	Heilongjiang	8.5	10	12	30.5
16	Shanxi	8.5	7	2	17.5
17	Shaanxi	8.5	4.5	4	17
18	Tianjin	8	8	9	25
19	Henan	7.5	18.5	10	36
20	Guangxi	7	7.5	7.5	22
21	Yunnan	7	7.5	5.5	20
22	Inner Mongolia	6.5	2.5	5.5	14.5
23	Anhui	3.5	8.5	11	23
24	Gansu	3.5	4.5	6.5	14.5
25	Jiangxi	3	9.5	5.5	18
26	Xinjiang	2	5	2	9
27	Hong Kong	2	2	1	5
28	Vanguard	2	0	2	4
29	Guizhou	1.5	2.5	4.5	8.5
30	Chongqing	1.5	2.5	3	7
31	Hainan	1	2.5	2	5.5
32	China Railways	1	1.5	1.5	4
33	Qinghai	0	1	2	3
34	Tibet	0	1	0.5	1.5
35	Ningxia	0	0.5	3	3.5
36	Construction	0	0	2	2
37	Financial	0	0	1	1
Totals (37 entries)		411.5	398	405	1,214.5
