= Jet Li =

Martial artist and actor (born 1963)

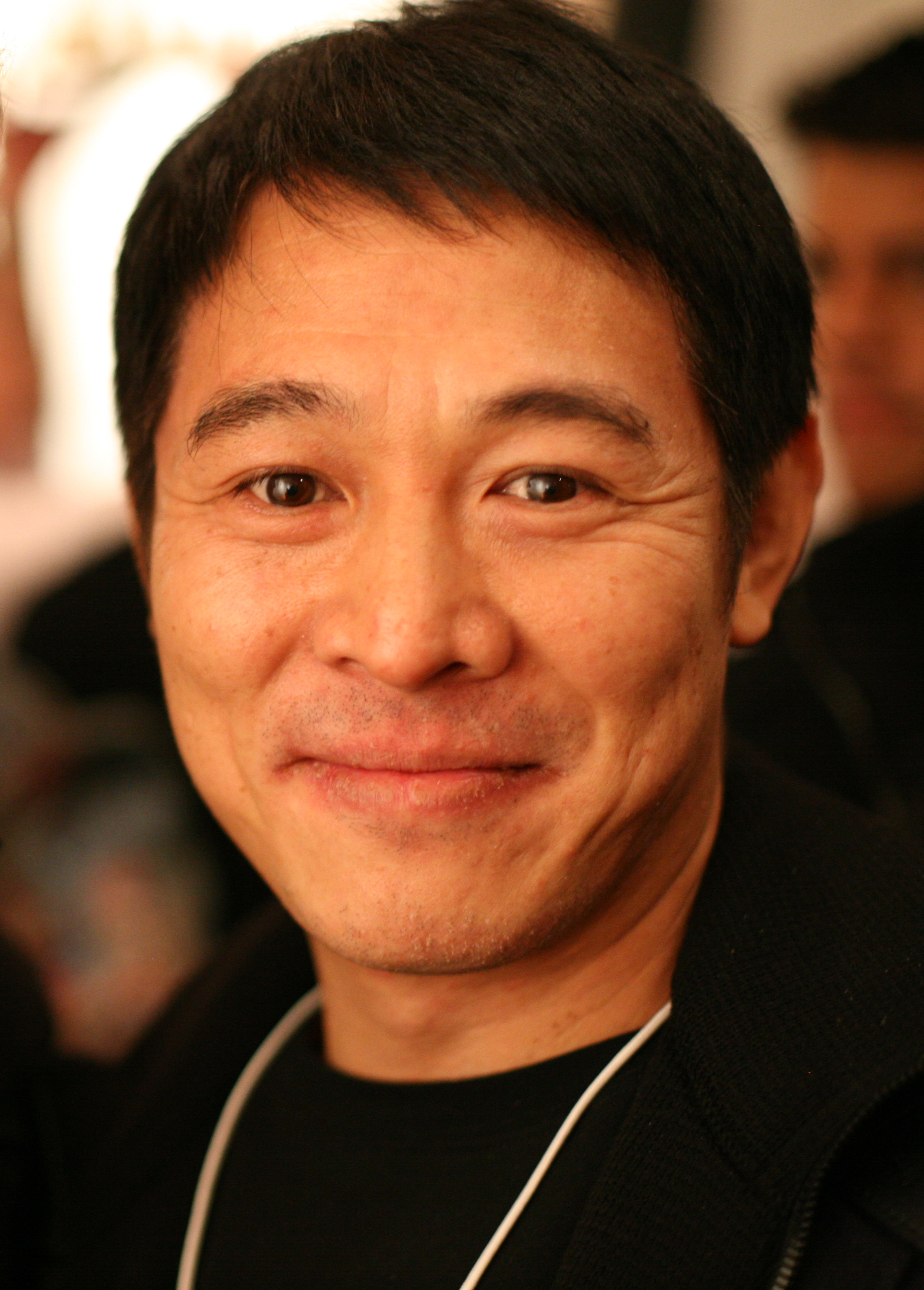
- Li in 2009
- Born: Li Lianjie; 26 April 1963 (age 63); Beijing, China
- Citizenship: China (until 1997); US (1997–2009); Singapore (from 2009)
- Occupations: Martial artist; actor; philanthropist; film producer; director
- Years active: 1982–present
- Height: 1.68 m (5 ft 6 in)
- Spouses: Huang Qiuyan (m. 1987; div. 1990) Nina Li Chi (m. 1999)
- Children: 4

Chinese name
- Traditional Chinese: 李連傑
- Simplified Chinese: 李连杰
Transcriptions
Standard Mandarin
- Hanyu Pinyin: Lǐ Liánjié
- Wade–Giles: Li Lien-chieh
- IPA: [lì ljɛ̌n.tɕjě]
Yue: Cantonese
- Jyutping: Lei5 Lin4 Git6
- Hong Kong Romanisation: Lee Lin Kit
- IPA: [le̬i lɪ̏ŋkìt]

Li Yangzhong
- Traditional Chinese: 李陽中
- Simplified Chinese: 李阳中
Transcriptions
Standard Mandarin
- Hanyu Pinyin: Lǐ Yángzhōng
- Wade–Giles: Li Yang-chung
- IPA: [lì jǎŋʈʂʊ́ŋ]
Yue: Cantonese
- Jyutping: Lei5 Joeng4 Zung1
- Hong Kong Romanisation: Lee Yeung Chong
- IPA: [le̬i jœ̏ŋtsʊ́ŋ]
- Website: www.jetli.com

Jet Li Lianjie (courtesy name Yangzhong; born 26 April 1963) is a martial artist, actor, and philanthropist. With a career spanning more than forty years, he is widely regarded as one of the most influential martial artists in cinema history. Li's early work in mainland China during the 1980s is credited with introducing the Shaolin Temple to a global audience. During the 1990s, his collaborations with filmmaker Tsui Hark spearheaded wushu representation in Hong Kong action cinema, establishing him as its most prominent practitioner. He simultaneously popularised the wuxia genre before transitioning to Hollywood in the late 1990s. His crossover success brought global recognition, solidifying his place alongside Jackie Chan as one of the two biggest names in contemporary martial arts cinema.

Li began his career as a competitive martial artist. Trained as a wushu athlete at the Beijing Shichahai Sports School, he won multiple national championships with the Beijing Wushu Team from 1974 to 1979 under the guidance of coach Wu Bin. After retiring from competitive wushu in 1979, he made his feature film debut in Shaolin Temple (1982), a runaway success followed by two sequels (1984 and 1986). Li established himself as a leading Asian action star by portraying folk hero Wong Fei-hung in director Tsui Hark's critically acclaimed Once Upon a Time in China series (1991–1993). Following his directorial debut with Born to Defence (1988), he anchored a string of other highly successful 1990s projects; these included the wuxia epics Swordsman II (1992) and Fong Sai-yuk (1993), followed by the martial arts films Tai Chi Master (1993) and Fist of Legend (1994). He then successfully reinvented his screen image with a series of popular gun fu action films, including High Risk (1995), Black Mask (1996), and Hitman (1998).

Li made his Hollywood transition as the antagonist in Lethal Weapon 4 (1998), leading to a prolific international career featuring starring roles in Romeo Must Die (2000) and the Luc Besson-produced films Kiss of the Dragon (2001) and Unleashed (2005). He returned to Asian cinema for Zhang Yimou's Academy Award-nominated Hero (2002) and Fearless (2006), followed by The Warlords (2007), which earned him the Hong Kong Film Award for Best Actor. In 2008, he starred in The Mummy: Tomb of the Dragon Emperor and joined fellow martial arts star Jackie Chan in The Forbidden Kingdom, which marked their landmark first on-screen collaboration. He teamed up with Jason Statham in five films: The One (2001), War (2007), and the first three installments of The Expendables (2010–2014). He then made a high-profile return to the screen in Yuen Woo-ping's 2026 epic Blades of the Guardians, which became the highest-grossing wuxia film of all time worldwide.

As a philanthropist, Li founded One Foundation in 2007, which was registered in 2011 as the first private charitable fundraising organization in China. He also co-founded Taiji Zen, an online health program providing instruction in meditation and tai chi. Li topped Forbes's list of China's richest stars in 2004. He was named by Time magazine as one of the 100 most influential people in 2010.

== Early life and martial arts career ==
Li was born in Beijing, and was the youngest of two boys and two girls. His ancestral home is in Shenyang, Liaoning. When he was two years old, his father died and his family then lived in poverty.

Li was eight when his talent for wushu was noticed as he practiced at a school summer course at the Beijing Sports and Exercise School (now known as Beijing Sport University). Renowned coaches Li Junfeng and Wu Bin made extra efforts to help the talented boy develop. Wu Bin even bought food for Li's family in order to boost Li's protein intake.

At the age of eleven, Li became a member of the 1974 China national wushu team which traveled to the United States during the time of the Ping-pong diplomacy. The group performed for American audiences in Hawaii, San Francisco, New York, and Washington, D.C., and additionally in Mexico City and Hong Kong. When the Chinese National Wushu Team went to perform for President Richard Nixon in the United States, he was asked by Nixon to be his personal bodyguard. Li replied, "I don't want to protect any individual. When I grow up, I want to defend my one billion Chinese countrymen!"

In November of the same year, the Beijing Wushu Team was founded and Li became a member. He became the national all-around champion four times from 1975 to 1979.

My winning first place caused quite a sensation because I was so young. I was 12 years old, and the other two medalists were in their mid- to late twenties. During the awards ceremony, as I stood on the top step of the podium, I was still shorter than the 2nd and 3rd place medalists. It must have been quite a sight.

— Jet Li China's Internet Celebrity

Li is a master of several styles of wushu, especially changquan and fanziquan. He has also studied other arts including baguazhang, taijiquan, xingyiquan, zuiquan (drunken fist), yingzhaoquan (eagle claw), and tanglangquan (praying mantis fist). He also practiced weapons such as gunshu, daoshu, and jianshu as well as sanjiegun (three section staff).

Li retired from competitive wushu when he was only 18 due to a knee injury, but became an assistant coach of the Beijing Wushu team for a few years. Li's martial arts prowess would eventually contribute to his domestic and international fame.

In 2023, Li was inducted into the Martial Arts History Museum Hall of Fame.

== Acting career ==
=== Asia ===
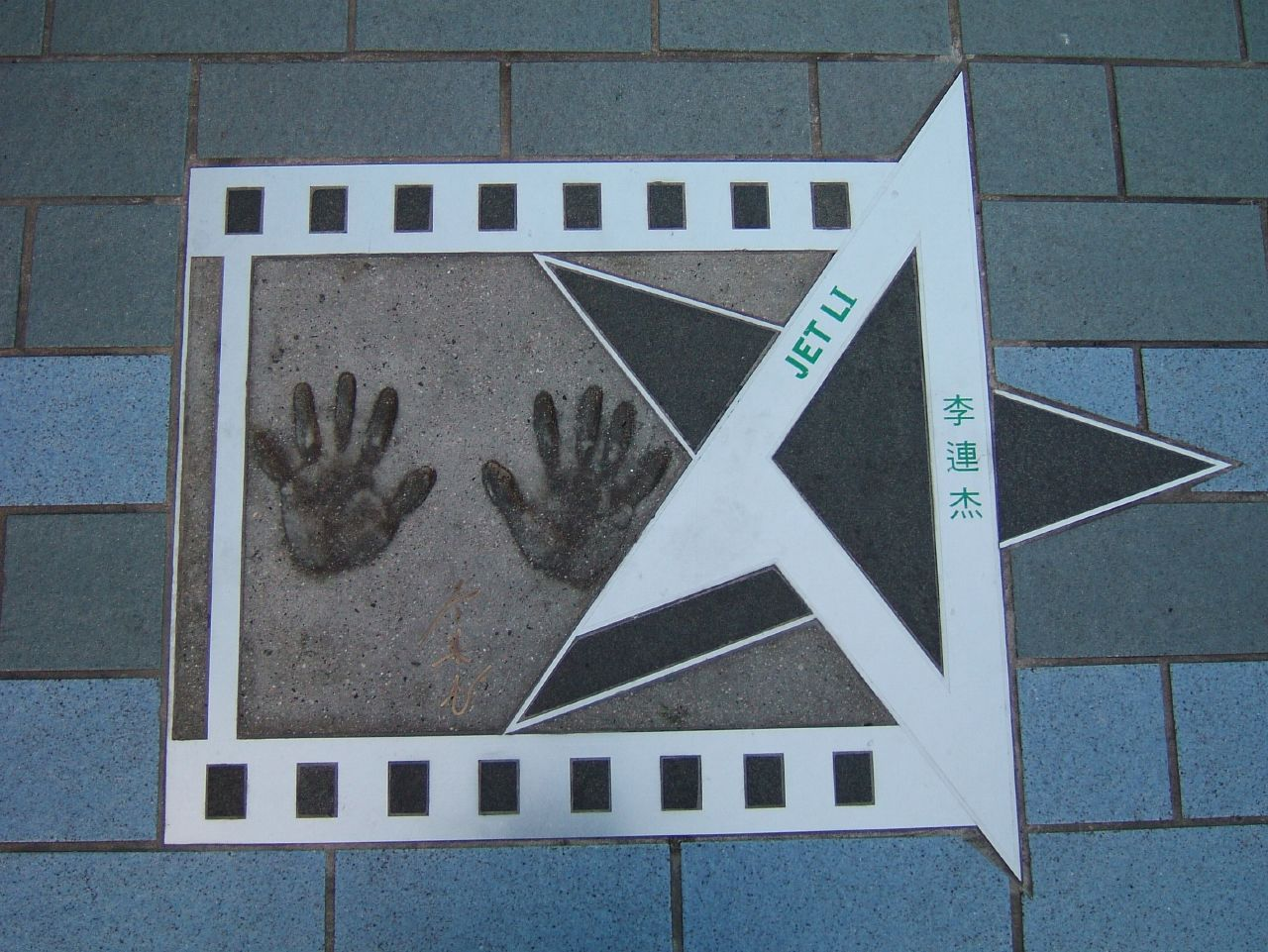
Li's hand print and autograph at the Avenue of Stars in Hong Kong

The fame gained by his sports winnings led to a career as a martial arts film star, beginning in mainland China and then continuing into Hong Kong. Li acquired his screen name in 1982 in the Philippines when a publicity company thought his real name was too hard to pronounce. They likened his career to an aircraft, which likewise "takes-off" as quickly, so they placed the name Jet Li on the movie posters. Soon everybody was calling him by this new name, which was also based on the nickname, "Jet", given to him as a young student, due to his speed and grace when training with the Beijing Wushu team.

He made his film debut with the 1982 film Shaolin Temple. The film broke box office records in China, grossing CN¥161,578,014 (US$85,376,199) at the Chinese box office, from an estimated 500 million ticket sales. The sequel Kids From Shaolin sold an estimated 490 million tickets, making it 1984's highest-grossing film in China.

Some of his more famous Chinese films include:

- The Shaolin Temple series (1, 2 and 3), which are considered to be the films which sparked the rebirth of the real Shaolin Temple in Dengfeng, China;
- The Once Upon a Time in China series (Chinese title: Wong Fei Hung), about the legendary Chinese folk hero Master Wong Fei Hung.
- Fist of Legend (Chinese title: Jing Wu Ying Xiong), a remake of Bruce Lee's Fist of Fury (1972).
- The Fong Sai Yuk films about another Chinese folk hero.

Li starred in the 1995 film High Risk, where Li plays a Captain who becomes disillusioned after his wife is murdered by crime lords. Along the way, he pairs up with a wacky sell-out actor, Frankie (played by Jacky Cheung), and proceeds to engage in a series of violent battles in a high-rise building. The setting is similar to that of Die Hard and both their Chinese film titles. This movie is notable in that director Wong Jing had such a terrible experience working with Jackie Chan in Jing's previous film City Hunter that he chose to make Cheung's character a biting satire of Chan. Li would later publicly apologise to Chan for taking part in it.

Li had two wuxia feature films released in 2011, The Sorcerer and the White Snake and Flying Swords of Dragon Gate; the latter was helmed by Tsui Hark.

To promote tai chi, in 2012, Li starred in a film titled Tai Chi and co-produced the movie with Chen Kuo-Fu. Li portrayed tai chi master Yang Luchan.

=== International career ===
In 1998, he made his international film debut in Lethal Weapon 4 which also marked the first time he had ever played a villain in a film. He agreed to do Lethal Weapon 4 after the producer Joel Silver promised to give him the leading role in his next film, Romeo Must Die (2000), alongside singer Aaliyah. The film became a box office hit. Though Li spoke very little English at the time of production, his performance as Chinese mafia hitman Wah Sing Ku was praised.

Li turned down Chow Yun-fat's role in Crouching Tiger, Hidden Dragon (2000) because he promised his wife that he would not make any films during her pregnancy. He also turned down the role of Seraph in The Matrix trilogy, based on his belief that the role was not one which required his skills and that the films were iconic and stunning enough without adding his name to the cast list. Li was also cast as Kato in The Green Hornet when the film was still in development in 2000. In 2001, it was moved to another studio. When the film was moved on again and released in 2011, the role of Kato was portrayed by Jay Chou.

In 2001, he appeared in two more films: The One, which was the first of his films with Jason Statham, and Kiss of the Dragon opposite Bridget Fonda which did moderately well at the box office. In July 2001, Li agreed to produce and star in an action film with Jackie Chan which was to be released in 2002 or 2003, but no further news of their collaboration surfaced until 2006. In 2002, the period martial arts epic film Hero was released in the Chinese market. This film was both a commercial and critical success and became the highest-grossing motion picture in Chinese film history at the time. In 2003 he reunited with producer Joel Silver for the action thriller film Cradle 2 the Grave where he starred alongside rapper DMX and fellow martial artist Mark Dacascos. In 2004, Li lent his likeness, voice and provided motion capture work for the video game Jet Li: Rise to Honor.

Li was presented the Visionary Award by East West Players, the oldest Asian American theatre in the United States, in 2002 by contemporary John Woo. The award recognizes "artists who have raised the visibility of the Asian Pacific American community through theater, film and television." He delivered his acceptance speech in his native language of Mandarin.

Li took on a more serious role in the 2005 film Unleashed (a.k.a. Danny the Dog), where he portrayed an adult with the mentality of a child who has been raised like an animal. Although his martial arts skills were used extensively, it was a somber film with more depth than had been previously seen in Li's films, and co-starred dramatic actors Bob Hoskins and Morgan Freeman.

In 2006, the martial arts film epic Fearless was released worldwide. Although he will continue to make martial arts films, Fearless is his last wushu martial arts film. In Fearless, he played Huo Yuanjia, the real-life founder of Chin Woo Athletic Association, who reportedly defeated foreign boxers and Japanese martial artists in publicised events at a time when China's power was seen as eroding. Together with the film Fist of Legend, Li has portrayed both Chen Jun, the student and avenger of Huo Yuanjia (a.k.a. Fok Yun Gap), as well as Huo Yuanjia himself. Fearless was released on 26 January 2006 in Hong Kong, followed by a 22 September 2006 release in the United States where it reached second place in its first weekend.

I stepped into the martial arts movie market when I was only 16. I think I have proved my ability in this field and it won't make sense for me to continue for another five or 10 years. Huo Yuanjia is a conclusion to my life as a martial arts star.

Li has stated in an interview with the Shenzhen Daily newspaper that this will be his last martial arts epic, which is also stated in the film's television promotions. However, he plans to continue his film career in other genres. Specifically, he plans to continue acting in epic action and martial arts films dealing more with religious and philosophical issues.

Li's 2007 Hollywood film War was released in August of that year; it re-teamed him with actor Jason Statham, who previously starred with him in The One, and action choreographer Corey Yuen. War raked in a disappointing US$23 million at the box office, becoming one of Li's lowest grossers in America; however, it was a hit on video, accumulating nearly US$52 million in rental revenue, more than doubling its box office take. With the exception of Romeo Must Die and the worldwide release of Hero, most of Li's American/Western films have been only modest hits like Kiss of the Dragon, The One, Unleashed, Cradle 2 the Grave, and the worldwide release of Fearless.

He has a very good control of the strength of every fist and kick. In the past, he used too much strength, those that get hit would be in great pain. He's the archetype of power. […] Yes, he's still the best.

— Yuen Woo-ping martial arts choreographer

Li was appointed by the Chinese Wushu Association as the "Image Ambassador of Wushu" (or IWUF ambassador) at the 2007 World Wushu Championships in Beijing. In late 2007, Li returned again to China to participate in the China/Hong Kong co-production of the period war film The Warlords with Andy Lau and Takeshi Kaneshiro. This film, with its focus on dramatics rather than martial arts, netted Li the Hong Kong Film Award for Best Actor.

Li and fellow martial arts veteran Jackie Chan finally appeared together onscreen for the first time in The Forbidden Kingdom, which began filming in May 2007 and was released to critical and commercial success on 18 April 2008. The film was based on the legend of Sun Wukong the Monkey King from the Chinese folk novel Journey to the West. Li also starred as the lead villain Emperor Han in the fantasy action film The Mummy: Tomb of the Dragon Emperor with actors Brendan Fraser, Isabella Leong and Michelle Yeoh.

In 2009, he launched his own fitness program, Wuji—which consists of elements of martial arts, yoga and pilates—and Adidas launched a special clothing line for it that bears the initials of "JL". After a one-year hiatus from filmmaking, Li returned to acting in 2010, portraying a mercenary in the film The Expendables, teaming up with action stars Sylvester Stallone, Jason Statham, Dolph Lundgren, Mickey Rourke, Eric Roberts, Steve Austin, Terry Crews, and Randy Couture. It was the third time he had teamed up with Statham. In 2012, he reprised his role briefly in the sequel The Expendables 2 and returned for the third film The Expendables 3 in 2014. Li was initially stated to be appearing with Vin Diesel in XXX: Return of Xander Cage, but according to a Facebook post by Diesel, Li was replaced by Donnie Yen.

Li plays the Emperor of China for the 2020 live action movie Mulan.

== Personal life ==
In 1987, Li married Huang Qiuyan, his Beijing Wushu Team fellow member and Kids From Shaolin co-star. They have two daughters, Si and Taimi. He met actress Nina Li Chi during the filming of Dragon Fight (1989) and divorced Huang in 1990. In 1999, Li married Nina at his villa in Arcadia, California, which he owned from 1998 to 2004. The couple have two daughters, Jane (born 2000) and Jada (born 2002).

In 1997, Li obtained US citizenship, which he renounced in April 2009. In July 2009, Amy Zhou Weiyan, then executive chairperson of the One Foundation, confirmed that Li had become a Singaporean citizen. In 2011, Li confirmed his Singaporean citizenship.

In 1998, Li converted to Tibetan Buddhism when he was promoting Lethal Weapon 4 in Taiwan. His master is Lho Kunsang.

In 2013, Li revealed that he suffers from hyperthyroidism and had been dealing with the issue for the past three years. In 2016, Li stated that he was accepting fewer film offers due to his charity work rather than his illness, from which he had recovered.

Li likes to play badminton and table tennis, ride his bicycle, read and meditate in his free time. He collects rare Tibetan beads.

== Views on life and martial arts ==
Li, as a Buddhist, believes that the difficulties of everyday life can be overcome with the help of religious philosophies. He thinks that fame is not something he can control; therefore, he does not care about it.

I never say to myself I'm the best fighter in the world. If someone learns martial arts solely to pick fights on the street, to lean on it as a keystone weapon in conflicts, to use it to bully and intimidate others – then that person, in my opinion, cannot be considered a true martial artist.

According to Li, everything he has ever wanted to tell the world can be found in three of his films: the message of Hero is that the suffering of one person can never be as significant as the suffering of a nation; Unleashed shows that violence is never a solution; and Fearless tells that the biggest enemy of a person is himself. Li thinks that the greatest weapon is a smile and the largest power is love.

About Wushu, he said that he believes the essence of martial arts is not power or speed but inner harmony, and considers it a sad development that today's Wushu championships place greater emphasis on form than on the essence of being a martial artist. He believes Wushu now lacks individuality and competitors move like machines, whereas according to his views Wushu should not be considered a race where the fastest athlete wins. He would like to see Wushu as a form of art, where artists have a distinctive style. Li blames the new competition rules that, according to him, place limitations on martial artists.

Li believes that Wushu is not primarily for self-defense and instead of trying to play the hero people should think about peaceful resolutions of conflicts and call the police if necessary:

"A gun outdoes years of martial arts training in a split second. Like I've said many times before, it is important to differentiate between movies and reality. The hero in movies may be able to knock the gun off his opponent and save the day, but in real life – probably that is not the case."

He has also stated that he has never had to use his martial arts skills in a real-life fight and he does not wish to either.

=== Taiji Zen ===
In 2011, Li founded Taiji Zen, along with co-founder Executive chairman Jack Ma. Taiji Zen combined the martial art of tai chi (taijiquan in Chinese) with practices such as meditation. It packaged these into several different classes and online programs.

=== Philanthropy ===
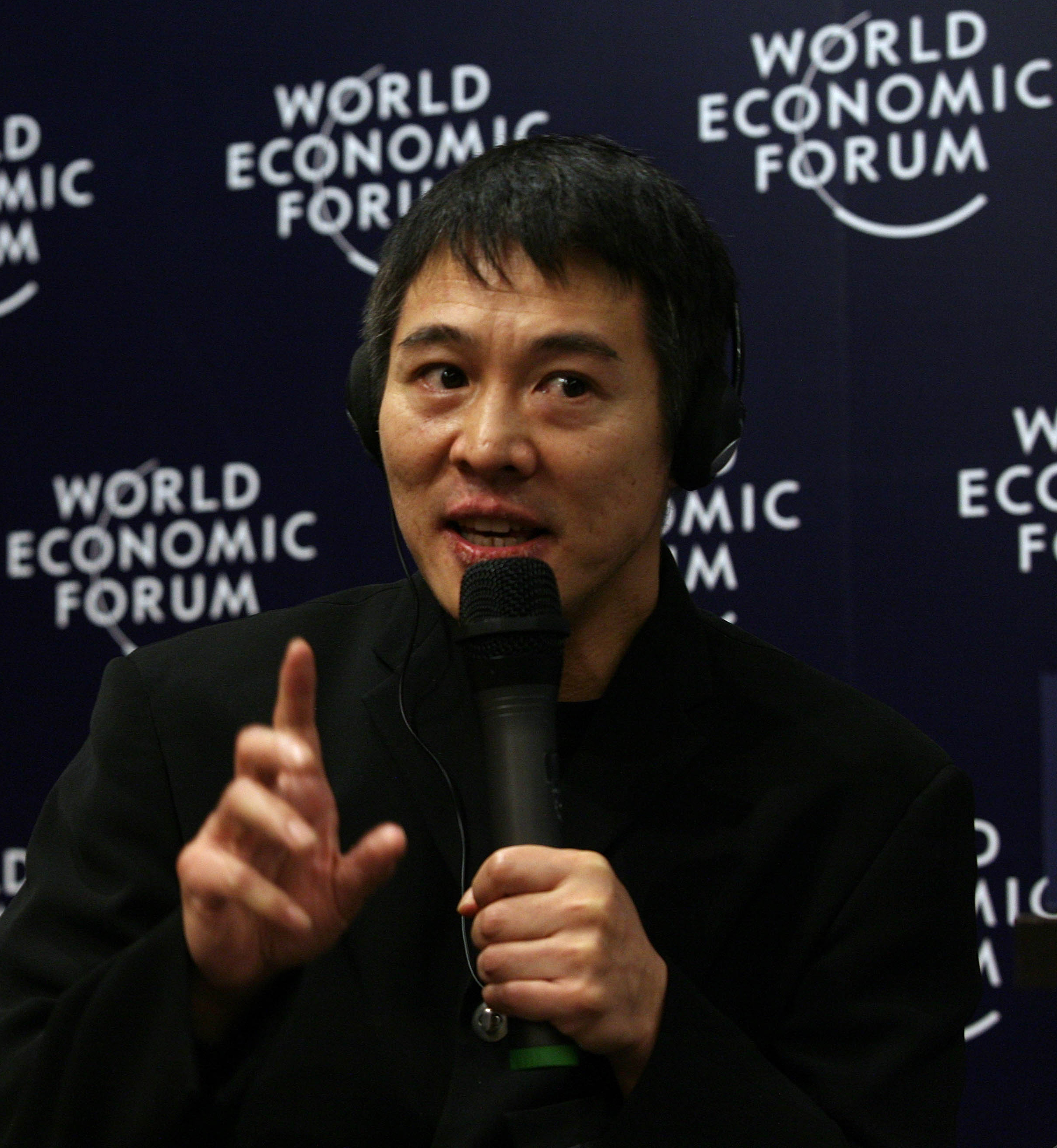
Li speaks at the World Economic Forum in Tianjin, China, September 2008

Li has been a "philanthropic ambassador" of the Red Cross Society of China since January 2006. He contributed 500,000 yuan (US$62,500) of box office revenues from his film Fearless to the Red Cross' psychological sunshine project, which promotes mental health.

In April 2007, touched by his life-shaking experience in the Maldives when he was close to dying during the 2004 tsunami, Li formed his own non-profit foundation called One Foundation. The One Foundation supports international disaster relief efforts in conjunction with the Red Cross as well as other efforts, including mental health awareness and suicide prevention. Since the starting of the foundation, Li has been involved with recovery efforts in seven disasters, including the 2008 Sichuan earthquake and Typhoon Morakot in Taiwan. In the 2013 Lushan earthquake in Ya'an, Sichuan, Li and other members of the entertainment sector were the first to appeal for donations of money, goods and materials to help the victims of the disaster. Wu Jing was a One Foundation volunteer and helped in the effort.

Li discussed his commitment to philanthropy in an interview with the December 2009 issue of Alliance magazine, stating that "grassroots non-government organizations can help the government in its blind spots. Government relief is not always detail-oriented. Grassroots NGOs can't be as big as a government effort, but they need to be flexible and independent."

In September 2010, he was appointed by the International Red Cross as the first Good Will Ambassador. He posted online, saying:

"Today I signed a deal with the International Federation of Red Cross and Red Crescent Societies – IFRC – to become the FIRST goodwill ambassador in the history of this humanitarian organization. I am very honored! At the same time, I will not pause to celebrate, but instead keep pushing forward and do my best to help the world! Thank you all once again for your support and belief in me!"

It was also announced in September 2010, when Li was attending his wax unveiling ceremony in Hong Kong Madame Tussauds, that Li would be meeting Bill Gates and Warren Buffett to talk about charity work. "Three days ago, I received an email from Gates, hoping I could make time because he and Buffett hoped I could go for a 30-minute chat before the dinner about the future we face as human beings, so I will go," Li said.

== Filmography ==
By US box office statistics, the most successful Jet Li film as of August 2010 is Lethal Weapon 4, which grossed over $130 million domestically, while the second is The Expendables with over $103 million. Hero is the third most successful foreign language film in the US, and one of the most critically acclaimed Li movies. Fearless is the seventh most successful foreign language film of all time in the US. From an aggregated critical point of view, the best acclaimed Li movie is Fist of Legend (Rotten Tomatoes: 100%) and the worst is The One (Rotten Tomatoes: 13%).

== Awards and nominations ==
Year	Award	Category	Film	Result
1995	Golden Horse Film Festival	Special Award	—N/a	Won
1999	MTV Movie Awards	Best Villain	Lethal Weapon 4	Nominated
2001	MTV Movie Awards	Best Fight	Romeo Must Die	Nominated
2002	MTV Movie Awards	Best Fight	The One	Nominated
2003	MTV Movie Awards	Best Fight	Cradle 2 the Grave	Nominated
2006	Hundred Flowers Awards	Best Actor	Fearless	Nominated
2007	Hong Kong Film Critics Society Awards	Best Actor	Fearless	Won
2007	Hong Kong Film Awards	Best Actor	Fearless	Nominated
2008	Hong Kong Film Awards	Best Actor	The Warlords	Won
2008	Shanghai Film Critics Awards	Best Actor	The Warlords	Won
2008	Asian Film Awards	Best Actor	The Warlords	Nominated
2008	Hundred Flowers Awards	Best Actor	The Warlords	Nominated

== See also ==
- Cinema of China
- Cinema of Hong Kong
