= Impact of the COVID-19 pandemic on combat sports =

The COVID-19 pandemic has caused a significant disruption to different combat sports, particularly during the years of 2020 into 2021.

== Mixed martial arts ==
ONE Championship moved its 28 February "King of the Jungle" event behind closed doors, and announced that its ONE Infinity 1 event on 10 April would move from Chongqing, China to Jakarta, Indonesia. On 13 March, ONE announced that all cards would be held behind closed doors in Singapore until ONE Infinity 1 on 29 May, re-located to Manila, Philippines (which was originally to host ONE Infinity 2). The ONE Championship "Heart of Heroes" event in Vietnam (originally scheduled for 20 March) was postponed to June. On 6 April, due to lockdown orders issued by the Singapore government that restrict non-essential business, ONE announced that the two April cards would be postponed.

On 9 March, Combate Americas announced that its March events would be cancelled and replaced by closed-door tapings beginning 3 April. On 10 March, Polish MMA promotion Konfrontacja Sztuk Walki (KSW) cancelled its 21 March 2020 event KSW 53 in Łódź. On 13 March, Bellator canceled Bellator 241 in Uncasville, Connecticut (which was scheduled to occur later that day), and has since canceled all events through May.

=== Ultimate Fighting Championship ===
The main North American promotion UFC went on with its 13 March event UFC Fight Night: Lee vs. Oliveira in Brasília, Brazil, behind closed doors. On 16 March, UFC announced that the next three UFC Fight Night events, Overeem vs. Harris, Ngannou vs. Rozenstruik, and Woodley vs. Edwards, would be postponed to future dates.

In regards to its next pay-per-view, UFC 249 on 18 April, UFC president Dana White stated that the event would likely go on, but at a new venue behind closed doors. It was originally to be held at New York City's Barclays Center, but a stay-at-home order was issued by the New York state government. On 18 March, the New York State Athletic Commission also withdrew its sanctioning for the event. Due to international travel restrictions and other withdrawals, a revised card for UFC 249 was unveiled 6 April with a location still being determined. On 7 April, White disclosed that he had booked an unspecified venue for two months, in order to host both UFC 249 and other future events involving U.S. fighters. He also disclosed plans to secure a "private island" to host events with international fighters.

The new UFC 249 venue was subsequently revealed to be Tachi Palace—a tribal casino in Lemoore, California; as it is on tribal land, it also fell outside of the jurisdiction of the California State Athletic Commission, meaning that events held there could be self-sanctioned. On 9 April, UFC announced that UFC 249 had been canceled, and all other UFC events would be suspended until further notice. White cited interventions from high-ranking staff of the UFC's U.S. media rightsholders, ESPN Inc. and parent The Walt Disney Company. Despite the cancellation, White stated that he was still going on with his "Fight Island" project.

The UFC later announced on 24 April that it would resume its events with a series of three cards held behind closed doors at the VyStar Veterans Memorial Arena in Jacksonville, Florida, beginning with UFC 249 on 9 May, along with two other cards on 13 May (UFC Fight Night: Smith vs. Teixeira) and 16 May (UFC on ESPN: Overeem vs. Harris). Florida had recently exempted sporting events held behind closed doors for a national audience from its stay-at-home order. White also announced a planned card at an undetermined location on 23 May, and plans to begin events at his "Fight Island" in June. The Nevada Athletic Commission approved the hosting of UFC on ESPN: Woodley vs. Burns on 30 May, and UFC 250 on 6 June, both at the company's UFC Apex studios in Las Vegas.

On 9 June, White revealed that "Fight Island" was a bio-secure bubble on Yas Island in Abu Dhabi, United Arab Emirates, which hosted UFC 251 on 11 July, and three other UFC Fight Night cards through the remainder of the month. In this bubble, all participants and staff were required to test negative for SARS-CoV-2 multiple times before traveling to or entering the bubble, and individuals entering the arena were required to go through disinfecting "mist tunnels". A second series of events on Yas Island was held in late-September and October 2020, featuring UFC 253, three Fight Night cards, and UFC 254. A third series of Fight Island events was held in January 2021; this time, the events were held with a limited in-person attendance at the newly opened Etihad Arena—UFC's first events to do so since the pandemic began.

The first U.S.-based UFC event with spectators was UFC 261 in April 2021, at VyStar Veterans Memorial Arena. The event was held without capacity limits, and stated to be the first U.S. indoor sporting event to do so. While numbered UFC events in have since been held in other states with loosened restrictions, such as Arizona and Texas, White stated in May 2021 that his preference was to only host major UFC events in areas that have lifted restrictions on arena capacity for indoor sporting events, and that lower-profile Fight Night cards would continue to be held at UFC Apex for the time being.

== Kickboxing ==
Kunlun Fight cancelled multiple events.

Glory cancelled events in Lint, Belgium and Miami, Florida.

== Professional wrestling ==
Numerous promotions canceled major events, such as Impact Wrestling's TNA: There's No Place Like Home, Ring of Honor's 18th Anniversary Show, and the National Wrestling Alliance's Crockett Cup in the United States. Impact, ROH, and NWA also cancelled future tapings for their respective weekly television shows until further notice. In Mexico, Consejo Mundial de Lucha Libre cancelled tapings for their weekly shows for the foreseeable future and Lucha Libre AAA Worldwide postponed the 2020 Rey de Reyes event.

=== New Japan Pro-Wrestling ===
In accordance with recommendations from the Japanese Ministry of Health, New Japan Pro-Wrestling (NJPW) decided to cancel all scheduled shows from 1 March through 15 March. On 10 March, NJPW announced that they were cancelling all shows through 22 March, and postponed most notably the 2020 New Japan Cup. The Stardom promotion, sister company of NJPW also owned by Bushiroad, also made adjustments to their scheduled, cancelling shows from 19 February to 14 March. Their show of 8 March in Korakuen Hall was held without any spectators in attendance, instead streaming live on their YouTube channel. On 23 March, NJPW would later cancel the 2020 Sakura Genesis event that was originally scheduled to take place on 31 March. On 8 April, NJPW would cancel more events from 11 April through 4 May, including the entire Wrestling Dontaku, which was not rescheduled. On 6 May, NJPW cancelled their annual Best of the Super Juniors tournament. The next day, NJPW postponed their Wrestle Dynasty event to 2021, which was to take place in Madison Square Garden in New York. On 9 June, NJPW announced their return with special show with a mystery match card called Together Special on 15 June and the rescheduled New Japan Cup would now be held from 16 June until 11 July, with the finals being held at Osaka-jō Hall in Osaka alongside Dominion in Osaka-jo Hall being rescheduled to 12 July 2020.

=== WWE ===
American promotion WWE began to move the broadcasts of its weekly programs SmackDown and Raw (which usually broadcast from arenas) behind closed doors to its Orlando training facility, the WWE Performance Center, beginning with SmackDown on March 13, completely absent of an audience and only essential staff in attendance. Due to the awkward silence of the dead venue, wrestling matches were heavily narrative during this era with the combatants vocalizing their storyline thoughts and engaged in excessive trash talk among one another. The promotion also cancelled or postponed many of its previously scheduled house shows during this era.

WrestleMania 36—WWE's flagship pay-per-view event—was originally scheduled to be held at Raymond James Stadium in Tampa. On 16 March, WWE announced that it would also be produced from the Performance Center and air across two nights (4 and 5 April). WrestleMania Weekend's associated events, such as the NXT TakeOver: Tampa Bay card (which was scheduled for Amalie Arena) and WWE Hall of Fame induction ceremony were also postponed to unannounced dates, though TakeOver was ultimately canceled with its planned matches moved to weekly episodes of NXT. Matches for WrestleMania, as well as the final two episodes of SmackDown and final episode of Raw before WrestleMania, were recorded in advance at the Performance Center between 21 and 26 March. While the majority of matches were filmed in the Performance Center arena and presented plausibly live, two matches were filmed off-site in different, cinematic styles.

After continuing with pre-taped episodes for the go-home shows after WrestleMania, WWE announced that its weekly series would resume live broadcasts on 13 April, with Raw and SmackDown from the Performance Center as before, and NXT taped from its existing studio at Full Sail University in Winter Park. WWE told ESPN that "it is now more important than ever to provide people with a diversion from these hard times", and that its programming "bring[s] families together and deliver a sense of hope, determination and perseverance". WWE also confirmed that one of its employees had contracted COVID-19 after a meeting with two health care workers on 26 March, but that the exposure occurred after production had wrapped; the employee had not made any contact with WWE staff since and they made a complete recovery. Wrestling journalists Dave Meltzer noted that WWE's television contracts with Fox and USA Network likely restricted the number of non-live episodes it could broadcast per-year (accommodating breaks in live broadcasts usually held around the Christmas and New Year holidays).

WWE's next PPV, Money in the Bank, was expected to be held at Baltimore's Royal Farms Arena in May, but was canceled by the arena on 9 April. On 17 April, WWE announced that the show's eponymous Money in the Bank matches (where wrestlers compete to retrieve a briefcase suspended above the ring with a ladder, containing a contract granting rights to challenge one of WWE's world championships at any point within the next year) would take place at its world headquarters building in Stamford, Connecticut, with a new "corporate ladder" gimmick where the briefcases would be suspended above a ring on the building's roof; the wrestlers began on the ground floor of the building and fought their way to the roof. The rest of the event occurred live at the Performance Center.

On 9 April, Florida's Division of Emergency Management added an exemption to the state stay-at-home order for employees of a "professional sports and media production with a national audience", if closed to the general public. On 13 April, Mayor of Orange County, Florida Jerry Demings acknowledged the change during a news conference, stating that they were made following consultations with the office of Governor of Florida Ron DeSantis, and that they would allow WWE to continue its operations. It was reported that WWE had received repeated warnings by state officials over the stay-at-home order, but that DeSantis considered the operation critical to the state economy, and accommodated them by allowing the aforementioned changes.

DeSantis acknowledged the changes the next day, explaining that viewers were "starved" for sports content, and that the new exception could also be theoretically used by other sporting events. The same day, U.S. president Donald Trump announced that he was forming an economic advisory group to address the country's emergence and "reopening" from the pandemic; WWE owner and chairman Vince McMahon was named to the group (alongside other major sports commissioners and team owners). McMahon has been an ally of Trump, who has also made appearances on WWE programming in the past, and is also a member of the celebrity wing of the company's Hall of Fame.

On 28 August, WWE moved its weekly Raw and SmackDown shows, as well as pay-per-views, to Orlando's Amway Center. The centerpiece of the new setup is "ThunderDome," an in-arena staging incorporating a virtual audience and larger-scale arena show. In October 2020, NXT re-located to the Performance Center from Full Sail University, using a remodeled main arena dubbed the "Capitol Wrestling Center", which features a virtual audience and limited in-person attendance. On 11 December, the ThunderDome set was relocated to Tropicana Field in St. Petersburg, Florida, as WWE vacated Amway Center to make room for its professional sports tenants.

On 16 January 2021, WWE announced that WrestleMania 37 would be re-located from SoFi Stadium in Inglewood, California to Raymond James Stadium as a two-night event, as compensation for the previous year's changes, with SoFi Stadium given WrestleMania 39 in 2023 instead. Attendance for WrestleMania 37 was capped at 25,000 per-night. After the event, WWE returned to closed tapings, with the ThunderDome set re-located once more to Tampa's Yuengling Center, on the campus of the University of South Florida.

On 21 May, WWE announced that it would return to in-person touring shows in mid-July, with SmackDown, the Money in the Bank pay-per-view, and Raw to be held in Houston, Fort Worth, and Dallas on 16, 18, and 19 July respectively.

=== All Elite Wrestling ===
On 12 March, All Elite Wrestling (AEW) announced the relocation of its two remaining live broadcasts of Dynamite on TNT for the month of March, scheduled for Rochester, New York and Newark, New Jersey respectively (with the latter originally scheduled to feature AEW's "Blood and Guts" event, also indefinitely postponed), to an alternative location with no audience. AEW stated that it had re-booked the two cities for future episodes in July. AEW subsequently cancelled on-location Dynamite broadcasts through at least 13 May.

Beginning on 15 March, AEW began to originate Dynamite from a closed stage at TIAA Bank Field's Daily's Place amphitheater in Jacksonville, Florida. Beginning with 1 April episode, Dynamite moved to an undisclosed location to prevent fans from attempting to interact with the wrestlers; the location was later reported to be in Norcross, Georgia. On 3 April, after a state-wide stay-at-home order was issued, it was reported that AEW had also pre-recorded content for Dynamite on 1 and 2 April, and that they had amassed enough content "for weeks if not months if necessary."

AEW's next pay-per-view event, Double or Nothing, was originally scheduled to take place at the MGM Grand Garden Arena in Paradise, Nevada on 23 May. The venue, however, canceled all events up through 31 May due to the pandemic. The event was subsequently moved to Daily's Place (with nearby TIAA Bank Field hosting a deliberate empty arena "Stadium Stampede" match). On 27 August, AEW began to hold events with spectators, again at Daily's Place. These events were to be ticketed and carry between 10%-15% capacity.

== Sumo ==
Despite the March tournament in Osaka taking place behind closed doors without a hitch, bar one wrestler (Chiyomaru) having temporarily withdrawn from the tournament with a fever whilst undergoing tests; both the Tokyo tournament in May and the Nagoya tournament in July were initially postponed by two weeks on 4 April. The July tournament had been previously moved forward a week to avoid conflict with the 2020 Olympics in Tokyo, which have since been postponed a year.

A week later, the Japan Sumo Association confirmed the sport's first case when an undisclosed wrestler in the lower ranks, was tested positive after developing a fever some six days earlier. This led to all wrestlers and officials being ordered to stay indoor until further notice.

Following the extension of Japan's national state of emergency until 31 May, the Sumo Association officially cancelled the 2020 May tournament on 4 May. It was the second cancellation of a tournament since 1946, and the first since March 2011 amidst a match-fixing scandal.

Several wrestlers who caught the virus, Sandanme 11 wrestler Shobushi of Takadagawa stable was later confirmed to be the first one tested positive for COVID-19, who died from multiple organ failure on 13 May. In January 2021, yokozuna Hakuhō tested positive for COVID-19.

The July 2020 tournament, originally to be held in Nagoya, was moved to Tokyo and began on 19 July, with a maximum of 2,500 spectators per day allowed, about a quarter of the Ryōgoku Kokugikan's 11,000 capacity to reduce unnecessary travel across the Japanese countryside. In subsequent months, the tournaments in November 2020 and March 2021 were originally to be held in Fukuoka and Osaka, respectively. In both considerations, all tournaments remained in Tokyo with an increase of 5,000 spectators per day were allowed.

On 23 April 2021, the Sumo Association announced the May tournament would take place behind closed doors for the first three days of the competition following Japan's fourth wave of increasing virus cases and extending state of emergency in the Greater Tokyo Area.

The July 2022 tournament went ahead with no limits on spectators for the first time since the beginning of the pandemic. However, the tournament was badly hit by withdrawal of wrestlers, as the Sumo Association demands an entire stable quarantine if one wrestler there tests positive. By Day 13, eleven of sumo's 43 stables had been affected, with 158 wrestlers in total forced to withdraw. This included thirteen elite sekitori ranked wrestlers.

== General issues ==
An October 2020 story by ESPN journalist Marc Raimondi made the case that combat sports face long-lasting negative effects from the pandemic. While many top-flight competitions and promotions have returned to operation, Raimondi pointed out,

The coronavirus pandemic has ravaged the regional and local scenes in combat sports, doing untold damage to the long-term future of MMA, boxing and professional wrestling. The next Floyd Mayweather or Conor McGregor has probably not fought in 2020. Many athletes cannot even train with consistency due to gym closures. The combat-sports pipeline -- from amateur to prospect to contender to superstar -- has cracked, and stakeholders aren't sure how or when it will be fully repaired.

The Tapology website, which tracks MMA fights worldwide, reported that the worldwide number of sanctioned MMA fights dropped by over 80% from 2019 to 2020, as measured from 1 March to 1 September of each year. The U.S. saw an even greater drop in total fights during that time frame. During the March–September 2019 period, Zuffa, the parent company of UFC, accounted for 4.4% of U.S. MMA fights. The company was responsible for more than 20% of U.S. MMA fights during the same period in 2020—despite only running one event in the country in March, April, or July. Boxing also saw slightly less dramatic declines in the same period; the BoxRec website reported a drop in total bouts of over 65% worldwide and over 55% in the U.S.

== See also ==
- Impact of the COVID-19 pandemic on sports
