= 2008 Beijing Wushu Tournament – Men's jianshu and qiangshu =

Men's jianshu and qiangshu at the 2008 Beijing Wushu Tournament
- Venue: Olympic Sports Center Gymnasium
- Dates: 23 August
- Competitors: 10 from 10 nations

Medalists
gold medal	Liu Yang	Hong Kong
silver medal	Lim Yew Fai	Malaysia
bronze medal	Nguyễn Huy Thành	Vietnam

The men's jianshu / qiangshu all-around competition at the 2008 Beijing Wushu Tournament was held on August 23 at the Olympic Sports Center Gymnasium.

== Background ==
Liu Yang, Lim Yew Lai, and Nguyễn Huy Thành were the projected favorites for the competition, as they were the top-three placing athletes in the combined score ranking at the 2007 World Wushu Championships. Another favorite was Gogi Nebulana as he won the gold medal in jianshu at the 2007 world championships, but was ranked fifth in the combined score rankings. Gold medalist in qiangshu, Hei Zhi Hong, would have been another favorite, but he opted to compete in the men's taijiquan event.

At the Beijing Wushu Tournament, the final rankings were nearly identical to the results at the 2007 world championships.

== Schedule ==
All times are Beijing Time (UTC+08:00)

Date	Time	Event
Saturday, 23 August, 2008	9:57	Qiangshu
Saturday, 23 August, 2008	19:30	Jianshu

== Results ==
Both events were judged without the degree of difficulty component.

Rank	Athlete	Qiangshu	Jianshu	Total
1st place, gold medalist(s)	Liu Yang (HKG)	9.70	9.70	19.40
2nd place, silver medalist(s)	Lim Yew Fai (MAS)	9.66	9.66	19.32
3rd place, bronze medalist(s)	Nguyễn Huy Thành (VIE)	9.66	9.65	19.31
4	Gogi Nebulana (INA)	9.61	9.55	19.16
5	Colvin Wang (USA)	9.52	9.54	19.06
6	Richard Devine (GBR)	9.58	9.44	19.02
7	Kweon Heung-Seok (KOR)	9.46	9.51	18.97
8	Raul Estevez (ESP)	9.19	9.48	18.67
9	Pierre Rouviere (FRA)	9.21	9.32	18.53
10	Bryan Adam Son (RSA)	8.64	8.97	17.61
