= UFC Fight Night: Hermansson vs. Weidman =

UFC mixed martial arts event in 2020

- Promotion: Ultimate Fighting Championship
- Date: May 2, 2020 (cancelled)
- Venue: Chesapeake Energy Arena
- City: Oklahoma City, Oklahoma, United States

Event chronology
UFC Fight Night: Smith vs. Teixeira	UFC Fight Night: Hermansson vs. Weidman	UFC 249: Ferguson vs. Gaethje

UFC Fight Night: Hermansson vs. Weidman was a planned mixed martial arts event produced by the Ultimate Fighting Championship originally planned to take place on May 2, 2020, at Chesapeake Energy Arena in Oklahoma City, Oklahoma, United States. Due to the COVID-19 pandemic in Oklahoma, UFC president Dana White announced on April 9 that starting with UFC 249, all future events were indefinitely postponed. The event was officially cancelled on April 20.

== Background ==
The event would be the third that the promotion has contested in Oklahoma City, following UFC Fight Night: Diaz vs. Guillard in September 2009 and UFC Fight Night: Chiesa vs. Lee in June 2017.

A middleweight bout between former UFC Middleweight Champion Chris Weidman and Jack Hermansson had been slated to serve as the event headliner.

A women's bantamweight bout between Sarah Alpar and Duda Santana was scheduled for the event. However, Santana was removed from the event for undisclosed reasons and replaced by Vanessa Melo.

A women's bantamweight bout between Julia Avila and Karol Rosa was expected to take place at UFC Fight Night: Overeem vs. Harris. However, the event was cancelled due to the COVID-19 pandemic. The pairing was rescheduled for this event.

Due to travel restrictions related to the COVID-19 pandemic, some Brazilian fighters were unable to compete due to visa issues on the original date – Marina Rodriguez (who was expected to face former UFC Women's Strawweight Championship challenger Cláudia Gadelha) and Vanessa Melo (who was expected to replace Santana against Alpar).

== Cancelled fight card ==
Fight card
Weight class				Method	Round	Time	Notes
Middleweight	Jack Hermansson	vs.	Chris Weidman
Heavyweight	Andrei Arlovski	vs.	Philipe Lins				(Note: Moved to the new UFC Fight Night: Smith vs. Teixeira.)
Featherweight	Bryce Mitchell	vs.	Charles Rosa				(Note: Moved to UFC 249.)
Light Heavyweight	Alonzo Menifield	vs.	Devin Clark				(Note: Moved to UFC 250.)
Light Heavyweight	Ed Herman	vs.	Jung Da Un				(Note: Moved to UFC Fight Night: Brunson vs. Shahbazyan.)
Featherweight	Ryan Hall	vs.	Ricardo Lamas				(Note: Moved to UFC Fight Night: Smith vs. Rakić.)
Lightweight	Carlos Diego Ferreira	vs.	Drew Dober				(Note: Dober later booked to face Alexander Hernandez at the new UFC Fight Night: Smith vs. Teixeira.)
Featherweight	Edson Barboza	vs.	Josh Emmett				(Note: Barboza later booked to face Dan Ige at UFC on ESPN: Overeem vs. Harris.)
Women's Bantamweight	Julia Avila	vs.	Karol Rosa				(Note: Moved to UFC Fight Night: Eye vs. Calvillo.)

== See also ==
- List of UFC events
- List of current UFC fighters
- 2020 in UFC
