= UFC Fight Night: Overeem vs. Harris =

UFC mixed martial arts cancelled event in 2020

- The poster for UFC Fight Night: Overeem vs. Harris
- Promotion: Ultimate Fighting Championship
- Date: April 11, 2020 (cancelled)
- Venue: Moda Center
- City: Portland, Oregon, United States

Event chronology
UFC on ESPN: Ngannou vs. Rozenstruik	UFC Fight Night: Overeem vs. Harris	UFC Fight Night: Smith vs. Teixeira

UFC Fight Night: Overeem vs. Harris was a planned mixed martial arts event produced by the Ultimate Fighting Championship originally planned to take place on April 11, 2020 at Moda Center in Portland, Oregon, United States. Due to the COVID-19 pandemic, the event was eventually postponed.

== Background ==
The event was expected to be the third that the organization hosted in Portland, following UFC 102 in August 2009 and UFC Fight Night: Lineker vs. Dodson in October 2016.

A heavyweight bout between the former 2010 K-1 World Grand Prix Champion, Strikeforce Heavyweight Champion and UFC Heavyweight Championship challenger Alistair Overeem and Walt Harris was expected to serve as the event headliner. The pairing had previously been scheduled to headline UFC on ESPN: Overeem vs. Rozenstruik on December 7, 2019 but Harris pulled out of the fight in early November, citing the disappearance and death of his stepdaughter in her home state of Alabama.

A middleweight bout between Abu Azaitar and Alessio Di Chirico was scheduled for the event. However, Azaitar was pulled from the event for an undisclosed reason and replaced by Markus Perez.

A middleweight bout between Derek Brunson and Edmen Shahbazyan was initially scheduled for UFC 248. However, it was announced on February 20 that the bout had been rescheduled and would serve as the co-headliner for this event.

=== COVID-19 pandemic ===
Due to the COVID-19 pandemic, Oregon governor Kate Brown issued an order restricting mass gatherings and sporting events on March 12, thus the UFC decided to move the event to Las Vegas where it would take place behind closed doors at the UFC APEX facility. UFC president Dana White then announced on March 15 that this event would have to be moved once again as the Nevada State Athletic Commission (NSAC) decided to provisionally ban events until March 25, when a new meeting would discuss future plans in what could jeopardize this event's realization. On March 16, it was confirmed that the event was postponed after a letter from White to employees was shared with the public. This was the first time that the promotion was forced to cancel events due to vis major. The UFC also cancelled two events scheduled for March 21 and 28. White assured on March 24 that all cancelled fights will be rescheduled for future events.

== Cancelled fight card ==
Fight card
Weight class				Method	Round	Time	Notes
Heavyweight	Alistair Overeem	vs.	Walt Harris				(Note: Moved to UFC on ESPN: Overeem vs. Harris.)
Middleweight	Derek Brunson	vs.	Edmen Shahbazyan				(Note: Moved to UFC Fight Night: Brunson vs. Shahbazyan.)
Women's Strawweight	Carla Esparza	vs.	Michelle Waterson				(Note: Moved to UFC 249.)
Welterweight	Vicente Luque	vs.	Randy Brown				(Note: Luque later booked to face Niko Price at UFC 249.)
Middleweight	Eryk Anders	vs.	Krzysztof Jotko				(Note: Moved to UFC on ESPN: Overeem vs. Harris.)
Middleweight	Markus Perez	vs.	Alessio Di Chirico
Welterweight	Niko Price	vs.	Muslim Salikhov				(Note: Price later booked to face Vicente Luque at UFC 249.)
Lightweight	Tristan Connelly	vs.	Alex da Silva Coelho
Welterweight	Cole Williams	vs.	Philip Rowe
Women's Bantamweight	Julia Avila	vs.	Karol Rosa				(Note: Moved to UFC Fight Night: Hermansson vs. Weidman.)
Heavyweight	Don'Tale Mayes	vs.	Rodrigo Nascimento				(Note: Moved to UFC Fight Night: Smith vs. Teixeira.)
Lightweight	Davi Ramos	vs.	Arman Tsarukyan				(Note: Moved to UFC Fight Night: Figueiredo vs. Benavidez 2.)

== See also ==
- List of UFC events
- List of current UFC fighters
- 2020 in Oregon
- 2020 in UFC
