= UFC Fight Night: Woodley vs. Edwards =

UFC mixed martial arts event in 2020

- The poster for UFC Fight Night: Woodley vs. Edwards
- Promotion: Ultimate Fighting Championship
- Date: March 21, 2020 (cancelled)
- Venue: The O2 Arena
- City: London, England

Event chronology
UFC Fight Night: Lee vs. Oliveira	UFC Fight Night: Woodley vs. Edwards	UFC on ESPN: Ngannou vs. Rozenstruik

UFC Fight Night: Woodley vs. Edwards was a planned mixed martial arts event produced by the Ultimate Fighting Championship originally planned to take place on March 21, 2020, at The O2 Arena in London, England. Due to the COVID-19 pandemic, the event was eventually postponed (see section below).

== Background ==
The event was originally expected to take place at The O2 Arena in London, England. However, due to the COVID-19 pandemic causing a travel ban in the United Kingdom, UFC president Dana White announced on March 15 that the event would have to move to a new location to be decided and some of the fights scheduled might be affected.

A welterweight bout between former UFC Welterweight Champion Tyron Woodley and Leon Edwards was expected to serve as the event headliner. However, Edwards pulled out on March 15 due to the cancellation of the event in London.

While not officially announced by the organization, a lightweight bout between Stevie Ray and Marc Diakiese was expected to take place at the event. However, Ray was removed from the card in late January for undisclosed reasons. Diakiese was expected to remain on the card against promotional newcomer Jai Herbert.

A heavyweight bout between Raphael Pessoa and Tom Aspinall was scheduled for the event. However, Pessoa was replaced by Jake Collier for an undisclosed reason.

=== COVID-19 pandemic ===
After the event was pulled from London, UFC president Dana White announced that the plan was to move the card somewhere stateside. That prompted cancellations in several bouts expected to take place at this event, including the main event. Cage Warriors (a mixed martial arts promotion based in London) president Graham Boylan indicated that he would like to help some of these bouts to happen in his promotion's event scheduled for March 20. On March 16, it was confirmed that the event was postponed after a letter from White to employees was shared to the public. This was the first time that the promotion was forced to cancel events due to vis major. The UFC also cancelled two events scheduled for March 28 and April 11. White assured on March 24 that all cancelled fights would be rescheduled for future events. It was announced on April 1 that all fighters that were scheduled to appear at the event would be paid.

== Cancelled fight card ==
Fight card
Weight class				Method	Round	Time	Notes
Welterweight	Tyron Woodley	vs.	Leon Edwards
Welterweight	Danny Roberts	vs.	Nicolas Dalby				(Note: Moved to UFC Fight Night: Whittaker vs. Till)
Middleweight	Jack Marshman	vs.	Kevin Holland				(Note: Holland later booked to face Anthony Hernandez at UFC on ESPN: Overeem vs. Harris.)
Middleweight	Darren Stewart	vs.	Marvin Vettori				(Note: Stewart faced Bartosz Fabiński at Cage Warriors 113. Vettori later booked to face Karl Roberson at UFC Fight Night: Smith vs. Teixeira.)
Bantamweight	Jack Shore	vs.	Geraldo de Freitas
Lightweight	Marc Diakiese	vs.	Jai Herbert
Light Heavyweight	Paul Craig	vs.	Ryan Spann				(Note: Spann later booked to face Sam Alvey at UFC 249.)
Featherweight	Lerone Murphy	vs.	Gabriel Benítez
Women's Flyweight	Molly McCann	vs.	Ashlee Evans-Smith
Featherweight	Mike Grundy	vs.	Makwan Amirkhani
Middleweight	John Phillips	vs.	Duško Todorović				(Note: Moved to Cage Warriors 113. Later cancelled as travel restrictions in the region affected Todorović.)
Heavyweight	Tom Aspinall	vs.	Jake Collier
Welterweight	Bartosz Fabiński	vs.	Shavkat Rakhmonov				(Note: Fabiński faced Darren Stewart at Cage Warriors 113.)

== See also ==
- List of UFC events
- List of current UFC fighters
- 2020 in UFC
