= 2008 Beijing Wushu Tournament – Men's sanshou 70 kg =

Men's sanshou 70 kg at the 2008 Beijing Wushu Tournament
- Venue: Olympic Sports Center Gymnasium
- Dates: 22-24 August
- Competitors: 8 from 8 nations

Medalists
gold medal	Cai Liang Chan	Macau
silver medal	Murad Akhadov	Russia
bronze medal	Ahmad Ibrahim	Egypt
bronze medal	Yoon Soon-Myung	South Korea

The men's sanshou 70 kilograms competition at the 2008 Beijing Wushu Tournament was held from 22 to 24 August at the Olympic Sports Center Gymnasium.

== Schedule ==
All times are Beijing Time (UTC+08:00)

Date	Time	Event
Thursday, 21 August 2008	15:54	Quarterfinals
Saturday, 23 August 2008	16:04	Semifinals
Sunday, 24 August 2008	10:35	Final

== Results ==
Quarterfinals
Cai Liang Chan (MAC)	2
Traian Augustin (ROU)	0
Harutyun Simonyan (ARM)	0
Ahmad Ibrahim (EGY)	2
Murad Akhadov (RUS)	2
Kazuari Sasazawa (JPN)	0
Maximillion Chen (USA)	0
Yoon Soon-Myung (KOR)	2

Semifinals
Cai Liang Chan (MAC)	2
Ahmad Ibrahim (EGY)	0
Murad Akhadov (RUS)	2
Yoon Soon-Myung (KOR)	0

Final
Cai Liang Chan (MAC)	2
Murad Akhadov (RUS)	0
