= Wushu at the 2006 Asian Games – Men's taijiquan combined =

Men's taijiquan combined at the 2006 Asian Games
- Venue: Aspire Hall 3
- Dates: 12–13 December 2006
- Competitors: 17 from 15 nations

Medalists
gold medal	Wu Yanan	China
silver medal	Hei Zhihong	Hong Kong
bronze medal	Goh Qiu Bin	Singapore

The men's taijiquan and taijijian events at the 2006 Asian Games in Doha, Qatar was held from 12 to 13 December at the Aspire Hall 3.

== Schedule ==
All times are Arabia Standard Time (UTC+03:00)

Date	Time	Event
Tuesday, 12 December 2006	09:00	Taijiquan
Wednesday, 13 December 2006	13:00	Taijijian

== Results ==
Legend

- DNS — Did not start

Rank	Athlete	Taijiquan	Taijijian	Total
1st place, gold medalist(s)	Wu Yanan (CHN)	9.87	9.85	19.72
2nd place, silver medalist(s)	Hei Zhihong (HKG)	9.63	9.63	19.26
3rd place, bronze medalist(s)	Goh Qiu Bin (SIN)	9.59	9.54	19.13
4	Myo Min Soe (MYA)	9.56	9.52	19.08
5	Eugene Yang (SIN)	9.50	9.54	19.04
6	Soe Win Thein (MYA)	9.46	9.56	19.02
7	Chang Ching-kuei (TPE)	9.40	9.54	18.94
8	Lee Yang (MAS)	9.17	9.60	18.77
9	Iao Chon In (MAC)	9.17	9.50	18.67
10	Yoshihiro Shimoda (JPN)	9.00	9.47	18.47
11	Jang Young-ho (KOR)	8.83	9.49	18.32
12	Avedis Seropian (LIB)	8.14	9.05	17.19
13	Sujith Manju Kumara (SRI)	7.25	9.00	16.25
14	Yevgeniy Kolokolnikov (KAZ)	7.10	8.62	15.72
15	Macha Ratna Maharjan (NEP)	5.60	8.70	14.30
16	Kenneth Lim (PHI)	DNS	DNS	0.00
16	Vijiendra Singh (IND)	DNS	DNS	0.00
