= Wushu at the 2010 Asian Games – Men's taijiquan & taijijian =

Men's taijiquan & taijijian at the 2010 Asian Games
- Venue: Nansha Gymnasium
- Dates: 16 November 2010
- Competitors: 19 from 16 nations

Medalists
gold medal	Wu Yanan	China
silver medal	Nguyễn Thanh Tùng	Vietnam
bronze medal	Hsiao Yung-jih	Chinese Taipei

The men's taijiquan and taijijian all-round competition at the 2010 Asian Games in Guangzhou, China was held on 16 November at the Nansha Gymnasium.

== Schedule ==
All times are China Standard Time (UTC+08:00)

Date	Time	Event
Tuesday, 16 November 2010	08:30	Taijijian
Tuesday, 16 November 2010	14:30	Taijiquan

== Results ==
Legend

- DNS — Did not start

Rank	Athlete	Taijijian	Taijiquan	Total
1st place, gold medalist(s)	Wu Yanan (CHN)	9.90	9.90	19.80
2nd place, silver medalist(s)	Nguyễn Thanh Tùng (VIE)	9.67	9.65	19.32
3rd place, bronze medalist(s)	Hsiao Yung-jih (TPE)	9.65	9.63	19.28
4	Chen Jun-chih (TPE)	9.63	9.64	19.27
5	Hei Zhihong (HKG)	9.62	9.64	19.26
6	Seet Wee Key (SIN)	9.62	9.63	19.25
7	Iao Chon In (MAC)	9.53	9.64	19.17
8	Jang Young-ho (KOR)	9.55	9.44	18.99
9	Jack Loh (MAS)	9.46	9.47	18.93
10	Lee Tze Yuan (SIN)	9.45	9.45	18.90
11	Lee Yang (MAS)	9.58	9.30	18.88
12	Yoshihiro Sekiya (JPN)	9.23	9.59	18.82
13	Nyein Chan Ko Ko (MYA)	9.47	9.26	18.73
14	Daniel Parantac (PHI)	9.26	9.15	18.41
15	Avedis Seropian (LIB)	8.00	9.05	17.05
16	Ang Babu Lama (NEP)	8.61	8.39	17.00
17	Yousef Al-Khudhari (YEM)	8.18	8.52	16.70
18	Gyandash Singh (IND)	8.27	8.10	16.37
19	Nazir Ahmad Khatibzada (AFG)	DNS	7.11	7.11
