= 2008 Beijing Wushu Tournament =

Wushu competition

Tournament details
- Country: China
- City: Beijing
- Venue: Olympic Sports Center Gymnasium
- Dates: August 21–24, 2008
- Participants: 128 (from 43 countries)

The 2008 Beijing Wushu Tournament (Chinese: 北京2008武术比赛; pinyin: Běijīng 2008 wǔshù bǐsài) was a wushu competition which was held from August 21 to 24, 2008 at the Olympic Sports Center Gymnasium in Beijing, China. The tournament was organised by the Beijing Organizing Committee for the Olympic Games (BOCOG), the International Wushu Federation (IWUF), and the Chinese Wushu Association (CWA), and was held in tandem with the 2008 Summer Olympics.

The competition consisted of ten taolu events (5 male, 5 female), and five sanshou events (3 male, 2 female). The Chinese team dominated the competition with eight gold medals followed by Russia and Hong Kong which earned two gold medals each. Macau, Iran and the Philippines each won a single gold.

== Background ==
Wushu's first Olympic appearance was at the 1936 Summer Olympics as an unofficial exhibition event.

Starting in the 1970s, the government of the People's Republic of China started to consider sport as a possible medium for friendly international exchange. One sport the PRC was very interested in developing was modern wushu. In 1982, the General Administration of Sport of China officially proclaimed that wushu practitioners had a duty 'to promote wushu to the world' with the ultimate goal of wushu becoming an official event at the Olympic Games.

The International Wushu Federation (IWUF) was founded 1990 Asian Games, and over a decade later, it was fully recognised by the International Olympic Committee during the 113th IOC Congress at the 2002 Winter Olympics. This development along with Beijing's successful bid in hosting the 2008 Olympics presented the opportunity for wushu to be included in the Games, but as Jacques Rogge became the new president of the IOC in 2002, he announced the IOC's plans to reduce the number of the events at the Games. This led to the creation of the Olympic Programme Commission which called for changes and reevaluations within the Olympic programme. Despite this, the Beijing Organising Committee for the Olympic Games (BOCOG), the IWUF, and the Chinese Wushu Association (CWA) began to lobby extensively for the official inclusion of wushu. Athletes and organisations argued that the inclusion of the sport would help culturally diversify the Games and hoped that wushu would follow the same Olympic path as judo and taekwondo.

In August 2002, the Olympic Programme Commission under Chairman Franco Carraro recommended to the IOC executive board that wushu should not be admitted to the 2008 Summer Olympics, and reasoned that it was not a sport of global appeal and that it would add no substantial value to the Games. Shortly after this meeting though, the IOC reversed their decision and stated that the sport of wushu was once again under consideration. In 2004, the Olympic Programme Commission introduced new evaluation criteria for Olympic sports to ensure the events would be fair and of high quality. As a result, the IWUF switched to computerised scoring and the International Rules for Taolu Competition were significantly revised. Sanshou rules stayed relatively the same besides switching to computerised scoring.

In 2005, IOC President Rogge met with the IWUF President and IOC executive board member Yu Zaiqing at the Chinese Grand Prix and announced that wushu will have no place in the Olympic Games in Beijing, not even as a demonstration sport. After meeting again a few weeks later at the 2005 National Games of China, all parties involved came to a compromise. Despite the IOC's rule that no international or national sports competition is allowed in the Olympic host city during or one week before or after the Games and also despite the ban on demonstration events since the 1992 Summer Olympics, the IOC specifically permitted the IWUF to organise a wushu tournament alongside the Olympic Games due to wushu's place in traditional Chinese culture. This collaboration was reaffirmed during a meeting at the 2006 World Traditional Wushu Championships, though the IOC did not specify if wushu had demonstration sport status, but referred to it as a 'representation sport.'

Other than substituting the Olympic rings with the logo of the IWUF, all other elements (e.g. medal design, award presentation & ceremony, graphic elements and colours, volunteers of the tournament, etc.) were identical to the Olympics. Athletes were also allowed to stay in the athletes' village though were only allowed to arrive only a few days before the tournament. The official BOCOG website also included the schedule, results, and profiles of the athletes. Day two of the competition was broadcast on China Central Television (CCTV) but other international channels provided live streaming for other days. The taolu and sanda events took place at the Olympic Sports Center Gymnasium, which was the site for the Handball competition at the 2008 Summer Olympics.

== Events ==
The Beijing Wushu Tournament borrowed the same combined-event format which was seen at wushu competitions such as the Asian Games, Southeast Asian Games, and the National Games of China. The events contested were:

- Changquan
- Daoshu and Gunshu combined
- Jianshu and Qiangshu combined
- Nanquan and Nangun combined (men only)
- Nanquan and Nandao combined (women only)
- Taijiquan and Taijijian combined
- Men's Sanshou: 56, 70, 85 kg
- Women's Sanshou: 52, 60 kg

=== Schedule ===
●	Round	●	Last round	R	Round of 16	¼	Quarterfinals	½	Semifinals	F	Final

Event↓/Date →	21st Thu	22nd Fri	23rd Sat	24th Sun
Men's changquan		●		
Men's daoshu and gunshu	●			
Men's jianshu and qiangshu			●	
Men's nanquan and nangun	●	●		
Men's taijiquan and taijijian		●	●	
Men's sanda 56 kg	R	¼	½	F
Men's sanda 70 kg		¼	½	F
Men's sanda 85 kg		¼	½	F
Women's changquan	●			
Women's daoshu and gunshu			●	
Women's nanquan and nandao	●	●		
Women's jianshu and qiangshu	●	●		
Women's taijiquan and taijijian		●	●	
Women's sanda 52 kg	R	¼	½	F
Women's sanda 60 kg		¼	½	F

== Qualification ==
128 athletes from 43 countries took part in the Beijing Wushu Tournament. National federations were not allowed to send more than eight taolu and sanshou athletes to the competition. Since China was the hosting nation, any of its athletes which competed at the 2007 world championships would qualify. Unlike the IOC, the IWUF recognises the Macau Olympic Committee and athletes representing Macau were allowed to compete in the competition.

=== Taolu ===
Besides the typical awarding of medals per each taolu event at the 2007 world championships, all athletes were ranked based on their combined scores from the proposed events at the Beijing Wushu Tournament (ie. daoshu and gunshu; jianshu and qiangshu; etc.). All athletes which ranked within the top six of a combined category or changquan (as ranking was done based only on the singular event) qualified for the Beijing Wushu Tournament. The IWUF then distributed 20 wild cards to various national federations to send more athletes. A national federation could enter only one athlete per each event and all athletes could compete in only one event.

As Chinese athletes at the 2007 world championships would automatically qualify for the Beijing Wushu Tournament, all of them opted not to participate in their second events after winning gold medals in their first events.

=== Sanshou ===
All sanshou athletes who placed in the top eight in the selected events for this competition (men's 56 kg, 70 kg or 80 kg; women's 52 kg or 60 kg) at the 2007 world championships qualified for the tournament. Vacancies due to illness, injury, or nonavailability were not filled, hence the unusual distribution of participants and rounds.

== Medal summary ==
Since the Beijing Wushu Tournament was not officially connected to the Olympic Games, medals earned were not added to the official Olympics medal tally.

=== Medal table ===
* Host nation (Host nation (China))

Rank	Nation	Gold	Silver	Bronze	Total
1	China (CHN)*	8	0	0	8
2	Russia (RUS)	2	3	0	5
3	Hong Kong (HKG)	2	1	1	4
4	Macau (MAC)	1	3	1	5
5	Iran (IRI)	1	1	2	4
5	Philippines (PHI)	1	1	2	4
7	Malaysia (MAS)	0	2	3	5
8	Vietnam (VIE)	0	1	3	4
9	Japan (JPN)	0	1	2	3
10	Chinese Taipei (TPE)	0	1	0	1
10	Italy (ITA)	0	1	0	1
12	Egypt (EGY)	0	0	2	2
13	Brazil (BRA)	0	0	1	1
13	Great Britain (GBR)	0	0	1	1
13	Indonesia (INA)	0	0	1	1
13	South Korea (KOR)	0	0	1	1
Totals (16 entries)		15	15	20	50

== Medalists ==
=== Men's taolu ===
Event	Gold	Silver	Bronze
Changquan	Yuan Xiaochao; China	Semen Udelov; Russia	Ehsan Peighambari; Iran
Daoshu / Gunshu	Zhao Qingjian; China	Jia Rui; Macau	Cheng Chung Hang; Hong Kong
Jianshu / Qiangshu	Liu Yang; Hong Kong	Lim Yew Fai; Malaysia	Nguyễn Huy Thành; Vietnam
Nanquan / Nangun	Willy Wang; Philippines	Peng Wei-Chua; Chinese Taipei	Pui Fook Chien; Malaysia
Taijiquan / Taijijian	Wu Yanan; China	Hei Zhi Hong; Hong Kong	Yoshihiro Shimoda; Japan

=== Men's sanshou ===
Event	Gold	Silver	Bronze
56 kg	Zhang Shuaike; China	Nazir Shandulaev; Russia	Qin Zhi Jian; Macau
56 kg	Zhang Shuaike; China	Nazir Shandulaev; Russia	Benjie Rivera; Philippines
70 kg	Cai Liang Chan; Macau	Murad Akhadov; Russia	Ahmad Ibrahim; Egypt
70 kg	Cai Liang Chan; Macau	Murad Akhadov; Russia	Yoon Soon-Myung; South Korea
85 kg	Muslim Salihov; Russia	Hossein Ojaghi; Iran	Emerson Almeida; Brazil
85 kg	Muslim Salihov; Russia	Hossein Ojaghi; Iran	Nicholas Evagorou; United Kingdom

=== Women's taolu ===
Event	Gold	Silver	Bronze
Changquan	Daria Tarasova; Russia	Xi Cheng Qing; Macau	Susyana Tjhan; Indonesia
Daoshu / Gunshu	Geng Xiaoling; Hong Kong	Jade Xu; Italy	Chai Fong Wei; Malaysia
Jianshu / Qiangshu	Ma Lingjuan; China	Han Jing; Macau	Nguyễn Mai Phương; Vietnam
Nanquan / Nandao	Lin Fan; China	Erika Kojima; Japan	Diana Bong Siong Lin; Malaysia
Taijiquan / Taijijian	Cui Wenjuan; China	Chai Fong Ying; Malaysia	Ai Miyaoka; Japan

=== Women's sanshou ===
Event	Gold	Silver	Bronze
52 kg	Qin Lizi; China	Mary Jane Estimar; Philippines	Nguyễn Thúy Ngân; Vietnam
52 kg	Qin Lizi; China	Mary Jane Estimar; Philippines	Farzaneh Dehghani; Iran
60 kg	Zahra Karimi; Iran	Lương Thị Hoa; Vietnam	Walaa Abdelrazek; Egypt
60 kg	Zahra Karimi; Iran	Lương Thị Hoa; Vietnam	Mariane Mariano; Philippines

== Participating nations ==
- Argentina (1)
- Armenia (1)
- Azerbaijan (2)
- Australia (1)
- Brazil (3)
- Canada (3)
- China (8)
- Cuba (1)
- Egypt (4)
- Spain (1)
- France (1)
- Great Britain (2)
- Hong Kong (6)
- Indonesia (5)
- Iran (5)
- Israel (1)
- Italy (4)
- Japan (6)
- Kazakhstan (1)
- South Korea (5)
- Lebanon (1)
- Macau (7)
- Malaysia (7)
- Mexico (1)
- Myanmar (2)
- Netherlands (1)
- New Zealand (1)
- Philippines (4)
- Poland (1)
- Romania (3)
- South Africa (1)
- Russia (8)
- Singapore (4)
- Sri Lanka (1)
- Switzerland (1)
- Sweden (1)
- Thailand (1)
- Chinese Taipei (6)
- Tunisia (2)
- Turkey (1)
- Ukraine (1)
- United States (5)
- Vietnam (8)

== See also ==
- 2007 World Wushu Championships – hosted in Beijing
- 2014 Nanjing Youth Wushu Tournament
