= 2008 Beijing Wushu Tournament – Women's sanshou 52 kg =

Women's sanshou 52 kg at the 2008 Beijing Wushu Tournament
- Venue: Olympic Sports Center Gymnasium
- Dates: 21-24 August
- Competitors: 9 from 9 nations

Medalists
gold medal	Qin Lizi	China
silver medal	Mary Jane Estimar	Philippines
bronze medal	Nguyễn Thúy Ngân	Vietnam
bronze medal	Farzaneh Dehghani	Iran

The women's sanshou 52 kilograms competition at the 2008 Beijing Wushu Tournament was held from 21 to 24 August at the Olympic Sports Center Gymnasium.

== Background ==
The top-eight non-Chinese athletes qualified at the 2007 World Wushu Championships. China's Qin Lizi was the 2007 world champion and with her participation in the Beijing Wushu Tournament, the roster ended up with nine competitors. Coincidentally, the results at the tournament were identical with the 2007 world championships, with Qin Lizi being the champion once again.

== Schedule ==
All times are Beijing Time (UTC+08:00)

Date	Time	Event
Thursday, 21 August 2008	15:00	Round of 16
Friday, 22 August 2008	15:00	Quarterfinals
Saturday, 23 August 2008	15:00	Semifinals
Sunday, 24 August 2008	9:30	Final

== Results ==
Legend:

TV = Technical victory

Round of 16
Kim A-Ri (KOR)	0
Cristina Toporâște (ROU)	2

Quarterfinals
Qin Lizi (CHN)	TV
Cristina Toporâște (ROU)
Maria de la Fuente (MEX)	0
Nguyễn Thúy Ngân (VIE)	2
Farzaneh Dehghani (IRI)	2
Ariana Ortega (BRA)	0
Ambra Vielmi (ITA)	1
Mary Jane Estimar (PHI)	2

Semifinals
Qin Lizi (CHN)	2
Nguyễn Thúy Ngân (VIE)	0
Farzaneh Dehghani (IRI)	1
Mary Jane Estimar (PHI)	2

Final
Qin Lizi (CHN)	2
Mary Jane Estimar (PHI)	0
