= 2008 Beijing Wushu Tournament – Men's sanshou 56 kg =

Men's sanshou 56 kg at the 2008 Beijing Wushu Tournament
- Venue: Olympic Sports Center Gymnasium
- Dates: 21-24 August
- Competitors: 9 from 9 nations

Medalists
gold medal	Zhang Shuaike	China
silver medal	Nazir Shandulaev	Russia
bronze medal	Qin Zhi Jian	Macau
bronze medal	Benjie Rivera	Philippines

The men's sanshou 56 kilograms competition at the 2008 Beijing Wushu Tournament was held from 21 to 24 August at the Olympic Sports Center Gymnasium.

== Schedule ==
All times are Beijing Time (UTC+08:00)

Date	Time	Event
Thursday, 21 August 2008	15:44	Round of 16
Friday, 22 August 2008	15:44	Quarterfinals
Saturday, 23 August 2008	15:44	Semifinals
Sunday, 24 August 2008	9:54	Final

== Results ==
Round of 16
Sanan Hagverdiyev (AZE)	0
Panyawut Kongkliang (THA)	2

Quarterfinals
Zhang Shuaike (CHN)	2
Panyawut Kongkliang (THA)	0
Abderrahmen Laamiri (TUN)	0
Qin Zhi Jian (MAC)	2
Benjie Rivera (PHI)	2
Mohamed Kamel (EGY)	0
Truong Trọng Đỏ (VIE)	0
Nazir Shandulaev (RUS)	2

Semifinals
Zhang Shuaike (CHN)	2
Qin Zhi Jian (MAC)	0
Benjie Rivera (PHI)	0
Nazir Shandulaev (RUS)	2

Final
Zhang Shuaike (CHN)	2
Nazir Shandulaev (RUS)	0
