= 2008 Beijing Wushu Tournament – Men's sanshou 85 kg =

Men's sanshou 85 kg at the 2008 Beijing Wushu Tournament
- Venue: Olympic Sports Center Gymnasium
- Dates: 22-24 August
- Competitors: 8 from 8 nations

Medalists
gold medal	Muslim Salikhov	Russia
silver medal	Hossein Ojaghi	Iran
bronze medal	Emerson Almeida	Brazil
bronze medal	Nicholas Evagorou	Great Britain

The men's sanshou 85 kilograms competition at the 2008 Beijing Wushu Tournament was held from 21 to 24 August at the Olympic Sports Center Gymnasium.

== Schedule ==
All times are Beijing Time (UTC+08:00)

Date	Time	Event
Friday, 22 August 2008	16:24	Quarterfinals
Saturday, 23 August 2008	16:24	Semifinals
Sunday, 24 August 2008	10:46	Final

== Results ==
Legend:

DI = Default-injury

KO = Knock-out

Quarterfinals
Muslim Salihov (RUS)	DI
Elshad Ibrahimov (AZE)
Elie Saade (LIB)	0
Nicholas Evagorou (GBR)	2
Emerson Almeida (BRA)	2
Eugen Preda (ROU)	1
Oliver Hasler (SUI)	0
Hossein Ojaghi (IRI)	2

Semifinals
Muslim Salihov (RUS)	KO
Nicholas Evagorou (GBR)
Emerson Almeida (BRA)	0
Hossein Ojaghi (IRI)	2

Final
Muslim Salihov (RUS)	DI
Hossein Ojaghi (IRI)
