= 2008 Beijing Wushu Tournament – Women's sanshou 60 kg =

Women's sanshou 60 kg at the 2008 Beijing Wushu Tournament
- Venue: Olympic Sports Center Gymnasium
- Dates: 21-24 August
- Competitors: 7 from 7 nations

Medalists
gold medal	Zahra Karimi	Iran
silver medal	Lương Thị Hoa	Vietnam
bronze medal	Walaa Abdelrazek	Egypt
bronze medal	Mariane Mariano	Philippines

The women's sanshou 52 kilograms competition at the 2008 Beijing Wushu Tournament was held from 21 to 24 August at the Olympic Sports Center Gymnasium.

== Schedule ==
All times are Beijing Time (UTC+08:00)

Date	Time	Event
Thursday, 21 August 2008	15:14	Quarterfinals
Saturday, 23 August 2008	15:24	Semifinals
Sunday, 24 August 2008	9:44	Final

== Results ==
Quarterfinals		Semifinals		Final
		Lương Thị Hoa (VIE)	2
Sarah Ponce (USA)	0	Walaa Abdelrazek (EGY)	1
Walaa Abdelrazek (EGY)	2			Lương Thị Hoa (VIE)	1
Mariane Mariano (PHI)	2			Zahra Karimi (IRI)	2
Hanna Sillén (SWE)	0	Mariane Mariano (PHI)	0
Ahlem Grissette (TUN)	0	Zahra Karimi (IRI)	2
Zahra Karimi (IRI)	2
