= Wu Yanan (wushu) =

Chinese wushu practitioner

Personal information
- Born: November 30, 1986 (age 39) Xi'an, Shaanxi, China
- Height: 1.78 m (5 ft 10 in)

Sport
- Sport: Wushu
- Event(s): Taijiquan, Taijijian
- Team: Shaanxi Wushu Team (-2011)
- Coached by: Xu Yuru
Medal record
Representing China
Men's Wushu Taolu
Olympic Games (Unofficial)
Gold medal – first place	2008 Beijing	Taijiquan+Taijijian
World Games
Gold medal – first place	2009 Kaohsiung	Taijiquan+Taijijian
World Championships
Gold medal – first place	2007 Beijing	Taijiquan
Gold medal – first place	2011 Ankara	Taijijian
Asian Games
Gold medal – first place	2006 Doha	Taijiquan+Taijijian
Gold medal – first place	2010 Guangzhou	Taijiquan+Taijijian
Asian Championships
Gold medal – first place	2008 Macau	Taijiquan
East Asian Games
Gold medal – first place	2005 Macau	Taijiquan

Wu Yanan (Chinese: 吴雅楠; pinyin: Wúyǎnán; born November 30, 1986) is a retired Chinese wushu taolu and taijiquan athlete of Hui ethnicity.

== Career ==
At an early age, Wu was recommended to study taijiquan with the Shanxi wushu team under Xu Yuru. Wu later made his international debut at the 2005 East Asian Games where he won the gold medal in the taijiquan and taijijian combined event. A year later at the 2006 Asian Games, he won the gold medal in taijiquan. After winning the gold medal in taijiquan at the 2007 World Wushu Championships, he competed and won at the 2008 Beijing Wushu Tournament the 2009 World Games, and the 2010 Asian Games in the same combined event. His last competition was at the 2011 World Wushu Championships where he won a gold medal in taijijian.

== See also ==
- List of Asian Games medalists in wushu
- China national wushu team
