= Liu Hailong =

Chinese Sanshou kickboxer (born 1981)

- Born: Liu Hailong; May 30, 1981 (age 45); Shandong, China
- Other names: Liu Tui Pi Gua, King of Sanda
- Height: 1.76 m (5 ft 9 in)
- Weight: 80 kg (180 lb; 13 st)
- Style: Sanda
- Years active: 1999-2009

Liu Hailong
Medal record

Representing China

Wushu sanda

World Championships
Gold medal – first place	2003 Macao	80 kg

Liu Hailong (Chinese: 柳海龙; pinyin: Liǔ Hǎilóng, born May 30, 1981, in Shandong Province) is a Chinese sanda kickboxer. Liu's rise to fame came in 2000 in the inaugural King of sanda tournament. Liu not only won his weight class, but went on to win a one-night open weight round robin tournament, giving him the title Sanda "King of Kings".

At the 2002 Sanshou World Cup in Macau, Liu faced Muslim Salihov in a competition and beat him on points to win the 80 kg division gold medal. Salihov is a highly accomplished Russian Sanshou fighter who would later become a King of Sanda himself. Some fight observers believe Salihov won the closely contested match.

In 2003, Liu faced a fellow King of Sanda in Yuan Yubao in the promotion's first "superfight", defeating him by decision to earn the title of "Super King of Sanda".

In December 2003, Liu scored a unanimous decision over Eduardo Fujihara to claim the IKF Sanshou World Championship.

After an injury in 2005, Liu retired from the sport. In 2009, he made a comeback facing and defeating Japanese fighter Iga Koji.

== Championships and awards ==
- Chinese Sanda King Tournament
  - 2003 Chinese Sanda King of Super Championship
  - 2003 Chinese Sanda King Championship
  - 2002 Chinese Sanda King of Super Championship
  - 2000 Chinese Sanda King Championship
- IKF Sanshou World Championships
  - IKF Sanshou World Championships -80 kg Championship
- World Wushu Championships
  - 2003 World Wushu Championships Gold Medalist (gold)
- Sanda World Cup
  - 2004 Sanda World Cup Gold Medalist (gold)
  - 2002 Sanda World Cup Gold Medalist (gold)
- Chinese Sanda Championships
  - 2004 Chinese Sanda Championships -80 kg Championship
  - 2003 Chinese Sanda Champion Championships -80 kg Championship
  - 2002 Chinese Sanda Championships -80 kg Championship
  - 2001 The 9th National Games Sanda -75 kg Championship
  - 2000 Chinese Sanda Championships -75 kg Championship
  - 2000 Chinese Sanda Group Championships 75–80 kg Championship

== Sanda record(incomplete) ==
Kickboxing record
50 wins, 4 losses
Date	Result	Opponent	Event	Location	Method	Round	Time
2003-12	Win	(Brazil) Eduardo Fujihara	IKF Sanshou	China	Decision (Unanimous)	3	3:00
Wins IKF Sanshou −80.0kg World Championship.
2003-11-07	Win	(Egypt) Mohamed Selit	7th IWUF Wushu World Championship, Finals	Macau, China	Decision (Unanimous)	3	3:00
Wins 7th IWUF Wushu World Championship Men's sanda −80.0kg Gold Medal.
2003-11-05	Win	(Russia) Muslim Salikhov	7th IWUF Wushu World Championship, 1/8 Finals	Macau, China	Decision (Unanimous)	3	3:00
2002-09-07	Win	(Thailand) Kriengkrai Sor Vorapin	Chinese Kung Fu vs Muaythai	Guangzhou, China	Decision	5	3:00
2001-09-15	Win	(Thailand) Robert Kaennorasing	Chinese Kung Fu vs Muaythai	Guangzhou, China	Decision	5	3:00

== Filmography ==
- He-Man (2011)
- All Men Are Brothers (TV series) (2011)
- Police Story 2013 (2013)
