= Muslim Salikhov =

Russian mixed martial artist (born 1984)

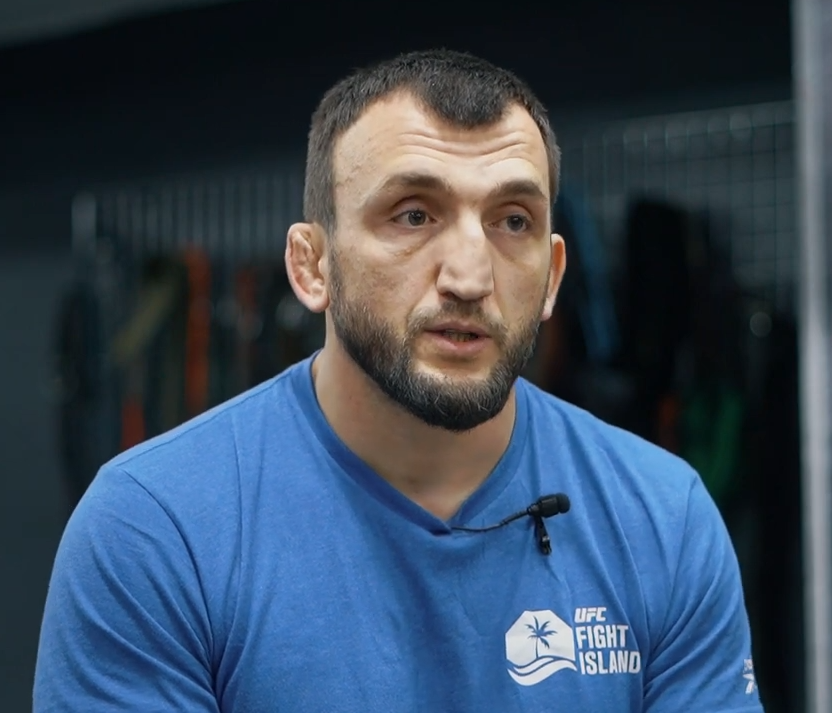
- Muslim Salikhov in 2020
- Born: Muslim Magomedovich Salikhov; June 9, 1984 (age 42); Buynaksk, Dagestan ASSR, Russian SFSR, Soviet Union
- Native name: Муслим Салигь Мугьамматны уланы
- Other names: King of Kung Fu
- Nationality: Russian
- Height: 5 ft 11 in (180 cm)
- Weight: 170 lb (77 kg; 12 st 2 lb)
- Division: Welterweight
- Reach: 70 in (178 cm)
- Style: Sanda
- Fighting out of: Khasavyurt, Dagestan, Russia
- Team: Berkut FC; American Top Team
- Rank: Honored Master of Sports and 5th dan in Wushu Sanda; Master of Sports in Complex Martial Arts; Purple belt in Brazilian Jiu-Jitsu
- Years active: 2011–present

Kickboxing record
- Total: 199
- Wins: 185
- By knockout: 76
- Losses: 13
- By knockout: 1
- Draws: 1

Mixed martial arts record
- Total: 29
- Wins: 22
- By knockout: 15
- By submission: 2
- By decision: 5
- Losses: 7
- By knockout: 3
- By submission: 2
- By decision: 2

Other information
- Notable school: Five Directions of the World
- Mixed martial arts record from Sherdog

Muslim Salikhov
Medal record

Representing Russia

Men's Sanda

Olympic Games (Unofficial)
Gold medal – first place	2008 Beijing	85 kg

World Games
Silver medal – second place	2009 Kaohsiung	85 kg

World Combat Games
Gold medal – first place	2013 St. Peterburg	80 kg
Bronze medal – third place	2010 Beijing	85 kg

World Championships
Gold medal – first place	2015 Jakarta	80 kg
Silver medal – second place	2013 Kuala Lumpur	80 kg
Gold medal – first place	2011 Ankara	80 kg
Gold medal – first place	2009 Toronto	85 kg
Gold medal – first place	2007 Beijing	85 kg
Gold medal – first place	2005 Hanoi	80 kg

Muslim Magomedovich Salikhov (Russian: Муслим Магомедович Салихов, Kumyk: Муслим Салигь Мугьамматны уланы; born June 9, 1984) is a Russian professional mixed martial artist and Sanda fighter. He currently competes in the Welterweight division of the Ultimate Fighting Championship (UFC). A multiple-time Wushu Sanda world champion, Salikhov occupies a place alongside Hossein Ojaghi as one of only two non-Chinese athletes to have won the Wushu Sanda King's Cup.

== Early life ==
Muslim Salikhov was born in Buynaksk, Dagestan. His ethnicity is Kumyk. In 1995, he began to practice Wushu Sanda while attending the Five Directions of the World, a school famous for combining general and martial arts education.

== Wushu ==
=== Wushu Sanda ===
Salikhov faced Liu Hailong who held the title "King of Sanda" at the 2003 World Wushu Championships in Macau. Both were evenly matched, with Liu Hailong declared the winner. Salikhov was the Sanshou champion at the 2004 European Wushu Championships held in Moscow and he became the World Champion in 2005.

In February 2006, he participated in the first international "King of Sanda" tournament in Chongqing and became the first non-Chinese to win the title. He again won the world title in 2007 and 2009. At the World Wushu Championships, he became one of the most decorated sanda athletes of all time and was the first sanda athlete to win five gold medals. He was also a gold medalist at the 2008 Beijing Wushu Tournament, and won medals at the 2009 World Games and the World Combat Games.

Muslim Salikhov is often acknowledged as one of the best Wushu Sanda competitors in history.

== Mixed martial arts ==
=== Early career ===
Salikhov made his professional MMA debut in July 2011. Over the next year and a half, he earned a record of two wins and one loss.

=== M-1 Global ===
By early 2013, Salikhov signed with M-1 Global, preparing with Phuket Top Team for his mixed martial arts debut. He fought three times for the promotion, going undefeated during this run.

=== Other promotions ===
Beginning in 2015, Salikhov fought for various regional promotions in China and Russia. He fought seven times over two years, going undefeated during this run with six of the seven wins coming via knockout.

Salikhov earned his biggest win to date when he earned a victory over UFC and Bellator veteran Melvin Guillard by spinning hook kick.

=== Ultimate Fighting Championship ===
On October 19, 2017, Salikhov signed with the UFC.

In his debut for the promotion, Salikhov faced Alex Garcia on November 25, 2017, at UFC Fight Night 122. He lost the fight via submission in the second round.

Salikhov faced Abdul Razak Alhassan on April 14, 2018, on UFC on Fox 29. However, Alhassan was pulled from the card, citing injury, and he was replaced by promotional newcomer Ricky Rainey. He won the fight via technical knock out in round two.

On July 20, 2018, Salikhov was notified of a potential doping violation by USADA from an out-of-competition sample collected on June 7, 2018. On March 4, 2019, Salikhov was cleared of USADA suspension as USADA could not determine if Salikhov had ingested oral Turinabol a year before he was signed to the UFC and entered the USADA drug-testing program.

Salikhov faced Nordine Taleb on September 7, 2019, at UFC 242. He won the fight via knockout in the first round. This win earned him the Performance of the Night award.

Salikhov faced Laureano Staropoli on October 26, 2019, at UFC Fight Night 162. He won the fight via unanimous decision.

Salikhov was expected to face Niko Price on April 11, 2020, at UFC Fight Night: Overeem vs. Harris. However, due to the COVID-19 pandemic, the event was eventually postponed and pairing scrapped.

Salikhov faced Elizeu Zaleski dos Santos on July 11, 2020, at UFC 251. He won the fight via a split decision.

Salikhov was scheduled to face Cláudio Silva on October 18, 2020 at UFC Fight Night 180. However, on October 4, it was announced that Salikhov pulled out due to undisclosed reasons and was replaced by James Krause.

Salikhov was scheduled to face Santiago Ponzinibbio on January 16, 2021, at UFC on ABC 1. However, Salikhov pulled out of the bout in mid-December citing health issues after contracting COVID-19.

Salikhov faced Francisco Trinaldo on June 5, 2021, at UFC Fight Night 189. He won the fight via unanimous decision.

Salikhov was scheduled to face Michel Pereira on January 15, 2022, at UFC on ESPN 32. However, Salikhov withdrew from the bout for undisclosed reasons and the bout was cancelled.

Salikhov faced Li Jingliang on July 16, 2022, at UFC on ABC 3. He lost the fight via technical knockout in the second round.

Salikhov faced André Fialho on November 19, 2022, at UFC Fight Night 215. He won the fight via technical knockout in round three. With this win, Salikhov earned the Performance of the Night award.

Salikhov faced Nicolas Dalby on June 17, 2023, at UFC on ESPN 47. He lost the bout via unanimous decision.

Salikhov was scheduled to face Randy Brown on December 16, 2023, at UFC 296. However, the bout was scrapped after Brown withdrew due to illness. The pair was rescheduled to meet at UFC Fight Night 235 on February 3, 2024. Salikhov lost in the first round by knockout.

Salikhov faced Santiago Ponzinibbio on July 13, 2024 at UFC on ESPN 59. He won the fight by split decision. 9 out of 13 media outlets scored the bout for Ponzinibbio.

Salikhov faced Song Kenan on November 23, 2024 at UFC Fight Night 248. He won the fight via a spinning wheel kick knockout in the first round. This fight earned him another Performance of the Night award.

Salikhov faced Carlos Leal Miranda on July 26, 2025 at UFC on ABC 9. He won the fight via knockout in the first round. This fight earned him another Performance of the Night award.

Salikhov faced Uroš Medić on November 8, 2025, at UFC Fight Night 264. He lost the fight via technical knockout early in the first round.

Salikhov was scheduled to face Jake Matthews on May 30, 2026 at UFC Fight Night 277. However, Salikhov withdrew for undisclosed reasons and was replaced by Carlston Harris.

Salikhov faced Ignacio Bahamondes on September 12, 2026 at UFC Fight Night 288. He lost the fight by unanimous decision.

== Championships and accomplishments ==
=== Mixed martial arts ===
- Ultimate Fighting Championship
  - Performance of the Night (Four times) vs. Nordine Taleb, André Fialho, Song Kenan and Carlos Leal Miranda

=== Muay Thai ===
- WBC Muay Thai
  - WBC Muaythai international challenge Cruiserweight Winner

=== Wushu - Sanda ===
- Kung Fu King Tournament
  - 2006 KFK Tournament (80 kg).
  - 2009 KFK Tournament Runner Uo (80 kg).
- World Wushu Championship
  - 2015 - 13th World Wushu Championships Winner
  - 2013 - 12th World Wushu Championships Runner Up
  - 2011 - 11th World Wushu Championships Winner
  - 2009 - 10th World Wushu Championships Winner
  - 2007 - 9th World Wushu Championships Winner
  - 2008 Beijing Wushu Tournament Winner
  - 2005 - 8th World Wushu Championships Winner
- Sanda World Cup
  - 3rd Sanda World Cup Winner

== Mixed martial arts record ==
Professional record breakdown
29 matches	22 wins	7 losses
By knockout	15	3
By submission	2	2
By decision	5	2

Res.	Record	Opponent	Method	Event	Date	Round	Time	Location	Notes
Loss	22–7	Ignacio Bahamondes	Decision (unanimous)	UFC Fight Night: Silva vs. Delgado	September 12, 2026	3	5:00	Glendale, Arizona, United States	
Loss	22–6	Uroš Medić	TKO (punches)	UFC Fight Night: Bonfim vs. Brown	November 8, 2025	1	1:03	Las Vegas, Nevada, United States	
Win	22–5	Carlos Leal Miranda	KO (punch)	UFC on ABC: Whittaker vs. de Ridder	July 26, 2025	1	0:42	Abu Dhabi, United Arab Emirates	Performance of the Night.
Win	21–5	Song Kenan	KO (spinning wheel kick)	UFC Fight Night: Yan vs. Figueiredo	November 23, 2024	1	3:49	Macau SAR, China	Performance of the Night.
Win	20–5	Santiago Ponzinibbio	Decision (split)	UFC on ESPN: Namajunas vs. Cortez	July 13, 2024	3	5:00	Denver, Colorado, United States	
Loss	19–5	Randy Brown	KO (punches)	UFC Fight Night: Dolidze vs. Imavov	February 3, 2024	1	3:17	Las Vegas, Nevada, United States	
Loss	19–4	Nicolas Dalby	Decision (unanimous)	UFC on ESPN: Vettori vs. Cannonier	June 17, 2023	3	5:00	Las Vegas, Nevada, United States	
Win	19–3	André Fialho	TKO (spinning wheel kick and punches)	UFC Fight Night: Nzechukwu vs. Cuțelaba	November 19, 2022	3	1:03	Las Vegas, Nevada, United States	Performance of the Night.
Loss	18–3	Li Jingliang	TKO (punches and elbows)	UFC on ABC: Ortega vs. Rodríguez	July 16, 2022	2	4:38	Elmont, New York, United States	
Win	18–2	Francisco Trinaldo	Decision (unanimous)	UFC Fight Night: Rozenstruik vs. Sakai	June 5, 2021	3	5:00	Las Vegas, Nevada, United States	
Win	17–2	Elizeu Zaleski dos Santos	Decision (split)	UFC 251	July 12, 2020	3	5:00	Abu Dhabi, United Arab Emirates	
Win	16–2	Laureano Staropoli	Decision (unanimous)	UFC Fight Night: Maia vs. Askren	October 26, 2019	3	5:00	Kallang, Singapore	
Win	15–2	Nordine Taleb	KO (punch)	UFC 242	September 7, 2019	1	4:26	Abu Dhabi, United Arab Emirates	Performance of the Night.
Win	14–2	Ricky Rainey	KO (punches)	UFC on Fox: Poirier vs. Gaethje	April 14, 2018	2	4:12	Glendale, Arizona, United States	
Loss	13–2	Alex Garcia	Submission (rear-naked choke)	UFC Fight Night: Bisping vs. Gastelum	November 25, 2017	2	3:22	Shanghai, China	
Win	13–1	Melvin Guillard	KO (spinning hook kick)	Kunlun Fight MMA 12	June 1, 2017	1	1:33	Yantai, China	Catchweight (181 lb) bout; Guillard missed weight.
Win	12–1	Akoundou Epelet Evy Johannes	Submission (arm-triangle choke)	YunFeng Showdown 1	May 25, 2017	1	3:23	Shandong, China	
Win	11–1	Ivan Jorge	KO (spinning back kick)	Kunlun Fight: Cage Series 6	October 21, 2016	1	1:04	Yiwu, China	
Win	10–1	Gang Zhang	Submission (arm-triangle choke)	Superstar Fight 3	May 21, 2016	1	N/A	Harbin, China	
Win	9–1	Artem Shokalo	KO (spinning back kick)	Dagestan Cage Fighting 2016	April 2, 2016	1	2:31	Makhachkala, Russia	
Win	8–1	Kurbanjiang Tuluosibake	TKO (spinning back kick and punches)	Bullets Fly FC 3	January 16, 2016	1	0:18	Hebei, China	Catchweight (174 lb) bout.
Win	7–1	Tsuyoshi Yamashita	TKO (punches)	W.I.N. FC	July 18, 2015	1	N/A	Guangdong, China	
Win	6–1	Gele Qing	KO (punches)	CKF: Zhong Wu Ultimate Fighting	April 18, 2015	1	3:50	Beijing, China	
Win	5–1	Victor Sckoteski	TKO (punches)	M-1 Challenge 53	November 25, 2014	1	4:27	Beijing, China	
Win	4–1	Filip Kotarlic	KO (punch)	M-1 Challenge 44	November 30, 2013	1	3:05	Tula, Russia	Welterweight debut.
Win	3–1	Deyan Topalski	Decision (unanimous)	M-1 Challenge 38	April 9, 2013	3	5:00	Saint Petersburg, Russia	
Loss	2–1	Kris Hocum	Submission (rear-naked choke)	Beirut Elite FC: First Blood	December 15, 2012	1	1:40	Beirut, Lebanon	
Win	2–0	Dankao Sakda	KO (punch)	Top of the Forbidden City 4	August 19, 2011	1	6:56	Beijing, China	
Win	1–0	Tao Wang-hong	TKO (arm injury)	Top of the Forbidden City 2	July 22, 2011	1	0:51	Beijing, China	Middleweight debut.

== Sanda and kickboxing professional record (incomplete) ==
Kickboxing record (incomplete)
Date	Result	Opponent	Event	Location	Method	Round	Time
2017-07-16	Win	(China) Fang Qingquan	Fight King international Championship Final	Lantian, China	Decision (Unanimous)	3	3:00
2016-12-10	Win	(China) Nuerla Mulali	Kunlun Fight 55 80 kg 2016 Tournament Reserve Fight	Qingdao, China	KO (Spinning Backfist)	2	2:00
2016-01-31	Win	(China) Fu Gaofeng	Changbai Mountain Hero 2016	Jilin, China	Decision (Unanimous)	3	3:00
2014-01-11	Loss	(China) Nuerla Mulali	Hongdu Real estate & Qiancheng group Championship	Dalian, China	Decision (Unanimous)	3	3:00
2012-12-31	Loss	(China) Xu Yi	Wu Lin Feng Global Kung Fu Festival	Beijing, China	Decision (Unanimous)	3	3:00
2012-01-01	Win	(China) Li Baoming	Ultimate Fighter 2012	Changsha, China	Decision (Unanimous)	3	3:00
2011-10-22	Loss	(China) Fu Gaofeng	Shandong Heroes 2011	Yantai, China	Decision (Unanimous)	3	3:00
2011-06-18	Win	(China) Li Baoming	WBC Muaythai China Championships	Hunan, China	Decision (Unanimous)	3	3:00
Wins WBC Muaythai international challenge in China at Cruiserweight
2011-04-23	Win	(China) Guo Qiang	WBC Muaythai China Championships	Nanning, China	KO	2	
2011-01-18	Loss	(China) Fu Jiachun	2011 China vs Russia Sanshou Tournament -80 kg	Harbin, China	Decision (Unanimous)	3	3:00
2009-07-17	Loss	(Australia) Steve McKinnon	1st World Kung Fu King Championship (世界功夫王争霸赛) 75–90 kg, Quarter Finals	Guangzhou, China	Decision (Unanimous)	5	5:00
2009-06-26	Win	(France) Stéphane Attelly	1er Gala International Multi-boxes	Paris, France			
2009-03-14	Loss	(China) Yu Jin	4th Kung Fu King Tournament (国际武术搏击争霸赛), Finals	Chongqing, China	KO	2	
Fight was for 2009 KFK Tournament (80kg) title.
2009-03-14	Win	(China) Xu Jiaheng	4th Kung Fu King Tournament (国际武术搏击争霸赛), Semi Finals	Chongqing, China	Decision (Unanimous)	3	3:00
2009-03-12	Win	(China) Yang Yuanfei	4th Kung Fu King Tournament (国际武术搏击争霸赛), Quarter Finals	Chongqing, China	KO	2	
2009-03-10	Win	(Brazil) Eduardo Bernadette Filho	4th Kung Fu King Tournament (国际武术搏击争霸赛), 1/8 Finals	Chongqing, China	KO	2	
2007-08-01	Win	(China) Fang Bian	2007 China vs Russia Sanshou Tournament -80 kg	Harbin, China	Decision (Unanimous)	3	3:00
2007-03-23	Loss	(China) Bai Jinbin	2nd Kung Fu King Tournament (国际武术搏击争霸赛), Semi Finals	Chongqing, China	Decision (Unanimous)	3	3:00
2006-02-26	Win	(China) Gele Qing	1st Kung Fu King Tournament (国际武术搏击争霸赛), Finals	Chongqing, China	Decision (Unanimous)	3	3:00
Wins the 2006 KFK Tournament (80kg).
2006-02-26	Win	(China) Zhang Tingbin	1st Kung Fu King Tournament (国际武术搏击争霸赛), Semi Finals	Chongqing, China	Decision (Unanimous)	3	3:00
2006-02-25	Win	(China) Aotegen Bateer	1st Kung Fu King Tournament (国际武术搏击争霸赛), Quarter Finals	Chongqing, China	Decision (Unanimous)	3	3:00
2006-02-24	Win	(China) Xue Fengqiang	1st Kung Fu King Tournament (国际武术搏击争霸赛), 1/8 Finals	Chongqing, China	Decision (Unanimous)	3	3:00

== Sanda amateur record (incomplete) ==
Kickboxing record (incomplete)
Date	Result	Opponent	Event	Location	Method	Round	Time
2015-11-17	Win	(China) Fu Gaofeng	13th World Wushu Championships, Final	Jakarta, Indonesia	Decision	3	2:00
2015-11-17	Win	(Kazakhstan) Bagdat Kenzhetayev	13th World Wushu Championships, Semi Finals	Jakarta, Indonesia	Decision	3	2:00
2015-11-17	Win	(Algeria) Moumou Abdelhakim	13th World Wushu Championships, Quarter Finals	Jakarta, Indonesia	Decision	3	2:00
2013-11-05	Loss	(Iran) Amir Fazli	12th World Wushu Championships, Final	Kuala Lumpur, Malaysia	Decision (2–1)	3	2:00
2013-11-04	Win	(United States) Alejandro Cisne	12th World Wushu Championships, Semi Finals	Kuala Lumpur, Malaysia	Decision (2–0)	2	2:00
2013-11-03	Win	(Kazakhstan) Mergen Bilyalov	12th World Wushu Championships, Quarter Finals	Kuala Lumpur, Malaysia	Decision (2–0)	2	2:00
2013-11-02	Win	(Belarus) Rolich Vadzim	12th World Wushu Championships, 1/8 Finals	Kuala Lumpur, Malaysia	Decision (2–0)	2	2:00
2013-10-26	Win	(Canada) Nacereddine Zemmal	2nd World Combat Games, Final	Saint Petersburg, Russia			
2013-10-25	Win	(Egypt) Ashraf Mohamed Abdelgawad Abdelhamid	2nd World Combat Games, Semi Finals	Saint Petersburg, Russia			
2011-10-15	Win	(Egypt) Abdelhamid El-Sayad	11th World Wushu Championships, Final	Ankara, Turkey	Decision (2–0)	2	2:00
2011-10-14	Win	(Canada) Nacereddine Zemmal	11th World Wushu Championships, Semi Finals	Ankara, Turkey	Decision (2–0)	2	2:00
2011-10-12	Win	(Spain) Velaz Miguel	11th World Wushu Championships, Quarter Finals	Ankara, Turkey	Decision (2–0)	2	2:00
2011-10-11	Win	(Chile) Salvador Gajardo Lopez	11th World Wushu Championships, 1/8 Finals	Ankara, Turkey	Absolute Victory		
2011-10-11	Win	(Iran) Amir Fazli	11th World Wushu Championships, 1/16 Finals	Ankara, Turkey	Decision (2–0)	2	2:00
2010-08-28	Loss	(China) Xu Jiaheng	1st World Combat Games, Semi Finals	Beijing, China	Decision (2–1)	3	2:00
2009-10-30	Win	(Iran) Hamid Reza Gholipour	10th World Wushu Championships, Final	Toronto, Canada	Decision (2–0)	2	2:00
2009-10-28	Win	(China) Xu Jiaheng	10th World Wushu Championships, Semi Finals	Toronto, Canada	Decision (2–0)	2	2:00
2009-10-27	Win	(Poland) Igor Kolacin	10th World Wushu Championships, Quarter Finals	Toronto, Canada	Decision (2–0)	2	2:00
2009-10-26	Win	(Netherlands) Masood Rahimi	10th World Wushu Championships, 1/8 Finals	Toronto, Canada	Absolute Victory		
2009-07-26	Loss	(Iran) Hamid Reza Gholipour	8th World Games, Finals	Kaohsiung, Taiwan			
2008-08-24	Win	(Iran) Hossein Ojaghi	2008 Beijing Wushu Tournament, Final	Beijing, China	Default		
2008-08-23	Win	(United Kingdom) Nick Evagorou	2008 Beijing Wushu Tournament, Semi Finals	Beijing, China	KO		
2008-08-22	Win	(Azerbaijan) Elshad Ibrahimov	2008 Beijing Wushu Tournament, Quarter Finals	Beijing, China	Default		
2007-11-17	Win	(Iran) Hossein Ojaghi	9th World Wushu Championships, Final	Beijing, China	Decision (2–0)	2	2:00
2007-11-16	Win	(United Kingdom) Nick Evagorou	9th World Wushu Championships, Semi Finals	Beijing, China	Absolute Victory		
2007-11-15	Win	(Romania) Eugen Preda	9th World Wushu Championships, Quarter Finals	Beijing, China	Decision (2–1)	3	2:00
2007-11-14	Win	(Uzbekistan) Elyorbek Akbarov	9th World Wushu Championships, 1/8 Finals	Beijing, China	Absolute Victory		
2007-11-12	Win	(Egypt) Mohamed Yousef Ramdan	9th World Wushu Championships, 1/16 Finals	Beijing, China	Decision (2–0)	2	2:00
2006-09-23	Win	(Iran) Eslam Ghorbani	3rd Sanda World Cup, Final	Xi'an, China	Decision	3	2:00
2006-09-23	Win	(Italy) Daniele Chiofalo	3rd Sanda World Cup, Semi Finals	Xi'an, China	Decision	3	2:00
2005-12-14	Win	(Iran) Eslam Ghorbani	8th World Wushu Championships, Final	Hanoi, Vietnam			
2005-12-13	Win	(France) Stéphane Attelly	8th World Wushu Championships, Semi Finals	Hanoi, Vietnam			
2005-12-13	Win	N&A	8th World Wushu Championships, Quarter Finals	Hanoi, Vietnam			
2004-11-14	Loss	(China) Zheng Yuhao	2nd Sanda World Cup, 1/8 Finals	Guangzhou, China	Decision	3	
2003-11-05	Loss	(China) Liu Hailong	7th World Wushu Championships, 1/8 Finals	Macau, China	Decision	3	2:00
