= 2008 Beijing Wushu Tournament – Men's taijiquan =

Men's taijiquan at the 2008 Beijing Wushu Tournament
- Venue: Olympic Sports Center Gymnasium
- Dates: 22-23 August
- Competitors: 8 from 8 nations

Medalists
| gold medal | Wu Yanan | China |
| silver medal | Hei Zhi Hong | Hong Kong |
| bronze medal | Yoshihiro Shimoda | Japan |

The men's taijiquan / taijijian all-around competition at the 2008 Beijing Wushu Tournament was held from August 21 to 22 at the Olympic Sports Center Gymnasium.

== Background ==
At the 2007 World Wushu Championships, China's Wu Yanan and Japan's Yoshihiro Shimoda were the gold medalists in the taijiquan and taijijian events respectively. Two other favorites in this event were Taipei's Chang Ching-Kuei who was the silver medalist in taijiquan and Hong Kong's Hei Zhi Hong who placed third in taijijian.

At the competition during the first round of taijijian, Wu quickly set himself apart from the rest of the competition with a 9.90, the highest score ever received at the Beijing Wushu Tournament. He was followed by Hei who distanced himself from Chang by another wide margin. In the second round of taijiquan, Wu and Hei secured their medal positions and Chang received a low score, leaving Shimoda to make a comeback to receive the bronze medal.

== Schedule ==
All times are Beijing Time (UTC+08:00)

| Date | Time | Event |
|---|---|---|
| Friday, 22 August 2008 | 21:25 | Taijijian |
| Saturday, 23 August 2008 | 21:16 | Taijiquan |

== Results ==
The taijijian event was judged without the degree of difficulty component while the taijiquan event was judged with it.

| Rank | Athlete | Taijijian | Taijiquan | Total |
|---|---|---|---|---|
| 1st place, gold medalist(s) | Wu Yanan (CHN) | 9.90 | 9.87 | 19.77 |
| 2nd place, silver medalist(s) | Hei Zhi Hong (HKG) | 9.71 | 9.71 | 19.42 |
| 3rd place, bronze medalist(s) | Yoshihiro Shimoda (JPN) | 9.61 | 9.65 | 19.26 |
| 4 | Lee Yang (MAS) | 9.59 | 9.60 | 19.19 |
| 5 | Jang Young-Ho (KOR) | 9.51 | 9.51 | 19.02 |
| 6 | Goh Qiu Bin (SIN) | 9.49 | 9.52 | 19.01 |
| 7 | Fei Bao Yao (NED) | 9.53 | 9.42 | 18.95 |
| 8 | Chang Ching-Kuei (TPE) | 9.64 | 9.20 | 18.84 |
