= UFC on ESPN: Ngannou vs. Rozenstruik =

UFC mixed martial arts cancelled event in 2020

- The poster for UFC on ESPN: Ngannou vs. Rozenstruik
- Promotion: Ultimate Fighting Championship
- Date: March 28, 2020 (cancelled)
- Venue: Nationwide Arena
- City: Columbus, Ohio, United States

Event chronology
UFC Fight Night: Woodley vs. Edwards	UFC on ESPN: Ngannou vs. Rozenstruik	UFC Fight Night: Overeem vs. Harris

UFC on ESPN: Ngannou vs. Rozenstruik was a planned mixed martial arts event produced by the Ultimate Fighting Championship originally to take place on March 28, 2020 at Nationwide Arena in Columbus, Ohio, United States. Due to the COVID-19 pandemic, the event was eventually postponed (see section below).

== Background ==
The promotion was expected to return to Ohio for the first time since UFC 203 in 2016 and to Columbus for the first time in over 11 years, since UFC 96 in 2009. Zuffa previously hosted a World Extreme Cagefighting event, WEC 47, at the venue in March 2010.

A heavyweight bout between former UFC Heavyweight Championship challenger Francis Ngannou and Jairzinho Rozenstruik was expected to headline the event.

Punahele Soriano was briefly linked to a middleweight bout with Eric Spicely at the event. However, Soriano was removed from the card for undisclosed reasons and replaced by Roman Kopylov.

Philip Rowe was briefly linked to a welterweight bout with Laureano Staropoli at the event. However, Rowe was removed from the card in late February for undisclosed reasons and replaced by Khaos Williams.

Carlos Felipe was expected to face Jeff Hughes in a heavyweight bout at the event. However, Felipe was removed from the card in late February for undisclosed reasons and replaced by Tanner Boser.

The Ultimate Fighter: Team Rousey vs. Team Tate bantamweight winner Julianna Peña was expected to face Aspen Ladd at the event. However, Peña pulled out of the fight in early March citing an injury. In turn, promotion officials elected to remove Ladd from the card entirely and the pairing is expected to be rescheduled at a future event.

A bantamweight bout between former UFC Bantamweight Champion Cody Garbrandt and Raphael Assunção was scheduled for the event. However, Garbrandt pulled out on March 12 due to kidney issues.

=== COVID-19 pandemic ===
Due to the COVID-19 pandemic, Ohio governor Mike DeWine issued an order restricting mass gatherings and sporting events on March 12, thus the UFC decided to move the event to Las Vegas where it would take place behind closed doors at the UFC APEX facility, which the organisation owns and is home of training and production facilities. UFC president Dana White then announced on March 15 that this event would have to be moved once again as the Nevada State Athletic Commission (NSAC) decided to provisionally ban events until March 25, when a new meeting would discuss future plans in what could jeopardize this event's realization. On March 16, it was confirmed that the event was postponed after a letter from White to employees was shared to the public. This was the first time that the promotion was forced to cancel events due to vis major. The UFC also cancelled two events scheduled for March 21 and April 11. White assured on March 24 that all cancelled fights will be rescheduled for future events.

== Cancelled fight card ==
Fight card
Weight class				Method	Round	Time	Notes
Heavyweight	Francis Ngannou	vs.	Jairzinho Rozenstruik				(Note: Moved to UFC 249.)
Welterweight	Matt Brown	vs.	Miguel Baeza				(Note: Moved to UFC on ESPN: Overeem vs. Harris)
Heavyweight	Greg Hardy	vs.	Yorgan de Castro				(Note: Moved to UFC 249.)
Light Heavyweight	Sam Alvey	vs.	Khalil Rountree Jr.				(Note: Alvey later booked to face Ryan Spann at UFC 249.)
Bantamweight	Cody Stamann	vs.	Raoni Barcelos
Bantamweight	Louis Smolka	vs.	Davey Grant				(Note: Smolka later booked to face Casey Kenney at UFC on ESPN: Woodley vs. Burns.)
Bantamweight	Marlon Vera	vs.	Eddie Wineland				(Note: Vera later booked to face former UFC Flyweight Championship challenger Ray Borg at UFC 249.)
Welterweight	Laureano Staropoli	vs.	Khaos Williams
Women's Strawweight	Tecia Torres	vs.	Mizuki Inoue
Middleweight	Eric Spicely	vs.	Roman Kopylov
Heavyweight	Jeff Hughes	vs.	Tanner Boser
Bantamweight	Martin Day	vs.	Randy Costa

== See also ==
- List of UFC events
- List of current UFC fighters
- 2020 in UFC
