= Yu Zaiqing =

Chinese sports administrator (born 1951)

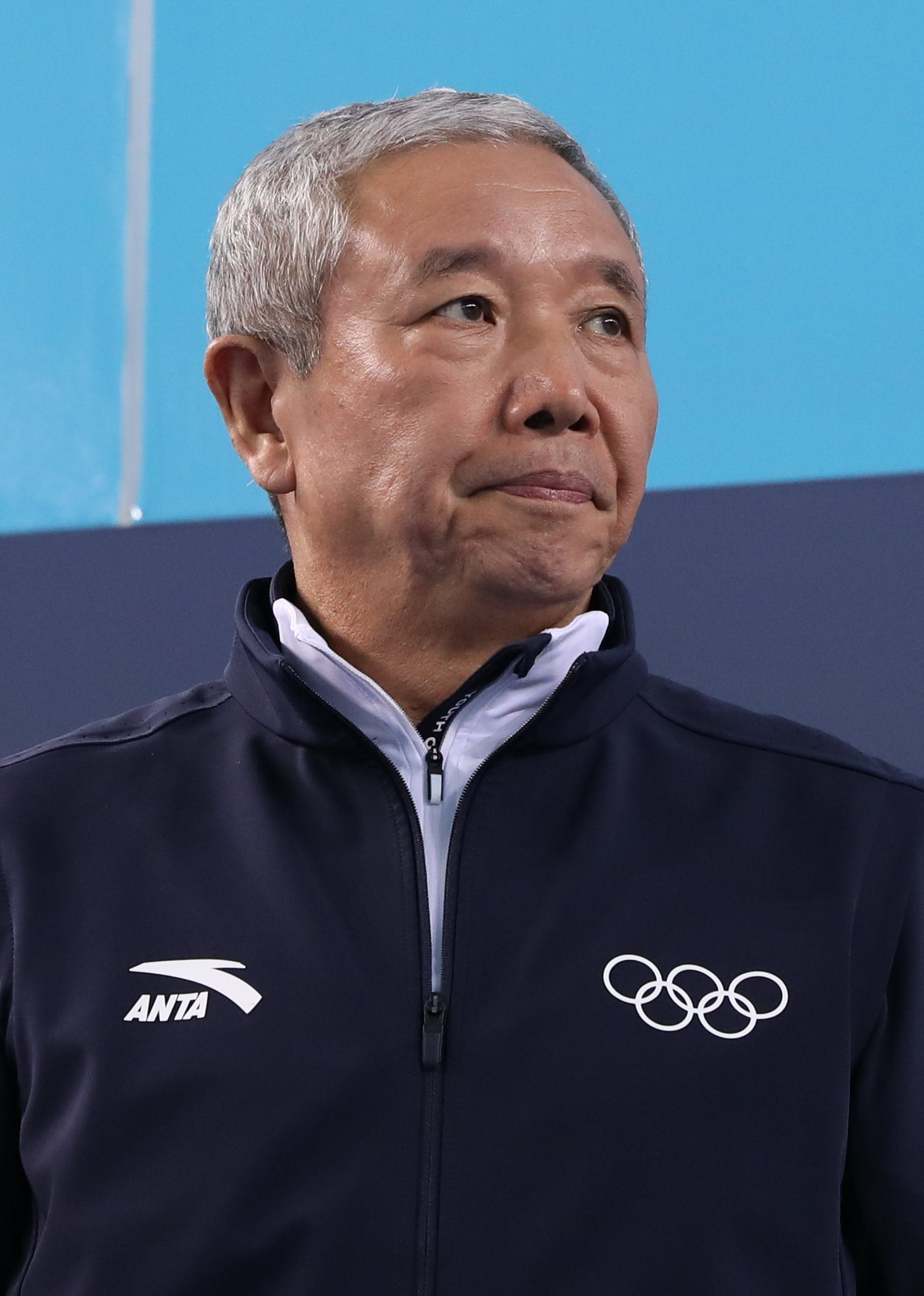
- IOC Vice-President Yu Zaiqing at the Victory Ceremony for the Girls' 3m Springboard Diving at the 2018 Buenos Aires Summer Youth Olympic Games held in Buenos Aires.

Vice-President of the International Olympic Committee
- In office 2008–2021
- IOC President: Jacques Rogge (2008-12); Thomas Bach (2014-2021)

Executive Board Member of the International Olympic Committee
- In office 2004–2008
- IOC President: Jacques Rogge (2004-08)
- Preceded by: He Zhenliang

President of the International Wushu Federation
- In office 2003–2019
- Succeeded by: Gou Zhongwen

Personal details
- Born: 26 April 1951 (age 75) Bin County, Heilongjiang, China
- Party: Chinese Communist Party
- Education: Nankai University (BA); Osaka University of Foreign Studies
- Occupation: Sports administrator

Yu Zaiqing (Simplified Chinese: 于再清, born 26 April 1951) is a Chinese sports administrator, a member of the executive board of the International Olympic Committee (IOC) since 2000, and a vice-president from 2008 to 2012, and since February 2014.

He has a bachelor's degree from Nankai University.
