= UFC Fight Night: Smith vs. Teixeira =

UFC mixed martial arts event in 2020

- The poster for UFC Fight Night: Smith vs. Teixeira
- Promotion: Ultimate Fighting Championship
- Date: May 13, 2020
- Venue: VyStar Veterans Memorial Arena
- City: Jacksonville, Florida, United States
- Attendance: None (behind closed doors)

Event chronology
UFC 249: Ferguson vs. Gaethje	UFC Fight Night: Smith vs. Teixeira	UFC on ESPN: Overeem vs. Harris

UFC Fight Night: Smith vs. Teixeira (also known as UFC Fight Night 171 and UFC on ESPN+ 29) was a mixed martial arts event produced by the Ultimate Fighting Championship that took place on May 13, 2020 at VyStar Veterans Memorial Arena in Jacksonville, Florida, United States.

== Background ==
Due to the COVID-19 pandemic, the UFC had to cancel two events and postpone four events between March 21 and May 2. On April 24, they announced their return of UFC 249 in Jacksonville, Florida, with two other events scheduled for the same venue on May 13 and May 16 respectively.

A light heavyweight bout between former UFC Light Heavyweight Championship challengers Anthony Smith and Glover Teixeira served as the event headliner. They were originally scheduled to headline another event on April 25, but it was cancelled due to the ongoing pandemic.

The event included fighters that were pulled from other events previously cancelled, as well as the following bouts:

- A middleweight bout between Karl Roberson and Marvin Vettori (also scheduled for the cancelled event on April 25 in Lincoln, Nebraska).
- A heavyweight bout between former UFC Heavyweight Champion Andrei Arlovski and Philipe Lins (scheduled for UFC Fight Night: Hermansson vs. Weidman).
- A women's bantamweight bout between Sijara Eubanks and Sarah Moras (scheduled for the original UFC 249 on April 18 in Brooklyn, New York).

At the weigh-ins, Roberson weighed in at 187.5 pounds, one and a half pounds over the middleweight non-title fight limit. He was fined 20% of his purse, which went to his opponent Vettori and the bout was expected to proceed at a catchweight. However, the bout was cancelled on the day of the event due to medical issues caused by Roberson's attempt to cut weight.

== Results ==
Main card (ESPN+)
Weight class				Method	Round	Time	Notes
Light Heavyweight	Glover Teixeira	def.	Anthony Smith	TKO (punches)	5	1:04
Heavyweight	Ben Rothwell	def.	Ovince Saint Preux	Decision (split) (28–29, 29–28, 29–28)	3	5:00
Lightweight	Drew Dober	def.	Alexander Hernandez	TKO (punches)	2	4:25
Bantamweight	Ricky Simón	def.	Ray Borg	Decision (split) (28–29, 29–28, 29–28)	3	5:00
Heavyweight	Andrei Arlovski	def.	Philipe Lins	Decision (unanimous) (30–27, 30–27, 29–28)	3	5:00
Lightweight	Thiago Moisés	def.	Michael Johnson	Submission (achilles lock)	2	0:25
Preliminary Card (ESPN+)
Women's Bantamweight	Sijara Eubanks	def.	Sarah Moras	Decision (unanimous) (30–27, 30–27, 30–26)	3	5:00
Lightweight	Omar Morales	def.	Gabriel Benítez	Decision (unanimous) (30–27, 29–28, 29–28)	3	5:00
Featherweight	Brian Kelleher	def.	Hunter Azure	KO (punches)	2	3:40
Heavyweight	Chase Sherman	def.	Ike Villanueva	TKO (elbow and punches)	2	0:49

== Bonus awards ==
The following fighters received $50,000 bonuses.

- Fight of the Night: Brian Kelleher vs. Hunter Azure
- Performance of the Night: Glover Teixeira and Drew Dober

== Reported payout ==
The following is the reported payout to the fighters as reported to the Florida State Boxing Commission. It does not include sponsor money and also does not include the UFC's traditional "fight night" bonuses. The total disclosed payout for the event was $1,175,000.

- Glover Teixeira: $230,000 def. Anthony Smith: $130,000
- Ben Rothwell: $260,000 def. Ovince Saint Preux: $95,000
- Drew Dober: $166,000 def. Alexander Hernandez: $36,000
- Ricky Simón: $60,000 def. Ray Borg: $46,000
- Andrei Arlovski: $325,000 def. Philipe Lins: $80,000
- Thiago Moisés: $24,000 def. Michael Johnson: $83,000
- Sijara Eubanks: $66,000 def. Sarah Moras: $23,000
- Omar Morales: $24,000 def. Gabriel Benítez: $40,000
- Brian Kelleher: $60,000 def. Hunter Azure: $12,000
- Chase Sherman: $28,000 def. Ike Villanueva: $12,000

== Aftermath ==
On October 20, it was announced that the United States Anti-Doping Agency (USADA) issued a nine-month suspension for Chase Sherman, after he tested positive for anastrozole as the result of an in-competition sample.

== See also ==
- List of UFC events
- List of current UFC fighters
- 2020 in UFC
