= UFC 249 =

UFC mixed martial arts event in 2020

UFC 249: Ferguson vs. Gaethje
- The poster for UFC 249: Ferguson vs. Gaethje
- Promotion: Ultimate Fighting Championship
- Date: May 9, 2020
- Venue: VyStar Veterans Memorial Arena
- City: Jacksonville, Florida, United States
- Attendance: None (behind closed doors)
- Buyrate: 700,000

Event chronology
UFC Fight Night: Hermansson vs. Weidman	UFC 249: Ferguson vs. Gaethje	UFC Fight Night: Smith vs. Teixeira

UFC 249: Ferguson vs. Gaethje was a mixed martial arts event produced by the Ultimate Fighting Championship that took place on May 9, 2020 at VyStar Veterans Memorial Arena in Jacksonville, Florida, United States. It was originally planned to take place on April 18 at Barclays Center in Brooklyn, New York, United States. Due to the COVID-19 pandemic, the event was eventually postponed (see section below). On April 21, the UFC confirmed that UFC 249 would be moved to May 9 and take place in Florida.

== Background ==
A UFC Lightweight Championship bout between the champion Khabib Nurmagomedov and interim champion Tony Ferguson (also The Ultimate Fighter: Team Lesnar vs. Team dos Santos welterweight winner) was slated to headline this event. The pairing had previously been scheduled and cancelled for various reasons on four occasions (The Ultimate Fighter: Team McGregor vs. Team Faber Finale, UFC on Fox: Teixeira vs. Evans, UFC 209 and UFC 223) over the last four years. The bout was cancelled for a fifth time due to issues related to the COVID-19 pandemic (see section below).

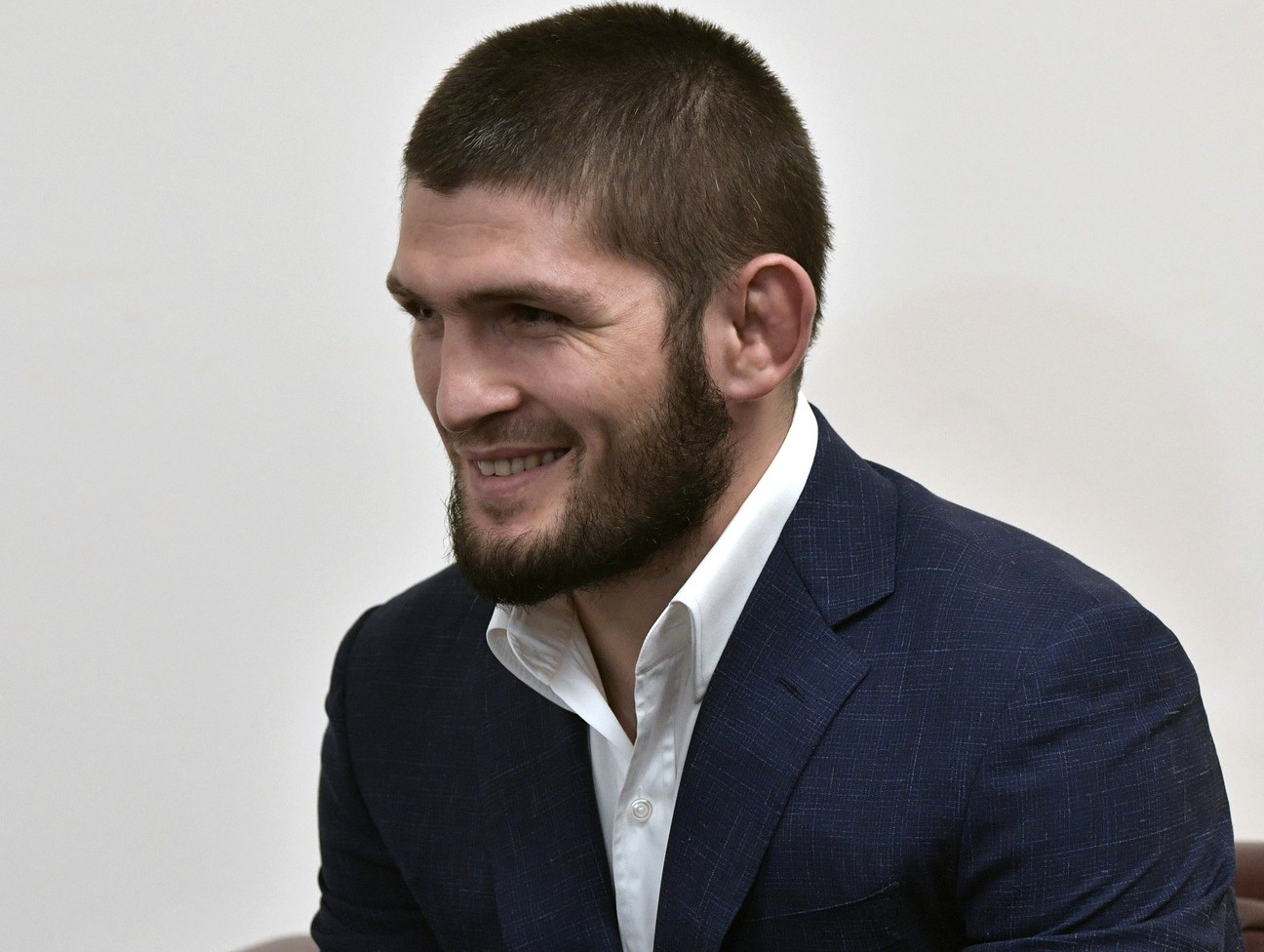
Originally, Khabib Nurmagomedov was expected to make the third defense of his UFC Lightweight Championship at this event, but had to pull out due to travel restrictions related to the COVID-19 pandemic.

A featherweight bout between Jeremy Stephens and Calvin Kattar was expected to take place at UFC 248. However, Stephens was removed from the card in mid-January with an injury. The pairing was rescheduled for this event.

A heavyweight bout between Shamil Abdurakhimov and Ciryl Gane was scheduled for the event. However, it was announced on March 5 that Gane was forced to pull out of the event after he was struck by a pneumothorax in training and the bout was eventually scrapped.

A welterweight bout between former Bellator Welterweight Champion Lyman Good and Belal Muhammad was scheduled for this event. The pairing was previously expected to meet at UFC 205 in November 2016, but Good was pulled from that event after being notified by the United States Anti-Doping Agency (USADA) due to a potential anti-doping violation stemming from an out-of-competition drug test. However, Good pulled out due to injury on April 4 and the bout was scrapped. It was announced on April 20 that Good actually tested positive for COVID-19, being the first fighter to publicly acknowledge the fact.

A women's strawweight rematch between former UFC Women's Strawweight Champions Jéssica Andrade and Rose Namajunas was expected to co-headline the event. The pairing previously met at UFC 237 in May 2019, where Andrade won via second round TKO to capture the title. However, Namajunas pulled out on April 8 for personal reasons, with her manager citing a pair of deaths in the family related to the COVID-19 pandemic as the reason.

=== COVID-19 pandemic – the April 18 date is postponed ===
On March 12, New York governor Andrew Cuomo issued an order restricting mass gatherings and sporting events due to the COVID-19 pandemic. Four days later, UFC president Dana White announced via a letter to employees shared to the public that this event "is still scheduled as planned, but the location may change". On March 18, the New York State Athletic Commission (NYSAC) announced that the event would not be sanctioned to take place at the event's original site, the Barclays Center in Brooklyn. On March 23, White revealed that he already had a new location for this event, but would only confirm that it will be held behind closed doors. White subsequently added on March 25 that the card could feature a different lineup, depending on the logistics.

Khabib Nurmagomedov stated on March 30 that he was in Dagestan and his participation at the event could be jeopardized due to travel restrictions related to the COVID-19 pandemic. He stated on April 1 that he would probably not be competing at the event and reinforced that people should be in quarantine anyhow. He later confirmed that he would compete if a location was given and they were able to move him there, but did not see it happening.

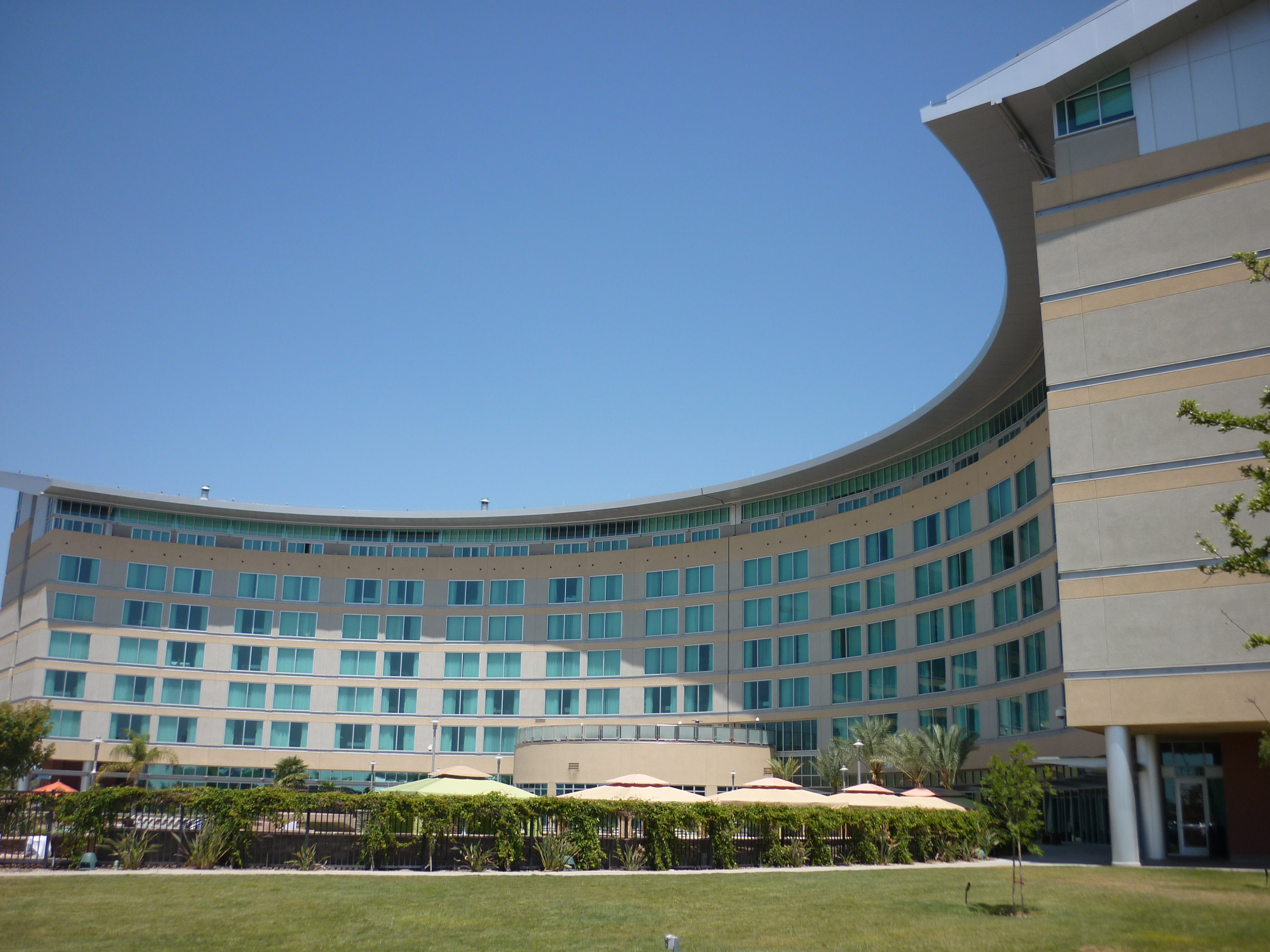
Since Tachi Palace Hotel & Casino in Lemoore, California is located on land owned by the Tachi-Yokut Tribe, part of the Santa Rosa Indian Community, the event did not fall under the jurisdiction of the California State Athletic Commission (CSAC) and their ban on combat sports events through the end of May.

The UFC announced on April 6 that Nurmagomedov would be replaced by former WSOF Lightweight Champion Justin Gaethje, with an interim title to be disputed between him and Tony Ferguson. The rest of the card also underwent changes, with the following fights being added as well:

- A heavyweight bout between former UFC Heavyweight Championship challenger Francis Ngannou and Jairzinho Rozenstruik. The bout was originally scheduled to headline UFC on ESPN: Ngannou vs. Rozenstruik on March 28, but the event was cancelled due to the pandemic.
- A heavyweight bout between Greg Hardy and Yorgan De Castro; the bout was originally scheduled for UFC on ESPN: Ngannou vs. Rozenstruik.
- A welterweight rematch between Vicente Luque and Niko Price; both fighters were expected to face different opponents at UFC Fight Night: Overeem vs. Harris. They first met at UFC Fight Night: Brunson vs. Machida in October 2017, where Luque won via second round submission.
- Islam Makhachev was expected to face Alexander Hernandez in a lightweight bout, but was removed from the event due to travel restrictions and replaced by Omar Morales.
- A bantamweight bout between Marlon Vera and former UFC Flyweight Championship challenger Ray Borg; Vera was expected to compete against a different opponent at UFC on ESPN: Ngannou vs. Rozenstruik.
- Ottman Azaitar was expected to face Khama Worthy in a lightweight bout, but was removed from the event due to travel restrictions and replaced by Michael Johnson.
- A light heavyweight bout between Ryan Spann and Sam Alvey; Alvey was expected to compete against a different opponent at UFC on ESPN: Ngannou vs. Rozenstruik.

A light heavyweight bout between Magomed Ankalaev and Ion Cuțelaba (a rematch from their meeting at UFC Fight Night: Benavidez vs. Figueiredo) was removed. The fight was rescheduled and took place at UFC 254.

The following fights were removed from the event and were never rescheduled for future cards:

- A heavyweight bout between Ben Rothwell and Gian Villante.
- A middleweight bout between Karl Roberson and Makhmud Muradov.
- A bantamweight bout between Hunter Azure and Umar Nurmagomedov.

A location for the event was not revealed, but Dana White said the UFC's temporary home would host U.S.-based fighters who aren't barred from traveling domestically. On April 7, Secretary of the Florida Department of Business and Professional Regulation Halsey Beshears made a post on Twitter, offering to help sanction and host UFC events in the state. It was later revealed that the event was expected to take place at Tachi Palace Hotel & Casino in Lemoore, California, the site of several events for the defunct World Extreme Cagefighting and Tachi Palace Fights promotions.

On April 9, White announced that this event would not take place as scheduled and all other UFC events would be suspended until further notice, citing interventions from high-ranking staff of the UFC's U.S. media rightsholders, ESPN Inc. and parent The Walt Disney Company. It was later revealed that the 40th governor of California, Gavin Newsom, influenced the decision of cancelling the event.

=== May 9 – a new date is set for the event ===
The promotion originally planned UFC 250 to take place at Ginásio do Ibirapuera in São Paulo, Brazil on May 9. On April 7, it was announced that the venue would be used as a field hospital during the COVID-19 pandemic in Brazil and would not be able to host the fight card.

A UFC Bantamweight Championship bout between the current champion Henry Cejudo (also former UFC Flyweight Champion and 2008 Olympic gold medalist in freestyle wrestling) and former WEC and two-time UFC Featherweight Champion José Aldo was expected to serve as that event's headliner. However, Aldo withdrew on April 8 due to visa issues as the event was expected to be moved to the United States. While not officially announced by the promotion at the time, former two-time bantamweight champion Dominick Cruz (who hadn't fought since December 2016) was expected to replace him.

A UFC Women's Featherweight Championship bout between the current champion Amanda Nunes (also the current UFC Women's Bantamweight Champion) and former Invicta FC Featherweight Champion Felicia Spencer was expected to serve as the co-headliner. Nunes announced on April 20 that she would not compete on this date due to her desire to have a full training camp.

Due to the event being expected to be relocated to the United States, several changes were made due to fighters being unable to compete due to visa issues:

- A light heavyweight bout between the former UFC Light Heavyweight Champion Maurício Rua (also 2005 PRIDE Middleweight Grand Prix Champion) and Antônio Rogério Nogueira was cancelled. The pairing previously met at PRIDE Critical Countdown 2005 and UFC 190, with Rua winning both fights.
- Ketlen Vieira, who was expected to face Marion Reneau in a women's bantamweight bout.
- Former bantamweight title challenger Bethe Correia, who was expected to face Pannie Kianzad in a women's bantamweight bout.
- Augusto Sakai, who was expected to face former WSOF Heavyweight Champion Blagoy Ivanov in a heavyweight bout.
- Carlos Felipe, who was expected to face Sergey Spivak in a heavyweight bout.

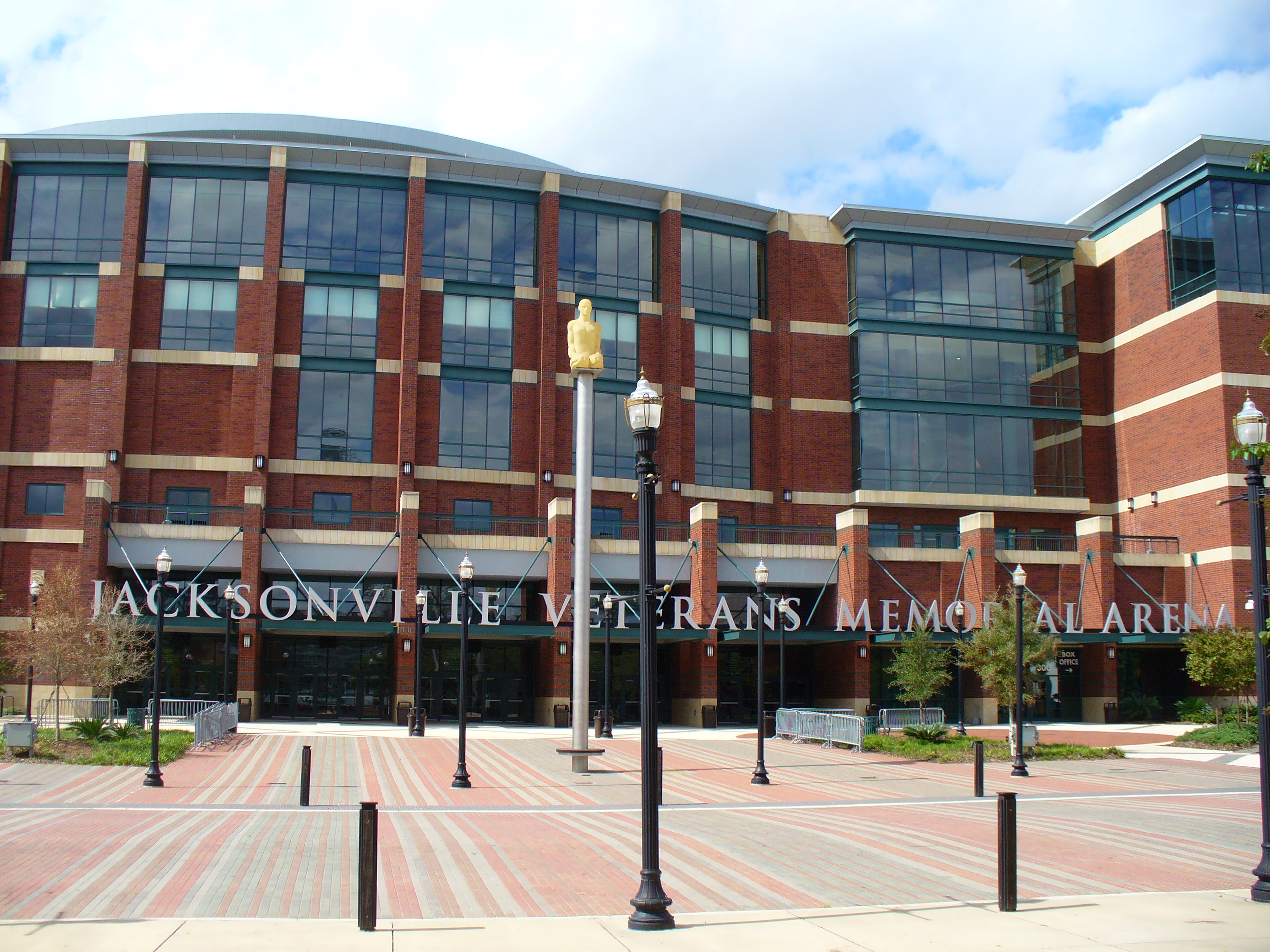
VyStar Veterans Memorial Arena hosted the much anticipated return of the UFC amid the COVID-19 pandemic.

On April 21, it was announced that the UFC moved UFC 249 to the new date, marking the promotion's return after the first wave of cancellations, most likely in Florida. Florida venues are permitted to host UFC events behind closed doors as a result of Executive Order 20-91 signed April 9, 2020 by governor Ron DeSantis, specifically stating as an essential service, "employees at a professional sports and media production with a national audience - including any athletes, entertainers, production team, executive team, media team and any others necessary to facilitate including services supporting such production - only if the location is closed to the general public." They confirmed the new card on April 24, with the Ferguson vs. Gaethje bout still scheduled to serve as the event headliner. The organization also announced that it would host two other events on May 13 and 16, both in Jacksonville. The rest of the card featured the following fights:

- A women's strawweight bout between former Invicta FC and inaugural UFC Women's Strawweight Champion Carla Esparza and former Invicta FC Atomweight Champion Michelle Waterson. The bout was originally scheduled for UFC Fight Night: Overeem vs. Harris on April 11, one of the first events cancelled due to the pandemic.
- A featherweight bout between Bryce Mitchell and Charles Rosa. The bout was originally scheduled for UFC Fight Night: Hermansson vs. Weidman a week earlier.
- Bouts already scheduled for the original UFC 250 event on May 9 – the previously mentioned UFC Bantamweight Championship bout between Henry Cejudo and Dominick Cruz, as well as a heavyweight bout between former UFC Heavyweight Champion Fabrício Werdum and Aleksei Oleinik.
- A welterweight rematch between former WEC and UFC Lightweight Champion Anthony Pettis and former lightweight title challenger Donald Cerrone. The pairing previously met in a lightweight bout at UFC on Fox: Johnson vs. Dodson in January 2013, where Pettis won via first round knockout.

Fights that were originally expected to take place at this event on April 18, but later expected to be rescheduled for future cards included Hernandez vs. Morales, Vera vs. Borg, Worthy vs. Johnson and a women's bantamweight bout between Sijara Eubanks and Sarah Moras.

At the weigh-ins, Jeremy Stephens weighed in at 150.5 pounds, four and a half pounds over the featherweight non-title fight limit. He was fined 30% of his purse and his bout with Calvin Kattar proceeded at a catchweight. Additionally, a middleweight bout between former Strikeforce Middleweight Champion Ronaldo Souza and Uriah Hall was cancelled after Souza and two of his cornermen tested positive for COVID-19.

== Results ==
Main card
Weight class				Method	Round	Time	Notes
Lightweight	Justin Gaethje	def.	Tony Ferguson	TKO (punch)	5	3:39	(Note: For the interim UFC Lightweight Championship.)
Bantamweight	Henry Cejudo (c)	def.	Dominick Cruz	TKO (knee and punches)	2	4:58	(Note: For the UFC Bantamweight Championship.)
Heavyweight	Francis Ngannou	def.	Jairzinho Rozenstruik	KO (punches)	1	0:20
Catchweight (150.5 lb)	Calvin Kattar	def.	Jeremy Stephens	KO (elbows)	2	2:49
Heavyweight	Greg Hardy	def.	Yorgan De Castro	Decision (unanimous) (30–27, 30–27, 30–27)	3	5:00
Preliminary Card (ESPN)
Welterweight	Anthony Pettis	def.	Donald Cerrone	Decision (unanimous) (29–28, 29–28, 29–28)	3	5:00
Heavyweight	Alexey Oleynik	def.	Fabrício Werdum	Decision (split) (28–29, 29–28, 29–28)	3	5:00
Women's Strawweight	Carla Esparza	def.	Michelle Waterson	Decision (split) (27–30, 29–28, 30–27)	3	5:00
Welterweight	Vicente Luque	def.	Niko Price	TKO (doctor stoppage)	3	3:37
Early Preliminary Card (ESPN)
Featherweight	Bryce Mitchell	def.	Charles Rosa	Decision (unanimous) (30–25, 30–25, 30–24)	3	5:00
Light Heavyweight	Ryan Spann	def.	Sam Alvey	Decision (split) (29–28, 28–29, 29–28)	3	5:00

== Bonus awards ==
The following fighters received $50,000 bonuses.

- Fight of the Night: Tony Ferguson vs. Justin Gaethje
- Performance of the Night: Justin Gaethje and Francis Ngannou

== Reported payout ==
The following is the reported payout to the fighters as reported to the Florida State Boxing Commission. It does not include sponsor money and also does not include the UFC's traditional "fight night" bonuses. The total disclosed payout for the event was $3,557,000.

- Justin Gaethje: $350,000 def. Tony Ferguson: $500,000
- Henry Cejudo: $350,000 def. Dominick Cruz: $300,000
- Francis Ngannou: $260,000 def. Jairzinho Rozenstruik: $80,000
- Calvin Kattar: $116,100 def. Jeremy Stephens: $46,900 ^
- Greg Hardy: $180,000 def. Yorgan de Castro: $12,000
- Anthony Pettis: $310,000 def. Donald Cerrone: $200,000
- Aleksei Oleinik: $160,000 def. Fabrício Werdum: $100,000
- Carla Esparza: $102,000 def. Michelle Waterson: $60,000
- Vicente Luque: $180,000 def. Niko Price: $57,000
- Bryce Mitchell: $54,000 def. Charles Rosa: $24,000
- Ryan Spann: $50,000 def. Sam Alvey: $65,000

^ Due to weighing in over the limit, 30% ($20,100) of Stephens' purse went to Kattar.

== Aftermath ==
During the broadcast, it was announced that former UFC Welterweight and Middleweight Champion Georges St-Pierre would be inducted into the Modern Wing of the UFC Hall of Fame.

Henry Cejudo announced his retirement immediately after his TKO victory over Dominick Cruz.

== See also ==
- List of UFC events
- List of current UFC fighters
- 2020 in UFC
