= Murder of Aniah Blanchard =

2019 homicide

- Family photo of Blanchard (left). Blanchard in the Chevron gas station before her disappearance (right)
- Date: October 2019
- Location: Alabama, United States
- Deaths: Aniah Blanchard
- Arrests: Three (charges against two suspects were dismissed)
- Convicted: Ibraheem Yazeed
- Charges: Capital murder during a kidnapping; Capital murder during a robbery; Capital murder involving a victim in a vehicle
- Verdict: Guilty of the lesser charges of murder and felony murder; Sentenced to life imprisonment

The murder of Aniah Blanchard occurred in October 2019. Blanchard, a 19-year-old college student, was reported missing on October 24. She had last been seen at a Chevron gas station in Auburn, Alabama, the previous night. A witness from the gas station claims to have seen Blanchard's kidnapping. Blanchard's body was found in Macon County, Alabama, one month after her disappearance.

The cause of death was determined to be a gunshot wound. A suspect, Ibraheem Yazeed—who was out on bail on charges of kidnapping, attempted murder, and robbery at the time of the murder—was arrested and charged with Blanchard's murder. Yazeed was indicted by a grand jury on three charges: capital murder during a kidnapping, capital murder during a robbery and capital murder involving a victim in a vehicle in November 2022. In March 2023, he pled not guilty to all charges. Yazeed was convicted of the lesser charges of murder and felony murder on March 19, 2026. Up until the trial verdict, prosecutors sought the death penalty. Yazeed was, in the end, sentenced to life in prison on May 7, 2026.

Blanchard's death attracted national attention and media coverage. The killing led to the creation of Aniah's Law, which reforms Alabama's bail system.

== Background ==
Aniah Blanchard
- Born: Aniah Haley Blanchard; June 22, 2000; Northport, Alabama
- Disappeared: October 23, 2019; Auburn, Alabama
- Died: 2019
- Cause of death: Gunshot wound
- Body discovered: November 25, 2019
- Resting place: Haley Cemetery; Thornhill, Marion County, Alabama, USA
- Education: Southern Union State Community College
- Occupation: Student
- Parents: Elijah Blanchard (father); Angela Haley-Harris (mother)
- Relatives: Walt Harris (stepfather)

Aniah Haley Blanchard (born June 22, 2000) was from Homewood, Alabama. She was the daughter of Elijah Blanchard, a Birmingham businessman, and Angela Haley-Harris, a registered nurse. Haley-Harris is currently married to former UFC heavyweight fighter Walt Harris. Blanchard graduated from Homewood High School, where she played softball. At the time of her death, she was a student at Southern Union State Community College and was studying early childhood education. She was planning to transfer to Auburn University.

== Disappearance ==
Blanchard was reported missing to the Auburn Police Department on October 24, 2019. She had last been seen by a family member on the evening of October 23. Blanchard and her roommate exchanged several Snapchat messages in the late-night hours. At 11:09 p.m., Blanchard informed her roommate that she was close to being home. At 11:40, Blanchard told her roommate that she was with a man named Eric, whom she had just met. Blanchard's phone activity ended at 11:47 p.m. On June 3, 2020, Auburn police detective Josh Mixon testified at a preliminary hearing that the phone died or was powered off in the area of the Clarion Inn on South College Street. Blanchard's roommate and parents found her behavior to be "uncharacteristic", and it is unknown whether Blanchard wrote the final Snapchat message herself.

Surveillance video showed Blanchard in the Chevron gas station in Auburn in the late-night hours of October 23. Though Blanchard's phone has not been recovered, police were able to use records to trace some of her phone's movement. Blanchard's vehicle was last seen on video on a tag reader near Interstate 85, just south of Veterans Boulevard and South College Street.

=== Search and investigation ===
Blanchard's disappearance resulted in an extensive search effort. By October 30, a task force of several law enforcement agencies—including the FBI, the Department of Homeland Security, and the Alabama Department of Forensic Sciences—was formed. The disappearance and the subsequent search received national media coverage. On October 25, authorities found Blanchard's damaged vehicle. The black 2017 Honda CR-V, which police reported had seemed to be "in disarray," had been abandoned near an apartment complex in Montgomery and contained evidence of "foul play"—specifically, blood in the front passenger's seat. The blood, which was confirmed by the Alabama Department of Forensic Sciences to be that of Blanchard, "was indicative of someone suffering a life-threatening injury." In addition to blood, investigators found a bullet hole in the passenger side door and shell casings in the left cup holder. Police also reported that there was an odor in the car of cleaning solution.

On November 6, the Auburn Police Department released an image from a surveillance video of a "person of interest." The following day, that person was identified as 29-year-old Ibraheem Yazeed of Montgomery. Surveillance video showed that he was in the store at the same time as Blanchard. He is seen buying alcohol and looking in Blanchard's direction. He was also captured exiting the passenger side of Blanchard's vehicle. Surveillance video from another gas station showed him re-entering the passenger's side of her car. Blanchard and Yazeed are then seen leaving the station together. In addition to surveillance footage, a witness allegedly saw Blanchard and Yazeed interacting outside the store near her car. The witness also claimed to have seen Yazeed force her into the car and then leave with her in the vehicle. According to detectives, the witness told a companion about the event but was told to mind his business. Yazeed allegedly told another witness that he had Blanchard's vehicle but would not allow the witness to see Blanchard at that time. The witness also claims that Yazeed said he shot a girl after she "went for the gun." At the time of Blanchard's death, Yazeed was free on a $295,000 bond, having been charged with possession of marijuana, robbery, kidnapping, and attempted murder. Those charges were connected to an alleged crime in January 2019, during which four assailants robbed and beat two men in a hotel in Montgomery. One of the victims, a 77-year-old man, was reportedly left "unconscious, unresponsive, severely injured and near death." The suspect is also accused of attempting to kill two police officers in 2012 by ramming his car into theirs and was arrested in 2017 for aggravated battery on a police officer. In June 2020, Yazeed was charged with the 2018 murder of Stephen Hamby. He was also charged with the attempted murder of a woman who was shot in the face during the incident in which Hamby was killed.

== Arrests ==
On November 7, police issued an arrest warrant for Yazeed on suspicion of first-degree kidnapping. A tip led police to Pensacola, Florida; and the Florida Regional Fugitive Task Force located him near Interstate 10's Pine Forest Road exit. The suspect fled on foot and refused to comply with Marshall's verbal commands, leading them to "physically remove him from his hiding spot." He was taken to the Escambia County Jail and subsequently agreed to be extradited back to Alabama. He has been held in the Lee County Jail without bond since then. He was moved to solitary confinement after his attorneys filed court documents claiming that he was facing death threats. A judge determined that there was enough probable cause to proceed to grand jury hearings. The judge also issued a gag order preventing Yazeed's attorneys, prosecutors, and witnesses from speaking to the media about the case.

On November 22, police arrested Antwain "Squirmy" Fisher, alleging that he disposed of evidence and provided transportation for Yazeed. Fisher had previously served three years in prison for his part in a drug-deal-related murder. On November 25, police arrested a third suspect, David Johnson Jr., and charged him with hindering prosecution. Charges against Fisher and Johnson were later dismissed. In regards to the dismissal of Fisher's charges, District Attorney Brandon Hughes stated that "it was determined that Mr. Fisher's conduct did not rise to the level of accomplice liability as was originally charged and as is required under Alabama law." In June 2020, it was revealed that Fisher had spoken to investigators about the crime. According to Fisher, Yazeed came to the home of David Johnson Sr., on October 24, 2019, between around 5:00 a.m. and 6:00 a.m. Fisher claimed to have seen Blanchard's vehicle parked near some bushes during this time. Yazeed allegedly told Fisher that he needed more gas for Blanchard's vehicle. Fisher took Yazeed to the gas station where they purchased gasoline before going back to Johnson's residence. Yazeed allegedly informed Fisher that he needed to pick something up and Fisher drove him north on Interstate 85 towards Shorter. Fisher said that the pair stopped in Montgomery, where Yazeed obtained the item he wanted, a type of assault rifle. The two then allegedly went to a cemetery off I-85. There, Fisher claimed to have seen Yazeed drag what appeared to be two legs wrapped in a comforter. Yazeed is said to have spent some time in the woods before returning to the vehicle. Fisher said he confronted Yazeed, saying something to the effect of "tell me that's not a body,” to which Yazeed replied, "it won't come back on you and your family.”

=== Body discovery ===
On November 25, human remains were found in Macon County, in the woods off County Road 2. Investigators discovered a skull, which appeared to have a bullet hole in the top. Along with the remains was clothing similar to what Blanchard had last been seen wearing, as well as a lead projectile. On November 27, the remains were identified as Blanchard's. An autopsy determined that Blanchard was killed by a gunshot wound. The charges against Yazeed were then upgraded from first-degree kidnapping to capital murder. He faced two counts of capital murder, one for committing a murder in a car through the use of a deadly weapon while the victim is in a vehicle, and the other for committing a murder during a kidnapping in the first degree. District Attorney Hughes's office sought the death penalty. A preliminary hearing was postponed several times due to the COVID-19 outbreak. The hearing took place in June, at which Auburn police detective Josh Mixon gave testimony about the case. Defense attorneys disputed the prosecution's claim that the crime was committed in Lee County. Upon hearing the evidence, Judge Russell Bush found probable cause to send the case to a Lee County Grand Jury.

In March, Yazeed had allegedly assaulted several corrections officers while in custody. He was charged with second-degree assault.

== Aftermath and trial ==
Blanchard's disappearance and death attracted national attention and media coverage. Alabama Governor Kay Ivey issued a proclamation authorizing a $5,000 reward for information leading to an arrest and conviction. UFC president Dana White pledged an additional $25,000 to Ivey's award, and an anonymous source offered $5,000. The reward later rose to over $105,000, with much of the money coming from the UFC and UFC supporters.

Blanchard's death led to the creation of Aniah's Law, which reforms Alabama's bail laws, since her accused killer, Ibraheem Yazeed, had been free on bail when Aniah was murdered. Alabama's Constitution guarantees the right to bail for all defendants, except those charged with capital offenses. Yazeed had been granted bail after being charged with kidnapping and attempted murder, which are not capital offenses. Aniah's Law would expand the exception to other serious crimes including arson, burglary, domestic violence, aggravated child abuse, assault, robbery, kidnapping, human trafficking, rape, sodomy, sexual torture, terrorism, and murder. Prosecutors would be allowed to request a hearing regarding bail, which a judge could grant or deny. If the hearing is held, the defendant would be allowed to testify, present witnesses, and cross-examine witnesses. Prosecutors would have to demonstrate that the defendant is a flight risk or a threat to the safety of the community. The judge could choose to either allow or deny bail.

Blanchard's parents and step-parents have spoken to legislators in support of the law. In February 2020, the Alabama House of Representatives voted 104–0 in favor of Aniah's Law. In April 2021, the Alabama Senate passed it by a vote of 30 to 0. In June 2021, Governor Kay Ivey signed Aniah's Law. On November 8, 2022, Aniah's Law, House Bill 81, was passed by Alabama voters.

A scholarship in Blanchard's memory has been established by Homewood Public Schools. In June 2020, a bench at the Patriot Park in Homewood was dedicated to her.

In March 2026, Ibraheem Yazeed was convicted of murder and felony murder charges rather than capital murder. As a result, he will no longer face the death penalty.

On May 7, 2026, Yazeed was sentenced to two concurrent terms of life imprisonment with the possibility of parole for both counts of murder and felony murder.

== See also ==
- List of kidnappings
- Lists of solved missing person cases
- Killing of Shanquella Robinson
