= UFC on ESPN: Overeem vs. Harris =

UFC mixed martial arts event in 2020

- The poster for UFC on ESPN: Overeem vs. Harris
- Promotion: Ultimate Fighting Championship
- Date: May 16, 2020
- Venue: VyStar Veterans Memorial Arena
- City: Jacksonville, Florida, United States
- Attendance: None (behind closed doors)

Event chronology
UFC Fight Night: Smith vs. Teixeira	UFC on ESPN: Overeem vs. Harris	UFC on ESPN: Woodley vs. Burns

UFC on ESPN: Overeem vs. Harris (also known as UFC on ESPN 8) was a mixed martial arts event produced by the Ultimate Fighting Championship that took place on May 16, 2020 at VyStar Veterans Memorial Arena in Jacksonville, Florida, United States. It was originally planned to take place as a Fight Night on ESPN+ at Pechanga Arena in San Diego, California. Due to the COVID-19 pandemic, UFC president Dana White announced on April 9 that starting with UFC 249, all future events were indefinitely postponed (see section below). On April 24, the event was confirmed for Jacksonville on its original date.

== Background ==
While not officially announced by the organization, the promotion was targeting a lightweight bout between former interim UFC Lightweight Champion Dustin Poirier and Dan Hooker to serve as the event headliner. However, it was reported on April 8 that the main event was expected to be a heavyweight bout between the 2010 K-1 World Grand Prix Champion, former Strikeforce Heavyweight Champion and UFC Heavyweight Championship challenger Alistair Overeem and Walt Harris. The pairing was previously scheduled to headline UFC on ESPN: Overeem vs. Rozenstruik on December 7, 2019 but Harris pulled out of the fight in early November, citing the disappearance and death of his stepdaughter in her home state of Alabama. They were later booked to headline UFC Fight Night: Overeem vs. Harris on April 11, but the event was cancelled due to the COVID-19 pandemic.

Punahele Soriano was expected to face Anthony Hernandez at the event. However, Soriano pulled out due to undisclosed reasons. Hernandez instead faced Kevin Holland.

Due to travel restrictions related to the COVID-19 pandemic, some Brazilian fighters were unable to compete due to visa issues at the original event – Lara Procópio (who was expected to face Cortney Casey in a women's flyweight bout), former KSW Women's Flyweight Champion Ariane Lipski and Luana Carolina (who were expected to meet at the same weight).

=== COVID-19 pandemic ===
The event was originally expected to take place at Pechanga Arena in San Diego, California. On April 2, the California Department of Consumer Affairs, the division of the state government that includes the California State Athletic Commission (CSAC), extended a ban on combat sports events through the end of May due to the COVID-19 pandemic, making the venue unable to host the fight card. The event was officially removed from California on April 20. On April 24, the UFC confirmed the new UFC 249 for May 9 in Jacksonville, Florida, along with two other events on May 13 and 16 for the same location.

The UFC confirmed on May 1 that Overeem and Harris would headline this event, to be broadcast on ESPN. It included fighters that were pulled from other events previously cancelled, as well as the following bouts:

- A middleweight bout between Eryk Anders and Krzysztof Jotko (also scheduled for UFC Fight Night: Overeem vs. Harris).
- A heavyweight bout between Rodrigo Nascimento and Don'Tale Mayes (scheduled for UFC Fight Night: Smith vs. Teixeira on April 25).

Some fights that were originally expected to take place at this event on its first booking, but will be rescheduled for future cards include a flyweight bout between Alex Perez and Kai Kara-France, as well as a featherweight bout between Jared Gordon and Matt Sayles.

Mike Davis was scheduled to face Giga Chikadze at the event. However, Davis was removed from the card on May 14 and replaced by promotional newcomer Irwin Rivera.

== Results ==
Main Card (ESPN)
Weight class				Method	Round	Time	Notes
Heavyweight	Alistair Overeem	def.	Walt Harris	TKO (punches)	2	3:00
Women's Strawweight	Cláudia Gadelha	def.	Angela Hill	Decision (split) (28–29, 29–28, 29–28)	3	5:00
Featherweight	Dan Ige	def.	Edson Barboza	Decision (split) (28–29, 29–28, 29–28)	3	5:00
Middleweight	Krzysztof Jotko	def.	Eryk Anders	Decision (unanimous) (30–27, 29–28, 29–28)	3	5:00
Featherweight	Song Yadong	def.	Marlon Vera	Decision (unanimous) (29–28, 29–28, 29–28)	3	5:00
Preliminary Card (ESPN / ESPN+)
Welterweight	Miguel Baeza	def.	Matt Brown	TKO (punches)	2	0:18
Middleweight	Kevin Holland	def.	Anthony Hernandez	TKO (knees and punches)	1	0:39
Featherweight	Giga Chikadze	def.	Irwin Rivera	Decision (unanimous) (30–26, 30–27, 30–27)	3	5:00
Featherweight	Nate Landwehr	def.	Darren Elkins	Decision (unanimous) (29–28, 30–27, 30–27)	3	5:00
Women's Flyweight	Cortney Casey	def.	Mara Romero Borella	Submission (armbar)	1	3:36
Heavyweight	Rodrigo Nascimento	def.	Don'Tale Mayes	Submission (rear-naked choke)	2	2:05

== Bonus awards ==
The following fighters received $50,000 bonuses.

- Fight of the Night: Song Yadong vs. Marlon Vera
- Performance of the Night: Miguel Baeza and Cortney Casey

== Reported payout ==
The following is the reported payout to the fighters as reported to the Florida State Boxing Commission. It does not include sponsor money and also does not include the UFC's traditional "fight night" bonuses. The total disclosed payout for the event was $1,599,000.

- Alistair Overeem: $400,000 def. Walt Harris: $75,000
- Cláudia Gadelha: $108,000 def. Angela Hill: $54,000
- Dan Ige: $100,000 def. Edson Barboza: $79,000
- Krzysztof Jotko: $108,000 def. Eryk Anders: $61,000
- Song Yadong: $96,000 def. Marlon Vera: $65,000
- Miguel Baeza: $24,000 def. Matt Brown: $85,000
- Kevin Holland: $52,000 def. Anthony Hernandez: $12,000
- Giga Chikadze: $28,000 def. Irwin Rivera: $14,000
- Nate Landwehr: $26,000 def. Darren Elkins: $62,000
- Cortney Casey: $100,000 def. Mara Romero Borella: $20,000
- Rodrigo Nascimento: $20,000 def. Don'Tale Mayes: $10,000

== See also ==
- List of UFC events
- List of current UFC fighters
- 2020 in UFC
