= Hei Zhihong =

Hong Kong martial artist (born 1975)

Personal information
- Born: 18 September 1975 (age 50) Handan, Hebei, China
- Occupation(s): Martial artist, athlete
- Website: http://www.heizhihong.com/pageEng.php

Sport
- Sport: Wushu
- Event(s): Changquan, Jianshu, Qiangshu
- Team: Beijing Wushu Team (1999-2004); Hong Kong Wushu Team (2004-2009)
Medal record
Representing Hong Kong
Men's Wushu Taolu
Olympic Games (Unofficial)
Silver medal – second place	2008 Beijing	Taijiquan+Taijijian
World Games
Silver medal – second place	2009 Kaohsiung	Taijiquan+Taijijian
World Championships
Gold medal – first place	2007 Beijing	Qiangshu
Bronze medal – third place	2007 Beijing	Taijijian
Asian Games
Silver medal – second place	2006 Doha	Taijiquan+Taijijian
Asian Championships
Gold medal – first place	2004 Yangon	Taijiquan
Bronze medal – third place	2004 Yangon	Qiangshu
East Asian Games
Gold medal – first place	2009 Hong Kong	Duilian
Silver medal – second place	2009 Hong Kong	Taijiquan

Hei Zhihong (born 18 September 1975) is a retired competitive wushu athlete from Hong Kong.

== Competitive history ==
Hei began training wushu at the age of 7 in Handan. He later enrolled in the Beijing Sport University 1995 and joined the Beijing Wushu Team in 1999 under Wu Bin. In 2004, he joined the Hong Kong Wushu Team and won a gold medal in taijiquan and a bronze medal in qiangshu at the 2004 Asian Wushu Championships. He then won a silver medal during the 2006 Asian Games in the taijiquan competition. He then competed in the 2007 World Wushu Championships and became the world champion in qiangshu and won a bronze medal in taijijian. His victories qualified him for the 2008 Beijing Wushu Tournament where he won the silver medal in men's taijiquan. A year later, Hei won a silver medal in taijiquan and a gold medal in duilian at the 2009 East Asian Games. His last competition was the 2009 World Games where he also won a silver medal in the same combined event.

== See also ==
- List of Asian Games medalists in wushu
