= Olympic Sports Center Gymnasium (Beijing) =

Sports venue in Beijing, China

Coordinates: 39°59′5″N 116°23′36″E

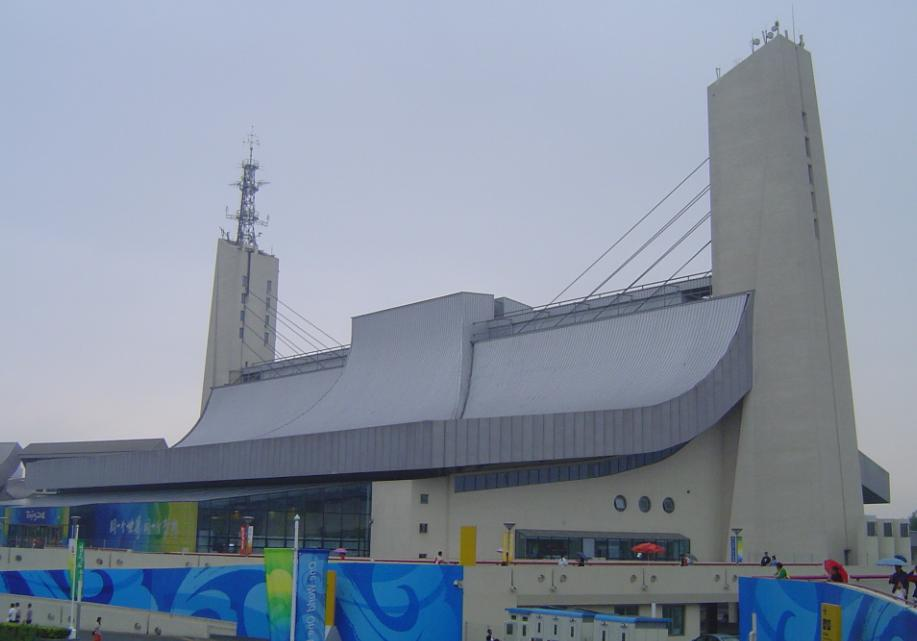
The indoor arena of the Olympic Sports Center Gymnasium.

The Olympic Sports Center Gymnasium (simplified Chinese: 奥体中心体育馆; traditional Chinese: 奧體中心體育館; pinyin: Ào Tǐ Zhōngxīn Tǐyùguǎn) is an indoor arena next to the Olympic Sports Center Stadium at the southern part of the Olympic Green in Beijing, China.

It was reformed for the 2008 Summer Olympics where it hosted the handball tournaments up to and including the quarter-finals, after which they moved to the larger Beijing National Indoor Stadium. Following the handball competitions, the 2008 Beijing Wushu Tournament took place at the venue.

It has a seating capacity of 7,000 expanded from the original 6,000 and a floor space of 47,410 square meters from the current 43,000. Three handball training courts were put to use in 2008. The renovation was complete in August 2007.
