= Jet Li filmography =

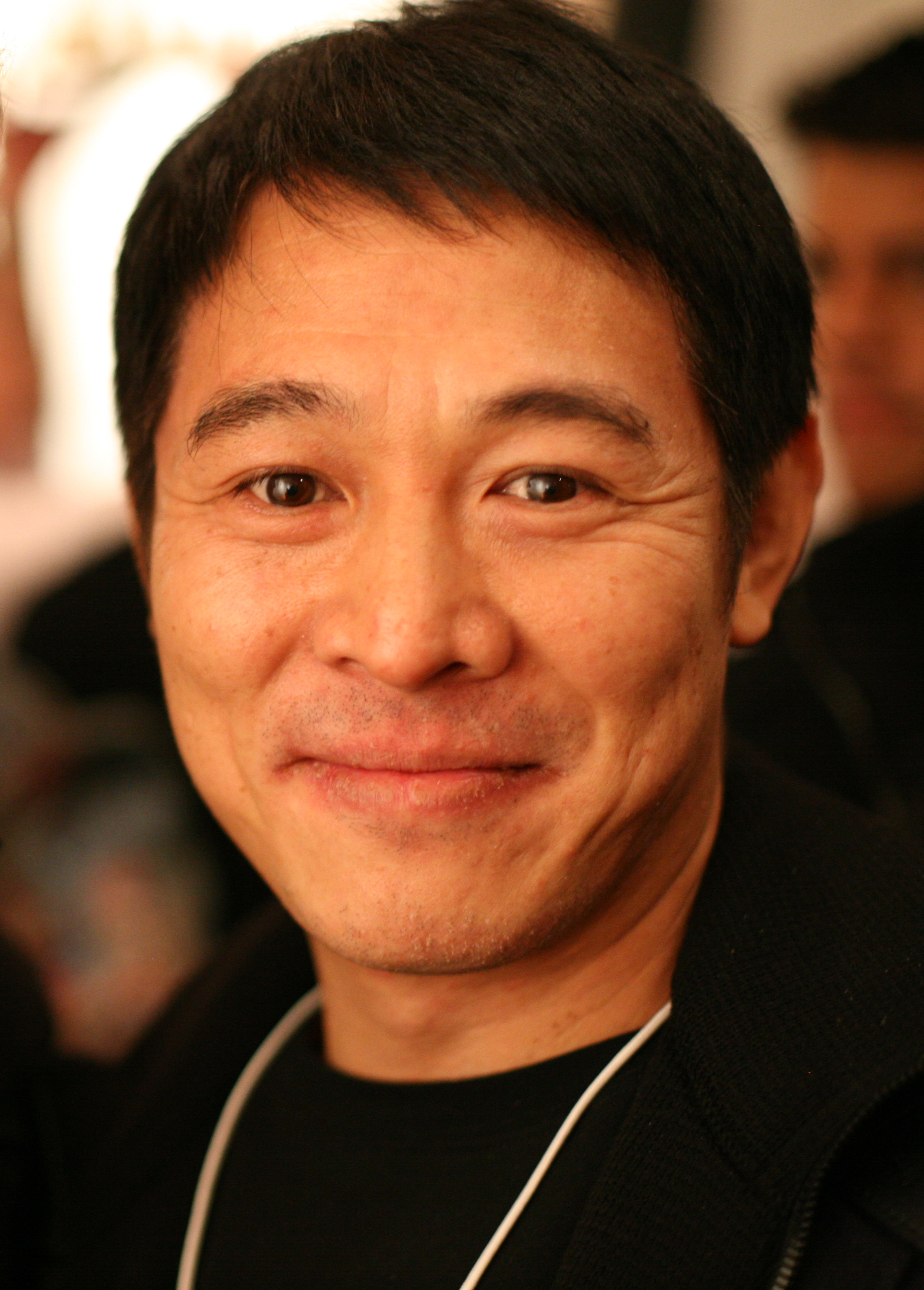
Li in 2009

Jet Li is a Chinese-born Singaporean martial artist, retired wushu champion, film actor, film producer, and philanthropist. His first non-Chinese film role was as a villain in the 1998 buddy cop action film Lethal Weapon 4 with Mel Gibson and Danny Glover. His first leading role in a Hollywood film was as Han Sing in the 2000 martial arts action film Romeo Must Die with Aaliyah. He has gone on to star in other international action films, including the Luc Besson-produced French films Kiss of the Dragon (2001) and Unleashed (2005). He co-starred in The One (2001) and War (2007) with Jason Statham, The Forbidden Kingdom (2008) with Jackie Chan, the first three of The Expendables films with Sylvester Stallone (2010–2014), and as the title character villain in The Mummy: Tomb of the Dragon Emperor (2008). In 2020, he portrayed The Emperor of China in the live-action fantasy drama Disney film Mulan.

== Film ==
Year	Title	Role	Notes/Ref.
1982	Shaolin Temple	Jueh Yuan	
1984	Kids From Shaolin	San Lung	
1986	Martial Arts of Shaolin	Zhi-ming	a.k.a. Shaolin Temple 3: Martial Arts of Shaolin
1988	Born to Defence	Jet	Directorial debut; a.k.a. Born to Defend (Australia) and Born to Defense (U.S.)
1989	Dragon Fight	Jimmy Lee	a.k.a. Defector
1991	Once Upon a Time in China	Wong Fei-hung	
1992	Swordsman II	Ling-wu Chung	A.k.a. The Legend of the Swordsman (U.S.)
1992	Once Upon a Time in China II	Wong Fei-hung	
1992	The Master	Jet	A.k.a. Dragon Fighter II; filmed in 1989, but released in 1992
1993	Once Upon a Time in China III	Wong Fei-hung	A.k.a. The Invincible Shaolin
1993	Fong Sai-yuk	Fong Sai-yuk	Also producer; a.k.a. The Legend
1993	Last Hero in China	Wong Fei-hung	Also producer; a.k.a. Claws of Steel and Deadly China Hero
1993	Fong Sai-yuk II	Fong Sai-yuk	Also producer; a.k.a. The Legend II
1993	Tai Chi Master	Zhang Sanfeng	Also producer; a.k.a. Twin Warriors (U.S.)
1993	Kung Fu Cult Master	Cheung Mo-kei	Also producer; a.k.a. The Evil Cult (U.S.), Lord of the Wu Tang and Kung Fu Master
1994	The New Legend of Shaolin	Hung Hei-kwun	Also producer; a.k.a. Legend of the Red Dragon
1994	The Bodyguard from Beijing	Allan Hui Ching-yeung/John Chang	Also producer; a.k.a. The Defender and Zhong Nan Hai bao biao
1994	Fist of Legend	Chen Zhen	Also producer
1995	My Father Is a Hero	Kung Wei	A.k.a. The Enforcer and Letter to Daddy
1995	High Risk	Kit Li	A.k.a. Meltdown
1996	Dr. Wai in "The Scripture with No Words"	Chow Si-Kit	A.k.a. Adventure King and The Scripture With No Words
1996	Black Mask	Michael/Simon/Tsui Chik/Black Mask	Released in 1999 in the U.S.
1997	Once Upon a Time in China and America	Wong Fei-hung	A.k.a. Once Upon a Time in China IV
1998	Hitman	Fu	A.k.a. The Hitman and The Contract Killer
1998	Lethal Weapon 4	Wah Sing-ku	
2000	Romeo Must Die	Han Sing	
2001	Kiss of the Dragon	Inspector Liu 'Johnny' Jian	Also associate producer
2001	The One	Gabe Law/Gabriel Yulaw/Lawless	
2002	Hero	Nameless	Released in 2004 in the U.S.
2003	Cradle 2 the Grave	Duncan Su	
2005	Unleashed	Danny	Also producer; a.k.a. Danny the Dog
2006	Fearless	Huo Yuanjia	Also producer and presenter; a.k.a. Legend of a Fighter (Hong Kong)
2007	War	Rogue/Victor Shaw/Tom Lone	A.k.a. Rogue Assassin and Rogue
2007	The Warlords	Pang Qingyun	
2008	The Forbidden Kingdom	Sun Wukong / Silent Monk	
2008	The Mummy: Tomb of the Dragon Emperor	Emperor Han	
2009	The Founding of a Republic	Chen Shaokuan	A.k.a. Jian Guo Da Ye, Founding of the Nation and Lofty Ambitions of Nation Building
2010	Ocean Heaven	Sam Wong	
2010	The Expendables	Yin Yang	
2011	The Sorcerer and the White Snake	Reverend Fahai	
2011	Flying Swords of Dragon Gate	Chow Wai-on	
2012	The Expendables 2	Yin Yang	
2013	Badges of Fury	Huang Feihong	
2014	The Expendables 3	Yin Yang	
2016	League of Gods	Jiang Ziya	
2017	Gong Shou Dao	Old Servant	Also producer
2020	Mulan	The Emperor of China	
2026	Blades of the Guardians	Chang	

== Documentaries ==
Year	Title	Notes
1983	This is Kung Fu 中華武術	Biographic role
1988	Dragons of the Orient 東方巨龍	Biographic role
1988	Abbot Hai Teng	Biographic role
1992	Lucky Way 大八掛	
1994	Shaolin Kung Fu 少林真功夫	
1999	Li-Thal Weapon	

== Music video appearances ==
Year	Title	Artist(s)
2000	"Try Again"	Aaliyah featuring Timbaland

== Video games ==
Year	Title	Voice role	Notes
2004	Jet Li: Rise to Honor	Kit Yun (voice and motion capture actor)	Released in 2004 in the United States
