= Don't Give a Damn (film) =

1995 Hong Kong film by Sammo Hung

- VCD cover

Chinese name
- Traditional Chinese: 冇面俾
- Simplified Chinese: 冇面俾
Transcriptions
Standard Mandarin
- Hanyu Pinyin: Mǎo Miàn Bǐ
Yue: Cantonese
- Jyutping: Mou2 Min5 Bei2
- Directed by: Sammo Hung
- Screenplay by: Sze-to Cheuk-hon; Philip Kwok; Chung Wai-hung
- Produced by: Sammo Hung
- Starring: Sammo Hung; Yuen Biao; Takeshi Kaneshiro; Kathy Chow
- Cinematography: Lau Hung-chuen
- Edited by: Chun Yu
- Music by: Frankie Chan
- Production companies: Bojon Films; Long Shong Pictures (HK)
- Distributed by: Mandarin Films
- Release date: 17 February 1995
- Running time: 95 minutes
- Country: Hong Kong
- Language: Cantonese
- Box office: HK$5,085,770

Don't Give a Damn (Chinese: 冇面俾), also known as Burger Cop in the United States, is a 1995 Hong Kong action comedy film produced and directed by Sammo Hung and starring Hung, Yuen Biao, Takeshi Kaneshiro and Kathy Chow.

== Plot ==
Police inspector Pierre Lau (Sammo Hung) and his young superior Tang Chuen-shek (Takeshi Kaneshiro) are ordered to cooperate with customs officer Rambo Wong (Yuen Biao) to foil a drug trade. During the operation, they arrest Nakamura, a major drug lord and seize the largest bulk of drugs since the start of Hong Kong. Japanese businessman Yamamoto (Kelvin Siu) is the mastermind of the Nakmura Organization. Due to the large amount of drugs being confiscated and with nothing left, Yamamoto desperately decides to order his underling Siu-lung (Collin Chou) to hire some thugs from America to help him snatch the drugs at the police station to destroy the evidence so Yamamoto would not face any charges and restore the collapse Nakamura Organization.

On the other hand, Yau Ching (Kathy Chow) and Pierre are like-minded colleagues, while May (Annabelle Lau), who has a secret crush on Pieree, is not his cup of tea. At the same time, Rambo has admired Pierre's subordinate, Anna (Eileen Tung), after their first meet and often forces Pierre to be their matchmaker.

In order to snatch the drugs from the police station, the thugs plant bombs in the station, forcing the officers to leave the building while they pose as SDU members and go snatch the drugs from the evidence room. However, they were penetrated by Shek and after battling alongside Pierre against the thugs, the thugs managed to escape after one of the thugs Sean (Shawn Patrick Berry) was arrested.

After this, Yamamoto orders the thugs to leave Hong Kong, who refuse to do so since Bobby (Robert Samuels), Sean's older brother, refuses to leave without his brother. When Yamamoto's bodyguards attempt to kill them, the thugs managed to overpower them and kill them. The thugs then kidnap Ching and forces Pierre to free Ching, where he will get Ching and the drugs back in exchange for Sean. Pierre decides to take matters to his own hands and Rambo and Shek agrees to help him, while Yamamoto also decides to take back the drugs and kill the thugs.

Pierre confronts the thugs with holding Rambo, who is dressed and painted to resemble Sean, hostage to exchange for Ching and the drugs while Shek, also dressed and painted to resemble Sean, takes another route to rescue Ching. But hell breaks loose no so long later and Yamamoto also arrives with Siu-lung and two white bodyguards. After several long battles, where Pierre defeats Bobby, who was later killed by Lung, Pierre kills Lung and Yamamoto, while Rambo kills the two bodyguards with help of two thugs Timmy (Timmy Hung) and Cheung (Jimmy Hung), who decide to turn straight and be witnesses, and Shek engages in a gunfight with the thugs and bodyguards. In the end, Pierre is reunited with Ching.

== Cast ==
- Sammo Hung as Pierre Lau
- Yuen Biao as Rambo Wong Yuk Man
- Takeshi Kaneshiro as Inspector Tang Chuen-shek
- Kathy Chow as Yau Ching
- Eileen Tung as Anna
- Annabelle Lau as May
- Timmy Hung as Timmy
- Collin Chou as Siu-lung
- Jimmy Hung as Cheung
- Kelvin Wong as Yamamoto
- Dion Lam as Yamamoto's bodyguard
- Eddie Maher as Yamamoto's bodyguard
- Habby Heske as Yamamoto's bodyguard
- Roy Filler as Yamamoto's bodyguard
- Wong Chan as Commissioner Wong
- Robert Samuels as Bobby
- Shawn Patrick Berry as Sean
- Charlie Wong as Charlie
- Jackie Lee as Jackie
- Yvonne Yung as Sun Flower (cameo)
- Natalis Chan as Deranged cop (cameo)
- Lau Kar-wing as Statement cop (cameo)
- Bryan Leung as No-nonsense cop (cameo)
- Melvin Wong as Rambo's superior officer (cameo)
- Michael Miu as CID (cameo)
- Tommy Wong as CID (cameo)
- Wan Chi Keung as CID on the bus (cameo)
- Wan Yeung-ming as CID on the bus (cameo)
- Blackie Ko as Stupid robber on the bus (cameo)
- Richard Ng as Old man on the bus (cameo)
- Cheung Kwok-keung as Superman (cameo)
- Chin Siu-ho as Spider Man (cameo)
- Teddy Yip as Senior Officer Yip (cameo)
- Wu Ma as Arrested hawker (cameo)
- Peter Chan as Rapist at scrapyard (cameo)
- Billy Lau as Fainted cop (cameo)
- Wong Hoi-yiu
- Simon Cheung

== Production ==
Don't Give a Damn was originally set to be a reunion of the Three Brothers Jackie Chan, Sammo Hung and Yuen Biao, members of the Seven Little Fortunes who attended the China Drama Academy together, who had last appeared together in 1988's Dragons Forever. However, due to obligations on Rumble in the Bronx, Chan was forced to pull out and was replaced by Takeshi Kaneshiro.

== Box office ==
The film grossed HK$5,085,770 at the Hong Kong box office during its theatrical release from 17 February to 2 March 1995 in Hong Kong.
