= The Top Bet =

1991 Hong Kong film by Jeffrey Lau and Corey Yuen

- Film poster

Chinese name
- Traditional Chinese: 賭霸
- Simplified Chinese: 赌霸
Transcriptions
Standard Mandarin
- Hanyu Pinyin: Dǔ Bà
Yue: Cantonese
- Jyutping: Dou2 Baa3
- Directed by: Jeffrey Lau; Corey Yuen
- Written by: Jeffrey Lau; Ng See-yuen; Corey Yuen
- Produced by: Jeffrey Lau; Corey Yuen
- Starring: Carol Cheng; Anita Mui; Ng Man-tat
- Cinematography: Jimmy Leung
- Edited by: Hai Kit-wai
- Music by: Lowell Lo
- Production companies: Bo Ho Films; Paragon Films
- Distributed by: Golden Harvest
- Release date: 7 March 1991
- Running time: 111 minutes
- Country: Hong Kong
- Language: Cantonese
- Box office: HK$15,575,932

The Top Bet (Chinese: 賭霸 Literal translation: Queen of Gambling) is a 1991 Hong Kong comedy film directed by Jeffrey Lau and Corey Yuen and starring Carol Cheng, Anita Mui and Ng Man-tat. It is a sequel to Lau and Yuen's 1990 film All for the Winner.

== Synopsis ==
After Sing (Stephen Chow) uses his special powers to beat Hung Kwong (Paul Chun) in the Gambling King Competition, his elder sister Mei (Anita Mui) is ordered by the Special Power Clan in Mainland China to bring him back as he is not supposed to use his special powers for gambling. Meanwhile, Sing is on a world tour and Mei cannot find him in their Uncle's (Ng Man-tat) home. In the meantime, Sing's ex-Taiwanese boss Chan Chung (Jeffrey Lau) is looking for him to represent Taiwan again in another upcoming world gambling competition. Since he cannot be found, his Uncle is at his wit's end to find someone with similar powers to replace him. Whence, comes a rescuer in the form of a local female gambler by the name of Fanny (Carol Cheng), a.k.a. Queen of Gambling, at a fish market. But in reality, she is no more than a con artist fooling her fellow fishmongers. Fanny decides to pretend to have special powers because she needs a large sum of money to cure her younger brother's illness.

== Cast ==
- Anita Mui as Mei, Sing's elder sister
- Carol Dodo Cheng as Fanny/Queen of Gambling
- Ng Man-tat as Blackie Tat/Sam Suk (3rd uncle)
- Sandra Ng as Ping
- Lowell Lo as Tai
- Paul Chun as Hung Kwong
- Jeffrey Lau as Chan Chung
- Corey Yuen as Fishy Shing
- Kenny Bee as Bee
- Bowie Wu as referee at gambling competition
- Shing Fui-On as Brother Shaw/male voice of Aunty Luk
- Dion Lam Dik-On as Kwong's hired killer
- Yuen Wah as Sifu Wu Lung Lo (cameo)
- Stephen Chow as Sing (cameo)
- Sharla Cheung Man (cameo; archive footage)
- Angelina Lo as Aunty Luk
- Lau Shun as Yim Chun
- Elaine Law Suet-Ling as fat lady reporter
- Sze Mei-Yee as Competition commentator
- Lo Hung as Fanny's 1st competitor
- Hoh Dung as Brother Shaw's man
- Jameson Lam Wa-Fan as Chung's bodyguard
- So Wai-Nam as Chung's bodyguard
- Dickens Chan Wing-Chung as Tony
- Wong Ying-Kit as doctor
- Fruit Chan Goh as spectator
- Rico Chu Tak-On as manager of Dominic Saloon
- Hui Sze-Man as customer of Dominic Saloon
- Chan Ging as robber at Dominic Saloon
- Lee Ying-Git as robber
- Alexander Chan Mong-Wah as gambler
- Benny Tse Chi-Wah as ice-cream seller
