= Biao =

Biao may refer to:

== Culture ==
- Biao language

== People ==
- Lin Biao (1907–1971), Chinese communist military leader
- Liu Biao (142–208), Chinese warlord and the governor of Jing Province during the late Han dynasty
- Yuen Biao (born 1957), Hong Kong–based actor
- Ban Biao (3–54), Chinese historian
- Fu Biao (1963–2005), Chinese actor
- Ma Biao (politician), Communist Party politician
- Ma Biao (general), Chinese Muslim major-general

== Places ==
- Mount Biao, volcanic peak in Equatorial Guinea

== See also ==
- Piao (disambiguation)
