= Fong Sai-yuk (disambiguation) =

Fong Sai-yuk is a Chinese martial artist and folk hero.

Fong Sai-yuk may also refer to:

- Fong Sai-yuk (film), a 1993 Hong Kong martial arts film
- Fong Sai-yuk II, a 1993 Hong Kong martial arts film
- Fong Sai-yuk (TV series), a 1999 ATV martial arts comedy TV series
