= Hero (1997 film) =

1997 Hong Kong film by Corey Yuen

- Hero DVD cover
- Traditional Chinese: 馬永貞
- Simplified Chinese: 马永贞
- Jyutping: Ma2 Wing2 Zing1
- Directed by: Corey Yuen
- Written by: Corey Yuen; Jeffrey Lau
- Based on: Boxer from Shantung by: Chang Cheh; Ni Kuang
- Produced by: Mona Fong
- Starring: Takeshi Kaneshiro; Yuen Biao; Jessica Hsuan; Valerie Chow; Yuen Wah; Yuen Tak; Corey Yuen
- Cinematography: Tom Lau
- Edited by: Hai Kit-wai
- Music by: Lincoln Lo; Raymond Wong; William Hu
- Production companies: Shaw Brothers Studio; Celestial Pictures
- Distributed by: Shaw Brothers Studio
- Release date: 7 June 1997
- Running time: 97 minutes
- Country: Hong Kong
- Language: Cantonese
- Box office: HK$3,015,240

Hero (Chinese: 馬永貞; Jyutping: Ma^{2} Wing^{2} Zing^{1}) is a 1997 Hong Kong martial arts film written and directed by Corey Yuen. The film stars Taiwanese-Japanese actor Takeshi Kaneshiro, established Hong Kong action stars from the China Drama Academy (Yuen Biao, Yuen Wah, Corey Yuen, Yuen Tak) and Hong Kong actresses Valerie Chow and Jessica Hsuan. Hero is a remake of the 1972 film Boxer from Shantung. The film was produced by then TVB chairwoman Mona Fong.

== Plot ==
At the end of the Qing Dynasty due to poverty and starvation, Ma Wing-jing (Takeshi Kaneshiro) and his older brother Ma Tai-cheung (Yuen Wah) flee from their harsh homeland to the big city of Shanghai to make their fortune. Once they arrive in Shanghai reality sets in and both are only able to secure jobs as coolies (bitter hard manual labor) making chump change. Wing-jing admires the local triad gangster boss Tam Sei's (Yuen Biao) life style. Tam, seeing Ma Wing-jing admire his horse carriage, challenges Wing-jing to a human versus horse race. Wing-jing accepts his challenge, after seeing Wing-jing's determination, loyalty, fighting skills and athleticism, the two strike up a friendship and Tam tells Wing-jing to visit his night club one day if he ever needs help.

The two most powerful mob bosses in Shanghai are Tam Sei, who has the British government backing him, and Yang Shuang (Yuen Tak), who has the entire Shanghai police force working for him. Both are at odds to gain full control of Shanghai's crime organization. Ma Wing-jing gains more trust from Tam Sei when he hears about and intervene's in Yang Shaung's assassination attempt on Tam Sei, saving Tam's life. As a reward, Tam gives Wing-jing a small territory in Shanghai to control. Wing-jing uses it to his advantage to gain more territory in Shanghai. All is well and prosperous until he tries to conquer the territory belonging to Yang Shuang. Blinded by his power and greed, he is betrayed by the one he had trusted the most, leading to tragedy for himself and Tam, who, despite Wing-jing's foolishness, still remains his friend.

== Cast ==
- Takeshi Kaneshiro as Ma Wing-jing
- Yuen Biao as Tam Sei
- Jessica Hsuan as Kam Ling-tze
- Valerie Chow as Yam Yeung-tien
- Yuen Wah as Ma Tai-cheung
- Yuen Tak as Yang Shuang
- Corey Yuen Kwai as Uncle Po

== Production crew ==
- Production Manager: Jackson Ha
- Sound Recording: True Technic Limited
- Art Director: Lau Man-hung
- Lighting: Chan Wai-lin
- Planning: Chang Oi-bing, Wan Pak-nam, Lawrence Wong
- Makeup: Lee Wai-fong
- Hair Stylist: Sharon Li
- Costume Designer: Dora Ng
- Props: Lai Yu, Hung Hin-fat
- Assistant Director: Bill Chan, Chan Sek
- Action Director: Yuen Tak, Corey Yuen
- Assistant Action Director: Jonathan Ting, Jacky Tang
