= Piao =

Piao may refer to:

== People ==
- Piáo (朴), Mandarin pronunciation and pinyin transcription of ethnic Korean surname Park (Korean surname)
  - Piao Wenyao (born 1988), Chinese professional Go player
  - Piao Cheng (born 1989), Korean-Chinese football player

== Places ==
- Chalan Piao, village on the southwestern area of Saipan
- Gurdwara Nank Piao

== Other ==
- Piao (album) (飘 floating), by Zhao Wei

== See also ==
- Biao (disambiguation)
- Pyu (disambiguation)
