= Eastern Production =

Hong Kong film studio

Eastern Production Ltd.
- Company type: Private limited company
- Industry: Film
- Founded: 1991; 35 years ago in Hong Kong
- Founder: Jet Li
- Defunct: 1996; 30 years ago
- Fate: Defunct
- Headquarters: Hong Kong
- Products: Motion pictures
- Owner: Jet Li

Eastern Production Ltd. was a Hong Kong-based independent company, which specialized in production of films, established in 1991 by martial artist and actor Jet Li, who was also owner of the company.

== Films ==
Year	Film	Director(s)	Box office
1993	Fong Sai-yuk	Corey Yuen	HK$30,666,842
1993	Last Hero in China	Wong Jing	HK$18,178,129
1993	Fong Sai-yuk II	Corey Yuen	HK$23,013,797.00
1993	Tai Chi Master	Yuen Woo-ping	HK$12.56 million (US$1.63 million)
1994	The Bodyguard from Beijing	Corey Yuen	N/A
1994	Fist of Legend	Gordon Chan	HK$30.7 million
1996	Dr. Wai in "The Scripture with No Words"	Ching Siu-tung	HK$13,847,368
