= Wei Chunhua =

Wei Chunhua may refer to the following:

- Wei Chunhua (衛春華), a fictional character in The Book and the Sword
- Wei Chunhua (韋春花), a fictional character in The Deer and the Cauldron
