= Women's Prison =

Women's Prison may refer to:

- Incarceration of women
- Women's Prison, Christianshavn, Copenhagen, Denmark (1742–1921)
- Women's Prison (1951 film), Mexican drama
- Women's Prison (1955 film), American drama with Ida Lupino and Cleo Moore
- Women's Prison (1958 film), French drama (original title Prisons de femmes)
- Women's Prison (1988 film), Hong Kong drama
- Women's Prison (2002 film), an Iranian drama directed by Manijeh Hekmat
- "Women's Prison", song from Loretta Lynn's Van Lear Rose 2004 album

== See also ==
- Prison for Women (Kingston, Ontario), Canadian correctional facility (1934–2000)
- Julia Tutwiler Prison for Women, Alabama
- New Hampshire State Prison for Women
