= 冒險王 =

冒險王 or 冒険王 (lit. 'Adventure King') may refer to:

- Bōken Ō, a monthly magazine published by Akita Shoten
- Dr. Wai in "The Scripture with No Words", 1996 Hong Kong film
- King of Adventure, 2002 Taiwanese television show that hosted by Taiwanese entertainer Ming Dao in first

== See also ==
- The dictionary definition of 冒 at Wiktionary
- The dictionary definition of 險 at Wiktionary
- The dictionary definition of 険 at Wiktionary
- The dictionary definition of 王 at Wiktionary
