= The Invincible Armour =

1977 Hong Kong-Taiwanese film by Ng See-yuen

- Film poster
- Directed by: Ng See-yuen
- Written by: Lu Tung
- Produced by: Hsia Fan
- Starring: Hwang Jang-lee; John Liu; Lee Hoi-sang; Tino Wong; Phillip Ko
- Cinematography: Raymond Chang
- Edited by: Poon Hung
- Music by: Stanley Chow
- Production company: Lai Wah Film Company
- Release date: 29 June 1977
- Running time: 90 minutes
- Countries: Hong Kong; Taiwan
- Language: Mandarin

The Invincible Armor is a 1977 kung fu film directed by Ng See-yuen. Co-produced by Hong Kong and Taiwan, it stars Hwang Jang-lee, John Liu, and Tino Wong.

== Plot ==
The film opens with a demonstration of the Iron Armor and Eagle Claw kung fu techniques. The narration explains that the former makes the user almost invulnerable, while the latter is the deadliest of all techniques.

On patrol through town, Ming General Chow (Liu) observes a fighter, Hu Lung, fending off bandits. Impressed, General Chow arranges for Hu Lung to meet Minister Liu, who is in charge of Royal Security, as a potential candidate for joining the Ming forces. While sparring with Liu in the courtyard as a test of his skills, Hu Lung suddenly produces a knife and assassinates the Minister before escaping over the courtyard wall. As General Chow rushes to Liu's aid, the guards arrive and immediately arrest Chow for the murder. En route to the court, a group of soldiers arrives with orders to kill Chow. Highly skilled in kung fu himself, Chow defeats his captors and escapes.

Ming Minister of State Cheng (Lee), an authoritarian leader and master of the Eagle Claw and Iron Armor techniques, summons his most skilled enforcer, Shen Yu (Wong), to hunt down Chow and arrest him. Chow hunts for Hu Lung, but must avoid the authorities along the way who are attempting to kill him. He eventually tracks down Hu Lung, but is thwarted by Shen Yu as Hu runs away. Chow tells Shen Yu that he has been wrongly accused and that Hu Lung is the actual murderer, but Shen is not convinced and he fights with Chow. The fight is interrupted by an old man claiming to be after General Chow as well, who then fights with Shen Yu over who will get to bring him in. Chow uses this opportunity to escape and continues his pursuit of Hu Lung.

The old man is later revealed to be Hu Lung's old teacher, who previously expelled Hu from their clan. Hu confesses to his old teacher that he was paid by Minister Cheng, a former classmate of the old man, to carry out the assassination. The old man confronts the Minister over his actions and sets a trap to kill him by using Hu (the only witness to Cheng's involvement) as bait. The trap fails, however, and the old man is killed by Cheng in their ensuing fight, while Hu again escapes.

Meanwhile, Chow learns the Iron Finger technique from the old man's grandson and granddaughter; a technique able to defeat Cheng's Iron Armor. But his training is cut short when Shen Yu and a second enforcer sent by the Minister arrive to arrest him again. After the enforcer attempts to kill Chow over Shen's objections, Shen begins to doubt Chow's guilt and gives him three days to locate Hu Lung and clear his name. Before he can catch up with Hu Lung, Hu is killed by Cheng, but Shen discovers evidence on Hu's body that the minister is involved. That night, when staying at an inn nearby, multiple assassins attack Shen Yu, but he is saved by an unknown individual who also delivers him a strange letter. The next morning, he confronts Cheng, and is forced to defeat several of his henchman.

With Minister Cheng's plot exposed, he offers Shen Yu to join him, which Shen Yu outright refuses. With no other choice left, he attacks Shen Yu, who is soon assisted by Chow and the old man's two grandchildren. During the fight, Chow discovers that Cheng's weak spot is his testicles and that Cheng is able to retract them into his body for protection. Through the group's combined efforts, Chow is able to use his Iron Finger technique to cause Cheng to drop his testicles so Chow can crush them, killing Cheng.

== Cast ==
- Hwang Jang-lee – Minister Cheng
- John Liu – Chow Lung Fu
- Lee Hoi-sang – Hu Lung
- Tino Wong – Shen Yu
- Phillip Ko – Hu's teacher
- Yuen Biao
- Corey Yuen

== Score ==
The main theme for Tonino Valerii's Spaghetti Western film Day of Anger, scored by Riz Ortolani, is used multiple times throughout the film.

== Reception ==
Review aggregator site Rotten Tomatoes gives the film a score of 79% based on 250+ user reviews.
