= Dion Lam =

Hong Kong action choreographer and actor (born 1961)

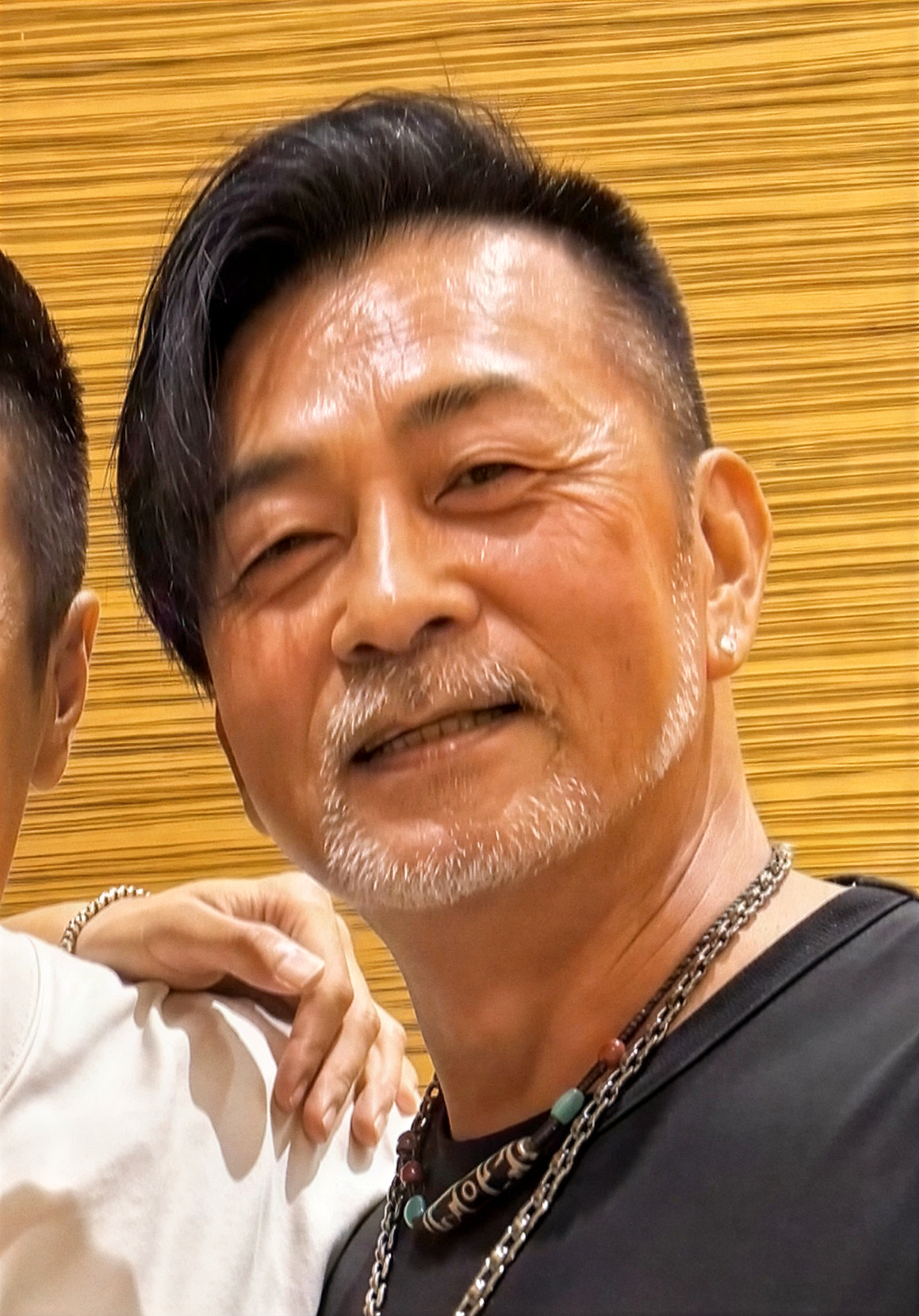
- Lam in September 2025
- Born: 27 September 1961 (age 64); Hong Kong
- Occupations: Action choreographer; actor
- Years active: 1980–present

Dion Lam (Chinese: 林迪安; Lam Dik-on; born 27 September 1961) is a Hong Kong action choreographer and actor.

== Filmography ==
- 1980 The Hangman
- 1982 Energetic 21
- 1983 Crazy Blood
- 1988 Mistaken Identity
- 1989 The Killer
- 1989 Ghost Ballroom
- 1989 Angel Enforcers
- 1989 Blood Ritual
- 1990 Return to Action
- 1990 The Sniping
- 1990 She Shoots Straight
- 1990 Shanghai Shanghai
- 1990 The Revenge of Angel
- 1991 The Top Bet
- 1991 To Be Number One
- 1991 Inspector Pink Dragon
- 1991 Fist of Fury 1991
- 1992 American Samurai
- 1992 Hero of the Beggars
- 1993 Flying Dagger
- 1993 Swordsman III: The East Is Red
- 1993 Last Hero in China
- 1993 Executioners
- 1993 Ghost Lantern
- 1993 Her Fatal Ways 3
- 1993 Freedom Run Q
- 1994 The Private Eye Blues
- 1994 Return to a Better Tomorrow
- 1994 Her Fatal Ways 4
- 1994 Wonder Seven
- 1994 Love on Delivery
- 1995 No Justice for All
- 1995 The Vengeance
- 1995 Don't Give a Damn
- 1998 The Storm Riders
- 1999 A Man Called Hero
- 1999 The Matrix
- 2001 Exit Wounds
- 2002 Awara Paagal Deewana
- 2002 Infernal Affairs
- 2003 The Matrix Reloaded
- 2003 The Matrix Revolutions
- 2004 Spider-Man 2
- 2006 Daisy
- 2008 My Mighty Princess
- 2011 Overheard 2
- 2014 Kung Fu Jungle
- 2016 Kammatipadam
- 2017 Shock Wave
- TBA Highlander

== Awards ==
- Hong Kong Film Awards (1999) – Best Action Choreography (nominated for The Storm Riders)
- Hong Kong Film Awards (2000) – Best Action Choreography (nominated for A Man Called Hero)
- Hong Kong Film Awards (2003) – Best Action Choreography (nominated for Infernal Affairs)
- Golden Horse Awards (2003) – Best Action Choreography (nominated for Infernal Affairs)
