= The Iceman Cometh (1989 film) =

1989 Hong Kong film by Clarence Fok

- DVD cover
- Directed by: Clarence Fok; Yuen Biao (action)
- Written by: Johnny Mak; Stephen Shiu
- Produced by: Raymond Chow; Johnny Mak; Stephen Shiu
- Starring: Yuen Biao; Maggie Cheung; Yuen Wah; Tai Po; Elvis Tsui; Corey Yuen; Stanley Fung
- Cinematography: Hang Sang Poon
- Edited by: Hung Poon
- Music by: Joseph Chan Wing-Leung
- Production companies: Fortune Star; Golden Harvest; Johnny Mak Production Ltd.
- Distributed by: 88 Films Presents 88 Asia Collection; United Kingdom; Hong Kong Legends; United Kingdom; Tai Seng Video Marketing; United States
- Release date: 18 August 1989
- Running time: 115 minutes
- Country: Hong Kong
- Language: Cantonese

The Iceman Cometh (simplified Chinese: 急冻奇侠; traditional Chinese: 急凍奇俠) (also known as The Time Warriors), is a 1989 Hong Kong martial arts fantasy film directed by Clarence Fok. The film stars Yuen Biao, Maggie Cheung and Yuen Wah. The film was released theatrically in Hong Kong on 18 August 1989.

Yuen Biao and Yuen Wah (alongside their opera school brother Yuen Tak) also served as action choreographers on the film. Similar to Highlander the film combines elements of sci-fi and historical fantasy with a contemporary setting and action. The film was nominated for three Hong Kong Film Awards in 1990. The film is not related to the Eugene O'Neill play.

A remake, titled simply Iceman, was released in April 2014 and a sequel to that remake, Iceman: The Time Traveller on November 2, 2018.

== Plot ==
In 16th Century China, Ming guard Fong Sau-ching (Yuen Biao) relentlessly tracks the ruthless villain Feng San (Yuen Wah), who is notorious for raping and killing women. Feng San murders the princess and the emperor is furious that Fong Sau-ching wasn't able to save her. He gives Fong one last chance to capture Feng San within 20 days. After Feng San steals the priceless and magical Black Jade Buddha, a magical artifact that grants user the ability to time travel; Fong and Feng San are transported to 300 years in the future. Upon arrival, a titanic martial arts encounter atop a cliff ensues and is only ended when the two men tumble into a glacier where they are instantly frozen. Later being thawed out and awaken by scientists, Fong Sau-ching must continue his pursuit of his quarry although to survive in 1980s Kowloon with the confounding discovery of electricity, TV and toilets, he's going to need a little help from femme fatale Polly (Maggie Cheung). Polly hires Fong to be her servant and bodyguard since she knows of his martial arts expertise and in return she will help him get an ID card. Fong feels extremely shameful for not being able to capture Feng San and once a royal guard like himself is now a servant to a woman.

Meanwhile, Feng San is still out and about and he's now a thief working for the local crime boss. He kills his boss after he was caught trying to rape his boss' girlfriend and a fight started. He then kills her in a brutal fashion of breaking her limbs. Later, Fong finds out that this whole time Polly was a prostitute and she's been using him the whole time, so he vows to not be her slave any longer. Around the same time, Fong reads a newspaper about a woman who's been murdered and her limbs are broken. He is instantly reminded of how Feng San kills his victims and now knows he's still alive. Feng San kidnaps Polly by pretending to be one of her clients. Fong goes to rescue her and is forced to admit that he loves Polly when Feng San has held her hostage. A big fight between Fong and Feng San ensues with Feng San being the victor and Fong severely injured but is able to recover after making it to the hospital.

Feng San learns that the Buddha's wheel, the magical device that sent him to the future has been dug up and transported to a Hong Kong exhibit. He steals a load of firearms from the local arms dealer and plans to take the modern firearms back to the 16th century and conquer the dynasty. Fong is also aware of the Buddha's Wheel and predicts that Feng San will be there. He then trains for the upcoming battle and crafts a sword to combat Feng San. After finishing the sword he leaves Polly without her noticing because he doesn't want her to get involved. At the exhibit, Feng San finds a note on the wheel written by Fong that tells him to come up to the roof for the Black Jade, which he needs to activate the time travel device. On the roof top, Fong confronts Feng San and tells him that no matter what happens he will fulfill his duty to the emperor and take Feng San back to pay for his crimes. Fong eventually kills Feng San by impaling him on shards of broken glass. He takes Feng San's body and activates the Buddha's wheel. Polly arrives at the scene but was too late. She watches tearfully as Fong leaves. Some time later, Polly quits being a prostitute and is now working at a corner store. As she went to take out the trash, she runs into a man who resembles Fong (possibly a reincarnation). She shouts with joy that Fong is still alive and leaps onto him even though the man has no idea who she is.

== Cast ==
- Yuen Biao as Fong Sau-ching / Fang Shou-zheng
- Maggie Cheung as Polly
- Yuen Wah as Feng San
- Tai Po as Pimp (Chang's thug)
- Elvis Tsui as Chinese Scientist
- Corey Yuen as Bum
- Stanley Fung as Santa Claus
- Jing Chen as Arms Dealer
- Liu Wai-hung as Angel
- Wong Jing as Crane Operator
- Alvina Kong as Hooker
- Sarah Lee as Hooker
- Sin Lap-man as Robber
- Yuen Tak as Person (extra)
- John Cheung as Doctor
- Cho Tat-wah as Zheng's uncle instructor
- Lau Chau-sang as Chang's thug
- Lai Yin-san
- Wong Yiu-ming as the emperor of the Ming Dynasty (cameo)

== Production ==
The film's opening fight scene was filmed on location in Korea. This part of the shoot was troubled by snowstorms. This was extreme weather some members of the crew suffered from frostbite while filming. The climactic fight scene took a month to shoot.

== Reception ==
The film was a modest hit grossing HK$14 million at the Hong Kong box office. The film appears in Jonathan Rosenbaum's 1,000 favourite films list. He praises Maggie Cheung's comedic performance in particular.

== Awards ==
The film was nominated for the following awards at the Hong Kong Film Awards:

- Best Action Choreography
- Best Cinematography
- Best Film Editing

== Home media ==
DVD was released in All Regions in the United States on 27 April 1999, it was distributed by Tai Seng Video Marketing. On 25 July 2005, DVD was released by Hong Kong Legends in the United Kingdom in Region 2. On 19 December 2022, Blu-ray was released by 88 Films Presents 88 Asia Collection in the United Kingdom in Region B includes booklet 6 lobby cards and film poster by Sean Longmore. The two-disc set includes two versions with a 115-minute "Hong Kong Cut" and a 127-minute "Taiwan Cut".
