= Fong Sai-yuk (film) =

1993 Hong Kong film by Corey Yuen

- Film poster
- 方世玉
- Directed by: Corey Yuen
- Written by: Chan Kin-chung; Kevin Tsai; Jeffrey Lau
- Produced by: Jet Li
- Starring: Jet Li; Josephine Siao; Vincent Zhao; Michelle Reis
- Cinematography: Jingle Ma
- Edited by: Cheung Yiu-chung
- Music by: Romeo Diaz; Mark Lui; James Wong
- Production company: Eastern Production
- Distributed by: Gala Film Distribution; Dimension Films
- Release date: 4 March 1993
- Running time: 106 minutes
- Country: Hong Kong
- Language: Cantonese
- Box office: HK$30,666,842

Fong Sai-yuk (方世玉), also known as The Legend of Fong Sai-yuk, The Legend, and The Prodigal Fighter, is a 1993 Hong Kong action-comedy film directed by Corey Yuen and produced by Jet Li, who starred as Chinese folk hero Fong Sai-yuk (Fang Shiyu). It co-starred Josephine Siao, Vincent Zhao, and Michelle Reis. The film received positive reviews, particularly praising Siao's acting and the action choreography. The film won the Hong Kong Film Award and Golden Horse Award for best action choreography. A sequel, Fong Sai-yuk II, was released later the same year in 1993.

The film, which is loosely connected to the wuxia novel The Book and the Sword by Jin Yong, follows Fang Shiyu, a Qing dynasty martial artist from Guangdong who competes in a martial arts contest to win the hand in marriage of a woman but finds himself caught in the conflict between an anti-Qing underground movement and Qing government forces led by the Governor of Nine Gates.

== Synopsis ==
Fang Shiyu participates in a martial arts contest staged by the couple Lei Laohu and Li Xiaohuan to win the hand-in-marriage of their daughter, Lei Tingting. He initially gains the upper hand but decides to forfeit the match after catching a glimpse of a woman whom he mistakes for Lei Tingting. Fang Shiyu's mother, Miao Cuihua, disguises herself as a man and joins the contest to help her son regain his lost pride, defeating Li Xiaohuan and winning the match. To save his mother from embarrassment, Fang Shiyu marries Lei Tingting and gets confined in his in-laws' residence, eventually seeing his bride's face after sparring with her in the dark.

Fang Shiyu's father, Fang De, returns to Guangdong from a trip and reveals that he is a member of the Red Flower Society, an underground movement seeking to overthrow the ruling Qing dynasty. Just then, Fang De is ambushed by the Governor of Nine Gates and his soldiers, who demand that Fang De hands over a list of names of the society's members. Fang Shiyu and Miao Cuihua show up to save Fang De, and Fang Shiyu manages to hold off the Governor until his parents have escaped.

The Fangs disguise themselves and hide in the Lei residence but the Governor visits the Leis and recognises the Fangs. In the ensuing fight, Li Xiaohuan is killed and Fang De is captured. The Governor then stages a public execution of Fang De to lure Fang Shiyu and Miao Cuihua in a trap. Fang Shiyu storms the execution ground alone in an attempt to save his father. At the critical moment, Miao Cuihua shows up with Chen Jialuo, the Red Flower Society's leader, and other society members. They defeat the Governor and his men, and succeed in freeing Fang De. Chen Jialuo, impressed by Fang Shiyu's bravery, takes him as his godson.

== Cast ==
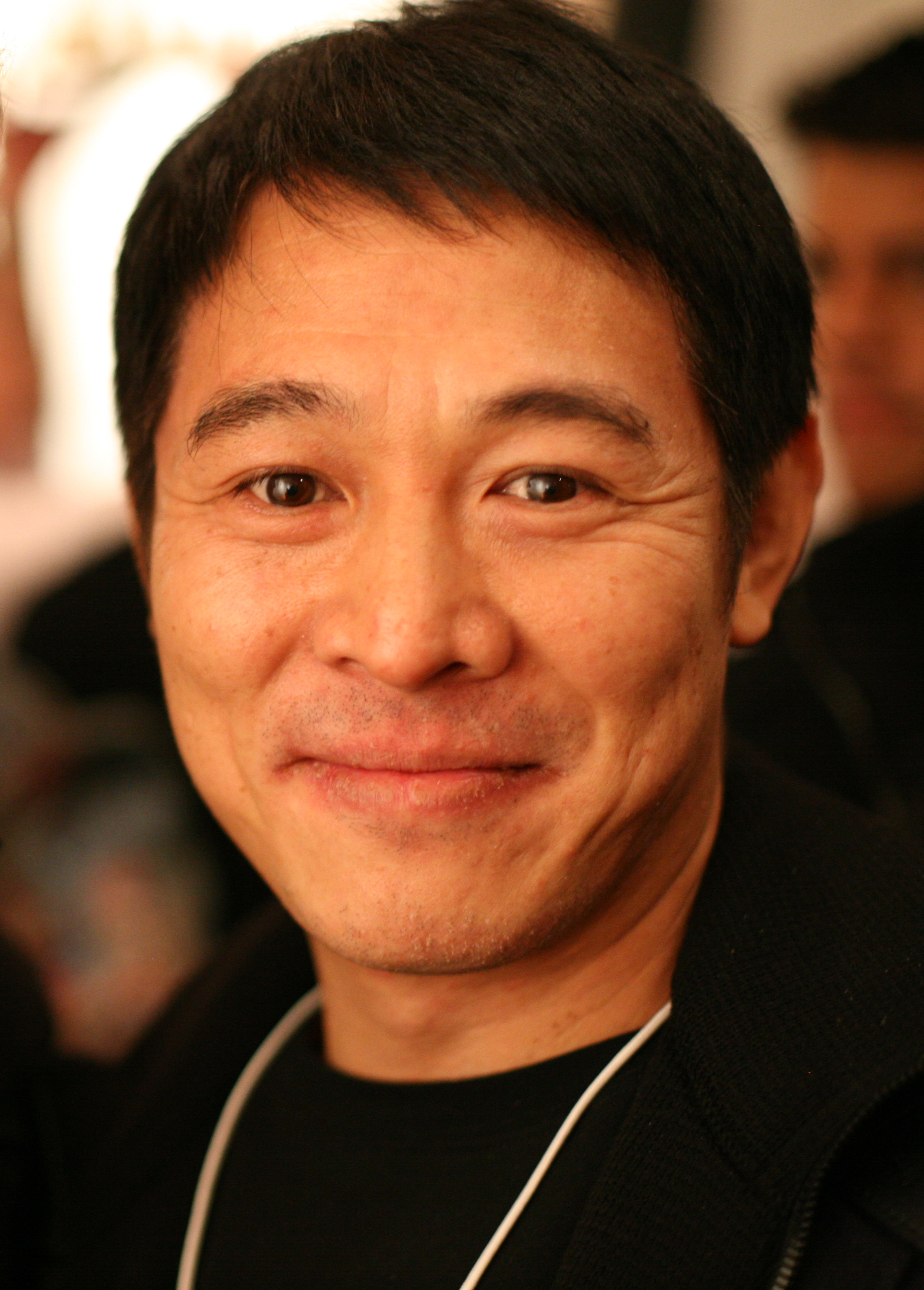
Jet Li (pictured) portrayed Fong Sai-yuk and produced the film.

- Jet Li as Fang Shiyu
- Josephine Siao as Miao Cuihua
- Vincent Zhao as the Governor of Nine Gates
- Michelle Reis as Lei Tingting
- Paul Chu as Fang De
- Sibelle Hu as Li Xiaohuan
- Chen Sung-young as Lei Laohu
- Adam Cheng as Chen Jialuo

== Release ==
Fong Sai-yuk was a box office hit on Hong Kong, grossing HK $30,666,842. In the Philippines, the film was released as The Prodigal Fighter by Viking Films on December 2, 1993. A sequel, Fong Sai-yuk II, was released in the same year.

=== Home media ===
In the United Kingdom, the film (released as Jet Li's The Legend) was watched by 1 million viewers on television in 2004, making it the year's tenth most-watched foreign-language film on television (below nine other Hong Kong action films). Fong Sai-yuk II (released as The Legend II) drew 1.5 million UK viewers the same year, adding up to a combined 2.5 million UK viewership for both films in 2004.

== Reception ==
In Hong Kong, Corey Yuen and Yuen Tak won the Hong Kong Film Award for Best Action Choreography at the 13th Hong Kong Film Awards. Josephine Siao and Cheung Yiu-chung were nominated for Best Actress and Best Editing respectively as well. At the 1993 Golden Horse Awards, Peter Cheung won the award for Best Editing, while Corey Yuen and Yuen Tak won the award for best action choreography.

The film received a positive review from Time Out London who referred to the script as "cobbled together", but praised actress Josephine Siao, noting "a show-stopping culmination of three decades of fine work in the Hong Kong cinema". The Austin Chronicle praised the film's fight choreography as the "most breathtakingly choreographed fight scenes witnessed in years", and noted the liberated female characters, calling them "a refreshing change of pace from years past, when women were frequently used as either cookie cutter stereotypes or the requisite damsels in distress". TV Guide gave the film four stars, praising both Siao and Jet Li's roles and Corey Yuen's direction stating "it's astonishing to find that the director also helmed the ridiculous Stateside kung fu fest No Retreat, No Surrender (1986), Jean-Claude Van Damme's film debut; on home ground, he proves a filmmaker of consummate skill and style".

In 2014, Time Out polled several film critics, directors, actors and stunt actors to list their top action films. Fong Sai-yuk was listed at 84th place on this list under its title The Legend.

== See also ==
- Jet Li filmography
- List of Hong Kong films of 1993
