= Ha Chi-chun =

Hong Kong actress

Ha Chi Chun (夏志珍) is a Hong Kong actress. Her ancestral hometown is Shaoguan city, Guangdong province.

== Filmography ==
- Passionate Nights (1997) - Sister Cheuk
- Come from China (1992) - Female Robber
- Fist of Fury 1991 (1991) - Flutty Ping
- Jail House Eros (1990) - The Ghost
- Final Run (1989) - Jensy
- Carry on Yakuza!! (1989) - Female Yakuza
- Widow Warriors (1989) - Female Triad in Health Club
- Angel Enforcers (1989) - Female Crime Boss
- Aces Go Places 5: The Terracotta Hit (1989) - Female Communist Agent #1
- Women's Prison (1988) - Guard
- Erotic Ghost Story (1987) - Mrs. Wang
- Eastern Condors (1986) - Guerrilla Girl #3
