= Wan Chi Keung =

Hong Kong footballer and actor (1956–2010)

Personal information
- Date of birth: 1 May 1956
- Place of birth: British Hong Kong
- Date of death: 16 February 2010 (aged 53)
- Place of death: Sha Tin, Hong Kong
- Position: Forward

Senior career*
Years	Team	Apps	(Gls)
1974–1983	South China		
1983–1984	Seiko		
1984–1985	HK Electric		
1985–1986	Seiko		(1)
1986–1988	South China		(11)
1988–1989	Double Flower		(1)

International career
1974–1975	Hong Kong U19		
1976–1986	Hong Kong	32	(18)
- * Club domestic league appearances and goals

Wan Chi Keung (simplified Chinese: 尹志强; traditional Chinese: 尹志強; Jyutping: wan^{5} zi^{3} koeng^{4}; May 1, 1956 – February 16, 2010) was a Hong Kong professional footballer, actor and businessman.

Known as "Asia's top striker" Wan was a key player for the Hong Kong national team in the 1970s and 1980s. He played for South China and Seiko in the Hong Kong First Division League. After retirement, he became an actor. His most famous role was a senior police officer in the Infernal Affairs trilogy.

Wan dated veteran actress Michelle Yim for almost 30 years.

Wan was diagnosed with nasopharyngeal carcinoma in the early 1990s but the condition improved over the years. On 16 February 2010, Wan died in Prince of Wales Hospital in Sha Tin.

== Filmography ==
- The Executor (1981) - Wai
- One Way Only (1981) - Traffic Police Sergeant
- The Head Hunter (1982) - Kenny
- Funny Boys (1982)
- The Turning Point (1983)
- 100 Ways to Murder Your Wife (1986) - Party guest
- Eastern Condors (1987) - Col Young's commando
- City Girl (1987)
- The Banquet (1991)
- Perfect Exchange (1993) - Lau Yiu Chor
- Don't Give a Damn (1995) - CID on the bus
- Candlelight's Woman (1995) - Wai
- Infernal Affairs (2002) - Officer Leung
- Infernal Affairs II (2003) - Superintendent Leung
- Infernal Affairs III (2003) - Superintendent Leung
- Moving Targets (2004) - Officer Lai
- When Beckham Met Owen (2004) - David's Father
