= Pyu language =

Pyu language may refer to:

- Pyu language (Papuan), a Papuan language of Papua New Guinea
- Pyu language (Sino-Tibetan), an ancient Sino-Tibetan language of Burma

== See also ==
- Pyu (disambiguation)
- Piu language, an Austronesian language of Papua New Guinea
- Puyuma language (ISO 639 code: pyu), an Austronesian language of Taiwan
