= She Shoots Straight =

1990 Hong Kong film by Corey Yuen

- Film poster
- Directed by: Corey Yuen
- Written by: Barry Wong; Corey Yuen; Yuen Kai-chi
- Produced by: Chan Pui-wah; Sammo Hung
- Starring: Joyce Godenzi; Carina Lau; Sammo Hung
- Cinematography: Lau Moon-Tong; Leung Chi-ming
- Edited by: Peter Cheung; Keung Chuen-tak
- Music by: Lowell Lo
- Production company: Bo Ho Film Company
- Distributed by: Golden Harvest
- Release date: 4 July 1990
- Running time: 94 minutes
- Country: Hong Kong
- Language: Cantonese

She Shoots Straight (Chinese: 皇家女將, alternately Lethal Lady) is a 1990 Hong Kong crime action film directed by Corey Yuen, and written by Yuen, Barry Wong and Yuen Kai-chi. It stars Joyce Godenzi, Carina Lau and Sammo Hung. The film was released theatrically in Hong Kong on 4 July 1990.

== Story ==
She Shoots Straight turns on three plot axes. The first concerns the complications of a workplace romance and marriage between a dedicated policewoman “Mina Kao” (Joyce Godenzi) and her supervisor “Huang Tsung-pao” (Tony Leung). The second theme concerns opposition by the Huang family to the couple's impending union. Another policewoman, Mina's future sister-in-law “Chia Ling” (Carina Lau) is especially critical of apparent favoritism, and even makes a remark about her being Eurasian (this is not unique – a comparable epithet being made by Oshima's character to her guy opponent in “Close Escape”). The third axis provides a resolution as a gang of Vietnamese led by Yuan Hua (Yuen Wah) attempts a violent and risky robbery. After the gang is thwarted, a shootout ensues in which the police get the upper hand. Swearing revenge, Yuan Hua lays a counter-trap using Vietnamese jungle warfare devices. When Chia Ling – slighted over disciplinary action – impulsively investigates alone, she risks trouble. Mina and Tsung Po rescue her, but he is killed by a booby trap, dying in front of his sister and bride. United in their grief, the women must break the news to the Huang family at a celebration for their matriarch. This paves the way for a relatively straightforward vengeance sub-plot in which Mina and Chia Ling track the gang to a freighter in the harbor. In advance of reinforcements, they board the vessel to fight a life or death duel against gang members and crew wielding pistols, hatchets, knives or tools.

== Cast ==
- Joyce Godenzi as Inspector Mina Kao (credited as Joyce Mina Godenzi)
- Carina Lau as Huang Chia-Ling
- Sammo Hung as Supt. Officer Hung
- Tony Leung as Insp. Huang Tsung-Pao
- Yuen Wah as Yuen Hua
- Agnes Aurelio as Yuen Ying
- Sarah Lee as Huang Chia-Lai
- Teddy Yip as Uncle Huang Tsung-Po
- Chung Fat as Hua
- David Lau as Superintendent Lau
- Stephen Chan as Arms dealer
- Corey Yuen as Boatman
- Cho Wing as Ship thug
- Anthony Carpio as Ship thug
- Hsu Hsia as Ship thug
- Michael Dinga as Kidnapping leader
- Jeff Falcon as Kidnapper
- Mark Houghton as Policeman
