= Eastern Condors =

1987 Hong Kong film by Sammo Hung

- Original film poster
- Directed by: Sammo Hung
- Written by: Barry Wong
- Produced by: Corey Yuen; Wu Ma; Jeffrey Lau; Leonard Ho
- Starring: Sammo Hung; Yuen Biao; Joyce Godenzi; Haing S. Ngor; Yuen Wah; Lam Ching-ying; Yuen Woo-ping; Corey Yuen; Billy Chow
- Cinematography: Au Gaam Hung; Arthur Wong
- Edited by: Peter Cheung
- Music by: Sherman Chow
- Production companies: Bo Ho Films; Paragon Films
- Distributed by: Fortune Star; Golden Harvest
- Release date: 9 July 1987
- Running time: 100 minutes
- Countries: United Kingdom; Hong Kong; Vietnam
- Languages: Cantonese; English; Vietnamese
- Box office: HK$21,606,063

Eastern Condors (Chinese: 東方禿鷹) is a 1987 Hong Kong action war film starring and directed by Sammo Hung. The film co-stars Yuen Biao, Joyce Godenzi, Yuen Wah, Lam Ching-ying, Yuen Woo-ping, Corey Yuen and Billy Chow. The film was released in Hong Kong on 9 July 1987.

== Plot ==
Lieutenant Colonel Lam is a Hong Kong-American army officer given a top-secret mission by the US military. The mission entails entering Vietnam to destroy an old American bunker filled with missiles before the Viet Cong can get to them. Colonel Yang will lead the main strike team of regular Chinese-American soldiers. Yang also asks Lam to find his brother Lung, who was left behind in Vietnam when the bunker was built.

Due to the dangerous nature of the mission, a group of 12 Chinese American convicts are selected to accompany Lam, led by Tung Ming-sun. These convicts are to act as a diversion while Colonel Yang's strike team completes their main mission. Survivors are promised a pardon, U.S. citizenship and $200,000 each. After a brief training session they are dropped into Vietnam. During the jump, Lam learns too late that the mission has been aborted. One of the convicts miscounts when to pull his parachute and dies during the landing.

Once in enemy territory, they are met by 3 Cambodian guerillas and take refuge in a small town. There they meet Rat Chieh (aka Chieh Man-yeh), and his mentally ill "Uncle", Yang-Lung. Due to a request by Colonel Yang, who died in a plane explosion off-screen, the commandos extract Yang-Lung and a reluctant Rat who is forced to tag along with the convicts.

Later, the squad is captured and incarcerated in a POW camp, where the prisoners are forced to play Russian roulette in a similar manner to the film The Deer Hunter. After escaping, Yeung-Lung is revealed to have been faking being mentally ill out of protection and reveals that one of the Cambodian guerrillas is a traitor. The Cambodians execute the traitor after she is revealed by Rat.

With the Vietnamese military in pursuit, they are able to reach the bunker, but the convicts suffer several casualties during the journey. In the bunker, Lam orders the convicts to destroy the missiles, but is wounded by the Cambodian guerilla leader who wants the missiles for themselves to destroy the Vietnamese and in the process accidentally shoots Yang-Lung dead. After a brief standoff, the Vietnamese enter the bunker forcing Tung, Rat, Lam, the Cambodians and the remaining convicts to briefly team up and fight the Vietnamese general and his elite soldiers.

During the final battle, the group manages to kill many of the Vietnamese general's elite soldiers but Lam, the Cambodians and most of the convicts are killed in the process. The only survivors are Tung, Rat and Dai Hoi, another convict helping them throughout the journey but was tempted to leave several times due to not being told the true nature of the mission. Rat attempts to fight the General, but is knocked out in the process. Tung fights and manages to defeat the Giggling General and finishes him by shoving a grenade in the general's mouth.

Tung, Rat and Dai Hoi manage to destroy the missiles and escape the bunker through an underground tunnel where they are rescued by a helicopter, presumably flown by the Americans, out of Vietnam.

== Cast ==
- Sammo Hung as Tung Ming-sun
- Yuen Biao as "Rat" / Chieh Man-yeh
- Haing S. Ngor as Lung Yeung
- Joyce Godenzi as Cambodian Guerrilla Girl Leader
- Chui Man-yan as Cambodian Guerrilla Girl #2
- Ha Chi-chun as Lau Shun Ying / Cambodian Guerrilla Girl #3
- Lam Ching-ying as Lieutenant Colonel Lam
- Melvin Wong as Colonel Yang Yeung
- Charlie Chin as Szeto Chin
- Cheung Kwok-keung as Ching Dai-kong
- Billy Lau as Ching Dai-Hoi
- Yuen Woo-ping as Grandpa Yun Yen-hoy
- Corey Yuen as Judy Wu
- Peter Chan as Ma Puk-kau / Potato Onion Head
- Chin Kar-lok as Nguyen Siu-tran
- Hsiao Ho as Phan ManlLung
- Lau Chau-sang as Stuttering Keung
- Yuen Wah as Vietnamese Giggling General
- Yasuaki Kurata as General's elite soldier
- Dick Wei as General's elite soldier
- Billy Chow as General's elite soldier
- Ng Min-kan as General's elite soldier
- James Tien as Village Thug / Angry Customer
- Phillip Ko as Vietnamese Corporal Soldier
- Wu Ma as Vietnamese Corporal Officer
- Kenny Ho as Col Young's commando
- Max Mok as Col Young's commando
- Chung Fat as Col Young's commando
- Michael Miu as Col Young's commando
- Kent Tong as Col Young's commando
- Ben Lam as Col Young's commando
- Andy Dai as Col Young's commando
- Danny Poon as Col Young's commando
- Chris Li as Col Young's commando
- Wan Chi-keung as Col Young's commando
- Paquito Diaz as Guerrilla
- Eddie Garcia as Guerrilla
- Joonee Gamboa as Guerrilla

== Production ==
The ensemble of convict soldiers in the film is reminiscent of similar squads in American action war films like The Dirty Dozen. Hung believed his normal size and body shape, whilst suited to his comedic characters in his other films, would be inappropriate for a soldier. In order to get into shape for the lead role, Hung lost 30 pounds in 3 months by surviving on a diet of nothing but chicken, rice, and low salt soy sauce. Although set in Vietnam, most of the film was shot in the Philippines. The scenes set in the United States were actually filmed in Canada.

== Theme song ==
- A Condor's Mission (禿鷹使命)
  - Composer: Jonathan Lee
  - Lyricist: Lin Xi
  - Singer: Sammo Hung, Yuen Biao, Prudence Liew, Susanne Ho, Joyce Godenzi, Billy Lau, Rosanne Lui, Woo Kin-chung, Fundamental

== Accolades ==
Accolades
Ceremony	Category	Recipient	Outcome
8th Hong Kong Film Awards	Best Supporting Actress	Joyce Godenzi	Nominated
8th Hong Kong Film Awards	Best New Performer	Ha Chi-chun	Nominated
8th Hong Kong Film Awards	Best Action Choreography	Sammo Hung, Yuen Biao, Yuen Wah, Corey Yuen, Hsiao Ho	Nominated

== Home media ==
On 2 April 2001, a Region 2 DVD was released by Hong Kong Legends in the United Kingdom.

The film was released on Blu-Ray by The Criterion Collection on December 17, 2024.

== See also ==
- List of Hong Kong films
