= Pyu (disambiguation) =

Pyu may refer to:

- Pyu, town in Taungoo District, Bago Region in Burma (Myanmar), named after the ancient Pyu kingdom of Burma
- Pyu city-states, collection of city-states of the central and northern regions of modern-day Burma (Myanmar), founded by the people of the same name
- Pyu language (disambiguation)
  - Pyu language (Sino-Tibetan), ancient Tibeto-Burman language of Southeast Asia spoken in the area of present-day Burma and Thailand
  - Pyu language (Papuan), language isolate spoken in Papua New Guinea
- Pyu Township, township in Taungoo District in the Bago Region of Burma (Myanmar)

== See also ==
- Pyū to Fuku! Jaguar, a Japanese manga series
