= Dragons Forever =

1988 Hong Kong film by Sammo Hung

- Theatrical release poster

Chinese name
- Traditional Chinese: 飛龍猛將
- Simplified Chinese: 飞龙猛将
Transcriptions
Standard Mandarin
- Hanyu Pinyin: Fēi Lóng Měng Jiāng
Yue: Cantonese
- Jyutping: Fei1 Lung4 Maang2 Zeong1
- Directed by: Sammo Hung; Corey Yuen
- Screenplay by: Roy Szeto
- Story by: Gordon Chan; Leung Yiu-ming
- Produced by: Leonard Ho
- Starring: Jackie Chan; Sammo Hung; Yuen Biao; Pauline Yeung; Deannie Yip; Yuen Wah; Roy Chiao; Crystal Kwok
- Cinematography: Jimmy Leung; Joseph Cheung
- Edited by: Joseph Chiang; Peter Cheung
- Music by: James Wong Jim
- Production companies: Golden Harvest; Paragon Films
- Distributed by: Golden Harvest
- Release date: 11 February 1988
- Running time: 94 minutes
- Country: Hong Kong
- Language: Cantonese
- Box office: US$11 million (HK/Taiwan/Japan); 179,985 tickets (Seoul)

Dragons Forever (Chinese: 飛龍猛將) is a 1988 Hong Kong martial arts action comedy film directed by Sammo Hung, who also starred in the film, and co-directed by Corey Yuen. The film co-stars Jackie Chan, Yuen Biao, Pauline Yeung, Deannie Yip, Yuen Wah, Roy Chiao, and Crystal Kwok. It is the last film in which Hung, Chan and Biao all appeared in together, as later Chan subsequently focused on his solo film career.

In the film, a lawyer is hired to discover information that would destroy a fishery owner's reputation, and undermine her legal case against a chemical factory. The lawyer employs two agents to help his cause without informing them of their respective roles in the scheme, resulting in hostile relationships between the agents. The lawyer and his agents turn against their employers when they learn that the factory is a front for the production of narcotics.

== Plot ==
A fishery is seeking court action against a local chemical factory for polluting the water. The mysterious chemical company hires lawyer Jackie Lung to find information that will discredit the fishery. He employs his friend Wong to woo the fishery owner, Miss Yip, to try and convince her to settle out of court. In addition, Lung also brings in professional criminal Tung to bug her apartment. However Wong and Tung are unaware of each other's roles and soon come into conflict, while Lung tries to maintain the peace between them.

Eventually Wong falls for Miss Yip, whilst Lung romances her cousin, Miss Wen, an environmental scientist who is going to testify on Miss Yip's behalf. Bad advice leads Tung to try and murder Miss Wen, but Lung stops him and the three men are exposed. Wong and Tung decide to investigate the chemical factory themselves, and discover it is a façade for a narcotics empire, run by Hua Hsien-Wu. Wong is captured while infiltrating the factory and Hua's men try to overdose him with intravenous drugs.

Tung brings Lung and Miss Wen to the chemical factory, where they confront Hua over the factory's true purpose and Wong's whereabouts. Although Hua claims innocence, Wong reappears to warn them, leading to a battle between Lung and Tung and Hua's men. Wong saves Miss Wen from Hua by injecting him with drugs causing him to have a fatal overdose, while Lung fatally defeats Hua's foreign henchman. The four, battered but alive, exit the factory as the police arrive.

== Versions ==
There are three distinct versions of the film: the Hong Kong theatrical release (94 minutes), the international theatrical release (94 minutes), and the Japanese theatrical release (98 minutes). Two scenes with Timothy Tung Te-Biao (Yuen Biao) visiting a psychiatrist (played by Lucky Stars veteran Stanley Fung) were cut from the domestic Hong Kong print of the film, but remain intact in the international version and the Japanese version. These scenes, titled "Couch Potato" and "Mr Kinetic", appeared as extras on the Hong Kong Legends DVD of the film. In the latter, the psychiatrist was in the process of being robbed. So that Tung would not realise a robbery was taking place, one of the robbers, posing as the psychiatrist, gave him advice over the intercom - to "kill the witnesses", which explains why Tung attacks Jackie Lung (Chan) and Nancy Lee (Pauline Yeung) in a later scene, wearing a mask and armed with a knife.

Several scenes were slightly trimmed for the international version. The only scene completely omitted shows how Tung Te-Biao leads Jackie and Nancy into the chemical factory, having informed them about the danger Wong Fei-Hung (Sammo Hung) was in. They locate a hidden door, leading to where Wong is held captive and the drugs are refined. Ling distracts the guard, allowing Jackie the opportunity to attack. This scene is intact in the Hong Kong and Japanese versions. The Japanese version is the only one that contains all scenes in their complete form, except that it replaces the original end credits crawl of the police arrival at the factory with a different end credits crawl featuring outtakes from the film.

In 2020 a limited edition Blu-ray containing fully restored transfers of all three versions was released by 88 Films.

== Cast ==
- Jackie Chan as Jackie Lung
- Sammo Hung as Wong Fei-hung
- Yuen Biao as Tung Tak-hiao
- Pauline Yeung as Wen Mei-ling
- Deannie Yip as Miss Yip
- Yuen Wah as Hua Hsien-Wu
- Roy Chiao as Judge Lo Chung-wai
- Crystal Kwok as Jackie's Assistant
- Phillip Ko as Unemployed Thug
- Dick Wei as Thug
- Stanley Fung as Tak's Psychiatrist
- Shum Wai as Lawyer
- Benny Urquidez as Thug
- Lau Kar-wing as Thug
- Fung Hark-On as Thug
- Chung Fat as Thug
- Wu Fung as Man, the Attorney
- Lam Wai as Thug
- Billy Chow as Thug
- Tai Po as Head Waiter
- Shing Fui-On as Mao Shih-cheng
- Lo Lieh as Gangster
- Chen Jing as Gun Buyer
- Lee Kar-ting as Thug
- Peter Chan as Thug

== Reception ==
On the Hong Kong Legends DVD release of Dragons Forever, Hong Kong cinema expert Bey Logan offers his opinion on why the film underperformed both in the domestic and Japanese markets. The primary reason cited is that the actors played roles against type. Jackie Chan plays a slick lawyer who chases women, in contrast to the happy-go-lucky everyman characters he usually plays. Similarly, Yuen Biao plays an eccentric and possibly mentally disturbed character, rather than the underdog character fans were used to. For Sammo Hung, rather than the timid character that has been described in earlier films, he instead plays like a rascal. Logan explains that in general, the cinema going public in Hong Kong are not as open to such departures of role as, perhaps, Western audiences would be.

Additional reasons cited include the occasional use of coarse language in the film, and the scenes of narcotics production, particularly Hung's character being injected with drugs against his will. The fact that Chan's character has a relationship with a woman may also have had an effect, particularly in the Japanese market, as many female viewers could not accept that their idol was not single. On learning that Chan was in a relationship in real life, one Japanese fan had committed suicide, and another poisoned herself in the offices of Golden Harvest.

== Box office ==
In Hong Kong, Dragons Forever grossed HK$33,578,920 (US$4,301,681) during its theatrical run. In Taiwan, it was the eight highest-grossing film of 1988, earning NT$12,429,555 (US$441,861). In Japan, where it was released as Cyclone Z, the film earned ¥800 million (US$6.24 million) at the box office. This adds up to US$10,983,542 grossed in Hong Kong, Taiwan and Japan.

In South Korea, the film sold 179,985 tickets in the capital city of Seoul.

== Awards ==
- 1989 Hong Kong Film Awards
  - Nomination: Best Action Choreography

== See also ==
- List of Hong Kong films
- Jackie Chan filmography
