= Women Prison =

1988 Hong Kong film by David Lam

- Film poster
- 女子監獄
- Directed by: David Lam
- Written by: Yin Nam
- Produced by: Teddy Robin
- Starring: Fung Bo Bo; Charine Chan; Elsie Chan; Lo Fun; Maria Cordero
- Cinematography: Lau Hung-Chuen
- Edited by: Kam Ma
- Music by: Law Kit
- Production companies: Alan & Eric Films Limited
- Distributed by: D & B Film Distribution
- Release date: 11 August 1988
- Running time: 92 minutes
- Country: Hong Kong
- Language: Cantonese
- Box office: HK$11,498,106.00

Women Prison is a Hong Kong film made by Alan & Eric Films in 1988. The film was directed by David Lam.

== Cast ==
- Fung Bo Bo as A Ain
- Charine Chan as Xiaomin
- Elsie Chan as Mui Kwai Nui
- Lo Fun as Shandong Po
- Maria Cordero as Cai Guniang
- Simon Yam as Liu Weiliang
- Ha Chi-chun as Zhu Jingjing
- Patricia Ha as He Jiahui
- Carol Cheng as Li Yulian
