= Last Hero in China =

1993 Hong Kong film by Wong Jing

- DVD cover

Chinese name
- Traditional Chinese: 黃飛鴻之鐵雞鬥蜈蚣
- Simplified Chinese: 黄飞鸿之铁鸡斗蜈蚣
Transcriptions
Standard Mandarin
- Hanyu Pinyin: Huáng Fēihóng Zhī Tiě Jī Dòu Wúgōng
Yue: Cantonese
- Jyutping: Wong4 Fei1-hong4 Zi1 Tit3 Gai1 Dau2 Ng4-gung1
- Directed by: Wong Jing
- Written by: Wong Jing
- Produced by: Jet Li
- Starring: Jet Li; Alan Chui; Sharla Cheung; Dicky Cheung; Bryan Leung; Anita Yuen; Natalis Chan; Gordon Liu
- Cinematography: Jingle Ma; Tom Lau; Ma Goon-wa; Chan Kwong-hung
- Edited by: Poon Hung
- Music by: James Wong; Mark Lui; Sherman Chow
- Production companies: Win's Entertainment; Eastern Production
- Distributed by: Golden Harvest; Gala Film Distribution Ltd.
- Release date: 1 April 1993
- Running time: 108 minutes
- Country: Hong Kong
- Languages: Cantonese; Mandarin; English
- Box office: HK$18,178,129

Last Hero in China (Chinese: 黃飛鴻之鐵雞鬥蜈蚣; lit. 'Wong Fei-Hung: Iron Rooster vs. Centipede') is a 1993 Hong Kong martial arts film written and directed by Wong Jing. It is a derivative of the Once Upon a Time in China film series, and unlike other imitations, it can be considered an unofficial spin-off or parody to some extent. It stars Jet Li as Wong Fei-hung, reprising his role from the first three China films, with martial arts choreography by Yuen Woo-ping, who worked on the second film, along with series composer James Wong Jim. It was also distributed by Golden Harvest, which distributed the China films.

However Last Hero in China differs greatly in tone from the Once Upon a Time in China films as it contains stronger elements of violence and broader, more slapstick, comedy. The film contains some Easter eggs, such as a Lifebuoy poster in the 19th century, a staff of the Monkey King, a guandao and Ne Zha's Universe Ring.

== Plot ==
Wong Fei-Hung now has his own school of Kung fu, but its premises have become too small for his numerous students. Two of his disciples, Leung Foon and "Bucktooth" So succeed in finding an agreement with the owner of a vacant house. The school thus changes location. Unfortunately, Wong Fei-Hung's new school building is next to a "love hotel", which is unacceptable for the Master, although less so for his young students. Even worse, a new general wants Wong gone at any cost, for fear that he will reveal the general's dirty secrets.

== Cast ==
- Jet Li as Wong Fei-hung
- Alan Chui as Lui Yat-siu
- Sharla Cheung as Ti Yin-er
- Dicky Cheung as "Bucktooth" So
- Leung Kar Yan as Leung Foon
- Anita Yuen as Miss Nine
- Natalis Chan as Mass Tar Wong
- Kingdom Yuen as San Gu
- Linda Cheung as hooker
- Gordon Liu as Master Liu Hung
- Dion Lam as convicted robber and rapist
- Wong Tin-lam as member of Moral Reform Society
- Pak Man-biu as Uncle Cheung
- Szema Wah Lung as member of four com. associations
- Law Ho-kai as Robert
- Chung Fat as Yuen Lung
- Yuen Miu as Yuen Po
- Jimmy Au as Yuen Fu
- Julie Lee as woman chased through the woods
- Jackson Ng as young master molesting Yin-er
- Jue Tit-who as Yin-er's father
- Isabel Leung as hooker
- Gam Biu as magistrate
- Chun Kwai-bo as Nun Yah's bad monk
- Chu Tau as constable who beat Mass Tar Wong
- Chow Gam-kong as young master's servant
- Lui Tat as master of Nun Yah Temple
- Ku Tin-yi as hooker
- Roy Filler as Benjamin
- Chan Siu-wah as monk
- Ling Chi-hung as landlord's representative
- Lee Hang as constable
- Lam Kwok-git as constable / Master Wong's disciple
- Cheung Chun-hung as Master Wong's disciple
- So Wai-naam as Master Wong's disciple

== Release and other titles ==
Last Hero in China was released in Hong Kong on 1 April 1993. In the Philippines, the film was released as Once Upon a Time in China-2 by Solar Films on 1 July 1993.

The film also had alternative titles for other, later releases, including:

- Claws of Steel (DVD release 22 January 2003)
- Deadly China Hero (DVD release 27 January 2004)
- Iron Rooster vs. Centipede (DVD release 7 January 2005)
