= Fong Sai-yuk II =

1993 Hong Kong film by Corey Yuen

- Promotional artwork
- 方世玉續集
- Directed by: Corey Yuen
- Written by: John Chan; Jeff Lau
- Produced by: Jet Li
- Starring: Jet Li; Josephine Siao; Adam Cheng; Michele Reis; Amy Kwok; Corey Yuen
- Cinematography: Mark Lee
- Edited by: Angie Lam
- Music by: Lowell Lo; Stephen Shing
- Production company: Eastern Production
- Distributed by: Gala Film Distribution
- Release date: 30 July 1993
- Running time: 96 minutes
- Country: Hong Kong
- Language: Cantonese
- Box office: HK$23,013,797

Fong Sai-yuk II (方世玉續集), also known as The Legend II, The Legend of Fong Sai-yuk II, and Once Upon a Time in China 6, is a 1993 Hong Kong action-comedy film directed by Corey Yuen, starring Jet Li as Chinese folk hero Fong Sai-yuk (Fang Shiyu). The film is a sequel to Fong Sai-yuk, which was released earlier in the same year. Two former Miss Hong Kong Pageant winners, Michele Reis and Amy Kwok, portrayed Fang Shiyu's wives.

== Synopsis ==
After defeating Commander Erduo, Fong Sai-Yuk, Lei Ting-Ting, and his mother (Miu Choi-Fa) took refuge and became members of Red Flower Society, an underground movement seeking to overthrow the ruling Qing dynasty. Fang's godfather, Chan Ka-Lok), leads the society and hopes to groom Sai-Yuk to succeed him. Yu Tsan-Hoi, Ka-Lok's ruthless deputy, is jealous of Sai-Yuk and tries to sabotage him. Unknown to most of the society's members, Ka-Lok is a long-lost brother of the Qianlong Emperor and he is worried that they might question his loyalty to their cause if they discover his true identity. Meanwhile, some rōnin discover evidence of Chen's background and attempt to pass it to the emperor in a red box.

Ka-Lok sends Sai-Yuk and others to intercept the rōnin and retrieve the evidence, but Sai-Yuk gets distracted along the way and focuses on rescuing Princess Man-Yin, a woman in distress. Sai-Yuk is nearly killed by the rōnin until his mother, Choi-Fa, shows up and saves him. Nevertheless, the rōnin escape and pass the box to Suen Si-Ngai, the Viceroy of Guangdong. The woman whom Sai-Yuk rescued earlier is Princess Suen Man-Yin, the viceroy's daughter. Sai-Yuk then enters a martial arts contest to win Man-Yin's hand-in-marriage as part of a plan to steal the box from the viceroy, but the viceroy is aware and sets a trap for Sai-Yuk. However, Man-Yin has fallen in love with Sai-Yuk and married him genuinely, so she forces her father to release Sai-Yuk.

Sai-Yuk returns to his godfather and lies that he has failed to retrieve the box. Yu uses the chance to remind Ka-Lok that Sai-Yuk had promised earlier that he would permanently disable himself if he fails the mission, so Ka-Lok is forced to cripple Sai-Yuk, rendering him unable to practise martial arts again. In reality, the severing was a ruse and Sai-Yuk only needed time to recover. Meanwhile, Yu incites the society to turn against Ka-Lok, imprisoning Ka-Lok and seizing the leadership position. When Yu captures Miao, Fang goes to confront Yu and blindfolds himself so that he would not see his fellow society members spilling blood while fighting them. Eventually, Fang defeats Yu and saves his godfather and restores him to the leadership position. Fang's two wives come to terms with each other, while Fang announces that he is retiring from the jianghu to lead a peaceful life with his family.

== Cast ==
- Jet Li as Fong Sai-Yuk
- Josephine Siao as Miu Choi-Fa
- Adam Cheng as Chan Ka-Lok
- Michele Reis as Lei Ting-Ting
- Amy Kwok as Princess Suen Man-Yin
- Corey Yuen as Li Guobang
- Ji Chunhua as Yu Zhenhai
- Peter Chan as Magu

== Release ==
Fong Sai-yuk II was released on 30 July 1993. In the Philippines, the film was released Solar Films as Once Upon a Time in China 6 on 30 August 1995, connecting the film to Jet Li's unrelated Once Upon a Time in China film series.

== Home media ==
In the United Kingdom, the film, released as The Legend II, was watched by 1.5 million viewers on television in 2004, making it the year's third most-watched foreign-language film on television after Crouching Tiger, Hidden Dragon and First Strike. The original Fong Sai-yuk (released as Jet Li's The Legend) drew 1 million viewers in the United Kingdom in the same year, adding up to a combined 2.5 million viewership for both films in 2004.

== Alternate versions ==
=== American version ===
The DVD release published by Dimension is dubbed in English and contains different music cues compared to the original Hong Kong Universe version. The Hong Kong prints come in different releases such as Universe Old version DVD (embedded subtitles), Universe Remastered DVD (optional subs), Universe VCD (embedded subtitles, based on the old release), and the Tai Seng VHS (also based on the old release). The American version, released as The Legend II, cuts out a scene where Corey Yuen is naked while leaving the rest of the film intact. The remastered Universe DVD maintains a red tint throughout the entire film except in night scenes.

=== Taiwanese version ===
The Taiwanese version, released as Kungfu Emperor 2 (功夫皇帝2) and dubbed in Mandarin, is distributed by Scholar/Taiwan and runs longer than all other versions, including some scenes that were cut out from other releases. The opening sequence of the film shows a white screen with red Chinese credits. The Hong Kong version has English credits while the Taiwanese version does not. The Taiwanese version includes some scenes that were omitted in other versions.

The Taiwanese version also uses Jet Li's original voice in Mandarin. The up and down black bars move up and down because of film transfer and does not feature the red tint featured in the Hong Kong remastered DVD.
