= Lowell Lo =

Hong Kong singer-songwriter and film composer

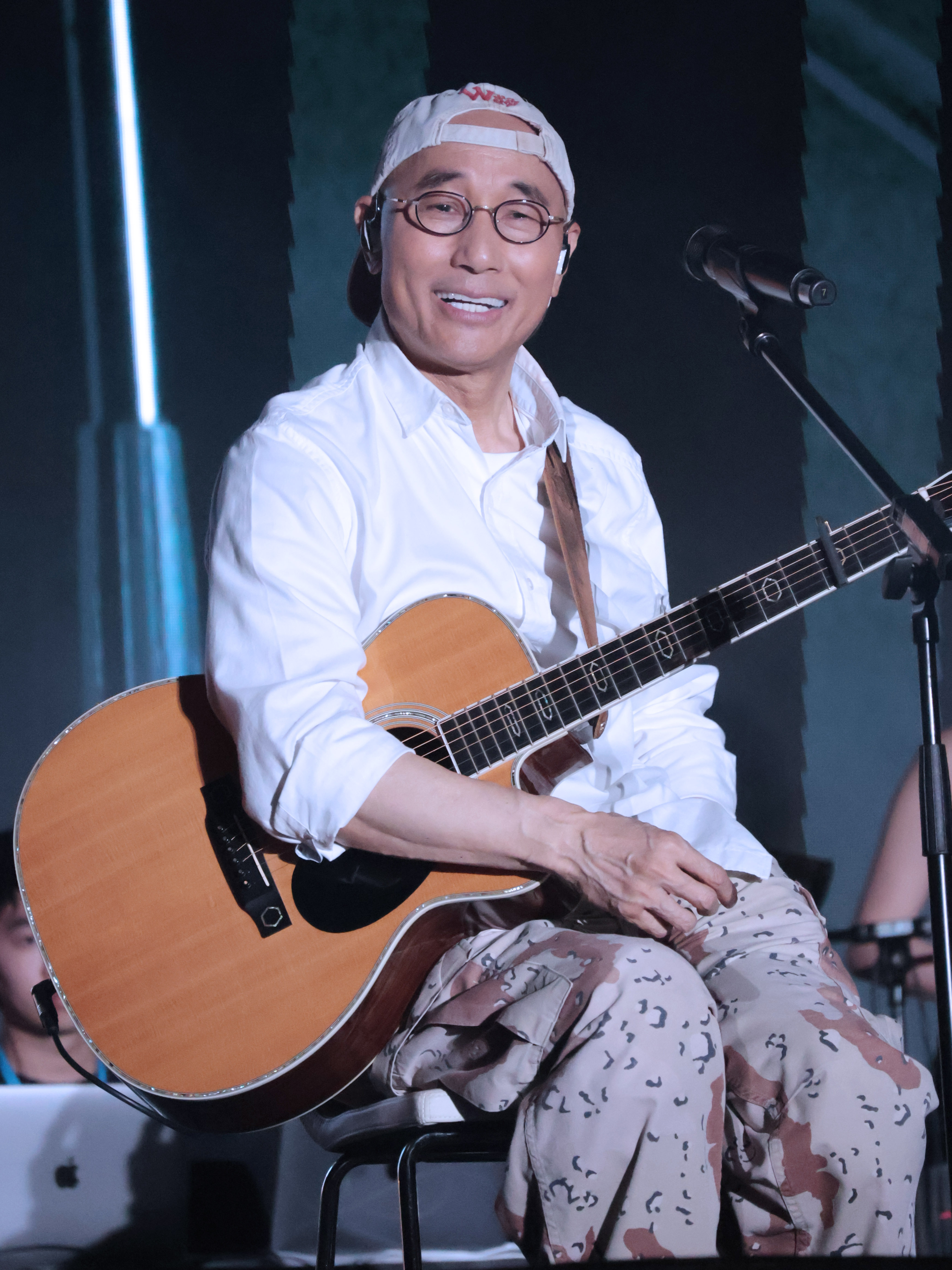
- Lo in 2024
- Born: Lo Kwok Fu (盧國富); 12 October 1950 (age 75); British Hong Kong
- Occupations: Singer-songwriter; actor; film composer
- Years active: 1982–present
- Awards: Hong Kong Film Awards – Best Original Film Song; 1987 Passion; 1990 Pedicab Driver; 2010 Echoes of the Rainbow

Chinese name
- Traditional Chinese: 盧冠廷
- Simplified Chinese: 卢冠廷
Transcriptions
Standard Mandarin
- Hanyu Pinyin: Lú Guàntíng
Yue: Cantonese
- Jyutping: Lou4 Gun3ting4
- Musical career
- Genre: Cantopop
- Instruments: Vocals, guitar, piano
- Labels: Rock; EMI

Lowell Lo Kwun Ting (Chinese: 盧冠廷, born 12 October 1950) is a Hong Kong singer-songwriter, actor and film composer. He wrote the film scores to many Hong Kong films, and in particular, the theme music of the Hong Kong Film Awards. He is now also an environmental activist.

== Early life ==
Lowell Lo Kwun Ting was born on 12 October 1950 in Hong Kong. Both his parents are opera singers. At the age of 16, he and his family moved to Seattle in the United States. There, he was a family friend of Bruce Lee. In 1977, he returned to Hong Kong.

== Filmography ==
=== Films ===
- Find Your Voice (2019)
- Sons of the Neon Night (2019)
- Crossing Hennessy (2010)
- Black Rose II (1997)
- How to Meet the Lucky Stars (1996)
- Spider Woman (1995)
- She Shoots Straight (1990)
- Magnificent Warriors (1987)
