= Mount Biao =

Volcanic peak in Equatorial Guinea

- Location within Equatorial Guinea

Highest point
- Elevation: 2,009 m (6,591 ft)
- Coordinates: 3.3578°N 8.6336°E

Geography
- Country: Equatorial Guinea
- Island: Bioko

Mount Biao (Spanish: Pico Biaó) is a volcanic peak on the island of Bioko in Equatorial Guinea. It has a crater lake, Lago Biaó, located in its caldera. It has steep slopes and At 2009 metres above sea level, it is the third highest point on the island and in the country.
