= War (2007 film) =

2007 film by Philip Atwell

- Theatrical release poster
- Directed by: Philip G. Atwell
- Written by: Lee Anthony Smith; Gregory J. Bradley
- Produced by: Steve Chasman; Christopher Petzel; Jim Thompson
- Starring: Jet Li; Jason Statham; John Lone; Devon Aoki; Luis Guzmán; Saul Rubinek; Ryo Ishibashi; Sung Kang; Mathew St. Patrick; Nadine Velazquez
- Cinematography: Pierre Morel
- Edited by: Scott Richter
- Music by: Brian Tyler
- Production companies: Lionsgate; Fierce Entertainment; Mosaic Media Group
- Distributed by: Lionsgate
- Release date: August 24, 2007
- Running time: 103 minutes
- Country: United States
- Languages: English; Cantonese; Japanese; Mandarin
- Budget: $25 million
- Box office: $40.7 million

War is a 2007 American action thriller film directed by Philip G. Atwell in his directorial debut and featuring stage combat choreographed by Corey Yuen. The film stars Jet Li and Jason Statham in their second cinematic pairing (after the 2001 film The One), with John Lone, Devon Aoki, and Luis Guzmán appearing in supporting roles. The plot follows FBI agent Crawford (Statham) who is determined to track down and kill a mysterious assassin known as Rogue (Li) after his partner and family are murdered, dragging him into a brutal turf war between rival Triad and Yakuza factions.

War's working title was Rogue; it was changed to avoid conflict with another film with the same name. It was re-titled as Rogue Assassin in New Zealand, Japan, Hong Kong, Singapore, India, Australia, the Philippines and several European countries.

The film was released in the United States on August 24, 2007. It grossed $40.7 million at the box office against the $25 million budget and received generally negative reviews from critics.

== Plot ==
During a shootout against Japanese yakuza at a San Francisco dock warehouse, FBI agents John Crawford and Tom Lone stumble across the notorious assassin Rogue, a former CIA assassin who now works for the yakuza.

Rogue ambushes Crawford and is about to execute him when Lone appears and shoots him in the face, causing him to fall into the water. Rogue's body is never found and he is presumed dead. However, Rogue survives and retaliates against Lone by killing him, his wife and his daughter. He then burns down the house, and leaves their corpses in the ashes.

Three years later, Rogue re-appears, working under Chinese Triad boss Li Chang. While working with Chang, he secretly instigates a war between the Triads and the yakuza, led by Shiro Yanagawa. Rogue first attacks a club run by the yakuza by killing the gangsters and later on the runners in order to recover a pair of antique gold horses; Chang's family heirlooms.

Now the head agent of the FBI's Asian Organised Crime Unit, Crawford is determined to hunt Rogue down and exact revenge for Lone's death. Crawford's obsessive pursuit of him takes a toll on his personal life, causing him to be estranged from his family. He comes close to catching Rogue in the wake of his various killing sprees against the Triads and yakuza, but Rogue always manages to stay one step ahead.

Ultimately, Rogue's actions have gained the trust of both Chang and Yanagawa. He succeeds in killing Chang, but spares Chang's wife and child, turning on the yakuza. With Chang dead, Yanagawa appears in America, intending to expand his business operations. However, he is confronted by Crawford and the FBI; although Crawford presents Yanagawa with proof that Rogue has betrayed him and spared Chang's family, he refuses to assist him in locating Rogue.

Later, Rogue delivers the horses to Yanagawa personally, who turns around and demands the location of Chang's family. Rogue kills all of Yanagawa's men, then engages in a sword fight against Yanagawa himself. Yanagawa discovers he is not the real Rogue, who was killed when attempting to assassinate Lone - he is in fact Lone himself, who surgically altered himself to assume the assassin's identity.

Lone reveals that his actions have all been designed to bring him face-to-face with Yanagawa, to kill the man who ordered the death of his family. Yanagawa reveals that Crawford had been in his pocket the whole time and responsible for leaking Lone's identity and home address to the real Rogue. Angered, Lone disarms and decapitates Yanagawa.

Meanwhile, Chang's wife receives a package from Lone containing one of the two golden horses and a message reading, "Make a new life". Yanagawa's daughter also receives a package with the same message, and inside the box is her father's head. Lone then calls Crawford as he is packing up his office, asking him to meet him at the dock warehouse where they last made their investigation. Before going to the warehouse, Crawford enlists the help of FBI sniper Goi, who aided Crawford throughout the investigation.

At the warehouse, Crawford and Lone battle each other in an intense hand-to-hand fight in which Lone reveals his true identity to Crawford. Devastated, Crawford reveals that it was true that he was working for Yanagawa at the time, but had no idea that Rogue was still alive. He was then blackmailed into giving Lone's address to Yanagawa, thinking that Yanagawa's men were only going there to "rough him up a bit". Ever since, Crawford was angry at himself and wanted revenge against Rogue and those involved in what he thought was his partner's death.

Crawford asks for forgiveness, but Lone refuses. Crawford jumps in front of Goi's line of sight to prevent a kill shot. Lone shoots Crawford in the back, killing him. The next day, Lone drives out of town to start a new life.

== Cast ==
- Jet Li as Rogue, a notorious international hitman whose real identity is Tom Lone, former CIA Agent and former field partner of John Crawford.
  - Terry Chen played Lone before he changed his face
- Jason Statham as FBI agent John Crawford, a corrupt FBI agent former field partner of Tom Lone.
- John Lone as Li Chang, a powerful Chinese mafia boss in San Francisco, Maria's husband, Ana's father, Shiro Yanagawa's archenemy, and Rogue's employer
- Mathew St. Patrick as Wick
- Sung Kang as Goi, an FBI agent fresh out of Quantico.
- Luis Guzmán as Benny
- Saul Rubinek as Dr. Sherman
- Devon Aoki as Kira Yanagawa, a yakuza heiress who is the daughter of Shiro Yanagawa, the powerful boss of the Tokyo yakuza.
- Ryo Ishibashi as Shiro Yanagawa, a notorious and powerful yakuza boss from Tokyo, Japan who comes to the US to take over the Triad's territories. He is the archenemy of Li Chang and Rogue and the father of Kira Yanagawa.
- Mark Cheng as Wu Ti, one of Li Cheng's henchmen and brother of Joey Ti
- Johnson Phan as Joey Ti, one of Li Cheng's henchmen and brother of Wu Ti
- Nicholas Elia as Daniel Crawford, the son of John and Jenny Crawford
- Nadine Velazquez as Maria Chang, Li Chang's wife and Ana's mother
- Kennedy Lauren Montano as Ana Chang, the daughter of Li Chang and Maria Chang
- Steph Song as Diane Lone, Tom Lone's late wife who was murdered in the beginning of the movie.
- Andrea Roth as Jenny Crawford, John's wife and Daniel's mother
- Kenneth Choi as Takada, one of Shiro Yanagawa's henchmen
- Peter Shinkoda as Harbour Yanagawa Member, one of Shiro Yanagawa's henchmen
- Angela Fong as Kabuki Dancer
- Kane Kosugi as Temple Garden Warrior
- Dario Delacio as Mahjong Player

== Reception ==
=== Box office ===
War opened on August 24, 2007, with $9.8 million from 2,277 theaters, a $4,312 average. As of December 2007, the film grossed $22.5 million in the United States and $18.2 million in international box offices, totaling $40.7 million. DVD sales totaled $28 million.

=== Critical response ===
On the review aggregator website Rotten Tomatoes, 14% of 59 critics' reviews are positive, with an average rating of 3.9/10. The website's consensus reads: "Jet Li and Jason Statham find themselves on opposing sides in the immensely boring War, which is full of clichés but short on action." Metacritic, which uses a weighted average, assigned the film a score of 36 out of 100, based on 15 critics, indicating "generally unfavorable" reviews. Audiences surveyed by CinemaScore gave the film a grade B.

Paul Semel of Premiere wrote, "War is like Statham's other actioners The Transporter and Crash -- fun, but not big or dumb enough to be glorious." Joe Leydon of Variety magazine wrote "Quickly devolves into a standard-issue crime drama laced with routine martial artistry."

In 2014, Time Out polled several film critics, directors, actors and stunt actors to list their top action films of all time. War was listed at the 93rd place on this list.

== Soundtrack ==
War

Soundtrack album by Brian Tyler
- Released: August 21, 2007
- Length: 65:09
- Label: Lionsgate Records

The soundtrack was composed by Brian Tyler. The additional music is by RZA, Mark Batson and Machines of Loving Grace.

1. "Spyked" – 2:31
2. "War Opening Titles" – 5:05
3. "Confession" – 3:05
4. "Rooftop Pursuit" – 1:44
5. "Whips" – 2:14
6. "Swordfight" – 5:16
7. RZA – "Rogue Cleans Da Hizouse" – 2:15
8. "Getting Started / Scene of the Crime" – 2:51
9. Mark Batson – "The Set Up / Mr. Chang Sends Regards" – 2:36
10. "Shiro Comes to Town" – 3:55
11. "Bangkok Downtown" – 2:18
12. "This Isn't Japan" – 2:16
13. "Cop Hunting / Face to Face" – 2:42
14. Mark Batson – "Compliments of Mr. Chang" – 0:36
15. "Rogue's Revenge" – 1:09
16. "Showdown" – 2:49
17. "Plans for Retaliation" – 4:00
18. "Watching the Changes" – 0:45
19. "Shiro's Estate" – 2:33
20. "War End Credits" – 5:31
21. Machines of Loving Grace – " King" – 4:04
22. "War Opening Titles (Remix)" – 4:54

The Japanese version uses "Strong Style" by Kreva.
