= List of The Book and the Sword characters =

List of characters from the novel The Book and the Sword by Jin Yong

The following is a list of characters from the novel The Book and the Sword by Jin Yong (Louis Cha). Some of these characters also appear in The Young Flying Fox, another of Jin Yong's works.

== Main characters ==
- Chen Jialuo (陳家洛) is the protagonist. Born in the Chen family of Haining, he was sent to southern Xinjiang at a young age to learn martial arts from Yuan Shixiao. After returning to central China, he joined the Red Flower Society and eventually became its chief after the death of its former chief, Yu Wanting, who was also his godfather. He is described in the novel as a handsome young man with a refined demeanour who is not only highly-skilled in martial arts, but also well-versed in the four scholarly arts. He also appears in The Young Flying Fox, in which he is mistaken for Fuk'anggan because of their similar appearances.
- Huoqingtong (霍青桐), nicknamed "Emerald Feather and Yellow Dress" (翠羽黃衫), is the elder daughter of Muzhuolun, a Uyghur tribal chief in southern Xinjiang. Having been trained by Guan Mingmei, she is highly-skilled in martial arts, especially swordsmanship. A resourceful military leader, she has also once led the Uyghurs to victory in one battle against Qing forces even though they were outnumbered. She is described in the novel as a beautiful, charismatic young woman dressed in yellow and wearing a green feather in her hat, hence her nickname.
- Kasili (喀絲麗), based on the historical Fragrant Concubine, is Huoqingtong's younger sister. She is described in the novel as having an enchanting, angelic appearance which would make any man stop in his tracks upon seeing her. Kind-hearted and innocent, she exudes a floral fragrance which gives her the name Princess Fragrance (香香公主).
- The Qianlong Emperor (乾隆皇帝) is the main antagonist and the ruler of the Qing Empire. Born in the Chen family of Haining, he had been switched with a newborn daughter of the Yongzheng Emperor shortly after his birth, and had been raised as a prince before he eventually became the emperor. He is described in the novel as a lean, dignified-looking man around the age of 40, and Chen Jialuo feels a sense of familiarity upon meeting him for the first time.

== Red Flower Society ==
The Red Flower Society (紅花會) is a secret society aiming to overthrow the Manchu-led Qing dynasty and restore Han Chinese rule in China. It is led by 15 leaders with Chen Jialuo as their chief.

- Taoist Wuchen (無塵道長), nicknamed "Soul-chasing, Life-taking Sword" (追魂奪命劍), is the second leader. Although he has lost his left arm, he retains his formidable prowess in martial arts, specialising in "72 Styles of Soul-chasing and Life-taking Swordplay" (七十二路追魂奪命劍) and "Linked Mizong Kicks" (連環迷蹤腿).
- Zhao Banshan (趙半山), nicknamed "Thousand Arms Buddha" (千臂如來), is the third leader. He is originally from the Taiji School (太極門) of Wenzhou and specialises in Taiji Fist and Taiji Swordplay, as well as the use of anqi (hand-thrown projectiles).
- Wen Tailai (文泰來), nicknamed "Thunderbolt Hand" (奔雷手), is the fourth leader and Luo Bing's husband. He specialises in the "Thunderbolt Palm" (霹靂掌) and "Thunderbolt Saber" (奔雷刀法). At the start of the novel, the Qianlong Emperor sends his men to ambush and arrest him to prevent him from revealing the secret behind the emperor's origin. His fellows make several attempts to rescue him before eventually succeeding.
- Chang Hezhi (常赫志) and Chang Bozhi (常伯志), nicknamed "Black Impermanence" (黑無常) and "White Impermanence" (白無常) respectively, are a pair of twin brothers who serve as the fifth and sixth leaders respectively. The brothers are originally from the Qingcheng Sect (青城派) and specialise in the "Black Sand Palm" (黑沙掌). They often disguise themselves as the Black and White Guards of Impermanence respectively.
- Xu Tianhong (徐天宏), nicknamed "Martial Zhuge" (武諸葛), is the seventh leader who serves as the society's strategist. He was originally at odds with Zhou Qi and often argues with her, but later falls in love with her and marries her after they escape from danger together.
- Yang Chengxie (楊成協), nicknamed "Iron Pagoda" (鐵塔), is the eighth leader. Originally the chief of the Green Flag Clan (青旗幫), he was defeated by Taoist Wuchen, who managed to convince him to join the Red Flower Society. He specialises in using the hard whip.
- Wei Chunhua (衛春華), nicknamed "Colourful Leopard with Nine Lives" (九命錦豹子), is the ninth leader. He is known for his courage in battle and has never been seriously wounded before, hence his nickname.
- Zhang Jin (章進), nicknamed "Rock Daring" (石敢當), is the hunchbacked tenth leader and the most eccentric among the leaders. He is killed during the battle in the palace at the end of the novel.
- Luo Bing (駱冰), nicknamed "Mandarin Ducks Saber" (鴛鴦刀), is the 11th leader and Wen Tailai's wife. She specialises in using a pair of sabers in combat.
- Shi Shuangying (石雙英), nicknamed "Ghosts Fret When They See Me" (鬼見愁), is the 12th leader who specialises in neijia fist styles. Known for his stern and serious demeanour, he serves as the society's chief enforcer of rules.
- Jiang Sigen (蔣四根), nicknamed "Copper-headed Crocodile" (銅頭鱷魚), is the 13th leader. He specialises in "Lu Zhishen's Crazy Demon Staff" (魯智深瘋魔杖) and uses an iron oar in place of a monk's spade.
- Yu Yutong (余魚同), nicknamed "Golden Flute Scholar" (金笛秀才), is the 14th leader. He plays and uses a golden dizi (flute) as his weapon. Having had a crush on Luo Bing for a long time, he attempts to comfort her when her husband is captured, and uses the chance to confess his feelings to her. However, she instantly rejects him and scolds him for having such immoral thoughts, causing him to feel ashamed of himself. At the same time, Yu Yutong is also aware that Li Yuanzhi has romantic feelings for him but he has been treating her coldly all this while because he still maintains his crush on Luo Bing. In the middle of the novel, he feels guilty for having hurt both Luo Bing and Li Yuanzhi emotionally, so he becomes a Buddhist monk to escape from the vicissitudes of life. However, when he learns that the society is in trouble, he decides to return to secular life to help them. With help from his fellows, he eventually accepts Li Yuanzhi's love and marries her.
- Xinyan (心硯) is Chen Jialuo's servant who later becomes the society's 15th leader.
- Yu Wanting (于萬亭), who is only mentioned by name in the novel as he is already long dead, was Chen Jialuo's godfather and the former chief of the society. He was also a secular member of the Shaolin Sect.

== Wudang Sect ==
- Zhang Zhaozhong (張昭重), nicknamed "Fiery Hand Judge" (火手判官), is a highly-skilled Wudang swordsman. Tempted by wealth and fame, he decides to leave Wudang and serve the Qing government. He becomes a trusted henchman of the Qianlong Emperor and executes his master's orders ruthlessly. He is defeated by Chen Jialuo and his companions in the middle of the novel and taken back to Wudang by Ma Zhen for rehabilitation. He turns against Ma Zhen later and escapes from Wudang. During his final confrontation with the Red Flower Society, he falls into a valley and ends up being devoured by ravenous wolves.
- Ma Zhen (馬真) is Wudang's leader and the senior of Lu Feiqing and Zhang Zhaozhong. He is also Yu Yutong's martial arts master. When Zhang Zhaozhong was defeated by Chen Jialuo and his friends in the middle of the novel, he pleads with them to spare Zhang Zhaozhong's life and promises that he will rehabilitate his junior. Zhang Zhaozhong later turns against him and defeats him in a duel, blinding him and cutting off his left leg. Ma Zhen eventually commits suicide by smashing his head against a wall.
- Lu Feiqing (陸菲青), nicknamed "Needle in Cotton" (綿裡針), is Zhao Banshan's sworn brother and Ma Zhen's junior. A highly-skilled swordsman and anqi thrower, he was formerly an anti-Qing resistance fighter and a wanted fugitive. He went into hiding by disguising himself as a scholar named "Lu Gaozhi" (陸高止) and becoming a private tutor in Li Yuanzhi's house. One day, Li Yuanzhi chances upon him using his anqi skill and soon learns who he truly is. In exchange for keeping his identity secret, he agrees to train her in martial arts. He becomes a close ally of Chen Jialuo and the Red Flower Society.

== Shaolin Sect ==
- Tianhong (天虹) is the Shaolin abbot who spars with Chen Jialuo when the latter visits Shaolin. He is killed when the Qing soldiers attack and burn down the monastery.
- Tianjing (天鏡) is Tianhong's junior who also spars with Chen Jialuo.
- Dachi (大癡), Dadian (大癲) and Daku (大苦) are three Shaolin monks who spar with Chen Jialuo.

== Qing forces ==
- Fuk'anggan (福康安) is a Manchu general who is actually an illegitimate son of the Qianlong Emperor. He resembles his uncle Chen Jialuo in appearance. The emperor appoints him as the Nine Gates Infantry Commander. In the final battle at the palace, he is captured by the Red Flower Society's members, who use him as a hostage to force the emperor to come to a truce with them.
- Bai Zhen (白振), nicknamed "Golden Claw Iron Hook" (金爪鐵鉤), is a martial artist originally from the Songyang Sect (嵩陽派). He serves as one of the emperor's top bodyguards.
- Chu Yuan (褚圓), nicknamed "A Reed Crossing the River" (一葦渡江), is a former Buddhist monk who was expelled from his monastery for violating rules. He serves as one of the emperor's top bodyguards.
- Long Jun (龍駿) is one of the emperor's bodyguards.
- Fan Zhong'en (范中恩) is one of the emperor's bodyguards who is killed by Chen Jialuo.
- Ma Jingxia (馬敬俠) is one of the emperor's bodyguards. While protecting the emperor, he is stabbed in the heart and killed by Chen Zhengde.
- Rui Dalin (瑞大林) is one of the emperor's bodyguards killed by Wen Tailai.
- Cheng Huang (成璜) is one of the emperor's bodyguards killed by Tianjin.
- Hu Guodong (胡國棟) is a famous chief constable from Beijing.
- Li Kexiu (李可秀) is the provincial military commander of Zhejiang and Li Yuanzhi's father.
- Zhaohui (兆惠) is a Manchu general who leads the Qing army to attack southern Xinjiang.
- Heshen (和珅) is a high-ranking Manchu aristocrat and close aide of the Qianlong Emperor.
- Ji Yun (紀昀)
- Zheng Xie (鄭燮)

== Scholars, poets and artists ==
- Yuan Mei (袁枚)
- Shen Deqian (沈德潛)
- Zhao Yi (趙翼)
- Jiang Shiquan (蔣士銓)
- Li E (厲鶚)

== Allies and associates of the Red Flower Society ==
=== Iron Courage Manor ===
Iron Courage Manor (鐵膽莊) is the manor where the Zhou family lives until it is burnt down.

- Zhou Zhongying (周仲英) is the manor's master and a reputable martial artist who uses a pair of Baoding balls in combat. He kills his only son in anger after learning that the boy has disgraced him, but he deeply regrets later although he constantly tries to hide his remorse. He becomes a close ally of the Red Flower Society and intends to let his son-in-law, Xu Tianhong, become his successor.
- Zhou Zhongying's wife is the mother of Zhou Qi and Zhou Yingjie. She resents her husband and leaves him after he killed their son in anger. Zhou Zhongying deeply regrets his action later and tries to patch up with his wife. With help from Zhou Qi and the Red Flower Society, the Zhou couple eventually reconcile with each other.
- Zhou Qi (周綺), nicknamed "Pretty Li Kui" (俏李逵), is Zhou Zhongying's daughter. She was originally at odds with Xu Tianhong and often bickers and argues with him. The two of them forge close ties after braving danger and narrowly escaping death together. They are married eventually.
- Zhou Yingjie (周英傑) is Zhou Zhongying's ten-year-old son. Zhang Zhaozhong taunts him when he refuses to reveal Wen Tailai's hiding place. The indignant boy responds to the insults and unsuspectingly spills the beans. Wen Tailai and Luo Bing have no choice but to come out and fight with Zhang Zhaozhong and his men. They are outnumbered and Wen Tailai is injured and captured. Zhou Zhongying was not at home when these events took place. When he returns later and learns that his son had disgraced him by (unintentionally) betraying a fellow martial artist, he is so overwhelmed by fury that he kills his son.
- Meng Jianxiong (孟健雄) and An Jiangang (安健剛) are Zhou Zhongying's apprentices.
- Song Shanpeng (宋善朋) is Zhou Zhongying's housekeeper.

=== Others ===
- Li Yuanzhi (李沅芷) is Li Kexiu's daughter and Lu Feiqing's apprentice. She develops romantic feelings for Yu Yutong but he often gives her the cold shoulder because he has a crush on Luo Bing. Towards the end of the novel, Yu Yutong finally accepts her love and marries her.
- Yuan Shixiao (袁士宵), nicknamed "Eccentric Hero of the Heavenly Pool" (天池怪俠), is an eccentric martial artist living on Mount Heaven. He teaches Chen Jialuo his famous skill "Hundred Flowers Fist" (百花拳). He has a crush on Guan Mingmei and has never given up on her even after she married Chen Zhengde. He often bickers and argues with her husband.
- The "Twin Eagles of Mount Heaven" (天山雙鷹) are a couple living on Mount Heaven. They come to Hangzhou and attempt to assassinate the Qianlong Emperor. They are Chen Zhengde (陳正德), nicknamed "Bald Vulture" (禿鷲); and Guan Mingmei (關明梅), nicknamed "Snow Condor" (雪鵰). Guan Mingmei is also Huoqingtong's martial arts master.
- Muzhuolun (木卓倫) is a Uyghur tribal chief and the father of Huoqingtong and Kasili.
- Huo'ayi (霍阿伊) is Muzhuolun's son and the brother of Huoqingtong and Kasili.

== "Six Devils of Guandong" ==
The "Six Devils of Guandong" (關東六魔) are a group of six martial artists from Guandong (Manchuria) who are hired by Bai Zhen to assist him in executing the Qianlong Emperor's order to eliminate the Red Flower Society.

- Teng Yilei (滕一雷) is the most fearsome of the six. He is determined to slay any enemy at the expense of his life.
- Gu Jinbiao (顧金標) is a former bandit. His movements cannot be traced and he appears unpredictably.
- Jiao Wenqi (焦文期) is killed by Lu Feiqing. His fellows mistakenly think that the Red Flower Society is responsible for his death and start seeking vengeance on the society.
- Hahetai (哈合台) is a former shepherd from Mongolia.
- Yan Shizhang (閻世章) is killed by Huoqingtong.
- Yan Shikui (閻世魁) is Yan Shizhang's younger brother. He is killed by Huoqingtong when the Uyghur tribesmen and the Red Flower Society team up to attack the convoy and seize back the stolen Quran.

== Other characters ==
- Chen Shiguan (陳世倌), who is mentioned by name only, was an official from Haining who served as Minister of Rites and Grand Secretary of the Wenyuan Library. He was Chen Jialuo's father and the Qianlong Emperor's biological father.
- Xu Chaosheng (徐潮生), who is mentioned by name only, was Chen Shiguan's wife. She was Chen Jialuo's mother and the Qianlong Emperor's biological mother. Although she loved Yu Wanting, she had been forced to marry Chen Shiguan. She entrusted Chen Jialuo to the care of Yu Wanting, who became the boy's godfather.
- Luo Yuantong (駱元通), nicknamed "Holy Saber" (神刀), was Luo Bing's father and a highly-skilled swordsman known for robbing the rich to help the poor. He is only mentioned by name.
- Bei Renlong (貝人龍) is a martial artist nicknamed "Jade Judge" (玉判官) who is killed along with Luo Xin and Jiao Wenqi by Lu Feiqing.
- Luo Xin (羅信) is a martial artist nicknamed "Iron Armed Arhat" (鐵臂羅漢) who is killed along with Ben Renlong and Jiao Wenqi by Lu Feiqing.
- Wang Weiyang (王維揚), nicknamed "My Might Trembles Heshuo" (威震河朔), is the leader of the Zhenyuan Security Service (鎮遠鏢局) based in Beijing. ("Heshuo" refers to an area north of the Yellow River that includes parts of modern Shanxi, Hebei and Shandong.)
- Tong Zhaohe (童兆和) is a member of the Zhenyuan Security Service who accompanies the soldiers to arrest Wen Tailai. He also burns down Iron Courage Manor and kidnaps Zhou Qi's mother. He is eventually killed by Xu Tianhong and Zhou Qi.
- Han Wenchong (韓文沖) is a martial artist who owns a swift steed. The horse is stolen by Luo Bing when he stops to take a break.
- Sixth Master Tang (唐六爺) is a martial artist nicknamed "Candy with Frosted Arsenic" (糖裡砒霜). He is killed by Zhou Qi.
- Yuruyi (玉如意) is a courtesan from Hangzhou who entertains the Qianlong Emperor during his meeting with Chen Jialuo. She seduces the emperor and lures him into a trap, where he is captured by the Red Flower Society and held hostage in the Liuhe Pagoda.
- Effendi (阿凡提), based on Nasreddin, is an eccentric bearded old man who rides a donkey. He is highly-skilled in martial arts and qinggong.
- "Four Tigers of Hulun" (忽倫四虎)

== See also ==
- List of organisations in wuxia fiction
