= Corey Yuen =

Hong Kong director and action choreographer (1951–2022)

- 元奎
- Born: 殷港民; 15 February 1951; British Hong Kong
- Died: 2 March 2022 (aged 71); United States
- Other names: Corey Yuen; Yuen Kwai
- Occupations: Film director, film producer, action choreographer
- Years active: 1971–2022
- Relatives: Freddie Wong (nephew); Jimmy Wong (nephew)

Chinese name
- Chinese: 元奎
Transcriptions
Standard Mandarin
- Hanyu Pinyin: Yuán Kuí

Corey Yuen Kwai (Chinese: 元奎; Cantonese Yale: Yuen4 Kwai1; 15 February 1951 – 2 March 2022) was a Hong Kong film director, film producer, action choreographer, and actor. Yuen attended the China Drama Academy and was one of the Seven Little Fortunes. In Hong Kong, he worked on several films such as Bruce Lee's Fist of Fury (1972), Hwang Jang-lee's Snuff Bottle Connection, Secret Rivals 2, The Invincible Armour (all 1977), Dance of the Drunk Mantis (1979), Ninja in the Dragon's Den (1982), Millionaire's Express (1986), and Jet Li's Fong Sai-yuk II (1993), The New Legend of Shaolin (1994), High Risk, and My Father Is a Hero (both 1995).

Yuen gained fame in American cinema beginning with his work as an action director on the 1998 film Lethal Weapon 4, followed by the 2000 blockbuster X-Men and six of Jet Li's English-language works: Romeo Must Die (2000), Kiss of the Dragon, The One (both 2001), Cradle 2 the Grave (2003), War (2007), and The Expendables (2010). He also served as director and fight choreographer on Jason Statham's 2002 action film The Transporter, and served as second-unit director and fight choreographer on its two sequels.

== Life and career ==
Born on 15 February 1951 in British Hong Kong, his parents signed a 10-year contract for him to attend the China Drama Academy when he was 9 years old because they could not afford to raise him. Given the name Yuen Kwai, he became known as one of the Seven Little Fortunes, seven child actors and acrobats who performed together and who also included Jackie Chan, Sammo Hung, Yuen Biao, and Yuen Wah. They spent those days training in a harshly disciplined style under the watch of Master Yu Jim-yuen.

=== Acting ===
In the 1970s, Yuen appeared in three Hwang Jang-lee films: Secret Rivals 2 (1977) as Silver Fox's henchman; Invincible Armor (1977) as Assassin; and film Dance of the Drunk Mantis (1979) as Rubber Legs' student.

In the 1980s, Yuen played Devil Disciple Leader in the 1983 film Zu Warriors from the Magic Mountain, alongside Sammo Hung, Yuen Biao and Mang Hoi. Yuen played SWAT Team Member in 1985 film Heart of the Dragon, alongside Sammo Hung and Jackie Chan. Yuen played Bad Egg in 1986 film Righting Wrongs (who also directed), along with Yuen Biao, Melvin Wong, Cynthia Rothrock, Peter Cunningham and Louis Fan. Yuen played Judy Wu in 1987 film Eastern Condors along with Sammo Hung, Joyce Godenzi, Billy Chow Bei-lei, Yuen Biao, Max Mok, Yuen Woo-ping and Melvin Wong Kam-san.

In the 1990s, Yuen played Man in the Boat in the 1990 film She Shoots Straight, (who also directed) along with Joyce Godenzi, Sammo Hung and Yuen Wah. Yuen played Li Kwon-bon in 1993 film Fong Sai-yuk II (who also directed) alongside Jet Li. Yuen played Uncle Po in 1997 film Hero (who also directed) alongside Yuen Biao and Takeshi Kaneshiro.

In the 2010s, Yuen played Cao Cao's General in the 2010 film Just Another Pandora's Box alongside Ronald Cheng, Yuen Biao, Tin Kai-Man, Louis Fan Siu-wong and Wu Jing.

=== Filmmaking and choreography films ===
In July 1981, Yuen made his Hong Kong directorial debut in 1982 film Ninja in the Dragon's Den, along with Hiroyuki Sanada, Conan Lee and Hwang Jang-lee. In June 1985, Yuen made his American directorial debut in 1986 film No Retreat, No Surrender, which marked the film debut of Belgium martial artist actor Jean-Claude Van Damme. He has worked with most of Hong Kong's top stars at one time or another, and began Michelle Yeoh and Cynthia Rothrock's career in 1985 with Yes, Madam. He directed in 1990 film All for the Winner alongside Stephen Chow, followed by its 1991 sequel Top Bet alongside Anita Mui. He has also directed Jackie Chan with Sammo Hung in 1988 film Dragons Forever, and directed Anita Mui Yim-fong, Andy Lau and Aaron Kwok in Saviour of the Soul.

In 1993, he began an alliance and good friendship with actor Jet Li. He directed several of Li's films, beginning with Fong Sai-yuk and Fong Sai-yuk II, and continuing through The Bodyguard from Beijing and My Father Is a Hero. He also choreographed two of Jet Li's films, namely The New Legend of Shaolin and High Risk.

In the 2000s, Yuen directed the 2006 film DOA: Dead or Alive, based on the Dead or Alive fighting game series. The film stars Holly Valance, Jaime Pressly, Devon Aoki, Sarah Carter and the former WCW, TNA and WWE wrestler Kevin Nash.

=== Later and American works ===
Once Li gained stardom in American cinemas beginning with 1998 film Lethal Weapon 4, Yuen's action direction also received fame in the West. He worked in the 2000 blockbuster X-Men as an action director, and he would also handle the martial arts and action sequences in 6 of Li's other Hollywood films: Romeo Must Die, Kiss of the Dragon, The One, Cradle 2 the Grave, War, and The Expendables.

He also directed So Close, released in 2002. That same year he was the fight choreographer and second unit director for The Transporter, having initially been hired as the main director, returning for its 2005 sequel Transporter 2. He held the same positions on both films, however in the United States release he is credited as the first film's director due to being a more marketable name than first time filmmaker Louis Leterrier.

== Death ==
Yuen died from heart failure on 2 March 2022. At the time, news of his death was kept private at his family's request. 2 years later in 2024, Jackie Chan published a post on Weibo paying tribute to late members of the Seven Little Fortunes, naming Yuen as one of the deceased. Tin Kai-man confirmed that Yuen had died, and explained the news had been kept secret.

== Filmography ==
=== Films ===
Partial filmography as action choreographer.

- Deaf and Mute Heroine (1971)
- Fist of Fury (1972)
- The Yellow Killer (1972)
- Tough Guy (1972)
- Intimate Confessions of a Chinese Courtesan (1972)
- The Brutal Boxer (1972)
- The 14 Amazons (1972) (cameo)
- The Rats (1973)
- The Money Tree (1973)
- Death Blow (1973)
- Chinese Hercules (1973)
- The Black Belt (1973)
- Wits to Wits (1974)
- The Tournament (1974)
- The Shadow Boxer (1974)
- Naughty! Naughty! (1974)
- The Evil Snake Girl (1974)
- Valiant Ones (1975)
- The Man from Hong Kong (1975)
- The Himalayan (1976)
- Bruce Lee and I (1976)
- To Kill a Jaguar (1977)
- Snuff Bottle Connection (1977)
- Six Directions of Boxing (1977)
- Secret Rivals 2 (1977)
- Pursuit of Vengeance (1977)
- The Mighty Peking Man (1977)
- Last Strike (1977)
- The Invincible Armour (1977)
- Instant Kung Fu Man (1977)
- Heroes of Shaolin (1977)
- The Fatal Flying Guillotines (1977)
- Death Duel (1977)
- Broken Oath (1977)
- The Vengeful Beauty (1978)
- Flying Guillotine 2 (1978)
- Massacre Survivor (1978)
- Dance of the Drunk Mantis (1979)
- We’re Going to Eat You (1980)
- Ring of Death (1980)
- The Buddha Assassinator (1980)
- Perils of the Sentimental Swordsman (1982)
- Zu Warriors from the Magic Mountain (1983)
- Heart of Dragon (1985)
- Righting Wrongs (a.k.a. Above the Law) (1986)
- Millionaire's Express (1986)
- Eastern Condors (1987)
- Spooky, Spooky (1988)
- In the Blood (1988)
- Couples, Couples, Couples (1988)
- She Shoots Straight (1990)
- The Raid (1990)
- The Nocturnal Demon (1990)
- Mortuary Blues (1990)
- All for the Winner (1990)
- Top Bet (1991)
- Saviour of the Soul (1991)
- Red Shield (1991)
- Fist of Fury 1991 (1991)
- Bury Me High (1991)
- Saviour of the Soul 2 (1992)
- A Kid from Tibet (1992)
- Fist of Fury 1991 II (1992)
- Women on the Run (1993)
- Kick Boxer (1993)
- Fong Sai-yuk II (a.k.a. The Legend of Fong Sai Yuk II and The Legend 2) (1993)
- The New Legend of Shaolin (a.k.a. Legend of the Red Dragon) (1994) (action director)
- High Risk (a.k.a. Meltdown) (1995)
- Hero (a.k.a. Ma Wing Jing) (1997)
- Just Another Pandora's Box (2010)
- A Chinese Odyssey Part Three (2016)

=== Director ===
Year	English title		Notes
Year	International	Philippines	Notes
1982	Ninja in the Dragon's Den		
1985	Yes, Madam	The Super Cops	a.k.a. Police Assassins and In the Line of Duty 2
1986	No Retreat, No Surrender		
1986	Righting Wrongs	Fight to Win II	a.k.a. Above the Law
1987	No Retreat, No Surrender 2	Raging Thunder	a.k.a. No Retreat, No Surrender II: Raging Thunder
1988	In the Blood		
1988	Dragons Forever	Super Dragon	
1990	She Shoots Straight		
1990	All for the Winner		
1991	Top Bet		
1991	Saviour of the Soul	The Good and the Bad	
1992	Ghost Punting		
1992	Saviour of the Soul II		
1992	Fist of Fury 1991 II		
1993	Women on the Run		
1993	Fong Sai-yuk	The Prodigal Fighter	a.k.a. The Legend of Fong Sai Yuk and The Legend
1993	Fong Sai-yuk II	Once Upon a Time in China-6	a.k.a. The Legend of Fong Sai Yuk II and The Legend 2
1994	The Bodyguard from Beijing		a.k.a. The Defender
1995	My Father Is a Hero		a.k.a. The Enforcer and Jet Li's The Enforcer
1997	Mah-jong Dragon		
1997	Hero		
1997	97 Legendary La Rose Noire		
1998	Enter the Eagles		
2001	The Avenging Fist		
2002	So Close		
2002	The Transporter		Directed with Louis Leterrier
2004	The Twins Effect II	Blade of the Rose	
2006	DOA: Dead or Alive		
2011	Treasure Inn		Directed with Wong Jing
