= Dr. Wai in "The Scripture with No Words" =

1996 Hong Kong film by Ching Siu-tung

Dr. Wai in "The Scripture With No Words"
- Film poster
- Directed by: Ching Siu-tung
- Written by: Lam Wai-lun; Sandy Shaw Lai-king
- Produced by: Tsai Mu-ho
- Starring: Jet Li; Rosamund Kwan; Charlie Yeung; Takeshi Kaneshiro
- Cinematography: Tom Lau
- Edited by: Angie Lam; Marco Mak
- Music by: Frankie Chan
- Production companies: Win's Entertainment; Eastern Production
- Distributed by: Win's Entertainment
- Release date: 14 March 1996
- Running time: 90 minutes (Hong Kong); 87 minutes (International)
- Country: Hong Kong
- Language: Cantonese
- Box office: HK$13,847,368

Dr. Wai in "The Scripture with No Words" (Chinese: 冒險王; Cantonese Yale: Mo him wong; lit. 'Adventure King'; released in the Philippines as Adventurer from China) is a 1996 Hong Kong action film directed by Ching Siu-tung and starring Jet Li.

It won the Golden Horse Award for Best Visual Effects and was nominated at the 16th Hong Kong Film Awards for Best Action Choreography.

During the production, a fire destroyed HK$10 million worth of sets, resulting in severe budget problems. In an attempt to limit the damage, the script was revised and many modern plots were added, resulting the film to have two different endings.

== Plot ==
There is an original Hong Kong release version and an international exported release version. The story, setting, and editing are greatly different. In the Hong Kong version, the story unfolds in the form of metafiction, in which a modern writer writes a novel with the "Adventure King" as the main character, while in the exported version, the story of the Adventure King is a story that his son heard from his father. In the Hong Kong version, the characters from the modern part have appeared in the novel "Adventure King" part under different roles.

=== Hong Kong version ===
This version uses portions of the original footage married to an entirely new plot involving a new character. Chow Si-kit (周時杰), a pulp serial author who was divorced by his wife Monica resulting in a serious case of writer's block, got drunk up after a divorce meeting with his wife. Temporarily escapes reality by living vicariously through one of his lead characters, Dr. Wai, in a story about a quest for a mythical scripture.

=== International Exported version ===
Legend had it that the high priest Tang successfully reached the world of eternity by obtaining the "Scripture With No Words", which possessed mystical powers to change the world. Over the years various people claimed they found it, but then lost it.

Dr. Wai, a prominent archaeologist and adventurer, is asked by the Chinese government to seek out the treasures box and scripture. Wai sneaks into the Japanese Consulate in search of information about the treasure, and meets a Japanese woman, Yu Fung (Hong Kong version: Kamiko). He is fascinated by the beautiful woman, but her true identity is a Japanese general aiming for a treasure. Wai traced the carved box to Justice News Daily and found out the editor was disguising his true identity. This edit plays as a straightforward Indiana Jones-style adventure, eliminating the present-day framing scenario with Jet Li as a novelist; instead the remaining time is padded with exclusive period sequences.

== Cast ==
- Jet Li as Chow Si-kit/Dr. Wai, the "Adventure King"
- Rosamund Kwan as Monica Kwan/Yu Fung (Kamiko)
- Charlie Yeung as Yvonne/Yan-yan/Pansy
- Takeshi Kaneshiro as Shing
- Billy Chow as Chan/Japanese Embassy Guard
- Collin Chou as Hung-hung Sing-sing
- Johnny Kong as Mr. Lo
- Law Kar-ying as Headmaster

== Release ==
The Scripture with No Words was released in Hong Kong on 14 March 1996. In the Philippines, the film was released by Solar Films as Adventurer from China on 24 July 1996.

On 20 November 2023, Eureka released the Blu-ray collection which includes Dr. Wai in both Hong Kong Version and International Version.

== See also ==
- Hong Kong action cinema
