= China Drama Academy =

Opera school in Hong Kong

The China Drama Academy (Chinese: 中國戲劇學院) was a Peking opera school in Kowloon, Hong Kong, known for being the childhood home of actors as Jackie Chan (Yuen Lo), Sammo Hung (Yuen Lung), Yuen Biao, Yuen Wah, Yuen Qiu and Corey Yuen (Yuen Kwai). Famed filmmaker Yuen Woo-ping also attended the school for one year as a day student.

It was run from a small theatre in the Lai Chi Kok Amusement Park by Master Yu Jim Yuen, a northern (北拳) kung fu practitioner and a very stern teacher. Children were usually enrolled for a period of 10 years, whilst Yu taught them the acrobatic and acting skills that would later introduce many of them into the world of Chinese theatre and movies.

Whilst attending the Peking opera school under the tutelage of Yu Jim Yuen, the students all adopted their sifu's given name "Yuen" as their family name.

== Life at the school ==
Practice at the Peking Opera School was very strict. The students signed contracts that would allow the instructors to punish them up until death. Training would take place up to 18 hours a day and included stretching, weapons training, acrobatics, martial arts and acting. In an interview in 2008, Jackie Chan described the experience:

It was really arduous, we hardly had enough to eat, enough clothes to keep warm, training was extremely tiring, and Master could cane us anytime!

Hung retorted:

...at that time, majority of the people in Hong Kong were poor. It was equally grueling whichever profession you were in. We were considered fortunate. Our Master was an exceptional person, and he adopted Jackie Chan as his son, and doted on him the most. [..] Our Master took in many disciples, but he didn't take a single cent from us, and even slept on the floor together with us.

In Chan's biography, he elaborates on how students would be made to adopt the horse stance and other balancing poses, for long periods. If one student fell, they would be beaten and all students would be made to restart the exercise.

Whilst there, Chan earned the nickname "Double Boy" from the other students, because he would often have to endure twice the training as the other students, but had twice the spirit. According to his book I Am Jackie Chan, one of the reasons Chan excelled was because he had been "adopted" by Yu at the request of his parents. This meant any failure would have been a particular embarrassment, so he was made to practice for longer and often when others made mistakes, Chan was punished twice as hard as the perpetrator.

== The Seven Little Fortunes ==
Seven Little Fortunes
- Chinese: 七小福
Transcriptions
Standard Mandarin
- Hanyu Pinyin: qī xiǎo fú
- Wade–Giles: ch'i hsiao fu
- IPA: [tɕʰí ɕjàʊ fǔ]
Yue: Cantonese
- Yale Romanization: chāt siú fūk
- Jyutping: cat1 siu2 fuk1
- IPA: [tsʰɐ́t.sīːu.fʊ̂k]

The Seven Little Fortunes (Chinese: 七小福; pinyin: qī xiǎo fú), sometimes known as The Lucky Seven, were a performance troupe consisting of the China Drama Academy's most capable students. Aged as young as seven or eight years old, they travelled and showed their acrobatic and acting skills to domestic and Western audiences in theatres and venues such as Lai Chi Kok Amusement Park (a.k.a. Lai-yuen Amusement Park). The school also sent these students to work for movie studios as extras.

Though there were more than seven pupils in the troupe at any one time (some estimates say 14), only seven would appear in each performance. Jackie Chan was one of the Seven Little Fortunes and, when asked about his most famous pupil, Master Yu Jim Yuen said that Jackie was "not one of the best, but the naughtiest, yes."

Known members include Jackie Chan (Yuen Lo), Sammo Hung (Yuen Lung), Yuen Biao, Yuen Wah, Corey Yuen (Yuen Kwai), Yuen Qiu, Yuen Tak, Yuen Tai, and Yuen Mo. Painted Faces (1988) is a biographical film about The Seven Little Fortunes during their youth at the Peking Opera School.
