= Yuen Biao =

Hong Kong actor, martial artist, and action choreographer (born 1957)

- 元彪
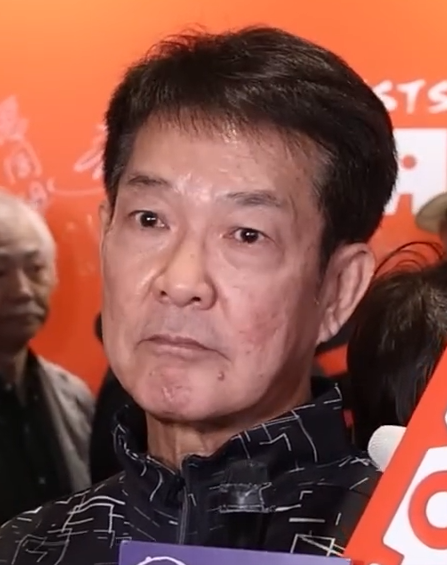
- Yuen in March 2024
- Born: Ha Lingchun (夏令震、元庆、元典); 26 July 1957 (age 69); British Hong Kong
- Other names: Bill Yuen; Jimmy Yuen
- Occupations: Actor; producer; stuntman; martial artist; action choreographer
- Years active: 1962–present
- Spouse: Didi Pang (m. 1984)
- Children: Ha Yi Pui (daughter); Ha Ming Chak (son)
- Awards: Hong Kong Film Awards – Best Action Choreography; 1983 The Prodigal Son; 1984 Winners and Sinners

Chinese name
- Traditional Chinese: 元彪
- Simplified Chinese: 元彪
Transcriptions
Standard Mandarin
- Hanyu Pinyin: Yuán Biāo
Yue: Cantonese
- Jyutping: Jyun4 Biu1

Ha Lingchun
- Traditional Chinese: 夏令震
- Simplified Chinese: 夏令震
Transcriptions
Standard Mandarin
- Hanyu Pinyin: Xià Lìngzhèn
Yue: Cantonese
- Jyutping: Haa6 Ling6zan3

Ha Lingchun (born 26 July 1957), known professionally as Yuen Biao, is a Hong Kong actor, martial artist and stuntman. He specialises in acrobatics and Chinese martial arts and has also worked on over 80 films as actor, stuntman and action choreographer. He was one of the Seven Little Fortunes from the China Drama Academy at the Peking Opera School along with his "brothers" Sammo Hung and Jackie Chan. Throughout the 1980s, he was part of the "Three Dragons" along with Chan and Hung; the three starred in six Hong Kong films together. Yuen Biao has appeared in over 130 films. He has played roles in eight television series for the Hong Kong channel TVB.

== Early life ==
Born Ha Lingchun (Chinese: 夏令震) in Nanjing, China on the 26th July 1957, he was the fifth child in a family of eight children. He and his family moved to Hong Kong when he was five years old. At the age of six he was enrolled at the Peking Opera School The China Drama Academy. He was given the stage name Yuen Biao (Little Tiger) and trained alongside schoolmates Jackie Chan, Sammo Hung, Corey Yuen, Yuen Wah and several others, under master Yu Jim-yuen, who would later become famous in Hong Kong cinema. He quickly showed a talent for acrobatics. According to Jackie Chan's autobiography, when Yuen was asked by his master to do a backflip on his first day of training, Yuen did a proper backflip on his very first try. He remained at the school until the age of 16. When he left, Yuen followed his classmate Sammo Hung into a career in the Hong Kong film industry.

== Film career ==
=== Early 1970s ===
In the early 1970s, Yuen began work as a stuntman and extra. After working on Fist of Fury and Way of the Dragon. He was also one of the "fake" Bruce Lees in Game of Death (1978), performing the acrobatics and stunts that the Bruce Lee "body double" (taekwondo expert Kim Tai-chung) was unable to perform. Yuen continued working as a stuntman, doubling for actors in Hong Kong action films and taking on supporting actor roles.

During his early acting period, he adopted the anglicised name Bill Yuen for use on the Hong Kong films that were released internationally. However, recognising the growing success of Jackie Chan, Golden Harvest were keen to give him a similar name, and on some international film prints, he was credited as Jimmy Yuen. Both anglicised names were later dropped.

=== Late 1970s and 1980s ===
In the late 1970s and early 1980s, thanks to his good friends and former classmates, Sammo Hung and Jackie Chan, he began working more frequently as an actor. After his co-starring role in The Dragon, the Odds (1977) and his full lead role debut in Knockabout (1979), he starred in several films in the early 1980s, notably The Prodigal Son (1981) (directed by Sammo Hung), Dreadnaught (1981) (directed by Yuen Woo-ping) and Zu Warriors from the Magic Mountain (1983) directed by Tsui Hark. He also co-starred alongside his Peking Opera "brothers", Chan and Hung, in Project A (1983), Wheels on Meals (1984) and Dragons Forever (1988), and also appeared in smaller roles in films such as Hung's original Lucky Stars trilogy. He co-starred with Sammo in films such as Eastern Condors (1987) and Millionaires Express (1988). He played the lead with Cynthia Rothrock in Righting Wrongs (1986) and alongside Maggie Cheung in The Iceman Cometh (1989).

=== 1990s ===
Yuen's acting roles waned somewhat in the early 1990s, although he notably played a supporting role alongside Jet Li in Once Upon a Time in China (1991). Yuen did not appear in the sequel as he was replaced by Max Mok. In the late 1990s, films such as Hero (1997) co-starring Takeshi Kaneshiro and A Man Called Hero (1999) co-starring Ekin Cheng saw Yuen return to the big screen. During this time he began to concentrate more on television work and took lead roles in the series Righteous Guards and The Legend of a Chinese Hero in 1998.

=== 2000s ===
In 2000, Yuen went to the United States to work with Jackie Chan as the action choreographer on Shanghai Noon. In 2001, he co-starred alongside Hung in The Avenging Fist. Yuen also starred in a more comedic role in the 2002 Japan HK film No Problem 2.

In 2005, Yuen starred in a TVB series called Real Kung Fu with Yuen Wah, Maggie Siu, Leung Kar Yan, Jack Wu and one of Sammo Hung's real life sons, Timmy Hung.

In 2006, Yuen played Inspector Steve Mok in Robin B Hood along with his long-time friend Jackie Chan.

In 2007 he finished filming the Wing Chun TV series (a remake of the 1994 series that had preceded the film Wing Chun) alongside Nicholas Tse, Sammo Hung and another of Hung's sons, Sammy Hung. Biao plays an elder version of the character Leung Jan, the role he played 25 years earlier in The Prodigal Son, and father to Tse's character. The series has since been re-edited for release as a film, entitled Shuang Long Ji (aka Legend of Twins Dragon). However, the film's release has been delayed as it has been banned in mainland China for containing too much violence.

Yuen appeared as a guest judge on the China Beijing TV Station reality television series The Disciple, which aired in mainland China, and was produced by and featured Jackie Chan. The aim of the program was to find a new star, skilled in acting and martial arts, to become Chan's "successor", the champion being awarded the lead role in a film. It concluded on June 7, 2008, with the series winner being announced in Beijing.

Yuen also starred alongside Bryan Leung and Ji Chunhua in Legend of Shaolin Kung-fu II: Thirteen Cudgel Monks, a series directed by Yuen Bun. It was edited down and released as Kung Fu Master in the United States.

== Directing and producing ==
Though mainly known as an actor, Yuen also directed the film A Kid from Tibet (1991).

Yuen set up his own film production company, Yuen Biao Films Limited, which produced his films A Kid from Tibet and Kick Boxer, also known as Once Upon a Chinese Hero (1993).

== Personal life ==
In 1984, Yuen married Didi Pang Sau Ha. They have two children: daughter Yi-Bui, born in 1986, and son Ming-Tsak, born in 1988.

Yuen has a second home in Canada, where he enjoys golf.
