= Yuen Wah =

Hong Kong actor, action choreographer, stuntman and martial artist

- 元華
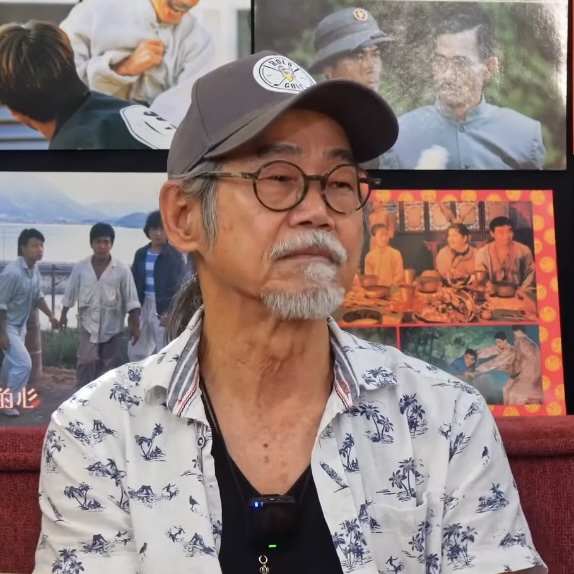
- Yuen in 2024
- Born: Yung Kai-chi (容繼志); 2 September 1952 (age 73); British Hong Kong
- Other names: Yung Chi; Sam Yuen
- Occupations: Actor; martial artist; stuntman; action choreographer
- Years active: 1962–present
- Children: 2
- Awards: Hong Kong Film Awards – Best Supporting Actor; 2005 Kung Fu Hustle Golden Bauhinia Awards – Best Supporting Actor; 2005 Kung Fu Hustle

Chinese name
- Traditional Chinese: 元華
- Simplified Chinese: 元华
Transcriptions
Standard Mandarin
- Hanyu Pinyin: Yuán Huá
Yue: Cantonese
- Jyutping: Jyun^{4} Waa^{4}

Alternative Chinese name
- Traditional Chinese: 容繼志
- Simplified Chinese: 容继志
Transcriptions
Standard Mandarin
- Hanyu Pinyin: Róng Jì Zhì
Yue: Cantonese
- Jyutping: Jung^{4} Gai^{3} Zi^{3}

Yuen Wah (Chinese: 元華, born Yung Kai-chi [容繼志]; 2 September 1952) is a Hong Kong actor, martial artist, stuntman, and action choreographer. A member of the Seven Little Fortunes, he has appeared in over 200 films and television series since his debut in 1962. He won the Hong Kong Film Award for Best Action Choreography for The Iceman Cometh (1989), and was nominated for Best Supporting Actor for his performance in Kung Fu Hustle (2004).

== Early life and education ==
Born Yung Kai-chi (容繼志) on 2 September 1950 in Hong Kong, Kai attended the China Drama Academy, a Peking opera school in Hong Kong in the late 1950s and 1960s. He was instructed by Master Yu Jim Yuen and became a member of the Seven Little Fortunes along with fellow students including Jackie Chan, Sammo Hung, Yuen Biao, Yuen Qiu and Corey Yuen. Like the other students, he took his sifu's given name – "Yuen". In his biography, Jackie Chan stated that Yuen Wah's martial arts ability was well respected among his fellow students. After leaving the opera school, many of the students entered the Hong Kong film industry. Yuen Wah was given an anglicised stagename, Sam Yuen, but like Yuen Biao (Bill Yuen / Jimmy Yuen), the name was not used. Rather than reverting to their birth names, both retained their opera school names, as did several other former students.

== Career ==
Known for his agility and acrobatic skills, Yuen Wah began his film career working as Bruce Lee's stunt double in the films Fist of Fury (1972) and Enter the Dragon (1973). He also made his acting debut in Fist of Fury, as a Japanese man who asks Bruce Lee's character to crawl like a dog and is soundly beaten for it. He began to receive a number of roles in Shaw Brothers films.

Yuen's versatility, his lean, wiry frame and later, his distinctive moustache often saw him cast as the villain in most films. During the 1980s, he worked on several films with former classmates Jackie Chan, Sammo Hung and Yuen Biao, both in an action director / stunt co-ordinator capacity, and in acting roles as villainous characters. The films included Mr. Vampire (1985), My Lucky Stars (1985), Millionaire's Express (1986), Eastern Condors (1986), and Dragons Forever (1988).

During the 1990s, whilst still appearing in a number of films, Yuen began to focus on television series roles for TVB. In 1996, he starred as a Taoist priest fighting jiangshi vampires in the series The Night Journey. His comical and endearingly scrooge-like image earned him popularity on the Hong Kong television circuit. Since then, he has appeared in over 20 different television series.

In 2004, Yuen was cast as the Landlord in Stephen Chow's comedy film Kung Fu Hustle. During the 2005 Hong Kong Film Awards, his colleagues took the opportunity to award him with the award for Best Supporting Actor.

Yuen made his debut in an English language film in Aiming High in 1998. He appeared in another English language production, the 2008 Baz Luhrmann period film Australia, alongside Nicole Kidman and Hugh Jackman. He played a supporting role in the 2021 Marvel Cinematic Universe film Shang-Chi and the Legend of the Ten Rings.

Yuen Wah has starred in more than 60 films and worked on over 160. In the early 1970s, Yuen worked as a stuntman and extra, later progressing to stunt coordinator / action director roles, as well as full-fledged acting parts.

During the 1980s he made a number of appearances, primarily as villainous characters in the films of his former-China Drama Academy friends, Sammo Hung, Jackie Chan and Yuen Biao.

From the mid-1990s, Yuen embarked on a television career in Hong Kong. To date, he has appeared in 23 different series for broadcaster TVB. He also appeared in a show for Taiwanese channel CTS – a remake of the film A Chinese Ghost Story titled Eternity: A Chinese Ghost Story.

Yuen is credited as an actor in over 180 films and as a martial arts director for over 40 films.
