= List of Hong Kong films of 2011 =

This article lists feature-length Hong Kong films released in 2011.

== Box office ==
The highest-grossing Hong Kong films released in 2011 by domestic box office gross revenue, are as follows:

Highest-grossing films released in 2011
Rank	Title	Domestic gross
1	3D Sex and Zen: Extreme Ecstasy	HK$41,078,280
2	I Love Hong Kong	HK$26,688,278
3	Overheard 2	HK$24,010,055
4	Shaolin	HK$20,510,569
5	All's Well, Ends Well 2011	HK$20,321,315
6	Don't Go Breaking My Heart	HK$12,302,950
7	Let the Bullets Fly	HK$12,211,549
8	Life Without Principle	HK$8,437,059
9	Mr. & Mrs. Incredible	HK$8,220,252
10	The Lost Bladesman	HK$8,059,285

== Releases ==
Title	Director	Cast	Genre	Notes
1911	Jackie Chan, Zhang Li	Jackie Chan, Jaycee Chan, Li Bingbing, Winston Chao, Joan Chen	Historical action drama	In theaters 29 September 2011
3D Sex and Zen: Extreme Ecstasy	Christopher Suen	Hayama Go, Saori Hara, Lan Yan, Vonnie Lui, Yukiko Suo	Erotic / drama	In theaters 14 April 2011
The 33D Invader	Cash Chin	Wu Qingqing, Akiho Yoshizawa, Taka Kato, Sammuel Leung, Law Ka-ying	Erotic / fantasy	In theaters 6 October 2011
All's Well, Ends Well 2011	Chan Hing-ka; Janet Chun	Donnie Yen, Carina Lau, Louis Koo, Lynn Hung, Raymond Wong, Yan Ni, Ronald Cheng, Angelababy, Chapman To, Cecilia Cheung, Margie Tsang, Irene Wang	Comedy	In theaters 2 February 2011
Beach Spike	Tony Tang	Chrissie Chau, Theresa Fu, Jessica C, Him Law, Jazz Lam, Lam Suet, Sharon Yeung, Lo Mang, Phoenix Valen, Candice Yu	Action / adventure	In theaters 7 July 2011
A Beautiful Life	Andrew Lau	Shu Qi, Liu Ye, Anthony Wong	Romance	In theaters 26 May 2011
Big Blue Lake	Jessey Tsang	Leila Tong, Lawrence Chou, Amy Chum, Joman Chiang	Drama	In theaters 17 November 2011; Entered into the 2011 Vancouver International Film Festival and Hong Kong Asian Film Festival
A Chinese Ghost Story	Wilson Yip	Louis Koo, Liu Yifei	Fantasy	In theaters 28 April 2011
Choy Lee Fut	Sam Wong; Tony Law	Sammo Hung, Yuen Wah, Kane Kosugi, Sammy Hung, Stephen Wong	Martial arts	In theaters 7 April 2011
Datong: The Great Society	Evans Chan	Liu Kai-chi, Lindzay Chan	Documentary / drama	Entered into the 2011 Hong Kong Asian Film Festival
Demon 2	Li Wei-ming	Liu Kai-chi, Elena Kong	Drama / crime	In theaters 22 September 2011
The Detective 2	Oxide Pang	Aaron Kwok, Liu Kai-chi, Patrick Tam, Cheung Siu-fai, Gong Beibi	Thriller	In theaters 12 May 2011
Don't Go Breaking My Heart	Johnnie To; Wai Ka-Fai	Louis Koo, Gao Yuanyuan, Daniel Wu, Lam Suet, Terence Yin, Selena Li, JJ Jia	Romance	In theaters 31 March 2011; Entered into the 2011 Hong Kong International Film Festival
East Meets West 2011	Jeffrey Lau; Susie Au	Eason Chan, Ekin Cheng, Karen Mok, Kenny Bee, Huang Yi, Jaycee Chan, William So, Stephy Tang, Tan Weiwei	Comedy / romance	In theaters 24 November 2011
Flying Swords of Dragon Gate	Tsui Hark	Jet Li, Zhou Xun, Chen Kun, Gwei Lun-mei	Martial arts	In theaters 22 December 2011
The Fortune Buddies	Chung Shu-kai	Eric Tsang, Louis Yuen, Wong Cho-lam, Johnson Lee, Fiona Sit, Maggie Cheung, Fala Chen	Comedy	In theaters 11 August 2011
Hi, Fidelity	Calvin Poon	Pat Ha, Michelle Ye, Carrie Ng, William Chan, George Lam, Chapman To, Lawrence Cheng, Candice Yu	Romance	In theaters 24 March 2011
Hong Kong Ghost Stories	Patrick Kong; Wong Jing	Him Law, Chrissie Chau, Jennifer Tse, Carol Yeung, Betrys Kong, Jun Leung, Timmy Hung, Jacqueline Chong, Charmaine Fong, Michelle Yeung	Horror	In theaters 27 October 2011
I Love Hong Kong	Eric Tsang; Chung Shu-kai	Eric Tsang, Tony Leung Ka-fai, Sandra Ng, Aarif Lee, Mag Lam, Fala Chen, Wayne Lai, Michael Tse, Moses Chan, Charmaine Sheh	Comedy / drama	In theaters 3 February 2011
Lan Kwai Fong	Wilson Chin	Shiga Lin, Chen Zhiming, Jason Chan, Xian Seli, Jun Kung, Miki Yeung, Jeana Ho	Romance / erotic	In theaters 15 September 2011
Let's Go!	Wong Ching-po	Juno Mak, Stephy Tang, Jimmy Wang, Gordon Lam, Pat Ha	Action / crime	In theaters 10 November 2011; Entered into the 2011 Hong Kong Asian Film Festival
Life Without Principle	Johnnie To	Lau Ching-wan, Richie Ren, Denise Ho, Myolie Wu	Crime / thriller	In theaters 20 October 2011
The Lost Bladesman	Alan Mak; Felix Chong	Donnie Yen, Jiang Wen, Alex Fong, Chin Siu-ho, Betty Sun, Andy On	Martial arts / action / biography / history	In theaters 28 April 2011
Love Actually... Sucks!	Scud	Osman Hung, Linda So, Christerpher Wee	Drama	In theaters 29 March 2012
Love in Space	Tony Chan; Wing Shya	Aaron Kwok, Eason Chan, Angelababy, Gwei Lun-mei, Rene Liu, Jing Boran	Comedy / romance	In theaters 8 September 2011
Love is the Only Answer	Patrick Kong	Charmaine Sheh, Alex Fong, Him Law, Anjaylia Chan, Jason Chan, Rose Chan, Kelly Fu, Harriet Yeung, Tyson Chak, Timmy Hung, King Kong, Jacqueline Chong, Charmaine Fong	Romance / drama	In theaters 28 July 2011
Magic to Win	Wilson Yip	Louis Koo, Raymond Wong, Wu Chun, Wu Jing, Tonny Jan, Yan Ni, Karena Ng	Fantasy	In theaters 1 December 2011
Men Suddenly in Love	Wong Jing	Eric Tsang, Chapman To, Jim Chim, Wong Jing, Tat Dik, Richard Ng, Maggie Cheung, Chrissie Chau, Carol Yeung, Monica Chan	Romance / comedy	In theaters 10 March 2011
Microsex Office	Jim Chim; Lee Kung-lok	Jim Chim, Jacqueline Chong, Koni Lui, Bonnie Wong, Michelle Yeung, Chak Hoi-tai	Comedy	In theaters 9 June 2011
Mr. and Mrs. Incredible	Vincent Kok	Louis Koo, Sandra Ng	Comedy	In theaters 3 February 2011
Mural	Gordon Chan	Deng Chao, Betty Sun, Yan Ni, Collin Chou, Eric Tsang	Fantasy	In theaters 13 October 2011
Orient Top Town	Gina See-Yuen Wong	Feng Kwai Lim, Wu Xie, Shi Jin,	Documentary	Screened in Competition at the Dhaka International Film Festival and the International Film Festival of Uruguay.
Overheard 2	Alan Mak; Felix Chong	Lau Ching Wan, Louis Koo, Daniel Wu, Michelle Ye, Huang Yi, Wilfred Lau	Crime / thriller	In theaters 18 August 2011
Punished	Law Wing-cheong	Anthony Wong, Richie Ren, Janice Man, Maggie Cheung, Candy Lo, Jun Kung, Lam Lei	Thriller	In theaters 5 May 2011
The Road Less Traveled	Derek Chiu	Louis Koo, Karen Mok, Huang Yi, Wayne Lai	Romance	In theaters 6 January 2011
Shaolin	Benny Chan	Andy Lau, Jackie Chan, Nicholas Tse, Fan Bingbing, Wu Jing	Martial arts / action	In theaters 27 January 2011
A Simple Life	Ann Hui	Andy Lau, Deanie Ip	Drama	In theaters 9 March 2012 selected as the Hong Kong entry for the 84th Academy Awards for Best Foreign Language Film in 2011.
Sleepwalker	Oxide Pang	Angelica Lee, Charlie Yeung, Huo Siyan	Horror	In theaters 3 November 2011
The Sorcerer and the White Snake	Ching Siu-tung	Jet Li, Huang Shengyi, Raymond Lam, Charlene Choi, Vivian Hsu, Jiang Wu, Miriam Yeung, Chapman To, Lam Suet, Law Kar-ying, Sonija Kwok, Wen Zhang	Martial arts / action / fantasy	In theaters 29 September 2011
Strawberry Cliff	Chris Chow	Eason Chan, Leslie-Anne Huff	Mystery	In theaters 1 December 2011
Summer Love	Wilson Chin	Alex Fong, Owodog, Terence Siufay, Elanne Kong, Carol Yeung, Zhang Xinyu, Liu Yuqi	Romance / comedy	In theaters 25 August 2011
Treasure Hunt	Wong Jing	Ronald Cheng, Cecilia Cheung, Lucas Tse, Ekin Cheng, Wong Jing	Comedy	In theaters 8 September 2011
Treasure Inn	Wong Jing	Nicholas Tse, Nick Cheung, Charlene Choi	Action / comedy	In theaters 23 June 2011
Turning Point 2	Herman Yau	Michael Tse, Francis Ng, Chapman To, Bosco Wong, Kara Hui, Kate Tsui, Janice Man	Action / crime	In theaters 29 December 2011
The Way We Were	Lau Kin-ping; Hui Shu-ning	Liu Kai-chi, Fiona Sit, Pakho Chau, Tats Lau, Sin Lap-man	Comedy / drama	In theaters 12 May 2011
White Vengeance	Daniel Lee	Leon Lai, Jordan Chan, Liu Yifei, Zhang Hanyu, Anthony Wong, Jia Qi, Feng Shaofeng, Wang Xueqi	War / historical	In theaters 8 December 2011
Wu Xia	Peter Chan	Donnie Yen, Takeshi Kaneshiro, Tang Wei, Jimmy Wang Yu, Kara Hui, Zheng Wei, Li Jiamin, Yin Zhusheng	Martial arts / action / Wuxia	In theaters 28 July 2011; Entered into the 2011 Cannes Film Festival
