= Eason Chan filmography =

Eason Chan is a Hong Kong singer and actor who has starred in multiple box-office hits. Chan started to act in films in 1997. He has since starred or co-starred in more than 40 films. He was nominated for Best Supporting Actor by the Golden Horse Film Awards in 2000 for his role in Lavender. In 2005, he was nominated for Best Actor by Golden Bauhinia Awards for his work in Crazy N' The City. In 2008, he was nominated for Best Supporting Actor in Taiwan's Golden Horse Awards for his work in Trivial Matters.

== Filmography ==
- 1997 – Ghost Story – Godmother of Mongkok (旺角大家姐)
- 1998 – Rumble Ages (烈火青春) – as 阿森
- 1998 – City of Glass (玻璃之城) – as秉正
- 2000 – Twelve Nights (十二夜) – as Alan
- 2000 – Jiang Hu: The Triad Zone (江湖告急) – as 葉偉信
- 2000 – Lavender (薰衣草) – as Chow Chow
- 2001 – Comic King (漫畫風雲) – as 武雲
- 2001 – Feel 100% II (百分百感覺II) – as Jerry
- 2001 – Cop Shop Babes (靚女差館) – as 生啤
- 2001 – Visible Secret (幽靈人間) – as Peter
- 2001 – Funeral March (常在我心) – as 小段
- 2002 – Tiramisu (戀愛行星) – as Buddy
- 2002 – Frugal Game (慳錢家族) – as 徐少俠
- 2002 – Visible Secret 2 (幽靈人間II鬼味人間) – as 郭積
- 2002 – If U Care (賤精先生) – as 張俊輝
- 2002 – Demi-Haunted (魂魄唔齊) – as 路初八
- 2002 – Golden Chicken (金雞) – as 小鋼炮
- 2003 – 1:99 (1:99電影行動)
- 2003 – Naked Ambition (豪情) – as 忠
- 2003 – Hidden Track (Cameo only) (尋找周杰倫) (客串)
- 2004 – Enter the Phoenix (大佬愛美麗) – as Sam
- 2004 – Love Battlefield (愛．作戰) – as 張家銳
- 2004 – Heat Team (重案黐孖Gun) – as 王啟聰
- 2005 – Crazy N' The City (神經俠侶) – as 陳俊傑
- 2007 – The Pye-Dog (野.良犬) – as 陳滿堆
- 2007 – Hooked on You (每當變幻時) – as 魚佬
- 2007 – Brothers (兄弟) – as 譚仲舜
- 2007 – Trivial Matters (破事兒) – as "做節"男友
- 2008 – Lost Indulgence (秘岸) – as 小易
- 2008 – Lady Cop & Papa Crook (大搜查之女) – as 霍青松
- 2008 – Kung Fu Panda (Hong Kong Cantonese dub) – as Po
- 2009 – I Corrupt All Cops (金錢帝國) – as 陳細九
- 2010 – Dream Home (維多利亞一號) – as 鄭麗嫦男友
- 2010 – Lover's Discourse
- 2011 – Mr. and Mrs. Single
- 2011 – Love in Space
- 2011 – East Meets West 2011
- 2011 – Strawberry Cliff (贖命) – as Darren
- 2014 – Golden Chicken 3
- 2015 – 12 Golden Ducks
- 2015 – Office
- 2016 – See You Tomorrow
- 2017 – Our Shining Days (闪光少女)
- 2018 – Keep Calm and Be a Superstar
