= Matthew Glave =

American actor

- Glave in 2026
- Occupation: Actor
- Years active: 1991–present
- Spouse: Anita Barone (m. 2000)
- Children: 2

Matthew Glave is an American actor best known for his recurring roles in the television shows Picket Fences, ER, Charmed, Stargate SG-1, Army Wives, Girlfriends' Guide to Divorce, Better Things, Angie Tribeca and The Rookie. His best known films are The Wedding Singer, Baby's Day Out, Safety and Funny Story.

== Career ==
Glave has appeared in numerous television shows, including recurring roles as Deputy Bud Skeeter on Picket Fences, Dr. Dale Edson in ER, Colonel Paul Emerson in Stargate SG-1, Lt. Colonel Evan Connors in Army Wives, and Oscar Hutchinson in The Rookie.

He also had a guest role on two episodes of Charmed as Curtis Williamson, a doctor who gained the Charmed Ones' powers through blood transfusions.

In 1997, Glave appeared in Quincy Long's play The Joy of Going Somewhere Definite at the Mark Taper Forum, costarring with Gregg Henry and Frederick Coffin.

He has also appeared in Cheers, NYPD Blue, Millennium, The X-Files, Will & Grace, CSI, and Nikita, among others. He played the philandering "1980's guy" fiancé Glenn Gulia to Drew Barrymore's character in 1998's The Wedding Singer, alongside Adam Sandler and Drew Barrymore. He also played the brother to Mark Wahlberg in the movie Rock Star, in 2000. He played Bennington Cotwell in the 1994 film Baby's Day Out. He also played antagonistic Brick Davis in the 2001 comedy film Corky Romano. In 2011, he played the antagonist Dr. Olson in Disney Channel's The Suite Life Movie. He also played Wayne in My Name Is Earl.

He appeared in the second episode ABC drama series Revenge, as a wealthy Wall Street hedge fund manager Bill Harmon, in September 2011. He also made appearances in The Closer and the film Argo.

Glave also appeared in the re-imagined Hawaii Five-0 TV series, guest-starring in the Season 4 episode, "Na hala a ka makua (Sins of the Father)", playing a fake FBI agent who is actually infamous gangster Julian Lynch.

Since 2019, Glave has appeared on The Rookie as one of the series' main villains, Oscar Hutchinson; he is one of the only villains on the series to appear in each season.

He starred in the 2018 feature film Funny Story, written and directed by Michael J. Gallagher, which co-starred Emily Bett Rickards. The film premiered at the 2018 Slamdance Film Festival in Utah, and went on to win the Audience Award at the Sonoma International Film Festival in California. Glave won the Best of the Fest, Best Actor Award at the Breckenridge Festival of Film in September 2018, and is nominated in the Leading Actor in a Feature category at the Southampton International Film Festival, due to be awarded in October 2018.

== Personal life ==
Glave is married to actress Anita Barone, with whom he has two daughters, Madeline and Roxanne. He currently lives in Los Angeles with his family.

== Filmography ==
=== Film ===
| Year | Title | Role | Notes |
|---|---|---|---|
| 1993 | Ghost in the Machine | Rookie cop | |
| 1994 | Chasers | Rory Blanes | |
| 1994 | Baby's Day Out | Bennington Cotwell | |
| 1997 | Plump Fiction | Nicky Cox | |
| 1998 | The Wedding Singer | Glenn Gulia | |
| 2001 | Rock Star | Joe Cole | |
| 2001 | Corky Romano | Agent Brick Davis | |
| 2001 | Ricochet River | Frank Jukor | |
| 2005 | Lost in Plainview | JW | |
| 2006 | Diggers | South Shell Guy #1 | |
| 2007 | The List | Phillip | |
| 2008 | Visioneers | Roger | |
| 2008 | Get Smart | Secret Service Agent Driver | |
| 2010 | House Broken | Hector | |
| 2012 | Argo | Col. Charles W. Scott | |
| 2016 | Jimmy Vestvood: Amerikan Hero | Hank Shannity | |
| 2016 | The Dog Lover | Mr. Gold | |
| 2016 | The Thinning | Gov. Dean Redding | |
| 2018 | Funny Story | Walter | |
| 2018 | Dirt | Harvey Pearson | |
| 2018 | First Man | Chuck Yeager | |
| 2018 | First Timers | Agent Cole | |
| 2018 | The Thinning: New World Order | Gov. Dean Redding | |
| 2019 | International Falls | Gary | |
| 2020 | The Way Back | Coach Lombardo | |
| 2020 | Leave 'Em Laughing | Dick Shawn | |
| 2020 | Uncorked | Rayland | |
| 2020 | Safety | Tommy Bowden | |
| 2026 | The Leader | | |

=== Television ===
| Year | Title | Role | Notes |
|---|---|---|---|
| 1991 | Babe Ruth | Joe Dugan | Television film |
| 1992 | L.A. Law | Robbie Richards | Episode: "From Here to Paternity" |
| 1992 | Cheers | Bartender | Episode: "The Beer Is Always Greener" |
| 1993 | Doogie Howser, M.D. | Les | Episode: "Spell It 'M-A-N'" |
| 1993 | For Their Own Good | Mike Yates | Television film |
| 1994 | Walker, Texas Ranger | Mitch Travis | Episode: "Mustangs" |
| 1994 | Diagnosis: Murder | Roger Valin | 2 episodes |
| 1995 | If Not for You | Gary Schaffer | Episode: "Pilot" |
| 1995 | JAG | Lt. Jack 'Ripper' Carter | 2 episodes |
| 1995 | The Marshal | Deputy Jonathan Tucker | Episode: "Land of Opportunity" |
| 1995–1996 | Picket Fences | Deputy Bud Skeeter | 7 episodes |
| 1996–2002 | ER | Dr. Dale Edson | 15 episodes |
| 1997 | Cybill | Jim Hicks | Episode: "Little Bo Peep" |
| 1997 | True Women | William King | Miniseries |
| 1998 | NYPD Blue | Jason | 2 episodes |
| 1998 | Rude Awakening | Lenny | Episode: "Lucky for Me Her Breast Exploded" |
| 1998 | Legalese | Kurt Lee | Television film |
| 1999 | Mutiny | Lt. Kirby | Television film |
| 1999 | Millennium | Edward Cuffle | Episode: "Via Dolorosa" |
| 1999, 2002 | Touched by an Angel | Young Max / Sgt. Walker | 2 episodes |
| 2000 | The Huntress | Dirk Mancini | Episode: "Pilot" |
| 2000 | Charmed | Dr. Curtis Williamson | 2 episodes |
| 2002 | Family Law | Reverend Williams | Episode: "Big Brother" |
| 2002 | The X-Files | Special Agent Kallenbrunner | Episode: "The Truth" |
| 2002 | Crossing Jordan | FBI Special Agent Aaron Miller | Episode: "One Twelve" |
| 2003 | Will & Grace | Kirk | Episode: "Field of Queens" |
| 2003 | The Shield | Mike | Episode: "Homewrecker" |
| 2003 | The West Wing | Scott Holcomb | Episode: "The California 47th" |
| 2003 | The Lyon's Den | Attorney Carl Green | 2 episodes |
| 2003 | Good Morning, Miami | Phil | Episode: "Will You Still Leave Me Tomorrow?" |
| 2005 | Las Vegas | Jason Decker | Episode: "Hide & Sneak" |
| 2005 | E-Ring | CIA Agt. John Haines | Episode: "The Forgotten" |
| 2005 | Life on a Stick | Rick Lackerson | 13 episodes |
| 2005, 2015 | CSI: Crime Scene Investigation | Ken Bixler / Officer Matt Glazer, LAPD | 2 episodes |
| 2006 | Stargate SG-1 | Colonel Paul Emerson | 6 episodes |
| 2006 | Cold Case | Carl Bradley (1979) | Episode: "The Key" |
| 2007 | The New Adventures of Old Christine | Benjamin 'Ben' Michael | Episode: "My Big Fat Sober Wedding" |
| 2007 | Without a Trace | Leo | Episode: "Clean Up" |
| 2008–2009 | Army Wives | Lt. Colonel Evan Connors | 16 episodes |
| 2009 | My Name Is Earl | Wayne | Episode: "Chaz Dalton's Space Academy" |
| 2009 | Nip/Tuck | Jerry | 2 episodes |
| 2009 | Crash | Bauer Lermontov | 3 episodes |
| 2010 | Accidentally on Purpose | Officer Ravitz | 2 episodes |
| 2010 | The Closer | Kevin Mason | Episode: "Executive Order" |
| 2010 | Medium | Dr. Heath Timlin | Episode: "Talk to the Hand" |
| 2011 | Desperate Housewives | Detective Foster | 2 episodes |
| 2011 | Criminal Minds | Detective Bailey | Episode: "Sense Memory" |
| 2011 | The Suite Life Movie | Dr. Olsen | Television film |
| 2011 | Funny or Die Presents... | Panetti | Episode #2.10 |
| 2011 | The Glades | Dwight Stewart | Episode: "Beached" |
| 2011 | Nikita | Jonathan Gaines | Episode: "Clawback" |
| 2011, 2012 | Revenge | Bill Harmon | 2 episodes |
| 2012 | CSI: Miami | Larry Hopper | Episode: "At Risk" |
| 2012 | Touch | Frank Robbins | Episode: "Gyre, Part 1" |
| 2012 | Suits | Thomas Walsh's Lawyer | Episode: "All In" |
| 2012 | Perception | Senator Scott Ryland | 2 episodes |
| 2012 | The Neighbors | Bill | Episode: "Things Just Got Real" |
| 2012 | Raising Hope | Big W | Episode: "The Walk for the Runs" |
| 2012, 2013 | Shake It Up | J.J. Jones | 2 episodes |
| 2013 | Shameless | Scott Walker | Episode: "Frank the Plumber" |
| 2013 | Hell on Wheels | Dick Barlow | Episode: "Eminent Domain" |
| 2014 | Hawaii Five-0 | Lead FBI Agent Kohl / Julian Lynch | Episode: "Na hala a ka makua" |
| 2014 | Mad Men | Bill Hartley | Episode: "The Strategy" |
| 2014 | Growing Up Fisher | Principal Sloan | 6 episodes |
| 2014 | Agents of S.H.I.E.L.D. | Roger Browning | Episode: "Shadows" |
| 2014 | Parenthood | Mr. Jones | Episode: "Lean In" |
| 2014 | American Horror Story | Larry Gayheart | Episode: "Orphans" |
| 2015 | Truth Be Told | Steve | Episode: "Love Thy Neighbor" |
| 2015–2017 | Girlfriends' Guide to Divorce | Gordon Beech | 16 episodes |
| 2016 | All the Way | Carl Sanders | Television film |
| 2016 | Rosewood | Andre Ward | Episode: "Badges & Bombshells" |
| 2016, 2017 | Narcos | Mike Spencer | 2 episodes |
| 2016–2018 | Angie Tribeca | Vice President Joe Perry / Mayor Joe Perry | 12 episodes |
| 2016–2020 | Better Things | Xander Hall | 9 episodes |
| 2017 | Drive Share | Hannah's Dad | Episode: "Marry Me?" |
| 2017 | Grace and Frankie | Officer Tuttle | Episode: "The Burglary" |
| 2017 | Feud | Joseph Cotten | 2 episodes |
| 2017 | Do You Want to See a Dead Body? | Mel | Episode: "A Body and a Breakup" |
| 2017, 2018 | The Mick | Howard Buckley | 2 episodes |
| 2018 | American Woman | Cal | Episode: "Obstacles and Assets" |
| 2018 | Culture Clash | Nick | Television film |
| 2019 | NCIS | Navy Commander John McGee | Episode: "Once Upon A Tim" |
| 2019 | Santa Clarita Diet | Bob Zekeman | Episode: "More of a Cat Person" |
| 2019–present | The Rookie | Oscar Hutchinson | 7 episodes |
| 2020 | Brews Brothers | Warren | Episode: "The Trink" |
| 2021 | Bronzeville | Detective Joe Parkson | Episode: "15, 34" |
| 2021 | Rebel | Tommy Flynn | 5 episodes |
