= Timmy Hung =

Hong Kong actor

- 洪天明
- Born: Timmy Hung Tin-ming; British Hong Kong
- Occupation: Actor
- Years active: 1990–present
- Spouse: Janet Chow (m. 2012)
- Children: Hung Dai-yan (son); Hung King-xi (son)
- Parents: Sammo Hung (father); Jo Eun-ok (mother)
- Relatives: Joyce Godenzi (stepmother)
- Family: Jimmy Hung (brother); Sammy Hung (brother); Stephanie Hung (sister)
- Awards: TVB Anniversary Awards – My Favourite On-Screen Partners (Non-Dramas); 2000 《公益開心百萬Show》

Chinese name
Transcriptions
Standard Mandarin
- Hanyu Pinyin: Hóng Tián Míng
Yue: Cantonese
- Jyutping: Hung4 Tin1 Ming4

Timmy Hung Tin-ming is a Hong Kong actor. He is the eldest son of Sammo Hung.

== Background ==
He was born in Hong Kong as the eldest son of martial arts superstar Sammo Hung and Sammo's Korean first wife Jo Eun-ok (曹恩玉). His younger brothers are Jimmy Hung and Sammy Hung. His only sister is Stephanie Hung.

== Personal life ==
He married actress Janet Chow in 2012 after a few years of dating, and their son Hung Dai-yan (洪大仁) was born in 2013. In April 2015, they had a second son, Hung King-xi (洪竟琋).

== Filmography ==
=== Film ===
Year	Title	Role
1990	Licence to Steal 龍鳳賊捉賊	French security guard
1991	Slickers vs. Killers 黐線枕邊人	Gang Member
1995	Red Zone 爆炸令	Greyhound
1995	Don't Give a Damn 冇面俾	Timmy
1995	Thunderbolt 霹靂火	Saw's thug (uncredited)
1997	Mr. Nice Guy 一個好人	Assistant Action Director
1997	97 Aces Go Places 最佳拍檔之醉街拍檔	Police special force
1998	Knock Off; KO 雷霆一擊	Assistant Action Director
1998	The Three Lusketeers 風流3壯士	Jack
1998	Troublesome Night 4 陰陽路4與鬼同行	Alan Hung
1998	B Is for Boy 心思思	
1998	A Long and Forgotten Ghost Story 榕樹頭講鬼	
1999	Bodyguard for the Dead 屍家保鑣	Timmy
2000	Textiles at Heart 裳在我心間	Bo
2001	Feng Shui and Gambling 風水賭神	
2001	Dark War 暗鬥	Brother
2003	Dragon Loaded 龍咁威2003	"Emotional Soccer" demonstrator
2003	Men Suddenly in Black 大丈夫	Himself
2004	Astonishing 驚心動魄	Siu Yu
2004	Osaka Wrestling Restaurant 大阪撻一餐	Ricky
2004	New Police Story 新警察故事	Tin Ming
2004	The Marksman 神槍手	Chow Chi Fai
2005	SPL 殺破狼	Drug trafficker
2005	Demoniac Flash 飄移凶間	
2005	Legend of the Dragon 龍威父子	Richard
2006	Undercover Hidden Dragon 臥虎	Bro Bomb
2006	Midnight Running 反斗狂奔	Paul
2006	Don't Open Your Eyes 鬼眼刑警	Wai
2006	Men Suddenly in Black II 大丈夫2	
2006	Fatal Contact 黑拳	Portland Street Fighter
2006	Wo Hu 至尊無賴	Eric
2007	Flash Point 導火線	Yeung
2007	The Valiant Ones New 新忠烈圖	
2008	Hong Kong Bronx 黑勢力	Kau Fai
2008	Three Kingdoms: Resurrection of the Dragon 三國志見龍卸甲	Han Ying
2008	The Luckiest Man 大四喜	Ho Kei
2009	Kung Fu Chefs 功夫廚神	Leung
2009	I Corrupt All Cops 金錢帝國	Pastry
2009	Bright Future 大有前途	
2010	72 Tenants of Prosperity; 72家租客	
2010	Marriage with a Liar 婚前試愛	
2011	I Love Hong Kong 我愛HK開心萬歲	
2011	Love is the Only Answer 人約離婚後	
2011	Hong Kong Ghost Stories 猛鬼愛情故事	
2012	Naked Soldier	Pete
2012	Lan Kwai Fong 2	
2013	Young and Dangerous: Reloaded	
2013	Princess and the Seven Kung Fu Masters	
2013	Fall in Love	
2013	Ip Man: The Final Fight	Leung Sheung
2013	Flash Play	
2014	The True Love	
2015	Office	Ho Ho
2015	Blind Spot	
2016	Buddy Cops	
2016	Delusion	
2016	Three	Chak
2017	God of War	
2018	Kung Fu League	
2019	Altar Angel	
2019	Chasing News	
2019	Death Notify	
2019	Thirteen and a Half	
2020	Shock Wave 2	King
2022	Septet: The Story of Hong Kong	Master
2023	Back to the Past	
2024	Crisis Negotiators	Wai Lun

=== Television series ===
Year	Title	Role	Notes
1997	Detective Investigation Files III 《刑事偵緝檔案III》	Yung Ka Kun 翁家勤	
1998	Burning Flame 《烈火雄心》	Sei Suk 四 叔	
1998	Aiming High 《撻出愛火花》	Lam Tin Fung 林天峰	
1999	Untraceable Evidence II 《鑑證實錄II》	Kui Chin Pui 區展培	
1999	Anti-Crime Squad 《反黑先鋒》	Cho Mang Chai 草蜢仔	
2000	Ups and Downs 《無業樓民》	Hung Kam Po 洪金寶 (Bowie)	
2001	Virtues of Harmony 《皆大歡喜》	Sek Biu 石彪	
2003	Hearts of Fencing 《當四葉草碰上劍尖時》	Exchange Student	
2003	Angels of Mission 《無名天使3D》	See Yat Ming 史一鳴	
2004	Hearts of Fencing 2 《當四葉草碰上劍尖時》		
2006	Real Kung Fu 《佛山贊師父》	Chan Ya Shun 陳華順	
2007	The Building Blocks of Life 《建築有情天》	Chow Lap Chun 周立春	
2009	The Stew of Life 《有營煮婦》	Lau Tak Yan 劉達人 (Ryan)	
2010-2011	Links to Temptation 《誘情轉駁》	Lau Hau-fai 劉孝輝	
2010-2011	Home Troopers 《居家兵團》	Cheung Lok Tin 張樂天	
2011	A Great Way to Care 《仁心解碼》	Yu Gwun Wai 余鈞緯 (Nelson / Sartre)	
2014-2015	Tiger Cubs II 《飛虎II》	Poon Chi-lung 潘子龍	
2015	Wudang Rules 《潮拜武當》	Cheung Ka-kong 張家港 (Ken)	
2015	The Fixer	Wyman Chan Tai-man 陳大文	
