= Explicit Content =

Explicit Content may refer to:

- Parental Advisory, warning label used by the music industry
- Explicit Content (song), 2019 song by Charmaine Fong
- Explicit content in Wikipedia

== See also ==
- Explicit (disambiguation)
