= Naked Soldier =

2012 Hong Kong film by Marco Mak

- Film poster
- Directed by: Marco Mak
- Written by: Wong Jing
- Produced by: Wong Jing
- Starring: Jennifer Tse; Sammo Hung; Andy On; Ankie Beilke; Philip Ng; Jiang Luxia; Lena Lam; Ellen Chan; Anthony Wong
- Cinematography: Cheung Man-po; Miu Kin-fai
- Edited by: Lee Kar-wing; Marco Mak
- Music by: Raymond Wong
- Production company: Mega-Vision Pictures
- Distributed by: See Movie Limited
- Release date: 23 August 2012
- Running time: 100 minutes
- Country: Hong Kong
- Language: Cantonese

Naked Soldier (Chinese: 絕色武器) is a 2012 Hong Kong action film directed by Marco Mak and starring Jennifer Tse. It is the third installment of the "Naked" series, which includes Naked Killer (1992) and Naked Weapon (2002).

== Plot ==
The story of Phoenix who was kidnapped, when she was a child, by Madame Rose after killing her family except for Phoenix's father, Interpol agent CK Lung, who is still struggling to find his daughter. Phoenix is now an assassin under Madam Rose's orders. She is given a target: her own father.

== Cast ==
- Jennifer Tse as Phoenix
- Sammo Hung as CK Lung
- Ellen Chan as Madame Rose
- Philip Ng as Black Dragon
- Ankie Beilke as Selina
- Andy On as Sam Wong
- Jia-Qi Kang as Wai-Chu Lung/Skinny
- Lena Lam as Ivy
- Jiang Luxia as Thai Assassin
- Ian Powers as Honey/Mafia Chief
- Timmy Hung as Pete
- Anthony Wong as Power
