= Licence to Steal =

1990 Hong Kong film by Billy Chan

- Directed by: Billy Chan
- Written by: Johnny Lee
- Produced by: Sammo Hung
- Starring: Joyce Godenzi; Yuen Biao; Agnes Aurelio; Collin Chou; Richard Ng
- Cinematography: Wingle Chan
- Edited by: Peter Cheung; Joseph Chiang
- Music by: Richard Yuen
- Distributed by: Golden Princess Amusement Co., Ltd.
- Release date: 1990
- Running time: 105 minutes
- Country: Hong Kong
- Language: Cantonese
- Budget: HK $4,041,582

Licence to Steal (Chinese: 龍鳳賊捉賊) is a 1990 Hong Kong action film directed by Billy Chan. It stars Joyce Godenzi, Yuen Biao and Sammo Hung in a cameo role.

== Plot ==
Two sisters who are burglars find themselves at risk when one of them falls in love with the nephew of the police detective assigned to arrest them.

== Cast ==
- Joyce Godenzi - Kuang / Hung
- Yuen Biao - Swordsman
- Agnes Aurelio - Ngan Ping
- Richard Ng - Inspector Tam Hsiang Ken
- Collin Chou - Yang Chuan Kuang (as Sing Ngai)
- Alvina Kong - Hsiao Yen
- Billy Chow - Hitman
- Chui Jing-Yat - Ngan's sidekick
- Corey Yuen - Cop
- Peter Chan Lung - Cop
- Lau Shun - Uncle Ting
- Lam Chung - Police Inspector
- Gabriel Wong - Robber
- Yeung Jing-Jing - China Tourist
- Michael Dinga - Liaison for French Embassy
- Sammo Hung - French Security Guard
- Timmy Hung - French Security Guard
- Carina Lau
- Roger Thomas
- Jeff Falcon
- Bruce Law

== Box office ==
The film grossed HK$4,041,582 at the Hong Kong box office during its theatrical run from 1 November to 9 November 1990.
