= Janet Chow =

Hong Kong actress (born 1983)

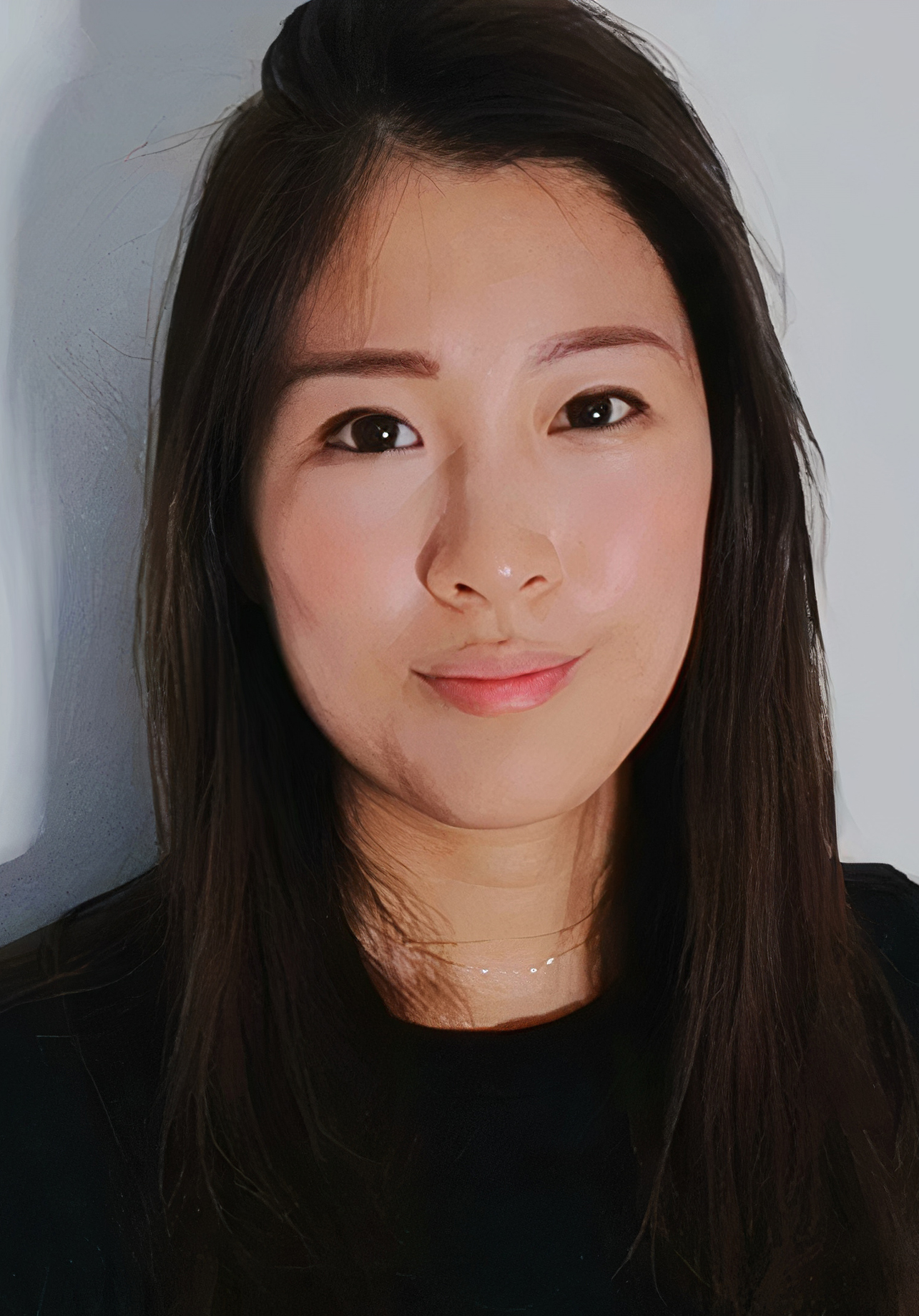
- Chow shooting a promotional video of The Future Cut Fashion Design Competition Asia in 2018
- Born: 25 August 1983 (age 43); Hong Kong
- Years active: 2004–present
- Spouse: Timmy Hung (m. 2012)
- Children: 2
- Relatives: Sammo Hung (father-in-law)

Chinese name
Transcriptions
Standard Mandarin
- Hanyu Pinyin: Zhōu Jiāwèi
Yue: Cantonese
- Jyutping: zau1 gaa1 wai6

Janet Chow (Chinese: 周家蔚) (born 25 August 1983, in Hong Kong) is a Hong Kong actress and beauty pageant titleholder. She has ancestry in Shanghai. She was the 2nd runner-up in the 2006 Miss Hong Kong competition.

== Personal life ==
She immigrated to Canada at age 7. She married actor Timmy Hung in 2012 with a grand wedding. In 2013 their son Hung Dai-yan was born. In April 2015, they had a second son, Hung King-xi. Her father-in-law Sammo Hung is also an actor and a martial artist.

== Pageant career ==
Both Chow, and Miss Hong Kong 2006 winner Aimee Chan Yan Mei, had competed at Miss Chinese Toronto 2004, although each failed to place. Chow was the only contestant of the pageant born in Hong Kong. Later, Chow joined the top 16 of the Miss Hong Kong 2006 pageant as one of four women who were selected from overseas (Toronto) to compete. During the finals, she won the Miss Photogenic award, and received the highest swimsuit score (44) during her catwalk, although her interview only merited 34 points. She eventually placed as first runner-up.

She represented Hong Kong at the Miss World 2006 pageant due to the winner of Miss Hong Kong, Aimee Chan, being overage.

== Television career ==
Chow has appeared as an actress for A Fistful of Stances, Fly with Me, Some Day, Growing Through Life, Every Move You Make, Forensic Heroes III, and Let it Be Love for Television Broadcasts Limited Hong Kong.

== Awards ==
- Miss Hong Kong 2006 First Runner-Up
- Miss Hong Kong 2006 Miss Photogenic
