= Teen Choice Award for Choice Action TV Actress =

Entertainment award category

The following is a list of Teen Choice Award winners and nominees for Choice TV Actress - Action. This award was first introduced (along with Choice TV Actor - Action and Choice TV - Action) in 2008.

== Winners and nominees ==
=== 2000s ===
Year	Winner	Nominees	Ref.
2008	Hayden Panettiere – Heroes	Summer Glau – Terminator: The Sarah Connor Chronicles; Kristin Kreuk – Smallville; Ali Larter – Heroes; Evangeline Lilly – Lost	
2009	Hayden Panettiere – Heroes	Kristen Bell – Heroes; Summer Glau – Terminator: The Sarah Connor Chronicles; Kristin Kreuk – Smallville; Ali Larter – Heroes	

=== 2010s ===
Year	Winner	Nominees	Ref.
2010	Yvonne Strahovski – Chuck	Gabrielle Anwar – Burn Notice; Mary Lynn Rajskub – 24; Daniela Ruah – NCIS: Los Angeles; Katee Sackhoff – 24	
2011	Linda Hunt – NCIS: Los Angeles	Lyndsy Fonseca – Nikita; Grace Park – Hawaii Five-0; Maggie Q – Nikita; Yvonne Strahovski – Chuck	
2012	Linda Hunt – NCIS: Los Angeles	Lyndsy Fonseca – Nikita; Grace Park – Hawaii Five-0; Maggie Q – Nikita; Yvonne Strahovski – Chuck	
2013	Lucy Liu – Elementary	Lyndsy Fonseca – Nikita; Grace Park – Hawaii Five-0; Maggie Q – Nikita; Monica Raymund – Chicago Fire	
2017	Melissa Benoist – Supergirl	Jordana Brewster – Lethal Weapon; Caity Lotz – Legends of Tomorrow; Danielle Panabaker – The Flash; Candice Patton – The Flash; Emily Bett Rickards – Arrow	
2018	Melissa Benoist – Supergirl	Chloe Bennet - Agents of S.H.I.E.L.D.; Caity Lotz – Legends of Tomorrow; Danielle Panabaker – The Flash; Candice Patton – The Flash; Emily Bett Rickards – Arrow	
2019	Gabrielle Union - L.A.'s Finest	Jessica Alba - L.A.'s Finest; Melissa Benoist - Supergirl; Danielle Panabaker - The Flash; Candice Patton - The Flash; Emily Bett Rickards - Arrow	
