= Dakota's Summer =

- DVD cover
- Directed by: Timothy Armstrong
- Written by: Timothy Armstrong
- Produced by: Ben Feingold; Ash R. Shah; Jim Busfield
- Starring: Haley Ramm; Jade Pettyjohn; Julie Ann Emery; Emily Bett Rickards; Spencer Boldman; Marin Hinkle; Leslie-Anne Huff; Glynn Turman; Keith Carradine
- Cinematography: Andy Strahorn
- Edited by: Josh Noyes
- Music by: Todd Haberman
- Production companies: Sense and Sensibility Ventures; Silver Nitrate
- Release date: April 1, 2014
- Running time: 90 minutes
- Country: United States
- Language: English
- Budget: $1.8 million

Cowgirls and Angels: Dakota's Summer is a 2014 independently produced family drama, written and directed by Timothy Armstrong, and starring Haley Ramm and Keith Carradine. It is a sequel to the 2012 film Cowgirls 'n Angels and the second film in the Cowgirls 'n Angels series. The film premiered at the 2014 Dallas International Film Festival.

== Plot ==
Dakota Rose (Haley Ramm) dreams of following in her famous family's footsteps and becoming a champion trick rider. However the shocking news that she was in fact adopted at birth leads her to question both herself and her place in her family's legacy.

== Cast ==
- Haley Ramm as Dakota Rose
- Keith Carradine as Austin Rose
- Haley Pullos as Marybeth Mitchell
- Jade Pettyjohn as Summer Jennings
- Emily Bett Rickards as Kristin Rose
- Marin Hinkle as Clara
- Julie Ann Emery as Annie Cayne
- Bryan Dechart as Taylor Chase
- Spencer Boldman as Bryce
- Leslie-Anne Huff as Madison De La Cruz
- Glynn Turman as Isaac Benson
- Kimberly Whalen as Dawn Morton

== Production ==
=== Casting ===
In July 2013, it was announced that Spencer Boldman would be starring in the movie, opposite Haley Ramm.

=== Filming ===
The film was originally planned to be filmed in Texas but producer Ben Feingold took the decision to relocate the production to Louisiana just weeks before shooting was due to begin because of tax credit incentives offered by the state. Much of the filming took place in the town of Keachi.

Ramm had previous experience horse-riding but was only permitted to perform limited 'horse-tricks', due to concerns that the actress may get hurt. The majority of the horse-riding stunts featured in the film were performed by Texas-based all-female trick-riding group 'The Dynamite Dames'.

== Soundtrack ==
Country artist Amber Hayes recorded a cover version of "Cotton-Eyed Joe" for the film, produced by Charles Kelley. The singer appears in a cameo role in the film, performing the track. Her original track "Home" also features on the film's soundtrack.

== Release ==
The film premiered at the 2014 Dallas International Film Festival. The film was released digitally on April 1, 2014, and on DVD on April 25, 2014.

== See also ==
- List of films about horses
