= S for Sex, S for Secret =

2015 Hong Kong film by Jill Wong

- Film poster
- Directed by: Jill Wong
- Written by: Patrick Kong
- Produced by: Patrick Kong; Shirley Yung
- Cinematography: S.K. Yip
- Edited by: Li Ka-Wing
- Music by: Ben Chong; Tang Chi-Wai; Yip Shu-Fai; Yip Siu-Chung
- Production company: Sundream Motion Pictures
- Release date: 15 January 2015
- Running time: 100 minutes
- Country: Hong Kong
- Language: Cantonese
- Box office: HK$2.33 million (Hong Kong)

S for Sex, S for Secret (Chinese: 小姐誘心) is a 2015 Hong Kong comedy film. It was released on 15 January 2015.

== Cast ==
- Annie Liu
- Pakho Chau
- Jacquelin Chong
- Philip Keung
- Jeana Ho
- Kabby Hui
- Edward Ma
- Bryant Mak
- Bob Lam
- Elva Ni
- Winki Lai
- Jessica Cambensy

== Reception ==
The film has earned HK$2.33 million at the Hong Kong box office. It received negative reviews from South China Morning Post, which gave it one star out of five.
