= Cowgirls 'n Angels =

- DVD cover
- Directed by: Timothy Armstrong
- Written by: Timothy Armstrong; Stephen Blinn
- Produced by: Ben Feingold; Shawn Griffith; Jim Busfield; Timothy Armstrong
- Starring: Bailee Madison; Alicia Witt; Kathleen Rose Perkins; Frankie Faison; Dora Madison Burge; Leslie-Anne Huff; Drew Waters; Noel Coet; Jackson Rathbone; James Cromwell
- Cinematography: John Barr
- Edited by: Michael Rafferty
- Music by: Alan Williams
- Production companies: Sense and Sensibility Ventures; Silver Nitrate
- Distributed by: Samuel Goldwyn Films
- Release dates: April 18, 2012 (Dallas International Film Festival); May 25, 2012 (United States)
- Running time: 91 minutes
- Country: United States
- Language: English
- Box office: $120,680

Cowgirls 'n Angels is a 2012 American family film starring Bailee Madison, James Cromwell, and Jackson Rathbone. The film was directed by Timothy Armstrong from a script by Armstrong and Stephen Blinn.

== Plot ==
12-year-old Ida Clayton (Bailee Madison) lives with her single mother, Elaine (Alicia Witt) in urban Oklahoma, but Ida's summer days are boring and full of nothing to do, so she begins sneaking off to rodeos in order to keep herself entertained. Ida's father, a man named Walker whom she never met, is a subject that Elaine refuses to speak about, and is part of the reason why she disapproves of rodeos. When Ida is given the opportunity to tour America with The Sweethearts of the Rodeo, a group of young women who perform at rodeos, Ida takes it, and after several scenes, Elaine approves. Ida quickly befriends the Sweethearts managers, Terence Parker (James Cromwell) and his daughter, Rebecca (Kathleen Rose Perkins). She sets off on a quest, looking for her father with the help of fellow Sweethearts, troubled, retiring alcoholic, Kansas (Dora Madison Burge), Madison (Leslie-Anne Huff) and Kansas's new lover whom Rebecca disapproves of, Justin Wood (Jackson Rathbone).

== Cast ==
- Bailee Madison as Ida Clayton
- James Cromwell as Terence Parker
- Jackson Rathbone as Justin Wood
- Alicia Witt as Elaine Clayton
- Kathleen Rose Perkins as Rebecca Parker
- Frankie Faison as Augustus
- Dora Madison Burge as Kansas
- Leslie-Anne Huff as Madison De La Cruz
- Drew Waters as Rawley West / Walker
- Noel Coet as Nora
- Mark Nutter as "other" Walker
- Amber Hayes as Amber Grant
- Richie McDonald as Doug Grant

== Production ==
=== Development ===
Cowgirls 'N Angels was shot in Stillwater, Oklahoma, Guthrie, Oklahoma including Lazy E Arena and Pawnee, Oklahoma and environs during April–May 2011. The film used already existing rodeos to complete the look as well as two staged rodeos. Rodeo and horseback riding facilities of Oklahoma State University and Barnum Ranch as well as the facilities in Pawnee were used in the shoot and the filmmakers also shot the Guthrie Oklahoma annual parade which included the fictional Sweethearts of the Rodeo drill and trick riding group. The production retained the services of the Sky High Angels drill team from Arkansas as the core Sweethearts of the Rodeo and added the actors cast as well as three professional trick riders from Oklahoma and nearby Texas. One of the trick riders, Haley Ganzel, was cast as Rose in the production for authenticity. Another trick rider actually doubled for both Madison and also Ida's fall from her horse Prince in the film. Production went well notwithstanding extreme weather conditions which included high winds, rain, extreme heat as well as a large tornado which required the cast and crew to hide in the basement tornado shelter of the Stillwater National Bank in Stillwater. Multiple drafts of the script were written prior to productions and a number of changes were made on the set based on input from the film's cast, crew and production team.

== Release ==
Production was completed by 15 July 2011. Samuel Goldwyn Films released the film theatrically in the USA on May 25, 2012, after its world Premier in the Dallas International Film Festival, Dallas Texas. Twentieth Century Fox released the DVD & Blu-ray in the USA on October 2, 2012.

=== Music ===
The Cowgirls 'N Angels soundtrack is filled with young country pop artists many of whom are from Oklahoma including Amber Hayes, Maggie McClure, Susan Herndon, Caitlin Rose, The Powwows, and Kim DiVine. An original composition Always There For Me performed by Richie McDonald, formerly of the band Lonestar, and Amber Hayes, as part of the father daughter motif is included both in the soundtrack as well as performed in the film's honky tonk sequence. The soundtrack is available digitally on iTunes, Amazon.com, Google Play, and many other digital outlets.

=== Book ===
A Cowgirls 'N Angels book was created to accompany the film. The book was written by Timothy Armstrong, Pam Bassuk, and Stephen Blinn.

== Reception ==
=== Critical response ===
The film received mainly positive reviews, with critics praising its "family-friendly" appeal.

==== Box office ====
The film opened to $54,675 and went on to gross $120,680 in Domestic box office takings.

== Sequels ==
A sequel to the film, entitled Cowgirls 'n Angels: Dakota's Summer, premiered at the Dallas International Film Festival in 2014. Written and directed by Timothy Armstrong, the film followed new characters, and starred Haley Ramm as the titular Dakota, alongside Keith Carradine, Spencer Boldman and Emily Bett Rickards.

Another sequel titled A Cowgirl's Story was released on April 18, 2017, and was directed by Armstong. This film features Bailee Madison from Cowgirls 'n Angels, but this time played a different character Dusty Rhodes. It also stars Chloe Lukasiak and Pat Boone.

Another sequel, A Cowgirl's Song was released on April 22, 2022, again directed by Armstrong. It stars Cheryl Ladd, Savannah Lee May and Darci Lynne.

== See also ==
- List of films about horses
