= Leslie-Anne Huff =

American actress

- Born: San Fernando Valley, California, U.S.
- Occupation: Actress
- Years active: 2006–present

Leslie-Anne Huff is an American actress.

== Life and education ==
Huff was born and raised in the San Fernando Valley. She was born to an American father and a Filipino mother.

She attended the University of California, Berkeley. She was highly involved with the Filipino community and co-produced the yearly Pilipino Cultural Night show.

== Career ==
Her career began in 2006 with a role in the television series CSI: NY. She has made guest appearances in several television series, including roles in NCIS, Bones, Days of Our Lives, Chuck, Greek and The Suite Life on Deck.

In 2008, she was cast to star in the film Strawberry Cliff, opposite Hong Kong singer Eason Chan. In 2009, she starred in the Disney Channel's first original web series, Mackenzie Falls, a stand-alone spin-off of Sonny with a Chance. In 2011, she was cast in the film Cowgirls n' Angels, starring James Cromwell, Bailee Madison, Jackson Rathbone, Dora Madison Burge, and Kathleen Rose Perkins.

In 2013, she was cast in Cowgirls 'n Angels: Dakota's Summer, the sequel to Cowgirls 'n Angels opposite Keith Carradine, Haley Ramm, Emily Bett Rickards, and Jade Pettyjohn. In 2016, Leslie became a recurring character on the seventh season of the American supernatural television series, The Vampire Diaries, as a vampire huntress named Rayna Cruz.

== Filmography ==
=== Film ===
Year	Title	Role	Notes
2009	Frozen Kiss	Jeanette	
2010	Prominare	Layla	
2011	Mardi Gras: Spring Break	Girl #2	Uncredited
2011	Strawberry Cliff	Kate	
2012	Cowgirls 'n Angels	Madison De La Cruz	
2012	The Money Shot	Penelope Shuster	Short film
2014	Cowgirls 'n Angels: Dakota's Summer	Madison De La Cruz	
2014	Rosie	Rosie	Short film, also writer and executive producer
2015	Luna	Miranda Cleland	Short film

=== Television ===
Year	Title	Role	Notes
2006	CSI: NY	Felicia Badman	Episode: "All Access"
2008	Invincible	Dupli-Kate (voice)	2 episodes
2009	Days of Our Lives	Michelle	2 episodes
2009	Mackenzie Falls	Penelope	9 minisodes
2009	10 Things I Hate About You	Jonelle	2 episodes
2009	The Suite Life on Deck	Reina	Episode: "Kitchen Casanova"
2009	Greek	Whitney	Episode: "High and Dry"
2010	Chuck	Bartender	Episode: "Chuck Versus the Nacho Sampler"
2010	Sonny with a Chance	Penelope	2 episodes
2010	Miami Medical	Candy Striper	Episode: "Like a Hurricane"
2010	Pair of Kings	Aerosol	Episode: "A Mermaid's Tail"
2010	NCIS	Hillary Lange	Episode: "Enemies Foreign"
2011	Bones	Raina Erickson	Episode: "The Bikini in the Soup"
2011	The Protector	Liz Arnold / Beth Darby	Episode: "Bangs"
2014	The Middle	Renee	Episode: "The Smell"
2016	The Vampire Diaries	Rayna Cruz	Recurring role
2016	The Originals	Rayna Cruz	Episode: "A Streetcar Named Desire"
2018	Young & Hungry	Kayla	Episode: "Young & Third Wheel"

=== Web ===
Year	Title	Role	Notes
2015	The Life Savers	Lucy	Series creator / co-writer, 5 episodes

== Philanthropy ==
In 2005, Huff co-founded the non-profit Kamay at Puso (which means "Hand and Heart" in Tagalog).

In 2010, she appeared in a charity performance of The Vagina Monologues at the Aratani Theater of the Japanese American Cultural & Community Center in Los Angeles, along with Lea Salonga, Tia Carrere, and Tamlyn Tomita.
