= Heat Team =

2004 Hong Kong film by Dante Lam

- Film poster
- Traditional Chinese: 重案黐孖Gun
- Simplified Chinese: 重案黐孖Gun
- Hanyu Pinyin: Zhòng Àn Chī Mā Gun
- Jyutping: Cung2 Ngon3 Ci1 Maa1 Gun
- Directed by: Dante Lam
- Screenplay by: Chan Hing-ka; John Chan
- Produced by: Chan Hing-ka; Jimmy Law
- Starring: Aaron Kwok; Eason Chan; Yumiko Cheng
- Narrated by: Horace Wong
- Edited by: Cheung Ka-fai
- Music by: Tommy Wai
- Production companies: Universe Entertainment; Sil-Metropole Organisation; Youth Film Studio; People's Production; China Film Co-Production Corporation
- Distributed by: Universe Entertainment
- Release date: 24 June 2004
- Running time: 108 minutes
- Country: Hong Kong
- Languages: Cantonese; Mandarin; English
- Box office: HK$1,603,003

Heat Team is a 2004 Hong Kong action film directed by Dante Lam and starring Aaron Kwok, Eason Chan and Yumiko Cheng.

== Plot ==
Lee Yiu-ting (Aaron Kwok) and Wong Kai-chung (Eason Chan) are police officers of the Regional Crime Unit of Hong Kong Island and Kowloon respectively. Both of them are ace marksmen, as well as being very agile. They are elite members of the police force who have never met.

Regional Crime Unit Superintendent Cheung Tit-chu (Danny Lee) had received information that international thief Ken Ma (Wong Ban-yuen) has secretly entered Hong Kong for a heist. Superintendent Cheung decides to organize a special operation group with elite members of the police force to take down international criminals, and Chung and Ting were recruited to the group.

Ken plans to lead his gang in a heist to steal a priceless diamond necklace. Ken and his girlfriend To Yu-fung (Victoria Wu), a jewelry appraiser, plan to retire after the heist and leave to distant parts. Ting, Chung, alongside their new female superior Fung Po-po (Yumiko Cheng) work together to investigate the whereabouts of the stolen necklace. However, the three of them do not trust each other and cause many disputes while competing for the best performance. While on the thread-less occasion, Yu-fung appears and makes a deal with the police that she will hand out the necklace if they would find and rescue Ken. At this time, Yu-fung is also being hunted by gangsters. To ensure her safety, Ting and Chung were assigned to protect Yu-fung. Since then, the relationship between them have turned from hostile to delicate and sensitive. The movie ends with Ting leaving the hospital ward after visiting Chung to recuperate from his gun shot injury.

== Cast ==
- Aaron Kwok as Lee Yu-ting
- Eason Chan as Wong Kai-chung
- Yumiko Cheng as Fung Po-Po
- Dave Wong as Yuen Pak-chun
- Wong Ban-yuen as Ken Ma Lam
- Danny Lee as Cheung Tit-chu
- Victoria Wu as To Yu-fung
- Benz Hui as Mr. Fok
- Carl Ng as Santos
- Cheuk Wan-chi as Amy
- Jude Poyer as Jude
- Jim Chim as Dr. Vincent Chu Yan
- Bernice Liu as Macy
- Jeff Kam as Luk On-tung
- Benjamin Yuen as Shun Chai
- Alex To Kong as Ka-kit
- Tommy Wong as Chef in opening sequence
- Leung Wai-yan as Susan
- Lam Chi-pao as Siu Ko
- Andy Lau Tin-lung as Eddie
- Tam Shiu-ka as Michael
- Hung Chiu as Michael Ng Chi-wah

== Reception ==
=== Critical ===
Beyond Hollywood gave the film a mixed review and wrote, "When all is said and done, I suppose 'Heat Team' is a breezy enough way to lose 95 minutes of free time. It’s not the worst of the bunch, but you can’t help but think that it could have been much better if the comedy was jettisoned completely and the whole thing was played with a straight face." Love HK Film also gave the film a mixed review and wrote "Heat Team is occasionally amusing and even fun, but don't expect it to make any sense."

=== Box office ===
The film grossed HK$1,603,003 at the box office during its theatrical run from 24 June to 21 July 2004 in Hong Kong.

== See also ==
- Aaron Kwok filmography
- Eason Chan filmography
