= Star Runner =

2003 Hong Kong film by Daniel Lee

- Theatrical release poster
- Directed by: Daniel Lee
- Written by: Abe Kwong; Taurus Chow; Daniel Lee
- Produced by: Catherine Hun (executive producer); Albert Chow; Dou Shou Fang
- Starring: Vanness Wu; Kim Hyun-joo; Max Mok; Andy On; Wong Yau-Nam; Gordon Liu
- Cinematography: Tony Cheung
- Edited by: Azreal Chung
- Music by: Henry Lai Wan-man
- Distributed by: Sil-Metropole Organisation (Hong Kong); Lions Gate (U.S. DVD)
- Release date: 27 November 2003
- Running time: 104 minutes
- Country: Hong Kong
- Languages: Cantonese; Mandarin; Korean
- Budget: $30 million

Star Runner (Chinese: 少年阿虎), (also known in the United States as The Kumite), is a 2003 Hong Kong action/romance film co-written and directed by Daniel Lee. It is rated PG-13 by the MPAA "for intense sequences of martial arts action violence".

== Plot ==
Bond Cheung (Vanness Wu) is a high school student in Hong Kong who has a strong passion for Muay Thai kick boxing. He trains at a local boxing gym, and is instructed by the Kong Ching team trainer Lau (Gordon Liu), in an effort to be a competitor in the Star Runner Pan Asian Martial Arts Competition. While attending summer courses, he is attracted to his new Korean teacher Kim Mei Chiu (Kim Hyun-Joo). It is revealed that she is recovering from a break-up in Korea with a former lover and has come to Hong Kong to start over. The two start off as friends, but after a series of fateful events occur, feelings spark, and they eventually begin seeing one another, in spite of the controversy that it creates. Then abruptly, Bond is kicked off the Kong Ching team, regarding with his coach's financial troubles, which angers him and believes that his chance in entering the competition is gone. Soon after, he is confronted by an unexpected new trainer Bill (Max Mok Siu Chung), a washed-up but well experienced former martial arts champion. After some compensation, Bill teaches Bond Chinese Kung Fu (Wing Chun, Hong Kuen) as alternative and effective fighting techniques to his kick boxing. Regained confidence, Bond then decides to enter the competition on his own, with Bill as his advisor and cornerman and they become the team Fusion Tao. The event draws entries of 18 boxing organizations from 12 countries, along with its most lethal fighter Tank Wong (Andy On) from Soul Boxing Gym team. As his relationship with Kim becomes stable, Kim's former lover sees her again, asking for forgiveness, saying that he still loves her. With her feelings torn, she decides to go back to Korea with him, but is still having second thoughts about her feelings for Bond. In the competition however, competitors are slowly eliminated one by one, as the epic fight between Bond and Tank draws closer and what will determine both fighters' destiny.

== Cast ==
- Vanness Wu as Bond Cheung
- Kim Hyun-joo as Kim Mei Chiu (Bond's love interest)
- Max Mok as Coach Bill (Bond's trainer)
- Wong You-Nam as Lau
- Andy On as Tank Wong
- Shaun Tam as Chris Young
- Chin Kar-lok as "Senior" Ho
- Gordon Liu as Coach Lau (Bond's former trainer)
- Ken Lo as Benny Wong (Tank's trainer & older brother)
- Lung Ti as Brother Lung (Wing Chun teacher)
- Graham Player as Father Sun (Hong Kuen teacher)
- David Chiang as Bond's grandfather

== Release ==
Star Runner was released in Hong Kong on 27 November 2003. In the Philippines, the film was released on 3 December 2003.

== Accolades ==
23rd Annual Hong Kong Film Awards

- Winner – Best New Artist (Andy On)
- Nomination – Best New Artist (Vanness Wu)
- Nomination – Best Action Choreography (Chin Kar-Lok)

== See also ==
- Beautiful Boxer
