= Chaos (2008 film) =

2008 Hong Kong film by Herman Yau

- DVD cover
- Traditional Chinese: 三不管
- Simplified Chinese: 三不管
- Hanyu Pinyin: Sān Bú Guǎn
- Jyutping: Saam1 Bat1 Gwun2
- Directed by: Herman Yau
- Written by: Lau Ho-leung
- Produced by: Teddy Chan
- Starring: Gordon Lam; Andrew Lin; Kristal Tin; Charmaine Fong
- Cinematography: Ngai Man-yin
- Edited by: Yau Chi-wai
- Music by: Patrick Lo
- Production companies: Fortune Star Entertainment; Sum-Wood Productions
- Distributed by: Fortune Star Entertainment
- Release date: 15 September 2008
- Running time: 90 minutes
- Country: Hong Kong
- Language: Cantonese

Chaos is a 2008 Hong Kong action thriller film directed by Herman Yau and starring Gordon Lam, Andrew Lin, Kristal Tin and Charmaine Fong.

== Plot ==
In the Walled City, the inhabitants are either cornered or have a shady past. They commit prostitution, gambling, drugs and other lawless acts. They have their own order and law. The Walled City is akin to a "limbo" zone. One day, Cheung Tai-hoi (Andrew Lin), while escorting criminal Mickey Szeto (Gordon Lam), accidentally loses control of the police van and breaks into the Walled City and is detained by its inhabitants. Walled City's overlord Crow (Alexander Chan) hate the police and believes one of them is a cop and prepares to execute one of them. At this time, a brothel owner in Walled City, Ling, (Kristal Tin) falsely accuses Mickey to be the cop. Therefore, Hoi was released while Mickey was continued to be detained. It turns out that Mickey is Ling's long lost lover and she wants him to suffer since she believes he abandoned her and her daughter, Yan (Charmaine Fong), years ago. At the same time, she also wants Mickey to help her leave Walled City because Crow has been eyeing for Yan. Yan then sees the detained Mickey, while she does not know he is her father, she had a feeling which prompt her to decide to help him escape. At the same time, a fatal plague was discovered in Walled City and the government uses this as an excuse to start a massacre that would prevent the spreading of the plague.

== Cast ==
- Gordon Lam as Mickey Szeto
- Andrew Lin as Cheung Tai-hoi
- Kristal Tin as Ling
- Charmaine Fong as Yan
- Alexander Chan as Crow
- Wong Shu-tong as Mr. Kim
- Sam Wong as Inmate 2378
- Wong Man-shing as Crow's Thug
- Chan Man-ching as Crow's Thug
- Lui Siu-ming as Crow's Thug
- Chin Yiu-wing as Crow's Thug

== Reception ==
Joseph Tse-Hei Le, of Pace University, wrote: "In Chaos, Herman Yau singles out fear, terror, violence, and the threat of violence as ingredients of Hong Kong's one country/two systems model and reveals the sense of human powerlessness under such a violent system." A review noted: "With very little Yau succeeds in creating a pretty tight and claustrophobic post-apocalyptic setting " James Mudge, on Yes Asia, stated: "Basically a Hong Kong version of John Carpenter's classic Escape from New York, the film saw Gordon Lam and Andrew Lin pitted against each other against a near future backdrop of violence and viruses. Although entertaining, the film was disappointingly tame given its certificate, especially considering the director's previous efforts in the same arena."
