= Explicit =

Explicit refers to something that is specific, clear, or detailed. It can also mean:

- Explicit knowledge, knowledge that can be readily articulated, codified and transmitted to others
- Explicit (text), the final words of a text; contrast with incipit

== See also ==
- Explicit Content
