= Gina See-Yuen Wong =

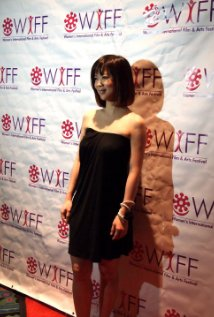
- Wong See-yuen at WIFF in Miami
- Education: University of Hong Kong
- Occupations: Filmmaker, curator
- Known for: Founder of Experimenta, Pineapple Underground Film Festival, Para/Site Art Space
- Website: experimenta.hk

Gina See-Yuen Wong (traditional Chinese: 黃思源; simplified Chinese: 黄思源; pinyin: Huáng Sīyuán) is a filmmaker and founder of the Pineapple Underground Film Festival, which screens independent films from around the world. She also runs Experimenta, a performance art space in Hong Kong.

== Career ==
=== Film Producer and Director ===
In 2009, Wong directed the video short "Shanghai Saga: Other Skies, Other Lands." The short film was selected in the International Competition section of the 55th International Short Film Festival Oberhausen. In 2011 she wrote, produced, and directed the documentary “Orient Top Town”. The film was premiered at the Women's International Film & Arts Festival in Miami, USA.

Wong produced "The Lives of Hamilton Fish" and "The Road to South" in 2013, "La Salamanda", and co-produced "Circus of Books". She directed "The Road to Day Dream Mine".

=== PUFF Film Festival ===
Wong founded and curated the Pineapple Underground Film Festival (PUFF) in Hong Kong in 2011. PUFF is an independently funded, indie film festival. Wong works to promote independent cinema in Hong Kong and throughout China. The festival includes a side feature, Secret Cinema, which takes the films from the film festival to Shanghai. PUFF selects feature films, shorts and documentaries that would otherwise not be distributed in Hong Kong.

The first festival featured films from Canada, the United States, Greece, Italy, and China, as well as Iran, Brazil, Taiwan, Norway, and Spain. The initial festival featured 26 films, and was up to 76 films by 2013. The 9th edition was held at Eaton KINO in Hong Kong and the 10th edition was held online in 2020.

=== Experimenta ===
Wong is also curator and co-founder of Experimenta a digital media and performance art space in Hong Kong since 2008. The space is located on 95 Hollywood Road, Hong Kong. The space features a projection screen and rows of wooden chairs for showing experimental cinema.

Experimenta has hosted exhibitions of artists including João Vasco Paiva, Nadim Abbas, Susanne Buerner, Lam Hoi Sin, and Ho Sin Tung. In 2013, Wong co-produced a video art exhibition "The Personal and the Political" with Lam Hoi Sin.

In 2016, in an interview with the journalist Bonnie Engel, Wong said the art space curated "Six Ways to the Senses" at the Central Academy of Fine Arts Museum in Beijing. Experimenta presented a 6-day public program at Art Central 2016. SCREEN X Experimenta consisted of three themes: World Drama, Poetry and Stage.

The Experimenta Book (2009-2016) was published in 2016.

=== Para/Site Art Space ===
Wong was on the board of Para/Site Art Space from 2003 to 2009. Wong created Para/Site Art Space's Curatorial Training Program (2007–2010) with funding from the Hong Kong Jockey Club Charities Trust.

== Filmography ==
- 2009 Shanghai Saga: Other Skies, Other Lands – Short film. Director.
- 2010 Orient Top Town – Feature Film, Director
- 2013 The Personal and the Political – Video art installations, Director
- 2015 The Road to Day Dream Mine – Short film, Director
- 2016 La Salamanda – Feature Film, Producer
- 2016 Papagajka – Associate producer
- 2019 Circus of Books – Co Producer
