= Funny Story (film) =

- Film poster
- Directed by: Michael J. Gallagher
- Written by: Michael J. Gallagher; Steve Greene
- Produced by: Michael J. Gallagher; Jana Winternitz; Michael Wormser
- Starring: Matthew Glave; Emily Bett Rickards; Jana Winternitz
- Cinematography: Greg Cotten
- Edited by: Brian Ufberg
- Music by: Brandon Campbell
- Production company: Cinemand
- Distributed by: Blue Fox Entertainment
- Release date: January 21, 2018 (Slamdance)
- Running time: 87 minutes
- Country: United States
- Language: English

Funny Story is a 2018 tragicomedy film, directed by Michael J. Gallagher and co-written by Gallagher and Steve Greene. It stars Matthew Glave, Emily Bett Rickards and Jana Winternitz. The film premiered as an official selection at the 2018 Slamdance Film Festival on January 21, 2018.

== Plot ==
Aging TV star Walter Campbell's attempts to break up with younger girlfriend Lucy are thwarted by the announcement of her pregnancy. Looking for space, Walter resolves to visit his estranged daughter Nic, currently residing in Big Sur, resentful of her father's neglectful parenting and womanizing ways. He agrees to give a lift to Nic's friend Kim, who having recently attended the funeral of her estranged mother, is dealing with her own emotional baggage.

Upon arriving in Big Sur, Walter discovers that Nic is living on a lesbian commune, and is in fact due to get married. Nic is appreciative of Walter's acceptance of her sexuality, which sees the pair's relationship begin to repair, but this newly formed bond is at risk of being destroyed once and for all.

== Cast ==
- Matthew Glave as Walter Campbell
- Emily Bett Rickards as Kim
- Jana Winternitz as Nic
- Nikki Limo as Brian
- Lily Holleman as Moon
- Jessica Diggins as Paula
- Aschleigh Jensen as Tamara
- Pete Gardner as Jack
- Jacob Wysocki as Tyler
- Daisye Tutor as Lucy
- Reginald VelJohnson as Hank
- Ceciley Jenkins as Mrs Butterwen
- Jamie Costa as a Waiter
- Jason Horton as Moderator

Co-writer Steve Greene appears in a cameo during the film, dressed as an alien centaur, during scenes featuring the character of Walter's fictional television series.

== Production ==
=== Development ===
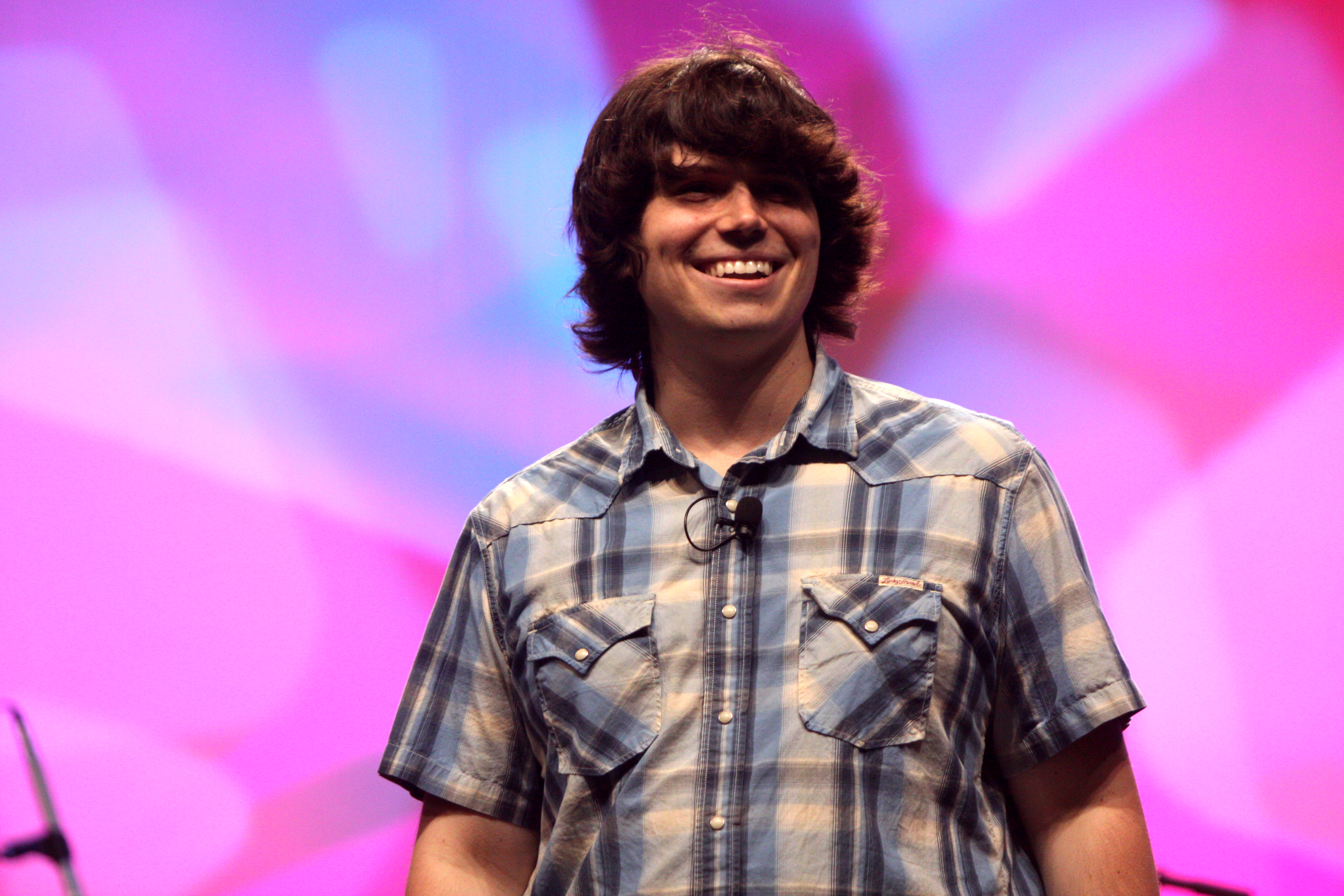
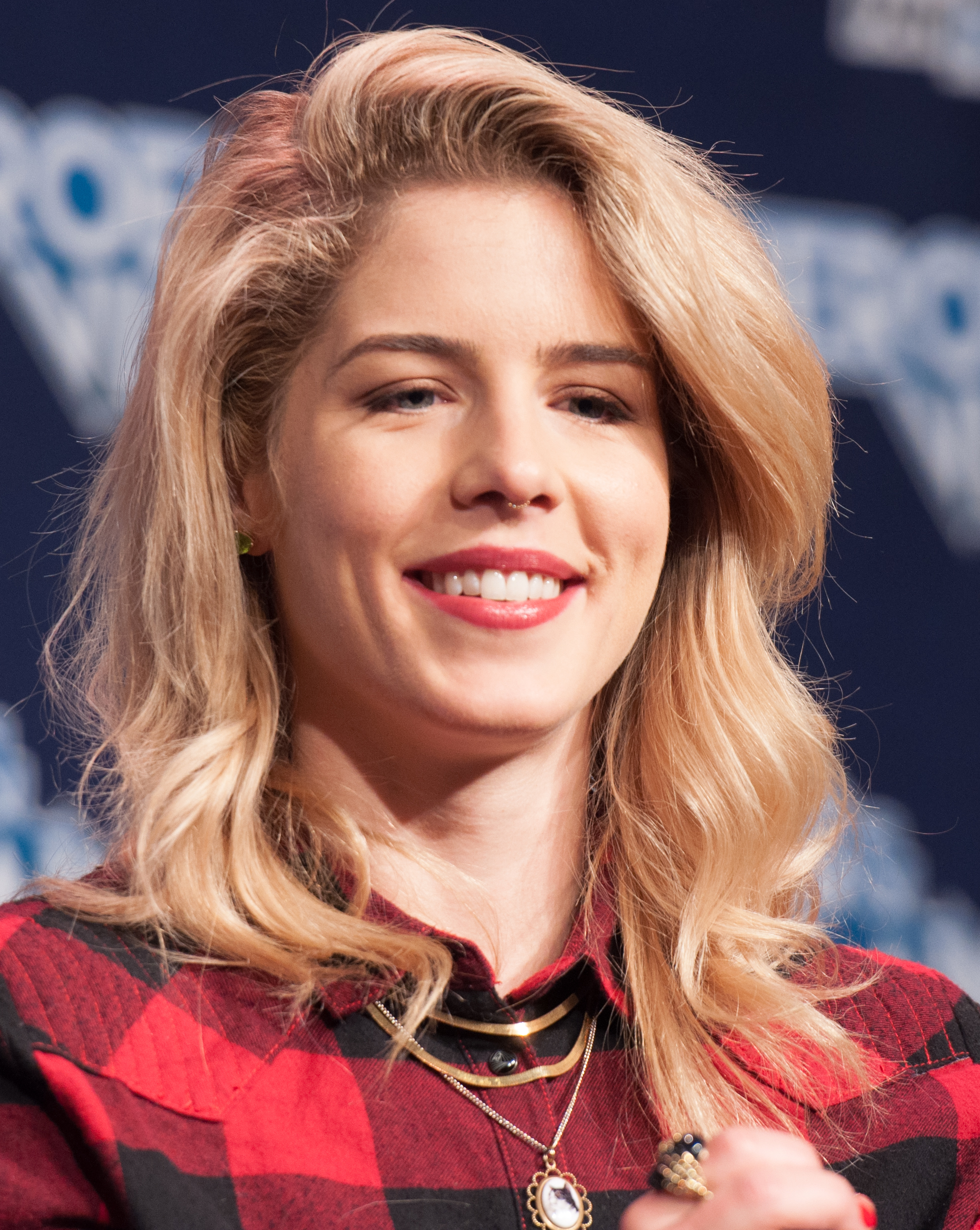
Michael J. Gallagher (left) directs and Emily Bett Rickards (right) stars in the film

Gallagher and writing partner Steve Greene began developing the project in 2015. Having previously worked heavily on genre-based projects, the pair wanted to develop a fictional story that drew more deeply upon the experiences and feelings of themselves and of people in their lives. Talking about his motivations for developing the film, Gallagher stated: "I wanted to make a film about forgiveness. Can we forgive someone who has truly wronged us? Or is their wrong doing just a matter of our myopic perspective? ..... I wanted to tell a grown-up story about people who behave in childish ways".

Initially struggling to find a production company willing to finance the film, by 2017, the success of Gallagher and Winterniz's production company Cinemand enabled them to finance the feature independently.

=== Casting ===
The part of Nic was specifically written with Winternitz in mind. On casting Glave, Gallagher noted that it took some time to find the right actor for the part of Walter and that he was looking for "someone who could be charming, oblivious, deeply narcissistic-- but deep down have a good heart". With regard to casting Rickards as Kim, he stated: "I knew that by casting Emily, when Kim made tough choices, the audience could see that deep down she is a good person who is just lost at this moment in time".

=== Filming ===
Filming took place in Los Angeles, California, in June 2017 and on location at Topanga Canyon and Big Sur. The film was shot in its entirety over 15 days. Director Gallagher took the decision to shoot the whole film with a wide-angle lens, something he believed benefited the comedic nature of the film and showcased the actors' interactions, as it was "fun to let them breathe and experience the awkwardness of being stuck in this shot together".

== Release ==
The film premiered as an official selection at the 2018 Slamdance Film Festival, as part of the festival's 'Beyond Program', with director Gallagher and the cast in attendance. The film was the runner-up in the festival's Audience Award for Beyond Feature.

The film was also featured as a special presentation at the San Luis Obispo International Film Festival, and was an official selection at the Omaha Film Festival, the Sonoma International Film Festival, where it was awarded the Stolman Audience Award for Best American Indie, the OUT Shine Festival in Miami and the Vero Beach Wine and Film Festival in Florida, where the film won the Audience Award for Best Narrative Feature. It made its European premiere at the Lucca Film Festival in Italy, in April 2018 and was an official selection at the Santorini Film Festival in Greece in June 2018, where it won Best Feature Film. It was also awarded the Grand Jury Prize for Narrative Feature at the Barcelona Film Festival. The film premiered in New York in July 2018 as an official selection at the Stony Brook Film Festival and premiered in New England in the same month as an official selection at the Woods Hole Film Festival where it won the Jury Prize for Best Narrative Feature, Comedy. In August, the film screened as an official selection at the 2018 Rhode Island International Film Festival where it won first prize in the Alternative Spirit Award (Feature) category.

The film made its Canadian premiere at the Cinéfest Sudbury International Film Festival in Ontario in September 2018 and premiered in the UK at the Southampton International Film Festival in October 2018, where it won the award for Best Feature Screenplay and Best Actor for Matthew Glave. In October of the same year, it featured as the opening film at the Evolution Mallorca International Film Festival.

The film went on a limited theatrical release on May 24, 2019, and was made available for digital download from the same date.

== Reception ==
The film garnered mainly positive reviews following its film festival screenings. Danielle Solzman of Cultured Vultures noted the strong ensemble of female characters in the film, and in particular felt Rickards delivered "the performance of a lifetime". Stephen Saito of The Movable Feast praised the command of language in Gallagher and Greene's script, as well as the performances of Glave and Rickards, noting how both "impressively toe the line between blustery self-regard and the vulnerability it hides as Walter and Kim". Similarly, Kimberley Pierce of Geek Girl Authority noted how much of the film's success hinged on the strong performances of the cast, in particular Glave, who "singlehandedly dictates the comedic tone of the movie" and Rickards, who "seems to hone in on the inherent conflict within Kimberly". Writing for Film Threat, Anthony Ray Bench praised the cast's performances, in particular those of Glave and Rickards, citing the film's "dry sense of humor that the actors execute perfectly". However, he was disappointed with the film's ending, and felt that it "set itself up for so much potential drama,...and instead it all just sort of peters out". Mark Kelly of Cinemaslice praised the character development throughout the movie, and how this made "the plot twists and heavy emotional moments later on in the film feel that much more impactful". Luca Ciccioni of Anonima Cinefili praised Gallagher's accomplished filming, photography and editing. Writing for the Great Lakes-based magazine The Review, Robert E Martin described the film as being "Filled with memorable characters and top-notch performances".

On review aggregator website Rotten Tomatoes, the film holds an approval rating of 83% based on 18 reviews, with an average rating of 6.9/10. Metacritic, using a weighted average, gave the film 57/100 based on five reviews, summarized as a mixed or average rating.

== Awards and nominations ==
Award / Film Festival	Category	Result	Ref
Slamdance Film Festival	Audience Award for Beyond Feature	Runner-up	
Sonoma International Film Festival	Stolman Audience Award for Best American Indie	Won	
Lucca Film Festival	International Feature Film - Best Film	Nominated	
Vero Beach Wine and Film Festival	Audience Award - Narrative Feature	Won	
Santorini Film Festival	Best Feature Film	Won	
Barcelona Film Festival	Grand Jury Prize:Narrative Feature	Won	
Woods Hole Film Festival	Jury Prize:Best Narrative Feature, Comedy	Won	
Rhode Island International Film Festival	Alternative Spirit Award (Feature) First Prize	Won	
Breckenridge Festival of Film	Best of the Fest, Best Comedy Feature	Won	
Breckenridge Festival of Film	Best of the Fest, Best Actor (Matthew Glave)	Won	
Breckenridge Festival of Film	Best of the Fest, Best Screenplay	Won	
Breckenridge Festival of Film	Best of the Fest, Best Editing	Won	
Hell's Half Mile Film & Music Festival	Grand Jury Award, Best Feature Film	Won	
Santa Cruz Film Festival	Grand Jury Prize: Best Feature Film	Won	
Southampton International Film Festival	Best Feature Film	Nominated	
Southampton International Film Festival	Feature Screenplay	Won	
Southampton International Film Festival	Leading Actor in a Feature (Matthew Glave)	Won	
Southampton International Film Festival	Leading Actress in a Feature (Emily Bett Rickards)	Nominated	
Southampton International Film Festival	Cinematography in a Feature	Nominated	
Santa Monica Film Festival	Best Actor (Matthew Glave)	Won	
Santa Monica Film Festival	Best Director (Michael Gallagher)	Won	
Washington West Film Festival	Jury Award Best Feature Narrative	Won	
Washington West Film Festival	Jury Award Best Feature Narrative Director (Michael Gallagher)	Won	
Ojai Film Festival	Best Narrative Feature (Honorable Mention)	Won	
