= Buddy Cops =

2016 Hong Kong-Chinese film by Peter Chik

- Traditional Chinese: 刑警兄弟
- Hanyu Pinyin: Shén Shǒu Bā Dà
- Jyutping: San4 Sau4 Baa1 Daa2
- Directed by: Peter Tsi
- Produced by: Eric Tsang
- Starring: Bosco Wong; King Kong Li; Kate Tsui; Charmaine Fong
- Production companies: Sil-Metropole Organization; Huace Pictures (Tianjing); Shaw Brothers Studio; Shaw Brothers Pictures; Guangzhou Lianle Media; Huijun Entertainment
- Distributed by: Intercontinental Film Distributors; Huace Pictures (Tianjing) (China)
- Release dates: 21 April 2016 (Hong Kong); 22 April 2016 (China)
- Running time: 114 minutes (Hong Kong); 97 minutes (China)
- Countries: Hong Kong; China
- Languages: Cantonese; Mandarin
- Box office: CN¥3.17 million (China)

Buddy Cops, also known as Holy Beast Cops (Chinese: 刑警兄弟), is a 2016 action crime comedy film directed by Peter Chik and starring Bosco Wong, King Kong Li, Kate Tsui and Charmaine Fong. A Hong Kong-Chinese co-production, filming officially began on 2 April 2012 and wrapped up on 25 May 2012. The film was released on 21 April 2016 in Hong Kong and in China by Huace Pictures (Tianjing) on 22 April 2016.

== Synopsis ==
After the hot-tempered police detective Fei messes up yet another operation, he is transferred to a fictional department that houses all the useless staff the force couldn't sack. There he finds a new enemy in the mild-mannered desk officer Johnny, who loathes Fei's disregard for discipline. But when Fei's father and Johnny's mother coincidentally become an item, the new brothers must somehow learn to cohabit under the same roof and also work together to rescue Bessie from Mr. Hung.

== Cast ==
- Bosco Wong as Chan Kin-Fei
- King Kong Li as Johnny Li
- Charmaine Fong as Bessie Lo
- Kate Tsui as Petite Princess
- Stanley Fung as Philip Chan, Fei's father
- Elaine Jin as Giu, Johnny's mother
- Eric Tsang as Man Sir
- Candice Yu as Madam Chu
- Gordon Lam as Hung Cheng-Ting
- Jordan Chan as Lau Jing
- Lo Hoi-pang as Lo Hoi
- Alice Chan as policewoman
- Angela Tong as Mary
- James Ng as nerd
- Kaki Leung as policewoman
- Joe Junior as Mr Awesome
- Lo Mang as Mr Cool
- William Chak as policeman
- MC Jin as drug squad guy
- Lisa Cheng as Wolf girl
- Skye Chan Sin-Yeung as policewoman
- Sammy Sum Chun-Hin as Lo Hoi's crew
- Yao Bin as credit card Chiu
- Candy Yuen Ka-Man as reporter
- Jason Chan Chi-San as restaurant manager
- Lily Ho Ngo-Yi as couple
- Matthew Ko Kwan-Yin as policeman
- Vincent Lam as Crime squad head
- Akina Hong as First lady
- Kylie Weng Jia-Ni as Inspector
- Angus Chan Kwok-Jing as Inspector
- Edmond Siu Ka-Ho as Inspector
- Kau Cheuk-Nang as Inspector
- Moses Cheng Wing-Him as Inspector
- Calvin Chan Wai-Hung as Inspector
- Clayton Li as policeman
- Kim Lee Wai-Kin as policeman
- Andy Lau Tin-Lung as policeman
- Law Ho-Ming as subordinate
- Window Tsang Hoi-Cheong as subordinate
- Alan Tam Kwan-Lun as subordinate
- Mark Ma Kun-Tung as subordinate
- Wong Fung-King as tea lady
- Kong Foo-Keungas gang mate
- Wong Wai-Tong as gang mate
- Ronald Law Kwan-Moon as Lo Hoi's crew
- Jack Hui Ka-Kit as Lo Hoi's crew
- Sammi Cheung Sau-Man as Candy
- Penny Chan Kwok-Fung as couple
- Yeung Sau-Wai as couple
- Bella Lam Wing-Tung as waitress
- Rocky Cheng Kin-Lok as security guard
- Alan Wan Ka-Wai as security guard
- Lee Fung as leaflet distributor
- Michael Choi Hong-Nin as priest
- Ricky Yi Fan-Wai as supervisor
- Bob Lam as Chau Sir
- Kyle Cui as suspect
- Iris Tse Ching-Ting as MC
- Hyman Chu Hei-Man as actress
- Bryan Sheh Kit-Wah as chubby boy
- Tsang Yuk-Kuen as boy's mum
- Poon Koon-Lam as boy's auntie
- Otto Wong Chi-On as security guard
- Eddie Pang Wai-On as security guard
- Jacky Lee Sin-Hang as policeman
- Eddy Law Tin-Chi as CID inspector
- Tai Yiu-Ming as Chicken Wah

== Reception ==
The film grossed CN¥29.38 million in China.
