= Jennifer Tse =

Hong Kong actress (born 1982)

- 謝婷婷
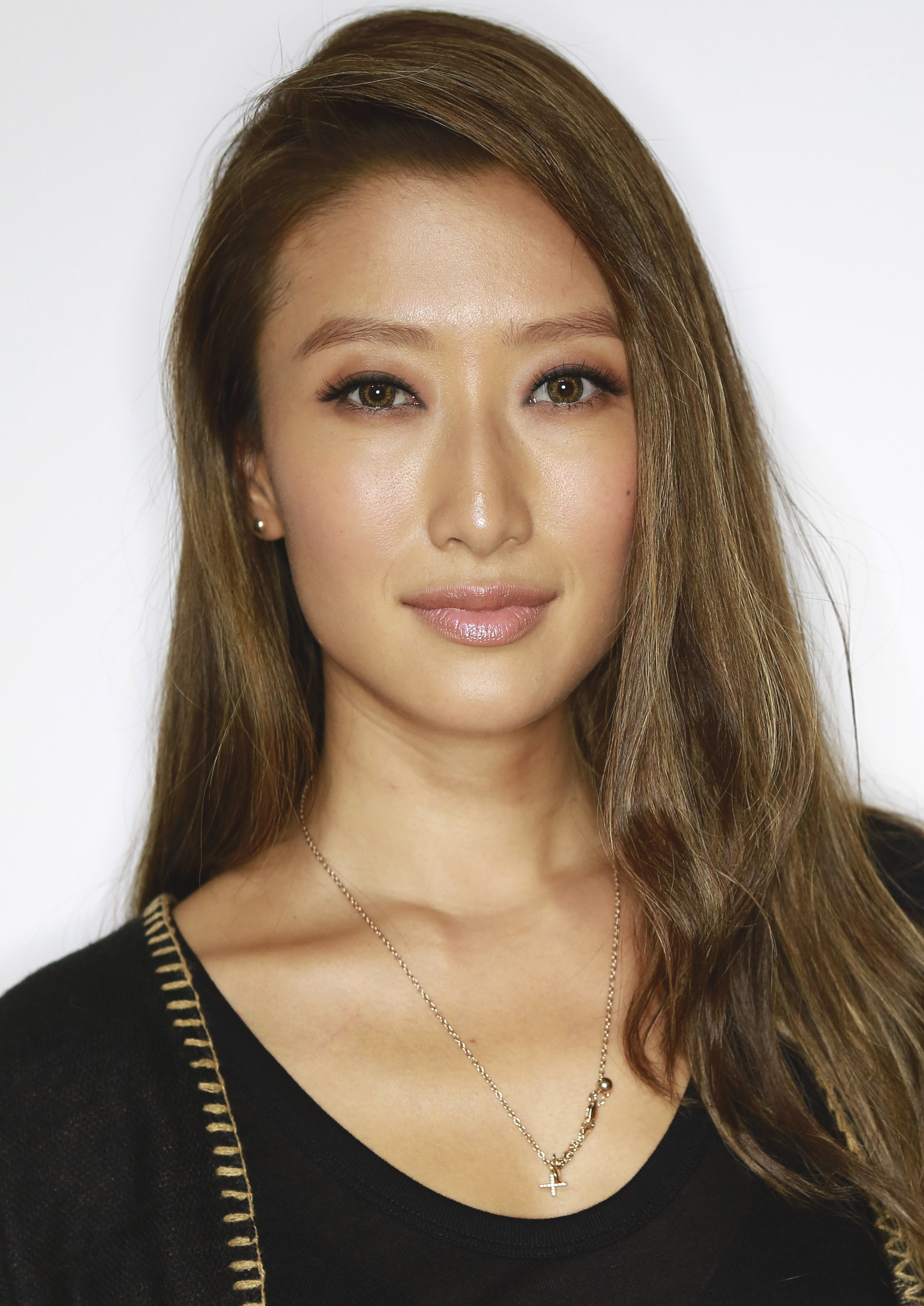
- Tse in 2014
- Born: Tse Ting-ting; 7 September 1982 (age 44); British Hong Kong
- Education: University of British Columbia
- Occupations: Actress; model
- Years active: 2010–present
- Partner(s): Andy On (2009–2013); Sean Lee-Davies (2014–2015)
- Children: 2
- Parent(s): Patrick Tse (father); Deborah Lee (mother)
- Relatives: Nicholas Tse (brother)
- Modeling information
- Height: 1.75 m (5 ft 9 in)
- Hair color: Black
- Eye color: Dark brown

Chinese name
- Traditional Chinese: 謝婷婷
- Simplified Chinese: 谢婷婷
Transcriptions
Standard Mandarin
- Hanyu Pinyin: Xiè Tíngtíng
Yue: Cantonese
- Jyutping: Ze6 Ting4ting4
- Website: jennifertse.com

Jennifer Tse Ting-ting (simplified Chinese: 谢婷婷; traditional Chinese: 謝婷婷; pinyin: Xiè Tíngtíng; Jyutping: Ze6 Ting4ting4; born 7 September 1982) is a Hong Kong actress and model. She is the daughter of actors Patrick Tse and Deborah Lee, and the younger sister of singer and actor Nicholas Tse.

== Biography ==
Born on 7 September 1982 in British Hong Kong, she is the daughter of actors Patrick Tse and Deborah Lee. Her elder brother is singer and actor Nicholas Tse.

Tse is best known for her role in Bruce Lee, My Brother (2010), in which she played Pearl Tso, the love interest of Bruce Lee (portrayed by Aarif Lee). She also starred in the 2012 action film Naked Soldier, playing the daughter of a police officer who is kidnapped and trained as an assassin.

In Siddharta (2014), she portrayed Yaśodharā, the wife of Prince Siddhartha Gautama, opposite Ray Lui, who played the Buddha.

Tse earned a bachelor's degree in psychology from the University of British Columbia.

== Filmography ==
- Bruce Lee, My Brother (2010)
- Hong Kong Ghost Stories (2011)
- Naked Soldier (2012)
- Siddhartha (2014) - Yasodharā
- Knock Knock! Who's There? (有客到) (2015)
- Europe Raiders (2018)

== Personal life ==
Tse dated actor Andy On from 2009 to 2013 and television producer Sean Lee-Davies from 2014 to 2015.

By 3 June 2019, Tse had a baby daughter who was 100 days old; however, the identity of the father was not publicly known at the time. On 21 February 2020, it was reported that her daughter was named Sara on her first birthday.

When her father died on 16 July 2026, she was living with her partner, Matthew Milne, and their two children in Canada.
