= Jessica Cambensy =

American actor-model

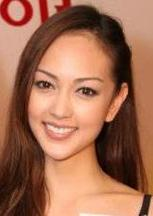
- Jessica Cambensy in 2012
- Born: Jessica Tess Cambensy; April 18, 1988 (age 38); Chicago, Illinois, U.S.
- Other name: JC
- Education: Columbia College Chicago
- Occupations: Actress, model
- Years active: 2011–present
- Spouse: Andy On (m. 2017)
- Children: Tessa Tien (daughter); Elvis Tien (son)
- Modeling information
- Height: 5 ft 7 in (1.70 m)
- Hair color: Black
- Eye color: Dark brown

Jessica Cambensy (born April 18, 1988), also known as Jessica C., is an American-born Hong Kong model and actress.

== Background ==
She is half white and half Filipino Chinese from Chicago. According to her portfolio web page she is last known to be modeling with Model One agency based in Hong Kong.

== Personal life ==
Cambensy met Andy On and started dating in November 2014. In October 2015, she announced that her boyfriend had successfully proposed marriage and that she was three months pregnant. On March 23, 2016, their first daughter was born.

Cambensy and On were married in Hawaii on 16 October 2017, and on December 24 of the same year, she announced her pregnancy on Instagram. She later gave birth to a son on 19 June 2018.

== Filmography ==
=== Film ===
Year	English title	Chinese title	Role	Notes
2011	Beach Spike	熱浪球愛戰	Natalie	
2012	Double Trouble	寶島雙雄	Treasure Thief V	
2014	Zombie Fight Club	活屍競技場	Jenny	
2015	S for Sex, S for Secret	小姐誘心		
2016	Racing Brothers vs. Zombie Teddy Boy			
2016	Special Female Force		Jessica	
