= Andy On =

American actor

- 安志杰
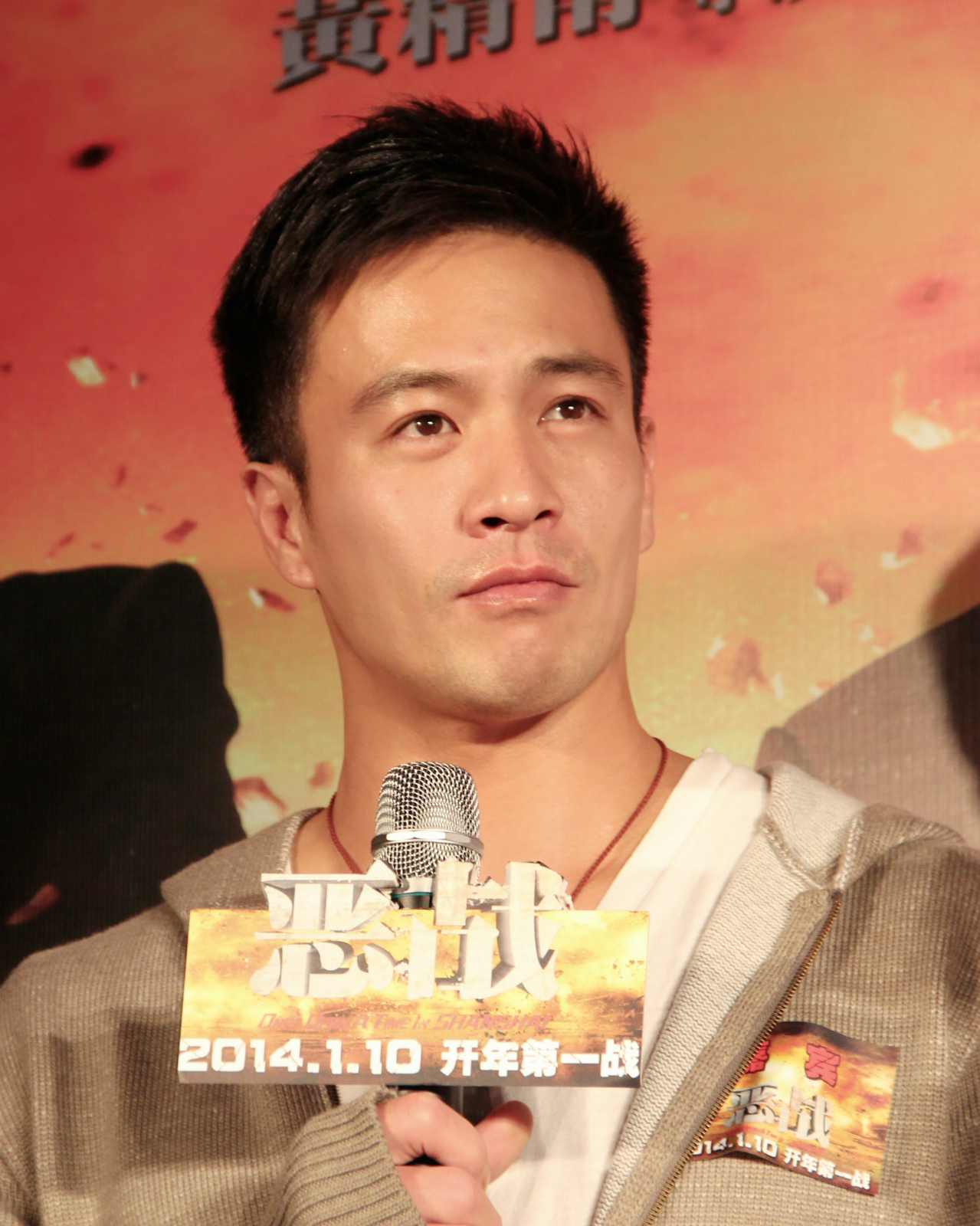
- On in 2014
- Born: Andy Tien; May 11, 1977 (age 49); Providence, Rhode Island, U.S.
- Occupations: Actor, martial artist
- Years active: 2002–present
- Spouse: Jessica Cambensy (m. 2017)
- Partners: Coco Lee (2002); Jennifer Tse (2009–2013)
- Children: 2
- Awards: Hong Kong Film Awards –: Best New Performer; 2004 Star Runner

Chinese name
- Traditional Chinese: 安志杰
- Simplified Chinese: 安志杰
Transcriptions
Standard Mandarin
- Hanyu Pinyin: Ān Zhìjié
Yue: Cantonese
- Jyutping: On^{1} Zi^{3} Git^{6}

Andy On Chi-kit (Chinese: 安志杰; pinyin: Ān Zhìjié, né Andy Tien; May 11, 1977) is an American actor and martial artist, known for his work in Hong Kong action cinema. He won the Hong Kong Film Award for Best New Performer for his role in Star Runner (2003).

== Early life ==
On was born to Taiwanese and Hong Kong parents on May 11, 1977, in Providence, Rhode Island. His mother was a Taiwanese Mandopop singer. After dropping out of high school, On worked as a bartender, before moving to Hong Kong.

On's native languages are English and Mandarin, and he also speaks some Cantonese from his years living in Hong Kong.

== Career ==
While in Hong Kong, On was approached by China Star founder Charles Heung and filmmaker Tsui Hark to take over the role of one of Jet Li's film characters, Black Mask, in Black Mask 2: City of Masks (2002), despite having no martial arts or acting background. Tsui sent On to the Shaolin Temple one month for training. He even received some guidance from Jet Li himself. Despite the poor reviews and the bad box office ratings, On continued to act, improving in both martial arts and acting. Like fellow Hong Kong film star Nicholas Tse, On trained in martial arts under Chung Chi Li, the leader of the Jackie Chan Stunt Team. On began training with Chan in 2001 for the film Looking for Mister Perfect/Kei fung dik sau (2003), which was released two years later. On trained in wushu at the Shaolin Temple and studied film fighting under former Jackie Chan Stunt Team leader Nicky Li for his first film, Looking for Mister Perfect, which was shot before Black Mask 2: City of Masks, but released one year later, in 2003. On continued his acting career with many injuries, sustaining a hamstring injury on the set of New Police Story (2004) in one of the two fights against Jackie Chan.

On was nominated and won the Hong Kong Film Award for Best New Actor Award for his role in Star Runner/Siu nin a Fu (2003). He shared the screen with the man who influenced him, Jackie Chan, in New Police Story. On has also won the Best New Artist Award in 2004 at the Hong Kong Film Awards for his role as Tank Wong in Siu nin a Fu, beating favorite Vanness Wu by only one-tenth of the votes.

Aside from his filmmaking career, On is also a singer. He has released some tracks, including a duet with Taiwanese pop singer Jolin Tsai called "Angel of Love". His hobbies are martial arts and video games. He continues to train in Wing Chun Kung Fu with good friend, actor, and martial artist Philip Ng, and has studied Thai boxing under former world kickboxing champion and actor Billy Chau in preparation for Star Runner.

During production of the film Three Kingdoms: Resurrection of the Dragon (2008), On was hit in the face by a stuntman during an action sequence. On cut his lip, and, after seven surgeries, sports a small scar on his lip. He considers the scar a "trophy" of his hard work in the film.

== Personal life ==
On had a short-lived relationship with Coco Lee in which first started in June 2002. On dated model and actress Jennifer Tse from 2009 to 2013 before breaking up.

During the filming of Zombie Fight Club, On met actress Jessica Cambensy. The two began dating in November 2014. On and Cambensy married on October 15, 2017, in a private ceremony in Hawaii. They have two children together.

== Filmography ==
Year	Title	Role	Notes/Ref.
2002	Black Mask 2: City of Masks	Black Mask	
2003	Looking for Mister Perfect	Alex	
2003	Star Runner	Tank Wong	Hong Kong Film Award for Best New Performer
2004	Itchy Heart	Wil	
2004	New Police Story	Law Tin-tin	
2004	The White Dragon	Second Prince Tian Yang	
2005	Dragon Squad	Suet's undercover target	
2006	Lethal Angels	Jet	
2006	Election 2	Lik	
2006	Dating a Vampire	Kit	
2006	Fatal Contact	Silver Dragon	
2006	Nothing Is Impossible	Jason	
2007	Invisible Target	Tien Yeng-yee	
2007	Mad Detective	Inspector Ho Ka-on	
2008	Three Kingdoms: Resurrection of the Dragon	Deng Zhi	
2008	Forgive and Forget	Andy	
2008	La Lingerie	Eugene	
2010	Black Ransom	Gundam	
2010	Bad Blood	Calf	
2010	True Legend	Yuan Lie	
2010	Shanghai	Yum	
2010	Crossing Hennessy	Xu	
2011	The Lost Bladesman		
2011	Mural		
2011	White Vengeance	Han Xin	
2012	The Viral Factor	Agent Sean Wong	
2012	Naked Soldier	Sam Wong	
2012	Cold War	SDU Commander Michael Shek	
2013	Unbeatable	Li Zitian	
2013	Special ID	Sunny	
2013	Angel Warriors		
2014	As the Light Goes Out		
2014	Once Upon a Time in Shanghai	Long Qi	
2014	That Demon Within	Ben Chan	
2014	Outcast	Shing	
2014	Zombie Fight Club	Andy	
2014	For Love or Money		
2015	Blackhat	Hong Kong Police Inspector Alex Trang	
2015	One Night Only		
2016	League of Gods	King Wu of Zhou	
2018	Kung Fu League	Huo Yuanjia	
2018	Ever Night	Chao Xiaoshu	
2019	Abduction	Connor	
2019	Undercover vs. Undercover	Xia Qiankun	
2019	Nezha		
2021	Assassins and the Missing Gold		
2021	The Hit		
2021	The Guardian		
2023	Ride On	Da Mi	
2023	100 Yards		
2023	One More Chance	Brother Rui	
2023	The Comeback	Ah Jie	
2023	Ever Victorious		
2024	The Grey Man	Tian Ge	
2024	Hunt the Wicked	Wei Yun-zhou	
2024	Cruel War		
2024	To Live Through Death	A Can	
2024	Fury 12 Hours		

== Videography ==
=== Music videos ===
- 2002 – Coco Lee ("有你就够了")
- 2004 – Miriam Yeung ("处处吻")
- 2004 – Miriam Yeung ("柳媚花娇")
