= João Vasco Paiva =

Portuguese artist (born 1979)

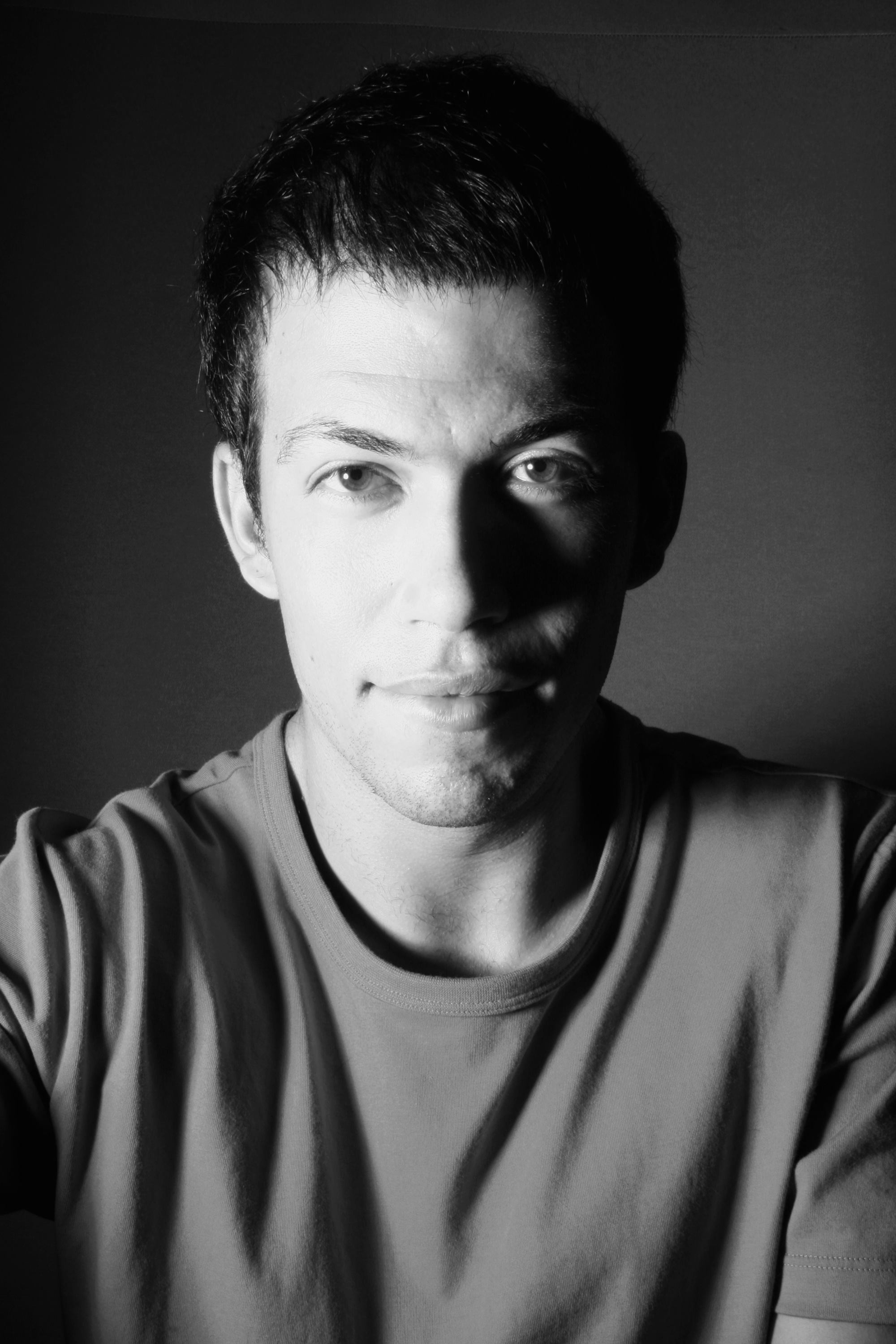

João Vasco Paiva (born 1979, Coimbra, Portugal) is a Portuguese contemporary artist. He is currently based in Hong Kong.

== Biography ==
João Vasco Paiva received a BFA from the Escola Superior Artistica do Porto in 2004 and an MFA in Creative Media from the City University of Hong Kong in 2008. He is the recipient of the Hong Kong Emerging Artist Grant and the Calouste Gulbenkian Foundation’s International Artist Support Grant amongst other awards, and has held residencies at Lichtenberg Studios, Berlin (2014) and Connecting Space, Zurich (2015).

Paiva is represented by Lehmann Contemporary and currently resides between Lisbon and Hong Kong.

== Work ==
Often contrasting the institutional space against the neglected urban space, Paiva addresses the notion of “non-places” as conceived by anthropologist Marc Augé, fleshing out the semantics each structure may possess. His practice involves systematically documenting, analysing and abstracting them to create a process-driven composition that is simultaneously an artwork, which ultimately explores how urban spaces may evoke aesthetic production as well as informative truths.

Though intrinsically tied to Hong Kong, Paiva’s work has been exhibited widely at the Witte de With, Rotterdam; Artsonje, Seoul; OCT Contemporary Art Terminal, Shanghai; Orient Foundation, Macau and Counter Space, Zurich amongst other locations.

In 2015, Paiva’s installation ‘Mausoleum’ (2015) – a towering composition of marketplace Styrofoam boxes cast in stone resin – was selected for the Encounters section of Art Basel Hong Kong. In 2015 to 2016, he presented ‘Unlimited’, a project and citywide installation in collaboration with Edouard Malingue Gallery at Media Art Asia Pacific in Brisbane. Other notable exhibitions in recent years include ‘Benches, Stairs, Ramps, Ledges, Ground’ in Jacob Lewis Gallery, New York (2016) and ‘CARGO’ at the National Museum of Contemporary Art Museu do Chiado, Lisbon (2016).

== Solo exhibitions ==
- 2016 – Benches, Stairs, Ramps, Ledges, Ground, Jacob Lewis Gallery, New York, USA
- 2016 – CARGO, National Museum of Contemporary Art Museu do Chiado, Lisbon, Portugal
- 2015 – Unlimited, Media Art Asia Pacific, Brisbane, Australia
- 2015 – Mausoleum, Encounters, Art Basel Hong Kong, Hong Kong
- 2015 – Counter Space, Zurich, Switzerland
- 2014 – Cast Away, Casa Garden – Orient Foundation, Macao
- 2013 – Near and Everywhere, Edouard Malingue Gallery, Hong Kong
- 2013 – Objects Encrypted, Goethe Institute, Hong Kong
- 2011 – Palimpseptic, Saamlung Gallery, Hong Kong
- 2011 – Forced Empathy – Anchored Monument I, Experiments, Hong Kong
- 2010 – Sea of Mountains, Para Site and Hanart TZ Gallery, Hong Kong
- 2010 – Experiments on the Notation of Shapes, Input Output Gallery, Hong Kong
- 2010 – Chirps, Fuses A.I.R., Videotage, Hong Kong
