= Joyce Godenzi =

Hong Kong former actress

- 高麗虹
- Born: 28 May 1965 (age 61); British Hong Kong
- Occupation: Former actress
- Years active: 1984–1991, 1997, 2010, 2013
- Spouses: Chan Chee Fah (m. 1992; div. 1994) Sammo Hung (m. 1995)

Chinese name
- Traditional Chinese: 高麗虹
- Simplified Chinese: 高丽虹
Transcriptions
Standard Mandarin
- Hanyu Pinyin: Gāo Lìhóng
Yue: Cantonese
- Jyutping: Gou1 Lai6 Hung4

Joyce Mina Godenzi (traditional Chinese: 高麗虹; simplified Chinese: 高丽虹; pinyin: Gāo Lìhóng; Jyutping: Gou1 Lai6 Hung4; born 28 May 1965) is a Hong Kong former actress and winner of the Miss Hong Kong pageant of 1984.

== Background ==
Born in British Hong Kong in 1965 to an Australian father and a Chinese mother, Godenzi was encouraged to join the Miss Hong Kong pageant by her modeling agency, which had groomed one of its models, Maggie Cheung, to compete the year before. Heavily favored, she won the title, in addition to the Miss Photogenic award. After her unsurprising victory, many expected her to do well in Miss Universe 1984 in Miami. She was unplaced eventually, but did win third prize in the national costume competition.

After her reign, Godenzi started a film career and was in several action films and appeared in several films alongside kung fu film actor Sammo Hung. She was nominated for Best Supporting Actress at the 1988 Hong Kong Film Awards for her role in Eastern Condors. Godenzi retired from acting in 1991.

== Personal life ==
After her retirement in 1991, she married service engineer Chan Chee Fah from Malaysia in 1992. They divorced in 1994 and Godenzi married Sammo Hung in 1995.

She is a Jehovah's Witness, having grown up attending services. She returned to the faith later in life and has written about her religious beliefs.

== Filmography ==
- The Seventh Curse (1986)
- Ghost Snatchers (1986)
- Eastern Condors (1987)
- Born to Gamble (1987)
- The Goofy Gang (a.k.a. The Gang Don't Shoot Straight) (1987)
- Spooky, Spooky (1988)
- Paper Marriage (1988)
- Angel Enforcers (1989)
- License To Steal (1990)
- She Shoots Straight (1990)
- Slickers Vs Killers (1991)
- Gambling Respect (1991)
- The Raid (1991)
- Mr. Nice Guy (1997)

Achievements
Preceded by Cher Yeung	Miss Hong Kong; 1984	Next: Shallin Tse
