= Hong Kong Ghost Stories =

2011 Hong Kong Cantonese horror film

- Film poster
- Directed by: Wong Jing; Patrick Kong
- Screenplay by: Wong Jing; Patrick Kong
- Produced by: Wong Jing
- Starring: Jennifer Tse; Chrissie Chau; Stephy Tang; Carol Yeung; Pakho Chau; Timmy Hung; Jacqueline Chong; Charmaine Fong; Harriet Yeung; Him Law
- Cinematography: William Chan Wai-Lin; O Sing-Pui; Ng King-Man
- Edited by: Li Ka-Wing
- Music by: Ben Chong Tung-Yan; Tang Chi-Wai
- Production company: Jing's Production Limited
- Release date: 27 October 2011 (Hong Kong)
- Running time: 97 minutes
- Country: Hong Kong
- Language: Cantonese

Hong Kong Ghost Stories (Chinese: 猛鬼愛情故事) is a 2011 Hong Kong horror film directed by Wong Jing and Patrick Kong.

== Cast ==
- Jennifer Tse as Ling
- Chrissie Chau as Bo
- Stephy Tang
- Carol Yeung
- Pakho Chau
- Timmy Hung
- Jacqueline Chong
- Charmaine Fong
- Harriet Yeung
- Him Law as Ka Ming
