= Charmaine Fong =

Hong Kong singer and actress (born 1980)

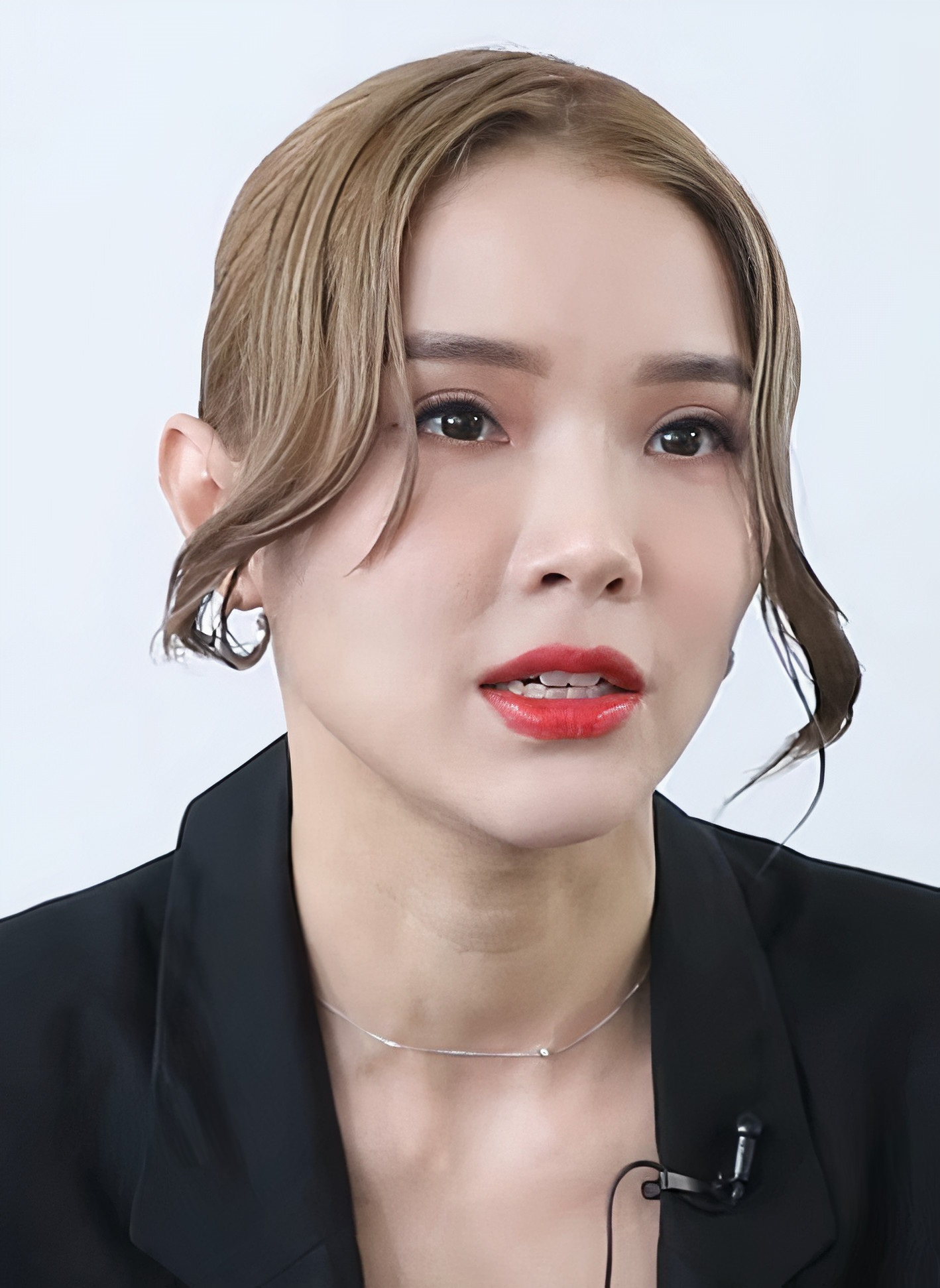
- Fong in an interview with am730
- Born: Ng Ka Yan 吳嘉欣; 1 May 1980 (age 46); British Hong Kong
- Occupations: Singer-songwriter; actress
- Spouse: Shingo Yasuda (m. 2017; div. 2021)
- Children: Luca Yasuda (b.2018)
- Musical career
- Origin: Hong Kong, China
- Genres: Cantopop

Charmaine Fong Ho-Man
- Chinese: 方皓玟
Transcriptions
Standard Mandarin
- Hanyu Pinyin: Fāng Hàomín
Yue: Cantonese
- Jyutping: fong1 hou6 man4

Ng Ka Yan
- Traditional Chinese: 吳嘉欣
- Simplified Chinese: 吴嘉欣
Transcriptions
Standard Mandarin
- Hanyu Pinyin: Wú Jiāxīn
Yue: Cantonese
- Jyutping: ng4 gaa1 jan1

Charmaine Fong Ho-man (Chinese: 方皓玟) is a Hong Kong Cantopop singer-songwriter and film actress.

In 2019, Fong released a new song "Explicit Content (人話)" which she composed. Its lyrics expressed her stance toward the anti-government protests explicitly. The music video of the song, made up of protest footage and scenes of police brutality, was highly popular upon release, the number of views exceeded 400 thousand by the second day of release. As it was rare for public figures to voice out their stance and opinions on political issues, citizens that support the social movement praised Fong as a true singer for Hong Kong.

In January 2022, local media reported that ten Canto-pop singers and groups had been put on a blacklist of government-funded broadcaster RTHK, with radio DJs having been ordered not to play their songs. Fong was reportedly on the list. In response to a letter by lawmaker Tik Chi-yuen requesting clarification, RTHK wrote: "RTHK has been supporting the development of Chinese pop music. Program hosts choose songs based on professionalism and suitability to the programs."

== Filmography ==
- Hooked on You (2007)
- Chaos (2008)
- Love Is Elsewhere (2008)
- The Sniper (2009)
- Just Another Pandora's Box (2010)
- Love in a Puff (2010)
- Marriage with a Liar (2010)
- Hong Kong Ghost Stories (2011)
- Love Is the Only Answer (2011)
- The Bounty (2012)
- Love in Late Autumn (2016)
- Buddy Cops (2016)
- Mad World (2016)

== Discography ==
- (2002) Do You Know
- (2003) Dreamcatcher (梦的捕手)
- (2006) Welcome (歡迎光臨)
- (2009) Unlock Me
- (2011) Charmaine Fong New + Best Selection (方皓玟 (新曲+精選)
- (2011) Dun U Dare (EP)
- (2014) 404 Not Found
- (2017) My Spiritual Life
- (2021) LOST n FOUND

== Television ==
- Super Trio series (series 8, episode 17; series 10, episode 1 and 10 (winner))
- Beautiful Cooking (2009, season 2, episode 23)

== See also ==
- Art of the 2019–20 Hong Kong protests
