= Emily Bett Rickards =

Canadian actress (born 1991)

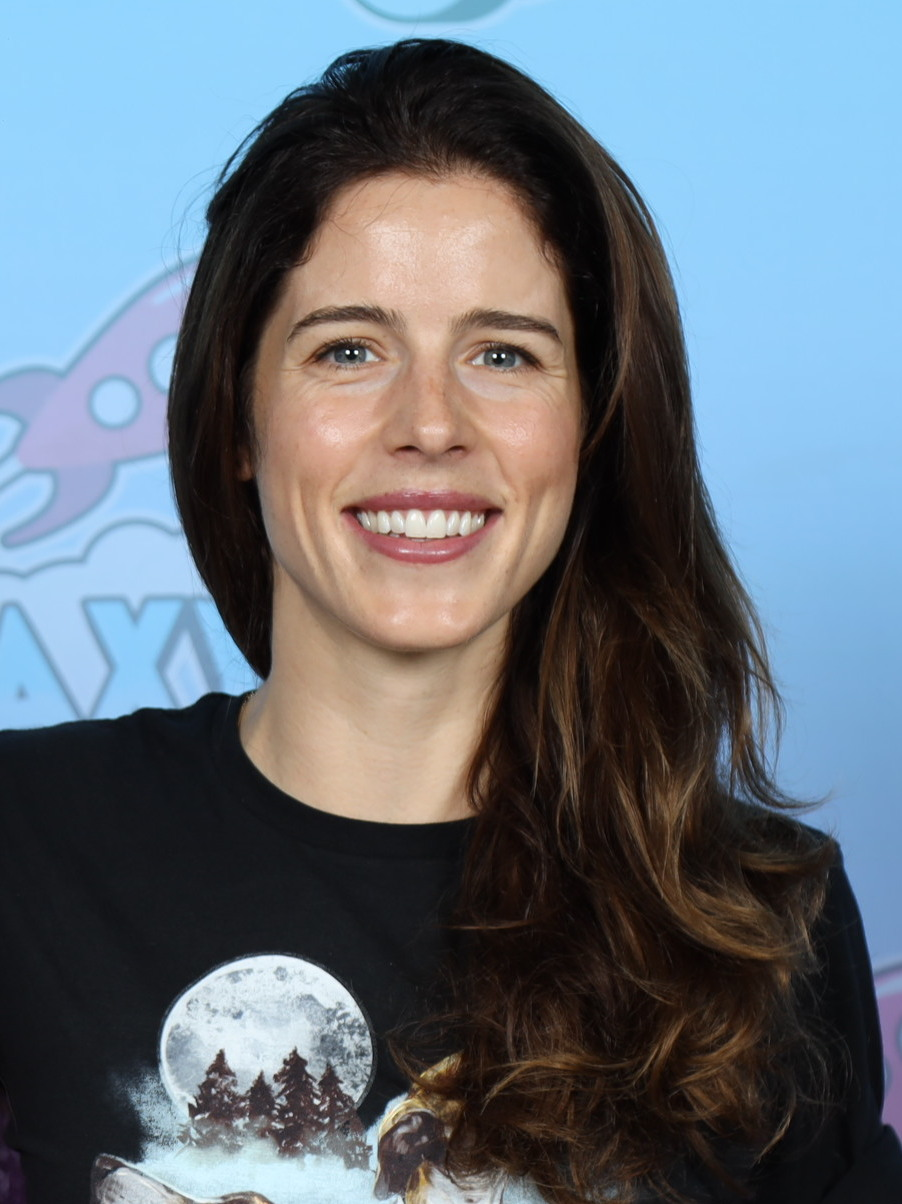
- Rickards at the GalaxyCon Austin convention in 2023
- Born: July 24, 1991 (age 35); Vancouver, British Columbia, Canada
- Occupation: Actress
- Years active: 2009–present
- Spouse: Riley Howlett (m. 2026)

Signature
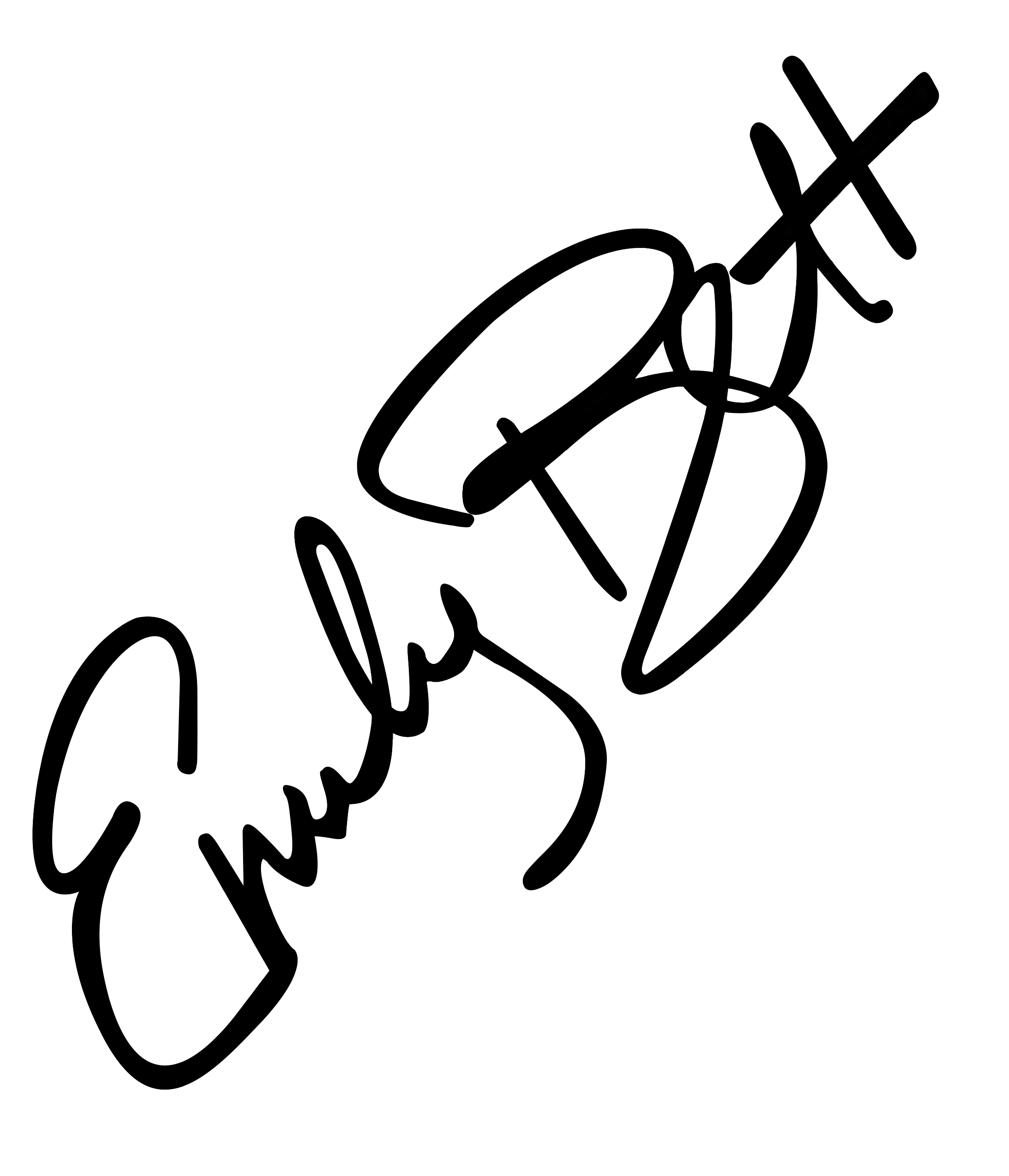

Emily Bett Rickards (born July 24, 1991) is a Canadian actress. She is known for her role as Felicity Smoak on The CW series Arrow, her first television credit. She reprised the role in the Arrowverse shows The Flash, Legends of Tomorrow and Supergirl and voiced the character on the animated web series Vixen.

== Early life and career ==
Rickards was born and raised in British Columbia. Her mother is Dr. Diane Greig, a dream psychotherapist in Vancouver.

At a young age, she was introduced to musical theatre and dance. Graduating early from high school, she attended the Vancouver Film School, completing their acting essentials program. Following completion, she attended an open call audition, gaining an agent. She studied at the Alida Vocal Studio in Vancouver. Rickards made her first professional appearance in 2009, starring in the video for the Nickelback single "Never Gonna Be Alone".

== Career ==
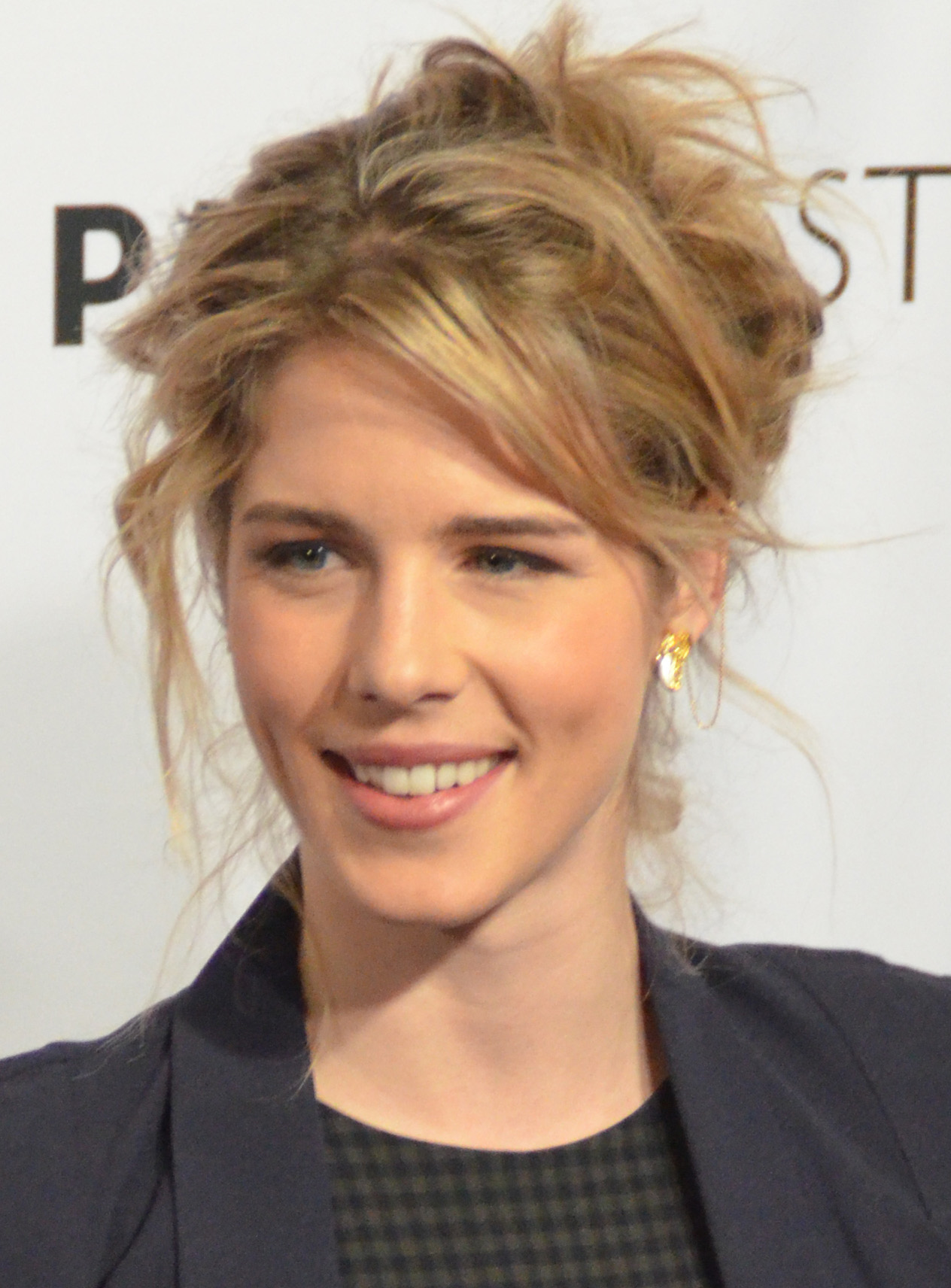
Rickards at PaleyFest in 2015

=== Arrowverse ===
Rickards' breakthrough role came in 2012 with her first television casting, as Felicity Smoak in The CW television series Arrow, which is based on the DC Comics character Green Arrow. She was initially signed as a guest star for one episode, but after positive reaction from star Stephen Amell, Warner Bros. executive Peter Roth, and journalists at preview screenings, she was signed as a recurring star for the rest of the show's first season. The success of the character saw her signed as a series regular from the second season onwards. Speaking in 2013 about that decision, Arrow executive producer Marc Guggenheim stated, "We were very lucky that we cast Emily Rickards, who just lit up the screen." Rickards left Arrow at the end of the show's seventh season, and returned as a guest star for the eighth and final season.

Throughout the series run, Rickards received praise for her performance in the role, often described as the show's "fan favourite" or "breakout" character, with many critics describing the character, and Rickards, as an integral part of the show's success. Her monologue in the season-six episode "We Fall" won her particular praise. Rickards was nominated for multiple Teen Choice and Leo Awards for the role, and in 2016, her portrayal of the character was placed at number 15 in a list of 50 Favourite Female Characters, in a poll of Hollywood professionals conducted by The Hollywood Reporter.

Rickards also portrayed the character in the spin-off shows to the series (collectively known as the Arrowverse) The Flash, Legends of Tomorrow and Supergirl, as well as providing the voice for the character on animated show Vixen. In 2013, she portrayed Felicity in web-based promotional tie-in series Blood Rush, sponsored by Bose, which also featured the characters of Roy Harper (Colton Haynes) and Quentin Lance (Paul Blackthorne).

=== Film ===
In March 2014, Rickards was cast in the sequel to Cowgirls 'n Angels, entitled Cowgirls 'n Angels: Dakota's Summer, as Kristen Rose, the sister of the film's protagonist, Dakota, portrayed by Haley Ramm. The film premiered at the 2014 Dallas International Film Festival. In 2015, she had a supporting role in the Oscar-nominated film Brooklyn. In 2016, she appeared in Slumber, starring alongside Darby Stanchfield and Meaghan Rath. Filming took place in Los Angeles in May 2016. She also appeared in Axis. The film won the prize for outstanding achievement feature film at the 2017 Newport Beach Film Festival. She also appeared in the super-hero themed short film Sidekick, directed by Arrowverse alum Jeff Cassidy.

In 2018, she appeared in the comedy, Funny Story. The film was runner-up at the Slamdance Film Festival in January 2018, in the festival's 'Beyond' programme. It also won the Stolman audience award for best American indie at the 2018 Sonoma International Film Festival; the audience award for best narrative feature at the Vero Beach Wine and Film Festival; best feature at the Santorini Film Festival; and the grand jury prize at the Barcelona Film Festival. At the Southampton International Film Festival, Rickards was nominated for leading actress in a feature. In May 2019, she appeared in the indie film, We Need to Talk, co-starring James Maslow, and written and directed by Todd Wolfe. It was an official selection at the FirstGlance Film Festival in Philadelphia, in November 2020 and Rickards was named best actress in a feature.

In 2024, Rickards reunited with Amell in the western Calamity Jane, a fictionalized story based around the life of Martha Jane Canary, known as Calamity Jane. She appeared in a French film, Autumn and the Black Jaguar, as supporting character and also appeared in Queen of the Ring, a biopic about female wrestler Mildred Burke, where she portrays the lead role.

=== Other works ===
In early 2016, she appeared in the Canadian webseries Paranormal Solutions, Inc., which was launched online in April of the same year. In June, she appeared in an episode of the fifth season of IFC comedy Comedy Bang! Bang!. In May 2018, she appeared in Reborning for Reality Curve Theatre Group at the Annex Theatre in Vancouver. The production premiered on June 20, 2018. In April 2019, she reprised her role in Reality Curve's Off-Broadway production at New York's SoHo Playhouse, in July and August of the same year. In September 2018, she narrated an audiobook of The Wicked Ones, originally published as part of the Ghosts of the Shadow Market anthology, which is also part of The Mortal Instruments series.

== Philanthropy ==
In 2016, Rickards launched a campaign to support the American Autoimmune Related Diseases Association (AARDA) by selling T-shirts through the crowdfunding merchandise site Represent.com.

During season four of Arrow, her character was shot and paralyzed from the waist down, then regained the ability to walk through the use of a prototype microchip. Rickards filmed a PSA with the Christopher and Dana Reeve Foundation advocating for advancements in the treatment of spinal injuries.

In February 2019, the Vancouver Film School announced the "Emily Bett Rickards Acting Scholarship", a partnership between the school and Rickards, to fund a full scholarship for the school's acting programs, as well as partial funding of $250,000 for other students. She will select the scholarship recipients.

== Personal life ==
In July 2026, Rickards married Riley Howlett.

== Filmography ==
=== Film ===
Year	Title	Role	Notes
2012	Bacon and Eggs	Dite	Short film
2012	Flicka: Country Pride	Mary Malone	Direct-to-video
2012	Random Acts of Romance	Young Wife	
2014	Dakota's Summer	Kristen Rose	
2015	Normal Doors	Meg	Short film
2015	Brooklyn	Patty McGuire	
2016	Sidekick	Emma / The Princess	Short film
2017	Axis	Caitlin	Voice
2018	Funny Story	Kim	
2018	The Clinic	Stevens	
2020	We Need to Talk	Amber	
2024	Autumn and the Black Jaguar	Anja Shymore	
2024	Calamity Jane	Calamity Jane	
2024	Queen of the Ring	Mildred Burke	

=== Television ===
Year	Title	Role	Notes
2012–2020	Arrow	Felicity Smoak / Overwatch	Recurring role (season 1), main role (seasons 2–7), special guest role (season 8)
2013	Romeo Killer: The Chris Porco Story	Lauren Phillips	Television film
2014–2017	The Flash	Felicity Smoak	Recurring role, 8 episodes
2016–2017	Legends of Tomorrow	Felicity Smoak	Recurring role, 4 episodes
2016	Comedy Bang! Bang!	Becky Simmons	Episode: "Joe Jonas Wears a Maroon and Gold Letterman Jacket with White Sneakers"
2016	Whose Line Is It Anyway?	Herself	Episode: "Emily Bett Rickards"
2016	Superhero Fight Club 2.0	Felicity Smoak	Short promo video
2017	Supergirl	Felicity Smoak	Episode: "Crisis on Earth-X, Part 1"

=== Web ===
Year	Title	Role	Notes
2013	Soldiers of the Apocalypse	Forty	Main role, 8 episodes
2013	Blood Rush	Felicity Smoak	Main role, 6 episodes
2015	Very Mallory	Herself	Voice; episode: "Emily Bett Rickards"
2015–2016	Vixen	Felicity Smoak	Voice; 2 episodes
2016	Paranormal Solutions Inc.	Genevieve Kreme	8 episodes

=== Music videos ===
Year	Title	Role	Artist	Ref.
2009	"Never Gonna Be Alone"	Woman	Nickelback	
2017	"Sunday Morning"	Herself	Herself and Travis Atreo	

== Stage ==
Year	Title	Role	Venue	Ref.
2018	Reborning	Kelly	Annex Theatre, Vancouver	
2019	Reborning	Kelly	SoHo Playhouse, New York	

== Discography ==
Year	Title	Role	Notes
2018	The Wicked Ones	Narrator	Audiobook; part of The Mortal Instruments series.

== Awards and nominations ==
=== Film ===
Year	Nominated work	Award	Category	Result	Refs
2018	Funny Story	Southampton International Film Festival	Leading Actress in a Feature	Nominated	
2020	We Need To Talk	FirstGlance Film Festival Philadelphia	Best Actress (Feature Film)	Won	
2020	We Need To Talk	FirstGlance Film Festival Philadelphia	Best Ensemble Cast (Feature)	Won	
2024	Queen of the Ring	Fort Lauderdale International Film Festival	Star on the Horizon Award	Won	

=== Television ===
Year	Nominated work	Award	Category	Result	Refs
2013	Arrow	UBCP/ACTRA Awards	Best Newcomer	Nominated	
2014	Arrow	Leo Awards	Best Lead Performance by a Female in a Dramatic Series	Nominated	
2014	Arrow	Teen Choice Awards	Female Breakout Star	Nominated	
2015	The Flash	Leo Awards	Best Guest Performance by a Female in a Dramatic Series	Nominated	
2015	Arrow	Leo Awards	Best Lead Performance by a Female in a Dramatic Series	Nominated	
2015	Arrow	MTV Fandom Awards	Ship of the Year (with Stephen Amell)	Won	
2015	Arrow	Teen Choice Awards	Choice TV Actress – Fantasy/Sci-Fi	Nominated	
2015	Arrow	Teen Choice Awards	Choice TV Liplock (with Stephen Amell)	Nominated	
2016	Arrow	Leo Awards	Best Lead Performance by a Female in a Dramatic Series	Nominated	
2016	Arrow	MTV Fandom Awards	Ship of the Year (with Stephen Amell)	Won	
2016	Arrow	Teen Choice Awards	Choice TV Actress – Fantasy/Sci-Fi	Nominated	
2016	Arrow	Teen Choice Awards	Choice TV Liplock (with Stephen Amell)	Nominated	
2017	Arrow	Leo Awards	Best Lead Performance by a Female in a Dramatic Series	Nominated	
2017	Arrow	Teen Choice Awards	Choice TV Actress – Action	Nominated	
2018	Arrow	Teen Choice Awards	Choice TV Actress – Action	Nominated	
2018	Arrow	Teen Choice Awards	Choice TV Ship (with Stephen Amell)	Nominated	
2019	Arrow	Teen Choice Awards	Choice TV Actress – Action	Nominated	
