= List of animated feature films of 2008 =

This is a list of animated feature films first released in 2008.

== List ==
Title	Country	Director	Production company	Animation technique	Type	Notes	Release date	Duration
$9.99	Australia	Tatia Rosenthal	Film Finance Corporation Australia; Israel Film Fund yes Keshet International; New South Wales Film & Television Office; Crossfield; Sherman Pictures; Lama Films	Stop motion			September 4, 2008 (Toronto)	78 minutes
31 minutos, la película	Chile; Brazil	Álvaro Díaz; Pedro Peirano	Aplaplac; MGP Filmes; Total Entertainment LG; User T-38	Puppetry			March 27, 2008 (Chile); August 3, 2012 (Brazil)	83 minutes
The Adventures of Alyonushka and Yeryoma; Приключения Аленушки и Ерёмы (Priklyucheniya Alyonushki i Yeryomy)	Russia	Georgi Gitis	Paradise	Computer			November 29, 2008	93 minutes
The carnivore crisis	Spain	Pedro Rivero	DRAX audio	Flash			October 8, 2007 (Sitges Film Festival); May 16, 2008	78 minutes
Let's Go! Anpanman: The Secret of Fairy Linlin (それいけ!アンパンマン 妖精リンリンのひみつ)	Japan	Akinori Nagaoka	Anpanman Production Committee; TMS Entertainment	Traditional			July 12, 2008	52 minutes
Até ao Tecto do Mundo	Portugal	Carlos Silva; Costa Valente; Vítor Lopes		Traditional			June 2, 2008 (Zlín Film Festival)	74 minutes
Barbie & the Diamond Castle	United States; Canada	Gino Nichele	Mattel Entertainment; Rainmaker Entertainment	Computer	Direct-to-video		September 7, 2008 (Nickelodeon); September 9, 2008 (DVD)	79 minutes
Barbie in a Christmas Carol	United States; Canada	William Lau	Mattel Entertainment; Rainmaker Entertainment	Computer	Direct-to-video		November 4, 2008	76 minutes
Barbie: Mariposa and Her Butterfly Fairy Friends	United States	Conrad Helten	Mattel Entertainment; Rainmaker Entertainment	Computer	Direct-to-video		February 26, 2008	75 minutes (United States); 85 minutes (Argentina)
Batman: Gotham Knight	United States; Japan	Toshi Hiruma; Bruce Timm	Warner Bros. Animation	Traditional	Direct-to-video		July 8, 2008	76 minutes
Bleach: Fade to Black; BLEACH Fade to Black 君の名を呼ぶ (Burīchi Fade to Black Kimi no Na o Yobu)	Japan	Noriyuki Abe	Studio Pierrot	Traditional			December 13, 2008	95 minutes
Bolt	United States	Chris Williams; Byron Howard	Walt Disney Animation Studios	Computer			November 21, 2008	96 minutes
Bratz Babyz Save Christmas	United States	Phil Weinstein; Mucci Fassett	Mike Young Productions; MGA Entertainment	Computer	Direct-to-DVD		November 5, 2008	70 minutes
Bratz: Girlz Really Rock	United States	Mucci Fassett	MGA Entertainment	Computer	Direct-to-DVD		September 22, 2008	78 minutes
Bratz Kidz Fairy Tales	United States	Phil Weinstein	MGA Entertainment	Computer	Direct-to-DVD		February 26, 2008	66 minutes
Dashavatar	India	Bhavik Thakore	Phoebus Media	Traditional			June 13, 2008	119 minutes
Davie & Golimyr	United States	Darin McDaniel; Chris Smith; Nathan Smith	Ageless Animation; Lumenas Studios	Stop motion			March 4, 2008	45 minutes
Dayo: Sa Mundo ng Elementalia	Philippines	Robert Quilao		Traditional			December 25, 2008	90 minutes
Dead Fury	United States	Frank Sudol	BlackArro Productions	Traditional			April 9, 2008 (Philadelphia Film Festival); August 5, 2008 (DVD premiere)	82 minutes
Dead Space: Downfall	United States	Chuck Patton	Starz Media; Film Roman; Electronic Arts	Traditional	Direct-to-video		October 28, 2008	75 minutes
Delgo	United States	Marc F. Adler; Jason Maurer	Electric Eye Entertainment Corporation; Fathom Studios	Computer			December 12, 2008	89 minutes
Detective Conan: Full Score of Fear	Japan	Yasuichiro Yamamoto	TMS Entertainment	Traditional			April 19, 2008	115 minutes
Dora Saves the Snow Princess	United States	Katie McWane	Nickelodeon Network	Traditional			November 3, 2008	46 minutes
Doraemon: Nobita and the Legend of the Green Giant 映画 ドラえもん のび太と緑の巨人伝 (Eiga Doraemon Nobita To Midori No Kyojinden)	Japan	Ayumu Watanabe	Shin-Ei Animation	Traditional			March 8, 2008	112 minutes
Dragon Hunters; Chasseurs de dragons	France; Germany; Luxembourg	Arthur Qwak; Guillaume Ivernel	Futurikon; LuxAnimation; Trixter; Mac Guff Ligne	Computer			March 20, 2008 (Russia and New Zealand); March 26, 2008 (France); April 5, 2008 (United States)	82 minutes
Dragonlance: Dragons of Autumn Twilight	United States	Will Meugniot	Toonz Animation	Traditional / Computer			January 15, 2008	90 minutes
Edison and Leo	Canada	Neil Burns	Perfect Circle Productions	Stop motion			September 4, 2008 (Toronto International Film Festival)	79 minutes
The Enchanted Mountain	Italy	Kim Jun Ok	Mondo TV; Studio SEK	Traditional			2008	101 minutes
Fist of the North Star: The Legend of Kenshirô 真救世主伝説 北斗の拳 ケンシロウ伝 (Shin Kyûseishu densetsu Hokuto no Ken – Kenshirô den)	Japan	Toshiki Hirano	TMS Entertainment	Traditional			October 4, 2008	90 minutes
The Flight Before Christmas; Niko – Lentäjän poika	Finland; Denmark; Germany; Ireland	Michael Hegner; Kari Juusonen	Anima Vitae; Cinemaker Oy; A. Film A/S; Ulysses Filmproduktion; Magma Films	Computer			November 1, 2008	80 minutes 45 minutes (TV Version)
Fly Me to the Moon	Belgium; United States	Ben Stassen	nWave Pictures; Illuminata Pictures; Le Tax Shelter du Gouvernement Fédéral de Belgique uMedia uFilm	Computer			January 30, 2008 (Belgium); August 15, 2008 (United States)	84 minutes 50 minutes (IMAX version)
Flying Heroes; Cher Ami... ¡y yo!	Spain	Miquel Pujol	Accio Studios; RTVE	Traditional			September 26, 2008 (San Sebastián Film Festival); June 19, 2009	85 minutes
A Fox's Tale; Kis Vuk	Hungary; United Kingdom	György Gát; János Uzsák	DYN Entertainment	Computer			April 12, 2008 (United Kingdom); April 17, 2008 (Hungary)	85 minutes
From Inside	United States	John Bergin	KC Grinder Productions	Traditional			May 15, 2008 (Puchon International Fantastic Film Festival); April 25, 2009 (Boston Independent Film Festival); October 21, 2014	71 minutes
Futurama: Bender's Game	United States	Dwayne Carey-Hill	The Curiosity Company; 20th Century Fox Television	Traditional	Direct-to-video		November 4, 2008	87 minutes
Futurama: The Beast with a Billion Backs	United States	Peter Avanzino	The Curiosity Company; 20th Century Fox Television	Traditional	Direct-to-video		June 24, 2008	89 minutes
Garfield's Fun Fest	United States	Mark A.Z. Dippé	Paws, Inc. The Animation Picture Company; Davis Entertainment	Computer	Direct-to-video		August 5, 2008	76 minutes
Genius Party	Japan	Mahiro Maeda; Kôji Morimoto; Kazuto Nakazawa; Shin'ya Ôhira; Tatsuyuki Tanaka	Studio 4°C	Traditional			October 11, 2008	85 minutes
Ghatothkach: Master of Magic	India	Singeetham Srinivas Rao	Shemaroo Entertainment	Traditional			May 23, 2008	91 minutes
Ghost in the Shell 2.0 攻殻機動隊 2.0 (Gōsuto In Za Sheru/Kōkaku Kidōtai 2.0)	Japan	Mamoru Oshii	Production I.G	Traditional / Computer			July 12, 2008	83 minutes 85 minutes (Japan)
Gnomes and Trolls: The Secret Chamber; Tomtar och Troll: Den hemliga kammaren	Sweden	Robert Rhodin	White Shark	Computer			January 31, 2008 (Stockholm premiere); March 27, 2009	75 minutes
Goat Story – The Old Prague Legends; Kozí příběh – pověsti staré Prahy	Czech Republic	Jan Tománek	Art And Animation studio	Computer			October 16, 2008 (Czech); May 19, 2010 (United States)	80 minutes
Horton Hears a Who!	United States	Jimmy Hayward; Steve Martino	Blue Sky Studios	Computer			March 14, 2008	86 minutes
Idiots and Angels	United States	Bill Plympton	Bill Plympton Studios	Traditional			April 26, 2008 (Tribeca Film Festival); October 26, 2010 (Los Angeles, California)	78 minutes
If You Were Me: Anima Vision 2 별별 이야기 2 – 여섯 빛깔 무지개 (Byul-Byul Yi-Ya-Gi 2: Yeo-Seot-Bit-Ggal Mu-Ji-Gae)	South Korea	Ann Dong-hee; Ryu Jung-oo; Hong Deok-pyo; Lee Hong-soo; Lee Hong-min; Jung Min-young; Gwon Mi-jeong; Park Yeong-jae	Human Rights Commission of Korea	Traditional / Stop motion			April 17, 2008	95 minutes
Igor	United States; France	Tony Leondis	Metro-Goldwyn-Mayer; Exodus Film Group	Computer			September 19, 2008 (United States); December 17, 2008 (France); September 11, 2009 (Brazil)	86 minutes
Imaginationland: The Movie	United States	Trey Parker	South Park Digital Studios	Computer / Cutout	Direct-to-video		March 11, 2008	67 minutes
Immigrants aka. L.A. Dolce Vita; Immigrants – Jóska menni Amerika	United States; Hungary	Gábor Csupó	Klasky Csupo/Global Tantrum	Traditional			October 30, 2008 (Hungary); October 31, 2009 (United States)	77 minutes
Impy's Wonderland; Urmel voll in Fahrt	Germany	Reinhard Klooss; Holger Tappe	Agir; Ambient Entertainment	Computer			May 1, 2008	84 minutes
John's Arm: Armageddon	United States	Matty Boy Anderson	Mike the Pod	Traditional			August 21, 2008 (Atlanta Underground Film Festival)	118 minutes
Journey to Saturn; Rejsen til Saturn	Denmark	Thorbjørn Christoffersen; Craig Frank	A. Film A/S; TV2 Denmark	Computer			September 26, 2008	90 minutes
Justice League: The New Frontier	United States	Dave Bullock	Warner Bros. Animation	Traditional	Direct-to-video		February 26, 2008	75 minutes
Kung Fu Panda	United States	John Stevenson; Mark Osborne	DreamWorks Animation	Computer			May 15, 2008 (Cannes Film Festival); June 6, 2008	92 minutes
Kungfu Master aka Wong Fei Hong vs Kungfu Panda 黃飛鴻大戰功夫熊貓	China			Computer			August 30, 2008	
Kurt Turns Evil; Kurt blir grusom	Norway; Denmark	Rasmus Sivertsen	Nordisk Film; Qvisten Animation	Computer			October 31, 2008	74 minutes
Life is Cool 그녀는 예뻤다 (Geunyeoneun Yeppeotda)	South Korea	Choi Equan; Choe Seung-won		Traditional			June 12, 2008	98 minutes
Little Dodo	Germany	Thilo Graf Rothkirch; Ute von Münchow-Pohl	Rothkirch Cartoon-Film; MABO Pictures Filmproduktion; Comet Film; Warner Bros. Film Productions Germany	Traditional			January 1, 2008	79 minutes
The Little Mermaid: Ariel's Beginning	United States	Peggy Holmes	Disneytoon Studios	Traditional	Direct-to-video		August 26, 2008	77 minutes
The Little Panda Fighter; Ursinho da Pesada	Brazil		Vídeo Brinquedo	Computer	Direct-to-video		November 18, 2008	51 minutes
Little Princess School; Escola de Princesinhas	Brazil	Ale Mc Haddo	Vídeo Brinquedo	Flash	Direct-to-video			40 minutes
Little Spirit: Christmas in New York	United States	Leopoldo Gout; Susan Holden	Curious Pictures; Jersey Films; MediaEdge	Computer	Direct-to-video		December 10, 2008	60 minutes
Los Campeones de la Lucha Libre	United States	Eddie Mort	Fwak! Animation; Azteca Cine	Flash			July 12, 2008	72 minutes
Madagascar: Escape 2 Africa	United States	Eric Darnell; Tom McGrath	DreamWorks Animation; PDI/DreamWorks	Computer			November 7, 2008	89 minutes
Mamma Moo and the Crow Mamma Mu & Kråkan'	Sweden	Igor Veichtaguin		Traditional			September 19, 2008	77 minutes 78 minutes
Mia and the Migoo; Mia et le Migou	France	Jacques-Rémy Girerd	Folimage	Traditional			December 10, 2008	91 minutes
A Miser Brothers' Christmas	United States	Dave Barton Thomas	Warner Premiere; Warner Bros. Animation; Cuppa Coffee Studios	Stop motion	Direct-to-video		December 13, 2008	49 minutes
Mission in Mocland – A Superspace Adventure	Spain	Juan Manuel Suárez; Juanma Suárez		Computer			November 7, 2008	84 minutes
The Missing Lynx; El Lince Perdido	United Kingdom; Spain	Raul Garcia; Manuel Sicilia	Kandor Graphics; Perro Verde Films; Green Moon; YaYa! Films; Canal Sur Televisión; Televisión de Galicia (TVG) S.A. Etb (Euskal Telebista); Televisión Pública de Canarias; 7 Región de MurciaInstituto de Ciencias y Artes Cinematográficas del Ministerio de CulturaInstituto de Crédito Oficial (ICO); Consejería de Cultura y Medio Ambiente de la Junta de Andalucía; Cajasol	Computer			September 29, 2008 (Animadrid); December 25, 2008 (Spain)	100 minutes
Moonbeam Bear and His Friends; Der Mondbär: Das große Kinoabenteuer	Germany	Thomas Bodenstein; Mike Maurus		Computer			October 16, 2008	71 minutes
Moomin and Midsummer Madness; Muumi I vaarallinen Juhannus	Finland	Maria Lindberg	Filmkompaniet	Stop motion			March 11, 2008 (BUFF Film Festival); April 18, 2008	88 minutes
Nak	Thailand	Natthaphong Ratanachoksirikul	beboydcg	Computer			April 3, 2008	100 minutes
Naruto Shippuden The Movie: Bonds 劇場版 NARUTO−ナルト− 疾風伝 絆 (Gekijōban Naruto Shippūden: Kizuna)	Japan	Masahiko Murata	Studio Pierrot	Traditional			August 2, 2008	93 minutes
Next Avengers: Heroes of Tomorrow	United States	Jay Oliva; Gary Hartle	Lionsgate; MLG Productions; Marvel Studios	Traditional	Direct-to-video		September 2, 2008	78 minutes
One Piece: Episode of Chopper Plus: Bloom in the Winter, Miracle Cherry Blossom エピソードオブチョッパー+ 冬に咲く、奇跡の桜 (Episōdo Obu Choppā Purasu: Fuyu ni Saku, Kiseki no Sakura)	Japan	Junji Shimizu	Toei Animation	Traditional			March 1, 2008	113 minutes
Open Season 2	United States	Matthew O'Callaghan	Sony Pictures Animation; Reel FX Entertainment	Computer	Direct-to-video		September 24, 2008 (South Africa); January 27, 2009 (North America)	76 minutes
Pattenrai!! ~ Minami no Shima no Mizu Monogatari	Japan	Noboru Ichiguro	Mushi Productions	Traditional			November 15, 2008	90 minutes
The Pirates Who Don't Do Anything: A VeggieTales Movie	United States	Mike Nawrocki	Universal Pictures; Big Idea Productions; Jellyfish Studios; Starz Animation	Computer			January 11, 2008	86 minutes
Pokémon: Giratina & the Sky Warrior aka. Pocket Monsters Diamond & Pearl the Movie: Giratina and the Sky Bouquet: Shaymin 劇場版ポケットモンスター ダイヤモンド&パール ギラティナと氷空（そら）の花束 シェイミ (Gekijōban Poketto Monsutā Daiyamondo Pāru Giratina to Sora no Hanataba Sheimi)	Japan	Kunihiko Yuyama	OLM, Inc. OLM Digital	Traditional			July 19, 2008	96 minutes
Ponyo 崖の上のポニョ (Gake no ue no Ponyo)	Japan	Hayao Miyazaki	Studio Ghibli	Traditional			July 19, 2008	101 minutes
Resident Evil: Degeneration バイオハザード：ディジェネレーション (Baiohazādo: Dijenerēshon)	Japan; United States	Makoto Kamiya	Digital Frontier; Capcom	Computer			October 17, 2008	96 minutes
Roadside Romeo रोडसाइड रोमियो	India	Jugal Hansraj	Yash Raj Films; Walt Disney Pictures	Computer			October 23, 2008 (Kuwait) October 24, 2008 (India and United States)	93 minutes
Scooby-Doo! and the Goblin King	United States	Joe Sichta	Warner Bros. Animation	Traditional	Direct-to-video		September 23, 2008	75 minutes
Sing to the Dawn 曦望	Singapore	Philip Mitchell	MediaCorp Raintree Pictures; Infinite Frameworks Studios; Kalyana Shira Film	Traditional		First Singaporian animated feature	October 30, 2008	93 minutes
Sita Sings the Blues	United States	Nina Paley	Nina Paley	Flash animation			February 11, 2008 (Berlin)	82 minutes
The Sky Crawlers スカイ・クロラ (Sukai Kurora)	Japan	Mamoru Oshii	Production I.G	Traditional			August 2, 2008	122 minutes
Space Chimps	United States; United Kingdom; Canada	Kirk DeMicco	Vanguard Animation; Starz Animation	Computer			July 18, 2008	81 minutes
Spike	France	David Alaux; Éric Tosti	TAT Productions	Computer	Television film		December 26, 2008	35 minutes
Spirit of the Forest; Espíritu del bosque	Spain	David Rubin	Dygra Films	Computer			September 12, 2008	90 minutes
Star Wars: The Clone Wars	United States	Dave Filoni	Lucasfilm Animation	Computer			August 10, 2008 (Grauman's Egyptian Theatre); August 15, 2008	98 minutes
Storm Rider Clash of the Evils	China	Dante Lam	Puzzle Animation Studio Limited; Shanghai Media Group	Traditional / Computer			September 15, 2008 (Hong Kong); July 19, 2009	98 minutes
Strawberry Shortcake: Rockaberry Roll	United States	Melissa Mabie	DIC Entertainment; American Greetings	Traditional	Direct-to-video		August 12, 2008	45 minutes
Sunshine Barry & The Disco Worms; Disco Ormene	Denmark; Germany	Thomas Borch Nielsen	Crone Film; Radar Film	Computer			October 10, 2008	75 minutes
The Tale of Despereaux	United Kingdom; United States	Rob Stevenhagen; Sam Fell	Universal Pictures; Relativity Media; Larger Than Life Productions; Framestore Animation	Computer			December 19, 2008	97 minutes
The Tale of Soldier Fedot, The Daring Fellow; Про Федота-стрельца, удалого молодца (Pro Fedota-Streltsa, Udalogo Molodtsa)	Russia	Ludmila Steblyanko	Melnitsa Animation Studio; CTB Film Company	Traditional			December 14, 2008	70 minutes
Tengen Toppa Gurren Lagann: Gurren Chapter 劇場版 天元突破グレンラガン 【紅蓮篇】 (Gekijōban Tengen Toppa Guren Ragan [Guren Hen])	Japan	Hiroyuki Imaishi	Gainax	Traditional			September 6, 2008	112 minutes
Tinker Bell	United States	Bradley Raymond	Disneytoon Studios	Computer			October 28, 2008	78 minutes
Tiny Robots; Robozinhos	Brazil	Michelle Gabriel	Vídeo Brinquedo	Computer	Direct-to-video		2008	45 minutes
The Toe Tactic	United States	Emily Hubley	Orchard Pictures; Hubbub; Hermetic Pictures	Traditional			March 2008 (New Directors/New Films) and (South by Southwest Film Festival); January 28, 2009	83 minutes
Tripping the Rift: The Movie	Canada	Bernie Denk	Anchor Bay Entertainment	Computer	Direct-to-DVD		March 25, 2008.	75 minutes
Turok: Son of Stone	United States	Tad Stones; Curt Geda; Dan Riba; Frank Squillace	Classic Media; Film Roman; Starz Media	Traditional	Direct-to-DVD		February 5, 2008	73 minutes
Unstable Fables: 3 Pigs & a Baby	United States	Howard E. Baker; Arish Fyzee	The Jim Henson Company; Prana Animation Studios; Flame Ventures; The Weinstein Company	Computer	Direct-to-DVD		March 4, 2008	76 minutes
Unstable Fables: Goldilocks and the 3 Bears Show	United States	Howard E. Baker; Arish Fyzee	The Jim Henson Company; Prana Animation Studios; Flame Ventures; The Weinstein Company	Computer	Direct-to-DVD		December 16, 2008	78 minutes
Unstable Fables: Tortoise vs. Hare	United States	Howard E. Baker; Arish Fyzee	The Jim Henson Company; Prana Animation Studios; Flame Ventures; The Weinstein Company	Computer	Direct-to-DVD		September 9, 2008	76 minutes
Urduja	Philippines	Reggie Entienza	APT Entertainment; Seventoon; Imaginary Friends	Traditional			June 18, 2008	100 minutes
VeggieTales: Tomato Sawyer and Huckleberry Larry's Big River Rescue	United States	Brian Roberts	Big Idea Productions	Computer	Direct-to-video		July 15, 2008	49 minutes
WALL-E	United States	Andrew Stanton	Pixar Animation Studios	Computer			June 23, 2008 (Los Angeles); June 27, 2008	97 minutes
Waltz with Bashir ואלס עם באשיר	Israel; Germany; France	Ari Folman	Bridgit Folman Film Gang; Les Films d'Ici; Razor Film Produktion	Flash			May 13, 2008 (Cannes); June 5, 2008 (Israel)	90 minutes
Winner and the Gold Child	Italy	Orlando Corradi	Mondo TV; SEK Studio	Traditional				
The World Is Hot Enough	Canada	Edin Ibric	March Entertainment	Traditional			February 5, 2008	72 minutes
Wanderer in the land of Elementalia; Dayo: Sa Mundo ng Elementalia	Philippines	Robert Quilao	Cutting Edge Productions	Traditional / Computer			December 25, 2008	90 minutes
Wubbzy's Big Movie!	United States	James Burks; Steve Daye; Brian Hogan; Frank Rocco; Patty Shinagawa	Bolder Media; Starz Media	Traditional	Television film		August 29, 2008	76 minutes
Yes! Precure 5 GoGo! Happy Birthday in the Land of Sweets; Yes!プリキュア5 GoGo! お菓子の国のハッピーバースディ♪ (Yes! Precure 5 GoGo! Okashi no Kuni no Happy Birthday)	Japan	Tatsuya Nagamine	Toei Animation	Traditional			November 8, 2008	72 minutes
El Zorro Ladrón	Spain	Juan Bautista Berasategi	Lotura Films	Traditional			2008; February 6, 2009 (Spain)	70 minutes

== Highest-grossing films ==
The following is a list of the 11 highest-grossing animated feature films first released in 2008.

Highest-grossing animated films of 2008
Rank	Title	Studio	Worldwide gross	Ref.
1	Kung Fu Panda	DreamWorks Animation / Paramount Pictures	$631,744,560	
2	Madagascar: Escape 2 Africa	DreamWorks Animation / Paramount Pictures / Pacific Data Images	$603,900,354	
3	WALL-E	Pixar / Walt Disney Pictures	$533,281,433	
4	Bolt	Walt Disney Animation Studios / Walt Disney Pictures	$309,979,994	
5	Horton Hears a Who!	Blue Sky Studios / 20th Century Fox	$297,138,014	
6	Ponyo	Studio Ghibli	$201,750,937	
7	The Tale of Despereaux	Relativity Media / Framestore / Universal Pictures	$86,947,965	
8	Star Wars: The Clone Wars	Lucasfilm / Warner Bros. Pictures	$68,282,844	
9	Space Chimps	20th Century Fox	$64,834,964	
10	Pokémon: Giratina and the Sky Warrior	OLM, Inc.	$43,338,599	
11	The Pirates Who Don't Do Anything: A VeggieTales Movie	Universal Pictures / Big Idea Entertainment	$12,981,269	

== See also ==
- List of animated television series of 2008
