= Fung Wan (disambiguation) =

Fung Wan (pinyin: Fēng Yún) or The Storm Riders or Wind and Cloud may refer to

- Fung Wan, a Manhua (Chinese comic) series by Ma Wing Shing
- Adaptations of the comic series
  - Wind and Cloud, a Taiwanese TV series released in 2002
  - Wind and Cloud 2, a 2004 sequel to the 2002 TV series
  - The Storm Riders, a 1999 film
  - Storm Rider Clash of the Evils, a 2008 animated film
  - The Storm Warriors, a 2009 sequel to the 1999 film

== See also ==
- Feng Yun (disambiguation)
