= Feng Yun =

Feng Yun may refer to:

- Feng Yun (Later Tang), minister of the Later Tang
- Feng Yun (Go player) (born 1966), Chinese professional Go player
- Feng Yun (hurdler) (born 1976), female Chinese hurdler
- Fung Wan, a comic series from Hong Kong
  - The Storm Riders, a 1999 Hong Kong film
  - Wind and Cloud, a 2002 Taiwanese TV series
  - Wind and Cloud 2, a 2004 Taiwanese TV series, sequel to the 2002 TV series
  - Storm Rider Clash of the Evils, a 2008 Chinese-Hong Kong animated film
  - The Storm Warriors, a 2009 Hong Kong film, sequel to the 1999 film

== See also ==
- Fengyun, China's weather satellites
- Yun Feng, a cruise missile in development in Taiwan
