= Li Xintian =

Li Xintian is the name of:

- Li Xintian (psychologist), Chinese psychologist
- Li Xintian (writer), Chinese writer
