= Hero of the Times =

1999 Singaporean-Taiwanese TV series

- Poster
- Also known as: New Fong Sai-yuk
- 新方世玉
- Genre: Wuxia
- Screenplay by: Chen Disheng
- Story by: Xu Shengliang
- Directed by: Hu Mingkai
- Starring: Vincent Zhao; Leanne Liu; Vincent Ng; Yvonne Lim; Ix Shen; May Phua
- Theme music composer: Chen Lei; Wen Jinhua
- Opening theme: "Nameless Pawn" (无名小卒) by Dick and Cowboy
- Ending theme: "Loved Well" (好好爱过) by Yvonne Lim
- Composer: Redwan Ali
- Countries of origin: Singapore; Taiwan
- Original language: Mandarin
- No. of episodes: 30

Production
- Producer: Yuan Zaixian
- Production locations: Singapore; Taiwan
- Cinematography: Pan Wenhui; Chen Daoquan; Zhao Weixian; Tang Rongliang
- Editor: Xu Jiayan
- Running time: ≈45 minutes per episode
- Production companies: TCS; CTV

Original release
- Network: TCS Eighth Frequency; CTV
- Release: 1999 – 2000

Hero of the Times (新方世玉) is a Singaporean-Taiwanese wuxia television series based on legends about Fang Shiyu, a fictional Chinese folk hero and martial artist who lived during the Qing dynasty. It was co-produced by the Television Corporation of Singapore and Taiwan's China Television, directed by Hu Mingkai, and starred Vincent Zhao as Fang Shiyu. It was first aired in Singapore on TCS Eighth Frequency (now MediaCorp Channel 8) from late 1999 to early 2000.

== Synopsis ==
The series is set in 18th-century China during the Qing dynasty. The Yongzheng Emperor orders Nalan Degang, a Manchu bannerman, to lead a secret death squad to eliminate the Great Ming Society, a Yangzhou-based rebel movement seeking to overthrow the Qing dynasty and restore the Ming dynasty.

Fang Shiyu is a son of Fang De, Yangzhou's governor. He spends his time with his best friend, Nalan Dekai. Zhu Lingce, a leader of the Great Ming Society, was previously in a romantic relationship with Miao Cuihua, Fang Shiyu's mother. Although Miao Cuihua has married Fang De, she still has feelings for Zhu Lingce. It is later revealed that Fang De has been working undercover for the Great Ming Society as Yangzhou's governor.

Fang Shiyu, Nalan Dekai, and their friend Song Tiezhu travel to Shaolin Monastery to learn martial arts. Song Tiezhu, tempted by wealth and glory, agrees to spy on the rebels for Nalan Degang. When Nalan Degang captures Zhu Lingce, Fang Shiyu and his friends break into prison to save him. However, Song Tiezhu betrays them, causes Zhu Lingce's death, and exposes Fang De's true identity as a rebel.

While Fang De is arrested and taken to Beijing, Fang Shiyu manages to escape and he takes Nalan Dekai, who was injured while helping him, to Shaolin for treatment. Song Tiezhu leads government forces to attack Shaolin and capture them. Fang Shiyu defeats Song Tiezhu in a fight and cripples him.

The Yongzheng Emperor attempts to sow discord between Fang De and the rebels, tricking the latter into believing that Fang De has betrayed them. Fang De is forced to commit suicide to prove his innocence.

In the meantime, Fang Shiyu trains hard in martial arts with the aim of avenging his father. He breaks into the Forbidden City in an attempt to assassinate the Yongzheng Emperor, but ultimately gives up on his quest for vengeance when he realises the best option is to spare the emperor's life to avoid creating a power vacuum that could lead to more bloodshed.

== Cast ==
- Vincent Zhao as Fang Shiyu
- Leanne Liu as Miao Cuihua
- Vincent Ng as Nalan Dekai
- Yvonne Lim as Lei Xiaoti
- Ix Shen as Nalan Degang
- May Phua as Princess Fulu
- Chunyu Shanshan as Song Tiezhu
- Shirley He as You Hongxiu
- Rayson Tan as Zhu Lingce
- Li Wenhai as Fang De
- Cai Yiwei as Fang Shaoyu
- Wang Huichun as the Yongzheng Emperor
- Huang Chung-kun as the 14th Prince
- Chen Guohua as Murong Yixiao
- Xiang Yun as Wu Huaniang
- Lin Meijiao as Abbess Babao
- Elvis Tsui as Ao Tianwei
- Qian Zhigang as Lei Laohu
- Wang Ailing as Xiantao
- Lau Shun as the Kangxi Emperor
- Chen Wencong as Zhu Qifeng
- Dai Peng as Xie Junyuan
- Zhou Quanxi as Princess Fulu's father
- Chen Zhiguang as Yaoba
- Fan Wenjie as Jinbo
- He Saizhou as Yinhuan
- Wang Xiuyun as Zhima Dama
- Hong Zhaorong as Du Liaoliao
- Liang Tian as Wuliuye
- Zheng Wen as Feng Haichao
- Yang Tianfu as Jiang Changzhi
- Li Zhizhou as Sima Jin

== See also ==
- Fong Sai-yuk, the main character in the television series.
- Fong Sai-yuk (film), a 1993 Hong Kong film starring Jet Li as Fong Sai-yuk.
- Fong Sai-yuk II, a sequel to Fong Sai-yuk (1993).
