= May Phua =

Singaporean actress and host (born 1975 or 1976)

- Born: 14 May 1975 or 1976 (age 50–51); Singapore
- Other names: Pan Shuqin; Pan Shuqing
- Education: SHATEC
- Occupations: Actress; fitness trainer; host; businesswoman
- Years active: 1995–present
- Spouse: Mikel Ong (m. 2004)
- Children: 2

Birth name
- Traditional Chinese: 潘淑欽
- Simplified Chinese: 潘淑钦
- Hanyu Pinyin: Pān Shūqīn

Former stage names
- Chinese: 潘竖卿 / 潘淑卿
- Hanyu Pinyin: Pān Shūqīng

May Phua (born 14 May 1975 or 1976) is a Singaporean actress, fitness trainer, host and businesswoman.

== Early life ==
Phua attended SHATEC where she obtained Diploma in Tourism in 1996.

== Career ==
Phua was a full time Mediacorp artiste from 1996 to 2014. She was talent spotted from the finals of The New Paper New Face Contest in 1995. The following year, at age 19, she made her television debut in the long-running popular sitcom Don't Worry Be Happy, playing the role of Xiao-mei (little sister), a happy-go-lucky girl, and of which became one of her most prominent role in her acting career. A few years later, Phua began to appear in several Mediacorp co-productions with other territories including the period drama Hero of the Times (1999), as well as acting alongside Taiwanese star Jacklyn Wu in The Tax Files (2000), and acting opposite Julian Cheung in action drama Dare To Strike (2000).

Phua is also known for hosting the Saturday night variety show PSC Nite: Weekend Delight in 2000, Battle Of The Best (2001) which showcases various occupations, and partnering with Sam Tseng in the Taiwanese gameshow Treasure Hunt (2002).

In 2007, Phua won Star Awards for Best Supporting Actress for her role in Mars vs Venus.

== Ventures ==
In 2015, Phua invested in a six-figure sum in a leading mattress brand in Korea called Acebed where she brought the brand to Singapore with a Korean business partner. She had also once dabbled in furniture business with her friends for about five years before pulling out due to her busy acting schedule. She also owns a media company Celevi to manage her social media presence.

In 2020, Phua took up a personal training course and became a certified personal trainer after graduation.

== Personal life ==
Phua was in a relationship with actor and writer-producer Chen Wencong from 1996 to 2002.

In July 2004, Phua and Mikel Ong married at The Sentosa Resort Spa. The couple has two sons, Ix Shang and Keyan.

In 2005, Phua changed her Chinese name to "潘竖卿" (Pān Shūqīng) and at one point uses the Chinese name "潘淑卿" (Pān Shūqīng). To date, Phua returns to using her Chinese birth name "潘淑钦" (Pān Shūqīn).

In late 2013, Phua was diagnosed with a slipped disc and subsequently underwent rehabilitation for six months.

In 2020, Phua revealed that she lost both her parents within the same year. Her mother died of colon cancer in July and about two months later her father died due to sudden heart failure. Both were 69.

== Filmography ==
Phua has appeared in the following programmes and films.

=== Television series ===
- Don't Worry Be Happy (1996)
- Places In My Heart (1996)
- My Family, My Wife (1996)
- Don't Worry Be Happy II (1997)
- Stand by Me (1998)
- A Piece Of Sky (1998)
- Myths & Legends of Singapore Black Vs White (1998)
- Season of Love (1998)
- Don't Worry Be Happy III (1998)
- Hero of the Times (1999)
- The Millennium Bug (1999)
- Bright Future (1999)
- From The Courtroom (1999)
- Don't Worry Be Happy IV (1999)
- The Tax Files (2000)
- Dare To Strike (2000)
- Don't Worry Be Happy V (2000)
- The Hotel (2001)
- Don't Worry Be Happy VI (2001)
- In Pursuit of Peace (2001)
- Brotherhood (2002)
- Don't Worry, Be Happy Special (2002)
- Love Is Beautiful (2003)
- Homeless (2003)
- An Ode to Life (2004)
- My Mighty-in-Laws (2004)
- A New Life (2005)
- Rhapsody in Blue (2006)
- Women of Times (2006)
- The Shining Star (2006)
- House of Joy (2006)
- Mars vs Venus (2007)
- Metamorphosis (2007)
- Love Blossoms (2008)
- Taste of Love (2008)
- Mrs P.I. (2010)
- The Family Court (2010)
- With You (2010)
- The Best Things in Life (2010)
- New Beginnings (2010)
- Bountiful Blessings (2011)
- The In-Laws (2011)
- A Song to Remember (2011)
- C.L.I.F. (2011)
- Poetic Justice (2012)
- Don't Stop Believin' (2012)
- Yours Fatefully (2012)
- Gonna Make It (2013)
- Love at Risk (2013)
- The Dream Makers (2013)
- The Caregivers (2014)
- Mystic Whispers (2014; Toggle series)
- The Queen (2016)
- The Driver (2019)
- Lightspeed (2021)
- CTRL (2021)

=== Film ===
- The Matchmaker's Match (1997; telemovie)
- The Eye 2 (2004)
- The Wayang Kids (2018)

=== Variety show host ===
- PSC Nite: Weekend Delight (2000)
- Lunar New Special (2001)
- Battle Of The Best (2001)
- Lunar New Year Special (2002)
- Treasure Hunt (2002)
- Let's Party With Food (2003)
- Wow Wow World (2003)
- Tiger Food Adventure (2003)
- Let's Party With Food VII (2009)
- Let's Party With Food VIII (2010)
- Life Hacks (2016; guest appearance)

== Discography ==
=== Soundtrack contributions ===
- "Made in Singapore" (for The Recruit Diaries; 2016)

== Awards and nominations ==
Year	Award	Category	Nominated work	Result	Ref
1997	Star Awards	Top 10 Most Popular Female Artistes	—N/a	Nominated	
2000	Star Awards	Top 10 Most Popular Female Artistes	—N/a	Nominated	
2001	Star Awards	Top 10 Most Popular Female Artistes	—N/a	Nominated	
2004	Star Awards	Best Supporting Actress	An Ode to Life	Nominated	
2007	Star Awards	Best Supporting Actress	Mars vs Venus	Won	
