= God of War (2017 film) =

- Film poster

Chinese name
- Traditional Chinese: 蕩寇風雲
- Simplified Chinese: 荡寇风云
Transcriptions
Standard Mandarin
- Hanyu Pinyin: Dàng Kòu Fēng Yún
Yue: Cantonese
- Jyutping: Dong^{6} Kau^{3} Fung^{1} Wan^{4}
- Directed by: Gordon Chan
- Written by: Maria Wong; Frankie Tam; Xiong Zhaozheng; Wu Mengzhang
- Produced by: Paul Cheng; Gordon Chan
- Starring: Vincent Zhao; Sammo Hung; Yasuaki Kurata
- Cinematography: Takuro Ishizaka
- Edited by: Chan Ki-hop
- Music by: Shigeru Umebayashi
- Production companies: Bona Film Group; East Wave Film Group; Media Asia
- Distributed by: Well Go USA Entertainment
- Release dates: 26 May 2017 (Seattle); 27 May 2017 (China); 15 June 2017 (Hong Kong)
- Running time: 128 minutes
- Countries: China; Hong Kong
- Languages: Mandarin; Japanese

God of War (Chinese: 蕩寇風雲) is a 2017 historical war film directed by Gordon Chan and starring Vincent Zhao, Sammo Hung, and Yasuaki Kurata. A co-production between China and Hong Kong, the film is based on general Qi Jiguang's suppression of the wokou pirates during the Ming dynasty.

== Plot ==
In 16th century China, a force of Imperial Ming soldiers under the command of General Yu Dayou (Sammo Hung) assault a fortress held by Japanese pirates (wokou). The attack is easily repelled and the wokou inflict heavy casualties on the Ming forces. It is revealed that the Wokou are in fact a mixed force of Japanese ronin, disgruntled Han Chinese and a force of samurai under the command of Commander Kumasawa. The samurai have been sent by their daimyo to free an imprisoned Chinese noblemen who had made significant financial contributions to the daimyo.

Following the latest failed assault, the Ming forces receive a new commander, General Qi Jiguang (Vincent Zhao), who begins recruiting hardened villagers to build a new army. General Qi launches a successful sneak assault on the Japanese fortress, forcing them to retreat. Despite this, General Qi is nearly arrested for failing to capture the Japanese and is even accused of colluding with them.

The Japanese later divide their forces in three and plan to attack three different targets, with Kumasawa's army attacking Xinhe and Taizhou simultaneously and the ronin attacking Ninghai. Taizhou is the provincial capital, while Xinhe holds General Qi's soldiers' families, including Qi's wife. Commander Kumasawa believes that by attacking three targets they will overextend the Ming defenses, while his ward, young Lord Imagawa, believes they should simply launch one massive assault against Taizhou.

General Qi learns of the planned attacks and decides to intercept the ronin, defeating them before returning to Taizhou to defend the provincial capital despite knowing this will leave his wife in Xinhe nearly defenseless. Nonetheless, General Qi's wife rallies the soldiers' families to form an impromptu defense, desperately holding off the samurai.

At Taizhou, General Qi is nearly overwhelmed and defeated when Lord Imagawa defies Commander Kumasawa to attack Qi with the surviving ronin. However, last minute reinforcements allow General Qi to decisively defeat the Japanese, forcing them to flee back to their vessels. General Qi then rushes back to Xinhe, successfully relieving the city from the Japanese forces.

Determined not to allow the Japanese to escape, Qi and his forces attack the Japanese as they are loading onto their ships. Commander Kumasawa sends Lord Imagawa to safety before making a last stand, personally dueling General Qi before being defeated and committing suicide. The film ends with General Qi's wife waiting for her husband, going inside of their home as she waits for his arrival.

== Cast ==
- Vincent Wenzhuo Zhao as General Qi Jiguang
- Sammo Hung as General Yu Dayou
- Yasuaki Kurata as Commander Kumasawa (熊澤司令官, Kumazawa shirei-kan)
- Regina Wan as Lady Qi
- Keisuke Koide as Lord Yamagawa (山川卿, Yamakawa kyō)
- Jiang Luxia as He Ying

== Awards and nominations ==
Award	Category	Recipients	Result
37th Hong Kong Film Awards	Best Supporting Actor	Yasuaki Kurata	Nominated

== Release ==
God of War screened at the Seattle International Film Festival on 26 May 2017. It was released in the United States in Mandarin and Japanese with English subtitles on June 2, 2017. It was distributed by Well Go USA Entertainment.
