= Vincent Zhao =

Chinese actor and martial artist

- 赵文卓
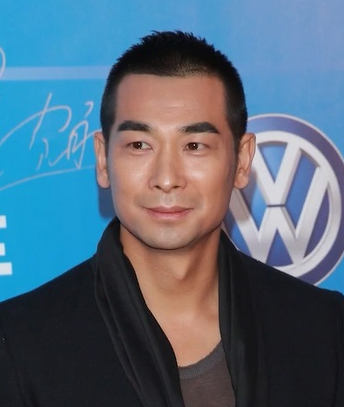
- Zhao in 2018
- Pronunciation: Zhào Wénzhuó
- Born: Zhao Zhuo (赵卓); Harbin, Heilongjiang, China
- Other names: Vincent Chiu; Chiu Man-cheuk; Chao Wen-jar; Wenzhuo Zhao
- Education: Beijing Sport University
- Occupations: Actor; martial artist
- Years active: 1993–present
- Height: 176 cm (5 ft 9 in)
- Spouse: Zhang Danlu (m. 2006)
- Children: 4

Chinese name
- Traditional Chinese: 趙文卓
- Simplified Chinese: 赵文卓
Transcriptions
Standard Mandarin
- Hanyu Pinyin: Zhào Wénzhuó
Yue: Cantonese
- Jyutping: Ziu^{6} Man^{4}coek^{3}

Vincent Zhao Wenzhuo (Chinese: 赵文卓; born Zhao Zhuo [赵卓]), sometimes credited as Vincent Chiu or Chiu Man-cheuk, is a Chinese actor and martial artist. He is best known for portraying Chinese folk hero Wong Fei-hung in both film and television, most notably Once Upon a Time in China IV (1993) and its 1994 sequel in the Once Upon a Time in China film series, its spinoff television series (1995–96), and Kung Fu League (2018).

Trained in various wushu techniques, such as tongbeiquan and tai chi, especially the Chen and Yang styles, Zhao won many national championships while studying at the Beijing Sport University. After being spotted by Hong Kong filmmaker Corey Yuen, he made his acting debut as the antagonist in the martial arts film Fong Sai-yuk (1993). He went on to play leading roles in many Hong Kong and Chinese films, such as The Blade (1995), Mahjong Dragon (1996), The Blacksheep Affair (1998), Fist Power (2000), and Invisible Tattoo (2019), among others. He portrayed Zheng Chenggong in The Sino-Dutch War 1661 (2001), Zhao Shuo in Sacrifice (2010), So Chan in True Legend (2010), and Qi Jiguang in God of War (2017). He starred in his directorial debut Counter Attack (2021).

He has appeared in numerous television series, such as Hero of the Times (1999–2000), Huo Yuanjia (2001), Drunken Hero (2002), Lost City in Snow Heaven (2005), Seven Swordsmen (2006), The Master of Tai Chi (2008), and Invincible Knights Errant (2011), among others.

== Early life ==
Zhao was born in Harbin, Heilongjiang, China the youngest of three boys. His father was a martial arts practitioner, and his mother was a professional sprinter, who broke the record for being the fastest female sprinter of Harbin. Under the instruction of his father, Zhao attended martial arts lessons at the age of eight but he never completely devoted himself to his lessons as he was more interested in singing. In the early 1980s, Zhao was sent to a martial arts academy in Harbin and began to train vigorously, where he started to love the sport. He soon became the youngest member of the Harbin wushu team, which was established in 1985. Trained in various wushu techniques, Zhao mastered Tongbeiquan, tai chi, especially the Chen and Yang styles.

Zhao maintained high academic standards, and in 1990, he was accepted by Beijing Sport University to study martial arts. Throughout his university career, he joined many national championships, winning first place titles and gold medals for the National Junior Championship, the National All-Around Championship, and also the National Martial Arts Championship. He was also qualified to be in China's national martial arts team, and his classmates gave him the nickname, "Kungfu King".

== Career ==
=== Fong Sai-yuk ===
In 1992, Hong Kong film producer Corey Yuen went to Beijing Sport University to find a martial artist to play the role of the antagonist for his 1993 film Fong Sai-yuk. Yuen found Zhao through the latter's instructor and was immediately impressed with Zhao. Initially, Zhao was uninterested, but Yuen insisted on offering him the role because he had "the skill and looks." After further encouragement from peers and mentors, Zhao accepted the offer and shooting began in the same year. Zhao was often teased for looking too nice and young for the role of the villain, the Governor of Nine Gates, but under the instruction of Yuen and other directors, he learned the easiest way to "look evil". He said,

"The director told me: Chiu Man-cheuk, when you look at people, don't look at them like how you usually do. You must look at them from the corner of your eyes with your profile facing them. That way, you will look evil."

During filming, Zhao also enrolled in acting classes for three months. Fong Sai-yuk was released in March 1993 and became a box office hit in Hong Kong, grossing HK$30,666,842.

=== Once Upon a Time in China ===
After only a month into the filming of Fong Sai-yuk, contract problems between Tsui Hark and Jet Li caused Li to back out from the fourth installment of the Once Upon a Time in China saga. Tsui met Zhao on the set of Fong Sai-yuk and was impressed with Zhao's performance that he quickly recruited Zhao to replace Li in playing the role of Wong Fei-hung. Tsui also encouraged Zhao to sign a three-year contract to be a full-time actor, but Zhao rejected the offer, stating that he felt that his education was more important. Zhao continued to devote himself to filming during school vacations for Green Snake (1993) and Once Upon a Time in China IV (1994). During filming for Green Snake, Zhao was hung high up in the air during a stunt with two steel wires supporting him but during an incident one of the steel wires broke and Zhao stated that if the other wire were to also break that he could have lost his life as well. Zhao was ultimately very frightened especially after filming this scene. During the filming of one of the Wong Fei Hung movies, he seriously injured his ankle to the point where it hadn't healed until the year 2012. He stated that some of the bones in his ankle still hasn't healed yet and that before this injury he was okay with doing the majority of his stunts even jumping from third or second story high buildings. The injury has also affected his flexibility as well.

Although Once Upon a Time in China IV grossed less in the box office than the first three installments, it was significant enough to continue the franchise with a fifth installment, Once Upon a Time in China V (1995). While shooting a scene, Zhao slipped during a fighting sequence and injured his head. He was rushed to the hospital and got stitches. He recovered quickly and shooting continued after several weeks. Once Upon a Time in China V was Zhao's last role as Wong Fei-hung in the films, as Jet Li returned for the sixth and last installment, Once Upon a Time in China and America (1997).

Zhao continued playing Wong Fei-hung in the television drama Wong Fei Hung Series, also produced by Tsui Hark. The series was aired on ATV in Hong Kong for two years and received high ratings (although Wong Fei Hung Series: The Final Victory only had moderate ratings).

=== 1997–1999 ===
In 1997, Zhao signed a management contract with China Star, a Hong Kong talent agency, after which he began to work on more films, such as The Blacksheep Affair (1998), Body Weapon (1999) and Fist Power (1999–2000). Many considered him as "the next Jet Li".

=== 2000–2010 ===
Zhao's contract with China Star ended in 1999, and he decided to turn his focus to the mainland Chinese market in hope of making more money (probably due to economic differences), working on television series and films such as The Sino-Dutch War 1661, Wind and Cloud and Seven Swordsmen. In 2006, Zhao returned to Hong Kong and began working on The Master of Tai Chi, produced by TVB.

During an interview concerning his career and the transition from movie actor to television actor. He said tactfully "at the beginning of the transition, my heart felt like it was in a uncomfortable state."

Reviews for Zhao's performance in television series were mixed, and many criticized him for giving up big productions and the silver screen. Zhao explained:

"I never took professional acting classes. The only thing I could do back then were sports and martial arts. In order to train myself, I must accept more television series to touch up my acting."

While working on The Master of Tai Chi, Zhao was given a script for a new martial arts film and he accepted the lead role. Zhao signed with Hollywood agency CAA in 2006 with help from Jackie Chan. He was originally selected to play the lead villain in Rush Hour 3, but the role was eventually given to Hiroyuki Sanada. After spending one year and a half in America, Zhao returned to Beijing and went into an obvious physical breakdown. In September 2008 he returned to Beijing to prepare for his next film, True Legend. True Legend opened up to mixed reviews and was a failure at the box office. It nevertheless won the Best Asian Action Movie award. In April 2010 Zhao joined Sacrifice's star-studded cast and was only given a minor role.

=== 2011–present ===
Zhao starred alongside Yang Mi, Louis Fan, Xu Jiao and Dennis To in the 2012 martial arts fantasy film Wu Dang that was directed by Patrick Leung, written by Chan Khan, and action choreographed by Corey Yuen.

On 19 January 2012, in a press conference held in Beijing, it was announced that Zhao would be starring with Donnie Yen in the film Special Identity. However, on 29 February, Zhao left the production due to changes in the script by Yen.

Since March 1, 2017, Zhao is employed as Health Qigong ambassador.

In 2021, he joined the cast of Call Me By Fire as a contestant.

== Personal life ==
Zhao graduated from Beijing Sport University in 1994 and decided to remain there as a martial arts instructor. However, due to his busy filming schedule, he only taught classes for three months before resigning.

During his time at Beijing Academy, Zhao signed on for two months of dancing classes and won the National College Dance Championship Competition.

He was once linked with Anita Mui in early 1995 but the pair broke apart in 1996.

Zhao had a son from a previous relationship with a Shanghai college student known as Xiao Lian (小连) who was studying in Canada and a reported pianist in 2001. His son was born in August 2002. In 2004, both mother and son moved back to Beijing where she opened a yoga center.

In 2002, Zhao met Zhang Danlu and they married in June 2006. Their daughter was born in September 2007. In November 2007, Zhao brought his family back to Beijing. On 15 July 2011, Zhang gave birth in Hong Kong to their second son. On 14 September 2016, Zhang gave birth to a daughter, their third child (Zhao's fourth).

== Filmography ==
=== Film ===
Year	Title	Role	Notes
1993	Fong Sai-yuk	Governor of Nine Gates	United States release title The Legend
1993	Once Upon a Time in China IV	Wong Fei-hung	
1993	Green Snake	Monk Fa-hai	
1994	Once Upon a Time in China V	Wong Fei-hung	
1995	The Chinese Feast	Lung Kwun-bo	
1995	The Blade	On Man / Ting-on	
1996	Mahjong Dragon	Pak Kwai-sau	
1998	The Blacksheep Affair	Yim Dong	United States release title Another Meltdown
1999	Body Weapon	Wu Chi-kwan	
2000	Fist Power	Brian Cheuk	
2001	The Sino-Dutch War 1661	Zheng Chenggong	Nominated - Golden Rooster Awards for Best Actor
2002	The Wesley's Mysterious File		
2005	Dragon Get Angry	Rong Haishan	Television film based on the television series Fist of Hero (1999)
2005	In the Blue	Wushu coach	Also action choreographer
2010	True Legend	Su Can / Begger Su	Limited release in the United States by Indomina distribution film company on 13 May 2011
2010	Sacrifice	Zhao Shuo / Zhao Zhuangzi	
2012	Wu Dang	Tang Yunlong	
2014	The White Haired Witch of Lunar Kingdom	Jin Duyi	
2014	The Boundary	Shao Yun Feng	
2017	God of War	Qi Jiguang	In Mandarin with English subtitle.
2018	The Unity of Heroes	Wong Fei-hung	Also producer, broadcast on iQIYI Online Media
2018	The Unity of Heroes 2: Warriors of the Nation	Wong Fei-hung	
2018	Wong Fei-Hung: Wrath of Sea	Wong Fei-hung	Also producer, broadcast on IQIYI Online Media
2018	Kung fu Alliance	Wong Fei-hung	
2018	Kung Fu League	Wong Fei-hung	
2019	Invisible Tattoo	Achang (Tattoo Master)	Nominated for Best Actor at 2018 Macau International Film Festival, won Golden Lotus Excellent Actor at 2018 Macau International Film Festival

=== Television ===
Year	Title	Role
1996	Wong Fei Hung Series	Wong Fei-hung
1998	Hua Mulan	Li Liang
1999	Fist of Hero	Rong Haishan
2001	Hero of the Times	Fang Shiyu
2001	New May Flower	Zhao Shijun
2001	Huo Yuanjia	Huo Yuanjia
2001	Jingwu Yingxiong Chen Zhen	Huo Yuanjia
2002	Drunken Hero	Mi Wentian
2002	Wind and Cloud	Nie Feng
2002	Wudang I	Zhang Sanfeng
2002	Book and Sword, Gratitude and Revenge	Chen Jialuo
2003	Lady Wu: The First Empress	Li Junxian
2004	Miracle Healers	Liu Xuan
2004	Wind and Cloud 2	Nie Feng
2005	Lost City in Snow Heaven	Lei Ou
2005	Four Rarities of the Royal Palace	Kangxi Emperor
2005	Wudang II	Zhang Sanfeng
2006	Seven Swordsmen	Chu Zhaonan
2008	The Master of Tai Chi	Mo Ma
2011	Invincible Knights-Errant	Zhan Zhao
2014	Legend of Hongan General	Liu Tong Luo
2015	Millions of Hands and Eyes	Yuan Zhang
2019	Huo Yuan Jia	Huo Yuan Jia
2020	Heroes	Huo Yuan Jia
