= Lost City in Snow Heaven =

- Poster
- Chinese: 雪域迷城
- Hanyu Pinyin: Xuě Yù Mí Chéng
- Genre: Fantasy, action
- Written by: Wang Hailin
- Directed by: Lai Shui-ching; Yu Ming-sang; Yang Zhiqian
- Presented by: You Xiaogang; Jiang Hongyu
- Starring: Vincent Zhao; Ning Jing
- Country of origin: China
- Original language: Mandarin
- No. of episodes: 42

Production
- Executive producers: Jiang Hongyu; Lai Shui-ching
- Producer: Chang Sha
- Production location: China
- Running time: 45 minutes per episode

Lost City in Snow Heaven, also known as Xue Yu Mi Cheng, is a 2005 Chinese fantasy-action television series directed by Lai Shui-ching, Yu Ming-sang and Yang Zhiqian, starring Vincent Zhao and Ning Jing in the leading roles. There is also a movie called “Lost City In Snow Heaven”. However, though 'Lost City In Snow Heaven' is marketed as a movie, it is in fact a scaled-down version of the Chinese television series.

== Plot ==
Eighteen years ago, the last battle in an era of witchcraft and sorcery took place. The Emperor leads his army to invade the Hanhai tribe in the desert in an attempt to pave a road for his conquest of the southern territories. To prevent the invaders from gaining ground, Yeyue, Hanhai's head priestess, has no choice but to use the power of the Dark Chalice to summon forth the spirits of the dead soldiers of Hanhai to defend their homeland. Yeyue succeeds in her plan but loses control of the Dark Chalice. The Emperor breaks into the shrine where the Dark Chalice is held and experiences a vision of his younger brother, Chongguang, rebelling against him and seizing control of his empire. Yeyue, on the other hand, sees that Emperor's wife will give birth to a baby girl. The Emperor's wife orders her close aide Yang An to bring the infant princess Leng Yun to Snow City to escape from Chongguang's pursuit. Leng Yun grows up to find that she has magical healing powers thanks to the gift of calling upon butterfly-pixies.

== Cast ==
- Vincent Zhao as Lei Ou
- Ning Jing as Leng Yun
- Liu Dekai as Emperor Chongguang
- Shi Yanfei as Wuyang
- Allen Ting as Nalong
- Bao Jianfeng as Najialuo
- Kou Zhenhai as Ke'erte leader
- Zhang Danlu as Cuixin
- Yue Yueli as Chief Pang
- Xu Shouqin as Dibao
- Du Ninglin as Empress Dowager
- Jiang Hong as Die'er
- Wu Yijiang as Xin Da
- Du Jian as Nima
- Chae Rim as Empress
- Wu Ma as Yang An
- Zhang Hengping as Gaya
