= Liang Jing (actress) =

Chinese actress

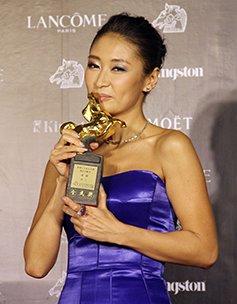
- Liang in 2012
- Born: July 17, 1973 (age 53); Fuzhou, Fujian, China
- Spouse: Guan Hu (m. 2005)
- Children: 2

Chinese name
- Traditional Chinese: 梁靜
- Simplified Chinese: 梁静
Transcriptions
Standard Mandarin
- Hanyu Pinyin: Liáng Jìng

Liang Jing (born July 17, 1973) is a Chinese actress.

== Film ==
- Drunken Hero (2002)
- Sunflower (2005)
- Karmic Mahjong (2006)
- All Apologies (2012)
- The Chef, the Actor, the Scoundrel (2013)
- Journey (2015)
- Mr. Six (2015)
- The New Year's Eve of Old Lee (2016)
- Run for Love (2016)
- S.M.A.R.T. Chase (2017)
- The Secret of Immortal Code (2018)
- The Island (2018)
- My People, My Country (2019)
- The Eight Hundred (2019)
- A Song Sung Blue (2023)
