= Joel Cohen (writer) =

American screenwriter (born 1963)

- Born: Joel Cohen; August 23, 1963 (age 63); Manhattan, New York, U.S.
- Education: State University of New York
- Occupation: Screenwriter
- Years active: 1983–present
- Notable work: Toy Story; Cheaper by the Dozen; Evan Almighty

Joel Cohen (born August 23, 1963) is an American screenwriter who has worked on projects such as the movies Cheaper by the Dozen, Toy Story, Money Talks and Garfield: The Movie. He frequently works with his writing partner Alec Sokolow.

Along with Joss Whedon, Andrew Stanton, John Lasseter, Pete Docter, Joe Ranft, and Sokolow, Cohen was nominated in 1996 for the Academy Award for Best Writing (Original Screenplay) for his work on Toy Story. Beyond writing, Cohen and Sokolow jointly directed Monster Mash: The Movie (1995) and executive produced Gnomes and Trolls: The Secret Chamber (2008).

== Selected writing credits ==
=== Films ===
- Hot Money (1986)
- Sister, Sister (1987) (with Bill Condon and Ginny Cerrella)
- Pass the Ammo (1988) (with Neil Cohen)
- Toy Story (1995) (with Joss Whedon, Andrew Stanton and Alec Sokolow)
- Monster Mash: The Movie (1995) (with Alec Sokolow, also directed)
- Money Talks (1997) (with Alec Sokolow)
- Goodbye Lover (1998) (with Ron Peer and Alec Sokolow)
- Cheaper by the Dozen (2003) (with Sam Harper and Alec Sokolow)
- Garfield: The Movie (2004) (with Alec Sokolow)
- Garfield: A Tail of Two Kitties (2006) (with Alec Sokolow)
- Evan Almighty (2007) (story credit with Steve Oedekerk and Alec Sokolow)
- Daddy Day Camp (2007) (story credit with Geoff Rodkey and Alec Sokolow)
- Gnomes and Trolls: The Secret Chamber (2008) (with Salvatore Cardoni and Alec Sokolow)
- The Inseparables (2023)

=== Video games ===
- Freaky Flyers (2003)
- Skylanders: Spyro's Adventure (2011) (with Alec Sokolow and Marianne Krawczyk)
