= Justin Quek =

Singaporean chef (born 1962)

Justin Quek (Chinese: 郭文秀; pinyin: Guō Wénxìu; Peng'im: Guag⁴ Bhung⁵siu³, born on 30 March 1962 in Singapore) is a Singaporean chef. His specialty is in Franco-Asian cuisine. He is Singapore's most internationally known chef and the first Asian chef invited to participate in Lufthansa's Star Chefs program.

== Early life ==
Quek is Teochew and his family business in the past was a fruit stall in Queen Street. His father died when he was seven. He has 11 other siblings and he attended Broadrick Secondary School.

== Career ==
Quek had always wanted to travel. At 20 years old, he got a job as a steward. It was after two years as a seaman that led him to his passion of cooking.

Quek trained at Mandarin Oriental, Singapore to be a chef and was sponsored by them to attend the Singapore Hotel and Tourism Education Center. After graduation in 1986, Quek worked at Mandarin Oriental, Bangkok for a year before returning to the Singapore hotel to work at Fourchette under chef Bertrand Langlet. Langlet left Fourchette for Delifrance Bistro and Quek followed him and became the head chef there. Langlet encouraged Quek to go to France to further his training. After two years at Delifrance Bistro, Quek, in 1991, used his life savings of $40,000 to travel to France to improve his skills. He worked at some of the restaurants there and went to London to train under Michel and Albert Roux at Le Gavroche.

Quek returned to Singapore after a year and became the personal chef at the French Embassy, serving two high commissioners.

In 1994, restaurateur and sommelier Ignatius Chan and Quek opened Les Amis at Shaw House, Singapore with backing from stockbroker Desmond Lim and Chong Yap Seng. Quek, along with Chan, left Les Amis in 2003, citing personal reasons.

In 2004, Quek moved to Taipei, Taiwan and opened a restaurant, La Petite Cuisine. He had also opened another French eatery La Platane, a fine-dining Chinese restaurant Villa du Lac and a restaurant named Fountain. All three are located at Xintiandi, Shanghai. He sold all businesses in Shanghai in January 2009. Opened Just In Bistro & Wine Bar, Taipei in April 2009, and fine-dining French restaurant Justin's Signatures in Dec 2009. He sold all business in Taipei in 2013.

As of 2010, Quek was also a consultant to Whisk, The Mira Hong Kong and The French Window, IFC Hong Kong.

In 2010, Quek returned to Singapore and opened a restaurant, Sky On 57, at Marina Bay Sands. The restaurant offered Franco-Asian cuisine and a view of the Singapore skyline. Sky on 57 was closed in June 2017.

In 2018, Quek opened two restaurants at Marina Bay Sands, Justin – Flavours of Asia and Chinoiserie. The former is a casual all-day-dining restaurant while the latter is a fine-dining restaurant. Justin – Flavours of Asia was closed in 2023 but was reopened at Lotte Department Store in Seoul on 3 December the same year. The restaurant was a joint venture between Quek and Korean food-and-beverage accelerator company SPBT, a partner of Lotte Department Store .

In 2023, Quek opened an eponymous eatery, JUSTIN, at Tangs at Tangs Plaza, Orchard on 8 August with the official opening on 16 August. The eatery was also the first Singapore flagship store for Australian coffee brand Vittoria Coffee.

Quek had served Bill Gates, former Chinese president Jiang Zemin, and also Lee Kuan Yew whom Quek served 21 birthday dinners for him.

== Personal life ==
In 2005, Quek was convicted of drink driving in 2005.

On 6 August 2009, Quek was caught drunk driving. In June 2010, Quek was jailed for two weeks, fined S$6,300 for drink driving and banned from driving all vehicles for four years. Quek was also driving without a licence and proper insurance coverage.

== Awards ==
- 2001: Best Chef of the Year at the inaugural World Gourmet Summit (WGS) Awards.
- 2003: San Pellegrino Chef of the Year.
- 2004:
  - San Pellegrino Chef of the Year.
  - Lifetime Achievement Award at the 8th Annual New World Food and Wine Festival.
- 2005: At-Sunrice GlobalChef Award.
- 2009: World Gourmet Summit Award of Excellence Hall of Fame Best chef.
