= Cold Steel (2011 film) =

- Film poster
- Directed by: David Wu
- Written by: David Wu
- Produced by: Yu Rui-Jin; Xu Wen-Cai; Liu Zhi Jiang
- Starring: Tony Leung Ka-Fai; Peter Ho; Song Jia; Yu Rongguang; Angeles Woo
- Cinematography: Horace Wong
- Edited by: David Wu
- Music by: Lawrence Shragge
- Release date: 2 December 2011
- Running time: 101 minutes
- Country: China
- Languages: Mandarin; Japanese

Cold Steel (Chinese: 遍地狼烟) is a Chinese action film directed by David Wu. It was originally titled Bian di lang yan and was released in Hong Kong on December 2, 2011.

== Cast ==
- Tony Leung Ka-Fai
- Peter Ho
- Song Jia
- Yu Rongguang
- Angeles Woo
