= Shatec Institutes =

Hospitality school in Singapore

Coordinates: 1.3437°N 103.7501°E

- Type: Private
- Established: 1983
- Chief Executive: Margaret Heng
- Location: Singapore
- Campus: 9 Jurong Town Hall Rd, #02-05, Singapore 609431
- Website: shatec.sg

The Shatec Institutes, formerly known as Singapore Hotel Association Training and Education Centre (Shatec), was set up in 1983 by the Singapore Hotel Association to equip Singapore's hospitality industry with a skilled workforce. It also has a training restaurant, The Sapling Restaurant, for its students.

== History ==
In 1982, Singapore Hotel Association planned to set up Shatec with École hôtelière de Lausanne to provide a diploma course in hotel management in Singapore. Courses were expected to start in June 1983.

Initially located around Nassim Hill during establishment, it moved to Mount Sophia in the 1990s. It finally moved to Bukit Batok around the year 2000.

In 2008, during its 25th anniversary celebration, Shatec announced that it would be rebranded as Shatec institutes. Seven new institutes would be established, including an Institute for Hosting.

== Schools and departments ==
- Hospitality and Tourism
- Culinary
- Pastry and Bakery

== Notable alumni ==
- Ben Yeo, actor and host.
- May Phua, actress and host
- Pierre Png, actor
- Justin Quek, chef
