= Peter Ho =

American-Chinese singer, actor, producer and director

- 何潤東
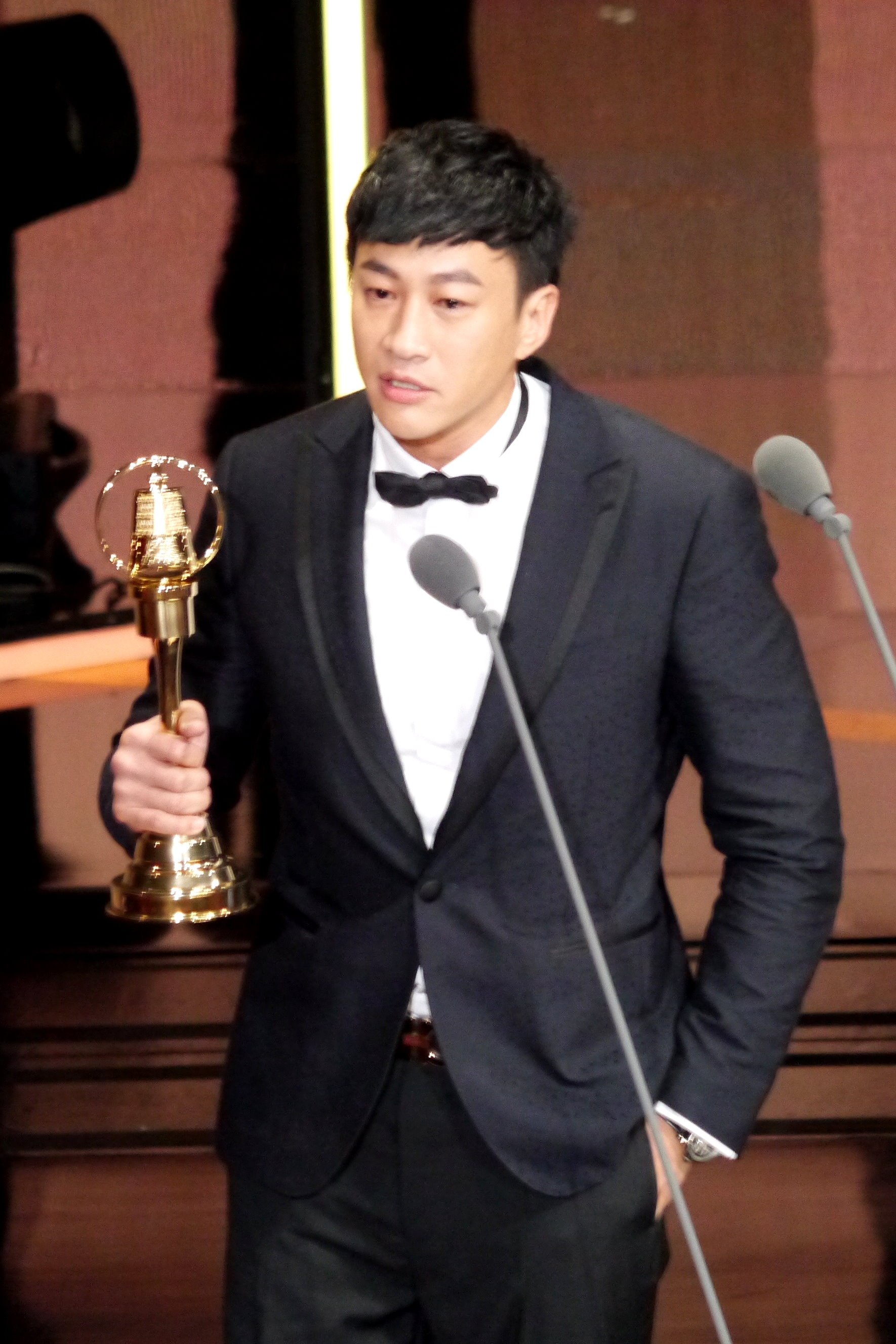
- Ho in Golden Bell Awards 2018
- Born: September 13, 1975 (age 51); Los Angeles, California, U.S.
- Citizenship: Canadian
- Education: Ontario College of Art and Design
- Occupations: Actor; Singer; Model; Producer
- Years active: 1994–present
- Agent: Hesong Media
- Spouse: Peggy Lin (m. 2016)
- Children: 0

Chinese name
- Traditional Chinese: 何潤東
- Simplified Chinese: 何润东
Transcriptions
Standard Mandarin
- Hanyu Pinyin: Hé Rùndōng
Yue: Cantonese
- Jyutping: Ho4 Jeon6 Dung1
Southern Min
- Hokkien POJ: Hô Jūn-tong
- Musical career
- Genre: Mandopop
- Label: Darton Entertainment

Peter Ho (Chinese: 何潤東, born September 13, 1975) is an American-born Canadian singer, actor, producer and director active in East Asia. He is known for his roles in TV series Wind and Cloud, One Meter Sunshine, Goddess of Mercy, The Young Warriors, Three Kingdoms, King's War, Summer's Desire, Nothing Gold Can Stay, and in films Kamen Rider 555: Paradise Lost and Sword Master.

== Career ==
Ho was born in the United States to Hong Kong parents, but he was raised in Canada and Taiwan. He studied at Ontario College of Art and Design, and began his singing career after being offered a record deal in a karaoke bar. In 1998, he released his debut album Miss You Love in Taiwan. Since 2000, he shifted his career focus to acting in East Asia.

== Personal life ==
Ho has stated that he has been in four relationships, but has only publicly acknowledged two: singer and actress Jessica Song and his current wife, Peggy. He and Song were in a relationship for nearly two years before her entrée into the entertainment industry. However, due to strong opposition from Ho’s management company and prolonged periods of separation, Song eventually initiated the breakup. Ho married Taiwanese saleswoman-turned-designer Peggy Lin in 2016. After the marriage, Lin became a model and influencer. In 2018, Lin acted in the Ho-directed TV series Age of Rebellion.

== Filmography ==
=== Film ===
Year	English Title	Chinese Title	Role	Notes
1994	The Lovers	梁祝	Ting Mong-chun	
1999	The Truth About Jane and Sam	真心话	Sam	
1999	Deja Vu	缘，妙不可言	Peter Ho	
2000	When I Fall in Love With Both	月亮的秘密	Sam Ho	
2000	Dark War	暗斗	Ken Tsui	
2000	Born to Be King	古惑仔6之胜者为王	Lui Fu-kwan	
2002	T.R.Y	T.R.Y. 军火	Xiao Ding	
2003	Secret Pursuit	密情追踪	Mai Long	
2003	Kamen Rider 555: Paradise Lost	剧场版 假面ライダー555 パラダイス・ロスト	Leo/Kamen Rider Psyga	
2005	One Missed Call 2	着信アリ2	Chen Yuting	
2007	My DNA Says I Love You	基因决定我爱你	Anteater	
2009	Sophie's Revenge	非常完美	Gordon	
2010	My Belle Boss	我的美女老板	Yang Xiong	
2011	Once Upon a Time in Tibet	西藏往事	Jiang Cuo	Guest appearance
2011	Cold Steel	遍地狼烟	Mu Liangfeng	
2014	The Monkey King	西游記之大鬧天宮	Erlang Shen	
2014	Fighting	英雄之戰	Jie Sen	
2014	One Minute More	只要一分鐘	Shen Haojie	
2016	Spicy Hot in Love	爱情麻辣烫之情定终身	Liu Jiayi	
2016	Brothers	鋼刀	Wang Bingsheng	
2016	Murder at Honeymoon Hotel	蜜月酒店殺人事件	Doctor Cui	
2016	The Precipice Game	魔輪	Ye Qing / Ye Tian	
2016	Sword Master	三少爺的劍	Yan Shisan	
2017	The Game Changer	遊戲規則	Lin Zihao	
2018	Back to the Good Times	花甲大人轉男孩		
2018	Crazy Little Thing	為你寫詩		Cameo
2018	Kung Fu Monster	武林怪獸		
2019	Double World	征途	Chu Hun	

=== Television series ===
Year	English Title	Chinese Title	Role	Notes/Ref.
2001	Crouching Tiger, Hidden Dragon	卧虎藏龙	Luo Xiaohu	
2002	Wind and Cloud	风云雄霸天下	Bu Jingyun	
2003	Miracle	奇迹	Zhao Chengzhen	
2003	Starry Starry Night	雪地里的星星	Peter	
2003	Eighteen Monks	十八罗汉	Huihai	
2003	Youjian Juhua Xiang	又见橘花香	Aquarium owner	Cameo
2003	Jade Goddess of Mercy	玉观音	Mao Jie	
2003	One Meter Sunshine	一米阳光	Jin Zhengwu	
2003	Four Marshals	少年四大名捕	Zhuiming	
2003	Original Scent of Summer	原味的夏天	Peter	Cameo
2004	Love of the Aegean Sea	情定爱情海	Li Yaoxiang	
2004	Assassinator Jing Ke	荆轲传奇	Gao Jianli	
2004	Wind and Cloud 2	风云2	Bu Jingyun	
2004	The Prince of Qin, Li Shimin	秦王李世民	Li Shimin	
2005	Acquired Beauty	后天美女	Doctor Lu	Cameo
2005	Cooking Master Boy	中华小当家	Ah Fei	
2005	The Legend of Hero	中华英雄	Hua Yingxiong	
2005	Phantom Lover	夜半歌声	Song Danping	
2005	Ping Pong	乒乓	Lin Yun	Cameo
2005	Wind Warrior	风中战士	Jiang Peng	Cameo
2005	Romance in the White House	白屋之恋	Yin Tong	
2005	Fairy Tale of Paris	巴黎童话	Qi Xiang	
2006	The Blind Detective	盲侠金鱼飞天猪	Nangong Jin	
2006	The Young Warriors	少年杨家将	Yang Yanhui	
2006	The Legend of Lu Xiaofeng	陆小凤传奇	Ximen Chuixue	
2007	Men and Legends	精武飞鸿	Di Feng	
2007	Butterfly Lovers	梁山伯与祝英台	Liang Shanbo	
2008	Shanghai Typhoon	上海潮	Cao Fei	
2010	Three Kingdoms	三国	Lü Bu	
2010	Summer's Desire	泡沫之夏	Ou Chen	also producer
2010	Unbeatable	无懈可击之美女如云	Zhuo Yuan	
2011	Wish Upon a Star	星愿同行	Yi Kewei	
2011	Ring Ring Bell	真心请按两次铃	Ren Jiakai	
2012	Drama Go! Go! Go!	姐姐立正向前走	Ou Yangcheng	Cameo
2012	Of Love and Rain	晴雨之間	Lee	
2012	King's War	楚汉传奇	Xiang Yu	
2013	Unconditional Love	乐俊凯	Le Junkai	Web series
2013	Shining Days	璀璨人生	Zhang HeFan	
2014	Tiny Times	小時代	Gong Ming	
2015	Furong Jin	芙蓉锦	Gao Chongqi	
2015	Immediately The World	马上天下	Chen Sanchuan	
2015	Beautiful Secret	美丽的秘密	Guan Yi	
2016	The Tibet Code	藏地密码	Zhuomu Qiangba	Web series
2016	Princess Of Lanling King	兰陵王妃	Wu Mingqie	Cameo
2017	Nothing Gold Can Stay	那年花开月正圆	Wu Pin	
2017	Xuan Wu	玄武	Li Hengli	
2017	As Flowers Fade and Fly Across the Sky	花謝花飛花滿天	Hua Maintain	
2018	Age Of Rebellion	翻牆的記憶	Gao Yi	Director/Screenwriter
2019	Beautiful Reborn Flower	彼岸花	Han Lin	
2019	Sword Dynasty	剑王朝	Wang Jingmeng	
2019	Teresa Teng	邓丽君之我只在乎你	Wang Zhongwen	
2019	Standardized Life	标化人生	Wen Zhe	
2020	Sui Sui Qing Lian	岁岁青莲	He Lianxin	
2021	Huan Xi Sha	浣溪沙	Fu Chai	
2022	Side Story of Fox Volant	飞狐外传	Tian Gui Nong	
2025	The Prisoner of Beauty	折腰	Gao Heng	cameo
2026	A Controversial Entertainer	男公馆	Yu Ge	cameo
2026	Blossoms of Power	百花杀	Shen Yueshan	
2026	Key to the Phoenix Heart	雀骨	Xie Huaigui	
2026	The Swords	剑来	Song Changjing	

== Discography ==
=== Albums ===
Year	English Title	Chinese Title	Notes
1998	Start of a Dream	梦想的开始	Studio album
1998	Thoughts of Your Love	想你的爱	
1999	Truth	真心话	OST
1999	What Can I Do Without You	没有我你怎么办	
1999	HEY! LOVER	—N/a	Studio album
2000	Everytime Remember You	每次想到你	
2003	Dear Friends	亲爱的朋友	
2007	Black Wings	黑色翅膀	Single
2007	Wanna Tell You	好想对你说	Studio album
2008	I Only Care For You	我只在乎你	Single
2009	Love Me Again Please	再爱我好吗	Single
2009	Can't Hide	躲不了	
2009	Lovers' Song	恋人唱的歌	
2009	Imagination	想像	
2010	I Remember I've Loved	我记得我爱过	Studio album

=== Singles ===
Year	English title	Chinese title	Album	Notes
1998	"Two Person's World"	兩人世界	Don't Wear High Heels	with Shirley Yee
2005	"Die for Love"	殉情	Phantom Lover OST	
2005	"In Love With Each Other"	相愛	Phantom Lover OST	
2005	"Plucking Stars"	摘星	Starry Starry Night OST	with Tammy Chen
2005	"Song of Wind"	風之舞	Wind Warrior OST	with Gregory Wong, Roy Chiu and Zhong Yaokang
2005	"Romance in the White House"	白屋之戀	Romance in the White House OST	
2008	"Qing Guo Qing Cheng"	傾國傾城	—N/a	Theme song of CCTV program 《傾國傾城》
2008	"Let The World Be Filled With Love	讓世界充滿愛	—N/a	with various artists; for earthquake charity relief
2008	"Welcome to Beijing"	北京歡迎你	—N/a	with various artists; promotional song for 2008 Beijing Olympics
2009	"Smile and Say Hello"	微笑說你好	—N/a	with Vivian Hsu; promotional song for 2010 Shanghai World Expo
2010	"Just Be Fine"	好好就好	My Belle Boss OST	with Jing Tian
2010	"Pretense"	假面	Summer's Desire OST	
2010	"I Remember I've Loved "	我記得我愛過(宿命版)	Summer's Desire OST	
2011	"Next Year's Valentine's Day"	明年情人節	Ring Ring Bell OST	with Della Ding
2011	"End of a Rainbow"	彩虹的盡頭	Cold Steel OST	
2012	"Life of an Overlord"	霸王命	King's War OST	
2013	"Regret"	遺憾	Unconditional Love OST	
2013	"Wake Up Love"	叫醒愛	Shining Days OST	
2014	"Havoc in the Heavenly Realms"	大鬧天宮	—N/a	Theme song of mobile game 《大鬧天宮HD》
2014	"Leptis"	萊普帝斯LEPTIS	Dream Attraction OST	
2015	"A Love That is Realised Eventually"	後知後覺的愛	Beautiful Secret OST	
2015	"Kai Yun Zhang"	關雲長	—N/a	Theme song of mobile game 《關雲長》

== Awards and nominations ==
Year	Award	Category	Nominated work	Result
1999	RTHK Top 10 Gold Songs Awards	Best New Male Prospect Award (Bronze)	—N/a	Won
2004	4th China Television Arts Festival for "Top Ten Best"	Top Ten Best Actors	One Meter Sunshine	Won
2007	5th Southeast Music Chart Awards	All-Rounded Artist Award	—N/a	Won
2008	Music Radio China Top Chart Awards	Campus Favorite Award (Solo)	—N/a	Won
2010	Metro Radio Mandarin Hits Music Awards Presentation	Asia Popular Idol Award	—N/a	Won
2010	Metro Radio Mandarin Hits Music Awards Presentation	Mandarin Hit Songs	"I Remember I've Loved"	Won
2010	8th Southeast Music Chart Awards	Most Popular Singer	—N/a	Won
2010	4th Huading Awards	Best Cross-over Artist	—N/a	Won
2011	15th Chinese Music Awards	Best TV Actor (Hong Kong/Taiwan)	—N/a	Won
2011	Metro Radio Mandarin Hits Music Awards Presentation	Asia Popular Idol Award	—N/a	Won
2011	Metro Radio Mandarin Hits Music Awards Presentation	Mandarin Hit Songs	"Walking Alone"	Won
2014	1st Hengdian Film and TV Festival of China	Best Actor	King's War	Won
2018	53rd Golden Bell Awards	Best Directing for a TV Series	Age of Rebellion	Won
2018	53rd Golden Bell Awards	Best Writing for a TV Series	Age of Rebellion	Nominated
2018	53rd Golden Bell Awards	Best TV Series	Age of Rebellion	Nominated
2018	23rd Asian Television Awards	Best Actor	Age of Rebellion	Nominated
