= Sparkling Red Star (2007 film) =

2007 Chinese film

- Movie poster
- Directed by: Dante Lam
- Written by: Xie Jichang
- Based on: Sparkling Red Star
- Production company: Puzzle Animation Studio Bayi Film Studio
- Distributed by: Asia Animation Ltd.
- Release dates: 1 October 2007 (China); 18 October 2007 (Hong Kong)
- Running time: 84 minutes
- Country: China
- Language: Mandarin
- Budget: 2 million USD +

Sparkling Red Star (Chinese: 闪闪的红星 孩子的天空) is a 2007 Chinese animated film produced by Puzzle Animation Studio Limited in collaboration with the Bayi Film Studio of the People's Liberation Army. It is an animated remake of the 1974 children's propaganda film Sparkling Red Star, which was made during the Cultural Revolution. The film concerns a boy who helps the Red Army fight a greedy landlord in his village.

== Story ==
The story is set in 1937 against the background of the Red Army's Long March. In Liuxi Village in Jiangxi, an innocent and cheerful child, Pan Dongzi (潘东子), spends his carefree childhood. However, after reaching 10 years of age, he begins to experience the sorrows and joys of life.

Pan's father is a Red Army sympathizer. He, along with other villagers, have been partitioning grain harvests out into two sections, one to be handed over to the landlord, the other to be saved for the Red Army, who are due to pass through their village. Hu Hansan, the tyrannical landlord of the village, finds out about this, and Pan's father is captured. The Red Guards of the Red Army show up just in time to save Pan's father, and in return Pan begins to worship Xiuzhu, the Captain of Red Guards. The villagers of Liuxi Village enjoyed a period of happiness under the protection of the Red Guards.

When the Red Army has to leave on the Long March, Pan's father goes with them. Before leaving, Pan's father give him a red star badge as a symbol of encouragement. Only a few members of the Red Guard remain stationed in Liuxi Village. Hu, the landlord, hires a number of cold-blooded killers and occupies Liuxi Village. Pan and his mother flee and follow the Red Guards.

After regaining control over the village, Hu plans to make a profit by buying and selling weapons, presumably to the enemies of the Red Army, though it's not clearly stated. The remaining Red Guards in Liuxi feel this poses a great threat to the Red Guards on the frontlines, and decide they need to destroy Hu's radio so he can longer contact his suppliers or buyers. Pan sneaks into Hu's quarters and steals the radio, but he inadvertently leads Hu and his henchmen to the Red Guard hideout.

A fight breaks out between the Red Guards and Hu and his men. Pan's mother, joining the Red Guards in fight, is shot and killed. Pan strives to become stronger, and gradually becomes a tough person and A passionate young man.

== Production ==
The film is a remake of a classic Chinese children's propaganda film of the same name made in 1974. The production cost was more than US$2 million and was a collaboration between the Bayi film studio of the People's Liberation Army and Puzzle Animation Studio Limited, a Shenzhen animation studio led by Hong Kong businessman Chin Yiu-tong. According to Chin, he funded the project because he "wanted to do something for Chinese animation."

The filmmakers did not make the theme as politically revolutionary as the original film, and chose to focus more on family and friendship, although there are still numerous propagandistic elements. The pop duo Twins featured on the Cantonese version of the movie soundtrack.

The animation was mostly hand-drawn and had a running time of 84 minutes. It was released on October 1 in mainland China, and on October 18 in Hong Kong.

== Reception and analysis ==
Its distribution company, Asia Animation Limited, was awarded a Certificate of Merit in the Best Digital Entertainment (Digital Animation) Award category by the Hong Kong Digital Entertainment Association in 2007.

According to a 2011 paper by Luke Robinson, the remake treats its audience of Chinese children as a consumer and is a commercialized version of the original, which was politically pedagogical in nature and treated the child as a potential political agent.
