= Invincible Knights Errant =

Chinese television series

- Promotional poster
- 七俠五義人間道; Qī Xiá Wǔ Yì Rén Jiān Dào
- Genre: wuxia gong'an fiction historical fiction crime fiction
- Written by: Feng Hai; Shi Hang; Ma Lin
- Directed by: Raymond Lee Wai-man; Bai Yunmo
- Starring: Alex Man; Vincent Zhao; Wang Tonghui; Xu Qiwen
- Opening theme: "Tiān Zài Kàn" (天在看) performed by Wang Xiyi
- Ending theme: "Kè Mèng" (客夢) performed by Wakin Chau
- Composers: Li Xun; Ding Doudou
- Country of origin: China
- Original language: Mandarin
- No. of episodes: 37

Production
- Running time: 45 minutes/episode
- Production company: Beijing Golden Skyway Media

Invincible Knights Errant
- Traditional Chinese: 七俠五義人間道
- Simplified Chinese: 七侠五义人间道
Transcriptions
Standard Mandarin
- Hanyu Pinyin: Qī Xiá Wǔ Yì Rén Jiān Dào
- Wade–Giles: Ch'i^{1} Hsia^{2} Wu^{3} I^{4} Jen^{2} Chien^{1} Tao^{4}
Yue: Cantonese
- Jyutping: Cat^{1} Haap^{6} Ng^{5} Ji^{6} Jan^{4} Gaan^{1} Dou^{3}

Invincible Knights Errant is a 2011 martial arts television series from Mainland China, based on the wuxia classics The Seven Heroes and Five Gallants. The show stars Alex Man as Bao Zheng from China's Song dynasty and Vincent Zhao as Zhan Zhao.

== Cast ==
- Alex Man as Bao Zheng
- Vincent Zhao as Zhan Zhao
- Wang Tonghui as Bai Yutang
- Xu Qiwen as Xiao Jing
- Qin Yan as Chen Lin
- Huo Zhengyan as Emperor Renzong of Song
- Fu Yiwei as Empress Dowager Liu
- Liu Weihua as Lu Fang
- Chen Chuhan as Han Zhang
- Chen Xiaofei as Jiang Ping
- Sui Shuyang as Xu Qing
- Zhao Chulun as Ding Zhaohui
- Ma Xiaojun as Ai Hu
- Chen Yun as Qin E
- Zhang Heng as Tang Juan
- Kou Zhenhai as Pang Ji
- Liu Naiyi as Ding Zhaolan
- Mou Fengbin as Zhi Hua
- Wu Qianqian as Consort Li

== International broadcast ==
It first aired in Thailand on Channel 7 beginning September 13, 2013 on Wednesdays to Fridays at 8:30 a.m.
