= A Song Sung Blue =

2023 Chinese film

- Film poster
- Chinese: 小白船
- Directed by: Geng Zihan
- Written by: Liu Yining
- Produced by: Jane Zheng
- Starring: Zhou Meijun; Huang Ziqi; Liang Jing; Liang Long
- Cinematography: Hao Jiayue
- Edited by: Matthieu Laclau; Tsai Yann-Shan
- Music by: Hank Lee
- Production company: The Seventh Art Pictures
- Release date: 23 May 2023 (Cannes)
- Running time: 92 minutes
- Country: China
- Languages: Mandarin; Korean; French

A Song Sung Blue (Chinese: 小白船, Xiǎo bái chuán) is a 2023 Chinese coming-of-age drama film directed by Geng Zihan, with the screenplay written by Liu Yining. It stars Zhou Meijun and Huang Ziqi. The film had its world premiere in the Directors' Fortnight at the 2023 Cannes Film Festival.

== Plot ==
Xian is a 15-year-old girl who is sent to live with her estranged father in Harbin after her mother takes a job in Africa. Xian develops a romantic attraction towards Mingmei, the daughter of her father's current girlfriend.

== Cast ==
- Ζhou Meijun as Liu Xian
- Huang Ziqi as Jin Mingmei
- Liang Jing as Xian's mother
- Liang Long as Xian's father

== Production ==
Geng's directorial debut, the film was made as her graduation project from the Central Academy of Drama.

== Release ==
A Song Sung Blue premiered in the Directors' Fortnight program at the 2023 Cannes Film Festival, where it was in competition for the Caméra d'Or and the Queer Palm. It was later screened at the Pingyao International Film Festival, where Geng won the award for Best Director.

== Critical response ==
John Berra of Screen Daily wrote that "Geng Zihan’s bittersweet debut feature A Song Sung Blue could easily be summarised as another wispy coming-of-age drama in which a young person’s life is forever changed by the events of one particular summer. Its slight narrative concerning the romantic yearnings of a teenage girl certainly fits neatly into that template, while hazy atmospherics bathe the proceedings in the anticipated pained nostalgia for the recent past. Yet this delicate affair lingers longer than one might expect, as Geng’s sensitive direction of Liu Yining’s nuanced screenplay imbues familiar tropes with a fresh perspective. It also benefits greatly from Zhou Meijun’s lead performance which provides a palpable undercurrent of ennui that is entirely in keeping with the melancholic title."

== Awards ==
Hao Jiayue received an Asia Pacific Screen Award nomination for Best Cinematography at the 16th Asia Pacific Screen Awards.
