= Drunken Hero =

2002 Chinese TV series

- VCD cover art
- Also known as: Drunk Kungfu Master
- 大醉侠
- Genre: Wuxia
- Written by: Huang Jincang; Lin Yuefang
- Directed by: Su Yuanfeng; Qiu Yinghong
- Starring: Vincent Zhao; Max Mok; Kristy Yang; Yang Ruoxi
- Opening theme: "The Flower is Too Fragrant" (花太香) by Richie Ren
- Country of origin: China
- Original language: Mandarin
- No. of episodes: 40

Production
- Executive producer: Chen Weili
- Producer: Lee Kang-sheng
- Production location: China
- Running time: ≈45 minutes per episode

Original release
- Network: TVB Jade

Drunken Hero (大醉侠) is a 2002 Chinese wuxia television series starring Vincent Zhao, Max Mok, Kristy Yang, and Yang Ruoxi. It is about a pair of twin brothers who were separated at birth, raised differently, and forced to become rivals.

== Synopsis ==
Wentian and Wanxin are the sons of the Jianwen Emperor of the Ming dynasty. They were separated at birth when their father was overthrown in a coup. Before disappearing, the emperor had forced Wentian and Wanxin to consume the magical water and fire orbs respectively, and ordered his bodyguards to take the boys out of the palace. During the chaos, Wanxin was seized by the eunuch Chu Tianxing, while Wentian was delivered to safety by Mi Jiutou, one of the bodyguards.

Wentian was raised by Mi Jiutou, growing up to become a gregarious and righteous martial artist. On the other hand, Wanxin, who was raised and trained as Chu Tianxing's godson, develops a cruel and power-hungry personality under his evil godfather's influence. The orbs in their bodies often cause them to experience strange fits of agony — Wentian suffers from chills while Wanxin feels like he is on fire. However, their neigong have also increased due to the orbs' power.

Wentian and Wanxin meet each other by chance and become sworn brothers without knowing each other's true identity. They also both fall in love with Bai Yutong, a maiden who secretly robs the rich to help the poor. Xiaowan, Mi Jiutou's daughter, is also in love with Wentian. Wentian and Wanxin eventually realise that they are actually brothers.

In a dramatic twist of events, Wanxin is castrated and gradually becomes consumed by his darker personality. After Chu Tianxing is killed, Wanxin takes his godfather's place. Meanwhile, Wentian masters a set of martial arts based on different styles of Drunken Fist, each style named after an alcoholic drink. The warm effect of alcohol helps him to suppress the cool energy from the water orb, relieving him of his agony. He roams the jianghu to fight injustice and help the poor, earning himself the nickname "Drunken Hero". In the finale, Wentian faces Wanxin in a fight to put an end to his brother's rampage.

== Cast ==
- Vincent Zhao as Wentian
- Kristy Yang as Bai Yutong
- Max Mok as Wanxin
- Yang Ruoxi as Mi Xiaowan
- Li Yongyong as Honggu
- Dong Xiaoyan as Hua Nongying / Yu Linglong
- Yu Yuexian as Hua Canyi
- Jia Yiping as Tong Buda
- Liang Jing as Shui Linling
- Zhu Yana as Hua Kui
- Zhang Wei as Chu Tianxing
- Xie Yunshan as Choupidan
