= Fist Power =

2000 Hong Kong film by Aman Chang

- DVD cover
- 生死拳速
- Directed by: Aman Chang
- Written by: Aman Chang
- Produced by: Wong Jing
- Starring: Vincent Zhao; Anthony Wong; Gigi Lai; Sam Lee
- Cinematography: Choi Shung-fai
- Edited by: Marco Mak
- Music by: Tommy Wai; Samuel Leung
- Production companies: Jing's Production; Win's Entertainment
- Distributed by: China Star Entertainment Group
- Release date: 21 January 2000
- Running time: 92 minutes
- Country: Hong Kong
- Language: Cantonese
- Box office: HK$771,235

Fist Power is a 2000 Hong Kong action film directed by Aman Chang, starring Vincent Zhao, Anthony Wong, Gigi Lai, and Sam Lee. Shooting for the film took place in Hong Kong between February and March 1999. The film was released in Hong Kong on 21 January 2000.

== Synopsis ==
Brian, a security specialist and martial arts teacher, visits his family in Hong Kong and helps to send his nephew to school.

Shortly after that, Charles, a disgruntled former British marine, takes the students hostage and plants bombs around the school. Charles is unhappy because his son was taken away by his ex-wife and her husband, who are leaving Hong Kong for the United States. He demands that his son be brought to him in exchange for the hostages.

Brian agrees to bring Charles's son to him. With help from Simna, Charles's brother-in-law, and Hung, a reporter, he rushes to the airport to find Charles's son.

Even after they find the boy, all is not over yet because their return journey is filled with danger. Both the police and the thugs – including a hired killer – are out to get them.

== Cast ==
- Vincent Zhao as Brian
- Anthony Wong as Charles
- Gigi Lai as Hung
- Sam Lee as Simna
- Cheng Pei-pei as Brian's mother
- Lau Kar-wing as Brian's father
- Kara Hui as Brian's sister
- Lung Fong as Chiu Chung-tin
- Jewel Lee as a killer
- Mak King-ting as Charles's ex-wife
- Wai Tin-chi as a killer
- Mak Tak-law as a killer
- Lam Suet as Fatty
- Jude Poyer as a killer
- Wu Chi-lung as Brian's brother-in-law

== Home media ==
On 19 March 2001, the DVD was released by Mia in the United Kingdom in Region 2. The DVD was released in Region 1 in the United States on 16 October 2001, it was distributed by Tai Seng.

== See also ==
- List of Hong Kong films
