= The Sino-Dutch War 1661 =

- DVD cover art
- 郑成功1661
- Directed by: Wu Ziniu
- Written by: Zhang Jiping
- Produced by: Li Ning
- Starring: Vincent Zhao; Jiang Qinqin; Du Zhiguo; Yoko Shimada; Xu Min; Zhang Shan
- Cinematography: Yi Huhewula
- Edited by: He Wenzhang
- Music by: Zhang Shaotong
- Production company: Fujian Film Studio
- Release date: 15 November 2001 (China)
- Running time: 101 minutes
- Country: China
- Language: Mandarin

The Sino-Dutch War 1661 (郑成功1661), also known as Hero Zheng Chenggong (英雄郑成功), is a 2001 Chinese historical film directed by Wu Ziniu, starring Vincent Zhao, Jiang Qinqin, Du Zhiguo, Yoko Shimada, Xu Min and Zhang Shan. The film is loosely based on the life of Zheng Chenggong and focuses on his battle with the Dutch East India Company for control of Taiwan at the Siege of Fort Zeelandia. The film was released in 2002 in Japan under the title Kokusenya Kassen (國姓爺合戰).

== Synopsis ==
In the mid-17th century, most of China has been conquered by the Manchu-led Qing dynasty after the collapse of the Ming dynasty. Ming remnants have fled south and established a Southern Ming regime based in Fujian, with the Longwu Emperor as their figurehead monarch. Qing forces are closing in on the territories under Southern Ming control.

Zheng Sen is the son of Zheng Zhilong, a former pirate who became a Ming general. Impressed with Zheng Sen's loyalty, the Longwu Emperor grants him the imperial family name, Zhu, and a new personal name, Chenggong (literally "success"). Zheng Sen is hence known as the Imperial Name-keeper or Zheng Chenggong.

Around the time, Taiwan has been colonised by the Dutch East India Company for over three decades and many people have signed a petition requesting Zheng Chenggong to help them take back Taiwan from the Dutch.

Zheng Zhilong defects to the Qing dynasty after seeing that he has no future in Southern Ming. Despite his father's betrayal, Zheng Chenggong remains loyal to the Longwu Emperor and continues to resist the Qing invaders after the fall of Southern Ming. He plans to retreat to Taiwan and establish a new base of operations there in preparation for retaking mainland China from the Qing dynasty.

In 1661, Zheng Chenggong's fleet sets sail from Xiamen to Taiwan. Nine months later, they defeat the Dutch at the Siege of Fort Zeelandia, forcing them to surrender and relinquish control of Taiwan.

== Cast ==
- Vincent Zhao as Zheng Chenggong
- Jiang Qinqin as Xue Liang
- Du Zhiguo as Zheng Zhilong
- Yoko Shimada as Tagawa Matsu
- Xu Min as the Longwu Emperor
- Zhang Shan as Li Wei
- Alexander de Zwager as Frederick Coyett

== Casting ==
Wu Ziniu originally had Hong Kong actor Tony Leung in mind for the role of Zheng Chenggong before Vincent Zhao took over.

== See also ==
- List of works about the Dutch East India Company
- Lord of Formosa
