= Sparkling Red Star =

- Film poster
- Traditional Chinese: 閃閃的紅星
- Simplified Chinese: 闪闪的红星
- Hanyu Pinyin: Shănshăn de hóngxīng
- Directed by: Li Jun; Li Ang
- Screenplay by: Lu Zhuguo; Wang Yuanjian
- Based on: Sparkling Red Star by Li Xintian
- Produced by: Liu Jun
- Starring: Zhu Xinyun; Gao Baocheng; Liu Jiang; Liu Jizhong
- Cinematography: Tso Chun-Wan; Cai Ji-Wei
- Music by: Fu Geng-Chen
- Production company: August First Film Studio
- Release date: 1974
- Running time: 104 minutes
- Country: China
- Language: Mandarin

Sparkling Red Star is a 1974 Chinese film and one of the very few films produced in China during the Cultural Revolution. Co-directed by Li Jun and Li Ang, the film is a mix between a war film, a children's film and a musical. Today, given the heavy-handed political message and state control of the Sparkling Red Star's story and production, it is generally considered a propaganda film. The film was remade in 2007 as an animated tale.

== Plot ==
The film tells the story of Pan Dongzi, a teenager and son of a Communist army officer. When the father is called off, he leaves Dongzi a red star as a symbol of the cause. While he is away, a bourgeois landlord, Hu Hansan, returns to Dongzi's village where he exacts revenge upon the peasants who had forced him out. In the process, Dongzi's mother is burned to death in their home.

Hardened by his mother's death, Dongzi joins a band of guerrilla fighters and eventually kills his former landlord. When his father finally returns, Dongzi joins him as the Red Army's newest recruit in the fight against the Japanese during Second Sino-Japanese War.

== Cast ==
- Zhu Xinyun
- Gao Baocheng
- Liu Jiang
- Liu Jizhong
