= Gnomes and Trolls: The Secret Chamber =

2008 Swedish animated film

- Theatrical release poster
- Directed by: Robert Rhodin
- Screenplay by: Salvatore Cardoni; Joel Cohen; Alec Sokolow
- Story by: Robert Rhodin
- Produced by: Carl Johan Merner; Robert Rhodin
- Music by: Anders Bagge; Oscar Merner
- Production company: White Shark
- Distributed by: AB Svensk Filmindustri
- Release dates: 31 January 2008 (Stockholm premiere); 27 March 2009 (Sweden)
- Running time: 75 minutes
- Country: Sweden
- Language: English
- Box office: $307,085

Gnomes and Trolls: The Secret Chamber is a 2008 Swedish animated children's fantasy film directed by Robert Rhodin for the Stockholm-based studio White Shark. The movie was the first CG animated movie produced by a Swedish company.

== Plot ==
Gnomes and Trolls, an action-adventure comedic fairy tale, marks White Shark's first foray into computer animation. Junior, a young gnome, wants nothing more than to invent gizmos and gadgets in his tree-house laboratory. But Junior's old school father, Jalle, the head gnome of the forest, would prefer his son follow in his footsteps and one day be in charge of his own forest. In spite of their differences, on the eve of the first winter storm Junior helps Jalle distribute food rations to the soon-to-be-hibernating animals. Then disaster strikes.

Perpetually bickering troll brothers Face and Slim execute their evil father Fassa's carefully plotted plan to steal the food from the gnome secret food chamber. After Jalle is accidentally injured, Junior and his best friend Sneaky, a paranoid neurotic crow, embark on a heroic journey to the depths of troll cave to retrieve the stolen food. Junior and Sneaky's adventure takes them across vast landscapes and into encounters with bizarre animals.

Along the way, Junior learns that it is possible to merge his passion for inventing with his newfound impetus to defend the forest. As Sneaky taps into an innate bravery he never knew he had, Slim is on path of discovery, and Junior's mother Svea reveals and goes beyond what it means to be a gnome wife.

== Cast ==
- Greg Berg as Sneaky
- Joe Cappelletti as Face
- Elizabeth Daily as Junior
- Kate Higgins as Alley
- Kym Lane as Fawn
- Lloyd Sherr as Jalle
- André Sogliuzzo as Fassa
- James Arnold Taylor as Slim

== Production ==
The screenwriting was overseen by the exec producers Alec Sokolow and Joel Cohen. The total budget for the film was $5m (USD). The production was fast with a production time of 12 months from writing the script to delivering the 35mm print.

== Film Festivals ==
=== 2008 ===
- Halifax, Nova Scotia, Canada (Tue 21 April 2009)
- Kristiansand, Norway (28 April 2009)
- 5th Dubai Film Festival 2008

=== 2009 ===
- Zin Fest in Czech Republic
- Buff filmfestival
- Cairo International film festival
- 11th Seol International Youth Film Festival 2009
- Jerusalem Cinematheque Children's film festival
- Nice film festival in Liverpool Nov/Dec 2009
- 10th China International Children's Film festival
- 4th International Bursa Silk Road Film Festival 2009

=== 2010 ===
- 6th Children's India Jan 2010
- Bermuda Film Festival March 2010
