= Robert Rhodin =

Robert Rhodin (born 15 May 1972 in Copenhagen, Denmark) is the CEO of Blockchain security company KEYCHAINX AG which is developing a keyless crypto wallet and have an American patent with the USPTO and Japan. The company is based in the canton of Zug, Switzerland.

== Career ==
Rhodin started programming during the PC boom in the late 1980s. At the age 16 he was hired to develop software tools for Swedish energy giant Vattenfall and their R&D department.

During 1992 the nuclear power station Forsmark experienced cracks in their cooling part of the reactor and Rhodin was hired to develop tools based on mathlab databases to track fluid flows through the reactors in order to determinate the source of the cracks.

By the beginning of 1993, he was running the first Animation studio and developing custom tools for 3D software.

During 1994 and 1995 Rhodin was teaching computer graphics as a certified trainer by Alias Wavefront in Toronto, Canada.

In early 1997 Rhodin worked for a short period of time for The Moving Picture company in London writing custom shaders and animation tools for CGI projects.

In 1998 he founded a post-production facility in Stockholm, Sweden.

2000 the Studio started to produce commercials and Television Spots.

During 2007, Rhodin founded an animation studio, White Shark in 2001 which went public on the Stockholm OMX Nasdaq stock exchange in 2009.

In 2008 Rhodin produced and directed the first CG-animated feature film in Sweden. Rhodin's first film-directing credit was Gnomes and Trolls: The Secret Chamber which screened May 2008 in Cannes, France. The picture was sold to over 80 countries entering the top ten at the box office in Sweden, Kuwait, the (UAE) and Turkey.

In 2014 Rhodin founded a production producing special effects and commercials for television clients.

== Director and producer credits ==
- Soul in the Piano - Feature Doc (2022)
- Baby Pirates - TV series (2016-)
- Forkladet Commercial (2015)
- Tomasz Ossolinski - Before the Show - Feature doc (2014)
- Evita Commercial (2014)
- Jesus Christ Superstar - TV commercial (2013)
- Priscilla "Queen of the Desert" - TV commercial (2013)
- Skrotarna - TV Series (2013)
- Gnomes & Trolls - The Secret Chamber, feature (2008)
- Burger King - Commercials (2000–2004)
- McDonald's - Korsordet - Commercial (2003)
- Parlamentet - TV Ident (2002)
- Vichy Novaeu - Commercial (1999)
- Land Rover - Commercial (1997)
- World Championship Athletic - Opening credits (1995)

== Writing Credits ==
- Troll Hunters (2018)
- Astrid Silverlock (2020)
- Gnomes and Trolls: The Secret Chamber(2008)

== Commercials FX ==
- Volkswagen Golf GTi - Production Co: mod:film
- Diesel - Perfume - Production Co: mod:film
- Candelia - Polly - Production Co: Petterson & Åkerlund
- Posten - OSA - Production Co: Petterson & Åkerlund
- McDonald's - Ronald McDonald Barncancerfond - Production Co: White Shark
- Sirius Satellite - Production Co: Stink London
- Superbrugsen
- Always

== Special Effects ==
- Gnomes and Trolls: The Secret Chamber (2008)
- Lilla Jönssonligan på Kollo (2004)
- Adam & Eva (2003)
- Hamilton (1998)
- The Borrowers (1997)
