= Li Xintian (writer) =

Chinese novelist (1929–2019)

- 李心田
- Born: January 1929; Suining County, Jiangsu, China
- Died: July 3, 2019 (aged 90); Jinan, Shandong, China
- Education: East China Military and Political University
- Occupation: Novelist
- Writing career
- Language: Chinese
- Period: 1953–2019
- Genre: Novel
- Notable works: The Sparkling Red Star; Two Little Fighters

Li Xintian (Chinese: 李心田; pinyin: Lǐ Xīntián; January 1929 – 3 July 2019) was a Chinese novelist best known for his novels The Sparkling Red Star and Two Little Fighters.

== Biography ==
Li was born in Suining County, Jiangsu Province, in January 1929. He started to publish works in 1953. His first stage play, Little Eagle, was published in 1961. That same year, his novellas Two Little Fighters was published. This was made into a phenomenally successful film in 1978. After graduating from East China Military and Political University, he joined the People's Liberation Army, becoming a civilian cadre in Jinan Military Region. His most influential work The Sparkling Red Star was published in 1970, and was adapted into a successful film. In 1979 he joined the China Writers Association. He died in Jinan, capital of east China's Shandong province, on July 3, 2019.

== Works ==
=== Novel ===
- Dreaming for 3000 years
- Thirty Years of Marriage
- Bridge in Dream
- A Pulsating Flame
- Ten Self-portraits

=== Novellas ===
- Two Little Fighters
- The Sparkling Red Star
- Blue Star on the Roof

=== Screenplay ===
- Sparkling Red Star (1974)
