= Puzzle Animation Studio =

Chinese animation studio

Puzzle Animation Studio Limited (simplified Chinese: 深圳市方块动漫画文化发展有限公司; traditional Chinese: 深圳市方塊動漫畫文化發展有限公司) is a Shenzhen-based animation studio, established in 2005. The studio engaged in the creation and production of 2D and 3D animated films and TV series featuring Chinese themes and characteristics.

== Filmography ==
- Master Q: Incredible Pet Detective (2003)
- Old Master Q – Fantasy Zone Battle (2005)
- Old Master Q – Fantasy Zone Battle II (2006)
- Old Master Series 3 (2006)
- Master Q Color Comics (2006)
- Gu Yu Xin Shuo (2006)
- Hong Kong Mother (2006)
- The Diary of Xiao Dong Zi (2007)
- Paula & Friends (2007)
- Sparkling Red Star (2007)
- Storm Rider Clash of the Evils (2008)
- Ji Ling Xiao Zhi Zhe / Zen Shuo (200?)
- AI Football GGO (2010)
- Ori-Princess (2011)

== See also ==
- History of Chinese animation
- Chinese animation
