= Chen Wencong =

Asian actor

Chen Wencong (1970 in Singapore – 5 December 2012) was an Asian actor and was in contact with Mark Lee, Ann Kok, Lee Teng and Zheng Geping. Wencong once won the Best Variety Producer in 2011.

== Personal life and death ==
Wencong was a Liverpool F.C. fan and died from leukaemia which he was diagnosed with in 2011.
