= Wind and Cloud 2 =

2005 Chinese–Taiwanese TV series

- DVD cover art
- 風雲2
- Genre: Wuxia
- Based on: Fung Wan by Ma Wing-shing
- Screenplay by: Bo Hua; Chen Huiyan
- Directed by: Lee Wai-man; Billy Tang; Liu Zifu
- Creative director: Young Pei-pei
- Presented by: Long Qiuyun; Peng Yi
- Starring: Vincent Zhao; Peter Ho; Huang Yi; Qin Lan
- Opening theme: "Wind and Cloud Laugh Proudly" (笑傲風雲) by Sun Xing
- Ending theme: "Other People's Forever and Ever" (別人的天長地久) by Fish Leong
- Countries of origin: China; Taiwan
- Original language: Mandarin
- No. of episodes: 42

Production
- Executive producers: Wei Wenbin; Tang Daxiang; Zhang Huijian
- Producers: Wu Yi; Ouyang Changlin; Yang Jinyuan; Tian Wei; Lin Xuqiao
- Production location: China
- Cinematography: Guo Zhiren; Xu Zhexian
- Editors: Chen Guilun; Xi Jiewei
- Running time: ≈45 minutes per episode
- Production companies: Hunan TV & Broadcast Intermediary; Young Pei-pei's Workshop

Original release
- Network: Tianjin TV
- Release: 15 January 2005

Related
- Wind and Cloud (2002)

Wind and Cloud 2 (風雲2) is a Chinese–Taiwanese wuxia television series adapted from the Hong Kong manhua series Fung Wan by Ma Wing-shing, and first aired on Tianjin TV in mainland China on 15 January 2005. Even though Wind and Cloud 2 is marketed as a sequel to Wind and Cloud (2002), it was produced by a different team and starred a completely new cast except the lead actors Vincent Zhao and Peter Ho, who reprised their roles as the titular protagonists.

== Synopsis ==
The series is based on the "Heaven's Gate" story arc of the manhua series. A mysterious stranger wearing an ice mask approaches Nie Feng and tells him he has the ability to resurrect the dead. To everyone's surprise, the stranger revives Di-er Meng, Nie Feng's lover who had died earlier. Nie Feng and Bu Jingyun gradually realise that they are falling under the stranger's control and being manipulated by him. The stranger, who claims to be a god and possesses supernatural powers, reveals himself to be Dishitian, the leader of a mysterious martial arts clan called Heaven's Gate. Several well-known martial artists in the wulin have joined Heaven's Gate either out of fear of Dishitian or temptation by the rewards he offers.

Dishitian's intentions become clear later. He is planning to recruit the fighters – including Nie Feng and Bu Jingyun – who wield the seven most powerful weapons in the wulin to join him in his quest to slay a dragon and obtain a magical orb which can boost his neigong by several times after consumption. The mission is successful but the orb shatters and the pieces end up in different locations. In greed, Dishitian consumes more pieces than his body can take, and ends up in a zouhuorumo state. His treacherous servant, Duan Lang, seizes the opportunity to kill him and absorb his neigong. Duan Lang then morphs into the Qilin Demon and becomes a dangerous threat to the wulin. Nie Feng and Bu Jingyun join forces to defeat Duan Lang.

== Cast ==
- Vincent Zhao as Nie Feng
- Peter Ho as Bu Jingyun
- Huang Yi as Di-er Meng
- Qin Lan as Yu Chuchu
- Feng Shaofeng as Huaikong
- Tammy Chen as Zining
- Chen Kuan-lin as Duan Lang
- Li Liqun as Xu Fu
- Wei Yicheng as Dishitian
- Sun Xing as Xiongba
- Liu Weihua as Wuming
- Zheng Guolin as Huaimie
- Li Xingyu as Luo Xian
- Huang Jianuo as Jianchen
- Yue Yueli as Tie Kuangtu
- Yang Rui as Bai Ling
- Pan Hong as Xiaosanxiao
- Zhu Hong as Du Yunling
- Wang Xianghong as Tie Shinan
- Wang Zhimin as Huangying
- Gesang Duojie as Pojun
- Zhang Zhilü as Long'er
- Wang Jialin as Juexin
- Jin Shugui as Yiyou
- Zhu Yifan as Bu Tian
- Li Jiafan as Wu'er
- Yao Jian as Xiaoyao
- Zong Xiaojun as Xiling Xiaofo
- Han Zhenhua as Shenyi
- Ji Qilin as Qin Shi Huang
- Li Juanmi as Shiqin Buren
- Dai Zhao'an as Ao Mou
- Liu Jianrong as Beiye Xiongshi
- Chen Yong as Nanluan Zhuge
