= Wind and Cloud =

2002 Chinese–Taiwanese TV series

- DVD cover art
- Also known as: Fung Wan; The Storm Riders
- 風雲
- Genre: Wuxia
- Based on: Fung Wan by Ma Wing-shing
- Screenplay by: Ma Wing-shing; Wen Lifang
- Directed by: Hsu Chin-liang; Shen Yi; Yu Weide; Ma Yanliang; Li Li'an; Zheng Jianrong
- Presented by: Zhu Yongde; Li Bolun; Hsu Chin-liang; Teng Zhan
- Starring: Vincent Zhao; Peter Ho; Sonny Chiba
- Opening theme: "Wind and Cloud" (風雲) by Jiang Desheng
- Ending theme: "Forever and Ever" (永遠永遠) by Lee E-jun
- Countries of origin: China; Taiwan
- Original language: Mandarin
- No. of episodes: 44

Production
- Executive producers: Zhuo Wu; Huang Jianxin; Zhang Zhan
- Producers: Hsu Chin-liang; Yang Fan; Zhu Cheng
- Production location: Leshan
- Cinematography: Hua Panming; Zhao Honghai; Guan Jianzhuang
- Editors: Cai Zhisheng; Chen Guilun; Zhou Xiangliang; Zhu Shumei; Zhong Shuicai
- Running time: ≈45 minutes per episode
- Production companies: CTV; Shanghai Film Group Corporation; Century Hero Media Group; Sichuan Haotian Film and Television Advertising; Taiwan Bomo Xianren Enterprise; Beijing Jinyingma Film and Television Culture

Original release
- Release: 8 June 2002

Related
- Wind and Cloud 2 (2005)

Wind and Cloud (風雲), also known as Fung Wan and The Storm Riders, is a Chinese–Taiwanese wuxia television series adapted from the Hong Kong manhua series Fung Wan by Ma Wing-shing. Starring Vincent Zhao and Peter Ho as the titular protagonists, the series was first broadcast in mainland China on 8 June 2002. It was followed by a 2005 sequel, Wind and Cloud 2, which was produced by a different team and starred a completely new cast (except Zhao and Ho, who reprised their roles).

== Synopsis ==
The series follows the first two story arcs in the manhua series. Xiongba, the chief of the martial arts clan Tianxiahui, learns from the prophet Nipusa that he will rise to prominence in the wulin with the help of Wind and Cloud. By chance, he meets two boys – Nie Feng (Wind) and Bu Jingyun (Cloud) – and takes them as his apprentices.

When Nie Feng and Bu Jingyun are grown up, Nipusa reveals to Xiongba that his downfall will also be due to Wind and Cloud. To prevent the prophecy from becoming reality, Xiongba plots to turn Nie Feng and Bu Jingyun against each other, but his plan fails. Nie Feng and Bu Jingyun embark on their own journeys to mastering more powerful skills and becoming top-tier fighters in the wulin, while at the same time meeting their respective romantic partners.

At one point, Xiongba is betrayed by his followers, loses his powers, and finds himself at Bu Jingyun's mercy. He promises to repent and retire permanently from the wulin, so Bu Jingyun spares him. In the meantime, a Japanese warrior Juewushen leads his clan to China in a bid to dominate the wulin and rule China. Nie Feng and Bu Jingyun join forces to stop and defeat Juewushen.

Towards the end, it is revealed that Xiongba has been secretly plotting to stage a comeback and realise his ambition of controlling the wulin. Nie Feng and Bu Jingyun combine forces to defeat their treacherous former master and fulfil the prophecy.

== Cast ==
- Vincent Zhao as Nie Feng
  - Yin Yifan as Nie Feng (child)
- Peter Ho as Bu Jingyun
  - Zhang Xibei as Bu Jingyun (child)
- Sonny Chiba as Xiongba
- Wong Hei as Qin Shuang
  - Duan Kai as Qin Shuang (child)
- Tao Hong as Yu Chuchu
- Annie Wu as Kong Ci / Ding Ning
- Jiang Qinqin as Di-er Meng / Mingyue
- Sun Xing as Wuming
- Xing Minshan as Jianchen
- Zuo Baixue as Pojun
- Chiang Tsu-ping as Youruo
- Wang Jialin as Duan Lang
  - Gu Jin as Duan Lang (child)
- Yang Li as Dugu Yifang
- Chen Boyu as Dugu Meng
- Lily Tien as Yan Ying
- Ku Kuan-chung as Nie Renwang
- Mo Meilin as Nie Ying
- He Dulin as Wen Chouchou
- Bo Xueliang as Nipusa
- Wang Huiwu as Juewushen
- Su Jiacheng as Juexin
- Li Chen as Juetian
- Choi Hing-lun as Ao Tian
- Jin Ping as Lady Ao
- Liu Xi as Jiansheng
- Huang Ruomeng as Buxu
- Xu Weiping as Yu Yue
- Zhang Zhiwei as Xue Antian
- Cheng Sihan as Disan Zhuhuang
- Zhong Minghe as Di-er Daohuang
- Liu Jinquan as Diyi Xiehuang
- Zhang Xin as Zhizun
- Zhu Tong as Eunuch Cao
- China Dolls as Wawa Shashou
- Zhang Wei as Wen Nu
- Jia Shitou as Shiweixian
- Wang Yu as Zhitanhua
- Mao Tingqi as Xibao
- Zhou Jing as Laolao
- Ge Sang as Dugu Ming
- Wang Cheng as Jianpin
- Wang Xihui as Bushen
- Zhang Hengping as Lü Yi
- Tian Zhongmei as Rong Po
- Shen Baoping as Huo Butian / Huo Lie
- Li Yuze as Huo Jiqian
