= Storm Rider Clash of the Evils =

2008 Hong Kong animated film by Dante Lam

- Film poster
- 風雲決
- Directed by: Dante Lam
- Screenplay by: Tommy Tse Kai-Cheung
- Based on: Fung Wan by Ma Wing-shing
- Produced by: Chan Leung; Yeung Man-hung; Chan Mun; Chin Kwok-tung; Tse Kei-cheung
- Starring: Richie Ren; Nicholas Tse
- Music by: Henry Lai
- Production companies: Puzzle Animation Studio; Shanghai Media Group
- Distributed by: Asia Animation
- Release date: 25 September 2008 (Hong Kong)
- Running time: 98 minutes
- Country: Hong Kong
- Languages: Mandarin; Cantonese
- Box office: CN¥21.75 million

Storm Rider Clash of the Evils (風雲決) is a 2008 Hong Kong animated wuxia film directed by Dante Lam and produced by Puzzle Animation Studio and Shanghai Media Group. Starring Richie Ren and Nicholas Tse, it is adapted from the manhua series Fung Wan by Ma Wing-shing.

== Synopsis ==
The film is a spinoff of the original story and the two protagonists Wind and Cloud. The residents of Sword-Worshipping Manor, which houses the best swordsmiths in the world, are brutally massacred after they are alleged to be plotting a rebellion against the government. The young master of the manor, Ao Jue, is the only survivor. Ao Jue vows to finish forging the Invincible Sword, a task passed down by generations of his family which has yet to be completed. Ao Jue attacks Under Heaven Society and battles with Wind and Cloud to obtain the blood of the Fire Kirin which can unleash the power of the sword. As the blood of the Fire Kirin runs in Wind's veins, he becomes Ao Jue's primary target.

== Cast ==
Role	Mandarin voice	Cantonese voice
Wind	Richie Ren	Hins Cheung
Cloud	Nicholas Tse	Raymond Lam
Ao Jue	Tong Zirong	Juno Mak
Nameless	Gui Nan	Ti Lung
Violet	Zhan Jia	Regen Cheung
Second Dream	Han Xue	Crystal Cheung
Breaking Wave	Song Huaiqiang	Chin Kwok-tung
Constable Shuai	Wu Lei	Vincent Wong
Broken Lady	Fan Churong	Winkie Lai
Ice Shadow	Jiang Xiaohan	Chrissie Chau
Lord Conqueror	Cheng Yuzhu	
Ghost Physician	Wu Wenlun	
Mud Bodhisattva	Liu Feng	

== Production ==
The first trailer for the film was released in 2006. It showed a battle between Cloud and Wind in a forest. They eventually show their true powers and escalate the fight to greater heights. They are then shown clashing on top of the Great Wall of China. Characters that are so far confirmed to be in this movie are Cloud, Wind, Breaking Wave, the Fire Kirin, Lord Conqueror, Nameless, Second Dream, Frost, Charity and Ao Jue.

The film was supposed to be released in the winter of 2006 but its release was delayed to July 2008.

== Reception ==
The film grossed CN¥21.75 million in China.
