= Centro Digital Pictures =

Special effects and animation company

- The Centro Digital Pictures first logo, used from 1985 to 2012
- Company type: Privately held company
- Industry: Visual effects CGI animation Post-production; Game design
- Predecessor: Centro TV Studio
- Founded: 1985
- Founder: John Chu
- Defunct: 2015
- Headquarters: Hong Kong, China
- Key people: John Chu
- Number of employees: 150

Centro Digital Pictures Limited was a visual special effects and animation company based in Hong Kong that provided visual effects for film, interactive media, and video games.

== History ==
Centro Digital Pictures was founded by John Chu in 1985. Centro (先濤) began as a post-production house for Hong Kong commercials in the mid-1980s. In 1998, Centro co-produced Andrew Lau's The Storm Riders. Centro also co-produced Lau's A Man Called Hero (1999), based on Ma Wing-shing's manhua series Chinese Hero: Tales of the Blood Sword.

In 2001, Chu received the Bronze Bauhinia Star for "raising Hong Kong's profile in the use of advanced technology in entertainment productions." Centro provided visual effects for Kill Bill, for which they received a BAFTA nomination.

Centro's next visual effects project was for Stephen Chow's Kung Fu Hustle (2004). The company had over 60 CG artists on the production, working in 2K resolution to complete the effects work within eight months. At the 42nd Golden Horse Awards, Centro's effects team (represented by Frankie Chung, Don Ma, Tam Kai-kwan, and Franco Hung) won for Best Visual Effects.

In 2005, Buena Vista International (BVI) announced their plans to work with Centro and China Film Group Corporation on an adaptation of the children's story "The Secret of the Magic Gourd" by Zhang Tianyi. This project, The Secret of the Magic Gourd (2007), was the first Chinese film production of BVI's parent organisation, The Walt Disney Company.

The company also performed contract work for Ubisoft on the video game titles 187 Ride or Die and Tom Clancy's Splinter Cell.

In 2012, Centro became a wholly owned subsidiary of the Deluxe Entertainment Services Group. In 2015, the company went offline, and it closed in 2018.

== Special effects filmography ==
- The Umbrella Story (directed by Clifton Ko, 1995)
- First Strike (directed by Stanley Tong, 1996)
- Thanks for Your Love (directed by Norman Law and Daniel Yu, 1996)
- Lost and Found (directed by Lee Chi-ngai, 1996)
- The Emperor's Shadow (Qin song, directed by Zhou Xiaowen, 1996)
- Who Is Running? (directed by Oxide Pang Chun, 1997)
- The Mad Phoenix (directed by Clifton Ko, 1997)
- The Soong Sisters (directed by Mabel Cheung, 1997)
- The Storm Riders (directed by Andrew Lau 1998)
- The Emperor and the Assassin (directed by Chen Kaige, 1998)
- City of Glass (directed by Mabel Cheung, 1998)
- Hot War (directed by Jingle Ma, 1998)
- A Man Called Hero (directed by Andrew Lau, 1999)
- Bangkok Dangerous (directed by the Pang brothers, 1999)
- Shaolin Soccer (directed by Stephen Chow, 2001)
- Chinese Odyssey 2002 (directed by Jeffrey Lau, 2002)
- The Eye (directed by the Pang brothers, 2002)
- Kill Bill: Volume 1 (directed by Quentin Tarantino, 2003)
- Kill Bill: Volume 2 (directed by Quentin Tarantino, 2004)
- Kung Fu Hustle (directed by Stephen Chow, 2004)
- The Promise (directed by Chen Kaige, 2005)
- Curse of the Golden Flower (directed by Zhang Yimou, 2006)
- The Secret of the Magic Gourd (directed by Frankie Chung [鍾志行] and John Chu, 2007)
- Run Papa Run (directed by Sylvia Chang, 2008)
- GeGeGe no Kitaro 2: Sennen Noroi Uta (directed by Katsuhide Motoki, 2008)
- City of Life and Death (directed by Lu Chuan, 2009)
- Kungfu Cyborg (directed by Jeffrey Lau, 2009)

== Awards ==
=== Wins ===
In 2002, Centro won a Golden Horse Award for Best Visual Effects for The Eye. They also won a Hong Kong Film Award, a Golden Horse Film Award, and a Satellite Award for their work on Kung Fu Hustle.

=== Nominations ===
Centro was nominated for Hong Kong Film Awards for Best Sound Design for A Man Called Hero, a BAFTA Award for Best Special Visual Effects for their work on Kill Bill: Volume 1 and 2, and a Hong Kong Film Award for Best Visual Effects for Curse of the Golden Flower.
