= Blood Sword =

Blood Sword may refer to:

- Blood Sword (gamebook series)
- Chinese Hero: Tales of the Blood Sword, a wuxia manhua series created by Hong Kong artist Ma Wing-shing
  - The Blood Sword, a Hong Kong television series based on the manhua
  - The Blood Sword 2, a Hong Kong television series based on the manhua
- Songs of Blood and Sword, a memoir by Fatima Bhutto
