= The Secret of the Magic Gourd =

The Secret of the Magic Gourd may refer to:

- The Secret of the Magic Gourd (novel), novel by Chinese author Zhang Tianyi
- The Secret of the Magic Gourd (1963 film), 1963 Chinese film adapted from the novel
- The Secret of the Magic Gourd (2007 film), 2007 live-action movie made by Centro in co-operation with China Movie Co Ltd and Disney
