= Shenwuji =

- Cover of Shenwuji 3, art by Ma Wing Shing

神武紀
- Genre: Action/adventure, science fiction
- Author: Ma Wing Shing
- Publisher: Jonesky (Hong Kong)
- Volumes: 40 issues

Shenwuji (Chinese: 神武紀) is a spin-off manhua based on Fung Wan also by Ma Wing Shing. It ran for 40 issues.

== History ==
Shenwuji was first made known when a mini-comic was included with Fung Wan issue #400. It depicted a team of diggers discovering the Ultimate Superior Sword in the year 2047.

== Basic plot ==
=== Part I ===
Bou Keng Wan and Nip Fung are reincarnated in the future in year 2047 anno dominni as well as Hung Ba. Bou Keng Wan (now named Aor Teek(Metal)) and Nip Fung (who retains his ancestor's name) come into direct contact with Hung Ba's reincarnate. Aor Teek possess a strange art of Kung Fu that the antagonists want. On later issues, Aor Teek and Nip Fung are slowly pushed out of the storyline and it begins to focus on cyborgs and clones.

=== Part II ===
Introduces several important historical characters from the era of the Three Kingdoms, such as the tyrant Cao Cao (Bou Keng Wan's equivalent), the strategist Zhuge Liang (presumably Nip Fung's carnation), and the mighty Lu Bu. By this point of the story, the future reincarnations Aor Teek and Nip Fung are no longer relevant to the story, and were written out before the first issue of this second story arc.

=== Part III ===
Deals with a time skip hundreds of years into the future, where cyborgs and clones are the main attractions of the story.

== Criticism ==
Ma Wing Shing was touting the series as "Wind and Cloud of the Future" and while they do appear so, it was not what the fans were expecting. They were even excluded from the final issue. Ma even admitted at one point that he was disappointed with how the story was going. Fans have criticized that the plot became too convoluted towards the end, and therefore stopped reading. There has also been criticisms of uninteresting enemies and wasted potential. These may have all led to the series being finished after only 40 issues, while its brother comic Fung Wan is currently on its 493rd issue.

== See also ==
- Fung Wan
