= The Blood Sword =

1990 Hong Kong TV series

- VCD cover art
- 中華英雄
- Genre: Wuxia
- Based on: Chinese Hero: Tales of the Blood Sword by Ma Wing-shing
- Screenplay by: Lo Wing-kwong
- Directed by: Yuen Yan-hong; Wong Wai-yan; Wong Kum-tin
- Starring: Kenny Ho; Veronica Yip; Yeung Chak-lam; Esther Kwan; Lau Wun-fung; Kwan Chan-nei; Eric Wan; Chan Tung-mui; Law Chung-wah
- Theme music composer: Tam Tong-lei
- Opening theme: "Chinese Hero" (中華英雄) by Kenny Ho
- Ending theme: "Chinese Hero" (中華英雄) by Kenny Ho
- Composer: Wong Bong-yin
- Country of origin: Hong Kong
- Original language: Cantonese
- No. of episodes: 25

Production
- Producer: Chiu Chun-keung
- Production location: Hong Kong
- Cinematography: Wong Ka-kuen; Lok Cheung-mun; Tai Kwok-chai
- Editor: Tam Kit-leung
- Running time: ≈40 minutes per episode
- Production company: ATV

Original release
- Network: ATV
- Release: 11 June 1990 – 1990

Related
- The Blood Sword 2 (1991)

The Blood Sword
- Traditional Chinese: 中華英雄
- Simplified Chinese: 中华英雄
- Literal meaning: Chinese Hero
Transcriptions
Standard Mandarin
- Hanyu Pinyin: Zhōnghuá Yīngxíong
Yue: Cantonese
- Jyutping: Zung1 Waa4 Jing1 Hung4

The Blood Sword (中華英雄) is a Hong Kong wuxia television series adapted from the manhua series Chinese Hero: Tales of the Blood Sword by Ma Wing-shing. The series was produced by ATV and first aired in June 1990. It was followed by a 1991 prequel, The Blood Sword 2.

== Synopsis ==
The series is set in the jianghu of early 20th-century China. A grey-haired Hua Yingxiong travels alone to an island to settle an old feud between the Hua and Chi families. He has been separated from his family for over 20 years after they were ambushed by enemies while sailing back to China from America. Hua Yingxiong's wife, Jieyu, was killed by the attackers; their daughter, Hua Wenying, was thrown overboard and presumed dead; their son, Hua Jianxiong, was raised by their servant Shengnu.

Hua Jianxiong becomes bitter enemies with Situ Mowen after the latter killed Shengnu. He also encounters Taxue by chance, falls in love with her, and marries her. However, they incur the jealousy of Si-ao, the daughter of the Hua family's servant Guipu, because she has a crush on Hua Jianxiong. In the meantime, Hua Yingxiong resolves the feud and becomes an ally of Chi Lianyingwang, the Chi family patriarch. He also accepts Chi Lianyingwang's son, Chi Yan, as his apprentice. He also develops a crush on Ziyi, one of the Chi family's mercenaries, because she resembles Jieyu in appearance.

Hua Wenying had actually survived and was renamed Qiongtian. She was raised by Yuanlaowang of the Hell Clan and groomed to become the clan leader. She developed a cruel and treacherous personality under Yuanlaowang's influence and eventually murdered her foster father to secure her position in the Hell Clan. She pretends to love Situ Mowen and manipulates him to help her. With support from Situ Mowen and the Japanese Iga School's ninjas, Qiongtian leads the Hell Clan to attack other martial arts clans and dominate the jianghu. She also incites conflict between Situ Wuliang (supposedly Situ Mowen's father) and the Iga School, after discovering that Situ Mowen is actually the son of the Iga School's leader.

The Huas combine forces with the Chi family and other clans to resist the Hell Clan and its allies. Hua Yingxiong restores peace in the jianghu after defeating and reluctantly killing his evil daughter.

== Cast ==
- Kenny Ho as Hua Yingxiong, the protagonist. The titular Blood Sword refers to his weapon, a red-bladed sword.
- Law Chung-wah as Hua Jianxiong, Hua Yingxiong and Jieyu's son.
- Veronica Yip as Ziyi, a mercenary hired by the Chi family. She is similar in appearance to Jieyu, Hua Yingxiong's deceased wife.
- Yeung Chak-lam as Chi Lianyingwang, the patriarch of the Chi family.
- Esther Kwan as Qiongtian / Hua Wenying, Hua Yingxiong and Jieyu's lost-long daughter who becomes the evil leader of the Hell Clan.
- Eric Wan as Situ Mowen, an evil martial artist who becomes Hua Jianxiong's bitter rival.
- Kwan Chan-nei as Si-ao, Guipu's daughter who has a crush on Hua Jianxiong.
- Chan Tung-mui as Taxue, Hua Jianxiong's wife.
- Lau Wun-fung as Situ Wuliang, Situ Mowen's father and a formidable antagonist. He turns out to be not Situ Mowen's real father.
- Mok Ka-yiu as Chi Yan, Chi Lianyingwang's son and Hua Yingxiong's apprentice.
- Hung Chi-shing as Guipu, the Hua family's servant.
- Jackie Lui as Yu Buwei, Hua Jianxiong's friend.
- Chan Chek-wai as Shengnu, the Hua family's servant who raised Hua Jianxiong.

== See also ==
- Chinese Hero: Tales of the Blood Sword
- A Man Called Hero
- The Blood Sword 2
- The Legend of Hero
