= The Legend of Hero =

2005 Taiwanese TV series

- VCD cover art
- 中華英雄
- Genre: Wuxia
- Based on: Chinese Hero: Tales of the Blood Sword by Ma Wing-shing
- Screenplay by: Bo Hua; Ruan Shaona; Lo Wing-kwong; Ding Fang; Hong Xi; Zhang Ding
- Directed by: Billy Tang; Liu Zifu; Ching Siu-tung (action director)
- Starring: Peter Ho; Ady An; Lan Cheng-lung; Qin Lan; Zheng Guolin; Chen Guanlin; Liu Weihua; Li Liqun; Feng Shaofeng
- Composer: Wang Bang
- Country of origin: Taiwan
- Original language: Mandarin
- No. of episodes: 42

Production
- Producer: Young Pei-pei
- Production location: China
- Editors: Chen Guilun; Cui Dehua
- Running time: ≈45 minutes per episode

Original release
- Network: Youku; Tencent; Bilibili
- Release: 12 August 2005

The Legend of Hero
- Traditional Chinese: 中華英雄
- Simplified Chinese: 中华英雄
- Literal meaning: Chinese Hero
Transcriptions
Standard Mandarin
- Hanyu Pinyin: Zhōnghuá Yīngxíong
- Wade–Giles: Chung1-hua2 Ying1-hsiung2

The Legend of Hero (中華英雄) is a 2005 Taiwanese wuxia television series adapted from the Hong Kong manhua series Chinese Hero: Tales of the Blood Sword by Ma Wing-shing. Produced by Young Pei-pei and directed by Billy Tang, the series starred cast members from Taiwan and mainland China.

== Synopsis ==
Hua Yingxiong is forced to flee from China after killing the foreigners who murdered his parents, leaving behind his romantic partner, Chen Jieyu. After escaping, he mistakenly boards a ship for Chinese labourers and ends up in America. There, he runs into trouble after standing up to the overbearing supervisors, but is saved by Jin Ao, a formidable swordsman, who takes him as an apprentice and trains him in martial arts.

Hua Yingxiong gets into conflict with Jin Taibao, the ambitious son of Chinese immigrants, while trying to unite the local Chinese community to counter racial discrimination. He also starts a romantic relationship with Mu Xiuluo, Jin Taibao's first love, after saving her life. When Chen Jieyu shows up in America and reunites with Hua Yingxiong, a love rivalry develops between her and Mu Xiuluo over Hua, especially after Jin Taibao instigates Mu to attack Chen. At one point, Hua Yingxiong makes peace with Jin Taibao and forms a friendship with Jin's father, Jin Longtou. However, Jin Taibao already holds a deep-seated grudge against Hua Yingxiong, so he conspires with the Japanese to harm Hua.

Hua Yingxiong and Chen Jieyu eventually marry and have a daughter, but tragedy befalls them soon. After Jin Taibao causes the deaths of Chen Jieyu and her newborn girl, Hua Yingxiong is so devastated that he sinks into depression. However, he eventually recovers and returns to confront Jin Taibao and protect the Chinese community.

== Cast ==
- Peter Ho as Hua Yingxiong
- Ady An as Chen Jieyu
- Lan Cheng-lung as Muxi
- Qin Lan as Mu Xiuluo
- Zheng Guolin as Guipu
- Chen Guanlin as Jin Taibao
- Liu Weihua as Jin Longtou
- Li Liqun as Jin Ao
- Feng Shaofeng as Li Qianjun
- Alex Fong as Wudi
- Li Tian-chu as Yaobanxian
- Ku Pao-ming as Zuidian
- Derek Chen as Hua Jianxiong
- Ma Yashu as Jisi
- Queenie Tai as Anna
- Jin Shugui as Jingshang
- Liu Hengyu as Kuangshi'er
- Cao Qiugen as Shengnu
- Wang Jianxin as Luohan
- Nie Yaliang as Zhou Yesheng
- Liu Zhigang as Li Wuqiong
- Zhang Ruijia as Tengzi
- Wei Lai as Wuqing
- Wang Bin as Qian Wuyi

== See also ==
- Chinese Hero: Tales of the Blood Sword
- A Man Called Hero
- The Blood Sword
- The Blood Sword 2
