= A Man Called Hero =

1999 Hong Kong film by Andrew Lau

- DVD cover art
- 中華英雄
- Directed by: Andrew Lau
- Screenplay by: Manfred Wong
- Based on: Chinese Hero: Tales of the Blood Sword by Ma Wing-shing
- Produced by: Manfred Wong; Barbie Tung
- Starring: Ekin Cheng; Shu Qi; Kristy Yang; Nicholas Tse
- Cinematography: Andrew Lau
- Edited by: Danny Pang
- Music by: Chan Kwong-wing
- Production companies: Golden Harvest; Centro Digital Pictures; BoB and Partners
- Distributed by: Golden Harvest; Sahamongkol Film International
- Release date: 17 July 1999
- Running time: 116 minutes
- Country: Hong Kong
- Language: Cantonese
- Box office: HK$23,368,902

A Man Called Hero
- Traditional Chinese: 中華英雄
- Simplified Chinese: 中华英雄
- Literal meaning: Chinese Hero
Transcriptions
Standard Mandarin
- Hanyu Pinyin: Zhōnghuá Yīngxíong
Yue: Cantonese
- Jyutping: Zung1 Waa4 Jing1 Hung4

A Man Called Hero (中華英雄) is a 1999 Hong Kong wuxia film adapted from the manhua series Chinese Hero: Tales of the Blood Sword by Ma Wing-shing. Directed by Andrew Lau, it starred Ekin Cheng, Shu Qi, Kristy Yang, and Nicholas Tse. It won the 1999 Golden Horse Award for Best Visual Effects.

== Synopsis ==
The film is set in the early 20th century. Pride, a swordmaster, takes Hero as his second apprentice and trains him in swordsmanship. Shortly after, Hero kills the foreigners who murdered his parents, and spends the night with his lover Jade. The next morning, he flees China on board a ship bound for the United States.

Many years later, Hero's childhood friend Sheng and Hero's son Sword arrive in Chinatown, New York City, where they meet Luohan, who recounts how he met Hero on the ship and their experiences as labourers in Steel Bull Canyon. Later, Sword and Sheng visit Jade's grave, where Sheng tells Sword that he and Jade travelled to New York City 16 years ago to search for Hero, who reunited with Jade and married her. After that, they meet Kate, the daughter of Hero's senior Shadow, and she leads them to their father.

Shadow tells Sword and Sheng how he rescued Hero from Steel Bull Canyon after Hero was falsely accused of murdering two men. Hero and Shadow had encountered the Five Ninjas who serve their master's rival Invincible, and defeated them. During their fight, Hero had spared and saved Wood, one of the Ninjas who developed a crush on him. Another Ninja who was in love with Wood had felt jealous and set fire to China House shortly after Jade gave birth to a pair of twins. During the chaos, a traitor Bigot had kidnapped Sword's twin sister and disappeared. Jade had died in Hero's arms due to excessive blood loss during childbirth.

After Jade's death, Hero met a fortune teller, who tells him that he is destined to lead a lonely life as misfortune will befall those who are close to him. Hero had then entrusted Sword to Sheng's care before leaving with Shadow for Japan, where they witness a duel between Pride and Invincible. Although Pride defeated Invincible, he was fatally wounded and had passed his skills and neigong to Hero before his death.

In the present, Sword, Sheng, Luohan and the others devise a plan to liberate the labourers at Steel Bull Canyon. They infiltrate the canyon in disguise as a Chinese opera troupe and catch the supervisors off guard. Luohan dies in a suicide attack, while Sword corners Bigot and demands to know his sister's whereabouts. Bigot is about to shoot Sword when Hero shows up and finishes him off. Hero then uses his neigong to create an explosion to prevent the supervisors from advancing further, and everyone safely retreats.

Sword is excited to see his father in person for the first time, but his father remains cold and distant towards him. Hero also meets Wood, who still shows unrequited love towards him, and she warns him that Invincible has come to New York City to challenge Hero, Pride's successor. Hero and Invincible have a duel on top of the Statue of Liberty which ends with Hero's victory. After that, Sword and Sheng prepare to return to China while Hero watches them from afar and walks away in the opposite direction.

== Cast ==
- Ekin Cheng as Hero
- Shu Qi as Wood
- Kristy Yang as Jade
- Nicholas Tse as Sword
- Yuen Biao as the Boss of China House
- Jerry Lamb as Sheng
- Dion Lam as Shadow
  - Jordan Chan as Shadow (voice)
- Anthony Wong as Pride
- Ken Lo as Luohan
- Francis Ng as Invincible
- Elvis Tsui as Bigot
- Mark Cheng as the Gold Ninja
- Sam Lee as the Fire Ninja
- Grace Yip as Kate
- Jude Poyer as Bull
- Cheng Pei-pei as Hero's mother
- Wong Ban as the manager of China House
- Yu Ka-ho as the Earth Ninja
- Benjamin Yuen as the Water Ninja
- Thomas Hudak as the Black Dragon Commander

== Music ==
The music and songs for the film were composed by Chan Kwong-wing. The theme song "Star of Death" (天煞孤星;cantonese version) / "Edge of the World" (天涯海角;mandarin version) was sung by Ekin Cheng. There are also two insert songs – "The Flower is Good" (花正好) and "First Glance" (第一眼) – sung by Cheng and Nicholas Tse respectively.

== Awards and nominations ==
=== Awards ===
- 1999 Golden Horse Film Awards
  - Best Visual Effects - Centro Digital Pictures Limited

=== Nominations ===
- 1999 Golden Horse Film Awards
  - Best Film Editing - Danny Pang
  - Best Action Choreography - Dion Lam
- 19th Hong Kong Film Awards (2000)
  - Best Action Choreography - Dion Lam
  - Best Costume Make Up Design - Lee Pik-kwan
  - Best Original Film Score - Chan Kwong-wing
  - Best Original Film Song - Albert Leung, Chan Kwong-wing
  - Best Sound Design - Zeng Jingxiang

== See also ==
- The Blood Sword
- The Blood Sword 2
- The Legend of Hero
