= Boxer from Shantung =

1972 Hong Kong film by Chang Cheh and Pao Hsueh-li

The Boxer From Shantung
- Film poster

Chinese name
- Traditional Chinese: 馬永貞
- Simplified Chinese: 马永贞
Transcriptions
Standard Mandarin
- Hanyu Pinyin: Mǎ Yǒng Zhēn
Yue: Cantonese
- Jyutping: Maa2 Wing2 Zing1
- Directed by: Chang Cheh; Pao Hsueh-li
- Screenplay by: Chang Cheh; Ni Kuang
- Produced by: Runme Shaw
- Starring: Chen Kuan-tai; Ching Li; David Chiang
- Cinematography: Kung Mu-to; Yuen Teng-bong
- Edited by: Kwok Ting-hung
- Music by: Frankie Chan
- Production company: Shaw Brothers Studio
- Distributed by: Shaw Brothers Studio
- Release date: 11 February 1972
- Running time: 129 minutes
- Country: Hong Kong
- Language: Mandarin

The Boxer from Shantung is a 1972 Hong Kong kung fu film directed by Chang Cheh and Pao Hsueh-li, and starring Chen Kuan-tai, Ching Li and guest stars David Chiang. Godfrey Ho was assistant director (as Chih Chiang Ho).

== Plot ==
Boxer from Shantung follows Ma Yongzhen and Xiao Jiangbei. Ma and Xiao are manual laborers busting their tails in Shanghai at the beginning of the film, and Ma's first encounter with the crime lord Tan Si - who shares power in the city with Boss Yang, who has the Four Champions fighting for him - starts him off on the underworld influence ladder. Step by step, he earns the respect of everyone he meets, either with his strength of character or by beating them up. When he gets a really big break by defeating a Russian strongman, he indulges himself in a fancy cigarette holder, much like the one Tan Si uses. However, he is mindful of his humble beginnings, and of the fact that times are still tough for many in Shanghai. He shares his good fortune with his old fellow wage slaves, and when they assist him in his various extralegal activities, he lectures them on the futility of trying to extort money from people who simply don't have any to spare.

The tea house that Ma and his underlings frequent employs a singer, Jin Lingzi, and her uncle, who provides the music. Ms. Jin's hopes that Ma's arrival will mark a turn for the better for conditions in the crime-plagued city are dashed when she ascertains that he isn't different enough from the other bosses she's seen rise and fall. She begins contemplating leaving the city.

Tan Si is ambushed and killed by Boss Yang. Ma finds Tan Si's body and is subsequently invited by Boss Yang to discuss business in a restaurant. Ma's followers warn him that Ma might be ambushed during the meeting. Ma decides to go anyway. He calls his friend and cart driver Xiao Jiangbei, gives him 100 dollars to leave the city as he is worried about his friend, who is too friendly and naive for the gangster lifestyle. In the restaurant, Yang has all the waiters and customers thrown out and replaces them with his own men. Ma arrives, observes the situation and slowly starts the conversation with Yang. He quickly tells Yang that he only came to the meeting to kill Yang. Suddenly the men Yang had placed in the restaurant start attacking Ma and hurt him with an Axe, that gets stuck in his torso. Despite his injury Ma - with the help of his own men, who arrived to help their boss - fights all of Yang's men and incapacitates them -including the four champions. Ma then kills Yang. One of Yang's men, who has survived the fight, attacks Ma and kills him. Ma's killer is then finished off by Ma's men.

The film ends with Jin Lingzi, her uncle and Xiao Jiangbei leaving Shanghai on a train.

== Cast ==
- Chen Kuan-tai as Ma Yongzhen
- Ching Li as Jin Lingzi
- David Chiang as Boss Tan Si (guest star)
- Cheng Kang-yeh as Xiao Jiangbei
- Chiang Nan as Boss Yang
- Fung Ngai as Fang Ah-gen
- Ku Feng as Chang Chin-fa
- Tin Ching as Li Caishun
- Wong Ching as Lu Pu
- Mario Milano as Russian muscleman

== Production ==
Director Chang Cheh discovered actor Chen Kuan-tai at a martial arts competition in 1969. Cheh made Boxer from Shantung with his co-director Pao Huseh-li in thirty days, this was in a time when most Shaw Brothers productions were made in two or three months.

== Release ==
The Boxer From Shantung was released in Hong Kong on February 11, 1972. On its release in the United States in 1980, it was titled The Killer from Shantung. The American release was cut by over 30 minutes by its distributor World Northal. When the film was released in Germany in 1975 as Der Pirat von Shantung, it was cut to 80 minutes.

== See also ==
- Hero, a 1997 remake, starring Takeshi Kaneshiro as Ma Yongzhen
- Master Ma, a 1998 Hong Kong-Taiwanese television series about Ma Yongzhen, starring Kenny Ho
- Once Upon a Time in Shanghai, a 2014 loose remake, with time setting changed to 1930s, starring Philip Ng as Ma Yongzhen
