= The Storm Warriors =

2009 Hong Kong film by the Pang brothers

- Teaser poster
- 風雲II
- Directed by: Danny Pang; Oxide Pang
- Screenplay by: Danny Pang; Oxide Pang; Pang Pak-sing; Timax Wong
- Based on: Fung Wan by Ma Wing-shing
- Produced by: Danny Pang; Oxide Pang; Alvin Lam; Cheung Hong-tat
- Starring: Aaron Kwok; Ekin Cheng; Nicholas Tse; Charlene Choi; Simon Yam; Kenny Ho
- Cinematography: Decha Srimantra
- Edited by: Curran Pang
- Music by: Ronald Ng
- Production companies: Universe Entertainment; Sil-Metropole; Chengtian Entertainment
- Distributed by: Universe Films Distribution
- Release date: 10 December 2009
- Running time: 111 minutes
- Country: Hong Kong
- Language: Cantonese
- Box office: US$5,668,356

The Storm Warriors (風雲II) is a 2009 Hong Kong wuxia film produced and directed by the Pang brothers. It is the second live-action film adaptation of the manhua series Fung Wan by artist Ma Wing-shing, following the 1998 film The Storm Riders. The Storm Warriors is based on Fung Wan's Japanese Invasion story arc The Death Battle. Ekin Cheng and Aaron Kwok respectively reprise their roles as Wind and Cloud, who this time find themselves up against Lord Godless (Simon Yam), a ruthless Japanese warlord bent on invading China. The film is a co-production between Universe Entertainment and Sil-Metropole Organisation.

A sequel to The Storm Riders was first announced in March 2008 after Universe gained rights to the Fung Wan franchise from former film distributor Golden Harvest. The Pangs aimed on creating a big-budgeted film involving visual effects and stated that The Storm Warriors would not be a direct sequel to its 1998 predecessor. Principal photography for The Storm Warriors began in April 2008 and ended in July; filming took place in three studios located in Bangkok. The film is notable for being the first Chinese-language film shot in bluescreen. During post-production, effects artists worked on scenes involving computer-generated imagery, focusing on the film's setting and backgrounds.

The Storm Warriors was released theatrically in Hong Kong on 10 December 2009.

== Synopsis ==
Lord Godless, an evil Japanese warlord, aims to conquer China so he captures the Chinese emperor, poisons numerous masters in the wulin, and issues an ultimatum to join him or die. Nameless, a famous martial artist, breaks free and gives the antidote to the captured masters. Despite their combined efforts, Godless remains unaffected by their attacks and kills them.

Nameless, Cloud, Wind, and Chuchu manage to escape with the help of other martial artists. However, Nameless is gravely injured and unable to recover quickly. He sends Cloud and Wind to seek Lord Wicked, the only person capable of defeating Godless. Wicked, who had abandoned his violent ways, reluctantly agrees to help after Wind's lover, Second Dream, convinces him.

Meanwhile, Cloud trains under a disguised Nameless at Linyi Temple. Nameless recognises Cloud's potential and creates a new sword movement. Godless discovers their location and sends his lieutenants, Earth and Sky, to kill Nameless. Cloud easily defeats them, but Wind interrupts his training to save Second Dream, who gets injured. Wind's departure halts his training prematurely.

Cloud sets out to confront Godless, who has taken the emperor hostage in search of the Dragon Tomb, which contains a secret linked to China's destiny. Cloud fights Heartless, Godless's son, and later engages in a battle with Godless himself. Despite Cloud's skills, Godless's armour renders him nearly invincible. However, a hidden entrance to the Dragon Tomb is revealed during their fight.

Wind, in a zouhuorumo state, arrives and fights with Godless, Cloud, and eventually both of them. He kills Godless and takes the Dragon Bone from the tomb. Cloud pursues Wind, while the emperor urges him to retrieve the Dragon Bone for the sake of China's fate.

Wind reaches a secret place mentioned in a letter from Second Dream, but he remains unresponsive. The emperor's guards attempt to reclaim the Dragon Bone, resulting in a struggle between the General and Heartless. As the bone breaks, Wind succumbs entirely to his zouhuorumo state, turning evil. Cloud arrives and fights Wind in an attempt to save him but fails, resulting in tragic consequences.

In a final act of sacrifice, Cloud pushes Wind and Second Dream to safety but plunges into the depths himself. Wind regrets that Cloud did not kill him earlier when he had the chance. The film ends abruptly, leaving Cloud's fate uncertain and Wind grieving over the choices made.

== Cast ==
- Aaron Kwok reprises his role as Striding Cloud, an unruly martial artist who is wanted by the Chinese emperor. He is kidnapped by Lord Godless and inadvertently uncovers Godless's secret plan to invade China. Kwok was "ecstatic" about acting in a sequel to The Storm Riders, despite realising how difficult the filming process would be. He prepared for the role by exercising and weight training. On the first day of filming, Kwok was injured in front of many reporters who were covering the act but he did not sustain any serious injury. Kwok described Cloud as "a very complex character, and people will see a more developed version of him here. He is more mature this time, and more 'human' too. You see him as a real human character, not just a comic character."
- Ekin Cheng reprises his role as Whispering Wind, a kindhearted and trustworthy martial artist. He is willing to sacrifice himself in order to save Cloud's life. He undertakes the path of evil to improve his prowess in martial arts in the fastest time possible to get rid of the Japanese invaders. Cheng reprises his role from the first film and decided to grow back his former long-hair extensions. He was excited about reprising his role and never thought that he would be able to reprise his role after appearing in the first film: "I've always liked the character, especially when I was reading the comics. I had wanted to make a Fung Wan movie even before The Storm Riders was made. I never thought I would be able to do it again 10 years later!"
- Simon Yam as Lord Godless, an evil Japanese warlord who desires to invade China. He captures and imprisons a large group of martial artists and the Chinese emperor. The character is based on the comic series' Japanese Invasion story arc, The Death Battle. During filming, Yam faced physical difficulties on the set. He had to perform with a blue and green screen, and dealt with the set's high temperature levels: "I have been acting for many years, I think this is the only time I had to change ten pairs of underwear daily. Everyday I was soaked. During the shoot I lost five pounds." Yam expressed that early in the shoot he had cramps. In order to replenish his energy he had to drink salt water.
- Charlene Choi as Second Dream, the only daughter of the "Broadsword King". She is well trained in using the broadsword as a child and inherits the great skills of her father. She aids Wind when Cloud is kidnapped by Godless. The Storm Warriors marks Choi and Ekin Cheng's fifth film collaboration as actors: "He and I have played lovers, couples, friends and siblings. Although we have played lovers many times before, this time felt very fresh perhaps due to the costume and the comic book background."
- Nicholas Tse as Heartless, the oldest son and competent assistant of Godless.
- Tiffany Tang as Chuchu, the daughter of Kirin Arm who accompanied Cloud on his nomadic journey. Tang replaces Shu Qi, who played Chuchu in the first film.
- Kenny Ho as Nameless, a martial arts legend who is regarded as the greatest enemy to Godless. He pins his hopes on Wind and Cloud to save the world.
- Lam Suet as Piggy King, an womanising martial artist who likes to fool around. He is entrusted by Nameless to lead Wind and Cloud to Lord Wicked.
- Kenny Wong as Lord Wicked, the senior of Piggy King. He is a reclusive and renowned martial arts master who broke his arms in order to relieve himself from evil power. Wind and Cloud seek his help to improve their skills.
- Patrick Tam as the Chinese emperor, who is kidnapped by Godless.

== Production ==
The Storm Warriors is based on Fung Wan, a manhua series created by Hong Kong artist Ma Wing-shing in 1984. The film was directed by Oxide Pang and his brother, Danny Pang, who served as a co-editor on the 1998 film The Storm Riders. The film was produced as part of the Pangs' ten-year motion picture deal with Universe Entertainment. A sequel to the 1998 film was first announced in March 2008. Film distributor Universe Entertainment gained rights to produce the film from Golden Harvest after the latter company's ten-year production rights to the Fung Wan franchise expired.

The film is based on Fung Wan's Japanese Invasion story arc The Death Battle, which follows Wind and Cloud as they fight against a Japanese warlord. The Pangs have stated that The Storm Warriors is not a direct sequel to The Storm Riders, but more of a stand-alone film with a separate storyline.

It was announced in April 2008 that the Pangs had changed the film's English title from The Storm Riders II to The Storm Warriors in order to avoid copyright conflicts. The name change was made to head off any potential copyright disputes with the comic's current license holder who is no longer associated with the film's financiers.

=== Casting ===
Ma Wing-shing was very concerned about the film's casting. He was especially adamant of Aaron Kwok and Ekin Cheng reprising their respective roles. Ma also dismissed that the actors might be too old for the film. He commented on the actors and their roles: "My concept of Cloud was someone with a tortured soul, and Aaron resembles the actual comic Cloud more today than he did 11 years ago. He is less baby-faced, and looks more mature and manly now...As for Ekin, he was more carefree in the first movie, but it will be more challenging for him this time around because he has to turn evil."

=== Filming ===
Aaron Kwok and Ekin Cheng, along with the Pang brothers, executive producer Daniel Lam and the film's crew celebrated production of the film with a traditional Thai blessing ceremony. Filming for The Storm Warriors began in April 2008 and ended in July 2008. Principal photography for the film took place entirely in three studios occupying 60,000 square feet (5,600 m^{2}) in Bangkok's Pak-Gret district. Filming consisted mainly of a Thai production crew, as the Pangs decided to shoot the film in Thailand, rather than in their native Hong Kong: "We wanted to shoot the whole film...because we trust them, and because it's probably cheaper than shooting in Hong Kong, even though we have to fly in some of the props and costumes." Members of the media and the film's distributors across Asia were invited to visit the shooting location. They also invited to view a fight scene between leading actors Ekin Cheng and Aaron Kwok as it was being filmed.

=== Design and effects ===
Visual effects for the film was produced by Fat Face Productions, which has been a leader in digital effects work for the Asian region with past credits that include The Warlords, and Kung Fu Hustle. The Storm Warriors is notable for being the first Chinese language film to be shot entirely in bluescreen and custom-made sets. The Pangs intended on giving their film a similar look and feel to that of the 2007 American film 300. The Pangs decided not to shoot the film entirely in bluescreen, as it would have gone over budgets and ruined the look of the film. Oxide Pang commented on the film's look: "We decided to make it more realistic-looking, and less like a comic book, but you will instantly know that it is a movie made out of a comic book just by looking at the background." During post-production, more than 1000 CGI shots involving the film's settings and background were created for the film.

== Release ==
The Storm Warriors was released theatrically in Hong Kong and Australia on 10 December 2009.

=== Marketing ===
Ma Wing-shing created a hand-drawn poster for The Storm Warriors for the Hong Kong Animation and Comic Book Convention in July 2009. Universe Entertainment later created a live-action version of Ma's poster. A theatrical trailer for the film premiered on the film's official website and in cinemas on 17 June 2009. The film's official website was launched in Beijing on 3 August 2009.

== Awards and nominations ==
Awards and nominations
Ceremony	Category	Recipient	Outcome
29th Hong Kong Film Awards	Best Art Direction	Yee Chung-Man, Lau Man-hung	Nominated
29th Hong Kong Film Awards	Best Costume Make Up Design	Yee Chung-Man, Dora Ng	Nominated
29th Hong Kong Film Awards	Best Action Choreography	Ma Yuk-sing	Nominated
29th Hong Kong Film Awards	Best Sound Design	Ken Wong, Phyllis Cheng, Lam Siu-yu	Nominated
29th Hong Kong Film Awards	Best Visual Effects	Ng Yuen-fai, Chas Chau, Tam Kai-kwan	Won
