= Kenny Ho =

Hong Kong actor and singer

- Born: Hong Kong
- Occupations: Actor; singer; businessman
- Years active: 1981–2013 (acting and singer career); 2013–present (business career)
- Partner(s): Kao Chin Su-mei (1989–1993); Anita Lee (1998–2001)
- Musical career
- Genres: Cantopop; Mandopop
- Labels: Sony Music (1982–1987); PolyGram (1988–1994)

Chinese name
- Traditional Chinese: 何家勁
- Simplified Chinese: 何家劲
- Hanyu Pinyin: Hé Jiājìn
- Jyutping: Ho^{4} Gaa^{1}-ging^{3}

Kenny Ho Kar-king is a Hong Kong actor and singer. He was best known for his role as Zhan Zhao in the Taiwanese and Mainland Chinese television series Justice Bao from 1993 to 2012, and is also known for his roles in other films and series. Ho is currently a businessman.

== Early life ==
Ho had an elder brother and sister. Ho's parents had since divorced. Ho wanted to be a football player at the university but he failed to qualify for the role. He also studied acting at Beijing University before joining the Shaw Brothers.

== Career ==
Ho enrolled in ATV's training institute in 1982 and officially became an ATV actor after signing a contract with the company the following year. He starred in various ATV dramas, most notably the series The Blood Sword in 1990 and 1991, adapted from Ma Wing-shing's manhua series Chinese Hero: Tales of the Blood Sword.

In 1988, Ho shifted his acting career to Taiwan and starred in his first Taiwanese television series, Eight Thousand Li of Cloud and Moon as the famous military general, Yue Fei (岳飛). The show was an instant hit and Ho became a household name. He continued making many television dramas produced by CTS, including Endless Love (不了情) opposite May Chin, Hongchen Youai (紅塵有愛), Shaonian Zhang Sanfeng (The Young Zhang Sanfeng) (少年張三豐), and The Book and the Sword. He has obtained a great level of fame in the Asian community for his portrayal as Zhan Zhao (展昭) in the 1993 Taiwanese television series Justice Bao. In 1994 he reprised his respective role as Zhan Zhao in 包 青 天 之 滳 血 紅 梅. All the original cast from Taiwan as well as new TVB actresses such as Vivian Chow and Esther Kwan was involved.

Ho starred in several films in the 1990s including Dragon in Jail opposite Andy Lau, Family Affairs, Red Zone, and Red Wolf. In 1997, he starred in the Taiwanese drama the Bodyguards series: Jade Dolls, Cryptic Crystal, and Heavenly Charm.

In 2009, he acted in the mainland Chinese television series Justice Bao. In the same year, he played "Nameless" in the Hong Kong wuxia fantasy film The Storm Warriors.

In 2010, he starred in the film Love Cuts with Singaporean actress Zoe Tay. He recently appeared in Treasure Inn alongside Nicholas Tse, Charlene Choi, and Nick Cheung.

Ho eventually went into the business field, and in 2014 he was appointed a "Tourist Embassidor" of Huei Zhou, where he opened a health food company called Jing Jia Zhuang (勁家莊), based on his last name. Ho promotes healthy eating and healthy living. Due to running his business, he suspended most his acting and singing work, with the exception of Justice Bao and occasional show performances in China. Ho has moved away from acting and singing since then.

== Personal life ==
Ho was in a relationship with the then Taiwanese actress May Chin. They first met on the set of the Taiwanese drama Endless Love in 1989. They began dating in the early 1990s and separated in 1993, and still remain good friends. The two agreed that if they are still single by the age of 60, then they would spend the rest of their lives together.

He was in relationship with Anita Lee. The pair met in Taiwan while filming in 1998. They separated after 4 years together in 2001.

Ho is currently single and has no children.

== Filmography ==
=== Film ===
Year	Title	Role	Notes
1984	Long Road to Gallantry (游俠情)	杜孟飛	
1984	The Occupant (靈氣逼人)		
1985	Twinkle, Twinkle Lucky Stars (夏日福星)		cameo
1986	Sweet Sixteen (甜蜜十六歲)		
1987	Eastern Condors (東方禿鷹)		
1987	That Enchanting Night (良青花奔月)		
1987	Project A 2 (A計劃續集)		
1988	Police Story 2 (警察故事續集)	PC-12674	
1990	Spooky Family II: Ghost Legend (麻衣傳奇）	Shi Wu/ Day Fifteen/十五	
1990	Whampoa Blues (壯志豪情)	程國勁	
1990	Dragon in Jail (獄中龍)	Wayne	
1994	Family Affairs (清官難審)	大畢	
1995	The Red Wolf (虎猛威龍)	阿龍	
1995	Red Zone (爆炸令)		
1995	No Justice for All (真相)		
2001	Blood Vow (血戰)		
2005	Wolves Attack (狼襲草原)	陶克	
2009	The Storm Warriors (風雲II)	Nameless	
2010	Love Cuts (割愛)	Chan Wai Mun	
2011	Treasure Inn (財神客棧)	Captain Iron	

=== Television series ===
Year	Title	Role	Notes
1985	The Legendary Prime Minister – Zhuge Liang (諸葛亮)	Lau Kei	
1988	Eight Thousand Li of Cloud and Moon (八千里路雲和月)	Yue Fei	
1989	Endless Love (不了情)	Gao Ting-Jiang	
1989	Lin Jue-Min (林覺民)	Lin Jue-Ming	
1989	Hongchen Youai (紅塵有愛)	Ho Jeng-Fei	
1990	The Blood Sword (中華英雄)	Wah Ying-hung	
1991	The Blood Sword 2 (中華英雄之中華傲訣)	Wah Ying-hung	
1991	Young Zhang Sanfeng (少年張三豐)	Zhang Sanfeng	
1992	Yuan (緣)	Hu Ji-Rong	
1992	The Book and the Sword (書劍恩仇錄)	Chen Jialuo	
1993	Justice Bao (包青天)	Zhan Zhao	
1997	Bodyguards 1 (保鏢之翡翠娃娃)	Guo Xu	
1998	Bodyguards 2 (保鏢之情人保鏢)	Guo Xu	
1998	Bodyguards 3 (保鏢之天之驕女)	Guo Xu	
1998	Beggar Emperor Zhu Yuanzhang (乞丐皇帝朱元璋)	Zhu Yuanzhang	
1999	Forrest Cat 2 (肥貓正傳II)	Anson	
2000	Great Hero Zheng Chenggong (大英雄鄭成功)	Zheng Chenggong	
2000	Master Ma 1 (馬永貞之爭霸上海灘)	Ma Yongzhen	
2001	Master Ma 2 (馬永貞之英雄血)	Ma Yongzhen	
2005	Vagabond Vigilante (游劍江湖)	Miao Chang Feng	
2008	Justice Bao (包青天)	Zhan Zhao	
2009	(滚滚血脉)	Liu Wen-an	
2010–2012	Justice Bao 1 (包青天之七俠五義)	Zhan Zhao	
