= The Blood Sword 2 =

1991 Hong Kong TV series

- VCD cover art
- 中華英雄之中華傲訣
- Genre: Wuxia
- Based on: Chinese Hero: Tales of the Blood Sword by Ma Wing-shing
- Screenplay by: Ng Mei-wah
- Directed by: Cheung Kin-wai; Cheng Wai-mun; Leung Chi-kin; Mai Kar-fung; Kwok Wai-sing
- Starring: Kenny Ho; Law Chung-wah; Veronica Yip; Yeung Chak-lam; Leung Sze-ho
- Opening theme: "Chinese Hero" (中華英雄) by Kenny Ho
- Ending theme: "Chinese Hero" (中華英雄) by Kenny Ho
- Composers: Wong Bong-yin; Fong Mun-tat; Ho Sai-kuen
- Country of origin: Hong Kong
- Original language: Cantonese
- No. of episodes: 20

Production
- Executive producer: Chan Toi-yuen
- Production location: Hong Kong
- Cinematography: Cheung Mun-fai; Siu Kwok-ping; Leung Fai-yuen; Ng Wai-hung
- Editor: Ng Mun-fai
- Running time: ≈40 minutes per episode
- Production company: ATV

Original release
- Network: ATV
- Release: 9 September 1991 – 1991

Related
- The Blood Sword (1990)

The Blood Sword 2 (中華英雄之中華傲訣) is a Hong Kong wuxia television series adapted from the manhua series Chinese Hero: Tales of the Blood Sword by Ma Wing-shing. The series was produced by ATV and first aired in September 1991. The series is a prequel to The Blood Sword (1990).

== Synopsis ==
The series is set in early 20th-century America. Hua Yingxiong and his family are sailing back to China from America when they are attacked by enemies. Hua Yingxiong's wife, Chen Jieyu, is killed by the attackers while their son and daughter are thrown overboard. Hua Yingxiong is devastated by the loss of his family, so he returns to America to seek vengeance on General Satan, the man responsible for his plight. He fails in his first attempt but is rescued by Sword Saint, an elderly swordsman who runs the inn China House in Chinatown. Sword Saint transfers part of his neigong to Hua Yingxiong and urges him to give up his desire for revenge. However, after General Satan constantly sends his henchmen to attack China House and mortally wound Sword Saint, Ying Hung fights his way into General Satan's base and slays him. He then returns to China House, where a dying Sword Saint makes him promise to never get involved in any conflict again. Hua Yingxiong agrees and spends the next 15 years of his life operating the inn, as well as raising Sword Saint's godchildren.

Unknown to Hua Yingxiong, his children had actually survived. His son, Hua Jianxiong, was saved and raised by his loyal servant, Shengnu. To avoid the Hell Clan, who have been pestering him to be their leader, Hua Jianxiong flees from China and travels to America to reunite with his father. Around the time, a notorious military-style mafia known as the Black Dragon Society has been planning to dominate Chinatown. Hua Yingxiong initially tries to keep a low profile and avoid conflict whenever possible, but subsequent events leave him with no choice but to interfere, especially when the mafia starts harassing and kidnapping Chinatown residents. Together with his son, close friends and allies, Hua Yingxiong organises the residents to put up resistance against the mafia.

At the same time, Hua Yingxiong also gets into trouble with the Shura School, a group of Japanese ninjas. He also falls in love with Muzi, who turns out to be General Satan's daughter. She is torn between her love for Hua Yingxiong and her desire to avenge her father. Concurrently, Hua Yingxiong faces a challenge from the overbearing Invincible, a blind Japanese swordsman who wants to be the most powerful swordsman in the world. As Hua Yingxiong loses some friends and loved ones along the way, he hears a prophecy from a fortune teller who said that he was born under the Star of Death and is destined to lead a life of loneliness because misfortune would befall everyone close to him. After Hua Yingxiong and his allies eliminate the Black Dragon Society and Shura School, Hua Yingxiong takes up Invincible's challenge and engages him in a duel. He defeats Invincible but falls off a cliff and is believed to be dead. However, he actually survived and intends not to reveal himself to his son and friends because he still believes in the prophecy about his future.

== Cast ==
- Kenny Ho as Hua Yingxiong, the protagonist. The titular Blood Sword refers to his weapon, a red-bladed sword.
- Law Chung-wah as Hua Jianxiong, Hua Yingxiong and Chen Jieyu's son.
- Veronica Yip as Chen Jieyu, Hua Yingxiong's wife.
- Yeung Chak-lam as Wudi (Invincible), a blind Japanese martial artist.
- Leung Sze-ho as Wuqing (Heartless), Wudi's son.
- Lin Wai-kin as Yuanwu, a martial artist and ally of Hua Yingxiong.
- Hung Chi-shing as Guipu, Hua Yingxiong's servant and close companion.
- Ho Mei-mei as Jisi, Guipu's wife.
- Pong Chau-ngan as Si-ao, Guipu's daughter.
- Chan Chek-wai as Shengnu, Hua Yingxiong's servant who raised Hua Jianxiong.
- Yeung Kar-lok as Luohan, Hua Yingxiong's close friend.
- Kingdom Yuen as Mingsha, Luohan's lover and the fortune teller who predicts Hua Yingxiong's life.
- Lee Lai-jui as Anna, the leader of a group of pickpockets who befriend Hua Yingxiong.
- Wai Lit as Jintaibao, the Gold Ninja and leader of the Shura School.
- Mak Lai-hung as Muzi, General Satan's daughter and the Wood Ninja of the Shura School.
- Cheng Kwan-chi as Huosilang, the Fire Ninja of the Shura School.
- Fennie Yuen as Shuiqianmian, the Water Ninja of the Shura School.
- Tam Wing-kit as Jinsanjue, the Earth Ninja of the Shura School.
- Law Yiu-hung as Xietong, Jintaibao's treacherous apprentice.
- Lam Mun-wai as Tianlangzi, the leader of the Heavenly Wolf Gang.
- Cheung Tsang as Sword Saint, an elderly swordsman who saves Hua Yingxiong from General Satan.
- Kwan Wai-lun as Bai Feng, the manager of China House.
- Leung Kam-san as Yuemenshen, one of the two guardians of China House.
- Tsang Tsan-on as Rimenshen, one of the two guardians of China House.
- Chan Pui-shan as Qing-er, Sword Saint's goddaughter who was raised by Hua Yingxiong.
- Lau Shek-yin as Zizai, Qing-er's brother.
- Chan Dik-wah as Baishe Zunzhe, a member of the Hell Clan.
- Chan Kim-wun as Duzong, a member of the Hell Clan.
- Szema Wah Lung as Tianluo Shenlao, Hua Jianxiong's master.
- Eddy Ko as General Satan, the founder of the Black Dragon Society.
- Fan Wing-wah as Dadaowang, General Satan's henchman.
- Cheng Shu-fung as Xinmo, General Satan's henchman.
- Lo Lieh as Kaxianlong, a corrupt politician who cooperates with the Black Dragon Society.
- Yu Kit-fu as Commander Black Dragon, the leader of the Black Dragon Society.
- Lo Chun-shun as Yinyangshi, Commander Black Dragon's effeminate henchman.
- Ding Ying as Zhensha, a member of the Black Dragon Society.
- Lau Chin-yu as Mingyue, a member of the Black Dragon Society.
- Yu Mun-bing as Shen Tianyang, a wealthy merchant who allies with Hua Yingxiong.
- Tong Kwok-ming as Shen Cunxiao, Shen Tianyang's son.
- Wong Shu-tong as Daozhong Wu-er, a blind Japanese martial artist who inspired Wudi.
- Tsui Man-wah as Taozi, Wudi's wife.

== See also ==
- Chinese Hero: Tales of the Blood Sword
- A Man Called Hero
- The Blood Sword
- The Legend of Hero
