= Ying Xiong Wu Lei =

Wuxia novel by Gu Long

- Author: Gu Long
- Original title: 英雄無淚
- Language: Chinese
- Genre: Wuxia
- Publisher: Publishing House of Minority Nationalities
- Publication date: 1988
- Publication place: China
- Media type: Print
- Pages: 390
- ISBN: 9787105006687

Ying Xiong Wu Lei (traditional Chinese: 英雄無淚; simplified Chinese: 英雄无泪; pinyin: Yīng Xióng Wú Lèi; lit. 'Heroes Shed No Tears') is a wuxia novel by Gu Long. It was first published between October 1978 and April 1979 in the Taiwanese newspaper United Daily News and subsequently reproduced by other publishing companies.

== Plot ==
Master Xiao (蕭大師), a reclusive swordsmith, started forging a precious sword known as the Tear-Stained Sword (淚痕劍). Upon its completion, the swordsmith foresaw that his son would die under the sword and that the sword is destined to bring disaster to the jianghu (martial artists' community). In order to prevent these events from happening, Master Xiao passed the sword to his youngest apprentice for safekeeping. Several years later, the sword came into the possession of Gao Jianfei (高漸飛), the apprentice of Master Xiao's youngest apprentice. Gao Jianfei receives instructions from his master to bring the sword into the jianghu.

At the time, there are two powerful organisations in the jianghu – the Great Security Service of Chang'an (長安大鏢局) and the Majestic Lion Clan of Luoyang (洛陽雄獅堂). Sima Chaoqun (司馬超群), the security service's chief, intends to recruit Yang Jian (楊堅), a traitor of the Majestic Lion Clan, to join the security service. In order to protect their reputation, the Majestic Lion Clan secretly hire an assassin to kill Yang Jian. Zhuo Donglai (卓東來), the second-in-command of the security service, makes extensive preparations to protect Yang Jian. When he meets Gao Jianfei, he initially suspects that Gao is the assassin so he keeps a close watch on him. However, Yang Jian ends up being killed by Xiao Leixue (蕭淚血), a mysterious martial artist carrying a secret weapon known as The Box (一口箱子).

Gao Jianfei strikes up a friendship with Zhu Meng (朱猛), the leader of the Majestic Lion Clan, and they become sworn brothers. Later, Zhuo Donglai arranges for Gao Jianfei to duel Sima Chaoqun. Before that, he sends a beautiful woman, Diewu (蝶舞), to seduce and distract Gao Jianfei, causing him to lose the duel. Xiao Leixue shows up and saves Gao Jianfei. When Zhu Meng returns to Luoyang, he realises that Zhuo Donglai has instigated some of his followers to turn against him. Zhu Meng survives and leads his remaining loyal followers to Chang'an to take his revenge against Zhuo Donglai. Zhuo Donglai invites both Zhu Meng and Gao Jianfei to meet him at a restaurant to settle their differences. It turns out that Zhuo Donglai has also sent Diewu to seduce Zhu Meng earlier. Diewu appears during their meeting and dances for them. It is part of Zhuo Donglai's plan to make Zhu Meng and Gao Jianfei fall in love with Diewu at the same time. However, Diewu refuses to be a pawn for Zhuo Donglai so she breaks her leg and leaves.

After defeating Zhu Meng and Gao Jianfei, Zhuo Donglai turns against Sima Chaoqun and overthrows him. Xiao Leixue turns out to be Master Xiao's son, and he has been searching for his long-lost younger brother and trying to avert the disaster foreseen by their father. He had initially thought that Gao Jianfei is his brother, hence he kept saving Gao whenever Gao was in danger. Gao Jianfei, Zhu Meng and Sima Chaoqun later join forces to deal with Zhuo Donglai, who manages to seize the Tear-Stained Sword. At this critical moment, Xiao Leixue appears and uses The Box to counter the Tear-Stained Sword. Gao Jianfei eventually kills Zhuo Donglai with the Tear-Stained Sword and the tear stain on the sword disappears, revealing that Zhuo Donglai is actually Master Xiao's younger son. The tragedy which Master Xiao foresaw ultimately becomes a reality.

== Adaptations ==
The cover of the first volume of the manhua series.

- Ying Xiong Wu Lei, a Hong Kong manhua series illustrated by Ma Wing-shing and published by Jonesky.
- Heroes Shed No Tears, a 1980 Hong Kong film directed by Chor Yuen and produced by the Shaw Brothers Studio.
- Hero Without Tears, a 1979 Hong Kong television series produced by TVB but aborted after only five episodes.
- Hero Without Tears II, a 1984 Hong Kong television series produced by TVB.
- Tearful Sword, a 2006 Chinese television series.
