= 1992 Jade Solid Gold Best Ten Music Awards Presentation =

Hong Kong music awards ceremony

The 1992 Jade Solid Gold Best Ten Music Awards Presentation (Chinese: 1992年度十大勁歌金曲頒獎典禮) was held in January 1993. It is part of the Jade Solid Gold Best Ten Music Awards Presentation series held in Hong Kong.

== Top 10 song awards ==
The top 10 songs (十大勁歌金曲) of 1992 are as follows.

Song name in Chinese	Artist
我來自北京	Leon Lai
分手總要在雨天	Jacky Cheung
真我的風采	Andy Lau
還是覺得你最好	Jacky Cheung
我的親愛	Leon Lai
醒醒	Sandy Lam
長夜多浪漫	Andy Lau
情人知己	Sally Yeh
第四晚心情	Aaron Kwok
容易受傷的女人	Faye Wong

== Additional awards ==
Award	Song name (if available for award)	Recipient(s)
The Most Popular Mandarin Song Award ( 最受歡迎國語歌曲獎 )
Gold award	瀟洒走一回	Sally Yeh
Silver award	對你愛不完	Aaron Kwok
Bronze award	認錯	Ukulele (優客李林)
The Best Duet Song Award ( 最受歡迎合唱歌曲獎)	相思風雨中	Jacky Cheung, Karen Tong (湯寶如)
The Best Composition Award ( 最佳作曲獎 )	瀟洒走一回	Music composers: Chan Dai Lik (陳大力), Chan Sau Nam (陳秀男); Performed by: Sally Yeh
The Best Lyric Award ( 最佳填詞獎 )	容易受傷的女人	Lyrics by: Calvin Poon (潘源良); Performed by: Faye Wong
The Best Music Arrangement Award ( 最佳編曲獎 )	瀟洒走一回	Music Arrangement by: Ricky Ho; Performed by Sally Yeh
The Best Song Producer Award ( 最佳歌曲監製獎 )	真情流露	Music producer: Michael Au; Performed by: Jacky Cheung
The Most Popular New Artist Award, Male singer ( 最受歡迎新人獎, 男歌手 )
Gold award	---	Jimmy Lin
Silver award	---	Dicky Cheung
Bronze award	---	Julian Cheung
The Most Popular New Artist Award, Female singer ( 最受歡迎新人獎, 女歌手 )
Gold award	---	Veronica Yip
Silver award	---	Karen Tong (湯寶如)
Bronze award	---	Elaine Ho (何婉盈)
The Best Music Video Award ( 最佳音樂錄影帶獎 )	You & Me	Director: Ronald Chin (錢國偉); Performed by: Aaron Kwok
The Best Music Video Performance Award ( 最佳音樂錄影帶演出獎 )	紅日, 舊歡如夢	Hacken Lee
The Most Popular Male Artist Award ( 最受歡迎男歌星獎 )	---	Andy Lau
The Most Popular Female Artist Award ( 最受歡迎女歌星獎 )	---	Sally Yeh
Gold Song Gold Award ( 金曲金獎 )	分手總要在雨天	Jacky Cheung
Jade Solid Gold Honour Award ( 金曲銀禧榮譽大獎 )	---	Anita Mui
