= Love Cuts =

2010 Singaporean film

- Theatrical release poster
- Traditional Chinese: 割愛
- Simplified Chinese: 割爱
- Literal meaning: "Parting ways"
- Hanyu Pinyin: Gē ài
- Directed by: Gerald Lee
- Screenplay by: Danny Yeo; Lee Shyh-jih
- Story by: Lim Teck
- Produced by: Sock Ling; Zhu Houren
- Starring: Zoe Tay; Kenny Ho
- Edited by: Tou Eijin
- Music by: Eric Ng
- Production companies: Clover Films; G & J Creation
- Distributed by: Clover Films
- Release date: 9 September 2010
- Running time: 118 minutes
- Country: Singapore
- Languages: Mandarin; Cantonese
- Box office: S$150,000

Love Cuts (Chinese: 割爱) is a 2010 Singaporean drama film directed by Gerald Lee. Commissioned by the Health Promotion Board of Singapore to encourage women of a certain age to get screened regularly for breast cancer, the film is among the first message films to be released in mainstream cinemas in Singapore. It revolves around two women who have been diagnosed with breast cancer, and how their loved ones respond with support and understanding while coping with their own fears of losing them. It stars Zoe Tay and Kenny Ho.

== Cast ==
=== Main and supporting ===
- Zoe Tay as Sissy Chang
- Kenny Ho as Chan Wai Mun
- Regene Lim as Mabel Chan
- Edwin Goh as Howard Chan
- Christy Yow as Kristie Kong
- Zhu Xiufeng as Sissy's mother
- Lin Ruping as Lady boss
- Chen Zhiguang as Chinese restaurant boss
- Choo Hoh Kin as Chemotherapy doctor
- Wen Guoxian as Love 97.2FM DJ
- Renee Ye as Love 97.2FM DJ

=== Special appearances ===
- Allan Wu as Timothy Tang
- Desmond Tan as Young customer
- Andy Lee as Stylist
- Jalyn Han as Food delivery lady
- Huang Shinan as Disgruntled customer
- Zhu Houren as Sissy's doctor

== Awards and nominations ==
Year	Awards	Category	Recipient(s) and nominee(s)	Result	Ref.
2011	Singapore e-Awards	Best Local Film	—N/a	Nominated	
2011	Singapore e-Awards	Best Local Director	Gerald Lee	Nominated	
