= Come Drink with Me =

1966 Hong Kong film by King Hu

- Hong Kong theatrical poster
- 大醉俠
- Directed by: King Hu
- Written by: King Hu; Ting Shan-hsi
- Produced by: Run Run Shaw
- Starring: Cheng Pei-pei; Yueh Hua; Chan Hung-lit
- Cinematography: Nishimoto Tadashi
- Edited by: Chiang Hsing-lung
- Music by: Chow Lan-ping
- Production company: Shaw Brothers Studio
- Distributed by: Shaw Brothers Studio
- Release date: 7 April 1966
- Running time: 91 minutes
- Country: Hong Kong
- Language: Mandarin
- Box office: 12,892 tickets (France)

Come Drink with Me (大醉俠) is a 1966 Hong Kong wuxia film produced by the Shaw Brothers Studio and directed by King Hu. Set in China during the Ming dynasty, it starred Cheng Pei-pei, Yueh Hua and Chan Hung-lit in the leading roles, and features action choreography by Han Ying-chieh.

Considered one of the greatest wuxia films of all time, Come Drink with Me was both a critical and commercial success, and launched the career of Cheng Pei-pei as a star of the wuxia genre. It was selected as the Hong Kong entry for the Best Foreign Language Film at the 39th Academy Awards, but was not nominated.

== Plot ==
Zheng Bi-qiu, a provincial magistrate and the son of the governor, is kidnapped by the bandit Jade-Faced Tiger. Tiger demands Zheng release his imprisoned master, but when the principled man refuses, he instead holds him for ransom: demanding to the Governor that the master be released in five days, or his son will be killed.

The Governor's other child, a young woman known as Golden Swallow, is sent to rescue her brother. Initially disguised as a man, Golden Swallow is herself an adept swordfighter and martial artist, demonstrating her skills against Tiger's bandits when they confront her at a local inn.

A local beggar, known as Drunken Cat, acts as Golden Swallow's guardian angel, covertly saving her from an ambush attempt later that night. When Golden Swallow goes to thank him the next day, he feigns ignorance, appearing only as a hedonistic drunkard collecting scraps with his army of children. However, he covertly communicates the bandits whereabouts via a coded message in a song, describing the traditional Chinese character meaning temple (廟).

Jade-Faced Tiger's gang have occupied a local Buddhist monastery with the support of its corrupt abbot, Liao Kung. Golden Swallow penetrates the compound disguised as a parishioner, but is swiftly found out by Jade-Faced Tiger and forced into a confrontation. Despite her skills, she is woefully outnumbered, and, with Drunken Cat's covert assistance, narrowly escapes with her life. During the brawl, she is injured by one of Tiger's poison-tipped darts. She is rescued in the woods by Drunken Cat, who nurses her back to health.

While she is convalescing, Golden Swallow learns that Drunken Cat is actually Fan Da-pei, a Shaolin master and a leader of the Green Wand Kung Fu school, which he otherwise keeps a secret. Liao Kung is Fan's blood brother, having brought him into the martial arts society when he was a starving orphan. Greedy for power, Liao Kung killed their master to take over the school, and sought the valuable bamboo staff that is their symbol, which Fan has obtained. Although Liao Kung claims to be the legitimate heir to the throne, as he was the most senior student, Fan maintains that his murderous deeds have negated that right. However, he is unwilling to fight his blood brother, both out of gratitude for saving his life, and because of Liao's superior skills.

Fan negotiates a prisoner exchange between Zheng Bi-qiu and the bandits' master. However, after Bi-qiu is handed released, Fan ambushes the bandits and prevents them from releasing their leader. As the government soldiers march the bandit leader back to prison, the bandits attack the procession. Golden Swallow, leading her female warriors, manages to fight them off, killing all but Jade-Faced Tiger, who is spared at the intervention of Liao Kung. A fight with Fan ensues, and he holds his blood brother at swordpoint, demanding he reform his evil ways in exchange for his life. Liao seemingly agrees, but then later attacks Fan at his house. In their final confrontation, Fan kills Liao with their master's bamboo staff.

== Cast ==
- Cheng Pei-pei as "Golden Swallow" Zheng
- Yueh Hua as "Drunken Cat" Fan Da-pei
- Chan Hung-lit as Jade-Faced Tiger
- Lee Wan-chung as "Smiling-Tiger" Tsu Kan
- Yeung Chi-hing as Abbot Liao Kung
- Wong Chung as Zheng Bi-qiu
- Shum Lo as "Number Five", bandit
- Wang Ruo-Ping as "Baldie", bandit
- Han Ying-chieh, Yuen Siu-tien, Ku Feng and Ting Shan-hsi as bandits
- Hao Li-jen as Elder Monk
- Cheung Hei as Innkeeper
- Jackie Chan, Mars and Alan Chui Chung-San as beggar children
- Ching Siu-tung as Novice
- Angela Pan as Soldier

== Production ==
Come Drink with Me was shot on-location in Taiwan and at the Shaw Brothers Studio in Hong Kong. It was the breakthrough role for actress Cheng Pei-pei, who was only 19 years old at the time of filming. Cheng did not have a martial arts background, but was a trained ballet dancer and choreographer, which director King Hu found conducive to his style of action filmmaking.

Hu told critic Tony Rayns (quoted in Bey Logan's book) that he had deliberately chosen a ballet dancer for the lead female role, "... rather than fighting. I'm very interested in Peking opera and particularly its movement and action effects, although I think it's difficult to express them adequately on stage, where the physical limitations are too great". King Hu was said to recognise that some of the fights are stylised as opposed to realistic but claimed that combat in his movies was "always keyed to the notion of dance".

Jackie Chan is rumoured to have appeared as one of the child singers near the beginning of the film. Lead actress Cheng Pei-pei denied this in the audio commentary to the Hong Kong DVD release of the film. Still, the film is listed among Chan's acting credits on his official website and autobiography.

== Release and reception ==
The film was a great success upon its release in Hong Kong, and made a star of Cheng Pei-pei and others.

In 1966, the 13th Asian Film Festival (AFF) was held in Seoul, Korea. The AFF's director that year was Shin Sang-ok and encountered Hu's Come Drink with Me (1965) at the festival. The films title was changed to Banganangui Gyeoltu (lit. 'Duel of the Drifters') and was officially distributed at the Paramount theater in Seoul on April 1967. The film became the first Hong Kong film to be screened in Korea and quickly became the number one highest grossing foreign-language film of the year in the country, drawing in 300,000 spectators in Seoul alone.

== Home video ==
In 2003, Intercontinental Video Limited (IVL), through Celestial Pictures, released a digitally restored version of this classic film with a new trailer and interviews, including Cheng Pei-pei.

In May 2008, Dragon Dynasty released their own edition with an improved transfer, the original Mandarin mono soundtrack and exclusive supplements, including a newly recorded audio commentary with Cheng Pei-pei, trailers, and interviews with the cast (Cheng Pei-pei, Yueh Hua) and director King Hu.

== Sequel ==
A sequel, Golden Swallow, was released in 1968. Cheng Pei-pei reprised her role, with Jimmy Wang Yu as her male co-star.

== Unproduced remake ==
Producers Bob and Harvey Weinstein announced in April 2007 that they would invest in movies with Asian themes. One of the movies they announced was a remake of Come Drink with Me, directed by Quentin Tarantino and to be distributed by Metro-Goldwyn-Mayer and The Weinstein Company with Celestial Pictures producing. However, little has been heard of the project since then, and in June 2008, Tarantino announced his next project would be Inglourious Basterds, leaving the status of the remake undisclosed.

== See also ==
- List of submissions to the 39th Academy Awards for Best Foreign Language Film
- List of Hong Kong submissions for the Academy Award for Best Foreign Language Film
