= The Storm Riders =

1998 Hong Kong film by Andrew Lau

- Film poster
- 風雲雄霸天下
- Directed by: Andrew Lau
- Screenplay by: Manfred Wong; Chau Ting
- Based on: Fung Wan by Ma Wing-shing
- Produced by: Manfred Wong
- Starring: Aaron Kwok; Ekin Cheng; Sonny Chiba; Kristy Yang; Michael Tse; Roy Cheung; Jason Chu; Shu Qi; Wan Yeung-ming
- Cinematography: Andrew Lau
- Edited by: Marco Mak; Danny Pang
- Music by: Chan Kwong-wing
- Production companies: Golden Harvest; Bob and Partners; Centro Digital Pictures; Tian Shan Film Studio
- Distributed by: Golden Harvest
- Release date: 31 August 1998
- Running time: 126 minutes
- Country: Hong Kong
- Language: Cantonese
- Budget: HK$85 million
- Box office: HK$41.4 million (US$5.34 million)

The Storm Riders (風雲雄霸天下) is a 1998 Hong Kong wuxia film adapted from the manhua series Fung Wan by artist Ma Wing-shing. Directed by Andrew Lau, it starred Ekin Cheng and Aaron Kwok. The story follows two boys – Wind and Cloud – who are trained by the warlord Lord Conqueror to become formidable warriors, but ultimately team up to defeat their evil master. A sequel, The Storm Warriors, was directed by the Pang brothers and released in 2009.

== Synopsis ==
Lord Conqueror is the leader of the Under Heaven Society, and he seeks to conquer the martial arts world. Mud Buddha, a fortune teller, predicts that even the masters Nameless in the south and Sword Saint in the north will be no match for Lord Conqueror, but his duel with Sword Saint will have to wait for another ten years. He gives Lord Conqueror the first half of the prophecy, stating that if he takes Wind and Cloud as his disciples, he will be invincible for the first half of his life, and provides the birth charts to help find Wind and Cloud.

Mud Buddha also gives Conqueror a special Persian box containing the second half of the prophecy, which is booby trapped to explode if one attempts to open it with force. To open it safely, Conqueror must solve a complicated puzzle mechanism, which he is confident he will be able to. In the meantime, Conqueror orders his right hand man, Jester, to use all available means to find Wind and Cloud.

Lord Conqueror then lures Wind's father, Whispering Prince, to Ling Wan cave for a duel and reveals he seduced Wind's mother two years ago to ensure he would fight the duel seriously with the Blizzard Blade, one of the world's ten greatest weapons that Lord Conqueror seeks. After this revelation, Wind's mother commits suicide in front of Wind. Wind cries out to his father, distracting him before the final exchange of blows and allowing Conqueror to knock him down, where he is then consumed by flames coming from the cave. Conqueror then pretends to rescue an unconscious Wind.

Meanwhile, Conqueror's army is attacking Bou Village, having tracked down Cloud's location and the Ultimate Sword that Cloud's father, Striding Sky, forged. The villagers attempt to fight back but are massacreed by Conqueror's men and Striding Sky is killed after revealing that he destroyed the Ultimate Sword and it is impossible to use it without his blood or that of his son's. A traumatized Cloud watches his father die in front of his eyes and is captured by Conqueror's men.

After taking Wind and Cloud as his disciples, Lord Conqueror receives a message from Sword Saint postponing their duel for another ten years, proving Mud Buddha's prediction was right. Wind and Cloud train to become formidable martial artists and they grow close with Charity, Conqueror's daughter. With Wind and Cloud's help, Conqueror manages to conquer most of the martial arts world except for his rival, Sword Saint. One day, Wind sneaks into the forbidden sword grave with Charity for a date before they are summoned by Lord Conqueror.

For the past ten years, Lord Conqueror has been unable to unlock the Persian box containing the second half of the prophecy and Mud Buddha has also gone missing. Conqueror orders Wind and Frost, his adopted son, to locate Mud Buddha. Meanwhile, Cloud is sent to bring back the Matchless Sword from Dukgu Yat-fong in Matchless city as he wishes to become an ally. Secretly, Conqueror also orders Cloud to kill him. Afterwards, Cloud demands to know whether Wind has visited the forbidden sword grave with Charity, and Wind confesses they did. Cloud then visits Charity in secret and they have sex.

Wind and Frost locate Mud Buddha, but he is kidnapped by Lord Conqueror in disguise as he wishes to keep the second half of the prophecy secret. Mud Buddha opens the Persian box and reveals the second half of the prophecy, which states that Wind and Cloud will bring about Lord Conqueror's downfall, but he refuses to accept his fate.

Meanwhile, Cloud and his men kill all the inhabitants of Matchless City, including Dukgu Yat-fong. Dukgu Ming, the son of Dukgu Yat-fong returns to find everyone dead, and begs his uncle, Sword Saint, to help him take revenge on the Under Heaven society. Knowing that Cloud is in love with Charity, Conqueror decides to have Wind marry Charity to create a conflict between them. Charity likes both Wind and Cloud, but decides to go along with the marriage to Wind.

During the wedding celebrations, Cloud storms the wedding and attempts to leave with Charity, although Charity tries to persuade him that she could marry Wind and still see Cloud in secret. Conqueror manipulates Wind into attacking Cloud and then attempts to sneak attack them while they are fighting, but Charity intervenes and is accidentally killed by his attack. Before dying, Charity admits she loved both Wind and Cloud. Cloud escapes with Charity's body but is pursued and loses his arm fighting Conqueror, before collapsing at a river.

Doctor Yu Ngok saves Cloud's life and transplants his Fire Beast arm to Cloud as his body has been rejecting it ever since he obtained it. Doctor Yu's daughter, Muse, helps Cloud recover from the surgery before leaving on a journey with him. Conqueror then orders Wind to retrieve Blood Bodhi fruits from Ling Wan cave, which can boost one's martial arts prowess. Conqueror's men poison Wind after he retrieves his father's Blizzard Blade, but he is saved when the cave's guardian, the Fire Dragon, attacks. Wind eats the fruit to save himself from the poison and then defeats the dragon.

Lord Conqueror achieves a new level of power with his training and Jester praises him as fulfilling destiny. This angers Conqueror as Mud Buddha had already revealed his destiny was to fall by the hands of Wind and Cloud. Conqueror orders Frost to get rid of him, but in order to save his life, Jester takes Frost to see the imprisoned Mud Buddha, revealing that Conqueror was the one who kidnapped him that day. Mud Buddha tells Frost that Conqueror was the one who killed Wind and Cloud's parents. When Wind returns, Frost takes him to see Mud Buddha and hear the second half of the prophecy directly from him.

The next day, Sword Saint arrives for his duel with Lord Conqueror. Standing outside Conqueror's hall, he creates an astral body to fight him inside. Conqueror's army attempts to attack him, but Sword Saint immobilizes everyone present with his energy and even Conqueror is unable to move. Sword Saint wounds and is about to kill Conqueror when Cloud arrives outside with Muse, Yu Ngok's daughter. Muse touches Sword Saint's real body outside the hall out of curiosity, which scatters his astral body inside the hall, killing Sword Saint and most of the people in the hall except for Conqueror, Dukgu Ming and Sik Mo-zeon, the Shaolin monk accompanying him.

Dukgu Ming attempts to attack Conqueror but is easily killed, and his body is taken away by Sik Mo-zeon. Cloud climbs the steps to find Wind waiting for him. Wind reveals that Mud Buddha has revealed they must unite to become a storm in order to defeat Conqueror and offers Cloud a Blood Bodhi fruit to boost his powers. Frost enters the hall to find everyone dead, confronts Conqueror with his crimes, and attempts to leave the Under Heaven Society but is killed just as Wind and Cloud arrive.

Wind and Cloud attempt to fight Conqueror in the Forbidden Sword Grave, but they are no match for him until Cloud's blood reveals the hidden Ultimate Sword that Cloud's father hid. With the Ultimate Sword, they are able to defeat Conqueror. He loses his martial arts and goes insane, seeing visions of all the people who died because of him. Cloud attempts to kill him but Wind stops him so that Conqueror can live with his failures for the rest of his life.

== Cast ==
- Aaron Kwok as Striding Cloud
- Ekin Cheng as Whispering Wind
- Sonny Chiba as Lord Conqueror
- Kristy Yang as Charity
- Michael Tse as Frost
- Roy Cheung as Shaolin Monk
- Jason Chu as Ming
- Wayne Lai as Mud Bodhisattva
- Lawrence Cheng as Jester
- Anthony Wong as Sword Saint
- Alex Fong as Whispering Prince
- Yu Rongguang as Striding Sky
- Shu Qi as Muse
- Wan Yeung-ming as Summit Yu
- Christine Ng as Ying
- Dion Lam as Hawk
- Ng Chi-hung as Bat
- Elvis Tsui as Seedy Sword
- Lee Siu-kei as Dragon
- Xu Jinglei as Phoenix

== Release ==
The film had special screening in the Filmmaker in Focus: Andrew Lau section of the 25th New York Asian Film Festival on 13 July 2026 as part of the 25th anniversary of the festival.

== Awards and nominations ==
Awards and nominations
Ceremony	Category	Recipient	Outcome
18th Hong Kong Film Awards	Best Film	The Storm Riders	Nominated
18th Hong Kong Film Awards	Best Actor	Sonny Chiba	Nominated
18th Hong Kong Film Awards	Best Supporting Actress	Shu Qi	Nominated
18th Hong Kong Film Awards	Best Cinematography	Andrew Lau	Nominated
18th Hong Kong Film Awards	Best Film Editing	Marco Mak, Danny Pang	Won
18th Hong Kong Film Awards	Best Costume Make Up Design	Lee Pik-kwan	Won
18th Hong Kong Film Awards	Best Art Direction	Cyrus Ho	Nominated
18th Hong Kong Film Awards	Best Action Choreography	Dion Lam	Nominated
18th Hong Kong Film Awards	Best Original Film Score	Chan Kwong-wing	Won
18th Hong Kong Film Awards	Best Original Film Song	Song: "Sudden" (驚變) Composer: Davy Tam; Lyricist: Siu Mei; Singer: Aaron Kwok	Nominated
18th Hong Kong Film Awards	Best Original Film Song	Song: "Wind and Cloud" (風雲) Composer: Chan Kwong-wing; Lyricist: Lin Xi; Singer: Ekin Cheng	Nominated
18th Hong Kong Film Awards	Best Sound Design	Golden Harvest, Central Digital Pictures	Won
35th Golden Horse Awards	Best Costume Make Up Design	Lee Pik-kwan	Won
35th Golden Horse Awards	Best Art Direction	Cyrus Ho	Nominated
35th Golden Horse Awards	Best Action Choreography	Dion Lam	Nominated
35th Golden Horse Awards	Best Original Film Song	Song: "Bugs Fly" (蟲兒飛) Composer: Chan Kwong-wing; Lyricist: Lin Xi; Singer: Ekin Cheng	Nominated
35th Golden Horse Awards	Best Visual Effects	Central Digital Pictures	Won
35th Golden Horse Awards	Best Sound Design	Kinson Tsang	Nominated
4th Golden Bauhinia Awards	Top Ten Chinese-language film	The Storm Riders	Won
5th Hong Kong Film Critics Society Awards	Film of Merit	The Storm Riders	Won

== Sequel ==
Ekin Cheng and Aaron Kwok returned for the sequel, reprising their respective roles as Wind and Cloud. The film was helmed by the Pang brothers and followed the "Japanese Invasion" story arc of the comics. Cheng and Kwok are joined by new cast members Nicholas Tse, Charlene Choi, Tiffany Tang and Simon Yam.
