= Golden Swallow (1968 film) =

1968 Hong Kong film by Chang Cheh

- Film poster
- 金燕子
- Directed by: Chang Cheh
- Written by: Chang Cheh; Tu Yun-chih
- Produced by: Runme Shaw
- Starring: Jimmy Wang; Cheng Pei-pei; Lo Lieh; Chao Hsin-yen
- Cinematography: Pao Hsueh-li
- Edited by: Chiang Hsing-lung
- Music by: Wang Foo-ling
- Production company: Shaw Brothers Studio
- Release date: 4 April 1968 (Hong Kong)
- Running time: 104 minutes
- Country: Hong Kong
- Language: Mandarin

Golden Swallow (金燕子) is a 1968 Hong Kong wuxia film directed by Chang Cheh, serving as a sequel to the 1966 film Come Drink with Me.

== Synopsis ==
Golden Swallow is forced into violence when a figure from her mysterious past goes on a killing rampage while leaving evidence that holds her responsible. Golden Swallow gets involved with a love triangle involving a mad, but righteous, swordsman named Silver Roc and a gentle warrior named Golden Whip. The three team up to defeat evil forces in the jianghu, but their joint venture only lasts so long, due to the two men's egos. Ultimately, a duel to the death is planned between them, leaving Golden Swallow caught between two men, both of whom she admires.

== Cast ==
- Cheng Pei-pei as Golden Swallow
- Jimmy Wang as Silver Roc
- Lo Lieh as Golden Whip
- Chao Hsin-yen as Mei Niang
- Wu Ma as Flying Fox
- Yeung Chi-hing as Poison Dragon
- Hoh Ban as Golden Dragon Branch chief

== Production ==
Chang Cheh stated that he disregarded a historical backdrop for the film to give the story more creative freedom. It was also his first time partnering with Ni Kuang to write the script. Cheh said that Ni "quickly picked up the techniques of scriptwriting — The Invincible Fist (1969) was simply a masterstroke by a gifted writer! The ensemble of characters was each vividly portrayed and the script depicted the four seasons with a sensibility rarely found in Chinese films. I also heightened the romantic sub-plot of 'The Golden Swallow' which centres on the triangular love relationship between Jimmy Wang, Lo Lieh and Cheng Pei-pei". The Shaw Brothers intended to base the script on the character of Golden Swallow character in King Hu's Come Drink with Me. After several script rewrites, the characters bear little to no resemblance to the original characters from Come Drink with Me. Chang also stated he took influence from Japanese cinema at the period, and chose to shoot the film entirely in Japan.

== Release ==
Golden Swallow was distributed in Hong Kong on April 4, 1968. The film was among the ten top-grossing Mandarin films of 1968. It was the third-highest grossing film in Hong Kong for the year behind You Only Live Twice and Dragon Inn.

== Reception ==
From contemporary reviews, "Harr." of Variety stated the film was in competition with Italian Western as "one of the bloodiest films ever released" and that "the nauseating degree of violence and bloodshed in this film recommends it only for sadistic, exploitation situations".

From a retrospective review, Donald Guarisco of AllMovie wrote that the film was "full of outrageous bloodletting, over-the-top melodrama and plenty of machismo", and depending on the viewers' tolerance of these elements, the film "offers plenty of rewards for those who can appreciate action filmmaking at its most extreme". Guarisco found that "the plotting doesn't always make sense and Cheng Pei-Pei [...] is unfortunately sidelined by the film's male-centric story line. That said, Hsia Yu-Yen delivers all the thrills a kung-fu film should offer and is well worth the time for genre enthusiasts thanks to its historic importance as an early Chang Cheh classic".
