= Master Ma =

- Master Ma intertitle
- 馬永貞之爭霸上海灘 / 馬永貞之英雄血
- Genre: Martial arts drama
- Screenplay by: Wai-ma Group
- Directed by: Fan Sau-ming; Wong Kun-fai
- Starring: Kenny Ho; Yu Hsiao-fan; Anita Lee; Cheng Pei-pei; Chan Hung-lit; Norman Chui; Fan Bingbing; Howie Huang
- Theme music composer: Wong Bong-yin
- Opening theme: "Men of Iron Blood" (鐵血男兒) by Ngan Chun-lam
- Countries of origin: Hong Kong; Taiwan
- Original language: Mandarin
- No. of seasons: 2
- No. of episodes: 22 (season 1); 20 (season 2)

Production
- Executive producers: Lau Man-ban; Luk Bo-chuen; So Kwok-leung
- Producers: Fan Sau-ming; Ngai Ho-wo; Chow Hiu-fung; Choi Yu-ban; Ma Kit; Chow Ling-gong
- Production locations: Hong Kong; Taiwan
- Cinematography: Lau Tat-shing; Kwok Chi-yan; Chow Chun-lun
- Editor: Chiu Hung-shing
- Running time: 45 minutes per episode
- Production companies: ATV; CTV

Original release
- Network: ATV; CTV

Master Ma is a 1998 Hong Kong-Taiwanese two-season television series produced by the television stations ATV and CTV. It is loosely based on the life of Ma Yongzhen (馬永貞), a prominent 19th-century Hui Chinese martial artist. The series was directed by Fan Sau-ming and starred Kenny Ho as the eponymous character.

== Plot ==
=== Season 1 ===
The series is set in the Warlord Era of early 20th-century China. Ma Yongzhen and his mother, Ma Daniang, live in Shandong, where they raise horses for Marshal Duan's army. One night, the stables mysteriously catch fire and the horses are lost. The marshal's men arrest Ma Yongzhen and his mother and prepare to execute them for their negligence, but they escape from prison. Ma Yongzhen later makes his way alone to Shanghai to earn a new living.

In Shanghai, Ma Yongzhen becomes famous after winning a horse race and martial arts tournament. However, he also gets into trouble with the two most powerful gangs in Shanghai: the White Gang led by Bai Laili and the Wuhu Gang led by Xue Changchun. At the same time, he starts a romance with Liu Juchi, an opera singer and Xue Changchun's mistress. With the help of Duan Lengcui and others, Ma Yongzhen forms the Zhendong Gang to help the poor and fight injustice, unlike the other gangs. At the end of Season 1, Ma Yongzhen and his Zhendong Gang destroy the Wuhu Gang and make an uneasy peace with the White Gang.

=== Season 2 ===
Season 2 revolves around a rivalry between Ma Yongzhen and Bai Laili. Bai Laili resorts to various cunning means in his attempt to destroy Ma Yongzhen and the Zhendong Gang. First, he sends his men to infiltrate the Zhendong Gang and steal a shipment of foreign goods from their warehouses. Next, he orders his henchman, Tang Biao, to assassinate the French consul and frame Ma Yongzhen for the murder. Eventually, Duan Lengcui's father, who turns out to be Marshal Duan, helps Ma Yongzhen clear his name and resolve the crisis. With Marshal Duan's support, Ma Yongzhen manages to thwart the White Gang's schemes.

At the same time, Ma Yongzhen's feelings for Liu Juchi gradually diminish as he becomes more romantically attracted to Duan Lengcui and they are eventually engaged. Marshal Duan and the Japanese consul convince Ma Yongzhen to support them in opening a hospital to provide medical services for the poor in Shanghai and improve Sino-Japanese ties. However, Ma Yongzhen and his friends later discover that Marshal Duan is secretly collaborating with the Japanese to develop biological weapons in the hospital. In return, the Japanese will aid the marshal in defeating the Kuomintang government. At the same time, Ma Yongzhen encounters Kimura, a hostile Japanese karateka working for Bai Laili.

== Cast ==
- Kenny Ho as Ma Yongzhen (馬永貞) – the protagonist and boss of the Zhendong Gang
- Grace Yu as Liu Juchi (柳菊池) – an opera singer who is also Xue Changchun's mistress and Ma Yongzhen's first romantic partner
- Anita Lee as Duan Lengcui (段冷翠) – Marshal Duan's daughter and Ma Yongzhen's second romantic partner
- Cheng Pei-pei as Ma Daniang (馬大娘) – Ma Yongzhen's mother
- Chan Hung-lit as Bai Laili (白癩痢) – the boss of the White Gang
- Norman Chui as Xue Changchun (薛長春) – the boss of the Wuhu Gang
- Fan Bingbing as Bai Xiaodie (白小蝶) – Bai Laili's daughter who turns out to be Ma Yongzhen's long-lost younger sister Ma Suzhen
- Howie Huang as Sun Jisheng (孫濟生) – a doctor and Kuomintang spy who becomes Bai Xiaodie's romantic partner
- Yang Sheng as Jiang Shiguang (蔣世光 – a policeman in Shanghai who befriends Ma Yongzhen
- Lin Jing as Wenjing (文靜) – a journalist and Jiang Shiguang's romantic partner
- Cheng Sihan as Lu Kuangtian (盧況天) – a warlord who takes control of Shanghai
- Lung Tien-hsiang as Tang Biao (唐彪) – Bai Laili's right-hand man
- He Zhonghua as Luo Zhan (羅湛) – Xue Changchun's henchmen who later becomes a Kuomintang spy
- Chang Chen-huan as Duan Tianfeng (段天峰) – a warlord who takes control of Shanghai
- Mondi Yau as Chen Jiamei (陳嘉美) – a Japanese spy in disguise as a courtesan who becomes Bai Laili's mistress
- Shen Meng-sheng as Ding Xianjin (丁先進) – a businessman who starts a drama troupe to provide free entertainment to the poor and becomes Liu Juchi's romantic partner
- Kou Zhanwen as Kimura (木村) – a ruthless Japanese karateka working for Bai Laili

== Remake ==
The series was remade in 2012 as a mainland Chinese television series titled Ma Yongzhen, directed by Kuk Kwok-leung and starring Danny Chan as Ma Yongzhen. Norman Chu and He Zhonghua are cast in the remake as Bai Laili and Xue Changchun respectively.

== See also ==
- Boxer from Shantung, a 1972 Hong Kong film based on the life of Ma Yongzhen.
