= Cheng Pei-pei =

Chinese actress (1946–2024)

- 鄭佩佩
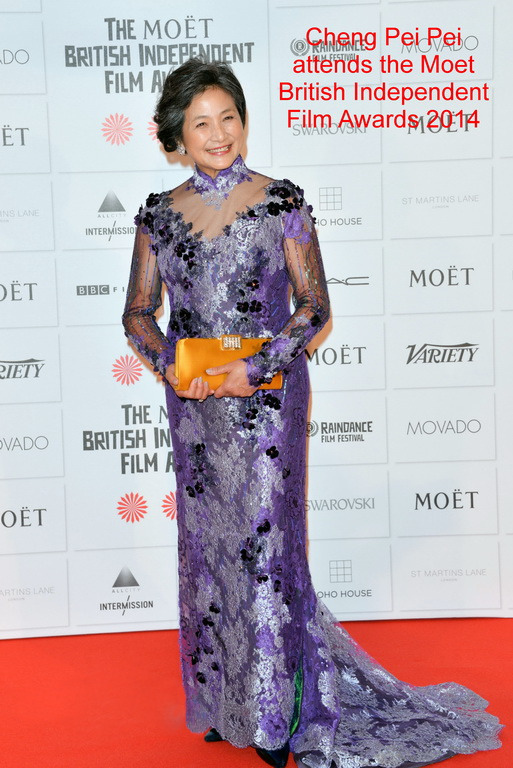
- Cheng in 2014
- Born: Jiang Pei-pei; 6 January 1946; Shanghai, China
- Died: 17 July 2024 (aged 78); San Francisco Bay Area, California, U.S.
- Citizenship: United States
- Occupation: Actress
- Years active: 1963–2020
- Spouse: Yuan Wen-tung (m. 1970; div. 1987)
- Children: 4, including Eugenia Yuan
- Awards: Hong Kong Film Awards – Best Supporting Actress; 2000 Crouching Tiger, Hidden Dragon

Chinese name
- Traditional Chinese: 鄭佩佩
- Simplified Chinese: 郑佩佩
Transcriptions
Standard Mandarin
- Hanyu Pinyin: Zhèng Pèipèi
- Wade–Giles: Cheng^{4} P'ei^{4}-p'ei^{4}
- IPA: [ʈʂə̂ŋ pʰêɪpʰêɪ]
Yue: Cantonese
- Jyutping: Zeng^{6} Pui^{3}-pui^{3}

Cheng Pei-pei (6 January 1946 – 17 July 2024) was a Hong Kong-American actress who was considered cinema's first female action hero. Popularly known as "Queen of Swords" and "Queen of Martial Arts Films", Cheng starred in numerous successful wuxia and martial arts films in Hong Kong, including the Shaw Brothers-produced Come Drink with Me (1966), which launched Cheng into stardom, Golden Swallow (1968), Lady Hermit (1971), Flirting Scholar (1993), and Crouching Tiger, Hidden Dragon (2000). For the latter, she won a Hong Kong Film Award for Best Supporting Actress.

In addition to her Chinese-language works, Cheng also appeared in English-language productions, including Street Fighter: The Legend of Chun-Li (2009), Lifting (2014), Meditation Park (2017) and Mulan (2020). In television, she appeared in the Wong Fei Hung Series (1996), Young Hero Fong Sai Yuk (1999), Legendary Fighter: Yang's Heroine (2001), Book and Sword, Gratitude and Revenge (2002), Chinese Paladin (2004), Li Wei Resigns from Office (2005), The Patriot Yue Fei (2012), and the reality show Divas Hit the Road (2014), among others.

Cheng died in the San Francisco Bay Area on 17 July 2024, at the age of 78. She was posthumously awarded the Lifetime Achievement Award at the 61st Golden Horse Awards.

== Career ==
Cheng was born Jiang Pei-pei in Shanghai, with her ancestral home in Shaoxing, Zhejiang. She was the eldest of four siblings, with a brother and two sisters. Her father, Jiang Xuecheng, was a Kuomintang member who worked for the Shanghai Municipal Police in Shanghai International Settlement. After World War II, Jiang established China’s first ink factory. In 1952, when Cheng was 6, her father was labeled a counter-revolutionary and sent to a labor camp in Inner Mongolia; she never saw him again and he died in 1963 without his family knowing. Cheng's mother, who was initially her father's secretary and later his concubine, decided to change the children’s surname to her own to protect them from their father's political consequences.

Cheng attended World Elementary School in Shanghai, where she was a schoolmate of future movie stars Grace Chang and Chen Hou. She went to the Shanghai No. 3 Girls' High School, where she was a schoolmate of Lydia Shum. Cheng studied ballet for six years in Shanghai. In the mid-1950s, Cheng's mother and siblings moved to Hong Kong, leaving Cheng in the care of a nanny in Shanghai before the nanny also left. Cheng lived independently for several years and moved to Hong Kong in 1960, during her second year of junior high, to reunite with her family. In 1963, she was admitted to the training programme at Shaw Brothers Studio, after which she joined the studio and made her film debut in The Lotus Lamp (1965), playing the male scholar Liu Yanchang opposite Lin Dai. Cheng followed this with her first female lead role in the Taiwanese drama film Lovers' Rock (1964).

Due to her Mandarin skills and dance background, she quickly worked her way up in the Hong Kong film industry at a time when the Mandarin-language productions commanded higher budgets and wider distribution than Cantonese works. Cheng gained fame for starring in the Hong Kong wuxia film Come Drink with Me (1966), directed by King Hu. Set during the Ming Dynasty, it stars Cheng as Golden Swallow, a skilled swordswoman on a mission to rescue her brother. Cheng continued to play expert swordswomen in a number of films throughout the 1960s.

In 1970, at the peak of her career, Cheng married and subsequently retired from acting, moving to the United States for her husband's business endeavors. She attended business school at the University of California, Irvine and also taught Chinese dance. In the 1980s, Cheng founded a television production company in the United States and traveled across Hawaii and Northern California at her own expense to produce a documentary series about Chinese Americans. Both Cheng's TV business and her marriage failed around the same time. In 1987, she divorced from her husband but continued to live with him for two years. In 1989, her company declared bankruptcy, and Cheng moved out of their house.

With the comedy Flirting Scholar (1993), Cheng successfully returned to acting in the 1990s Hong Kong. In 2000, she returned to international attention with her role as Jade Fox in Crouching Tiger, Hidden Dragon, directed by Ang Lee, whom Cheng had befriended in the 90s when she was host of KSCI's Mandarin talk show, Pei-Pei's Time.

Into the 21st century, she became active across Greater China with Chinese TV dramas such as Young Justice Bao (2000), Chinese Paladin (2004), and The Patriot Yue Fei (2012), as well as Singaporean TV dramas Spring of Life (2002) and Women of Times (2006). She gained new popularity among the younger generation with the first season of Chinese reality show Divas Hit the Road (2014). Her notable international credits included the action film Street Fighter: The Legend of Chun-Li (2009), the British drama Lilting (2014), the Canadian drama Meditation Park (2017), and her last film, Disney’s live-action remake of Mulan (2020).

Upon receiving an award in recognition of her acting career in Hong Kong in 2015, Cheng reflected on her acting career as follows: "I always remember that I represent the Hong Kong people. So no matter where I am in the world, I will always identify myself as a Hong Kong actress and maintain the professionalism that a Hong Kong actress should have."

== Personal life and death ==
Cheng was Buddhist. She was fluent in Shanghainese, Cantonese, Mandarin, and English.

In 1964, while filming Come Drink with Me, she fell in love with Chan Hung-lit, who played the villain Jade-Faced Tiger. The two often quarreled over Chan‘s infidelity and Cheng eventually left him for Yueh Hua, the leading actor in Come Drink with Me. Their relationship lasted five years until Cheng's friend Yi Shu, then an entertainment reporter, got involved; Cheng left the love triangle and moved to the United States after marriage. When Yi Shu discovered Cheng's letter to Yueh from the US, she became so furious that she cut up Yueh's clothes and stabbed a knife into his bed. Yi Shu also made the letter public through newspapers, which put Cheng's marriage in jeopardy and made Yueh end his own relationship with Yi Shu.

In 1970, Cheng married Taiwanese businessman Yuan Wen-Tung, whose father was the agent for Shaw Brothers in Taiwan. The couple met when Shaw Brothers' film Lover's Rock was being shot in Taiwan; Cheng's mother lost money playing mahjong at the Yuan family's home, and Cheng was sent to deliver the money to Yuan's mother, where Cheng first met Yuan. After their marriage, they moved to the United States. Considering Yuan was the only son in his family, Cheng felt obligated to bear a son for him. She experienced eight pregnancies and four miscarriages and had four children until a son was born. In 1987, with an alimony of $100,000, she divorced quietly without informing her children and continued to live with Yuan for two years before moving out.

Cheng's son Harry Yuan is a host on National Geographic, and her daughters Jennifer, Marsha, and Eugenia Yuan are all actresses.

In 2019, Cheng was diagnosed with corticobasal degeneration, but chose to keep the diagnosis private and spend her remaining time with her children and grandchildren. She died in the San Francisco Bay Area on 17 July 2024, at the age of 78. She was posthumously awarded the Lifetime Achievement Award at the 61st Golden Horse Awards.

== Filmography ==
=== Films ===
Year	Title	Role	Notes
1964	Lovers' Rock (情人石)	Lin Qiuzi	
1964	The Last Woman of Shang (妲己)	Dancing girl	
1965	The Lotus Lamp (寶蓮燈)	Liu Yanchang	
1965	Song of Orchid Island (蘭嶼之歌)	Ya Lan	
1966	Come Drink with Me (大醉俠)	Golden Swallow	
1966	The Joy of Spring (歡樂青春)		
1966	Princess Iron Fan (鐵扇公主)	White Bone Demoness	
1967	Blue Skies (艷陽天)	Chen Yun	
1967	The Dragon Creek (龍虎溝)	Guo Er-niu	
1967	Hong Kong Nocturne (香江花月夜)	Chia Chuan-chuan	
1967	Operation Lipstick (1967) (諜網嬌娃)		
1967	The Thundering Sword (神劍震江湖)	So Jiau-jiau	
1968	Golden Swallow (金燕子)	Golden Swallow	
1968	The Jade Raksha (玉羅剎)	Leng Qiuhan	
1968	That Fiery Girl (紅辣椒)	Pearl	
1969	Dragon Swamp (毒龍潭)	Qing-er/Fan Ying	
1969	The Flying Dagger (飛刀手)	Yu Ying	
1969	The Golden Sword (龍門金劍)	Ngai Jin-feng	
1969	Raw Courage (虎膽)	Shangguan Xiuyi	
1970	Brothers Five (五虎屠龍)	Yen Hsing-kung	
1970	Lady of Steel (荒江女俠)	Fang Ying-qi	
1971	The Lady Hermit (鍾馗娘子)	Leng Yu-shuang	
1971	The Shadow Whip (影子神鞭)	Yang Kaiyun	
1971	The Patriotic Heroine (拼命娘子)		
1972	The Yellow Muffler (玉女嬉春)	Singer	
1973	Attack of the Kung Fu Girls (鐵娃)	Siu Ying	
1974	Whiplash (虎辮子)	Hu Pien-tze	
1982	Lunatic Frog Women (烈日女娃人)		
1983	All the King's Men (天下第一)		
1988	Painted Faces (七小福)	Ching	
1993	Flirting Scholar (唐伯虎點秋香)	Madame Wah	
1993	Kidnap of Wong Chak Fai (綁架黃七輝)	Kung Tse-sam	
1994	From Zero to Hero (亂世超人)		
1994	The Gods Must Be Funny in China (非洲超人)	Aunty	
1994	Kung Fu Mistress (神鳳苗翠琴)		
1994	Lover's Lover (情人的情人)		
1994	Wing Chun (詠春)	Ng Mui	Cameo
1996	How to Meet the Lucky Stars (運財五福星)	Chu Ba	
1998	The Spirit of the Dragon (老鼠龍之猛龍過港)	Yun Gee	
1999	Four Chefs and a Feast (四個廚師一圍菜)		Cameo
1999	A Man Called Hero (中華英雄)	Hero's mother	Cameo
1999	The Truth About Jane and Sam (真心話)	Sam's mother	
2000	Fist Power (生死拳速)	Brian's mother	
2000	Crouching Tiger, Hidden Dragon (臥虎藏龍)	Jade Fox	Hong Kong Film Award for Best Supporting Actress
2000	Lavender (薰衣草)	Madame Tung	Cameo
2001	Shadow Mask (武神黑俠)	Red Goddess	a.k.a. The Legend of Black Mask
2002	Flying Dragon, Leaping Tiger (龍騰虎躍)	Liu Ruyan	also producer
2002	Naked Weapon (赤裸特工)	Faye Ching	
2004	Sex and the Beauties (性感都市)	Mona	
2004	The Miracle Box (天作之盒)	Joanna's mother	
2005	Insuperable Kid (無敵小子霍元甲)	Aunt San	
2005	House of Harmony	Amah	
2007	They Wait	Aunt Mei	
2007	Special Boys (功夫好男兒)	Aunt Lan	
2007	Shanghai Baby	Conny	
2007	The Counting House (藏)	Lia	
2008	Kung Fu Killer	Myling	
2008	Love Under the Sign of the Dragon	Tham	
2009	Basic Love (愛情故事)	Ling's grandmother	
2009	Street Fighter: The Legend of Chun-Li	Zhilan	
2009	Blood Ties (還魂)	Madam Lee	
2009	Taishan Kung Fu (泰山功夫)		
2010	Flirting Scholar 2 (唐伯虎點秋香2之四大才子)	Madame Wah	
2010	Here Comes Fortune (財神到)		
2011	Coming Back (回馬槍)		
2011	Legendary Amazons (楊門女將之軍令如山)	She Saihua	
2011	Let Love Come Back (讓愛回家)		
2011	Shanghai Hotel		
2011	Double Bed Treaty (雙人床條約)		
2011	Speed Angels (極速天使)	Auntie Fen	
2011	My Wedding and Other Secrets	Mrs. Chu	
2012	Imperial Bodyguard (御前侍衛)		
2012	Give Me Five (五行攻略)		
2014	Lilting	Junn	
2014	The Scroll of Wing Chun White Crane (永春白鹤拳之擎天画卷)		
2014	The Eyes of Dawn (黎明之眼)		
2014	Streets of Macao		
2014	The Bat Night		
2015	Bright Wedding(璀璨的婚禮)		
2015	Lost in Wrestling		
2016	Good Take Too		
2016	Goldstone	Mrs Lao	
2017	Love Of Hope(讓愛活下去)		
2017	Meditation Park	Maria Wang	
2019	Flirting Scholar from the Future		
2020	Mulan	The Matchmaker	Final film role

=== Television ===
Year	Title	Role	Notes
1980	Chivalrous Shadow, Fragrant Footprints (俠影香蹤)	Golden Swallow	
1984	The Legend Continues (霍東閣)	Chan Shi-chiu	
1996	Wong Fei Hung Series: The Final Victory (黃飛鴻之辛亥革命)	Beggar So	
1997	The Pride of Chaozhou (我來自潮州)	Poon Yuk-lin	
1998	Master Ma (馬永貞之爭霸上海灘)	Ma Daniang	
1998	Master Ma II (馬永貞之英雄血)	Ma Daniang	
1999	Young Master of Shaolin (少年英雄方世玉)	Ng Mui	
2000	Young Justice Bao (少年包青天)	Bao's mother	
2001	Legendary Fighter: Yang's Heroine (楊門女將—女儿當自強)	She Saihua	
2001	Heroes in Black (我來也)	Feng Pobu's mother	
2002	Book and Sword, Gratitude and Revenge (書劍恩仇錄)	Empress Dowager Chongqing	
2002	Springs of Life (春到人间)	Yun Shuheng	
2004	Chinese Paladin (仙劍奇俠傳)	Granny Jiang	
2004	Water Moon, Hollow Sky (水月洞天)	Long Po	a.k.a. Paradise
2005	Li Wei Resigns from Office (李衛辭官)	Li Wei's mother	
2006	Women of Times (至尊紅顏)	She Huijun	
2006	The Yang Sisters	Honey Yang	
2008	Home with Kids 5 (家有儿女5)		
2010	A Weaver on the Horizon (天涯織女)	Mrs. Fang	
2012	Xuan-Yuan Sword: Scar of Sky (軒轅劍：天之痕)	Granny Ma	
2012	The Patriot Yue Fei (精忠岳飛)	Yue Fei's mother	
2013	Daughter's Return (千金归来)	Mother Rong	
2015	The Lost Tomb	Huo Xian Gu	
2016	Ice Fantasy (幻城)	Feng Tian	

Awards and achievements
Preceded by Carrie Ng for The Kid	Hong Kong Film Awards for Best Supporting Actress; 2000 for Crouching Tiger, Hidden Dragon	Succeeded by Karena Lam for July Rhapsody
