= The Secret of the Magic Gourd (2007 film) =

- Official U.S. home video cover artwork
- Traditional Chinese: 魔法南瓜的秘密
- Simplified Chinese: 宝葫芦的秘密
- Directed by: John Chu; Frankie Chung
- Written by: Zhang Tianyi
- Screenplay by: John Chu; Lam Kee To
- Produced by: Han San Ping; John Chu
- Edited by: Angie Lam
- Music by: Peter Kam
- Production companies: Walt Disney Pictures China; Centro Digital Pictures Limited
- Distributed by: China Film Group Corporation
- Release dates: June 29, 2007 (China); January 27, 2009 (United States)
- Running time: 85 minutes
- Country: China
- Language: Chinese
- Box office: $3.1 million

The Secret of the Magic Gourd (Chinese: 宝葫芦的秘密; also known as The Magic Gourd) is a 2007 Chinese live-action/animated fantasy drama film made by Centro in co-operation with China Movie Co., Ltd and Walt Disney Pictures. It is the second film based on a 1958 novel by Zhang Tianyi after the 1963 Chinese film. The film is all about an 11-year-old lazy boy, Raymond, who learns the meaning of hard-work after a magic gourd, Bailey, grants him anything he wants.

The Secret of the Magic Gourd is Disney's first CGI/animation full-length feature film produced for the mainland Chinese market.

The film was released on January 27, 2009, on DVD in the United States. The English dubbed version of the film features Corbin Bleu as the voice of the Magic Gourd and Drake Johnston as the voice of Raymond, plus Megan Hilty as Ms. Lee. The Secret of the Magic Gourd is also available on Disney+.

== Plot ==
When an inquisitive 11 year old discovers a mythical, magical gourd while fishing, he has no idea of the trouble that lies at the end of his hook. With the ability to grant any and every wish, the Magic Gourd attempts to make all of the boy's dreams come true, but instead succeeds in turning his world upside down.

== Cast ==
Character	Original actor	English voice
The Magic Gourd	Peisi Chen	Corbin Bleu
Miss Liu/Ms. Lee	Gigi Leung	Megan Hilty
Grandma	Meng Qian	Takayo Fischer
Wang Bao/Raymond	Qilong Zhu	Drake Johnston
Yao Jun/John	Lao Yijia	Aaron Drozin
Su Mingfeng/Susie	Wei Lai	Grace Fulton
Yang Shuan/Dan	Zheng Jiahao	Josh Reaves
Zheng Xiaodeng/Sean	Wang Jiakun	Jeremy Shada
Sister	Hu Qianlin	unknown
Mother	He Qing	unknown
Father	Guo Kaimin	Stephen Stanton
Swimming Coach	Long De	unknown

=== Additional voices ===
- Original: Zhu Gi Long, Zheng Jia Hao, Wang Jia Kun, Lao Yi Jia, Guo Kai Min, He Qing, Meng Qing, Hu Qian, Hu Qian Lin, Long De, Zhang Yao Dong, Tang Wen Ting, Wei Ji Hao, Chen Jun Jie, Jin Li Lin, Zhou Min Min, Huang Cun Bao, Li Hao Ban, Lin Bai Ling, Pan Jia Wen, Xia Da Zi, Miao Ling, Shen Ling, Cai Sha Li, Chai Ge Fei, Wang Qing Wen, Wang Sang Qi, Sun Tian Qi, Jia Cheng, Lu Yi Han, Zhang Ruo Lin, Guan Min, Fang Li Peng, Tong Hui Lin, Zhu Yi Ting, Mo Yan Nan, Liu Jing Ni, Gu Kai Ping, Wang Hang Yang, Zhang Tian En, Yu Feng, Zhang Yan Qin, Yang Ni, Li Hao, Wang Yi, Wang Chao, Yang Yang, Zhang Yi Men, Huang Meng, Sun Bang Bang, Zhao Ren Jie
- English: Corey Burton, Blake Dempsey, Tiffany Espensen, Harrison Fahn, Keith Ferguson, Isabelle Fuhrman, Cheryl Sklarr, Audrey Wasilewski

== Production ==
The film was revealed in December 2005 as a co-production between Disney's theatrical unit Buena Vista International, Centro Digital Pictures and China Film Group, the film began shooting in China on October 29, 2005.

== Reception ==
Common Sense Media gave the film 3 out of 5 stars and the disclaimer: "Magical tale teaches moral lesson."
