= Fung Wan =

Hong Kong comic series

- Cloud (left) and Wind

風雲 Wind and Cloud
- Genre: Wuxia
- Author: Ma Wing-shing
- Illustrator: Ma Wing-shing
- Publisher: Jonesky (Hong Kong)
- English publisher: ComicsOne (United States)
- Original run: 1989–2015
- Volumes: 18

Fung Wan (風雲) or Feng Yun, literally Wind and Cloud, is a Hong Kong wuxia manhua series by Ma Wing-shing. It was first published in 1989 by Ma's company Jonesky Publishing with the help of his assistant Siu Kit. Before the third volume was released, the manhua was known as Fung Wan until the two protagonists – Wind and Cloud – became secondary characters and the manhua was renamed Tin Ha (天下) or Tian Xia. The manhua has spawned numerous adaptations, most notably the Hong Kong films The Storm Riders (1998) and The Storm Warriors (2009), the video game Fung Wan Online, and the Chinese–Taiwanese television series Wind and Cloud (2002) and Wind and Cloud II (2005).

== Plot ==
The series is set in the wulin (martial artists' community) of 15th- or 16th-century China during the Ming dynasty. The two protagonists – Nie Feng (Wind) and Bu Jingyun (Cloud) – learn martial arts in their early years and mature through their experiences to become legends in the wulin. As the series progresses, more characters are introduced in new story arcs.

=== Part 1 ===
The first story arc is about the origins of Nie Feng and Bu Jingyun. When they are still boys, they are taken into the martial arts clan Tianxiahui (Under Heaven Society) by its chief, Xiongba (Lord Conqueror), who trains them in martial arts for an ulterior motive. Xiongba was once told by Nipusa, a Buddhist prophet, that he will rise to power in the wulin with the help of "Wind and Cloud". When he reaches the pinnacle of his conquests, Nipusa reveals that "Wind and Cloud" are also destined to bring about his downfall, so Xiongba plots to turn Nie Feng and Bu Jingyun against each other. The rest of the story arc follows Nie Feng and Bu Jingyun's adventures after they escape from Tianxiahui. They gradually improve their skills, acquire powerful weapons, befriend other notable wulin figures, and meet their respective romantic partners. In the end, Nie Feng and Bu Jingyun return to confront Xiongba and defeat him, fulfilling the prophecy. After that, they decide to retire from the wulin to lead peaceful lives with their respective lovers.

Juewushen (Lord Godless), a formidable Japanese martial artist, leads his clan to China with the intention of dominating the wulin and ruling China. He captures the Chinese emperor and sends his son, Juexin (Heartless), to impersonate the emperor and pretend to abdicate the throne to him. Nie Feng and Bu Jingyun come out of retirement and collaborate with their wulin allies to stop Juewushen. After his defeat, Juewushen takes the Chinese emperor and other wulin figures hostage and retreats back to Japan. Nie Feng and Bu Jingyun travel to Japan, where they meet Tennō, a Japanese warlord, and join forces with him to counter Juewushen. Juewushen is eventually betrayed and killed by Juexin, who has switched allegiance to Tennō. Upon returning to China, Nie Feng and Bu Jingyun realise that Tennō is secretly plotting to seize the Dragon Bones, the spiritual foundation of China. Nie Feng learns a new but dangerous skill to counter Tennō, and falls into a state of zouhuorumo as a result. Even though they manage to defeat Tennō and the Dragon Bones get destroyed in the process, the zouhuorumo Nie Feng now poses a serious threat to the wulin. In the final showdown, Bu Jingyun confronts Nie Feng and knocks him out of his zouhuorumo state, but falls off a cliff during the fight and goes missing.

=== Part 2 ===
Huaikong, a member of the Iron Clan, searches for and finds the missing Bu Jingyun, who is suffering from amnesia and has become a fisherman. With Huaikong's help, Bu Jingyun gradually regains his memory, returns to the wulin, and reunites with Nie Feng, who has since recovered from his zouhuorumo state.

Around this time, a mysterious martial arts clan known as Tianmen (Heaven's Gate) has emerged in the wulin and attracted many top-tier fighters to join them. The clan's leader, Dishitian, is actually the Qin dynasty alchemist Xu Fu, who has become immortal and spent the past centuries mastering all kinds of martial arts, making himself nearly invincible. He has a grand plan to gather the seven warriors who possess the seven most powerful weapons in the wulin – including Nie Feng and Bu Jingyun – to join him in his quest to slay a dragon and obtain a mystical orb, which can boost one's neigong by several times when consumed.

The quest is successful but the orb shatters into seven pieces. Out of greed, Dishitian consumes more pieces than his body can take, and suffers serious internal injuries. His treacherous servant, Duan Lang, seizes the opportunity to kill him and absorb his neigong, morphing into a demonic creature. Replacing Dishitian as the greatest threat to the wulin, Duan Lang kills Nie Feng and Bu Jingyun's loved ones to force them to fight him. Although Nie Feng and Bu Jingyun team up and manage to destroy Duan Lang, they end up being frozen in ice and are never seen in the wulin again for many years.

=== Part 3 ===
Many years have passed since Nie Feng and Bu Jingyun's battle against Duan Lang. Order and stability have been restored in the wulin while a new generation of heroes make their debut. They include Nie Feng and Bu Jingyun's respective sons, Yifeng and Bu Tian, as well as Duan Lang's twin sons, Shenfeng and Lanwu. In the meantime, Nie Feng and Bu Jingyun are freed from their icy prison and return to the wulin to face an old foe, Juexin (Heartless), as well as other enemies.

== Publication ==
The English version of the manhua was published by the now-defunct ComicsOne.

- Storm Riders Vol.01: ISBN 1-58899-142-3
- Storm Riders Vol.02: ISBN 1-58899-143-1
- Storm Riders Vol.03: ISBN 1-58899-144-X
- Storm Riders Vol.04: ISBN 1-58899-145-8
- Storm Riders Vol.05: ISBN 1-58899-146-6
- Storm Riders Vol.06: ISBN 1-58899-156-3
- Storm Riders Vol.07: ISBN 1-58899-157-1
- Storm Riders Vol.08: ISBN 1-58899-246-2
- Storm Riders Vol.09: ISBN 1-58899-159-8
- Storm Riders Vol.10: ISBN 1-58899-160-1
- Storm Riders Vol.11: ISBN 1-58899-161-X
- Storm Riders Vol.12: ISBN 1-58899-162-8
- Storm Riders II: Invading Sun Vol.1: ISBN 1-58899-359-0
- Storm Riders II: Invading Sun Vol.2: ISBN 1-58899-360-4
- Storm Riders II: Invading Sun Vol.3: ISBN 1-58899-361-2
- Storm Riders II: Invading Sun Vol.4: ISBN 1-58899-362-0
- Storm Riders II: Invading Sun Vol.5: ISBN 1-58899-352-3
- Storm Riders II: Invading Sun Vol.6: ISBN 1-58899-168-7

== Spin-offs ==
Shenwuji is a spin-off of Fung Wan, following the stories of the descendants of Wind and Cloud. It is also written by Ma Wing-shing and has received mixed reviews.

== Adaptations ==
=== Films ===
- The Storm Riders is a 1998 Hong Kong film starring Ekin Cheng as Wind and Aaron Kwok as Cloud.
- The Storm Warriors is a 2009 sequel to The Storm Riders. Ekin Cheng and Aaron Kwok reprise their roles as Wind and Cloud respectively.
- Storm Rider Clash of the Evils is a 2008 Hong Kong animated feature film by Puzzle Animation Studio. Richie Ren and Nicholas Tse provided the Mandarin voices for Wind and Cloud respectively, while Hins Cheung and Raymond Lam provided the Cantonese voices.

=== Television series ===
- Wind and Cloud is a 2002 Chinese–Taiwanese television series starring Peter Ho as Cloud and Vincent Zhao as Wind.
- Wind and Cloud 2 is a 2005 Chinese–Taiwanese television series marketed as a sequel to Wind and Cloud (2002) even though it was produced by a different team and had a completely new cast except for Peter Ho and Vincent Zhao, who reprised their roles as Cloud and Wind respectively.

=== Animated series ===
- Nirvana of Storm Rider, produced by Penguin Pictures and animated by Blue Arc Animation, co-directed by Li Chenghong and Xu Feng, with Ma Rongcheng serving as the head writer, premiered on Tencent Video in May 2024, consisting of 30 episodes

=== Video games ===
- Fung Wan Reborn is a MMORPG based on the series.

== Postage stamps ==
- Hong Kong Post issued a set of six stamps and two stamp sheetlets on October 29, 2020

== See also ==
- Ma Wing-shing
- Chinese Hero: Tales of the Blood Sword
