= Jonesky =

Hong Kong publishing company

Jonesky Limited 天下出版有限公司
- Industry: Comics
- Founded: 1989
- Founder: Ma Wing Shing
- Headquarters: Hong Kong
- Website: jonesky.com.hk

Jonesky
- Chinese: 天下出版有限公司
- Literal meaning: Tianxia Publishing Limited
Transcriptions
Standard Mandarin
- Hanyu Pinyin: Tiānxià Chūbǎn Yǒuxiàn Gōngsī
- Bopomofo: ㄊㄧㄢ ㄒㄧㄚˋ ㄔㄨ ㄅㄢˇ ㄧㄡˇ ㄒㄧㄢˋ ㄍㄨㄥ ㄙ
- Gwoyeu Romatzyh: Tianshiah Chubaan Yeoushiann Gongsy
- Wade–Giles: T'ien^{1}hsia^{4} Ch'u^{1}pan^{3} Yu^{3}hsien^{4} Kung^{1}ssu^{1}
Yue: Cantonese
- Yale Romanization: Tīnhah Chēutbáan Yáuhhaahn Gūngsī
- Jyutping: Tin^{1}haa^{6} Ceot^{1}baan^{2} Jau^{5}haan^{6} Gung^{1}si^{1}

Jonesky Limited (Chinese: 天下出版有限公司; pinyin: Tiānxià Chūbǎn Yǒuxiàn Gōngsī) is a Hong Kong publisher of domestic Chinese manhua and translated, imported comics from Japan. Several of their titles have been translated and released in English. It was founded in 1989 by comics creator Ma Wing Shing, who remains its CEO, and in recent years its products have branched out to include collectible merchandise from its series and Comics Fans, a magazine aimed at girls.

== Selected works ==
Domestic Chinese-language titles published by Jonesky include:

- Ma Wing Shing: Fung Wan, Black Leopard (黑豹), Ying Xiong Wu Lei
- Shiu Wan: My Prince (我的王子殿下), Mushroom College (蘑菇學園)
- Leung Wai Ka: Heaven Sword And Dragon Sabre (倚天屠龍記)
- Li Chi-Tak: The Stone God (石神)

Examples of imported Japanese titled translated and distributed by Jonesky include:

- Sailor Moon
- One Piece
- Slam Dunk
- Vagabond
- Cardcaptor Sakura
- Kare Kano
- Saiyuki Reload
- Hayate the Combat Butler
- Shugo Chara!
- Over Rev!
