= Chinese Hero: Tales of the Blood Sword =

Manhua series by Ma Wing-shing

- Cover of Chinese Hero: Tales of the Blood Sword vol. 1 (1980), art by Ma Wing-shing

中華英雄 Zung1 Waa4 Jing1 Hung4 (Cantonese) Zhōnghuá Yīngxíong (Mandarin)
- Genre: Wuxia
- Author: Ma Wing-shing
- Publisher: Jademan, Culturecom Holdings (Hong Kong)
- English publisher: HK: Jademan; US: DrMaster
- Magazine: Golden Daily
- Original run: 1980–1995
- Collected volumes: 8

Chinese Hero: Tales of the Blood Sword
- Traditional Chinese: 中華英雄
- Simplified Chinese: 中华英雄
- Literal meaning: Chinese Hero
Transcriptions
Standard Mandarin
- Hanyu Pinyin: Zhōnghuá Yīngxíong
Yue: Cantonese
- Jyutping: Zung1 Waa4 Jing1 Hung4

Chinese Hero: Tales of the Blood Sword is a wuxia manhua series created by Hong Kong artist Ma Wing-shing. It is also referred to as Blood Sword, Blood Sword Dynasty, A Chinese Hero: Tales of the Blood Sword, and A Man Called Hero.

It was published in English by Jademan Comics in Hong Kong, and by DrMaster in the United States.

== Background ==
The artwork and drawing style of Chinese Hero is responsible for the modern characteristics of manhua. It was a breakthrough in terms of using high levels of details, realistic style, clear-cut action scenes, and skillful use of color in combination with an engrossing plot. The manhua turned the artist Ma Wing-shing from rags to riches. Ma became the most popular manhua artist in Hong Kong at that time. The story was an immediate hit, selling 45,000 copies when first released. At the peak of its popularity, sales hit peaks of 200,000 copies. In January 1990 its circulation was 180,000. That month Monica Ko of the South China Morning Post described it as "One of the best sellers" of Jademan. It is famous for having characters that are physically imperfect, such as missing an eye or limb for the sake of expressing the realism that real life people are not perfect.

== Plot ==
The plot is set in China and America in the early 20th century. Hero Hua (Note: Hua Yingxiong: Hero Hua (DrMaster) / Wah Ying-hung, "Hero" (Jademan): traditional Chinese: 華英雄; simplified Chinese: 华英雄; Jyutping: waa4 jing1 hung4; pinyin: Huá Yīngxióng; lit. 'Chinese Hero') is a young swordsman whose family was murdered by a foreign-backed tycoon coveting his family heirloom, the Blood Sword. After taking revenge on the foreigners who killed his family, Hero flees to America to start a new but embittered life as a miner. Throughout his adventures in America, he meets new friends such as Guipu (Ghost Servant) and Jinlong (Gold Dragon), and learns new skills and becomes a powerful swordsman. However, he also runs into trouble with the ruthless Black Dragon Gang and a Japanese ninja group. As he gets caught up in the power struggles, Hero finds himself up against gang wars, murder, treachery, and racial discrimination in America.

Following a fight against the Black Dragon Gang and the ninjas, Hero and his wife Chen Jieyu (Note: Chen Jieyu: Chan Kit-yue (Jademan): 陳潔瑜; 陈洁瑜; can4 git3 jyu4; Chén Jiéyú) decide to leave America with their newborn twins and return to China. During the voyage, Jieyu is murdered by Black Dragon gangsters while the twins are thrown overboard. In anger, Hero heads back to America to confront the Black Dragon Gang. He fails in his attempt to kill the gang leader but is saved by an elderly swordsman, Sword Saint. Before his death, Sword Saint entrusts the inn in Chinatown to Hero's care and makes him promise never to get involved in any conflict again.

Several years later, a mysterious teenager visits the inn one day and he turns out to be Hero's son, Sword Hua (Note: Hua Jianxiong: Sword Hua (DrMaster) / Wah Kim-hung (Jademan): 華劍雄; 华剑雄; waa4 gim3 hung4; Huá Jiànxióng), who has survived and grown up in China. Hero also learns from a fortune teller that he is destined to lead a life of loneliness because he was born under an inauspicious star so misfortune will befall everyone close to him. In the final showdown, he defeats a Japanese swordsman in a duel on top of the Statue of Liberty.

== Publication history ==
=== Original release ===
Chinese Hero was first published in Golden Daily in 1980 and was a supplement to Wong Yuk-long's Drunken Master. It then later became its own separate manhua. The first issue of the Chinese Hero periodical was published in 1982.

=== Jademan comic releases ===
In 1988, Jademan Comics started publishing Chinese Hero in English under the title The Blood Sword, which was criticised for poor translation. Jademan later published a second series titled Blood Sword Dynasty which followed the adventures of the protagonist Hero's son, Jian, known as Wah Kim-hung in the Jademan translation. Ma Wing-shing left Jademan by 1989.

The Chinese manhua Blood Sword Dynasty is part of the same series as Chinese Hero and not a spin-off. Despite its popularity, the series was canceled in 1995.

=== DrMaster releases ===
In October 2006, publishers DrMaster announced that they were planning to release a new English translation of Chinese Hero. These new releases included an all new English translation as well as new digital re-coloration.

The re-release started from the beginning of the second series, with the plot alteration of Hero's parents being murdered by a "Northern Mantis kung fu" group instead of Westerners in the original version, due to the first series use of anti-Western sentiments.

The reprints at the point of volume 8 do not extend beyond the original plot of the original Jademan comics.

==== Collections ====
The collections are:

- Chinese Hero:
  - Tales of the Blood Sword volume 1 (April 2007, 260 pages, ISBN 1-59796-041-1)
  - Tales of the Blood Sword volume 2 (September 2007, 260 pages, ISBN 1-59796-116-7)
  - Tales of the Blood Sword volume 3 (August 2007, 280 pages, ISBN 1-59796-117-5)
  - Tales of the Blood Sword volume 4 (November 2007, 280 pages, ISBN 1-59796-118-3)
  - Tales of the Blood Sword volume 5 (February 2008, 240 pages, ISBN 1-59796-124-8)
  - Tales of the Blood Sword volume 6 (May 2008, 224 pages, ISBN 1-59796-131-0)
  - Tales of the Blood Sword volume 7 (August 2008, 224 pages, ISBN 1-59796-148-5)
  - Tales of the Blood Sword volume 8 (November 2008, 224 pages, ISBN 1-59796-149-3)

== Reception ==
A. E. Sparrow of IGN reviewed the DrMaster translations, which he overall gave a negative reception to, citing difficulty in following the storyline. He ranked Volume 4 a 6.9 ("Okay"), and Volume 5 a 2.7 ("Painful").

== Adaptations ==
=== Film ===
Ekin Cheng starred in a 1999 Hong Kong film titled A Man Called Hero, directed by Andrew Lau. Although the plot differed largely from the original story, the film was popular and became the highest grossing Hong Kong film up to that time.

=== Television ===
In 1990, Hong Kong's ATV produced and aired a 25-episode television series based on the manhua. It was titled The Blood Sword and starred Kenny Ho, Law Chung-wah, Veronica Yip, Yeung Chak-lam, Esther Kwan, and Eric Wan. A 20-episode-long prequel, The Blood Sword 2, was released a year later, with most of the cast members in the first season reprising their roles.

In 2005, Taiwanese producer Yang Peipei released a 40-episode television series based on the manhua. It was titled The Legend of Hero and starred Peter Ho, Ady An, Lan Chenglong, Qin Lan, Zheng Guolin, Chen Guanlin, Liu Weihua, Li Li-chun, and Feng Shaofeng in the leading roles.

=== Video game ===
A video game based on the manhua was produced by Acebrock. The game was initially scheduled to be released in both Chinese and English on the PC platform. Although the game shared the same English title as the film, it remained faithful to the original story, as opposed to the changes introduced in the film. As of 2007, Acebrock fell through and the game existed in either scrap or beta form only.
