= Zhang Tianyi =

Chinese writer and children's book author

- 张天翼
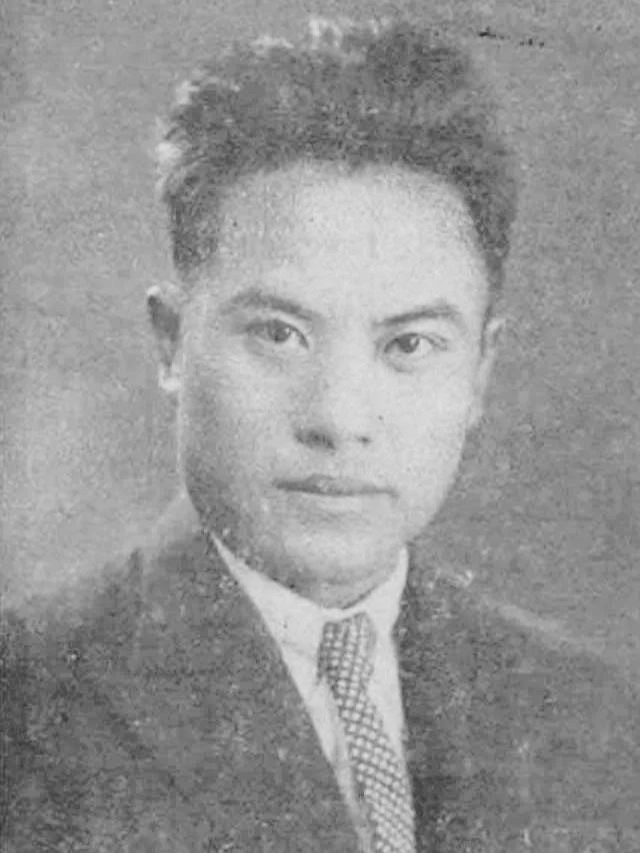
- Born: 26 September 1906; Nanjing, Jiangsu, China
- Died: 28 April 1985 (aged 78); Beijing, China
- Education: Beijing University – 1920s
- Occupation: Writer
- Writing career
- Notable work: The Secret of the Magic Gourd

Chinese name
- Traditional Chinese: 張天翼
- Simplified Chinese: 张天翼
Transcriptions
Standard Mandarin
- Hanyu Pinyin: Zhāng Tiānyì
- Wade–Giles: Chang T'ien-yi

Zhang Tianyi, (real name: Zhang Yuanding; 26 September 1906 – 28 April 1985) was a 20th-century Chinese left-wing writer and children's author, whose novels and short stories achieved acclaim in the 1930s for his satiric wit.

== Biography ==
Zhang was born in Nanjing in 1906. Before the Second Sino-Japanese War, he worked as a teacher, journalist and minor official. His prolific literary career started out in the 1920s. By the early 1930s Zhang had joined both the League of Left-Wing Writers and Mao's Chinese Communist Party. During the war and after the establishment of the People's Republic of China, he continued to write and held various official posts, including the editorship of the literary journal Renmin Wenxue (People's Literature).

His novels include Big Lin and Little Lin, The Kingdom of Golden Ducks, and The Secret of the Magic Gourd.

== Works ==
The hostility of the Chinese Kuomintang regime meant that much of Zhang's writing had to be serialized in underground journals.

These are the first full editions of Zhang Tianyi's works:

=== Stories and shorter works ===
- "A Three-and-a-Half Days' Dream" (1929)
- "Mr. Jing Ye" (1930)
- "Revenge" (1930 to 1931)
- "The Sorrows of Pig Guts" (1931)
- "On the Lack of Vigor in Composition: Its Reasons and its Cure" (1932)
- "A Tale of Writing" (1933)
- "Tips" (1933)
- "A Hyphenated Story" (1934)
- "Smile" (1934)
- "Strange Encounter" (1934)
- "The Bulwark" (1936)
- "Mr. Hua Wei" (1938)
- "Art and Struggle" (1939)
- "The Story of Luo Wenying" (1952)

=== Novels, novellas, and novelettes ===
- A Diary of Hell (1931)
- Big Lin and Little Lin (1932)
- The Cogwheel (1932)
- One Year (1933)
- Changing Paths (1934)
- The Pidgin Warrior (1936)
- In the City (1937)
- Friends-Pioneers (1956)
- The Secret of the Magic Gourd (1958)
- The Kingdom of Golden Ducks (1980)
