= Veronica Yip =

Hong Kong-American actress

- Born: Yip Yuk-hing; February 12, 1967 (age 59); Portuguese Macau
- Citizenship: United States
- Education: Our Lady of the Rosary College
- Occupations: Actress; singer
- Years active: 1985–1996, 2012–2013
- Spouse: Jeffrey Wu (m. 1996)
- Children: 3
- Musical career
- Also known as: Hing-hing (卿卿), Sister Hing (卿姐)
- Origin: Hong Kong, China
- Instruments: Vocals

Chinese name
- Traditional Chinese: 葉玉卿
- Simplified Chinese: 叶玉卿
Transcriptions
Standard Mandarin
- Hanyu Pinyin: Yè Yùqīng
Yue: Cantonese
- Jyutping: yip9 yuk9 hing1

Veronica Yip Yuk Hing (Chinese: 叶玉卿; pinyin: Yè Yùqīng; born February 12, 1967) is a Macau-born American actress and singer known for her roles in Category III films.

== Career ==
=== Film ===
Veronica Yip was born in Portuguese Macau and started her career in participating in the 1985 Miss Asia Pageant and received the 2nd runner-up award. Her career breakthrough was when she starred in adult films which previously were considered taboo for mainstream actresses in the Hong Kong market. Yip has starred in a total of three of these Category III films: Take Me (1991), Pretty Woman (1992) and Hidden Desire (1992). All three films were regarded as commercial successes and paved the way for mainstream actresses such as Loletta Lee and Irene Wan to act in such films.

Aside from these films, Yip has also starred in many critically acclaimed Chinese movies, including Jeffrey Lau's The Eagle Shooting Heroes and Stanley Kwan's Red Rose, White Rose (1994). Yip's ability to escape the soft porn market paved the way for actresses such as Shu Qi and Pauline Chan to do the same.

=== Music ===
Yip had a singing career when she joined Fitto Entertainment, owned by her brother Yip Chi-Ming, before the company was transitioned into Emperor Entertainment Group, releasing seven cantopop and mandopop albums between 1992 and 1995. Yip received three Best New Artist gold awards from 1992 Ultimate Song Chart Awards Presentation, 1992 RTHK Top 10 Gold Songs Awards, and 1992 Jade Solid Gold Best Ten Music Awards Presentation.

== Family ==
In 1998, Yip invested a large sum in her brother's project of building a Disneyland in Hong Kong. However, the project was scrapped along with the budget, causing a fallout between the two. Yip and her brother later reconciled.

Yip met her husband, Chinese-American businessman Jeffrey Wu (胡兆明), when Yip was hired by Premier Entertainment in New York to perform a concert at the Trump Marina in Atlantic City. After marrying Wu in 1996, Yip retired from entertainment and moved to the United States, where Wu runs the Hong Kong Supermarket chain. The couple have a daughter and two sons and currently reside on Long Island. They also have substantial investments in United International Bank, a business jet trading company, and various business-use real estate projects.

== Political stance ==
In November 2020, Yip mentioned that she was a Republican supporter and supported the second term of Donald Trump.
