= Ma Wing-shing =

Hong Kong comic artist and writer (born 1961)

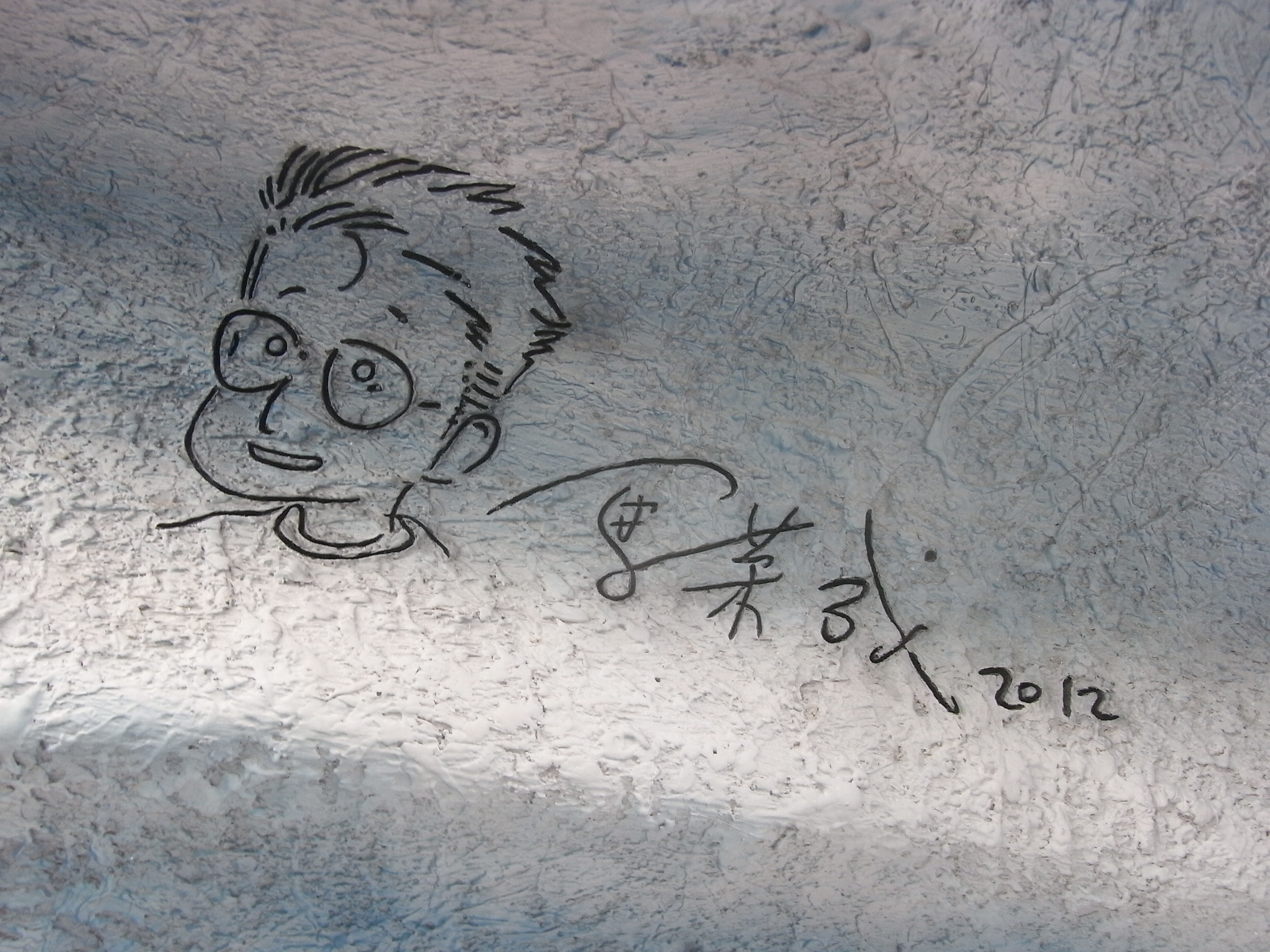
- Born: Ma Wing-shing (馬榮城); 16 January 1961 (age 65) Hong Kong
- Areas: Writer, Artist, Publisher
- Notable works: Fung Wan; Chinese Hero

Ma Wing-shing
- Traditional Chinese: 馬榮成
- Simplified Chinese: 马荣成
Transcriptions
Standard Mandarin
- Hanyu Pinyin: Mǎ Róngchéng
Yue: Cantonese
- Jyutping: Maa5 Wing4-sing4

Ma Wing-shing (birth name)
- Traditional Chinese: 馬榮城
- Simplified Chinese: 马荣城
Transcriptions
Standard Mandarin
- Hanyu Pinyin: Mǎ Róngchéng
Yue: Cantonese
- Jyutping: Maa5 Wing4-sing4

Ma Wing-shing (born 16 January 1961) is a Hong Kong manhua artist, writer and publisher. He is best known for creating the Fung Wan and Chinese Hero series.

== Biography ==
Cover of Hong Kong manhua Fung Wan

Ma quit his studies and became a comic artist in 1976 at the age of 15. He started his career in Hei Po, where he published his first series, Day Dream. His other works included Winds and Clouds in Public Housing, Wily Little One, Little Tough Guy, Great Dictator, Lau-keung the Contractor, The Invisible Weird Guest and Wonder Dog.

In 1977, Hei Po was closed and Ma joined Golden Comics, where he began employing realism in his works, such as The Five Brothers, which caught the attention of others in the industry. He also published The Battle: Before and After in Hong Kong Comic Weekly.

The following year, Ma attended a one-year course at the Hong Kong Academy of Fine Arts to improve his drawing skills. He quit Golden Comics and joined Ching Po, where he produced numerous works, including: Evil Experiment, Assault 13, Alien, I Wanna be Woman, Small Luk's Fight at Wudang and the Eve of the Battle, Martial House, Sword and Spear, Destroyer, My Pursuit, Great Stealer 13, Knowing You, Mad Dog, Security Guard, Story of Big-Nose Boy, Hillfire, and Five Affairs.

Veteran Cop and New Drunken Fist were published in 1980 when Ma was working in New Waves. In August, he joined Jademan and began publishing Chinese Hero in Golden Daily.

In 1981, he furthered his studies in fine arts at Des Montagnes Studio and incorporated his newly acquired knowledge into his works. In November, he co-authored Tong Lung with Fung Chi-ming, and this comic succeeded in entering the Japanese market.

In 1982, the Chinese Hero periodical was published and proved to be an immediate great success, laying a solid foundation for Ma's career.

In 1987, Ma co-organized a painting exhibition, Footsteps, with teachers and students of Des Montages Studio.

In 1989, Ma founded the company Jonesky and released his The Two Extremes and held his personal art exhibition.

== Style ==
In Ma's career, his drawings were heavily influenced by the works of Ryoichi Ikegami for his realistic style and attention to details. He usually employs painterly techniques. The artwork and drawing style of Chinese Hero is responsible for the modern day characteristics of manhua.

== Selected works ==
- Chinese Hero
- Black Leopard
- Fung Wan
- The Storm Riders
  - It was published by Jonesky. It began publication in 1988, and ended in 2013. As a farewell celebration, the publisher unveiled action figures at Animation-Comic-Game Hong Kong.
