= Punching bag =

Type of exercise equipment

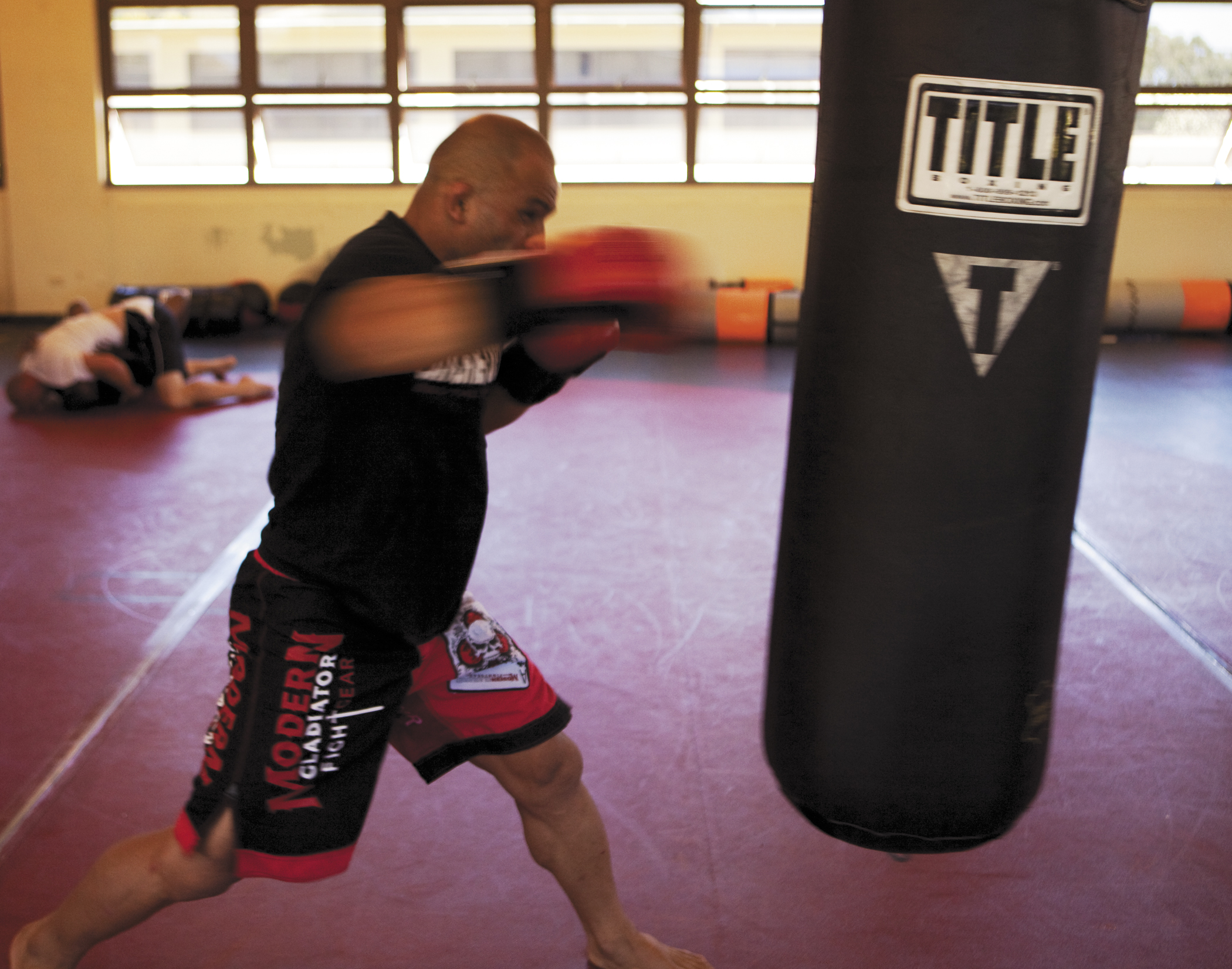
A mixed martial arts fighter "working his hands" on a heavy bag

A punching bag (or British English punchbag) is a sturdy bag designed to be repeatedly punched. A punching bag is usually cylindrical and filled with various materials of suitable hardness.

== History ==
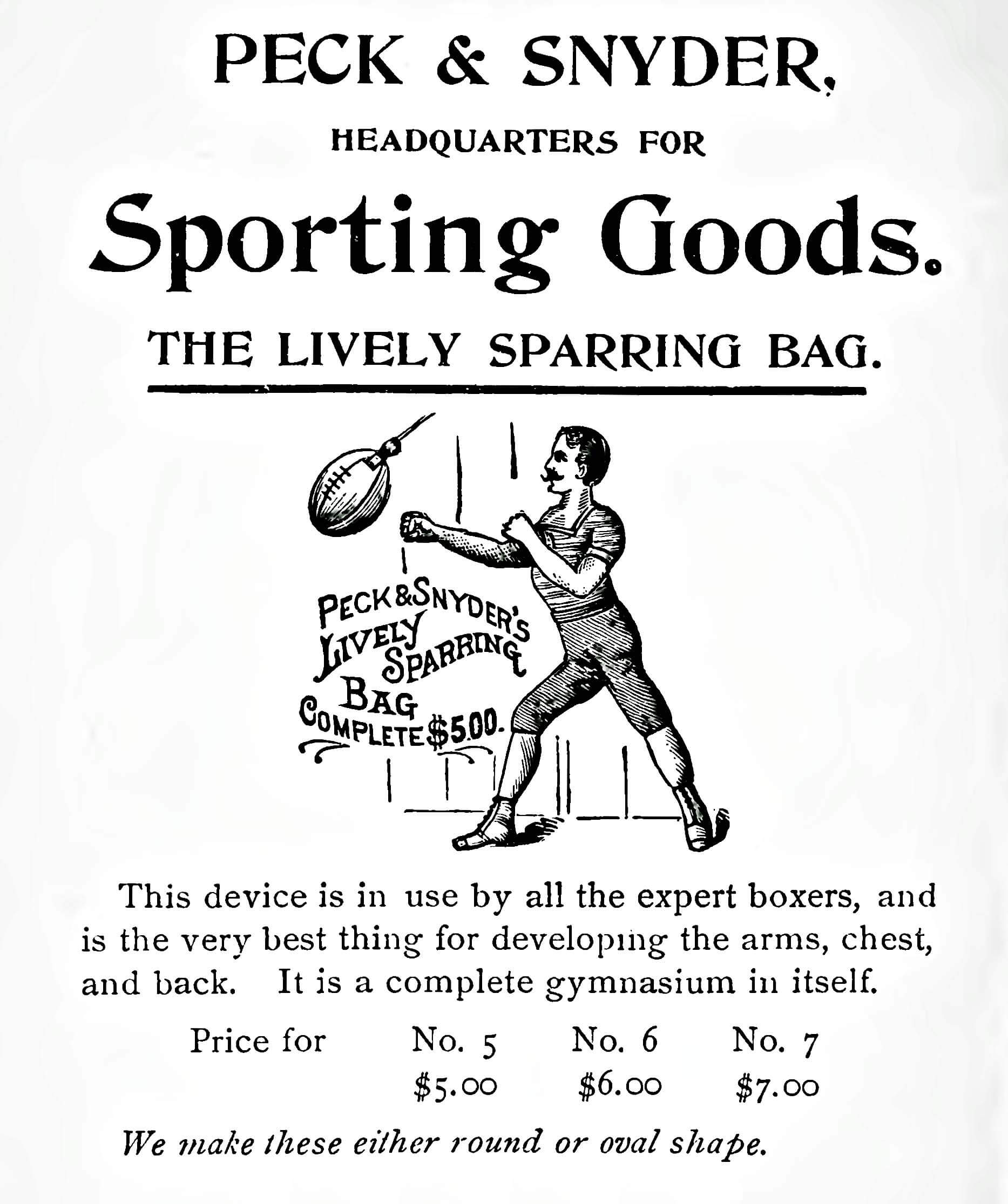
An 1892 advertisement for The Lively Sparring Bag

Punching bags have been used in martial arts and swordplay for the entire written history of military training. Similar apparatus in Asian martial arts include the Okinawan makiwara and the Chinese mook jong, which may have padded striking surfaces attached to them.

In martial arts and combat sports—such as karate, taekwondo, and Muay Thai—"heavy" bags, standing bags, and similar apparatuses have been adapted for practicing kicking and other striking maneuvers in addition to developing punching technique.

== Construction ==
Punching bags are often filled with grains, sand, rags, or other material, and are usually hung from the ceiling or affixed to a stand. Other bags have an internal bladder to allow them to be filled with air or water. The design of a punching bag allows it to take repeated and constant physical abuse without breaking. The bag must also absorb the impact of blows without causing harm to the user. In order to avoid injury, hand protection (boxing gloves, bag gloves, training gloves, hand wraps, etc.) is used during practice.

== Types ==
There are different types of punching bags, with different names based on their size, use and mounting method. Almost all punching bags are covered with either leather or synthetic materials such as vinyl which resist abrasion and mildew. Canvas can also be used as a bag material where there is lower use and humidity.

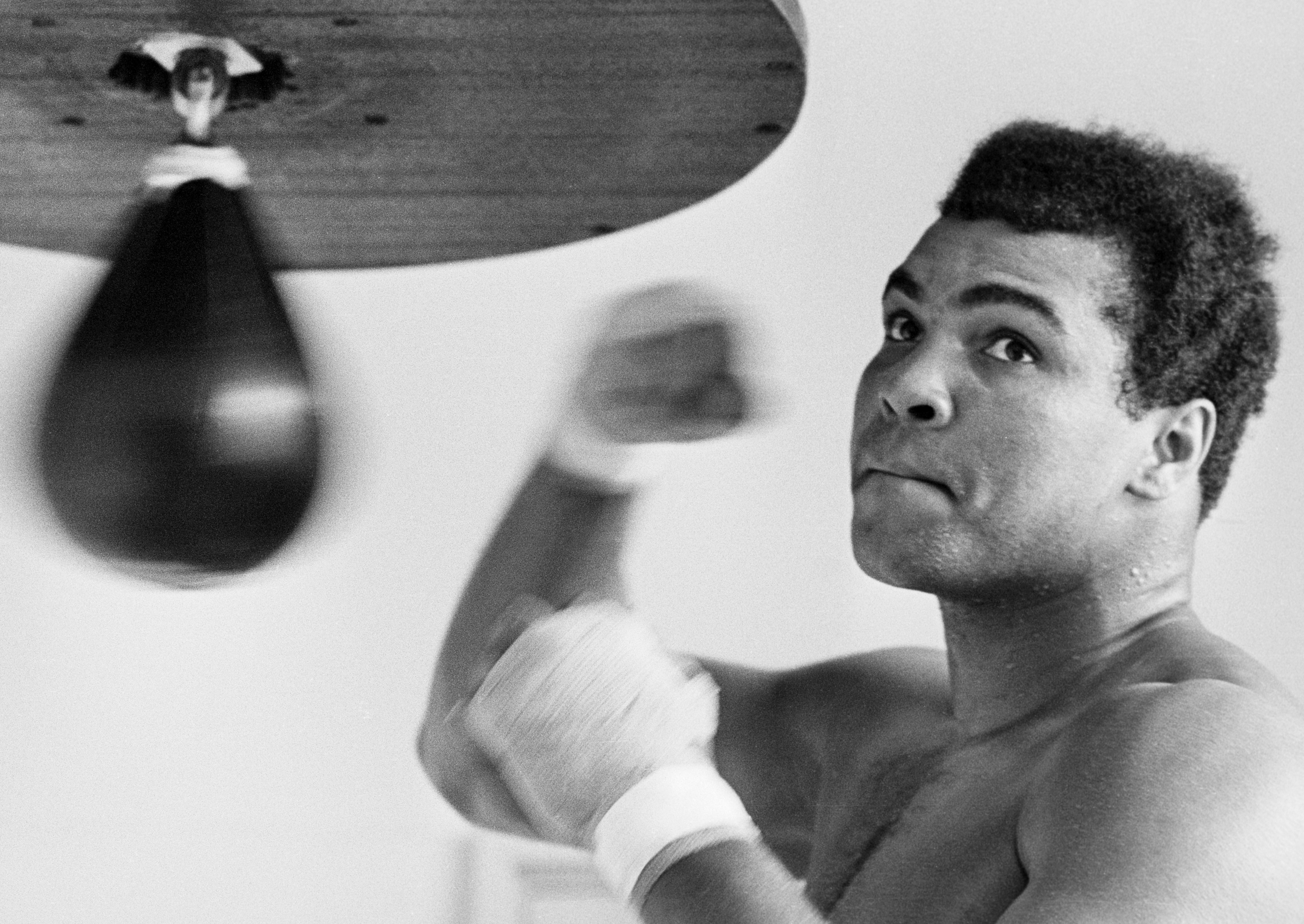
Muhammad Ali training with a speed bag (or speedball)

Gus Keller, 1903

Speed bags or speedballs are small, air-filled bags anchored at the top to a rebound platform parallel to the ground. Speed bags help a fighter learn to keep their hands up, improve hand–eye coordination, and learn to shift weight between feet when punching. They are also known as speedballs or speed ball bags. They are generally filled with air and fitted around a tight PU-based or leather material. They come in various sizes, ranging from the large 33 cm × 25 cm (13.0 in × 9.8 in) and 30 cm × 23 cm (11.8 in × 9.1 in), midsize 28 cm × 20 cm (11.0 in × 7.9 in), 25 cm × 18 cm (9.8 in × 7.1 in) and 23 cm × 15 cm (9.1 in × 5.9 in), to the small 20 cm × 13 cm (7.9 in × 5.1 in), 18 cm × 10 cm (7.1 in × 3.9 in) and 15 cm × 10 cm (5.9 in × 3.9 in). Generally, the larger the bag, the slower it is and the more force is required to keep it going. Large bags are used more for building strength and endurance, while smaller bags allow the training athlete to focus on faster hand speed, timing and coordination. Beginners might view this bag more as a "control bag", not a speed bag, for they will not be able to punch both quickly and repetitively until they gain control over their swinging force and speed.

A boxer normally hits the speed bag from the front with his or her fists, but it is also possible to use fists and elbows to hit the bag from all around it, including the front, back and sides. In this method the user may perform many diverse punching combinations that create improvised rhythmic accents.

Although speed bags are normally hung vertically, they can be hung horizontally on a wall. This was popular during the early twentieth century, specifically the 1920s–1940s era. The same punching skills may be used on the horizontal bag that are used when it hangs vertically. A coordination bag is a type of speed bag that moves unpredictably rather than rhythmically. A portable speed bag offers a simplified installation compared to a traditional speed bag, and can be installed and removed through a tension system that allows for use in any doorway.

Swerve balls/floor-to-ceiling balls/double-end bags are almost the same as speed bags, with the only differences being that the bag' size, shape and material may be different, and that the cable system is attached to both the ceiling and a clip on the floor—when the boxer makes any strike on the ball, it reacts by swinging fast towards them, the object being to swerve, punch, dodge and improve co-ordination. The harder and faster these bags are hit, the more they rebound and react in different motions and angles, thus giving broader practice to the fighter. Double-floor to ceiling balls which allow for training body-head combinations also exist.

Maize bags or slip bags are not punched with great force, but are used in boxing training to improve the athlete's head motion and ability to evade an opponent's punch, their name deriving from the fact that traditionally they are filled with maize.

A heavy bag is a larger, cylindrical bag, usually suspended by chains or ropes and used for practicing powerful body punches, and can be used to toughen hands or any other limb used to hit the bag. Heavy bags are for developing power; technique is best learned on the punch mitts or pads. Some variants of heavy bag are a banana bag used in Muay Thai, which is longer than a regular heavy bag and is used to train low kicks and knee strikes, and a slim line bag that is thinner than a heavy bag.

Freestanding heavy bags are heavy bags mounted on a weighted pedestal rather than being hung from above. The base is typically filled with sand or water to give more stability to the bag and prevent it from moving around. While they serve the same purpose as hanging heavy bags, they can also be toppled over and used for ground-and-pound practice. Other variations on the standard heavy bag include horizontal suspension from both ends to practice uppercut punches, and non-cylindrical shapes. Freestanding reflex bags (freestanding speed bags) also exist.

Uppercut bags began to appear towards the beginning of the 21st century. With so many different variations of bags and training equipment for boxing taking off, the uppercut bag was and is still a common sight in clubs and gyms.

Designed for uppercut practice, jabbing, curl punching and quick bursts of high and low punching practice, it allows the fighter to punch at different lengths, different speeds and different forces compared to the standard average 1.2-meter straight PU (polyurethane) punching bags. Some types of uppercut bags: An angle bag is a variant of uppercut bag used for training hooks and uppercuts; an uppercut horizontal punching tag, teardrop bag, body snatcher/wrecking ball bag or bowling pin bag are used for training knees and uppercuts.

A wall bag is a type of bag that is attached to a wall and can be used for training hooks and uppercuts.

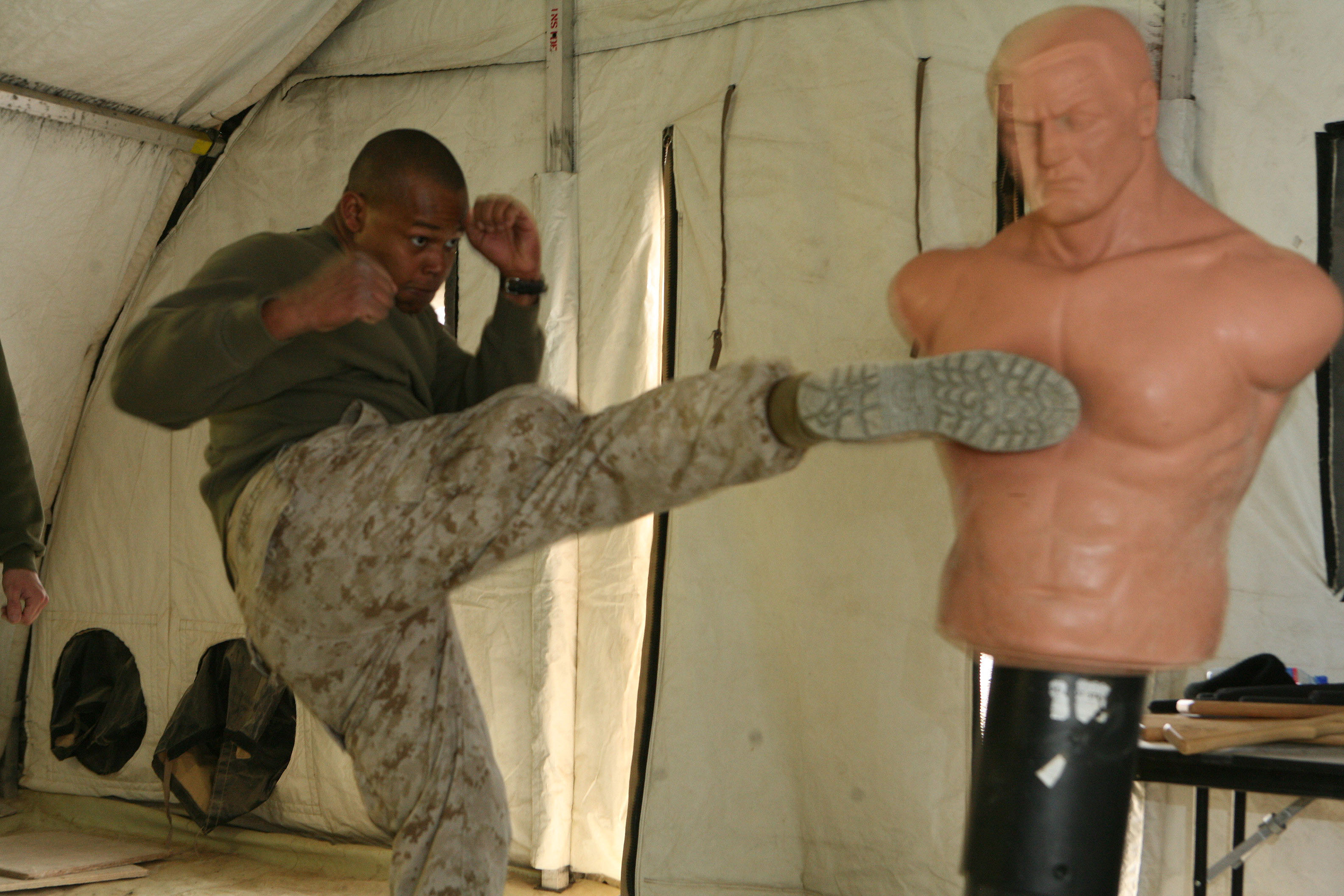
A "body opponent bag" on a pedestal mount

=== Body opponent bag ===
Body-shaped training aids such as the modern "body opponent bag" are made primarily of synthetic materials, and punching bags are sometimes mounted on a weighted pedestal rather than hanging from above. These bags try to simulate a live opponent while providing an opportunity to practice vital area strikes which are generally unsafe to perform on a sparring partner. These are not considered punching bags in the strict sense, but modern versions of apparatus such as the wooden man apparatus of Chinese Wing Chun, the medieval quintain, and target dummies used in modern bayonet training. Large inflatable balloons with weighted bases are another kind of punching bag, often painted with a picture and sold as a children's toy.

== See also ==
- Strength tester machine – some of these machines utilize a punching bag
