= List of films featuring Wing Chun =

This is a list of films and television series which feature Wing Chun, a Chinese martial art style and form, either as the main topic, a plot device, or as demonstration means of the martial art.

Title	Director	Cast	Year	Notes
The Young Dragons	John Woo	Ni Tien, Henry Yu Yung	1974	In the book John Woo: The Films, author Kenneth E. Hall writes, "The Young Dragons bears the strong influence of Chang Cheh (especially his Vengeance), both in its staging (several scenes of corruptly sensual gangsters in lacquered surroundings) and in its choreography (extended wing chun sequences)."
Biho sangjaeng a.k.a. Stranger from Shaolin Alternative titles: Fist of flying tiger, Wing Chun Warriors, A fight between flying tigers, Fei hu xiang zheng	Jo-Myeong Jeon	Cecilia Wong Hang-Sau	1977	A young girl is the sole survivor of an attack on her temple. She learns taekwondo from a local merchant. Taking the name "The Invincible Young-chun", she sets out on a quest for vengeance.
Invincible Shaolin	Chang Cheh		1978	Also known as Unbeatable Dragon, or in German, Das Höllentor der Shaolin.
Warriors Two	Sammo Hung	Sammo Hung, Bryan Leung, Casanova Wong	1978	
The Incredible Kung Fu Master	Joe Cheung	Sammo Hung	1979	Wing Chun is one of two opposing schools
The Prodigal Son	Sammo Hung		1981	Chinese name: Bai ga jai. A popular pseudo-historical film about Wing Chun and featuring Wing Chun used in most of its fight scenes.
Plain Jane to the Rescue	John Woo	Josephine Siao, Ricky Hui	1982	When Fang tries to embrace Lam Ah Chun for a kiss, she uses Wing Chung techniques against him with the exclamation "Wing Chung!"
Twin Dragons	Ringo Lam, Tsui Hark	Jackie Chan	1992	Hong Kong martial arts action film.
Wing Chun	Yuen Woo-ping	Michelle Yeoh, Donnie Yen	1994	A film about Yim Wing Chun (after whom Wing Chun Kung Fu was named). Fo Shan Zan xian sheng-Descendant of Wing Chun
Rumble in the Bronx	Stanley Tong	Jackie Chan	1995	Near the beginning of the movie, Keung (Chan) practices on a wooden training dummy commonly used in Wing Chun practice.
Bangkok Dangerous	Pang Brothers	Nicolas Cage	2008	Cage demonstrates Wing Chun during the film.
Ip Man	Wilson Yip	Donnie Yen	2008	A semi-biographical tale of the Wing Chun grandmaster Ip Man during the invasion of his hometown in the second Sino-Japanese war. Donnie Yen trained with Ip Chun (Ip Man's son and a Wing Chun martial artist) while preparing for his role.
Sherlock Holmes	Guy Ritchie	Robert Downey Jr.	2009	Robert Downey Jr. made use of Wing Chun (along with sword fighting techniques, as well as Bartitsu) to portray Sherlock Holmes as an efficient fighter in various fight scenes.
Bruce Lee, My Brother	Raymond Yip, Manfred Wong	Hafidz Roshdi	2010	
Kung Fu Wing Chun	Joe Cheung	Jing Bai, Shaoqun Yu	2010	
The Legend Is Born: Ip Man	Herman Yau		2010	A semi-biographical film during the young days of Ip Man. Ip Chun, Ip Man's real son (and Wing Chun instructor) stars in the film as Ip Man's master, Leung Bik.
Ip Man 2	Wilson Yip	Donnie Yen	2010	A semi-biographical story about events in Ip Man's life following his migration to Hong Kong. Donnie Yen trained with Ip Chun (a Wing Chun martial artist and Ip Man's son) while preparing for his role.
I Love Wing Chun	Lex Tsai	Yuen Wah, Qiu Yuen	2011	Primarily a comedy with a few fight scenes.
Mugamoodi	Mysskin	Jiiva, Narain	2012	A Tamil super hero film which is based on the chase and capture of a serial robber gang. The movie extensively used the Wing Chun style of fighting between the hero and the villain. The actors were trained by Tony Leung.
Ip Man: The Final Fight	Herman Yau	Anthony Wong Chau-Sang	2013	In postwar Hong Kong, legendary Wing Chun grandmaster Ip Man is reluctantly called into action once more, when what begin as simple challenges from rival kung fu styles soon draw him into the dark and dangerous underworld of the Triads. Now, to defend life and honor, he has no choice but to fight one last time.
The Grandmaster	Wong Kar-wai	Tony Leung Chiu Wai, Ziyi Zhang, Jin Zhang	2013	The story of IP Man, from a young age through to his move to Hong Kong where he struggled to support his family. A true epic film.
Impetuous Love in Action	Frankie Chan	Jade Lin	2014	Comedy movie. Wing Chun Beauty Boxing Hall (Wing Chun school), with spoofing Bruce Lee in a fight scene.
The Final Master	Xu Haofeng	Liao Fan, Jiang Wenli, Chin Shih-chieh, Song Jia	2015	A Wing Chun master has to defeat 8 martial arts schools to open his own school, yet he has become a chess piece to the local power dynamics.
Ip Man 3	Wilson Yip	Donnie Yen, Mike Tyson, Wenwen Han, Zhang Jin	2015	When a band of brutal gangsters led by a crooked property developer make a play to take over the city, Master Ip is forced to take a stand.
Master Z: Ip Man Legacy	Yuen Woo-ping	Max Zhang, Michelle Yeoh, Tony Jaa	2018	Max Zhang uses Wing Chun at the end against the main villain
Ne Zha	Jiaozi	Lü Yanting	2019	Ao Bing uses Wing Chun in hand-to-hand combat.
Ip Man 4: The Finale	Wilson Yip	Donnie Yen, Wu Yue, Scott Adkins	2019	
Ne Zha 2	Jiaozi	Lü Yanting	2025	Ao Bing uses Wing Chun in hand-to-hand combat.
M3GAN 2.0	Gerard Johnstone	Allison Williams, Violet McGraw	2025	M3GAN practices Wing Chun on a wooden dummy.
Attrition	Mathieu Weschler	Steven Seagal	2018	Steven Seagal uses Wing Chun in nearly all fight scenes, except for a Aikido take down as finishing move.

== See also ==
- List of martial arts films
