= Glossary of Wing Chun terms =

These are terms used in the Chinese martial art, Wing Chun. They are originally colloquial Cantonese (or Foshan spoken dialect). Thus, their meanings might be difficult to trace. Some of those terms are used in Jeet Kune Do, sometimes with a different meaning.

== Forms ==
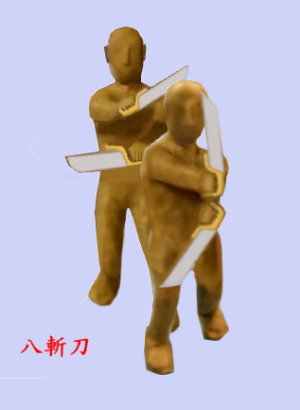
Butterfly knives for close combat

- Siu Nim Tau (simplified Chinese: 小念头; traditional Chinese: 小念頭; pinyin: xiǎo niàn tou; Jyutping: siu2 nim6 tau4; lit. 'little idea beginning' (Note: "Nim Lik (念力)" is literally translated as "Idea Power" in CHU's 2011 book)) A small form holding the main ideas of the system. It emphasizes proper structure, occupying the centerline, and deflecting away from the centerline. It is purely handwork with no footwork. Other than basic training, at the advanced level it is often used as a qigong form to develop "nim ging" or idea power.
- Chum Kiu (simplified Chinese: 寻桥; traditional Chinese: 尋橋; pinyin: xún qiáo; Jyutping: cam4 kiu4; lit. 'seeking bridge'). This form fleshes out the static Siu Nim Tau form and makes it alive and realistic by adding turns, elbows, stepping, and kicks.
- Biu Ji (simplified Chinese: 镖指; traditional Chinese: 鏢指; pinyin: biāo zhǐ; Jyutping: biu1 zi2; lit. 'dart pointing'). A form that emphasizes emergency hands, techniques that are used to regain the centerline when one is put in a bad position. Reminiscent of the Chinese compass, aka the 'south pointing needle' 指南針. This form has no kicks.
- Muk Yan Jong (simplified Chinese: 木人桩; traditional Chinese: 木人樁; pinyin: mù rén zhuāng; Jyutping: muk6 jan4 zong1; lit. 'wooden man post'). A form more like traditional Chinese martial arts. It combines elements of Siu Nim Tao hand play with side stepping and kicks to facilitate throws and sweeps, as well as attacking from the side gate.
- Staff: Luk Dim Bun Gwan (simplified Chinese: 六点半棍; traditional Chinese: 六點半棍; pinyin: liù diǎn bàn gùn; Jyutping: luk6 dim2 bun3 gwan3; lit. 'six and a half point staff'). A simple staff form for handling a long pole or spear. Due to the nature of the long weapon, the 6.5 Point Staff form is very different from typical Wing Chun body structures thus far, expanding the system into more traditionally Chinese deeply squatted structures and using the side body stance.
- Butterfly swords: Bat Cham Do (simplified Chinese: 八斩刀; traditional Chinese: 八斬刀; pinyin: bā zhǎn dāo; Jyutping: baat3 zaam2 dou1; lit. 'eight slashes blades'). The butterfly swords are the natural extension arms and of the Wing Chun system as a whole, using most of the same hand play and structures as the empty hand forms. The extra danger of handling dual blades is overcome by the long practice of the hand techniques. One could say everything in the Wing Chun system leads up to their usage.

== Family Lineage Titles or Terms ==
As normally seen in English (from Cantonese)	Simp. char.	Trad. char.	Cantonese (Yale transcription)	Mandarin (Pinyin transcription)	Meaning(s) (in English)
Sidai	师弟	師弟	si^{1} dai^{6*2}	shī dì	junior male classmate
Simui	师妹	師妹	si^{1} mui^{6*2}	shī mèi	junior female classmate
Sihing	师兄	師兄	si^{1} hing^{1}	shī xiōng	senior male classmate
Sije	师姐	師姐	si^{1} je^{2}	shī jiě	senior female classmate
Gowlin	教练	教練	gaau^{3} lin^{6}	jiào liàn	instructor or coach
Sifu	师父	師父	si^{1} fu^{2}	shī fù	master
Sisuk	师叔	師叔	si^{1} suk^{1}	shī shū	master's junior male classmate ("叔" = junior uncle)
Sibak	师伯	師伯	si^{1} baak^{3}	shī bó	master's senior male classmate ("伯" = senior uncle)
Sigu (Rare)	师姑	師姑	si^{1} gu^{1}	shī gū	master's female classmate ("姑" = aunt)
Sigung	师公	師公	si^{1} gung^{1}	shī gōng	master's master
Sitaigung	师太公	師太公	si^{1} taai^{3} gung^{1}	shī tài gōng	master's master's master
Sijo	师祖	師祖	si^{1} jou^{2}	shī zǔ	Yim Wing-chun ("師祖" literally means "ancestral master")

== Limb names ==
As normally seen in English (from Cantonese)	Simp. char.	Trad. char.	Cantonese (Yale transcription)	Mandarin (Pinyin transcription)	Meaning(s) (in English)
sao	手	(as simp.)	sau^{2}	shǒu	hand
kuen	拳	(as simp.)	kyun^{4}	quán	fist
jarn	肘	(as simp.)	zaau2	zhǒu	elbow
gerk	脚	腳	geuk^{3}	jiǎo	foot; leg, kick

== Hand technique names ==
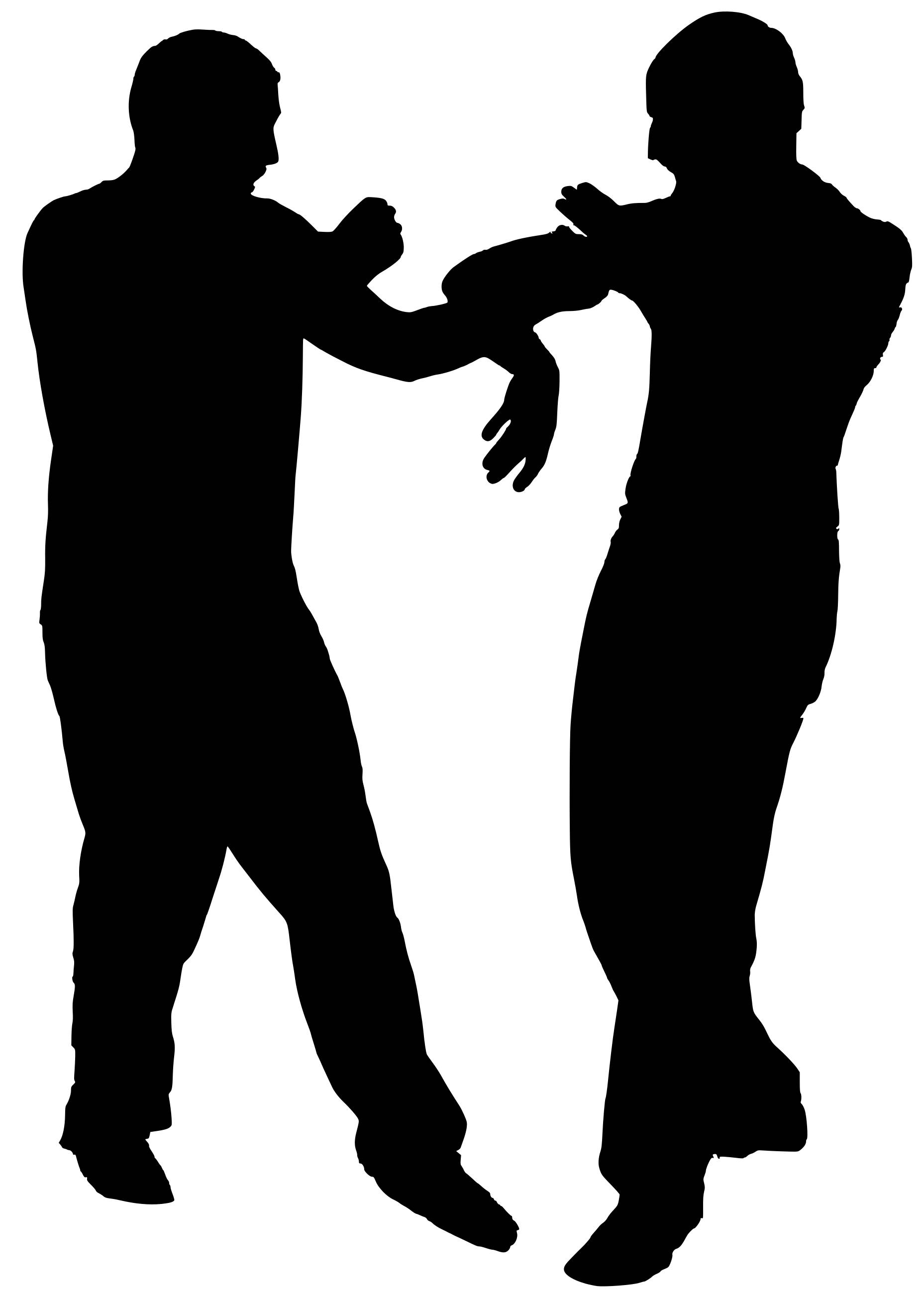
Wing-arc hand

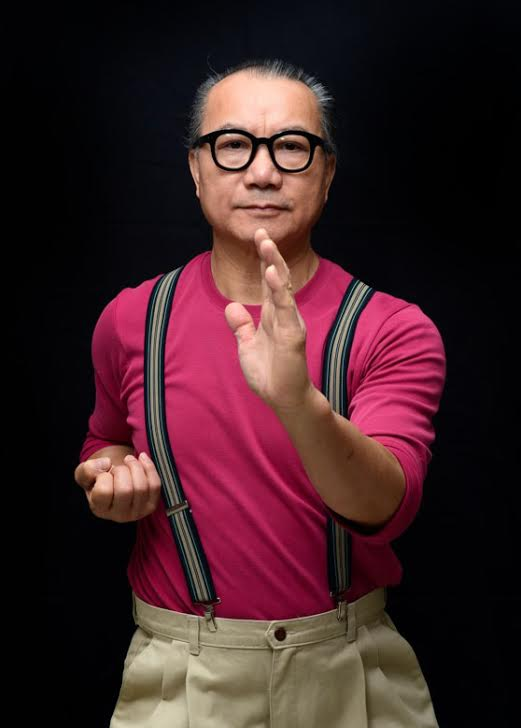
Protecting hand by Wan Kam Leung

Basic Hands

As normally seen in English (from Cantonese)	Simp. char.	Trad. char.	Cantonese (Yale transcription)	Mandarin (Pinyin transcription)	Meaning(s) (in English)	Form (Symbols: /\ upper gate, \/ lower gate, | straight or long bridge, -- Horizontal arm, O Circle)	Function
pak sao	拍手	(same)	paak3 sau2	pāi shǒu	slapping Hand	/\ rising diagonal arm, palm forward	palm shooting forward to intercept and collapse bridge
lap sao	拉手	(same)	laap6	là shǒu	pulling hand	| vertical arm with grabbing hand	pulls down opponent's bridge arm to open up their centerline
tan sao	摊手	攤手	taan^{1} sau^{2}	tān shǒu	spreading hand	/\ rising vertical arm, palm up	roller arm that spreads outside pressure away from centerline
bong sao	膀手	(same)	bong^{2} sau^{2}	bǎng shǒu	winging hand	\/ falling diagonal arm, palm hangs loosely facing away from centerline	deflecting force across centerline; rolling down on wrist pressure to cover center
fook sao	伏手	(same)	fuk^{6} sau^{2}	fú shǒu	taming hand	/\ rising diagonal arm, palm down or hand hangs loosely to the side	covering bridge from above, preventing forward and upward movement, and deflecting inside pressure across centerline
wu sao	护手	護手	wu^{6} sau^{2}	hù shǒu	protecting hand	/\ rising diagonal arm, palm facing centerline, fingers up	hand held in rear behind a lead hand. Intercepts forward when centerline is breached
hyun sao	圈手	(same)	hyun1 sau2	quán shǒu	circle hand	O a wrist circle, with the hand dipping down and coming up or coming down on the opposite side	small circling around arm to change inside gate to outside gate or back

=== Additional Techniques ===
As normally seen in English (from Cantonese)	Simp. char.	Trad. char.	Cantonese (Yale transcription)	Mandarin (Pinyin transcription)	Meaning(s) (in English)	Form (Symbols: /\ upper gate, \/ lower gate, | straight or long bridge, -- Horizontal arm, O Circle)	Function
biu sao	镖手	鏢手	biu^{1} sau^{2}	biāo shǒu	darting hand	|| long bridge arm, with fingers pointed forward	inserts inside or from below into opponent's gate. Peels hands off arms by thrusting.
fak sao	拂手	(same)	faak1 sau2	fú shǒu	whisking hand	-- horizontal arm lashing forward	arm that lashes out forward toward the opponent from across the centerline toward their centerline
gang sao; garn sao	耕手	(as simp.)	gaang^{1} sau^{2}	gēng shǒu	ploughing hand	/\\/ diagonal chopping hand	covers side gate, chopping outward or chopping inward
gam sao	揿手	撳手	gam^{6} sau^{2}	qìn shǒu	pressing hand	\/ falling diagonal forearm, bent elbow, palm faces down	presses down on the opponent's bridge or body to pin them down
jam sao	沉手	(as simp.)	cam^{2} sau^{2}	chén shǒu	sinking hand	|| pointing forward advancing arm	wrist snaps forward and down to sink opponent's brige
jip sao	接手	(as simp.)	jip^{3} sau^{2}	jiē shǒu	catching hand	/\ paired hands pointed forward catching in between	claps toward the centerline. Catches arms in between. Can catch upper and lower arm for controlling whole body, or wrist and elbow for locking.
jit sao	切手	(as simp.)	zip3 sau2	qiè shǒu	cutting hand	/\ rising diagonal arm	forearm that cuts forward and down into the opponents bridge from outside to make an opening.
jong sao	护手	樁手	zong1 sau2	chōng shǒu	post hand	|| arm forward, fingers pointed forward	an arm that wedges forward along the centerline; the wu sao but extended forward
jut sao	窒手	(as simp.)	jat^{6} sau^{2}	zhì shǒu	stopping hand	|| pointing forward retreating arm	wrist snaps back and down to make the opponent's bridge point downward away instead of incoming
kau sao	扣手	(same)	kau3 sau2	kòu shǒu	scooping hand	O circle hand, elbow draw back, body turn	circles out to cup outside arm, jerks horizontally to turn opponent
kwan sao	捆手	(same)	kwan2 sau2	kǔn shǒu	rolling hand	/\O\/ high wu hand, low bong hand	present forearms that block high and low gates, cycle arms in a vertical circle while body turning to switch sides.
lan sao	拦手	攔手	laan^{4} sau^{2}	lán shǒu	barring hand	-- horizontal arm	a horizontal arm that is used to frame on the opponent, or keep them away
man sao	问手	問手	man6 sau2	wèn shǒu	asking hand	|| pointing forward advancing arm	lead hand that preemptively shoots forward to invade opponent's space; also upward slash to cover side gate
po pai sao	破排手	(same)	po3 paai4 sau2	pò pái shǒu	breaking frame hand	/\O\/ two palms on a line that circle around	double palms that circle around to the empty angle and push the opponent away, can be vertical, horizontal or diagonal
tai sao	提手	(as simp.)	tai^{4} sau^{2}	tí shǒu	raising hand	|| long bridge arm moving vertically	arm the presses up on the opponent's bridge to raise it up out of the way
tok sao	托手	(as simp.)	tok^{3} sau^{2}	tuō shǒu	propping hand	\/ low rising arm, palm up	props upward and forward to uproot opponent, or make a steady base for a joint-lock.

== Drills ==
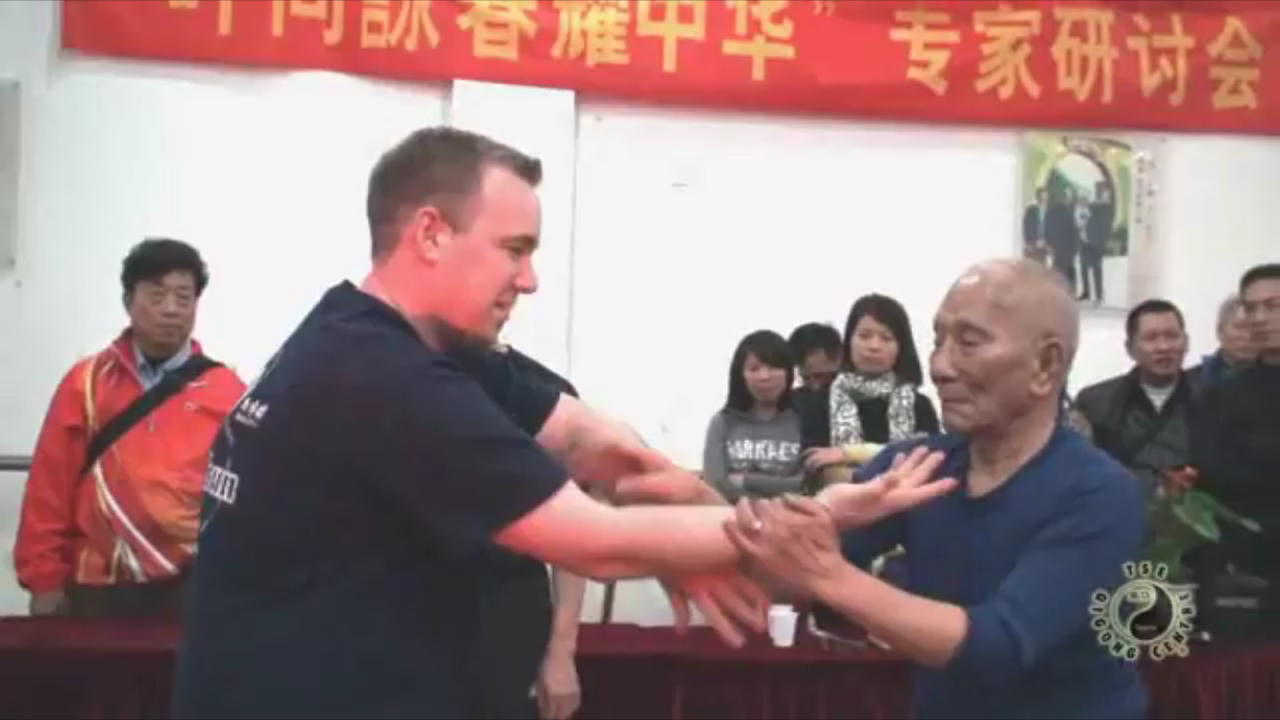
Double sticky hands by Ip Chun

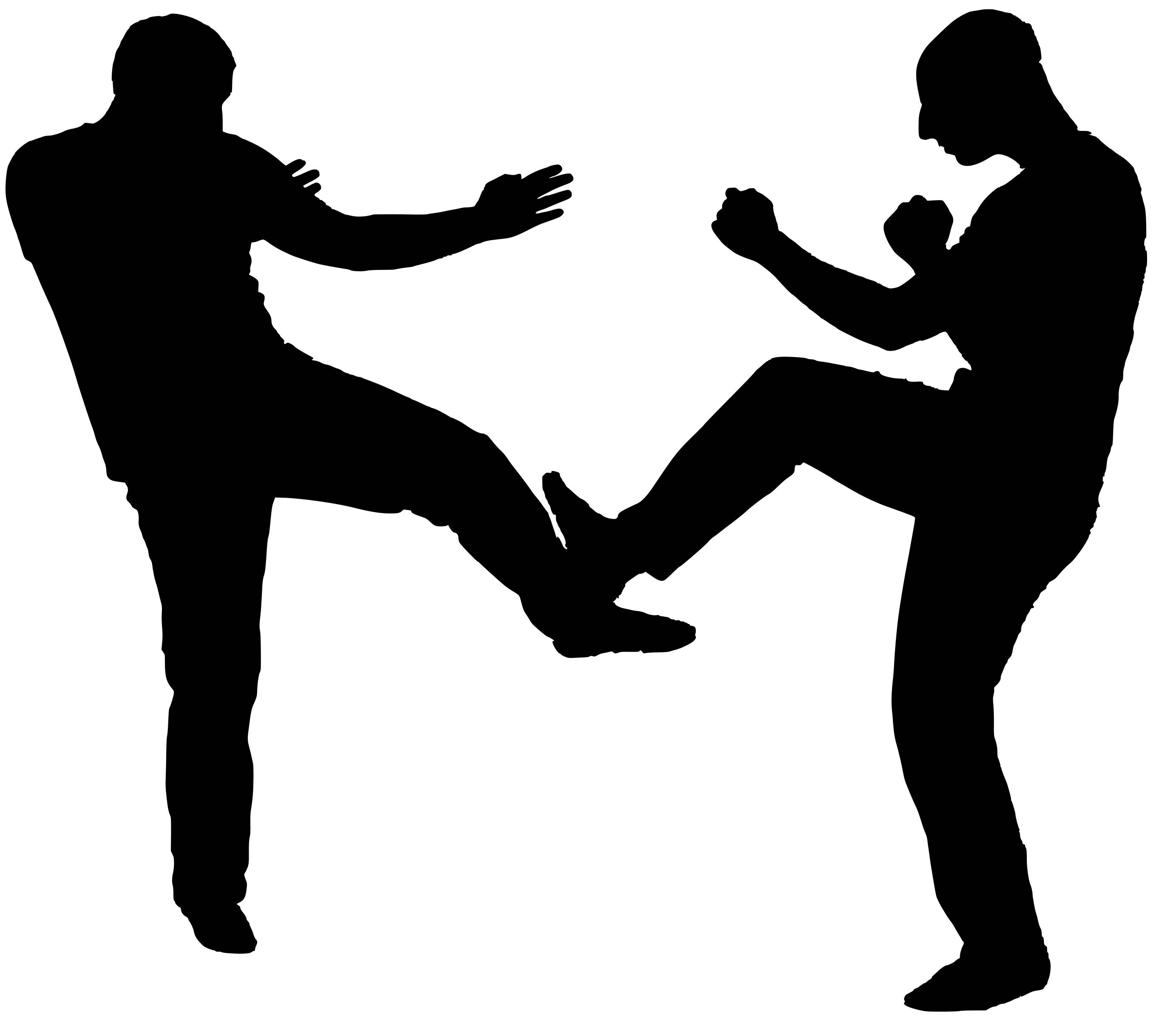
Sticky feet

	Simp. char.	Trad. char.	Cantonese (Yale transcription)	Mandarin (Pinyin transcription)	Meaning(s) (in English)
Daan Chi Sau	单黐手	單黐手	daan^{1} chi^{1} sau^{2}	dān chī shǒu	single sticky hands
Seung Chi Sau	双黐手	雙黐手	seung^{1} chi^{1} sau^{2}	shuāng chī shǒu	double sticky hands
Luk Sau	碌手	(as simp.)	luk^{1} sau^{2}	lù shǒu	rolling arms
Chi Geuk	黐脚	黐腳	chi^{1} geuk^{3}	chī jiǎo	sticky feet

Other techniques:

1. Lin wan kuen - chain punch
2. One-inch punch
3. Double punch
4. Zao gek - hacking elbow strike
5. Pai jarn - horizontal
6. Kwan sau - rotating hand
7. Yee jee kim yueng ma – horse stance, small adduction goat stance, or figure 2 stance
8. Centerline training
9. Iron palm training
