= Ip Man 4: The Finale =

2019 Hong Kong film by Wilson Yip

- Theatrical release poster
- Traditional Chinese: 葉問4：完結篇
- Simplified Chinese: 叶问4：完结篇
- Jyutping: Jip6 Man6 Sei3: Jyun4git3 Pin1
- Directed by: Wilson Yip
- Written by: Edmond Wong; Dana Fukazawa; Chan Tai Lee; Jil Leung Lai Yin
- Produced by: Raymond Wong; Wilson Yip; Donnie Yen; Princeton Lock
- Starring: Donnie Yen; Wu Yue; Vanness Wu; Scott Adkins; Kent Cheng; Danny Chan; Ngo Ka-nin
- Cinematography: Cheng Siu-Keung
- Edited by: Cheung Ka-fai
- Music by: Kenji Kawai
- Production companies: Mandarin Motion Pictures; Tin Tin Film Production
- Distributed by: Well Go USA (United States)
- Release date: 20 December 2019
- Running time: 105 minutes
- Countries: Hong Kong; China
- Languages: Chinese (dialect: Cantonese; Mandarin); English
- Budget: $52 million
- Box office: US$193.3 million

Ip Man 4: The Finale is a 2019 biographical martial arts film directed by Wilson Yip and starring Donnie Yen as Ip Man. It is the fourth and final film in the Ip Man film series, which is loosely based on the life of the Wing Chun grandmaster of the same name.

A co-production of Hong Kong and China, the film began production in April 2018 and ended in July of the same year. It was released on 20 December 2019 and became the highest grossing Chinese film in Malaysia and Singapore, as well as the 5th highest grossing Hong Kong film in Mainland China. Although Ip Man 4 was originally intended to conclude the series, a fifth film was later announced.

== Plot ==
In 1964, Ip Man is diagnosed with throat cancer due to his history of chronic smoking. After his rebellious son Ip Ching fights back against a bully and is expelled from school, Ip Man decides to travel to San Francisco in order to look for study opportunities. After Ching and his father get into a heated argument that ends with the older Ip striking his son in the face, he entrusts Ching to his friend, Fat Po.

Ip arrives in San Francisco, where his student Bruce Lee has upset the local martial arts community by opening a kung fu school, teaching non-Chinese people martial arts, and writing a book explaining Chinese martial arts in English. He discovers from his reporter friend Liang Gen that, because he is a foreigner, he needs a referral letter from the Chinese Consolidated Benevolent Association to enroll Ching into an American school. The association's chairman, Tai Chi master Wan Zonghua, refuses to write the letter as Ip is unbothered by Lee's actions, whereas the other grandmasters openly disapprove.

While leaving the school after a meeting with the principal, Ip sees Wan's teenage daughter, Yonah, undergoing a racist attack from a rival cheerleader, Becky, and her male friends. Ip steps in to rescue her and escorts Yonah home, where Wan is upset that she got into a fight. Ip tells Wan that Yonah was not wrong to defend herself, but Wan rebukes him by claiming that Ip, as a foreigner, cannot understand the tension between whites and Chinese in America. Just before Ip leaves, Wan accuses him of using his daughter to get the letter and challenges him to a fight for it. The duel is interrupted by an earthquake, and Wan says they will finish it at the upcoming Mid-Autumn Festival in Chinatown. Ip refuses, affirming that he merely accompanied Yonah home for her own safety, and leaves.

Meanwhile, Becky lies to her parents, claiming that Yonah attacked her. Her father, Andrew Walters, an officer of the INS, is pressured by his wife Gabriella into holding the Association responsible and deporting all illegal immigrants associated with them. Elsewhere, Hartman Wu, a staff sergeant in the US Marines and student of Lee, attempts to persuade Barton Geddes, the Gunnery Sergeant on his base, to incorporate Chinese martial arts into their hand-to-hand combat training. Geddes, an openly racist man, seemingly proves the Marines' current karate program superior by having Hartman fight the Marines' karate sensei, Colin Frater, with Frater easily besting Hartman.

However, Hartman manages to convince the unit's commanding officer of kung fu's potential use, and is permitted to film the Festival for research purposes; the infuriated Geddes instructs Frater to challenge the grandmasters at the Festival. Frater easily takes down 3 of the grandmasters before Ip intervenes and defeats him, hospitalising him. Meanwhile, Wan, who was supposed to be present at the Festival, is arrested by the INS. Upon seeing Frater in the hospital, Geddes barges into the Association building and uses his strength and karate prowess to brutally defeat all the grandmasters present. He then threatens Walters into releasing Wan into Marine custody before bringing Wan into the camp to fight him. Due to a tip-off by Billy, a subordinate of Walters and student of Lee, the Association is evacuated by the time the INS conducts its raid. Lee provides refuge for the Association, earning their respect.

At the camp, Wan and Geddes fight, with Wan at first able to match Geddes, but he is eventually overwhelmed and seriously injured. Wan is taken to the hospital, where an emotional Ip calls Fat Bo to reveal his cancer; Fat Bo then angrily forces Ching to talk to his father, after many previous refusals. The older Ip apologizes to his son for striking him, and promises to teach Ching kung fu when he returns to Hong Kong. Hartman brings Ip to the Marines, and he triumphantly defeats Geddes after a long, strenuous fight.

Wan prepares the referral letter for Ip, but Ip turns it down, having decided against moving to America. Ip returns to Hong Kong and accepts that Ching likes martial arts. A weary but determined Ip instructs his son to film him as he demonstrates Wing Chun on a wooden dummy.

An epilogue shows Lee paying respect to Ip at his funeral. Onscreen text states that Ip succumbed to his cancer in 1972 at the age of 79, and that the Marines officially incorporated Chinese kung fu into their training by inviting Chinese martial artists to train them in 2001.

== Cast ==
- Donnie Yen as Ip Man (葉問), an unassuming Chinese Wing Chun master originally from Foshan.
- Wu Yue as Wan Zonghua (萬宗華), chairman of the Chinese Benevolent Association (CBA) and Master of Tai Chi.
- Vanness Wu (credited simply as "Van Ness") as Hartman Wu (吳赫文), U.S. Marine Corps staff sergeant and Bruce Lee's student.
- Scott Adkins as Barton Geddes, a corrupt, racist U.S. Marine Corps gunnery sergeant and Karate expert.
- Kent Cheng as Fat Bo (肥波), a friend of Ip Man.
- Danny Chan as Bruce Lee (李小龍), owner of a San Francisco martial arts school and Ip Man's student.
- Simon Shiyamba as Billy, a black INS officer and Bruce Lee's student.
- Ngo Ka-nin as Liang Gen (梁根), friend of Ip Man and reporter.
- Chris Collins as Colin Frater, a racist U.S. Marine Corps Karate master.
- Vanda Margraf (李宛妲) as Yonah Wan (萬若男), daughter of Wan Zonghua.
- Ye He as Ip Ching (葉正), Ip Man's second son.
- Lo Mang as Law Chun-ting (羅駿霆), friend of Ip Man and Master of Monkey Kung Fu.
- Grace Englert as Becky Walters, Andrew and Gabrielle's daughter who racially bullies Yonah.
- Andrew Lane as Andrew Walters, a xenophobic INS officer, Becky's father and Gabrielle's husband.
- Nicola Stuart-Hill as Gabrielle Walters, Becky's mother and Andrew's wife.
- Linda Jean Barry as School principal.
- Mark Strange as Karate champion
- Princeton Lock as Hou Jin (浩然), friend of Ip Ching.
- DBO Fundz as Rapper

In addition, several actors appear in cameos as characters from the previous films in a flashback sequence via archive footage, including Lynn Hung as Cheung Wing-sing (張永成), Ip Man's deceased wife; Gordon Lam as Li Chiu (李釗), a police officer from Foshan; Huang Xiaoming as Wong Leung (黃梁), Ip Man's first student; Sammo Hung as the late Hung Chun-nam (洪震南), an asthmatic Hung Ga master; Mike Tyson as Frank, an American property developer; Sarut Khanwilai as Suchart, a Thai boxer; Zhang Jin as Cheung Tin-chi (張天志), a former Wing Chun master who was defeated by Ip Man in a duel; the late Darren Shahlavi as Taylor "The Twister" Miller, an English boxing champion who was defeated by Ip Man; and Simon Yam as Chow Ching-chuen (周清泉), Ip Man's old friend.

== Production ==
On 30 September 2016, Donnie Yen (who portrayed the Wing Chun grandmaster Ip Man in three films) announced that he and series director Wilson Yip would return for the fourth film in the series. Writer Edmond Wong also returned. Producer Raymond Wong said he paid Yen "a hefty amount of money" to return for the fourth film. Principal photography began in April 2018, and ended that July. Filming locations included China, Pensby High School, Crosby Beach and Preston, Lancashire. In September 2019, Donnie Yen said Ip Man 4 would be the last film in the series.

== Music ==
In addition to the original music by Kenji Kawai, the promotional recording called Wing Chun is performed by Li Yuchun.

== Release ==
Ip Man 4: The Finale was released on 20 December 2019. The film had a limited release on 25 December 2019, in the United States distributed by Well Go USA. It was released by CMC Pictures in Australia and New Zealand on 20 December 2019.

== Reception ==
On the review aggregator website Rotten Tomatoes, 85% of 33 critics' reviews are positive, with an average rating of 6.5/10. The website's consensus reads: "Packed with action and featuring some of Donnie Yen's finest fighting, Ip Man 4: The Finale serves as a satisfying rebound – and fitting finale – for the franchise." Metacritic, which uses a weighted average, assigned the film a score of 62 out of 100, based on 11 critics, indicating "generally favorable" reviews.

According to the Malaysian newspaper The Star, the movie was the highest grossing Chinese film of all time in the country while according to Shine.cn, the movie was the third highest grossing Chinese film in North America in five years.

=== Box office ===
As of March 2020, the film has grossed over US$239 million worldwide. In Mainland China, it grossed CN¥1.183 billion ($197.2 million). In Hong Kong, it was the third highest-grossing film of 2019 with HK$22.54 million (US$2.9 million). At the Taiwanese box office, it grossed NT$185 million (US6.15 million). As of 5 January 2020, the film's Singapore box office is US$6.74 million, and the Malaysian box office is over RM 36 million (US8.6 million).

== Controversy ==
During the 2019 Hong Kong protests, protesters urged a boycott of the film, citing the pro-Beijing stances of actors Donnie Yen and Danny Chan and producer Raymond Wong. Protesters actively spoiled the film on social media in both English and Chinese.

== Sequel ==
Although Ip Man 4 was intended to be the conclusion to Ip Man's story, on 18 May 2023, a new Ip Man movie titled Ip Man 5 was announced by Mandarin Motion Pictures at the Cannes Film Festival. Donnie Yen also put the poster for the film on his Instagram.

== See also ==
- Donnie Yen filmography
- List of films featuring Wing Chun
