= Vanda Margraf =

Chinese actress (born 2003)

- 李宛妲
- Born: Vanda Lee Margraf; June 18, 2003 (age 23); Jinghong City, Xishuangbanna Prefecture, Yunnan, China
- Other name: Li Wanda
- Education: Beijing Dance Academy
- Occupation: Actress
- Years active: 2019–present
- Agent: Jet Tone Productions
- Notable work: Ip Man 4: The Finale

Vanda Lee Margraf (simplified Chinese: 万达·李·马格拉夫; traditional Chinese: 萬達·李·馬格拉夫; pinyin: Wàndá Lǐ Mǎgélāfū; born June 18, 2003) is a Chinese actress. She gained widespread recognition for her role as Yonah in the Hollywood film Ip Man 4: The Finale (2019) and has since starred in major television productions such as Northward and The One.

== Biography ==
Margraf was born in Jinghong City, Xishuangbanna, Yunnan Province, on June 18, 2003, to Josef Margraf (Chinese name; Ma You (馬悠)), a German ecologist who worked on the restoration and reconstruction of the Xishuangbanna tropical rainforest, and Minguo Lee (pinyin: Lǐ Mínguǒ), a Chinese environmentalist who worked alongside him to help restore the rainforest ecosystem. She has an older sister named Linda. She and her elder sister Linda were single-handedly raised by their mother, following their father’s death from a heart attack in 2010 when Margraf was seven years old.

Since her parents’ were active in environmental work to preserve and protect the area’s rainforest, she and her sister spent much of their childhood in Xishuangbanna’s dense forest. She recalls regularly volunteering with her sister to raise awareness of the unique ecosystems found there, and even taking part in television shows to reach a wider audience.

In 2017, she enrolled in the Affiliated Secondary School of Beijing Dance Academy, majoring in singing and dancing. Margraf is bilingual. In addition to her native Chinese, she is fluent in English.

== Career ==
As a child, Margraf appeared on many television shows to help raise awareness of the tropical rainforest of Xishuangbanna alongside her sister Linda. One of these was China's Got Talent, they performed together as the duo "Rainy Night Elves". During her first appearance on China's Got Talent, her striking appearance caught the attention of film director Wong Kar-wai, who offered her a contract with his agency, Jet Tone Productions. On March 18, 2019, she officially announced that she had signed with the agency. Through his recommendation, she was cast in Ip Man 4: The Finale — this role marked both her acting debut and her first appearance in a Hollywood production.

== Filmography ==
=== Film ===
Year	Title	Role	Notes	Ref.
2019	Ip Man 4: The Finale	Yonah Wan		
2024	The Traveller	Feng Baobao	Lead role	
2025	Detective Chinatown 1900	Princess Da		
2025	Our Destiny	Shen Zhu Xi	Lead role	
2026	Cry of the Birds	Zhao Xiao Mu	Lead role	

=== Television ===
Year	Title	Role	Notes	Ref.
2025	Northward	Ma Siyi	Lead role	
2026	The Days of Seclusion and Love	Guan Feng Yue	Lead role	
TBA	The One	Ning Yao	Lead role	
TBA	The Infinite 10 Days	Yun Yao		
