= Pan Nam =

Chinese Grandmaster of Wing Chun Kung Fu

- Born: 24 December 1911; Huazhou District, China
- Died: 28 October 1995 (aged 83); Foshan, China
- Native name: 彭南
- Other names: Peng Nan; Pang Nam; Black Face Nam.
- Style: Wing Chun
- Teachers: Gan Zhu; Ma Fen; Chen Tian; Zhaoju; Li Zibin; Liang Xisu; Wu Wenlong; Li Yechi; Chung Bo
- Rank: Grandmaster
- Years active: 1924-1995

Other information
- Occupation: Martial artist
- Notable club: Foshan Jingwu Sports Association

Pan Nam or Peng Nan (彭南) was a Chinese martial artist and Grandmaster of the Wing Chun style. In 1994, he was awarded the title of "Guangdong Wulin Hundred Masters". The popular Pan Nam Wing Chun Tournament which began in 2018 was named after Nam.

== Early years ==
Peng Nan was born on 24 December 1911, and lived at No. 223 Gaoji Street, Foshan, Guangdong. His family was originally from Hua County, Guangdong, and moved to Foshan in the Qing dynasty. Nam was not tall. He started martial arts at the age of 13, and he was a beginner in Shaolin Boxing, Hong Boxing, Bie Da and Wing Chun (the legend is Kuaishou Wing Chun). At the age of 36 (1947), he learned Wing Chun from Master Zhaoju. Master Zhaoju is a direct disciple of Chen Huashun's disciple Chen Rumian, an apprentice of Ryazan at Wing Chunmen, Foshan, and he was good at Wing Chun (Zhao died in Shiqi, Zhongshan in 1972).

Nam had a slap-sized mole on his right face, known as Heimiannan. Nam's name is unknown to the martial arts seniors in Guangzhou, Foshan, Zhongshan, Nanhai and Sanshui.

There are wooden stakes in the hall of the Nam's house, and the walls are covered with various weapons, knives, guns, swords and sticks for practice. He never stopped practicing Wing Chun, which is highly praised and admired by friends in the martial arts world. Nam practiced a variety of martial arts before he was 30 years old. He also learned Wing Chun before he became a grandmaster, but he was only an outsider, but he did not shy away from public opinion and learned from masters of the same age of Wing Chun.

After the founding of the People's Republic of China, Nam participated in the Guangdong Province Wushu Observation Competition in 1957. Master Li Yechi was invited as a guest at the conference, and Nam met Master Li Yechi (1898-1970). According to seniority, Master Li Yechi should be Master Nam's fellow master-uncle. After Nam met Master Li Yechi, he often consulted him for advice, and every time he was easily subdued by Master Li Yechi. For a long time, under Nam's humility, Master Li Yechi passed on the skills to Nam without reservation, and pointed out that the essence of it is the "come, stay, go, and send." At the moment of losing power, the opponent was defeated by the technique of the inner family). From then on, Nam kept humbly asking Master Li Yechi for advice, and tried his best to pass on his truth.

== Career in martial artists ==
In his later years, Master Peng Nan did a lot of sorting work on Wing Chun's small thoughts, bridge search, indexing and eight-cut knives, and hoped to be published in a book in the future. For this reason, he also left the secret of Wing Chun: Master Peng often warned his disciples: To learn martial arts, you must get rid of the prejudices, otherwise it will be hard to make progress.

Nam enthusiastically participated in the work of Foshan Jingwu Association and did a lot of work for the establishment of Foshan Wing Chun Research Association. In his later years, Nam did a lot of excavation and sorting work in order to organize Foshan Wing Chun into a book and publish it, and to spread and develop Wing Chun.

Nam has studied art from many masters in his life. They are: Master Gan Zhu (1931); Master Ma Fen (1942, Xinan Shaolin Boxing); Master Chen Tian (1943, furthering Shaolin Boxing); Li Zibin Master (learning southern lion dance, bone setting, trauma, miscellaneous disease and martial arts); recruiting master (1947, learning Wing Chun); Master Liang Xisu (learning Southern Shaolin, equipment); Master Wu Wenlong (learning Qigong "Five Fingers" "Pieces"). Nam has never stopped learning and researching martial arts throughout his life, never satisfied.

Nam taught his apprentices in his later years, focusing on Wing Chun. Due to historical reasons, Wing Chun is widely spread around Foshan. This extremely rich connotation of the Southern Shaolin School Kung fu focuses on actual combat and simple and unpretentious moves. The "indeterminate force and roots" mentioned in the Quan Jue means "bending hands to stay in the middle, coming and staying to send, concealed shots, feminine and non-exposed, strong and soft, both internal and external, and up and down. Therefore, Wing Chun Quan It is a kind of boxing that emphasizes technique and has no fixed form."

In 1986, Foshan Jingwu Sports Association was started by Nam, and it has claimed to have unified the Wing Chun of different schools. Foshan Pengnan Wing Chun is integrated into Hong Quan style, so it is called "Wing Chun Hand, Hong Quan Jin", and it is actually a blend of different types of fists in Foshan, Ryazan's direct line (Ip Man) approach.

Nam passed on his lineage overseas to the United States.

== Pan Nam Wing Chun Tournament ==
In 2018 the first Pan Nam Wing Chun Boxing Tournament hosted by the Gaoming District's Wushu Lion Sports Association in Hecheng Square. More than 200 people from all the groups under the Pan Nam zong branch participated in the competition, a total of 55 competitions ran throughout the day.

A lion dance performance kicked off the event. Group events of 14 people took turns to stand and punch. The children completed their martial arts routines on stage. In addition, there were also duel exercises. The competition consisted of the children's group, the adults group, and the juvenile group.

Pan Nam Wing Chun Boxing is one of the most important styles of Wing Chun boxing. The purpose of organizing the "2018 First Pan Nam Wing Chun Competition" is to contact disciples from all over the world, to experience the development of "Pan Nam Wing Chun" and to test the inheritance of disciples from different generations. The technical level so far provides parameters and experience as a basis for future competitions, it is also to unite with the same family, work together to inherit the skills, and jointly carry forward the skills of Pan Nam.

== Pan Nam style ==
Techniques include plowing and blocking the stall, sticking and swaying; pushing, pulling, pressing, tangling the hanging leak; bending hands to stay in the middle, staying and sending; shaking hands straight, pressing the head to the tail, pressing the tail to the head, pressing the middle to float; The enemy moves, the center of gravity is empty, the hands are sticky and unable to walk; the big flash side, the small pitch, the small flash side, the big pitch; keep in mind the trial situation (note: the trial situation refers to the eye method, it is the prerequisite for defeating the enemy. Quan Jing says : Boxing is valuable in judging the current situation. Judging the situation has two meanings, for oneself it is to accumulate momentum, for the other party it is to take advantage of the situation). The second bridge is on the rise, and the inner curtain must compete. Be aware of the movement, knowing to return, knowing whether there is, knowing to advance and retreat. One punch and one palm (Note: There are three stops in the blow, one stop at the shoulder, the second stop at the elbow crutch, and the third stop at the base of the palm. If you want to focus on the base of your palm and your fingertips, you must practice "little thoughts" often and persevere. It will be natural, and the qi can be sent at will), one horse one step, one step should be light, the horse should be steady, the waist and the hips should not move, the bridge will not move, and the bridge will move the waist and hips.

- Footwork: hook, stitch, flick, kick.
- Footwork: inch, crutch, tease, kill, step on.

Nam's style has a set called the Five Petal Plum Flower a classic five part exercise set for tendon strength. In addition to Chi Sao Sticky Hands, the style has a partner practice known as Waist Pressing, a Push Hands like exercise where opponent's try to off balance one another.

These tactics disclosed to readers are not only the essentials for learning Wing Chun techniques, but also provide a rich theoretical basis for studying and researching Wing Chun, and can also play a positive role in the spread and development of Wing Chun in the future.

== Senior years ==
After his retirement, Nam insisted on practicing more than ever, and he still taught his disciples how to practice martial arts in his senior years. He often told us about the origin of Wing Chun and its various anecdotes.

Nam died in Foshan on 28 October 1995. He hoped that his disciples would inherit his last wish, practice martial arts with all their hearts, and organize the precious cultural heritage of Wing Chun into a book for publication.
