= Ip Man 2 =

2010 Hong Kong film by Wilson Yip

- U.S. theatrical poster

Chinese name
- Traditional Chinese: 葉問2:宗師傳奇
Transcriptions
Standard Mandarin
- Hanyu Pinyin: Yè Wèn Èr: Zōng Shī Chuán Qí
Yue: Cantonese
- Jyutping: Jip6 Man6 Ji6: Zung1 Si1 Zyun6 Kei4
- Directed by: Wilson Yip
- Written by: Edmond Wong
- Produced by: Raymond Wong
- Starring: Donnie Yen; Sammo Hung; Huang Xiaoming; Lynn Hung; Darren Shahlavi; Kent Cheng
- Cinematography: Poon Hang-sang
- Edited by: Cheung Ka-fai
- Music by: Kenji Kawai
- Distributed by: Mandarin Films
- Release date: 29 April 2010
- Running time: 109 minutes
- Country: Hong Kong
- Languages: Chinese (dialect: Cantonese; Mandarin); English
- Budget: CN¥100 million (US$12,902,809)
- Box office: US$49,721,954

Ip Man 2 (Chinese: 葉問2:宗師傳奇, also known as Ip Man 2: Legend of the Grandmaster) is a 2010 Hong Kong biographical martial arts film loosely based on the life of Ip Man, a grandmaster of the martial art Wing Chun. A sequel to the 2008 film Ip Man, Ip Man 2 was directed by Wilson Yip and stars Donnie Yen, who reprises the leading role. Continuing after the events of the earlier film, the sequel centres on Ip's early life in British Hong Kong. He attempts to propagate his discipline of Wing Chun, but faces rivalry from other practitioners, including the local master of Hung Ga martial arts, Hung Chun-nam (Sammo Hung), and later the British boxing champion Taylor "The Twister" Miller (Darren Shahlavi).

Producer Raymond Wong first announced a sequel before Ip Man's theatrical release in December 2008. For Ip Man 2, the filmmakers intended to focus on the relationship between Ip and his most famed disciple, Bruce Lee. However, they were unable to finalize film rights with Lee's descendants and decided to briefly portray Lee as a child. Principal photography for Ip Man 2 began in August 2009 and concluded in November; filming took place inside a studio located in Shanghai. For the sequel, Yip aimed to create a more dramatic martial arts film in terms of story and characterization; Wong's son, screenwriter Edmond Wong, wanted the film to explore the treatment of Hong Kongers during the colonial era and Western perceptions of Chinese martial arts.

Ip Man 2 is the second film in the "Ip Man" film series. It premiered in Beijing on 21 April 2010, and was released in Hong Kong on 29 April 2010. The film met with positive reviews, with particular praise for the film's storytelling and Sammo Hung's martial arts choreography. The film grossed over HK$13 million on its opening weekend, immediately surpassing Ip Man's opening weekend gross. During its theatrical run, Ip Man 2 brought in over HK$43 million domestically, and its domestic theatrical gross made it the highest grossing Hong Kong film released during the first half of 2010. In total, Ip Man 2 grossed an estimated US$49 million worldwide. This amount does not include successful DVD sales all over United States, Asia and Europe.

== Plot ==
Wing Chun master Ip Man and his family move to Hong Kong in 1949 after escaping from Japanese-occupied Foshan. In 1950, Ip attempts to open a school to propagate his art, as well as make a living during the difficult times, but struggles to attract students due to his lack of reputation in the city. One day, a young man named Wong Shun Leung appears and promptly challenges Ip to a fight, but is easily defeated. Wong storms off and returns later with a gang of his friends, but Ip easily trounces them as well. Stunned and impressed by Ip's skills, Wong and his friends become Ip's first students, bringing more disciples to help the school thrive. That night, Ip heads to the market to buy food, but sees some shop owners trying to stop a man from stealing their food. Recognising the man as his friend Chow Ching-chuen, Ip intervenes and pays for the food. However, Chow does not recognise him, and his son Yau reveals that his father was shot by the Japanese soldiers for helping Ip, resulting in Chow's current mentally-impaired state.

Wong is later confronted by some thuggish Hung Ga students while posting promotional posters for Ip's school. One of them, Kei, challenges Wong to a fight and loses, but his vengeful friends take Wong hostage and demand a ransom from Ip. Ip goes to the local wet market as directed, but the meeting ends in a confrontation with a growing mob of Hung Ga students. Fighting their way outside and hopelessly outnumbered, Ip and Wong are rescued by Jin Shanzhao, a former bandit and ex-rival of Ip, who comes to their aid with his own gang.

The students' master and head of the coalition of Hong Kong's martial arts clubs, Hung Chun-nam, arrives to break up the fight. Ip introduces himself, and Hung informs him that before setting up a school, he needs to partake in a ceremony to test his worth. Ip, Wong, and Jin are subsequently arrested by Fatso, a Chinese RHKPF detective, for disturbing the peace, but are later released on bail. Hung and Fatso secretly meet with Superintendent Wallace, a corrupt British senior officer, to deliver protection money collected from both the local shops and martial art schools.

Ip attends the ceremony and handily defeats his first two opponents, before battling the last challenger, Hung, to a draw. Ip is allowed to keep running his school in exchange for paying protection fees, but he declines to do so. In response, Hung has his students loiter in front of the Wing Chun school and harass prospective students, resulting in a street brawl between them and Ip's disciples. Ip is thus forced by his landlady to leave the property he leased for his school; the disciples resort to training in the local park.

Ip confronts Hung, who blames him for the recent events since he refused to pay, while Ip criticizes Hung's management of his students and subservience to the foreigners. Hung insists that he is doing what he must and decides to finish off his earlier duel with Ip. Hung's son suddenly appears during this encounter, and Ip stops Hung from accidentally kicking the boy, while also suggesting that he prioritize spending time with his family over their dispute, and his counsel earns him Hung's respect. Ip leaves, and the next day, Hung gives him and his students free tickets to a martial arts exhibition arranged by Wallace and Fatso.

At the exhibition, the various martial arts schools seek to promote themselves, and by extension, Chinese culture. However, Wallace's guest, fraudulent boxer Taylor "The Twister" Miller whom Wallace labels as a world champion, openly insults and assaults the students, causing a brawl that the masters try to quell. Hung demands that Twister apologize for his behaviour; in response, Twister challenges him to a fight, saying that he will apologize if Hung wins. At first, Hung's wide range of skills and techniques give him the edge; however, most of his counterattacks have little effect on the younger and fitter Twister, and he is slowly worn down by the boxer's sheer power. Ip tries to persuade Hung to concede, but the old man refuses, and even stops Ip from throwing in the towel himself. In the final round, Hung has an asthma attack, allowing Twister to gain the upper hand, and Hung is eventually beaten to death against the ropes.

News of Hung's death spreads throughout the city, enraging the Chinese populace. Wallace's superior officer reprimands him over the recent events; incensed, Wallace arrests and tortures Ip's friend, newspaper editor Leung Kan, for publishing the news; Fatso intervenes and releases him with no charges. This results to Wallace taking these matters in his own hands by staging a press conference where he lies that Hung's death was an accident which angers the crowd. Twister's coach announces that, in order to clear his name, he will accept a challenge from any Chinese martial artist. However, Twister openly continues to disrespect the Chinese and boasts that none of them have the courage to face him. Ip arrives and challenges Twister to a fight, while Fatso secretly meets with Kan and offers him compromising information on Wallace. As his pregnant wife goes into labor, Ip prepares for his match with Twister.

Due to his unfamiliarity with Western boxing, Ip is initially at a severe disadvantage, allowing Twister to knock him down several times. However, he gradually manages to use his Wing Chun techniques and superior speed to even the odds. During the match, Wallace and his allies attempt to rig the match in Twister's favor, refusing to penalize him for an illegal hit and issuing a ruling that Ip cannot use kicking attacks or he will be disqualified. After seeing visions of Hung and remembering his own advice to focus on weakening Twister instead of trading blows with him, Ip switches up his strategy, crippling Twister's arms and eventually managing to beat him into unconsciousness with a series of strikes to the head and ears. While the Chinese celebrate, Wallace is arrested by his superiors for corruption, perjury, obstruction of justice, collusion and abuse of power, with Fatso having informed them of this.

Ip addresses the audience, stating his wish for everyone to respect each other despite the differences between their race, culture, or status. Both the Western and Chinese audiences give him a standing ovation, while Twister's manager leaves the arena in both dissatisfaction and disgust. Ip goes home to his family, and meets his newborn son, Ip Ching. Sometime later, Yau introduces his master to a boy named Bruce Lee, who wishes to learn Wing Chun in order to beat up people he doesn't like. An amused Ip smiles and simply tells him to come back when he has grown up.

== Cast ==
=== Main ===
- Donnie Yen as Ip Man (葉問), the sole practitioner of the martial art Wing Chun. He arrives in Hong Kong with his family during the 1940s to settle there and set up a Wing Chun school.
- Sammo Hung as Hung Chun-nam (洪震南), an aging Hung Ga master who has asthma. As head of Hong Kong's martial arts society, he initially clashes with Ip, but later befriends him. He dies in a fight with Twister while trying to defend the honor of his fellow masters.
- Huang Xiaoming as Wong Leung (黃梁), Ip Man's first student. This character is based on Wong Shun Leung (a Chinese martial artist from Hong Kong who studied wing chun kung fu under Ip Man).
- Lynn Hung as Cheung Wing-sing (張永成), Ip Man's wife.
- Simon Yam as Chow Ching-chuen (周清泉), Ip Man's friend, who was responsible for smuggling him and his family into Hong Kong. He roams the streets of Hong Kong as a ragged beggar after a Japanese bullet left him with permanent brain damage, with only his loyal son to protect him.
- Darren Shahlavi as Taylor "The Twister" Miller, an extremely arrogant and racist British boxer fraudulently forged as a world champion. His Chinese nickname is "Whirlwind" (龍捲風). His arrogance results in his defeat at the hands of Ip Man.

=== Supporting ===
- Li Chak as Ip Chun, Ip Man's son.
- Ashton Chen as Tsui Sai-Cheong, one of Ip Man's students.
- Kent Cheng as Fatso (肥波), a Chinese Detective police officer under Superintendent Wallace, helping him manage his protection racket in Hong Kong. He is also Hung Chun-nam's close friend. Disgusted with Wallace's racism, he later arranges for him to be arrested for corruption.
- Dennis To as Cheng Wai-kei (鄭偉基), a gang leader and loyal student of Hung Chun-nam.
- Ngo Ka-nin as Leung Kan (梁根), the chief editor of Hong Kong's leading news agency who looks after Ip Man since their families came from the same village. He later helps Fatso expose Wallace by supplying information about his corruption to the British authorities after falling victim to Wallace's torture.
- Louis Fan as Kam Shan-Chau (金山找), a martial artist and reformed outlaw who befriends Ip Man, having established his own small school in Hong Kong.
- Carlson Cheng as Chow Kwong-yiu (周光耀), Chow Ching-chuen's son. He takes care of his disabled father while working at Leung Kan's news agency.
- Lo Mang as Master Law (羅師傅), a Monkey Kung Fu master.
- Fung Hark-On as Master Cheng (鄭師傅), a Baguazhang master.
- Brian Burrell as Emcee, the host and translator of the final match.
- Jean Favie as Judge who changes the rules of Ip Man's match against Twister under his coach's orders.
- Christian Bachini as Twister supporter.
- Stefan Morawietz as Twister's coach who was behind changing the rules of Ip Man's match.
- Charles Mayer as Wallace, a racist, corrupt Hong Kong Superintendent police and protection racketeer who abuses his office to collect protection money through the local martial arts schools. Following Twister's defeat, he is arrested by one of his superiors for disgracing and embarrassing the entire Royal Hong Kong Police Force, colluding with Twister and his sponsors, falsifying Hung's death being an accident and corruption.

== Production ==
Ip Man 2 is the second feature film overall to be based on the life of Ip Man, following the previous film Ip Man. The sequel is the fifth film collaboration between director Wilson Yip and actor Donnie Yen. Ip Man 2 was produced by Raymond Wong and distributed by his company Mandarin Films upon its theatrical release in Hong Kong. It was the last film Wong produced under his Mandarin Films production banner. Wong's son, Edmond Wong, returned to write the screenplay. Along with appearing in a supporting role, Sammo Hung reprised his role as the film's martial arts choreographer. Kenji Kawai reprised his role as the film's music composer.

=== Development ===
Prior to Ip Man's theatrical release in December 2008, producer Raymond Wong announced plans to develop a sequel to the film. The sequel was intended to focus on the relationship between Ip Man and his most famed disciple Bruce Lee. In March 2009, Wong announced that the Lee character might not appear in the sequel, as producers had not fully finalized negotiations with Lee's descendants on the film rights. In July 2009, it was announced that Ip Man 2 would focus on a young Bruce Lee, prior to Lee becoming Ip Man's most famed disciple. The sequel continues Ip Man's story, focusing on his move to Hong Kong as he attempts to propagate Wing Chun in the region.

=== Casting ===
Several cast members from Ip Man reprise their respective roles in the sequel. Donnie Yen reprises his role as Ip; Lynn Hung reprises her role as Cheung Wing-sing, Ip's wife, who is now pregnant with their second child. To prepare for her role in the film, Hung asked producers for a 10-pound prosthetic belly to portray the feeling of being pregnant. Hung stated that the difficulty of her role lay in playing someone who goes from "a naive and simple-minded young woman to a strong, understanding and supportive adult." Fan Siu-Wong reprises his role as Jin Shanzhao, Ip's aggressive rival in the first film. In the sequel, Jin attempts to retire from the martial arts world by becoming an ordinary citizen; he later befriends Ip. In a cameo appearance, Simon Yam reprises his role as Ip's friend Chow Ching-chuen, who is now a mentally disabled beggar. Li Chak reprises his role as Ip Chun, Ip and Wing-sing's son.

Sammo Hung was announced as part of the cast in April 2009. Apart from serving as the film's martial arts choreographer, Hung appears as Hung Chun-nam, a master of the southern Chinese martial art of Hung Ga. In August 2009, it was announced that Huang Xiaoming would be playing Wong Leung, a supporting character based on Wong Shun Leung, one of Ip Man's disciples and the person responsible for mentoring Bruce Lee. Former child star Ashton Chen was also announced to be playing a disciple. Veteran actor Kent Cheng also has a supporting role in the film. To Yu-hang, who had a supporting role in the first film, appears in the sequel as a different character named Cheng Wai-kei. Cheng is a gang leader practicing Hung Ga, who decides to exact revenge on Wong after Wong defeats Cheng in a fight. Wilson Yip commented on the casting of the veteran actors as being "a form of tribute to old school kungfu movies."

Yen and Yip reportedly conducted a worldwide casting call for a suitable candidate to play Lee, who is Ip Man's most celebrated disciple. The film briefly portrays Lee at the age of 10. Yip and Yen debated over whether to look for an actor with a solid martial arts foundation or looks. Among the 1300 Mainland Chinese candidates auditioning for the role, Yip narrowed the casting call to two possible candidates: 10-year-old Jiang Dai Yan from Henan and 12-year-old Pan Run Kang from Heilongjiang. On 10 August 2009, it was announced that Jiang Dai Yan would be playing the role of a 10-year-old Bruce Lee. While the Bruce Lee character makes a brief appearance in the film, director Wilson Yip has expressed interest in making a third film that will focus on the relationship between Ip and Lee. Yen, however, has stated his lack of interest in making a third film, feeling that Ip Man 2 will "become a classic."

In November 2008, Yip revealed that there would be another actor appearing in the film, a martial artist who has been a fan of Donnie Yen. Yip commented, "I can only say that he fights even more vehemently than Sammo Hung." However, in February 2010, it was revealed that British actor and stunt performer Darren Shahlavi would have a supporting role as a boxing opponent fighting against Ip Man. Yip later stated that Shahlavi's character "has his own drama. He is also a personage, not just some random foreign guy that appears from nowhere for the sake of getting beaten up, like you see in other films." Other cast members include Ngo Ka-nin and Kelvin Cheng.

=== Writing and story ===
The filmmakers stated that while Ip Man was about survival, Ip Man 2 is about living. The sequel is set in Hong Kong in 1949, when the city was under British colonial rule. Screenwriter Edmond Wong stated that the film also explorers "how Hong Kong people were treated under British colonial rule, and Western attitudes concerning Chinese kung fu".

Wilson Yip stated that Ip Man 2 is a much better film than its predecessor in terms of characterization and storyline. The film focuses on disputes between the disciples of Hung Ga and Wing Chun martial arts, as well as the conflict and rivalry of the two practitioners. Wing Chun, as taught by Ip Man, is being viewed as a martial art meant only for girls; Hung Ga, as taught by Hung Chun-nam, is being seen as a macho form of boxing. Of the two characters, Yip commented, "Sammo Hung's character is not exactly villainous, but he's very overbearing, just like his torrential Hung Ga. In contrast, Ip Man is very unassuming, much like his fist." Yip also stated that the film has some moments of "family drama", such as the ongoing conflict between Ip and his wife Wing-Sing.

=== Filming ===
Prior to filming, a production ceremony for Ip Man 2 was held in Foshan, receiving plenty of media coverage. Principal photography began on 11 August 2009; filming took place in a sound stage at Songjiang Studios in Shanghai. On 28 October 2009, reporters were invited to the set to view the anticipated duel between Donnie Yen and Sammo Hung as it was being filmed. Filming ended on 8 November 2009.

=== Stunts and choreography ===
The film's martial arts sequences were choreographed by Sammo Hung, who also worked on the choreography for the first film. Prior to principal photography, Hung had undergone a major cardiac surgery. When he returned to the set, his dramatic scenes in the film were filmed first, with his fight sequences being filmed last. Hung performed his own stunts in the film, which led to him receiving several injuries during filming. While filming a scene, Hung was struck in the face by co-star Darren Shahlavi. He insisted on completing the shoot before going to the hospital. Not wanting his injuries to hinder the production progress, Hung spent five hours trying to complete the scene before going to the hospital for four stitches. After the completion of filming, Hung expressed that he was dissatisfied with the fight sequences involving his character, presumably due to his heart condition. He also stated that he plans to challenge Yen in a future film: "Although I'm the martial arts choreographer, our moves were all rather regulated, being confined by the script. So, I made a pact with Donnie Yen to have a rematch next year if the opportunity arises."

Huang Xiaoming prepared for his role by learning Wing Chun martial arts. He turned his hotel room into a gym, practicing with weights and a wooden dummy. Huang received multiple bruises on his arms, due to his frequent practices on the dummy. Huang would also spend time practicing with the film's stunt team, under Jun Gao. Wilson Yip praised his performance in the film, stating that Huang "may not be a martial artist, but he specially ordered a wooden dummy, and trained daily at home. In the end, he is doing the action scenes better than Hiroyuki Ikeuchi in the first film."

=== Film title ===
The Chinese title of the film (traditional Chinese: 葉問2:宗師傳奇; simplified Chinese: 叶问2:宗师传奇) literally means Ip Man 2: Legend of a Grandmaster. The title is a play on the first film's working title which was Grandmaster Ip Man, a title that was changed when Wong Kar-wai clashed with producers while trying to make his own Ip Man biopic. Wilson Yip explained that the title of the film was coincidental rather than intentional: "The sequel is about Ip Man being elevated from a master, a hero to a grandmaster, so we have 'grandmaster' in the title." Wong Kar-wai's film, titled The Grandmaster, was released in January 2013.

== Release ==
Ip Man 2 was released in select Asian countries and in Australia on 29 April 2010. Prior to its release, Mandarin Films publicly launched the film's official website in Beijing on 6 April 2010. The film held a premiere press conference in Beijing on 21 April 2010, only seven days after the 2010 Yushu earthquake. Guests were asked to wear dark-colored clothing in show of mourning; there was a moment of silence for the victims of the disaster. The film's cast, Donnie Yen, Sammo Hung, Huang Xiaoming, Lynn Hung, and Kent Cheng attended the premiere, and donated a total of ¥500,000 (US$73,200) to relief efforts helping in the disaster recovery. The film held private screenings in Chengdu on 21 April 2010, and in China on 27 April 2010, receiving positive reactions from audiences.

Mandarin Films sold North American distribution rights for the film to distributor Well Go USA, and Ip Man 2 was released in the United States by Variance Films on 28 January 2011.

=== Box office ===
In Hong Kong, Ip Man 2 faced competition with the international release of Iron Man 2, which premiered in Hong Kong one day later than Ip Man 2. During its opening weekend, Ip Man 2 grossed HK$13 million (US$1,736,011), surpassing Ip Man's opening weekend gross of HK$4.5 million (US$579,715). The sequel claimed first place at the box office, grossing HK$1 million more than Iron Man 2. The film's revenues decreased by 28.1% in its second weekend, earning HK$9,719,603.56 (US$1,248,996) to remain in first place. The film dropped 45.7% in its third week, bringing in HK$5,293,401 (US$678,613) while still remaining in first place. Ip Man 2 continued to stay at number one at the box office, dropping an additional 39.4% in its fourth week and grossing HK$3,199,567 (US$411,115). During its fifth week, the film moved to fifth place at 79.3%, grossing HK$664,535 (US$85,325). Ip Man 2 grossed HK$43,268,228.72 (US$5,558,704) domestically. The sequel's domestic gross in Hong Kong puts it ahead of Ip Man's total box office gross of HK$25,581,958.69 (US$3,300,847).

Ip Man 2 also broke box office records in Singapore. The film was the highest-grossing Hong Kong film to be released in the country, beating a five-year record held by Kung Fu Hustle. On its opening weekend Ip Man 2 came in second place behind Iron Man 2, grossing SG$1.74 million (US$1,264,919). The film's opening weekend gross surpassed Ip Man's 2008 weekend gross of SG$827,000 (US$463,946).

In total, Ip Man 2 has grossed US$49,721,954 worldwide during its theatrical run.

=== Performance analysis ===
Analysts believed that Ip Man 2's box office success was related to the favorable reputation and popularity of its first installment. Huang Qunfei, a general manager of the Chinese theater chain New Film Association Company, made notice of Chinese viewers preferring films made domestically over ones made in Hollywood: "Chinese viewers are less obsessed with Hollywood blockbusters than before. Finally, it is the film's quality that matters. With a good story, local films are likely to win more favor among audiences." Liu Wei of China Daily noted that the film's finale was similar to its competition against Iron Man 2 at the box office: "The hero of Ip Man 2...faces up to a Western boxer and knocks him out. Off screen, it is a similar story."

Analysts also predicted that Mandarin Films' hopes of having the sequel gross over ¥300 million in China was unlikely, due to competition with other films such as Iron Man 2. Another factor was that the illegal recording, downloading and file sharing of the film would cause a potential loss in revenue. A pirated version was released online, one week after the film's release in China, and attracted more than 10 million online users. Raymond Wong publicly expressed that he would be pursuing legal action against the originator of the illegal downloads.

In the first half of the year 2010 (from 1 January to 30 June 2010), Ip Man 2 was the highest grossing Hong Kong film to be released in the country. However, when compared to films produced outside of Asia, the highest-grossing foreign film was Alice in Wonderland with HK$44 million.

=== Critical reception ===
The review aggregator website Rotten Tomatoes reported that 97% of critics have given Ip Man 2 a positive review based on 29 reviews, with an average rating of 6.92/10. At Metacritic, the film has a weighted average score of 67 out of 100 based on 13 critics, indicating "generally favorable reviews".

Singaporean film critic Genevieve Loh of Channel NewsAsia wrote, "Ip Man 2 delivers. Perhaps not as action-packed with dignified choreography as showcased by its excellent predecessor, this installment is nonetheless still exciting, if a tad one-dimensional." James Marsh of Twitch Film praised the film, writing, "Ip Man 2 looks fantastic and does a grand job of evoking the period authentically, lending the film a much-appreciated sense of dramatic gravitas." Joy Fang, a critic for online news portal AsiaOne wrote, "While not as big a movie as the first one, which focuses on heartbreaking and intense issues arising from the Japanese occupation in China, this film evokes Chinese pride with its strong cultural roots." Ho Yi, of the Taipei Times wrote, "Despite its plot holes, the Ip Man series has potential and recalls the 1990s' Once Upon a Time in China franchise starring Jet Li." Amir Hafizi of The Malay Mail praised Sammo Hung's martial arts choreography: "With fluid movements intricate interplay between contrasting martial styles and gorgeous sequences, kung fu fans will definitely get their eye-balls' worth here as this time around, the introduction of Western boxing into the mix makes for some interesting choreography." Roger Ebert of the Chicago Sun-Times awarded Ip Man 2 three stars out of four, writing, "In its direct and sincere approach, it's a rebuke to the frenzied editing that reduces so many recent action movies into incomprehensible confusion."

Darcy Paquet of Screen Daily had mixed opinions of the film. He wrote that the film's performances and fight sequences "should ensure decent theatrical runs." Paquet concluded his review by writing, "Ultimately, the film's energy and humour overcome cartoonishly bad performances from the British actors and an utter lack of surprises in the final two reels." Amanda Foo of The UrbanWire awarded the film two stars out of five, writing in her review, "It's no surprise that Donnie Yen isn't willing to sign up for any more Ip Man movies, with the shameless repetition that is happening in these films, even the most ardent fan would be tired." Matt Prigge of Metro New York stated in 2016, "There are gobs of films about Ip Man [...] Of these, the three films starring Donnie Yen are the trashiest; the second one is basically a remake of Rocky IV."

=== Home media ===
In Hong Kong, Ip Man 2 was released on DVD, and Blu-ray Disc formats on 25 June 2010. Releases include a single-disc edition and a two-disc special edition on DVD Features for the special edition DVD, as well as the Blu-ray disc, include deleted scenes, several theatrical trailers, cast and crew interviews, a making-of featurette, coverage of the film's gala premiere, and a shooting diary.

Coinciding with the sequel's home video release, both Ip Man and Ip Man 2 were released as a double feature on DVD and Blu-ray Disc. Releases include two-disc special editions of both feature films with a total of four discs on DVD, as well as a standard DVD edition featuring both films with a total of two discs.

In the United Kingdom, Ip Man 2 was 2011's sixth best-selling foreign-language film on physical home video formats, and the best-selling Chinese film (above the original Ip Man at number seven).

== Sequel ==
The third installment began filming in 2015. Edmond Wong, Raymond Wong and Wilson Yip returns as screenwriter, producer and director again, respectively. Donnie Yen reprises his role as "Ip Man". In March 2015, The Hollywood Reporter announced that principal photography began; they also revealed that Mike Tyson has been cast in a role and Bruce Lee is portrayed by Danny Chan, reprising the role from The Legend of Bruce Lee.

== See also ==
- List of martial arts films
