= Butterfly sword =

Chinese single-edged blade

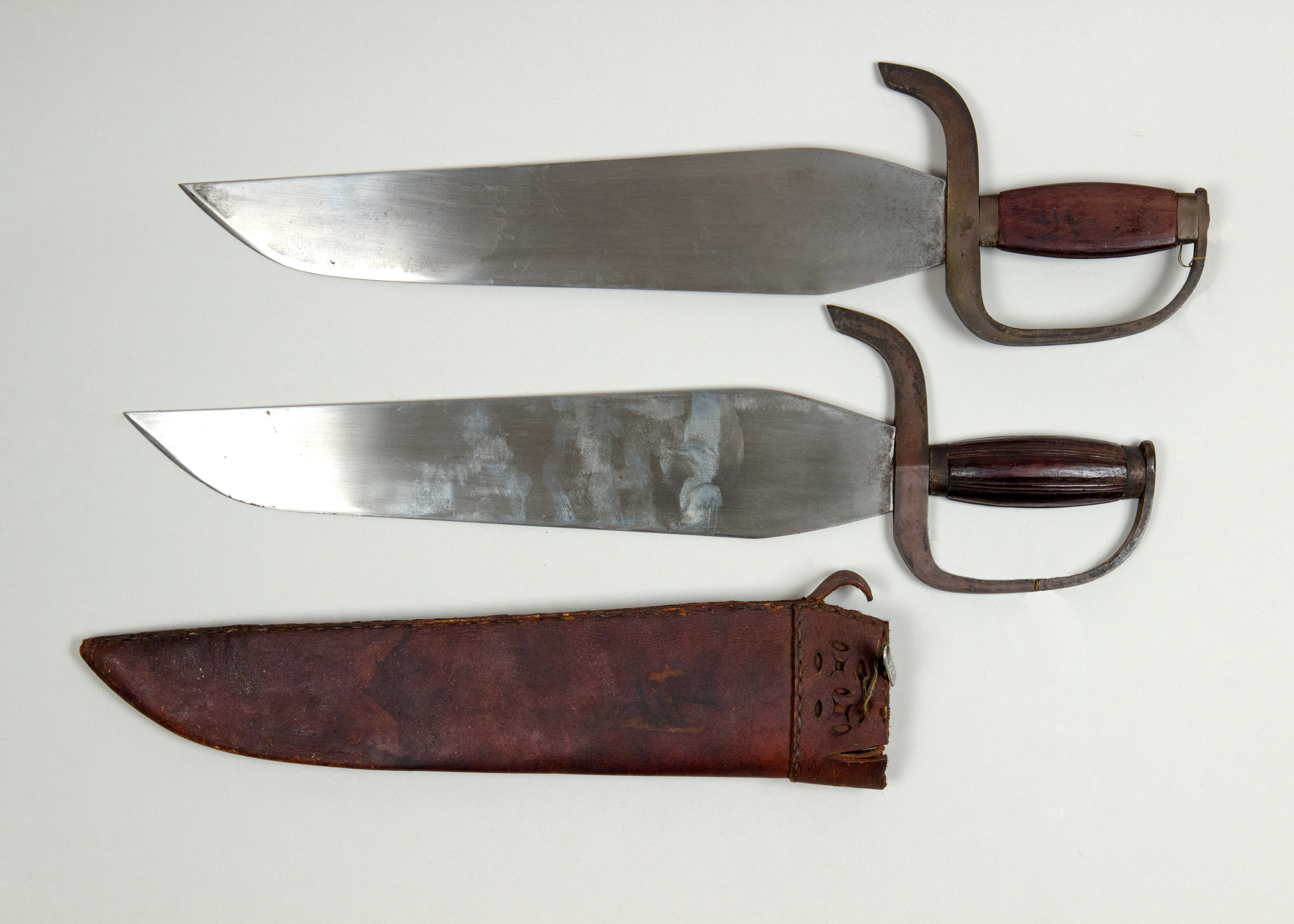
- A pair of butterfly swords from the 19th century.
- Traditional Chinese: 蝴蝶雙刀
- Simplified Chinese: 蝴蝶双刀
- Literal meaning: butterfly double sword
Transcriptions
Standard Mandarin
- Hanyu Pinyin: húdié shuāngdāo

The butterfly sword is a short dao, or single-edged sword, originally from southern China, though it has also seen use in the north. It is thought that butterfly swords date from the early 19th century. Several English language accounts from the 1840s describe local militia in Guangdong being trained in the "double swords", short swords with a hook extending from the guard, and fitting into a single scabbard.

The blade of a butterfly sword is roughly as long as a human forearm, which allows easy concealment inside loose sleeves or boots, and allows greater maneuverability when spinning and rotating during close-quarters fighting. Butterfly swords are usually wielded in pairs. A pair of swords will often be carried side by side within the same scabbard, so as to give the appearance of a single weapon.

The butterfly sword has a small crossguard to protect the hands of the wielder, similar to that of a sai, which can also be used to block or hook an opponent's weapon. In some versions the crossguard is enlarged offering a second handhold, held in this position the swords can be manipulated in a manner akin to a pair of tonfa. They may also be used as brass knuckles when non-lethal application of the weapon is desired.

Traditionally, the blade of a butterfly sword is only sharpened along half of its edge – from the middle of the blade to the tip; this can be seen in all vintage specimens from the Qing dynasty. The blade from the midpoint down is left blunt so that it can be used to deliver non-lethal strikes and to block without damaging the sharpened edge. Butterflies were generally commissioned for individual martial artists, not mass-produced, so every set of swords is different; however, an average blade today is about 11.5 in (29 cm) long with a 6 in (15 cm) handle.

== Other terms ==
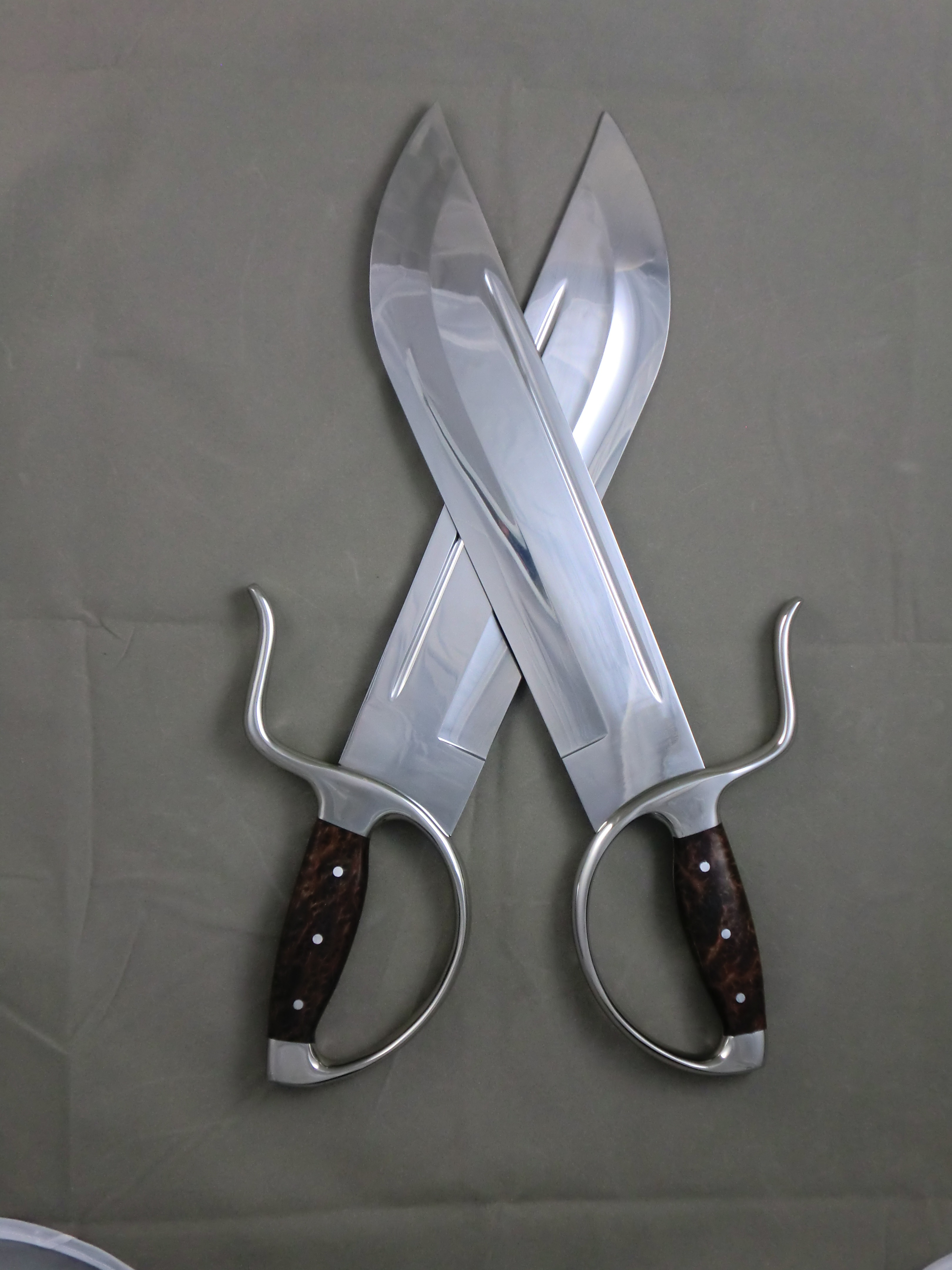

Butterfly swords are usually called 'butterfly knives' in English. However, they should not be confused with the folding balisong, which is also commonly called a butterfly knife. The Chinese word dao is used to designate any blade whose primary function is to cut and slash regardless of length. In some branches of Kung Fu, such as Wing Chun, butterfly knives are known as Baat Jaam Do (named after the system's form, literally 'Eight Chopping/Slashing Knives' in Cantonese).

== Use ==
Butterfly swords are used in several Chinese martial arts, notably Wing Chun, Hung Ga, and Choy Li Fut. In Wing Chun, one notable aspect of butterfly sword combat is that its principles are the basis for all other weaponry. In theory, any object that can be held in the hands of a Wing Chun practitioner will follow the same basic principles of movement as the butterfly swords. This is because the use of butterfly swords is simply an extension of empty-handed combat.

The design of the weapon, including the quillon (crossguard) shape, blade profile and blade length, are specific to each style of martial arts, the precise lineage, and individual. For example, some martial arts lineages flip the butterfly swords between the forward and reverse grip like a Sai; they consequently need a quillon that will fit the hand during a reverse grip. Some lineages trap the opponent's staff or blade between the quillon and spine, and they need a longer quillon closer and more parallel to the spine than would fit a hand after flipping. Some schools like a hybrid quillon design that is adequate for both flipping and trapping but optimal for neither.

Some butterfly swords had a long narrow blade that emphasized stabbing. While a deadly stabbing blade with a sharpened point—known as a "Red Boat" knife—was used by Chinese revolutionaries in the Wing Chun lineage, modern Wing Chun practitioners tend to prefer a blade profile with a wider belly that emphasizes chopping and slashing. Wing Chun lore attributes this to the desire of Monks to maim rather than kill. These knives generally have a quarter circle style tip suitable only for chopping/slashing and not stabbing or a shallower curve to a more pointed tip that will accommodate both.

The appropriate length of the blade depends on a combination of the lineage and individual. For a Hung Gar stylist, the length should be a few inches past the elbow when the knife is held in a reverse grip. Wing Chun schools that use techniques which twirl the knives inside the arm need a reverse grip blade length based on the distance to the interior of the bicep. Other Wing Chun schools measure to the outside of the bicep.
