= Wing Chun =

Chinese martial art

- Focus: Striking, grappling, trapping
- Country of origin: Foshan, China
- Creator: No definitive founder has been identified; there are eight distinct lineages with different stories regarding its conception. For further information, see Branches of Wing Chun
- Famous practitioners: (see notable practitioners)
- Parenthood: Shaolin Kung Fu / Nanquan
- Descendant arts: Jeet Kune Do, German Jujutsu (Note: Wing Chun techniques were added to the German Jujutsu curriculum in 2000. Prior to that, German Jujutsu did not contain Wing Chun techniques.)

Wing Chun
- Traditional Chinese: 詠春
- Simplified Chinese: 咏春
- Literal meaning: "singing spring"
Transcriptions
Standard Mandarin
- Hanyu Pinyin: Yǒngchūn
- IPA: [jʊ̀ŋ.ʈʂwə́n]
Yue: Cantonese
- Jyutping: Wing6 ceon1
- IPA: [wɪŋ˨.tsʰɵn˥]

Wing Chun (Cantonese) or Yong Chun (Mandarin) (traditional Chinese: 詠春; simplified Chinese: 咏春, lit. "singing spring") is a concept-based martial art, a form of Southern Chinese kung fu, and a close-quarters system of self-defense. It is a martial arts style characterized by its focus on close-quarters hand-to-hand combat, rapid-fire punches, and straightforward efficiency. It has a philosophy that emphasizes capturing and sticking to an opponent's centerline. This is accomplished using simultaneous attack and defense, tactile sensitivity, and using an opponent's force against them.

Wing Chun has various spellings in the West, but "Wing Chun" is the most common. The origins of Wing Chun are uncertain, but it is generally attributed to the development of Southern Chinese martial arts. There are at least eight distinct lineages, of which the Ip Man and Yuen Kay-shan lineages are the most prolific.

The martial art was brought to Hong Kong and then the rest of the world by Ip Man, with Bruce Lee being his most famous student. The Ving Tsun Athletic Association, founded in 1967 by Ip Man and his students, helped spread Wing Chun globally. Traditionally taught within a family system, modern Wing Chun lessons have taken on a more academic and commercial character.

Wing Chun gained popularity in the 2010s due to the Ip Man film series starring Donnie Yen and has been featured in video games like Tekken 7. Notable practitioners include Bruce Lee, Donnie Yen, Samuel Kwok, and Carlos Deleon.

== Etymology ==
In Chinese, this martial art is referred to as 咏春拳 (simplified script) or 詠春拳 (traditional script). Though it is written in an almost identical way in traditional and simplified, it is not pronounced and transcribed in the same way according to the regions and their dialects: Yǒngchūn quán in Mandarin pinyin, Wing-Chun keen in Cantonese Wade–Giles. It is made up of two terms: 拳 (quan/kuen) which means "fist, boxing" and the term 詠春 (wing-chun, in Cantonese) meaning "singing spring". The full name is thus translated as "singing spring boxing".

In its short designation, the martial art is simply designated by these two sinograms:

- the sinogram 詠 yǒng/wing: "to sing, to chant..."
- the sinogram 春 chūn/chun: "spring, vitality..."

This martial art is sometimes referred to by 永春, characters different from 詠春, but pronounced and transcribed in the same way: They are literally translated as "eternal spring", the character 永 meaning "eternal, endless". These characters also designate the Yongchun region near the city of Quanzhou (Fujian).

If the use of 詠春 seems privileged today for Wing Chun styles, 永春 still appears in the name of other Southern Chinese martial arts (with 永春 often transcribed Weng Chun); for example jee shim weng chun and Yǒng Chūn Bái Hè Quán (永春白鶴拳).

=== Romanization ===
In the West, the name of this martial art has been transcribed variably due to the use of different or personal Chinese language romanization methods, and differences in pronunciation between Chinese languages (but Cantonese was often preferred) or according to Western languages. In addition, some Wing Chun masters voluntarily created their own terms, in order to dissociate their personal teaching from traditional teachings. For example, Yip Man's Ving Tsun or Leung Ting's Wing Tsun.

The consequence is the ability to determine a lineage, a student-teacher family tree, just by spelling.

— Wayne Belonoha

Finally, this martial art is pronounced quite identically in the West but is written with many spellings: Ving Tsun, Wing Tsun, Wing Tsung, Yong Chun, Weng Chun, Wyng Tjun, Ving Tjun, Wing Tzun, Wing Tschun. Wing Chun is the most common form, used to apply to all lineages of this martial art.

=== Context ===
Context of the name Wing Chun varies between various branches of Wing Chun. Common legend is that the name is derived from Yim Wing-chun, the mythical progenator of the martial art, who was a student of the legendary Abbess Ng Mui.

According to the Hung Suen / Hung Gu Biu lineage, the Ng Mui / Yim Wing Chun legend was conceived to protect the identity of Cheung Ng, a Shaolin monk who survived the Manchurian massacres and took refuge at Red Boat Opera. The "Yim Wing Chun" name was chosen for specific reasons, as Yim could be understood as the word for "Secret" or "Protected", and "Wing Chun" refers to Siu Lam Wing Chun Tong (the Always Spring Hall). With "Yim Wing Chun" being a secret code for "the secret art of Siu Lam Wing Chun Hall."

In the Pan Nam lineage, the "Wing" in Wing Chun comes from Chan Wing-wah, one of the founders of Hongmen. According to the Pao Fa Lien lineage, the name Wing Chun is a shortened form of the revolutionary motto, "Wing yun chi jee; Mo mong Hon Juk; Dai dei wu chun." A secret code that allowed the anti-Qing revolutionaries to recognize each other. Eventually, the codeword was shortened to Wing Chun (Always Spring.)

== Origins ==
The definitive origin of Wing Chun remains unknown and is attributed to the development of Southern Chinese martial arts. Complications in the history and documentation of Wing Chun are attributed to the art being passed from teacher to student orally, rather than in writing. Another reason is the secrecy of its development, due to its connections to anti-Qing rebellious movements.

There are at least eight different distinct lineages of Wing Chun, each having its own history of origin. Additionally, there are competing genealogies within the same branch or about the same individual teacher. The eight distinct lineages of Wing Chun which have been identified are:

- Ip Man
- Yuen Kay-shan
- Gu Lao Village
- Nanyang / Cao Dean
- Pan Nam
- Pao Fa Lien
- Hung Suen / Hung Gu Biu
- Jee Shim / Weng Chun

Regardless of the origins espoused by various Wing Chun branches and lineages, there is much third-party controversy and speculative theorizing regarding the true origins of Wing Chun. In the West, Wing Chun's history has become a mix of fact and fiction due to the impacts of early secrecy and modern marketing.

== Modern Wing Chun ==
Of the eight Wing Chun lineages, the Ip Man and Yuen Kay-shan lineages are the most prolific branches of Wing Chun worldwide. The other lineages are virtually unknown outside of China, except for the Pan Nam line, which survives in the USA and the Jee Shim / Weng Chun line with a strong presence in Germany. The Yuen Chai Wan form of Wing Chun (Note: Chu, Ritchie and Wu consider this a derivative of his brother's, Yuen Kay-shan's Wing Chun. With Leung Ting also seeing this as a niche system.) has a notable presence in Vietnam, with this lineage having earned the moniker of "Vietnamese Wing Chun".

In 1949, Ip Man, considered the most important grandmaster of modern Wing Chun, brought the style from China to Hong Kong and eventually to the rest of the world. Yip Man's most famous student was Bruce Lee, who had studied under Yip Man before he moved to the United States. (Note: Lee was mainly taught Wing Chun by Wong Shun-leung, a senior student of Ip Man.) Lee is also credited for popularizing Wing Chun internationally, although he would later develop his own martial arts philosophies (namely Jeet Kune Do) that contain many Wing Chun influences. Some masters changed the tradition of teaching only one student: that was due to the Qing dynasty's influence, and the destruction of Southern Shaolin schools. In order to preserve their school's style, masters taught only a single loyal student.

=== The Ving Tsun Athletic Association ===
The Ving Tsun Athletic Association was founded in 1967 by Cantonese master Ip Man and seven of his senior students, so they could teach Wing Chun together and Ip Man would not take on all the work himself. The first public demonstration of the Wing Chun fighting system, according to Ip Man, took place in Hong Kong at an official exhibition fight in the winter of 1969 at what was then the Baptist College (now the Hong Kong Baptist University). Leung Ting, a student of Ip Man, invited his master and some well-known representatives of the martial arts scene of the time to the college and conducted the exhibition fights in front of a specialist audience. The Association helped Wing Chun to spread to the rest of the world.

=== International Wing Chun Organization (IWCO) ===
The International Wing Chun Organization (IWCO) was founded by Grandmaster Donald Mak in 1997, a respected Wing Chun practitioner and instructor who studied under the Great Grandmaster Chow Tze Chueng.

== Characteristics ==
=== General ===
Wing Chun puts emphasis on economic movement and encourages its practitioners to "feel" through their opponents' defenses and to utilize the incoming attacks with parrying, deflection, rapid punches, and finger pokes. Slapping and defensive maneuvers are used to distract the opponent to make them shift their defenses away from their centerline.

Wing Chun favors a relatively high, narrow stance with the elbows close to the body. Within the stance, arms are generally positioned across the vital points of the centerline with hands in a vertical "wu sau" ("protecting hand" position). This puts the practitioner in a position to make readily placed blocks and fast-moving blows to vital striking points down the center of the body, i.e. the neck, chest, belly, and groin. Shifting or turning within a stance is done on the heels, balls, or middle (K1 or Kidney point 1) of the foot, depending on the lineage. Some Wing Chun styles discourage the use of high kicks because this risks counter-attacks to the groin. The practice of "settling" one's opponent to brace them more effectively against the ground helps one deliver as much force as possible.

=== Relaxation ===
Softness (via relaxation) and performance of techniques in a relaxed and controlled manner. By training the physical, mental, breathing, energy, and force in a relaxed manner a "soft wholesome force" known as Chi is develop which is fundamental to Wing Chun. On "softness" in Wing Chun, Ip Man said during an interview:

Wing Chun is in some sense a "soft" school of martial arts. However, if one equates that word as weak or without strength, then they are dead wrong. Chi Sau in Wing Chun is to maintain one's flexibility and softness, all the while keeping in the strength to fight back, much like the flexible nature of bamboo".

== Forms ==
The most common system of forms in Wing Chun consists of three empty hand forms, two weapon forms: the Dragon pole and Butterfly swords, and a wooden dummy form.

=== Empty hand ===
==== Siu nim tau ====
The first and most important form in Wing Chun, siu nim tau (simplified Chinese: 小念头; traditional Chinese: 小念頭; pinyin: xiǎo niàn tou; Jyutping: siu2 nim6 tau4; lit. 'little idea for beginning' (Note: "Nim Lik (念力)" is literally translated as "Idea Power" in CHU's 2011 book)), is practiced throughout the practitioner's lifetime. It is the foundation or "seed" of the art, on which all succeeding forms and techniques are based. Fundamental rules of balance and body structure are developed here. Using a car analogy; for some branches this would provide the chassis and for others, this is the engine. It serves as the basic alphabet of the system. Some branches view the symmetrical stance as the fundamental fighting stance, while others see it as a training stance used in developing technique.

Although many of the movements are similar, siu nim tau varies significantly between the different branches of Wing Chun. In Ip Man's Wing Chun, the first section of the form is done by training the basic power for the hand techniques by tensing and relaxing the arms. In Moy Yat's Wing Chun, the first section of the form is done without muscle tension and slowly in a meditative, calm, and being "in the moment" way. In 1972, weeks before he died, Ip Man demonstrated Siu Nim Tau (also known as Siu Lim Tau) on film, showing how the form is to be performed.

==== Chum kiu ====
The second form, chum kiu simplified Chinese: 寻桥; traditional Chinese: 尋橋; pinyin: xún qiáo; Jyutping: cham4 kiu4; lit. 'seeking the bridge', focuses on coordinated movement of body mass and entry techniques to "bridge the gap" between practitioner and opponent, and move in to disrupt their structure and balance. Close-range attacks using the elbows and knees are also developed here. It also teaches methods of recovering position and centerline when in a compromised position where Siu Nim Tau structure has been lost. For some branches, bodyweight in striking is a central theme, either from pivoting (rotational) or stepping (translational). Likewise, for some branches, this form provides the engine to the car. For branches that use the "sinking bridge" interpretation, the form has more emphasis on "uprooting", adding multi-dimensional movement and spiraling to the already developed engine.

==== Biu jee ====
The third and last form, biu jee Chinese: 镖指; pinyin: biāo zhǐ; Jyutping: biu1 ji2; lit. 'darting fingers', is composed of extreme short-range and extreme long-range techniques, low kicks and sweeps, and "emergency techniques" to counter-attack when structure and centerline have been seriously compromised, such as when the practitioner is seriously injured., As well as the pivoting and stepping developed in Chum Kiu, a third degree of freedom, involves more upper body, and stretching is developed for more power. Such movements include close-range elbow strikes and finger thrusts to the throat. For some branches, this is the turbo-charger of the car; for others, it can be seen as a "pit stop" kit that should never come into play, recovering your "engine" when it has been lost. Still, other branches view this form as imparting deadly "killing" and maiming techniques that should never be used without good reason. A common Wing Chun saying is, "Biu jee doesn't go out the door". Some interpret this to mean the form should be kept secret; others interpret it as meaning it should never be used if you can help it.

=== Wooden dummy ===
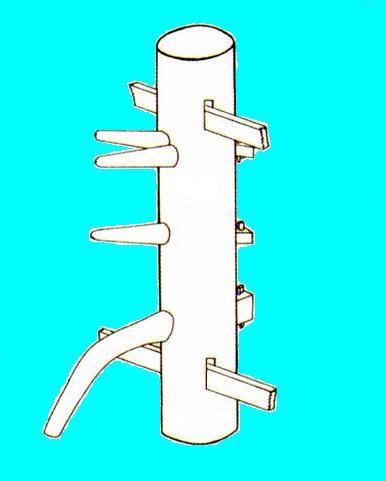

Mu ren zhuang (simplified Chinese: 木人桩; traditional Chinese: 木人樁; pinyin: mù rén zhuāng; Jyutping: muk6 yan4 jong1; lit. 'wooden dummy') is performed on a wooden dummy, which serves as a training tool to teach the student the use of Wing Chun Kuen's 108 movements against a live opponent. There are many versions of this form which come from a variety of Wing Chun Kung Fu lineages.

The Star Dummy consists of three poles that are embedded into the ground in a triangle with each pole an arm's span apart. The associated form consists of kicking the poles using the various kicks found in Wing Chun: front kick, front kick with the foot pointed out using the broad area of the foot and knee rotation to outside, and sidekick.

=== Weapons ===
==== Baat Jaam Dou (八斬刀) ====
Baat Jaam Dou (simplified Chinese: 八斩刀; traditional Chinese: 八斬刀; Cantonese Yale: Baat Jáam Dōu; pinyin: Bā Zhǎn Dāo; lit. 'Eight Way Chopping Knives'), also known as Yee Jee Seung Do (simplified Chinese: 二字双刀; traditional Chinese: 二字雙刀; Cantonese Yale: Yih Jih Sēung Dōu; pinyin: èr zì shuāng dāo; lit. 'Parallel Shape Double Knives').

A form involving a pair of butterfly knives. Historically the knives were also referred to as Dit Ming Do ('Life-taking knives'). The Baat Jaam Do form and training methods teach advanced footwork and develop additional power and strength in both stance and technique. The Baat Jaam Do also help to cultivate a fighting spirit, as the techniques are designed for combat.

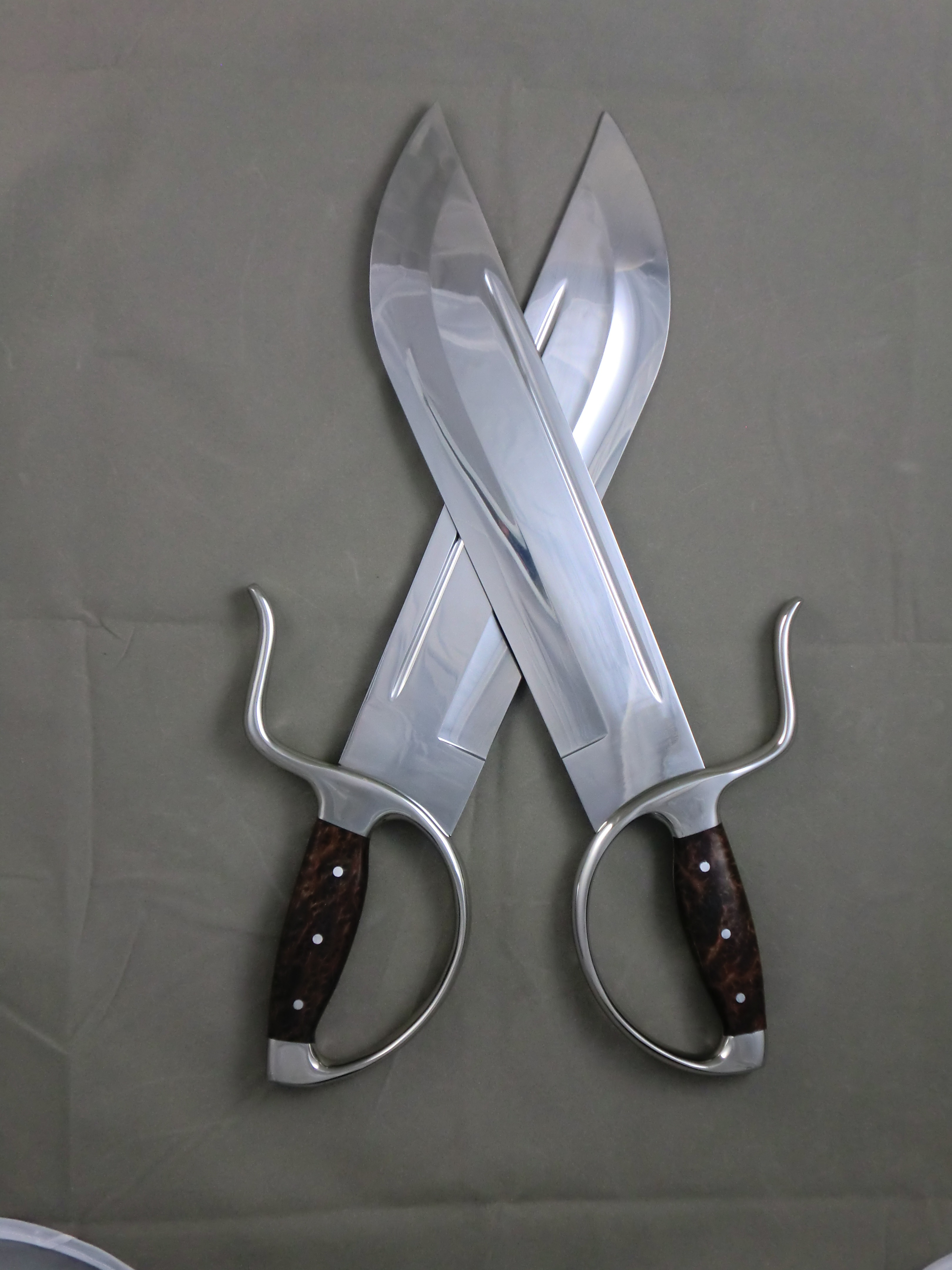
Modern hybrid-blade-style Wing Chun butterfly swords

==== Luk Dim Bun Gwan (六點半棍) ====
Luk Dim Bun Gwan (simplified Chinese: 六点半棍; traditional Chinese: 六點半棍; Cantonese Yale: Luhk Dím Bun Gwan; pinyin: Liù Diǎn Bàn Gùn; lit. 'Six and A Half Point Pole')

"Long Pole"— a tapered wooden pole ranging anywhere from 8 to 13 feet in length. Also referred to as "dragon pole" by some branches. For some branches that use "Six and A Half Point Pole", their 7 principles of Luk Dim Boon Gwun (Tai-uprooting, lan-to expand, dim-shock, kit-deflect, got-cut down, wan-circle, lau-flowing) are used in unarmed combat as well. The name six and a half point pole comes from these 7 principles, with the last principle, Lau (or Flowing), counting as half a point.

==== Other ====
The Yuen Kay Shan / Sum Nung branch also historically trained to throw darts (Biu).

=== Other forms ===
San Sik (Chinese: 散式; Cantonese Yale: Sáan Sīk; pinyin: Sǎn Shì; 'Separate forms'), along with the other three forms, is the basis of all Wing Chun techniques. They are compact in structure, and can be loosely grouped into three broad categories: (1) Focus on building body structure through basic punching, standing, turning, and stepping drills; (2) Fundamental arm cycles and changes, firmly ingraining the cardinal tools for interception and adaptation; (3) Sensitivity training and combination techniques.

=== Sensitivity Training ===
Wing Chun includes several sensitivity drills. Although they can be practiced or expressed in a combat form, they should not be confused with actual sparring or fighting.

==== Chi Sau ====
Chi Sau (Chinese: 黐手; Cantonese Yale: Chī Sáu; pinyin: Chī Shǒu; lit. 'sticking hands') is a term for the principle and drills used for the development of automatic reflexes upon contact and the idea of "sticking" to the opponent (also known as "sensitivity training"). In reality, the intention is not to "stick" to your opponent at all costs, but rather to protect your centerline while simultaneously attacking your opponent's centerline. In Wing Chun, this is practiced by two practitioners maintaining contact with each other's forearms while executing techniques, thereby training each other to sense changes in body mechanics, pressure, momentum and "feel". The increased sensitivity gained from this drill helps a practitioner attack and counter an opponent's movements precisely, quickly, and with appropriate techniques. The center-line principle is a core concept in Wing Chun Kung Fu. You want to protect your own center-line while controlling your opponent's. You do this with footwork. Understanding the center-line will allow you to instinctively know where your opponent is.

According to Ip Man, "Chi Sau in Wing Chun is to maintain one's feeling of opponent's movement by staying relaxed all the while keeping in the strength to fight back, much like the flexible nature of bamboo".

Chi Sau additionally refers to methods of rolling hands drills (Chinese: 碌手; Cantonese Yale: Lūk Sáu; lit. 'rolling hands'). Luk Sau participants push and "roll" their forearms against each other in a single circle while trying to remain in a relaxed form. The aim is to feel the force, test resistance, and find defensive gaps. Other branches have a version of this practice where each arm rolls in small, separate circles. Luk Sau is most notably taught within the Pan Nam branch of Wing Chun where both the larger rolling drills as well as the smaller, separate-hand circle drills are taught.

Some lineages, such as Ip Man and Jiu Wan, begin Chi Sau drills with one-armed sets called Daan Chi Sau (Chinese: 单黐手; Cantonese Yale: Dāan Chī Sáu; lit. 'Single Sticking Hand') which help the novice student to get the feel of the exercise. In Daan Chi Sau each practitioner uses one hand from the same side as they face each other.

==== Chi Geuk ====
Chi Geuk (simplified Chinese: 黐脚; traditional Chinese: 黐腳; Cantonese Yale: Chī Geuk; pinyin: Chī Jiǎo; lit. 'sticking legs') is the lower-body equivalent of the upper body's Chi Sau training, aimed at developing awareness in the lower body and obtaining relaxation of the legs.

== In film and popular culture ==
Sammo Hung directed two films about Wing Chun practitioner Leung Jan: Warriors Two (1978), in which Leung is played by Bryan Leung, and The Prodigal Son (1981), in which Leung is played by Yuen Biao.

Donnie Yen played the role of Wing Chun Grandmaster Ip Man in the 2008 movie Ip Man, and in its sequels Ip Man 2, Ip Man 3, and Ip Man 4. The Ip Man series of movies is credited for reviving interest in the martial art in the 2010s and the Ip Man trilogy received critical acclaim in the box office. Ip Man was Bruce Lee's master, which made the trilogy so popular. Lee was largely responsible for launching the "kung fu craze" of the 1970s.

For the 2008 American action thriller film Bangkok Dangerous, actor Nicolas Cage trained in Wing Chun extensively. A particular scene in the film shows Cage's skills whilst drilling moves with another Wing Chun practitioner (played by Thai actor Shahkrit Yamnam).

In December 2019, a new Wing Chun fighter named Leroy Smith was introduced to the fighting game Tekken 7 roster as downloadable content. When creating characters to represent real-world martial arts, the developers wanted to introduce a new fighter utilizing Wing Chun. The developers consulted a student of Ip Man's nephew, who provided motion capture for the character.

== See also ==
- Chinese martial arts
- Wing Chun terms
- Wushu
- List of films featuring Wing Chun

== Bibliography ==
- Chu, Robert; Ritchie, Rene; Wu, Y. (2015). The Definitive Guide to Wing Chun's History and Tradition. Tuttle Publishing. ISBN 978-1-4629-1753-2.
- Leung, Ting (2000). Roots and Branches of Wing Tsun, Second edition (January 1, 2000). Leung Ting Co, Hong Kong. ISBN 962-7284-23-8.
- Benjamin N. Judkins & Jon Nielson (2015). The Creation of Wing Chun: A Social History of the Southern Chinese Martial Arts. SUNY Press. ISBN 978-1-4384-5695-9.
