= Mu ren zhuang =

Dummy used in Chinese martial arts training

- Traditional Chinese: 木人樁
- Simplified Chinese: 木人桩
- Literal meaning: "wooden man post"
Transcriptions
Standard Mandarin
- Hanyu Pinyin: mù rén zhuāng
- Bopomofo: ㄇㄨˋ ㄖㄣˊ ㄓㄨㄤ
- Gwoyeu Romatzyh: muh ren juang
Yue: Cantonese
- Yale Romanization: muk6 yan4 jong1
- Jyutping: muk6 jan4 zong1

Mu ren zhuang (Chinese: 木人桩; pinyin: Mù Rén Zhuāng; lit. 'Wooden Man Post') or Cantonese: Muk Yan Chong (also known as The Wing-Chun Dummy or simply The Wooden Dummy internationally), is a training tool used in various styles of Chinese martial arts, most notably that of Wing Chun and other kung fu styles of Southern China. Traditionally made from wood, the dummies are now also made from synthetic materials such as steel and plastic.

== In Wing Chun ==
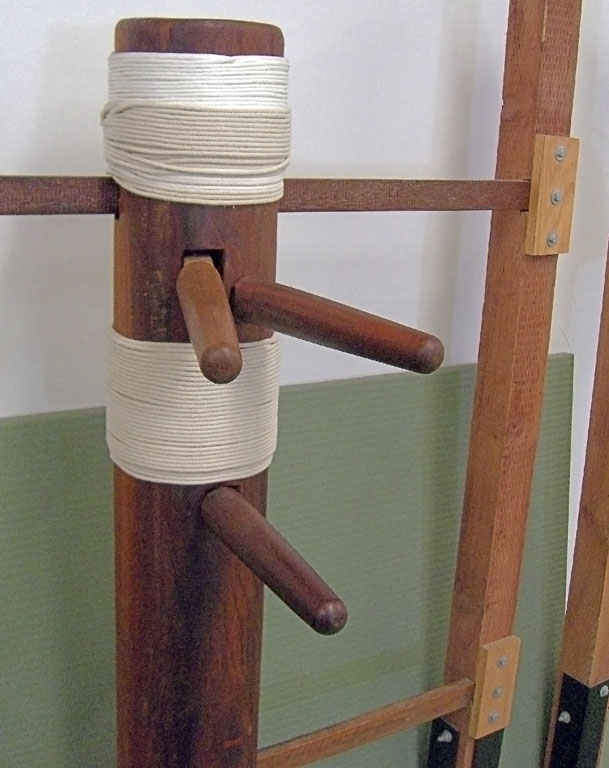
Wing Chun Dummy at a Wing Tsun school

The Wing Chun wooden dummy is the most popular form of wooden dummy. A popular legend says it came about when 108 separate wooden dummies from the Shaolin Temple were combined into one by the nun Ng Mui to make training more efficient and effective. The Wing Chun wooden dummy uses an arm and leg configuration designed to cultivate fighting skill and chi simultaneously. The Hong Kong wooden dummy is a wall mounted version of the Wing Chun Wooden Dummy that hangs using two wooden slats through the body of the wooden dummy. Older versions of the Wing Chun wooden dummy were originally placed in the ground. The modern design was created by Ip Man in Hong Kong to fit the needs of living in an apartment. The Wing Chun version of the muk yan jong has three arms and one leg, which represents an opponent's body in various positions and the lines of force the body can give out. The wooden slats on which the muk yan jong is mounted has a springiness that is similar to a human opponent's involuntary reaction and allows the user to practice absorbing energy into his/her stance. Due to this springiness, this type of dummy is considered an "alive" dummy. Therefore, the older version of the dummy without mounting is commonly called a "dead" dummy.

== In Jeet Kune Do ==
Bruce Lee, a student of Ip Man, had also made and modified a Wing Chun wooden dummy for his martial arts philosophy of Jeet Kune Do, which had a modified neck and a metal leg. Many of the principles of Wing Chun are central to Jeet Kune Do.

== In Choy Lee Fut ==
=== Ching Jong ===
Ching Jong (balanced dummy) has a different orientation to the arms more suited to Choy Lee Fut style's arm motions. In this version, the single top arm, protruding straight out from the front, moves up and down, anchored traditionally with a rope and heavy weight (the origin of the namesake) and anchored with a spring to the rear in modern times. Furthermore, the two middle arms now protrude outward in a "V", and also an additional lower arm that can be substitute with a traditional Wing Chun dummy's leg. Also, sandbags are mounted on the front and sides, which are struck for hand and finger conditioning, similar to makiwara.

=== Sui Sau Jong ===
The sui sau jong (breaking hand dummy) features a swinging arm around the shoulder level, hanging sandbags, as well as a rotor-like arm at the top, located at head height. The arms are coordinated so that striking the swinging arm causes the rotation of the helicopter arm, and vice versa. The main aim of this dummy is to train quick reactions for counterattacks.

=== Ma Jong ===
Unlike other dummies, the Ma Jong (horse dummy) is a moveable dummy.

=== Others ===
Other dummys used in Choy Lee Fut includes the qiang bao zhuang (墻包樁) (a wall mounted sand bag), sha bao zhuang (沙包樁) (a sand bag apparatus, with one main heavy sand bag connected to two other sand bags on its side through a pulley system), and other mechanical dummies.
