= Nanquan (martial art) =

Group of Chinese martial arts

Nanquan 南拳
- Also known as: Southern Fist
- Focus: Striking, weapons training
- Country of origin: China
- Creator: No single creator, attributed to either: Martial arts knowledge of Qi Jiguang and Yu Dayou, transformed by Hongmen; Members of Southern Shaolin Monastery
- Famous practitioners: Yu Dayou, Qi Jiguang, (Note: He is a Northern Shaolin Kung Fu (Taizu Changquan) practitioner who contributed to the development of the southern styles.) Huang Junhua, Phạm Quốc Khánh, Willy Wang (wushu), Angie Tsang
- Olympic sport: Wushu (sport)

Nanquan (Note: (Chinese: 南拳; pinyin: Nán quán; lit. 'southern fist', or Chinese: 南派; pinyin: Nán pài; lit. 'southern school')) refers to a classification of Chinese martial arts that originated in Southern China.

The southern styles of Chinese martial arts are characterized by emphasis on "short hitting" and specific arm movements, predominantly in southern styles such as Hung Kuen, Choi Lei Fut, Hak Fu Mun, Wuzuquan, Wing Chun, and so on.

== History and development ==
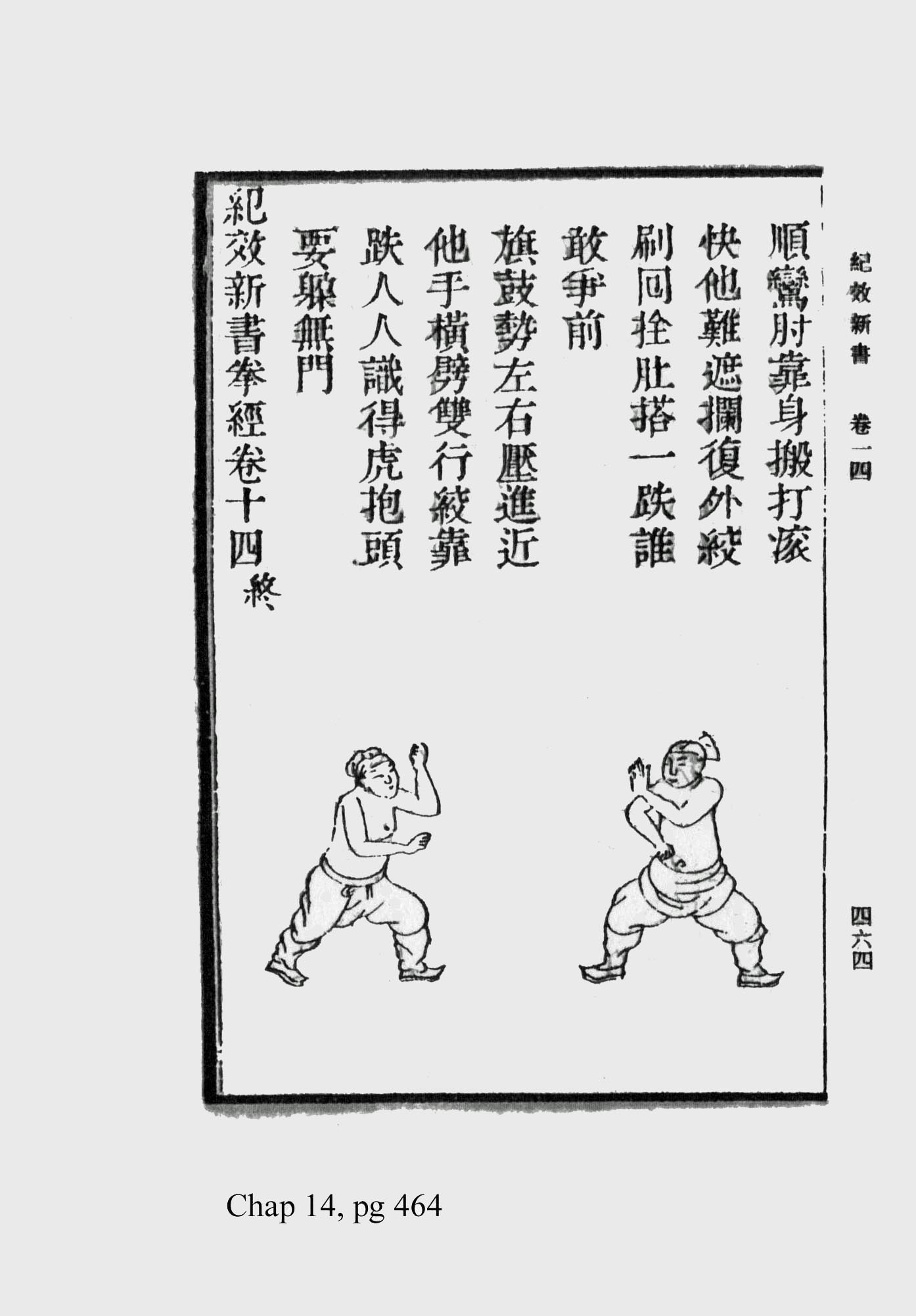
Unarmed fighting instructions as depicted in Qi Jiguang's Jixiao Xinshu would form basis of Nanquan

During the Ming dynasty of the 16th century, there were Wokou (Japanese pirates) active on the coast of China. At one point, Generals Qi Jiguang and Yu Dayou were stationed in Fuqing and Putian in the Central Fujian. The local monks in those areas defended themselves using iron rods to repel the pirates. Yu Dayou and Qi Jiguang taught martial arts to the local armies and civilians to fight against the pirates, with General Qi teaching the use of javelins, knives and other weaponry. The fourteenth chapter of General Qi's Jixiao Xinshu includes a modified version of the 32nd posture of the Taizu Changquan. After Qi Jiguang left, the development of unarmed fighting methods was left to the soldiers.

== Southern Shaolin Monastery ==
The Southern Shaolin Monastery is considered a significant development in the history of Shaolin Wushu in Southern China. The Tang dynasty branched from the Shaolin Temple of Mount Song to Fujian. General Qi Jiguang of the Ming dynasty would later import Taizu Changquan and other martial arts to the region.

=== The Concept of Burning (South) Shaolin Temple ===
The legend about the burning of the southern Shaolin Temple was recorded in a conference catalogue of the Guangzhou Hongmen Society meeting that took place in the late Qing dynasty. It is believed that it was written based on the history of the time and the information acquired by the Hongmen at the end of the Ming dynasty.

== Contemporary Wushu Nanquan ==
The contemporary Wushu event Nanquan is a modern style created in the 1960s, and was derived from martial arts from the Chinese provinces south of the Yangtze River, predominantly those styles popular in Guangdong, Guangxi, Fujian, and Zhejiang. The basis of contemporary Nánquán hails primarily from traditional Cantonese family styles of 洪 (Hung), 李 (Lei), 劉 (Lau), 莫 (Mok) and 蔡 (Choi), along with their more contemporary Kung Fu variants of Choi Lei Fut, Hung Ga, and Wing Chun.

Contemporary Nanquan features vigorous, athletic movements with very stable, low stances, extensive hand techniques, and a vocal articulation called fasheng ("release shout"), which is the predecessor of the Japanese and Korean martial arts kiai. Power is driven from sharp waist movements with special emphasis on fast stance transition to generate power and speed in the arms. Signature hand techniques of Nanquan are the consecutive downward strikes of the left and right fist called Gua Gai Quan (Gwa Kup Kuen; 挂盖拳), and consecutive upper cuts while driving forward called Paoquan (Pow Kuen; 抛拳). There are relatively few kicks in Nanquan although the Tengkong Pantui Cepu (腾空盘腿度侧扑; "flying cross legs kick and land on the side") and Li Yu Da Ting (鲤鱼打挺直立; carp skip-up) are very common in advanced Nanquan routines. Nanquan also has its own contemporary weapons – the Southern Broadsword (Nandao; 南刀) and Southern Staff (Nangun; 南棍), which were included in the International Wushu competition in 1999.

In 2003, the International Wushu Federation (IWUF) established rules of contemporary Nanquan to make jumping techniques (难度) mandatory in its Nanquan routines. Jump kicks spinning in mid-air between 360 and 720 degrees before touching the ground are now used in all IWUF Nanquan forms along with the Stationary Back Flip (原地后空翻) and the Single Step Back Tuck (单跳后空翻) for advanced IWUF competitors.

== Schools of Nanquan ==
Styles classified as Nanquan are mainly located in the provinces of Guangdong, Guangxi, Fujian, Hunan, Zhejiang and Yunnan.

=== Guangdong Nanquan ===
==== Main five schools ====
Guangdong Nanquan is characterized by schools of the Five Family Elders, which are:

- Hung Ga (洪家拳)
- Liujiaquan (刘家拳)
- Choy Gar (蔡家拳)
- Li family kung fu (李家拳)
- Mok Gar (莫家拳)

==== Others ====
- Choy Li Fut (蔡李佛)
- Wing Chun (詠春拳)
- Weng Chun (永春拳)
- Bak Fu Pai (白虎派)
- Xiajiaquan (侠家拳)
- Bak Mei (白眉拳)
- Nanzhiquan (南极拳)
- Ruquan (儒拳)
- Fut Gar (佛家拳)
- Diaojiaquan (刁家拳)
- Zhujiaquan (朱家拳)
- Yuejiaquan (岳家拳)
- Zhongjiaquan (钟家拳)
- Kunlunquan (昆仑拳)
- Yanzaoquan

=== Fujian Nanquan ===
- Wuxingquan (五形拳)
- Wuzuquan (五祖拳)
- Luohanquan (罗汉拳)
- Meihuazhuang (梅花桩)
- Lianchengquan (连城家拳)
- Dishuquanfa (地术拳法)
- Yongjiafa (泳家法)
- Wumeiquan (五枚拳)
- Yuanquan (猿拳)
- Shiquan (狮拳)
- Huquan (虎拳)
- Xiangdianquan (香店拳)

=== Hubei Nanquan ===
Hubei Nanquan contains five major schools (Hubei wu da pai, 湖北五大派):

- Hongmenquan (洪门拳)
- Kongmenquan (孔门拳)
- Yuemenquan (岳门拳)
- Yumenquan (鱼门拳)
- Sunmenquan (孙门拳)

=== Other Nanquan ===
- Jow-Ga kung fu (周家拳) (from Xinhui, China)
- Baoquan (Leopard Kung Fu)
- Fu Jow Pai
- Nan Pai Tanglang (Southern Praying Mantis)
- Hung Fut

== See also ==
- Northern and southern China
- Styles of Chinese martial arts
- Wushu (sport)
- Kung Fu

== Bibliography ==
- Guangxi Wang (2012). Chinese Kung Fu. Cambridge University Press. ISBN 9780521186643.
- Lu Zhouxiang (2018). Politics and Identity in Chinese Martial Arts. Routledge. ISBN 9781351610032.
- Benjamin N. Judkins & Jon Nielson (2015). The Creation of Wing Chun: A Social History of the Southern Chinese Martial Arts. SUNY Press. ISBN 978-1438456959.
