= Styles of Chinese martial arts =

Overview of the fighting styles

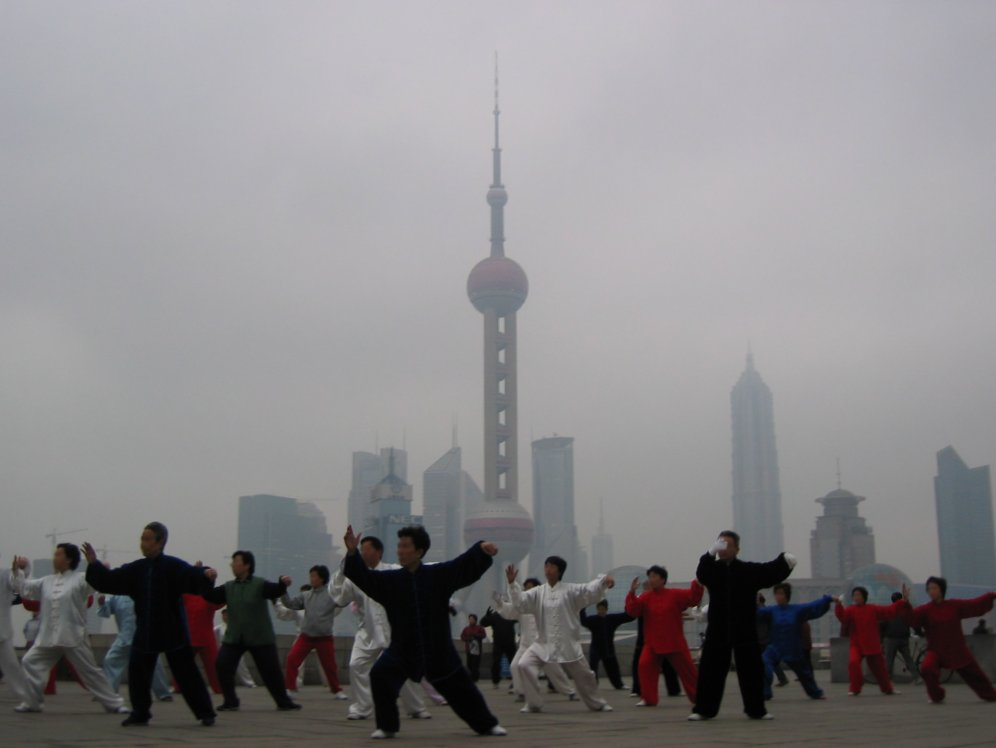
The Chinese martial arts tai chi being practiced on the Bund in Shanghai.

There are hundreds of different styles of Chinese martial arts, each with their own sets of techniques and ideas. The various movements in kung fu, most of which are imitations of the fighting styles of animals, are initiated from one to five basic foot positions: normal upright posture and the four stances called dragon, frog, horse riding, and snake.

The concept of martial arts styles appeared from around the Ming dynasty. Before the Ming period, martial skills were commonly differentiated mainly by their lineage. There are common themes among these styles which allow them to be grouped according to generalized "families" (家; jiā), "fractions" (派; pài), "class" (门; mén), or "schools" (教; jiào) of martial art styles. There are styles that mimic movements from animals, or otherwise refer or allude to animals or mythical beings such as dragons, and others that gather inspiration from various Chinese philosophies or mythologies. Some deeply internal styles tend to focus strongly on practice relating to harnessing of qi energy, while some more-conspicuously external styles tend more to display skills and abilities in competition or exhibition.

The rich variety of styles has led to the creation of numerous classification schemes. Geographical location such as regional affiliation is one well-known example. A particular Chinese martial arts style can be referred to as either a northern fist (北拳) or a southern fist (南拳) depending on its point of origin. Additional details such as province or city can further identify the particular style. Other classification schemes include the concept of external (外家拳) and internal. This criterion concerns the training focus of a particular style. Religious affiliation of the group that found the style can also be used as a classification. The three great religions of Taoism, Buddhism and Confucianism have associated martial arts styles. There are also many other criteria used to group Chinese martial arts; for example, imitative-styles (像形拳) and legendary styles; historical styles and family styles. Another more recent approach is to describe a style according to their combat focus.

== Geographical classifications ==
The traditional dividing line between the northern and southern Chinese martial arts is the Yangtze River. A well-known adage concerning Chinese martial arts is the term "Southern fists and Northern kicks" (「南拳北腿」). This saying emphasizes the difference between the two groups of Chinese martial arts. However, such differences are not absolute and there are many Northern styles that excel in hand techniques and conversely, there are many different types of kicks in some Southern styles. A style can also be more clearly classified according to regional landmarks, province, city and even to a specific village.

=== Northern styles ===
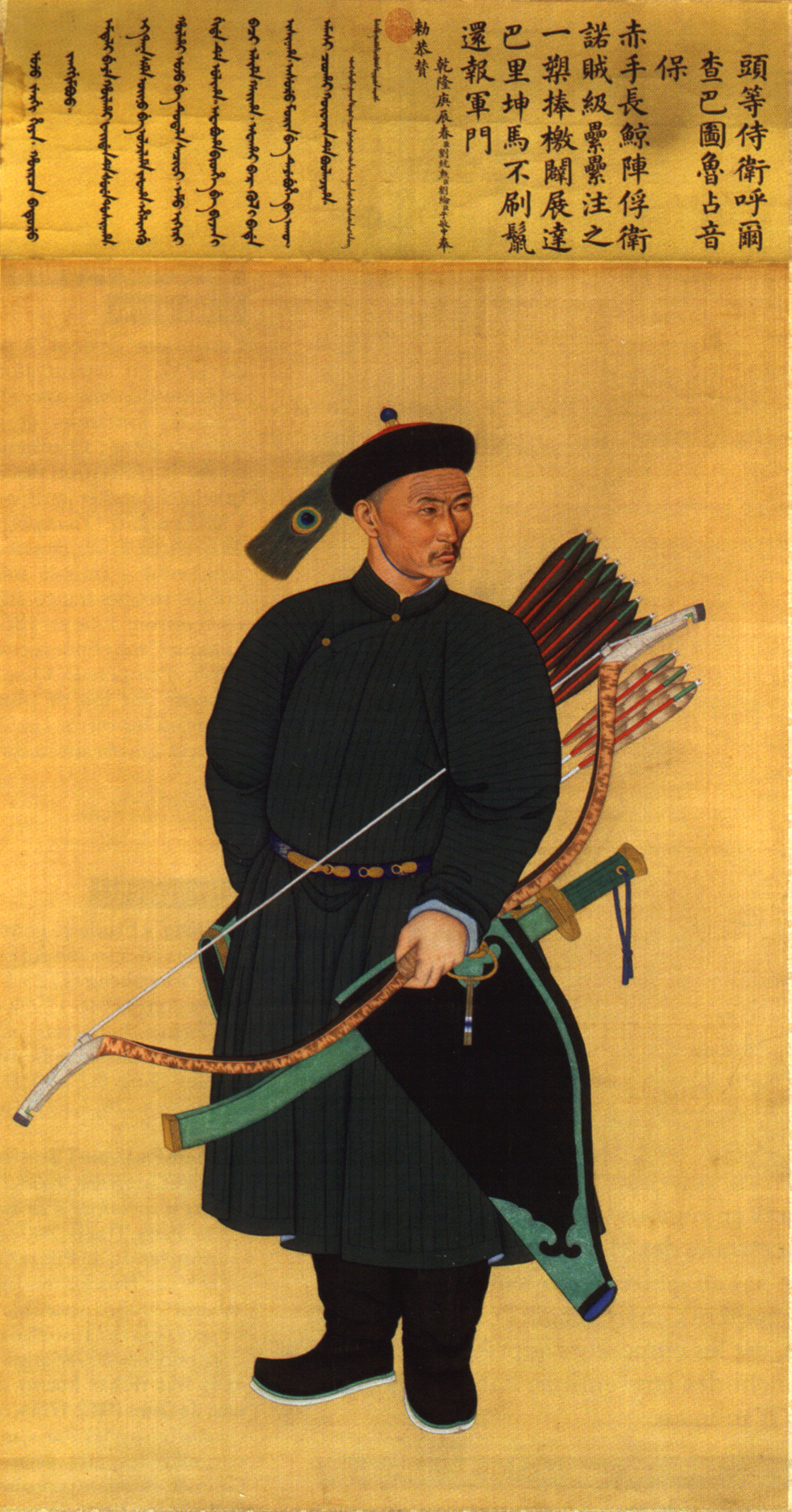
Manchu banner soldier, a caste of professional martial artists active in Chinese society as recently as a hundred years ago

Northern styles (北派; běipài) feature deeply extended postures—such as the horse, bow, drop, and dragon stances—connected by quick fluid transitions, able to quickly change the direction in which force is issued.

The group of Northern martial arts includes many illustrious styles such as Northern Shaolin Kung Fu, Baguazhang, Bajiquan, Chaquan, Chuojiao, Eagle Claw, Northern Praying Mantis and tai chi. Changquan is often identified as the representative Northern style and forms a separate division in modern Wushu curriculum.

Northern styles exhibit a distinctively different flavor from the martial arts practiced in the South. In general, the training characteristics of northern styles put more focus on legwork, kicking and acrobatics. The influence of Northern styles can be found in traditional Korean martial arts and their emphasis on high-level kicks.

=== Southern styles ===
Southern Chinese martial arts (南派; nánpài) feature low stable stances and short powerful movements that combine both attack and defense. In practice, Nanquan focus more on the use of the arm and full body techniques than high kicks or acrobatics moves. The influence of Southern styles can be found in Goju Ryu, Uechi Ryu, and some other styles of karate from Okinawa and also in kempo both American and Japanese styles.

The term Southern styles typically applies to the five family styles of Southern China: Choy Gar, Hung Ga, Lau Gar (刘家), Ng Ying kung fu (五形功夫), Li (Lee) Family and Mok Gar. Other styles include: Choy Li Fut, Fujian White Crane, Dog-style kung fu, Five Ancestors, Wing Chun, Southern Praying Mantis, Hak Fu Mun, Bak Mei and Dragon-style. There are sub-divisions to Southern styles due to their similar characteristics and common heritage. For example, the Fujian martial arts can be considered to be one such sub-division. This groups share the following characteristics that "during fights, pugilists of these systems prefer short steps and close fighting, with their arms placed close to the chest, their elbows lowered and kept close to the flanks to offer them protection". Nanquan became a separate and distinct component of the current Wushu training. It was designed to incorporate the key elements of each major Southern style.

=== Other geographical classifications ===
Chinese martial arts can also be identified by the regional landmarks, province, city or even village. Generally, this identification indicates the region of origin but could also describe the place where the style has established a reputation. Well-known landmarks used to characterize Chinese martial arts include the famous mountains of China. The Eight Great Schools of Martial Arts, a grouping of martial arts schools used in many wuxia novels, is based on this type of geographical classifications. This group of schools includes: Mount Hua, Mount Emei, Wudang Mountains, Kongtong Mountains, Kunlun Mountains, Cang Mountain, Mount Qingcheng and Mount Song Shaolin. Historically, there were 18 provinces in China. Each province has its own styles of martial arts. For example, in Xingyiquan, there are currently three main branches: Shanxi, Hebei and Henan. Each branch has unique characteristics but they can all be traced to the original art developed by Li Luoneng and the Dai family. A particular style can also be identified by the city where the art was practised. For example, in the North, the cities of Beijing or Tianjin have created different martial arts branches for many styles. Similarly, in the South, the cities of Shanghai, Quandong and Foshan all represented centers of martial arts development. Older martial art styles can be described by their village affiliation. For example, Zhaobao tai chi is a branch of Chen-style tai chi originating from Zhaobao village.

== External and internal classifications ==
The distinction between external and internal (外内) martial arts comes from Huang Zongxi's 1669 Epitaph for Wang Zhengnan. Stanley Henning proposes that the Epitaph's identification of the internal martial arts with the Taoism indigenous to China and its identification of the external martial arts with the foreign Buddhism of Shaolin—and the Manchu Qing Dynasty to which Huang Zongxi was opposed—may have been an act of political defiance rather than one of technical classification. Kennedy and Guo suggests that external and internal classifications only became popular during the Republican period. It was used to differentiate between two competing groups within The Central Guoshu Academy. Regardless of the origin of this classification scheme, the distinction becomes less meaningful since all complete Chinese martial art styles have external and internal components. This classification scheme is only a reminder of the initial emphasis of a particular style and should not be considered an absolute division.

=== External styles ===
External style (Chinese: 外家; pinyin: Wài jiā; lit. 'external family') are often associated with Chinese martial arts. They are characterized by fast and explosive movements and a focus on physical strength and agility. External styles includes both the traditional styles focusing on application and fighting, as well as the modern styles adapted for competition and exercise. Examples of external styles are Shaolinquan, with its direct explosive attacks and many Wushu forms that have spectacular aerial techniques. External styles begin with a training focus on muscular power, speed and application, and generally integrate their qigong aspects in advanced training, after their desired "hard" physical level has been reached. Most Chinese martial art styles are classified as external styles.

=== Internal styles ===
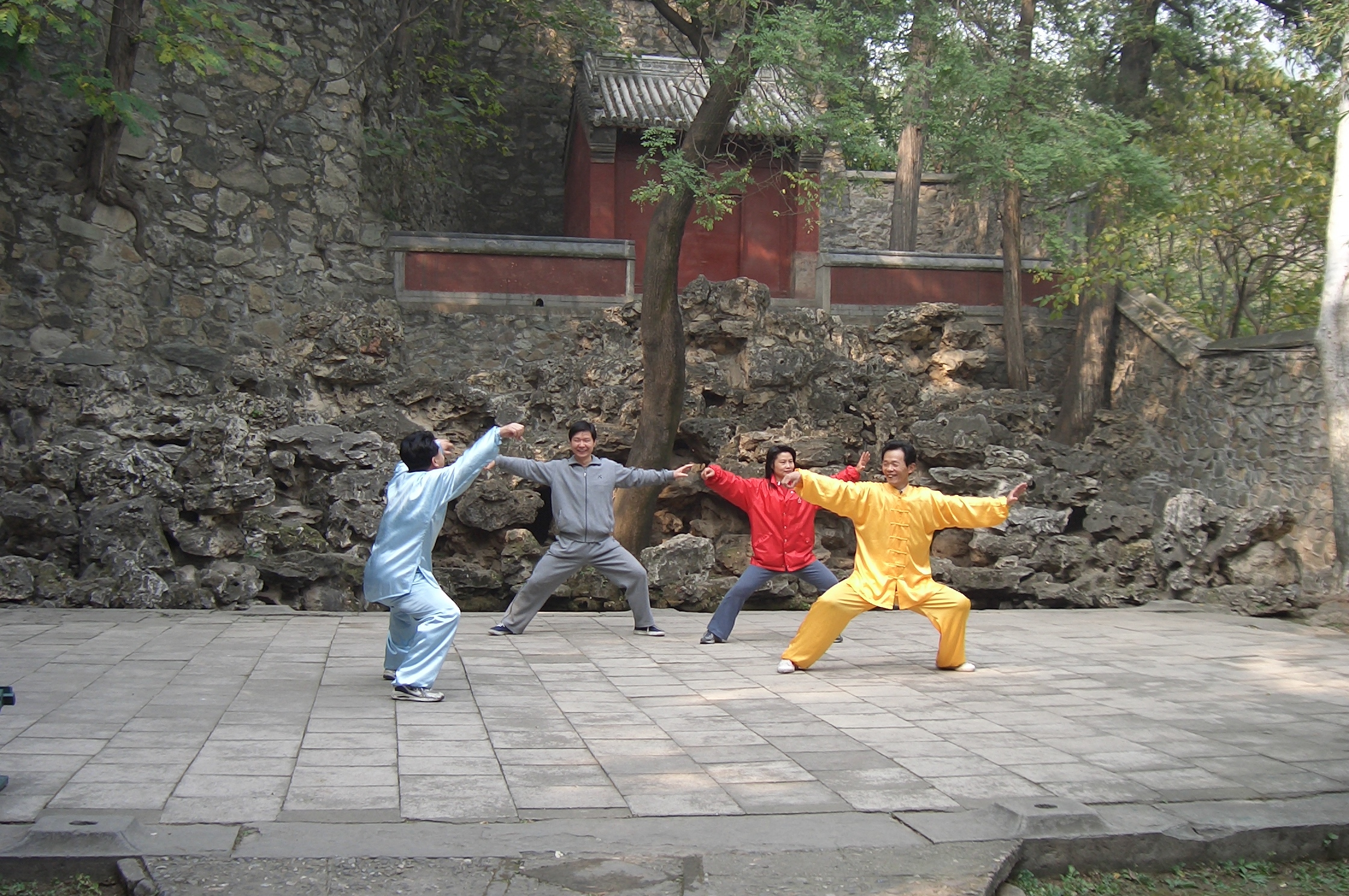
Tai chi, the best-known internal style of Chinese martial arts, being practiced at the Fragrant Hills Park, Beijing

Internal styles (Chinese: 内家; pinyin: Nèi jiā; lit. 'internal family') focus on the practice of such elements as awareness of the spirit, mind, qi (breath, or energy flow) and the use of relaxed leverage rather than muscular tension, which soft stylists call "brute force". While the principles that distinguish internal styles from the external were described at least as early as the 18th century by Chang Nai-chou, the modern terms distinguishing external and internal styles were first recorded by Sun Lutang; who wrote that tai chi, Baguazhang, and Xingyiquan were internal arts. Later on, others began to include their style under this definition; for example, Liuhebafa, Ziranmen, and Yiquan.

Components of internal training includes stance training (zhan zhuang), stretching and strengthening of muscles, as well as on empty hand and weapon forms which can contain quite demanding coordination from posture to posture. Many internal styles have basic two-person training, such as pushing hands. A prominent characteristic of internal styles is that the forms are generally performed at a slow pace. This is thought to improve coordination and balance by increasing the work load, and to require the student to pay minute attention to their whole body and its weight as they perform a technique. In some styles, for example in the Chen style of tai chi, there are forms that include sudden outbursts of explosive movements. At an advanced level, and in actual fighting, internal styles are performed quickly, but the goal is to learn to involve the entire body in every motion, to stay relaxed, with deep, controlled breathing, and to coordinate the motions of the body and the breathing accurately according to the dictates of the forms while maintaining perfect balance. Internal styles have been associated in legend and in much popular fiction with the Taoist monasteries of Wudangshan in central China.

== Religious classifications ==
Chinese martial arts being an important component of Chinese culture are also influence by the various religions in China. Many styles were founded by groups that were influenced by one of the three great philosophical influences of Buddhism, Taoism and Confucianism.

=== Buddhist styles ===
Buddhist styles include Chinese martial arts that originated or practised within Chinese Buddhist temples and later spread to laity community. These styles often include Buddhist philosophy, meditation, imagery and principles. The most famous of these are the Shaolin (and related) styles, e.g. Shaolinquan, Choy Li Fut, Fut Gar, Luohanquan, Hung Gar, Wing Chun, Dragon style and White Crane. and recently a contemporary style called wuxingheqidao. One common theme for this group is the association with Chan Buddhism.

==== Shaolin kung fu ====
The term "Shaolin" is used to refer to those styles that trace their origins to Shaolin, be it the Shaolin Monastery in Henan Province, another temple associated with Shaolin such as the Southern Shaolin Temple in Fujian Province, or even wandering Shaolin monks. More restrictive definitions include only those styles that were conceived on temple grounds or even just the original Henan temple proper. The broadest definition includes just about all external Chinese martial arts, though this has much to do with the attractiveness of the Shaolin "brand name".

=== Taoist styles ===
Taoist styles are popularly associated with Taoism. They include Chinese martial arts that were created or trained mostly within Taoist Temples or by Taoist ascetics, which often later spread out to laymen. These styles include those trained in the Wudang Mountains, and often include Taoist philosophy, principles and imagery. Some of these arts include Tai chi, Wudangquan, Baguazhang, Liuhebafa and Bak Mei kung fu.

=== Islamic styles ===
Islamic styles are those that were practiced traditionally solely or mainly by the Muslim Hui minority in China. These styles often include Islamic principles or imagery. Example of these styles include: Chaquan, Tan Tui, Bajiquan, some branches of Xingyiquan and (七士拳; Qīshìquán).

== Historical classifications ==
=== Imitative-styles ===
Imitative-styles are styles that were developed based on the characteristics of a particular creature such as a bird or an insect. Entire systems of fighting were developed based on the observations of their movement, fighting abilities and spirit. Examples of the most well-known styles are white crane, tiger, monkey (Houquan), dog and mantis. In some systems, a variety of animals are used to represent the style of the system; for instance, there are twelve animals in most Xing yi practice.

=== Legendary and historical styles ===
Many Chinese martial arts styles are based or named after legends or historical figures. Examples of such styles based on legends and myths are the Eight Immortals and Dragon styles. Example of styles attributed to historical figures include Xingyiquan and its relationship to Yue Fei and tai chi which trace its origins to a Taoist Zhang Sanfeng.

=== Family styles ===
Family affiliations are also an important means of identifying a Chinese martial arts system. Heavily influenced by the Confucian tradition, many styles are named in honor of the founder of the system. The five family (Choi, Hung, Lau, Lei, Mok) of Southern Chinese martial arts are representative of family styles. Family styles can also denote branches of a system. For example, the families of Chen, Yang, Wu and Sun represent different training approaches to the art of Tai Chi Chuan.

=== By main style of application/attack ===
Another popular method to describe a particular style of Chinese martial arts is to describe the style's emphasis in terms of the four major applications. The four major applications are: kicking (踢), hitting (打), wrestling (摔) and grabbing (Chin na). A complete system will necessary include all four types of applications but each style will differ in their training focus. For example, most Northern styles are said to emphasize kicking, Southern styles have a reputation for their intricate hand techniques, Shuai jiao practitioners train predominately in full-body close-range techniques, Eagle claw fighters are noted for their grabbing expertise, and Wing Chun focusses on hitting (with the hands/elbows).

=== Other styles ===
The variety of classification schemes, like the subject of Chinese martial arts, are endless. Some styles are named after well-known Chinese philosophies. For example, Baguazhang is based on the Taoist philosophy of the eight trigrams (Bagua). Some styles are named after the key insight suggested by the training. For example, liuhebafa is a system based on the ideas of six combinations and eight methods.

== See also ==
- Boxing styles and technique
- Comparison of karate styles
- Comparison of kobudō styles
- Hybrid martial arts
- Styles of wrestling
