= Nam Pai Chuan =

Shaolin Nam Pai Chuan 少林南北拳
- Also known as: Nam Pai Chuan, North-South Fist,
- Focus: Striking, Chin Na, Qigong, Dim mak, weapons training
- Country of origin: United Kingdom or China
- Creator: Christopher Lai Khee Choong (Note: Style traces its earliest influences to a Fut Gar & Wuzuquan practitioner Seh Koh San (1886-1960). However, it is Christopher Lai Khee Choong who established the Nam Pai Chuan system in 1978 and is recognized the founder of the style. (see Crudelli))
- Parenthood: Wuzuquan, Southern Shaolin Kung Fu (Fut Gar, Luohanquan, Nanquan), Judo
- Olympic sport: No

Shaolin Nam Pai Chuan (Chinese: 少林南北拳; literally "Shaolin North and South Boxing") - also Nam Pai Chuan (Chinese: 南北拳) for short - is a style of Chinese martial arts. It is a relatively modern style, de jure established in 1978 that has mainly proliferated in the UK and from there, to Belgium, France, New Zealand, Canada, Japan, Australia and Malaysia.

== History and development ==
This style was brought to Malaysia by Cho-Si (ancestral master) Seh Koh San, who became abbot of the Siong Lim Temple in Singapore, and died in 1960 at the age of 74. When Seh Koh San was young he learned Wuzuquan from Cho Pew; and southern Shaolin Kung Fu (which has been referred to as Fut Gar, Luohanquan, Nanquan, Ng Ying Kungfu). from chief abbot Wei Jing.

One of his students was Quek Hen Choon, who is famous for his demonstrations of Ying Qigong.

The style was brought to international attention by Christopher Lai Khee Choong - often identified as "Sifu Lai". Prior to Lai's travels to Europe, he studied Shaolin Kung Fu under Quek Heng Choon from 1967 onwards. At that time, Lai also practiced Taekwondo under Leow Cheng Koon, who was the head of the Malaysian Taekwondo Federation. Later, Lai would serve as Secretary General of Malaysian Taekwondo Association (WT) from 1974 until him leaving the country in 1979.

Lai had emigrated to United Kingdom around 1977 and opening his martial arts school in 1979 at London. Under permission by Sifu Quek, Lai used the name "Shaolin Nam Pai Chuan" for his martial arts system, that combined Lai's expertise in Northern and Southern Shaolin Kung Fu, Taekwondo and other styles - such as Judo and Wado-Ryu Karate. The style has since expanded to include many centres on the UK and other countries.

== Features ==
According to author Chris Crudelli, the Nam Pai Chuan is a very broad style that includes kicking, punching, chin na locking, take-downs, throwing, pressure points (dim mak), weapons and many other techniques, as well as Chi Gung (breathing energy exercises). It also combines elements of Judo, Wadō-ryū and Taekwondo.
