= Wujiaquan =

Wujiaquan is a traditional martial art from Hunan, China, and is one of the styles of Chinese martial arts. It belongs to the Nanquan (martial art) school and is a branch of the Shaolin Temple's martial arts system.

== Origin ==
Wujiaquan was created and passed down by Wu Bida, a native of Fujian during the Qianlong period of the Qing Dynasty. Wu Bida was originally a disciple of the Southern Shaolin in Fujian. In his youth, he left his hometown and traveled extensively across Shandong, Henan, Hebei, Hubei, and other regions to seek masters and learn martial arts, deeply absorbing the essence of Wudang internal martial arts. Later, he settled in Xiangtan, Hunan, where he made a living by teaching martial arts. Due to his exceptional skills, people began to refer to the martial art by his surname, naming it Wujiaquan, or Southern Shaolin Wujiaquan.

== Introduction ==
The techniques of Wujiaquan include stance work, footwork, leg techniques, hand techniques, and elbow techniques, with a particular emphasis on elbow techniques. The six types of elbow techniques—bumping elbow, resting elbow, flat elbow, and others—are both powerful offensive tools and crucial for defense. The martial art features leg techniques, multiple hand techniques, and elbow techniques, all characterized by a small range of motion, with forceful, direct movements and sharp points of impact. These elements combine to create a distinctive style with aggressive and dynamic forms.

Wujiaquan has been passed down to the present day, with its best development in Hunan and Hubei, and Hunan, in particular, is led by the Chang-Zhu-Tan area. The Tang school in Changsha mainly focuses on practicing the "Tianzi Six Elbows" and "Qilin Six Elbows." The Li school in Zhuzhou is centered around the "Short Stance Grasping and Lifting Six Elbows," while the Feng school in Xiangtan primarily practices the "Triple Fork Six Elbows," "Grasping and Lifting Six Elbows," and "Exploring Strength and Intent Fist."

== Forms ==
The unarmed forms of Wujiaquan include the "Triple Fork Six Elbows," "Qilin Six Elbows," "Tianzi Six Elbows," "Grasping and Lifting Six Elbows," and "Exploring Strength and Intent Fist." The weapon forms consist of the "Wujia Single Broadsword," "Seven-Step Linking Staff," "Wujia Four-Gate Bench," and "Wulin Sword." The internal skills include the "Claw Technique," "Luohan Technique," and "Short Stance."
