= Jeong Yim =

Chinese martial artist

張炎 Cheung Yim
- Born: 1824 exact date unknown Xinhui County, Guangdong, China
- Died: ~1893 exact date unknown Fut San/Foshan, China
- Style: Hung Sing Choy Lee Fut
- Teachers: Chan Heung 陳享; Lei Yau-saan 李友山; Monk Ching Cho 青草和尚

Cheung Ah-yim (張炎 - 張鴻勝; 1824–1893; also known as Jeung Yim, Cheung Yim, Cheung Hung-sing, Jeong Hung-sing, Jeong Hong-sing, Zhang Yan, Zhang Hongsheng) was a key figure in the development and expansion of the Southern Chinese martial arts system Choy Lee Fut, and was the most prominent of Chan Heung's disciples to emerge from the Choy Lee Fut System.

Cheung Yim, an orphan from a broken family, was a student of martial art masters such as Lee Yau-san (Chan Heung's teacher), Chan Heung, and the monk Ching Cho Wo Sheung (Green Grass Monk 青草和尚), co-founder of the Choy Lee Fut system.
