= Wong Doc-Fai =

Chinese martial artist

黄德輝 Wong Doc-Fai
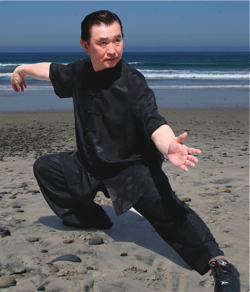
- Doc Fai Wong demonstrates the tai chi technique "Snake Creeps Down Low"
- Born: 1948 (age 77–78); Wangshan village, Guangdong province, China
- Style: Choy Li Fut, tai chi

Other information
- Website: Plum Blossom International Federation

Doc-Fai Wong (Chinese: 黄德輝) is a master of tai chi and the Hung Sing branch of Choy Li Fut kung fu. He was born in 1948 in the Guangdong province of China, specifically, the Wangshan village in the Doumen District of Zhuhai. In April 1960, he and his mother immigrated to San Francisco, California to be reunited with his father. He arrived as a third-generation citizen of the United States of America since both his grandfather and father were already citizens. He sought out his first kung fu teacher - Lau Bun (劉彬), the founder of the first Hung Sing Kwoon of Choy Li Fut in America, after encountering taunting and bullying due to language and ethnic difficulties after his arrival. When Lau Bun died in 1967, Wong Doc-Fai started teaching and opened his first school aged 19.

In 1976, he continued his Choy Li Fut training under Hu Yuen Chou (胡雲綽) and Wong Gong (黄江). When Hu Yuen Chou died in 1997, he continued working with Wong Gong, the current "keeper" of Jiangmen branch of Hung Sing Choy Li Fut, to promote Choy Li Fut worldwide. Wong Doc-Fai also had extensive training in Yang-style tai chi under the tutelage of Hu Yuen Chou, who studied under Yang Chengfu. Wong Doc-Fai is also a disciple and adopted son of Professor Peng-Si Yu (1902–1983) and Min Ou-Yang, both considered to be among China's greatest Qigong and Yiquan teachers. He also has expertise in the practice of Feng Shui.

In 1986, he founded the Plum Blossom International Federation. As of 2016, the Federation has continued to grow and is now represented in nine countries on six continents by over 300 schools in 40 countries with over 20,000 members. Grandmaster Doc-Fai Wong continues to provide instruction traveling throughout the world conducting seminars.

As of 2015, Wong Doc-Fai has been training in Choy Li Fut Kung Fu for 56 years and teaching martial arts for 47 years. Currently he is considered to be one of the highest ranking Choy Li Fut masters in the world and was just awarded "Grandmaster of the Year" by the FIOGA, Federation International of Grandmasters Association, based in China.

== Timeline ==
- 1948 - Born in Wangshan Village of the Wushan area, Doumen district, Zhuhai City, Guangdong province
- 1960 - Immigrated to San Francisco, California.
- 1963 - Began training with Lau Bun who brought Choy Li Fut to the United States and founded the first Hung Sing Kwoon of Choy Li Fut in America.
- 1967 - Begins teaching students after the death of Lau Bun.
- 1968 - Opened his first school in San Francisco, California.
- 1974 to 2003 - Tai chi instructor at San Francisco City College.
- 1976 - Became the first official disciple of both Great Grandmasters Hu Yuen Chou and Wong Gong.
- 1976 to 1997 - Studied in Hong Kong for his senior advanced level martial arts training each year during consecutive summers and winters.
- 1977 - Became one of the first California state certified acupuncturist and licensed practitioner of Traditional Chinese medicine.
- 1982 - First International Seminar in Barcelona (Spain), December 1982.
- 1986 - Founded the Plum Blossom International Federation.
- 1986-1993 - Became regular columnist for Inside Kung Fu Magazine.
- 1987 - Promoted to grandmaster of his federation for both Choy Li Fut and tai chi by Hu Yuen Chou before his retirement.
- 1987 - Promoted to grandmaster status by his teacher Wong Gong.
- Coach for the United States team competing in the Republic of China International Taijiquan Federation's World Championship Push Hands competition.
  - 1987 - The only U.S. team to win at this tournament, placing second only to Taiwan.
  - 1990 - Team again placed second.
- 2000 - 2011 Resumed his Bi-monthly column with Inside Kung Fu Magazine
- 2004 - Head Instructor of the Tai Chi Club of the Telegraph Hill Neighborhood Center in San Francisco.
- 2004 - Coach to the largest U.S. team of 40 competing in the First World Traditional Wushu Tournament held in Zhengzhou, China. His team wins totalled 72 medals; 20 gold, 38 silver, 14 bronze.
- 2006 - Accompanied by 50 students, Zhan Jiang City of China, First Traditional Wushu Invitational Competition, the "Hua Jian Garden Cup." His team members took home 63 medals;45 were gold, 12 silver, and 6 bronze. The competition was held in the Xu Wen County Public Square with over 60,000 observing the competition over two nights.
- 2006 - In April 2006, Wong Doc-Fai raised the funds for renovating the original residence of Chan Heung, the founder of Choy Li Fut kung fu in the King Mui Village of China for the Chan family, to set up the house as a museum.
- 2015 - Inducted into the FIOGA (Federation International Of Grandmaster's Association) Hall of Fame and awarded "Grandmaster of the Year."

== Plum Blossom International Federation ==
In 1986, Wong Doc-Fai established the International Plum Blossom Federation. As of 2016, the federation has over 300 schools in 40 countries worldwide. Federation schools can be found throughout the United States, Canada, Central and South America, Europe, Asia, Middle East, Africa, Philippines, and Tahiti. Wong Doc-Fai has certified instructors from his students down to the fourth generation teaching in his international federation.

== Awards and recognitions ==
- 1986 - Selected as one of the top 50 most influential martial arts personalities in the world by Inside Kung Fu magazine
- 1991 - Awarded the Kung Fu Artist of the Year by Black Belt magazine.
- 2003 - Inducted to the Martial Arts History Museum's Martial Arts Hall of Fame.
- 2003 - Referred to as a National Treasure in a Special Edition of Inside Kung Fu Magazine.
- 2005 - Picked as one of the Top 18 Greatest Sifus in America by Inside Kung Fu Magazine.
- 2007 - Selected as Inside Kung Fu Magazine's 2007 Instructor of the Year.
- 2013 - Certification of 10th Level Duan in accordance with the rules and regulations of the Federation International of Grandmaster Association (FIOGA)

== Publications ==
- Featured on the covers of Martial Arts magazines over 20 times
- Written over 200 articles.
  - Bimonthly columnist for Inside Kung Fu Magazine from 1986–1995 and 2000-2011
- Authored featured articles in the following magazines from 1980 through 2003
  - Inside Kung Fu Magazine
  - Karate Illustrated magazine
  - Karate Kung Fu Illustrated magazine
  - American Karate magazine
  - Kung Fu Tai Chi magazine
  - Black Belt Magazine
- Authored several books
  - Choy Li Fut Kung Fu: The Dynamic Fighting Art Descended From the Monks of the Shaolin Temple by Doc Fai Wong and Jane Hallander (1985) - History of Choy Li Fut Kung Fu. Description and examples of basics stance, hand techniques and includes basic training forms sets.
  - Shaolin Five Animals by Doc-Fai Wong (1987) - Historical background of the Shaolin Five Animals and the techniques incorporated within the hand forms.
  - Tai Chi Chuan's Internal Secrets by Doc Fai Wong and Jane Hallander (1991) - An in depth discussion on advanced Tai Chi techniques.
- Produced 9 instructional videos
