= Liang Zongdai =

Chinese poet and translator

Liang Zongdai (Chinese: 梁宗岱; 1903–1983) was a Chinese poet and translator. Born in Baise, Guangxi, to a father with origins in Xinhui, Jiangmen, Guangdong, he went to Europe to study western languages in 1924. His translation of Tao Qian's poems into French was published by Lemarget, Paris in 1930, with a preface by Paul Valéry whom the young poet had visited at home in 1926.

He was one of the most popular "new poets" writing in free verse, after the May Fourth Movement in China. His most famous work is the non-fictional Poetry and Truth (詩與真). The title was borrowed from Goethe's autobiography Dichtung und Wahrheit.

Liang's translations into Chinese include poetry by Shakespeare, Blake, Rilke, and Valéry, as well as Montaigne's essays. His translation of Goethe's Faust was destroyed during the Cultural Revolution.

He was persecuted during the Cultural Revolution, and devoted the last part of his life to the study of Chinese medicine. He married three times. His last wife was a performer of Cantonese opera, who wrote a short memoir, recollecting her relationship with the poet.
