= Snake kung fu =

Chinese martial art

Snake kung fu 蛇拳
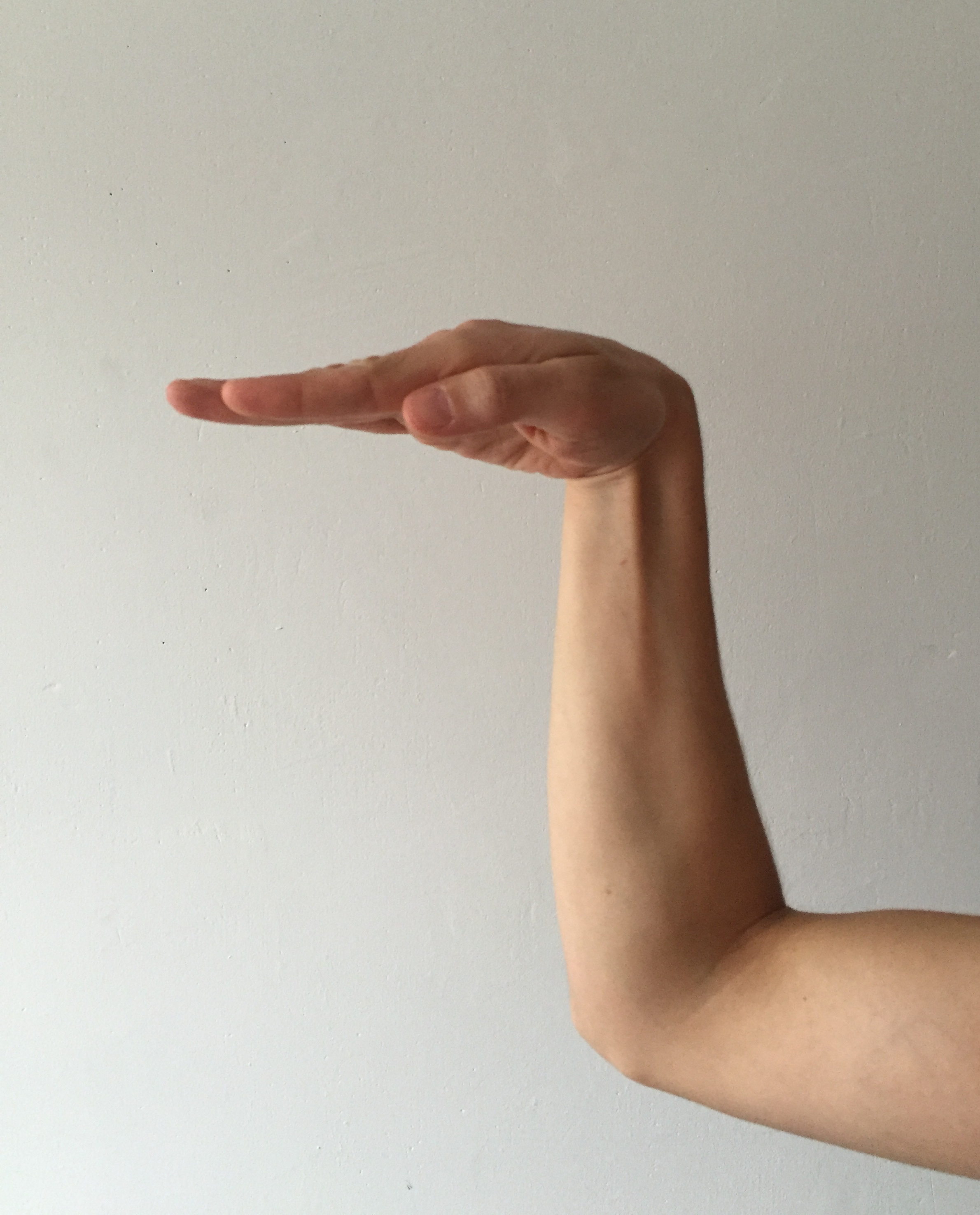
- Also known as: Shéquán, snake boxing
- Focus: Striking
- Country of origin: China
- Creator: Northern Style: Jueyuan with Li Yuanshou (Li Sou) and Bai Yufeng (co-founders); Southern Style: Yau Lung Kong
- Parenthood: Northern Style: Wuxingquan, Luohan quan, Neigong, Hongquan; Southern Style: Nanquan / Southern Kung Fu, Choy Gar
- Descendant arts: Li Gar, Wing Chun
- Olympic sport: No

Snake kung fu is a Shaolin boxing style, one of several Chinese martial arts known as "snake boxing" or "fanged snake style" (Chinese: 蛇拳; pinyin: shéquán; lit. 'snake fist') that imitate the movements of snakes. Proponents claim that adopting the fluidity of snakes allows them to entwine with their opponents in defense and strike them from angles they would not expect in offense. Snake style is said to especially lend itself to applications with the Chinese straight sword. The snake is also one of the animals imitated in Yang-style tai chi, Baguazhang and Xingyiquan. The sinuous, fluid motion of the snake lends itself to the practical theory that underlies the "soft" martial arts.

Different snake styles imitate different movements of snakes. Some, for example, imitate the Cylindrophiidae, while others imitate the python, while some schools imitate other types of snakes, like the viper and the cobra. There are two unrelated, Northern and Southern snake styles.

== Northern style (Shequan Beipai) ==
Snake is one of the archetypal Five Animals of Chinese martial arts; the other four being Crane, Tiger, Leopard, and Dragon.

Snake style is based on whipping or rattling power which travels up the spine to the fingers, or in the case of the rattler, the body shake which travels down the spine to the tip of the tailbone. The ability to sinuously move, essentially by compressing one's stomach/abdominal muscles, is very important. Footing is quite grounded. The stancework is fluid in order to maximize the whipping potential of any movement. This necessitates building a strong spine to contain the power and strong fingers to convey the strike. Since breath is important to any movement of the spine and ribs, snake style is considered one of the main styles which eventually led to internal training. Snake style is also known as an approach to weapons training, the Chinese straight sword and spear in particular. There are even specialty varieties of sword blades and spear points that curve back and forth down the length of the blade in imitation of the snake's body known as snake sword and snake spear.

Snake style generally aims for weak points of the human body, such as the eyes, groin and joints.

== Southern style (Shequan Nanpai) ==
The Southern Shaolin Temple in Fukien Province was sometimes known as "the snake temple". Snake style kung fu was practiced at this temple as well as dragon kung fu and praying mantis kung fu. Fukien temple was a refuge for the Henan Temple monks when that temple was destroyed. With them, they brought all the martial arts knowledge they had.

The snake style of green bamboo viper is one of the five subsets that was taught at the Southern Shaolin Temple. This particular form of snake fist originated in Cambodia and worked its way up to China. As it was integrated into Shaolin, it got more refined and sophisticated. The green bamboo viper is the snake style taught in the United States by Grandmaster Wing Loc Johnson Ng. Grandmaster Ng taught this particular snake style as well as water snake, shadow snake, king cobra, and Golden snake. These five type snakes make up the southern snake style system. Snake style kung fu is considered to be a highly advanced form of fighting due to the use of internal energy (chi) and the specialized breathing techniques.

There is also an obscure Southern Snake Style (Chinese: 蛇形刁手) whose grand master was Leung Tin Chiu who was born in the late 19th century and became well known as he ranked 35th in one of Nanking's Martial Art examinations in late 1929. His style (She yin Diu Sau), inherited from Ancient Monk, was an amalgamation of Southern Shaolin style and Choy Gar style learned from a Choy grandmaster. He had several disciples, the main who received the legacy his nephew Master Some K.F Leung of Hong Kong and the late Master C. M Fong at present day head-father Master of the system. The pugilistic style is best described as a mid-distance fighting style, using, by coincidence, some Wing Chun-like techniques in Hung Ga or Choy Gar-like forms. That attests to the Southern Shaolin origin of this style and its close relationship to other styles originating from Southern Shaolin. In fact Yau Lung Kong first learned from the Choy's family, but he did not have the privilege to all the secrets. Being less than satisfied he enrolled himself at the Southern Shaolin temple years and later combined all that he learned into this snake style ("She Ying Diu Sao"). It would best be described as a "Choy-Fut" style ("fut" means "buddha," a respectful address for deceased monks). Of course different "fut's" from the Southern Shaolin temple would pass on similar but different techniques or idiosyncratic execution of the same basic techniques. In this style of snake kung fu the force and techniques are softer than traditional southern styles. Besides straight punches and the flaming eye gouge as widely used in Wing Chun, this style also employs strikes fit's mill butterfly-buddha palms, the hook, upper cut, and gui quen (back fist) as central techniques. Biu tze (thrusting fingers) techniques resembling snake attacks are the secrets, and hence, the name of this style. There are multiple kicking techniques, as varied as typical northern styles with high kicks, but also typical are below-the-groin kicks seen in southern styles. There are six fist sets(like siu lam won, man fu ha san, she yin quan), two stick sets, single sword, short double swords, and other traditional weapons.

== Uses in fiction ==
- The style was exemplified in the movie "The Quest" starring Jean-Claude Van Damme. His character Chris is engaged in an international fighting tournament where he and his affiliates witnesses the effectiveness of this style by an apparently experienced contestant during the tournament. During the procession of the tourney, the Chinese contestant uses some of the Five Animal styles against his opponents (identified in the film as Monkey, Snake, and Tiger styles) are demonstrated as he seemingly defeats his opponents with ease. However, Chris is ultimately faced against said opponent and subsequently defeats the fighter by throwing him off with an unorthodox mixed style of kickboxing and street fighting just prior to a final battle between two main characters.
- The style gained prominence in Jackie Chan's film Snake in the Eagle's Shadow
- The style was also heavily featured in the acclaimed film Five Deadly Venoms
- The fictional character Kwai Chang Caine used elements of Snake Kung Fu in the television series Kung Fu
- The style also used in John Cheung Ng-long starring film Snake in the Monkey's Shadow
- It is the fighting style used by the video game character Christie from the Dead or Alive fighting game series.
- In Mortal Kombat: Deadly Alliance and Mortal Kombat: Armageddon, Snake is the primary fighting style of Shang Tsung. In Mortal Kombat: Deception, however, Havik uses Snake as his primary fighting style.
- Tekken's Lei Wulong uses Snake as well as four other animal styles as his fighting style.
- In the DreamWorks' movie Kung Fu Panda, along with its sequels and a TV spin-off, the character Viper, played by Lucy Liu, is a snake who, despite her lack of limbs, practices a stylized form of Snake Kung Fu.
- The Mime (Camilla Ortin), a minor Batman comic book villain published by DC Comics, is a master of both Snake style kung fu and tai chi.
- In Avatar: The Last Airbender Azula's friend and bodyguard Ty Lee utilizes snake style.
- In the 2008 Thai martial arts film Ong Bak 2, Tien (played by Tony Jaa) utilises snake-style Kung Fu in his training.
- In the 2010 remake of the Karate Kid movie - training in Kung Fu, rather than Karate - there is a woman seen practicing snake style while hypnotizing an actual snake.
- In the YA novel Snake by Jeff Stone, Seh is a young warrior monk who specializes in snake style kung fu.
- The Street Fighter IV character Rufus utilizes snake style as part of his fighting style.
- In the light novel and anime Juuni Taisen, while fighting the younger Tatsumi Brother's reanimated corpse, Tora identifies a stance he takes as belonging to snake-style kung fu.
- In the manga Kengan Omega, Yuzaki Mumon is a master of snake-style kung fu, and uses it against Tokuno'o "Nitoku" Tokumichi in a Kengan fight. However, this Yuzaki Mumon is later revealed to be an impostor; Toyoda Idemitsu was able to identify him as a fake due to the fact that he utilized a different style of snake kung fu than the original Yuzaki Mumon.
- In Lost Judgement main protagonist Takayuki Yagami uses parts of Snake Kung Fu fighting style in his Snake Style as one of his main fighting styles.

== See also ==
- Bando
