= Fut Gar =

Style of kung fu

Fut Ga Kuen 佛家拳
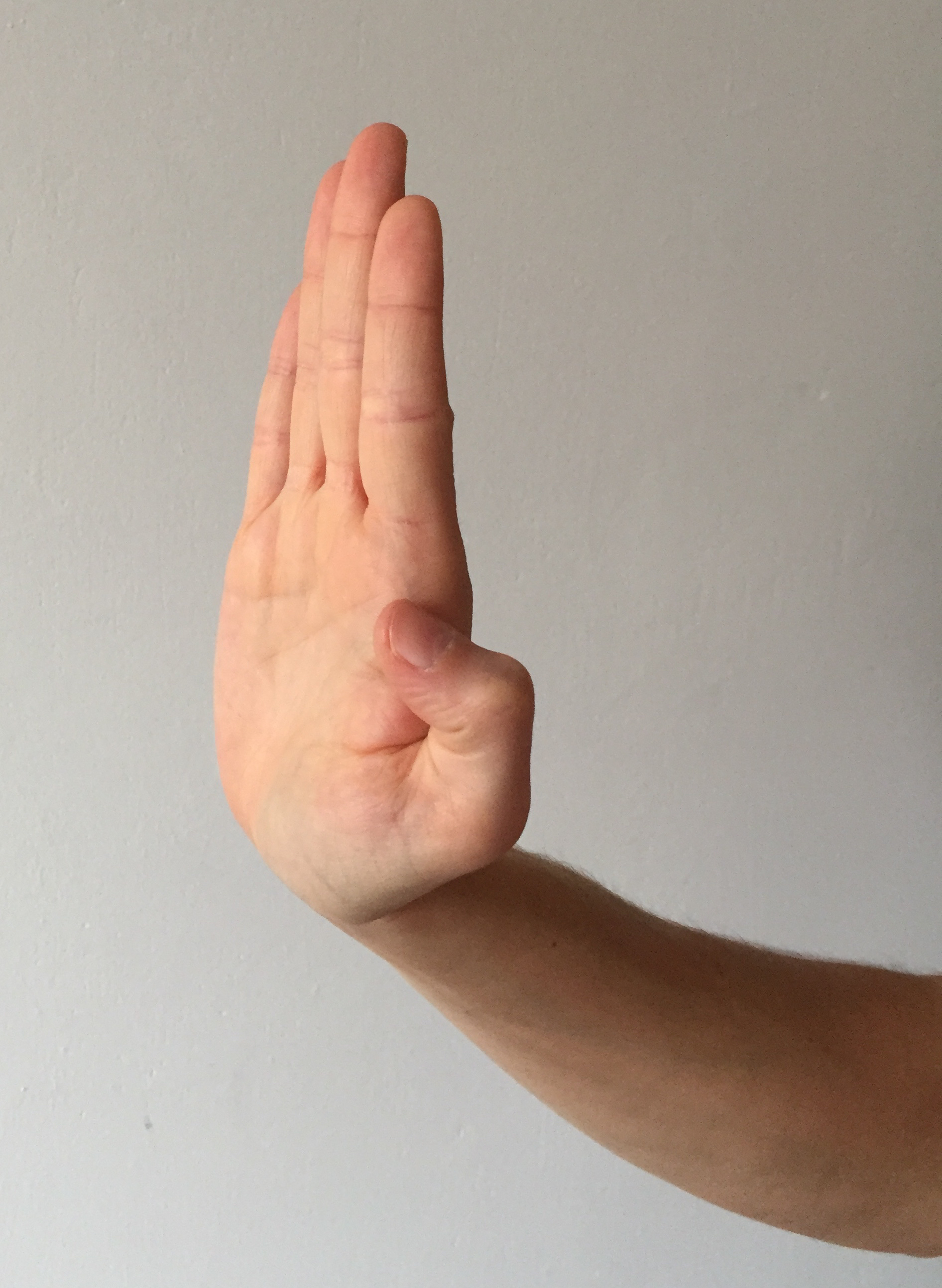
- Also known as: Siu Lum Fut Ga / 少林佛家, Fut Ga Kuen, Buddhist Family Fist, Hood Khar Pai
- Focus: Striking
- Country of origin: China
- Creator: Leung Tin Jiu / Leung Tin Chiu
- Famous practitioners: Lei Jou Fun (founder of Hung Fut); Chan Yuen-Wu (uncle and instructor of Chan Heung); Chan Heung (founder of Choy Li Fut); Lum Tai Yong, Chen Rong En; Wei Jing (instructor of Seh Koh San); Seh Koh San (founder of Nam Pai Chuan)
- Parenthood: Hung Ga, Choy Gar
- Descendant arts: Choy Li Fut, Hung Fut, Nam Pai Chuan, Nam Huỳnh Đạo
- Olympic sport: No

Fut Ga Kuen or Buddhist Family Fist is a relatively modern Southern Shaolin style of Kung Fu devised primarily from the combination of Hung Ga Kuen 洪家 and Choy Gar 蔡家 Kuen. The style utilizes mostly punches, palm strikes and low kicks, further characterized by evasive footwork, circular blocks and using the opponent's force against them.

The words "Fut Ga Kuen" literally translate to "Buddhist Family Fist". The word "Ga" in Cantonese means family. This name has been synonymous with the martial arts practiced in the Southern Shaolin Monastery in Fujian, and used as an ambiguous term for their skills.

One style that was formally founded using the name of "Fut Ga" has its origins at Qingyun temple near Dinghu Mountain in Guangdong Province. Early on in its history, the monks at this temple were fortunate enough to learn martial arts from fighters that had mastered the 5 most popular systems of Southern Kung Fu. These styles were Lau Gar, Li Gar, Mok Gar, Choy Gar, and Hung Gar. The names of the styles reflect the surname of the particular style's founder.

A monk named Leung Tin-jiu 梁天柱 realized the value of incorporating different schools or styles together and took only the best techniques of each style and discarded what he thought was useless or ineffective. A combination of mostly Choi Gar from Leung Siu-jong and Hung Gar from Yao Loon-kwong, this became Sil Lum Fut Gar 少林佛家 or "Shaolin Buddhist Family".

A branch of Fut Gar developed by Leung Tin-chiu is currently being partially taught in schools worldwide and was headed by Chen Rong-en (陈荣恩) 1922-2015, the only direct disciple of Leung Tin-jiu who was involved in spreading the style. The Leung Tin-jiu style of Fut Gar is best known in China for the Flying Dragon Staff Form which is known as the King of Staff Forms within the Kung Fu community. The National Fut Gar Kung Fu Training Centre taught by Sifu Richard Chow in Mississauga, Ontario, Canada is the longest running school that taught Fut Gar with the direct guidance of Grandmaster Chen. A newer school also closely monitored by Grandmaster Chen exists in China since 2004. In November 2007 an International Fut Gar Federation was formed to unite instructors of Fut Ga Kung Fu worldwide.

Master Wong Ting-fong opened the Golden Dragon Kung Fu Society in Buffalo NY over 50 years ago. He was a student of Leong Tin-chiu. He asked Sifu Norman Mandarino to open a school under his name when he closed his hands (stopped teaching) in 1974. Sifu Mandarino was Master Wong’s top ranked student and disciple. He opened The Golden Dragon Kung Fu Society under Master Wong's leadership. Sifu Mandarino changed the name to Mandarin Kung Fu after Master Wong died. He continues to instruct and practice a blend of Hung Gar, Choi Gar and Fut Gar as taught by Master Wong.

== Popular culture ==
- Sing, the main protagonist of Kung Fu Hustle, uses Fut Gar.
