= Sanjiang, Jiangmen =

Sanjiang 三江镇
- Town
- Location in Guangdong
- Coordinates: 22°26′06″N 113°05′59″E
- Country: China
- Province: Guangdong
- Prefecture-level city: Jiangmen
- District: Xinhui
- Village-level divisions: 1 residential community 12 villages

Area
  - Total: 82.37 km^{2} (31.80 sq mi)
- Elevation: 4 m (13 ft)

Population
  - Total: 47,000
  - Density: 570/km^{2} (1,500/sq mi)
- Time zone: UTC+8 (China Standard)
- Area code: 0750

Sanjiang (Chinese: 三江; pinyin: Sānjiāng; lit. 'three rivers') is a town of Xinhui District, in the southern suburbs of Jiangmen, Guangdong, People's Republic of China, located 16 kilometres (9.9 mi) from downtown Jiangmen. As of 2011, it has one residential community (社区) and 12 villages under its administration. It borders Mujing to the east, Gujing to the south, Shuangshui to the west across Yinzhou Lake (银洲湖), and Lile Subdistrict to the north.

== See also ==
- List of township-level divisions of Guangdong
