= Jow-Ga kung fu =

Martial art

Jow Ga Kuen 周家拳(洪頭蔡尾)
- Also known as: Jow Ga, Jow-style boxing
- Focus: Striking
- Country of origin: Xinhui, China
- Creator: Jow Lung (1891–1919)
- Famous practitioners: Jow Biu (1899–1961; Lung's brother); Jow Tin (Lung's brother); Jow Hip (Lung's brother); Jow Hoy (Lung's brother); Chan Man Cheung (1929; Biu's student); Kit Po Wong (1946–2018: Biu's student); Dean Chin (1950–1985: Chan's student); Hoy K. Lee (Chan's student); Lui Chu Shek; Wong Kun Leung; Lee Ngau
- Parenthood: Hung Ga, Choy Gar, Northern Shaolin kung fu, Ng Ying
- Olympic sport: No

Jow Ga kung fu (Chinese: 周家拳; pinyin: Zhōujiāquán; lit. 'Jow family boxing'; also romanized as Jow Ga Kuen) is a form of Chinese martial art. It was founded by Jow Lung, who was born in 1891, on the eleventh day of the third lunar month (April 16, 1891) in Sa Fu Village, Guangdong province, and died in 1919. His father was Jow Fong Hoy and his mother’s maiden name was Li. At the time of its inception, this particular style of kung fu was labeled as having the head of Hung Gar, the tail of Choy Gar and the patterns of the tiger and leopard, or simply Hung Tao Choy Mei. It was so labeled because the essential techniques incorporated the muscular and mighty movements of Hung Gar and the swift footwork and complex kicking of Choy Gar, making it a very effective form of self defense with emphasis on simultaneous attack and defense.

== History ==
=== Beginnings in southern China ===
The founder of the system was Jow Lung (周龍), who was born in 1891 in Hsin-Hui Sheng Sha Fu village in the Canton province of China. Jow Lung starting learning Hung Gar at an early age from his uncle, Jow Hung Hei (周雄喜), who was a student of Wong Kei Ying and who taught Jow Lung and his brothers Jow Hip, Jow Biu, Jow Hoy and, Jow Tin Nam Siu Lam Hung Gar. Jow Lung's training began with basic stances and steps. Regardless of age, those who practice Hung Gar suffer most during basic stance and step training. Jow Lung never complained about the training and his uncle took a special liking to him. One day Jow Hung told Jow Lung that he didn't think he would live much longer due to an old illness. Jow Hung told Jow Lung that he knew a unique set of bagua staff techniques that he wanted to pass on to Jow Lung before he died. Uncle Hung told Jow Lung that his kung fu technique had come to the point that if he learned the bagua staff techniques, he would be one of the best in the martial arts field. Within one month, Jow Lung learned the bagua staff techniques. Shortly after, his Uncle Jow Hung died. After the death of his uncle, Jow Lung followed Master Choy Gar Gung (蔡九公) / Choy Kau (Chi Ching Tsai Kong) and learned Choy Ga (蔡家) kung fu. It took Jow Lung only a few years to master Choy Ga kung fu because of his basic training in Hung Gar kung fu. Constantly exploring the strong points of each style with his brothers (Hung Ga's Steady Power and Penetrating Strikes and Choy Ga's Fast Changes and Fluid Footwork), they came up with the name Hung Tao Choy Mei (洪頭蔡尾; lit. 'Hung's Head and Choy's Tail').

=== Jow Lung's travels in Southeast Asia ===
At the age of 18, Jow Lung had a difficult time finding a job in his hometown, so he traveled to Malaysia (Singapore and Malaysia being one country at that time). In 1910, Jow Lung and many others went to find work as miners in Kuala Lumpur. The bosses, who were described as gangsters, would often beat the workers. One day Jow Lung got into a fight with one of his bosses and fatally wounded him. Jow Lung fled to the mountains and found a temple named Gi Leu (Kek Lok Si in some accounts). Because he hadn't eaten for many days and was exhausted, he asked an apprentice at the temple for help. The master of the temple, Chian Yi (or Hong Yi), agreed to provide shelter for Jow Lung in the temple. Chian knew that Jow Lung had natural talent in kung fu from the moment he saw him. Chian Yi taught Jow Lung Northern Shaolin kung fu that he himself had learned in Henan Province, with some elements of Ng Ying kung fu (Chinese: 五形功夫) or Five Animal Kung Fu. The Abbot encouraged Jow Lung to combine all 3 of the kung fu systems he had mastered into a single style. Jow Lung stayed in the monastery for over three years before achieving this goal. After returning home he instructed his brothers in the new style.

One day Master Chian Yi called Jow Lung and told him, "I have passed on to you the Northern Shaolin martial arts and medicine, and now your skills are good enough to hold a special place in the martial arts field." Master Chian Yi then ordered Jow Lung to leave the temple. When Jow Lung went back to Kuala Lumpur, he felt like centuries had gone by, but he never stopped practicing kung fu. From continuous practice, Jow Lung realized the uniqueness of the three styles of kung fu he learned and decided to combine them into one, thereby developing Jow Ga kung fu. Jow Lung felt that he would not be able to spread his family's kung fu in Kuala Lumpur, so he went back to his hometown in China.

=== Acceptance in Canton and death of Jow Lung ===
In 1915 General Lee Fook Lam of Canton needed a chief trainer for his army. He issued an open invitation for anyone interested to compete in an elimination tournament. Out of 100 applicants only Jow Lung defeated all his opponents and was then appointed to the position. Jow Lung sent for his brothers to assist with the training of the soldiers.

In four years they taught and steadily refined the teaching methods and material into a new system, which they decided to call "Jow Ga Style". Due to the system's effectiveness and the fame of their fighting abilities, the brothers were honored with the title "Five Tigers of Jow Ga" (周龍五虎傳).

In 1919 Jow Lung, due to exhaustion from teaching and promoting the Jow Ga Style, died at the age of only 29 from pneumonia.

=== New leadership and continued growth ===
After the death of Jow Lung the family met and elected Jow Biu to assume leadership of the system. Jow Biu resigned his position with the army and began promoting the Jow Ga system of kung fu. In 1936 the first school was established in Kowloon, Hong Kong. The Hong Kong school produced several notable masters, among them Chan Man Cheung, Lui Chu Shek, Wong Kun Leung, Lee Ngau. Jow Tin and Jow Hip also came down to Hong Kong to teach; many of their disciples are still teaching in Hong Kong. Within one year Jow Biu had established fourteen Jow Ga schools throughout China and within a few years the number had grown to more than eighty.

== General style ==
=== Influences ===
Jow Ga (Ga means "family") is a system of traditional kung fu that was developed from four Shaolin systems: namely, Hung Ga, Choy Gar, Northern Shaolin kung fu and Southern Ng Ying Kuen (learned in Malaysia alongside Buksillum thereby leading to its contribution to the syncretic development of Jow Ga—that Ng Ying Kuen Training was comparable to Hung Ga's Ng Ying Kuen Form that itself originally came into Hung Ga from contact with a version of the Ng Ying Style). Jow Ga is known as Hung Tao Choy Mei because the system incorporated Hung Ga kung fu's powerful upper body techniques and Choy Ga kung fu's swift footwork and complex kicking techniques from Northern Shaolin kung fu. Hung Ga kung fu is a southern style that was developed for close-to-medium range defense. This style emphasizes low stances and is especially known for its low horse stance. Kicks are generally low and hand techniques are powerful and direct, using the strong stances to deliver formidable blows, namely, a tremendous thrust punch. This style also includes the five animal techniques of the leopard, dragon, tiger, crane, and snake. This style primarily uses the tiger and crane, hard and soft animal techniques from its Shaolin origins. Hung means to stand tall with integrity. Choy Gar kung fu is also a southern style that emphasizes long reaching hands and wide horse stances.

=== Forms ===
There are over twenty traditional hand forms, including tiger-crane, tiger-leopard, and the famous five animal form. The "hang fist", "throw punch", "upper cuts", "hammer back fist", "downward whipping punch", and "jab punch" are some typical and effective techniques of the system. This system is an aggressive system that emphasizes long range techniques and blitz attacks. The power is generated from the hips in a rotating fashion. Elusive footwork is also prominent in this system, as are grappling, throwing, and high and low kicks. Intercepting and jamming are favorite techniques. Northern Shaolin kung fu originated from the Shaolin temple that resided in Northern China before its destruction. The present system of Northern Shaolin kung fu specializes in long-range fighting techniques. This system maintains that kicks are more effective than hand movements because the legs are longer than the arms, thereby keeping the opponent further away. Low stances are not emphasized as they reduce mobility. This style requires constant mobility to be effective. Jow Ga utilizes these three systems combined into one. To defend, one would use strong low stances and hold one's ground or may rely upon evasive tactics. To attack, the Jow Ga practitioner can rely on Choy Gar long-reaching arm techniuques combined with Northern Shaolin kung fu kicks and mobility. This system is suitable for all body types and can tailored to each individual. The student can master techniques most suited to him or her. This style requires hard work and discipline and is physically demanding.

Training includes an internal breathing form called Iron Wire Fist, which is used to strengthen muscles, organs, and bones. Additionally, there are over eighteen weapons sets, including batons, the staff, spear, three-sectional staff, wind sword, whip chain, and double-edged straight sword. Straight sword is the most revered and respected because its use demands total knowledge to master.

=== Lion dance ===
The Jow Ga Style is famous for its lion dance, which can be seen in numerous performances displayed at various important ceremonies by lion dancing teams, primarily Chinese New Year, Moon Festival, weddings, and government functions. The style has also become the traditional drumming style of many Vietnamese lion dance groups, which is mistakenly called trống Phật Sơn (Foshan drumming) in Vietnam, because Jow Ga and Foshan (佛山) are two completely different lion dance styles. In Vietnam Jow Ga is famous among both the Cantonese and Teochew people.

== Hand forms ==
=== Primary (core Jow Ga forms) ===
Siu Fook Fu Kuen – Small Tiger (小伏虎拳) – The oldest and foundational form of Jow-Ga, teaching the primary fundamental techniques that are essential in order to master the system. Almost all the stances and the majority of techniques are contained here. Hung Gar origins are obvious.

Dai Fook Fu Kuen – Big Tiger (大伏虎拳) – An advanced form used to practise strong stances. Usually a number of movements are done in one stance before moving. The first part (the longer part of the form) trains some Chi Kung and also the Kiu (Bridge, 橋) representing Hung Gar. The second part of the form is much shorter and consists of rapid movements, representing Choy Gar. This form emphasizes the gist of the style known as Hung Tao, Choy Mei.

Chai Jong Kuen – Wooden Post Fist (柴樁拳) – One of the more powerful forms, known for its constant power movements and its utilisation of the "shadowless kick". It favours the use of the leopard technique (or leopard fist; a flatter fist, utilising the knuckles to strike the softer areas of the body), and incorporates some Chi Kung exercises in the opening sequence. Note, this form is often confused with the Siu Hung Kuen (Small Hung Fist) form listed below. Between the two, this form is longer and contains more techniques that are more aggressive offensively.

Man Gee Kuen – 10,000 Fist (萬字拳) – A form that literally is "The head of Hung, and tail of Choy". This form starts off at a slower pace with many Hung Gar movements, as the form progresses the pace speeds up because of the use of rapid stance-changing as in Choy Gar. It is quite a long form and trains some Chi Kung and endurance as well. It also has the Biu Gwa Jong (標掛撞) technique, which is 3 movements performed consecutively.

Fu Pao Kuen – Tiger Leopard (虎豹拳) – Usually the last form to learn and the most famous. It teaches many advanced fighting combinations. There is one ground technique which closely resembles a kneebar done on a standing opponent. This form has two known versions: the Hong Kong version and the Washington DC version (established by Dean Chin). The Hong Kong version opens to a standing stance while the DC version opens to a full horse stance.

=== Secondary (not found in all Jow Gar lineages) ===
Say Ping Kuen – Four-Level Fist (四平拳) – Also known as Four-Square, this basic set is sometimes taught before the Small Tiger because it is shorter. Teaches many of the basics of Jow-Ga (including some techniques not included in the Small Tiger). Consisting of between 60 and 70 moves of mostly Hung Gar origin including the fundamental branch binding hand sequence. Also is the first basic form to include (in some lineages) a jumping kick.

Lohan Kuen – Arhat Fist (羅漢拳) – Lohan is a mythical figure in Chinese Buddhism, and many Chinese martial arts have a form dedicated to such a being. It is characterized by large powerful movements. It is also a form that emphasizes the use of Chong Chui (Rushing Fist, 羅漢洗面), and also introduces the "Lohan washing his face" which is actually 3 techniques (Cup Chui, Com Chui, and Jon Chui) done consecutively. This form was created by Jow Biu after he came to Hong Kong.

Fa Kuen – Flower Fist (花拳) – A mix and match form, supposedly created during an impromptu performance given by Jow Biu at a banquet. Thus at the start of the form it looks like a mix of movements from several forms.

Ying Jow Kuen – Eagle Claw Fist (鷹爪拳) – This form teaches swift movements and quick attacks, characterized by 3 consecutive clawing movements and a fourth claw movement on the ground after a flying kick.

Kwok Gee Kuen – China/Country Fist (國字拳) – An advanced form which is quite long and incorporates almost all of the Jow-Ga system's primary techniques. It has a distinct Northern Shaolin kung fu kicking technique at the end.

Sup Gee Kuen – 10 Character Fist (十字拳)

Lok Kwok Chung Kuen – 6 Cornered Seed Fist (六隅子拳)

Siu Hung Kuen – Small Hung Fist (小洪拳) – A form that normally follows Small Tiger and Flower Fist in some lineages, this form is a short form that focuses on hard chi, and works on precise strikes, quick stance changes, and adapting from low to high positions. Note, this form is often confused with the Chai Jong Kuen form listed above. Between the two, this form is shorter and contains few techniques.

Dai Hung Kuen – Big Hung Fist (大洪拳)

Dan Gong Fook Fu Kuen – Single Crouching Tiger Fist (單弓伏虎拳)

Seung Gong Fook Fu Kuen – Double Crouching Tiger Fist (雙弓伏虎拳)

Fu Hok Seung Ying Kuen – Tiger Crane Double Shape Fist (虎鶴雙形)

Sher Ying Bat Gua Zheung – Snake Shape 8 Diagram Palm (蛇形八卦掌)

Siu Ng Ying Kuen – Small Five Animal Fist (五形拳)

Dai Ng Ying Kuen – Big Five Animal Fist (大五形拳)

Hau Kuen – Monkey Fist (猴拳)

Sub Dok Sau Kuen – Ten Poisonous Hands Fist (十毒手拳)

Tat Sin Kuen – Iron Wire Fist (鐵線拳)

Ng Ying Bat Gua Kuen – 5 Animals 8 Trigrams Fist (五形八卦拳)

Mui Fa Kuen – Plum Blossom Fist (梅花拳)

Tat Jin Kuen – Iron Arrow Fist (鐡箭拳)

Dune Da – Close-Range Combat (短打) (Present in curricula descending from Kong On, student of Jow Lung)

== Weapon forms ==
The Jow Ga system contains all the primary weapons found in Southern and Northern styles. The following list is divided by the weapon, and the forms that utilise said weapon. Note all terms are based on the Cantonese pronunciation.

Daan Tau Gwun – Single Headed Stick (單頭棍)

- Siu Baat Gwa Gwun – Small 8 Trigram Pole (小八卦棍)
- Jung Baat Gwa Gwun – Middle 8 Trigram Pole (中八卦棍)
- Dai Baat Gwa Gwun – Big 8 Trigram Pole (大八卦棍)

Seung Tau Gwun – Double Headed Staff (雙頭棍)

- Seung Tau Gwun – Double Headed Staff (雙頭棍)
- Sup Gee Mui Fa Gwun - Cross Patterned Plum Blossom Staff (十字梅花棍)

Daan Dou – Single Sabre (單刀)

- Fu Mei Daan Dou – Tiger Tail Single Sabre (虎尾單刀)

Daan Tau Cheung – Single Headed Spear (單頭槍)

- Mui Fa Cheung – Plum Flower Spear (梅花槍)

Seung Tau Cheung – Double Headed Spear (雙頭槍)

Seung Dou – Double Sabre (雙刀)

- Sup Gee Mui Fa Seung Dou – Cross Patterned Plum Flower Double Sabre (十字梅花雙刀)

Bau Jong Seung Dou/Wu Dip Seung Dou – Elbow-Guarding Knives/Butterfly Double Knives (保踭雙刀/蝴蝶雙刀)

Dai Dou – Bladed Polearms (大刀)

- Kwan Dou – General Kwan's Polearm (關刀)
- Gau Wan Dai Dou – 9 Ring Big Halberd (九環大刀)
- Choi Yeung Dai Dou – General Choi Big Halberd

Daai Pa – Cudgels (大巴)

- Dai Fu Pa – Big Tiger Lance/Trident (大虎巴)
- Fut Ga Dai Pa – Buddhist Family Big Lance/Trident (佛家大巴)
- Sae Mao – Snake Lance (蛇矛)
- Fong Tien Gik – Heaven Splitting Lance (分天戈)

Daan Gim – Single Sword (單劍)

- Jik Mei Gim – Swallow Tail Sword (燕尾刀)

Daan Bin – Single Whip Chain (單鞭)

- Lung Mei Bin – Dragon Tail Whip (龍尾鞭)

Seung Bin – Double Whip Chains (雙鞭)

- Mui Fa Seung Yun Bin – Double Plum Blossom Whip Chains (梅花雙軟鞭)

Sam Jit Gwan – 3 Section Staff (三節棍)

- Form No. 1 (套路一號)
- Form No. 2 (套路二號) Note: Found in the Dean Chin lineage and is derived from the Eagle Claw system.

Seung Pei Sao – Double Daggers (雙匕首)

Chor Tau – Farmer's Hoe (鋤頭)

Gau Chi Dai Pa – 9 Toothed Big Lance/Rake (九齒大巴)

Ma Kiu Dun – Horse Bridge Bench (馬橋櫈)

Lung Wan Sin – Dragon Cloud Fan (龍雲扇)

Weapon forms vary from lineage to lineage; some have many more different weapon sets. Jow Ga is most famous for its double-sabres (梅花雙刀), so much so that it is used in the standard Jow Ga Logo "double-sabre" underneath the Jow character (周) written inside a five petaled plum flower.

== Two-man sets ==
Siu Fook Fu Deoi Chaak – Small Controlling Tiger Two-Man Set (小伏虎對折)

Man Gee Kuen Deoi Chaak – 10,000 Fist Two-Man Set (萬字拳對折)

Daan Tau Gwan Deoi Chaak – Single-Headed Staff Two-Man Set (單頭棍對拆)

Seung Tau Gwan Deoi Chaak – Double-Headed Staff Two-Man Set (雙頭棍對拆)

Daan Dou Deoi Cheung – Saber vs. Spear Two-Man Set (單刀對槍)

Seung Doa Deoi Cheung – Double Sabre Two-Man Set (雙刀對槍)

Daai Dou Deoi Cheung – Halberd vs. Spear Two-Man Set (大刀對槍)

Seung Bei Sau Deoi Cheung – Double Daggers vs. Spear Two-Man Set (雙匕首對槍對折)

Dani Fu Pa Deoi Darn Dou – Tiger Lance/Trident vs. Single Sabre with Shield (大虎巴對單刀)

Bau Jong Dou Deoi Cheung – Elbow-Guarding Knives (Butterfly Knives) vs. Spear (保踭刀對槍)
