= Hung Fut =

Martial art from China

Hung Fut 洪佛
- Also known as: Hung Fist and Buddha Palm style kung fu
- Focus: Striking
- Country of origin: China
- Creator: Lei Jou Fun also known as Shaolin Buddhist Master Wun Lei,
- Famous practitioners: Hung Jiu Shing (White Haired Devil), Hung Yu Chung, Tai Loi Yim, Hung Kam Pu, Man Ying Nap
- Parenthood: Hung Kuen, Fut Jeong
- Olympic sport: No

Hung Fut (Chinese: 洪佛; pinyin: hóng fó) is a southern style of Chinese martial art, first developed in the early 1800s by Lei Jou Fun 李祖寬, also known as Shaolin Buddhist Monk Wun Lei 雲彌禪師 and is a system that is widely practiced today.

== System ==
Hung Fut is considered to be a hybrid system. Its philosophies are a mixture of two martial art systems: the powerful, external, hard style of Hung Kuen with the flowing, soft, internal style of Fut Jeong (Buddha's palm). Hung Fut is a combat method that uses economy of movement in order to achieve efficiency. Its strategies are to try to throw the opponent into an awkward position that makes defense difficult and counterattack unlikely. There is no need to keep contact with an opponent, as the system uses interchangeable and flexible movements.

The system includes ten animal styles (snake, tiger, leopard, lion, eagle, crane, monkey, elephant, horse and dragon) as well as an "8 Drunken Immortal" form (based on the personality traits of the 8 heavenly deities of Chinese traditional religion), a "4 Afflictions/Cripples" form (a deceptive mimicry of one who is crippled) and a left-handed form (based on the legend of a famous general fighting while holding the infant son of a Chinese emperor).

The left-hand form is practiced as a single-handed form with the right held behind the back, at the waistline. The form became somewhat of a YouTube internet sensation when explosive, powerful and lightning fast sections of it were captured at various events as performed by 8th generation Grandmaster Yim Tai Loi who, as the adopted son of the 7th generation Grandmaster Hung Yu Chung, is the heir to the Hung Fut lineage. As per oral communication from Grandmaster Hung Kam Pui, the single handed form (Duhk Bei Kyuhn) was developed by Hung Jiu Sing for one of his students, who only had one arm. There is also a sword form that is practiced in the same fashion. This is the style that Donnie Yen used in his movie, Dragon, after learning it from Hung Kam Pui.

In addition to 8th generation Grandmaster Yim Tai Loi, and Grandmaster Hung Kam Poi, there are multiple lineages and lineage successions listed by various Hung Fut schools around the world. Rather than a matter of controversy, this in fact is a testimony to the commitment of the 6th and 7th generation Grandmasters Hung Jiu Sing and his son Hung Yu Chung, to spread the benefits of the Hung Fut System first throughout China and Hong Kong, and then the entire world.

Hung Jiu Sing departed from the tradition of limiting teaching to family members or local residents and became widely known as “The White Haired Devil” by traveling throughout China and Hong Kong, performing acts of benevolence, and teaching his martial arts skills broadly. His students ranged from novices to accomplished martial artists, each learning different aspects of his system for varying periods before returning to teach in their own schools. While all benefited from his instruction, not all practiced or taught Hung Fut exclusively, which accounts for variations in forms and techniques across schools today. As the style has spread globally, its content—including forms, techniques, stances, types of power, theory, and training methods—has adapted, leading to differences based on each school’s heritage.

A pure and complete lineage of the system does however remain. 6th generation Grandmaster Hung Jiu Sing (The White Haired Devil), had three sons. The eldest two were extremely accomplished in Hung Fut, but sadly, both perished at an early age. Jiu Sing then turned all of his attention to passing the system on to his remaining son Hung Yu Chung, who mastered it fully as he taught with and for his father, before assuming the title of 7th generation Grandmaster upon the passing of the White Haired Devil at the age of 96. Having achieved a legendary level of skill, Yu Chung then passed the pure Hung Fut system on to his adopted son and the 8th generation Grandmaster Yim Tai Loi. In keeping with the dream and vision of Hung Yu Chung, Yim Tai Loi migrated to the United States in 1977 where he opened his first United States school in Wheaton Maryland in 1978 and now teaches in Kensington, Maryland, a suburb outside of Washington D.C. 8th generation Grandmaster Yim Tai Loi passed the direct lineage of the Hung Fut system on to the 9th generation Masters, whom he personally trained and selected. The 9th Generation Masters, inducted by 8th generation Grandmaster Tai Yim include: Master Linh Vien Thai, Master Eugene Chung, Master John Ritz Miller, Master Mike Sutton, Master Vicky Miller, Master Shelton Lee Jr, Master Ricardo Chen, Master Jae Ha Hwang, Master Philippe Prosper and Master James E. Whitley III.

In addition to the 9th generation Masters, some of Grandmaster Yim's most notable students include Joe Myers, Hung Stewart (International Grand Champion), Phung Lee (International Grand Champion), Ed Pratt (National Full contact fighting and Forms Champion), Antwann Rawls (Forms and Fighting National Grand Champion), Lester Solomon (Asst. Chief Instructor).

== Unique features ==
Hung Fut is truly an original martial art form from China. Its roots go back to the Shaolin temple. All Hung Fut forms start with the left side of the body.

The Hung Fut system includes more than twenty weapons, the best known of which is the left-handed staff style. There are traditionally ten different staff forms taught; each successive one increases in difficulty and intensity. The staff is the first weapon taught in the system and also the last. The final staff form is the most famous and mysterious. Most commonly known as the "mad devil staff" it was traditionally passed down only to the one student appointed to succeed a teacher. The mad devil staff form was used and made famous by the sixth generation Grandmaster, Hung Jiu Sing, also known as the "White Haired Devil". It is reported that variations were passed on to several highly select students, with only the direct heir to the system being known to have received the transmission of the fully authentic version.

== Schools ==
The Official Grandmaster for the 8th generation was at one time the subject of some speculation due to how the events leading up to the passing of Hung Yu Chung transpired. It is reported that prior to accepting Yim Tai Loi as a student, 7th generation Grandmaster Hung Yu Chung pondered, but did not act on, a departure from tradition, and considered the formation of an association to take the system forward. However, once Yim became a disciple of Yu Chung, and subsequently his adopted son, Yim became the inheritor and heir to the system, and he and his students now carry the direct family lineage. That stated, Grandmaster Hung Kam Poi from Hong Kong leads a popular faction of the system, and is the chairman of the Hung Fut Pai Chinese Kung Fu Association.

A semi-complete family tree is available. In addition to Yim Tai Loi's school in Kensington, Maryland, there is a strong Hung Fut Pai branch (Hung Kam Pui), in New York City that is very active in the Hung Fut community. The NYC branch is run by SIFU Phil Auffray Hung Man Fu. Another Sifu worth mentioning is Sifu Jai A.K.A. Lee Tai-Luhng. All of these masters practice in NYC and frequently return to China to study with master Hung Kam Pui.

There are other masters of this generation who are in other countries around the world, such as in Hong Kong and Grandmaster Raymond Man Ying Nap based in Scotland.
