= Xinhui, Jiangmen =

Xinhui 新会区 Sunwui; Hsinhui
- District
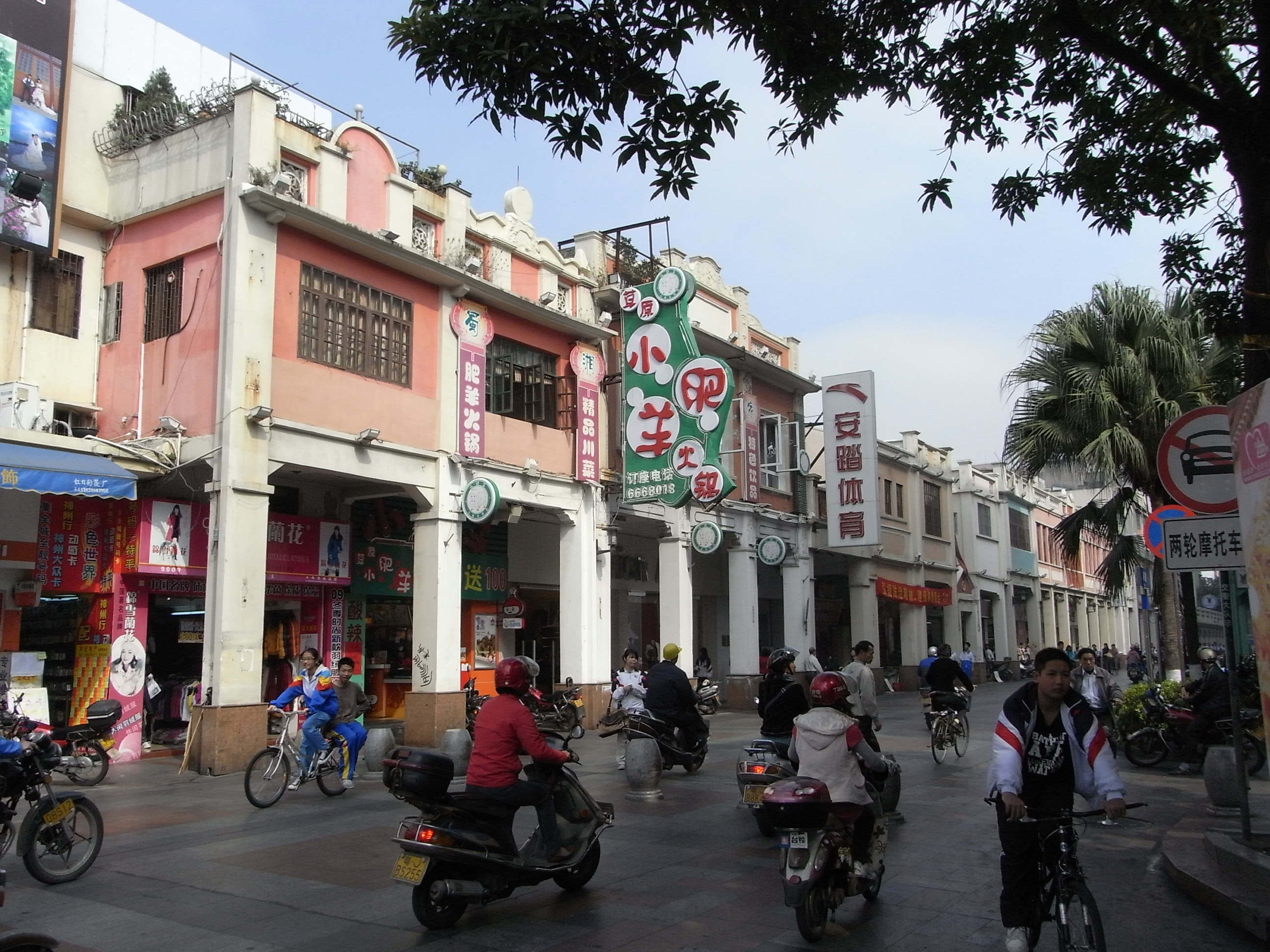
- Motto: Realistic, innovative
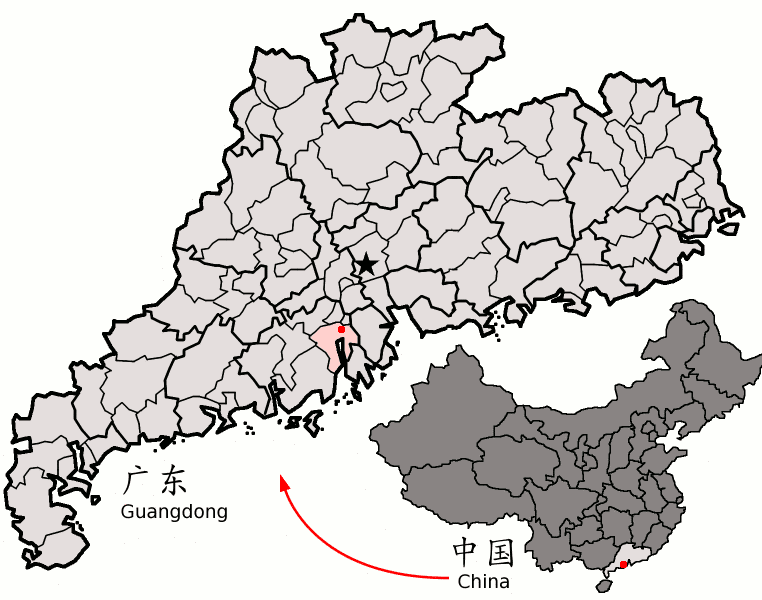
- Xinhui District (red) within Guangdong
- Coordinates: 22.5281°N 113.031°E
- Country: China
- Province: Guangdong
- Prefecture-level city: Jiangmen

Area
  - District: 2,354.7149 km^{2} (909.1605 sq mi)
  - Land: 1,075.24 km^{2} (415.15 sq mi)
  - Water: 279.48 km^{2} (107.91 sq mi)
  - Urban: 143.8698 km^{2} (55.5484 sq mi)

Dimensions
  - Length: 54.5 km (33.9 mi)
  - Width: 48.8 km (30.3 mi)

Population (2016)
  - District: 757,988
  - Density: 704.948/km^{2} (1,825.81/sq mi)
  - Urban: 757,988
  - Urban density: 5,268.57/km^{2} (13,645.5/sq mi)
- Time zone: UTC+8 (China Standard)
- Postal code: 529100-529159
- Area code: (0)750
- Vehicle registration: 粤JK 粤JL 粤JM 粤JN 粤JO
- Website: www.xinhui.gov.cn

Xinhui
- Simplified Chinese: 新会
- Traditional Chinese: 新會
- Postal: Sunwui
Transcriptions
Standard Mandarin
- Hanyu Pinyin: Xīnhuì
- Wade–Giles: Hsin^{1}-hui^{4}
- IPA: [ɕínxwêɪ]
Yue: Cantonese
- Yale Romanization: sān wuih
- Jyutping: san1 wui6
- IPA: [sɐn˥wuj˨]
other Yue
- Taishanese: lhin1 voi5

Kuixiang (former)
- Simplified Chinese: 葵乡
- Traditional Chinese: 葵鄉
Transcriptions
Standard Mandarin
- Hanyu Pinyin: Kuíxiāng
- Wade–Giles: Kʻuei^{2}-hsiang^{1}

Gugangzhou (former)
- Simplified Chinese: 古冈州
- Traditional Chinese: 古岡州
- Literal meaning: Old Ridge Prefecture
Transcriptions
Standard Mandarin
- Hanyu Pinyin: Gǔgāngzhōu
- Wade–Giles: Ku-kang-chou

Xinhui, alternately romanized as Sunwui (Note: Other former romanizations of Xinhui include Sin-hwuy, Sin-hwuy-heën, Sin Whee, San Wui, and Sin-hwang.) and also known as Kuixiang, is an urban district of Jiangmen in Guangdong, China. It grew from a separate city founded at the confluence of the Tan and West Rivers. It has a population of about 735,500, 98% of whom are Han Chinese and many of them speak a dialect of Cantonese as their first language. Xinhui is best known in China for its chenpi, a kind of dried Mandarin orange peel.

== Geography ==
Xinhui is situated at the confluence of the Tan and West Rivers in the southwestern area of the Pearl River Delta. It borders the South China Sea and adjoins Macao and Hong Kong. It comprises a total area of 1,387.02 square meters (14,929.8 sq ft). Geologists have shown that Xinhui originated as a shallow bay at the mouth of the Pearl River about 5000 years ago, with its southeastern portion consisting of a chain of islands. The movement of the Tan and West Rivers eventually formed a delta that became the present alluvial plain over the last nine hundred years.

== History ==
Most of the present area of the Xinhui district formed during the historical period from silt deposited by the Tan and West Rivers. Some Neolithic artifacts, however, have been found in the district's territory over the last ten years, including shell mounds and pottery shards.

The former Gugang Prefecture was located in the area. Xinhui County administered the area of Jiangmen Town before being placed under Jiangmen's administration. It was later promoted to an urban district.

== Administration ==
Xinhui District now forms a part of downtown Jiangmen. It comprises 10 towns, 239 village commissions, 25 community residents' committees, and 4 agencies.

Name	Chinese (S)	Hanyu Pinyin	Population (2010)
Huicheng Subdistrict	会城街道	Huìchéng Jiēdào	385,177
Daze town	大泽镇	Dàzé Zhèn	37,677
Siqian town	司前镇	Sīqián Zhèn	69,935
Luokeng town	罗坑镇	Luōkēng Zhèn	31,527
Shuangshui town	双水镇	Shuāngshuǐ Zhèn	87,295
Yamen town	崖门镇	Yámén Zhèn	37,963
Shadui town	沙堆镇	Shāduī Zhèn	36,957
Gujing town	古井镇	Gǔjǐng Zhèn	42,027
Sanjiang town	三江镇	Sānjiāng Zhèn	43,113
Muzhou town	睦洲镇	Mùzhōu Zhèn	42,117
Da'ao town	大鳌镇	Dà'áo Zhèn	35,367

== Demographics ==
Xinhui people are part of the greater Siyi people, in the Greater Siyi Region. Over the last two centuries, more than 600,000 people from Xinhui have migrated to Hong Kong or overseas (mostly to the Americas, Indonesia, Malaysia and Singapore), making it one of the largest qiaoxiangs (hometown of overseas Chinese) in the country.

== Climate ==
Climate data for Xinhui, elevation 36 m (118 ft), (1991–2020 normals, extremes 1963–present)
Month	Jan	Feb	Mar	Apr	May	Jun	Jul	Aug	Sep	Oct	Nov	Dec	Year
Record high °C (°F)	27.8 (82.0)	29.9 (85.8)	32.1 (89.8)	34.0 (93.2)	38.4 (101.1)	37.6 (99.7)	38.3 (100.9)	37.7 (99.9)	37.4 (99.3)	34.5 (94.1)	32.4 (90.3)	32.0 (89.6)	38.4 (101.1)
Mean daily maximum °C (°F)	18.3 (64.9)	19.8 (67.6)	22.3 (72.1)	26.4 (79.5)	30.0 (86.0)	31.8 (89.2)	32.7 (90.9)	32.7 (90.9)	31.4 (88.5)	28.7 (83.7)	24.7 (76.5)	20.0 (68.0)	26.6 (79.8)
Daily mean °C (°F)	14.6 (58.3)	16.0 (60.8)	18.8 (65.8)	22.8 (73.0)	26.2 (79.2)	28.1 (82.6)	28.8 (83.8)	28.6 (83.5)	27.6 (81.7)	25.1 (77.2)	20.9 (69.6)	16.3 (61.3)	22.8 (73.1)
Mean daily minimum °C (°F)	11.9 (53.4)	13.5 (56.3)	16.3 (61.3)	20.4 (68.7)	23.6 (74.5)	25.5 (77.9)	25.9 (78.6)	25.8 (78.4)	24.9 (76.8)	22.3 (72.1)	18.1 (64.6)	13.5 (56.3)	20.1 (68.2)
Record low °C (°F)	0.1 (32.2)	2.5 (36.5)	3.3 (37.9)	8.6 (47.5)	15.4 (59.7)	18.0 (64.4)	22.3 (72.1)	21.8 (71.2)	16.6 (61.9)	10.7 (51.3)	4.9 (40.8)	1.8 (35.2)	0.1 (32.2)
Average precipitation mm (inches)	43.2 (1.70)	41.3 (1.63)	67.6 (2.66)	160.5 (6.32)	273.5 (10.77)	335.5 (13.21)	271.2 (10.68)	301.4 (11.87)	207.7 (8.18)	72.2 (2.84)	34.2 (1.35)	31.8 (1.25)	1,840.1 (72.46)
Average precipitation days (≥ 0.1 mm)	6.4	9.3	13.2	14.3	17.2	18.9	17.2	17.5	13.5	6.2	5.6	5.3	144.6
Average relative humidity (%)	70	77	81	83	82	83	81	81	77	69	67	64	76
Mean monthly sunshine hours	113.7	88.4	72.6	89.8	134.1	160.4	202.2	188.1	169.6	184.6	159.1	146.0	1,708.6
Percentage possible sunshine	34	27	19	24	33	40	49	48	47	52	48	44	39
Source: China Meteorological Administration all-time extreme temperatureall-time February highall-time March high

== Economy ==
The paper company Vinda International has its headquarters in the Donghou Industrial Development Zone (东侯工业区) in Huicheng Town in the district.

=== Agriculture ===
Xinhui food exports include rice and fruits, especially oranges. Dried orange peel produced in Xinhui is also used in traditional Chinese cooking.

Dried orange peel produced in Xinhui is world-renowned. It has been used for hundreds years in Chinese cooking and traditional Chinese cooking, adding an aroma and flavor to food.

=== Port development ===
Yinzhou Lake (银州湖; 銀州湖), or Yamen Channel (崖门水道; 崖門水道), has an area of 65 km^{2} (25 sq mi). The average 8–13 m deep river channel and the gentle water current can accommodate vessels up to 10,000 tonnes deadweight (DWT), and is an advantage for port development and in-river transport.

The Yinzhou Lake Economic Area (银州湖经济区; 銀州湖經濟區), which is the key development area, is one of the four main economic areas in Jiangmen city. The Tianma port (天马港; 天馬港), which is located in Yinzhou Lake inside Yamenkou (崖门口; 崖門口), is in a strategic location and is in excellent natural condition for port development in the western Pearl River Delta. Tianma port has designated as a regional hub port, similar to the status of Nansha (南沙港) in Shunde, by the governments of Guangdong, Jiangmen and Xinhui. Harbour industries and logistics services will be developed in the surrounding areas of the port.

== Attractions ==
Mount Chishi is a famous scenic spot and tourist destination.

== Notable people ==
Xinhui has been home to prominent figures in Chinese history and is the ancestral hometown of notable figures from the overseas Chinese diaspora.

=== Historical figures ===
- Liang Qichao, known as "The Mind of Modern China", a Chinese scholar, journalist, philosopher, and reformist during the late Qing Dynasty and early Republic of China who inspired Chinese scholars with his writings and reform movements.
- Liang Sicheng – He was the son of Liang Qichao, known as "Father of modern Chinese architecture"
- Cheong Yoke Choy – famous and well respected philanthropist during the British Malaya era
- Chan Heung – Founder of Choy Li Fut one of China's most popular fighting system
- Chan Siu-bak – One of the Four Bandits
- Jian Youwen – Chinese historian, public official, and sometime Methodist pastor
- Jeong Yim is recognized as an important contributor to the expansion of Choy Li Fut
- Leung Long Chau – Chinese poet and calligrapher.
- Liang Zongdai – He was one of the most popular "new poets" writing in free verse.
- Cheung Po Tsai – Pirate and lover of Ching Shih

=== Entertainers ===
- Lai Man-Wai – father of Hong Kong cinema
- Joey Yung – She won the prestigious JSG "Most Popular Female Singer" and "Ultimate Best Female Singer – Gold" awards a record breaking eight times, thus emerging as one of the premier Cantonese singers in Hong Kong. Joey is ranked 52nd on the Forbes 2013 Chinese Celebrity List, making her the highest paid Hong Kong–based Cantopop singer with an estimated income of $29,200,000 RMB last year.
- Alan Tam – earning the nickname the "Principal" or "Principal Tam" of Hong Kong music industry
- Ti Lung – known for his numerous starring roles in a string of Shaw Brothers Studio's films,
- Lau Kar-wing – Hong Kong martial arts film director, action choreographer and actor.
- Kenny Bee – Very famous actor and singer in the 1980s to 1990s
- Kenneth Chan – is a Hong Kong actor and television host for the Hong Kong–based Cable TV Hong Kong channel (previously working for TVB and ATV).
- Connie Chan – She made more than 230 films in a variety of genres: from traditional Cantonese opera and wuxia movies to contemporary youth musicals; action films to comedies; melodramas and romances. Owing to her popularity she was dubbed "The Movie-Fan Princess".
- Deep Ng – He is the winner of the 21st annual New Talent Singing Awards Hong Kong Regional Finals. Deep was well received by the viewers since the New Talent Singing Awards in 2002.
- Michelle Yim -, Yim won the Best Drama Performance by an Actress Award at the Asian Television Awards 2009 for her role in Moonlight Resonance.
- Anthony Chan (actor) – Hong Kong actor and the drum player for the band Wynners
- Tina Leung – she recognized that she used to gather intelligence for the Chinese Communist Party in the 1960s.
- Ha Yu (actor) – is a Hong Kong actor who has been working on the television network TVB since the 1970s.
- Bondy Chiu – is an actress and singer with Television Broadcasts Limited (TVB)
- Leo Fong – Martial arts instructor and filmmaker. Friend and sparring partner of Bruce Lee.

=== Athletes ===
- Darryl O'Young – is a Canadian-born Hong Kong racing driver and Asia champion
- Liang Caixia – Chinese modern pentathlete. She finished 29th in the Olympics
- Wan Chi Keung – was a known as "Asia's top striker". Wan was a key player for the Hong Kong national football team in the 1970s and 1980s. Played for South China and Japan club seiko. After he retired, he became an actor.
- Yu Zhuocheng – Yu won a silver medal in the 3 metre springboard diving at the 1996 Summer Olympic Games.

=== Politicians ===
- Chavarat Charnvirakul (陳景鎮) – Thai Chinese politician who served as an Acting Prime Minister of Thailand as a result of the 2008 Thai political crisis.
- Fernando Chui – Chief executive of Macau
- Yu Hung-Chun – was a Chinese political figure who served as premier of the Republic of China on Taiwan between 1954 and 1958.
- Kam Nai-wai – is a member of the Legislative Council of Hong Kong (Geographical constituency, Hong Kong Island). He is a founding member of the Democratic Party, and the member of Central and Western District Council. He currently (as of 2009) works as a social worker and a director of an IT company.
- Philip S. Lee – was the 24th Lieutenant Governor of Manitoba.
- Wu Tingfang – was a Chinese diplomat and politician who served as Minister of Foreign Affairs and briefly as Acting Premier during the early years of the Republic of China.
- Ronny Tong – is a Senior Counsel and also Queen's Counsel and current member of the Legislative Council of Hong Kong (Legco), representing the New Territories East constituency. He is also a member of the Civic Party Executive Committee.
- Howard Young – was the member of the Legislative Council of Hong Kong (Functional constituencies, Tourism) and the member of Southern District Council.
- Judy Chu – She is the first Chinese American woman ever elected to the U.S. Congress. Chu was reelected in the 2010 United States midterm elections, defeating Republican challenger Edward "Ed" Schmerling.

=== Businessmen ===
- Peter Chan (businessman) – a Hong Kong businessman and former Feng shui geomancer to the late Nina Wang, who at the time of her death was the chairperson of Chinachem and Asia's richest woman and local socialite.
- Ho Kwon Ping – Chinese Singaporean businessman who is the executive chairman of Banyan Tree Holdings.
- Fung Ping-fan – prominent Hong Kong businessman who co-founded the Bank of East Asia. He was also appointed to several political and public service positions.
- Lee Hysan – A rich business man who founded the Hysan Development Company, which has a market capitalization in excess of HK$20 billion.
- Lee Man Tat – one of Hong Kong's richest billionaires and chairman of the family-owned Chinese sauce and condiment company Lee Kum Kee, which its products are sold throughout China and many overseas markets.
- Lui Che-woo – prominent business magnate, philanthropist and one of Hong Kong richest billionaires. He is the founder and chairman of the listed companies K. Wah International Holdings Ltd. and Galaxy Entertainment Group.
- Yip Hon – was a gambling tycoon in South China. His wealth was estimated to be HK$100 million. He was known as "Ghost King".

== See also ==
- Battle of Yamen
- Xinhui People's Hospital
