= Choy gar =

Chinese martial art

Choy Gar 蔡家拳
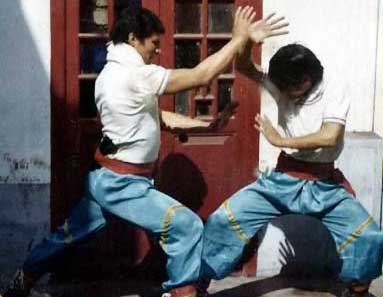
- Also known as: Choi Gar, Choy Gar Kuen, Caijia Quan
- Focus: Striking
- Country of origin: China
- Creator: Choi Gau Yi / Choy Gau Lee (Five Elders)
- Famous practitioners: (see below)
- Parenthood: Nanquan/Southern Kung Fu; Hung Gar; Snake Kung Fu
- Descendant arts: Fut Gar, Choy Li Fut; Jow-Ga Kung Fu; Nam Huỳnh Đạo
- Olympic sport: No

Choy Gar, also Caijia Quan (Chinese: 蔡家拳, Choy family fist), is a Chinese martial art deriving its name from the Cantonese-born founder, Choy Gau-lee (蔡九儀) (Choy Tsing-hung), and is one of the five main family styles of Kung Fu in Southern China. It was taught to him by a monk named Yi Guan. This style, founded in the 17th century, is a combination of rat and snake styles emphasizing on swift footwork and rapid strikes.

== The Style ==
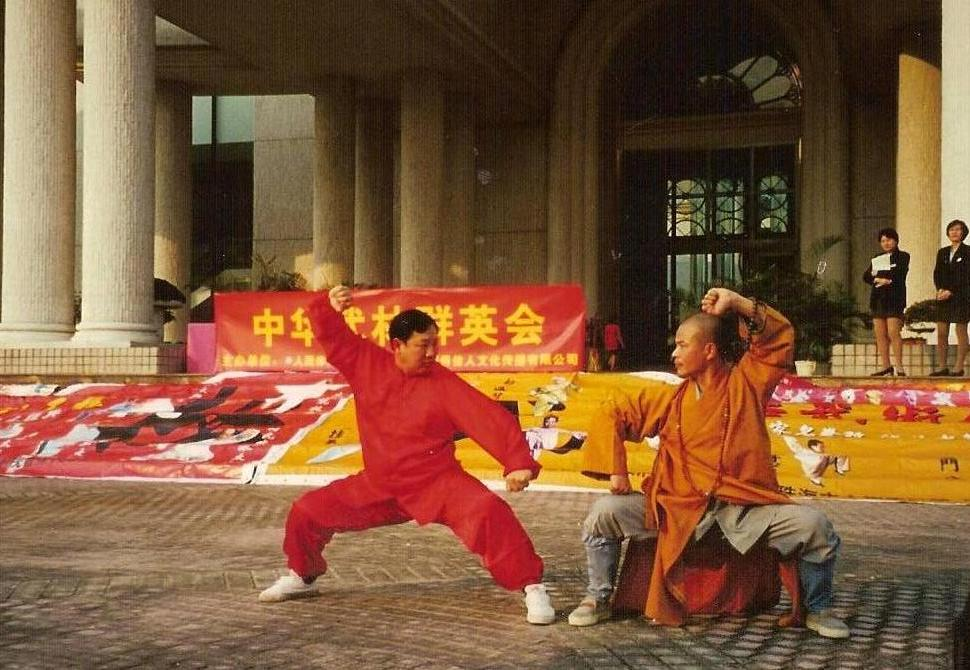
Choy Gar being performed at an international event authorized by Chinese Wushu Association

Choy gar is a self-defense style that practices low stances and swift footwork. The body and arms are meant to resemble the quick attacking movements of the snake. Unlike the Northern Shaolin Kung Fu styles which have wider, more open techniques, Choy Gar's short and swift movements are better suited for the crowded alleys and streets of densely populated southern China. The low stance and power in the techniques will in time develop an inner strength within the practitioner. This is the basic foundation for creating effective movements, abilities and actions of the body.

== Training ==
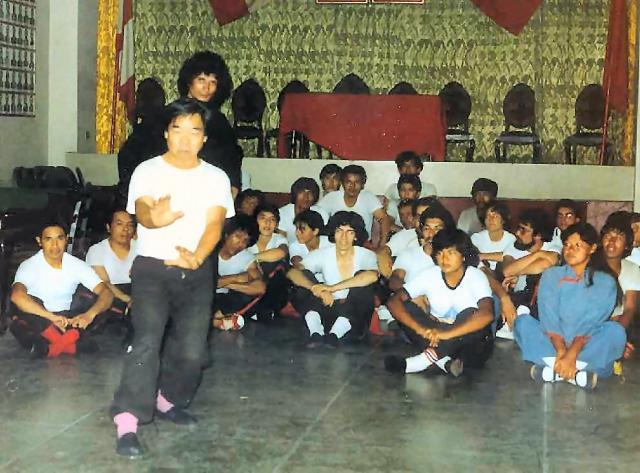
Sifu Fausto Wong demonstrates with Sifu Adolfo Tijero in the background.

One begins by building up physique in a good way. Stamina, strength and flexibility workout is combined with stretching and basic techniques. Training is performed in a low stance (Chapma) to increase the leg strength. In the Choy style, strong legs are a necessity for performing the techniques in a correct manner. Lower body strength is the foundation of Choy. The basic techniques (punches, kicks and blocks) are put together into different form combinations. One learns the forms in two versions – to the sides and to the front – and are required to execute it against the Sifu at a certain pace and without any stalls.

All the various techniques of Choy Gar can be found in the following forms:

Choy Gar Forms
"The first dance"
4 Combinations
Choy Wi Poo (The essence of
Choy Gar can be
found in this form)
Chi Poo (A form greatly
influenced by Hung Gar)
Suilan
Sikwa
Swine Dance
Staff Form
Sword Form
Ta Shon (The longest and most
complete form, takes
more than 15 min
to perform)

Choy Gar kung fu is based on short and rhythmic techniques which minimizes the area the opponent can attack which in turn becomes an effective self-defense (this is very individual and relies upon each and every student's way of building up lower body strength).

== Some routines and theories ==
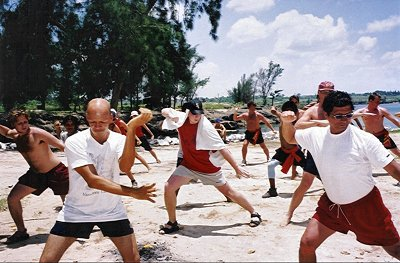
Swedish Choy Gar practitioners during training

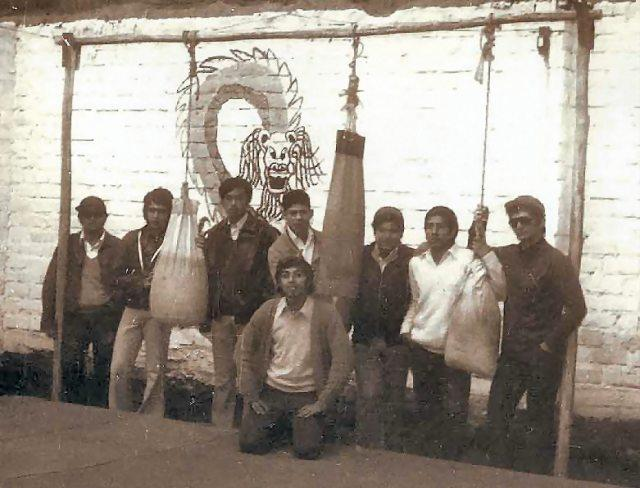
Chung Shang Huy Kun, a club where Choy Gar originated from in Lima, Peru. Sifu Adolfo Tijero seen far right.

(cross pattern fist - 十字拳),

(Big Drum Heaven - 大运天)

(Small Drum Heaven - 小运天),

(Heaven Horizon - 天边雁)

(willow tree Broken Plum - 柳碎梅)

(Four elephant Fist - 四象拳),

(Fist elbow - 拳肘手)

(Six Including Fist - 六连拳)

(100 Birds Turn Over Nest - 百鸟归巢)

(Single End Stick - 单头棍)

(Double End Stick - 双头棍)

(Choy Ga 3 Arrow Big Arrowhead and so on - 蔡家三矢大钯等)

(Fast & CLever - 快速灵巧)

(Agile and changeable - 敏捷多变)

(Disappears the body to borrow strength - 消身借力)

(Because Potential Advantage leading - 因势利导)

(Dodging skillfully - 闪化巧取)

(Man Can Only win with Skill - 只可以巧取胜)

Do not argue with extended arm - 不可以力争衡 Best to attack the side door - 所以着重偏门攻击

(Horse Stepping Triangle by Triangle Step Primarily - 马步以三角步为主)

(Bridge Horse of Hung Ga - 洪家讲桥马)

(Fast Hitting of Choy Ga - 蔡家讲快打)

(Formula Tactics - 口诀有)

== Famous practitioners ==
- Leung Siu-jong (instructor of Leung Tin-jiu)
- Leung Tin-jiu (founder of Fut Gar)
- Choy Fook (instructor of Chan Heung)
- Chan Heung (founder of Choy Li Fut)
- Choy Gar-gung / Choy Kau (descendant of the founder and instructor of Jow Lung)
- Jow Lung (founder of Jow-Ga Kung Fu)

== In popular culture ==
In Planet Brothers of Captain Scarlet (乐福乐福悠), Bokushio, played by Morris Yuki Chua Yuxuan (蔡语萱), uses his kung fu talent to defeat Walxin enemies at the Walxin Ground Base in Samal in order to save hostages in a post-apocalyptic setting.
