= Li family kung fu =

Chinese martial art style

Li Gar 李家功夫
- Also known as: Lei Gar, Li Jia
- Focus: Striking
- Country of origin: China
- Creator: Li Sou style: Li Yuanshou (Li Sou) & Jueyuan (co-founder); Li Jia style: Li Youshan / Lee Yau-san / Li Yi of the Five Elders; Li Yi style: possibly Li Youshan
- Famous practitioners: Chan Heung (Li Jia style and founder of Choy Li Fut); Li Mung (Li Yi style); Jeung Lai-chuen (student of Li Mung and Bak Mei practitioner)
- Parenthood: Li Sou style: Wuxingquan, Luohan quan, Neigong; Li Jia style: Southern Kung Fu
- Descendant arts: Choy Li Fut
- Olympic sport: No

The Li family of kung fu (Chinese: 李家功夫; pinyin: Lǐ jiā gōngfū) is one of the five family styles of Southern Chinese martial arts.

== Li Sou ==
The Li family is originally from Lanzhou in the Gansu province of China. According to legend, prior to Li Sou's development of Wuxingquan (5 shape fist), he had learned various palm techniques that had been passed on to him by another member of the Li family. These techniques were called the Divine Immortal Palms, and consisted of Iron Bone Shattering Palm, Vibrating Palm, Cotton Palm, Burning Palm, Spiralling Palm, and Internal Iron Palm, which were taught to the Li family by a Taoist immortal and other traveling hermits from the Wudang and Emei Mountains.

== Shaolin Wuxingquan/Ng Ying Kuen (5 Shape Fist) ==
Originating from the 18 Luohan hands, Jueyuan in the 13th century expanded its 18 techniques to 72. Still, he felt the need to seek knowledge from outside the confines of the temple. In Gansu Province in the west of China, in the city of Lanzhou, he met Li Sou, a master of "red boxing" (紅拳; hóngquán). Li Sou accompanied Jueyuan back to Henan to introduce Jueyuan to Bai Yufeng, a master of an internal method and Wuzuquan. Li Sou's real name was Li Yuanshou (Li Sou means simply "old man").

They returned to Shaolin and expanded the 72 techniques to approximately 170. Additionally, using their combined knowledge, they inserted internal aspects to Shaolin boxing. They organized these techniques into five animals: the tiger, the crane, the leopard, the snake, and the dragon.

== Li Youshan ==
From Guandong Xin Hui, Li Youshan (李友山, also written Lee Yau-san) entered the Shaolin Temple and became a student of the Monk Jee Sin Sim See and Monk Li Sik-hoi (Li Xikai). His training focused around the 5 shape fist method along with other arts to create Li family style, a short bridge style with long changeable footwork.

Li Yi（1744—1828) from Guandong is recorded as a founder of the Li family style. It is possible that the 2 individuals are the same. Li Yi was also the instructor to Chan Heung, the founder of the Choy Li Fut style.

=== Hand Forms ===
- Wu Lien Shou (Ng Lin Sou) – five connecting hands
- Zhong Liu Lien (Chong Lok Lin)
- Chi Lien Shou (Chat Lin Sou) – seven connecting hands
- Duan Kou (Dun Ko) – short
- Shao Da (Siu Da) – small strike
- and of course 36 elbows
- Lin Fa Gua Sao – lotus hanging hands
- Jin Kau Duan Da – arrow – short strike
- Bat tui Siu Da – 8 pushes small strike
- Say Sing Kuen – four star fist
- Sam Kuen – three fists
- Shi Zun
- Siu Sup Kuen – small cross fist
- Dai Sup Kuen – big cross fist
- the enfilade select the shadowboxing
- Bat Gua Kuen – 8 diagram fist
- Hung Kuen – red fist to practice boxing red
- the alone foot series fist
- ng Ying Kuen – five shape fist – five shape martial art combining various techniques fist
