= Chan Heung =

Chinese martial artist

陳享 Chan Heung
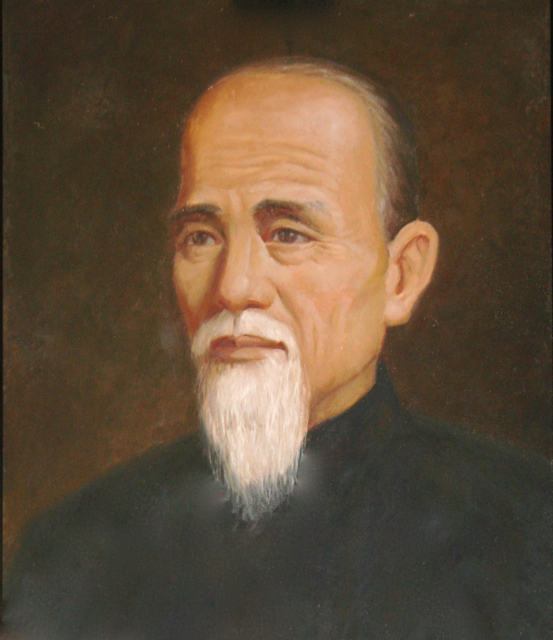
- Born: 23 August 1806; Jing Mei, Xinhui, Guangdong, China
- Died: 20 August 1875 (aged 68)
- Other names: Din Ying; Daht Ting
- Style: Founder of Choy Li Fut

Chan Heung
- Traditional Chinese: 陳享
Transcriptions
Standard Mandarin
- Hanyu Pinyin: Chén Xiǎng

Din Ying
- Chinese: 典英
Transcriptions

Daht Ting
- Chinese: 逹庭
Transcriptions

Chan Heung (23 August 1806 – 20 August 1875) was the founder of the Choy Li Fut martial arts system.

== Biography ==
Chan was born on August 23, 1806 (corresponding to the 10th day of the 7th month of the lunar calendar), in King Mui (Jing Mei), a village in the San Woi (Xinhui District) district of Guangdong province in China. He is also known as Din Ying (Chinese: 典英) and Daht Ting (Chinese: 逹庭).

At age seven, Chan Heung's uncle Chan Yuen-Wu (Chinese: 陳遠護), a boxer from the Qingyun temple near Dinghu Mountain started teaching him Fut Gar, literally "Buddha Family," which specializes in palm techniques. Chan Yuen Woo had received his training from Du Zhang Monk. When Chan Heung was fifteen, Chan Yuen-Wu took him to Li Yau-San (Chinese: 李友山), Chan Yuen-Wu's senior classmate. Li Yau San had trained under Zhi Shan Monk (Chinese: 独杖禅师).

Chan Heung spent the next four years learning the Li Gar style under Li Yau-San's instruction. Impressed with Chan Heung's martial arts abilities Li Yau-San suggested he then train with a Shaolin monk called Choy Fook (Chinese: 蔡褔) to learn Choy Gar, a northern Shaolin style, as well as Chinese medicine and other Shaolin techniques. Choy Fook had learned his martial arts from Jue Yuan Monk (Chinese: 李友山), Yi Guan Monk (Chinese: 一贯禅师), Li Sou (Chinese: 李叟), Bai Yu Feng (Chinese: 白玉峰) and Cai Jiu Yi (Chinese: 蔡九仪). There is some speculation that Choy Fook also studied under Choy Gau Yee (Chinese: 蔡九儀), the founder of Choy Gar.

Choy Fook lived as a recluse on Lou Fu mountain and no longer wished to teach martial arts. Chan Heung set out to Lau Fu mountain to find him. Choy Fook, had been seriously burned and his head had healed with scars. This gave him the nickname "Monk with the Wounded Head" (Chinese: 爛頭和尙). Using that description, Chan Heung eventually located the monk and handed him a letter of recommendation from Li Yau-San. However, Chan Heung was disappointed when Choy Fook turned him down. After much begging Choy Fook agreed to take the young man as a student, but only to study Buddhism.

One morning, when Chan Heung was practicing his kung fu, Choy Fook pointed to a heavy rock and told him to kick it into the air. Chan Heung exerted all of his strength as his foot crashed against the rock, sending it twelve feet away. Instead of being complimented, Choy Fook placed his own foot under the heavy rock and effortlessly propelled it through the air. Chan Heung was awestruck by this demonstration. Again he begged Choy Fook to teach him his martial arts. This time the monk agreed, and for nine years Choy Fook taught Chan Heung both the way of Buddhism and the way of martial arts.

When he was twenty-eight, Chan Heung left Choy Fook and returned to King Mui village in 1834, where he revised and refined all that he had learned. In 1835 Choy Fook gave Chan Heung advice in the form of a special poem known as a double couplet.

龍虎風雲會, The dragon and tiger met as the wind and the cloud.
徒兒好自爲, My disciple, you must take good care of your future.
重光少林術, To revive the arts of Shaolin,
世代毋相遺. Don't let the future generations forget about this teaching.

In 1836, he formally established the Choy Li Fut system, named to honor the Buddhist monk Choy Fook who taught him Choy Gar, Li Yau-San who taught him Li Gar, and his uncle Chan Yuen-Woo who taught him Fut Gar, to honor the Buddha from which the art was named. Chan Heung died on 20 August 1875.

== Popular culture ==
In 1988, Hong Kong broadcaster TVB adapted a wuxia TV series of the life of Chan Heung, featuring Meng Fei. The title of the series is called "The Rise Of A Kung Fu Master" (Chinese: 南拳蔡李佛). Its first airing was on 18 January 1988 and currently features 20 episodes.
