= Hak Fu Mun =

Style of kung fu

Hak Fu Mun 黑虎門 Black Tiger Style
- Country of origin: China
- Creator: So Hak-fu 蘇黑虎

Hak Fu Mun 黑虎門 is a southern style of Chinese Kung Fu originating from the Shaolin Temple. The style's founder was So Hak-fu, who was one of the famed Ten Tigers of Canton 廣東十虎. The style was opened to the public by Wong Cheung 黃祥 who expanded the system.

Forms:

- 三星步 Saam Sing Bo
- 金剛拳 Gam Gong Keun
- 夜虎拳 Yeh Fu Keun
- Ng Ying Keun
- Sup Ying Keun
- etc
