= Choy Li Fut =

Chinese martial art

Choy Li Fut 蔡李佛
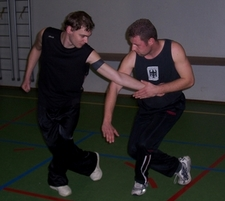
- Two people practicing the martial arts
- Also known as: Choy Lee Fut, Choi Lei Fut, Cai Li Fo, CLF
- Focus: Striking, joint lock, grappling, weapons training
- Country of origin: China
- Creator: Chan Heung
- Famous practitioners: Chan Heung, Chan Koon-pak, Chan Yu Chi, Chen Yong Fa, Wong Zen Yem, Philip Ng, Doc-Fai Wong
- Parenthood: Shaolinquan, Choy Gar, Li Gar, Fut Gar & Hung Gar
- Olympic sport: No

Choy Li Fut
- Chinese: 蔡李佛
Transcriptions
Standard Mandarin
- Hanyu Pinyin: Cài Lǐ Fó
- Bopomofo: ㄘㄞˋ ㄌㄧˇ ㄈㄛˊ
- Gwoyeu Romatzyh: Tsay Lii For
- Wade–Giles: Ts'ai^{4} Li^{3} Fo^{2}
Yue: Cantonese
- Yale Romanization: Kai Li Fwo
- Jyutping: Coi3 Lei5 Fat6

Choy Li Fut (Note: Choy Li Fut is the Cantonese rendering of the name. The name of the style is also spelled Choy Lay Fut and Choy Lee Fut or Chua Lee Hood (Hokkien) or Cai Li Fo (Mandarin) (Chinese: 蔡李佛; pinyin: Cài Lǐ Fó; Cantonese Yale: Choi3 Lei5 Fat6; aka Choy Lee Fut Kung Fu).) is a Chinese martial art and wushu style, founded in 1836 by Chan Heung. It was named to honor Chan Heung's uncle and the three masters of each family: Choy Gar, Li Gar and Fut Gar, plus his uncle Chan Yuen-wu, (Note: 陳遠護) who taught him Hung Kuen, and developed to honor the virtue teachings and philosophy of Buddha and the Shaolin roots of the system.

The system combines the martial arts techniques from various Northern and Southern Chinese kung-fu systems; the powerful arm and hand techniques from the Shaolin animal forms from the South, combined with the extended, circular movements, twisting body, and agile footwork that characterizes Northern China's martial arts. It is considered an external style, combining soft and hard techniques, as well as incorporating a wide range of weapons as part of its curriculum. It contains a wide variety of techniques, including long and short range punches, kicks, sweeps and take downs, pressure point attacks, joint locks, and grappling. According to Bruce Lee:

Choy Li Fut is the most effective system that I've seen for fighting more than one person. [It] is one of the most difficult styles to attack and defend against. Choy Li Fut is the only style [of kung fu] that traveled to Thailand to fight the Thai boxers and hadn't lost.

== Founding ==
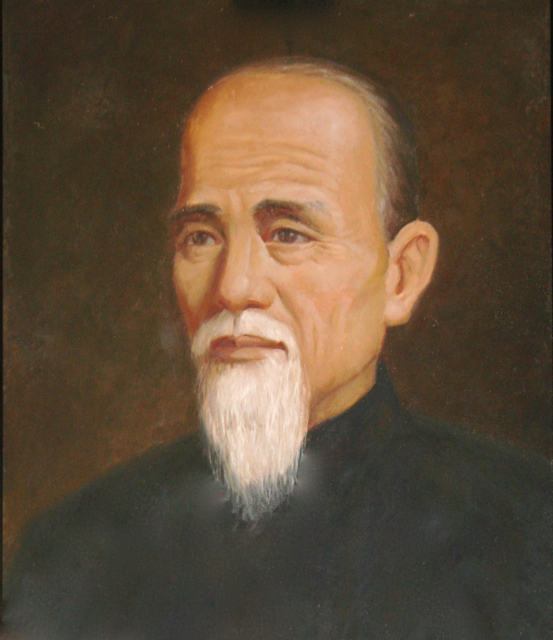
Oil painting of Chan Heung which hangs in the Chan family temple of King Mui Village in the Guangdong Province of China. This family temple is where Chan Heung founded his martial arts style and opened his first school to teach kung fu.

Chan (Note: Yue Chinese: 陳享, also known as Din Ying (典英), Daht Ting (逹庭)) was born on August 23, 1806, in King Mui, (Note: Yue Chinese: 京梅) a village in the San Woi district of Jiangmen, Guangdong province.

Chan's uncle Chan Yuen-wu, (Note: 陳遠護) a boxer from the Qingyun temple near Dinghu Mountain who had trained under Du Zhang Monk (獨杖禪師), who began teaching him the Fut Gar style of Chinese martial arts when he was seven. When Chan was fifteen, his uncle took him to Li Yau-san, (Note: Chinese: 李友山) Chan Yuen-wu's senior classmate. Li had trained under Zhi Shan Monk (至善禪師).

Under Li's instruction, Chan spent the next four years learning the Li Gar style. Impressed with Chan's martial arts abilities, Li suggested that he train with a Shaolin monk called Choy Fook to learn Choy Gar,

According to legend, the monk Jee Sin Sim See is said to have been one of the legendary Five Elders who survived the destruction of the Shaolin Temple sometime during the late Qing Dynasty.

At the time Chan sought Choy out, he had lived as a recluse on Mount Luofu and no longer wished to teach martial arts. Chan set out to the mountain to find him. When Choy was at the Shaolin temple, he had been seriously burned, and his head had healed with scars, which gave him the nickname "Monk with the Wounded Head" (爛頭和尙). Using that description, Chan eventually located the monk and handed him a letter of recommendation from Li. However, Chan was disappointed when Choy turned him down. After much begging, Choy agreed to take the young man as a student, but only to study Buddhism.

One morning, when Chan was practicing his martial arts, Choy pointed to a heavy rock and told him to kick it into the air. Chan exerted all of his strength as his foot crashed against the rock, sending it twelve feet (3.7 m) away. Instead of being complimented, he watched as Choy placed his own foot under the heavy rock and effortlessly propelled it through the air. Chan was awestruck by this demonstration. Again he begged Choy to teach him his martial arts. This time the monk agreed, and for nine years, Choy taught Chan both the way of Buddhism and the way of martial arts.

In 1836, Chan formally established the Choy Li Fut system, named to honor his 3 teachers: Choy Fook, Li Yau-san and his uncle Chan Yuen-woo, and developed to honor the Buddha and the Shaolin Kung Fu roots of the system.

== Characteristics ==
Chan revised and refined what that he had learned from his teachers and with his disciples, established standardized hand and leg techniques.

Choy Li Fut's hand techniques contain 10 elements: slapping or pressing palm deflection (擒), shooting arm bridge (拿), back fist (掛), sweeping (掃), yin/yang knuckle strike (插), upward power shot (拋), small upward power shot (撞), claw (爪), swinging power shot (鞭), chopping (劈), and yin/yang fist (擂陰). Its leg techniques contain 6 elements: bracing (撐), nailing (釘), kicking (撩踢), sweeping (掃), blocking (截), hooking (勾), and springing (彈). There are eight techniques of how the hand and leg techniques are applied: yin (陰), yang (陽), hard (剛), soft (柔), false (虛), real (實), stealing (偷), and sneaking (溜).

The stances of Choy Li Fut are similar in height to other martial arts styles, such as Hung Gar, but not as high as those of Wing Chun. This allows the practitioner to move quickly during combat without sacrificing stability and power generation. Unique to the Choy Li Fut style is "whipping", where the practitioner's upper torso twists to generate more power in executing hand and arm techniques. In other martial art styles, the upper body is less dynamic, placing more emphasis in stability and generation of static power. Other differences include how the practitioner's stance should be while facing their opponent. In the Hung Gar and Wing Chun styles, practitioners hold their torso perpendicular to an opponent, to allow the full use of both arms. In contrast, Choy Li Fut holds the torso at an angle to the opponent to reduce the target area exposed to him, and to allow the practitioner more reach. Front stances in Choy Li Fut have the front bent leg angled in to protect the groin, while other martial arts systems have the front bent leg facing forward.

During Qing era rebellions, Choy Li Fut practionners would identify themselves by shooting "yak" when striking with the palm, "wak" when thrusting with a tiger claw hand, "ha" when striking with the fist, "hok" when using a crane beak strike, and "dik" when kicking.

== Forms ==
The Choy Li Fut system has over 150 various single person, multiple person, weapon, and training apparatus forms, e.g. the Ching jong, the Sui Sau Jong, and the Ma Jong.

== Weapons ==
Nine-Dragon Trident is an exclusively Choy Li Fut weapon created by the Chan, which was designed to shred any part of the opponent with which it might come into contact. The many hooks and blades can seize an opponent's weapon and, with one twist, rip it from his hands. The Nine-Dragon Trident (九龍大叉) is known as the "King" of all weapons.

== Expansion of the system ==
Between 1847 and 1850, many Chinese leaders formed secret societies to overthrow the Qing. In 1850, under the leadership of Hong Xiuquan, the Taiping Rebellion broke out in Guangxi, and the movement would maintain control of large areas of southern China under the banner of the Taiping Heavenly Kingdom until its collapse in 1864.

Chan had 18 original Choy Li Fut disciples, known as the eighteen Luohan (十八羅漢), who were named to honor the Bodhidharma, traditionally considered to have taught the Shaolin monks the methods of the original Eighteen Lohan hands in 527 CE. They are considered by some to be the predecessor of Shaolin martial arts.

Hung Mun represented all revolutionary factions, including all Choy Li Fut representatives. Choy Li Fut schools chose to write the name of their schools in various ways to hide their affiliation with Hung Mun, which was outlawed, and to protect themselves from government persecution.

== Main branches ==
The Choy Li Fut martial arts system has spread throughout the globe.

Choy Li Fut schools can trace their lineage from the schools started by the original 18 disciples whom Chan sent out in 1848. Many schools can easily trace their origins from these four main branches: the King Mui / Chan Family Choy Li Fut branch, the Fut San / Hung Sing Choy Li Fut branch, the Jiangmen or Kong Chow Choy Li Fut branch, and the Buk Sing Choy Li Fut branch.

=== King Mui Choy Li Fut (Note: Chinese: 京梅陳家雄勝蔡李佛始祖拳舘 / 新會洪聖舘蔡李佛始祖拳館) branch ===
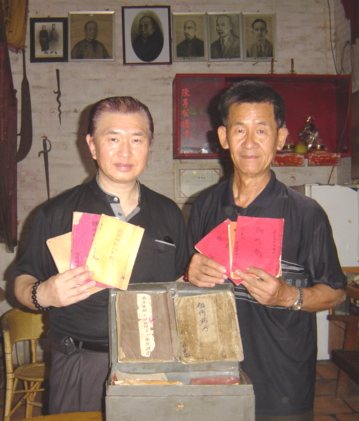
Chan Sun-chiu of the King Mui branch on the right with Doc-Fai Wong

The mainline transmission is referred to as King Mui (京梅), where he officially started teaching Choy Li Fut in 1836.

Notable Chan family student of Chan Yi-chi was Hu Yuen-chou, (Note: 胡雲綽) instructor of famous Choy Li Fut master Doc-Fai Wong, considered by many as a 5th generation successor and inheritor of the King Mui lineage. After Chan Yiu-chi 陳耀墀 his son Chan Sun-chiu became the inheritor and Keeper of the style. Following the passing on April 22, 2013, of Chan Sun-chiu (Keeper of King Mui Choy Li Fut)陈燊樵, all the descendants and known students become his current successors of the 5th generation of the King Mui lineage, they are; Chan Yong-fa and Niel Willcott. Chan Siu Fung, the founder's sixth-generation grandson, became a disciple of Grandmaster Doc-Fai Wong.

=== Hung Sing branch (Note: 佛山鴻勝蔡李佛拳館) ===
The Fut San Hung Sing branch of Choy Li Fut developed separately from the King Mui curriculum associated with Chan Heung. Its forms and curriculum therefore differ from those of the King Mui branch, and it traditionally contains fewer hand forms. The branch is particularly associated with an emphasis on practical fighting applications and continuous combinations of techniques. Lau Bun established the Wah-Keung Kung Fu Club in San Francisco. In 1935, the club became the first Hung Sing Choy Li Fut school established in the United States.

=== Buk Sing Choy Li Fut (Note: 北勝蔡李佛拳) ===
The Buk Sing branch of Choy Li Fut is traditionally traced to Jeong Yim's Fut San Hung Sing lineage through his student Lui Charn (雷粲) and Lui Charn's student Tam Sam (譚三). Tam Sam established a Choy Li Fut school in the Siu Buk (小北, "Little North") district of Guangzhou, where the school was known as Siu Buk Hung Sing Choy Li Fut. The name was subsequently shortened to Buk Sing Choy Li Fut, after the district in which the school was located. Tam Sam's approach placed particular emphasis on practical application and combat training, with less emphasis on the practice of forms than some other Choy Li Fut branches. His students subsequently developed and spread the Buk Sing branch in China and overseas. The branch also incorporated techniques from other martial arts through exchanges between Tam Sam's students and practitioners of other systems, including the Northern Shaolin practitioner Gu Ruzhang. The historical details surrounding Tam Sam's training and his separation from the Fut San Hung Sing school vary between Choy Li Fut lineages and sources. Consequently, accounts of his training, the circumstances of his departure from Lui Charn, and the subsequent development of the Buk Sing curriculum should be treated with caution.

== Death of the founder ==
When the Taiping government fell in 1864, Chan left China for a few years, some speculate South East Asian locations such as Malaysia or Singapore. At age fifty-nine, he became the martial arts teacher for the Chan Family Association overseas. In 1867, Chan returned home to King Mui, where he was able to see his own kung fu system gain tremendous popularity throughout Southern China. Chan died at the age of sixty-nine. He was buried in King Mui.

After Chan's death, his Choy Li Fut legacy passed on to his two sons, Chan On-pak (Note: 陳安伯) and Chan Koon-pak (Note: 陳官伯). Chan On-pak, the older brother, was known for his control of the spear as evidenced by his nickname "Five Blossoms with One Lance" (一槍五梅花).

In 1894, two of Chan On-pak's students, Cheng Si-leung (Note: 鄭士良) and Chan Siu-bak, helped the Tongmenghui, to overthrow Qing and found the Republic of China. The younger brother, Chan Koon-pak, left King Mui to become a merchant in Jiangmen, where his fame as a martial artist spread quickly. He soon had no time to spend as a merchant and devoted all of his efforts teaching Choy Li Fut. In later years, Chan Koon-pak established another large Choy Li Fut training center in Guangzhou.

== Bibliography ==
- Platt, Stephen R. (2012). Autumn in the Heavenly Kingdom: China, the West, and the Epic Story of the Taiping Civil War. New York: Alfred A. Knopf. ISBN 978-0-307-27173-0.
