= Fong Sai-yuk =

Chinese martial artist and folk hero

Fong Sai-yuk (方世玉)

In-universe information
- Gender: Male
- Occupation: Martial artist
- Affiliation: Southern Shaolin Monastery
- Fighting style: Shaolin Kung Fu
- Family: Fong Tak (father); Miu Tsui-fa (mother)
- Origin: Zhaoqing City, Guangdong Province, Qing dynasty
- Nationality: Chinese

Fong Sai-yuk
- Chinese: 方世玉
Transcriptions
Standard Mandarin
- Hanyu Pinyin: Fāng Shìyù
Yue: Cantonese
- Yale Romanization: Fong1 Sai3-yuk6

Fong Sai-yuk (or Fang Shiyu) was a Chinese martial artist and folk hero from Zhaoqing City, Guangdong Province of the Qing dynasty. Fong was also associated with Hung Hei-gun and the Five Elders of the Southern Shaolin Monastery. He was a disciple of Shaolin and his martial arts techniques were considered to have contributed to the development of Hung Ga Kuen.

He was first mentioned in wuxia stories dating from the Qing dynasty (1644–1912), such as Shaolin Xiao Yingxiong (少林小英雄; Young Hero of Shaolin), Wan Nian Qing (萬年青) and Qianlong You Jiangnan (乾隆游江南; The Qianlong Emperor Visits Jiangnan).

Although Fong Sai-yuk is a fictional character, the stories about him treat him as if he really existed. He has been the subject of various novels, movies and dramas.Stories about Fong have been adapted into films and television series since 1949. The most notable ones are the 1993 Hong Kong film Fong Sai-yuk and its sequel, which both starred Jet Li.

== Background ==
His father, Fong Tak (方德; Fang De), was a wealthy merchant, while his mother, Miu Tsui-fa (苗翠花; Miao Cuihua), was a martial arts expert and the daughter of Miu Hin, one of the Five Elders of Shaolin who escaped the Shaolin massacre. Sai-yuk trained in martial arts from his mother from an early age.

When he was still 10 years old, Sai-yuk was challenged by Lei Lao Ho to a duel and accidentally killed him in a battle. Following the fight, the local authorities were ordered to find Sai-yuk and beat him to death. To escape those who pursued him over the killing of the aforementioned master, Sai-yuk ran to Fujian Shaolin Temple to hide from pursuers. There, he was accepted by the temple occupants and trained with them in martial arts.

Due to this incident, Bak Mei and his disciples decided to seek revenge on Sai-yuk. Because of this, Sai-yuk left the Shaolin temple to train more in Shaolin Martial arts and traditional techniques.

== Portrayals in media ==
Films

- Fong Sai Yuk Sets Fire to Hung Wan Temple (1949), a Hong Kong film.
- The Adventures of Fong Sai Yuk (1950), a Hong Kong film.
- Fong Sai Yuk in Yun Yiang Cave (1950), a Hong Kong film.
- The Prodigal Boxer (1972), a Hong Kong film produced by the South Sea Film & Co., H.K. 香港南海影業公司, starring Meng Fei.
- Heroes Two (1974), a Hong Kong film produced by Chang's Film Co. 長弓電影公司 and distributed by the Shaw Brothers Studio 邵氏兄弟有限公司, starring Fu Sheng.
- Men from the Monastery (1974), a Hong Kong film produced by Chang's Film Co. 長弓電影公司 and distributed by the Shaw Brothers Studio 邵氏兄弟有限公司, starring Fu Sheng.
- Five Shaolin Masters (1974), a Hong Kong film produced by the Shaw Brothers Studio.
- Shaolin Temple (1976), a Hong Kong film produced by the Shaw Brothers Studio, starring Fu Sheng.
- Executioners from Shaolin (1977), a Hong Kong film produced by the Shaw Brothers Studio.
- The 36th Chamber of Shaolin (1978), a Hong Kong film produced by the Shaw Brothers Studio.
- Abbot of Shaolin (1979), a Hong Kong film produced by the Shaw Brothers Studio.
- Clan of the White Lotus (1980), a Hong Kong film produced by the Shaw Brothers Studio.
- Return to the 36th Chamber (1980), a Hong Kong film produced by the Shaw Brothers Studio.
- Disciples of the 36th Chamber (1985), a Hong Kong film produced by the Shaw Brothers Studio, starring Hsiao Ho.
- The Young Hero of Shaolin (1984–86), a two-part Chinese film directed by Wei Haifeng, starring Shi Baohua.
- Fong Sai-yuk (1993), a Hong Kong film directed by Corey Yuen, starring Jet Li. The film featured a cross-over between Fong Sai-yuk and the wuxia novel The Book and the Sword by Louis Cha.
- Fong Sai-yuk II (1993), a sequel to Fong Sai-yuk.
- Burning Paradise (1994), a Hong Kong film directed by Ringo Lam, starring Willie Chi.

Television series

- The Young Heroes of Shaolin (1981), a Hong Kong television series produced by TVB, starring Stephen Tung.
- The Kung Fu Master (1994), a Hong Kong television series produced by ATV and TVB, starring Nick Cheung.
- The Emperor and I (1994), a Hong Kong television series produced by TVB, starring Marco Ngai.
- Hero of the Times (1999–2000), a Singaporean-Taiwanese television series produced by TCS and CTV, starring Vincent Zhao.
- Young Hero Fong Sai Yuk (1999), a Hong Kong television series produced by ATV and TVB, starring Dicky Cheung.
- Southern Shaolin (南少林) (2002), a ..... television series produced by ..... starring Wu Jing.
- Gaishi Yingxiong Fang Shiyu (2011), a Chinese television series produced by Zhejiang Great Wall Entertainment, starring Yang Zi.

== See also ==
- Ng Mui
- Bak Mei
- Jee Sin Sim See
