= Miu Hin =

One of the Five Elders of Shaolin

Miu Hin (苗显) was one of the Five Elders of Shaolin who survived the destruction of one of the Shaolin Monasteries during the Qing dynasty.

== Background ==
Miu Hin is believed to be the father of Miu Tsui Fa and the grandfather of Fong Sai-Yuk, who would later become a renowned martial artist and a popular folk hero (although this may just be a myth due to the fact that it is unknown whether Fong Sai-Yuk was a real person or a work of fiction). According to folk tale, Miu Hin was a master of the Five Shape Boxing style and various Shaolin martial arts, and passed on his knowledge to his daughter who would later pass it on to her son. He is also believed to have helped create Wing Chun with the other Five Elders. Although Miu Hin was an actual figure along with the other Five Elders, most of the stories involving him are based on folk legend, and it's unknown whether or not they're true.

== Escaping the Destruction of Shaolin ==
Miu Hin was an elder of the Shaolin temple prior to its destruction. While he was an elder of the Shaolin monk, he was not ordained, and was "unshaved". After the Qing dynasty overthrew the Ming dynasty in 1644, a lot of political officers of the Ming government escaped imprisonment and found sanctuary behind temples and monasteries. This combined with the fact that the Shaolin temple also provided sanctuary to many rebels of the Qing empire led the Qing to attack and burn down the Shaolin Monastery in either 1647,1674, or 1732. According to legend, Miu Hin along with Jee Sin(至善禅师), Fung Dou Dak(冯道德), Bak Mei(白眉道人), and Ng Mui(五梅大师) escaped the destruction of the Shaolin Monastery, thus becoming the Five Elders of Shaolin. The elders traveled for over a year until they reached a temple in current day Sichuan Province.

== Duel with Bak Mei and Death ==
After reaching the temple at Sichuan Province, Bak Mei and the other four elders constantly had heated arguments regarding how involved they should get in politics and how many students they should have. Bak Mei favored more political involvement and taking in more students while the other four elders favored a more secluded life and taking in few, if any students. This disagreement allegedly led to a duel between Jee Sin and Bak Mei to settle the dispute, resulting in the death of Jee Sin by Bak Mei. Angered by Jee Sin's death, Miu Hin allegedly challenged Bak Mei to another duel in an effort to avenge Jee Sin. Although the fight was said to be close, Miu Hin was killed by Bak Mei during the duel. After Miu Hin's death, Fung Dou Dak would challenge Bak Mei to a final duel. After witnessing both of Bak Mei's duels and studying Bak Mei's techniques, Fong Dou Dak managed to defeat Bak Mei, who died of his injuries shortly afterwards.
