= Wing Chun (disambiguation) =

Wing Chun is a Chinese martial art.

Wing Chun may also refer to:

- Wing Chun (film), a 1994 Hong Kong martial arts film
- Wing Chun (TV series), two Hong Kong martial arts TV series: one in 1994, one from 2004 to 2007
- Kung Fu Wing Chun, a 2010 martial arts film starring Bai Jing
- Yim Wing-chun, legendary martial artist, founder of Wing Chun
