= Cheung Lai-chuen =

Chinese martial artist (1882–1964)

- Born: 1882; Huizhou, Guangdong, China
- Died: 1964 (aged 81–82); Shanghai, China
- Native name: 張禮泉
- Style: Bak Mei Pai (白眉派) (White Eyebrow Style)
- Teacher: Juk Faat-wun (竺法雲)

Cheung Lai‑chuen (Chinese: 張禮泉; pinyin: Zhāng Lǐquán; 1882 – 1964) was a Chinese martial artist widely regarded as the modern patriarch of Pak Mei Kung Fu, a southern Chinese martial arts system. He is credited with systematizing the style in the early twentieth century and establishing much of the curriculum used in Pak Mei schools today.

== Early Life and Training ==
Cheung was born in 1882 at the end of the Qing dynasty in Huizhou, Guangdong province, into a poor Hakka family. Early hardships, including the loss of his father, motivated him to learn martial arts from an early age. At around seven years old, he began his training under a local traditional physician and martial arts teacher named Lam Sek (林石), who taught him the Lau Man Gaau (流民教; “Vagabond” or “Wanderer’s”) style.

He later studied Li family kung fu (李家; “Li/Lee Family style”) under Lei Mung, gaining exposure to close-combat techniques, and trained in Southern Dragon Kung Fu from Lam Yun, father of the later famed master Lam Yiu‑gwai. These early studies in Hakka-rooted martial arts laid the foundation for his later development of the Bak Mei style.

== Introduction to Pak Mei ==
After moving to Guangzhou around 1908, Cheung reportedly encountered a Buddhist monk named Lin Sang, who defeated him in a martial challenge. According to Cheung's accounts, Lin Sang introduced him to his teacher Juk Faat‑wan (竺法雲), an elderly monk who transmitted him the core methods of what was then known as Ngo Mei Siu Lam (峨嵋少林; “Emei Shaolin”). Cheung trained under Juk Faat‑wan for approximatively three years until the revolution of 1911 which saw the monks disappear. However, the accuracy of this account is uncertain, and generally considered as a creation myth by scholarly sources.

Cheung retained elements from his earlier teachers, combining techniques from Lau Man Gaau, Lei Ga, and Southern Dragon Kung Fu, producing a distinct style that became the foundation of modern Pak Mei.

== Career and Influence ==
After completing his training, Cheung found employment with the local government’s salt tax enforcement department in Jiangmen. In this role, he confronted smugglers and other threats, using these real-world encounters to refine his martial techniques. His effectiveness helped him gain recognition, which later supported his career as a martial arts teacher.

Cheung also took part in public challenges and demonstrations, defeating other martial artists and establishing his reputation as an expert in armed and unarmed combat. By the 1920s and 1930s, Cheung’s Cheung opened multiple schools in Guangzhou, and attracted a diverse student base, including members of military and law‑enforcement groups. He aligned himself with the institutions of the Nationalist government, gaining political patronage but also deepening his fate to the fortunes of the Kuomintang. His connections helped him secure a position as a martial instructor at institutions such as the Whampoa Military Academy, where he developed bayonet and big sword techniques incorporated into official military curricula.

After the end of the civil war and the establishment of the People’s Republic of China in 1949, Cheung fled to Hong Kong with several of his sons, where he continued teaching Pak Mei. His sons and senior disciples played a major role in preserving and transmitting the art, particularly within Hong Kong and later overseas.

== Legacy ==
Cheung is widely recognized within the Pak Mei community as the chief figure responsible for defining the modern system. Schools that trace their lineage to him preserve a structured curriculum of forms and principles credited to his synthesis of multiple traditions with Pak Mei fundamentals
