= Lam Yiu-gwai =

Hong Kong martial artist

林耀桂 Lam Yiu-gwai
- Born: 1887; Huiyang County, Huizhou, China
- Died: 1966 (aged 78–79); British Hong Kong
- Style: Lung Ying 龍形派 (Southern Dragon)
- Teacher: Daai Yuk 大玉禪師

Lam Yiu-gwai 林耀桂 (1877–1966) was the master responsible for the dissemination of Dragon Kung Fu. Lam was born in 1877 in Huìyáng (惠陽) County in the prefecture of Huizhou in Guangdong Province, China.

From a young age Lam learned martial arts from his father Lam Qing-yun and grandfather Lam Hao-hing and Uncle Lam Hap. Like them, he would eventually undertake training from masters on Loh Fu Mountain in neighboring Bo Loh (博羅) County, where he was taught by Chan (Zen) master Tai Yuk of the Wa Sau Toi temple, who knew the Dragon style. He also learned the routines Saam Tung Goh Kiu (“Three Ways to Cross the Bridge”) from the Taoist Wong Lei-giu and Mui Fa Chat Lo (“Plum Flower Fist in Seven Sections”) from Ke Hing-ma.

Good friends since their youth in Huizhou, Lam Yiu-gwai and the Bak Mei master Jeung Lai-chuen張禮泉 later became cousins by marriage and opened several schools together. Both Lam and Jeung served as combat instructors at the Whampoa Military Academy under the leadership of General Chan Chai-tong陳濟棠.

Lam Yiu-gwai married and had several children. His wife taught Dragon Style Kung Fu to women in Hong Kong.

In the 1920s, he moved to Guangzhou, where he opened a number of Dragon style schools and met Mok Gar master Lin Yin-tang, who became a friend with whom he had much in common. Lin Yin-tang was from the prefecture of Dongguan, which bordered both Huìyáng and Bóluó counties. Like Yiu-gwai, Yin-tang studied at a temple on Loh Fu Mountain; in Yin-tang's case, the Temple of Emptiness (沖虛觀), where he studied meditation and traditional Chinese medicine.

After a stroke in the early 1950s, Lam Yiu-gwai moved to Hong Kong for medical treatment and to reunite with his family where, after another stroke in 1965, he died in 1966.

He passed on the art to his students, among others, Chiu Chung, Wu Hua-tai, Ma Chai, Chan Cheung (Robert Chan), Tsui Yiu-cheung, Yip Ho-sing, Tsang Gan, Ho Lai何禮, Cho Sam曹森, Lau Hong劉康, Mao Yim繆炎, Lee Fat李发 and Chan Dak, in addition to his sons Lam Chan-gwong (林燦光) and Lam Wun-gwong (林煥光). The Dragon Sign Athletic Association in Hong Kong celebrated its 50th anniversary in November 2019. In addition to Hong Kong and mainland China, Dragon Style Kung Fu is practiced in the United States, London, Canada, Ireland, and Australia.

Cho Sam's student, Yip Wing-hong, Lam Yiu-gwai's disciples, Mao Yim, Ho Lai and Lau Hong, would emigrate to New York City. They have taught numerous students in Manhattan Chinatown since 1974.

Chiu Chung‘s student Nicholas Costello established the Chiu Chung Lung Ying Academy in Slane, Co. Meath, Ireland and has been teaching there since 1998.
