= Wong Kiew-kit =

Malaysian martial artist (1944–2026)

- Born: 1944; Malaysia
- Died: 1 March 2026 (aged 81)
- Nationality: Malaysian
- Style: Southern Shaolin kung fu
- Teachers: Lai Chin-wah, Ho Fatt-nam, Choe Hoong-choy, Chee Kim-thong
- Rank: Grandmaster

Wong Kiew-kit (1944 – 1 March 2026) was a Malaysian martial artist who was the grandmaster in the tradition of the mythical Southern Shaolin Monastery in China, which should not be confused with the more commonly known Shaolin Monastery in Henan Province. He founded the Shaolin Wahnam Institute in 1982 in order to teach Shaolin arts to the public. Wong practiced and learned within a number of famous lineages which place him as a fourth generation successor of the Ven. Jiang Nan and a sixth generation successor of the Ven. Chee Seen both of the Southern Shaolin Temple.

== Life and career ==
Born in 1944, Wong Kiew-kit started his lifelong training of the Shaolin arts at the age of 10 when he began learning Shaolin Kungfu from Lai Chin-wah, who was also known as Uncle Righteousness. According to Wong's biography, he became Lai Chin-wah's best disciple. He has taught Shaolin Cosmos qigong, Shaolin kung fu, tai chi, Zen and also Lion Dance worldwide for more than 25 years. His school has qualified instructors in Canada, Ecuador, Puerto Rico, USA, Venezuela, Austria, Denmark, England, Finland, France, Germany, Ireland, Italy, Luxembourg, Malta, The Netherlands, Norway, Portugal, Russia, Scotland, Spain, Switzerland, Australia, Indonesia, Japan, Malaysia, Singapore, Taiwan, and the United Arab Emirates. He claimed to have over 2000 students throughout the world.

Wong received the Qigong Master of the Year award at the Second World Congress on Qigong held from 21 to 23 November 1997 in San Francisco, United States.

He wrote a number of books published in multiple languages on martial arts and philosophy. His works include Chi Kung For Health and Vitality, The Art of Shaolin Kung Fu, The Complete Book of Tai Chi Chuan, The Complete Book of Zen, Introduction to Shaolin Kung Fu, The Complete Book of Chinese Medicine, The Complete Book of Shaolin. Sukhavati: Western Paradise, and The Art of Chi Kung,

Wong died on 1 March 2026, at the age of 81.
