= List of Grace Under Fire characters =

Grace Under Fire is a television martial arts period drama produced by TVB. For the 2011 TVB shows, the review for the first 20 episodes by yinazee at JayneStars, considers it a underrated film series, and gives a rating four of five stars.

== Wong's family ==
Cast	Role	Description
David Chiang	Wong Fei-hung 黃飛鴻	Age 54; Po Chi Lam Master; Mok Kwai-lan's husband Wong Hon-pong and Wong Hon-yip's father Ho Tim-fuk's friend Tong Yuet-hang, Lui Kong's enemy Died from injuries sustained in a fight with Lui Kong (Deceased - Episode 24)
Liu Xuan	Mok Kwai-lan 莫桂蘭	Age 18; Wong Fei-hung's wife Wong Hon-pong and Wong Hon-yip's stepmother Mok Ping's niece Yau Sam-shui's adopted sister, later enemy Kwai Fa and Siu Hau's friend Lui Ching-lung's love interest
Power Chan	Wong Hon-pong 黃漢邦	Mentally disabled and had autism Wong Fei-hung's elder son Mok Kwai-lan's stepson Wong Hon-yip's elder brother Siu Hau's friend
Raymond Wong Ho-yin	Wong Hon-yip 黃漢業	A newspaper journalist Wong Fei-hung's younger son Mok Kwai-lan's stepson Wong Hon-pong's younger brother

== Lui's family ==
Cast	Role	Description
Dominic Lam (youth played by Ruco Chan)	Lui Kong 雷剛	Age 50; Lui Ka Kuen Master; Chan Kuen's husband Lui Ching-lung's father Wong Fei-hung's enemy Yau Sam-shui's master, later enemy Used by Tong Yuet-hang, but later become loyaled Killed Mok Ping under orders of Tong Yuet-Hang in Episode 23 (Villain but later repented)
Chen Shuang	Chan Kuen 陳娟	Lui Kong's wife Lui Ching-lung's mother Deceased
Bosco Wong	Lui Ching-lung 雷正龍	Age 21; A boxer Lui Kong and Chan Kuen's son Wong Fei-hung's apprentice Yau Sam-shui's friend, later enemy Kwai Fa's love interest Loved Mok Kwai-lan Became Kwai Fa's husband in Episode 32

== Tong's family ==
Cast	Role	Description
Elliot Ngok	Tong Yuet-hang 唐乙恆	Age 52 Canton West Co-Director General, promoted to Mayor of Canton in Episode 24; Kam Hei, Lee Piu-hung, Wong Yee-mui's husband Tong Yuet-fung's brother Ho Tim-fuk and Lee Fan's brother-in-law Tong Suet-kiu's father Yau Sam-shui's father-in-law and superior Tung Ming and Wong Fei-hung's enemy Used Lui Kong Instructed Lui Kong to kill Mok Ping in Episode 23; Colluded with Geng Yik-tin, Chan Kin and Kazuo Tokugawa (Main Villain)
Mandy Lam	Kam Hei 金喜	Tong Yuet-hang's second wife
Claire Yiu	Lee Piu-hung 李飄紅	Tong Yuet-hang's third wife Lee Fan's sister Yau Sam-shui's enemy Sold to a brothel in Zhanjiang by Tong Yuet-hang after being found for clandestine love affair in Episode 21 (Villain)
Catherine Chau	Wong Yee-mui 王綺梅	Tong Yuet-hang's fourth wife Tsui Hing-to's mistress
Matthew Ko	Lee Fan 李帆	Lee Piu-hung's brother Tong Yuet-hang's brother-in-law Tong Suet-kiu's uncle (Villain)
Ram Chiang	Ho Tim-fuk 何添福	Age 45; Fuk Yu Kui Restaurant owner Tong Yuet-fung's husband Tong Yuet-hang's brother-in-law Tong Suet-kiu's uncle Wong Fei-hung's friend
Lam Yi-kei	Tong Yuet-fung 唐乙鳳	Fuk Yu Kui Restaurant owner Tong Yuet-hang's sister Ho Tim-fuk's wife Tong Yuet-kiu's aunt
Leung Ka-ki	Tong Suet-kiu 唐雪喬	To Ming Church volunteer Tong Yuet-hang's daughter Lee Fan, Ho Tim-fuk and Tong Yuet-fung's niece Yau Sam-shui's wife

== Mok's family ==
Cast	Role	Description
Law Lok-lam	Mok Ping 莫平	Age 57; Mok Ka Kuen Master; Fuk Yu Kui Restaurant tea master Yau Sam-shui's adopted father Mok Kwai-lan's uncle Killed by Lui Kong under orders of Tong Yuet-Hang (Deceased - Episode 23)
Kenneth Ma	Yau Sam-shui 游三水	Age 24; Fuk Yu Kui Restaurant waiter Mok Ping's adopted son Mok Kwai-lan's adopted brother, later enemy Lui Ching-lung's friend, later enemy Tong Suet-kiu's husband, later broke up Lui Kong's apprentice, later enemy Tong Yuet-hang's son-in-law and secretary Lee Pui-hung and Tsui Hing-to's enemy Loved Kwai Fa, later enemy Colluded with Kazuo Tokugawa, later enemy (Main Villain in the later parts of the drama)
Liu Xuan	Mok Kwai-lan 莫桂蘭	Mok Ping's niece Yau Sam-shui's adopted sister, later enemy

== Po Chi Lam ==
Cast	Role	Description
David Chiang	Wong Fei-hung 黃飛鴻	Master; Mok Kwai-lan's husband Ling Wan-kai, Ma Yu-chan and Lui Ching-lung's master
Liu Xuan	Mok Kwai-lan 莫桂蘭	Wong Fei-hung's wife Became the Master in Episode 25
Au Sui-wai	Ling Wan-kai 凌雲楷	Wong Fei-hung's eldest apprentice
Evergreen Mak	Ma Yu-chan 馬如燦	Wong Fei-hung's second apprentice
Bosco Wong	Lui Ching-lung 雷正龍	Wong Fei-hung's apprentice
Oscar Leung	Siu Hau 小猴	General Assistant; Mok Kwai-lan and Wong Hon-pong's friend

== Fuk Yu Kui Restaurant ==
Cast	Role	Description
Ram Chiang	Ho Tim-fuk 何添福	Owner
Lam Yi Kei	Tong Yuet-fung 唐乙鳳	Owner
Leung Kin-ping	Ko Tai-fu 高大富	Shopkeeper
Law Lok-lam	Mok Ping 莫平	Tea master
Cheng Ka-sang	Chan Chiu 陳超	First Cook
Fala Chen	Kwai Fa 葵花	Age 20; Second Cook; Mok Kwai-lan's friend Yau Sum-shui and Kazuo Tokugawa's love interest, later enemy Lui Ching-lung's lover Kazuo Tokugawa's girlfriend, later broke up Became Lui Ching-lung's wife in Episode 32
Kenneth Ma	Yau Sam-shui 游三水	Waiter
Fred Cheng	Ma Sam 馬森	Waiter
Cheung Tat-lun	Tam Fat 譚發	Waiter
Chiu Lok-yin	Mung Ping 盲炳	Waiter
Bryant Mak	Lee Ming 李明	Waiter
Liu Xuan	Mok Kwai-lan 莫桂蘭	General assistant

== Other casts ==
Cast	Role	Description
Kenny Wong	Fok Koon-wai 霍冠威	Age 40; Fok Yuen Kap's successor A Mizongyi Master; Geng Yik-tin's bodyguard
Eddie Kwan	Tsui Hing-to 徐慶圖	Age 38; Tong Yuet-hang's secretary Wong Yee-mui's lover Yau Sam-shui's enemy Colluded with Chan Kin; Killed by Yau Sam-shui in Episode 27 (Main Villain)
Edwin Siu	Kazuo Tokugawa 德川一夫	A Japanese spy Kwai Fa's boyfriend, later broke up Loved Kwai Fa, later enemy Colluded with Tong Yuet-hang and Yau Sam-shui, later enemy (Main Villain)
Lo Chun-shun	Geng Yik-tin 耿易天	A Peking Senator; Fok Koon-wai's supervisor Colluded with Tong Yuet-hang (Villain)
Lee Ka-ding	Chan Kin 陳堅	A boxing gym and casino owner Colluded with Tong Yuet-hang and Tsui Hing-to (Villain)
Savio Tsang	Tung Ming 董銘	Canton East Co-Director General, promoted to Deputy Mayor of Canton in Episode 24; Ma Sun-wing's subordinate Tong Yuet-hang's enemy
Chiu Shek-man	Ma Sun-wing 馬新榮	Mayor of Canton; Tong Yuet-hang and Tung Ming's supervisor Killed by Tong Yuet-hang in Episode 22
Ko Chun-man	Lam Wah 林華	Peking Chief Executive; Yau Sam-shui's supervisor Ordered the arrest of Yau Sam-shui after knowing his crimes

== See also ==
- Grace Under Fire (2011 TV series)
