= Burning Paradise =

1994 Hong Kong film by Ringo Lam

- Film poster
- Directed by: Ringo Lam
- Screenplay by: Nam Yin; Wong Wan-choi
- Produced by: Tsui Hark
- Starring: Willie Chi; Carman Lee Yeuk-tung
- Cinematography: Gao Zi-yi
- Edited by: Tony Chow Kwok-chung
- Music by: Mak Chun Hung
- Production company: DLO Films Production Limited
- Release date: 26 March 1994 (Hong Kong)
- Running time: 104 minutes
- Country: Hong Kong
- Language: Cantonese
- Budget: HK$23 million
- Box office: HK$1,819,697

Burning Paradise (Foh Siu Hung Lin Ji 火燒紅蓮寺 (lit. 'The Burning of the Red Lotus Temple') is a 1994 Hong Kong wuxia film directed by Ringo Lam. The film is set in the Qing dynasty and stars Willie Chi Tian-sheng as Fong Sai Yuk and Yang Sheng as Hung Hei-kwun.

Burning Paradise was made during a period where there was new wave of popularity of sword-play themed martial arts films after the popularity of Tsui Hark's Once Upon a Time in China films in the early 1990s. The film was initially offered to Tsui Hark, who suggested it to the director Ringo Lam. It was Lam's only film in the style and was shot in Shanghai. The film performed poorly in the Hong Kong box office, earning just under two-million Hong Kong dollars against a 23 million dollar budget.

== Plot ==
During the Qing dynasty, young Shaolin disciple Fong Sai-yuk and his master, Chi Nun, are fleeing Manchu government agents hunting them. The two have become fugitives after the Yongzheng emperor gave orders to destroy the Shaolin Monastery for plotting to overthrow the government. While on the run, they meet a female prostitute named Tou Tou, who helps them hide. However, they are found by Manchu officer Crimson and his men. Crimson kills a wounded Chi Nun, and both Fong and Tou Tou are captured.

Fong and Tou Tou end up imprisoned at Red Lotus Temple, where other Shaolin practitioners are held captive. The prison's warden, Kung, is a hedonistic, power-hungry former general who forces the inmates to work as slave labor. He also booby traps the entire building to punish dissidents. To the Shaolin disciples' anger, Kung has enlisted one of their own, Hung Hei-gun, as the foreman. Hung and Fong fight until Fong is injured by a spear thrown by Kung. Left for dead in a pit full of corpses, Fong meets Shaolin master Chi Seen, who was also thrown down there.

Meanwhile, Tou Tou is taken as Kung's concubine. When offered a gift by Kung, she requests that Fong be released in exchange for her servitude. Kung initially agrees, but reneges after he becomes jealous of Tou Tou and Fong's relationship, throwing Fong back in jail. A love triangle is also revealed between head priestess Brooke and Hung, as well as between Hung and priestess Luk. Hung is caught by Brooke for looking at an explosives stash, but she lets him go. However, Luk betrays Hung, revealing him to be a double agent using his freedom as foreman to create a map of the temple for the inmates. His ruse uncovered, Hung helps Fong free the prisoners, who kill Luk in revenge.

The Shaolin disciples and Manchu soldiers clash, but the soldiers manage to partition and trap the disciples between gates. Fong and Hung escape the soldiers, and Hung reveals his plan to free the prisoners by blowing the traps up with explosives from a weapons storehouse. The two find Tou Tou held captive in Kung's bedroom, but Brooke encounters them and fights them both. She loses the fight when a broken bedframe falls on her leg and incapacitates her. A booby trap in the bed causes Fong and Tou Tou to fall into a pit, and the bedroom begins to fill with poisonous gas. Hung, grateful that Brooke spared him earlier, returns the favor and carries her out of the room before the poison can kill either of them.

Fong and Tou Tou follow the path to a catacomb of dead concubines. Meanwhile, Hung and a crippled Brooke make their way to where the explosives are stored, but a trap ends up killing Brooke. Crimson enters the catacombs and begins to fight Fong. At this point, Hung begins to detonate the explosives, causing the Manchu soldiers to panic and evacuate the temple. Fong and Crimson resume fighting in the main forge area, where Crimson is impaled by Fong's thrown sword and explodes. Hung, Chi Seen, and the remaining Shaolin members try to escape the temple, but are blocked off. Chi Seen asks the members to recite a sutra in front of a Buddha statue they find, but the Buddha is booby-trapped with firearms, shooting some of the disciples. A gloating, hidden Kung lures Fong and Hung to the battle arena with his voice. Meanwhile, the disciples' kowtowing opens a small hole above the Buddha, which they widen by lighting gunpowder near the statue. As the temple collapses, Kung reveals he is a powerful martial artist, using inked paper as powerful projectiles. Fong temporarily blinds Kung with his own ink, and the two successfully kill Kung by hanging him with chains. Everyone reunites and successfully escapes the temple, and Fong begins to escort Tou Tou back to her home on horseback.

== Cast ==
Cast adapted from the liner notes Eureka Entertainment's 2023 home video release.

- Willie Chi Tin-sang as Fong Sai-yuk
- Carman Lee Yeuk-tung as Dau Dau
- Wang Kam-kong as Elder Kung
- Yang Sheng as Hong Hei-kun
- Maggie Lam Cheun as Tsui Ho
- Ching Tung as Huet Dik Ji, Crimson Guillotine
- Li Ji as Master Chi Sin

== Production ==
Hong Kong director and producer Tsui Hark was initially offered to direct a remake of silent film serial The Burning of the Red Lotus Temple and passed on the option to make it.

Tsui Hark suggested to the producers to offer the project to director Ringo Lam. Lam had been interested in creating a wuxia film for years and accepted the offer. Derek Elley said that a swordplay film was "uncharacteristic" for Lam, and it became the director's only film set during the Qing dynasty. The wuxia film, is a form of martial arts film where the hero has an emphasis on chivalry and pursuit of righteousness. Author Stephen Teo said that there is no satisfactory English translation of the term, with it often being identified as "the swordplay film" in critical studies. The style had come to prominence again in Hong Kong cinema follows the release Tsui Hark's Once Upon a Time in China films in the early 1990s.

The film was shot in Shanghai and predominantly on soundstages which was unusual for Lam. It was shot near where Hark was filming his film Green Snake (1993).

== Release ==
Time Out London referred to the film as a "A box office disaster in Hong Kong" where it was only in theatres for eight days. After its release in Hong Kong on 27 March 1994, it grossed a total of HK$1,819,69 against a HK$23 million budget. The film was the 145th highest-grossing film in Hong Kong for 1994. Lam responded to the Hong Kong box office on the film, saying it cost more than 23 million Hong Kong dollars to make and was "a big loss for Golden Harvest."

Burning Paradise was released theatrically in the United States and Australia in 1994. It was released direct-to-video in the United Kingdom. It was later shown at international film festivals, being screened at the first Fantasia Film Festival in Montreal, Canada on July 13, 1996, and at the Melbourne International Film Festival in 2003 as part of their "Fu Fighters" line-up.

Burning Paradise was released on DVD on 29 June 2010 and on blu-ray by Vinegar Syndrome in 2023.

== Reception ==
Michelle Le Blanc and Colin Odell wrote in the book Heroic Bloodshed (2000) that Burning Paradise had high production values and incredible wirework and that it was "breathtaking but too much for some" due to its cynical tone and level of violence. They ultimately described it as an "acquired taste." Time Out London stated that "Some of the acrobatic fights do seem grimly anarchic, but the endless booby traps grow tiresome and the film's 'dark side' is undercut by feeble elements of humour and romance. As a genre piece: too little, too late." Film4 opined that "Lam gives the story a new twist by envisaging the temple as a kind of Quake-type fortress complete with bottomless pits, traps, poison gases and other nasties that await the two fighters who are assigned to free the monks. Some amazing cinematography and art direction lift this endeavour out of the ordinary." The Austin Chronicle praised the film, stating that it is "Lam's bizarre direction that makes this one of the better chopsocky efforts in recent memory. He manages to make the genre's clichés seem brand new again, creating a considerably darker and more sinister piece than your typical martial arts picture" and that "Although the finale is a slight letdown, for the most part, Burning Paradise is a terrific movie that tells an old story with a new attitude."

== See also ==
- Hong Kong films of 1994
- List of action films of the 1990s

== Notes ==
=== References ===
- "Night Owls". The Age. Melbourne, Australia. 3 June 1994 – via Newspapers.com.
- "Burning Paradise - Release". AllMovie. Rovi Corporation. Archived from the original on 29 January 2023.
- "Presidio Theatres". Austin American-Statesman. Austin, Texas. 13 August 1994 – via Newspapers.com.
- "Burning Paradise Review". Film 4. Archived from the original on 9 February 2005.
- "Burning Paradise". Burning Paradise. Eureka Entertainment (Media notes). 2023. EKV70493.
- "火燒紅蓮寺 Burning Paradise". Cantonese Cinema Digital Archive. City University of Hong Kong. Archived from the original on 4 February 2023.
- "12 Julliet - 11 Aout - Cinema Imperial 1430 Bleury". Fantasia: The Festival of Asian Fantasy and Action Cinema (in English and French). 1996. p. 40.
- Charles, John (2009) [1st pub. 2000]. The Hong Kong Filmography, 1977-1997. McFarland & Company. ISBN 978-0786443239.
- Crow, Jonathan. "Burning Paradise". Allmovie. Rovi Corporation. Archived from the original on 25 July 2012.
- Dannen, Fredric; Long, Barry (1997). Hong Kong Babylon: An Insider's Guide to the Hollywood of the East. New York: Hyperion. ISBN 0-7868-6267-X.
- Elley, Derek (16 September 1996). "Review: 'The Adventurers'". Variety. Archived from the original on 18 December 2024.
- Hawker, Philippa (25 July 2003). "New Martial in Town". The Age. Melbourne, Australia). p. 18 – via Gale.
- Hendrix, Grady (2022). Paradise on Fire (booklet). Vinegar Syndrome. VS-416.
- Morton, Lisa (2009). The Cinema of Tsui Hark. McFarland & Company. ISBN 978-0-7864-4460-1.
- O'Bryan, Joey (12 August 1994). "Burning Paradise". Austin Chronicle. Archived from the original on 19 August 2022.
- Odell, Colin; Le Blanc, Michelle (2000). "Ringo Lam: In Sheep's Clothing". In Fitzgerald, Martin (ed.). Heroic Bloodshed. United Kingdom: The Pocket Essentials. ISBN 1903047072.
- Oliver, James (2023). "Temple on Fire". Burning Paradise. Eureka Entertainment (Media notes). EKV70493.
- Pinkerton, Nick (March–April 2019). "Burnt Offerings". Film Comment. Vol. 55, no. 2. New York – via JSTOR.
- Rilfe, Katie (2 August 2018). "Japan's own Lady Bird and a Taut Korean Thriller Wrap Up Our Coverage of the Fantasia Film Festival". AV Club.
- Steintrager, James A. (2014). "The Thirdness of King Hu: Wuxia, Deleuze, and the Cinema of Paradox". Journal of Chinese Cinemas. 8 (2): 99–110. doi:10.1080/17508061.2014.915560.
- Teo, Stephen (2016). Chinese Martial Arts Cinema: The Wuxia Tradition (2 ed.). Edinburgh University Press. ISBN 978-1-4744-0386-3.
- TR. "Burning Paradise". Time Out London. Archived from the original on 4 March 2016.
- Yip, Man-Fung (2017). Martial Arts Cinema and Hong Kong Modernity. Hong Kong University Press. ISBN 978-988-8390-71-7.
