= Ng Mui =

Martial artist

- Born: 1703; China
- Died: Unknown
- Style: Wing Chun

Ng Mui (Chinese: t 伍枚, p Wú Méi; Cantonese: Ng^{5} Mui^{4}) is said to have been one of the legendary Five Elders—survivors of the destruction of the Shaolin Temple by the Qing Dynasty.

According to legend she is said to have been a master of various martial arts including the Shaolin martial arts, the Wudang martial arts, Ng Ying Kung Fu (Chinese: 五形功夫) and Yuejiaquan, the family style of Yue Fei. She is also credited as the founder of the martial arts Wǔ Méi Pài (Ng Mui style), Wing Chun, Dragon style, and Five-Pattern Hung Kuen.

She has been associated with various locations, including the Shaolin Temple in either Henan or Fujian, the Wudang Mountains in Hubei, Mount Emei in Sichuan, a supposed White Crane Temple, the Daliang Mountains on the border between Sichuan and Yunnan, and additional locations in Guangxi and Guangdong. According to one folk story, she was the daughter of a Ming general.

== Wing Chun ==
The subject of Wing Chun's origins has become a mix of fact and fiction due to the impacts of early secrecy and modern marketing. However, many Wing Chun lineages recognize Ng Mui as part of Wing Chun genealogy.

According to the Wing Chun master Ip Man, Ng Mui was residing and studying at the southern Shaolin Monastery; she managed to survive its destruction by Manchu forces due to her Sifu becoming a traitor after she defeated him during the reign of the Kangxi Emperor (1662–1722). She fled to the White Crane Temple. (which this account locates in the Daliang mountains between Yunnan and Sichuan) where she met a girl of fifteen named Yim Wing-chun whom a bandit was trying to force into marriage. Ng Mui taught Yim Wing-chun how to defend herself by distilling Shaolin martial art knowledge into a system that Yim Wing-chun could learn quickly, and use without developing great strength.

A variation to this legend is that after escaping the destruction of the Fujian Shaolin Monastery by Qing forces around 1730, the Abbess Ng Mui fled to the Daliang Mountains on the border between Yunnan and Sichuan. Ng Mui often bought tofu at a shop owned by Yim Yee (嚴二). Yim Yee had a daughter named Yim Wing-chun (嚴詠春), whom a local warlord was trying to force into marriage. Ng Mui taught Yim Wing-chun a version of her southern-Shaolin kung fu, which allowed her to drive off the warlord. After completing her training under Ng Mui around 1790, Yim Wing-chun married Leung Bok-chao (梁博儔) and taught the fighting techniques which Ng Mui had passed on to her. After Yim Wing-chun died around 1840, Leung Bok-chao passed the new style on to Leung Lan-kwai.

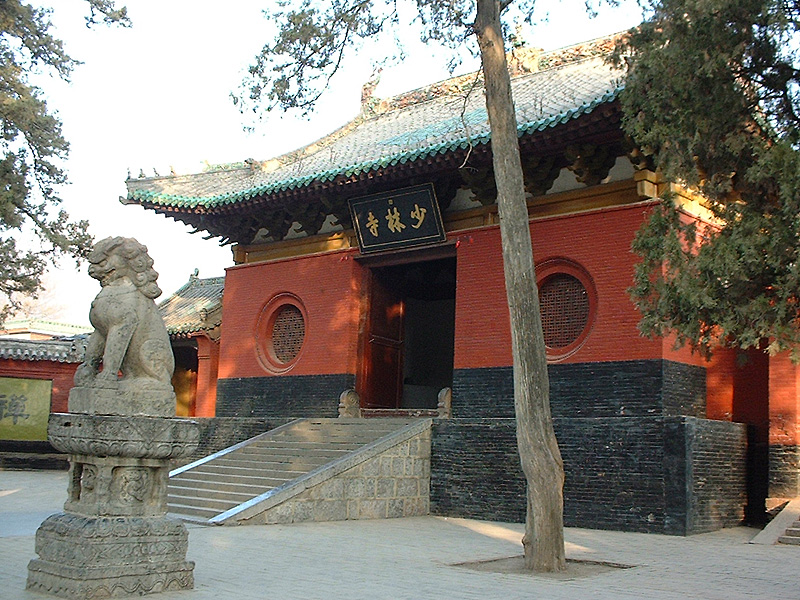
The calligraphic inscription that hangs over the main gate of the Shaolin Monastery was written in the Kangxi Emperor's own hand.

== Five-Pattern Hung Kuen ==
Legend has it that the Five-Pattern System was jointly created by the Buddhist nun Ng Mui, and Miu Hin, an unshaved disciple of the Siu Lam Monastery. Through careful observation, and imagination, these two kung fu experts imitated the movements of the creatures—how they jump, how they paw, and how they use their wings, beaks, jaws, or claws, how they coil up, how they rush forward and retreat, and finally they created this kung fu system consisting of movements modified from those of the named creatures, and adjusted the techniques to suit human limbs.

— Leung Ting, Five-Pattern Hung Kuen, Part I. (1980)

== Dragon ==
Modern Dragon style historians relate that Shaolin nun Ng Mui, who is said to have originated the Dragon style, was one of the last members of the temple before its first destruction, which they date to 1570 (Chow & Spangler, 1982). The Shaolin Gung Fu Institute of the Pacific Northwest agrees with the date of 1570 for a destruction of the temple and states explicitly that Dragon style was created at the Henan Shaolin Temple c. 1565.

== Wǔ Méi Pài ==
In the Wǔ Méi Pài tradition, Ng Mui—the daughter of a general in the Ming imperial court—fully developed her practical style in the Forbidden City. To develop balance and leg strength she trained on upturned logs, in a pattern she invented. She was travelling when her parents were killed in the Manchu capture of the Ming capital. She took refuge in the White Crane Temple (which this legend locates in Kwangsi Province), and became an anti-Qing rebel, teaching her style only within the Temple. The style uses instantaneous counters, and slower movements from Bodhidharma and Qigong.

== Tibetian White Crane ==
According to the genealogy of Tibetan White Crane, "Ng Mui" is the Chinese name of the Tibetan monk Jikboloktoto, who was the last generation of transmission before Sing Lung, who brought the art to Guangdong. This account is most different from the others, with a male Ng Mui, the absence of a Manchu menace to flee from and, given the dating of Sing Lung's relocation to Guangdong to 1865, a 19th-century setting.

== Popular culture references ==
In Michelle Yeoh's 1994 movie Wing Chun, the main character's teacher, played by Chang Pei Pei, was based on the legends of Ng Mui. In a 2010 film Kung Fu Wing Chun, also about the origins of Wing Chun, Ng Mui is played by Kara Wai.

== See also ==
- Jee Sin Sim See
- Bak Mei
- Fong Sai-Yuk

== Notes ==
	Chinese	Pinyin	Cantonese Yale
Yuejiaquan	岳家拳	Yùejiāquán
Wu Mei Pai	五枚派	Wǔ Méi Pài	Ng5 Mui4 Paai1	Ng Mui style
Daliang Mountains	大涼山	Dàliángshān
