= Mount Luofu =

Mountain in Guangdong, China

Coordinates: 23°18′N 114°00′E

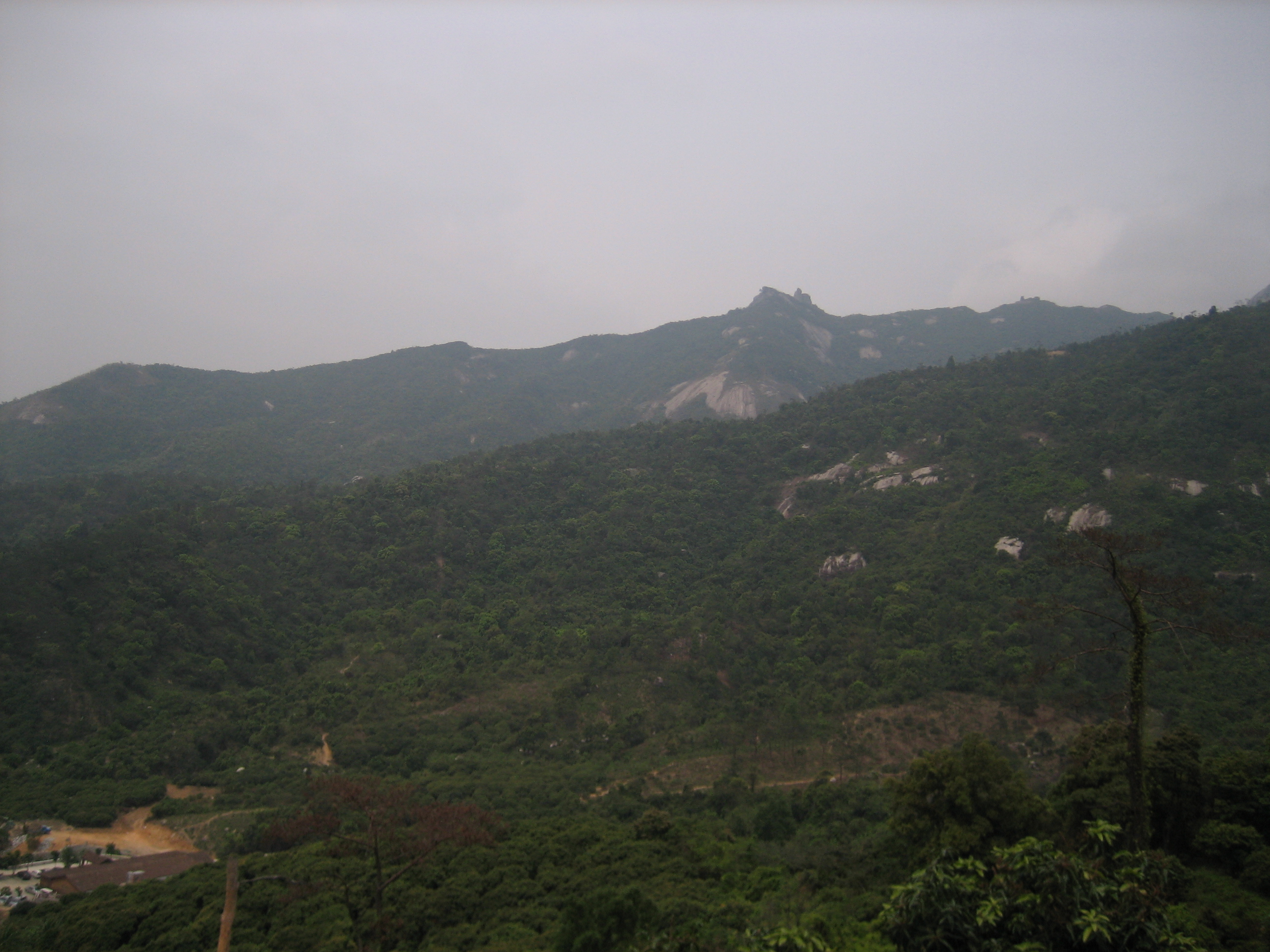
Mount Luofu in 2009

Mount Luofu (simplified Chinese: 罗浮山; traditional Chinese: 羅浮山; pinyin: Luófú Shān; Cantonese Yale: lo4 fau4 saan1) is a sacred Taoist mountain situated on the north bank of the Dongjiang in the northwest of Boluo County, Huizhou in Guangdong Province, China. It covers 250 kilometers. It is one of the ten greater dongtian of Taoism.

Among the many temples on Mt. Luofu is Wa Sau Toi, which is linked to both the Dragon and Bak Mei styles of Kung Fu.

Mok Gar masters studied meditation and traditional Chinese medicine at the Temple of Emptiness on Mt. Luofu.

Choy Fook, one of the teachers of Choy Lee Fut founder Chan Heung, is said to have been a monk on Mt. Luofu.

== History ==
In the Eastern Jin dynasty, the renowned Taoist practitioner Ge Hong once refined elixirs here. During Ge Hong's stay on Mt. Luofu, four huts were built, and subsequently enlarged into temples, namely the southern Temple of Great Emptiness (which was changed into the Temple of Emptiness afterwards), the western Temple of the Yellow Dragon, the eastern Temple of the Nine Heavens, and the northern Temple of Junkets.

In the Qing dynasty, a branch of the Dragon Gate Sect propagated its teachings at the Temple of Junkets. During the reign of the Guangxu Emperor, the abbot of the temple, Chen Jiaoyou, wrote "Evolution of the Taoism of Master Changchun's Lineage", an important work on the history of transmission and inheritance of the Dragon Gate Sect.

It was said that there were nine guan (Taoist temples), 18 si (Buddhist monasteries) and 22 an (nunneries) on Mt. Luofu, but after the Ming and Qing dynasties, many of them collapsed and only five guan and five si remain nowadays. The five remaining Taoist temples are the Temple of Emptiness, the Temple of Junkets, the Temple of the Nine Heavens, the Temple of the White Crane, and the Temple of the Yellow Dragon. The Temple of Emptiness is one of the national key temples acknowledged by the State Council.

There are many relics of Ge Hong on Mt. Luofu, such as the "Well of Longevity" from which he obtained water, the alchemical kitchen for refining elixirs, and the pond for washing elixirs. The Grotto of Vermillion Brightness on the mountain is said to be the place where Ge Hong cultivated Tao and attained immortality. It is situated in the forest in the deep valley below Mt. Luofu, where everything is in deep stillness, except for gurgling streams.

Besides, there is a "Boots-Losing House", which is said to be the place where Ge Hong and his teacher Bo Jing used to discuss scriptures. One day, after talking until daybreak, two swallows flew toward them. However, they turned out to be a pair of boots instead of swallows, after being entangled. There is a stone tablet above the house. It is about five-chi long, half-chi wide and one-chi high. It lies against a huge stone like a bed and is completely in the shade.

== See also ==
- Sacred Mountains of China
- Taoism
- Ge Hong
- Wa Sau Toi

== Notes ==
1. Temple of Emptiness (Chinese: 沖虛觀; pinyin: chōngxūguàn; Jyutping: cung1 heoi1 gun3)
2. Dragon Gate Sect (Chinese: 龍門派; pinyin: lóng mén pài; Jyutping: lung4 mun4 paai3)
