= The Kung Fu Master (TV series) =

1994 Hong Kong martial arts television series

- DVD cover
- Genre: Action; Martial arts Historical drama
- Written by: Yuen Kai-chi; Lau Siu-kwan
- Directed by: Benny Chan
- Starring: Donnie Yen; Nick Cheung
- Theme music composer: Chan Kwong-wing
- Opening theme: Ideal (理想) by Donnie Yen
- Country of origin: Hong Kong
- Original language: Cantonese
- No. of episodes: 30

Production
- Producer: Chan Yu-chiu
- Running time: 45 minutes
- Production companies: ATV; TVB

Original release
- Network: ATV Home; TVB Jade
- Release: 15 August – 23 September 1994

The Kung Fu Master
- Traditional Chinese: 洪熙官
- Simplified Chinese: 洪熙官
- Literal meaning: "Hung Hei-gun"
Transcriptions
Standard Mandarin
- Hanyu Pinyin: Hóng Xī Guān
Yue: Cantonese
- Jyutping: Hung4 Hei1 Gun1

The Kung Fu Master (洪熙官) is a 1994 Hong Kong martial arts television series directed by Benny Chan and starring Donnie Yen as the titular protagonist. Produced by ATV and TVB, the series aired on its channel ATV Home and TVB Jade from 16 August to 23 September 1994.

== Synopsis ==
The story is based on the historic martial artist and legend Hung Hei-gun (Donnie Yen) in the Qing dynasty. In the final stand Hung Hei-gun and Fong Sai-yuk (Nick Cheung) fight their way to defend the Shaolin Monastery against the invading army of the Qianlong Emperor who was trying to remove any opposition because he didn’t want to reveal that he wasn’t a true Manchu.

== Cast ==
Cast	Role	Description
Donnie Yen	Hung Hei-gun (洪熙官)	Founder of Hung Kar Kuen.
Nick Cheung	Fong Sai-yuk (方世玉)	Folk hero from the South.
Tang Ho-kwong (鄧浩光)	Kong Wai-lun (江錦綸)	
Lawrence Yan (甄志強)	Ko Chun-chung (高進忠)	
Erica Choi (蔡曉儀)	Yim Wing-chun (嚴詠春)	Founder of Wing Chun.
Wong Wan-choi (黃允財)	Qianlong Emperor	Born in 1711 and died in 1799.
Leung Kam-san (梁錦燊)	Yim Cham (嚴湛)	
Ben Ng (吳毅將)	Monk Sam Tak (三德)	Shaolin monk who lived in the early 18th century.
Hon Yee-sang (韓義生)	Monk San Kai (三戒)	
Wai Lit (煒烈)	Fung To-tak (馮道德)	
Lo Lieh	Ha Sat-to (哈薩多)	
Betty Chan (陳綺明)	Tung Man (佟敏)	
Mario Stones (陳綺明)	Tung-To (佟敏)	Known as Super Mario.
Leung Yat-ho (梁日豪)	Tung Chin-kan (童千斤)	
Anna Ng (吳浣儀)	Mother of Hung Hei-gun	
Pat Poon (潘志文)	Father of Hung Hei-gun (洪亭南)	
Berg Ng	Sek Tok (碩托)	
