= Daai Yuk =

Daai Yuk (Chinese: 大玉禪師; pinyin: Dà Yù Chán Shī; Cantonese Yale: Daai6 Yuk6 Sim3 Si1) was a Chan Buddhist master who is credited with teaching Southern Dragon Kung Fu, or Lung Ying 龍形拳, to Lam Yiu Gwai. He was a monk at Wa Sau Toi, one of the many temples on the sacred mountain Luofushan.
