= Grace Under Fire (Hong Kong TV series) =

2011 Hong Kong television series

- Official poster
- 女拳
- Genre: Period drama Martial arts
- Written by: Lau Chi-wah
- Starring: Liu Xuan; Bosco Wong; Kenneth Ma; David Chiang; Fala Chen; Elliot Ngok; Dominic Lam; Raymond Wong Ho-yin
- Opening theme: Do Cheung Bat Yap (刀槍不入) by Elisa Chan 陳潔靈
- Ending theme: Hui Jian (回見) by Liu Xuan
- Composer: Tang Chi-wai
- Country of origin: Hong Kong
- Original language: Cantonese
- No. of episodes: 32

Production
- Executive producer: Marco Lo
- Production location: Hong Kong
- Camera setup: Multi camera
- Running time: 45 minutes (per episode)
- Production company: TVB

Original release
- Network: TVB Jade
- Release: 7 March – 17 April 2011

Grace Under Fire
- Title screen shot
- Chinese: 女拳
- Literal meaning: "Female Fist"
Transcriptions
Standard Mandarin
- Hanyu Pinyin: Nǚ Quán
Yue: Cantonese
- Jyutping: Neoi5 Kyun4

Grace Under Fire is a 2011 Hong Kong martial arts television drama. It premiered on 7 March 2011 on Hong Kong's TVB Jade and TVB HD Jade channels, and ran for 32 episodes. Produced by Marco Law, Grace Under Fire is a Television Broadcasts Limited (TVB) production. It takes place in the early 1920s in Foshan and Guangzhou during the Republic of China era, and follows a fictional account of Mok Kwai-lan (portrayed by Liu Xuan), the last wife of Chinese martial arts folk hero of Cantonese ethnicity, Wong Fei-hung (portrayed by David Chiang).

== Plot overview ==
Mok Kwai-lan (Liu Xuan) is an ordinary girl working as a water labourer in one of Guangzhou's most famous restaurants. She lives in a simple and steady lifestyle with her uncle, Mok Ping (Law Lok-lam), and Ping's adopted son, Yau Sam-shui (Kenneth Ma). This simplicity is shaken when she meets the unsociable and eccentric young boxer Lui Ching-lung (Bosco Wong) in an underground martial arts arena, and the ambitious Kwai Fa (Fala Chen), an assistant chef who begins working in the same restaurant as her. Longing for Fa's affections, Sam-shui hopes to become a student of Wong Fei Hung (David Chiang), the greatest martial artist of Guangzhou, in order to impress her. Kwai-lan, originally uninterested in martial arts, becomes spellbound by the sport after watching an intense fight between Fei-hung and Fok Koon-wai (Kenny Wong), a Mizongyi practitioner.

Fei-hung is a man loved by the people, but his past had not been without causing offense. When Kwai-lan finds out that Ching-lung's father Lui Kong (Dominic Lam) is sick with leprosy, she asks for Fei-hung's help. However, Kong does not appreciate Fei-hung's hospitality and blames him for destroying his family. Twenty years ago, Kong was once Guangzhou's champion in the Lui Gar fighting style. Fei-hung, already famous for his martial arts in Foshan, challenged Kong to a duel. The two swore an oath: whoever lost the duel would have to leave Guangzhou. Fei-hung defeated Kong, but Kong's wife fell ill, postponing his leave. Fei-hung, drunk from a celebratory dinner, disgraced Kong in public and claimed him to be dishonourable for not keeping his promises. In a rage, Kong quickly leaves the city by night with his sick wife and their infant son Ching-lung. As a result, Kong's wife died and Kong contracted leprosy. Since then, Kong and Ching-lung had been struggling with discrimination and instability. Ching-lung, who had been kept in the dark about his family's history, is overwhelmed. When Lui-Kong, feeling guilty over his inability to provide for his son, decides to drown himself Ching-lung seeks revenge and attempts to kill Fei-hung in public. He is easily defeated, Fei-hung however apologises to Ching-lung for his mistakes and advises Ching-lung to pick up more martial arts before coming back for revenge.

Unknown to his son, Lui Kong is actually saved by Tong Yuet-hang (Elliot Ngok), Guangzhou's chief commissioner. Yuet-hang talks Kong in starting his life over, and suggests him to rebuild the Lui Gar martial arts school in order to compete with Fei-hung's Po Chi Lam. Yuet-hang actually has his own agenda, like Lui Kong he hated Fei-hung and wanted Lui Kong to publicly humiliate him. While Lui Kong recovers and prepares to re-establish his school, Ching-lung is touched by Fei-hung's generosity and decides to become his student. He develops a crush on Kwai-lan, and also wins the affections of Fa.

Fei-hung is touched by Sam-shui's enthusiasm and agrees to teach him and Kwai-lan, but Ping is strongly against it. He believes they would become aggressive and domineering if they learned kung fu. Kwai-lan disagrees and argues that kung fu is for self-protection. Her unyielding determination overwhelms Ping, and Kwai-lan learns from him that she is the only descendant of the Mok Gar family fighting style. As Kwai-lan's father died from a kung fu match, Ping does not want Kwai-lan to meet the same fate. Fei-hung sees a lot of potential in Kwai-lan and convinces Ping to teach her the styles of Mok Gar. Ping finally agrees, simultaneously allowing Sam-shui to become Fei-hung's student. Sam-shui, now proud and egotistical, begins abusing his newfound martial arts skill. This led to his involvement in a drunken brawl, and the death of Fei-hung's second son Wong Hon-yip (Raymond Wong Ho-yin). Initially charged with murder and to be executed, Fei-hung eventually realizes his son had been murdered by someone else and rescues him, but their friendship was forever ruined. Now hardened by life in prison, plagued by a prison record, jealous of Fa's love for Ching-lung and constantly looked down upon by the powerful, Sam-shui abandons martial arts and Fei-hung's ideals, instead striving to place himself in power first by becoming the increasingly powerful Lui Kong's head disciple.

Ching-lung and Fa had left Guangzhou in their efforts to find Lui Kong, and Fa was doing it only partially because she hoped to stay with Ching-lung and keep him away from Kwai-lan, who she knows Ching-lung had fallen for. When Kwai-lan unexpectedly visits them, she confesses to Fa she had actually fallen for someone, and Fa encourages her to go back to Guangzhou and admit her feelings while she and Ching-lung continued their search for his father. Kwai-lan does so, but not before telling Ching-lung that his father was actually still in Guangzhou. Both Kwai-lan and Ching-lung return to Guangzhou while a devastated Fa, rejected by Ching-lung, leaves by herself.

Amidst facing the threats and attacks against Po Chi Lam, Kwai-lan and Fei-hung grow closer. Kwai-lan not only helps Fei-hung in facing Kong's duel challenge, she also saves Po Chi Lam from collapsing. The two begin to fall in love, and Kwai-lan, being forty years younger than Fei-hung, marries him despite Ping's objections. Their happiness does not last long. Fei-hung, weak from an injury, is defeated from a duel against Kong and loses his title as Guangzhou's number one martial artist. Ching-lung, disgusted by his father's influence and still close to Fei-hung and Kwai-lan, chooses to stay in Po Chi Lam and allows Sam-shui to take his place in Lui Gar school. As he watches Yuet-hang and Kong's corrupted governance over Guangzhou, Fei-hung falls fatally ill. Before he dies, Fei-hung teaches all his knowledge of medicine and martial arts to Kwai-lan.

For more power, Sam-shui grows closer to Yuet-hang's office dealings and soon meet with one of Yuet-hang's strongest allies: the Japanese merchant Tokugawa Kazuo. When Kazuo visits Guangzhou, he brings with him Fa, the woman he had fallen in love with. The match seemed to meet all of Fa's hopes for a relationship, for Kazuo had wealth and prestige, and soon Fa becomes one of the most public and influential women in town. Partially seeing her as an example and because he knew Fa would not give him any favors, Sam-shui marries Yuet-hang's daughter Shuet-kiu (Kaki Leung) and also becomes a spy for Kazuo. Soon Sam-shui gains control of all of Yuet-hang's business and political jobs, later becoming the co-mayor of Guangzhou. The Japanese merchants and fighters gain control of Guangzhou's economy and martial arts schools, forcing Po Chi Lam out of business. With his power secured and his enemies weak, Sam-shui starts to threaten and control Yuet-hang's family from the shadows. Kazuo, who had been blackmailed by Yuet-hang, was more than happy to help him. He felt a personal grudge against the Chinese martial arts schools, for he and Fa had almost gotten married before Ching-lung confessed his feelings for her. Despite all that Kazuo could offer her, Fa chooses a simple life with Ching-lung, and Kazuo was feeling particularly vindictive over his loss. In an attempt to protect himself and his daughter, Yuet-hang tries to release information of Sam-shui's secret collaborations with the Japanese to the public, but is murdered by Sam-shui before he could do so.

Kwai-lan, hunted by the corrupt police and Lui Kong's men, forced to flee and hide in Foshan with Ching-lung, returns to Guangzhou and wins in a fight with the Japanese martial artists, reviving the pride of Chinese martial arts. Despite opposed by Lui Kong himself, she hoped they could truly reunite all the martial arts school now, but Lui Kong is soon murdered for his possession of Yuet-hang's evidence against Sam-shui. He dies tragically, but had successfully hidden the evidence. Kwai-lan knows if anyone found it Sam-shui's life was forfeit and tries to convince him back on the right path. The two of them have a private meeting, Sam-shui admits that for the sake of their sibling relationship he could let her escape, but only her and she must swear to never interfere in his affairs. She refuses him, and both bid the other goodbye knowing one of them would soon have to die. Sam-shui, now too invested in Japanese imperialist ambitions, starts a fire to burn Po Chi Lam down to the ground in order to destroy any evidence of his wrongdoings. Because of this, the evidence was discovered, and although Fa took a bullet wound the proof was given to the national government.

Forced to flee for his life, Sam-shui demands that Kazuo help him escape to Japan. Kazuo, angry that Sam-shui had caused the Japanese residents in Guangzhou so much trouble in his attempts to discredit political enemies, ends up shooting Sam-shui instead. However Sam-shui survives, and almost manages to escape Guangzhou when he boards a train with Shuet-kiu. Perhaps to use her once again or perhaps because he did retain some humility, Sam-shui apologizes to her for all the trouble he had caused and admits that had she not been Yuet-hang's daughter he would have been kinder to her. Shuet-kiu tearfully admits that she had been happiest with him, but now that he had caused the death of her father and unborn child she could no longer forgive him. She stabs him to death in the train, the bloody scene was the last thing Kwai-lan will see of her remaining family since Shuet-kiu had told her she didn't want any relation to Sam-shui's relatives.

Kwai-lan moves into Hong Kong, meets up again with Ching-lung and Fa, and opens a school of martial arts, unprecedented of the time she takes in students of all ages and background. By doing this, she hopes to spread martial arts out to the rest of the world, fulfilling Wong Fei-hung's hopes of the future.

== Cast ==
- Liu Xuan as Mok Kwai-lan (莫桂蘭), a realistic and simple-minded girl who is a descendant of the family who invented the Mok Gar style of Southern Chinese martial arts. She is a huge admirer of Wong Fei-hung, who is 40 years over her senior, and insists to marry Wong despite her family's objections. Grace Under Fire is Liu's first television drama since joining TVB in 2009. Liu, a retired Mainland Chinese Olympic gold-medal gymnast, explained that her gymnastic background has helped her to adapt to martial arts stunts easier. Instead, Liu said her hardest challenges were filming emotional scenes and reading and reciting Cantonese dialogue. According to Liu, producer Law required the cast and crew to only speak Cantonese to her on set. Liu's voice is dubbed by Kitty Wong.
- Kenneth Ma as Yau Sam-shui (游三水), Kwai-lan's older adopted brother who works as a waiter in a restaurant. Like Kwai-lan, he greatly admires Wong Fei-hung and hopes to one day become his disciple. Sam-shui, initially naive and kind, grows to become someone who is calculative and cruel after experiencing many pain and unfair setbacks. He vows to be "head and shoulders above others." Sam-shui's unrequited love for Kwai-lan's best friend, Fa, also contributes to Sam-shui's insanity as Fa is in love with Ching-lung instead of him. Sam-shui is Ma's first villainous role. Ma is impressed with Sam-shui's solid and dimensional characterisation, and praises the role to be a man "with flesh and blood."
- Bosco Wong as Lui Ching-lung (雷正龍), also known as Shandong's Iron Monkey (山東鐵馬騮), is a young autistic wanderer. Since his youth, Ching-lung and his father wander from county to county while practicing illegal martial arts. Both Ching-lung and his father are constantly being discriminated from peers, and for most of his earlier life, Ching-lung has had virtually no social life. He does not know how to communicate with others, nor could he fully express his own personality. Ching-lung begins opening up after meeting Kwai-lan, and even starts falling in love with her. Complementing Ching-lung's isolated personality, Wong does not speak much in the first 10 episodes. While Wong said it was comfortable to not have dialogue to remember, he was required to consistently receive martial arts training because most of his scenes in the first 10 episodes are fighting scenes.
- David Chiang as Wong Fei-hung (黃飛鴻), a martial arts practitioner who is known for glorifying the Hung Ga style. He is also a traditional Chinese medicine physician and operates a private practice medical clinic, Po Chi Lam, in Foshan. Chiang has expressed pressure in portraying Wong Fei-hung, a figure that was previously famously portrayed by Kwan Tak-hing in numerous films, and Jet Li in the Once Upon a Time in China blockbuster series. Producer Law insists Chiang to portray Wong Fei-hung in a relaxing manner, greatly differentiating past portrayals, in which most depict Wong Fei-hung as uptight and youthful. To prepare for the role, Chiang took martial arts training two months in advance of filming. Martial arts practitioner and actor Gordon Liu agreed to help Chiang throughout the filming process. Chiang also requested for the director to add in more scenes that have him fight as he believed Wong Fei-hung should still be very capable of fighting despite his older age.
  - Eric Li portrays the young Wong Fei-hung
- Fala Chen as Kwai Fa (葵花), Kwai-lan's best friend. Fa is opinionated, determined, and strong. She is even willing to marry a significantly older man in order to meet her needs and goals. However, after she meets Ching-lung, whom she later falls in love with, Fa's character becomes softer and more independent. Fa is also a key character in contributing to Sam-shui's developing madness as she does not return Sam-shui's love for her. Chen expressed that Fa's spunky personality is very similar to actress Tina Ti, intelligent and colourful.
- Elliot Ngok as Tong Yuet-hang (唐乙恆), the mayor of Guangzhou. Though he carries a careless appearance, Yuet-hang is constantly striving to rise even higher in the social ladder, scheming his way to the top. He has been enemies with Wong Fei-hung since they were both younger. Despite being raised in a much poorer and less-civilized family than Fei-hung, Yuet-hang secretly harbours ambitious intentions of becoming a successful figure in the city. After he becomes mayor, Yuet-hang continues to plot against Fei-hung by using Lui Kong, Ching-lung's father, increasing the misunderstandings between the two families. Producer Law wanted two different portrayals of Yuet-hang to show the character's dramatic change in personality. Ngok (older Yuet-hang) was to portray a much more calculative side of Yuet-hang, while Ben Wong (younger Yuet-hang) was to portray a much more innocent and calmer side.
  - Ben Wong portrays the young Tong Yuet-hang
- Dominic Lam as Lui Kong (雷剛), Ching-lung's father. A wanderer and a practitioner of illegal martial arts, Kong blames Wong Fei-hung for his family's misfortune.
  - Ruco Chan portrays the young Lui Kong
- Eddie Kwan as Tsui Hing-to (徐慶圖), Tong Yuet-hang's right-hand man.
- Kenny Wong as Fok Koon-wai (霍冠威), a Mizongyi practitioner and Fei-hung's good friend.
- Ram Chiang as Ho Tim-fuk (何添福), Yuet-hang's brother-in-law and owner of Yan Yu Restaurant.
- Law Lok-lam as Mok Ping (莫平), Kwai-lan's uncle and Sam-shui's foster father, who works at Yan Yu Restaurant as a tea master.
- Raymond Wong Ho-yin as Wong Hon-yip (黃漢業), Wong Fei-hung's second son. He is a young reporter that knows no harm to what he was doing. Against to his father's wrong acts during the past, he does not look up to his father. The knot was released after a trouble he got into during reporting, however it did not last long as he was killed in a drunk fight involving Sam-shui. Raymond Wong is slated to appear in only 6 episodes.

== Awards and nominations ==
=== 43rd Ming Pao Anniversary Awards 2011 ===
- Nominated: Outstanding Actor in Television (John Chiang)

=== 45th TVB Anniversary Awards 2011 ===
- Nominated: Best Drama
- Nominated: Best Supporting Actor (Elliot Ngok)
- Nominated: My Favourite Female Character (Liu Xuan)

== Viewership ratings ==
	Week	Episodes	Average Points	Peaking Points	References
1	March 7–11, 2011	1 — 5	26	28	
2	March 14–18, 2011	6 — 10	27	30	
3	March 21–25, 2011	11 — 15	29	—	
4	March 28–31, 2011	16 — 19	28	—	
5	April 4–8, 2011	20 — 24	28	—	
6	April 11–15, 2011	25 — 29	31	—	
6	April 17, 2011	30 — 32	32	34	

== Reviews ==
For the 2011 TVB shows, the review for the first 20 episodes by yinazee at JayneStars, considers it a underrated film series, and gives a rating four of five stars.
