= Dragon style =

Dragon style can refer to:

- A style of the martial arts called Southern Dragon Kung Fu
- A Norwegian architectural style called Dragestil
