= Fung Dou Dak =

馮道德
Fung Dou Dak
Pinyin:	Féng Dào Dé
Jyutping:	Fung4 Dou3 Dak1
Literally	"Fung, Dao Virtue"

Fung Dou Dak is said to have been one of the legendary Five Elders, survivors of the destruction of the Shaolin Temple by the Qing Dynasty (1644–1912). He reputedly had the body of steel and was renowned for his fighting skills, with one legend stating that he, along with Pak Mei, joined forces with the Qing army and destroyed the second southern Shaolin Temple with a huge army outnumbering the monks 10 to 1.

Besides his mythical deeds, he is identified as the founder of Bak Fu Pai (White Tiger Kung Fu).

== Fung Dou Dak and Bak Mei according to the lineage of Nam Anh ==
Ming China, which had been weakened by corruption and internal rebellion, was overtaken by the Manchu in 1644. Hong Mei ("Red Eyebrows"), abbot of the southern Shaolin Temple, died during this time and his position was passed onto Chi Thien Su, also known as Jee Sin. Another such master named Chu Long Tuyen did not accept this. He believed the Ming had become corrupt and would rather serve the Qing rulers. In 1647 the Manchu attacked the southern Shaolin Temple in Quanzhou, Fujian province. Only five masters managed to escape, and since then became known as the Five Elders.

Chi Thien Su, one of the Five Elders, founded another temple at Nine Lotus Mountain in Fujian where the survivors sought shelter. Chu Long Tuyen refused to provide his real name for fear of retribution against his family and students, in case they survived. The abbot then christened him Bak Mei—White Eyebrow. According to some stories, Bak Mei betrayed the Ming by taking information about their plot against the invaders to the Manchu Shunzhi Emperor, then returned with information about the Manchu attack plan to the Shaolin. After the temple was destroyed, Bak Mei and Fung Dou Dak left the temple on separate paths in order to study Taoism.

Bak Mei trained an anti-imperial attack force but, following capture of the force by the imperials, was forced to teach and lead 50,000 imperial troops in the second destruction of the Shaolin Temple to prevent those captured with him from being tortured and killed. There, Bak Mei slew the "invincible" Shaolin leader Chi Thien Su in single combat by breaking his neck. He claimed he did this to prevent the massacre of the monks in the temple by the troops who followed him.

While he is often portrayed as a traitor, Bak Mei's actions were undertaken (and by extension Fung Dou Dak's), including the destruction of the temple, with the intention of preventing harm to those who had chosen to follow him. It is possible that if Bak Mei and Fung Dou Dak had not aided the imperial forces, their followers would have been tortured to death.

== Fung Dou Dak according to other legends ==
Other sources (from Bak Fu Pai schools) assert that Fung Dou Dak did not, in fact, help Bak Mei destroy Shaolin. In their accounts, Fung was loyal to the Shaolin Temple; while it was burning, he saved the herbal medicine manuals and escaped through a secret tunnel.

He then adopted Taoism so as to avoid the Qing soldiers who were on the lookout for Buddhist monks. Fung made his way to a Taoist monastery on Emei Mountain, and there refined his martial skills, combining Shaolin skills with Taoist principles.

He was helped in his efforts by a physician and herbal expert named Doo Tin Yin (he helped him gain admission to the Taoist monastery and/or used his position as an imperial physician to protect Fung from his enemies).

== In popular culture ==
Ku Kuan Chung played Fung Dou Dak in the 1979 film Abbot of Shaolin.
