= Clan of the White Lotus =

1980 Hong Kong film by Lo Lieh

- Theatrical release poster
- Directed by: Lo Lieh
- Written by: Haung Tien
- Produced by: Run Run Shaw
- Starring: Liu Chia Hiu; Hui Ying Hung; Lo Lieh
- Cinematography: Chih Chun Ao
- Edited by: Hsing-lung Chiang; Yen Hae Li
- Music by: Eddie Wang
- Production company: Shaw Brothers
- Distributed by: Shaw Brothers
- Release date: 1980
- Running time: 95 min
- Country: Hong Kong
- Languages: Cantonese; Mandarin

Clan of the White Lotus (released in the United States as Fists of the White Lotus) is a 1980 Hong Kong kung fu film directed by Lo Lieh, with action choreography by Lau Kar Leung. The film is a follow-up to Executioners from Shaolin (1977) and Abbot of Shaolin (1979), and stars Liu Chia Hiu, Hui Ying Hung and Leih. It was released in Hong Kong and produced by Shaw Brothers.

== Synopsis ==
Following the death of his brother Pai Mei, Priest White Lotus seeks revenge with one idea in mind: to kill his brother's assassins. One night, he decides to pay them a surprise visit and murders one of the two. But the survivor of that night, will withdraw from the world and, with the help of the widow of the deceased, will perfect his technique to take his revenge...

== Cast ==
- Gordon Liu (credited as Liu Chiu Hiu) as Man Ting Hung
- Kara Hui (credited as Hui Ying Hung) as Mei-Hsiao
- Lo Lieh as Priest Bak Mei (White Lotus)
- Fai Wong Lam as Wu Nai Shing
- Johnny Wang as Ko Chun Chung
- Yeung Ching-Ching as Siu Ching
- King Chu Lee as Wu Ah Biu
- Hsiao Ho as Personal Swordsman of White Lotus
- Wilson Tong (credited as Tang Wei-shing) as Priest White Brow

== Reception ==
Andrew Saroch describes the film as "Another awesome Shaw Brothers film with an insane concept and some heavenly fight action choreographed by the one and only Liu Chia-Liang."

The authors of The Encyclopedia of Martial Arts Movies rate the film a maximum of four stars, praising the film's "partially evocative music" and "amazing martial arts".

== See also ==
- List of Hong Kong films of 1980
