= Bai Jing =

Chinese actress (1983–2012)

- 白静
- Born: 4 June 1983; Tieling, Liaoning, China
- Died: 28 February 2012 (aged 28); Chaoyang, Beijing, China
- Resting place: Babaoshan People's Cemetery
- Education: Central Academy of Drama
- Occupation: Actress
- Years active: 2007–2012
- Agent: China National Theatre of Children
- Spouse: Zhou Chenghai (m. 2010)
- Partner: Qiao Yu (2011–2012)

Chinese name
- Traditional Chinese: 白靜
- Simplified Chinese: 白静
Transcriptions
Standard Mandarin
- Hanyu Pinyin: Bái Jìng

Bai Jing (Chinese: 白静; pinyin: Bái Jìng) (4 June 1983 – 28 February 2012) was a Chinese actress. She was best known for her role in the 2010 film Kung Fu Wing Chun in which she played the Chinese folk heroine Yim Wing-chun.

== Background ==
Bai Jing graduated from Central Academy of Drama in 2002 and later joined China National Theatre of Children. She made her acting debut in the 2007 television series Xue Se Xiang Xi. She practiced Wing Chun from Ip Chun, in preparation for her role of Yim Wing-chun in the 2010 film Kung Fu Wing Chun.

== Personal life ==
Bai Jing and Zhou Chenghai (周成海), a billionaire businessman who made his fortune in investments, first met in 2004, back then Zhou was still married to another woman with whom he had a son. Zhou invested a large sum of money into Bai's acting career. In order to marry her, Zhou divorced his wife in 2006, despite his mother and friends' objections.

Zhou and Bai registered their marriage in March 2008, and they married in October 2010, despite Zhou's mother continuous objections. In 2011, Zhou, Bai and the fitness instructor Qiao Yu (乔宇) went to Hainan for a vacation.

=== Attempted divorce fraud ===
After their marriage, Bai Jing got into an extra-marital affair with Qiao Yu and both colluded to con her husband out of 9.6 million rmb and an Audi A8. They even took a video of Zhou's alleged unfaithfulness by hiring a prostitute to seduce him to set up a divorce fraud to get alimony from Zhou.

On 1 January 2012, Bai Jing met Zhou's mother at the hospital and told her about her intention to divorce her son. Zhou's mother, upon hearing this, suffered a heart attack and died. Her death drove Bai and Zhou further apart.

On 13 February 2012, Bai Jing submitted her divorce proceedings to the Beijing Chaoyang District People's Court, stating that Zhou had a mistress, was in possession of pornographic materials, and committed domestic violence, amongst many other offenses. She also stated that she was unaware that Zhou had a previous marriage and a son.

== Death ==
On 28 February 2012, Bai Jing met with Zhou in their apartment in Chaoyang regarding their divorce proceedings, however Zhou stabbed her three times and Bai Jing died on the spot. Zhou phoned his secretary, saying that "白静太狠了，没有退路了" ("Bai Jing is too vicious, no turning back [for him] now"). He took his own life shortly afterwards. Qiao Yu was eventually sent to prison for his collusion with Bai Jing for fraud.

== Filmography ==
Film
Year	English Title	Chinese Title	Role	Other notes
2008	Three Kingdoms: Resurrection of the Dragon	三国志之见龙卸甲	Lady Mi	
2009	Iron Men	铁人	Guo Xiaomi	
2009	A Tale of Two Donkeys	走着瞧	Cai Feng	
2010	Kung Fu Wing Chun	功夫·咏春	Yan Yongchun	
Television
Year	English title	Chinese name	Role	Other notes
2007	Xue Se Xiang Xi	血色湘西	Tian Suisui	
2009	Gun Gun Xue Mai	滚滚血脉	Teenager Xian Hong	
2011	Da Li Jia De Wang Shi	大丽家的往事	Chen Qiao	
2012	Zi Gu Ying Xiong Chu Shao Nian	自古英雄出少年	Xiu Yun	
