= Hong Xiguan =

Chinese martial artist

Hong Xiguan (洪熙官)
- Born: 1745; Hua County, Guangdong Province, Qing Empire
- Died: 1825 (aged 79–80) unknown
- Native name: 洪熙官
- Style: Hung Ga Kuen
- Teacher: Jee Sin Sim See

Other information
- Occupation: Martial artist
- Notable students: Luk Ah-choi; Lei Jou-fun

Chinese name
- Traditional Chinese: 洪熙官
- Simplified Chinese: 洪熙官
Transcriptions
Standard Mandarin
- Hanyu Pinyin: Hóng Xīguān
- Wade–Giles: Hung Hsi-kuan

Hong Xiguan (1745–1825) was a Chinese martial artist who lived in the Qing dynasty. He was also an influential figure in the Southern school of Chinese martial arts. His name is also alternatively romanised as Hung Hei-gun, Hung Hei-koon, Hung Hei-kwun, Hung Hsi-kuan, and similar renditions. He was believed to be the creator and founder of Hung Ga Kuen.

== Life ==
Hong was originally a tea merchant. He escaped to the Southern Shaolin Monastery in Fujian province after having an argument with Manchus elites. The abbot, Jee-sin, accepted him into the monastery and soon found out how talented and hardworking he was in Southern Shaolin martial arts. Jee-sin was impressed by these qualities and soon began to teach Hong the Bak Fu Pai (White Tiger Fist) that he specialised in. After six years, Hong became the best among the "lay" members of Southern Shaolin Monastery. These "lay" members refer to people who learnt Southern Shaolin martial arts but were not ordained as monks in the monastery. However, Qing government forces destroyed Southern Shaolin Monastery later because the monastery provided refuge for many rebels seeking to overthrow the Qing dynasty.

== Students ==
Hong had two notable students: Luk Ah-choi (陸阿采) and Lei Jou-fan (李祖寬). Luk learnt Southern Shaolin martial arts from both Hong and Hong's master, Reverend Jee-sin. He founded the Hung Ga style of martial arts, which he named after the Hung-mun, a Chinese fraternal organisation that was associated with the anti-Qing revolutionary movement. Lei founded the Hung Fut style of martial arts.

== Cultural references ==
Donnie Yen portrayed Hong in the 1994 Hong Kong television series The Kung Fu Master, which was produced by ATV and based on legends about Hong and Fong Sai-yuk. Jet Li also portrayed Hong in the 1994 Hong Kong film The New Legend of Shaolin, which was loosely based on Hong's life and incorporated elements from the Japanese manga Lone Wolf and Cub.

Chen Kuan-tai portrayed Hong in the 1977 Shaw Brothers film, Executioners from Shaolin, directed by Lau Kar-leung.

== See also ==
- Hung Ga
- Hung Fut
- Jee Sin Sim See
