= Mok Kwai-lan =

Chinese martial artist

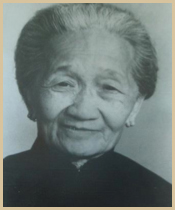
- Portrait of Mok Kwai-lan, in her later years
- Born: 15 October 1892; Nanhai, Guangdong, Qing Empire
- Died: 3 November 1982 (aged 90); British Hong Kong
- Native name: 莫桂蘭
- Style: Chinese martial arts Mok Ga; Hung Ga
- Teachers: Uncle Mok (Mok Ga); Wong Fei-hung (Hung Ga)

Other information
- Occupation: Martial artist
- Spouse: Wong Fei-hung (m. 1915; died 1925)
- Children: none
- Notable students: Li Chan-wo
- Notable club: Wong Fei-hung National Art Society
- Notable school: Wong Fei-hung Physical Fitness Institute

Chinese name
- Traditional Chinese: 莫桂蘭
- Simplified Chinese: 莫桂兰
Transcriptions
Standard Mandarin
- Hanyu Pinyin: Mò Guìlán
- Wade–Giles: Mo Kuei-lan
Yue: Cantonese
- Jyutping: Mok6 gwai3 laan4

Mok Kwai-lan (simplified Chinese: 莫桂兰; traditional Chinese: 莫桂蘭; Wade–Giles: Mo Kuei-lan; Jyutping: Mok6 gwai3 laan4; October 15, 1892 – November 3, 1982) was the fourth spouse of Lingnan martial arts grandmaster Wong Fei-hung.

== Early life ==
Mok was born on October 15, 1892, a native of Nanhai in Guangdong. When Mok was a child, she was adopted by her uncle and aunt who were childless. Later, Mok was secretly trained in Mok Ga by her uncle, despite being forbidden by her aunt. She also learned Dit Da from him. By 1906, her Dit Da training had completed and she had become an accomplished Mok Ga martial artist.

== Folklore basis ==
According to a common folklore regarding her encounter with the well-known Hung Ga practitioner and future spouse Wong Fei-Hung, in 1911, Wong Fei-Hung and his students were performing lion dance during the Dragon Boat Festival in Foshan, when one of his shoes accidentally slipped out and hit the face of the then 19-year old Mok who was observing the dance. Furious, Mok stepped onto the stage and struck Wong in the face, stating "It's your shoe this time, but what if the next time it's your weapon. You could have killed someone. A person of your skill should not ever have an accident like that." Wong apologized, "You are right. I should not have been so careless." Mok left and disappeared into the crowd.

A few days later, Mok's uncle found Wong to apologize for his niece's behavior, and the two became friends. Mok's uncle eventually gave her hand to Wong in marriage.

== Historical basis ==
In Mok Kwai-lan's interview with Andre Lam of Real Kung Fu (真功夫) made in 1976, she made no mentions of that fateful incident, and stated that Wong Fei-hung was a friend to her uncle and they would often had meals and chats at her uncle's house. One day during their conversations, Wong asked her uncle that he wanted to marry Mok, he accepted. Much to her aunt's dismay, who stated that Wong is too old for Mok, and by allowing the marriage to happen, Mok's uncle would wrong his brother (Mok's father).

Mok and Wong eventually married two years later in 1915 when she was 23 and he was 68. Since Wong's previous wives had died young, he considered himself to be a hex on his wives and had sworn never again to take a wife. Therefore, although she would be his only spouse from the time of their marriage to his death, her union with him was as that of a concubine and not a wife.

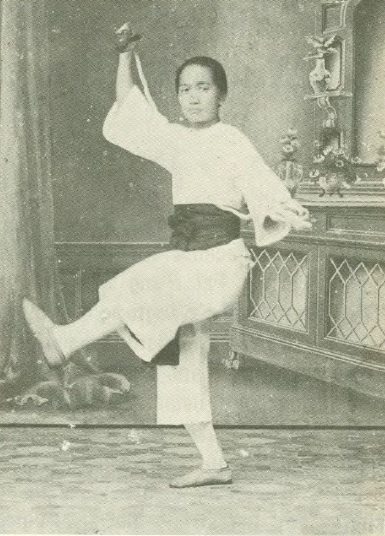
Mok Kwai-Ian in her early 20s

Wong also taught Mok Hung Ga, and she helped Wong to oversee the operations of his training ground, traditional medicine shop Po Chi Lam (寶芝林), and Dit Da clinic, where she performed all kinds of duties as a shopkeeper, a Dit Da healer, a physician, a cook, and a martial arts instructor, leading a busy life.

After the death of Wong in 1925, Mok was left destitute, fortunately Dang Sai-king (鄧世瓊), a better known female student of Wong, organized and paid for Wong's funeral arrangements. Dang and Lam Sai-wing (林世榮) later helped Mok and Wong's surviving sons to move to Hong Kong in 1936, where Mok opened a Dit Da Clinic (黃飛鴻授妻莫桂蘭精醫跌打) and reopened the traditional medicine shop Po Chi Lam there.

From 1944 to 1969, she served as an assistant instructor to Wong's student Dang Fong and taught Hung Gar to their students at the Wong Fei-hung National Art Society (黃飛鴻國術館) located on Gloucester Road in Hong Kong's Wan Chai area. She would teach at the Wong Fei-hung Physical Fitness Institute (黃飛鴻健身學院) until it closed in 1980.

== Later life and death ==
In 1970, she accepted an invitation from a local television studio to film her performing Hung Ga. In 1976, she accepted an interview from Andre Lam of the Real Kung Fu (真功夫) magazine in 1976 to reveal more about Wong Fei-hung's life and herself, and performed Mok Ga for the magazine's photos.

Mok was succeeded by her student Li Chan-wo (李燦窩) (born 1939), who established his own martial arts association Po Chi Lam Li Chan Wo Sports Association (寶芝林李燦窩體育學會) in 1980.

Mok died on November 3, 1982, having outlived her spouse by 57 years. Li Chan-wo and his students continues to pass on Wong Fei-hung's martial arts and medical practices to the future generations.

== Portrayal in modern media ==
- Wong Fei Hung – Master of Kung Fu played by Rain Li
- Grace Under Fire played by Liu Xuan
