= Wing Chun (film) =

1994 Hong Kong film by Yuen Woo-ping

- Film poster
- Directed by: Yuen Woo-ping
- Written by: Elsa Tang
- Produced by: Yuen Woo-ping; Anthony Wong
- Starring: Michelle Yeoh; Donnie Yen; Waise Lee; Cheng Pei-pei
- Cinematography: Pin Bing Lee
- Edited by: Ng Kam-Wah
- Music by: John Wong Sai-Cheong; Tang Siu-Lam
- Distributed by: Century Pacific
- Release date: 24 March 1994
- Running time: 93 minutes
- Country: Hong Kong
- Language: Cantonese
- Box office: HK$4.2 million

Wing Chun (Chinese: 詠春) is a 1994 Hong Kong martial arts film directed and produced by Yuen Woo-ping. The film stars Michelle Yeoh, Donnie Yen, Waise Lee and Cheng Pei-pei. The film was released theatrically in Hong Kong on 24 March 1994.

== Plot ==
Wing-chun is a young lady in charge of a family tofu shop in a mountain village with her father, sister and aunt. After local bullies tried to forcefully marry her during her youth, she trained to become a talented kung fu practitioner to fend off bad men lusting after her beauty, but her new prowess ends up scaring away any suitors, to the chagrin of her father. She is the only person out of all the villagers who will stand up to the local bandits, led by two nefarious bandit brothers nicknamed the "Flying Chimpanzee" and "Flying Monkey". One day, a young and beautiful widow named Charmy comes to town, catching the eyes of the predatory Flying Monkey. Wing-chun rescues the hapless widow and gives her a job in her family shop, earning the enmity of Flying Monkey.

Meanwhile, Wing-chun's childhood sweetheart Pok-to, who previously went away to learn kung fu in order to protect Wing-chun from local bullies, arrives in town returning fresh from years of training to claim her hand in marriage. He at first mistakes Charmy (who is enamored with the handsome stranger) for Wing-chun and is disappointed that his "fiancée" is now a flirtatious saleswoman, and mistakes the masculine-dressing Wing-chun as a rival suitor. Wing-chun remains silent about the misunderstanding due to concern that Pok-To will not accept her current unfeminine, warrior persona.

Wing-chun later injures the Flying Monkey in a night duel, hitting him with a fireball and rendering him permanently impotent. This arouses the curiosity of Flying Chimpanzee, who comes to avenge his brother. Impressed with Wing-Chun's fighting skills, he kidnaps Charmy and uses her to bait Wing-chun and Pok-to to the bandit's mountain fortress and surrounds them. He then challenges Wing-chun to a fight, on the conditions that she, Pok-to and Charmy will be allowed to leave safely if she can successfully pull out a spear impaled into a wall within three rounds of fighting, but if she fails she will have to become his woman. Wing-chun manages to win the challenge through tactics, but is unable to really defeat Flying Chimpanzee and gets injured by the latter's formidable "cotton belly" in the process. When Flying Chimpanzee demands a rematch in three days, she seeks help from her master Abbess Ng Mui, a Buddhist nun who created her style of kung fu, but her master only advises her to go and live a normal life.

Pok-to finds out about Wing-chun's tomboy disguise, and tells her that he doesn't mind that she is not a traditional woman. She agrees to marry him, and accidentally realizes (when Pok-to unintentionally punches the mosquito net to repel the pests) that her "inch strike" is the key to defeat Flying Chimpanzee's "cotton belly". Using this new-found knowledge, Wing-chun returns to fight Flying Chimpanzee again and soundly defeats the bandit boss in a final showdown, forcing him to submit to her superiority. With the bandit problem gone, Wing-chun marries Pok-to in a wedding celebrated by the whole village.

== Cast ==
- Michelle Yeoh as Yim Wing-chun (嚴詠春), the titular protagonist
- Donnie Yen (credited as Yen Chi-tan) as Leung Pok-to (梁博滔), Wing-chun's childhood friend and fiancée
- Kingdom Yuen (credited as Yuen King-tan) as Abacus Fong (芳姑), Wing-chun's sharp-tongued, money-loving paternal aunt
- Catherine Hung as Charmy (萬艷娘), an attractive widow and newcomer to the village
- Waise Lee (credited as Lee Chi-hung) as Wong Hok-zau (黃學州), a wealthy scholar who wants to court both Wing-chun and Charmy
- Norman Chui (credited as Chui Siu-keung) as Flying Chimpanzee (飛天猩猩), leader of the local bandits
- Cui Ya-hui (credited as Chui Ah-fai) as Flying Monkey (飛天猴子), deputy leader of the local bandits and a sexual predator
- Cheng Pei-pei as Abbess Ng Mui (五枚師太), Wing-chun's martial arts master

== Release ==
Guang Dong Tung Ah released Wing Chun on DVD in the United States on 5 February 2002.

On 20 September 2004, a DVD was released by Hong Kong Legends in the UK in Region 2.

One year later, The Epic Action Collection DVD was released on 26 December 2005, a 4-disc set including Iron Monkey (2-disc platinum edition) and Tai Chi Boxer. All three films were directed by Yuen Woo-ping. One month later, The Michelle Yeoh Collection DVD was released on 9 January 2006, a 3-disc set also including Magnificent Warriors and Police Assassins.

== Reception ==
Joey O'Bryan of the Austin Chronicle called it a "fun, period martial arts film, unique in its stylistic approach to both violence and sexual politics". J. Doyle Wallis of DVD Talk rated it 4/5 stars and wrote that what the film lacks in authenticity, it makes up for in "dazzling fight scenes". Beyond Hollywood called it "a silly comedy with kung fu" that "knows what it is". Chris Gould of DVDActive rated it 7/10 stars and wrote that the lack of actual Wing Chun fighting could [be] disappointing to some fans, but the action and comedy make up for it.

== See also ==
- Donnie Yen filmography
- Lists of Hong Kong films
- Michelle Yeoh filmography
- Wing Chun
