= Lo Lieh =

Hong Kong actor, martial artist, and filmmaker (1939-2002)

- Born: Wang Lap Tat; June 29, 1939; Pematangsiantar, Dutch East Indies (now North Sumatra, Indonesia)
- Died: November 2, 2002 (aged 63); Shenzhen, Guangdong, China
- Occupations: Actor; film director; screenwriter; producer; martial artist
- Years active: 1965–2001
- Spouse: 4
- Children: 2
- Relatives: Stanley Tong (brother-in-law)

Chinese name
- Traditional Chinese: 羅烈
- Simplified Chinese: 罗烈
Transcriptions
Standard Mandarin
- Hanyu Pinyin: Luó Liè
Yue: Cantonese
- Jyutping: Lo^{4} Lit^{6}

Wang Lap Tat
- Traditional Chinese: 王立達
- Simplified Chinese: 王立达
Transcriptions
Standard Mandarin
- Hanyu Pinyin: Wáng Lìdá
Yue: Cantonese
- Jyutping: wong4 laap6 daat6

Wang Lap Tat (Chinese: 王立達; June 29, 1939 – November 2, 2002), known by his stage name Lo Lieh (Chinese: 羅烈), was an Indonesian-born Hong Kong actor, martial artist, and filmmaker. He was a star of Shaw Brothers’ martial arts films during the 1970s.

His best known roles including Chao Chi-hao in the King Boxer (1972), Pai Mei in Executioners from Shaolin (1977) and Clan of the White Lotus (1980), and General Tien Ta in The 36th Chamber of Shaolin (1978).

== Early life ==
Lo was born Wang Lap Tat (Chinese: 王立達) to Cantonese parents from Guangdong, China, in Pematangsiantar (then in the Dutch East Indies) on June 29, 1939. He spent his early life in Indonesia and then his parents sent him back to China and attended acting school in Hong Kong.

He began his martial arts training in 1962 and joined the Shaw Brothers Studio in the same year and went on to become one of the most famous actors in Hong Kong martial arts and kung fu films in the late 1960s and 1970s. He adopted the stage name Lo Lieh (Chinese: 羅烈).

== Acting career ==
In 1970, Lo played Kao Hsia in the film Brothers Five, alongside Cheng Pei-pei, and co-starred with Jimmy Wang Yu in The Chinese Boxer. Lo starred in the 1972 cult classic King Boxer a.k.a. Five Fingers of Death . Lo played Ho Chiang in the 1974 film The Stranger and the Gunfighter, alongside Lee Van Cleef. In 1977, Lo portrayed Pai Mei in the Executioners from Shaolin and Miyamoto in Fist of Fury II, along with 何宗道(ホー・チョンドー). Lo played General Tien Ta in the 1978 film The 36th Chamber of Shaolin, alongside Gordon Liu and Lee Hoi San.

In the 1980s, Lo directed and starred in the 1980 film Clan of the White Lotus, along with Gordon Liu. Lo played Triad Gangster Boss in the 1988 film Dragons Forever, alongside Jackie Chan, Sammo Hung and Yuen Biao. Lo played Fei in the 1989 film Miracles along with Jackie Chan, Richard Ng and Billy Chow.

In the 1990s, Lo played Choi Kun-lun in the 1991 film Sex and Zen alongside Lawrence Ng, Amy Yip and Kent Cheng. Lo played The General in the 1992 film Police Story 3: Super Cop alongside Jackie Chan and Michelle Yeoh. During the latter part of the decade, he moved to Guangdong in Mainland China to open a performing arts school.

In the 2000s, Lo played Wei Tung's Uncle in the 2001 film The Vampire Combat, with Collin Chou and Valerie Chow. His last film was 2001's Glass Tears, before retiring from acting at the age of 62.

== Personal life ==
Lo married Grace Tang Chia-li on April 15, 1976. Lo and his wife later divorced. He was the brother-in-law of Stanley Tong, who is brother of wife Grace.

=== Death ===
Lo died of a heart attack in Shenzhen on November 2, 2002.
