= Yim Wing-chun =

Legendary founder of Wing Chun martial arts

- Born: 1735; China
- Died: 1795 (aged 59-60); China
- Style: Wing Chun
- Teacher: Ng Mui
- Years active: fl. c. 1750-1795

Other information
- Spouse: Leung Bok-chau

Yim Wing-chun (simplified Chinese: 严咏春; traditional Chinese: 嚴詠春; Cantonese Yale: Yim^{4} Wing^{6}-cheun^{1}; pinyin: Yán Yǒngchūn) is a Chinese legendary character, often cited in Wing Chun legends as the first master of the martial art bearing her name. Wing-chun, though a person's name in Chinese language, translates literally to "spring chant", or may be substituted with the character for "eternal spring".

== Background ==
Different accounts of Yim's legend exist, but the central sequence of events remains largely the same, beginning with the origin of her teacher. During the Qing dynasty, a Shaolin Buddhist nun and abbess, Ng Mui (五枚師太), reportedly fled the destruction of the Shaolin temple at the hands of the government; the temple was believed to be harbouring revolutionaries. According to one legend, after being inspired by witnessing a crane and a snake fighting, Ng Mui incorporated their movements into her style of Chinese kung fu to form a new, yet-unnamed martial art system.

Ng Mui later took on a disciple, Yim Wing-chun, and passed the art on to her. Yim Wing-chun was well known for her beauty and sold tofu for a living. A local bully tried to force her to marry him, but she used the art to defeat him. Some accounts claim that Ng Mui taught Yim the art specifically for the purpose of defending herself against the man's unwanted advances.

Yim later married Leung Bok-chau, a salt merchant, who named the art "Wing Chun Kuen" (Wing Chun Fist) after her. James Yimm Lee (1972) attributes significant development of the art to Yim Wing-chun, crediting her with the invention of the Chi Sao (sticking hands) exercise. From there, the art passed through several men's hands before coming to Ip Man.

== Lineage ==
Lineage in Wing Chun
Sifu	Ng Mui; creator of Wing Chun
Yim Wing-chun (嚴詠春)
Only student	Leung Bok-chau (梁博儔); her husband

== In popular culture ==
Stranger from Shaolin (1977) uses the character of Yim Wing-chun in an action film genre starring Cecilia Wong Hang-Sau.

The movie Wing Chun (1994) loosely portrays Yim Wing-chun's life within the action film genre, with Michelle Yeoh portraying the central character and Donnie Yen (now famous for playing Ip Man in four films) playing Leung Pok-to, Yim Wing-chun's childhood friend and fiancé.

Erica Choi portrays Yim Wing-chun in the 1994 Hong Kong martial arts television series The Kung Fu Master.

In the 2010 film Kung Fu Wing Chun, Yim Wing-chun was portrayed by Bai Jing and Leung Bok-chau was portrayed by Yu Shaoqun.

Meng and Rudnicki (2006) have written a critical analysis of the legend surrounding Yim Wing-chun.
