= Southern Shaolin Monastery =

Building in Putian, China

The Southern Shaolin Monastery or Nan-Shaolin (南少林) is a Buddhist monastery whose existence and location are both disputed although associated ruins have been identified. By tradition, it is considered a source of Nanquan.

== History ==
The following account is based on legend or folklore, with little, if any, documentary evidence to support it.

During the Tang dynasty in the reign of Emperor Taizong of Tang, warrior monks from Henan Shaolin were deployed from the Shaolin temple to combat piracy. With the pirates suppressed, the monks remained in support of the local garrison and established the Southern Shaolin Monastery. During the Tang dynasty, Shaolin warriors were used in support of the regular army, and at its peak, there were nine subsidiary Shaolin monasteries. With the demise of the Shaolin warrior units, the subsidiary Shaolin monasteries disappeared, so that by the end of the Qing dynasty only the temple at Henan remained.

The Southern Shaolin Temple gained a reputation for being a revolutionary center and the abbot refused to become a part of the emperor's army or take orders from him. In an effort to crush the growing rebellion, the Qing army attacked and burned the Southern Shaolin Monastery during middle of the 19th century. Only the most skilled Shaolin monks escaped the attack.

== Modern perspectives ==
Professor Barend J. ter Haar has suggested "that stories on the burning of a real or mythological Shaolin monastery were circulating in southern China towards the end of the eighteenth century, which were then taken up in different ways by martial arts specialists and by the Triads."

The book Martial Arts of the World: Regions and individual arts gives these stories of a Southern temple as an example of the unverifiable claims often made for the establishment of Chinese martial art styles. It says "One example involves a Shaolin monastery in Fujian Province. During the nineteenth century, Heaven and Earth Society documents referred to a southern Shaolin monastery in Fujian Province from whence so-called southern Shaolin martial arts styles such as Hong Quan reportedly originated. Although this assertion has been repeated many times, and claimants from three locations (Quanzhou, Putian, and Fuqing) have each made a case for their location, none of the claimants has been able to provide much evidence to support their claims."

In some accounts of the burning of the Shaolin Temple, it was the Southern temple that was burnt and destroyed by the Qing authorities, not the Northern temple. In these accounts with the Southern temple destroyed there remained just the Five Elders to continue the traditions of the Southern temple, and as the elders fled and dispersed throughout Southern China they established the lineages that gave rise to the Hung, Lau, Choi, Lee, Mok and Wing Chun styles and those styles that derive from them such as Cai Li Fo. It is said that after the government destroyed the first temple Chee Seen, one of the Five Elders went on to build a second southern Shaolin Temple at Jiulian Shan (Nine Lotus Mountain) which was also later destroyed by the Qing government with the help of Pak Mei and Fung Dou Dak, two of Five Elders who defected from the Shaolin.

== Controversy ==
The Southern Shaolin Monastery is considered by some to be a construct of fiction and folklore. Shi Yongxin, the former abbot of the Shaolin Monastery has said "In all the records of the Shaolin Monastery, I have never seen the words 'Southern Shaolin'." In response, the abbot of the Shaolin Monastery at Quanzhou said "Shaolin is definitely present in Fujian, it is not up to anyone to say it does or does not, its history can be found, its history can be proven, in this kind of argument these are of no consequence."

== See also ==
- Shaolin Sect
