= Five Elders =

Legendary Chinese martial artists

- Chinese: 少林五祖
Transcriptions
Standard Mandarin
- Hanyu Pinyin: Shàolín wǔ zǔ
- Wade–Giles: Shao⁴-lin² wu³ tzu³
- Tongyong Pinyin: Shào-lín wǔ zǔ
- IPA: [ʂâʊlǐn ù tsù]
Yue: Cantonese
- Yale Romanization: Siu làhm ngh jóu
- Jyutping: Siu^{3} lam^{4} ng^{5} zou^{2}
- Canton Romanization: Siu^{3} lem^{4} ng^{5} zou^{2}
- IPA: [ɕīːu lɐ̏m ŋ̬̍ tsǒu]

In Southern Chinese folklore, the Five Elders of Shaolin (Chinese: 少林五祖; pinyin: Shàolín wǔ zǔ; Jyutping: Siu3 lam4 ng5 zou2), also known as the Five Generals are the survivors of one of the destructions of the Shaolin temple by the Qing Dynasty, variously said to have taken place in 1647 or in 1732.

The original Shaolin Monastery was built on the north side of Shaoshi Mountain, the central peak of Mount Song, one of the sacred mountains of China, located in the Henan Province, by Emperor Xiaowen of Northern Wei Dynasty in 477. At various times throughout history, the monastery has been destroyed (burned down) for political reasons, and rebuilt many times.

A number of traditions also make reference to a Southern Shaolin Monastery located in Fujian province. Associated with stories of the supposed burning of Shaolin by the Qing government and with the tales of the Five Elders, this temple, sometimes known by the name Changlin, is often claimed to have been either the target of Qing forces or a place of refuge for monks displaced by attacks on the original Shaolin Monastery. Besides the debate over the historicity of the Qing-era destruction, it is unknown whether there was a true southern temple, with several locations in Fujian given as the site for the monastery. Fujian does have a historic monastery called Changlin, and a monastery referred to as a "Shaolin cloister" has existed in Fuqing, Fujian, since the Song Dynasty. Whether these have any actual connection to the Henan monastery or a martial tradition is still unknown.

== The Five Elders of Shaolin ==
Within many martial arts circles, the original Five Elders of Shaolin are said to be:

- Ji Sin (Gee Sin) (simplified Chinese: 至善禅师; traditional Chinese: 至善禪師; pinyin: Zhì Shàn Chán Shī; Cantonese Yale: Zi3 Sin6 Sim4 Si1). Speculated to be also known as Chi Thien Su.
- Ng Mui (五梅大师; 五梅大師; Wǔ Méi Dà Shī; Ng5 Mui4 Daai6 Si1). Noted for Ng Mui Kuen, Wing Chun Kuen, Dragon style, and Five-Pattern Hung Kuen.
- Bak Mei (Pei Mei) (白眉道人; Bái Méi Dào Rén; Baak6 Mei4 Dou6 Jan4). Literally "Taoist with White Eyebrows". Speculated to be also known as Chu Long Tuyen.
- Fung Dou Dak (冯道德; 馮道德; Féng Dào Dé; Fung4 Dou6 Dak1). Taoist founder of Bak Fu Pai.
- Miu Hin (苗显; 苗顯; Miáo Xiǎn; Miu4 Hin2). An "unshaved" (lay) Shaolin disciple.

== The Five Family Elders ==
The founders of the five major family styles of Southern Chinese martial arts were all students of Gee Sin (see above), and are sometimes referred to as the Five Elders. This has caused some confusion.

- Hung Hei Gun (Chinese: 洪熙官; pinyin: Hóng Xīguān; Cantonese Yale: Hung4 Hei1 Gun1). Founder of Hung Ga.
- Lau Saam Ngaan (刘三眼; 劉三眼; Liú Sān Yǎn; Lau4 Saam1 Ngaan5). Literally "Three-Eyes" Lau; founder of Lau Gar.
- Choi Gau Yi (蔡九仪; 蔡九儀; Cài Jiǔ Yí; Coi3 Gau2 Ji4). Founder of Choi Gar.
- Lei Yau Saan (李友山; Lǐ Yǒu Shān; Lei5 Jau5 Saan1). Founder of Lei Gar; teacher of Choy Li Fut founder Chan Heung.
- Mok Ching Giu (莫清矫; 莫清矯; Mò Qīng Jiǎo; Mok6 Cing1 Giu2). Founder of Mok Gar.

== See also ==
- Fong Sai-Yuk
- Shaolin kung fu
- Tiandihui/Hongmen
