= Huashoutai =

Former Buddhist monastery in China

Coordinates: 23.254437°N 114.025383°E

Huashoutai, or commonly known in its Cantonese name Wa Sau Toi (simplified Chinese: 华首台; traditional Chinese: 華首台; pinyin: huāshǒutái), was a Buddhist monastery on the sacred mountain Luofushan. It was destroyed in 1949.

It is located in Boluo County, Huizhou, Guangdong, China. The tradition of Lung Ying can be traced back to the Shaolin Huashoutai Temple, the Cantonese Wa Sau Toi, on Luo Fu Shan mountain in Guangdong province, Southern China. Developed by the Buddhist monks, it provides physical health and wellbeing and protects others. It also develops energetic and spiritual connection to the universe. Lung Ying means 'Dragon Shape/Style'. Till 1890, it was practiced in the monasteries.

== History ==
The Chan teacher and Southern Dragon Kung Fu master Daai Yuk was a monk at Wa Sau Toi.

Lai Chi, the founder of the Wu Jo An nunnery in Guangzhou, was 35th generation in the Caodong school of Chan Buddhism from Wa Sau Toi.

The Shaolin Kung Fu classes are held in Berlin Pankow, Germany.
