= Abbot of Shaolin =

1979 Hong Kong film by Ho Meng Hua

- Poster bearing the alternative title A Slice of Death
- Directed by: Ho Meng Hua
- Written by: Ni Kuang
- Produced by: Sir Run Run Shaw
- Starring: David Chiang; Lo Lieh; Lily Li
- Cinematography: Yau Kei
- Edited by: Chiang Hsing-Lung
- Music by: Eddie H. Wang Chi-Ren
- Production company: Shaw Brothers Studio
- Release date: 11 July 1979 (Hong Kong)
- Running time: 84 minutes
- Country: Hong Kong
- Languages: Mandarin; Cantonese

Abbot of Shaolin (Chinese: 少林英雄榜), also known as Shaolin Abbot or A Slice of Death, is a Shaw Brothers film directed by Ho Meng Hua. It is a Shaolin Temple-themed martial arts film about their rebellion against the Qing, featuring David Chiang and Lo Lieh as Priest Pai Mei.

== Plot ==
The Monk Chi San (David Chiang) is sent by his Shaolin masters to learn a special kung fu from a Wu-Tang priest and befriends his niece Wu Mei (Lily Li). The priest's brother is Pai Mei (Lo Lieh), who disapproves of his associating with Shaolin rebels who oppose the Qing, leaves as his nephew Dao De (Ku Kuan Chun) remains behind to cause trouble for Chi San. While Chi San is in training, the Qing soldiers and a northern Lama attack and destroy Shaolin Temple. Chi San arrives too late as the attack has already run its course. His master orders him to go to the south to search for loyal Shaolin men and rebuild the temple.

Pai Mei is promoted by the court, returns to his brother's temple, and arranges for his nephew to poison him. He then attacks the priest himself and kills him for teaching Chi San kung fu. Pai Mei orders the search for Chi San so that he may kill him. Chi San arrives in the south and assists a local businessman, Mr. Li who is being robbed. The grateful man takes Chi San into his home. At this point Chi San gains his first student, Jin Lun nephew of Mr Li and goes through various integrity "tests" from local businessmen to prove if he is a true Shaolin monk. Chi San succeeds and the impressed businessmen offer to help him rebuild the temple. Chi San also gains more students after a butcher and a knife grinder fail in their attempts to beat him at kung fu.

Pai Mei and his nephew then attempt to kill Wu Mei, but she is rescued by Chi San and his students. Chi San orders his students to head south to wait on a ferry while he pursues Pai Mei and the Lama. Chi San meets the lama in the woods and defeats him but Pai Mei intercepts Wu Mei and the students. Chi San arrives before Pai Mei can kill them and defeats Pai Mei.

== Cast ==
- David Chiang a.k.a. David Chiang Da-Wei as Monk Chi San
- Lo Lieh as Pai Mei
- Ching Miao a.k.a. Cheng Miu as Mr. Li
- Ku Kuan-Chung as Dao De
- Lily Li a.k.a. Lily Li-Li as Wu Mei
- Norman Chui as Li Jin-Lun
- Yeung Chi-Hing as Wu Chan
- Chiang Tao as Tibetan Lama/Yuan Guan
- Helen Poon Bing-Seung as Miss Jinbao
- Si Wai as Emperor
- Bruce Tong Yim-Chaan as Shaolin recruit Hong Xi-Guan
- Chan Shen as Dan Tian-Gang
- Shum Lo as Head Abbot
- Yue Wing as General Yue Ying-Qi
- Chiang Nan as General Li
- Sai Gwa-Pau as Stuttering servant
- Wong Ching-Ho as Wang
- Jamie Luk Kim-Ming as Shaolin recruit Lin
- Wang Han-Chen as Magistrate
- Ng Hong-Sang as Shaolin recruit Gong Qian-Jin
- Keung Hon as Li Ba-Shan
- Lee Sau-Kei as Rich man
- Wong Chi-Ming as Bandit
- Hsu Hsia as Soldier
- Siu Tak-Foo as Shaolin student
- Chik Ngai-Hung as Bandit
- Tam Bo as Monk
- Kwok Yan-Chi as Shaolin recruit Gui Jue-Qi
- Lui Tat as Rich man
- Tai Gwan-Tak as Traitor monk
- Huang Ha as Soldier
- Kong Chuen as Soldier
- Lau Cheun as Servant
- Gam Tin-Chue as Rich man
- Wong Kung-Miu as Servant
- Fung Ging-Man as Man at palace
