= Southern Dragon kung fu =

Chinese martial arts

Southern Dragon Kung Fu
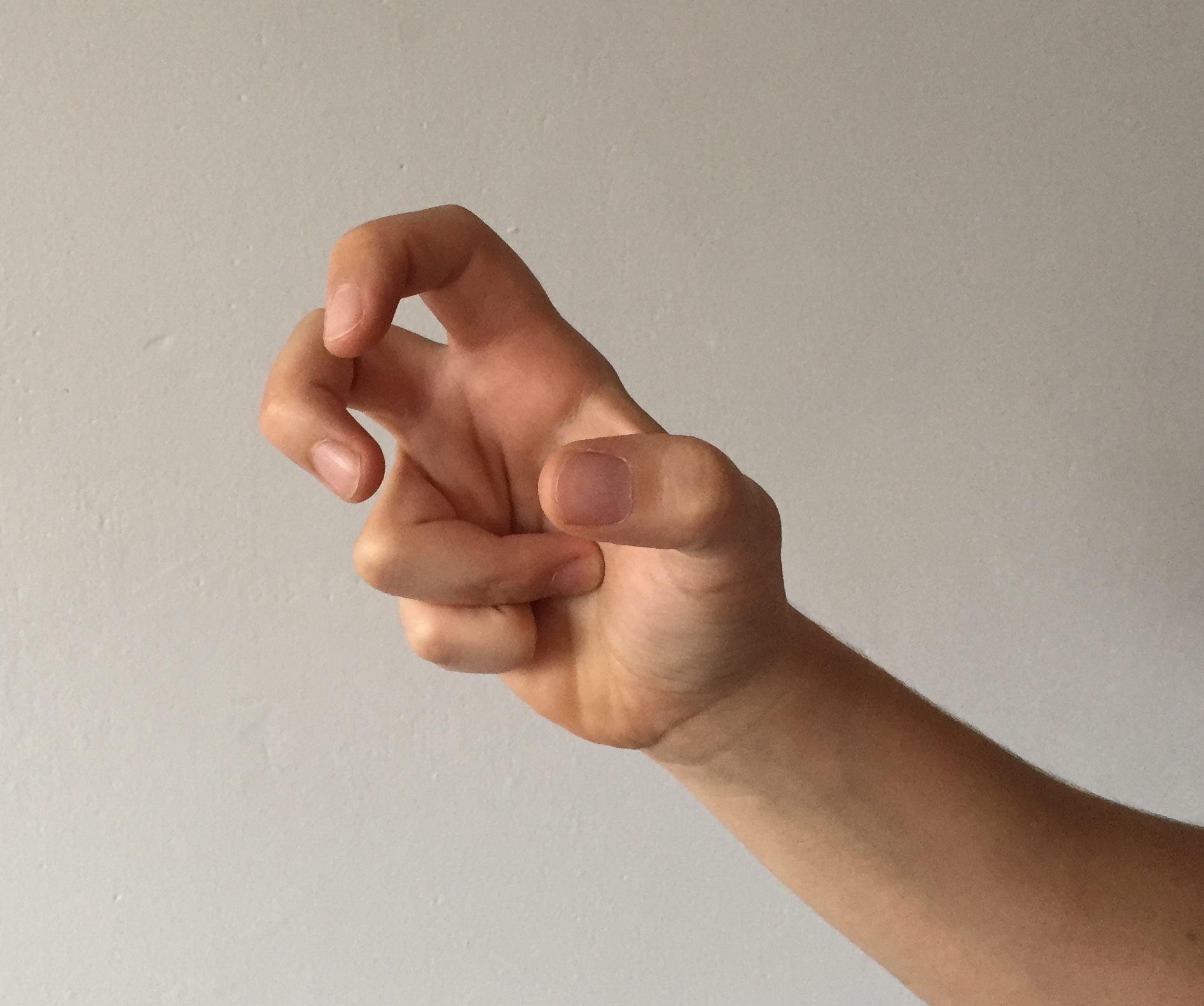
- Also known as: Lóng-Xíng Mó Qiáo, Lóng Ying Pai, Lung4 Jing4 Mo1 Kiu4
- Focus: Striking
- Country of origin: China
- Creator: Daai Yuk / Tai Yuk
- Famous practitioners: Jee Sin Sim See (Five Elders); Lam Yiu Gwai / Lam Yiu-Kwai; Jeung Lai Chuen / Cheung Lai-Chuen; Li Ah Yu
- Parenthood: Southern Shaolin Kung Fu, Lam Gar, Li (Lee) Family, Bak Mei
- Descendant arts: Bak Mei (Jeung Lai Chuen lineage)
- Olympic sport: No

Southern Dragon Kung Fu (traditional name Lung Ying "Dragon Form"; Chinese: 龍形摩橋; pinyin: lóng xíng mó qiáo; Jyutping: lung4 jing4 mo1 kiu4; lit. 'dragon shape rubbing bridges') is a Kung Fu fighting style for Shaolin Boxing based on the Chinese dragon.

== History ==
Historically, Southern Dragon style was described orally rather than by text. Modern Southern Dragon style's history can be traced to the monk Daai Yuk Sim Si, who was the abbot of Huashoutai (White Hair) temple on Mount Luofu. No reliable records of the style's origin prior to Daai exist.

Southern Dragon style has roots in a combination of the local styles of the Hakka heartland in inland eastern Guangdong, and the style that the monk Ji Sin Sim Si taught in Guangdong and the neighboring province of Fujian in the 18th century.

North of the Dongjiang, in the northwest of Boluo County in the prefecture of Huizhou in Guangdong Province, is the sacred mountain Luofushan. Luofushan is the site of many temples, including Huashoutai where, c. 1900, Daai Yuk taught Southern Dragon style to Lam Yiu Gwai, who in turn passed the art on to the many students of his schools in Guangzhou.

Lam Yiu Gwai and Jeung Lai Chuen were good friends from their youth in the Dongjiang region of Huizhou, longtime training partners, and later cousins by marriage. Lam and Jeung would open several schools together, and Southern Dragon style and Jeung's style of Bak Mei would go on to share many similarities.

A variation of the Southern Dragon style is taught by the Long Choo Kung Fu Society based in Penang, Malaysia, and with branches in Australia. Founded by Li Ah Yu and his father near the turn of the 20th century, this association claims it is teaching a Soft/Hard Dragon style originating from Fujian province.

== Methods and philosophy ==
Southern Dragons kung fu is essentially an internal qi cultivation method, but initialization training produces closer results to that of a hard, external style than the delicate approach an internal (like tai chi or baguazhang) would. In learning the moves of the style, the student will strike hard, block hard and rush into each position, with the idea of learning the proper place to be once each movement is complete. Eventually, the method of transmitting power is retained, and the physically strengthened body is able to make transitions in the proper, fluid manner. In turn, this dragon-like smoothness helps disguise the attack, making it extremely difficult for an adversary to effectively counter.

Once a purely physical semblance to flow has been mastered, the disciple incorporates the deep hissing sounds associated with the style to train chi flow. Inhaling is silent, but exhalation is deliberate, tense, and controlled. Inhaling lightens the body for aerial maneuvers, while exhaling drives power into each technique. Blocking is dispensed with, and parries or simple strikes substituted. At this point, novice and advanced student show very little in common.

On the highest level, an opponent is allowed to tire himself out, with evasion becoming the Dragon's key defense. Qi control is highly developed, and the degree to which the body must be moved to redirect or avoid impact is under greater control.

The forms (Taolu; 套路) that constitute this system are divided by complexity into three categories, and are enumerated below:

- Basic
  - 16 Movements/Holes (十六動)
  - Passing Bridge Three Times (三通過橋)
  - Fierce Tiger Leaping Over Wall (猛虎跳牆)
  - Rescue Master From Single Side (單鞭救主)
  - Single Sword and Mount (单刀匹马)
  - Press and Hit from Four Sides (四門迫打)
  - Eagle Claw (鷹爪)
  - Bridge Smashing (碎橋)
- Intermediate
  - Touch Bridge (introduces sticking hands) (龍形摩橋)
  - Venomous Snake Moves Tongue (毒蛇舐脷)
  - Hua King's Fist (化極)
  - Standing Five-Form (立五形)
  - Cross Standing Five-Form
  - Turn to Hook and Hit
  - Five Horses Returning to Stable (五馬歸槽)
- Advanced
  - Plum Flower Punch (梅花)
  - Seven Ways of Plum Flower Punch (梅花七路)

In each form, one is taught to "ride the wind", a phrase which in large part means follow rather than lead. Provide no opening without first letting your opponent open. Unlike the Crane style, which also relies heavily upon evasion as a tactic, the Dragon style evades primarily by rotation of upper or lower torso with straight and zig-zag stance movements, while the Crane stylist hops frequently to reposition the entire body. Both styles employ pinpoint strikes to vulnerable meridian targets, but the Dragon style also heavily uses tiger-like punches and clawing techniques, snake-like stance shifts, and leopard-like hit and run strikes to weaken a physically superior adversary. Southern Dragon kung fu also regularly employs low sweeping techniques, but these are not unique. Most senior stylists of any kung fu system use these on a weakened adversary.

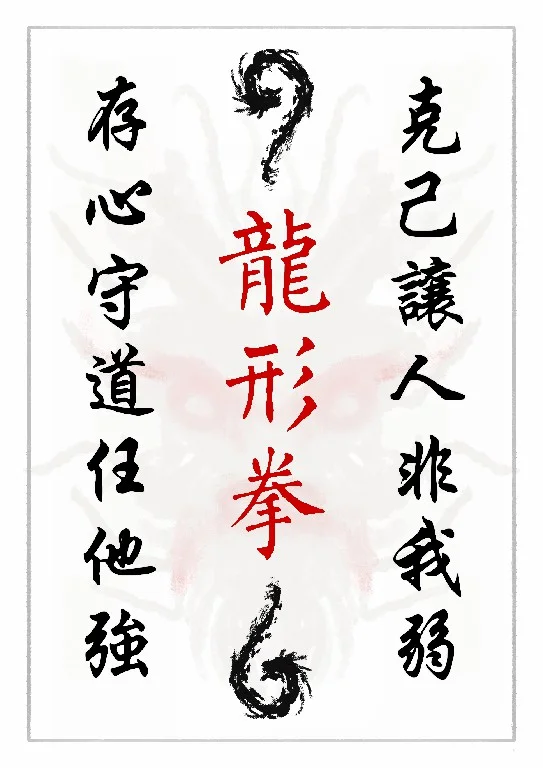
Lung Ying Motto

== Dragon style in popular culture ==
- The 2010 show A Fistful of Stances has used the Dragon style in episodes 22 and 23.
- The style was performed by Jackie Chan in Dragon Fist.
- The Dragon style is one of the three fighting styles utilized by the character Sub-Zero in the Mortal Kombat series (as seen in Mortal Kombat: Deadly Alliance and Mortal Kombat: Deception) and the character Jarek in Mortal Kombat: Armageddon. It is also Liu Kang's grapple style in Mortal Kombat: Shaolin Monks. Onaga, the boss character of Mortal Kombat: Deception, also uses a fighting style named Dragon.
- The Dragon fighting style is used at times by the police officer Lei Wulong in Tekken.
- Southern Dragon kung fu inspired some firebending techniques on the 2005–2008 Nickelodeon Animation Studio TV series Avatar: The Last Airbender, M. Night Shyamalan's 2010 film counterpart, its 2024 Netflix counterpart, and its sequel series The Legend of Korra.
- Southern Dragon was among the fighting styles used by Batman and Catwoman on the DC Comics franchises.
- Kazuma Kiryu the protagonist of the Yakuza (franchise) series uses a fighting style called 'Dragon Style' although this is not the same martial art
