= Jee Sin Sim See =

Chinese wushu practitioner

- Other names: Jee Shim, Chi Seen Chi Sin Sim Si, Ji Sin Sim Si, Zhi Shan, Zhì Shàn Chán Shī
- Style: Nanquan, Weng Chun, Wing Chun

Other information
- Occupation: Monk, Martial artist
- Notable students: Fong Sai-yuk, Hung Hei-gun

The Venerable Chi Sin Sim Si (Note: Chi Seen, Chi Sin Sim Si, Ji Sin Sim Si (Cantonese); Zhi Shan, Zhi Shan Chan Shi (Mandarin); (pinyin: Zhì Shàn Chán Shī; Cantonese Yale: Ji3 Sin6 Sim3 Si1; lit. 'Chi Sin', 'Zen teacher')- His name means "Immense Kindness.") is a legendary Chinese martial artist, said to have been one of the Five Elders, survivors of the destruction of the Shaolin Temple by the Qing Dynasty (1644–1912). He is linked to many southern Chinese martial arts including the five major family styles of Hung, Lau and Choy gar, Lee gar and Mok gar, Ng Ga Kuen/Ng Gar King and Wing Chun.

== History ==
Chi Sin is said to have originally been a resident monk of the Original Northern Song Shan Shaolin Temple, in Henan. He was a survivor of the destruction of a Southern Shaolin Temple, situated in Fujian. (Note: As the Original in the North, Henan was never burned down at that time.)

Others say that Chi Sin and the other Five Elders escaped the burning of the temple at Quanzhou 泉州 in Fujian. They went their separate ways and Chi Sin built the second southern temple at Jiulian Shan 九連山 (Nine Lotus Mountain), also in Fujian. Chi Sin was a revolutionary who planned to overthrow the Qing Government. However two of the Five Elders, Bak Mei and Fung Dou Dak joined forces with the Qing army and destroyed the second southern Shaolin Temple with a huge army outnumbering the monks 10 to 1. Chi Sin, the Abbot of the temple, was killed by Pak Mei in a duel during the attack.

Chi Sin features prominently in "Legends of Southern Shaolin” 南少林傳奇 written by Chiew Sek (Cantonese) and published in 1993. All of the legendary figures of Southern Shaolin and more widely, southern Chinese martial arts ('Nanquan/Nam Kuen') 南拳 are in some way associated with the legendary figure of Chi Sin such as Fong Sai-yuk 方世玉, Ng Mui, Luk Ah-choi陸阿采, Lei Jou-fan 李祖寬, Wu Wai-kin 胡惠乾 and Hung Hei-gun 洪熙官 to name a few. Chi Sin has been portrayed in many Chinese martial arts movies.

至善禪師
Chi Sin Sim See
Pinyin:	Zhì Shàn Chán Shī
Cantonese Yale:	Ji3 Sin6 Sim3 Si1
Literally	"Chi Sin, Zen teacher"

== See also ==
- Southern Shaolin Monastery
- Bak Mei
- Fong Sai-yuk
- Ng Mui

== Bibliography ==
- Chu, Robert; Ritchie, Rene; Wu, Y. (2015). The Definitive Guide to Wing Chun's History and Tradition. Tuttle Publishing. ISBN 9781462917532.
- Leung, Ting (2000). Roots and Branches of Wing Tsun, Second edition (January 1, 2000). Leung Ting Co, Hong Kong. ISBN 9627284238.
