= Mok Gar =

Mok Gar 莫家拳
- Also known as: Mok Gar Kuen, Mo Jia Quan, Mok Family Style
- Focus: Striking, weapons training
- Country of origin: China
- Creator: Mok Ta Shi (original developer); Mok Ching Giu of the Five Elders (founder)
- Famous practitioners: Mok Ding Yue; Mo Lin Ying; Mo Fifth Brother; Mo Ta Fen; Mok Kwai-lan
- Parenthood: Southern Shaolin Kung Fu, Mojiaquan, Mok gar was called Shaolin Quan until it was made famous by the Mok Clan in Dongguan area of China
- Descendant arts: Hung Gar (Wong Fei Hung lineage)
- Olympic sport: No

Mok Gar (莫家拳) is one of the five major family styles of Southern Chinese martial arts. It was developed by a Shaolin monk named Monk Mok Da Shi (in Cantonese “Jyutping” pronounced Mok6 Daat6 Si6) (in mainland Chinese Mandarin “Pinyin” pronounced Mò Dá Shì) (莫達士) as an inheritance of the Southern Shaolin Fist in Guangdong province in China.

It gained fame three generations later, in the Qing Dynasty, with Mok Gin Kiu/Mo Qing Chiu/Mo Ching Chiao (莫清矯; also known as Mok Sau Cheung/ Mo Ta Chang) who learned the art from a monk named Wai Jen, and also had supposedly learned from a famous kicker, Choy Kao Yee. Mok's reputation was so high after defeating many other boxers that the style, formerly known as Southern Shaolin Quan, was renamed for the Mok family (Mok Gar). Mok Ching Kiu then taught the art to his son, Mok Ding Yue and three other students in which all four of them became their own distinct style of the art. Different generations through Guangdong boasted masters such as Mo Lin Ying, Mo Fifth Brother and Mo Ta Fen.

The Hung Gar lineage from Wong Fei Hung has influences of Mok Gar from his fourth wife Mok Kwai-lan, who after the death of Wong Fei Hung ran his medical clinic and school until her death many years later.

At present there are said to be two branches of Mok. The first is a direct lineage from Mok Qing Chiu and the other traces to Mak Shing Mo.

== Techniques ==
Mok Gar emphasizes clinch fighting techniques and also powerful low kicking techniques. Mok Gar fighters fight so close, it is said they fight chest to chest, cheek to cheek, breath to breath. Some of the kicks from this style include: Guo Men Jiao (Pass the Gate Kick), Zhi Jie Ce Jiao (Direct Side Kick), Pao Jiao (Hurling Kick), She Jiao (Absorbing Kick). Mok Gar training also includes a full range of weapons training. Special stances include Mu Ren Chan (Wooden Man Stance), and Pian Shen Ma (Deflecting Stance). Mok Gar techniques are based on simplicity and using maximum leverage. These techniques are used for a smaller, weaker person to combat someone who is bigger and stronger. Some forms include Zhong Quan, Lau Gar Kuen, a "borrowed" form from the Lau Gar style, and Lian Tui Quan.
