= Bak Mei =

Legendary Chinese martial arts master and Southern Kung Fu style

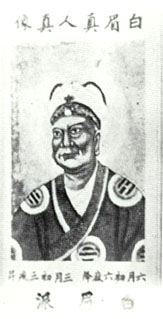
- Native name: 白眉
- Other names: Bai Mei; Pai Mei; Pak Mei
- Style: Chinese martial arts Bak Mei Kung Fu

Bak Mei (Chinese: 白眉; pinyin: Bái Méi; Wade–Giles: Pai Mei; Cantonese Yale: Baahk Mèih; lit. 'White Eyebrow') is a semi-mythical 17th-century figure of Chinese martial arts folklore. He is said to have been one of the legendary Five Elders—survivors of the fictional destruction of the Shaolin Monastery. In later folklore traditions, he is sometimes portrayed as having betrayed Shaolin to the imperial government.

In modern popular culture, Bak Mei has been depicted in Wuxia literature and Hong Kong martial arts films such as Executioners from Shaolin (1977), Abbot of Shaolin (1979), and Clan of the White Lotus (1980). Bak Mei is better known in the West as Pai Mei, played by Gordon Liu in the Hollywood action films Kill Bill: Volume 2 (2004) and Kill Bill: The Whole Bloody Affair (2004).

He is the namesake of the South Chinese martial art attributed to him: Bak Mei Kung Fu.

== Background ==
Bak Mei is a figure from Southern Chinese martial arts folklore, where oral tradition, legend, and popular literature often blur the line between history and fiction. Most information about him comes from these traditions, rather than contemporary records. Therefore, Bak Mei is generally considered a legendary construct rather than an historically verified figure.

He is typically described as a Daoist ascetic with striking white eyebrows, from which is name is derived, and a powerful martial art master. He appears in stories of the burning of one or more Shaolin temple, and is listed as one of its five survivors. These accounts are inconsistent and often contradictory but usually take place during the Ming-Qing transition in the 17th or sometimes 18th century. Bak Mei's role differs across versions of the story. In some, he is portrayed as a villainous traitor who betrayed Shaolin for selfish motives, while in others, he is depicted as a coerced figure acting to protect his followers.

Stories of Bak Mei became particularly widespread in the 19th century through Wuxia novels during a period of Qing decline and strong anti-Qing sentiment. His portrayal as a traitor contributed to real tensions between practitioners of Bak Mei Kung Fu and those from other Shaolin-related traditions.

== Legendary narratives ==
In several versions of the legend, Bak Mei is described as a former Shaolin monk who came into conflict with other figures of the temple, particularly Jee Sin. Some traditions portray him as rejecting loyalty to the fallen Ming dynasty, which he saw as corrupt and beyond recovery, while others claim he acted under pressure from Qing authorities.

Accounts differ on the location and nature of the Shaolin temple’s destruction. Some traditions situate the events at a fictional Southern Shaolin temple in Fujian province, while others place them in Henan or describe multiple destructions occurring over time. The role of Qing forces also differs between narratives.

Descriptions of his death are also inconsistent, ranging from being killed by rival martial artists in retribution for his betrayal of Shaolin to dying by poisoning or in obscurity.

== Lineage-based traditions ==
Several Bak Mei Kung Fu lineages preserve oral traditions that identify him as the founder of the style, though these accounts do not rely on contemporaneous Qing sources.

Within the traditions associated with masters Jie Kon Sieuw and Nam Wan, Bak Mei is described as a Taoist practitioner rather than a Chan Buddhist monk. While still situated within the southern Shaolin milieu of the Ming–Qing transition, these accounts emphasize his later association with Daoist practice.

He is presented as one of the Shaolin Five Elders who survived Qing suppression, with greater focus on their subsequent dispersion than on the destruction of specific temples. Bak Mei is said to have relocated to Mount Emei, a site commonly associated with both Buddhist and Taoist cultivation in martial arts folklore.

Unlike popular retellings of him as a traitor, these traditions frame his withdrawal from anti-Qing resistance as a pragmatic decision rather than active collaboration. This interpretation forms the basis for the transmission of Bak Mei Kung Fu within these traditions.

== Bak Mei Kung Fu ==
Bak Mei Kung Fu (白眉派), also known as Bak Mei Pai ("White Eyebrow sect"), is a southern Chinese martial art traditionally attributed to the figure of Bak Mei. The art formed and spread in Guangdong province, especially in the regions of Huizhou, Guangzhou, Foshan, and later Hong Kong.

Bak Mei Kung Fu 白眉功夫
- Also known as: Hakka Bak-Mei; Bai Mei; Pai Mei; Pak Mei
- Focus: Striking
- Country of origin: China
- Creator: Traditional founder: Bak Mei of the Five Elders; Historical Founder: Jeung Lai Chuen
- Famous practitioners: Jeung Lai Chuen; Lau Siu-Leung
- Parenthood: Southern Chinese martial arts, particularly Hakka systems, Dragon Style Kung Fu
- Olympic sport: No

=== Characteristics ===
Bak Mei kung Fu is characterized by powerful, short-range striking and an emphasis on structural efficiency and explosive force. Movements are compact and direct, with techniques often used to intercept, jam, and counter an opponent at close range. Some applications involve throwing, takedowns, and restraining techniques. The system also includes low sweeping techniques and leg checks, which are used to disrupt an opponent's balance and support close-range striking.

The Pak Mei system is also known for its "Phoenix Eye Fist" (Fung Ngaan Chui in Cantonese). This technique involves striking with the extended knuckle of the index finger, targeting vital points such as the eyes, throat, temples, or solar plexus with explosive force.

Like other southern Chinese martial arts, it incorporates the four core principles of fau (float), chum (sink), tun (swallow), and tou (spit), which describe changes in body energy and intent during combat.

The style also classifies six types of trained power including six major body parts: ngaa (teeth), but (neck), gin (shoulder), sau (hands), jiu (waist) and goek (feet). Traditional accounts often describe the style using tiger and leopard imagery, reflecting an emphasis on aggressive forward pressure, strong rooting, and explosive close-range power.

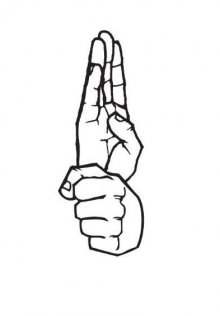
Bak Mei salute

=== Transmission and lineages ===
According to Bak Mei lineages, the art is said to have originated at Mount Emei with the figure of Bak Mei. In these accounts, Bak Mei is credited with transmitting the art to figures largely confined to oral tradition, beginning with the Chan monk Gwong Wai (often rendered in Mandarin as Guǎng Huì, 廣惠). The art was later passed on to the Chan monk Juk Faat Wan (also spelled Chuk Fat-wan or in Mandarin: Zhú Fǎyún, 竺法雲). These figures form the traditional foundation of later Bak Mei lineages.

=== Historical Development and modernization ===
In historical terms, modern Bak Mei kung fu developed primarily in Guangdong during the late Qing and Republican periods and had links to secret societies such as the Heaven and Earth Society. Its most influential (and earliest documented) figure was Cheung Lai-chuen (1882–1964), also known in Mandarin as Zhāng Lǐquán (张礼泉), a native of Huizhou. Cheung had prior training in several southern Chinese styles before studying a style called Bak Mei under a Buddhist monk referred to as Juk Faat Wan, in a temple near Guangzhou. The historical veracity of this account remains uncertain due to the lack of independent evidence.

Drawing on his experiences, Cheung systematized Bak Mei into a distinct style. His background in Hakka martial arts and his close association with Lam Yiu-Kwai (1877-1966), a key figure in Dragon style kung fu, contributed to the technical character of his Bak Mei lineage. Through his teaching activities, the art spread and developed several regional schools. The most influential branch developed in Guangzhou, while another significant branch emerged in Foshan, traditionally associated with Taoist lineages linked to the legendary Shaolin Elder Fung Dou Dak (also rendered as Fung Do-duk, Fung Tao Tak or, in Mandarin: Féng Dàodé 馮道德) and to Lau Siu-leung (1906–1977; Mandarin: Liu Shaoliang, 刘少良).

==== Global Spread (20th Century) ====
After Cheung's relocation to Hong Kong following the communist takeover in 1949, the art was preserved and transmitted by his family members and senior disciples, with the city becoming an important center for its continuation. From there, Bak Mei gained popularity and became more accessible to practitioners outside of China. In the 1950s and 1960s, Chinese communities brought the art to Malaysia and Singapore. In the 1960s and 1970s, Bak Mei arrived in Western countries, such as the United States, Canada, and Australia, as Chinese immigrants opened schools in their new communities. A prominent figure in the West was Paul Chan (Chan Wai-Kwong), a student of Cheung Lai Chuen, who helped introduce Bak Mei to North America in the 1970s. In Europe, Bak Mei schools began appearing from the late 20th century in countries such as the Netherlands, Belgium, UK, Germany, France, Czech Republic. During these decades, several secretive 'closed-door' schools emigrated from China; however, their histories remain undocumented due to their private nature.

=== Curriculum ===
Bak Mei Kung Fu does not have a single central authority. Its lineages diverged early, so the names, order, and content of forms vary between schools. However, training often centers on a small number of core hand forms. These forms emphasize repetition, symmetry of movement, and methods typical of southern Chinese martial arts.

Forms commonly cited include Jik Bo (Straight Step), Gau Bo Toi (Nine Step Push), and Sup Jee (Cross Pattern). Bak Mei also emphasize the concept of Fa Jing (Explosive Power).

Breathing, timing, and qigong are fundamental components of Bak Mei training. Techniques emphasize whole-body coordination, with footwork and hand movements executed together. Traditional Bak Mei schools also include free sparring.

==== Weapons ====
Weapons training exists in some Bak Mei lineages but it is not universal and usually comes after empty-hand practice. When taught, weapons are usually introduced at an advanced stage and include a limited number of traditional southern Chinese weapons. As with hand forms, the selection of weapons vary between schools.

Some schools also teach special weapons, which vary by lineage. These can include:

- Dai Pa (Tiger Fork): A heavy three-pronged fork, often used in Zo Jau Dai Pa (Left-Right Tiger Fork).
- Seung Gwai (Tonfa): Usually taught as a pair, known as the Pak Mei Double Tonfa.
- Sin Fa Bo Dang (Bench): A traditional piece of furniture adapted for fighting.
- Guan Dao (Glaive): A heavy polearm, specifically the Pak Mei Guan Dao.
- Emei Ci (Emei Piercers): A pair of sharp, dagger-like weapons.

=== Bak Mei Pai in Popular culture ===
Bak Mei Kung fu has appeared occasionally in popular culture.

- In Quentin Tarantino's 2004 Kill Bill: Volume 2, a master of Bak Mei and Eagle Claw is the lead character's martial arts teacher. That master has white eyebrows and is called Pai Mei, a name based on the Mandarin pronunciation of Bak Mei.
- In the 2019 Netflix series Seis Manos, the character Silencio uses Bak Mei Kung Fu. As a visual reference to the style's name ("White Eyebrow"), his eyebrows become progressively whiter over the course of the series.
- The 2022 video game Sifu by Sloclap prominently features the Pak Mei style as its main combat system.
