= List of awards and nominations received by Michelle Yeoh =

Michelle Yeoh awards and nominations
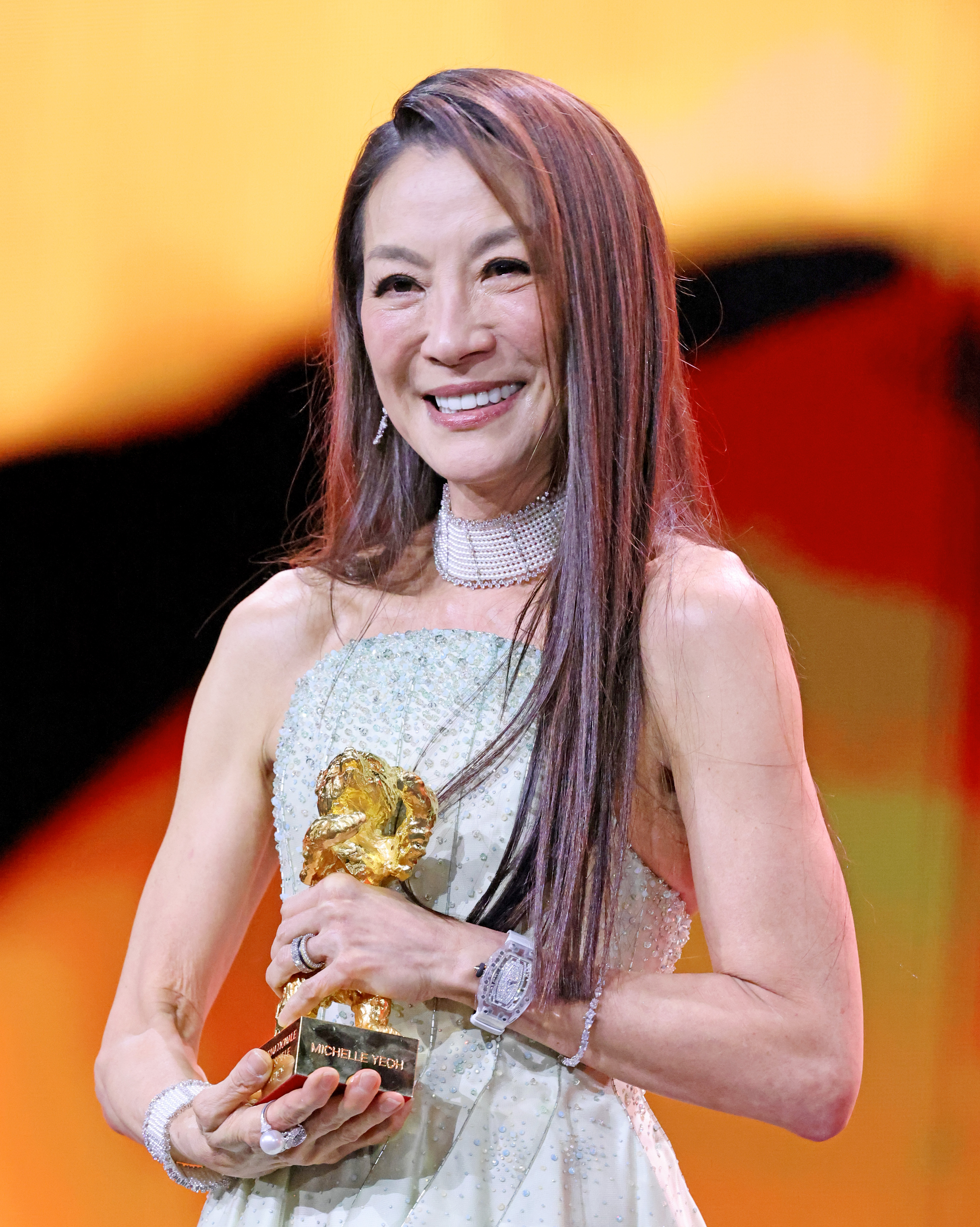
- Yeoh with the 2026 Honorary Golden Bear
Awards and nominations
Award	Wins	Nominations
Academy Awards	1	1
Actor Awards	2	4
Asian Film Awards	0	1
British Academy Film Awards	0	2
Critics' Choice Movie Awards	0	3
Critics' Choice Super Awards	1	5
Golden Globe Awards	1	1
Golden Horse Awards	0	1
Hong Kong Film Awards	0	3

Michelle Yeoh is a Malaysian actress who has received many awards and nominations. Following a spinal injury that prevented Yeoh from pursuing a professional ballet career, she began competing in beauty pageants. In 1983, she was crowned Miss World Malaysia at the age of 20 and represented her country in the Miss World pageant, where she placed 18th overall. A year later, she went on to win the title Miss Moomba International in Australia.

Michelle Yeoh's first starring role in Yes, Madam earned her her first nomination at the Hong Kong Film Awards for Best New Performer. In 1998, Yeoh received her second nomination for Best Supporting Actress for The Soong Sisters. In the same year, Yeoh's first role in Hollywood in the James Bond film Tomorrow Never Dies earned her an MTV Movie & TV Awards nomination in the Best Fight category. In the early 21st century, Yeoh gained widespread recognition for her role in Crouching Tiger, Hidden Dragon, the first foreign-language film to surpass $100 million at the box office in the United States, (Note: Multiple sources.) which brought her numerous award nominations, including the British Academy Film Awards, Chlotrudis Awards, Saturn Awards, Hong Kong Film Awards, Golden Horse Awards, Toronto Film Critics Association, Vancouver Film Critics Circle. She was also awarded Best Film Actress by the Ethnic Multicultural Media Academy.

The next era was marked by fluctuations in the actress's career. She embarked on producing her first two English-language films, The Touch and Silver Hawk, through Mythical Company, Yeoh's own production company, earning her two Huabiao Awards for Outstanding Co-Production Film. In 2011, Yeoh received Satellite Award and Asian Film Award nominations for her performance as a Nobel Peace Prize laureate Aung San Suu Kyi, and for her role in the wuxia film Reign of Assassins. Seven years later, her participation in the series Star Trek: Discovery earned her a second Saturn Award nomination in the category Best Guest Starring Role on Television. Additionally, the success of the project Crazy Rich Asians has resulted in further nominations, including those from the AARP Movies for Grownups Awards, Dorian Awards, Actor Awards, as well as a Best Cast award from the National Board of Review.

As the female lead in the film Everything Everywhere All at Once (2022), she received her second British Academy Film Award nomination and earned multiple accolades, including the National Board of Review, Critics' Choice Super, Satellite, and Saturn Awards. Her Golden Globe win made her the second actress of Asian descent to win Best Actress in a Motion Picture (Musical or Comedy), after Awkwafina. (Note: Multiple sources.) She was also the first Asian woman to win the Actor Award for Outstanding Performance by a Female Actor in a Leading Role. (Note: Multiple sources.) On March 12, 2023, Yeoh won the Academy Award for Best Actress, becoming the first Asian actress to receive the award in the 95-year history of the Academy of Motion Picture Arts and Sciences, (Note: Multiple sources.) which was recognized by Guinness World Records, and the second woman of color to win in that category after Halle Berry. (Note: Multiple sources.) She is also only the second Asian performer nominated for Best Actress, following Merle Oberon in 1936. (Note: Multiple sources.)

== Major associations ==
=== Academy Awards ===
Year	Category	Nominated work	Result	Ref.
2023	Best Actress	Everything Everywhere All at Once	Won	

=== Actor Awards ===
Year	Category	Nominated work	Result	Ref.
2019	Outstanding Performance by a Cast in a Motion Picture	Crazy Rich Asians	Nominated	
2023	Outstanding Performance by a Cast in a Motion Picture	Everything Everywhere All at Once	Won	
2023	Outstanding Performance by a Female Actor in a Leading Role	Everything Everywhere All at Once	Won	
2025	Outstanding Performance by a Cast in a Motion Picture	Wicked	Nominated	

=== Asian Film Awards ===
Year	Category	Nominated work	Result	Ref.
2011	Best Actress	Reign of Assassins	Nominated	

=== BAFTA Awards ===
Year	Category	Nominated work	Result	Ref.
British Academy Film Awards
2001	Best Actress in a Leading Role	Crouching Tiger, Hidden Dragon	Nominated	
2023	Best Actress in a Leading Role	Everything Everywhere All at Once	Nominated	

=== Critics' Choice Awards ===
Year	Category	Nominated work	Result	Ref.
Critics' Choice Movie Awards
2023	Best Actress	Everything Everywhere All at Once	Nominated	
2023	Best Acting Ensemble	Everything Everywhere All at Once	Nominated	
2025	Best Acting Ensemble	Wicked	Nominated	
Critics' Choice Super Awards
2022	Best Actress in a Superhero Movie	Shang-Chi and the Legend of the Ten Rings	Nominated	
2023	Best Actress in a Science Fiction/Fantasy Movie	Everything Everywhere All at Once	Won	
2024	Best Actress in a Science Fiction/Fantasy Series, Limited Series or Made-for-TV Movie	American Born Chinese	Nominated	
2024	Best Superhero Series, Limited Series or Made-for-TV Movie	American Born Chinese	Nominated	
2025	Best Actress in a Science Fiction/Fantasy Series, Limited Series or Made-for-TV Movie	Star Trek: Section 31	Nominated	

=== Golden Globe Awards ===
Year	Category	Nominated work	Result	Ref.
2023	Best Actress in a Motion Picture – Musical or Comedy	Everything Everywhere All at Once	Won	

=== Golden Horse Awards ===
Year	Category	Nominated work	Result	Ref.
2000	Best Leading Actress	Crouching Tiger, Hidden Dragon	Nominated	

=== Hong Kong Film Awards ===
Year	Category	Nominated work	Result	Ref.
1986	Best New Performer	Yes, Madam	Nominated	
1998	Best Supporting Actress	The Soong Sisters	Nominated	
2001	Best Actress	Crouching Tiger, Hidden Dragon	Nominated	

== Other associations ==
Organizations (Note: Awards, festivals, honors and other miscellaneous organizations are listed in alphabetical order.)	Year (Note: Year in which award ceremony was held.)	Category	Work	Result	Ref.
AACTA International Awards	2023	Best Lead Actress	Everything Everywhere All at Once	Nominated	
AARP Movies for Grownups Awards	2019	Best Supporting Actress	Crazy Rich Asians	Nominated	
AARP Movies for Grownups Awards	2023	Best Actress	Everything Everywhere All at Once	Won	
Alliance of Women Film Journalists	2023	Best Actress	Everything Everywhere All at Once	Won	
Alliance of Women Film Journalists	2023	Most Daring Performance	Everything Everywhere All at Once	Nominated	
Alliance of Women Film Journalists	2023	Grand Dame Award for Defying Ageism	—	Nominated	
Alliance of Women Film Journalists	2023	Outstanding Achievement by a Woman in the Film Industry	—	Nominated	
Ammy Awards	2001	Best Female Actor	Crouching Tiger, Hidden Dragon	Won	
Astra Film Awards	2023	Best Actress	Everything Everywhere All at Once	Won	
Astra Film Awards	2023	Best Cast Ensemble	Everything Everywhere All at Once	Won	
Astra Midseason Film Awards	2022	Best Actress	Everything Everywhere All at Once	Won	
Austin Film Critics Association	2023	Best Actress	Everything Everywhere All at Once	Won	
Austin Film Critics Association	2023	Best Ensemble	Everything Everywhere All at Once	Won	
Behind The Voice Actors Awards	2012	Best Vocal Ensemble in a Feature Film	Kung Fu Panda 2	Won (Note: Shared with the cast in Kung Fu Panda 2.)	
Blockbuster Entertainment Awards	2001	Favorite Action Team	Crouching Tiger, Hidden Dragon	Nominated	
Boston Society of Film Critics	2022	Best Actress	Everything Everywhere All at Once	Won	
Chicago Film Critics Association	2022	Best Actress	Everything Everywhere All at Once	Nominated	
Chlotrudis Awards	2001	Best Actress	Crouching Tiger, Hidden Dragon	Nominated	
Dallas–Fort Worth Film Critics Association	2022	Best Actress	Everything Everywhere All at Once	Runner-up	
Dorian Awards	2019	Film Performance of the Year – Supporting Actress	Crazy Rich Asians	Nominated	
Dorian Awards	2023	Film Performance of the Year	Everything Everywhere All at Once	Won	
Dublin Film Critics' Circle	2022	Best Actress	Everything Everywhere All at Once	Won	
Ethnic Multicultural Media Academy	2001	Best Film Actress	Crouching Tiger, Hidden Dragon	Won	
Florida Film Critics Circle	2022	Best Actress	Everything Everywhere All at Once	Nominated	
Florida Film Critics Circle	2022	Best Ensemble	Everything Everywhere All at Once	Won	
Georgia Film Critics Association	2023	Best Actress	Everything Everywhere All at Once	Won	
Georgia Film Critics Association	2023	Best Ensemble	Everything Everywhere All at Once	Runner-up	
Gold Derby Awards	2019	Best Ensemble	Crazy Rich Asians	Nominated	
Gold Derby Awards	2021	Drama Supporting Actress	Star Trek: Discovery	Nominated	
Gold Derby Awards	2023	Best Actress	Everything Everywhere All at Once	Won	
Gold Derby Awards	2023	Best Ensemble	Everything Everywhere All at Once	Won	
Gold List	2023	Best Performance in a Leading Role	Everything Everywhere All at Once	Won	
Golden Raspberry Awards	2026	Worst Actress	Star Trek: Section 31	Nominated	
Golden Schmoes Awards	2023	Best Actress	Everything Everywhere All at Once	Won	
Golden Schmoes Awards	2023	Favorite Celebrity	Everything Everywhere All at Once	Nominated	
Golden Schmoes Awards	2023	Coolest Character	Everything Everywhere All at Once	Nominated	
Gotham Awards	2022	Outstanding Lead Performance	Everything Everywhere All at Once	Nominated	
Houston Film Critics Society	2023	Best Actress	Everything Everywhere All at Once	Nominated	
Houston Film Critics Society	2023	Best Ensemble Cast	Everything Everywhere All at Once	Nominated	
Huabiao Awards	2002	Outstanding Co-Production Film	The Touch	Won	
Huabiao Awards	2004	Outstanding Co-Production Film	Silver Hawk	Won	
Huabiao Awards	2011	Outstanding Abroad Actress	Reign of Assassins	Nominated	
Huading Awards	2011	Best Actress	True Legend	Nominated	
Huading Awards	2023	Best Global Actress	Everything Everywhere All at Once	Won	
IGN Summer Movie Awards	2019	Best TV Ensemble	Star Trek: Discovery	Nominated	
IGN Summer Movie Awards	2022	Best Lead Performer in a Movie	Everything Everywhere All at Once	Won	
Independent Spirit Awards	2023	Best Lead Performance	Everything Everywhere All at Once	Won	
IndieWire Critics Poll	2022	Best Performance	Everything Everywhere All at Once	3rd place	
Kansas City Film Critics Circle	2023	Best Actress	Everything Everywhere All at Once	Won	
Las Vegas Film Critics Society	2022	Best Actress	Everything Everywhere All at Once	Won	
London Film Critics' Circle	2023	Actress of the Year	Everything Everywhere All at Once	Nominated	
Los Angeles Film Critics Association	2022	Best Lead Performer	Everything Everywhere All at Once	Runner-up (Note: Shared with Danielle Deadwyler)	
MTV Movie & TV Awards	1998	Best Fight	Tomorrow Never Dies	Nominated	
MTV Style Awards	2003	International Actress of The Year	—	Won	
NAACP Image Awards	2026	Outstanding Ensemble Cast in a Motion Picture	Wicked: For Good	Nominated	
National Board of Review	2018	Best Cast	Crazy Rich Asians	Won	
National Board of Review	2022	Best Actress	Everything Everywhere All at Once	Won	
National Society of Film Critics	2023	Best Actress	Everything Everywhere All at Once	Runner-up	
New York Film Critics Online	2022	Best Actress	Everything Everywhere All at Once	Won	
Nickelodeon Kids' Choice Awards	2025	Favourite Villain	Wicked	Nominated	
Online Film Critics Society	2023	Best Actress	Everything Everywhere All at Once	Won	
Phoenix Film Critics Society	2022	Best Actress in a Leading Role	Everything Everywhere All at Once	Won	
Phoenix Film Critics Society	2022	Best Ensemble Acting	Everything Everywhere All at Once	Won	
San Diego Film Critics Society	2023	Best Actress	Everything Everywhere All at Once	Nominated	
San Diego Film Critics Society	2023	Best Ensemble	Everything Everywhere All at Once	Won	
San Francisco Bay Area Film Critics Circle	2023	Best Actress	Everything Everywhere All at Once	Nominated	
Satellite Awards	2011	Best Actress – Motion Picture	The Lady	Nominated	
Satellite Awards	2023	Best Actress in a Motion Picture – Comedy or Musical	Everything Everywhere All at Once	Won	
Saturn Awards	2001	Best Actress	Crouching Tiger, Hidden Dragon	Nominated	
Saturn Awards	2018	Best Guest Starring Role on Television	Star Trek: Discovery	Nominated	
Saturn Awards	2022	Best Actress	Everything Everywhere All at Once	Won	
Seattle Film Critics Society	2023	Best Actress	Everything Everywhere All at Once	Nominated	
SESC Film Festival	2023	Best Foreign Actress	Everything Everywhere All at Once	Won	
Southeastern Film Critics Association	2022	Best Actress	Everything Everywhere All at Once	Won	
St. Louis Film Critics Association	2022	Best Actress	Everything Everywhere All at Once	Won	
St. Louis Film Critics Association	2022	Best Ensemble	Everything Everywhere All at Once	Nominated	
Teen Choice Awards	2001	Choice Movie Fight	Crouching Tiger, Hidden Dragon	Nominated	
Toronto Film Critics Association	2000	Best Actress	Crouching Tiger, Hidden Dragon	Runner-up	
Toronto Film Critics Association	2023	Best Actress	Everything Everywhere All at Once	Runner-up	
Vancouver Film Critics Circle	2001	Best Actress	Crouching Tiger, Hidden Dragon	Nominated	
Vancouver Film Critics Circle	2023	Best Actress	Everything Everywhere All at Once	Won	
Washington D.C. Area Film Critics Association	2022	Best Actress	Everything Everywhere All at Once	Nominated	
Washington D.C. Area Film Critics Association	2022	Best Ensemble	Everything Everywhere All at Once	Nominated	
Women Film Critics Circle	2011	Lifetime Achievement Award	—	Nominated	
Women Film Critics Circle	2022	Best Actress	Everything Everywhere All at Once	Won	
Women Film Critics Circle	2022	Best Screen Couple	Everything Everywhere All at Once	Won (Note: Shared with Ke Huy Quan)	

== Other accolades ==
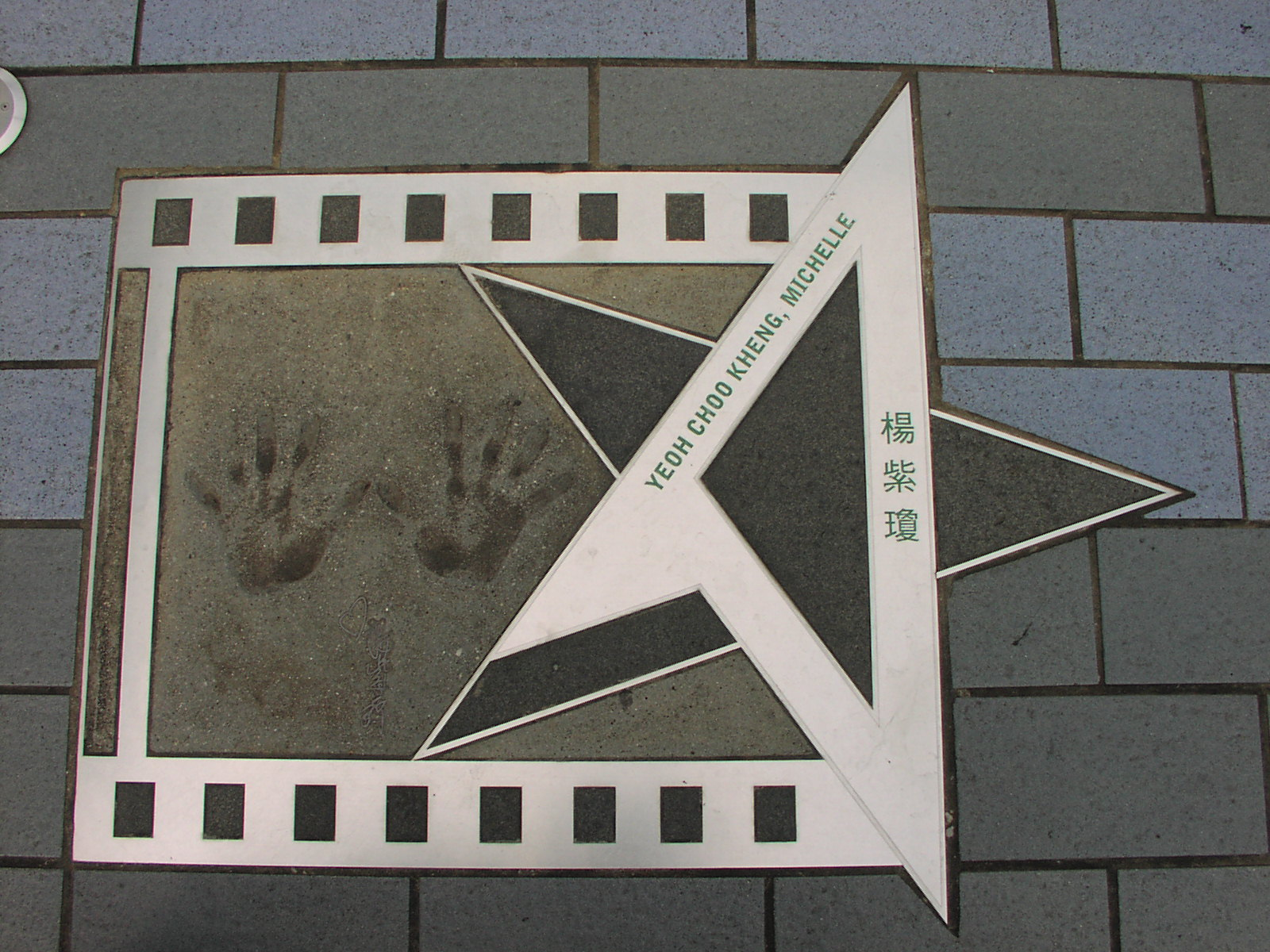
Yeoh's handprints on the Avenue of Stars, Hong Kong

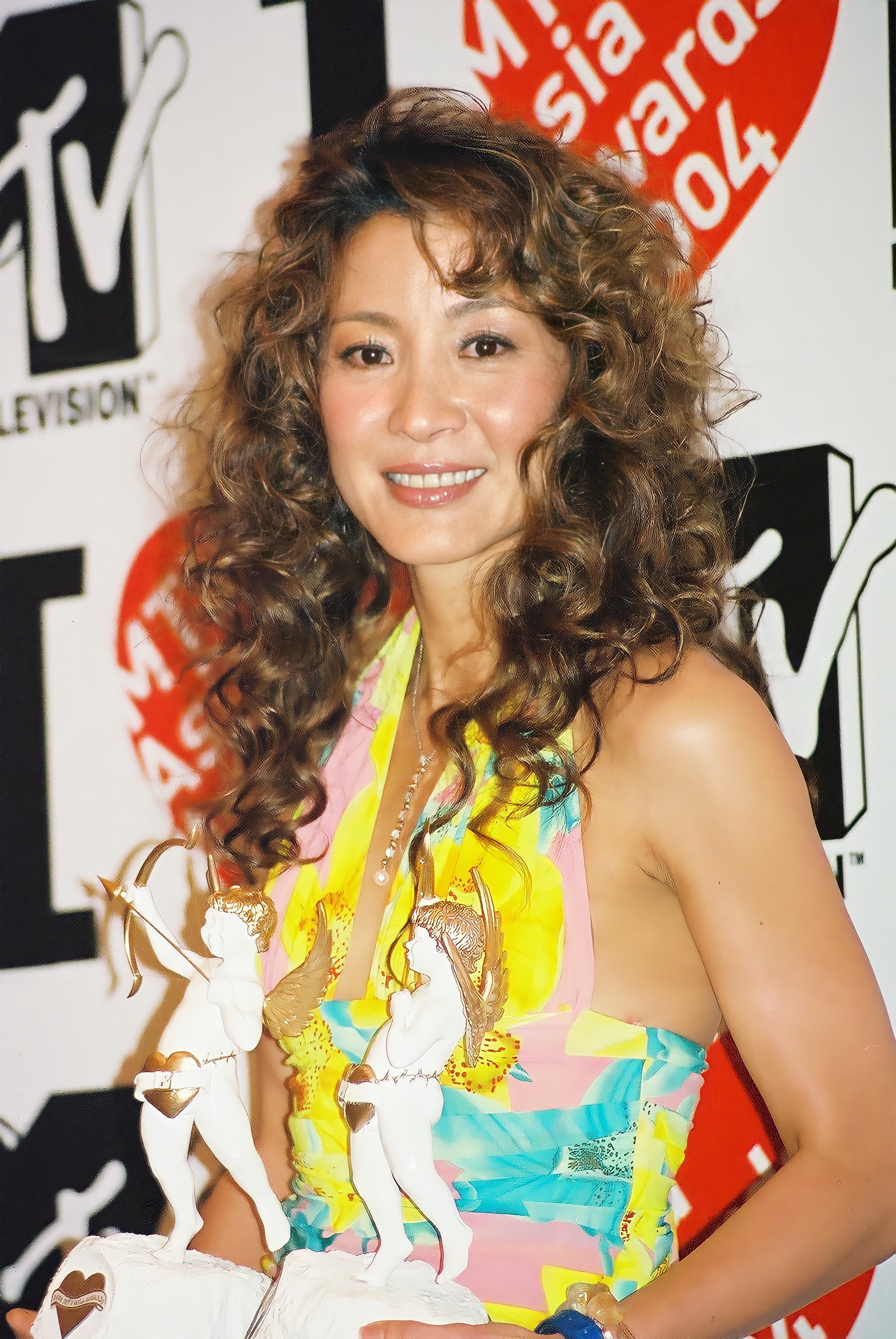
Yeoh at the 2004 MTV Asia Awards

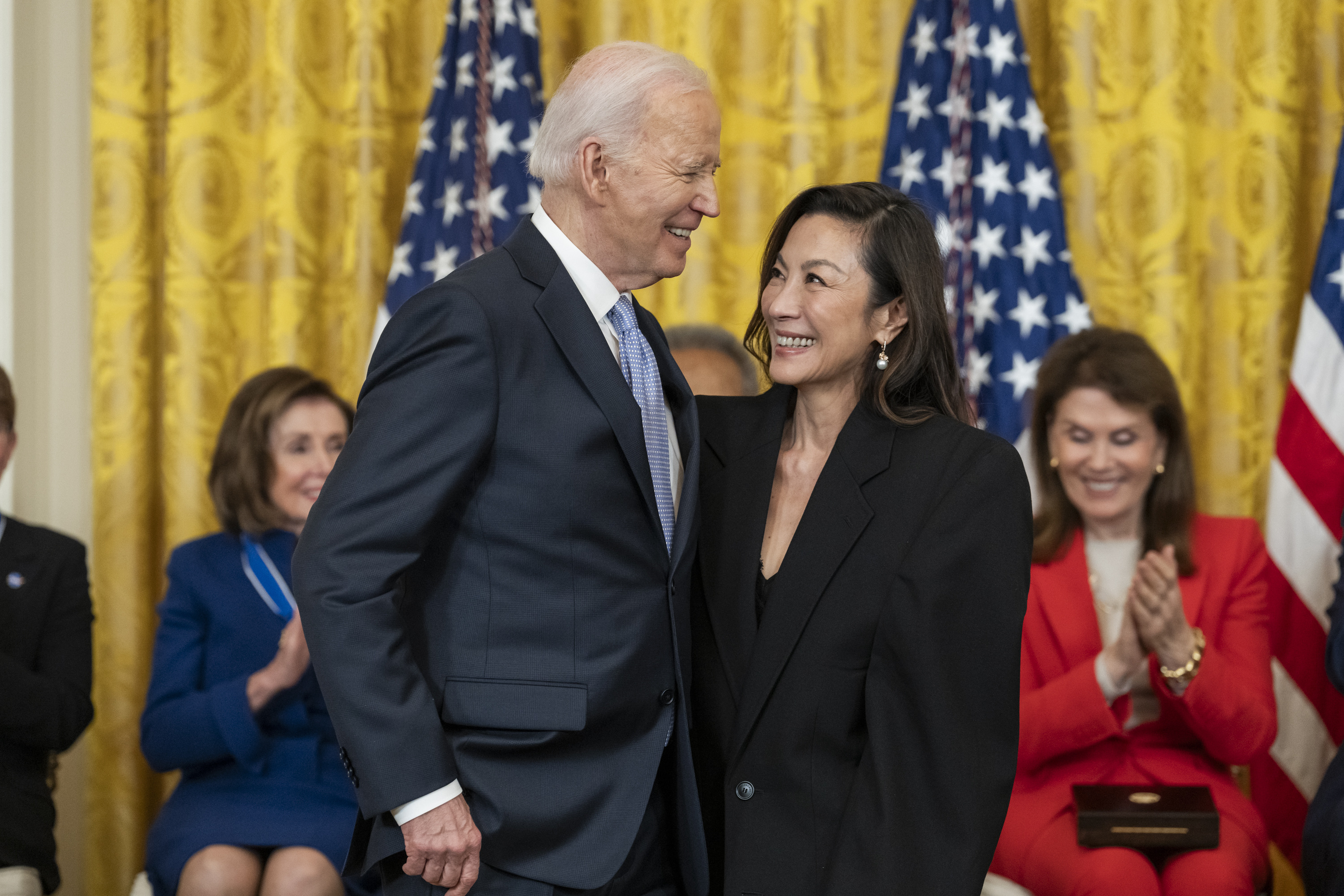
President Joe Biden presents the Presidential Medal of Freedom to Yeoh in 2024

=== Academic ===
Organization	Year	Honor	Ref.
American Film Institute	2022	Doctor of Fine Arts	
Hong Kong University of Science and Technology	2023	Honorary Doctoral Degrees	

=== Honors ===
Organization	Year	Honor	Ref.
amfAR	2015	Humanitarian Award	
ASEAN International Film Festival and Awards	2013	Lifetime Achievement Award	
Asia Society	2018	Artistic Visionary Award	
Asian American International Film Festival	1998	Asian American Media Award	
Asian Film Awards	2013	Excellence in Asian Cinema Award	
Atlantic Council	2024	Distinguished Leadership Awards	
Berlin International Film Festival	2026	Honorary Golden Bear	
Busan International Film Festival	2026	The Asian Filmmaker of the Year	
Cannes Film Festival	2009	Festival Trophy (Homage)	
Cannes Film Festival	2023	Women In Motion Award	
CineAsia	1999	Excellence in Acting for Outstanding Performance as an Actor	
Dorian Awards	2023	Wilde Artist of the Year	
East West Players	2022	Visionary Awards	
Family Film Awards	2021	Global Lifetime Achievement Award	
Federation of Hokkien Associations Malaysia	2008	Outstanding Award	
Gold House	2022	See Her Award	
Hollywood Chamber of Commerce	2026 (Note: Selected as part of the Hollywood Walk of Fame Class of 2024 in June 2023, with the official star induction ceremony held on February 18, 2026.)	Hollywood Walk of Fame	
Hollywood Film Awards	2018	Hollywood Breakout Ensemble Award (Note: Shared with the cast in Crazy Rich Asians.)	
Junior Chamber International	2002	Ten Outstanding Young Persons of the World – Cultural Achievement	
Junior Chamber International Malaysia	2002	Ten Outstanding Young Malaysians	
London Film Critics' Circle	2023	Dilys Powell Award	
Main Directorate for Traffic Safety	2009	Special Award	
Marrakech International Film Festival	2008	Tribute Award	
Maui Film Festival	2006	Rainmaker Award	
Mill Valley Film Festival	2011	Spotlight Award	
Montblanc Cultural Foundation	2002	Montblanc de la Culture Arts Patronage Award	
MTV Asia Awards	2004	Asian Film Award	
My Performing Arts Agency	2012	Lifetime Arts Achievement Award	
National Association of Theatre Owners	2001	ShoWest Convention – International Star of the Year Award	
Palm Springs International Film Festival	2023	International Star Award, Actress	
Safe Kids Worldwide	2016	Safe Kids Worldwide Safety Advocate Award	
Santa Barbara International Film Festival	2022	Kirk Douglas Award	
Silent River Film Festival	2013	River Glory Award	
Singapore International Film Festival	2015	Cinema Legend Award	
The Asian American Foundation	2023	Heritage Heroes Awards	
The Asian Awards	2019	Outstanding Achievement in Cinema	
Toronto International Film Festival	2022	TIFF Tribute Awards – Share Her Journey Groundbreaker Award	
United Nations Association of New York	2016	United Nations Day Humanitarian Awards	
World Economic Forum	2024	Crystal Award	
World Grandmaster Awards	2019	World Outstanding Film Star Master Excellence Award	
You Bring Charm to the World Award	2009	Chinese Influencing the World Award	

=== Listicles ===
Publisher	Listicle	Year	Result	Ref.
BBC	BBC 100 Women	2020	Placed	
British Vogue	14 of the Most Inspiring Female Leads on Film	2019	Placed	
Business Insider	25 Iconic Women Who Made Movie History	2025	Placed	
Den of Geek	The 25 Best Female Action Stars in Modern Cinema	2014	1st	
Elle	Elle's Women In Hollywood	2022	Placed	
Elle	The Most Empowering Oscars Speeches	2024	Placed	
Empire	50 Greatest Actors of All Time	2022	Placed	
Entertainment Weekly	Bond Girls: The Best and Worst (Note: For her role as Wai Lin in Tomorrow Never Dies.)	2008	Best	
Entertainment Weekly	Entertainer of the Year	2022	Placed	
Entertainment Weekly	The 30 Greatest Best Actress-winning Performances in Oscar History	2025	23rd	
Financial Times	The FT's 25 Most Influential Women of 2022	2022	Placed	
Forbes	50 Over 50: Asia	2022	Placed	
Fortune	Most Influential Women Asia	2025	Placed	
Gold House	A100 List	2022	Placed	
Gold House	A100 Hall of Fame	2023	Placed	
Gold House	A100 List	2025	Placed	
IGN	The Best Performance in a Movie in 2022	2022	Placed	
IndieWire	The 16 Best Film Performances by Actresses in 2018 (Note: For her role as Eleanor Sung-Young in Crazy Rich Asians)	2018	10th	
IndieWire	The Top 14 Female Action Stars Working Today	2017	6th	
IndieWire	The 28 Best Film and TV Performances of 2022	2022	Placed	
Los Angeles Times	The Best Movie Performances of 2022	2022	Placed	
National Geographic	National Geographic 33	2025	Placed	
Parade	The 21 Greatest Action Heroines in Movie History (Note: For her role as Yu Shu Lien in Crouching Tiger, Hidden Dragon.)	2023	7th	
People	The 50 Most Beautiful People in the World	1997	Placed	
People	The 35 All-Time Screen Beauties	2009	27th	
People	People's 2023 Women Changing The World	2023	1st	
Rolling Stone	Best Actress Oscar Winners of the 21st Century	2025	6th	
Rotten Tomatoes	The 25 Best Action Heroines of All Time	2008	1st	
ShortList	The 20 Greatest Martial Arts Stars of All Time	2026	14th	
Tatler Asia	Asia's Most Influential (Malaysia)	2021	Placed	
Tatler Asia	Asia's Most Influential (Malaysia)	2022	Placed	
Tatler Asia	Asia's Most Influential (Malaysia)	2023	Placed	
Tatler Asia	Asia's Most Influential (Malaysia)	2024	Placed	
Tatler Asia	Asia's Most Influential (Malaysia)	2025	Placed	
The A.V. Club	The 25 Most Memorable Film Performances of 2022	2022	Placed	
The Hollywood Reporter	Best Performances of the Year	2018	Placed	
The Hollywood Reporter	Women in Entertainment Power 100	2022	Placed	
The Hollywood Reporter	Women in Entertainment Power 100	2023	Placed	
The New York Times	The 10 Best Actors of the Year	2022	Placed	
The New Yorker	The Best Performances of 2022 (Note: For her role as Evelyn Wang in Everything Everywhere All at Once.)	2022	Placed	
The Ringer	The Best Performances of 2022	2022	Placed	
The Ringer	The 101 Best Movie Performances of the 21st Century	2025	55th	
Time	Time 100: The Most Influential People	2022	Placed	
Time	Icon of the Year	2022	Placed	
Time Out	The 5 Fiercest Female Action Stars Of All Time	2015	2nd	
Vanity Fair	The Best Performances of 2022	2022	Placed	
Variety	The 10 Most Unforgettable Bond Girls	2015	Placed	
Variety	Variety500 – Top 500 Entertainment Business Leaders	2022	Placed	
Variety	Variety500 – Top 500 Entertainment Business Leaders	2023	Placed	
Vogue	The 10 Most Powerful Bond Girls of All Time	2015	Placed	
W	The 11 Fiercest, Ass-Kicking, Gun-Toting Women in Action Films of All Time	2017	3rd	

=== Pageant ===
Organization	Year	Result	Ref.
Miss Moomba International	1984	Won	
Miss World	1983	18th place	
Miss World Malaysia	1983	Won	

=== State honors ===
Country	Year	Honor	Ref.
France	2007	Knight of the National Order of the Legion of Honor	
France	2012	Officer of the National Order of the Legion of Honor	
France	2016	Officier of the National Ordre des Arts et des Lettres	
France	2017	Commander of the National Order of the Legion of Honor	
Malaysia	2013	Commander of the Order of Loyalty to the Crown of Malaysia (P.S.M.)	
Perak	2001	Knight Commander of the Order of the Perak State Crown (D.P.M.P.)	
Perak	2012	Knight Grand Commander of the Order of the Perak State Crown (S.P.M.P.)	
United States	2024	Presidential Medal of Freedom	

=== World records ===
Publication	Year	World record	Record holder	R. Status	Ref.
Guinness World Records	2023	First Asian female to win the Best Actress Oscar	Michelle Yeoh	Record	

== See also ==
- List of Michelle Yeoh performances
- List of Golden Globe winners
- List of actors with Academy Award nominations
- List of Academy Award winners and nominees of Asian descent

== Bibliography ==
- Suryadinata, Leo (2012). Southeast Asian Personalities of Chinese Descent: A Biographical Dictionary. Vol. I. Singapore: Chinese Heritage Center, Institute of Southeast Asian Studies. ISBN 978-981-4345-22-4. LCCN 2012330755. OCLC 1112371683. S2CID 164801985. Project MUSE book 21437.
