= List of Michelle Yeoh performances =

Michelle Yeoh filmography
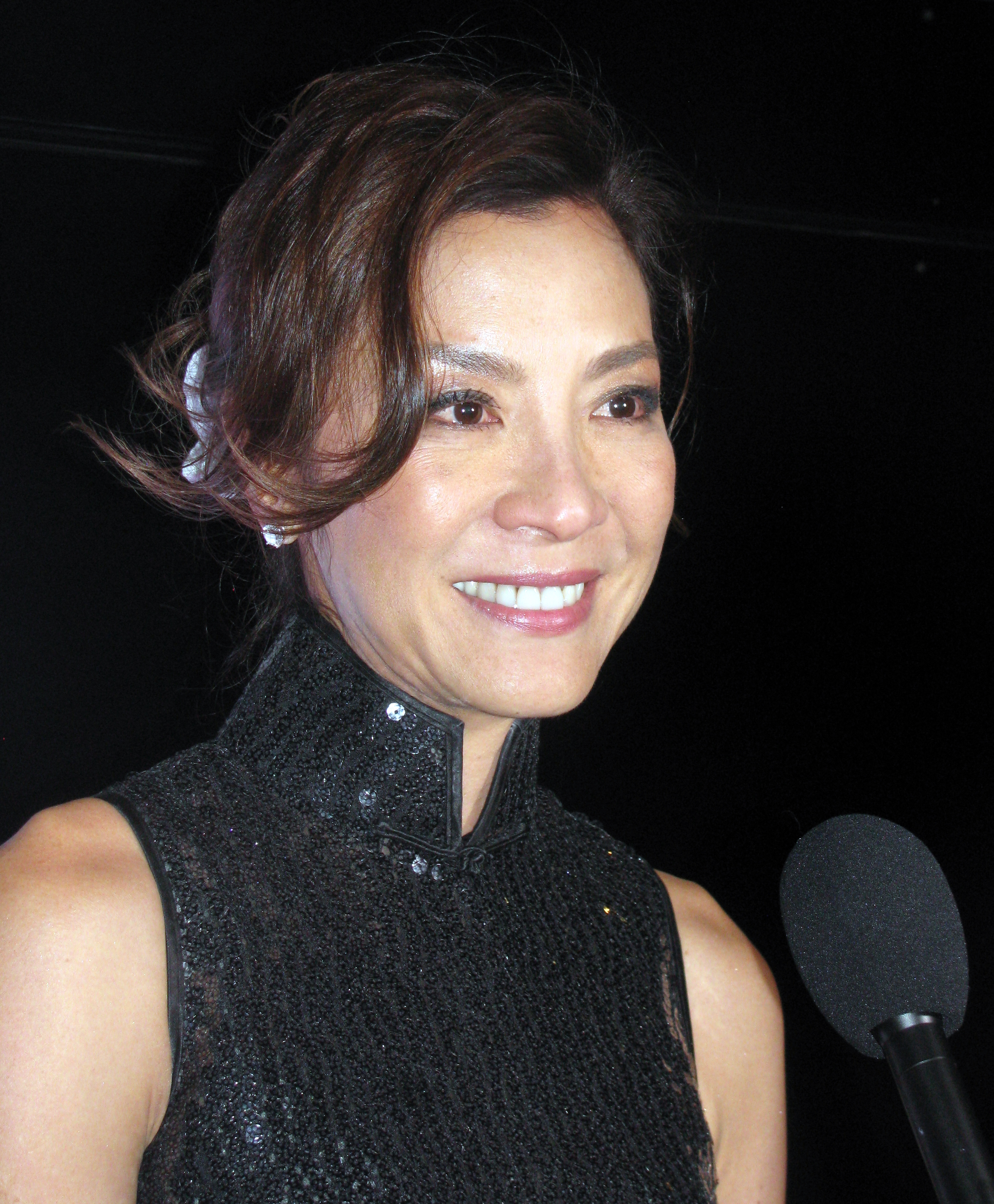
- Yeoh at the 2011 Toronto International Film Festival
- Film: 59
- Television: 8
- Documentary: 3
- Others: 2

Michelle Yeoh is a Malaysian actress. She rose to fame in 1990s Hong Kong action films, Yeoh began her film career acting in action and martial arts films such as Yes, Madam (1985), Police Story 3: Supercop (1992), The Heroic Trio (1993), Tai Chi Master (1993) and Wing Chun (1994) and she is well known as an action queen. Yeoh is known internationally for her roles as Wai Lin in the James Bond film Tomorrow Never Dies (1997), and as Yu Shu Lien in the martial arts film Crouching Tiger, Hidden Dragon (2000) and its sequel Crouching Tiger, Hidden Dragon: Sword of Destiny (2016).

Her other works include Memoirs of a Geisha (2005), Reign of Assassins (2010), The Lady (2011), in which she portrayed Aung San Suu Kyi, Master Z: Ip Man Legacy (2019), and Last Christmas (2019). Yeoh received critical acclaim for her performances as Eleanor Young in the American romantic comedy-drama Crazy Rich Asians and as Evelyn Quan Wang in the sci-fi comedy-drama Everything Everywhere All at Once, for which she won the Academy Award for Best Actress. From 2017 to 2020, Yeoh had a recurring role as Philippa Georgiou on the Paramount+ series Star Trek: Discovery, a role she reprised in the feature film Star Trek: Section 31.

== Filmography ==
Key
†	Denotes works that have not yet been released

=== Film ===
Year	Title	Role	Notes	Ref.
1984	The Owl vs Bombo	Miss Yeung		
1985	Twinkle, Twinkle, Lucky Stars	Judo instructor	Cameo	
1985	Yes, Madam	Inspector Ng		
1986	Royal Warriors	Inspector Michelle Yip		
1987	Magnificent Warriors	Fok Ming-ming		
1987	Easy Money	Michelle Yeung Ling (Ning)		
1992	Police Story 3: Supercop	Inspector "Jessica" Yang Chien-hua		
1993	The Heroic Trio	Ching / Invisible Woman / Number 3		
1993	Butterfly and Sword	Lady Ko		
1993	Executioners	Ching / San / Carol		
1993	Holy Weapon	Ching Sze / To Col Ching		
1993	Supercop 2	Inspector "Jessica" Yang Chien-hua		
1993	Tai Chi Master	Siu Lin / Qiu Xue ("Autumn Snow")		
1994	Shaolin Popey 2 – Messy Temple	Ah King		
1994	Wonder Seven	Fong Ying		
1994	Wing Chun	Yim Wing-chun		
1996	The Stunt Woman	Ah Kam		
1997	The Soong Sisters	Soong Ai-ling		
1997	Tomorrow Never Dies	Wai Lin	Hollywood debut film	
1999	Moonlight Express	Sis Michelle		
2000	Crouching Tiger, Hidden Dragon	Yu Shu Lien		
2002	The Touch	Pak Yin Fay	Also producer	
2004	Silver Hawk	Lulu Wong / The Silver Hawk	Also producer	
2005	Memoirs of a Geisha	Mameha		
2006	Fearless	Ms. Yang	Director's cut only	
2007	Sunshine	Corazon		
2007	Far North	Saiva		
2008	The Children of Huang Shi	Mrs. Wang		
2008	Babylon A.D.	Sister Rebeka		
2008	The Mummy: Tomb of the Dragon Emperor	Zi Yuan		
2010	True Legend	Sister Yu		
2010	Reign of Assassins	Zeng Jing / Drizzle		
2011	Kung Fu Panda 2	Soothsayer	Voice	
2011	The Lady	Aung San Suu Kyi		
2013	Final Recipe	Julia Lee	Also executive producer	
2016	Crouching Tiger, Hidden Dragon: Sword of Destiny	Yu Shu Lien		
2016	Mechanic: Resurrection	Mei		
2016	Morgan	Dr. Lui Cheng		
2017	Guardians of the Galaxy Vol. 2	Aleta Ogord	Cameo	
2018	Crazy Rich Asians	Eleanor Young		
2018	Master Z: Ip Man Legacy	Tso Ngan Kwan		
2019	Last Christmas	Santa / Huang Qing Shin		
2021	Boss Level	Dai Feng		
2021	Gunpowder Milkshake	Florence		
2021	Shang-Chi and the Legend of the Ten Rings	Ying Nan		
2022	Everything Everywhere All at Once	Evelyn Quan Wang	Also executive producer	
2022	Minions: The Rise of Gru	Master Chow	Voice	
2022	Paws of Fury: The Legend of Hank	Yuki	Voice	
2022	The School for Good and Evil	Professor Emma Anemone		
2023	Transformers: Rise of the Beasts	Airazor	Voice	
2023	A Haunting in Venice	Joyce Reynolds		
2024	The Tiger's Apprentice	Loo	Voice	
2024	Wicked	Madame Morrible	Also contributed to one song to the film's soundtrack	
2025	Ne Zha 2	Lady Yin	Voice; English dub	
2025	Wicked: For Good	Madame Morrible	Also contributed to two songs to the film's soundtrack	
2026	Sandiwara	The Critic / The Hawker / The Waitress / The Vlogger / The Singer	Short film	
2026	It's My Time	Zhao Yanhong	Also chief producer	
2026	The Surgeon†			
2027	The Wandering Earth 3 †			
2029	Avatar 4 †	Paktu'eylat	Filming	

=== Television ===
Year	Title	Role	Notes	Ref.
2015	Strike Back: Legacy	Mei Foster / Lieutenant Colonel Han Li Na	Recurring (9 episodes)	
2016	Marco Polo	Lotus	Season 2 (7 episodes)	
2017–2020	Star Trek: Discovery	Captain Philippa Georgiou / Emperor Philippa Georgiou (mirror)	Special recurring guest star (seasons 1-3; 24 episodes)	
2018	Star Trek: Short Treks	Lieutenant Philippa Georgiou	Episode: "The Brightest Star"	
2022	The Witcher: Blood Origin	Scían	4 episodes	
2023	American Born Chinese	Guanyin	Main	
2024	The Brothers Sun	Eileen Sun	Main	
2024–2025	Ark: The Animated Series	Mei-Yin Li	Voice; 5 episodes	
2025	Star Trek: Section 31	Emperor Philippa Georgiou	Television film; Also executive producer	
2026	Blade Runner 2099 †	Olwen	Post-production	

=== Documentary ===
Year	Film	Notes	Ref.
1998	Jackie Chan: My Story		
2008	Purple Mountain		
2012	Pad Yatra: A Green Odyssey	Executive producer	
2020	The Hidden Kingdoms of China	Narrator	

=== Video games ===
Year	Title	Role	Notes	Ref.
2003	Crouching Tiger, Hidden Dragon	Yu Shu Lien	Voice	
2008	The Mummy: Tomb of the Dragon Emperor	Zi Yuan	Voice	
2025	ARK: Survival Ascended	Mei-Yin Li	Voice	"Lost Colony" Expansion Pack

== Discography ==
Year	Title	Album	Ref.
2024	"The Wizard and I" (featuring Cynthia Erivo)	Wicked: The Soundtrack	
