= Institute of Health and Biomedical Innovation =

Former medical research institute

- The Institute of Health and Biomedical Innovation at night
- Executive Director: Professor Lyn Griffiths
- Faculty: Queensland University of Technology
- Budget: A$46 million (2015)
- Location: Kelvin Grove, Brisbane, Queensland, Australia
- Coordinates: 27°28′38″S 153°01′41″E
- Website: www.ihbi.qut.edu.au

The Institute of Health and Biomedical Innovation (IHBI) was an Australian collaborative medical research institute established in 2000 and based at the Queensland University of Technology (QUT) in Brisbane, Queensland. While the bulk of the institute was located at a purpose-built facility on the Kelvin Grove campus of QUT, a number of projects were conducted at sites across the two main QUT campuses (Gardens Point and Kelvin Grove) and at multi-partner research institutes adjoining major hospitals (the Translational Research Institute, adjoining the Princess Alexandra Hospital; and the Centre for Children's Health Research, adjoining the Queensland Children's Hospital). Research was also conducted at IHBI's Medical Engineering Research Facility (MERF), in the grounds of the Prince Charles Hospital.

The main facility was completed in June 2006 and forms part of the Kelvin Grove Urban Village. Initial funding for capital works and equipment procurement was received from the Queensland Government, QUT and The Atlantic Philanthropies, a private charitable organisation.

IHBI was disbanded in 2020, with the university deciding to move from an institute to a research centre model. QUT currently has a number of health-related research centres, including the Centre for Biomedical Technologies, Centre for Genomics and Personalised Health and Centre for Healthcare Transformation.

== Research focus ==
IHBI's research was divided into three cross-disciplinary research themes:

1. Health determinants and health systems, covering diabetes, mental health, disease prevention and health services research
2. Injury prevention and trauma management, including arthritis, orthopaedics, musculoskeletal care, tissue repair, biofabrication and road safety
3. Chronic disease and ageing, covering cancer, dementia, cardiovascular disease, vision impairment and infectious disease.

These themes incorporated a number of research projects: from basic science through to clinical and commercial applications of technology. The bulk of these projects were funded not by IHBI itself, but by a range of federal, state and private philanthropic grants awarded to individual teams of researchers.

The Centre for Accident Research and Road Safety - Queensland (CARRS-Q) was part of the Injury prevention and trauma management theme. The Australia China Centre for Tissue Engineering and Regenerative Medicine (ACCTERM) and the ARC Industrial Transformation Training Centre in Additive Biomanufacturing are also part of the Injury prevention and trauma management theme.

The Australian Prostate Cancer Research Centre - Queensland (APCRC-Q) was part of the Chronic disease and ageing theme, as part of its cancer research program.
