= Worker road safety =

Worker road safety refers to the economic, societal, and legal ramifications of protecting workers from automobile-related injury, disability, and death. Road traffic crashes are a leading cause of occupational fatalities throughout the world, especially in developing countries. In addition to the suffering of the workers and their families, businesses and society also bear direct and indirect costs. These include increased insurance premiums, the threat of litigation, loss of an employee, and destruction of property.

== Background ==
Road crashes worldwide kill over a million people every year and cost as much as 3% of global gross domestic product (GDP). Around the world, it is estimated that work-related incidents make up 25% the road toll (50% if commuting is included). Crash injuries disproportionately impact young people and those in developing countries. In addition to human suffering, traffic crashes can cost between 1 and 1.5 percent of a country’s GDP. For some economies, those losses exceed the amount received in development aid, according to Together for Safer Roads. Because rapid motorization generally accompanies economic development, a large percentage of occupational automobile crashes occur in low and middle-income countries. Workers in the developing world are becoming increasingly vulnerable to the risk of road traffic crashes. Workers at risk include drivers of commercial trucks and buses; workers who are not professional drivers, but who drive smaller trucks or passenger vehicles provided by their employer; workers who drive personal vehicles for work purposes; pedestrians, particularly roadside workers; and commuters.

== Institutional efforts ==
Efforts to protect workers on the road have been undertaken by international organizations such as the United Nations, World Health Organization, World Bank, and International Labour Organization. The WHO coordinates the United Nations Road Safety Collaboration, an effort drawing together government, business, and non-government organizations.

It is estimated that 25 percent of global crashes are work-related, rising to 50 percent if commuting is included. Companies have developed an environment that influences and supports the emergence of safer road users. In alignment with the United Nations Decade of Action for Road Safety’s Five Pillars, Together for Safer Roads developed a 14-step best practices report called Advancing Road Safety Best Practices for Companies and Their Fleets, to guide companies in developing and managing transportation programs.

Organizations such as the Global Road Safety Partnership (GRSP) and the Fleet Forum focus on safety in lower- and middle-income nations. They coordinate efforts among local and national governments and businesses. Organizations such as Driving for Better Business advocate change by outlining the business benefits of improved road safety for workers and employers. The Make Roads Safe campaign, funded by the UK's FIA Foundation, seeks to influence policies, budgets, and agendas at organizations such as the UN, World Bank, and G8, and to raise public and political awareness for global road safety.

=== Safe driving campaigns ===
Many of these organizations and governments strive to raise awareness for road safety through focused campaigns. The National Highways Driving for Better Business Programme offers a free Driving for Work Policy Builder and other resources to help Driver Managers and Employers reduce work related road risk. The Network of Employers for Traffic Safety (NETS), for example, is sponsoring a Drive Safely Work Week October 5-9, 2009, and offering a campaign tool kit to promote better driving. NETS is a partnership between the U.S. federal government and such corporations as Abbott, Amerifleet Transportation, Anheuser-Busch, Chubb Group of Insurance, General Motors Company, Johnson & Johnson, Liberty Mutual Insurance Group, Nationwide Mutual Insurance, Monsanto, and UPS.

== Intervention models ==
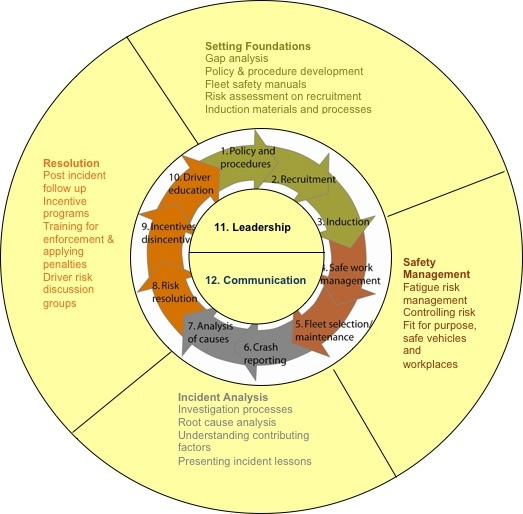
The Mooren model's 12-step process for road safety intervention.

=== Mooren model ===
Australian researcher Lori Mooren developed a 12-step process model with which organizations can perform gap analyses, establish benchmarks, host fleet safety improvement workshops, and develop fleet safety manuals and improvement programs. A number of businesses and government entities have reviewed their management practices against the model, including Johnson & Johnson, ALDI Stores, Toyota Australia, Reliance Petroleum, and TNT Malaysia.

=== WIPE model ===
Developed at the Centre for Accident Research and Road Safety – Queensland (CARRS-Q), the WIPE model seeks to identify the societal, business, legal, and financial reasons to focus on occupational road safety. The acronym WIPE stands for Why focus on fleet safety? Initial and continuing status review; Pilot, implement and change manage interventions; Evaluation. The WIPE model assumes that managers will write a business case focusing on the cost savings of protecting workers; perform a safety audit of their organization; launch a pilot program related to personnel training or vehicle improvements; and evaluate the outcomes of the pilot, demonstrating its impact.

Since the original research, the WIPE model, supported by the Haddon Matrix, has been successfully applied by many organisations around the world to help reduce collisions, cut costs and enhance brand value. Case studies, including British Telecom, Wolseley and Royal Mail and a free fleet review and benchmarking tool are provided at the Fleet Safety Benchmarking website (www.fleetsafetybenchmarking.net)

The model is also increasingly being used to support occupational road safety as a conduit or tool for general road safety, by engaging organisations to promote good practice to family members and in the wider communities in which they operate.

=== Stuckey-LaMontagne model ===
Australians Rwth Stuckey and A.D. LaMontagne advanced a similar systems-based approach. It focuses on the impact of occupational light vehicles (OLV) as a leading cause of traumatic deaths. Their model presents the worker as the locus of injury at the center of work- and road-related determinants of risk. The model sets occupational road safety in the wider policy and societal framework.

== See also ==
- Australian Transport Safety Bureau
- Automobile safety
- Canadian Centre for Occupational Health and Safety
- European Agency for Safety and Health at Work
- International Labour Organization
- Make Roads Safe
- National Institute for Occupational Safety and Health
- National Safety Council
- Road Administration (Sweden)
- Road traffic safety
- United Nations Road Safety Collaboration
- Work-related road safety in the United States
- World Bank
- World Health Organization
