= Turning Point (2009 American film) =

- Directed by: Richard Stanley
- Starring: Michelle Yeoh
- Theme music composer: Audio Network
- Original language: English

Production
- Producers: Matt Stanley; Richard Stanley; Saul Billingsley
- Cinematography: Nigel Meakin; Kerry Meyer
- Editor: Matt Stanley
- Running time: 48 minutes

Original release
- Release: May 2, 2009

Turning Point (alternative title "Dying To Go To School") is a 2009 documentary film by Richard Stanley Productions and the FIA Foundation for the Automobile and Society.

The documentary features Michelle Yeoh ("Global Ambassador for the Make Roads Safe campaign") while she "advocates for road injury to be recognised as a global public health and development priority".

The documentary follows her to South Africa, Malaysia, Vietnam and other countries.
