= Make Roads Safe =

Global road safety campaign

Make Roads Safe is a global road safety campaign established with the aim of securing political commitment for road traffic injury prevention around the world.

The Make Roads Safe campaign played a leading role in arguing for and securing the first-ever United Nations Ministerial Conference on global road safety, which was approved by the UN General Assembly on 31 March 2008 and was held in Moscow on 19 and 20 November 2009. The campaign also led the call for a UN Decade of Action for Road Safety to 2020, with the aim of reducing by half the predicted increase in global road deaths. On 2 March 2010 the UN General Assembly approved a resolution proclaiming a UN Decade of Action for Road Safety 2011-2020. The Decade of Action was officially launched on 11 May 2011.

The campaign was launched in June 2006 following the publication of the Make Roads Safe report by the Commission for Global Road Safety. The Commission, chaired by former NATO Secretary General Lord Robertson of Port Ellen, made recommendations for increasing funding levels for global road safety and argued that the international community was ignoring the scale of road deaths – which World Health Organization statistics show as ranking alongside Malaria and Tuberculosis in terms of global mortality.

The Make Roads Safe campaign is coordinated by the FIA Foundation, a road safety NGO, and includes a coalition of public health and road safety organisations as partners. The campaign aims to raise public awareness of the scale of the road injury problem and to present this as a key issue for sustainable development. The Make Roads Safe campaign argues that tackling road injuries is vital for achieving many of the Millennium Development Goals, including targets for child mortality and health and education targets, because of the vital role played by access to roads in delivering these services. The campaign claims that, although the G8 has approved $1.2 billion for new road infrastructure in Africa, only $20 million has been allocated for road safety measures. The campaign argues that at least 10% of this infrastructure budget, and the similar budgets deployed worldwide by the World Bank, regional development banks and other donors, should be dedicated to road safety measures. If this principle was accepted in the case of Africa it would mean $120 million would be available for road safety measures such as safety assessments of road design, enforcement and education strategies.

The Make Roads Safe campaign also calls for a $300 million, 10 year, Action Plan for road safety to build the capacity of developing countries to respond to their own road traffic injury problems.

== Make Roads Safe report ==
The Commission for Global Road Safety’s first report: Make Roads Safe – a new priority for sustainable development, published in June 2006, made a series of recommendations for improving the international response to global road traffic injuries. Building on the policy platform provided by the seminal 2004 publication from the World Health Organization and the World Bank, the World Report on road traffic injury prevention, the Make Roads Safe report focused on ways in which funding to road injury prevention could be increased. The main arguments of the report were that road traffic injuries were a major and growing public health epidemic, on the scale of Malaria and TB – according to WHO figures; that the cost to developing countries in human lives and economic loss (estimated at up to $100 billion a year by the World Bank) required urgent attention and that failing to address road safety in the context of development policies (particularly relating to road infrastructure investment) would impede progress towards achievement of the Millennium Development Goals.

The report set out three key recommendations aimed at increasing political commitment and investment in road safety:

- a $300 million Action Plan, over ten years, to equip developing countries with the sustainable tools to tackle their own road safety problems and to be able to access multilateral sources of funding for road safety;
- a requirement that a minimum 10% of all multilateral donor road infrastructure budgets should be allocated to road safety measures;
- a ministerial level UN summit to chart a course for international cooperation on road traffic injury prevention.

The Make Roads Safe report was endorsed by an Advisory Board including officials, acting in a personal capacity, from the World Bank, OECD, WHO, Asian Development Bank and United Nations Economic Commission for Europe. At the launch, in London, Lord Robertson summarised the findings of the report: ‘to Make Poverty History we must Make Roads Safe’.

A second report from the Commission for Global Road Safety, 'A Decade of Action for Road Safety', was published in May 2009, and made the case for the international community to approve a 'Decade of Action for Road Safety' between 2010 and 2020 to focus political commitment and resourcing on a sustained effort to improve road safety in developing countries. The report recognises that the majority of those killed or injured in road crashes in middle and low income countries are vulnerable road users, pedestrians, cyclists and motorcyclists, and calls for measures including better road planning and design to improve safety for vulnerable road users and reduce traffic speeds on shared road space, targets for helmet wearing and support for better policing.

== Supporters ==
More than a hundred and fifty organisations worldwide are supporting the Make Roads Safe campaign to date, including the World Health Organization, the United Nations Environment Programme, the Asia Injury Prevention Foundation, based in Vietnam; the Federation Internationale de l’Automobile (FIA), the governing body of world motor sport and the worldwide federation of automobile clubs; and the Global Road Safety Partnership (GRSP) a hosted programme of the International Federation of Red Cross and Red Crescent societies. Other organisations that have supported the campaign include BRAC, Oxfam, Safe Kids Worldwide, US injury NGO Amend.org, Fleet Forum and Bridgestone Corporation. In the UK supporters include the Royal Society for the Prevention of Accidents (RoSPA), ROADSAFE, Roadpeace, Living Streets (the Pedestrians Association), the RAC Foundation, the Parliamentary Advisory Committee on Transport Safety (PACTS), the Society of Motor Manufacturers and Traders (SMMT) and Transaid, a development NGO focusing on transport. In India, the Institute for Road Traffic Education (IRTE), a major Indian road safety NGO, and Indian automobile clubs are supporting the campaign. In South Africa both the AA of South Africa and road safety NGO Drive Alive are active supporters of the campaign. Road safety NGOs in Kenya, Ghana, Nigeria and Uganda have also been active in support of the campaign. The European Federation of Road Traffic Victims (FEVR)has also added its support. In the United States organisations endorsing the campaign include the Association for Safe International Travel (ASIRT), the American Public Health Association, the American Automobile Association (AAA), the National Organisation for Youth Safety (NOYS), Mothers Against Drink Driving (MADD) and the National Road Safety Foundation. National campaigns and activities in support of Make Roads Safe are being run in many countries by automobile clubs and road safety NGOs.

Political and public figures who have offered their support for the aims of the campaign include former NATO Secretary General Lord Robertson of Port Ellen, Archbishop Desmond Tutu, who launched the campaign in Africa at an event in Cape Town in May 2007, and former US Transportation Secretary, Norman Mineta. In September 2006 President Oscar Arias of Costa Rica endorsed a key aim of the campaign when he signed a Decree requiring at least 10% of road infrastructure investment in Costa Rica to be allocated to road safety. In an Op-Ed article for the Washington Post on 9 September 2006, President Arias called on regional development banks to follow this lead, and also urged support for the proposed $300 Global Road Safety Action Plan proposed in the Make Roads Safe report. In March 2008 Desmond Tutu was joined by Jimmy Carter, Sonia Gandhi, Mary Robinson, and President Arias in signing an open letter to the United Nations on behalf of the Make Roads Safe campaign, calling for urgent action to tackle global road deaths.

Asian film star Michelle Yeoh became a global ambassador for the campaign in 2008.

== Campaign progress ==
The campaign claimed success in achieving one of its key objectives in March 2008 with the passage of a strong United Nations resolution on global road safety at the UN General Assembly, including approval of the first-ever global Ministerial conference on road safety. To promote this objective, the Make Roads Safe campaign collected a million-strong petition which was personally delivered to UN Secretary General Ban Ki-moon by campaign chairman Lord Robertson on 31 March 2008.

The campaign has also claimed some success in persuading donors and the major multilateral lending institutions, such as the World Bank, to recognise their responsibilities for improving road safety. A conference on 'Safer Roads' held in London in July 2008 brought together all the major development banks, and leading donor countries, for the first time to discuss road safety as a component of road projects. This has led to the establishment of a working group of the development banks to agree a declaration ahead of the Moscow Conference.

The campaign's current stated objective is to secure support for a UN Decade of Action for Road Safety.

== Criticism ==
Some critics have argued that this initiative is car-centric, and does not focus on the problems inherent in the way road traffic is organised today. They say representatives for environmentally benign and healthy forms of transport are not represented in the board, nor has advice and knowledge about those modes of transport been heeded. The Make Roads Safe campaign has responded to this criticism by arguing that the main beneficiaries of a greater focus on road safety and safer infrastructure design will be vulnerable road users (including pedestrians and cyclists) who are the victims of the majority of road injuries in developing countries. Billions of dollars are being invested in new and upgraded road infrastructure in Africa, Asia and Latin America and the Make Roads Safe campaign argues that this development aid should be invested with the safety and mobility needs of all road users in mind.

== See also ==
- Global road safety for workers
- Road-traffic safety
- Turning Point (documentary)
