= Michelle Yeoh =

Malaysian actress (born 1962)

Yang Berbahagia Tan Sri Dato' Seri Michelle Yeoh PSM SPMP DPMP
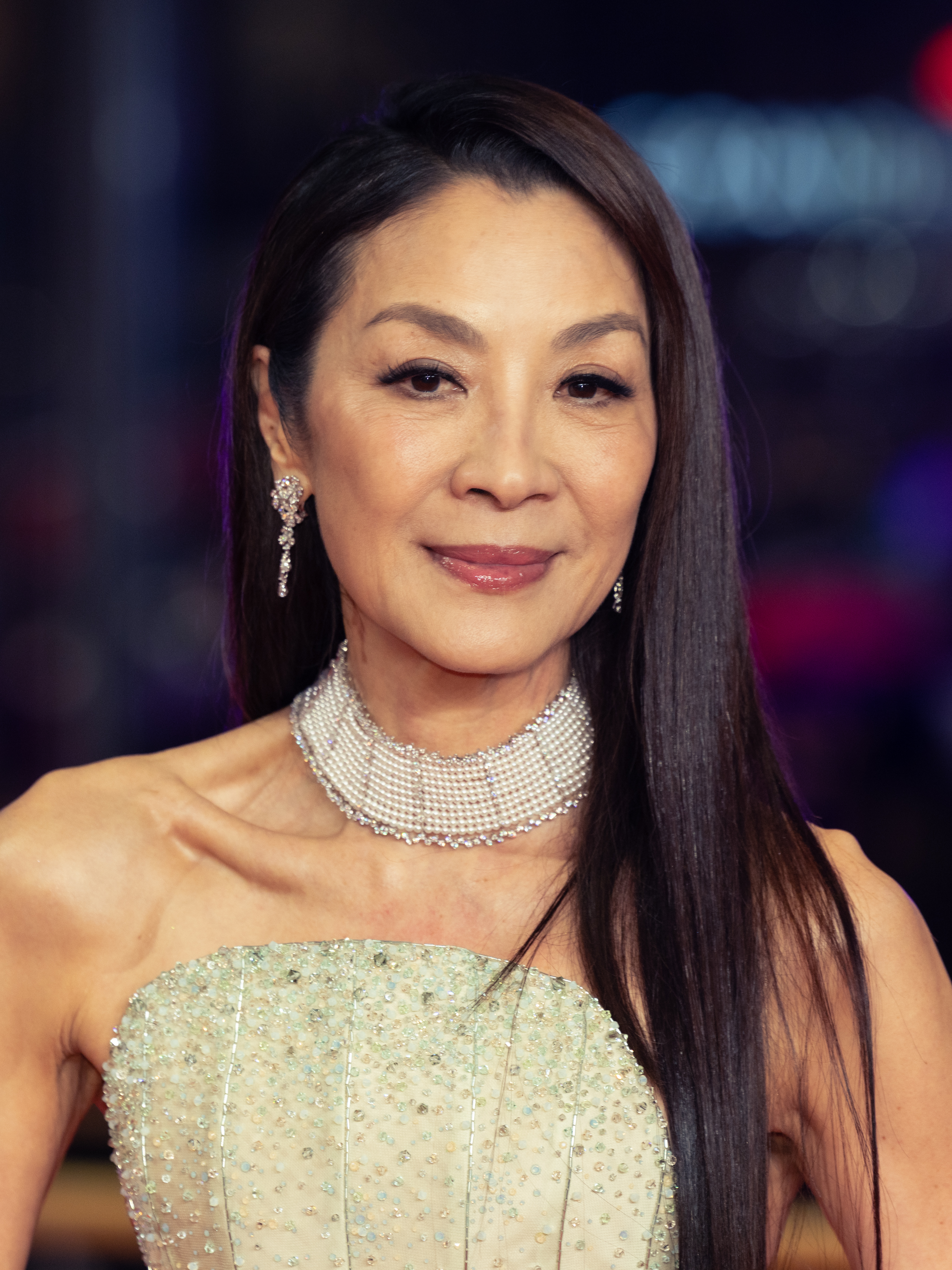
- Yeoh in 2026
- Born: Michelle Yeoh Choo Kheng; 6 August 1962 (age 64); Ipoh, Perak, Malaysia
- Other name: Michelle Khan
- Education: Royal Academy of Dance (BA)
- Occupation: Actress
- Years active: 1983–present
- Works: Full list
- Spouses: Dickson Poon (m. 1988; div. 1992) Jean Todt (m. 2023)
- Relatives: Nicolas Todt (stepson)
- Awards: Full list

Chinese name
- Traditional Chinese: 楊紫瓊
- Simplified Chinese: 杨紫琼
Transcriptions
Standard Mandarin
- Hanyu Pinyin: Yáng Zǐqióng
- IPA: [jáŋ tsɹ̩̀.tɕʰjʊ́ŋ]
Yue: Cantonese
- Jyutping: Joeng4 Zi2-king4 [jœŋ˩ tsi˧˥.kʰɪŋ˩]
Southern Min
- Tâi-lô: Iûnn Tsú-khîng [ĩũ tsu kʰiŋ]

Michelle Yeoh Choo Kheng (/joʊ/ YOH; Chinese: 楊紫瓊; 6 August 1962) is a Malaysian actress. In a career spanning over four decades, she has acted in film and television productions covering a wide range of genres and received various accolades, including an Academy Award and a Golden Globe Award, along with nominations for two British Academy Film Awards. Credited as Michelle Khan in her early films, she rose to fame in the 1980s and 1990s after starring in Hong Kong action and martial arts films where she performed her own stunts. These roles included Yes, Madam (1985), Magnificent Warriors (1987), Police Story 3: Supercop (1992), The Heroic Trio and Tai Chi Master (both 1993), and Wing Chun (1994).

After moving to the United States, Yeoh gained international recognition for her starring roles in the James Bond film Tomorrow Never Dies (1997) and in Ang Lee's wuxia martial arts film Crouching Tiger, Hidden Dragon (2000); the latter earned her a nomination for the BAFTA Award for Best Actress in a Leading Role. Her Hollywood career progressed with roles in Memoirs of a Geisha (2005), Sunshine (2007), and The Mummy: Tomb of the Dragon Emperor (2008). She continued to appear in Hong Kong and Chinese cinema, starring in True Legend and Reign of Assassins (both 2010); Crouching Tiger, Hidden Dragon: Sword of Destiny (2016); and Master Z: Ip Man Legacy (2018). In 2011, she portrayed Aung San Suu Kyi in the British biographical film The Lady (2011).

Yeoh played supporting roles in the romantic comedies Crazy Rich Asians (2018) and Last Christmas (2019), as well as in the Marvel Cinematic Universe film Shang-Chi and the Legend of the Ten Rings (2021) and the television series Star Trek: Discovery (2017–2020). Her voice acting work has included Kung Fu Panda 2 (2011); Minions: The Rise of Gru and Paws of Fury: The Legend of Hank (both 2022); Transformers: Rise of the Beasts (2023); and The Tiger's Apprentice (2024). For her starring role as Evelyn Quan Wang in Everything Everywhere All at Once (2022), she won the Academy Award for Best Actress, becoming the first Asian (Note: The term "Asian" is here used according to the race definition in the United States. While one Israeli actress and one actress of Armenian descent have won Best Actress, neither is considered Asian in this sense, which primarily includes East Asia, Southeast Asia, and South Asia.) to win the category. She has since featured in the mystery film A Haunting in Venice (2023), the musical fantasy films Wicked (2024) and Wicked: For Good (2025), and the sports drama film It's My Time (2026).

The film review aggregation website Rotten Tomatoes ranked her the greatest action heroine of all time in 2008. In 1997, she was chosen by People as one of the "50 Most Beautiful People in the World", and in 2009 the same magazine listed her as one of the "35 All-Time Screen Beauties." In 2022, Time named her one of the world's 100 most influential people on its annual listicle and its Icon of the Year. In 2024, she received the Presidential Medal of Freedom.

== Early life and education ==
Yeoh was born on 6 August 1962 in Ipoh, Perak, Malaysia, to Dato’ Yeoh Kian-teik (1925–2014), a politician, and Datin Janet Yeoh (born 1939). She has a brother, Robert Yeoh, an eye surgeon, two half-brothers, Lam Hoe, a medical professional, and Ronald Yeoh, an eye surgeon, and a paternal half-sister, Tan Chee Koon (born 1949). Her father was elected as a Senator of Malaysia from 1959 to 1969 as a member of Perak's Malaysian Chinese Association, the Chairman of the Perak Bar Association, and the founder of "Sri Maju" in 1975, a major intercity coach service in Malaysia and Singapore. Of Hokkien and Cantonese ancestry, she grew up speaking English to her father, and could understand some Malaysian Cantonese from her maternal grandmother who lived with them. She learned to speak Cantonese and Mandarin fluently in the 1980s and 1990s after starting her career in Hong Kong. Despite that, she never learned to read or write Chinese characters, which she has said was her greatest regret.

Yeoh was keen on dance from an early age, beginning ballet at age four. She went to the girls school Main Convent Ipoh. At age fifteen, she moved with her parents to England. There, she was enrolled in The Hammond School, Chester, where she started to train as a ballet dancer. However, a spinal injury prevented her from becoming a professional ballet dancer, and she shifted her attention to choreography and other arts. She received a Bachelor of Arts degree from Crewe + Alsager College of Higher Education in 1983.

== Career ==
=== 1980s: Early career and first retirement ===
In 1983, twenty-year-old Yeoh won the Miss Malaysia World beauty contest. She was Malaysia's representative at the Miss World 1983 pageant in London, where she placed eighteenth. Later that year, she traveled to Australia where she won the 1984 Miss Moomba International pageant. Her first acting work was in a television commercial for Guy Laroche watches with Jackie Chan. This caught the attention of a fledgling Hong Kong film production company, D&B Films. Although she had a passive understanding of the Ipoh Cantonese spoken in her hometown, she could not speak it. During a phone call in Cantonese, she was offered to co-star in a television commercial with a Sing Long, and only realized that was Chan's Cantonese name when she arrived in the studio. She learned to speak Cantonese as she began her career in Hong Kong.

Yeoh began her acting career in action and martial arts films, in which she performed her own stunts. Yeoh's first lead role came in her third film, Yes, Madam (1985). Yeoh initially used the pseudonym Michelle Khan, a stage name selected by D&B Films for its potential appeal to international and Western audiences. In 1987, Yeoh married her first husband Dickson Poon, a co-founder of D&B Films, and decided to retire from acting.

=== 1990s and 2000s: Breakthrough as an action star ===
After five years of marriage, Yeoh divorced Poon and returned to acting with Police Story 3: Supercop (1992). She appeared in The Heroic Trio (1993), and the Yuen Woo-ping films Tai Chi Master and Wing Chun in 1993 and 1994, respectively.

She changed her stage name back to Michelle Yeoh when she started her Hollywood career with Tomorrow Never Dies in 1997. In the 1997 James Bond film, she played Wai Lin opposite star Pierce Brosnan. Brosnan was impressed, describing her as a "wonderful actress" who was "serious and committed about her work." He referred to her as a "female James Bond" in reference to her combat abilities. Yeoh wanted to perform her own stunts but was prevented because director Roger Spottiswoode considered it too dangerous. Nevertheless, she performed all of her own fighting scenes.

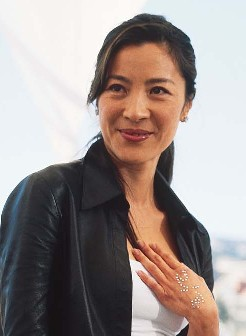
Yeoh at the 2000 Cannes Film Festival

In 1997, Yeoh played Soong Ai-ling in the award-winning The Soong Sisters. Yeoh was approached by director Ang Lee to star as Yu Shu Lien in her first Mandarin-language martial arts film Crouching Tiger, Hidden Dragon (2000). She did not speak Mandarin until the 2000s, and she had to learn the Mandarin lines for Crouching Tiger, Hidden Dragon phonetically. The film was an international success, and earned Yeoh a BAFTA 2000 nomination for Best Actress in a Leading Role.

In 2002, Yeoh produced her first English film, The Touch, through her own production company Mythical Films. In 2004, Yeoh met Jean Todt, a French motor racing executive, in Shanghai during a publicity event for Ferrari. They became engaged later that same year.

In 2005, Yeoh starred as Mameha in the film adaptation of Memoirs of a Geisha, and she continued her English-language work in 2007 with Sunshine. In 2008, Yeoh starred in the fantasy action film The Mummy: Tomb of the Dragon Emperor with Brendan Fraser and Jet Li.

=== 2010s: Fluctuations and supporting roles ===
In 2011, she portrayed Aung San Suu Kyi in Luc Besson's The Lady. Yeoh was blacklisted by the Burmese government allegedly because of her participation in The Lady; she was refused entry to Myanmar on 22 June 2011 and was deported on the same day. In October 2011, Yeoh was chosen by Guerlain to be its skincare ambassador. Yeoh's role was to help strengthen the French cosmetics company's relationship with Asia.

Yeoh did not branch out into television until 2015, with her first role playing Mei Foster, wife to the British Ambassador to Thailand, who is secretly a North Korean spy named Li-Na, on the fifth season of the Cinemax/Sky series Strike Back.

In 2016, Yeoh was cast as Starfleet Captain Philippa Georgiou of the starship USS Shenzhou in the series Star Trek: Discovery, and recurs as Georgiou's "mirror" doppelganger later in the series. Yeoh went on to play the role for three seasons, garnering critical acclaim and becoming a fan favourite. Following the success of Star Trek: Discovery, a spin-off series with Yeoh in the leading role, was commissioned in 2019. The series, which would centre on Yeoh's character, Emperor Georgiou working as a member of Section 31, a secret galactic spy organization, was still "in development" as of January 2023, but in April, Paramount+ announced it had ordered a Star Trek: Section 31 feature film starring Yeoh, rather than a series.

In 2018, Yeoh played family matriarch Eleanor Young in Jon M. Chu's Crazy Rich Asians, a film adaptation of Kevin Kwan's book of the same name, opposite Constance Wu and Henry Golding. Carlos Aguilar of TheWrap described her performance as "convincingly subdued". In 2019, she played Christmas themed-store owner "Santa" in Last Christmas, opposite Henry Golding and Emilia Clarke. The film was a box office success, grossing over $121 million worldwide.

Yeoh played Ying Nan in Marvel Studios' Shang-Chi and the Legend of the Ten Rings (2021), directed by Destin Daniel Cretton. It was announced at The Game Awards 2020 that Yeoh would star in Ark: The Animated Series, a series based on the video game Ark: Survival Evolved by Studio Wildcard, in which she plays the role of Meiyin Li, a 3rd-century Chinese rebel leader, known as the Beast Queen.

=== 2020s: Critical resurgence ===
Yeoh starred in the science fiction surreal comedy film Everything Everywhere All at Once from filmmaking duo Daniels, released in March 2022 to widespread critical acclaim. In the film, she played struggling laundromat owner Evelyn Quan Wang, a role that was widely praised by critics, with David Ehrlich of IndieWire claiming it the "greatest performance that Michelle Yeoh has ever given". It was for this role that Yeoh earned her first Golden Globe win (becoming the first Malaysian actor to win Best Performance by an Actress in a Motion Picture – Musical or Comedy at the Golden Globes), her first Independent Spirit nomination and win, her first Oscar nomination and win, her second BAFTA nomination, and her first Critics' Choice Awards nomination. Additionally, she became the first Asian woman to win any individual lead film category in the Screen Actors Guild Awards, winning the Screen Actors Guild Award for Outstanding Performance by a Female Actor in a Leading Role. She also became the first Malaysian to be nominated for and win an Academy Award, as well as the first Asian and second woman of colour to win the Academy Award for Best Actress.

Yeoh appeared in the Disney+ series American Born Chinese, based on the book of the same name by Gene Luen Yang. She starred as a psychic medium alongside Kenneth Branagh in A Haunting in Venice, released in 2023. In the same year, Yeoh became an International Olympic Committee member, and delivered a speech at Harvard Law School's 2023 class day.

In January 2024, she led the eight-part action comedy series The Brothers Sun for Netflix, which received generally positive reviews. She has since starred as Madame Morrible in the two-part film adaptation of the musical Wicked directed by Jon M. Chu, with the first film released in November 2024, and the second film released the following year. In 2025, Yeoh joined the English-language cast of the Chinese animated blockbuster Ne Zha 2, voicing a lead character in the version released by A24 and CMC Pictures. In 2026, Yeoh starred in and served as chief producer for the sports drama It's My Time, marking her first Chinese film project since the Academy.

In May 2024, Yeoh was cast in a lead role as a replicant alongside Hunter Schafer in the Amazon science-fiction television series Blade Runner 2099. She will also star as human scientist Dr. Karina Mogue in Avatar 4, set to release on 21 December 2029 and Avatar 5, set to release on 19 December 2031. In February 2026, The Berlin International Film Festival awarded the 2026 Honorary Golden Bear to Yeoh in recognition of her outstanding achievements in film and cinema. In October 2026, Yeoh was honored with The Asian Filmmaker of the Year award at the 31st Busan International Film Festival.

== Activism ==
Yeoh speaking about gender inequality at the 2024 World Economic Forum

Yeoh devotes a large part of her time to charitable and social endeavours, including disaster relief, HIV/AIDS, poverty reduction, animal conservation, gender equality and road safety. She has been an ambassador and leading campaigner for FIA's Make Roads Safe campaign to be recognised as a global public health and development priority since 2008. Among many activities on behalf of the campaign, she promoted safer road design at the events around the world, spoke at the United Nations General Assembly, Asia Development Bank, World Bank, walked to promote traffic safety at the Formula One race, and launched the Call for a Decade of Action for Road Safety at an event in Vietnam organised by the Asia Injury Prevention Foundation. She also filmed a documentary on global road safety, Turning Point, a version of which was shown on BBC World News.

Yeoh has donated her time as a WildAid ambassador for endangered animals and is a goodwill ambassador for the United Nations Development Programme (UNDP) for the Sustainable Development Goals initiative since 2016. Yeoh is a patron of the Save China's Tigers project committed to protecting the endangered South China tiger. She also joined UNDP's first-ever animal ambassadors, two panda cubs, to kick off the Pandas for the Global Goals campaign. In order to raise awareness about wildlife conservation and climate change, she collaborated with National Geographic to produce the documentary Among the Great Apes with Michelle Yeoh, while emphasising the importance of responsible consumerism, sustainable fashion, and ethical business practices. In 2013, she changed to the role of executive producer for the project Pad Yatra: A Green Odyssey. The film recorded a journey of 700 people, led by the 12th Gyalwang Drukpa, to the perilous Himalayan mountain range. They traveled 450 miles, planted 50,000 trees, and educated the villagers on environmental responsibility.

Yeoh's activism extends to health and well-being issues, ranging from patrons to ambassadors, through organisations including AIDS Concern, Hong Kong Cancer Fund, amfAR, Live To Love, and Paris Brain Institute. She also joined UNAIDS's commissioner team, and serves on the board of directors of the Suu Foundation, a non-political charity established to support the health, education, human rights, and development of the people of Myanmar. As one of the survivors of the 2015 Nepal earthquake, after evacuation, she returned to the disaster-hit country to help rehabilitate affected people and donate €100,000 for victims.

Throughout her career, Yeoh has always portrayed strong roles and been defiant in working against stereotypes. After Tomorrow Never Dies, she did not work for nearly two years due to the stereotypical roles offered to her in America. She told People: "At that point (1990s), people in the industry couldn't really tell the difference between whether I was Chinese, Japanese, Korean or if I even spoke English. They would talk very loudly and very slowly". She has long spoken out about racism in Hollywood, typically in her awards acceptance speech at the Golden Globes. The day after her Oscar win, she published an opinion essay in The New York Times calling for true gender equality.

== Personal life ==
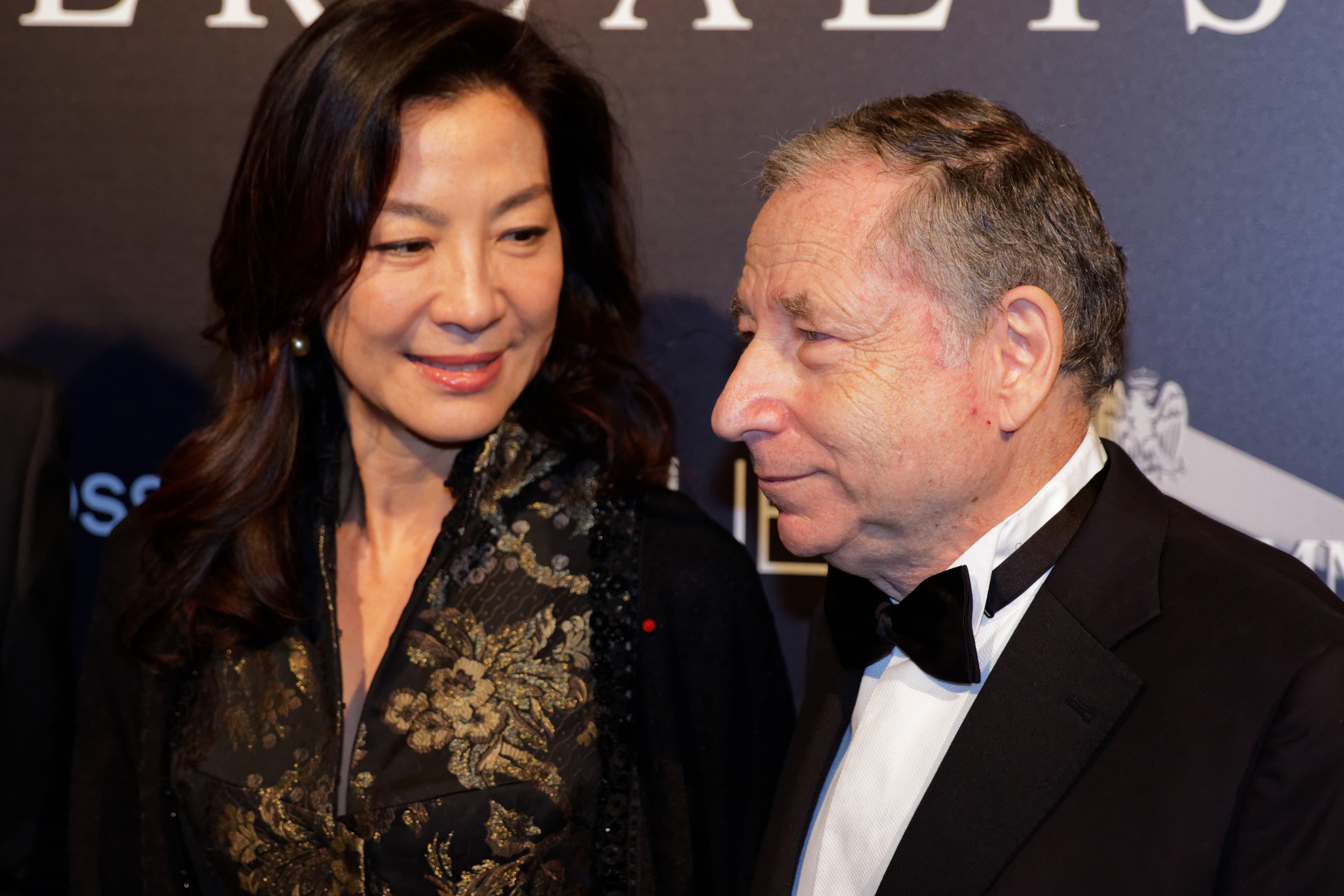
Michelle Yeoh and her husband Jean Todt at the Festival Automobile International 2016

Yeoh was married to Hong Kong entrepreneur Dickson Poon, known for his ownership of businesses such as Harvey Nichols and Charles Jourdan, from 1988 to 1992. From 1998 to 2000, Yeoh dated and was eventually engaged to Alan Heldman, an American cardiologist.

In 2004, she began dating Jean Todt, then the general manager and CEO of Scuderia Ferrari and later the president of the FIA. They became engaged on 26 July 2004. As of 2019, she lives in Geneva, Switzerland, with Todt. In an Instagram post, former Scuderia Ferrari driver Felipe Massa said that Yeoh and Todt were married on 27 July 2023 in Geneva.

Yeoh does not have any children, and has cited her inability to have children as the reason for ending her first marriage.

Yeoh is Buddhist and an activist. Yeoh expressed her support for Malaysian prime minister Najib Razak and the political coalition Barisan Nasional ahead of the 2013 Malaysian general election. In 2022, she told Vanity Fair that Shakespeare and Stephen King were her favourite authors and that Tarzan was her favourite fictional hero.

== Accolades ==
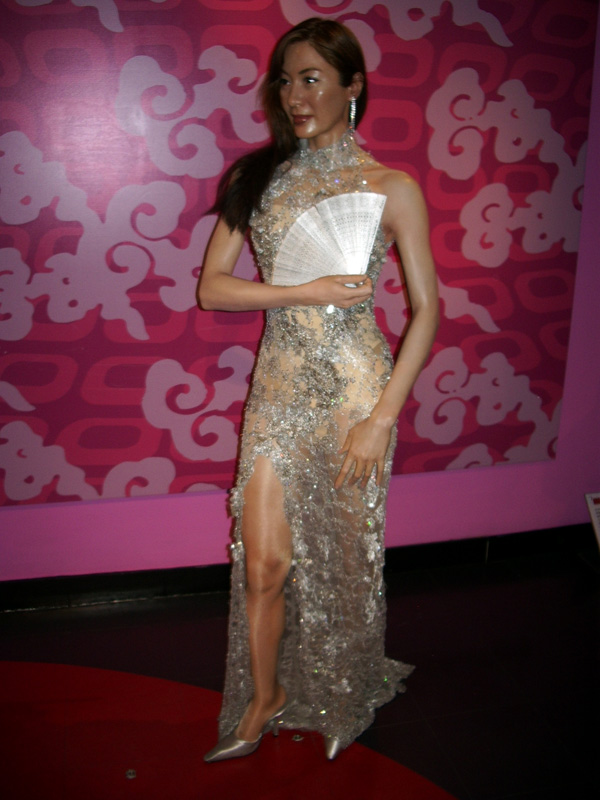
Yeoh's wax figure at Madame Tussauds Hong Kong

Yeoh is widely regarded as one of the greatest female action stars in cinema history. Christina Newland of BBC Online credited her early work in Hong Kong action films with helping "redress the male-dominated nature of that cinema scene", and Pete Volk of Polygon said she had already established herself as "one of the best action stars in the world" before breaking through in the United States. She has been compared to Jackie Chan throughout her career, and has often been nicknamed the "female Jackie Chan" by the press.

In 1999, she was a member of the jury at the 49th Berlin International Film Festival. On 19 April 2001, Yeoh was awarded the Darjah Datuk Paduka Mahkota Perak (DPMP), which carries the title Dato', by Sultan Azlan Shah, the Sultan of Perak, her home state, in recognition of the fame she brought to the state. On 25 November 2002, Yeoh was honoured as The Outstanding Young People of the World (TOYP) (Cultural Achievement) by JCI (Junior Chamber International). On 23 April 2007, French President Jacques Chirac conferred upon Yeoh the title of Knight of the Legion of Honour (French: Chevalier de la Légion d'honneur). The decoration was presented to her in a ceremony in Kuala Lumpur on 3 October 2007. She was promoted to Officer of the same French order (Officier de la Légion d'honneur) by French President Nicolas Sarkozy on 14 March 2012 at a ceremony held at the president's residence, the Élysée Palace, on that day, and promoted to Commander (Commandeur), the highest honour available to non-French citizens, by François Hollande at the official residence of the French ambassador in Kuala Lumpur on 27 March 2017.

On 22 May 2012, Yeoh was awarded the Darjah Seri Paduka Mahkota Perak (SPMP) which carries the title Dato' Seri during the investiture ceremony in conjunction with the Sultan of Perak Sultan Azlan Shah's birthday. Yeoh received the Excellence in Asian Cinema award during the 7th Asian Film Awards in March 2013 in Hong Kong. On 1 June 2013, Yeoh was awarded the Panglima Setia Mahkota (PSM) which carries the title Tan Sri during the investiture ceremony in conjunction with the birthday of Yang di-Pertuan Agong Tuanku Abdul Halim Mu'adzam Shah. On 30 November 2013, Yeoh presided as the Chief Guest at the International Film Festival of India.

On 12 February 2016, Yeoh was made an Officier of the Ordre des Arts et des Lettres by the French ambassador to Kuala Lumpur, becoming the first Malaysian citizen to receive that honour. Yeoh was included in the BBC's 100 Women list of 2020. She was placed on Time magazine's list of the 100 most influential people in the world in 2022. On 13 August 2022, Yeoh received an honorary doctorate of fine arts degree from the American Film Institute for her contributions of distinction to the art of the moving image. She became the first Asian artist to receive the honour. On 9 December 2022, Yeoh received the Kirk Douglas Award from the Santa Barbara International Film Festival.

On 9 January 2024, Yeoh was awarded the Crystal Award by the World Economic Forum for her role as a cultural leader and for her contributions to society as an exceptional artist. On 3 May 2024, the United States government announced Yeoh would receive the Presidential Medal of Freedom, the nation's highest civilian honour. Yeoh was cited for continuing "to shatter stereotypes and enrich American culture." On 18 February 2026, she became the first Malaysian to receive a star on the Hollywood Walk of Fame in Los Angeles.

=== Honours ===
==== Honours of Malaysia ====
- Malaysia
  - Commander of the Order of Loyalty to the Crown of Malaysia (PSM) – Tan Sri (2013)
- Perak
  - Commander of the Order of the Perak State Crown (DPMP) – Dato' (2001)
  - Grand Commander of the Order of the Perak State Crown (SPMP) – Dato' Seri (2012)

==== Foreign honours ====
- France
  - Knight of the National Order of the Legion of Honour (2007)
  - Officer of the National Order of the Legion of Honour (2012)
  - Officier of the National Ordre des Arts et des Lettres (2016)
  - Commander of the National Order of the Legion of Honour (2017)
- United States
  - Presidential Medal of Freedom (2024)

== See also ==
- List of Academy Award winners and nominees of Asian descent
- List of actors with Academy Award nominations
- List of actors nominated for Academy Awards for non-English performances
- List of superlative Academy Award winners and nominees
- List of Academy Award records
- List of Golden Globe winners
