= Silver Hawk =

2004 Hong Kong-Chinese film by Jingle Ma

- Film poster
- Traditional Chinese: 飛鷹
- Simplified Chinese: 飞鹰
- Hanyu Pinyin: Fēi Yīng
- Jyutping: Fei1 Jing1
- Directed by: Jingle Ma
- Written by: Jingle Ma; Susan Chan
- Produced by: Thomas Chung; Michelle Yeoh; Ko Fung-chun
- Starring: Michelle Yeoh; Richie Jen; Luke Goss; Brandon Chang; Michael Jai White
- Cinematography: Jingle Ma; Chan Chi-ying
- Edited by: Kwong Chi-leung
- Music by: Peter Kam
- Production companies: Han Entertainment; Tianjin Film Studio; China Film Co-Production Corporation; Mythical Films; Media Asia Films
- Distributed by: Media Asia Distributions
- Release date: 15 January 2004
- Running time: 99 minutes
- Countries: Hong Kong; China
- Languages: Cantonese; Mandarin; English
- Box office: HK$3,391,280

Silver Hawk (Chinese: 飞鹰) is a 2004 superhero film directed by Jingle Ma and starring Michelle Yeoh, Richie Jen, Luke Goss, Brandon Chang and Michael White. Yeoh plays the title character, a masked comic book style heroine who rides a motorcycle, saves kidnapped pandas and uses her martial arts moves on the bad guys. The masked heroine theme dates back to Huang Ying, a 1948 Shanghai book by Xiao Ping. A Hong Kong-Chinese co-production, the film was originally called The Masked Crusader in English, but the title was changed because the war in Iraq had charged "crusader" with negative meaning.

== Plot ==
Silver Hawk, whose secret identity is Lulu Wong, is the masked protector of China's Polaris City. (Note: This world's equivalent to Hong Kong.) Rich Man, an old childhood friend of Lulu's, becomes the head of the police department. He tries to arrest Silver Hawk, to no avail.

Lulu eventually attends a demonstration by scientist Ho Chung. Ho shows off his latest invention, an A.I. chip that would tap into information about the user to suggest ways for the latter to improve their life. In a demonstration, the chip imprisons a volunteer and activates a hamster-wheel type structure to compel her to exercise. Ho is later kidnapped by crooks Morris and Jane, with the police and Silver Hawk soon giving chase. The chase ends when she chooses to save a woman's life instead of following the crooks.

Ho is brought before Alexander Wolfe. Alexander wants the chip to take over people's minds and coerces Ho into helping him.

Man's investigation takes him to Zenda City, (Note: This world's equivalent to Tokyo.) where Lulu's uncle Shiraishi, a powerful CEO who expressed interest in the chip, is headquartered. Morris and Jane try to kidnap Shiraishi's daughter Tina, but Lulu (not in costume) intervenes. The crooks' boss is Wolfe, who deduces that Silver Hawk and Lulu are the same person by comparing fighting styles. The crooks escape with Tina, and Man brings Lulu to the local police station and asks her about her kung fu skills. Outside the station, they see Shiraishi driving away. They follow Shiraishi until Wolfe whisks him away in a helicopter.

Wolfe wants Shiraishi to put Ho's chip in a new phone and distribute them in exchange for Tina. Later, he forces Ho to speed up his preparation of the subliminal messages that phones will transmit, despite possible long-term damage to the user's mind. Ho slips a secret message into the phone's computer code.

Days later, Shiraishi is promoting the new phone. When Lulu approaches him about Tina, he tells his staff to get rid of her. At her apartment, Lulu finds flowers and a message from Wolfe to meet him about Tina. Lulu then finds Man, who has guessed who Silver Hawk is, waiting outside to talk to her. She tells him to wait in the hotel bar. Before leaving, he secretly slips a tracking into Lulu's hair and follows her. As Silver Hawk, Lulu meets Wolfe, who orders four men to attack her. She fends them off before Wolfe uses his bionic arms to hit her. Heavily injured, Silver Hawk escapes. Man tracks her to where she has passed out from the pain. He takes her to his apartment where she wakes up. Their talk is interrupted by a newsflash about Shiraishi's support of Wolfe to run for premier. Shiraishi is using a new phone, and his face looks unnatural.

The next day, Kit discovers Ho's secret message. It reveals that Wolfe plans to activate the mind control in a few hours, but they do not know where to find him until Silver Hawk deduces the address. There, the police battle Wolfe's thugs. Silver Hawk arrives and helps put them away. Kit finds a way to Wolfe's lair and they rouse Ho to help them deactivate the mind control signal while Silver Hawk and Man subdue Wolfe's men. Wolfe's retinal scan is needed to stop the upload, so Kit tricks him into opening his eyes as Man and Silver Hawk hold in him front of the scanner. This works but also activates the base's self-destruct system. Man and the others escape, but Silver Hawk stays behind to help Wolfe escape. However, Wolfe attacks her, and a battle ensues before he is crushed by the building. Aided by her bike's missiles, Silver Hawk escapes.

In Polaris City, Lulu has a date with Man. He is called away on official business, leaving the question of whether he would arrest Lulu unanswered. Silver Hawk later leaves on her motorcycle, en route to the same crime. Man eventually drives up next to her, and the two tease each other about their signature moves.

== Cast ==
- Michelle Yeoh as Lulu Wong / The Silver Hawk
- Richie Jen as Rich Man
- Luke Goss as Alexander Wolfe
- Brandon Chang as Kit
- Li Bingbing as Jane
- Michael Jai White as Morris
