= The Touch (2002 film) =

2002 film

- Traditional Chinese: 天脈傳奇
- Simplified Chinese: 天脉传奇
- Literal meaning: The Legend of the Heavenly Pulse
- Hanyu Pinyin: Tiān Mài Chuánqí
- Jyutping: tin1 mak6 cyun4 kei4
- Directed by: Peter Pau
- Written by: Julien Carbon; Laurent Courtiaud
- Produced by: Thomas Chung; Michelle Yeoh
- Starring: Michelle Yeoh; Ben Chaplin; Richard Roxburgh
- Cinematography: Peter Pau
- Edited by: Marshall Harvey
- Music by: Basil Poledouris
- Distributed by: Gala Film Distribution
- Release date: 1 August 2002
- Running time: 103 minutes
- Countries: Hong Kong; China; Taiwan
- Languages: English; Mandarin
- Budget: $18.6–20 million
- Box office: $2.262.168 (International)

The Touch (Chinese: 天脈傳奇) is a 2002 martial arts film directed by Peter Pau and starring Michelle Yeoh, Ben Chaplin and Richard Roxburgh. A Hong Kong-Chinese-Taiwanese co-production, the film was created by China Film Co-production Corporation, Han Entertainment, Mythical Films, Aruze, Pandasia Entertainment and Tianjan Studios. The film also features the final score composed by Basil Poledouris before his death in 2006.

Apart from special effects sequences shot in sound stages, the film was shot on-location in Tibet, Nepal and China. Some of the mountain ranges in which the film was shot were not open to filmmakers earlier.

More than two years before its release, it was reported that Lee Chi-Ngai had been chosen to direct the film, starring Michelle Yeoh and produced by Media Asia Group managing director Thomas Chung. Miramax also bought the rights to the film in 2001, removing 20 minutes of footage for a 83-minute version and completed the special effects CGI scenes. Miramax eventually premiered the film on United States TV channel in 2006.

The film's producers and distribution company M6 in France encountered conflicts over casting and the cost of the rights. It had been passed uncut by the China's national censor, and had a 2005 theatrical release in Japan by Nikkatsu. Beside, it released from 2003 to 2005 in various European countries, including Spain and Greece. In 2023, The Touch is available for streaming in the United States on Amazon Prime Video and Apple TV app.

The film was chosen as the Hong Kong entry for Best Foreign Language Film at the 75th Academy Awards but was disqualified for being ineligible, due to the film's language being mainly in English.

== Plot ==
The Touch tells the story of a Chinese family of martial artists and acrobats who have been performing for many generations. The family are, in secret, guardians of a holy treasure accessible only by a spectacular jump which, to everyone else, is impossible to perform.

One of the family members (the main character's brother) and his girlfriend are kidnapped by a ruthless treasure hunter (Roxburgh) to procure the priceless relic for him. Yeoh's character Pak Yin, with the help of Eric (Chaplin), her master thief ex-boyfriend, pursues them into an ancient desert where legends say the treasure is buried in order to uncover and protect the treasure that her ancestors had sworn to keep safe. The action culminates in a climactic sequence set in the booby trapped subterranean Buddhist temple.

== Cast ==
- Michelle Yeoh
- Ben Chaplin
- Dane Cook
- Richard Roxburgh
- Kenneth Tsang

== Reception ==
The film was generally panned by critics for its clichéd storyline, overuse of English than Chinese and the sub-par visual effects in the original theatrical release. Andrew Saroch of Far East Film Festival gave the film 2.5/5 stars and wrote: "The fact that ‘Magnificent Warriors’ – Yeoh’s much more successful action-adventure outing – was made for a fraction of ‘The Touch’s budget says everything about Pau’s finished article." In his review for Screen International, Paul Fonoroff described the film as "an Indiana Jones with Chinese characteristics, The Touch is a sumptuous adventure whose hi-tech visuals are undercut by that most low-tech aspect of filmmaking: the script". EasternKicks.com founder Andrew Heskins while praising Michelle Yeoh's performance, he said that the film "could be marketed in the west. It’s fun, beautifully photographed and unashamedly undemanding, it still has something to offer against the competition. Just don’t expect Crouching Tiger…"

== Accolades ==
Award	Year	Category	Recipient(s)	Result	Ref.
Academy Awards	2003	Best Foreign Language Film	Peter Pau	Disqualified	
CineAsia Awards	2002	Producer of the Year	Thomas Chung & Michelle Yeoh	Won	
Hong Kong Film Awards	2003	Best Cinematography	Peter Pau	Nominated	
Hong Kong Film Awards	2003	Best Action Choreography	Philip Kwok	Nominated	
Huabiao Awards	2002	Outstanding Co-Production Film	Thomas Chung & Michelle Yeoh	Won	
