= Reign of Assassins =

2010 Chinese-Hong Kong-Taiwanese film by John Woo

- Chinese film poster

Chinese name
- Traditional Chinese: 劍雨
- Simplified Chinese: 剑雨
Transcriptions
Standard Mandarin
- Hanyu Pinyin: Jiàn Yǔ
- Directed by: Su Chao-pin; John Woo
- Written by: Su Chao-pin
- Produced by: John Woo; Terence Chang; Ivy Zhong; Tina Shi; Lorraine Hoh
- Starring: Michelle Yeoh; Jung Woo-sung; Wang Xueqi; Barbie Hsu; Shawn Yue
- Cinematography: Horace Wong; Cheung Man-po; Lai Yiu-fai; Ng Man-ching; Ng Man-juen
- Edited by: Cheung Ka-fai
- Music by: Peter Kam
- Production company: Lion Rock Productions
- Distributed by: Media Asia (Hong Kong); Beijing Galloping Horse Film & TV Production (China)
- Release dates: September 28, 2010 (China); October 7, 2010 (Hong Kong); October 10, 2010 (Taiwan)
- Running time: 117 minutes
- Countries: China; Hong Kong; Taiwan
- Language: Mandarin
- Budget: $14 million
- Box office: $13.4 million

Reign of Assassins is a 2010 wuxia film directed by Su Chao-pin and co-directed by John Woo. The film is shot in China and set during the Ming Dynasty. The film stars Michelle Yeoh, who plays an assassin who tries to return to a normal life after being counseled by a monk. After saving her husband and herself from robbers, she attracts the attention of her former assassin gang.

The film began production on October 30 and was shot in China and Taiwan. While shooting, John Woo was on set continually advising director Su Chao-pin, which led to Woo being credited as a co-director. On September 3, 2010, Reign of Assassins had its premiere at the 67th annual Venice Film Festival, where it met acclaim from critics. It premiered in China on September 28, 2010, and was purchased by The Weinstein Company for North American release rights and by Lionsgate for United Kingdom release rights.

== Plot ==
Voiceover narration tells of a legendary Indian Buddhist monk, Bodhi, who founded the art of Kung Fu and the belief that his mummified remains has mystical powers.

The Dark Stone gang has found half of the remains are in Prime Minister Zhang's hands. They send assassins to kill him and his son Renfeng. Dark Stone's top assassin, Drizzle steals the remains and flees, dispatching Renfeng atop a bridge where she encounters Wisdom the monk. Wisdom is an accomplished martial artist who demonstrates Drizzle's swordsmanship has four fatal flaws and tries to persuade her to leave the assassin's life. After a three month association, he dies by her hands, a final demonstration intended to enlighten her. Drizzle's is overcome by sorrow and guilt and she engages a famous surgeon to changes her appearance. She assumes the identity of Zeng Jing, a common cloth merchant, meets the messenger Ah-sheng, and marries him.

The Dark Stone gang's leader, Wheel King, recruits and trains a new assassin, Turquoise, a merciless girl who murdered her fiancé and in-laws on her wedding night. The gang resolves to pursue Drizzle and the mummified remains. One of their high ranking members, Fatty Chen, is mysteriously assassinated.

Zeng Jing and Ah-sheng are caught in the midst of a bank robbery, but Zeng Jing defeat the robbers, revealing her whereabouts to Dark Stone. The Wheel King orders Lei Bin, the Magician, and Turquoise to hunt Drizzle down. They locate her despite her changed appearance. Drizzle, as Zeng Jing, states she wants to live a normal life, and the Wheel King promises freedom for Ah-sheng and herself in exchange for the half of the remains she possesses and her assistance collecting the other half. After relinquishing the remains, the gang refuses to release Drizzle. She kills the Magician and is pursued home by Lei Bin and Turquoise, collapsing wounded. Ah-sheng surprises the assassins with a pair of Cen-Ci swords which Lei Bin recognizes as Renfeng's weapons. Ah-Sheng defeats the assassins and takes Drizzle to the surgeon, who treats Drizzle's wounds and states that everything is pre-destined. Flashbacks reveal that Ah-sheng's true identify is Renfeng, who did not die from Drizzle's sword because he has situs inversus. He has also changed his appearance so that he can avenge his father's death. Drizzle finds out the truth and asks Renfeng if he has ever loved her. An emotional Renfeng tells her that is impossible because of what she and Dark Stone have done to his family, but he cannot bring himself to kill her and tells her to leave.

The Wheel King attempts to use the power of the remains to restore his bodily "defect"; he was castrated as a boy and uses the cover of being a low ranking eunuch to hide his criminal activities. Turquoise discovers this as she seduces him. Infuriated by her disappointed mockery, the Wheel King buries her alive under a bridge. Drizzle sets off a fireworks signal to summon him to a final battle. The Wheel King comes to a graveyard to find Renfeng dead. Drizzle wounds him fatally, using what Wisdom had taught her. Renfeng revives the next morning. He had been given tortoise powder by Drizzle to appear lifeless so he could witness Drizzle avenge his family. He finds her still alive and joyfully carries her off in his arms. Drizzle whispers to him "After we get home, draw up the divorce papers." Renfeng laughs and tells her they have a long life together ahead of them.

== Cast ==
=== Main ===
- Michelle Yeoh as Zeng Jing, Ah-sheng's wife and a cloth merchant who's revealed to be Drizzle.
- Jung Woo-sung as Jiang Ah-sheng, Zeng Jing's husband and a courier who's revealed to be Zhang Renfeng.

=== Dark Stone Gang ===
- Wang Xueqi as The Wheel King / Cao Feng, Chief of the Dark Stone gang.
- Barbie Hsu as Turquoise / Ye Zhanqing, an assassin of the Dark Stone gang trained to replace Drizzle.
- Shawn Yue as Lei Bin, an assassin of the Dark Stone gang.
- Jiang Yiyan as Tian Qingtong, Lei Bin's wife.
- Kelly Lin as Drizzle / Xi Yu, an assassin of the Dark Stone gang who disappears.
- Leon Dai as the Magician / Lian Sheng, an assassin of the Dark Stone gang.
- Ma Shuliang as Fatty Chen, a bookkeeper of the Dark Stone gang.

=== Others ===
- Guo Xiaodong as Zhang Renfeng, son of Prime Minister Zhang.
- Paw Hee-ching as Granny Cai, Zeng Jing and Jiang Ah-sheng's landlord and friend.
- Chin Shih-chieh as Doctor Li, a renowned face-changing surgeon who assists Zeng Jing and Ah-sheng.
- Matt Wu as Killer Bear / Sha Ren Xiong.
- Angeles Woo as Eater Bear / Chi Ren Xiong.
- Hu Xiaoguang as leader of Song Yang 5, a group of martial artists who robbed United Bank in search of the Bodhi's remains..
- Han Zhi as member of Song Yang 5.
- Xing Hanqing as member of Song Yang 5.
- Che Kim-fai as member of Song Yang 5.
- Shi Zhanjie as member of Song Yang 5.
- Lee Hing-cheung as Prime Minister Zhang Haiduan, Renfeng's father.
- You Liping as Zhang Dajing, the owner of United Bank.
- Qin Weidong as Butcher Zhu, a local butcher and matchmaking candidate for Zeng Jing.
- Yuan Zhi Dong as Kongdong Sect's Purple Sword / Zi Jian.
- Li Jun as Old Seven / Huang Qi.
- You Ben Chang as Monk Jian Chi, Wisdom's mentor.
- Wang Da Shun as Shen Bu.
- Chen Ji as Demon Granny / Gui Po.
- Qi Yi Ming as Demon Grandson / Gui Sun.
- Lei Min Min as Teahouse waiter.
- Tong Lei as Eunuch Cao / Cao gonggong.
- Peter Kam as General Huang.

=== Special appearances ===
- Pace Wu as Kongdong Sect's Teal Sword / Qing Jian.
- Calvin Li as Wisdom / Lu Zhu, Drizzle's first love.

== Production ==
=== Pre-production ===
The idea for making Reign of Assassins came about when producer Terence Chang was looking for an action film to star Michelle Yeoh. After several meetings with Su Chao-pin they developed a wuxia style film. Yeoh had initial doubts about the role as she had not used her martial arts skills since Crouching Tiger, Hidden Dragon. The rest of the film's cast includes actors from Taiwan, Korea, Hong Kong and China. John Woo stated that "It is a challenge for all. We selected various talented actors for this film and the language seemed to be the main obstacle...But we solved that."

Terence Chang and Su Chao-pin said that they wanted to take wuxia writer Gu Long's approach of "having many characters, and add mystery and suspense to the plot". The Chinese title of the film is Jianyu Jianghu, which translates as "swords and rain, rivers and lakes". The term jianghu refers to an imaginary world that is a parallel martial arts universe. Half of the film's budget was funded by Galloping Horse Films who agreed to support the film after being impressed with Su's script. To complete the financing, Chang had two Taiwanese investors: the online gaming company Gamania Digital Entertainment and film and television production house Lumiere Motion Picture Company to help fund the film.

=== Filming ===
Principal photography began on October 4, 2009 in Songjiang Town, Shanghai, China, and then moved to Hengdian World Studios. Part of the film was shot in Shanghai on October 30. The film was then set to be shot at the Shanghai Song Jiang Shen Qiang studio, then to move to the Hengdian World Studios outside the city, then over to Taiwan, where a quarter of the film was set to be made.

Principal photography was completed on February 27, 2010. After being impressed with the script, John Woo was reportedly on set the whole time offering advice to Su Chao-pin. Terrence Chang stated that Woo spent "more than a week" directing a fight scene featuring his daughter Angeles as an assassin. Angeles took the role to experience film-making from an actor's perspective. The official English credits read "Directed by Su Chao-pin. Co-directed by John Woo". Woo has stated that he "didn't want to impose my style on Su...I only gave advice and shared my experience." Production started in Shanghai and then moved to the World Studios complex at Hengdian in the second month. Heavy rains made production go over-schedule and a huge outdoor temple set had to be moved indoors to avoid further delays. Terence Chang applied for a Taiwanese government subsidy as the writer-director Su Chao-pin, as well as two investors, four executive producers and six major actors in the film are Taiwanese. Post-production was also done in Taiwan. John Woo worked with the editor during post-production on the film.

== Release ==
Before the film's release, The Weinstein Company bought from Fortissimo Films the right for a North American release of Reign of Assassins while Lions Gate Pictures UK received licensed for the United Kingdom. Reign of Assassins had its premiere on September 3, 2010 at the 67th annual Venice Film Festival where it was shown out of competition. The film was released in China on September 28, 2010. The film premiered in Hong Kong on October 7 and in Taiwan on October 10. Reign of Assassins was shown on October 8 at the 15th Busan International Film Festival. In China, Reign of Assassins made 30 million RMB (US$4.5 million) on its opening week. Reign Of Assassins was released theatrically in the United Kingdom on the 15th February, 2013.

=== Reception ===
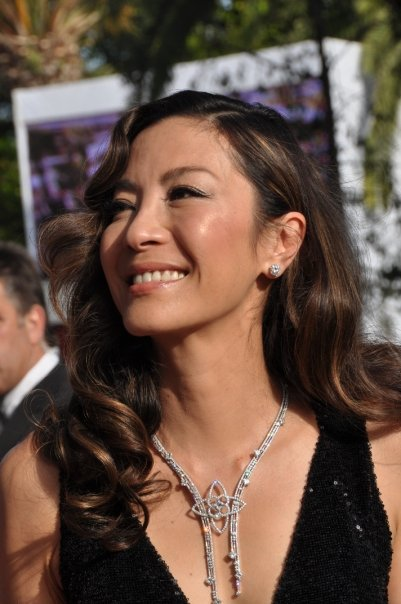
Michelle Yeoh received a Best Actress nomination at the Asian Film Awards for her role in Reign of Assassins.

The film received positive critical reception at the Venice Film Festival. L'Express praised the sword-fighting scenes in the film. Il Sole 24 Ore referred to the film as "a breath of fresh air" at the festival, noting the fighting scenes and the film's humor. The Hollywood Reporter wrote "the beautifully balanced story finds time for humor and a piercingly romantic finale. This lush visual treat should have no trouble finding kung fu audiences, with crossover potential to the Western art circuit." Variety gave the film a positive review, referring to it as "A delightful martial-arts romp that makes up in wit and exuberance what it occasionally lacks in clarity and finesse". Screen International wrote that "It might lack the sheer visual poetry of Crouching Tiger, Hidden Dragon, but its scenes of sword-play are wonderful and once the story gathers momentum it is absorbing and entertaining." and went on to praise the acting of Michelle Yeoh calling her a "wonderfully charismatic talent, aging gracefully but still retains a poise and style that really sets her apart." Derek Elley of Film Business Asia gave the film 9 stars out of 10 and wrote that "without heavy resort to visual effects, and without going too far down any one stylistic road, the film gives new life to a genre that's been pulled every which way in the past 20 years in search of new thrills."

The film received positive reception in Asia on its premiere. The Xinhua News Agency stated that the film "ushers in a new era of the kungfu genre" and that the film "spends a bit too much time unfolding the romance between Zeng and her husband, and some lines sound funny when they are not supposed to be. But when many recent martial arts films can barely tell a complete story and are hyped only by lavish sets, Assassins stands out as entertaining and special." Malaysiakini also compared the film to Crouching Tiger, Hidden Dragon, writing that "The movie sort of goes back to wuxia's roots, where the plot revolves tightly around the Chinese philosophy and relationship." Today gave the film three stars out of five, saying that "the storyline borders on the illogical at times – Su's script will get you sniggering...on-screen moments between Yeoh and Jung are uncomfortably stiff." Time Out Hong Kong gave the film three stars out of six stating that the film "is often too schizophrenic in tone to be taken seriously."

The film received mixed reviews from critics in the United Kingdom, generally critiquing the plot of the film. A review in The Guardian gave the film a mixed review, stating "After a decent enough opening it becomes a fairly ordinary affair". The Independent gave the film two stars, praising Yeoh's performance but finding the plot "far-fetched". Empire gave the film four stars out of five noting the action scenes and "surprisingly affecting character moments". Total Film magazine gave the film three stars out of five, opining that the film "lacks the plot punch of Zhang Yimou's Hero or the visual poetry of Ang Lee's Crouching Tiger, Hidden Dragon." On the review aggregator website Rotten Tomatoes, 67% of 9 critics' reviews are positive, with an average rating of 5.8/10.

=== Accolades ===
Awards
Ceremony	Category	Name	Outcome
17th Hong Kong Film Critics Society Awards	Best Director	Su Chao-pin	Won
17th Hong Kong Film Critics Society Awards	Films of Merit		Won
5th Asian Film Awards	Best Actress	Michelle Yeoh	Nominated
5th Asian Film Awards	Best Screenplay	Su Chao-pin	Nominated
5th Asian Film Awards	Best Music Score	Peter Kam	Nominated
30th Hong Kong Film Awards	Best Film		Nominated
30th Hong Kong Film Awards	Best Director	Su Chao-pin	Nominated
