= CARRS-Q =

Australian research centre

Coordinates: 27°27′05.55″S 153°00′58.91″E

Centre for Accident Research and Road Safety – Queensland
- Established: 1996
- Affiliations: Queensland University of Technology
- Location: Brisbane, Queensland, Australia
- Campus: Kelvin Grove
- Website: https://research.qut.edu.au/carrsq/

The Centre for Accident Research and Road Safety – Queensland (CARRS-Q) is a research centre established in 1996.

It is based at the Kelvin Grove campus of Queensland University of Technology (QUT) in Queensland, Australia and is part of the Faculty of Health.

The centre was established as a joint venture of the Motor Accident Insurance Commission (MAIC) and QUT, and also receives funding from competitive research grants for specific projects. CARRS-Q's stated vision is "for a safer world in which injury-related harm is uncommon and unacceptable", which it works toward by conducting research, training road safety professionals, and giving awards to other organisations or individuals for successful road safety initiatives.

== Areas of research ==
CARRS-Q's areas of research are currently divided into Intelligent Transport Systems, Occupational Road Safety, Regulation and Enforcement, Road Safety Infrastructure, School and Community Injury Prevention, and Vulnerable Road Users. The centre is part of the School of Psychology and Counselling in QUT's Faculty of Health, and some of its researchers have psychology qualifications and focus on the behavioural aspects of road safety.

== Teaching activities ==
CARRS-Q has Masters and PhD students, some of whom are concurrently employed as Research Officers.

== Research facilities ==
CARRS-Q has a range of equipment used in road safety research on driver behaviour, including an instrumented four-wheel drive (4WD) vehicle and a driving simulator.

The instrumented 4WD is equipped with sensors such as a multimedia datalogger, physiological devices (EEG, ECG and EMG), laser scanner, radars and eye trackers.

The CARRS-Q Driving Simulator was officially launched on 19 March 2010. It is based on a Holden Commodore sedan that was donated for the purpose, and sits on a six degrees of freedom motion platform.

== Queensland Road Safety Awards ==
The Queensland Road Safety Awards (QRSA) were first held in the year 2000 and are a joint initiative of CARRS-Q and the RACQ to "recognise and honour the outstanding efforts of individuals and groups who have started projects or programmes to improve safety on Queensland roads".

== Collaboration ==
CARRS-Q has links with similar organisations worldwide, such as the French National Institute for Transportation Safety Research (INRETS) and University of Michigan Transportation Research Institute (UMTRI), through exchange of visiting researchers and collaboration on research papers.
