= Branches of Wing Chun =

Martial arts disciplines

There are at least eight distinct lineages of the martial art Wing Chun. These are mostly little-known outside of China, and each has its own history of origin. In the West, Wing Chun's history has become a mix of fact and fiction due to the impacts of early secrecy and modern marketing. Additionally, there are competing genealogies within the same branch or about the same individual teacher.

The different branches of the Chinese martial art of Wing Chun can be thought of as describing both the differing traditions and interpretations of Wing Chun and the teacher-student relationships which perpetuate them.

== Ip Man ==
=== History ===
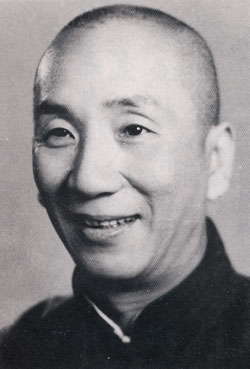
Yip Man

This lineage has a legend in which the nun Ng Mui saw a fight between a crane and a snake. She incorporated their fighting styles into her Shaolin Kung Fu to develop an unnamed style. She taught this to one of her students Yim Wing-chun; she taught her husband Leung Bok-chao, who named the style Wing Chun Kuen (Wing Chun boxing) in his wife's honor and who passed it to Leung Lan-kwai of the Red Boat Opera Company (although other versions of this legend state that he was a scholar and herbalist), who passed it on to Wong Wa-bo and Leung Yee-tai, both of the Red Boat Opera, and who both taught the herbalist Leung Jan.

Leung Jan passed it on to his two sons Leung Chun and Leung Bik plus other students who included Chan Wah-Shun, who taught his own students including Yip Man.

In another legend, Yip Man was attending school in Hong Kong during the 1910s, where he was invited by a friend to challenge a highly skilled old man. Yip Man did not win, and the old man was Leung Bik. Yip Man studied under Leung Bik for a few years before returning home to Foshan where he opened his own school. His students there have passed on his style, which is still taught in Foshan today.

Yip Man moved to Hong Kong in 1949; his was the first Wing Chun system to be taught publicly, and it has grown to become one of the most popular of the Chinese martial arts. A claim that his eldest son Yip Chun is the only inheritor of Yip Man's system is disputed by a number of Wing Chun schools, including those in Foshan.

=== Lineage ===
Ng Mui → Yim Wing-chun → Leung Bok-chao → Leung Lan-kwai → Wong Wah-bo & Leung Yee-tai → Leung Jan → Chan Wah-shun & Leung Bik → Ip Man

==== Ip man's most notable students ====
Leung Sheung, Lok Yiu, Chu Shong-tin, Ho Kam-ming, Lo Man-kam, Wong Shun-leung, William Cheung, Bruce Lee, Victor Kan, Ip Ching, Ip Chun, Hawkins Cheung, Moy Yat, and Leung Ting.

=== Features ===
Per Chu, Ritchie and Wu, Yip Man Wing Chun is known for its simplicity, directness, economy of motion, and encapsulation of the essential Wing Chun principles.

== Yuen Kay San ==
=== History ===
- According to this lineage, the "true founders of Wing Chun remain lost in time", with lineage originating from Red Boat Opera.
- Yuen Kay-shan was a master in the martial art of Wing Chun, who lived from 1889 to 1956, known as an undefeated champion of 1000 death duels in Foshan during the 1920-1950s. The fifth of five brothers, he became known as "Foshan Yuen Lo Jia" (Yuen the Fifth of Foshan). Yuen Kay-shan combined the Wing Chun of both of his teachers, constable Fok Bo-chuen and bodyguard and bounty hunter Fung Siu-ching.
- Currently the Yuen Kay-san lineage is centered at Guangzhou and spearheaded by Grandmaster Sum Nung.

=== Features ===
Additional emphasis on use of knives, six-and-a-half-point pole, and throwing darts.

=== Notable alumni ===
Sum Nung ->Teddy Wong]-> R.Yap

== Gu Lao Village / Forty Points Wing Chun ==
=== History ===
This branch was taught by Leung Jan when he retired back to his native village of Gu Lao in Heshan County, Guangdong province, and is typically referred to by the village name to distinguish it from the doctor's Foshan teachings. Leung Jan grew weary of inactivity while in retirement and chose to teach a small group of students in a new variation of Wing Chun that focuses on short drills.

To learn a single form from now-elderly Leung Jan, the villagers needed to pay a significant amount of money. Tam Yeung was one of Leung Jan's students who would learn this system in entirety.

=== Features ===
- The Gu Lao Wing Chun is referred to as Forty Points Wing Chun.
- Guo Lao Wing Chun uses 40 short drills which are a loose expression and application of Wing Chun. It functions like normal Wing Chun, only deviating in the ways it is taught in.

=== Notable alumni ===
Tam Yeung, Kwan Jong-yuen, Robert Chu

== Nanyang / Cao Dean ==
=== History ===
According to this lineage of Wing Chun, the art was conceived at Red Boat Opera, being based on the knowledge of both Jee Shim (presenting the "Always Spring" variation) and Ng Mui (presenting the "Praise Spring" variation). The Wing Chun from Cho On sifu is also called Ban Chung Wing Chun / Ban Chung Cho Ga Wing Chun.

A Red Boat Opera performer identified as "Painted Face Kam" passed his Wing Chun knowledge to Cho Duk-sang, who came from a family known for Hung Ga Kuen. Duk-sang would be the first to venture outside the family martial art. The branch pioneer Cao Dean (Cho Dak-on, unrelated to Duk-sang) became a student of Cho Duk-sang after getting beaten in an altercation. Under elder Cho, Dean would eventually master Wing Chun as a young adult.

Cao Dean initially taught Wing Chun at Hong Kong, but unemployment forced him to move to Malaysia for the second time in his life. There, he would become a chef specializing in Cantonese cuisine. Word of Cao Dean's martial arts prowess started to spread, with locals wanting to learn Cao Dean's art. He initially began teaching smaller groups, but as willing students grew in numbers, Cao Dean would establish a dedicated Wing Chun school—the first in the Malay peninsula.

Cao Dean died in 1980s at 90 years old. Cao Dean's lineage was succeeded by S.Y. Liu and others including S.Y.Liu's nephew Ku Choi Wah, who learnt initially from S.Y.Liu and later became a direct student of Cao Dean / Cho On. However, circa 2015, S.Y. Liu is no longer involved in martial arts. Presently, the Nanyang lineage is mainly headed by Y. Wu in Singapore and Sydney, Australia. Another direct student of Cao Dean / Cho On, Ku Choi Wah continues to separately teach and propagate the Ban Chung Cho Ga Wing Chun in Malaysia, with his students running classes in Malaysia, Singapore, Thailand and India.

=== Lineages ===
Chi Sim → Red Boat Opera
& Leung Bok-chao → Red Boat Opera

Red Boat Opera → Painted Face Kam → Cho Duk-sang → Cao Dean (Cho Dak-On)

Cao Dean → S.Y Liu → Y. Wu (present head)

Another lineage:

Red Boat Opera → Painted Face Kam → Cho Duk-sang → Cao Dean (Cho Dak-On)

Cao Dean → Ku Choi Wah (also studied under his own uncle S.Y Liu)

=== Features ===
Nanyang Wing Chun contains many forms and concepts. It has great amount of techniques, including strikes, joint-locks, throws, and weapon techniques. A video interview and demonstration of Ban Chung Cho Ga Wing Chun by Ku Choi Wah sifu covered by an international Wing Chun research team led by Vik Hothi sifu presents some intricacies of the system.

The unique aspect of this style of Wing Chun is the single long Siu Lim Tao form. The fist strikes utilise the Phoenix Eye fist and the Leopard Paw fist.

The general version of the single long Siu Lim Tao form can be found here.

The general curriculum followed under Ku Choi Wah in the Ban Chung Cho Ga Wing Chun is:

Unarmed patterns (空手套路): Thirteen Hands (Sup Sam Sao/十三手), Little Idea (Siu Lim Tao/小念頭), Sticking Hands Cavity (Mor Kiu), Smashing into Pieces (Sui Da/碎打), Flower Fist (Fa Kuen/花拳) and Wooden Dummy Set (Muk Yan Jong/木人桩)

Weapons Patterns (武器套路): Six and Half Points Thirteen Spear (Luk Dim Pun Gwan Sap Sam Cheong/六点半棍十三枪) and Man Character Knives (Yan Jee Dao /人字刀)

Drills /Exercises (训练演习/演练): Eight Sticking Points (Chi Bat Dim /持八点), Empty Dummy (Hong Jong//空桩) and Staff Dummy (Gwan Jong/棍桩 ).

Training Tools (训练器材): Chopstick (筷子), Swallow Plaque (Yin Jee Pai /燕子牌), Rattan Rings (藤环), Iron Rings (铁环) and Pull Horse Rope (拉马绳)

== Pan Nam ==
=== History ===
According to this lineage, Wing Chun was a yet-unnamed martial art that was conceived by the anti-Qing-Empire Tiandihui, being combination of various Shaolin martial arts, such as Taijiquan, Ying Jow Pai, Tong Long Quan, (Note: Unspecified if referring to either Northern or Southern Mantis style of Chinese martial arts.) gum gang jeung, Chin Na, and other martial arts.

A Siu Lam nun known as Yat Chum Um-jee (in Mandarin Chinese Yi Chen Anzhu) (Speck of Dust, Founder of Convent) would establish a convent in Hengshan, where she taught the nameless style to select students. Among these students was a man nicknamed "Tan Sao-ng", who handled costumes of the Hunanese Opera Company. Subsequently, he fled Hunan to Foshan. There, Tan Sao-ng's students would train Wong Wah-bo, Leung Yee-tai, Dai Fan Min-kam, and Lai Fook-shun. In this lineage, the "Wing" in Wing Chun comes from Chan Wing-wah, one of the founders of Hongmen.

Branch founder Pan Nam initially studied Hung Gar from 1934 to 1947 until he met Jiu Chow, a student of Chan Yiu-men, son of Chan Wah-shun. From there, he officially began his Wing Chun Kuen training. His classmates included Leung Lam, Jiu Wan, Lee Shing, Wong Jing, and other semi-famous Wing Chun masters. Jiu Chow had to relocate to Zhongshan, and Pan followed him to continue training.

In 1949 Pan Nam moved back to Fatshan and started teaching at the "Union of Cake Industry Workers of Fatshan". In either 1956 or 1957, Pan Nam attended Guangdong Provincial martial arts competitions, where he was introduced to Lai Hip-chai, a classmate of Ng Chun-so, Yip Man, and Chan Yiu-men, who was the second to last student accepted by Chan Wah-shun (Yip Man being the last). Lai Hip-chai had not only learned from Chan, but also from Lok Lan-goon's nephew.

Lai Hip-chai died in 1970. Pan Nam continued teaching Wing Chun in Foshan until his death in December 1995. Grandmaster Eddie Chong was Nam's final student, and he brought Nam's system to the United States in the early 1990s, where Chong is based in Sacramento, California. Chong has been vital in helping preserve the Pan Nam style of Wing Chun, which Chong has taught for many decades.

=== Lineage ===
Yat Chum Um-jee (Yi Chen Anzhu) → Cheung Ng / Tan Sao-ng

==== Jiu Chow ====
Chung Ng / Tan Sao-ng → Wong Wah-bo & Leung Yee-tai → Leung Jan → Chan Wah-shun → Chan Yiu-men → Jiu Chow → Pan Nam

==== Lai Hip-chi (Li Xiechi) ====
Lineage A: Chung Ng / Tan Sao-ng → Wong Wah-bo & Leung Yee-tai → Leung Jan → Chan Wah-shun → Lui Yiu-chai → Lai Hip-chi

Lineage B: Chung Ng / Tan Sao-ng → Dai Fa Min-kam → Lok Lan-gong & Lok's nephew → Lai Hip-chi

Lai Hip-chi → Pan Nam

=== Features ===
Pam Nam lineages have significant differences to the likes of the Ip Man and Yuen Kay-shan lineages. It is also uncertain if this lineage refers the style as Wing Chun or Weng Chun.

The Pan Nam lineage emphasizes more realistic, chaotic, and less-refined aspects of Wing Chun and features additional self-defense techniques based on ripping, tearing, and use of fingers.

Pan Nam has a set named "Five Petal Plum Flower", a classic five-part exercise set for tendon strength. It incorporates a partner practice known as Waist Pressing, a Push-Hands-like exercise where the partners try to unbalance one another.

== Pao Fa Lien ==
=== History ===
This lineage of Wing Chun originates from a unspecified Shaolin Temple. Following the destruction of the temple at the hands of the Qing Empire, the survivors swore to use their knowledge to destroy them. According to this lineage, the name Wing Chun is a shortened form of the revolutionary motto "Wing yun chi jee; Mo mong Hon Juk; Dai dei wu chun." A secret code that allowed the anti-Qing revolutionaries to recognize each other. Eventually, the codeword was shortened to Wing Chun (Always Spring.)

Because of the secrecy of the anti-Qing rebellious activities, the exact details of Wing Chun's development were lost. At the turn of the 19th century, a monk identified as Dai Dong-fong emerged to support the anti-Qing rebellion. His martial skills earned the terror of Manchurian armies and as a result, the Qing authorities wished to apprehend Dai Dong-fong.

He would settle in Qingyuan, Guangdong where he encountered the Tse brothers - Tse Gwok-leung and Tse Gwok-cheung- who were Mandarins reluctantly fighting for the Qing government and took Dai Dong-fong to safety. In return for their kindness and seeing their good character, Dai Dong-fong taught the brothers his martial art, Wing Chun.

Dai Dong-fong would eventually leave to travel to northern China. Subsequently, the Tse brothers adopted an infant by the name of Lao Dat-sang. As a young man, Lao Dat-sang was an earnest woodworker, who earned various nicknames related to his line of work - eventually earning the famous nickname Pao Fa Lien or "Wood Planer Lien".

=== Features ===
Pao Fa Lien branch is unique for its emphasis on weapon-based combat. Contains 28 forms. 10 forms are dedicated for bare-handed fighting, with rest meant for weapon-based fighting and/or wooden dummy practice. Includes a kwan-dao form, that is not practised in other major lineages.

== Hung Suen / Hung Gu Biu ==
=== History ===
According to the legend of this lineage, before the destruction of the Shaolin temple the system called Wing Chun had already been developed there from generations of martial arts knowledge. To prevent Wing Chun from being misused, it was passed down to only a few disciples and was not documented.

During Manchurian massacres, two Siu Lam monks managed to flee; Yat Chum Dai-chi and his pupil, Cheung Ng. Before his death, Yat Chum Dai-si passed his full knowledge on Cheung Ng. Cheung Ng joined Red Boat Opera Company in order to keep his identity as a Siu Lam monk hidden, and to evade the Manchurian government. Within Red Boat Opera, Cheung Ng would become known as Tan Sao-ng, because of his martial arts mastery. Cheung Ng would come in contact with Hung Gu-biu, who was a secret society leader and successfully recruited Cheung Ng and became his student. To protect the true identity of Cheung Ng, they conceived the Ng Mui legend - in which a Siu Lam abbess would teach a girl named Yim Wing-chun the former's martial arts style.

The "Yim Wing Chun" name was chosen for specific reasons, as Yim could be understood as word for "Secret" or "Protected", and "Wing Chun" referring to Siu Lam Wing Chun Tong (the Always Spring Hall). With "Yim Wing Chun" being a secret code for "the secret art of Siu Lam Wing CHun Hall."

Hung Gu-biu was among the first generation of Wing Chun students under Cheung Ng. The other students of the first generation were Wong Wah-bo, Leung Yee-tai, Dai Fa Min-kam, Lo Man-gong, Siu Sang Hung-fook and Gao Lo-chung. Each of these students - based on their individual understanding of what Cheung Ng taught - would pass on their own renditions of Wing Chun, each having their own lineages with distinct emphasized elements.

Branch pioneer Hung Gu Biu's lineage would become known as Hung Suen Wing Chun. This lineage only passed down Wing Chun to their own family members, who would take a ceremonial oath of secrecy.

=== Lineage ===
Siu Lam Temple (where Wing Chun was already conceived at) → Yat Chum Dai-chi → Cheung Ng → Hung Gu-biu → Cheung Gung → Wang Ting → Dr. Wang Ming → Garrett Gee (Chu King-hung)

=== Features ===
Hung Suen Wing Chun aims to educate its students more on Wing Chun's underlying concepts, principles and theories over individual techniques.

== Jee Shim / Weng Chun ==
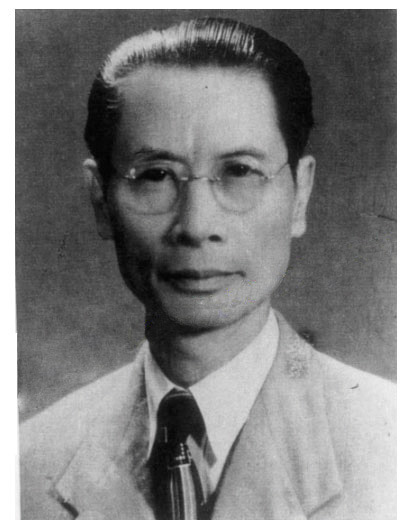
Grandmaster Chu Chung-man is identified as an integral part of this lineage

=== History ===
According to the legend of this lineage, Wing Chun descends from Jee Shim, an abbot of the Shaolin Temple. Here, Jee Shim escaped with other Siu Lam Temple monks and would eventually settle as a cook aboard Red Boat Opera Company. Jee Shim's style was passed on Wong Wah-bo and Sun Kam (alias Dai Fa-nim or Painted Face Kam).

While in Foshan looking for new costumes, Sun Kam would get into an altercation with Fung Siu-ching, an apprentice of a local tailor. After defeating Fung, the latter would become Sun Kam's apprentice at Red Boat and learn Wing Chun. Subsequently, Fung Siu-ching would become a bounty hunter and would teach Jee Shim Wing Chun to various students.

In 1995, Andreas Hoffman was certified as a successor of Jee Shim Wing Chun.

=== Lineage ===
Chi Sim → Sun Kam (Painted-Face Kam) → Fung Siu-ching

Fung Siu-ching → Dong Suen → Dong Yik → Way Yan
Fung Siu-ching → Unspecified students → Lo Chiu-wan & Lo Hong-tai → Way Yan
Fung Siu-ching → Dong Jit → Chu Chong-man → Way Yan

Way Yan → Cheng Kwong → Andreas Hoffman (current head)

=== Features ===
This lineage contains techniques that deviate from contemporary Wing Chun, that was passed down by Ng Mui and/or Leung Bok-chao. The difference is pronounced enough that the Wing Chun style of this lineage is considered its own martial art, Weng Chun. This view is supported by Ip Man lineage.

== Other notable Wing Chun branches ==
=== Law-family / Snake-Pattern Wing Chun ===
This lineage was originates from Leung Bok-chau, husband of Yim Wing-chun. When in Guangxi, Leung Bok-chau taught his martial art to Law Man-gung, who was kung fu brother of Leung Lan-kwai. Law Man Gung would pass down the knowledge to Fok Bo-chuen, who would be one of the Wing Chun teachers of Yuen brothers. This lineage doesn't exist as its own lineage anymore. Elements of this lineage are mainly continued by Yuen Chai-wan and Yiu Choi/Yiu Kai lineages and has a strong presence in Vietnamese Wing Chun.

==== Lineage ====
Leung Bok-chau → Law Man-gung → Fok Bo-chuen

==== Technique ====
Per Leung Ting, the Snake-pattern technique is quite soft and imitates the movements of a snake. The Snake-pattern Wing Chun only contains a single bare-handed form, Siu Lin Tao (which is not the Siu Nim Tao.) The Double broadswords used by this lineage appear more machete-like than usual Wing Chun knives.

=== Yuen Chai Wan / Nguyen Te Cong / Vietnamese Wing Chun ===
Yuen Chai-wan - alias Nguyễn Tế-Công - Older brother of Yuen Kay-san, Yuen first learned Wing Chun Kuen under Fok Bo-chuen and later continued his studies with Fung Siu-ching. In 1936 he was invited to teach Wing Chun in Vietnam at the Nanhai and Shunde Expatriates Associations and moved to Hanoi, where he was known by the Vietnamese pronunciation of his name, Nguyen Te-cong. In 1954 he relocated to Saigon (now, Ho Chi Minh City) where he established a second school.

==== Notable alumni ====
Tran Thuc Tien

=== Yiu Choi / Yiu Kai ===
==== History ====
Yiu Choi first began learning Wing Chun Kuen from Yuen Chai-wan, the elder brother of Yuen Kay-san, in roughly 1920 and studied with him until Yuen moved to Vietnam in 1936, just after the death of his Sifu Fung Siu-ching.

Just before he left, Yuen introduced Yiu Choi to his friend and fellow Wing Chun Kuen practitioner, Chan Wah-shun, to continue his studies. At the same time, he also learned from Chan Wah-shun's student Ng Chung-so.

==== Technique ====
Per Leung Ting, out of the other lineages, the Yiu Choi / Yiu Kai branch is Wing Chun Kung Fu is the closest to Yip Man branch's.

==== Lineage ====
Lineage A: Red Boat Opera → "Painted Face Kam" → Fok Bo-chuen & Fung Siu-ching → Yuen Chai-wan → Yiu Choi
Lineage B: Red Boat Opera → Wong Wah-bo → Leung Jan → Chan Wah-shun → Yiu Choi

Notable alumni: Fok Chiu

=== Fujian Wing Chun Kuen ===
Fujian Wing Chun is a group of associated martial arts originated from Fujian Shaolin Temple, where Jee Shim taught martial arts at the temple's Wing Chun Dien (Always Spring Hall). After destruction of the Fujian Shaolin Temple, the Fujian Wing Chun would be spread to Guangdong by Fong Sai-yuk and Hung Hei-gun.

=== Hung Suen - Hay Ban Wing Chun ===
This branch comes from Red Boat Opera of modern era, where style of Wing Chun perpetuated and never left the Red Boat Opera, where it would continue developing. This branch was introduced to United States by Yeung Fook.

=== Gu Lao - Pien San Wing Chun / Side Body Wing Chun ===
Originates from Leung Jan's Gu Lao Wing Chun. Wong Wah-saam was 23 years old when he became Leung Jan's student, but Leung Jan died quite early in Wong's training. Wong is the originator of Fung-family variation of Gu Lao Wing Chun.

Focuses on moving to the side of the attacking opponent for offense and defense. This is contrary to most other styles of Wing Chun, especially of Ip Man's lineage. It utilizes 36 small drills, compared to the 40 Point System of main Gu Lao Wing Chun.

== Unique variants ==
Besides main lineages, there are highly specialized variations of Wing Chun system that have spawned from these lineages.

=== Practical Wing Chun ===
Advocated by Wan Kam-leung, student of Wong Shun-leung.

=== Jun Fan Gung Fu ===
Wing Chun variation conceived by Bruce Lee in 1962, before his creation of Jeet Kune Do. It is based on Ip Man lineage of Wing Chun, as Lee was instructed Ip Man and his senior student Wong Shun-leung. Following the 1964 encounter with Wong Jack-man, Bruce Lee distanced himself from Jun Fan Gung Fu, seeing that the reason why he failed to properly defeat Wong Jack-man was because he let guidelines of his own system compromise aliveness. In response, Bruce Lee ordered the closure of all Jun Fan Gung Fu schools, and instead focused on a new combat philosophy known as Jeet Kune Do.

Regardless, select early students of Bruce Lee - namely Jesse Glover, Taky Kimura, James Yimm Lee, Jerry Poteet and Ted Wong - preserved Jun Fan Gung Fu in its original form, after Lee had abandoned it.

== Bibliography ==
- Chu, Robert; Ritchie, Rene; Wu, Y. (2015). The Definitive Guide to Wing Chun's History and Tradition. Tuttle Publishing. ISBN 978-1-4629-1753-2.
- Leung, Ting (2000). Roots and Branches of Wing Tsun, Second edition (January 1, 2000). Leung Ting Co, Hong Kong. ISBN 962-7284-23-8.
