= Ip Man (TV series) =

- Poster
- Traditional Chinese: 葉問
- Simplified Chinese: 叶问
- Hanyu Pinyin: Yè Wèn
- Jyutping: Jip6 Man6
- Genre: Biographical romance, period, martial arts
- Written by: Charcoal Tan; Fan Xiaotian; Zhu Yili; Ren Sha
- Directed by: Fan Xiaotian; Zheng Wei; Hu Kai
- Presented by: Fan Xiaotian
- Starring: Kevin Cheng; Han Xue; Liu Xiaofeng; Chrissie Chau; Song Yang; Yu Rongguang; Yuen Wah; Bruce Leung
- Opening theme: "Leaves Ask the Frosty Sky" (叶问霜天) by Tu Honggang
- Ending theme: "Ask and Ask Again" (一问再问) by Han Xue
- Composer: Dai Fang
- Country of origin: China
- Original language: Mandarin
- No. of episodes: 50

Production
- Executive producers: Bu Yu; Chen Hua; Bai Fangcen; Wang Shaochun; Xu Dongliang; Zhu Lihua; Yang Zhuoxing; Charcoal Tan; Wei Ji
- Producers: Qin Ping; Wu Tao; Chen Qianyi; Chen Xi; Su Ying; Zhao Lei; Yang Fangfang; Jiang Haochen; Liu Yanfang; Xu Zhen
- Production location: China
- Running time: ≈45 minutes per episode
- Production companies: Suzhou Funa Films and Television

Original release
- Network: Shandong TV
- Release: 24 February – 9 March 2013

Ip Man (叶问) is a 2013 Chinese television series romanticising the life of Ip Man (Ye Wen), a Chinese martial artist specialising in Wing Chun. Starring Kevin Cheng as Ye Wen, the series was first shown in mainland China on Shandong TV from 24 February to 9 March 2013.

== Background ==
Directed by Fan Xiaotian, the series starred Kevin Cheng, who briefly appeared as a younger Ip Man in Ip Man: The Final Fight (2013) which starred Anthony Wong as a middle-aged Ip Man. Han Xue, Liu Xiaofeng, Chrissie Chau, Song Yang, Yu Rongguang, Yuen Wah and Bruce Leung were cast in supporting roles. Wilson Yip, the director of the Ip Man film series (starring Donnie Yen), and Taiwanese television series producer Young Pei-pei served as the artistic consultants. The real-life Ip Man's sons, Ip Chun and Ip Ching, were invited to be the martial arts consultants for the series. The series was shot from July to November 2012 in Kunshan, Suzhou, and was first aired on Shandong TV from 24 February to 9 March 2013. It won the Golden Eagle Award for Best Television Series in 2012.

== Plot summary ==
The series is divided into six segments, each focusing on a different stage in Ye Wen's life as he moves from his birthplace Foshan to Guangzhou and eventually to Hong Kong. He meets various people who have left an impact on his life, including the revolutionary Fu Zhengyun, his first martial arts teacher Yu Fengjiu, the Wing Chun master Chen Huashun, his third martial arts teacher Liang Bi, his wife Zhang Yongcheng, and his senior-turned-rival Lin Qingshan.

== Cast ==
- Kevin Cheng as Ye Wen
  - Zhou Jianan as Ye Wen (younger)
- Han Xue as Zhang Yongcheng
- Liu Xiaofeng as Lin Qingshan
  - Zang Zhizhong as Lin Qingshan (younger)
- Chrissie Chau as Jenny
- Song Yang as Si
- Han Zhenhua as Ye Wen's father
- Zhang Ruijia as Ye Wen's mother
- Chen Hongjin as Ye Zhun
- Yu Rongguang as Yu Fengjiu
- Yuen Wah as Chen Huashun
- Bruce Leung as Liang Bi
- Bryan Leung as Master Hong
- Jiang Kai as Fu Zhengyun
- Yu Hai as Tong Zhanpeng
- Kou Zhenhai as Zhang Yintang
- Pu Chaoying as landlady
- Liu Yajin as postman
- Liu Xianchen as Zhang Yongsheng
- Yuan Bingyan as Qiu Jianyun
- Xu Xiangdong as Jiang Sheng
- Li Qingxiang as Lu Changyi
- Liu Hailong as Yan Chunlai
- Wang Weiguo as Marshal Zhu
- Mou Fengbin as Guimen Longyi / Guimen Long'er
- Yu Yankai as Brother Lu
- Yang Qianli as Yan Dong
- Zhou Zhong as Mo Renchao

== Production ==
There was fierce competition among many companies over the rights to the production of a television series about Ip Man since Wilson Yip's movies Ip Man and Ip Man 2 (starring Donnie Yen) came into the limelight. Around June 2012, Suzhou Funa Films and Television acquired the rights to produce the television series. Fan Xiaotian, who previously directed many Chinese television series, was selected as the director, while Hong Kong screenwriter Charcoal Tan was chosen to write the script. Wilson Yip and Taiwanese producer Young Pei-pei served as artistic consultants while the real-life Ip Man's sons, Ip Chun and Ip Ching, were invited to be martial arts consultants for the series.

Shooting for Ip Man began in July 2012 and finalized in around November.

After the release of Ip Man, BBC UKChina conducted a telephone interview with Fan Xiaotian about the television series. Fan mentioned that the earlier Ip Man films were too short, and that his purpose in creating the television series was to present a more developed and lively story about Ip Man which allows audiences to explore the character in greater depth. He also felt it was a very opportune time to produce a television series about Ip Man because Wilson Yip's Ip Man movies were very successful and influential, and also because Wong Kar-wai was making The Grandmaster when Ip Man (TV series) was in production.

Fan Xiaotian and Young Pei-pei were keen on recruiting actor Vincent Zhao, who has a background in martial arts, to play the lead character. Taking some netizens' opinions and suggestions into account, the production team also considered casting Han Geng, Wu Chun, Wallace Chung and Wallace Huo in the series. However, the role of Ip Man eventually went to Hong Kong TVB artiste Kevin Cheng. Han Xue was chosen to portray Ip Man's wife Cheung Wing-sing (Mandarin: Zhang Yongcheng). Other cast members include Liu Xiaofeng, Chrissie Chau, Yu Rongguang, Yuen Wah, Bruce Leung, Song Yang and Kou Zhenhai.

In September 2012, the cast and crew of Ip Man appeared at a publicity event in Suzhou to promote the television series.

== Broadcasts ==
Region	Network	Date(s)
China	Shandong TV	24 February – 9 March 2013
Malaysia	Astro On Demand	11 March – 17 May 2013
Australia	TVBJ	12 March 2013 –
Hong Kong	Drama 2	10 June 2013 –
Singapore	VV Drama	20 July 2013 –
China	Sichuan TV	1–25 August 2013
China	Guizhou TV	1–25 August 2013
China	Henan TV	1–25 August 2013
China	Xinjiang TV	1–25 August 2013
China	CCTV-1	19 August 2013 –
South Korea	AsiaN	11 September 2013 –
Taiwan	ETTV Movie	11 January 2014 –
China	Shaanxi TV	12 May 2014 –
Thailand	True4U	5 October 2014 –
Hong Kong	HD Jade	TVB Sales Presentation 2014
Indonesia	Trans7	20 July – 11 September 2015
Indonesia	ANTV	9 – 22 June 2025

== Home media ==
The full Ip Man series is available in Mandarin, with Mandarin subtitles, on popular free video streaming sites in the US.

The first ten episodes of this 50 episode series was released by Cinedigm in North American, on DVD and Blu-ray on October 10, 2017. The 45 minute episodes feature Mandarin audio with English subtitles.

== See also ==
- The Legend Is Born – Ip Man
