= Ip Man (film series) =

Hong Kong action film series

- Series logo
- Directed by: Wilson Yip (1-3, 5); Yuen Woo-ping (4)
- Written by: Edmond Wong (1-5); Chan Tai-lee (1, 3-5); Jil Leung (3); Dana Fukazawa (5); Jil Leung Lai Yin (5)
- Based on: Ip Man
- Produced by: Raymond Wong (1-5); Donnie Yen (4-5); Wilson Yip (5)
- Starring: Donnie Yen (1-3, 5); Lynn Hung (1-3); Max Zhang (Master Z: The Ip Man Legacy)
- Cinematography: O Sing-Pui (1); Poon Hang-sang (2); Kenny Tse (3); Cheng Siu-Keung (5)
- Edited by: Cheung Ka-fai (1-3, 5)
- Music by: Kenji Kawai (1-3, 5); Day Tai (4)
- Production companies: Dreams Salon Entertainment Culture (3); Pegasus Motion Pictures (3); Starbright Communications (3); Super Hero Films (3); Orange Sky Golden Harvest (4); Mandarin Motion Pictures (4-5); Enlight Pictures (4); Young Enlight Productions (4); Tin Tin Film Production (5)
- Distributed by: Mandarin Films (1-2); Pegasus Motion Pictures (3); Universal Studios (4); Well Go USA (5)
- Running time: 534 minutes
- Country: Hong Kong
- Languages: Chinese (dialect: Cantonese; Mandarin); English
- Budget: US$140.6 million
- Box office: US$426.2 million

Ip Man is a series of Hong Kong martial arts films loosely based on the life events of the Wing Chun master of the same name. The progenitor of the series was Ip Man (2008), which was followed by three sequels: Ip Man 2 (2010), Ip Man 3 (2015), and Ip Man 4: The Finale (2019), as well as the spin-off Master Z: Ip Man Legacy (2018). All four main films were directed by Wilson Yip, written by Edmond Wong, produced by Raymond Wong, and starred Donnie Yen as the titular character. Mandarin Films released the first two films in Hong Kong, which earned more than $37 million with a budget of around $24.6 million. As of 2023, the four main films and the spin-off have grossed $426.2 million worldwide combined.

Donnie Yen has mentioned that each film has a unique theme: the first Ip Man film is about "survival", Ip Man 2 focuses on "making a living and adaptation", and Ip Man 3 focuses on "life" itself. The fourth film was originally announced to be the last film in the main series and concludes with the death of Ip Man; however a fifth film was announced in May 2023.

== Films ==
=== Ip Man (2008) ===
Ip Man was directed by Wilson Yip and written by Edmond Wong. It was Raymond Wong's idea to develop a biographical film about Wing Chun master Ip Man. Principal photography began in Shanghai in March 2008 and ended in August. The film was released in Hong Kong on 18 December 2008 by Mandarin Films, and earned around US$21.8 million against the US$11.7 million budget. Donnie Yen portrayed the role of Ip Man in the film, set in the 1930s, focuses on events in Ip's life in the city of Foshan during the Sino-Japanese War.

=== Ip Man 2 (2010) ===
The sequel is set in 1949, when Ip Man moved to Hong Kong and attempts to promote Wing Chun in the region. It was intended to focus on the relationship between Ip Man and his most famed disciple Bruce Lee. The film was directed by Yip and written by Edmond Wong, while Raymond Wong produced the film and was released in Hong Kong on 29 April 2010 by Mandarin Films. The film grossed more than $50 million against the budget of $12.9 million.

=== Ip Man 3 (2015) ===
Principal photography began in Shanghai on 25 March 2015, which Yip is again directing the film based on the script by Wong. Donnie Yen again portrays the role of Ip Man, along with him Mike Tyson also plays the role of a street fighter. Bruce Lee's character was initially supposed to be featured in CGI, because the producers could not find an actor who could portray Lee convincingly, but Danny Chan was eventually cast in the role.

Principal photography for Ip Man 3 began on 25 March 2015, and the film was released in Hong Kong on 24 December 2015.

=== Ip Man 4: The Finale (2019) ===
On 30 September 2016, Yen announced via Facebook that he and Wilson Yip would continue the franchise with Ip Man 4. The film was released on 20 December 2019, and portrays Ip Man traveling to San Francisco to secure a spot for his son at a local school. Meanwhile, he crosses paths with his student, Bruce Lee, who had set up a Wing Chun school there. The film ends with Ip Man’s death from cancer in 1972. The film was originally announced to be the last film in the main series.

== Future films ==
=== Master Z sequel ===
In April 2019, it was reported that Max Zhang is set to reprise his role in a sequel to Master Z: Ip Man Legacy. The budget of the sequel was reported to be $13 million, significantly less than the first film's budget of $28 million.

=== Ip Man 5 ===
On 18 May 2023, a new Ip Man film titled Ip Man 5 was announced by Mandarin Motion Pictures at the Cannes Film Festival. Donnie Yen also unveiled the poster for the film on his Instagram.

== Recurring cast and characters ==
List indicators

This section includes characters who have appeared in a film in the series.

- An empty grey cell indicates the character was not in the film.
- ^{A} indicates an appearance through archival footage or audio.

Character	Film				
Character	Ip Man	Ip Man 2	Ip Man 3	Master Z: Ip Man Legacy	Ip Man 4: The Finale
Ip Man	Donnie Yen	Donnie Yen	Donnie Yen	Donnie Yen^{A}	Donnie Yen
Cheung Wing-sing	Lynn Hung	Lynn Hung	Lynn Hung		Lynn Hung
Ip Chun	Li Chak	Li Chak			
Chow Ching-chuen	Simon Yam	Simon Yam			
Chow Kwong-yiu	Calvin Cheng	Calvin Cheng			
Kam Shan-chau	Louis Fan	Louis Fan			
Fatso		Kent Cheng	Kent Cheng		Kent Cheng
Liang Gen		Ngo Ka-nin			Ngo Ka-nin
Law-Chun-tin		Lo Mang	Lo Mang		Lo Mang
Bruce Lee		Jiang Dai-Yan	Danny Chan		Danny Chan
Cheung Tin Chi			Max Zhang	Max Zhang	
Cheung Fong			Can Cui	Henry Zhang	
Ma King-sang			Patrick Tam	Patrick Tam	
Ip Ching			Wang Yan Shi		He Ye

== Reception ==
=== Box office ===
Film	Year	Box office gross (US$)					Budget (US$)	Ref
Film	Year	HK	China	NA	Elsewhere	Worldwide	Budget (US$)	Ref
Ip Man	2008	$3,300,847	$13,728,640	—N/a	$5,084,936	$22,114,423	$11.7 million	
Ip Man 2	2010	$5,559,550	$33,973,412	$205,675	$9,983,317	$49,721,954	$12.9 million	
Ip Man 3	2015	$7,842,871	$124,101,198	$2,679,437	$22,221,247	$156,844,753	$36 million	
Master Z: Ip Man Legacy	2018	$1,976,450	$19,490,366	$209,454	$156,379	$21,832,649	$28 million	
Ip Man 4: The Finale	2019	$3,725,263	$165,290,606	$3,956,031	$2,685,469	$175,657,369	$52 million	
Total		$22,404,981	$356,584,222	$7,050,597	$40,131,348	$426,171,148	$140.6 million	

=== Critical response ===
Film	Rotten Tomatoes	Metacritic
Ip Man	85% (27 reviews)	59% (9 reviews)
Ip Man 2	96% (28 reviews)	67% (13 reviews)
Ip Man 3	76% (51 reviews)	57% (14 reviews)
Master Z: Ip Man Legacy	89% (37 reviews)	72% (14 reviews)
Ip Man 4: The Finale	87% (31 reviews)	62% (11 reviews)

== Home media ==
Ip Man Trilogy, a Blu-ray compilation that features the first three films in the series, was released by Well Go USA in November 2016. The Blu-ray also includes special features such as deleted scenes, "behind-the-scenes" featurette and interviews with Donnie Yen and Mike Tyson.

== See also ==
- The Grandmaster
- Ip Man: The Final Fight
- The Legend Is Born: Ip Man
