= Mindful Wing Chun =

Martial arts school in Hong Kong

Mindful Wing Chun is a martial arts school based in Hong Kong that teaches traditional Wing Chun techniques with an emphasis on mindfulness practices. The school was founded by Nima King and traces its lineage to Ip Man, a prominent Wing Chun grandmaster known for teaching Bruce Lee. Mindful Wing Chun offers both in-person and online classes.

== History and founding ==
Mindful Wing Chun was established by Nima King, an Iranian immigrant to Hong Kong. King trained under established Wing Chun practitioners and founded the school to integrate mindfulness practices with traditional martial arts instruction. The school aims to make Wing Chun accessible to a wider audience while maintaining core principles of the discipline.

== Philosophy and approach ==
The school combines traditional Wing Chun techniques with mindfulness practices. This approach emphasizes the development of both physical skills and mental focus. The curriculum includes practical self-defense training and aims to cultivate mental clarity and body awareness.

== Lineage and legacy ==
Mindful Wing Chun traces its lineage to Ip Man, whose teachings have influenced multiple generations of Wing Chun practitioners. The school continues to teach traditional techniques while adapting them to contemporary contexts.

== Cultural impact ==
Mindful Wing Chun operates within the broader context of Hong Kong's martial arts tradition. Its incorporation of mindfulness reflects contemporary interest in mental well-being and personal development. The school's offerings include classes for local and international students.
