= Master Z: Ip Man Legacy =

2018 Hong Kong-Chinese film by Yuen Woo-ping

- Movie poster
- Traditional Chinese: 葉問外傳：張天志
- Simplified Chinese: 叶问外传：张天志
- Directed by: Yuen Woo-ping
- Written by: Edmond Wong; Chan Tai-lee
- Produced by: Raymond Wong; Donnie Yen; Dave Bautista
- Starring: Max Zhang; Dave Bautista; Liu Yan; Xing Yu; Michelle Yeoh; Tony Jaa
- Cinematography: Seppe Van Grieken
- Edited by: Eric Kwong
- Music by: Day Tai
- Production companies: Orange Sky Golden Harvest; Mandarin Motion Pictures; Enlight Pictures; Young Enlight Productions
- Release dates: 20 December 2018 (Hong Kong); 21 December 2018 (China)
- Running time: 107 minutes
- Countries: Hong Kong; China
- Languages: Cantonese; English
- Budget: $28 million
- Box office: $21.6 million

Master Z: Ip Man Legacy (Chinese: 葉問外傳：張天志) is a 2018 martial arts film directed by Yuen Woo-ping and produced by Raymond Wong, Donnie Yen, and Dave Bautista. A Hong Kong-Chinese co-production, it is a spin-off of the Ip Man film series, and takes place after the 2015 film Ip Man 3. This film stars Max Zhang, Dave Bautista, Michelle Yeoh, Tony Jaa, and Liu Yan, and was released on 21 December 2018.

== Plot ==
After being defeated by Ip Man, (Note: As depicted in Ip Man 3.) Cheung Tin-chi lives a depressed life moonlighting as a mercenary before choosing to leave behind martial arts altogether and instead open a grocery store on the ground floor of his house. While on a delivery run, he runs into an opium addict named Nana and her friend Julia who are both fleeing from drug dealer Tso Sai Kit. Tin-chi ends up fighting with Kit's gang and defeats them single-handedly.

The Royal Hong Kong Police Force arrive and arrest everyone. Kit and his gang are released after bribing a corrupt police commissioner named J.C. Wright, while Nana and Julia are released by name-dropping Julia's brother, Fu, the owner of Gold Bar, one of the most popular bars on Bar Street. Tin-chi is eventually released late at night and is unable to take his son to a steakhouse called Petrus for his birthday.

Following the incident, Kit decides to seek out Tin-chi, with his whole gang setting fire to Tin-chi's building. Tin-chi barely escapes with his son Fung while being pursued by the gang and Sadi, a hired assassin. He is offered shelter at Fu's home by Julia, and works as a waiter at Gold Bar to pay his rent.

Angered by the injuries to his son, Tin-chi retaliates and sets Kit's opium den on fire. Kit's older sister, Tso Ngan Kwan, the head of a family crime syndicate wishing to transition to legal businesses, prevents Kit from taking revenge and visits Tin-chi at Gold Bar to compensate him for all damages Kit caused and for Tin-chi to drop the matter. Tin-chi refuses the money, impressing Kwan. At the same time, Tin-chi forges an increasingly close friendship with Fu over their shared pasts in martial arts.

Kit, attempting to escape from the shadow of his sister, decides to move into heroin dealing. He peddles his drugs on Bar Street for Owen Davidson, the owner of Petrus, who uses the restaurant as a front for his drug business. Tin-chi tips off Kwan about the business, who requests more time to settle the matter with Kit.

After finding Nana in a back alley, Kit and his gang kill her by forcing her to overdose on heroin. Tin-chi and Fu fight their way to the syndicate's headquarters, where they fight with Kit and Kwan. Kwan, attempting to placate them, cuts off Kit's right arm and forces him to reveal where he stores his heroin. Fu exposes the drugs to the media which makes newspaper headlines.

Soon after, Davidson has corrupt police officers plant drugs at Gold Bar and arrest Fu on drug charges. After arresting him, Wright hands Fu over to Davidson to be killed in an unfair fight. Following the discovery that Davidson murdered Fu, Tin-chi fights with Davidson at his restaurant, during which he regains his confidence in using Wing Chun for good.

Wright arrives to arrest Tin-chi despite Tin-chi's testimony that the heroin belongs to Davidson. Instead of complying, Lieutenant Fai arrests Wright for corruption and assault, and lets Tin-chi go free. Davidson attempts to escape in the ensuing chaos, but is assassinated by Sadi, who had been hired by Kwan before leaving Hong Kong with Kit.

Tin-chi returns to Julia's apartment and reunites with his son. The three of them share a meal together. In a mid-credits scene, Fung uses Wing Chun to defeat the boy who bullied him earlier.

== Cast ==
- Max Zhang as Cheung Tin-chi, a former Wing Chun master who was defeated by Ip Man in a duel behind closed doors and subsequently becomes a mercenary
- Dave Bautista as Owen Davidson, the owner of Petrus and leader of a drug smuggling syndicate
- Michelle Yeoh as Tso Ngan Kwan, the leader of the Cheung Lok organized crime syndicate who wants to turn the gang into a legitimate business entity
- Tony Jaa as Sadi the Warrior
- Liu Yan as Julia
- Xing Yu as Fu, Julia's brother and former martial artist, who now owns Gold Bar on Bar Street
- Kevin Cheng as Tso Sai Kit, younger brother of Tso Ngan Kwan. He initially runs an opium den but becomes a heroin dealer behind his sister's back on Bar Street
- Chrissie Chau as Nana, an opium addict and Julia's close friend
- Patrick Tam as Ma King-sang, a former Triad leader and martial arts disciple
- Brian Thomas Burrell as J.C. Wright, a corrupt commissioner of the Royal Hong Kong police
- Philip Keung as Fai, a lieutenant of Royal Hong Kong police
- Adam Pak as Wang Yung, an officer of Royal Hong Kong police
- Yuen Wah as Agent
- Henry Zhang as Cheung Fung, Tin-chi's son

== Home media ==
The film was released in North America on DVD and Blu-ray by Well Go USA Entertainment on 23 July 2019. In its first week of release, it sold 11,940 DVDs and 18,446 Blu-rays, with total estimated sales of $430,000.

== Reception ==
The review aggregator website Rotten Tomatoes reported that 89% of critics have given the film a positive review based on 38 reviews, with an average rating of 6.7/10. The site's critics consensus reads, "Master Z: Ip Man Legacy marks a departure from previous entries in the franchise – but its thrilling action set pieces remain every bit as satisfying." At Metacritic, the film has a weighted average score of 72 out of 100 based on 14 critics, indicating "generally favorable reviews".

Elizabeth Kerr of The Hollywood Reporter wrote, "Master Z: The Ip Man Legacy doesn't have much on its mind besides delivering on fights — and in that aspect it succeeds." Edmund Lee of South China Morning Post wrote that "Master Z is undoubtedly a feast for martial arts movie lovers", and gave the film 3.5 of 5 stars. Richard Kuipers of Variety wrote, "Despite his skimpily defined character, Zhang hits the mark as a likable guy who’s trying to put violence behind him and lay inner demons to rest."

== Sequel ==
In April 2019, it was reported that Max Zhang is set to reprise his role in a sequel to Master Z: Ip Man Legacy. The sequel is reported to be taking a budget cut, down to $13 million, from the first film's budget of $28 million.
