= Moy Yat =

Hong Kong martial arts teacher

- Born: 28 June 1938
- Died: January 23, 2001 (aged 62)
- Style: Wing Chun
- Teacher: Ip Man
- Rank: Grandmaster

Other information
- Website: http://moyyatvingtsunkungfu.com/

Moy Yat (梅逸) (June 28, 1938 – January 23, 2001) was a Hong Kong martial artist, painter, seal maker, teacher and author. He was a student of the legendary Wing Chun Kung-Fu teacher Yip Man (also romanized as Ip Man) from 1957 until Ip Man's death in 1972.

== Teaching ==
Moy Yat was a teacher of the Ving Tsun ( 詠春, also romanized as Wing Chun or Wing Tsun) style of Kung-Fu. He began teaching in Hong Kong, in 1962, at the direction of his Sifu (teacher), Ip Man. After Ip Man's death, Moy Yat moved to New York City and began teaching there until he retired from teaching at age 60. According to Inside Kung-Fu Magazine, he was "...considered among the greatest martial arts teachers of all time." He had many students, coming from all around the Tri-State Area. Some of his students include:

William Moy

Moy Yee Hop (Julian Cordero)

Miguel Hernandez of NYC Ving Tsun

Benny Meng

Leo Immamura

Anthony Dandridge

Pete Pajil

Sunny Tang

Steve Manchester

Lakis Philippou

Also see: Senior Students section.

== Published work ==
Moy Yat was the author of six books: 108 Muk Yan Jong; Wing Chun Kuen Kuit; A Legend of Kung Fu Masters; Dummy: A Tool for Kung Fu; Wing Chun Trilogy; and Luk Dim Poon Kwan. Wing Chun Kuen Kuit includes prints of Moy Yat's famous stone carvings of the history, lineage, and major principles of the Wing Chun style of Kung-Fu.

== International Recognition ==
After Moy Yat's death in 2001, William Cheung, Grandmaster of his own “Traditional Wing Chun” organization said: “The death of Moy Yat is a great loss not only to the martial art of Wing Chun, but also to the world. He was a very learned man, a good painter, poet, artist and a gentleman. This is a great loss to Chinese culture.” In recognition of the 2008 Olympic Games, and the Wushu Tournament Beijing 2008, both held in the People's Republic of China, the Chinese Government issued a series of commemorative postage stamps and a collectors album, Chinese Wushu Treasure Stamps Album, in a Limited edition of 7200 copies. The album features the greatest Wu Shu (martial art) practitioners of all time, including Moy Yat.

== Senior students ==
Out of the thousands of students he taught throughout his career, Moy Yat named his five senior students in his last published work, Luk Dim Poon Kwan : “Jeffrey Chan, Sunny Tang, Henry Moy, Lee Moy Shan, and Micky Chan.” A Directory of "Moy Yat Ving Tsun Instructors" on Grandmaster Moy Yat's website before he passed is preserved by the Internet Archive; it lists 24 direct students, as well as more grandstudent and great-grandstudent instructors.
