= Ho Kam-ming =

Macanese-born Canadian martial artist (1925–2020)

- Born: 12 December 1925; Portuguese Macau
- Died: 9 April 2020 (aged 94); Toronto, Ontario, Canada
- Native name: 何金銘
- Nationality: Canadian
- Style: Wing Chun
- Teacher: Ip Man
- Rank: Grandmaster

Other information
- Occupation: Martial arts practitioner
- Notable students: Augustine Fong, Randy Williams, Lui Ming-fai Sifu Jerome Aranas
- Notable club: World Ho Kam Ming Wing Chun Association
- Website: www.hokamming.org

Chinese name
- Traditional Chinese: 何金銘
- Simplified Chinese: 何金铭
Transcriptions
Standard Mandarin
- Hanyu Pinyin: Hé Jīnmíng
Yue: Cantonese
- Jyutping: ho^{4} gam^{1} ming^{4}

Ho Kam-ming (Chinese: 何金銘, 12 December 1925 – 9 April 2020) was a Macanese-born Canadian martial artist. He was one of the students of martial arts teacher Ip Man in the discipline of Wing Chun.

== Life ==
He was born in Macau in 1925. When he was 30, he started learning Wing Chun and became Ip Man's formal student. In Ip Ching's memoirs My Father Ip Man, Ho was described as one of Ip Man's "excellent disciples". Ho was cultivated by Ip Man, later, he inherited Ip's wish to further develop Wing Chun.

In 1960, he returned to Macau and opened the first Wing Chun school there.

He migrated to Canada in 1990. He settled in Toronto, where he founded the World Ho Kam Ming Wing Chun Association and was still active teaching. In 2011, he also started to teach Wing Chun in Zhuhai.

He was one of a handful of men to be taught the complete system from Ip Man, most of the notable Wing Chun practitioners in Macau were his students. His notable students include: Augustine Fong (Fong Chi-wing), founder of Fong's Wing Chun Gung Fu Federation; Randy Williams, founder of Close Range Combat Academy; Lui Ming-fai (雷明輝); and Master Kiet Pham, founder of Bamboo Forest Wingchun.

On 9 April 2020, Ho Kam-ming died from COVID-19 in Toronto, aged 94.
