= Lo Man-kam (martial artist) =

Chinese martial artist

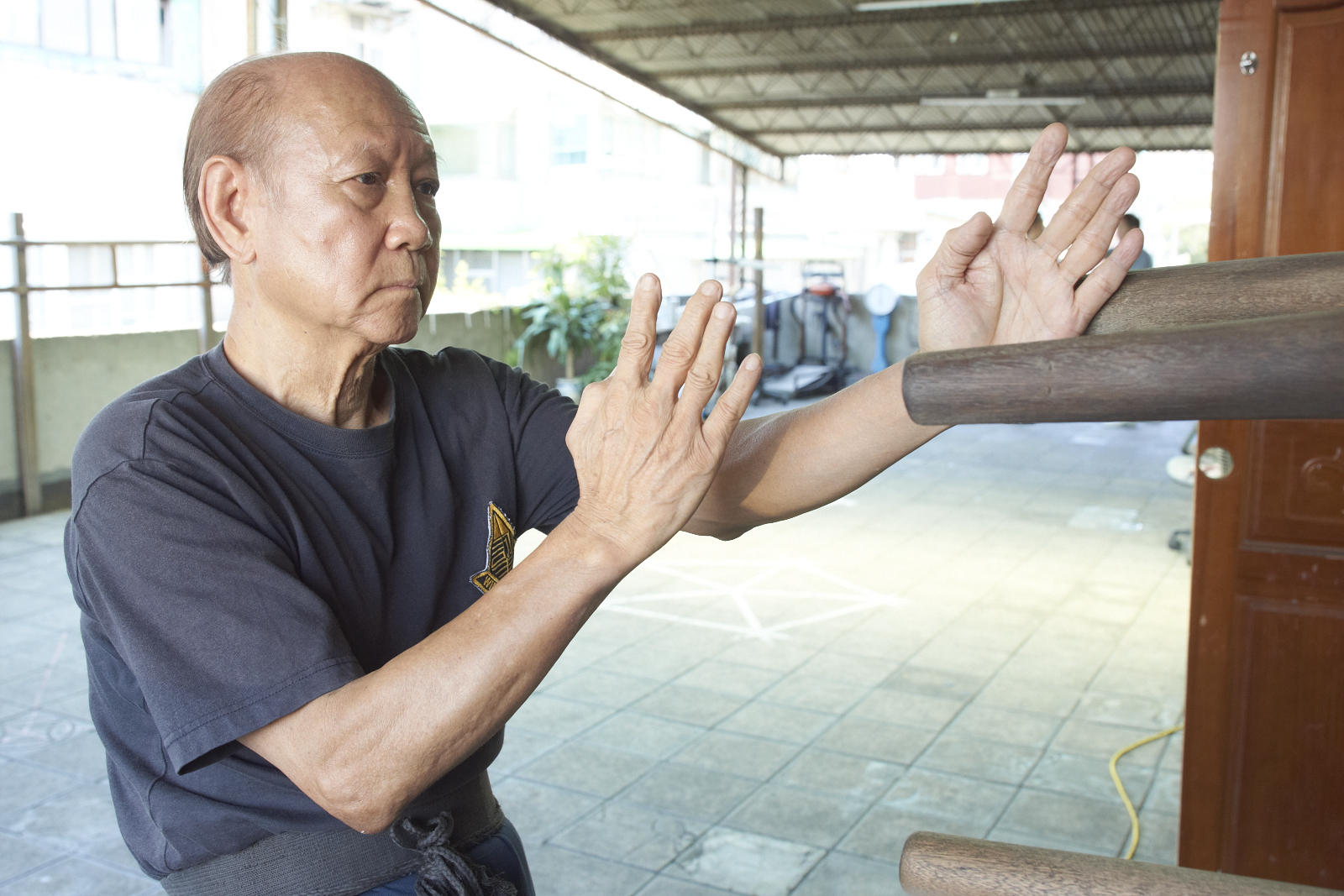
- Born: 1933 (age 92–93); Hong Kong
- Relatives: Ip Man (student)

Chinese name
- Traditional Chinese: 盧文錦
- Simplified Chinese: 卢文锦
- Hanyu Pinyin: Lú Wénjǐn
- Yale Romanization: Lòuh Màhn-gám

For the lawyer, see Lo Man Kam.

Lo Man-kam (盧文錦; born 1933) is a Hong Kong teacher of the martial art of Wing Chun.

== Early life ==
Lo was born in 1933 in Hong Kong. During the Qing dynasty in Guangdong, Foshan, members of the Lo (Lu) family were government officials, as were many of their ancestors in many generations. Thus, the Lo family lived in the housing provided to government officials which were guarded by the Qing Green Standard Army. The lobby of this Lo family residence has pair of royal plaques bestowed by Emperor of the Qing dynasty.

During the two major wars in China (the First and Second Sino-Japanese Wars), everything was destroyed. Owing to this, Lo family members temporarily stayed with the younger brother of Yip Man, Yip Ten, in his large mansion in Mulberry Garden. After the war, the Lo family moved back to Hong Kong.

== Study under Yip Man in Hong Kong ==
After Ip Man moved back to Hong Kong in 1949, he taught Wing Chun in the office of the Kowloon Hotel Union. It was at that time that Lo Man-kam started to learn from his uncle Yip Man. When Lo first started to learn Wing Chun in Hong Kong, there were only 5-7 students of Yip Man, including senior disciple Leung Sheung, Lok Yiu, Chu Shong-tin, Chan Kau, and little brother Yip (who was 13 years old at the time).

== Life and career in Taiwan ==
Lo was encouraged by Yip Man to teach in Taiwan before he moved to Taiwan in the 1960s. When Lo first moved to Taiwan, he underwent special military academy training. After graduation, Lo was appointed to work at the Ministry of National Defense in Taiwan. In 1975, he retired as a Major and opened his Wing Chun Kung Fu school in Neihu, Taipei, Taiwan. Immediately after opening the school, he had students named Daniel Duby (from Reunion) and James (from Madagascar). These students were the first foreign disciples to participate in the "Bai Si Lai" (Ceremony to honor the Sifu and to be accepted as an official disciple) in the Taiwanese wushu community.

In 1990, due to a speech given by Lo, the Taiwan Special Police Force First Corps leader Dr. Lu, who recognized the value of Lo's talent, appointed him to be a Taiwan Special Police Force instructor.

In 1992, when the Republic of China-Taiwan started its first SWAT team, Lo was appointed to be the first SWAT team head instructor.

In 1993, Dr. Lu from the Special Police Force got promoted to the principal of the Taiwan Police College. Lo then joined him at the Police College and continued teach and train future police officers and training instructors. Lo also helped the Police College by authoring the text book “Police Kung Fu”, which focuses on hand-to-hand combat techniques. This book has been translated to English and sold in the US and later translated to Russian as well.

At this time, director of Taiwan National Security Bureau had appointed Lo to teach Taiwan CIA hand-to-hand combat training, and also to write Bureau of Investigation teaching materials. Lo worked as training instructor for the Taiwan National Security Bureau 10 years. Lo also helped the Taiwan Judicial Yuan (Department) by authoring material for the Judicial police hand book and other training material, as well as serving as Taiwan Judicial Yuan training instructor.

Lo's position at the Police College, beginning with the term of Principle Dr. Lu, and continuing through the term of 5 other principals, lasted 18 years. Every now and then, he is invited back to give special training lessons.

== Students and legacy ==
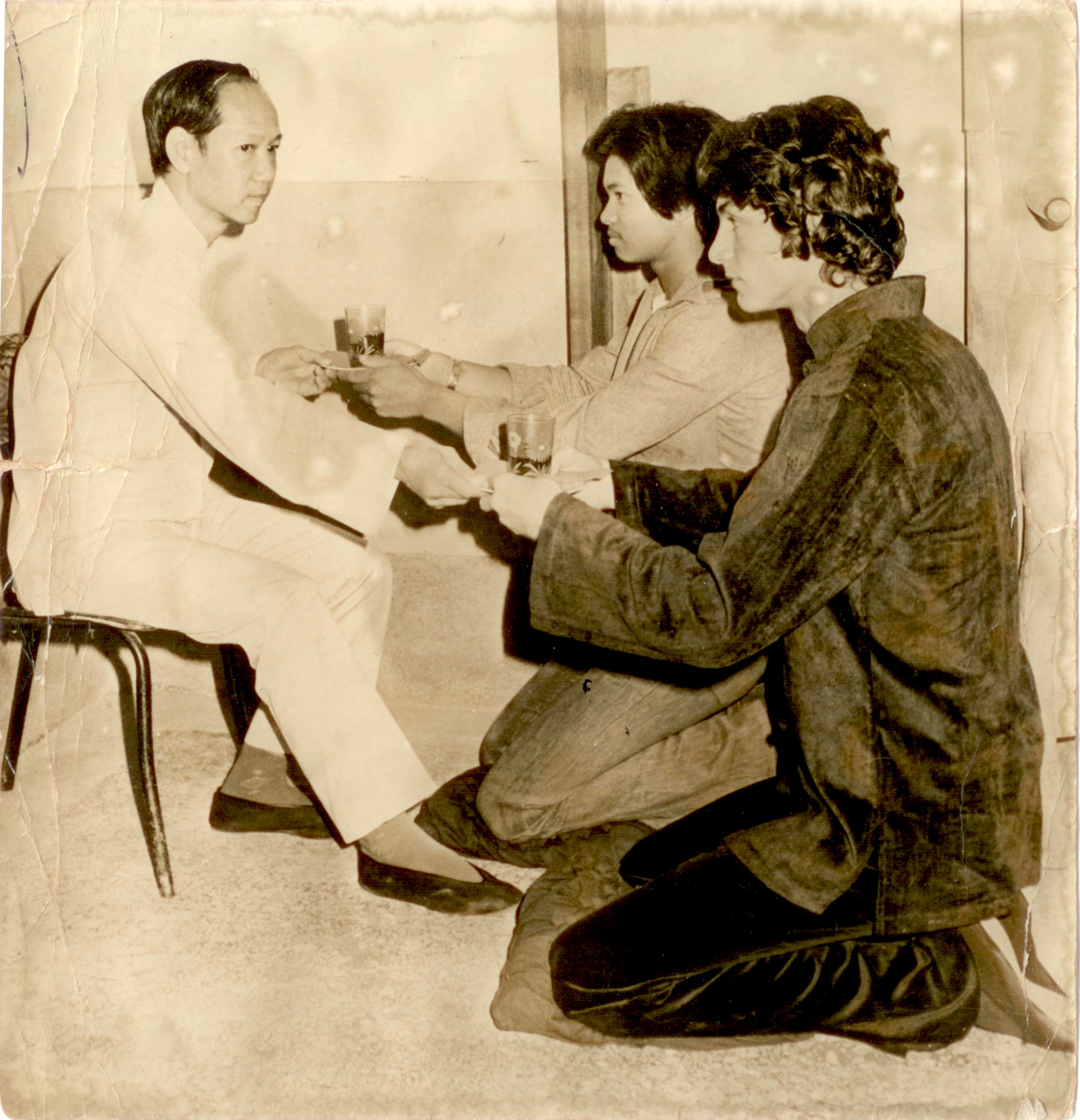
Lo with his first foreign students, in 1975

In terms of family legacy of Wing Chun Kung Fu, Lo's son Gorden Lu, has been teaching Wing Chun in Virginia Beach in the United States for more than 10 years.

Students of Lo from many parts of the world such as Europe, New Zealand, Australia, the US and many other countries have come all the way to Taiwan to enter the door of the Lo Man-kam Wing Chun Kung Fu family.

Many of Lo's students have themselves become Sifu, and are teaching the 3rd generation of students in the Lo Man-kam lineage. The Lo Man-kam Wing Chun Kung Fu Federation has students and schools in more than 40 countries, in Europe, North and South America, Asia, Africa and Australia.

Also Lo lead the Federation in Taiwan and created many Associations in other countries. The European countries and their Associations found the European Association as their common leadership. Lo son Gorden Lu is the president and Los long time student Marc Debus is vicepresident of that organisation.
