= Cheung Wing-sing =

Wife of Wing Chun master Ip Man (1897–1960)

- 張永成
- Born: 1897; Foshan, Guangdong, Qing Empire
- Died: 1960 (aged 62–63); Foshan, Guangdong, China
- Spouse: Ip Man (m. 1916)
- Children: Ip Chun (son); Ip Ching (son); Ip Nga-sum (daughter); Ip Nga-wun (daughter)

Chinese name
- Traditional Chinese: 張永成
- Simplified Chinese: 张永成
Transcriptions
Standard Mandarin
- Hanyu Pinyin: Zhāng Yǒngchéng
Yue: Cantonese
- Yale Romanization: jēung wíhng sìhng
- Jyutping: zoeng1 wing5 sing4

Cheung Wing-sing (simplified Chinese: 张永成; traditional Chinese: 張永成; pinyin: Zhāng Yǒngchéng; 1897 – 1960) was the wife of Wing Chun master Ip Man. She died from cancer.

== Biography ==
Little is known about Cheung's birth and childhood life except that she was a relative of the Qing Dynasty official Zhang Yinhuan (張蔭桓) (1837–1900), who was involved in the Hundred Days' Reform movement in 1898, and that she was born to educated parents in Foshan.

In 1916 she was married to Ip Man in Foshan and they had four children: sons Ip Chun (葉準) and Ip Ching (葉正) and daughters Ip Nga-sum (葉雅心) and Ip Nga-wun (葉雅媛).

According to her son Ip Chun, she and Ip had never quarreled. Cheung herself was a traditional Chinese woman who was solemn, supportive, and tolerant of her husband.

After the Communist victory in the civil war, Cheung, her husband Ip, and their elder daughter Nga-sum left Foshan for Hong Kong in 1950. Soon after they arrived at Hong Kong through Macau, Cheung and her son returned to Foshan to retrieve their identity cards. However the closure of borders between China and Hong Kong was established in 1951, and Cheung was separated from her husband for good. Unable to go to Hong Kong, she remained in Foshan where she died of cancer in 1960, while her children would eventually be reunited with their father in Hong Kong in the 1960s.

Her daughters would eventually marry; one to a husband with the surname of Ng (伍), another to a husband with the surname of Ng (吳), but with a different pronunciation.

== In popular culture ==
She was first portrayed in the first three installments of the Ip Man film series — Ip Man (2008), Ip Man 2 (2010) and Ip Man 3 (2015) — by Lynn Hung.

In the 2010 film The Legend Is Born: Ip Man, she was portrayed by Huang Yi.

In the 2013 film The Grandmaster, she was portrayed by Song Hye-kyo.

In the 2013 television series Ip Man, she was portrayed by Han Xue.

In the 2013 film Ip Man: The Final Fight, she was portrayed by Anita Yuen.

In the 2019 film Ip Man: Kung Fu Master, she was portrayed by Chang Qinyuan.
