= The Legend Is Born: Ip Man =

2010 Hong Kong film by Herman Yau

- Original Hong Kong film poster

Chinese name
- Traditional Chinese: 葉問前傳
- Simplified Chinese: 叶问前传
Transcriptions
Standard Mandarin
- Hanyu Pinyin: Yè Wèn Qiánzhuàn
Yue: Cantonese
- Jyutping: Jip6 Man6 Cin4-zyun6
- Directed by: Herman Yau
- Written by: Erica Li
- Produced by: Sin Kwok-lam
- Starring: Dennis To; Sammo Hung; Yuen Biao; Louis Fan; Huang Yi
- Cinematography: Joe Chan Kwong-Hung
- Edited by: Azrael Chung
- Music by: Mak Chun Hung
- Production company: Mei Ah Entertainment
- Distributed by: Cathay-Keris Films; Universe Laser & Video Co. Ltd. (Hong Kong); Funimation Entertainment (USA)
- Release date: 24 June 2010
- Running time: 100 minutes
- Country: Hong Kong
- Language: Cantonese

The Legend Is Born: Ip Man (Chinese: 葉問前傳) is a 2010 Hong Kong biographical martial arts film based on the early life of the Wing Chun grandmaster Ip Man, directed by Herman Yau and starring Dennis To in the title role. The film was followed by a sequel in 2013, Ip Man: The Final Fight. Though not made in collaboration with Wilson Yip's Ip Man or Ip Man 2, The Legend is Born features several actors who appeared in Yip's films, including Sammo Hung, Louis Fan, and Chen Zhihui. The film also features a special appearance by Ip Chun, the son of Ip Man. It was released as Ip Man Zero in German and Dutch-speaking areas.

== Plot ==
As a child, Ip Man learns Wing Chun from Chan Wah-shun together with his adopted brother Ip Tin-chi and their mutual friend Lee Mei-wai, who later develops unrequited feelings for Ip while Tin-chi develops unrequited feelings for Mei-wai. After Chan's death from an illness, Ip Man continues to learn Wing Chun from his senior, Ng Chung-sok, before eventually leaving Foshan to study in Hong Kong.

In Hong Kong, after a field hockey match, Ip and his schoolmates are racially insulted by a Westerner, which Ip takes offence to. When the Westerner slurs them in Chinese, a further incensed Ip challenges him to a fight and proceeds to defeat him soundly. Following the incident, Ip's notoriety and popularity skyrocket. While getting medicine to treat the Westerner, who he now refers to as a friend, he meets master Leung Bik, who is actually the son of Leung Jan, Chan Wah-shun's teacher. Over the course of his time in Hong Kong, Ip Man learns a more varied and improved style of Wing Chun from Bik that differs greatly from Chan Wah-shun's orthodox style, and his martial arts prowess improves tremendously. Meanwhile, in Foshan, Ip Tin-chi rises to become a prominent businessman under another Wing Chun martial arts association, and Japanese businessmen arrive in Hong Kong.

Ip returns to Foshan after five years away and reunites with his peers. Believing that Ip has disrespected the memory of Chan Wah-shun by deviating from traditional Wing Chun techniques, an angry Chung-sok attacks him; not wishing to hurt his senior, Ip deliberately loses their fight, and their relationship becomes greatly strained as a result. Ip also later falls in love with Cheung Wing-sing, the daughter of the vice-mayor of Foshan. When Mei-wai realises that Ip Man loves Cheung, she accepts Ip Tin-chi's love for her. On their wedding night, her godfather is murdered and Ip is arrested as a prime suspect after being witnessed struggling with him; Cheung lies that Ip was with her the entire evening in order to have him released from jail. Mei-wai later discovers a letter to Tin-chi, revealing his involvement in the murder of her godfather, and informs Chung-sok. Attempting suicide, she is saved by Tin-chi, and they try to leave Foshan but are stopped by the Japanese. Mei-wai is captured and Tin-chi is ordered to kill Ng Chung-sok due to his knowledge of the letter; they also threaten to kill Mei-wai to ensure Tin-chi's co-operation.

At the martial arts association, Ng Chung-sok is defeated by Ip Tin-chi and the Japanese. Ip arrives in time to save Ng Chung-sok from being killed and then subsequently defeats the Japanese and Tin-chi. Tin-chi then reveals that he is actually a Japanese sergeant named Tanaka Eiketsu, and that was sent to China to infiltrate and work as an undercover agent. Ip then rushes off to the pier to rescue Lee. He defeats the Japanese and rescues Mei-wai, who tearfully reveals that she has miscarried Tin-chi's child; meanwhile, Tin-chi performs seppuku to end his life. At the pier, they discover that the Japanese have been smuggling Japanese children to China, possibly as future undercover agents, similar to Tin-chi.

Ng Chung-sok is seen narrating the story of the night to new apprentices at the martial arts association. Ip's son, Ip Chun, is seen among the new apprentices. Ip Man arrives back at the association and is shown married to Cheung.

== Awards and nominations ==
- Winner of the China Movie Channel Media Awards for Best Male Supporting Role to Ip Chun at Shanghai International Film Festival 2010.
- Nominated at the China Movie Channel Media Awards for Best New Actor to Ip Chun at Shanghai International Film Festival 2010.

== Cast ==
- Dennis To as Ip Man
- Louis Fan as Ip Tin-chi / Tanaka Eiketsu, Ip Man's oath brother
- Huang Yi as Cheung Wing-sing, Ip Man's love interest
- Rose Chan Ka-Wun as Lee Mei-wai, Ip Man's junior.
- Wen Junhui as young Ip Man
- Xu Jiao as the younger Lee.
- Ip Chun as Leung Bik, Ip Man's sisuk
- Sammo Hung as Chan Wah-shun, Ip Man's sifu / Austin Yuan
- Hins Cheung as Cho, Ip Man's love rival
- Yuen Biao as Ng Chung-sok, Ip Man's senior master.
- Lam Suet as Cheung Ho-tin, the vice-mayor of Foshan and father of Cheung Wing-sing
- Sire Ma as Cheung Wing-wah, Cheung Wing-sing's younger sister
- Bernice Liu as Kitano Yumi
- Chen Zhihui as Ip Man's father
- Kenny Kwan
- Andy Taylor as foreign challenger at the field hockey match

== Controversy ==
Sin Kwok-lam (Ip Man's son's student and producer) apologized and served tea to Yuen Jo Tong for misrepresenting his grandfather Yuen Kay Shan's reputation and status in Wing Chun history. (In the movie, Yuen Kay Shan was portrayed as Ip Man's younger kung fu brother, not as skillful as Ip Man). This had the Yuen and Yiu families criticize the movie in interviews. After the Yuen and Yiu families voiced their displeasure about Yuen Kay Shan's portrayal in the movie on Ip Man, movie producer Si Kwok Lam and co-producer Ip Chun apologized six times and "served tea" to Yuen Kay San's grandson, Yuen Jo Tong, for misrepresenting, and being disrespectful to, the legendary 1000 death duel champion during the 1920-1950s, Yuen Kay Shan.

== Production ==
The Legend is Born: Ip Man was shot in Foshan.

== Release ==
The film was released in Hong Kong on 24 June 2010.

== Home media ==
=== VCD ===
Release date	Country	Classifaction	Publisher	Format	Language	Subtitles	Notes	REF
26 August 2010	Hong Kong	N/A	Universal Studio	NTSC	Cantonese, Mandarin	English, Traditional Chinese	2VCDs	

=== DVD ===
Release date	Country	Classifaction	Publisher	Format	Region	Language	Sound	Subtitles	Notes	REF
26 August 2010	Hong Kong	N/A	Universal Studio	NTSC	ALL	Cantonese, Mandarin	6.1, Dolby Digital EX(** "TM") / THX Surround EX(** "TM"), DTS Extended Surround(** "TM") / DTS-ES(** "TM")	English, Traditional Chinese, Simplified Chinese		
13 October 2010	Taiwan	N/A		NTSC	ALL	Cantonese, Mandarin	Dolby Digital 2.0, Dolby Digital 5.1, Dolby Digital EX(** "TM") / THX Surround EX(** "TM")	English, Traditional Chinese, Simplified Chinese		
20 December 2010	United Kingdom	N/A	Metrodome Group (UK)	PAL	2	Cantonese, Mandarin		English		
13 December 2011	United States	N/A	Funimation	NTSC	1	Cantonese, English		English		

=== Blu-ray Disc ===
Release date	Country	Classifaction	Publisher	Format	Region	Language	Sound	Subtitles	Notes	REF
26 August 2010	Hong Kong	N/A	Universal Studio		All	Cantonese, Mandarin	DTS-HD Master Audio 7.1, Dolby Digital 5.1 EX, Dolby Digital 5.1 EX	Traditional Chinese, English		
13 October 2010	Taiwan	N/A	TBA		All	Cantonese, Mandarin	7.1, Dolby Digital 2.0, DTS-HD Master Audio, Dolby Digital 5.1, Dolby Digital EX(** "TM") / THX Surround EX(** "TM")	English, Traditional Chinese, Simplified Chinese		
28 January 2011	Germany	N/A	Splendid Entertainment		B	Cantonese, German (Dubbed)	DTS-HD HR 5.1	German, Dutch	Released under the title "IP Man Zero"	
13 December 2011	United States	N/A	Funimation	NTSC (DVD)	A	Cantonese, English (Dubbed)	TBA	English	Blu-ray + DVD combo	
13 December 2011	Canada	N/A	Vivendi Visual Entertainment	NTSC (DVD)	A	Cantonese, English (Dubbed)	TBA	English	Blu-ray + DVD combo	
