= Leung Ting =

Hong Kong martial artist, publisher, choreographer, screenwriter, director and actor

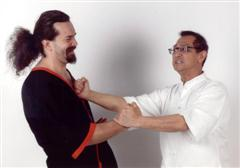
- Leung Ting (right), with one of his students
- Born: 28 February 1947 (age 79); British Hong Kong
- Native name: 梁挺
- Style: Wing Chun
- Teachers: Leung Sheung; Yip Man

Other information
- Occupation: martial artist, publisher, choreographer, screenwriter, director, former actor
- Notable club: International WingTsun Association
- Website: www.leungting.com

Leung Ting (Chinese: 梁挺; born 28 February 1947) is a Hong Kong martial artist, publisher, choreographer, screenwriter, director, and former actor. He is the last direct 'closed-door' disciple of Grandmaster Yip Man, and one of Yip's most significant students by popularising Wing Tsun throughout Europe and mainstream networks since the mid-1970s.

Leung Ting is also the founder of International WingTsun Association and has been invited to over 50 countries and regions including mainland China, UK, America, Germany, Italy, Hungary, Greece, Czech and India for military training and private teaching. He garnered fame from spreading his WingTsun Kungfu system globally since the 1970s.

== Background ==
Born in Hong Kong in 1947, Leung began studying Wing Tsun aged 13 from Leung Sheung, Yip Man's most senior disciple in Hong Kong, then later directly under Grandmaster Yip Man.

Appointed by Yip Man, Leung served as head instructor on the board of directors for the Ving Tsun Athletic Association between Dec 1969 to May 1970. When the Ving Tsun Athletic Association moved from its former premises of 438 Nathan Road, Yau Ma Tei, Leung Ting remained at the location to found his own Wing Tsun Gymnasium (1970) and later Association (1973).

Leung Ting is the founder and president of the International WingTsun Association (IWTA) and developed a structured and standardised Wing Tsun teaching & grading system known as the Leung Ting Wing Tsun system. Leung chose the spelling of Wing Tsun to differentiate his teachings from those of other Wing Chun schools, and to keep them from passing off their style as his own. (There is no standard romanization of Cantonese; the Chinese characters remain the same.)

He achieved prominence by spreading Wing Tsun and Chinese kung fu culture internationally since the 1970s.

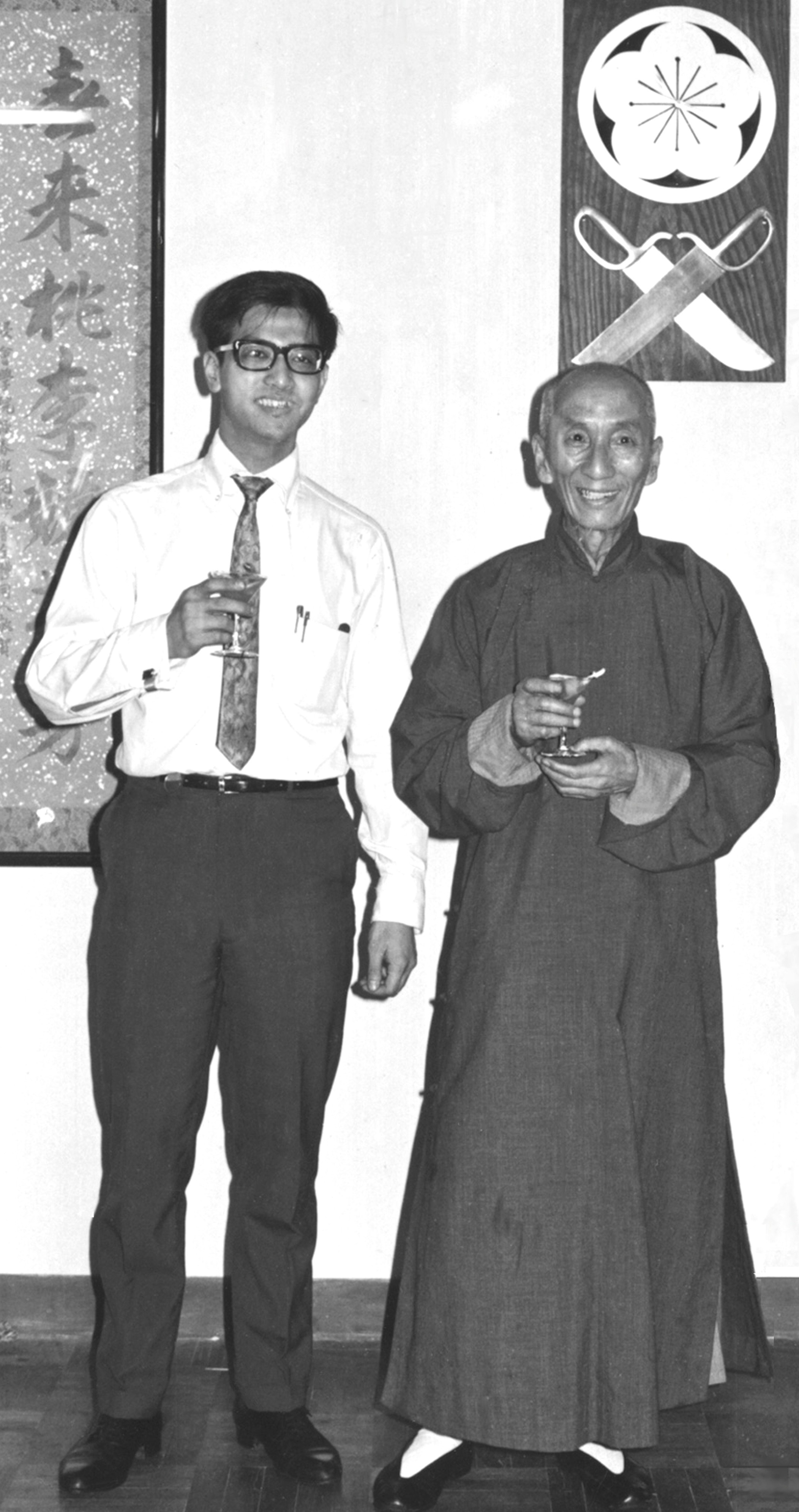
Yip Man at the Inauguration of the Leung Ting Wing Tsun gymnasium HK, May 1970

Among the achievements in his career outside of teaching and writing about Wing Tsun, Leung has made significant contribution to Hong Kong Kungfu film industry by serving as fight director of famous Kungfu movies such as Five Deadly Venoms (1978). Also, he was the director and screenwriter for It's a Mad, Mad, Mad Kung Fu World! (大踢爆), a humoristic documentary on the history and culture of kung fu. Leung appeared on episode 1 of the first season of the BBC show Mind, Body & Kick Ass Moves; a 10 part series on martial arts masters of the east hosted by Chris Crudelli.

=== Filmography ===
- Producer and host: Real Kung Fu (真功夫) (1976) - a 24-episode martial art TV program by Rediffusion Television
- Fight choreographer: Stranger from Shaolin (1977)
- Fight choreographer: Five Deadly Venoms (1978) distributed by Shaw brothers Studious
- Fight choreographer: The Brave Archer Part II (1978) distributed by Shaw brothers Studious
- Fight choreographer: Invincible Shaolin (1978) distributed by Shaw brothers Studious
- Fight choreographer: Ten Tigers of Kwangtung (1979) distributed by Shaw brothers Studious
- Fight choreographer: Life Gamble (1979) distributed by Shaw brothers Studious
- Fight choreographer: Heaven and Hell (1980) distributed by Shaw brothers Studious
- Director and screenwriter: It's a Mad, Mad, Mad Kung Fu World! (大踢爆) (2000)

== Career ==
In 1968, he was admitted to the Department of Foreign Languages and Literature of Hong Kong Baptist College, majoring in Chinese Language and Literature. In the same year, Yip Man accepted Leung as his closed-door disciple. Leung opened a WingTsun martial art class at Baptist College, becoming the first person to introduce Chinese martial arts to a Hong Kong tertiary institution. Before this, there was never a kungfu class in any academic institute. It was a pioneering achievement because kungfu was seen as a low-class activity.

Leung Ting is the founder and president of the International WingTsun Association (IWTA). He achieved prominence by spreading Wing Tsun and Chinese kung fu culture internationally since the 1970s through his association, the IWTA, which had an estimated 3000 instructor branches across 65 countries during the mid-1990s; leading the media to call him ‘Wing Tsun King’ and ‘Genghis Khan of the Chinese Martial Arts Community’.

Leung chose the spelling of Wing Tsun to differentiate his teachings from those of other Wing Chun schools, and to keep them from passing off their style as his own. (There is no standard romanization of Cantonese; the Chinese characters remain the same.)

Leung Ting has authored over 100 books, videos, and magazines on the topic of Wing Tsun and martial arts. For example, his seminal book, Wing Tsun Kuen (1978) has been translated into most major international languages, and as of 2012 was on its 23rd edition. His book Roots & Branches of Wing Tsun (2000) is amongst the earliest publications on the history of Wing Tsun Kungfu.

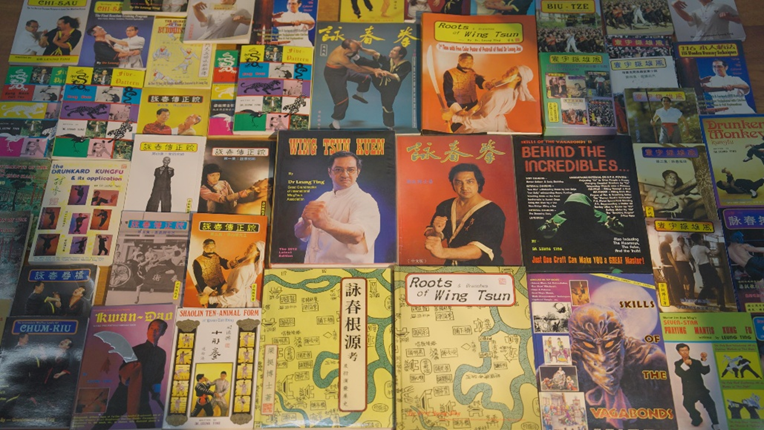
GM Leung Ting has authored over 100 books, videos, and magazines on the topic of Wing Tsun and martial arts

English books

1. Wing Tsun Kuen (1978)
2. Roots and Branches of Wing Tsun (2000)
3. Dynamic Wing Tsun Kungfu (1985)
4. 116 Wooden Dummy Techniques by Dr. Leung Ting (2010)
5. 116 Wing Tsun Dummy Techniques by Master Yip Chun & Dr. Leung Ting (1981)
6. Siu-Nim-Tau (2002)
7. Chum Kiu (2002)
8. Biu-Tze (2003)
9. Chi-Sau (2006)
10. Chi-Sau II & Lat-Sau (2006)
11. Chi-Sau III & IV (2008)
12. Chi-Sau V-VII (2010)
13. Seven-Star Praying Mantis Kungfu (1980)
14. Five-Pattern Hung Kuen Part 1 (1980)
15. Five-Pattern Hung Kuen part 2 (1981)
16. Dragon-Tiger Double broadsword Style (1982)
17. Skills of the Vagabonds (1983)
18. Behind The Incredibles - Skills of the Vagabonds II (1991)
19. The Drunkard Kungfu & its application (1984)
20. 108 Movements of the Shaolin Wooden-Men Hall Part #1 (1984)
21. 108 Movements of the Shaolin Wooden-Men Hall Part #2 (1984)
22. Kwan Dao (1984)
23. Drunken Monkey Kungfu (1986)
24. Ferocious Enchanted-Staff of the Ancient Monks (1986)
25. Shaolin Ten-Animal Form of Kwan Tak Hing (1987)

Chinese books

1. Wing Tsun Kuen Part #1 (1982)
2. Wing Tsun Kuen Part #2 (1982)
3. Five-Pattern Hung Kuen part 1 (1984)
4. Five-Pattern Hung Kuen part 2 (1984)
5. Self-teaching - Dynamic Wing Tsun Kungfu (1992)
6. Siu-Nim-Tau (2001)
7. Chum-Kiu (2001)
8. Biu-Tze (2002)
9. Leung Ting Stories (Novels #1 - #5) (2007)
10. WingTsun Stories (Novels #1 - #5) (2000)
11. Roots and Branches of WingTsun (2006)
12. Skills of the Vagabonds (1985)

== Relationship and photos with Yip Man ==
Introduction to Yip Man

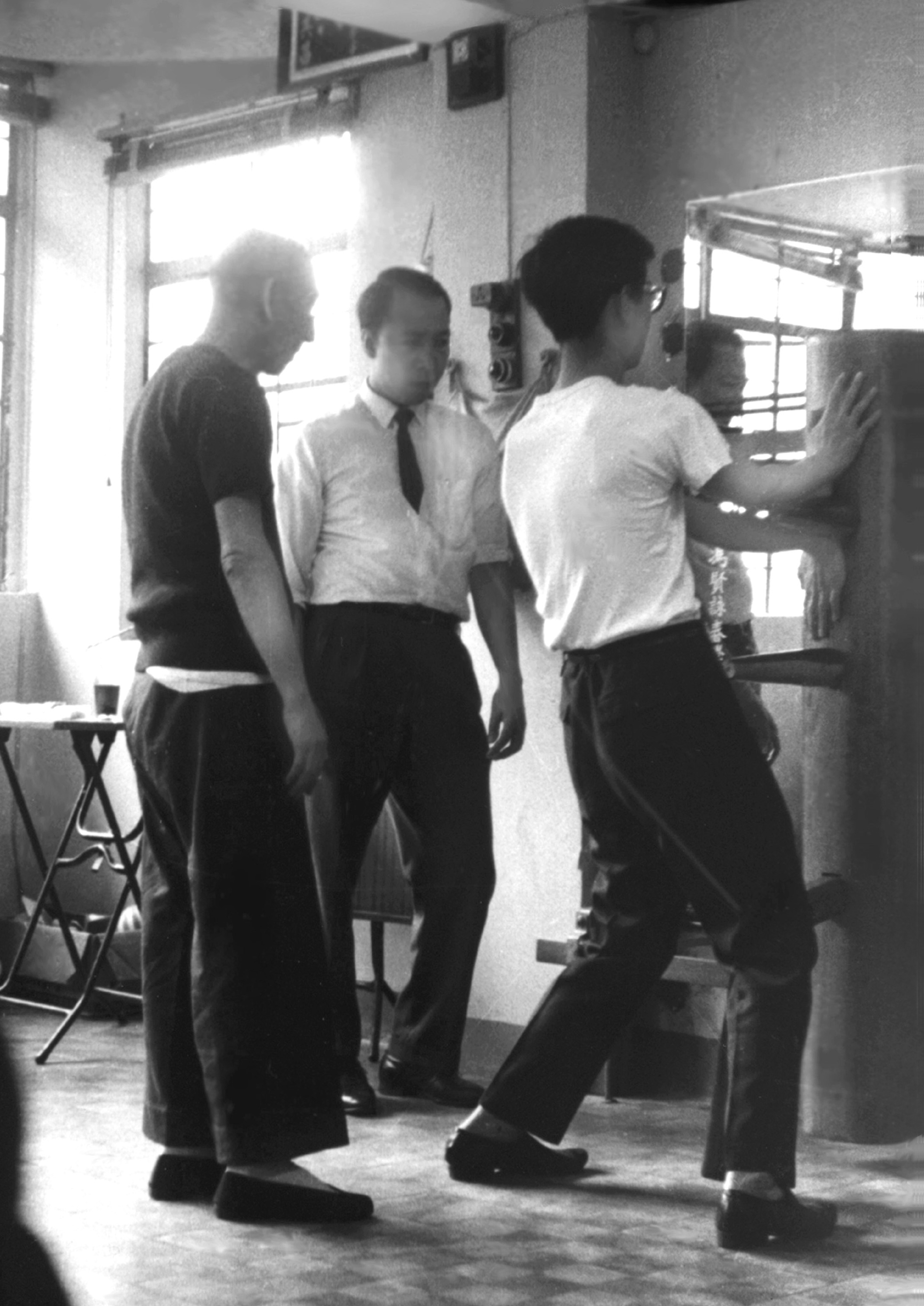
Yip Man & Leung Ting - Private training in Kwok Keung's home in the 1960s

Leung Ting began studying Wing Tsun under Leung Sheung, one of Yip Man’s most senior students in Hong Kong at age 13. He was later introduced to Yip Man by Kwok Keung, his senior second elder kung fu brother, another disciple of Grandmaster Yip Man, and was accepted as Yip’s last 'closed-door' disciple in the late 60s following Leung's growing reputation within martial art circle.

Private instruction

Multiple photographs taken at Kwok Keung's house captured Leung Ting receiving private instruction on the advanced Wing Tsun form, the wooden dummy, as a 'closed-door' student from Yip Man in the late 1960s. Photographs have been verified in interviews by Kwok Keung, another senior disciple of Yip Man.

Martial art demonstration in HKBU

In November 1969, while a student at Hong Kong Baptist College, Leung Ting organized a Chinese Kungfu show that featured his grandmaster, Yip Man, as a VIP guest alongside prominent masters of other martial arts—marking the single documented instance of Yip Man attending a kung fu exhibition organized by his own students.

Ving Tsun Athletic Association (VTAA)

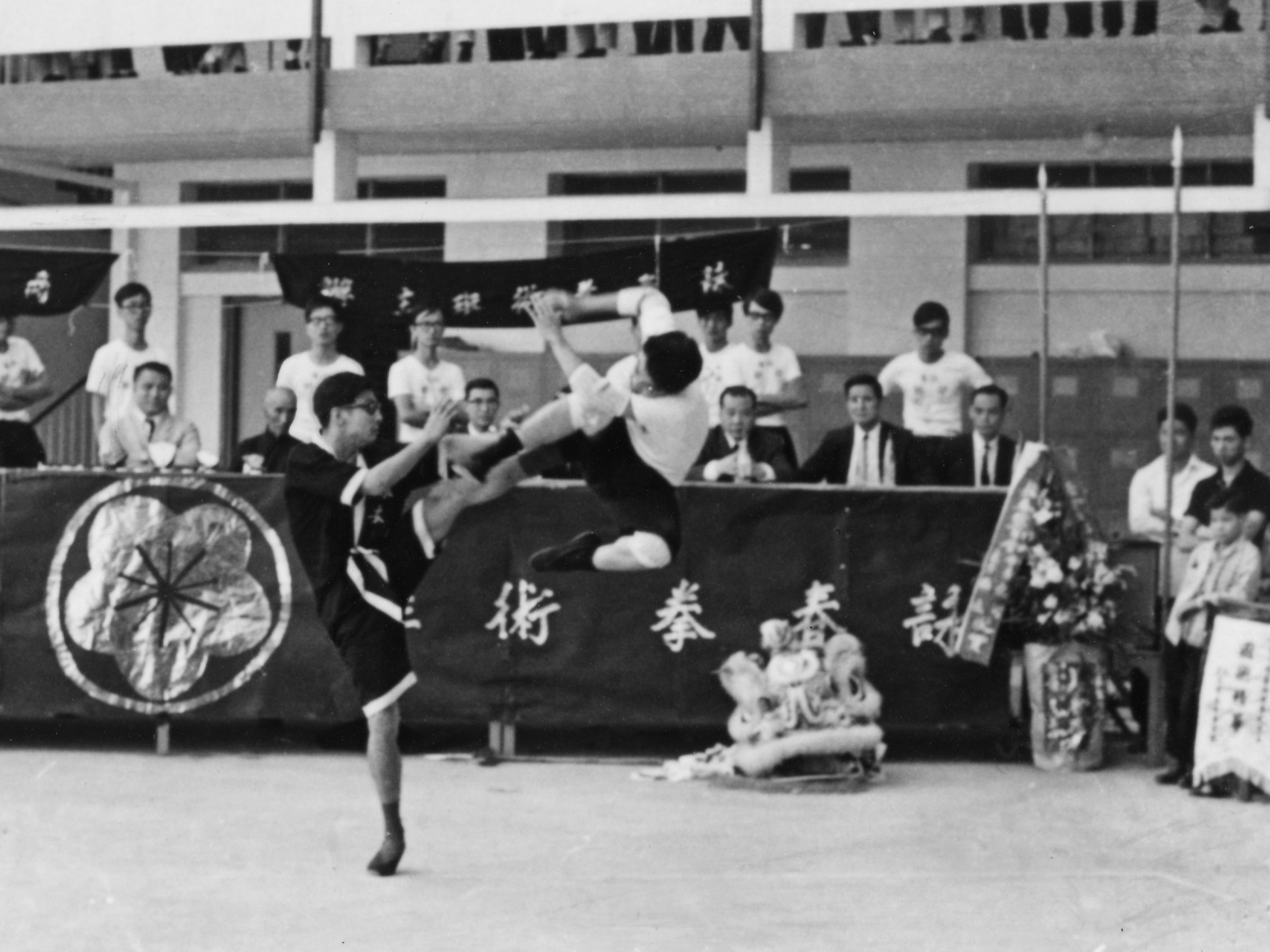
Yip Man sat behind table (2nd sitting from left to right) as Leung Ting performed a high frontal kick - Nov 1969 Baptist College

Appointed by Yip Man, Leung Ting served as head instructor and member of the board of directors for the Ving Tsun Athletic Association (VTAA), co-founded by Yip Man, between Dec 1969 and May 1970.

When the VTAA relocated to 3 Nullah Road in Mong Kok in 1970, Leung Ting remained at the former premises at 438 Nathan Road, Yau Ma Tei, establishing it as his own independent gymnasium.

Gym Opening

In May 1970, Leung Ting opened his own Wing Tsun Martial Arts Gymnasium in Yau Ma Tei, Hong Kong, with Yip Man in attendance to congratulate his disciple.

Wedding ceremony

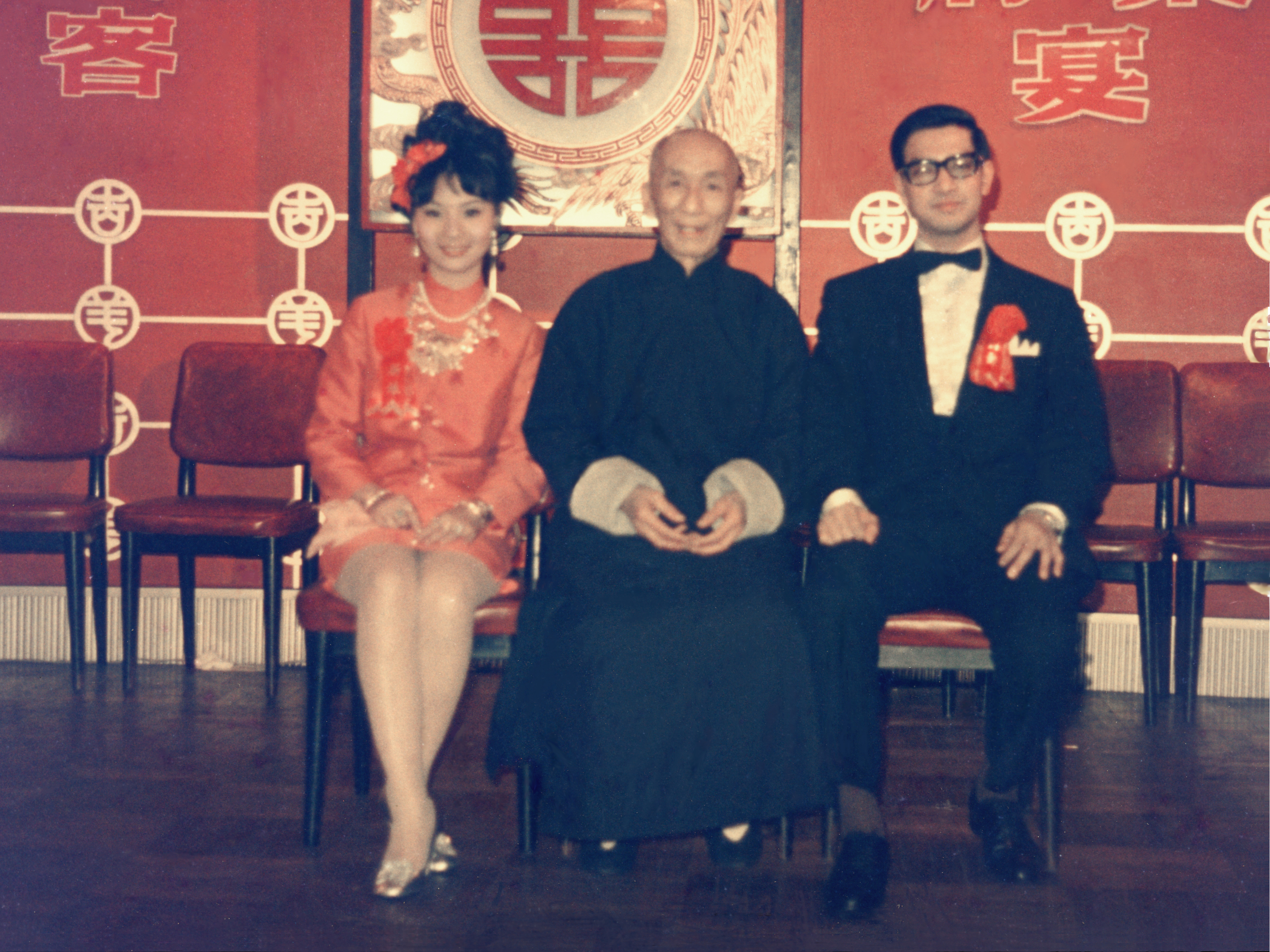
Yip Man attending Leung Ting's wedding feast in March 1970

Photographs from Leung Ting's wedding document Yip Man's attendance as a VIP guest in March 1970, along with senior disciples of Yip.

Magazine Interview

In one of only two recorded interviews conducted before Yip Man's passing, Leung Ting was mentioned by Yip Man as one of his 'closed-door' disciples in New Martial Hero magazine -「教師梁挺係其一位封門弟子」('Instructor Leung Ting is a 'closed-door' disciple') - quoted from New Martial Hero magazine 1972, copy 56, page 31, paragraph 2, line 5. Photos from the interview show Leung was with Yip Man during the time.

== Lineage controversy ==
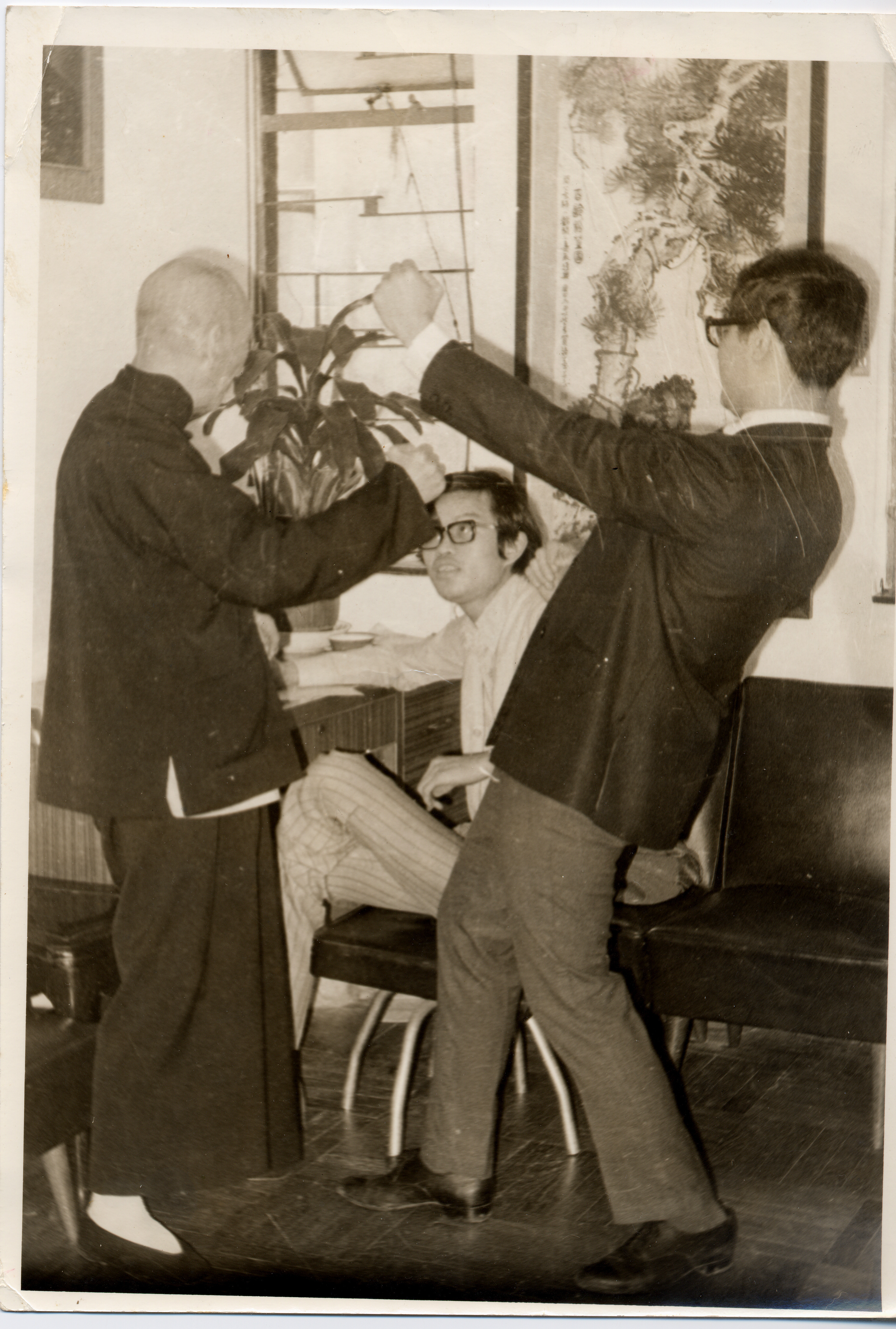
1972 New Martial Hero GGM Yip Man with Leung Ting

Some of Yip Man's students, most notably including his eldest son, Yip Chun, and William Cheung have questioned if Leung could be considered a student of Yip Man. Yip Chun, who co-authored the 1981 book 116 Wing Tsun Dummy Techniques with Leung, has publicly stated that his father held a strong dislike for Leung and did not consider him a student. Specifically, Yip Chun stated, '我老豆最憎最嬲係梁挺呢個人!' ('My father dislike this person Leung Ting the most!') and claimed '唔係葉問徒弟' ('He is not Yip Man's student').

Addressing the public disputes and claims, Leung held a public press conference in Hong Kong in May 2010 with notable figures of the Hong Kong Martial arts community to present evidence in support of his training history, including:

- Photographic Documentation: Unedited photographs showing Leung Ting alongside Yip Man at private lessons, public martial arts demonstrations, his own wedding, and during the grandmaster's final media interviews.
- Media and Publication Records: The 1972 feature in New Martial Hero magazine (Issue #56, page 31), identified Leung Ting as a 'closed-door' disciple (封門弟子) during an interview with Yip Man; photographs from that interview show was Leung present alongside the grandmaster.

During the press conference Leung publicly threatened a defamation and slander lawsuit unless he received a public apology. Yip Chun has since remained silent on this matter.

The controversy was further fuelled by allegations that Leung altered a photograph with Yip Man to replace the New Martial Hero editor— which Leung denied claiming that the editor of New Martial Hero had pasted his own head over Leung's for the article.

Evidence from Leung shows the original to be uncropped and at a higher resolution to the magazine's published photo.

Critics have also cited a funeral armband worn by Leung during Yip's funeral as suggesting a second generation rank, though the broader photographic and print record continues to be cited as primary evidence of his direct training under Yip Man.
