= Victor Kan =

Hong Kong wing chun practitioner

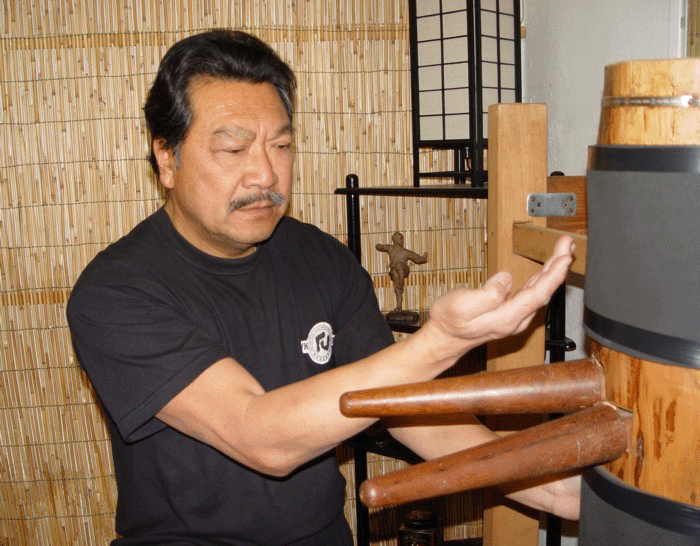
- Born: Kan Wah-chit; 1941 (age 84–85)
- Native name: 簡華捷
- Style: Wing Chun
- Teacher: Ip Man
- Rank: Grandmaster

Other information
- Website: http://www.victorkanvt.com

Victor Kan (簡華捷, Kan Wah-chit; born 1941) is a student of the late Ip Man and began his Wing Chun instruction at the age of 13 years in Hong Kong. He was with Yip Man for 7 years and in that time during which he became known as the 'King of Chi Sao' or 'The Untouchable'. By the late 1950s he assisted Yip Man until he left for Europe in 1961. He teaches in the UK and has been doing so since 1975. He also has branches in Italy, Australia and Hong Kong.

== Bruce Lee ==
Is reputed to have taught Bruce Lee the first section of the Siu Nim Tao form.
