= Ip Man: The Final Fight =

2013 Hong Kong film by Herman Yau

- Film poster

Chinese name
- Traditional Chinese: 葉問：終極一戰
- Simplified Chinese: 叶问：终极一战
Transcriptions
Standard Mandarin
- Hanyu Pinyin: Yè Wèn: Zhōngjí Yī Zhàn
Yue: Cantonese
- Jyutping: Jip6 Man6: Zung1-gik6 Jat1 Zin3
- Directed by: Herman Yau
- Screenplay by: Erica Li
- Story by: Checkley Sin
- Produced by: Checkley Sin; Albert Lee; Cherry Law; Catherine Hun
- Starring: Anthony Wong; Anita Yuen; Jordan Chan; Eric Tsang; Gillian Chung
- Cinematography: Joe Chan
- Edited by: Azrael Chung
- Music by: Mak Chun Hung
- Production companies: Golden Harvest; Pegasus Taihe Entertainment
- Distributed by: Lark Films Distribution
- Release date: 28 March 2013
- Running time: 102 minutes
- Country: Hong Kong
- Language: Cantonese
- Box office: HK$8,494,894

Ip Man: The Final Fight is a 2013 Hong Kong biographical martial arts film directed by Herman Yau, starring Anthony Wong, Anita Yuen, Jordan Chan, Eric Tsang and Gillian Chung. It is based on the life of the Wing Chun grandmaster Ip Man. This film is the sequel of The Legend Is Born: Ip Man but has no connection to the earlier Ip Man films, such as Wilson Yip's Ip Man series and Wong Kar-wai's The Grandmaster.

== Plot ==
In 1949, Ip Man, who has been suffering from chronic gastric pain, travels alone to Hong Kong. He starts teaching Wing Chun on the rooftop of a building which houses a hotel staff's general association. He meets and accepts new students, including Tang Shing, Leung Sheung, Wong Tung, Lee King and Chan Sei-mui. During that period of time, Ip Man's wife, Cheung Wing-sing, also comes to Hong Kong to join her husband, but returns to Foshan shortly after because life in Hong Kong is hard. The couple never saw each other again because Cheung died not long after returning to Foshan. His son Ip Chun comes from Foshan to Hong Kong to join him.

Ip Man struggles against the vicissitudes of life and has to cope with his gastric pain. He also insists on having a relationship with the singer Jenny after his wife's death, even though his students strongly object to it. He also gets into conflict with Ng Chung, a White Crane master, but they become friends later. When Wong Tung gets into trouble with a mob boss called Local Dragon, Ip Man and his students show up and rescue Wong. Ip Man also defeats Local Dragon in a fight, captures him, and hands him over to the police. After the fight, he briefly meets Bruce Lee and Lee's two students. The film ends with Ip Man practising Wing Chun on a wooden dummy while Ip Chun records it on a camera, followed by actual footage of the real-life Ip Man doing the same thing.

== Cast ==
- Anthony Wong as Ip Man (Ye Wen), a Wing Chun master.
  - Kevin Cheng as young Ip Man.
- Anita Yuen as Cheung Wing-sing (Zhang Yongcheng), Ip Man's wife.
- Eric Tsang as Ng Chung (Wu Zhong), a White Crane master who befriends Ip Man.
- Jordan Chan as Tang Shing (Deng Sheng), Ip Man's student and a police officer.
- Gillian Chung as Chan Sei-mui (Chen Simei), Ip Man's student. She marries Wong Tung.
- Timmy Hung as Leung Sheung (Liang Shuang), the chairman of the general association. He spars with Ip Man at the beginning of the film and becomes one of Ip's first students. He marries Lee King.
- Jiang Luxia as Lee King (Li Qiong), Ip Man's student and an outspoken factory worker. She once participated in a violent demonstration. She marries Leung Sheung.
- Zhou Dingyu as Wong Tung (Wang Dong), Ip Man's student and a prison officer. He marries Chan Sei-mui. He was almost killed by Ngai Ba-tin after being poisoned during a match.
- Zhou Chuchu as Jenny, a singer who is romantically attracted to Ip Man.
- Zhang Songwen as Ip Chun (Ye Zhun), Ip Man's son.
- Donny Wu as Ng Chan (Wu Zan), Ip Man's student and a tram driver.
- Ken Lo as Ngai Ba-tin (Wei Batian), a martial arts master who works for Local Dragon.
- Hung Yan-yan as Local Dragon, a mob boss who controls the Kowloon Walled City.
- Wong Cho-lam as Blind Chan, a blind fortune teller.
- Queenie Chu as Sophie, Jenny's colleague who dies from her addiction to opium.
- Liu Kai-chi as Lee Yiu-wah (Li Yaohua), Ip Man's friend.
- Ip Chun as the shop owner who lets Ip Man use the phone in his shop.

== Production ==
Anthony Wong said in an email interview with Singapore's The New Paper that he was drunk when director Herman Yau called him and asked him if he would like to portray Ip Man in his movie, and he replied "yes". Although he regretted his decision later, he eventually agreed after reading the script. To prepare for his role, Wong went on a diet and started practising Wing Chun on a wooden dummy given to him by producer Checkley Sin.

Ip Man's elder son, Ip Chun, who played Leung Bik in Herman Yau's previous Ip Man film, The Legend Is Born – Ip Man (2010), makes a cameo appearance in Ip Man: The Final Fight as the shop owner who lets Ip Man use the phone in his shop. Kevin Cheng, who played the titular role from the 2013 television series Ip Man, made a guest appearance as young Ip Man.

The story of Ip Man: The Final Fight was written by Checkley Sin (one of the film's producers), who is a student of Ip Chun.

Checkley Sin invested over HK$100 million for the construction of the Xiqiao DreamWorks film studio in Mount Xiqiao, Foshan, Guangdong, recreating sets that imitate colonial Hong Kong of the early 1950s. Principal photography took place in August 2012 at the studio. Anita Yuen remarked that she felt like she had travelled back in time after entering the studio.

== Release ==
Ip Man: The Final Fight was the opening film at the 37th Hong Kong International Film Festival on 17 March 2013. It was released in mainland China on 22 March 2013, and in Hong Kong theatres on 28 March. Ip Man: The Final Fight was chosen for the 2013 San Diego Asian Film Festival.

== Reception ==
The review aggregator website Rotten Tomatoes reported that 67% of critics have given the film a positive review based on 18 reviews, with an average rating of 5.64/10. At Metacritic, the film has a weighted average score of 55 out of 100 based on 10 critics, indicating "mixed or average reviews".

Deborah Young of The Hollywood Reporter wrote:

... Herman Yau's Ip Man – The Final Fight is an enjoyable if far less sophisticated tale that nostalgically taps into Hong Kong cinema of yesteryear, while still delivering considerable excitement in the fight scenes. Offshore, it may hitch a ride with dyed-in-the-wool martial arts fans on the coattails of The Grandmaster, but more likely will get lost in the shadow.

Yvonne Teh of South China Morning Post wrote:

And while veteran writer Erica Li Man's treatment of the Ip Man story can at times feel like it's been stretched too thin, her script helps to flesh out the principles of wing chun and provide an added layer to the martial art whose moves action choreographers Li Chung-chi and Checkley Sin Kwok-lam have captured to great effect in this movie.

Hong Kong film director Patrick Kong commented in Headline Daily:

The most exciting part is actually Anthony Wong's vivid performance. He brought Ip Man's emotions to life. That is not acting, it's a way of getting along swimmingly [with his character], something that cannot be described in words. Only through watching can we feel it and discover that it's breathtaking.

Hong Kong film critic Sek Kei, writing for Ming Pao, said:

One of the advantages of Ip Man: The Final Fight is that it has a good mix of culture, martial arts, nostalgia and realism. However, disappointingly, it avoids the actual political situation of that era. It does not mention the civil war nor the riots in Hong Kong during Ip Man's time, so it fails to reflect the truth in history.
