= Ip Man =

Chinese martial artist (1893–1972)

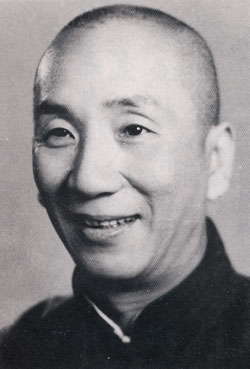
- Born: Ip Kai-man (葉繼問); 1 October 1893; Foshan, Guangdong, Qing dynasty
- Died: 2 December 1972 (aged 79); Mong Kok, Kowloon, British Hong Kong
- Native name: 葉問
- Other names: Yip Man; Yip Kai-man; Ye Wen
- Style: Wing Chun
- Teachers: Chan Wah-shun; Ng Chung-sok; Leung Bik
- Rank: Grandmaster
- Years active: 1916–1972

Other information
- Occupation: Martial artist
- Spouse: Cheung Wing-sing (m. 1916; died 1960)
- Children: Ip Chun (son); Ip Ching (son); Ip Nga-sum (daughter); Ip Nga-wun (daughter); Ip Siu-wah (son), with Shanghai Po
- Notable relatives: Ip Oi-dor (father); Ng Shui (mother)
- Notable students: Bruce Lee; Leung Sheung; Lok Yiu; Wong Shun-leung; Ip Chun; Ip Ching; Victor Kan; William Cheung; Moy Yat; Lo Man-kam; Siu Yuk-men; Chu Shong-tin; Chow Tze-chuen; Ho Kam-ming; Leung Ting
- Notable club: Ving Tsun Athletic Association

Chinese name
- Traditional Chinese: 葉問
- Simplified Chinese: 叶问
- Cantonese Yale: Yihp Mahn
Transcriptions
Standard Mandarin
- Hanyu Pinyin: Yè Wèn
- Bopomofo: ㄧㄝˋ ㄨㄣˋ
- Gwoyeu Romatzyh: Yeh Wenn
- Wade–Giles: Yeh⁴ Wên⁴
- Tongyong Pinyin: Yè Wùn
- IPA: [jê wə̂n]
Yue: Cantonese
- Yale Romanization: Yihp Mahn
- Jyutping: Jip^{6} Man^{6}
- Canton Romanization: Yip^{6} Men^{6}
- IPA: [jìːp̚ mɐ̀n]

Ip Kai-man
- Traditional Chinese: 葉繼問
- Simplified Chinese: 叶继问
- Cantonese Yale: Yihp Gai Mahn
Transcriptions
Standard Mandarin
- Hanyu Pinyin: Yè Jìwèn
- Bopomofo: ㄧㄝˋ ㄐㄧˋ ㄨㄣˋ
- Gwoyeu Romatzyh: Yeh Jih Wenn
- Wade–Giles: Yeh⁴ Chi⁴-wên⁴
- Tongyong Pinyin: Yè Jì-wùn
- IPA: [jê tɕîwə̂n]
Yue: Cantonese
- Yale Romanization: Yihp Gai Mahn
- Jyutping: Jip^{6} Gai^{3} man^{6}
- Canton Romanization: Yip^{6} Gei^{3}-men^{6}
- IPA: [jìːp̚ kɐ̄imɐ̀n]

Ip Man (Note: Chinese: 葉問; Cantonese Yale: Yihp Mahn) (born Ip Kai-man; (Note: Chinese: 葉繼問; Cantonese Yale: Yihp Gai Mahn) 1 October 1893 – 2 December 1972), also known as Yip Man, was a Chinese martial arts grandmaster. He became a teacher of the martial art of Wing Chun when he was 20. He had several students who later became martial arts masters in their own right, the most famous among them being Bruce Lee.

== Early life ==
Ip Man was born as Ip Kai-man (葉繼問) to Ip Oi-dor (葉靄多) and Ng Shui (吳瑞) as the third of his parents' four children. He grew up in a wealthy family in Foshan (Fatshan), Guangdong (Kwangtung) and received a traditional Chinese education alongside his elder brother Ip Kai-gak (葉繼格), elder sister Ip Wan-mei (葉允媚), and younger sister Ip Wan-hum (葉允堪).

Ip started learning Wing Chun from Chan Wah-shun when he was 9 or 13. Chan was 57 at the time, and Ip became Chan's 16th and last student. Due to Chan's age, he was able to train Ip for only three years before suffering a mild stroke in 1909 and retiring to his village. Ip learned most of his skills and techniques from Chan's second-most senior student, Ng Chung-sok (吳仲素).

At the age of 16, with help from his relative, Leung Fut-ting, Ip moved to Hong Kong and attended school at St. Stephen's College, by then a secondary school for wealthy families and foreigners living in Hong Kong. Six months after moving to Hong Kong, a classmate of Ip's named Lai told him that a friend of Lai's father who was an expert in Kung Fu techniques was living with them, and had offered to have a friendly sparring match with Ip.

At the time, Ip was undefeated so he eagerly accepted the challenge. He went to Lai's house on a Sunday afternoon and, after exchanging brief pleasantries, challenged the man to a duel. The man was Leung Bik and he easily overwhelmed Ip Man. Incredulous at the speed with which he had been countered, Ip requested a second duel and was beaten again, just as soundly.

Discouraged by his defeat, Ip left without a word and afterwards was so depressed that he did not dare mention that he knew Kung Fu. A week later, Lai told him that the man he had fought was asking after him. Ip replied that he was too embarrassed to return, at which point Lai told him that Leung Bik had highly praised his Kung Fu techniques and that he was the son of Leung Jan, who trained Ip's master, Chan Wah-shun. Ip proceeded to train with Leung Bik, until Leung's death in 1911.

Ip returned to Foshan in 1916 when he was 24 and became a police officer there for the Nationalist government. He taught Wing Chun to several of his subordinates, friends, and relatives, but did not officially run a martial arts school. Noted students of this time were Lok Yiu, Chow Kwong-yue (周光裕), Kwok Fu (郭富), Lun Kah (倫佳), Chan Chi-sun (陳志新), and Lui Ying (呂應). Chow Kwong-yue was regarded as the most talented of Ip's Foshan students, but he devoted himself to trade and abandoned the martial arts. Kwok Fu and Lun Kah began teaching and spreading the art of Wing Chun in the Foshan and Guangdong region. Chan Chi-sun and Lui Ying moved to Hong Kong but neither accepted students.

Ip married Cheung Wing-sing and they had several children: sons Ip Chun and Ip Ching, and daughters Ip Nga-sum (葉雅心) and Ip Nga-wun (葉雅媛).

During the Second Sino-Japanese War, Ip Man sided with Kuomintang during the conflict. What Ip Man did during the war remains unclear. It is rumoured that he had joined the Central Bureau of Investigation and Statistics in its academy in Guizhou in 1938, after which he would have returned to Foshan as an undercover intelligence officer. However, the veracity of this has been disputed. It is believed Ip went to live with Kwok Fu during the war and only returned to Foshan at the end of the war.

After the war, Ip Man served for a few years as captain of the Foshan police patrols. Ip found some time to train his second son, Ip Ching, during the year 1949. At the end of 1949, after the Chinese Communist Party won the Chinese Civil War, as Ip was a member of the Kuomintang, Ip, his wife and their elder daughter, Ip Nga-sum, left Foshan for Hong Kong.

== Life in Hong Kong ==
Ip, his wife Cheung, and their daughter arrived in Hong Kong through Macau in 1950. His wife and daughter later returned to Foshan to retrieve their identity cards. Due to the closure of borders between China and Hong Kong in 1951, Ip and Cheung were separated for good, with Cheung remaining in Foshan until her death.

After having moved to Hong Kong, the 56-year-old Ip Man struggled with unemployment. Ip's only prior experience was as a policeman in Foshan, but he was either unable or refused to join the Hong Kong Police Force. Ip's friends were able to help him get a job at a restaurant, where he would make new associates via the Hong Kong Restaurant Workers' Association. The association also had a club for martial artists, led by Leung Sheung, but Ip Man didn't want others to know that he was a martial artist.

Ip is known to have been addicted to opium and, after moving to Hong Kong, he was able to buy it on the black market. Opium was very expensive at the time, so Ip had to earn a steady income to smoke opium while supporting his family in Foshan.

Ip began teaching Wing Chun in the early 1950s, to escape poverty and to allegedly feed his opium addiction. His earliest students consisted mainly of "poor and uneducated" members of the Restaurant Workers' Association and "restless and angry young men", who were attracted to Ip Man's charismatic personality and the prospect of getting tougher in order to survive the dangerous environment of 1950s Hong Kong. Initially, Ip Man's teaching business was poor in Hong Kong because Ip's students typically stayed for only a couple of months. He moved his school twice, first, to Castle Peak Road in Sham Shui Po, and then to Lee Tat Street (利達街) in Yau Ma Tei, to where only a few of his former students followed and continued to train with him. One of the notable students was Grandmaster Chow Tze Chueng, the teacher of Sifu Donald Mak. By then, some of his students had attained proficiency in Wing Chun and were able to start their own schools. They went on and sparred with other martial artists to compare their skills, and their victories helped to increase Ip's fame.

Around 1955, he had a mistress from Shanghai, who was referred to by his students simply as Shanghai Po (上海婆). Ip and this mistress had an extramarital son named Ip Siu-wah (葉少華). In Foshan, his wife Cheung died of cancer in 1960. Ip never formally introduced his mistress to his other sons, who eventually arrived in Hong Kong to reunite with him in 1962.

By the 1960s, Ip Man was becoming more famous in the Hong Kong community. This allowed him to attract wealthier and better-educated people to become his students. In 1967, Ip and some of his students established the Ving Tsun (Wing Chun) Athletic Association (詠春體育會). The main purpose of the Ving Tsun Athletic Association was to help Ip tackle his financial difficulties in Hong Kong, which was due to his regular use of opium. One of his former students, Duncan Leung, claimed that Ip used tuition money to support his opium addiction. Ip's mistress died of cancer in 1968, and their son later became a Wing Chun practitioner, as did his half-brothers.

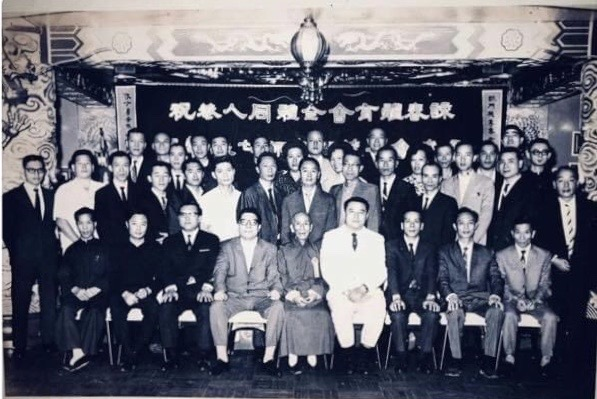
The original Ip Man Wing Chun Association in Hong Kong, around 1960

== Death and legacy ==
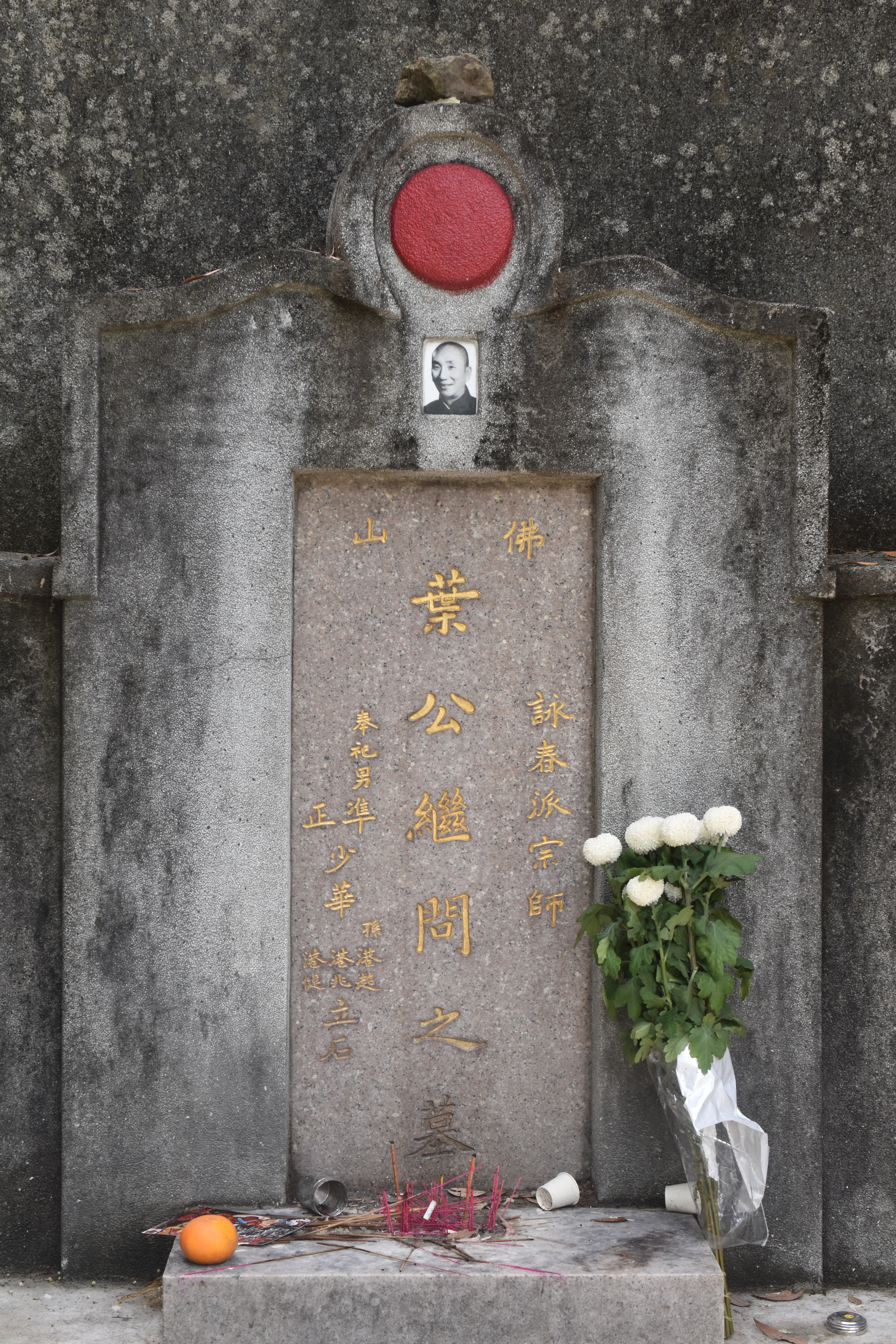
Ip Man's gravestone on Wu Tip Shan, Fanling, Hong Kong

Ip died on 2 December 1972, in his unit at 149 Tung Choi Street in Hong Kong, from throat cancer, only seven months before the death of Bruce Lee, his most famous student. He was buried at Wo Hop Shek, Hong Kong.

Ip's notable students include Bruce Lee, Leung Sherng (梁相), Moy Yat, Chu Shong-tin, Lok Yiu (駱耀), Wong Shun-leung, Jiu Wan (招允), Ho Kam-ming, Victor Kan, Lo Man-kam, William Cheung, Ip Ching, Ip Chun and Leung Ting. Ip wrote a history of Wing Chun. Many artefacts of his life are on display in the Ip Man Museum on the Foshan Ancestral Temple grounds. Ip Man is portrayed in many films based on his life.

In 2000, Ip was inducted into the Martial Arts History Museum Hall of Fame.

== Martial arts ==
The Wing Chun lineage according to Ip Man.

Ng Mui (one of the Five Elders of Shaolin Monastery)
Yim Wing-chun (taught self-defense techniques (later named after the student) by Ng Mui)
Leung Bok-chau (Yim's husband)
Leung Lan-kwai
Wong Wah-bo (was taught the pole form by Leung Yee-tai in exchange for the empty hand system)
Leung Yee-tai (added his pole form to the empty hand system he learned from Wong)
Leung Jan
Chan Wah-shun
Yip Man (also learned from Ng Chung-sok, Leung Bik)
Known students: See Branches of Wing Chun

== Media portrayals ==
In the 1976 film, Bruce Lee: The Man, The Myth, Ip Man's eldest son, Ip Chun, portrayed his father in a minor role as Bruce Lee's Wing Chun Sifu.

Ip Man was portrayed by Wang Luoyong in Dragon: The Bruce Lee Story in a 1993 American biographical drama film based on the life of Bruce Lee, who was one of Ip's students.

In the 1999 film, What You Gonna Do, Sai Fung? (a.k.a. 1959 某日某), he was portrayed by his son, Ip Chun, again as a special appearance.

Yu Chenghui portrayed Ip Man in the 2008 Chinese television series, The Legend of Bruce Lee, which was also based on the life of Bruce Lee.

Ip Man, a Hong Kong film starring Donnie Yen as the martial artist, was released in 2008. The film takes a number of liberties with Ip's life, often for dramatic effect. Ip's eldest son, Ip Chun, appears in the film and served as a consultant on the production, which focuses on Ip's life during the 1930s to the 1940s, during the Second Sino-Japanese War.

The sequel, Ip Man 2, focused on Ip's beginnings in Hong Kong and his students, including Bruce Lee. Ip Man has taught many other people. Amid a surge of Ip Man–related film projects in production, Donnie Yen told the Chinese media in March 2010 that after Ip Man 2, he would no longer play the Wing Chun master, stating, "I would never ever touch any films related to Ip Man. This will be my final film on the subject. Whenever something becomes a success, everyone would jump on the bandwagon, this is very frightening. Did you know how many Ip Man films are in production? Under such condition, we would not progress, it'd only lead to over-saturation of the subject matter."

Another Hong Kong film based on Ip Man's life, called The Legend Is Born – Ip Man, was released in June 2010. Herman Yau directed the film and it starred Dennis To as Ip Man and Wen Junhui of the South Korean band Seventeen as his younger counterpart. Ip Chun makes a special appearance in the film as Leung Bik.

In the 2010 film, Bruce Lee, My Brother, Ip Man was portrayed by Wong Chi-wai.

Wong Kar-wai's The Grandmaster stars Tony Leung as Ip Man. The film focuses more on the end of an era in Chinese martial arts history as the Second Sino-Japanese War broke out. It was created in an almost biographical style, highlighting parts of history. In contrast with other Ip Man–related projects, The Grandmaster is a more reflective film, focusing more on the musings and philosophies between martial arts and life, as well as Ip Man's journey through the early 1930s to the early 1950s.

The 2013 Chinese television series Ip Man, based on Ip Man's life, was first aired on the television network Shandong TV from late February to mid March 2013. It was directed by Fan Xiaotian and starred Kevin Cheng as the eponymous character and Zhou Jianan as the younger counterpart.

The 2013 Hong Kong film, Ip Man: The Final Fight, directed by Herman Yau and starring Anthony Wong as Ip Man, focuses on Ip's later life in Hong Kong. Kevin Cheng from the 2013 television series Ip Man made a guest appearance as young Ip Man. Ip Chun made a cameo appearance in the film. This film also focuses on the loyalty of Ip Man's students towards their master.

Despite Yen's statement in March 2010 that he no longer wanted to be involved in future films related to Ip Man, a new film to the same series, Ip Man 3, was released on 24 December 2015, with Yen once again reprising his role as Ip Man.

In the 2018 action-comedy film Kung Fu League, Dennis To returned in the role of Ip Man, with three other martial artists, Wong Fei-hung, Huo Yuanjia, and Chen Zhen, whisked through time to teach martial arts to a modern-day comic book artist caught in a love triangle. Later in the movie, he reveals he's actually an imposter, Ip Bit Man.

In the 2019 film, Ip Man and Four Kings, he was portrayed by Michael Tong. In this film, he must fight the Four Kings before he can confront a human trafficking ring and avenge the death of one of his students.

In the 2019 film, Ip Man: Kung Fu Master, Dennis To reprised the role again as Ip Man, set during his time as a police officer in Guangzhou, before the start of the Chinese Communist Revolution in 1949.

Donnie Yen reprised his role as Ip Man for the last time in Ip Man 4, which focused on Ip Man coming to San Francisco to find a school for his son as he himself struggled with cancer. The film was released on 20 December 2019.

The 2022 film, Ip Man: The Awakening, sees a young Ip Man (portrayed by Miu Tse) visiting Hong Kong and becoming involved in stopping a human trafficking ring.

In 2026 there was Ip Man: Kung Fu Legend starring Yu-Hang To and Philip Condron.

The upcoming feature-length documentary, Yip Man Legacy, recounts the life events of Grandmaster Yip Man (aka Ip Man), and his disciples Wong Shun Leung and Bruce Lee.

== Bibliography ==
- Chu, Robert; Ritchie, Rene; Wu, Y. (2015). The Definitive Guide to Wing Chun's History and Tradition. Tuttle Publishing. ISBN 978-1-4629-1753-2.
- Benjamin N. Judkins & Jon Nielson (2015). The Creation of Wing Chun: A Social History of the Southern Chinese Martial Arts. SUNY Press. ISBN 978-1438456959.
- John Little, Danny Xuan (2015). The Tao of Wing Chun: The History and Principles of China's Most Explosive Martial Art. Simon and Schuster. ISBN 9781632209955.
