= Shifu =

Title for an expert or martial arts teacher in Chinese culture

Variation 1
- Traditional Chinese: 師傅
- Simplified Chinese: 师傅
- Literal meaning: Teacher-instructor
Transcriptions
Standard Mandarin
- Hanyu Pinyin: Shīfù
Yue: Cantonese
- Jyutping: Si1 fu3-2
- Sidney Lau: Sifu

Variation 2
- Traditional Chinese: 師父
- Simplified Chinese: 师父
- Literal meaning: Teacher-father
Transcriptions
Standard Mandarin
- Hanyu Pinyin: Shīfù
Yue: Cantonese
- Jyutping: Si1 fu6-2
- Sidney Lau: Sifu

Shifu is a Chinese cultural term. Although its pronunciation always sounds the same, there are two ways of writing it using Chinese characters, and they bear two different meanings. The first variation, Shīfù 師傅 ('Expert Instructor'), is used as an honorific, which is applied to various professionals in everyday life.

The second variation, Shīfu 師父 ('Father-Teacher'), is an honorific usually reserved as a title to describe teachers of self and spiritual cultivation practices including those who might teach other encompassing Chinese traditions, such as martial arts, painting, sculpting, feng shui, singing, etc. While in China both variations are commonly used, in English-speaking countries people are mostly familiar with the second way of writing, in the context of the martial art traditions.

In the second inflection, Shifu has a deeper meaning than just a teacher, but a teacher who gives the utmost care for their pupils, as would a father or mother. The martial arts honorific is also commonly Romanized as Sifu (from Cantonese Chinese) or Saihu (from Hokkien Chinese).

== Etymology ==
"Shifu" is in fact the English spelling of two similar but distinct Chinese words (师傅; shīfù and 师父; shīfu). The only phonetic difference between the two words is the tone of the second syllable. Because English is not a tonal language, in English texts the two words are usually written the same way. Even among native speakers of Chinese, the words are pronounced so similarly and have such similar meanings, the precise difference between the two is sometimes unclear.

The first word (师傅; shīfù) is made up of syllables meaning "teacher" and "mentor", and is used by an apprentice speaking to their mentor. Shifu (师傅; shīfù) historically referred to master craftsmen. However, by the late twentieth century, artisans no longer occupied the same place of reverence they once did. Shifu is therefore less widely used in the shift towards an industrial and service economy. Alternatively, it is used as a respectful form of address for skilled tradespeople, such as pharmacists, and workers in various trades like construction, plumbing, carpentry, welding, and electrical work, as well as technicians in fields like telecommunications and mechanics. In Mainland China during the Cultural Revolution, shifu was sometimes adopted as a substitute for "comrade" (同志, tóngzhì) to refer to any stranger.

The second term (师父; shīfu) replaces the syllable meaning "mentor" with one meaning "father". It can also be used to address a teacher, but the substitution lends it a more intimate tone and indicates a heightened level of respect. It has an association with religion, because Buddhist monks, Confucian scholars and Taoist priests often establish master/apprentice-like relationships with initiates and are addressed with this term.

Although a martial arts shifu may establish a Master-Apprentice type of relationship with certain students, the Chinese characters used for the term do not imply 'Mastery'. Rather, the characters mean either 'expertise with teaching ability' (shīfù 師傅) in the case of a professional, or 'teaching as a father would' (shīfu 師父) in the case of a martial arts instructor.

== Use in martial arts ==
Traditionally in Chinese Martial Arts, and still today, shifu has been used as a familial term and sign of respect for teachers. Shifu is not a rank (like a 'black belt'), but rather, a title, similar to that of 'Sensei' in Japanese Martial Arts'.

A shifu was deemed a "father", therefore his disciples would address each other as "brothers" or "sisters", particularly "big brothers" (師兄; shīxiōng), "little brothers" (師弟; shīdì), "big sisters" (師姐; shījiě) and "little sisters" (師妹; shīmèi). More specific familial prefixes could also be used, for example as in "biggest brother" (大師兄; dàshīxiōng), "second biggest (big) sister" (二師姐; èrshījiě), "third biggest (little) sister" (三師妹; sānshīmèi). Unlike actual familial prefixes however, dà-, èr-, sān-, etc. usually depended on the order in which a disciple was officially adopted by the master (i.e. seniority), not on their age. Likewise, whether or not fellow disciples are addressed as "big" or "little" brother/sister depended on whether they were adopted by the master before or after the subject, not on whether or not they are actually older or younger in age.

Despite the "father" meaning of the word 父, the term 師父/师父 is also used to address a female teacher, while the term shīmǔ (師母/师母) or "master-mother" is used to address a male teacher's wife. A female teacher's husband is addressed as shīzhàng (師丈/师丈) or "master-husband". Additionally, there are also terms for the master's fellow disciples, such as "big uncle" (師伯) or "little uncle" (師叔), which also apply regardless of sex. Whether or not they are addressed as "big uncle" or "little uncle" also depends on when that person was adopted by the master's master, not their age.

The term takes on a less intimate context when a student becomes a formal student or disciple of the teacher. The acceptance as a student is a very formal event, usually requiring a discipleship ceremony called bai shi (拜師/拜师). After the ceremony, the relationship is defined in a more direct parent–child context and usage takes on this term rather than a generic sign of respect for skill and knowledge. The disciple may then, by their closer relationship with the shifu, gain more intimate and sometimes secretive knowledge, about the style being taught.

== See also ==
- Duan wei (ranks in Chinese martial arts)
- Fashi: Masters of Rites in Chinese ritual mastery traditions
- Master Shifu, character in Kung Fu Panda
- Burmese: Sayadaw
- Japanese: sensei
- Sanskrit: guru
- Thai: Ajahn
- Tibetan: Lama
- Academic genealogy
