= Ip Chun =

Chinese Grandmaster of Wing Chun (born 1924)

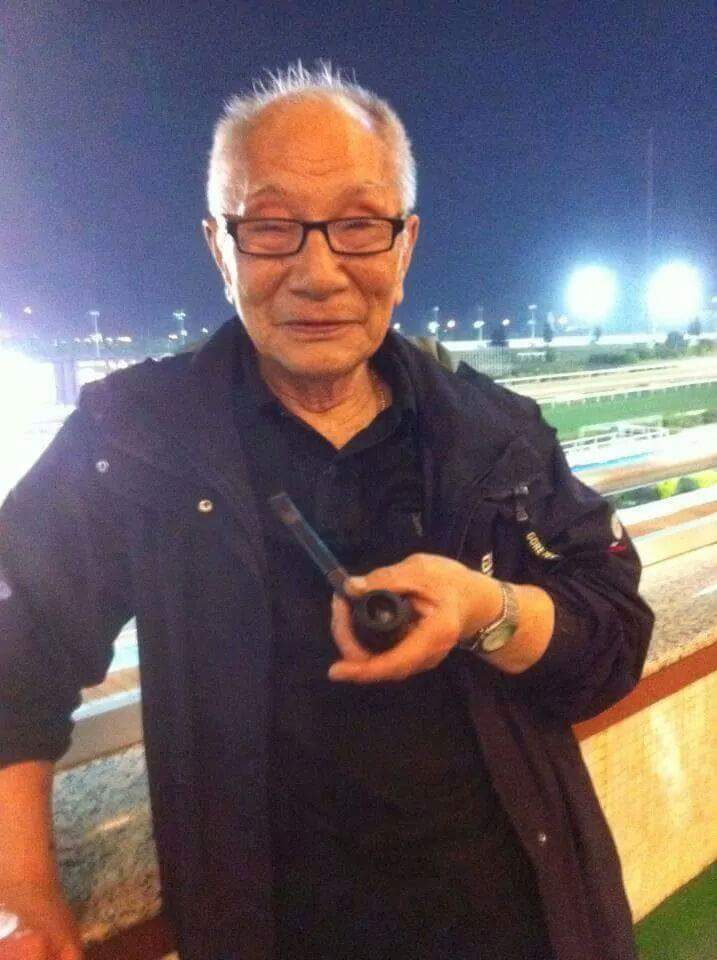
- Ip in 2018
- Born: Ip Hok-chun (葉學準); 10 July 1924 (age 102); Foshan, Kwangtung, Republic of China
- Native name: 葉準
- Other names: Yip Chun; Yip Jun
- Style: Wing Chun
- Teacher: Ip Man
- Rank: Grandmaster
- Years active: 1967–present

Other information
- Occupation: Martial arts practitioner; Actor; Teacher
- Children: Ip Kong-chiu (son); Ip Kong-kin (son)
- Notable relatives: Ip Man (father); Cheung Wing-sing (mother); Ip Ching (younger brother); Ip Nga-sum (sister); Ip Nga-wun (sister); Ip Siu-wah (half-brother)
- Notable students: Donnie Yen
- Notable club: Wing Chun Ip Chun Academy
- Website: http://www.ipchun.net

Chinese name
- Traditional Chinese: 葉準
- Simplified Chinese: 叶准
Transcriptions
Standard Mandarin
- Hanyu Pinyin: Yè Zhǔn
Yue: Cantonese
- Yale Romanization: Yihp Jéun
- Jyutping: Jip6 Zeon2

Ip Chun (Note: Chinese: 葉準) (born Ip Hok-chun; (Note: Chinese: 葉學準) 10 July 1924), also known as Yip Chun or Yip Jun, is a martial artist and actor in the style of Wing Chun. He is the elder of two sons. His father, Ip Man, was the Wing Chun teacher of Bruce Lee.

== Early life ==
Ip was born Ip Hok-chun in Foshan, Kwangtung (now Guangdong) on 10 July 1924 to police officer and martial artist Ip Man and his wife Cheung Wing-sing.

In 1949, after the Communists established the People's Republic of China in mainland China, Ip's father left for Hong Kong and Ip, then 24, remained in Foshan to continue his studies in university. However, due to the Cultural Revolution, Ip and his younger brother, Ip Ching, were forced to leave Foshan and move to Hong Kong to join their father.

== Education ==
Ip studied Chinese history, philosophy, poetry, traditional music, and Buddhism. In 1950, Ip had completed his studies and he chose teaching as a profession. In addition to teaching Chinese history, music and science, Ip also helped the Chinese Foshan Entertainment Department organise opera plays. During that time, he was awarded "The Person with the Most Potential in Chinese Art" award for his research in music.

== Professional career ==
In Hong Kong, Ip worked as an accountant and newspaper reporter in the day and practiced Wing Chun in the evening under his father's tutelage. In accordance with his father's wishes, in 1965, Ip participated in the affairs of the Ving Tsun Athletic Association and became one of its founding members when it was formally established in 1968. During the first three years in the association, Ip took on the role of treasurer and was later appointed as chairman.

== Teaching accomplishments ==
In 1967, Ip began teaching Wing Chun in Hong Kong and some of his first students, such as Leung Chung-wai and Ho Kay, chairman of Wing Chun Ip Chun Academy and a student of Ip for three decades, still train with him at present. Ip's father died in December 1972 and entrusted the film footage of his Siu Nim Tao, Chum Kiu and Muk Yan Jong forms to his sons for posterity. In 2014 Ip Chun was selected as a nominee to represent Wing Chun as the inheritor of the legacy of Wing Chun-style kung fu. Ip Chun has taught and held seminars in many cities, including countries such as Australia, England and the United States.

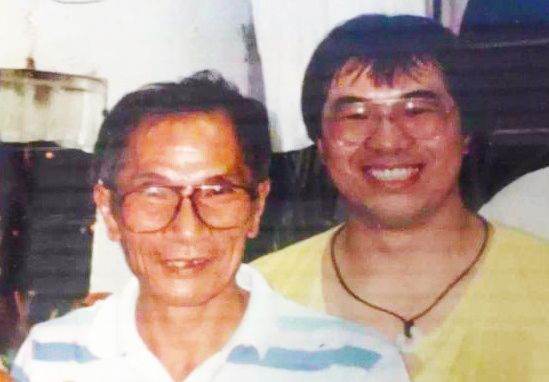
Ip Chun with a student in Australia

== In film ==
Ip Chun had a small role in the 1976 film Bruce Lee: The Man, The Myth as Bruce Lee's Wing Chun Sifu (Ip Man). Ip made a special appearance as Ip Man in the 1999 film What You Gonna Do, Sai Fung? (a.k.a. 1959 某日某). Ip served as a consultant for Ip Man, a 2008 Hong Kong film about the life of his father. He also made another special appearance as Leung Bik (son of Leung Jan) in another film, The Legend Is Born: Ip Man. In 2013, he made a cameo appearance in another Ip Man film, Ip Man: The Final Fight.

== Later life ==
He turned 100 on 10 July 2024.

== Awards and achievements ==
- Ip Chun received a Fellowship (FSMA) from the Society of Martial Arts (U.K.), the only professional and Educational Charity to introduce the first degree program in martial arts in the world, from its Founder and President Prof. Eugene de Silva PhD, FRSA in 2000.
- Received "The Person with the Most Potential in Chinese Art" award for his research in music.
- Winner of the China Movie Channel Media Awards for Best Male Supporting Role at Shanghai International Film Festival 2010.
- Nominated at the China Movie Channel Media Awards for Best New Actor at Shanghai International Film Festival 2010.

== Bibliography ==
- Ip Chun, Leung Ting, (1981) 116 Wing Tsun Dummy Techniques. Hong Kong: Leung Publications. (PDF)
