= Ip Ching =

Chinese martial artist (1936–2020)

- Born: Ip Hok-ching (葉學正); 7 July 1936; Foshan, Guangdong, Republic of China
- Died: 25 January 2020 (aged 83); Hong Kong
- Native name: 葉正
- Nationality: Chinese
- Style: Wing Chun
- Rank: Grandmaster

Other information
- Occupation: Martial arts practitioner
- Notable relatives: Ip Man (father); Cheung Wing-sing (mother); Ip Chun (big brother); Ip Nga-sum (sister); Ip Nga-wun (sister); Ip Siu-wah (half-brother)
- Notable club: Ving Tsun Athletic Association
- Website: www.ipching.org.hk

Chinese name
- Traditional Chinese: 葉學正
- Simplified Chinese: 叶学正
Transcriptions
Standard Mandarin
- Hanyu Pinyin: Yè xué zhèng
Yue: Cantonese
- Yale Romanization: Yihp Hohk Jing
- Jyutping: jip6 hok6 zing3

Ip Ching (born Ip Hok-ching; 7 July 1936 – 25 January 2020) was a Hong Kong martial artist, co-author for various short books, and a technical consultant for most movies related to him. He was one of five Grandmasters of the Ip Man (Yip Man) family of Wing Chun Kung Fu.

== Biography ==
He was born Ip Hok-ching in Foshan in 1936 as the second son of Ip Man and his wife Cheung Wing-sing. Soon after, his parents and his sister, Ip Nga-sum, left and traveled to Hong Kong in around 1950 in search of a better life for the family. Only his mother and sister returned home.

In the first years of the Cultural Revolution, Ip Ching "was sent to the countryside for an extended period of labor and reeducation with the peasantry." In 1962, Hong Kong's borders were briefly reopened, so Ip Ching and his older brother, Ip Chun, moved from Foshan to Hong Kong to join their father.

His father, Ip Man, taught from his home. In addition to learning Wing Chun at his father's home, Ip Ching had been an avid observer of his father teaching other students and gained valuable insight into his father's teaching methods. At one point, his father left home to live elsewhere due to a dispute between him and Ip Chun over his Shanghai mistress and his illegitimate son Ip Siu-wah. After that, his father rarely would interact with him or his brother outside of their training lessons.

Ip Man died in 1972, and Ip Ching left the training hall but continued to reside in his father's home. He later ran a textile manufacturing business in Lam Tei, New Territories, and continued to teach Wing Chun privately to his disciples in his home. In 1994, he retired from his business and devoted himself to teaching Wing Chun.

He served as a Wing Chun consultant alongside his brother Ip Chun on the films Ip Man 3 and Ip Man 4: The Finale, however, Ip Ching did not want to be credited nor interviewed. Jim Liu portrayed the character of Ip Ching in Ip Man 3, and Ye He portrays Ip Ching in Ip Man 4: The Finale.

Ip Ching died on 25 January 2020 due to an illness and was cremated at Cape Collinson Crematorium in Hong Kong on 8 February 2020.
