= Foshan =

Foshan 佛山市 Fut-San
- Prefecture-level city
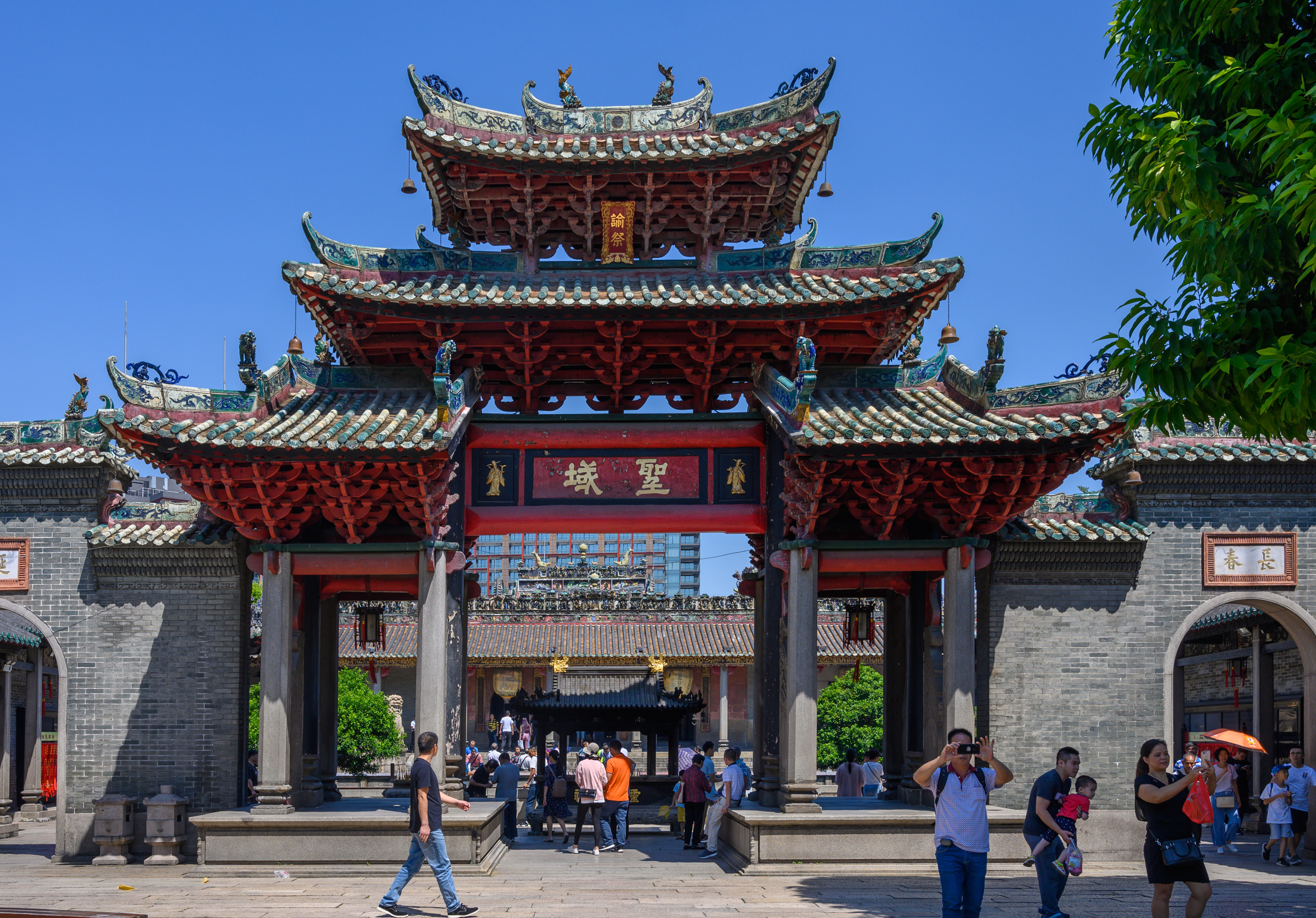
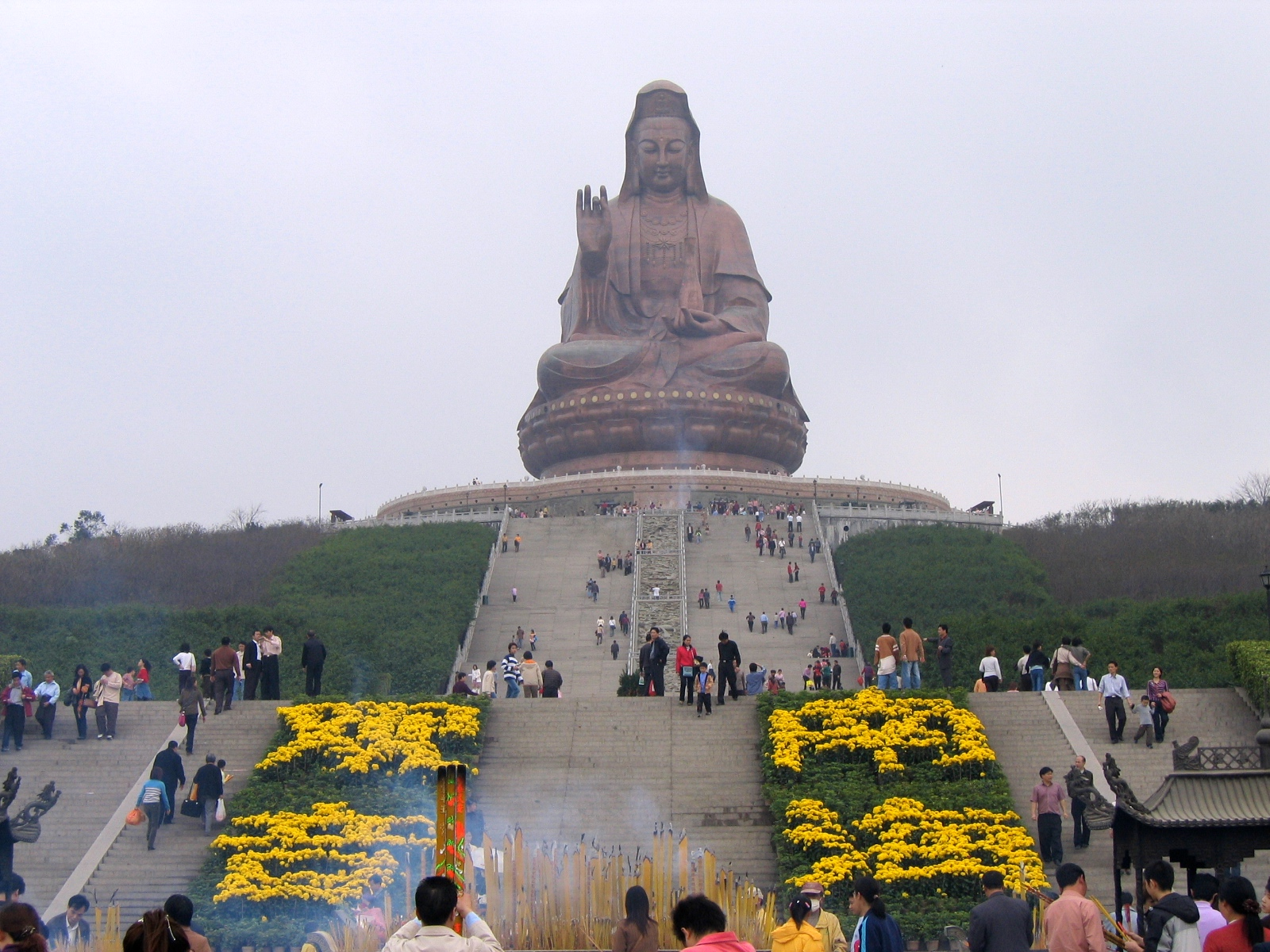
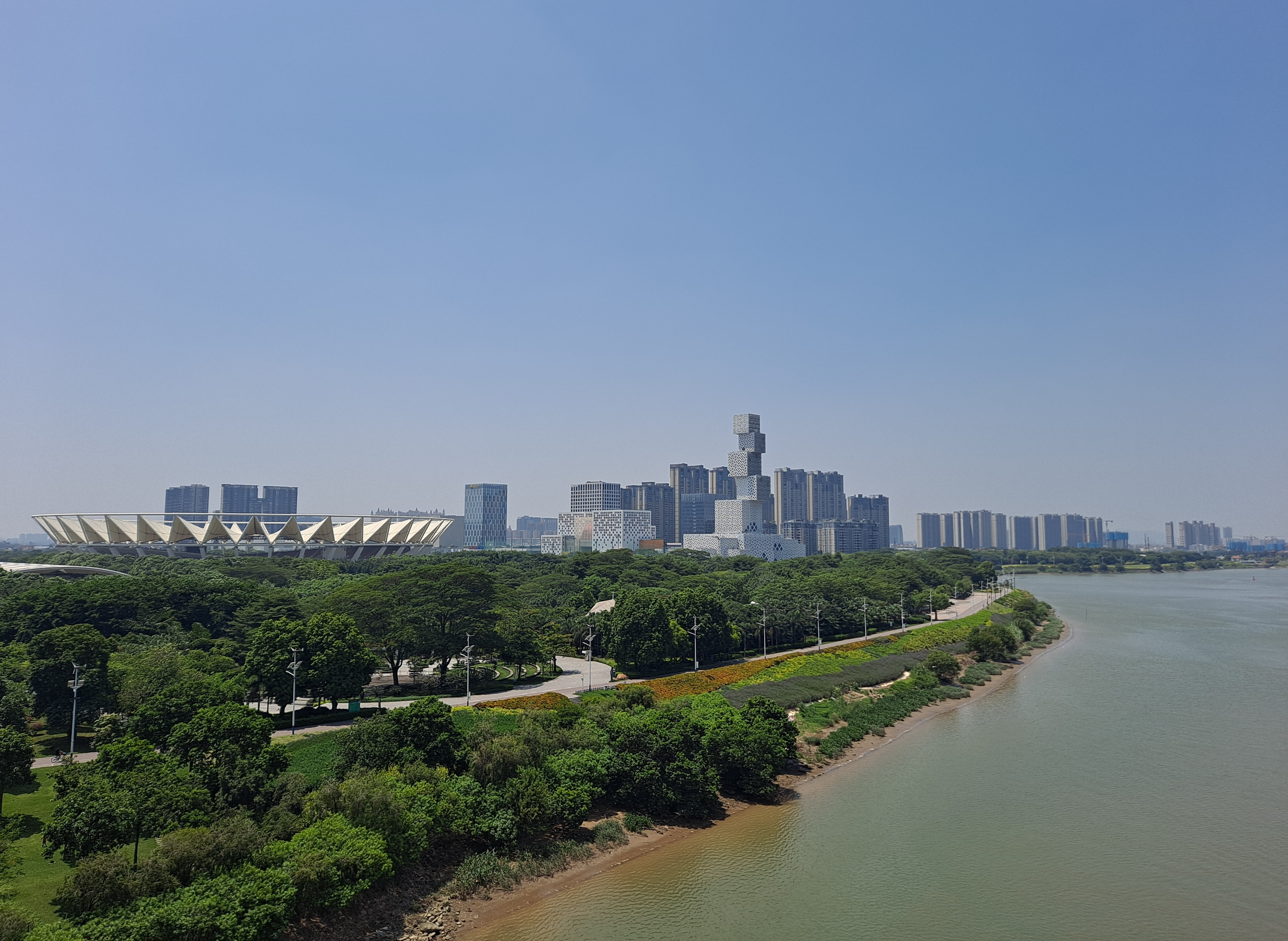
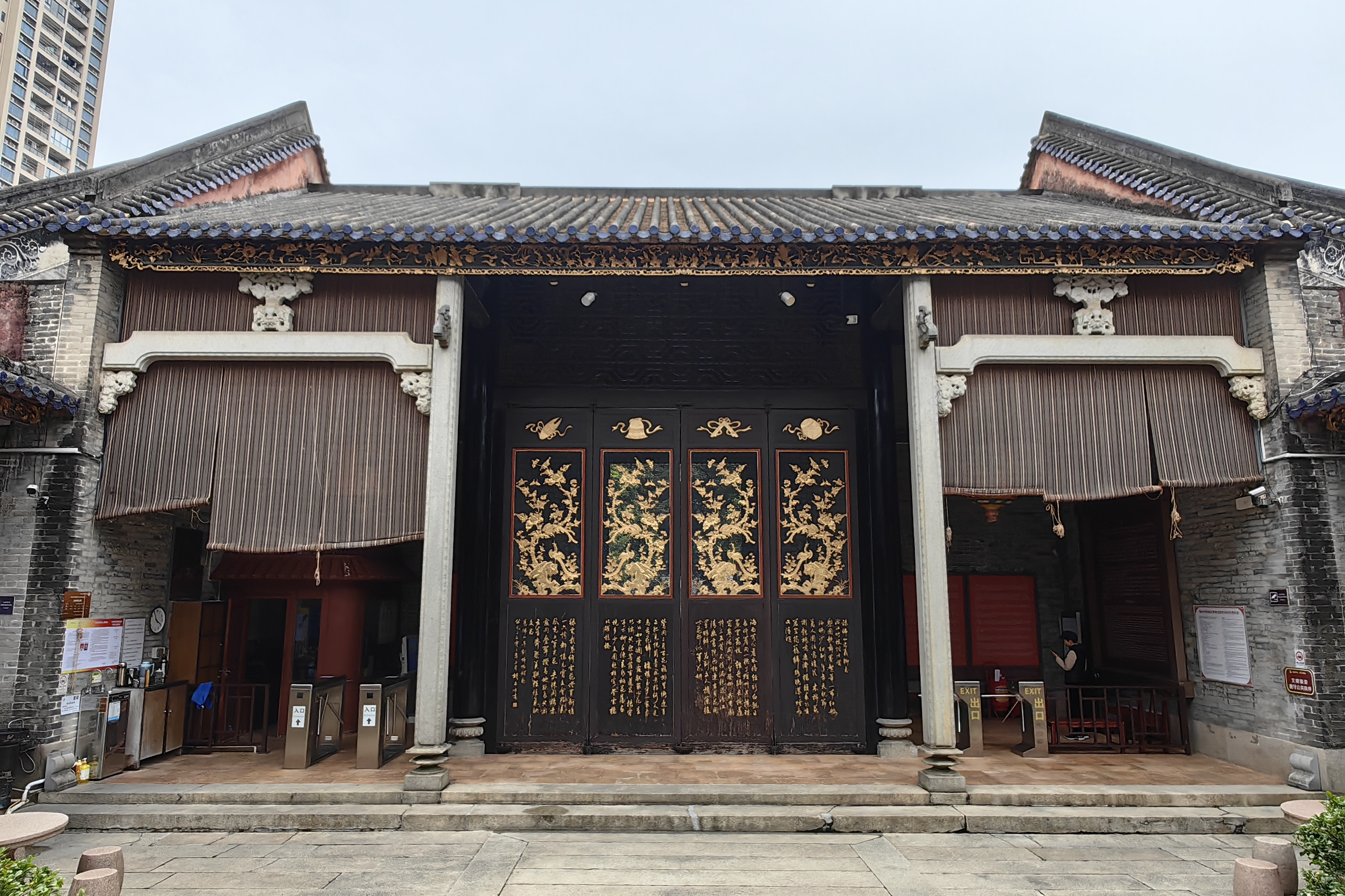
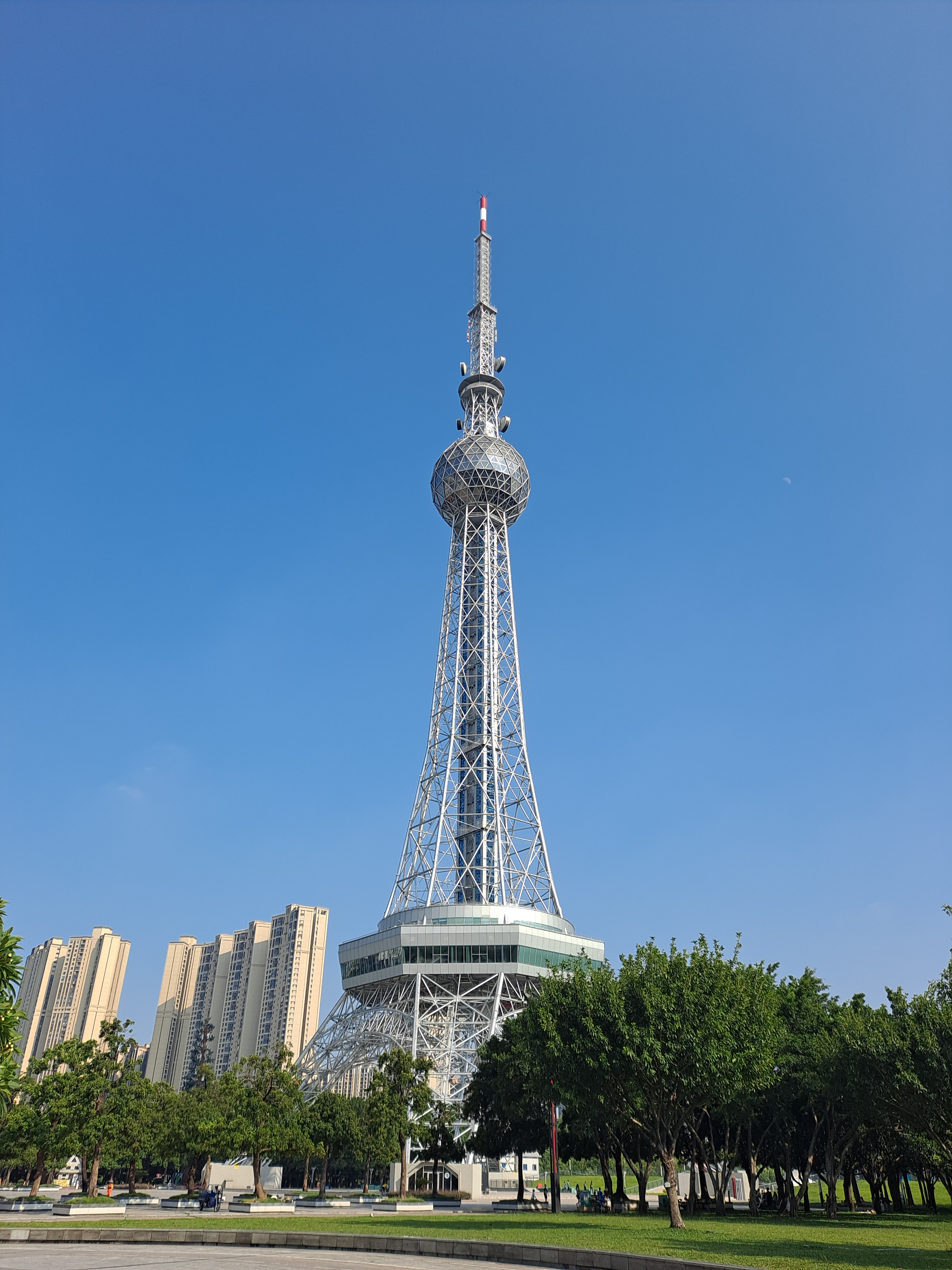
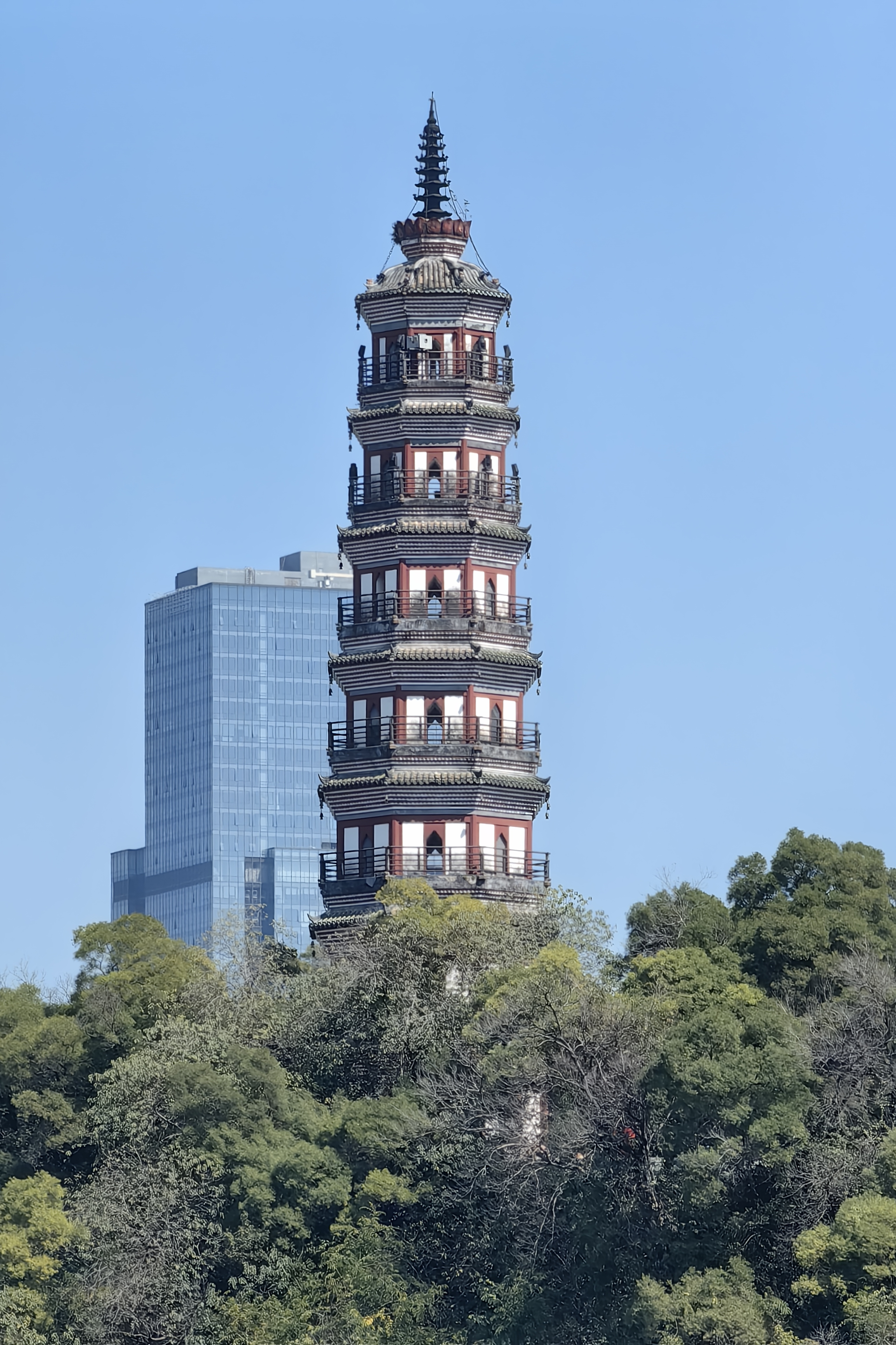
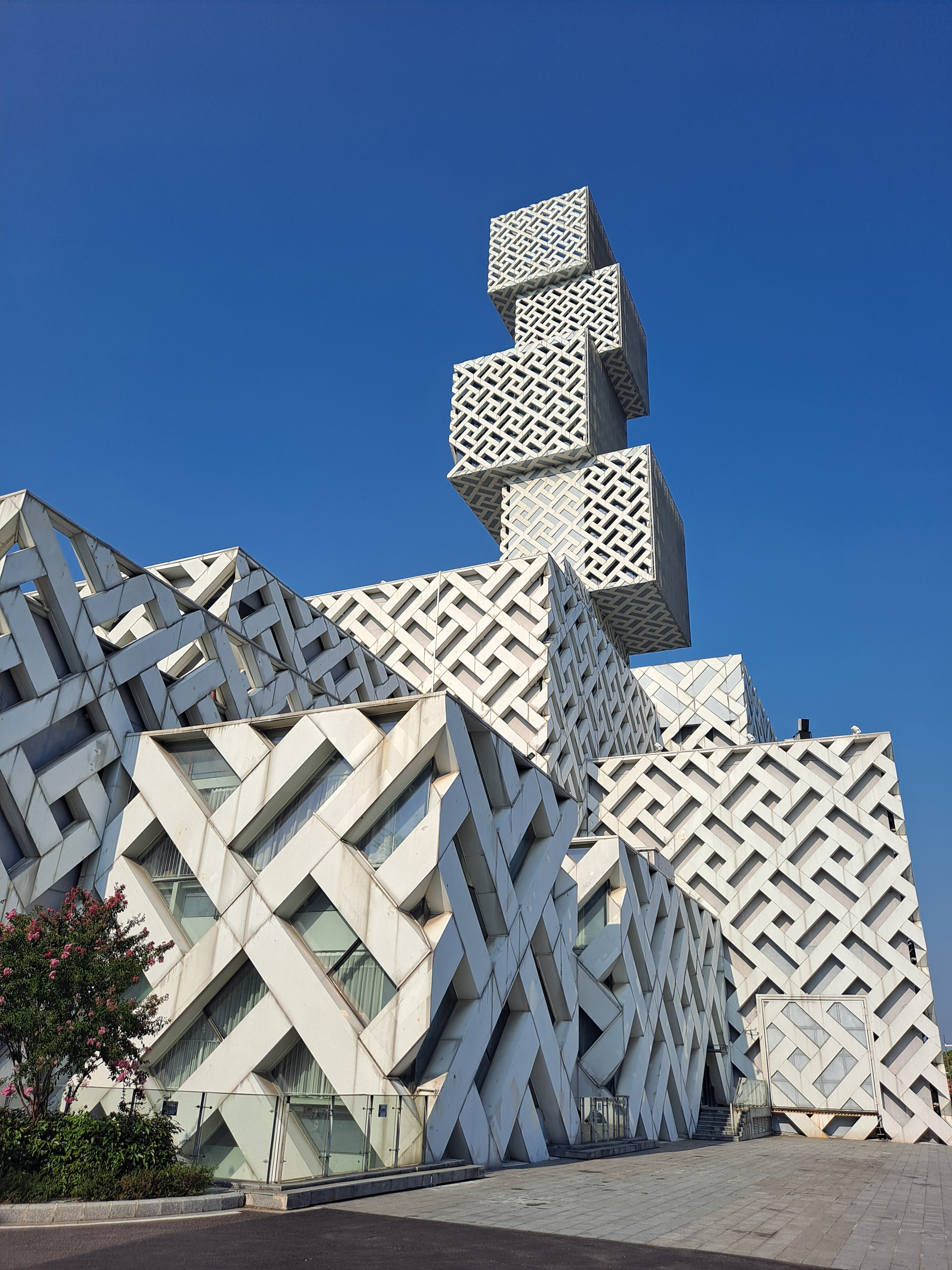
- Foshan Ancestral Temple Mount Xiqiao Century Lotus Sports Center Museum of Cantonese Opera Foshan TV Tower Qingyun Pagoda Foshan Science Center
- Nickname: 禅 (Chan)
- Location of Foshan in Guangdong
- Interactive map of Foshan
- Coordinates (Foshan municipal government): 23°01′17″N 113°07′18″E
- Country: China
- Province: Guangdong
- Municipal seat: Chancheng District

Government
  - CPC Committee Secretary: Zheng Ke (郑轲)
  - Mayor: Bai Tao (白涛)

Area
  - Prefecture-level city: 3,848 km^{2} (1,486 sq mi)
  - Water: 690 km^{2} (270 sq mi)
  - Urban: 3,848 km^{2} (1,486 sq mi)
  - Metro: 19,870.4 km^{2} (7,672.0 sq mi)
- Elevation: 16 m (52 ft)

Population (2020 census)
  - Prefecture-level city: 9,498,863
  - Density: 2,469/km^{2} (6,393/sq mi)
  - Urban: 9,042,500
  - Urban density: 2,350/km^{2} (6,086/sq mi)
  - Metro: 65,594,622
  - Metro density: 3,301.12/km^{2} (8,549.87/sq mi)

GDP
  - Prefecture-level city: CN¥ 1.759 trillion US$ 166.8 billion
  - Per capita: CN¥ 127,085; US$ 19,699
- Time zone: UTC+8 (China Standard Time)
- Postal code: 528000
- Area code: (0)757
- ISO 3166 code: CN-GD-06
- Licence plate prefixes: 粤E; 粤Y (for motor vehicles registered in Nanhai before February 2018); 粤X (for motor vehicles registered in Shunde before February 2018)
- Website: foshan.gov.cn

Foshan
- "Foshan" in Chinese characters
- Chinese: 佛山
- Hanyu Pinyin: Fóshān
- Cantonese Yale: Fahtsàan or Fahtsāan
- Postal: Fatshan
- Literal meaning: "Buddha Mountain"
Transcriptions
Standard Mandarin
- Hanyu Pinyin: Fóshān
- Bopomofo: ㄈㄛˊ ㄕㄢ
- Gwoyeu Romatzyh: Forshan
- Wade–Giles: Fo^{2}-shan^{1}
- Yale Romanization: Fwóshān
- IPA: [fwǒ.ʂán]
Yue: Cantonese
- Yale Romanization: Fahtsàan or Fahtsāan
- Jyutping: Fat6saan1
- IPA: [fɐ̀t̚.sâːn] or [fɐ̀t̚.sáːn]
Southern Min
- Tâi-lô: Pu̍t-suann

Foshan (UK: /foʊˈʃæn/, US also /-ˈʃɑːn/; Chinese: 佛山) is a prefecture-level city in central Guangdong Province, China. The entire prefecture covers 3,848 km^{2} (1,486 sq mi) and had a population of 9,498,863 as of the 2020 census. The city is part of the western side of the Pearl River Delta megalopolis, a conurbation housing 86,100,000 inhabitants, making it the biggest urban area of the world.

Foshan is regarded as the home of Cantonese opera, a genre of Chinese opera; Nanquan, a martial art; and lion dancing.

== Name ==
Fóshān is the pinyin romanization of the city's Chinese name 佛山, based on its Mandarin pronunciation. The Postal Map spelling "Fatshan" derives from the same name's local Cantonese pronunciation. Other romanizations include Fat-shan and Fat-shun. Foshan means "Buddha Mountain" and, despite the more famous present-day statue of Guanyin (or Kwanyin) on Mount Xiqiao, who isn't a Buddha, it refers to a smaller hill near the centre of town where three bronze sculptures of Buddha were discovered in AD 628. The town grew up around a monastery founded nearby that was destroyed in 1391.

== History ==
=== Pre-20th century ===
Foshan remained a minor settlement on the Fen River for most of China's history. It developed around a Tang-era Buddhist monastery that was destroyed in 1391. The Foshan Ancestral Temple, a Taoist temple to the Northern God (Beidi) that was rebuilt in 1372, became the new focus of the community by the 15th century. Foshan had grown into one of the four great markets in China, primarily on the strength of its local ceramics but also on account of its metalwork. Soon its harbor on the Fen River was limited to ships of a thousand tons' burden but it remained well connected with Guangdong's other ports. By the 19th century, Foshan was considered by the English as the "Birmingham of China", with its steel industry responsible for the consumption of the majority of the province's iron production.

=== 20th century and onwards ===
Foshan was connected to Guangzhou and Sanshui by rail in the early 20th century. The Ancestral Temple was converted into the Foshan Municipal Museum upon the victory of the Communists in the Chinese Civil War in 1949.

Foshan remained primarily focused on ceramic and steel production until the 1950s, when it became an urbanizing political center. On 26 June 1951, it left Nanhai County to become a separate county-level city and, in 1954, it was made the seat of the prefectural government. Its economy stagnated as a result of the Cultural Revolution—traditional ceramic ware was forbidden and its workshops were turned to producing Maoist and Revolutionary folderol—but it continued to grow, reaching 300,000 people by the 1970s, making it the province's second city after Guangzhou.

As early as 1973, however, its agriculture and consumer industries were permitted to become an export production base and a modern highway linked it to Guangzhou soon after. This permitted its party secretary Tong Mengqing and mayor Yu Fei to take full advantage when Deng Xiaoping introduced the reform and opening up after the fall of the Gang of Four.

In 1983, Foshan was promoted to a prefecture-level city with its former core becoming the new Chancheng District but lost the southwestern half of its former territory to Jiangmen. On 8 December 2002, Shunde and Nanhai joined its urban core as a full district.

Since 2020, a Japanese-themed street in Foshan has become a hit with young people unable to travel abroad due to the coronavirus pandemic. The 100m-long road called Ichiban Street has been outfitted by a local property developer to resemble famous commercial streets in Japan, complete with a sakura tree, an icon of Japan. The "exotic" street is attracting young people from nearby cities like Guangzhou, Zhongshan and Zhuhai as the younger Chinese generation likes many things about Japanese culture and design. In late 2020, the street was temporarily closed, renamed, and some of its signs were adjusted.

== Geography ==
Foshan (Guangdong)

Foshan lies on the Fen River in the estuaries making up the west side of the Pearl River Delta. Guangzhou lies 25 kilometers (16 mi) to the northeast, Zhongshan to the southeast, Jiangmen to the south, Qingyuan to the north, and Zhaoqing to the west.

=== Climate ===
Foshan experiences a humid subtropical climate (Köppen climate classification Cfa).

Climate data for Foshan (Nanhai District), elevation 30 m (98 ft), (1991–2020 normals, extremes 1951–present)
Month	Jan	Feb	Mar	Apr	May	Jun	Jul	Aug	Sep	Oct	Nov	Dec	Year
Record high °C (°F)	26.7 (80.1)	27.1 (80.8)	30.7 (87.3)	34.5 (94.1)	38.8 (101.8)	37.1 (98.8)	39.2 (102.6)	38.5 (101.3)	37.8 (100.0)	36.8 (98.2)	30.6 (87.1)	28.8 (83.8)	39.2 (102.6)
Mean daily maximum °C (°F)	18.3 (64.9)	19.7 (67.5)	22.3 (72.1)	26.7 (80.1)	30.5 (86.9)	32.4 (90.3)	33.7 (92.7)	33.6 (92.5)	32.2 (90.0)	29.4 (84.9)	25.2 (77.4)	20.4 (68.7)	27.0 (80.7)
Daily mean °C (°F)	14.0 (57.2)	15.7 (60.3)	18.6 (65.5)	23.0 (73.4)	26.6 (79.9)	28.6 (83.5)	29.5 (85.1)	29.4 (84.9)	28.1 (82.6)	25.1 (77.2)	20.7 (69.3)	15.8 (60.4)	22.9 (73.3)
Mean daily minimum °C (°F)	11.1 (52.0)	12.9 (55.2)	15.9 (60.6)	20.3 (68.5)	23.7 (74.7)	25.8 (78.4)	26.5 (79.7)	26.3 (79.3)	25.0 (77.0)	21.9 (71.4)	17.4 (63.3)	12.6 (54.7)	20.0 (67.9)
Record low °C (°F)	−1.9 (28.6)	2.3 (36.1)	3.4 (38.1)	10.5 (50.9)	14.9 (58.8)	18.7 (65.7)	22.8 (73.0)	23.3 (73.9)	19.6 (67.3)	10.7 (51.3)	4.4 (39.9)	3.1 (37.6)	−1.9 (28.6)
Average precipitation mm (inches)	53.1 (2.09)	54.4 (2.14)	95.8 (3.77)	161.5 (6.36)	260.9 (10.27)	308.1 (12.13)	226.6 (8.92)	266.3 (10.48)	211.1 (8.31)	78.7 (3.10)	42.2 (1.66)	35.2 (1.39)	1,793.9 (70.62)
Average precipitation days (≥ 0.1 mm)	7.2	9.3	13.8	14.6	17.2	18.5	16.5	15.8	12.3	5.3	5.7	5.7	141.9
Average relative humidity (%)	71	76	79	80	79	80	77	77	74	67	67	65	74
Mean monthly sunshine hours	104.3	75.1	61.8	73.2	112.5	132.6	178.8	167.5	157.0	170.5	150.8	140.4	1,524.5
Percentage possible sunshine	31	23	17	19	27	33	43	42	43	48	46	42	35
Source: China Meteorological Administration all-time extreme temperatureAll-time May recordall-time October record

== Economy ==
Foshan has been well known for its ceramics since the Ming dynasty, although it was forced to cease production during the Cultural Revolution.

Foshan had a ¥0.8 trillion gross domestic product in 2015, raising its per capita GDP past $10,000. Shunde District in particular has a high manufacturing output, with its 3,000+ electronical appliance factories responsible for more than half of the world's air conditioners and refrigerators. Foshan now has more than 30 towns specialized in particular industries, including furniture, machinery, and beverages.

The Foshan Hi-Tech Development Zone was founded in 1992. Its total planned area is 7.55 km^{2} (2.92 sq mi). The zone is very close to the national highway G325, as well as Guangzhou Baiyun International Airport. The major industries in the zone include automobile assembly, biotechnology, and chemicals processing.

== Administration ==
Foshan administers five county-level divisions, all of which are districts, including Chancheng, Nanhai, Sanshui, Gaoming and Shunde.

These are further divided into 32 township-level divisions, including 11 subdistricts and 21 towns.

Foshan is close to Guangzhou and considers its link with Guangzhou to be very important. As such, it is part of the Pearl River Delta and Guangdong-Hong Kong-Macau Greater Bay Area metropolis, centered on Guangzhou.

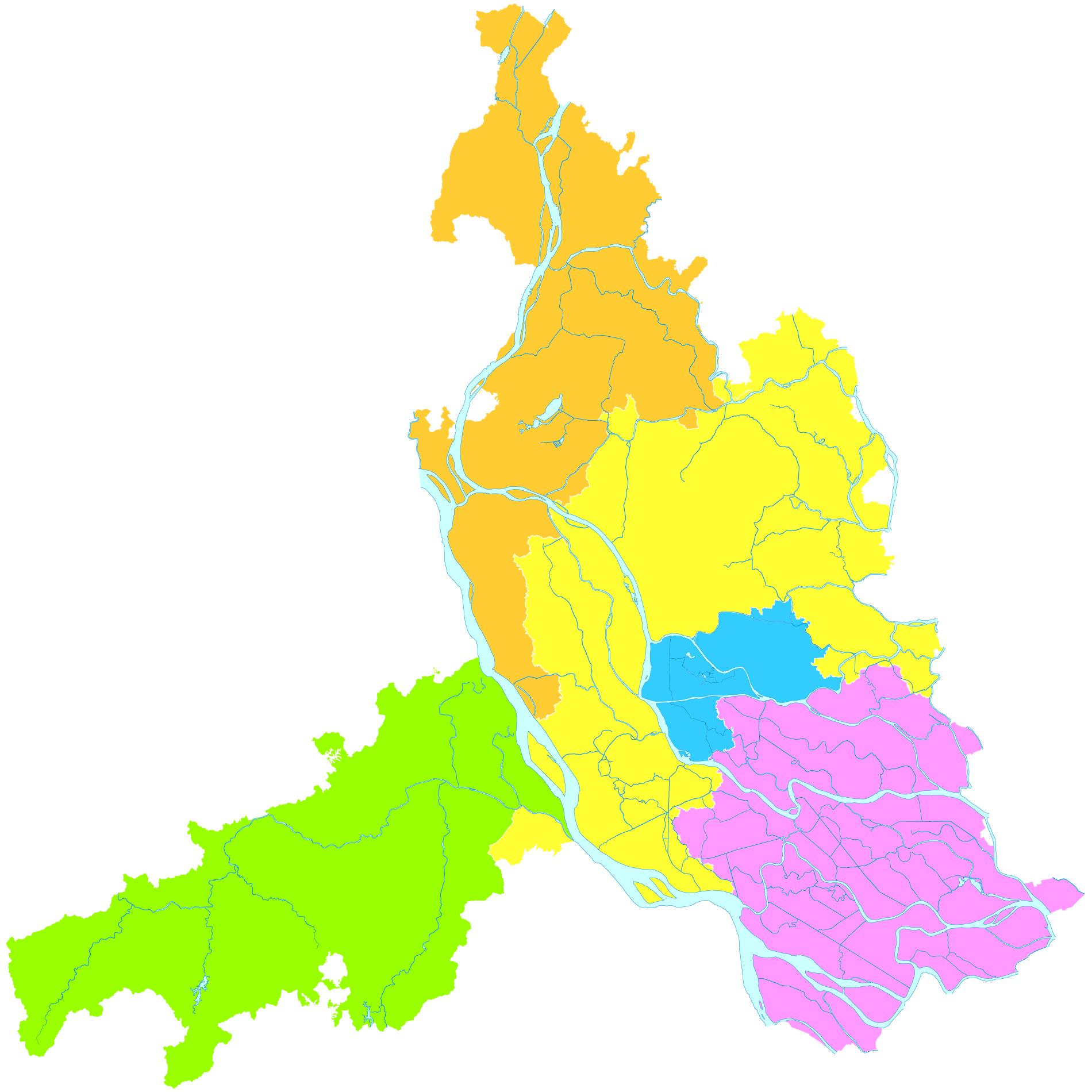

Administrative divisions of Foshan
Division code	Division	Area (km^{2})	Population (2020)	Seat	Postal code	Subdivisions			
Division code	Division	Area (km^{2})	Population (2020)	Seat	Postal code	Subdistricts	Towns	Residential communities	Administrative villages
440600	Foshan	3848.49	9,498,863	Chancheng	528000	11	21	408	328
440604	Chancheng	154.15	1,330,262	Zumiao Subdistrict	528000	3	1	89	54
440605	Nanhai	1073.94	3,667,247	Guicheng Subdistrict	528200	1	6	183	67
440606	Shunde	806.55	3,229,090	Daliang Subdistrict	528300	4	6	93	108
440607	Sanshui	874.22	803,226	Xinan Subdistrict	528100	2	5	22	48
440608	Gaoming	939.64	469,038	Hecheng Subdistrict	528500	1	3	21	51

Administrative divisions in Chinese and varieties of romanizations
English	Chinese	Pinyin	Guangdong Romanization
Chancheng District	禅城区	Chánchéng Qū	xim4 xing4 kêu1
Nanhai District	南海区	Nánhǎi Qū	nam4 hoi2 kêu1
Shunde District	顺德区	Shùndé Qū	sên6 deg1 kêu1
Sanshui District	三水区	Sānshuǐ Qū	sam1 sêu1 kêu1
Gaoming District	高明区	Gāomíng Qū	gou1 ming4 kêu1
Foshan city	佛山市	Fóshān Shì	fed6 san1 xi5

== Language ==
Located in the Sanyi region, the local dialects are based on Cantonese and often used by the city natives, particularly among older generations. As the current national language, Mandarin is the lingua franca of government, business, and education—whereas the local dialects are used on informal occasions.

== Transportation ==
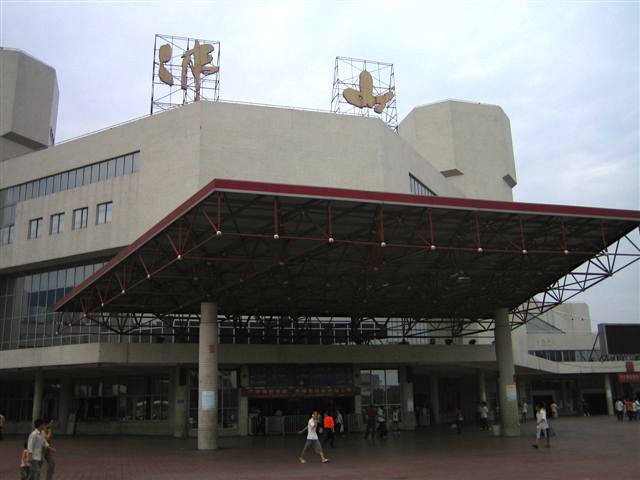
Foshan railway station

In 2013 and 2014, Foshan planned to improve public transportation by putting forward six measures:

=== FMetro ===
The first line of FMetro opened in 2010, and another two lines are completed in 2021 and 2022.

The existing line of FMetro network:

- Line 1 (Guangfo Line): From Xincheng Dong Station to Lijiao Station
- Line 2: From Nanzhuang Station to Guangzhou South Railway Station
- Line 3: From Shunde College Railway Station to Zhongshan Park Station & Lianhe Station to Foshan University Station

=== Rail ===
Foshan is a main interchange for railway routes linking Guangzhou (Guangzhou Railway Station, Guangzhoudong Railway Station and Guangzhounan Railway Station), Hong Kong and western Guangdong Province towards Guangxi.

=== Aviation ===
The city is served by Foshan Shadi Airport, and later the Pearl River Delta International Airport. It is also served by Guangzhou Baiyun International Airport.

== Education ==
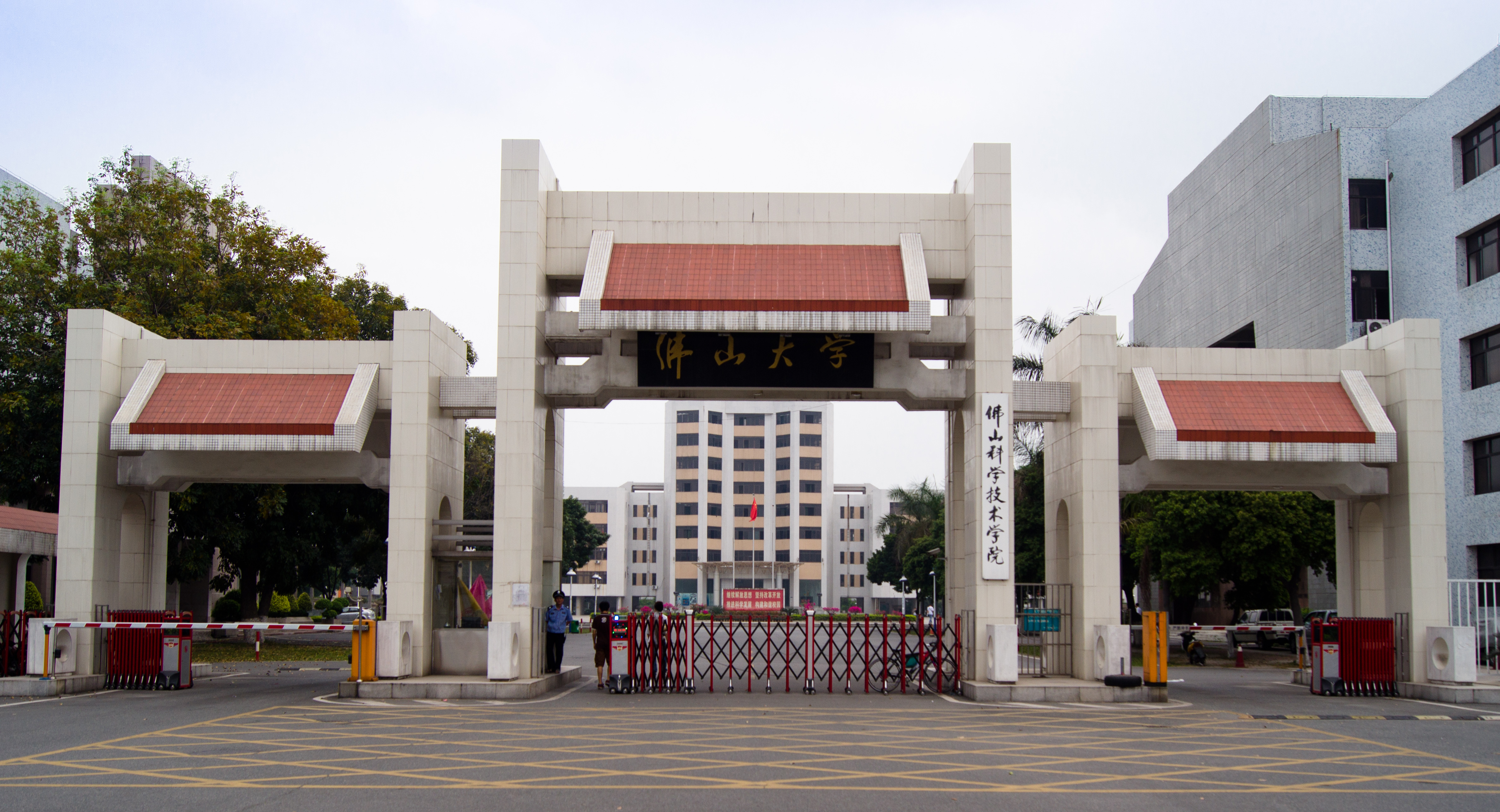
Foshan University's front gate

Like other government schools in mainland China, Mandarin is the primary language of instruction in Foshan's government schools.

=== Universities ===
- Foshan University
- South China Normal University (Foshan campus)
- Southern Medical University (Shunde campus)
- Guangdong University of Finance & Economics (Sanshui campus)

=== Schools ===
- Nanhai Senior High School

== Sports ==
Foshan was one of the host cities for the 2019 FIBA Basketball World Cup.

The city hosted events during the 2010 Asian Games. Synchronized swimming at the Foshan Aquatics Center and boxing at the Foshan Gymnasium.

In October 2014, the city hosted The Foshan Open golf event on the European Challenge Tour.

Two professional football teams have played in Foshan. From 1989 to 1997, Foshan Fosti (now disbanded) played at the New Plaza Stadium in Chancheng (now demolished). Foshan Fosti mainly played in the second tier, but did play in the eight team top tier in 1993. In 2007, newly created Guangdong Sunray Cave played at Nanhai District Stadium (now demolished), before moving to the Century Lotus Stadium in 2008. Sunray Cave then moved to Guangzhou, although did play the final games of the 2013 China League One back at Century Lotus Stadium. They returned to Guangzhou in 2014 and then disbanded.

== Destinations ==
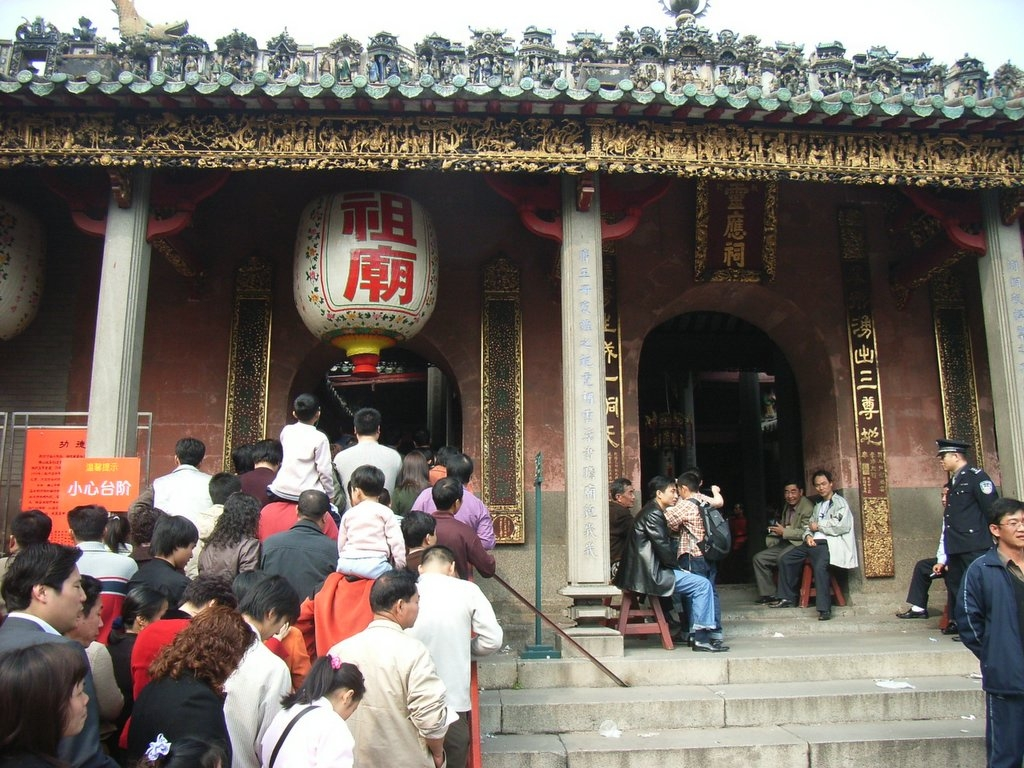
Foshan Ancestral Temple

- Crowne Plaza Foshan Hotel
- Foshan Ancestral Temple (Zumiao)
- Nanfeng Kiln
- Liang's Garden
- Wong Fei-hung Memorial Hall

== Sister cities ==
- Itami, Hyōgo Japan
- La Possession, Réunion, France (since 1989)
- Port Louis, Mauritius
- Oakland, California, United States
- Stockton, California, United States
- Markham, Ontario, Canada (Friendly co-operative)
- Townsville, Queensland, Australia
- Medway, United Kingdom
- Starogard Gdański, Poland
- St. George's, Grenada
- Ingolstadt, Bavaria, Germany (since 2013)

== Notable people ==
- Au Tak (1840–1920), Hong Kong entrepreneur
- Jeremy Bray (1930–2002), British politician
- Cai Feihu (born 1964), professor, engineer and businessman
- Cao Yuanhang (born 1991), Paralympian
- Sun Chan (born 1932), Peruvian-Chinese artist
- Chan Wah-shun (c.1836–1906), martial arts teacher of Ip Man
- Chen Jintao (1870–1939), technocrat who founded the Bank of China
- Cheok Hong Cheong (1851–1928), Australian missionary, political activist, writer, and businessman
- Cheng Yu-tung (1925–2016), Hong Kong billionaire
- Cheung Wing-sing (1897–1960), wife of Wing Chun master Ip Man
- Chin Siu-ho (born 1963), Hong Kong actor and martial artist
- Chow Chi-yuen (1900–1971), Hong Kong entrepreneur and the founder of Chow Tai Fook
- Chow Kwen Lim (1928–2016), founder and the chairman of Chow Sang Sang Jewellery Company
- Dang Fong (1877 or 1879–1955), disciple of the Chinese Kung Fu folk hero Wong Fei Hung
- Eu Tong Sen (1877 -1941), businessman in Malaya, Singapore and Hong Kong
- Feng Feng (born 1968), footballer
- Foo Ping-sheung (1895–1965), diplomat and politician in the early Republic of China and later in Taiwan
- Fung Jing Toy (c.1864–1897), American gangster
- Stanley Fung (born 1945), Hong Kong actor and film director
- Merdan Ghappar, model and prisoner
- He Xiangjian (born 1942), co-founder of Midea Group
- Hu Zaobin (1897–1942), painter
- Huang Mingda, diplomat
- Huang Shaoqiang, (1901–1942), artist
- Ip Ching (1936–2020), Hong Kong martial artist
- Ip Chun (born 1924), martial artist and actor in the style of Wing Chun
- Ip Man (1893–1972), Wing Chun grandmaster and instructor of Bruce Lee
- Kang Youwei (1858–1927), political thinker and reformer in China of the late Qing dynasty
- Ko Lai Chak (born 1976), Hong Kong table tennis player
- Kwong Wui Chun (c.1955), Hong Kong businessman
- Lai Shanzhang (born 1992), Paralympic cyclist
- Lam Cho (1910–2012), Hung Ga Grandmaster
- Lam Sai-wing (1861–1943), Hung Gar martial artist
- Law Kar-ying (born 1946), Hong Kong Cantonese opera singer and actor
- Lee Heung-kam (1932–2021), Hong Kong Cantonese opera singer and actress
- Lee Hoi-chuen (1901–1965), opera singer and actor
- Lee Shau-kee (born 1928), Hong Kong business magnate, investor, and philanthropist
- Leung Bik (1843–1911), Wing Chun martial artist
- Leung Chu Yan (born 1979), Hong Kong table tennis player
- Leung Jan (1826–1901), Wing Chun master, doctor and instructor of Ip Man
- Li Jian (born 1989), footballer
- Li Wenfan (1884–1953), revolutionary and politician
- Li Yingjian (born 1991), footballer
- Li Zhaohuan (1898–1969), educator, politician and banker
- Li Ziliu (1932–2022), politician
- Liang Dunyan (1857–1924), Qing dynasty diplomat and politician
- Liang Jiahong (born 1988), sprinter
- Liang Shiyi (1869–1933), minister who served as premier of China
- Liang Yanfen (born 2000), Paralympic athlete
- Liang Youyu (1521–1556), Ming dynasty scholar
- Lin Liang (c.1424－1500), imperial painter
- Lu Haodong (1868–1895), revolutionary activist
- Anqi Luo (born 1996), Canadian table tennis player
- Luo Zhi (1915–1949), revolutionary activist and leader in Xinjiang
- Ma Man-kei (1919–2014), Chinese-Macanese businessman, tycoon, entrepreneur and politician
- Ma Yexin (born 1999), tennis player
- Mai Shaoyan (born 1979), field hockey player
- Evergreen Mak Cheung-ching (born 1968), Hong Kong actor
- Mok Kwai-lan (1892–1982), fourth spouse of Lingnan martial arts grandmaster Wong Fei-hung
- Antonio Ng (born 1957), Macanese politician
- Ou Daren (1516–1596) Ming dynasty scholar
- Ou Mengjue (1906–1992), politician
- Ou Shizi (1234–1324), Song dynasty scholar
- Pan Kou-ang (born 1939), Taiwanese former sports shooter
- Pan Nam (1911–1995), martial artist and Grandmaster of the Wing Chun style
- Pu Jun Jin (born 1984), racing driver
- Quan Hansheng (1912–2001), economic historian
- Philip Rees (1877–1912), English medical missionary
- So Chan, martial artist and folk hero who lived during the late Qing dynasty
- So Cheung-wing (born 1960), Hong Kong businessman and politician
- Su Changlan (born c.1971), civil rights activist
- Su Xiongfeng (born 1987), long jumper
- Tan Pingshan (1886–1956), revolutionary socialist
- Sun Ma Sze Tsang (1916–1997), Cantonese opera singer and actor in Hong Kong
- Wang Yue, (2009–2011), toddler whose death was attributed to the bystander effect.
- Wang Jingwei (1883–1944), politician
- Wong Fei Hung (1847–1925), Hung Ga master and doctor, honored at a memorial hall in Chancheng
- Wong Kei-ying (c.1815–1886), Hung Ga master, doctor, father of Wong Fei Hung and one of the members of the Ten Tigers of Canton
- Wong Wah-bo, martial artist and opera singer of the late Qing dynasty
- Wu Dixi (born 1962), badminton player
- Wu Jianren (1866–1910), writer of the late Qing period
- Wu Yee-sun (1900–2005), Hong Kong entrepreneur and billionaire
- Xu Liang (1893–1951), diplomat and politician in the Republic of China
- Yam Kim-fai (1912–1989), Cantonese opera actress
- Yang Guoqiang (born 1954), entrepreneur
- Yang Huiyan (born 1981), businesswoman billionaire
- Yang Jiechang (born 1956), contemporary artist
- Yau Lit (1864–1936), revolutionary
- Yuen Kay-shan (1889–1956), Grandmaster of Wing Chun
- Zhou Wanfeng (born 1979), field hockey player
- Zhang Yinhuan (1837–1900), ambassador
- Zheng Yanfen (1902–1990), politician affiliated with the Kuomintang

== See also ==
- New first-tier city
