= Foshan Wong Fei-hung Memorial Hall =

Museum in Foshan, China

- 佛山黃飛鴻紀念館
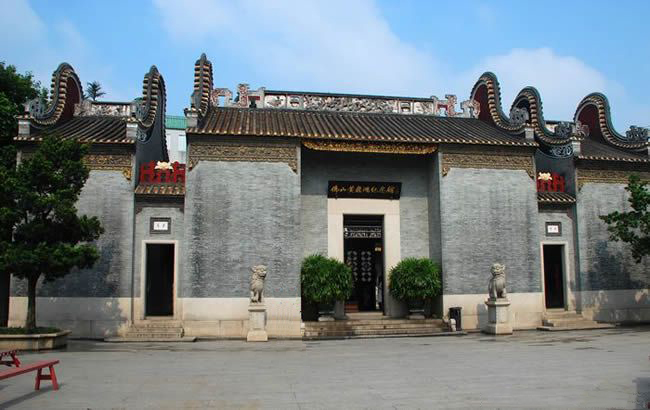

- Location within Guangdong
- Established: 14 January 2001
- Location: Chancheng District, Foshan, Guangdong, China
- Coordinates: 23.02858°N 113.1151°E
- Type: memorial

Foshan Wong Fei-hung Memorial Hall
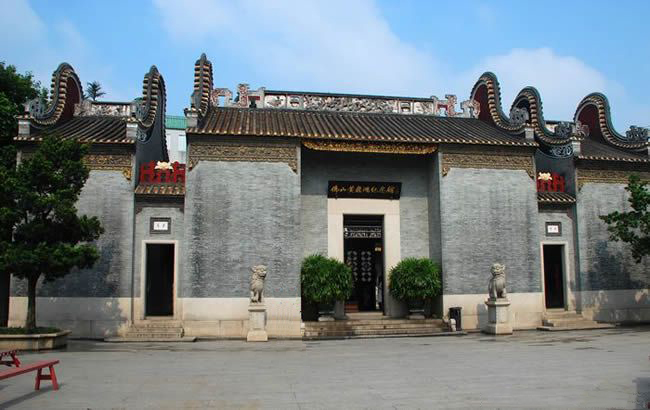
- Traditional Chinese: 佛山黃飛鴻紀念館
- Simplified Chinese: 佛山黄飞鸿纪念馆
Transcriptions
Standard Mandarin
- Hanyu Pinyin: Fóshān Huáng Fēihóng Jìniànguǎn
Yue: Cantonese
- Jyutping: Fat^{6}-Saan^{1} Wong^{4} Fei^{1}-hung^{4} Gei^{3}-nim^{6}-gun^{2}

Foshan Wong Fei-hung Memorial Hall (or Foshan Huang Feihong Memorial Hall) (佛山黄飞鸿纪念馆; 佛山黃飛鴻紀念館; Fóshān Huáng Fēihóng Jìniànguǎn; Fat^{6}-Saan^{1} Wong^{4}Fei^{1}-hung^{4} Gei^{3}-nim^{6}-gun^{2}) is a museum in memory of Wong Fei-hung.

== Background ==
Located in Xinwen Street, Zumiao Road in the Chancheng District, Foshan City, north of the Foshan Ancestral Temple in Guangdong. The museum covers an area of more than 5,000 square metres (54,000 sq ft).

The completion ceremony for the Wong Fei-hung Memorial Hall was held on January 14, 2001. Its architecture is imitation Qing Dynasty (1644–1911) style, and includes an exhibition hall, auditorium, martial arts hall, and martial arts courtyards. In the exhibition hall, apart from introducing Wong Fei-hung's life story, there is also a comprehensive display of a variety of literary, artistic works as well as thousands of cultural relics relating to Wong Fei-hung.
