= Guanyin of Mount Xiqiao =

Guanyin of the South Sea
- 西樵山南海观音
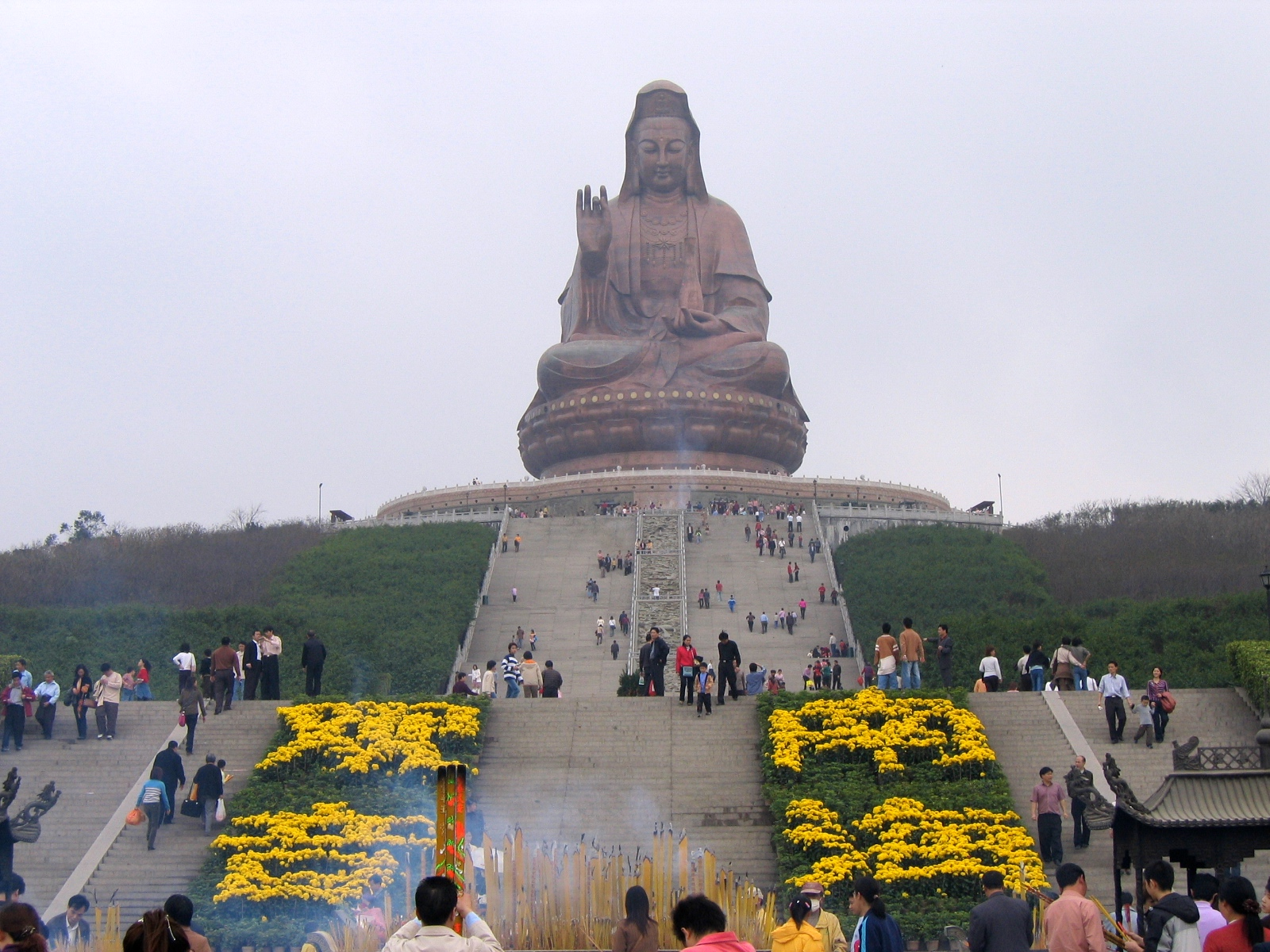
- Interactive map of Guanyin of the South Sea
- Location: Foshan, Guangdong, China
- Coordinates: 22.933101°N 112.971725°E
- Type: statue
- Height: 77 metres (253 ft)

The Guanyin of Mount Xiqiao is a colossal statue of Guanyin, on Mount Xiqiao, in Nanhai District of Foshan, Guangdong, China. This monument stands 62 m (203 ft) tall, and sits on a 15 m pedestal making a total height of 77 m (253 ft).

== See also ==
- List of tallest statues
