= Nanhai Senior High School =

Boarding school in Foshan, Guangdong

Nanhai Senior High School is a school located in Foshan, Guangdong, China. The school is located at the foot of Xiqiao Mountain, adjacent to the new Xiqiao Bridge.

Symbol of Nanhai Senior High School

== Culture ==
=== Badge ===
The school badge of Nanhai Senior High School is a floating golden flag constituted of the letters “N” and “H”, surrounded by a blue circle.

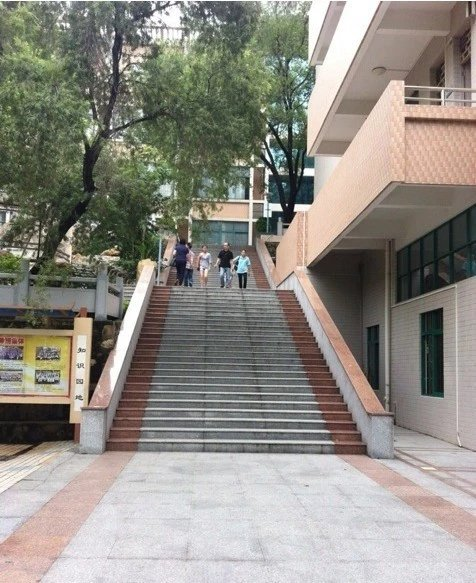
Stairwell on campus
