= Asia Aluminum =

Defunct aluminum extrusion company based in Hong Kong

Asia Aluminum Holdings Limited
- Type: Private
- Industry: Aluminum extrusion, fabrication
- Founded: 1990
- Headquarters: Hong Kong, China
- Area served: Global
- Key people: Kwong Wui Chun (Chairman)
- Products: Aluminum extruded and fabricated products

Asia Aluminum Group (AAG) is an aluminum fabrication company and one of the largest aluminum extrusion and fabrication groups in the world. Located in Asia Aluminum Industrial City, Dawang New Hi-Tech Development Zone of Guangdong Province, the company has an annual production capacity of 600,000 metric tons.

== History ==
AAG is a large aluminum profile manufacturer established in 1990. The company designs and manufactures high-precision aluminum profiles. AAG's products are used in many non-industrial applications, such as windows, doors, and curtain walls. Industrial uses include aviation, rail transportation, automobiles, electronics, and communication technology. The company's production capacity exceeds 600,000 tons per year. As part of the company's interest in quality control and production efficiency, they obtained their TS16949 and DNV certification in 2005.

AAG's products have been used in many notable buildings such as the Burj Khalifa, Burj Al Arab, Lusail Stadium, National Olympic Stadium (known as the “Bird’s Nest”), and the Beijing Capital International Airport.
