= Su Changlan =

Chinese political activist

- 苏昌兰
- Born: 1970 or 1971 (age 54–55); Guangxi
- Known for: Civil rights advocacy

Su Changlan (Chinese: 苏昌兰; pinyin: Sū Chānglán; born c. 1971) is a Chinese civil rights activist, who has worked in particular on women's rights, from Foshan, Guangdong, China.

== Background ==
Su was born in Guangxi, and worked as an elementary school teacher for over a decade. She became involved in human rights activism after local authorities seized farmland in her home village, Sanshan in Foshan, in 2005. She taught herself law, and later began to help other women seek land rights protection. Over the next few years, Su campaigned for improving the government's response to other women's rights issues, including domestic violence, sex trafficking and sexual assault, and provided legal advice to victims in those cases.

Between 2014 and 2017 she served a three-year prison sentence in Nanhai Detention Centre for "inciting subversion of state power" after posting messages on social media supporting the pro-democracy Umbrella Movement in Hong Kong.

== Imprisonment ==
Su was questioned by police on 12 September and 5 October 2014. On 27 October 2014 she was detained and taken to Nanhai Guicheng local police station by four police officers on suspicion of "picking quarrels and provoking trouble". Information about her whereabouts was withheld from her family.

On 3 December 2014, Su was formally charged with "inciting subversion" and was tried alongside fellow activist Chen Qitang in the Foshan City Intermediate People's Court on 31 March 2017. Su's guilty verdict and three-year sentence, which was dated from the first day of her detention, were announced that same day.

On 8 June 2017, the Court denied her request for an appeal hearing.

Su was held with between 50 and 70 other inmates in an 80 square-metre cell, with a sleeping space of little more than 50 cm wide, and inadequate hygiene facilities. She suffered from hyperthyroidism, heart arrhythmia, and tremors, and was hospitalized several times during her detention. Authorities denied multiple requests by Su's lawyer for bail on medical grounds.

In March 2017, Chinese Human Rights Defenders awarded Su the 2017 Cao Shunli Memorial Award for Human Rights Defenders.

On 26 October 2017, Su was released from Nanhai Detention Centre.

== International response ==
Amnesty International considered her a Prisoner of Conscience, held solely for peacefully exercising her human right to freedom of expression. They issued an Urgent Action and campaigned on her behalf. The United Nations judged Su's detention as "arbitrary", and called on the Chinese government to release and compensate her.
