= Sun Chan (Chen Shen) =

Chinese artist (1932–2017)

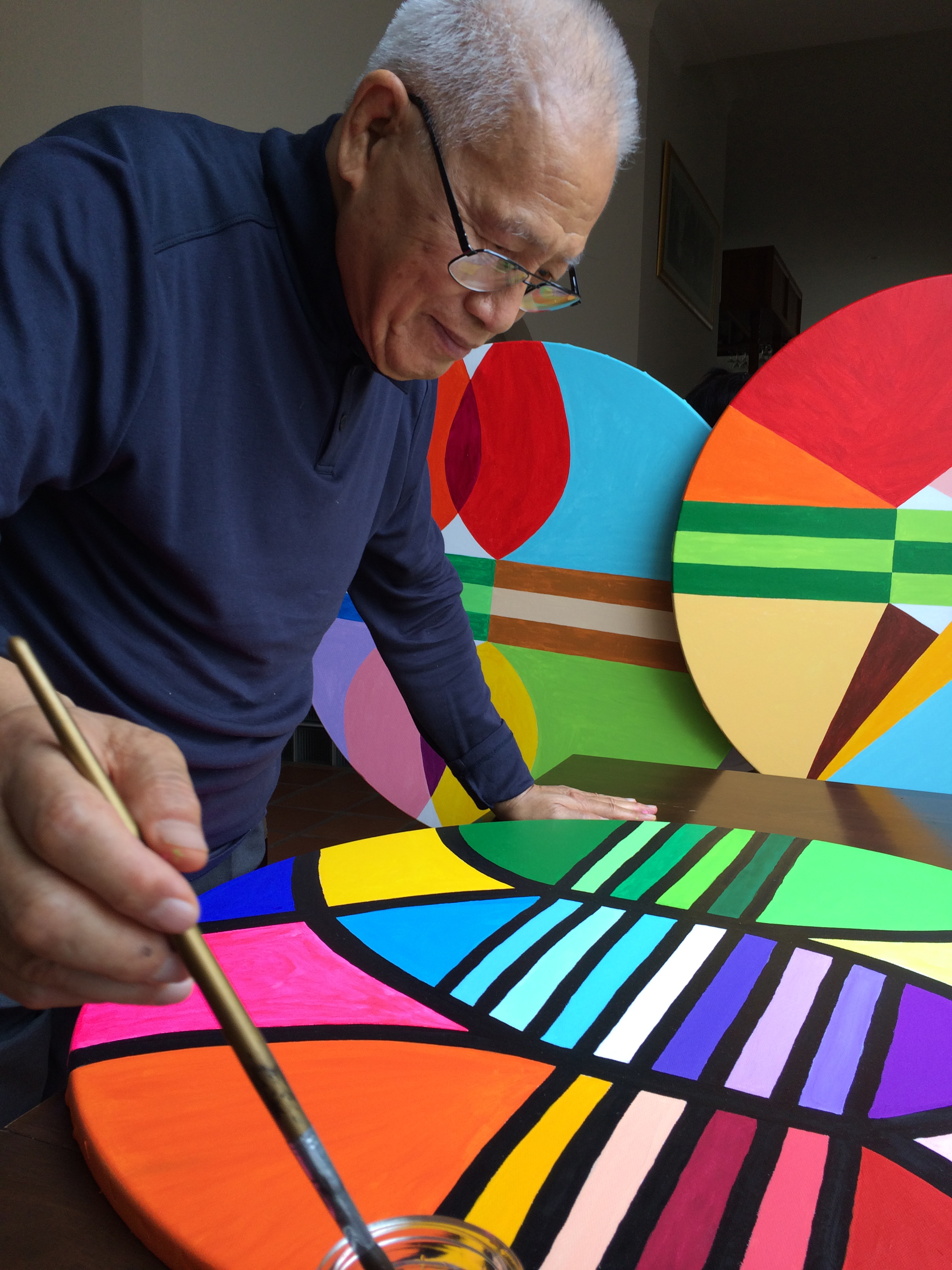
Photo of Sun Chan

Sun Chan (1932–2017) was a Chinese self-taught artist who was known for his unique Chinese character motifs. Born in Lima, Peru, in 1932 to an overseas Chinese family, he was brought back to Fóshān, Guǎngdōng China to study the Chinese language at the age of five. At this time Chan first became fascinated with Chinese characters. He had always loved calligraphy and painting but was deprived of an education after the second grade due to the break out of the Pacific War. He went through considerable hardship in the subsequent years and later moved to Hong Kong, where he worked his way from the ground up and established himself as a successful entrepreneur.

As an admirer of Chinese characters since childhood, Chan studied the Chinese writing on his own for years. He began making innovative artworks with Chinese characters to get his daughters interested in their roots, which grew into his lifelong passion. Despite his lack of formal training in art, Chan went on to explore with new visual representations for Chinese characters, and created various series of artwork throughout the years. With clean lines and vibrant colours, he transformed the Chinese script back into its pictorial form but as entirely new graphic emblems.

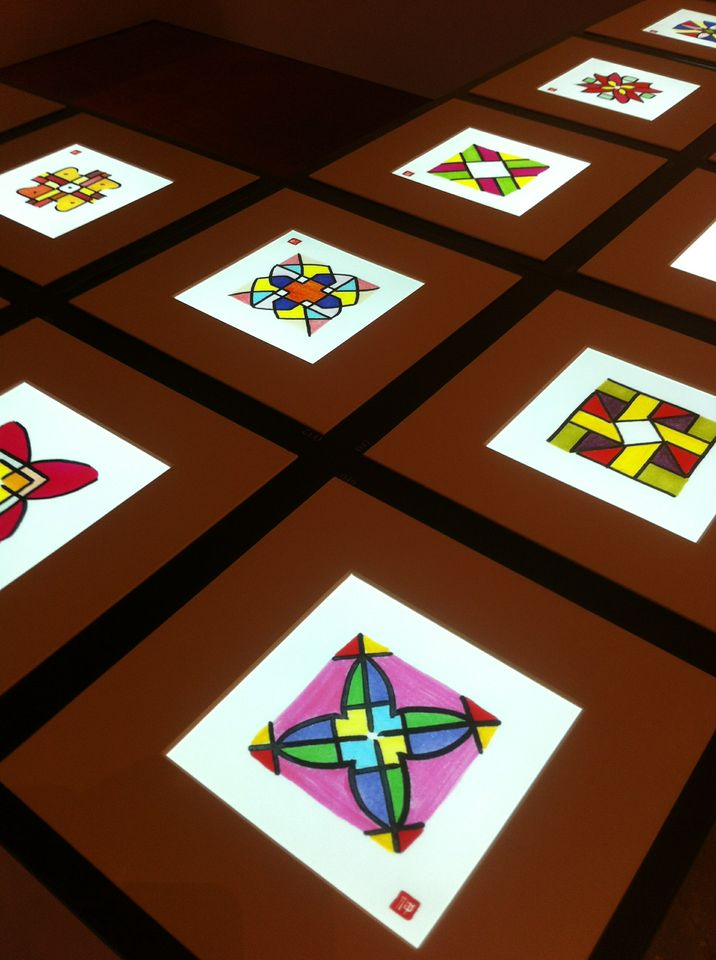
Chinese character motif artworks from Sun Chan's Huàn Xíng series

Chan's early works are mostly small drawings in pen and ink, colour pencils, pastels and markers on paper. He constantly educated and refined himself in skills, and switched to large-scale acrylic paintings in his more recent works. His artistic creations have been exhibited in Hong Kong, Taiwan, Singapore, and Paris, France.

Chan's Chinese character artworks have been made into unique wall art and installed at prestigious institutions such as the Innovation Tower of the Hong Kong Polytechnic University and the International School Academy of Hong Kong, and are also adopted in large-scale public sculptures as well as fashion/lifestyle products of an international luxury brand.

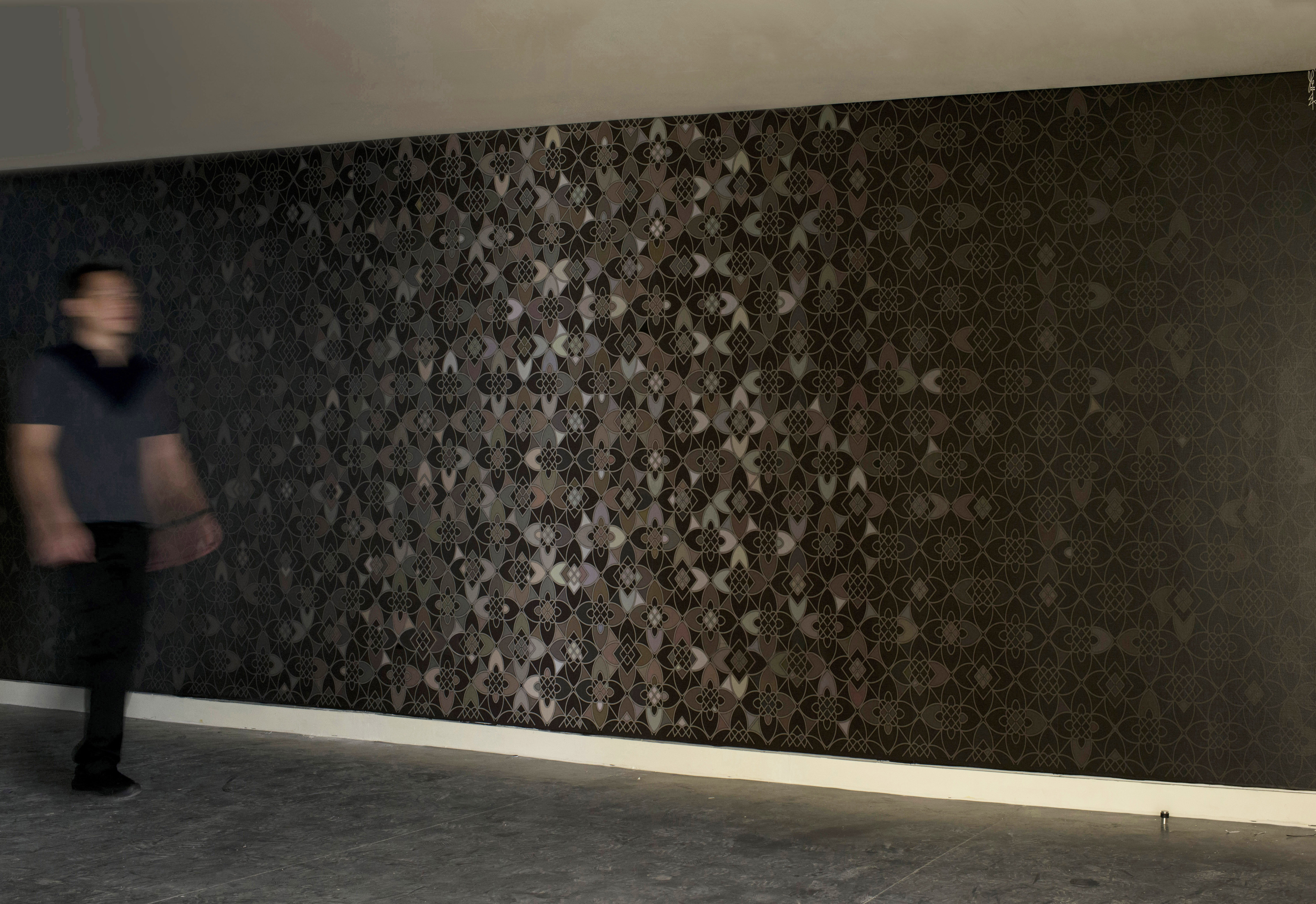
Chinese character pattern wall art by Sun Chan at J.C.DISI, Jockey Club Innovation Tower, Hong Kong Polytechnic University

His daughter, Hikoko Ito is an architect and an artist. Chan retired from his businesses moved to the Gold Coast, Australia, where he continued to produce original Chinese character artworks with a penchant for creativity.

== Art exhibitions ==
- 2017: Joy to the Words – Visual Playground of Chinese Characters II, The Arts House Singapore
- 2016: Au Delà Des Mots - La passion des caractères chinois - L’art de Sun Chan (Chén Shēn), China Cultural Centre, Paris, France
- 2016: More Than Words – Visual Playground of Chinese Characters, The Arts House Singapore
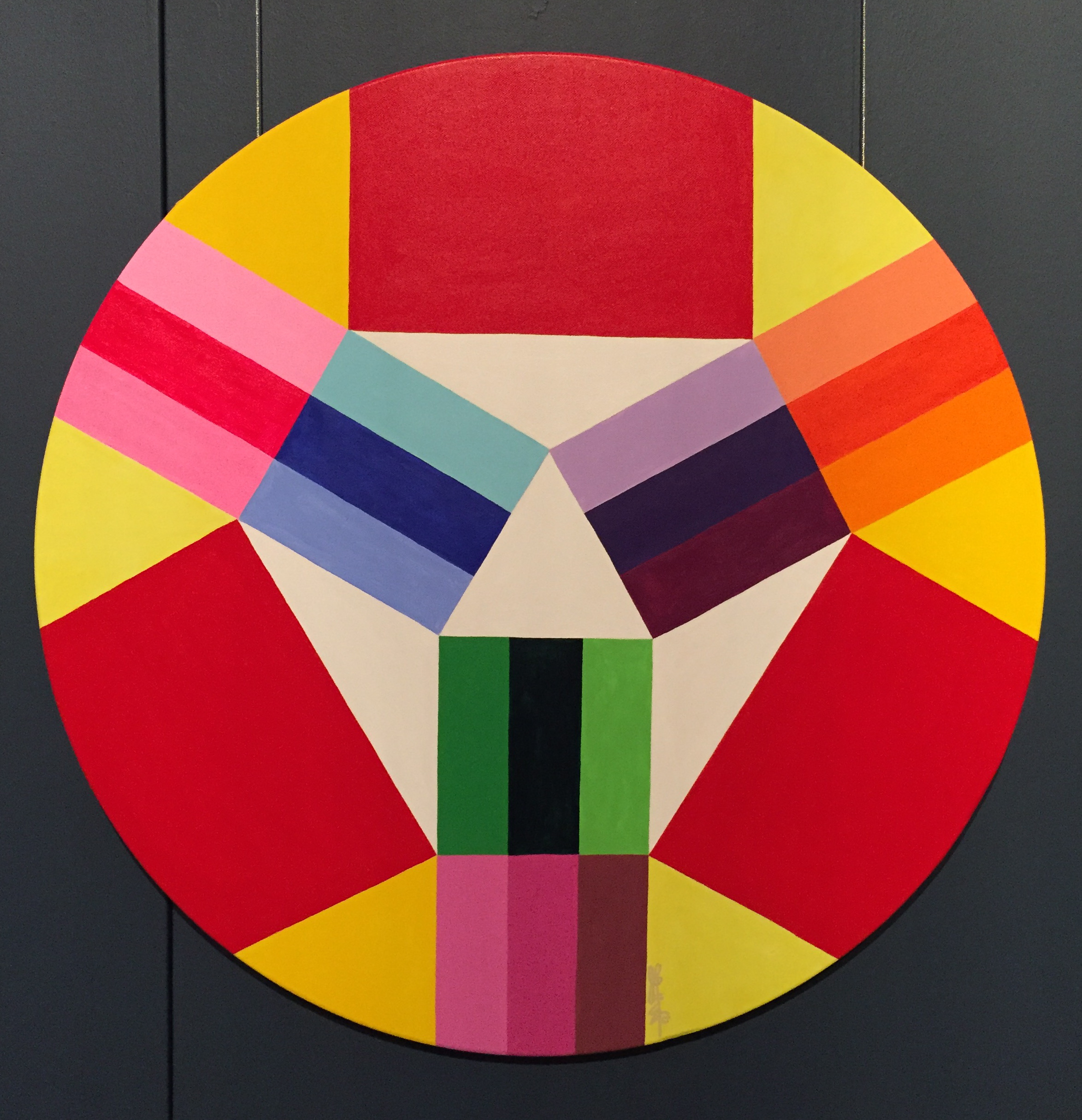
  Yuán Měi Series no. 1 (2014), acrylic paint on cotton canvas, 800mm in diameter

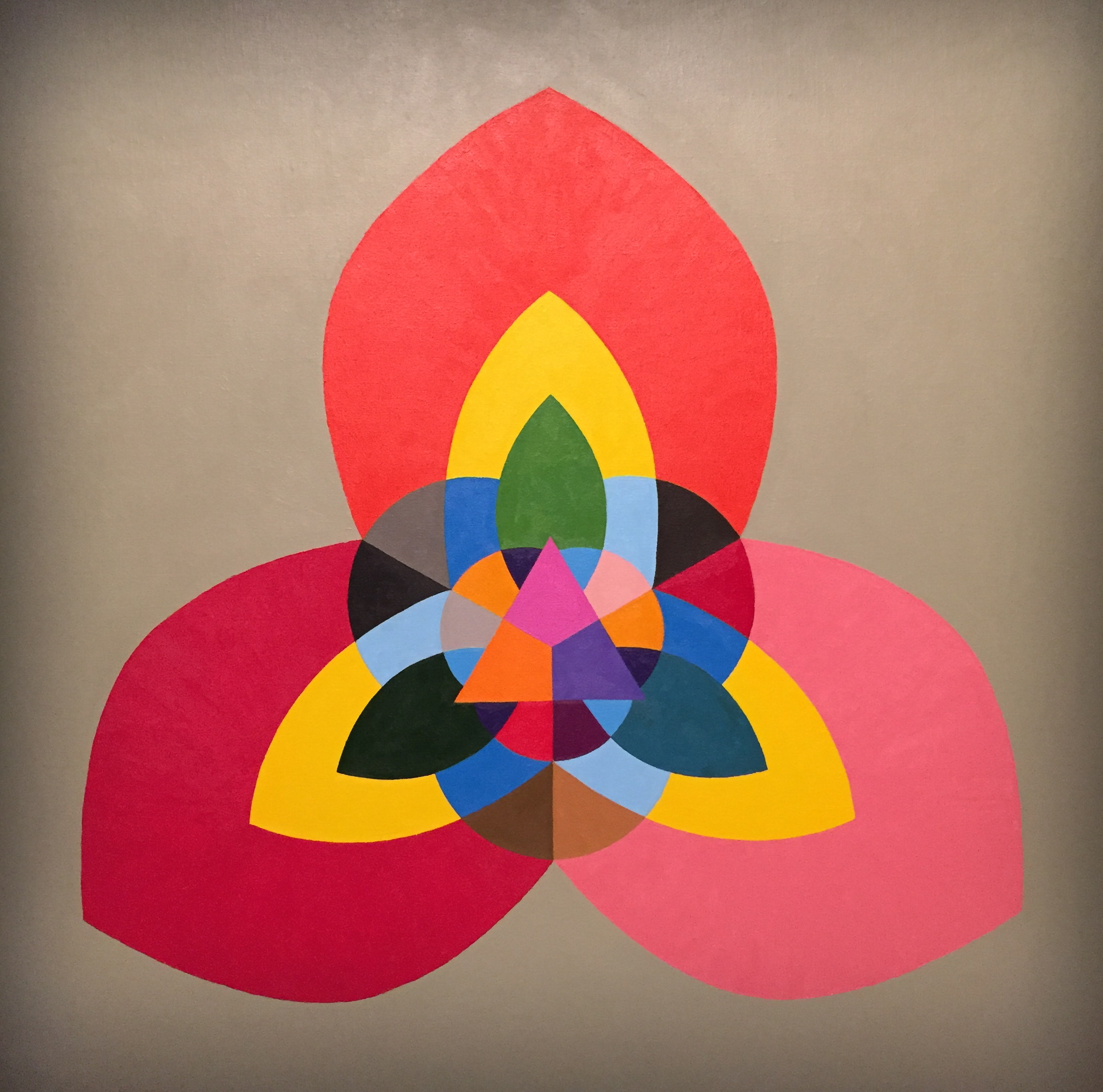
SānJiǎo Series no. 9 (2014), acrylic paint on linen canvas, 1150mm x 1150mm x 300mm

- 2014: Back to The Picture – a Visual/Verbal Interplay of Chinese Characters, HK Visual Art Center, Hong Kong
- 2013: Bi-City Biennale of Urbanism\Architecture (Hong Kong) – Beyond the Urban Edge, Kwun Tong Promenade Kowloon East Expo Site, Hong Kong
- 2013: The Talking Art – Chinese Character as Image, Pier 2 Art District, Kaohsiung, Taiwan
- 2012: The Talking Art – Chinese Character as Image, Wanchai Visual Archive, Hong Kong
