= Philip Rees (medical missionary) =

English doctor and minister

Philip Rees (8 January 1877 – 3 August 1912) M.D., M.B., B.Sc. B.A. was an English doctor and minister who travelled to China to work as a medical missionary with the Wesleyan Methodist Ministry.

== Early life ==
Rees was born on 8 January 1877 in Northampton, England, the son of the Rev. Allen Rees and his wife, Eleanore. He attended Woodhouse Grove School in Apperley Bridge, Yorkshire, and then took his B.A from the University of London via correspondence in 1895. He took his B.Sc. in 1897, and then entered Didsbury College, Bristol to study theology. He was recommended to take a position as a medical missionary with the Wesleyan Methodist Ministry in China, but financial constraints kept him from taking this up for some time.

== Career and mission to China ==
Rees won the David H. Llewellyn Scholarship at Charing Cross Hospital, which paid for his medical education fees for five years. He won the David Livingstone Scholarship during this course, as well as ten other prizes, which enabled him to continue his training toward an M.B. from the University of London. He was still preaching in and around London at the same time. He was ordained in December 1904, and was offered a mission in Foshan, China. He sailed in March 1905. He arrived in Hong Kong a month later, before making his home in Foshan, near Canton to work at the hospital there. Foshan was a booming industrial centre, with three million people in the surrounding area. Previous doctors had only lasted a year at the hospital due to overwork. There were considerable language issues, and an adjustment to the climate. Rees felt isolated and alone, suffering from overwork and homesickness. Visits to Hong Kong and the English community there encouraged him to persist with his religious and medical work. He was transferred to the Wuzhou hospital after one of his colleagues fell ill.

Rees married Ethel Craske of London in Hong Kong, in December 1907. They made their home in Wuzhou. Their son, Allen Rees was born in 1909. Rees published in the medical journal, The Lancet in 1908 describing the primitive knowledge of midwifery practised by some of the village people he met. Rees' health was suffering considerably from the strains of his work and their life in China. They sailed for England in February 1910, staying with his wife, Ethel's family in Battersea, London. He used this time in England to recuperate from malaria and complete his M.D. degree from the University of London. He continued to preach extensively throughout England. Doctors were not happy however regarding his health which had suffered consistently in China.

The Rees' returned to China in September 1911, their daughter, Nancy Rees having been born in England in October 1910. The Chinese Revolt of 1911 had the Imperial army engaged in fighting with revolutionary soldiers near Wuzhou, which increased the number of patients being admitted to the hospital. Rees' health continued to decline and following a vacation to Hong Kong, he suffered from an acute attack of appendicitis. It progressed to peritonitis and Rees died on 3 August 1912.

Rees was survived by his wife and children, who returned to England.
