= Kwong Wui Chun =

Hong Kong businessman

- Born: Nanhai District, Foshan, Guangdong, China
- Occupation: Businessperson

Chinese name
- Traditional Chinese: 鄺滙珍
- Simplified Chinese: 邝汇珍
- Hanyu Pinyin: Kuàng Huìzhēn
- Yale Romanization: Kwong Wuihjān
- Jyutping: Kwong3 Wui6-zān

Kwong Wui Chun (born c. 1955) is a Hong Kong aluminum businessman. He is the chairman and founder of Asia Aluminum Group, and chairman of the Guangdong Nanhai Non-ferrous Metals Association. He was born in Nanhai District, Foshan, Guangdong, and moved to Hong Kong in the 1960s or 1970s. In 1981 he began buying scrap aluminum in the United States, Japan, and the Middle East, and importing it for resale in Hong Kong and for further processing in Guangzhou. He founded the Asia Aluminum Group in 1990, and shepherded the company through its listing on the Stock Exchange of Hong Kong in 1998. In 2003 he was reported to be the 148th-richest person in China.
