= Quan Hansheng =

Quan Hansheng (simplified Chinese: 全汉升; traditional Chinese: 全漢昇; pinyin: Quán Hànshēng; Wade–Giles: Chu'an Han-Sheng, Chuan Han-Sheng; Pe̍h-ōe-jī: Choân Hàn-seng; September 19, 1912 – November 29, 2001) was a Chinese economic historian. Quan's research focused on Chinese monetary history, commodity prices and foreign trade. He elected an Academician of Academia Sinica in 1984, and he held professorships at National Taiwan University and The Chinese University of Hong Kong.

== Early years ==
Quan was born in Shunde, Guangdong, on September 19, 1912. The family moved to Foshan in 1915, where he received primary private education, and then to Guangzhou in 1926, where he attended the Guangzhou No.1 Middle School. After graduation he went to Peking University in Beijing, reading history.

In 1944, Quan was invited to study at Columbia University, Harvard, and Chicago University, respectively. He went back to China in 1947 and taught at National Central University in Nanjing.

Quan was the dean of New Asia College from 1975 to 1977. He died on November 29, 2001, in Taipei.

== Major works ==
1. 中國行會制度史，上海：新生命書局，Shanghai 1934
2. 唐宋帝國與運河，中央研究院歷史語言研究所專刊之 24 ，重慶：商務印書館，Chongqing 1944
3. 漢冶萍公司史略，香港：香港中文大學，Hong Kong 1972
4. 中國經濟史論叢，香港：新亞研究所，Hong Kong 1972
5. Mid-Ch'ing Rice Markets and Trade: An Essay in Price History (co-authored Richard A. Kraus), Cambridge, Mass. : East Asian Research Center, Harvard University, 1975
6. 中國經濟史研究，香港：新亞研究所，Hong Kong 1976
7. 明清經濟史研究，臺北：聯經出版公司，Taipei 1987
8. 中國近代經濟史論叢，臺北：稻禾出版社，Taipei 1996
