= Crowne Plaza Foshan Hotel =

Hotel in Foshan, Guangdong, China

Coordinates: 23.025021°N 113.109172°E

The Crowne Plaza Foshan is a hotel in Foshan, Guangdong. It opened in 1987 as the Foshan Hotel (simplified Chinese: 佛山宾馆; traditional Chinese: 佛山賓館; pinyin: Fóshān Bīnguǎn). Located in the heart of the Pearl River Delta, Foshan is an old town that has recently seen a transformation brought about by China's booming economy.

== History ==
The hotel became the Crowne Plaza Foshan in December 2008 and is now managed by the InterContinental Hotels Group
