= Mount Xiqiao =

Extinct volcano near Nanhai District, Guangdong, China

Coordinates: 22°55′38″N 112°58′22″E

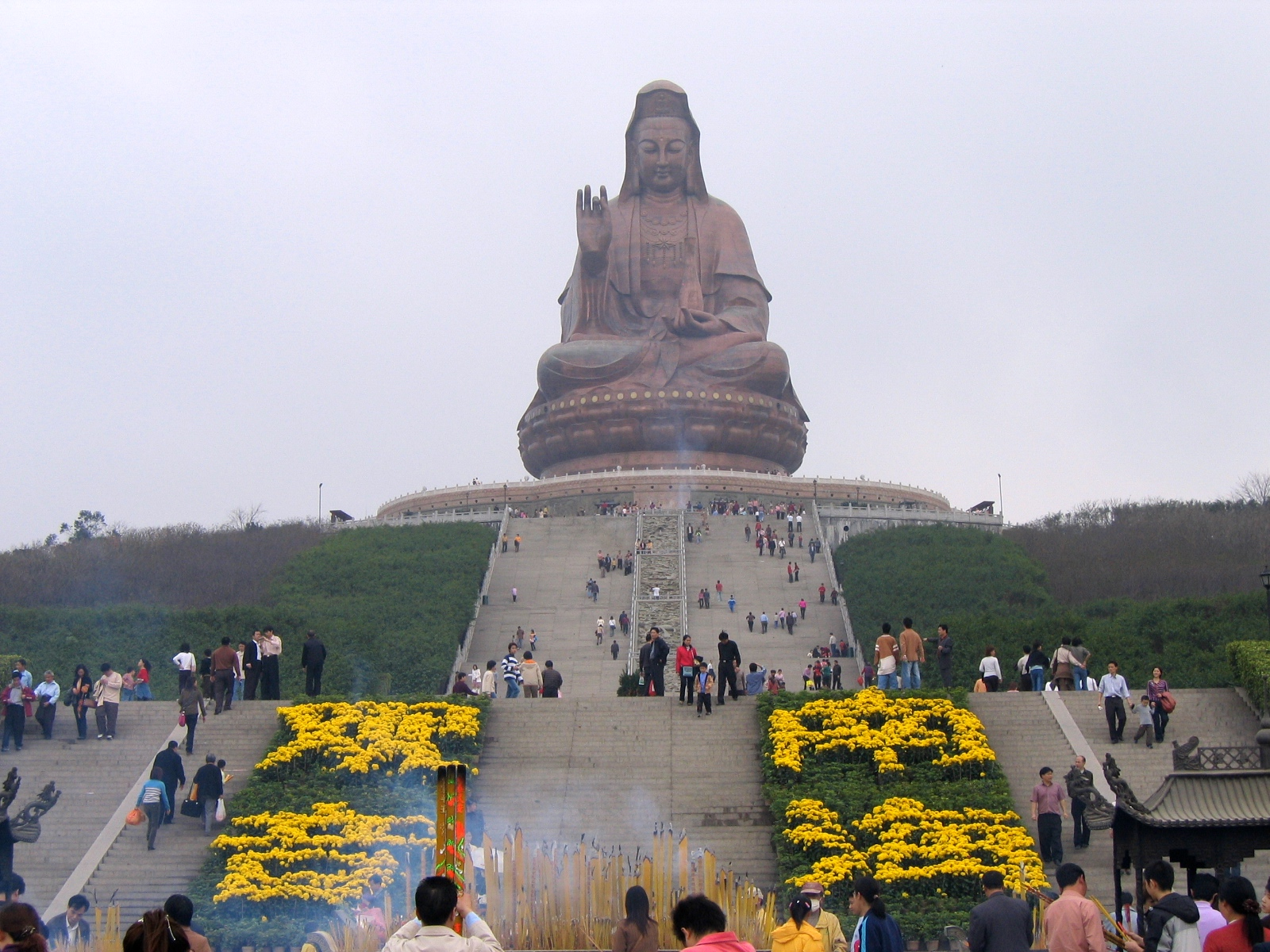
- Guanyin statue at the summit of Mount Xiqiao

Highest point
- Elevation: 346 m (1,135 ft)

Geography
- Location: Foshan City, Guangdong, People's Republic of China

Geology
- Rock age: 40–50 million years
- Mountain type: Extinct volcano

Mount Xiqiao
- Chinese: 西樵山
- Literal meaning: West firewood mountain
Transcriptions
Standard Mandarin
- Hanyu Pinyin: Xīqiáo Shān
- Wade–Giles: Hsi-ch'iao Shan
Yue: Cantonese
- Yale Romanization: sāi chìuh sāan
- Jyutping: Sai^{1}ciu^{4} Saan^{1}

Mount Xiqiao is a 40- to 50-million-year-old extinct volcano situated in the south west of the Nanhai District, Foshan, Guangdong, People's Republic of China 68 km (42 mi) from Guangzhou. The mountain is an important scenic area and designated as a national forest park and national geological park. Covering an area of 14 square kilometres (5.4 sq mi), the area features a total of 72 peaks with the highest, Dacheng Peak (大秤峰), rising to 346 m (1,135 ft).

== Geology ==
From 40–50 million years ago, the entire Pearl River Delta was an ancient bay where a volcanic eruption ejected a large quantity of lava into the sea. On cooling, the molten rock formed a conical mountain; the embryonic form of Mount Xiqiao. Thereafter eruptions of lava continued and produced the current 72 peaks. After several million years of erosion by the sea, the area flattened and was gradually colonized by vegetation.

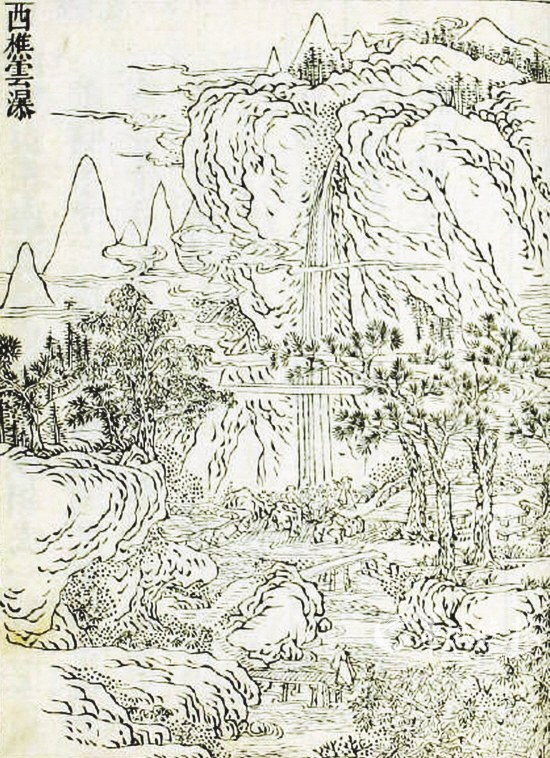
The Yunya Feipu from a Qing edition of the Eight Views of Guangzhou

== Scenery ==
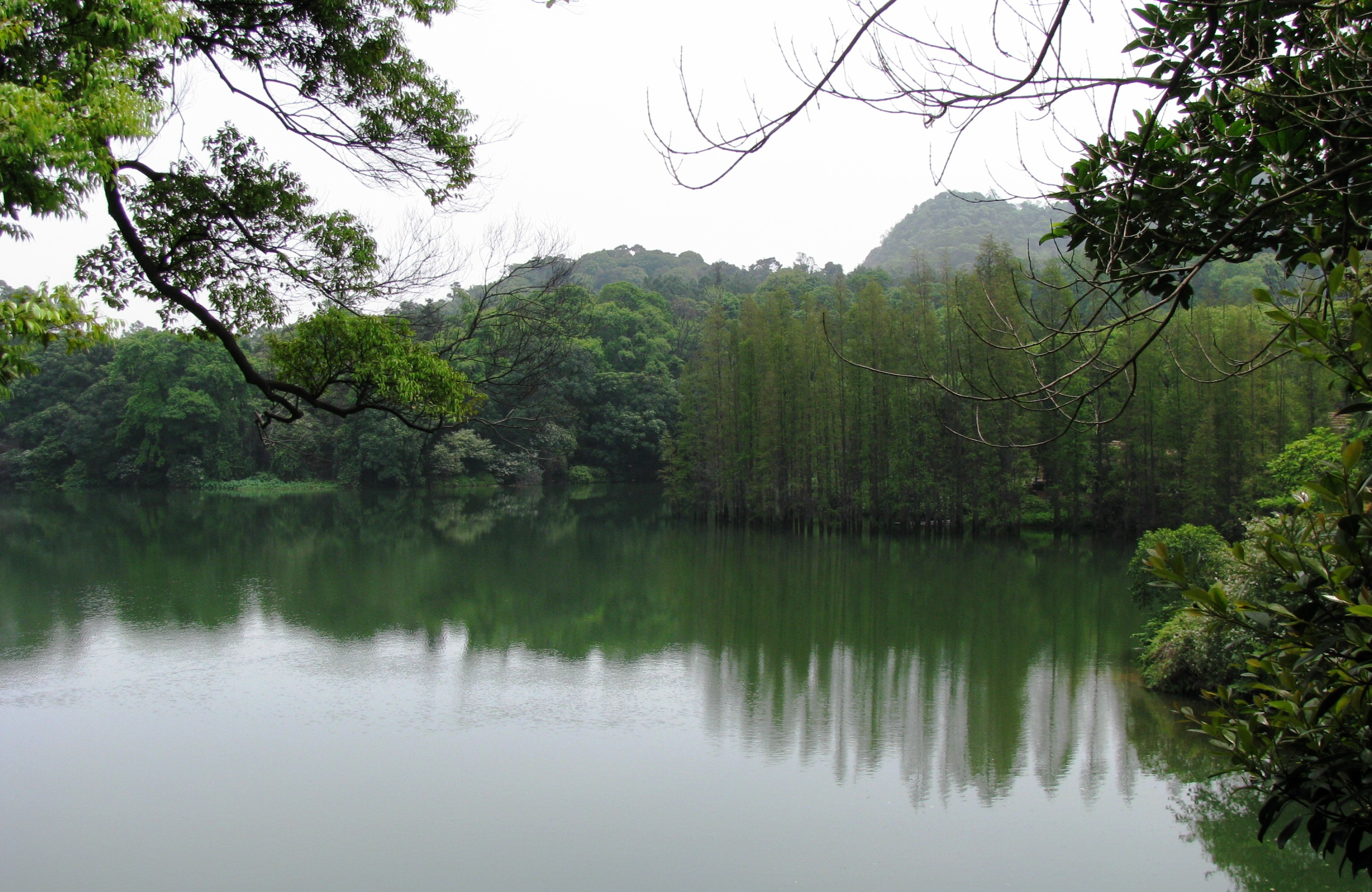
Mount Xiqiao scenery

Mount Xiqiao features unusual scenery with strange rock formations and a profusion of fresh water springs as well as 42 natural caves. In total there are 232 springs and 28 waterfalls including the Yunya Feipu (Chinese: 云崖飞瀑; lit. 'Waterfall from Cliffs High in the Clouds'), one of the Eight Views of Guangzhou during the 18th-century Qianlong Era.

== Cultural background ==
As early as 6,000 to 8,000 years ago, human activity in the Mount Xiqiao area created a "Twin shoulder stone tool culture" (双肩石器文化) that featured delicate stone tools including twin-shouldered stone axes. This greatly influenced development of culture around the Pearl River.

During the Ming and Qing Dynasties, a number of scholars including Zhan Ruoshui and He Baiyun (何白云) lived in seclusion on the mountain where they studied Neo-Confucianism and painting. Amongst the most famous scholars was Chinese nationalist Kang Youwei who began planning the 1898 Hundred Days' Reform movement at Mount Xiqiao. Chinese martial artist Huang Feihong was born in the area, where he developed the Nanquan or "southern fist" fighting style.

== Sightseeing areas ==
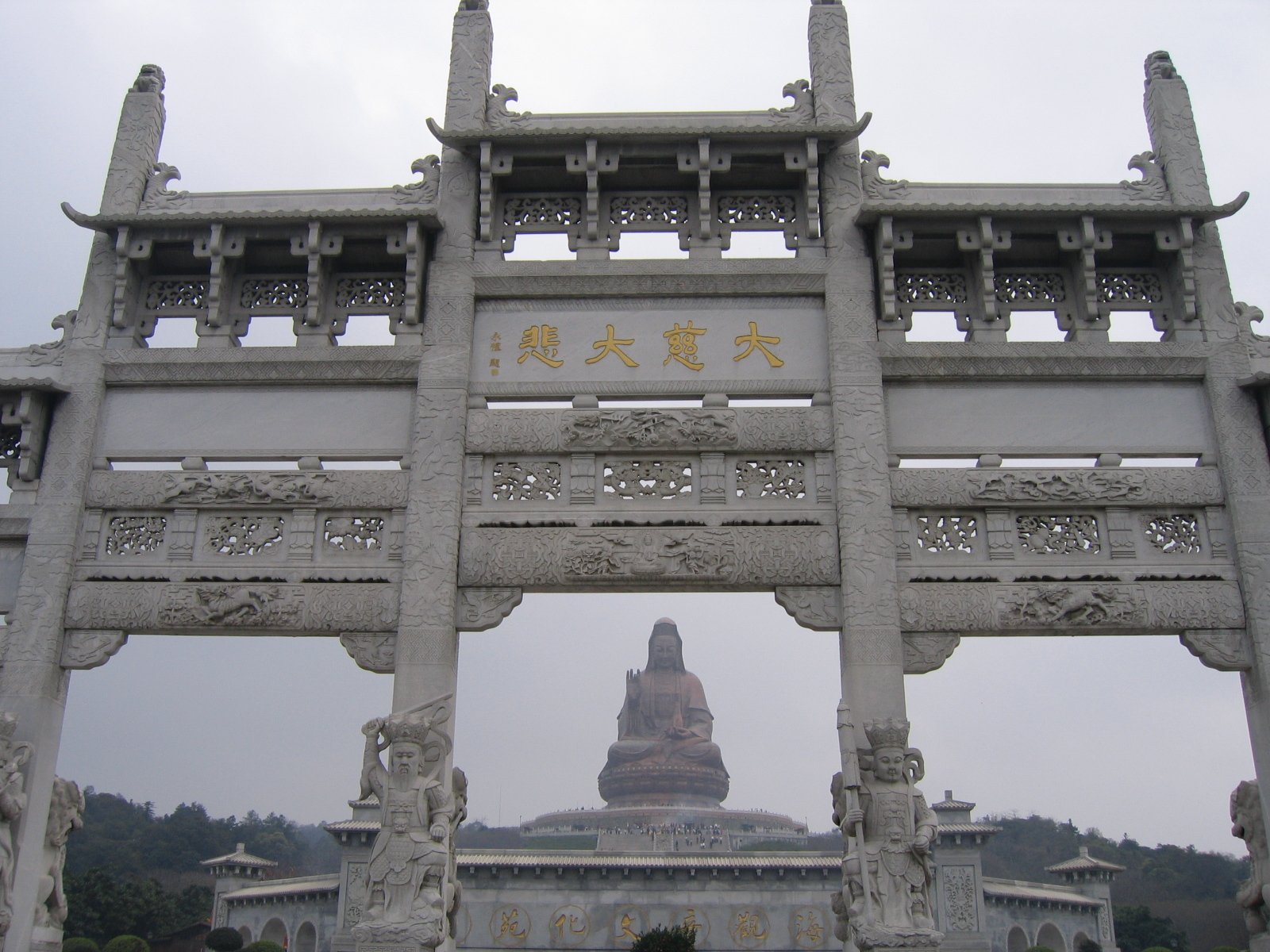
Guanyin Memorial Arch

Today, Xiqiao Mountain is divided into ten major scenic areas including the Nanhai Guanyin Culture Park, which contains a 66 m (217 ft) statue of the goddess Guanyin, the Baiyun Caves (白云洞), and the Baofeng Temple (宝峰寺).
