= Pan Kou-ang =

Taiwanese sports shooter (born 1939)

Personal information
- Born: 潘 光, Pinyin: Pān Guāng; 8 December 1939 (age 86) Nanhai, China

Sport
- Sport: Sports shooting

Pan Kou-ang (born 8 December 1939) is a Taiwanese former sports shooter. He competed at the 1964 Summer Olympics and the 1968 Summer Olympics. He also competed at the 1966 Asian Games.
