= Hu Zaobin =

Chinese artist (1897–1942)

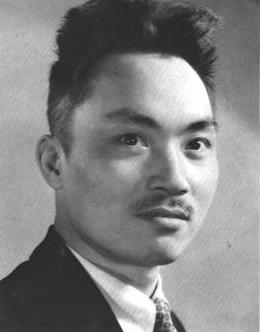
Hu Zaobin 1897-1942

Righteousness Permits No Turning Back – Hong Kong Art Museum Exhibit

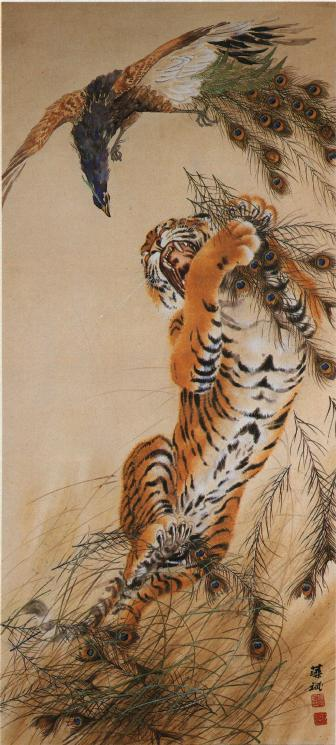
Victory or Defeat – Museu de Arte de Macau Exhibit

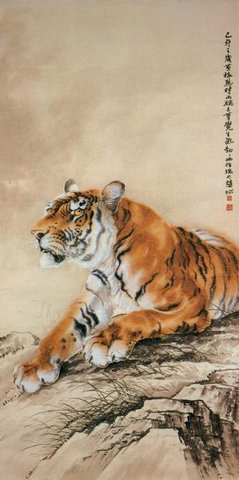
National Palace Museum

Wu Cho Bun (Chinese: 胡藻斌; 1897–1942) was an early 20th-century Chinese painter, famous for painting tigers.

== Early life ==
Wu Cho Bun was born in the Shunde Prefecture, Guangdong Province in 1897. Hu studied art in Republic of China and later went abroad to Japan to study Western fine arts at the Kyoto Municipal Art Institute where he developed his now distinctive and famous style of painting the tiger.

== Painting career ==
In 1915, Wu founded the Yeuk Yue Painting Research Institute at Si Pai-lou, Guangzhou with Feng Laiqiu. Yue Sze Art school was later established on Guongta Street in the same city a year later. In 1922, he was appointed as the Northern Expedition Army's Head Political Department Director of Publicity in the Art section.

In 1928, he went on a tour within Southeast Asia in which he observed and took many photographs of wildlife that became references in his later work. In 1931, Wu started working in Singapore as the art editor for the Singapore Daily.

In 1933, Wu returned to Guangzhou with his second wife and their children. They then moved to Shanghai with Wu's first family. He established Xingxiang Art Society along with Zhu Fengzhu and presented Chinese modern painting exhibitions with Wang Yiting, Zhang Yuguang, and Zhang Xiaolou.

When the Marco Polo Bridge Incident ignited the war between China and Japan, Hu held an exhibit to raise fund for the victims in Sichuan and Suiyuan provinces. When Shanghai fell to Japanese troops, Hu moved his family to Hong Kong and worked as an art teacher at Southwest (Sai Nam) Middle School.

== Personal ==
In 1914, he became active in the Kuomintang (Nationalist Party) and married his first wife, Tan Fun-kwei in an arranged marriage. They had four daughters, three of whom survived childhood.

In 1933, he met his second wife, Ng Wai-chun in Singapore and they got married. Together, they bore three daughters and one son.

== Death ==
When the Japanese troops occupied Hong Kong in 1942. Wu attempted to sneak back into rural China with his family but despite his disguise, he was caught and had his paintings confiscated. He was pressured to help with the Japanese propaganda campaign but refused. Hu somehow managed to sneak out to Gianmun and later to Haipeng. He was infected by a deadly disease there and died at the age of 45 with his family beside him. Righteousness Permits No Turning Back was finished during that time.

Wu's family later emigrated to Canada and the United States.

== Art exhibition ==
His widow Ng Wai-chun donated the painting Righteousness Permits No Turning Back to the Hong Kong Museum of Art after the art exhibition of Hu Zaobin concluded in August 1987. It is currently on display at the 4th floor of Hong Kong Museum of Art.

In 2010, Macau Museum of Art hosted a memorial art exhibition for Hu Zaobin for a period of six weeks beginning April 30. After the conclusion of this exhibition, his family donated 10 pieces of art works to the Macau Museum of Art for public viewing. A book of his artwork will also be publish to celebrate this event.

In 2016, Hu Zaobin's only son, Chie Hong Wu, donated all of Hu's painting to the National Palace Museum as per his mother's last request. The donated pieces would be stored in an ideal location for public viewing for a long time. It would also established his artistic achievement. In addition, it would enable Lingnan painting to reach another milestone.
