= Foshan Ancestral Temple =

Taoist temple in Foshan, China

Coordinates: 23.035151°N 113.116307°E

- Chinese: 佛山祖庙
Transcriptions
Standard Mandarin
- Hanyu Pinyin: Fóshān Zǔmiào
Yue: Cantonese
- Jyutping: Fat^{6}-saan^{1} Zou^{2}-miu^{2}

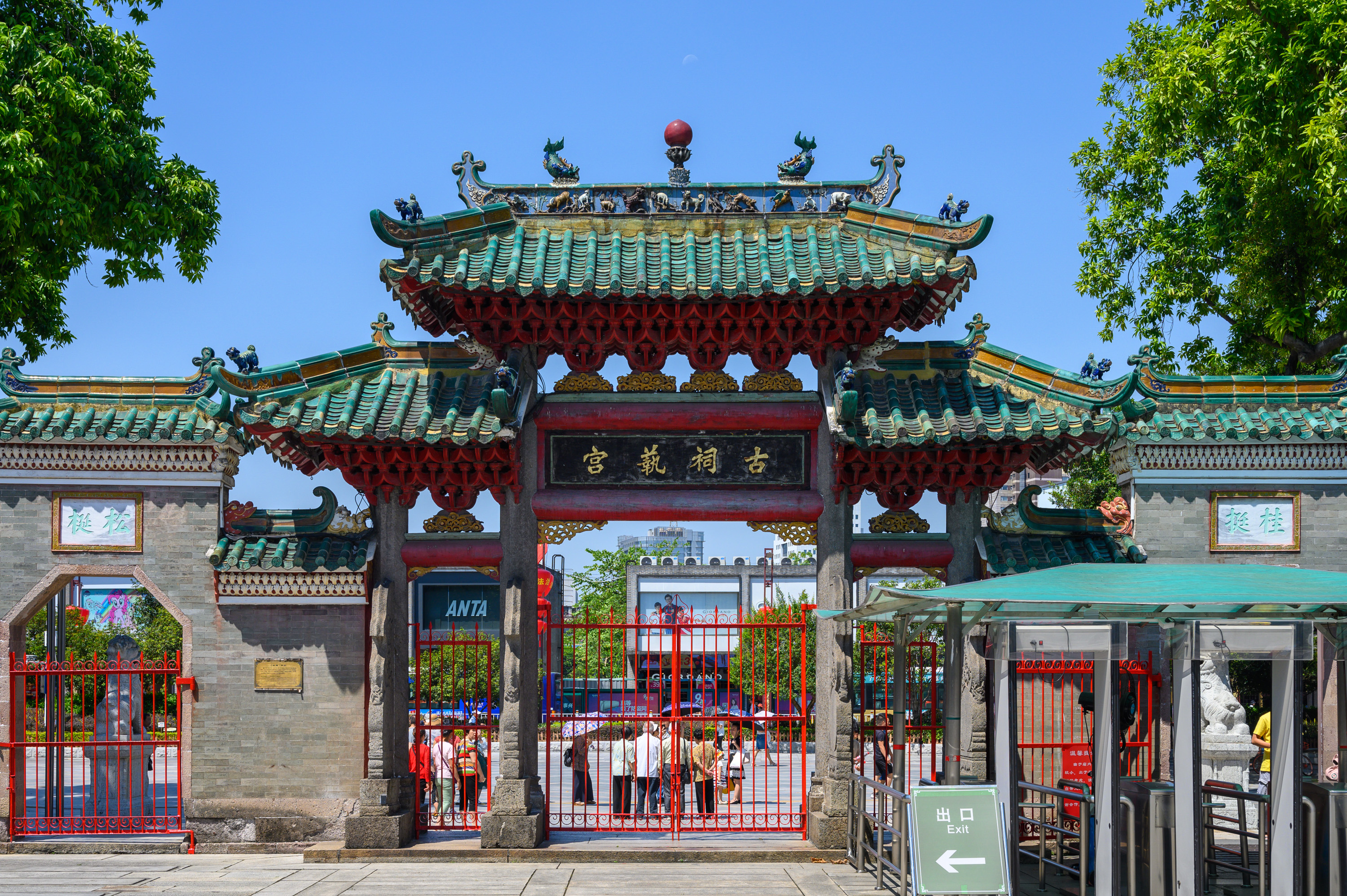
The Paifang at the entrance of the temple

Foshan Ancestral Temple aka. Foshan Zumiao is a Daoist temple in Foshan, Guangdong, China. It is a national AAAA tourist attraction approved by the China National Tourism Administration, covering an area of 25,000 square metres (270,000 sq ft). Foshan Ancestral Temple captures a million visitors at home and abroad every year with its well preserved ancient construction complex and its luxuriant folk culture. Foreign leaders and celebrities of various counties are frequent visitors to the temple.

== History ==
It was first built in the Song dynasty during the reign of Emperor Zhezong, in the Yuanfeng Era (1078-1085), but was ruined towards the end of the Yuan Dynasty. It was rebuilt in the 5th year of the Hongwu Era of the Ming Dynasty (1372). The temple is dedicated to Beidi (the "Northern God"), a Cantonese form of the "Dark Warrior" Xuanwu, who is said to have power over the waters of Guangdong.

After the foundation of the People's Republic of China in 1949, the temple was converted into Foshan Municipal Museum and listed as one of the main cultural relics under the preservation by the Guangdong provincial government.

== Architecture ==
Foshan Ancestral Temple consists of Ancestral Temple, Confucius Temple (孔庙), Huang Feihong Memorial Hall (黄飞鸿纪念馆) and Ip Man Hall (叶问堂).

The Ancestral Temple worships the Taoist deity Xuan Wu, known as the Northern Emperor. The ancient building was built in the 11th century, and now is a key cultural relic protected by the State Council. It opened for a visit in 1956.

The Confucius Temple was constructed in 1911. It is an important place for people to admire the eminent ancient Chinese educator Confucius. The historic site is protected by the Foshan Municipal Government and received visitors since 1981.

Huang Feihong Memorial Hall and Ip Man Hall were newly founded in the first year of the 21st century to commemorate two Foshan born martial art masters Huang Feihong and Ip Man.

== Culture ==
Foshan Ancestral Temple culture includes Taoism culture, martial art, and folk art. Moreover, different kinds of folk culture activities are held every year, for instance, Spring Blessing Ceremony, Temple Fair, Community Drinking Rituals and Mid-Autumn Festival. There are also other interactive folk-custom activities such as the Preschool Children Enlightening Ceremony, Lion Dance, Cantonese Opera, Foshan Martial Art Performance and Cantonese Opera. Such activities are held all year-round.

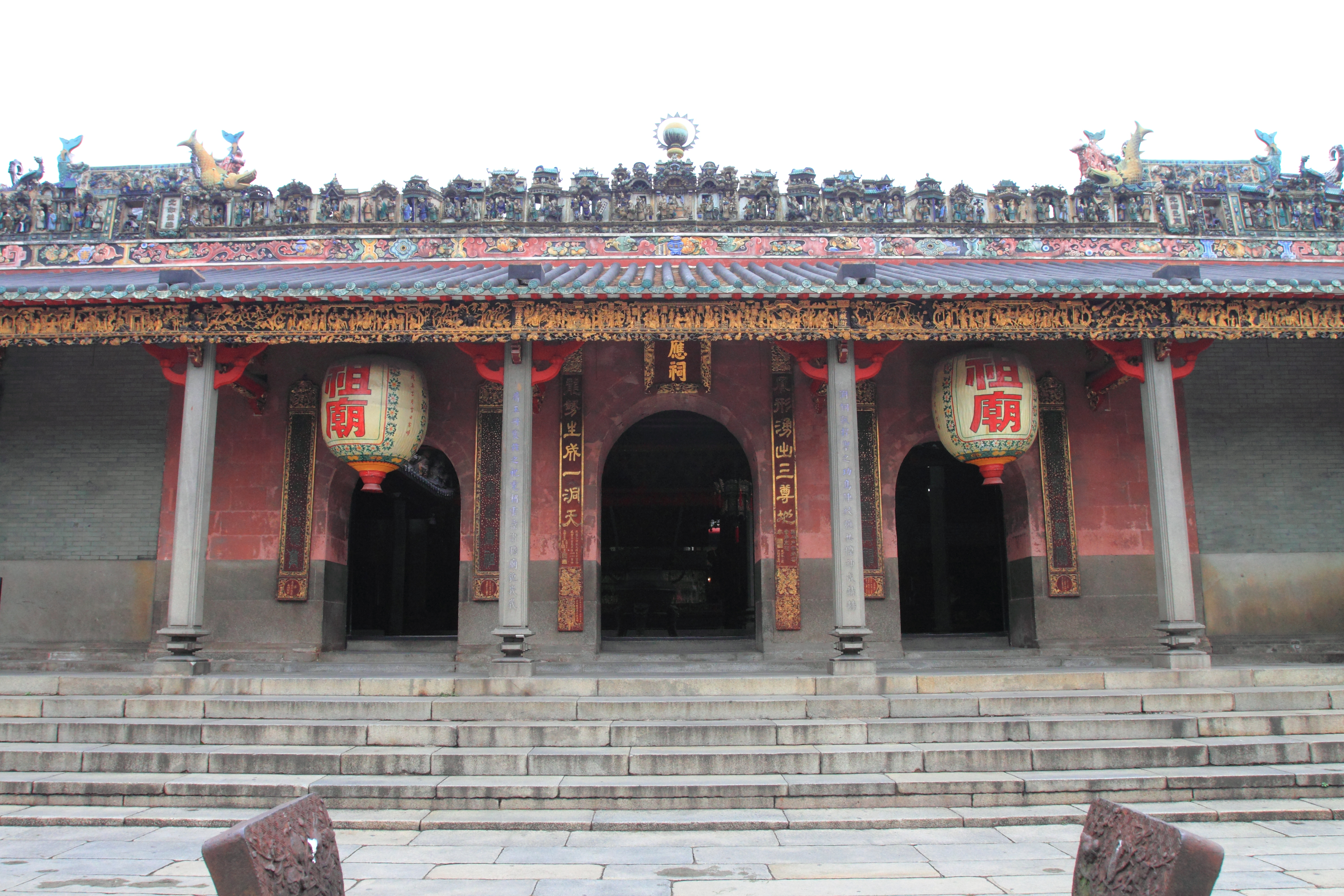

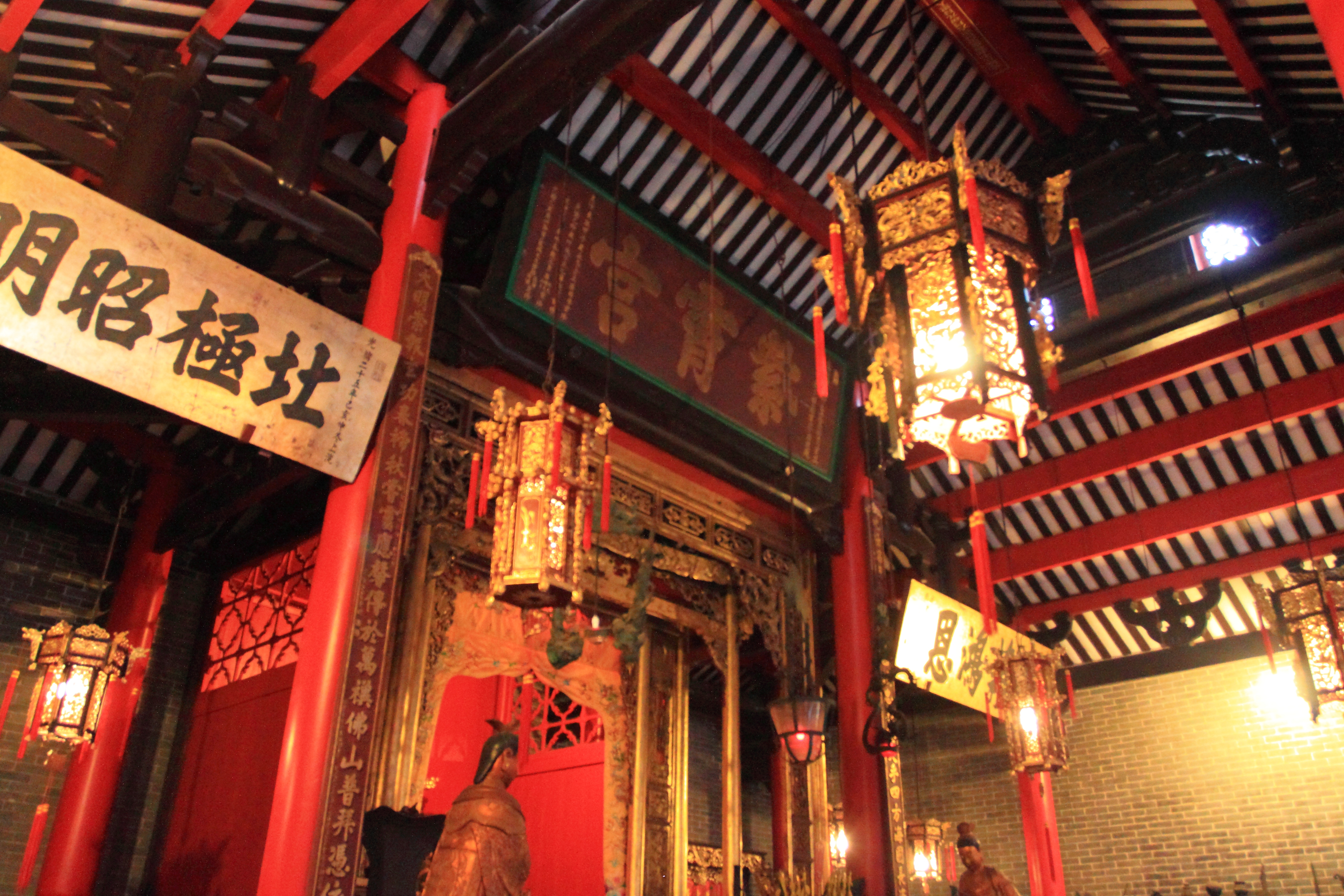

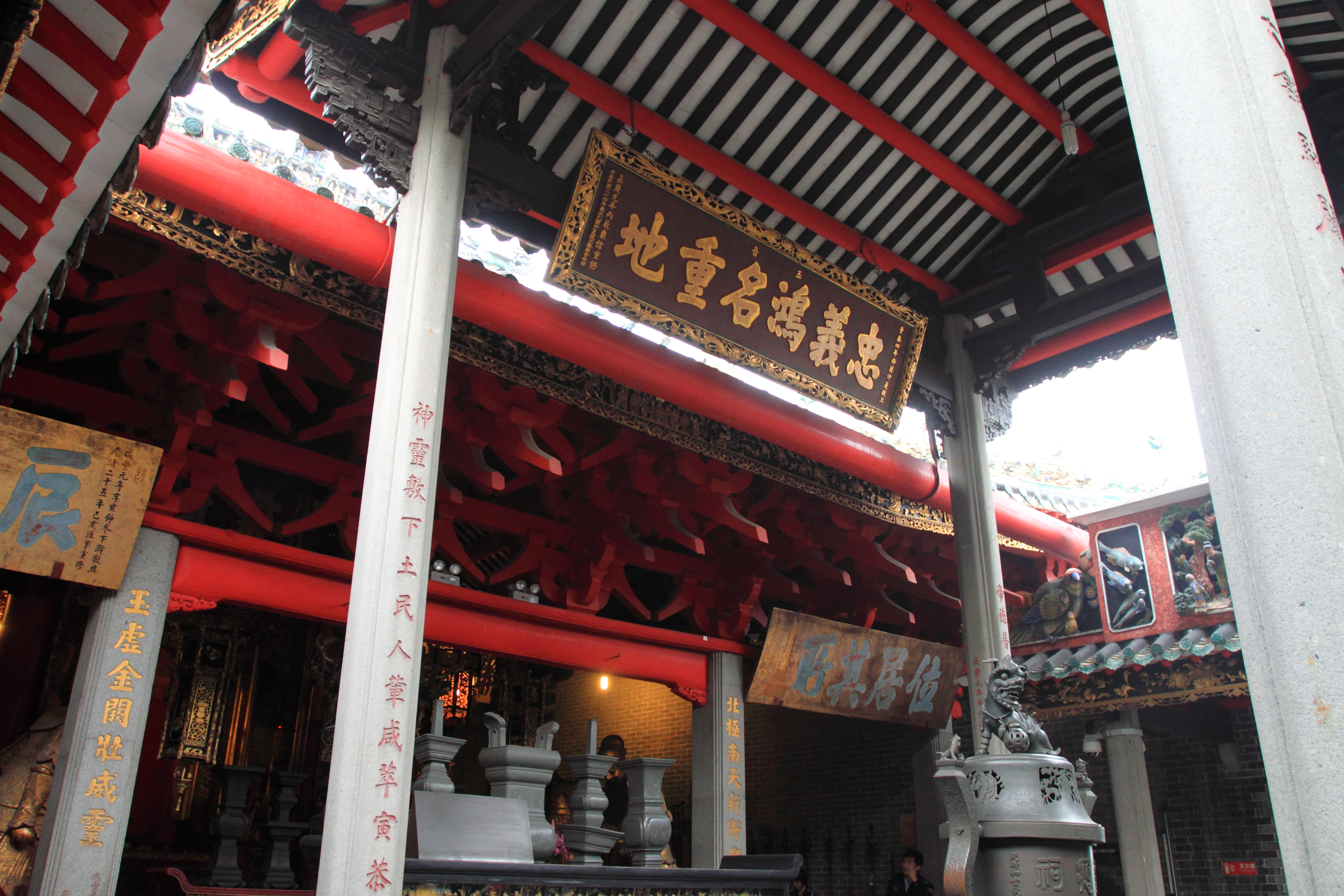

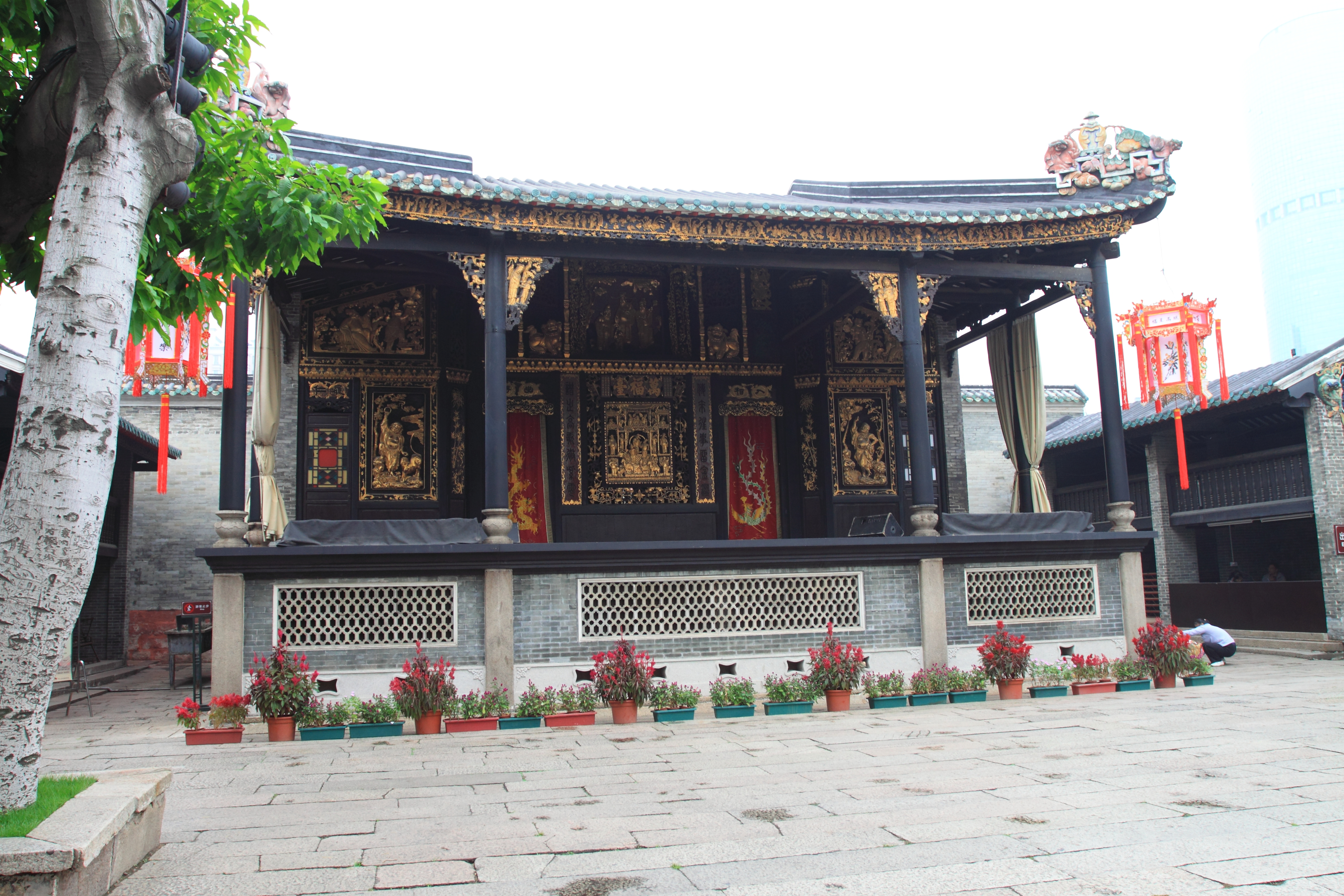

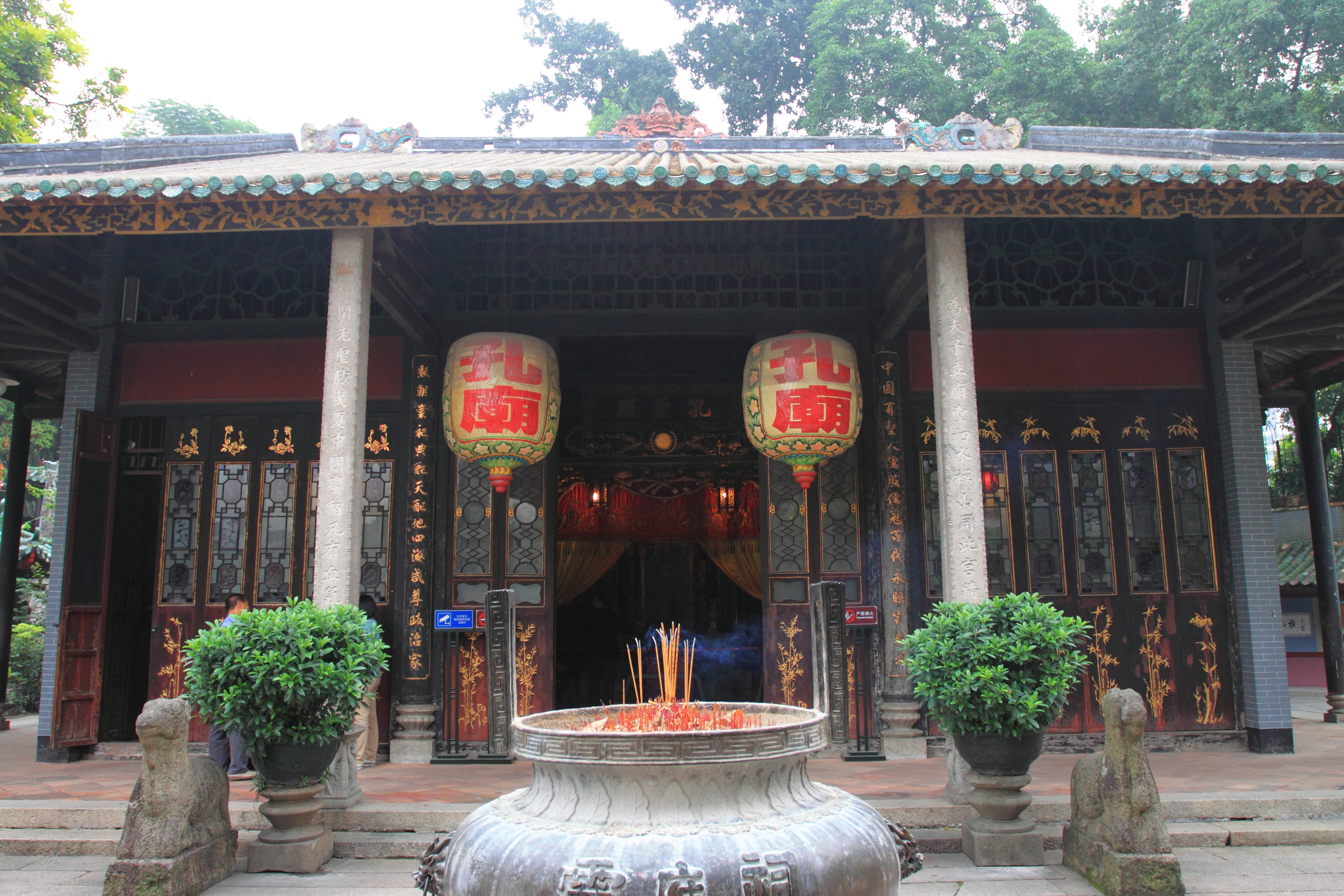
Confucius Temple
