= Chris Pang =

Australian actor

- Born: Christopher Pang; 29 December 1984 (age 41); Melbourne, Victoria, Australia
- Citizenship: Australia
- Occupations: Actor; producer
- Years active: 2008–present
- Parents: Barry Pang (father); Anne Pang (mother)

Chinese name
- Traditional Chinese: 吳育剛
- Simplified Chinese: 吴育刚
Transcriptions
Standard Mandarin
- Hanyu Pinyin: Wú Yùgāng
- IPA: [ǔ ŷ.káŋ]
Yue: Cantonese
- Yale Romanization: Ǹgh Yuhkgōng
- IPA: [ŋ yʊk̚˨.kɔŋ˥]

Christopher Pang (born 29 December 1984) is an Australian actor and producer. He is known for his roles in the films Tomorrow, When the War Began (2010), Crazy Rich Asians (2018), and Send Help (2026).

== Early life and education ==
Pang was born in Melbourne and is the son of Wing Chun instructors. His paternal grandparents are from Canton, China while his father, Barry Pang, was born and raised in Australia. His mother, Anne Pang, was born in Taiwan and migrated to Australia in the 1970s. He was educated at Scotch College.

Pang is distantly related to Bruce Lee as Lee's father was a cousin of Pang's paternal grandmother, and both came from the same village in Canton. Through his mother Anne Pang, Pang is a descendant of Wong Nai Siong, the Chinese revolutionary leader, Christian reformer and humanitarian who was key in the Fujian province in overthrowing the propaganda machine of the late Qing dynasty.

He enrolled in a university and majored in multimedia studies. Unsatisfied with his studies, he later took a year off and sold phones to businesses before going into acting.

Pang is fluent in English, Mandarin and Cantonese. He currently lives in Los Angeles.

== Career ==
While selling phones, Pang began his career incidentally after walking into a casting agency who were looking for a performer to do a Chinese accent for a voice over; Pang booked the role dubbing as Jackie Chan's brother in New Police Story 4. This started his acting career. Shortly afterwards he began studying at TAFTA in Melbourne.

He temporarily moved to Beijing and Hong Kong to pursue an acting career. His big break would come in 2010, booking one of the lead roles in Australian film adaptation of the young adult dystopian novel Tomorrow, When the War Began. Starring opposite Caitlin Stasey, the film was a box office success in Australia. Later he acted in the feature film Citizen Jia Li.

Despite the success of Tomorrow, he received little traction and in 2013 moved to Hollywood to further pursue his acting career. He reunited with his Tomorrow co-star Caitlin Stasey in I, Frankenstein. In 2016, he appeared in the martial arts film Crouching Tiger, Hidden Dragon: Sword of Destiny, in which he played the character Flying Blade. He also recurred in the season two of drama series Marco Polo.

In 2018, he co-starred in the film adaptation Crazy Rich Asians, directed by Jon M. Chu and starring Constance Wu, Michelle Yeoh and Henry Golding. He portrayed Colin Khoo. He later produced and starred in the Manila-set independent film Empty by Design alongside Osric Chau and Filipina actress Rhian Ramos. Empty by Design was his first feature film as a producer.

Pang co-starred in the 2019 reboot and continuation of Charlie's Angels, directed by Elizabeth Banks. In June 2019, he was cast in As We See It, a Jason Katims TV show later cancelled by Amazon Studios after its first season. He also joined the cast of Palm Springs.

Pang features in a documentary by the Australian Government initiative - The National Foundation for Australia-China Relations. Called 'Trailblazers: Breaking barriers and breakout roles' it discusses his experience growing up Asian Australian in the 90's and how it informs his drive to change western audiences perception of Asian actors.

== Filmography ==
=== Film ===
| Year | Title | Role | Notes | Ref. |
|---|---|---|---|---|
| 2010 | Tomorrow, When the War Began | Lee Takkam | | |
| 2011 | Citizen Jia Li | Kong | Also associate producer | |
| 2013 | California Dreaming | Lin Feng | Short | |
| 2014 | I, Frankenstein | Levi | | |
| 2014 | Fist of the Dragon | Sin | | |
| 2014 | The Mule | Phuk | | |
| 2015 | Superfast! | Cool Asian guy | | |
| 2016 | Crouching Tiger, Hidden Dragon: Sword of Destiny | Flying Blade | | |
| 2018 | Crazy Rich Asians | Colin Khoo | | |
| 2019 | Empty by Design | Jun Jie | Also producer | |
| 2019 | Charlie's Angels | Jonny Smith | | |
| 2020 | Palm Springs | Trevor | | |
| 2022 | Blade of the 47 Ronin | Lord Arai | | |
| 2023 | The Portable Door | Casimir | | |
| 2023 | Joy Ride | Kenny | | |
| 2026 | Send Help | Chase | | |

=== Television ===
| Year | Title | Role | Notes | Ref. |
|---|---|---|---|---|
| 2010 | City Homicide | Phuong Lam | Episode: "Pirates" | |
| 2011 | Rush | Than | Episode: "Threats" | |
| 2016 | Marco Polo | Arban | Recurring; 5 episodes (Season 2) | |
| 2022 | As We See It | Van | Main cast | |
| 2024 | Interior Chinatown | Jonathan Wu | 5 episodes | |
| 2026 | The Season | Andrew Fung | 6 episodes | |

== Awards ==
- Asians On Film "Best Actor", 2013
- GQ "Breakout star of the year", 2019
- Hyatt Centric: Chinese Australian Achievers Award "Award - Creative", 2024
- Flathead Lake International Cinemafest: Neither Donkey nor Horse "Best Actor" Festival and Audience Award, 2025
