= Barry Pang =

Australian kung fu practitioner

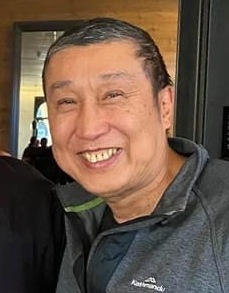
- Pang in 2020
- Born: 11 August 1951 (age 75); Melbourne, Victoria, Australia
- Occupation: Martial artist
- Spouse: Anne Pang
- Children: 2, including Chris Pang

Chinese name
- Traditional Chinese: 吳國樹
- Simplified Chinese: 吴国树
Transcriptions
Standard Mandarin
- Hanyu Pinyin: Wúguó Shù
- IPA: [ǔ.kwǒ ʂû]
Yue: Cantonese
- Jyutping: Ng4-Gwok3 Syu6
- IPA: [ŋ.kʷɔk̚˧ sy˨]

Barry Pang, (Chinese: 吳國樹, born 11 August 1951) is a martial arts instructor who was involved in the development and growth of kung fu in Australia. He is a noted Chinese Australian and Melbourne Australian Chinese entrepreneur who promotes bridging cultural differences through sport. The Barry Pang school has been in operation since 1974 and was one of the earliest kung fu schools in Melbourne. Pang is involved in the Australian horse racing industry and was the first Chinese Australian owner of a Melbourne Cup Winner, Fiorente. His son is actor Chris Pang.

== Early life ==
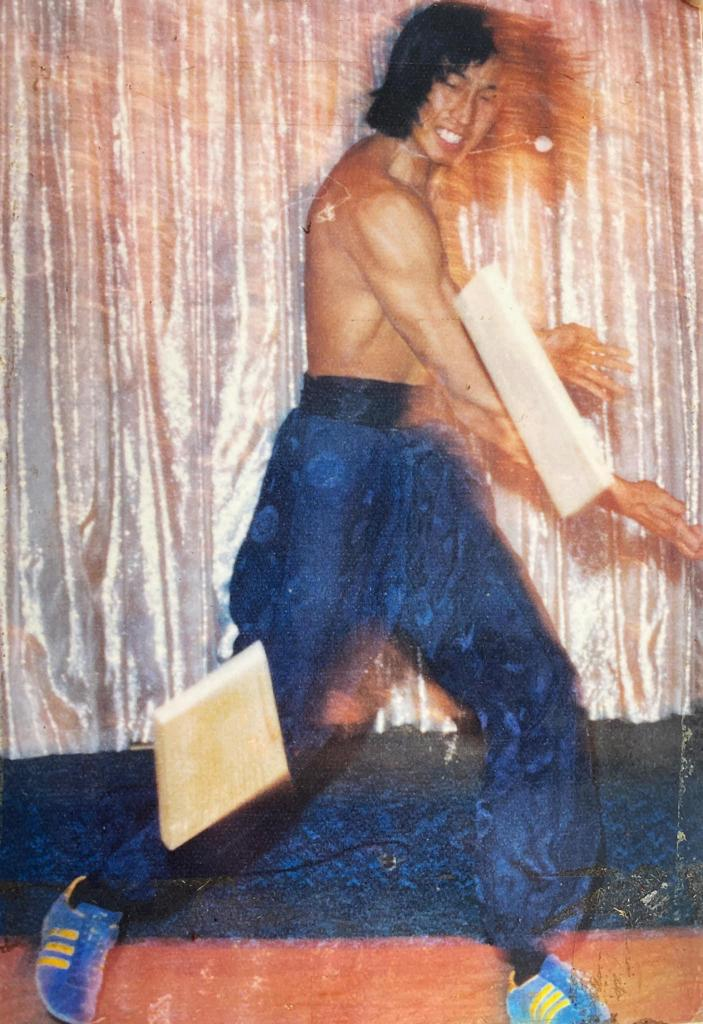
Barry Pang breaking board in mid air 1974

Pang was born in Melbourne to immigrant parents from Canton. He was raised in the Melbourne suburb of St Kilda, where he attended St Kilda Park Primary and Elwood High School. Pang studied mechanical engineering at Monash University.

He began studying Tae Kwon Do at high school and continued practising until leaving university. Pursuing his martial arts interest in 1973 he travelled to Hong Kong to study Wing Chun kung fu under Wong Shun Leung. Upon returning to Melbourne he opened a Wing Chun school in Australia alongside William Cheung.

Pang is related to fellow kung fu legend Bruce Lee as Pang's mother was cousins with Lee's father.

== Martial arts career ==
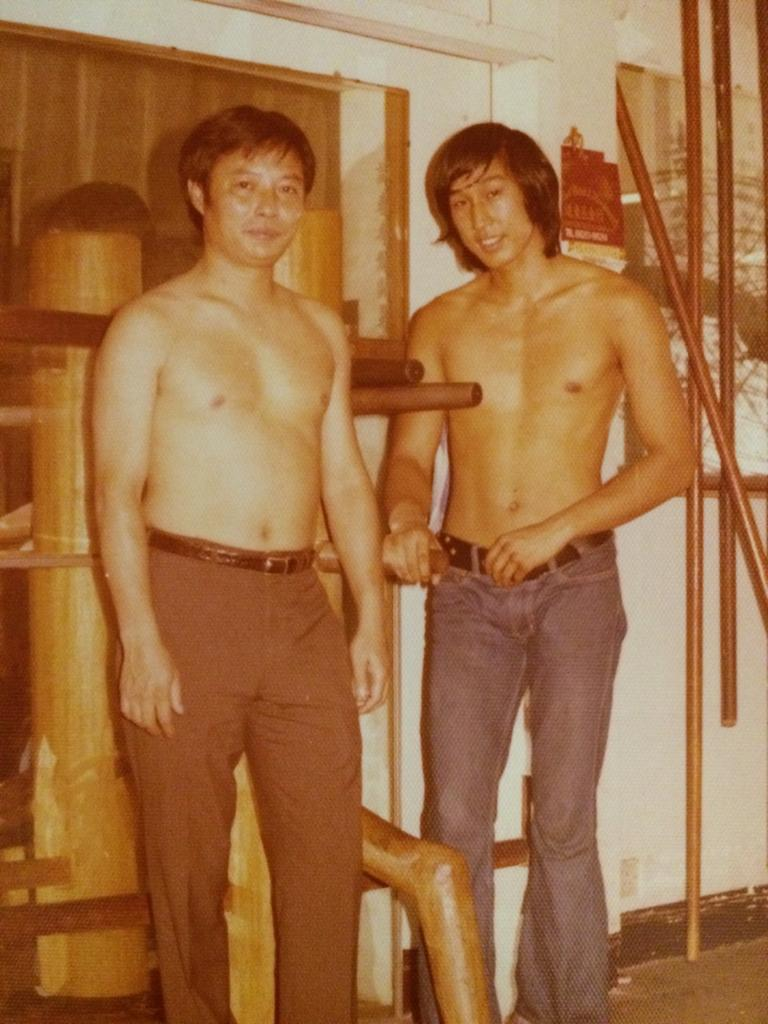
Training in Hong Kong with Wong Shun Leung 1973

Pang's early martial arts training began in high school with Tae Kwon Do under Jack Rozinsky and then at university where he trained with Yong Dai Cho. In early adulthood Pang began training Chinese kung fu with the martial artists who practiced in Melbourne who had trained in Hong Kong. In 1973 Pang travelled to Hong Kong to train with Wong Shun Leung. Whilst in Hong Kong he also studied Choy Li Fut with Hom Keung.

In the early 1990s Pang met Wu Hua Tai, a Southern Dragon Kung Fu (Lung Ying) practitioner who was a senior student of Grandmaster Lam Yiu Gwai. He had a background in other kung fu styles prior to learning Lung Ying, and had studied other soft styles of Kung Fu such as Tai Chi. Barry Pang and his wife Anne Pang began practising Lung Ying, Liuhebafa, and Tai Chi in addition to Wing Chun. They trained under Wu Hua Tai until his death in 2002.

In early 1976 Pang participated in the formation of the Australian National Kung Fu Federation (ANKFF), as vice president along with William Cheung as the president. However, by the end of 1976 A feud between Barry Pang and William Cheung erupted publicly. The conflict was over membership in the Kung Fu Federation of Australia and the rights to run kung fu schools in Melbourne. Cheung, the then chairman of the ANKFF, expelled Pang from the organisation and confronted Pang in person and in a series of newspaper articles. Described by the 'Sunday Observer' as a "Kung-Fu War" Cheung challenged him to a 'duel in unarmed combat' to which Pang replied 'It all sounds like a cheap Hong Kong movie'. The ongoing conflict continued for a month with further demands and challenges from Cheung. Eventually the matter was settled without a fight. Barry was allowed back in the KFA later in the year. The two schools continued to operate in Melbourne and their respective students continued to compete against one another in the full contact tournaments that ran into the 1980s.

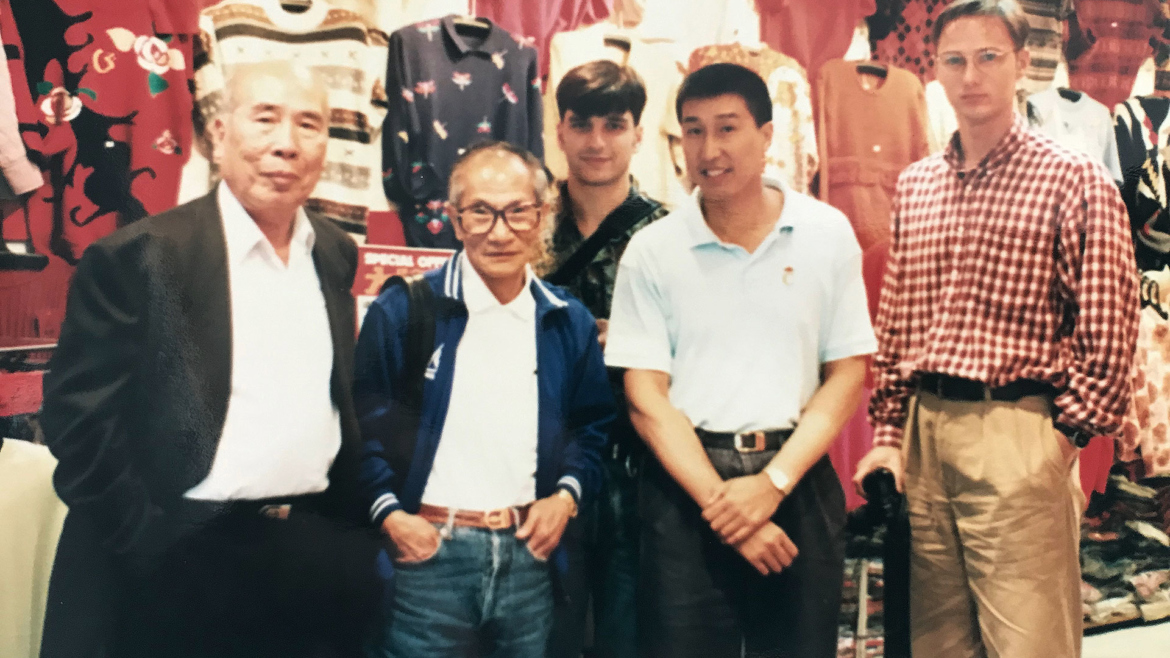
Wu Hua Tai, Yip Chun and Barry Pang in 1994

The organisation ran the Australasian Kung Fu Championships from circa 1977/1978, with the 1981 championships being filmed and shown on SBS Television. Pang's students won the light and flyweight division at this event. These were the earliest Australian full contact tournaments open to all styles of martial arts. Barry Pang was the Championship Director and a referee at these tournaments. Pang was also the first official referee for the Australasian Professional Karate tournaments, which were the forerunner of the open style full contact kickboxing tournaments in the late seventies and eighties. He was noted figure in early Australian Martial arts, having associations with key instructors in Kung Fu, Tae Kwon Do, Kickboxing and Karate. Tino Ceberano, the father of Australian Karate writes 'My good friend, Sifu Barry Pang, a kung fu master, shared some dojo space with us in the city dojo...It's notable because i dont think you'd find many instances of Karate and Kung Fu sharing training space or having much to do with each other in that era. We got on well and were always sharing knowledge and skills.'

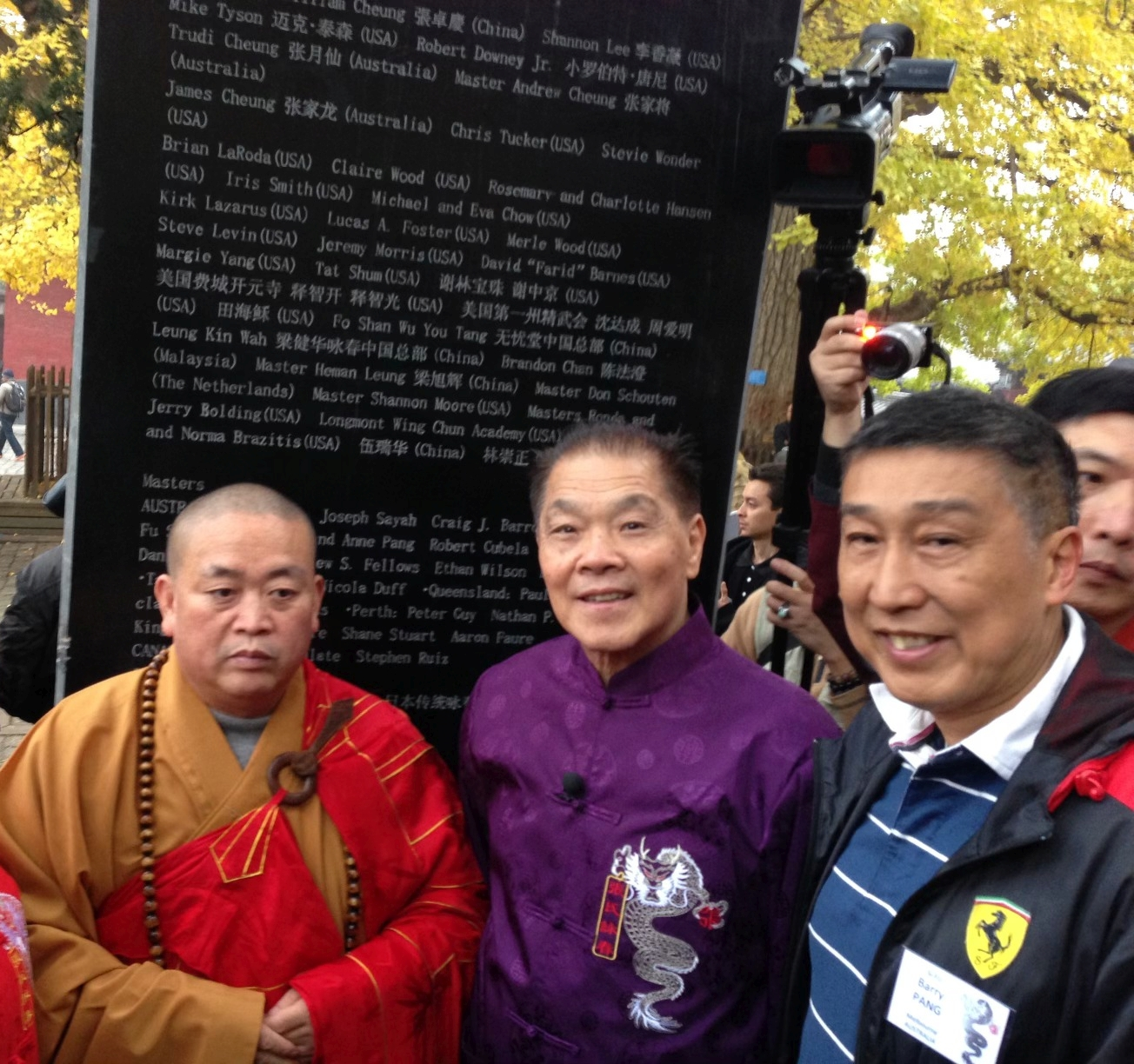
Barry Pang, William Cheung and Abbot Shi Yongxin at the return of Wing Chun to Shaolin ceremony

The Barry Pang Kung Fu Schools expanded rapidly in the 70s in the Melbourne CBD and decentralised into the suburbs in the 80s. Students of the school successfully participated in the open tournaments of the period. Barry Pang Schools were also established within Victorian universities. RMIT in 1975 and Melbourne University in 1976. The university clubs expanded into the other Victorian universities in the 90s and branches were opened at LaTrobe, Monash Caulfield, Monash Clayton, and Swinburne. In 1998 he established the Southern Universities Sports Association Kung Fu championships, which opened martial arts competitions to Victorian universities. The organised tournaments were opened to all styles of martial arts and ran from 1998 to mid-2000s. In 2001 the actor Chris Pang won his weight division in the tournament. In 2002 Pang's student Alastair Boast helped thwart the Monash University shooting and received a gold medal from Royal Humane Society of Australasia. In 1996 Pang was awarded the Blitz Hall of Fame Kung Fu Tribute Award.

Pang has been featured in and contributed to various martial arts magazines. He has written articles such as the 'History and techniques of Wing Chun'. In 2022 he and his wife Anne Pang assisted Melbourne University Associate Professor Andrew Godwin on a Law article in the bilingual Asia Business Law Journal 'China Lexicon'. This compares the wing chun approach to combat and the code of conduct devised by Ip Man to legal approaches to practice and codes of conduct.

Barry has been working with Anne Pang in the development of women's self defence programs.

== Horse racing career ==
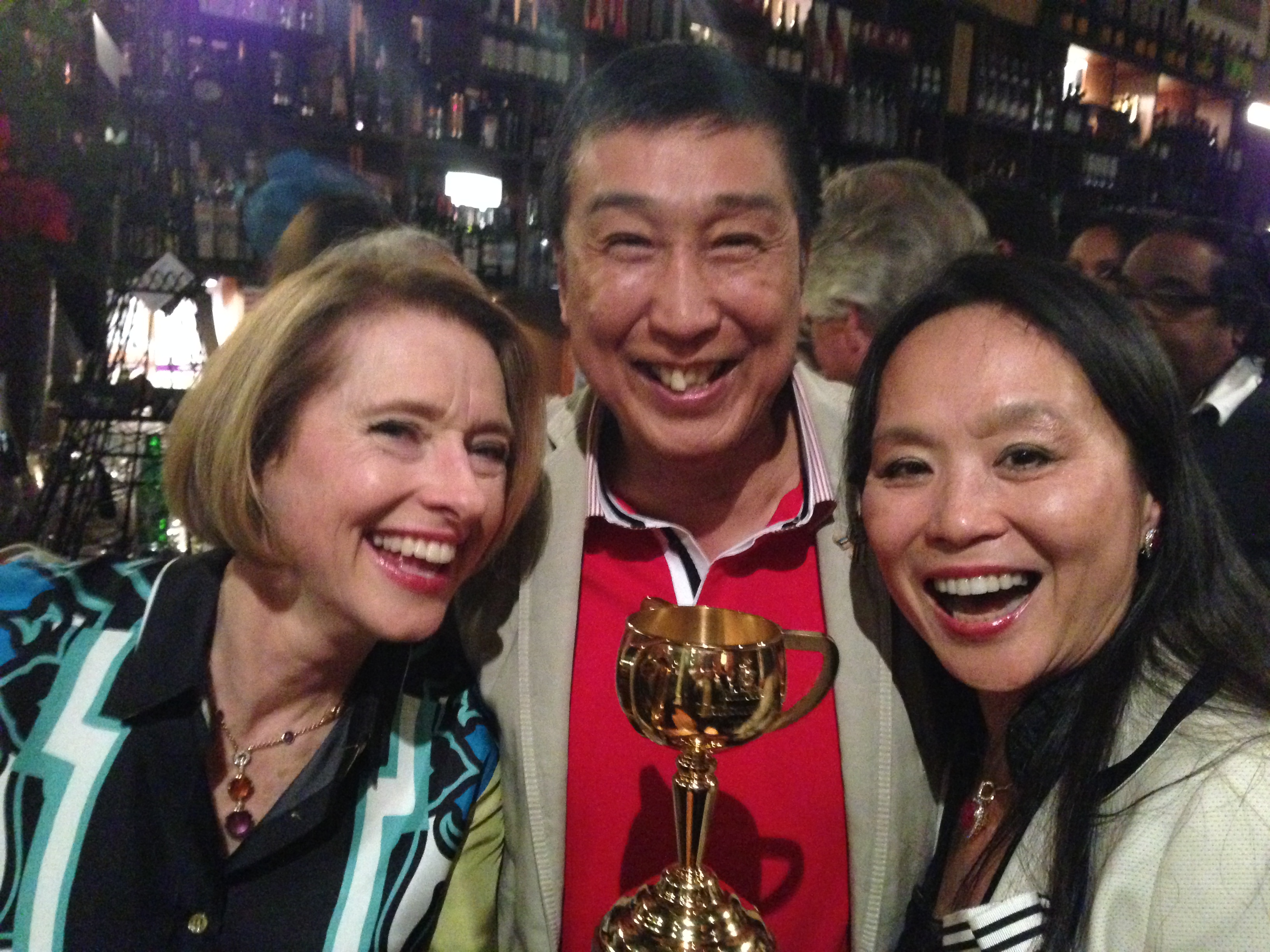
Barry and Anne Pang with Fiorente trainer, Gai Waterhouse

Pang is involved in Australian horse racing and is recognised as one of the more prominent horse owner in contemporary Australian horse racing. Pang is an owner of horses who have won group 1 races. Marwong won the Caulfield Guineas in 1987. Pang was a part owner of the Melbourne Cup 2013 winner horse Fiorente under trainer Gai Waterhouse. In 2019 Cape Of Good Hope won the Caulfield Stakes with trainer David Hayes. Barry Pang co-owns the horse 'Delphi' that won the 2021 Herbert Power Stakes at Caulfield, along with his wife Anne Pang and son Chris Pang. Barry proposed that the Melbourne Cup spring carnival introduce a pre-cup horse auctions akin to the London Royal Ascot auctions as a means to increase the spring carnival's publicity. In October of 2024, Barry along with Australian Jockey Michelle Payne and horse trainer Ben Hayes presented the Kooyong Stadium Presidents Lunch panel on horse racing. Horse ownership in 2024 includes 'Buffalo River' from the Mike Moroney yard at Flemington.

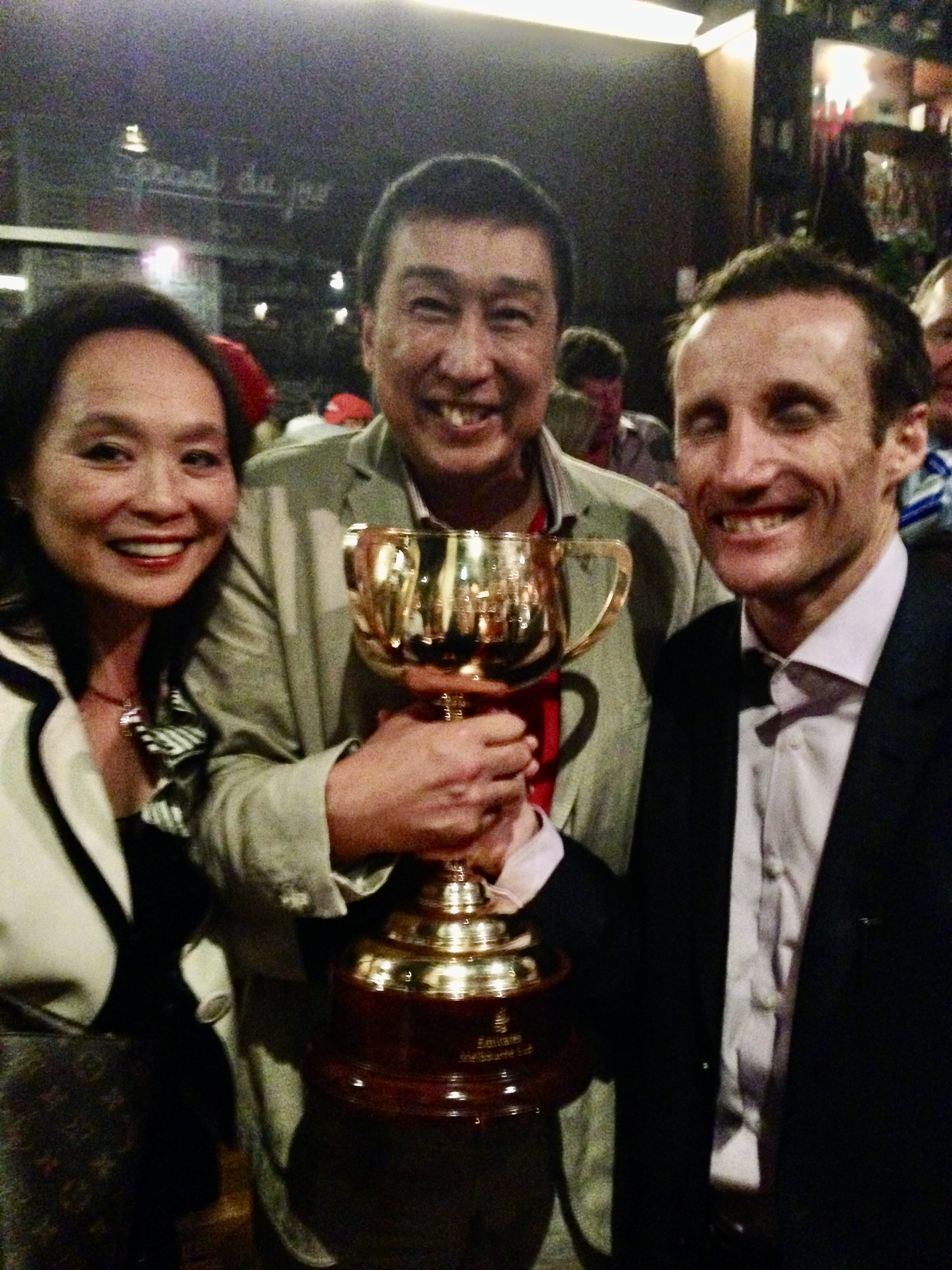
Barry and Anne Pang with Damien Oliver and the Melbourne Cup after Fiorente's victory in 2013

== Business career ==
In the late 90s, Pang and wife Anne began an art consultancy firm dealing in Australian fine art called Artpreciation. It dealt primarily with Australian paintings and focused on growing a burgeoning Australian art market. Upon retirement from the art market, The Barry & Anne Pang Collection was auctioned off in 2015.

From 2016 Barry has been a director at Lateral Pharma an Australian biotechnology company undergoing clinical trials into the application of AOD-9604 (Lipotropin) for medical pain treatment. AOD-9604 was a compound used in the Essendon Football Club supplements saga.

In 2018 Pang was a director at Lanka Graphite, an Australian-based graphite exploration company.

Pang is a noted Australian businessman working towards improving Chinese - Australian relations and positive integration for Chinese Australian immigrants. He advocates for migrants to get involved in local pastimes such as Australian football or Horse-racing as way to positively participate in Australian society and improve integration.

In 2025, the Australian government’s National Foundation for Australia–China Relations produced a short feature on the Pang family, interviewing Barry, Anne, Chris and John Pang. The video highlights the family’s role in reshaping Australian perceptions of the Chinese community and draws parallels with William Arquette, the first Chinese Australian barrister.

== Awards ==
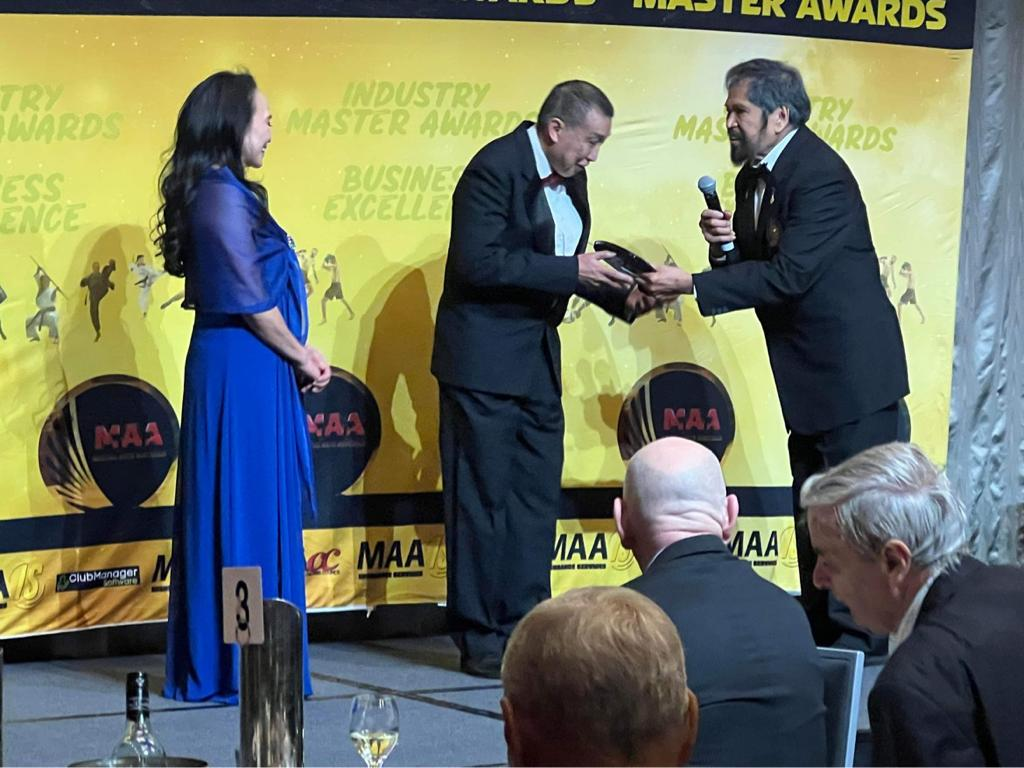
Barry receiving lifetime achievement award at Martial Arts Australia 2023 awards night from Tino Ceberano

1996 Blitz Magazine Hall of Fame Kung Fu Tribute Award.

2023 Martial Arts Australia, Masters Award for Lifetime achievement. Received alongside Richard Norton, Benny Urquidez, and Mike Stone.
