= Anthony Arnett =

American Grandmaster of Wing Chun Kung Fu

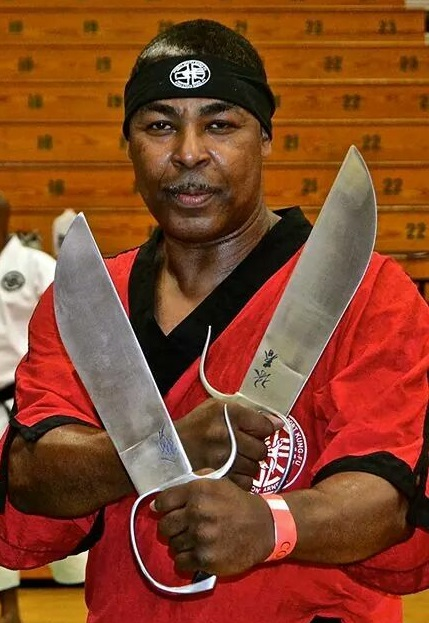
- Nationality: American
- Style: Traditional Wing Chun Kung Fu; Arnett Sport Kung Fu
- Teacher: William Cheung
- Rank: Grandmaster

Other information
- Spouse: Sharell Jackson Arnett
- Notable students: Corvey Irvin; Paul Spicer
- Website: www.sportkungfu.com

Arnett Sport Kung Fu
- Also known as: Cheung Style
- Focus: Hybrid
- Country of origin: United States
- Creator: Anthony Arnett
- Famous practitioners: Corvey Irvin; Paul Spicer
- Parenthood: Kenpo Karate; Boxing; Shotokan Karate; White Crane Kung Fu; Jeet Kune Do; Wing Chun

Anthony Arnett is an American martial artist specializing in Chinese martial arts, particularly Wing Chun. He is a direct disciple of Australian Wing Chun pioneer William Cheung and is founder of his own system, Arnett Sport Kung Fu.

Arnett is a martial artist and has been inducted into Universal Martial Arts Hall of Fame.

== Background ==
=== Early life ===
Though Arnett had learnt martial arts from his uncle, he was reluctant to display his skills, as he felt that Asian martial arts were seen "kicking and flailing" and considered to be effeminate behavior that could attract ridicule and other kind of unwanted attention from the local youth gangs.

Arnett kept his martial arts skills hidden until 1975, when he saw the movie Five Fingers of Death. With the kung fu craze of the period, Arnett realized the popularity of Chinese martial arts and stopped hiding his martial arts knowledge.

Arnett began competing in Point Tournaments in 1974 then in 1977 he became a division champion in local tournaments.

=== In 1980s and 1990s ===
He opened his first Wing Chun School in Maryland, co-opened a second school in 1983 then in 1986 he opened the first Traditional Wing Chun School in Georgia and opened the second Wing Chun School in Augusta, Georgia, in 1987 before finally settling to teach in Jacksonville, Florida.

In 1984 he became an East Coast Grand Champion then became Grand Champion in Fighting and Forms while competing in Georgia in 1989.

In 1993 he was Grand Champion in Continuous Sparring for 3 consecutive years. Arnett retained the Division Championship title for 6 consecutive years and retained the Division Championship title in the Tri State Circuit.

In 1996 he completed a three volume video series on Arnett Sport Kung Fu starring Grandmaster William Cheung and himself. In 1998 he opened his first private lessons studio exclusively for one on one sessions in Jacksonville, Florida. Arnett started promoting tournament training camps and seminars in 1999.

=== 2000 to present ===
In 2000 Arnett won numerous championships including the Overall Championship in the National Arts League for Forms Demonstration, Weapons Demonstration and Most Student Competitors. Arnett was awarded NKKU Ultimate Grand Champion for 2001 in Forms, Weapons, and Fighting in the Masters Division and also Grand Champion in the North Florida Martial Arts Association.

In 2002 Arnett opened a 3rd school in Orange Park, Florida and would being distributing of training guides for Traditional Wing Chun Kung Fu and Arnett Sport Kung Fu in DVD and CD-ROM formats.

In 2005 Arnett became the official martial arts instructor for NFL Football Team Jacksonville Jaguars, their strength and conditioning coach Mark Asanovich praised and thanked Arnett for his work with the team he wrote in a letter; the training was much liked by the players, well designed and well run and that he would continue to support Arnett Sport Kung Fu in future relationships.

In 2012 Arnett was personally invited by William Cheung to be guest instructor at the Cheung's Wing Chun Kung Fu Academy in Melbourne, Australia Headquarters of the Global Traditional Wing Chun Kung Fu Association.

== Accomplishments ==
=== Awards and honors ===
- Arnett appeared on Inside Kung Fu Magazine May 2006 front cover with Jackie Chan Featured in the Magazine article "Cheung Style for Tournaments".
- 2004 Universal Hall of Fame inductee for Kung-Fu Artist of the Year.

=== Grand Champion highlights ===
Year	Title	Description
1982	Grand Champion	East Coast Tournament Circuit and ranked 8th in the nation on three tournament circuits.
1984	First Place	Heavy Weight Champion in "Ziggs Hard Contact Tournament".
1989	Grand Champion	In Fighting and Forms category at Georgia.
1991	Grand Champion	In Continuous Fighting Format Tournaments in Florida.
1992	Grand Champion	Undefeated in continuous Fighting Format Grand Champion title and Division Champion in Point Tournament.
1992	Grand Champion	At North Florida Open Martial Arts C.S.F. in continuous Fighting, Forms, and Weapons.
1993	Grand Champion	Undefeated as Grand Champion in continuous Fighting and Division Champion in Point Tournament.
1994	Grand champion	In Men's Fighting Heavy Weight at "Night Of Legends" All Star Fighters.
2000	Overall Grand Champion	In the "National Martial Arts League" for Forms and Weapons Demonstration, also Awarded the "Most Competitors" Award.
2001	Ultimate Grand Champion	At the "National Karate & Kung-Fu Union" (N.K.K.U.) in Forms, Weapons, and Fighting in the Masters Division.
2001	Grand Champion	In the "North Florida Martial Arts Association".
2001	Grand Champion	At the "Southern Sport Karate Open".
2001	3rd Place	In Fencing Competition at Gainesville, Florida.
2001	1st Place	In Inner School Fencing Tournament.
2004	Grand Champion	At the Gallops Karate Tournament in Fighting Masters Division.
2004	Grand Champion	”Gainesville Challenge” (Gainesville, Florida for Fighting Masters Division.
2005	Grand Champion	"Bethel Champion of Champions" for Fighting.
2007	Grand Champion	"Gallops Karate Tournament" for Fighting.
2008	Grand Champion & Gold Medal	"National Karate & Kung-Fu Union" (N.K.K.U.) for fighting and Gold medal winner in Masters Division.
2008	Grand Champion	”Gallops Karate Tournament" for fighting.
2008	Grand Champion	"Bethel Champion of Champions" for Fighting.
2009	Grand Champion and Gold Medal	"National Karate & Kung-Fu Union" (N.K.K.U.) for fighting and Gold medal winner in Masters Division.
2010	Grand Champion and Gold Medal	"National Karate & Kung-Fu Union" (N.K.K.U.) for fighting and Gold medal winner in Masters Division.
2017	Grandmaster Grand Champion	"National Karate & Kung-Fu Union" (N.K.K.U.) for sparring Grandmaster Blackbelt.

== Instructor lineage ==
Age	Style	Instructor
5 years old	Kenpo Karate	Sensi Richard Brooks (Uncle)
11 years old	Boxing	Coach Greg Louis
13 years old	Shotokan Karate & White Crane Kung Fu	Master James Little
	Judo	Master Mark Amous
17 years old	Jeet Kune Do	Sifu Nathaniel Singletary
19 years old	Gung-Fu/Wing Chun	Sifu Nick Edwards
23 years old	Traditional Wing Chun	Grandmaster William Cheung
33 years old	Kali(Arnis)	Grandmaster Joe DeGuzman
43 years old	Combat & Sport Fencing	Coach Raul Toro

== Images ==
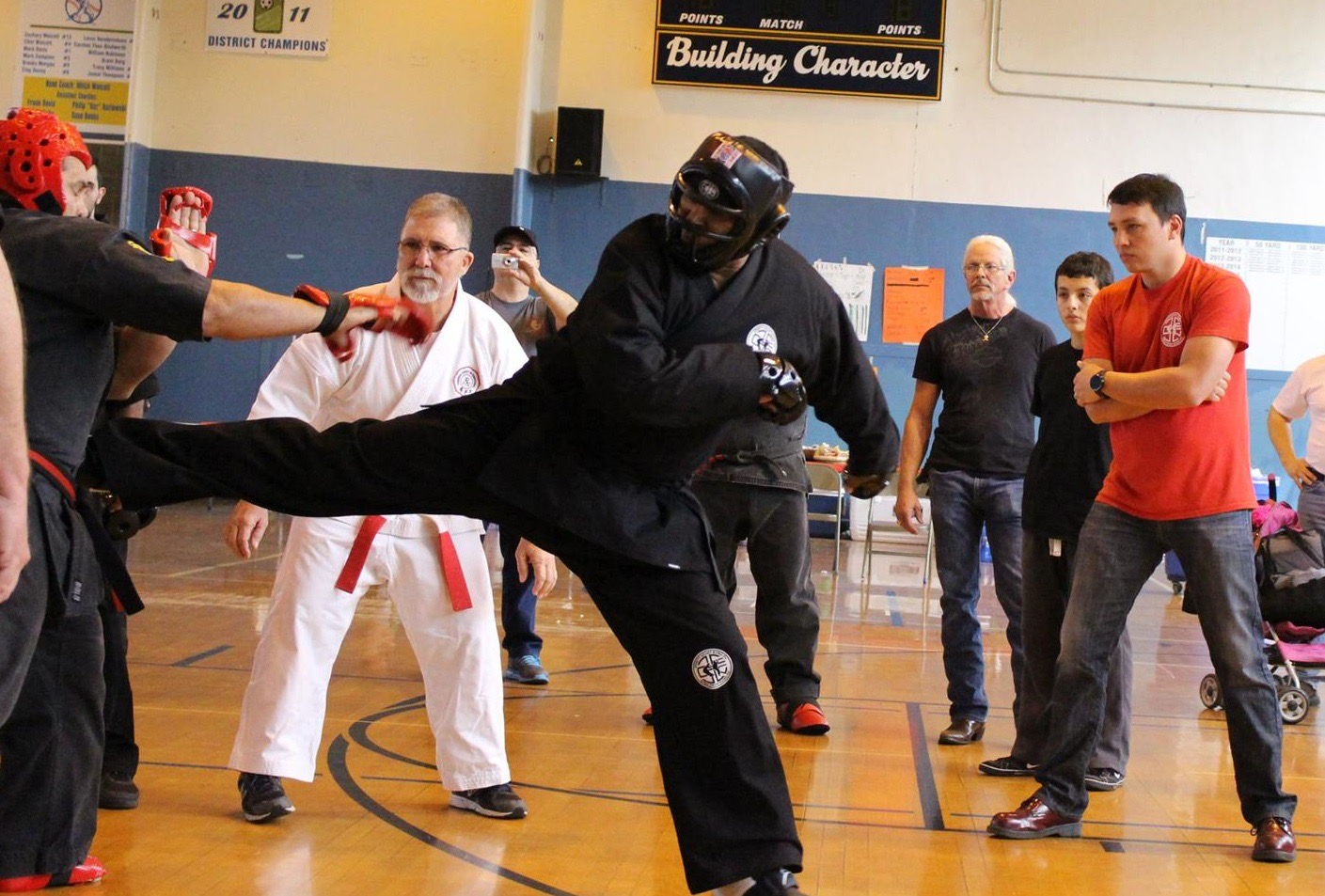
Arnett kicking his opponent in a tournament

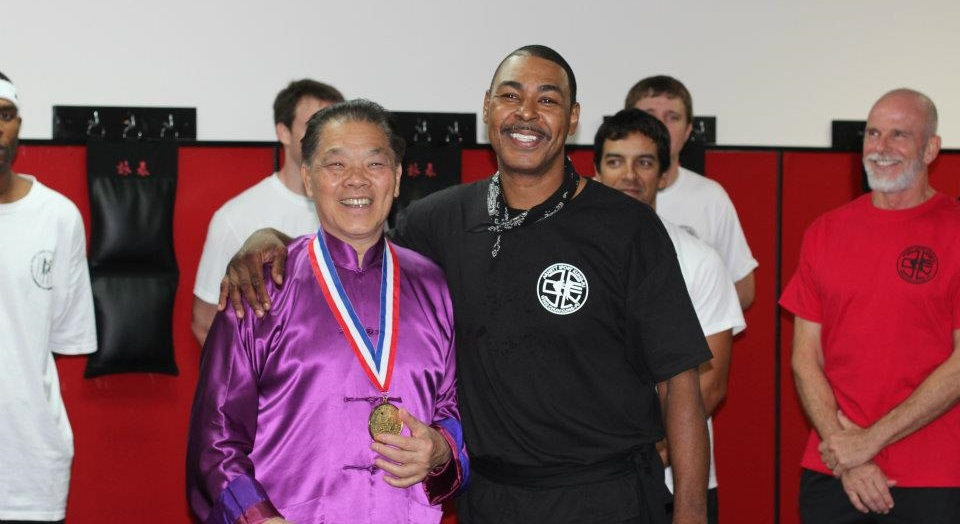
Anthony Arnett gives William Cheung one of his gold medals in Jacksonville
