= Corvey Irvin =

American football player (born 1985)

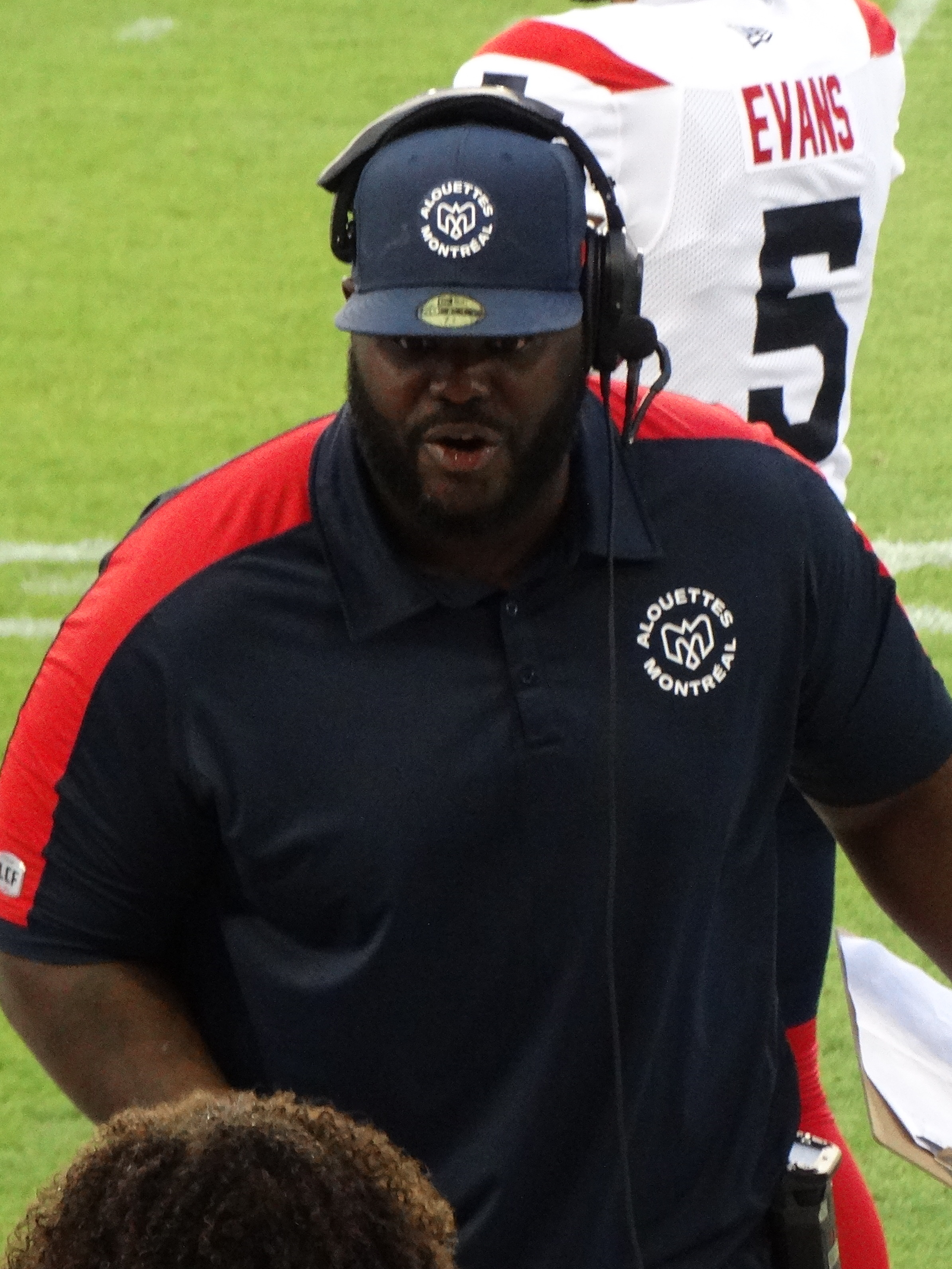
- Irvin with the Montreal Alouettes in 2024

Montreal Alouettes
- Title: Defensive line coach

Personal information
- Born: May 3, 1985 (age 41); Augusta, Georgia, U.S.
- Listed height: 6 ft 2 in (1.88 m)
- Listed weight: 295 lb (134 kg)

Career information
- High school: Laney (Augusta)
- College: Georgia
- NFL draft: 2009: 3rd round, 93rd overall pick

Career history

Playing
- Carolina Panthers (2009–2010); Detroit Lions (2011)*; Jacksonville Jaguars (2011); Tampa Bay Buccaneers (2012); Chicago Bears (2013)*; Dallas Cowboys (2013); Detroit Lions (2014)*; Calgary Stampeders (2014)*; Montreal Alouettes (2014–2015); Saskatchewan Roughriders (2016); Winnipeg Blue Bombers (2017)*
- * Offseason or practice squad member only

Coaching
- Concordia (2019–2022) Defensive line coach; Montreal Alouettes (2023–present) Defensive line coach

Awards and highlights
- Grey Cup champion (2023)

Career NFL statistics
- Total tackles: 14
- Stats at Pro Football Reference
- Stats at CFL.ca (archive)

Corvey Irvin (born May 3, 1985) is an American former professional football player who was a defensive tackle in the National Football League (NFL) and Canadian Football League (CFL). He is currently the defensive line coach for the Montreal Alouettes of the CFL.

Irvin was selected by the Carolina Panthers in the third round of the 2009 NFL draft. He was also a member of the Detroit Lions , Jacksonville Jaguars, Tampa Bay Buccaneers, Chicago Bears, Dallas Cowboys, Detroit Lions, Calgary Stampeders, Montreal Alouettes, Saskatchewan Roughriders, and Winnipeg Blue Bombers. He played college football for the Georgia Bulldogs.

== Professional career ==
Pre-draft measurables
Height	Weight	Arm length	Hand span	40-yard dash	10-yard split	20-yard split	20-yard shuttle	Three-cone drill	Vertical jump	Broad jump	Bench press
6 ft 3 in (1.91 m)	301 lb (137 kg)	33 3/4 in (0.86 m)	9 3/8 in (0.24 m)	4.99 s	1.71 s	2.79 s	4.66 s	7.44 s	25.0 in (0.64 m)	8 ft 7 in (2.62 m)	24 reps
All values from NFL Combine/Pro Day

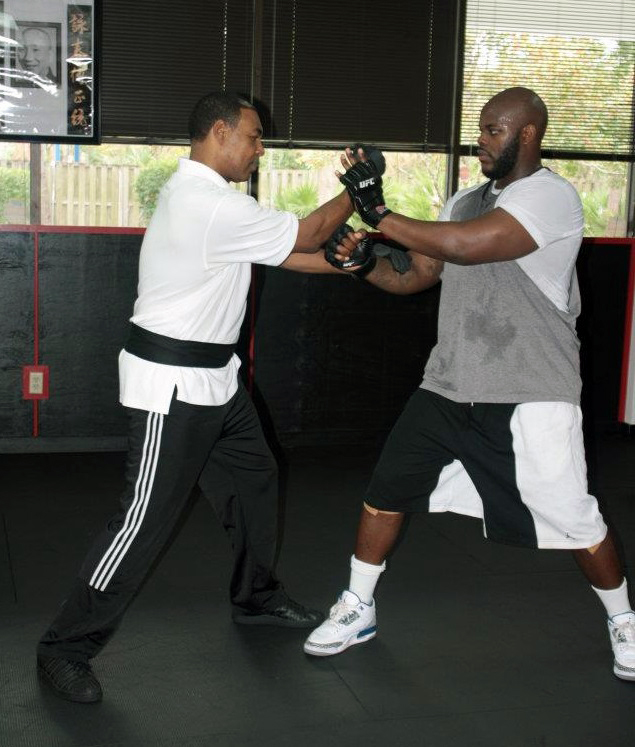
Corvey Irvin Training Wing Chun Kung Fu under Master Anthony Arnett in Jacksonville FL 2012

=== Carolina Panthers ===
Irvin was selected by the Carolina Panthers in the third round of the 2009 NFL draft. He officially signed with the team on July 27, 2009. He was placed on injured reserve on September 5, 2009.

Irvin was waived on September 4, 2010 and signed to the team's practice squad on September 6. He was promoted to the active roster on December 14, 2010 and played in two games for the Panthers during the 2010 season, recording three solo tackles and three assisted tackles. He was waived on September 3, 2011.

=== Detroit Lions (first stint) ===
Irvin was signed to the Detroit Lions' practice squad on September 6, 2011. He was released on October 12, 2011.

=== Jacksonville Jaguars ===
Irvin was signed to the practice squad of the Jacksonville Jaguars on October 19, 2011. He was promoted to the active roster on December 2, 2011 and played in four games for the Jaguars during the 2011 season, totaling one solo tackle. He was waived on August 31, 2012.

=== Tampa Bay Buccaneers ===
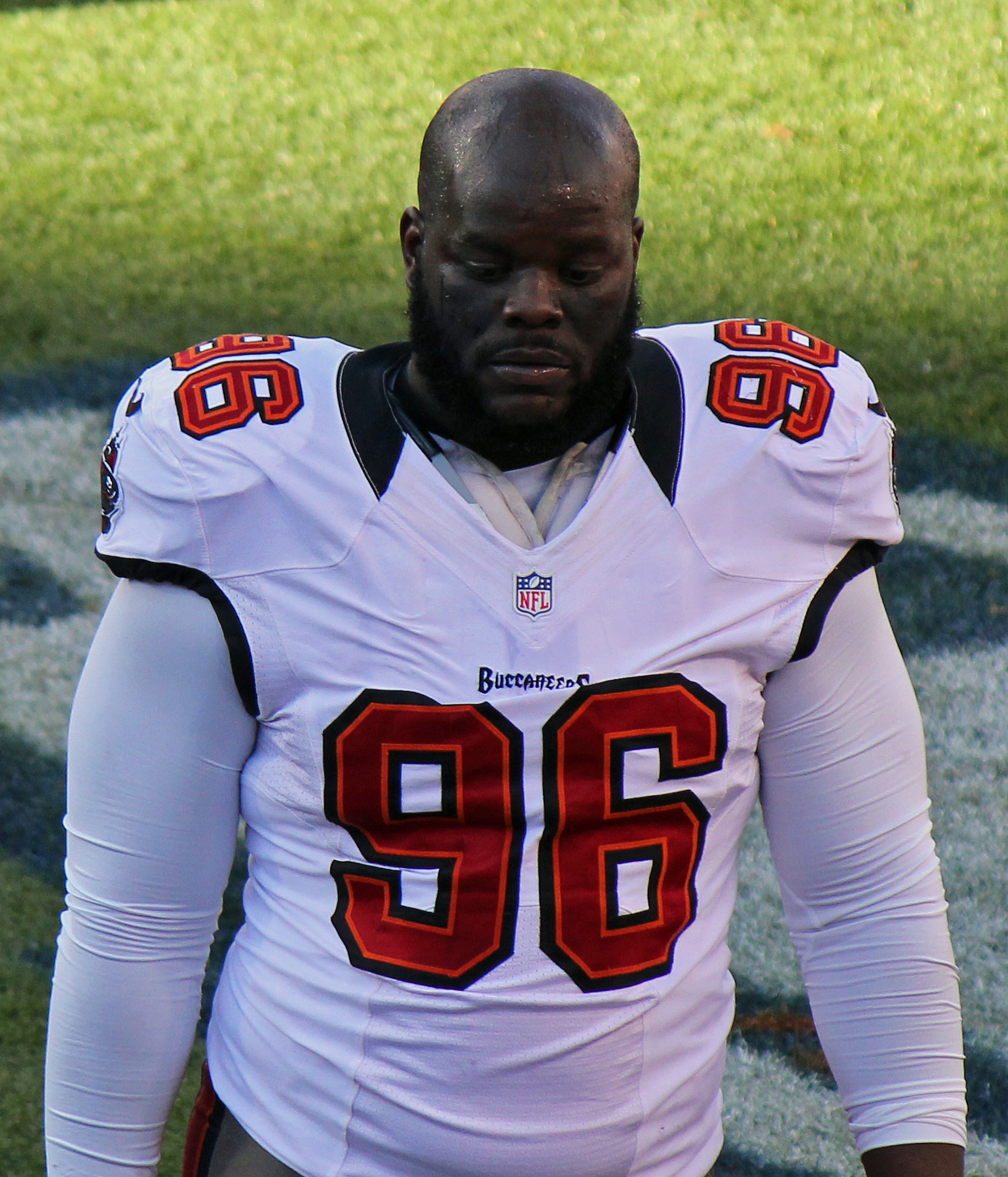
Irvin with the Buccaneers in 2012

Irvin was claimed off waivers by the Tampa Bay Buccaneers on September 1, 2012. He appeared in 12 games for the Buccaneers in 2012, recording three solo tackles and three assisted tackles. He was released on May 2, 2013.

=== Chicago Bears ===
He worked out at Chicago Bears minicamp in 2013, and was signed on May 13. On August 31, 2013, Irvin was released.

=== Dallas Cowboys ===
On November 12, 2013, Irvin signed a contract with the Dallas Cowboys He played in six games for the Cowboys in 2013, totaling two solo tackles and one assisted tackle. He was released on February 28, 2014.

=== Detroit Lions (second stint) ===
On March 4, 2014, Irvin signed with the Lions. He was released on May 19, 2014.

=== Calgary Stampeders ===
Irvin was signed to the practice roster of the Calgary Stampeders of the Canadian Football League (CFL) on August 20, 2014. He was released by the Stampeders on September 10, 2014.

=== Montreal Alouettes ===
Irvin was signed to the practice roster of the Montreal Alouettes of the CFL on October 10, 2014. He was promoted to the active roster on November 7, 2014. In 2015, Irvin played in 13 games and racked up 11 tackles and 3 sacks.

=== Saskatchewan Roughriders ===
Irvin was signed by the CFL's Saskatchewan Roughriders on February 12, 2016. Irvin played in all 18 regular season games for the Roughriders, contributing 27 tackles and 5 sacks. Following the 2016 season he was not re-signed by the Roughriders and became a free agent on February 14, 2017.

=== Winnipeg Blue Bombers ===
On March 13, 2017, Irvin signed with the Winnipeg Blue Bombers of the CFL. He retired before the start of the 2017 season on April 21, 2017.

== Coaching career ==
=== Concordia ===
Irvin joined the coaching staff of Concordia in U Sports football in 2019.

=== Montreal Alouettes ===
Irvin joined the staff of the Montreal Alouettes as their defensive line coach for the 2023 CFL season.
