= Chloe and Theo =

Chloe & Theo
- Theatrical release poster
- Directed by: Ezna Sands
- Written by: Ezna Sands
- Produced by: Monica Ord
- Starring: Dakota Johnson; Mira Sorvino; Theo Ikummaq
- Cinematography: Luke Geissbuhler; Aaron Krummel; Peter Zeitlinger
- Edited by: Victor Jory; Jonno Woodford-Robinson
- Music by: The Newton Brothers
- Production company: Arctica Films
- Distributed by: Spotlight Pictures; Tiberius Film; ARC Entertainment
- Release date: April 15, 2015
- Running time: 81 minutes
- Country: United States
- Language: English
- Box office: $490 (Portugal)

Chloe and Theo is a 2015 American independent drama film written and directed by Ezna Sands, and starring Dakota Johnson, Mira Sorvino, and Theo Ikummaq.

The film was released in the United States on September 4, 2015, in a limited release, and through video on demand. It received negative reviews and has 6% approval rating on Rotten Tomatoes. This was the last film with Larry King as an actor before his death in January 2021.

== Synopsis ==
A young homeless woman from New York City named Chloe strikes up a friendship with an Arctic Inuk man named Theo who is looking for the Elders of the Southern world to save his people. Chloe joins him in his quest which takes viewers on a journey of heart and humor.

== Cast ==
- Dakota Johnson as Chloe
- Theo Ikummaq as Theo
- Mira Sorvino as Monica
- Andre DeShields as Mr. Sweet
- Ashley Springer as Tyler
- Larry King as himself
- Eric Oram as Sancho
- Haas Manning as Shai
- Lori Tan Chinn as Landlady
- Lawrence Ballard as Male Interrogator
- Elizabeth Masucci as Female Interrogator
- Christopher Backus as Juju Joe
- Quincy Chad as a Punk
- Dion Sapp as a Punk

== Production ==
According to Luke Geissbuhler, the American cinematographer, the production was under continuous pressure due to an inexperienced producer. Many of the locations that were scheduled to be used were either poorly managed or altogether cancelled, sometimes on the very day they were due to be shot.

One significant example of this concerned the United Nations building in Manhattan. The U.N. building had agreed to allow filming inside due to long awaited refurbishment about to commence, however, when the unit arrived on the day to begin filming, the director and crew were informed that the producer had failed to follow up and secure/confirm the date for the booking, leaving a sizeable hole in the middle of production. Because of this and other similar instances, the production faced constant changes throughout filming, the result of which meant that only two-thirds of the whole script were actually committed to film.

The difficult and haphazard nature of the production resulted in Ezna Sands leaving the project before they had completed pickups or entered full post-production. The producer then proceeded in recutting, posting and mixing the film to their own satisfaction, leaving Ezna Sands' version of an already incomplete film on the cutting room floor.

Ezna Sands did not attend any screenings and, according to a podcast in 2023, had yet to see the finished film.

== Release ==
On October 29, 2014, it was announced Spotlight Pictures had acquired worldwide sales to the film. On May 12, 2015, it was announced Tiberus Film would release the film in Germany. The film was scheduled to be released in Germany on October 1, 2015. The film was released in the United Kingdom on June 26, 2015 through video on demand, and in the United States on September 4, 2015 in a limited release and through video on demand.

== Critical reception ==
On Rotten Tomatoes the film has an approval rating of 6% based on 17 reviews. On Metacritic, the film has a score of 24 out of 100 based on nine critics, indicating "generally unfavorable" reviews.

Frank Scheck of The Hollywood Reporter gave the film a negative review, writing, "Ikummaq displays a quiet dignity in his understated performance, even as his character is often reduced to being the butt of silly jokes. But Johnson squanders whatever good will she earned from 50 Shades of Grey, looking apple-pie wholesome as a homeless ex-junkie whose squalid state is suggested only by artful smudges on her cheeks." Garry Garrison of Indiewire also gave the film a D, writing, "The hope left then, is that the intentions were pure. Surely, at some point 'Chloe And Theo' had substance and depth and made a bit more narrative sense (the thing appears to have been hacked from 112 minutes down to a brief 81 minute runtime complete with two voiceovers), but the result here is painful. 'Chloe And Theo' should have been a film about Theo: a complex man taking on an unfamiliar world he is not particularly fond of, with little more than conviction and principle to help him along. Instead, we get another film where a hapless foreigner teaches white people how to better themselves."
