= Eric Oram =

American martial artist and actor

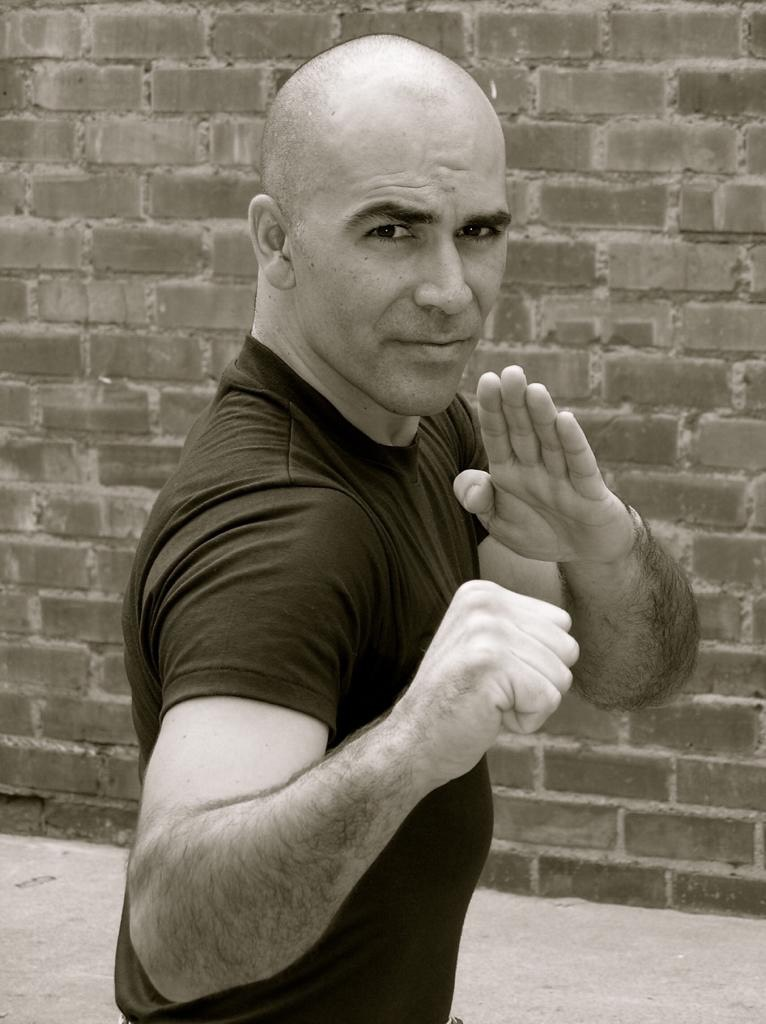
- Born: Eric Anthony Oram; October 13, 1968 (age 57); Las Vegas, Nevada
- Style: Traditional Wing Chun (TWC) Kung Fu
- Teacher: William Cheung
- Rank: Master

Other information
- Spouse: Peggy Croghan
- Notable students: Christian Bale; Jake Gyllenhaal; Robert Downey Jr.

Eric Anthony Oram (born October 13, 1968) is an American Wing Chun Kung Fu practitioner and fight choreographer who introduced a new way of filming fight scenes in the film Sherlock Holmes: A Game of Shadows in which the actors fought with real strikes and attacks, which were then featured in slow motion at 500 frames per second in the final movie. He has trained well known actors in Wing Chun such as Christian Bale for Batman Begins, Jake Gyllenhaal, and in particular Robert Downey Jr. in Iron Man and Sherlock Holmes as his personal on-set consultant in numerous movies. Oram has been credited for training Downey in Kung Fu since 2003 as a way to beat his drug addictions. He wrote a moving letter to judge and California Governor Jerry Brown in support of Downey's pardon.

== Background ==
Oram is one of the leading authorities on Wing Chun kung fu. In 1980 his father Richard sent him to train under William Cheung, the grandmaster of the Traditional Wing Chun lineage, who is a disciple of Ip Man. He started teaching at the age of 16, and over the last 25 years he taught Wing Chun to law enforcement, professional athletes, celebrities, and the general public. He has been a fight choreographer and stuntman for major Hollywood movies for Warner Bros. Pictures and Marvel Studios.

Oram has written numerous articles, and has been featured in, Wing Chun Illustrated, American Health and Fitness, Black Belt Magazine, Inside Kung Fu Magazine, the Los Angeles Times, Men's Journal, Sports Illustrated, and Vanity Fair.

He has appeared on the Oprah Winfrey Show alongside student Robert Downey Jr., whom he has been training since 2003. Oram has been instrumental in helping Downey overcome his drug addictions through Kung Fu training, He then became Downey's personal fight consultant on over a dozen films. Oram has stated in multiple interviews that the most dedicated student he has ever trained is Downey.

Oram also trained Christian Bale in preparation for the Batman Begins trilogy, for which The Dark Knight won the 15th Screen Actors Guild Award for Outstanding Performance by a Stunt Ensemble in a Motion Picture in 2008.

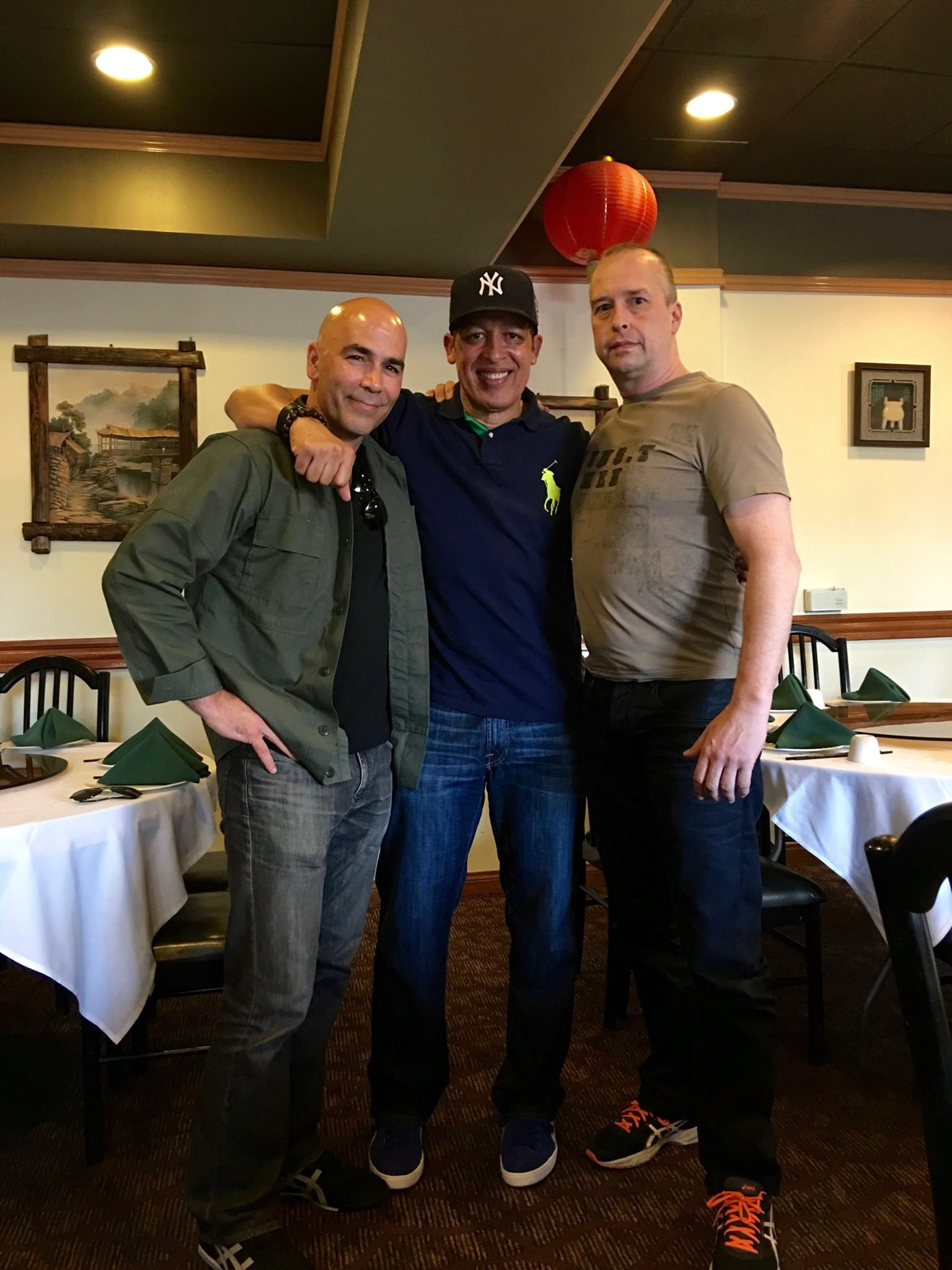
Eric Oram with Kung Fu brothers Brian Laroda and Don Schouten

== Career highlights ==
=== Sherlock Holmes: A Game of Shadows ===
The fight choreography for Sherlock Holmes: A Game of Shadows was different from how it was traditionally done for other movies, and was met with resistance from the production side of the film. The production team felt the fighting was too fast and direct, and they could not see what was being filmed. When the footage was played at 500 frames per second, it was realised that instead of making the movements larger, they could do the opposite. The stuntman was throwing real punches at Downey and he was defending himself, which worked well on film due to the slow motion scenes in the final cut.

Oram was featured in a video from Warner Bros. Home Entertainment's Stunt Schooled series, which went over a sequence that Holmes used in the film. A fan was chosen to learn the Wing Chun moves which Holmes used to take down assailants in a reenactment.

=== Call of Duty: Advanced Warfare ===
Oram worked with a team of 17 motion capture actors and stunt performers in the video game Call of Duty: Advanced Warfare, released in 2014 The game received multiple awards and nominations.

=== Captain America: Civil War ===
Oram coordinated the combat scenes between Iron Man and Captain America in the movie Captain America: Civil War, in which Iron Man and Captain America enter into a conflict philosophically and physically. The fighting strategy Oram adopted for Iron Man was of "minimum force" necessary to win the fight. His goal was to make it look like Iron Man was not trying to kill or be overcome with anger, which would lead to a lack of control. The movie was nominated for the Screen Actors Guild Award for Outstanding Performance by a Stunt Ensemble in a Motion Picture

== Filmography ==
Year	Title	Role	Type
1999-2000	Kiss Toledo Goodbye	Actor	TV show
2009	Sherlock Holmes	Fight consultant	Movie
2010	Iron Man 2	Fight consultant	Movie
2011	Sherlock Holmes: A Game of Shadows	Fight consultant	Movie
2013	House of Lies	Actor	TV show
2013	Iron Man 3	Fight choreographer (stunts), Reluctant AIM Guard (actor)	Movie
2014	Call of Duty: Advanced Warfare	Motion capture actor and stunt performer	Video Game
2015	Chloe & Theo	Sancho (actor)	Movie
2015	Avengers: Age of Ultron	Fight choreographer (for Robert Downey Jr.; stunts)	Movie
2016	Captain America: Civil War	Fight choreographer (for Robert Downey Jr.; stunts)	Movie
2016	Warner Bros: Stunt Schooled	Actor	Series

== Bibliography ==
- Oram, Eric (2011). Modern Wing Chun Kung Fu: A Guide to Practical Combat and Self-Defense. Black Belt Communications, Incorporated. ISBN 9780897502030
