= Anne Pang =

Australian kung fu practitioner

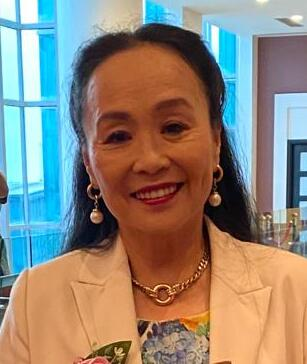
- Pang in 2023
- Born: 23 October 1958 (age 67)
- Occupations: Author, martial artist
- Spouse: Barry Pang
- Children: Chris Pang, John Pang

Chinese name
- Traditional Chinese: 黄碧瑶
- Simplified Chinese: 黄碧瑶
Transcriptions
Standard Mandarin
- Hanyu Pinyin: Huáng Bì-yáo
- IPA: [xwǎŋ pî.jǎʊ]
Yue: Cantonese
- Jyutping: Wong4 Bik1-Jiu4
- IPA: [wɔŋ˩ pɪk̚˥.jiw˩]

Anne Pi-Yau Pang (黄碧瑶 Huang Bi-yao; born 23 October 1958) is a scholar and the author of the first published English books on the life of her great-grandfather, the historical figure Chinese reformer Wong Nai Siong. As a martial artist Pang has developed a system of women's self defence. She is a noted Australian Chinese businesswoman and community figure, speaking publicly on issues of racial discrimination in Australia. Pang ran an art gallery specializing in Australian art. Her son is actor Chris Pang and her husband is the kung fu practitioner and business entrepreneur Barry Pang. Anne is a recipient of the medal of the order of Australia in 2026 for her services to the Australian Chinese community and to women's self defence.

== Early life ==
Pang was born in Taipei, Taiwan, and migrated to Australia in July 1970 at the end of the White Australia policy. She attended Gardener's Road Primary in Sydney and then Randwick Girl's High in Randwick in 1970 and 1971. After moving to Melbourne in 1971, the family lived in Pascoe Vale and she attended Strathmore High School till 1976. After completing her Bachelor of Arts (Hon) at Melbourne University in 1980, she continued with her PhD studies at Monash University in 1997.

She began her martial arts training with Barry Pang in 1974, in the art of Wing Chun. She founded her own style of Women Self Defense based on the art of Wing Chun in 1990. Pang studied history of fine art at Melbourne University as part of her undergraduate and became an art consultant and set up her own business, Artpreciation in 1999. Her interest in her family history led her to research the accounts of her great-grandfather, Huang Naishang in 1996 and this became the subject of her doctorate degree completed in 2009 and first English academic study of Wong Nai Siong.

== Career ==
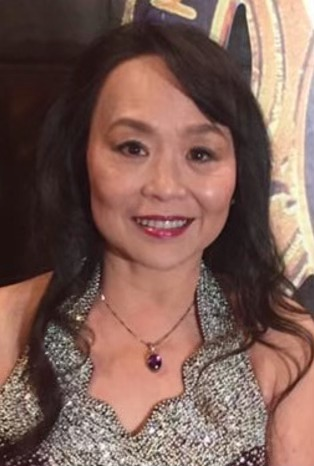
Pang in 2021

Pang's 1996 trip to the Sibu annual celebration of the landing of the Foochows was the catalyst to Pang's interest in the historical accounts of her great-grandfather, Huang Naishang, known as the Moses of China. Discovering very little documentation in English, she began a candidature at Monash University, Clayton campus into the history of Huang Naishang. The dissertation was completed in 2008. The Sibu Foochow Association learning of the thesis, approached Pang with a request to publish the work for the 110th year settlement anniversary. As the original works were in English, it was decided to publish two versions – an English and a Chinese edition. Pang's book is the first full-length scholarly study in English of the Christian journalist and revolutionary Huang Naishang. The front cover of the books is an original painting done by Pang which also contributed to a graphic novel written by her son Chris for the Centenary celebration of the New Fuzhhou settlement in 2001. A second edition of the book on Huang to be published ten years after the first edition. This second edition is to celebrate the 120th anniversary of the New Fuzhou settlement in Sibu in March 2021. Further publications include authoring chapters on Huang Naishang in the 'Studies in Light and Salt' book series, published in both English and Chinese. A third edition of the book was launched at the 122nd anniversary celebration of the New Fuzhou settlement in March 2023 where it was noted copies were held at 20 major libraries around the world.

In 2012 Pang and her son Chris worked on a screenplay about Wong Nai Siong's life and attempted to get funding for a feature film.

Pang studied the history of fine art at Melbourne University as part of her Bachelor of Arts (Hon) degree and became an art consultant. She set up her own business, Artpreciation in 1999 dealing in Australian fine art. It dealt primarily with Australian paintings and focused on growing a burgeoning Australian art market. Upon retirement from the art market, The Barry & Anne Pang Collection was auctioned off in 2015.

She has spoken publicly as a leading member of the Chinese Australian community on how the Australian Federal Government's rhetoric on China in 2021/2022 has led to increased hostility towards Asian Australians under the Liberal Australian Government. Pang assisted with developing surveys into Chinese Australian experience of racism and conducted Women's Self defence courses for the community. She observed that "Racism has worsened in the last three years. And it's a bit of surprise to people that it's not just due to COVID-19 but before COVID-19 as well." She has been campaigning to make the Australian political parties aware of how their political weaponisation of China is playing out at the community level in Australia.

Pang was acting president for the Chinese Community Council of Australia 2013 – 2014 and is Honorary President of the Lion's Sino-Innovation Club from 2015.

== Martial arts ==
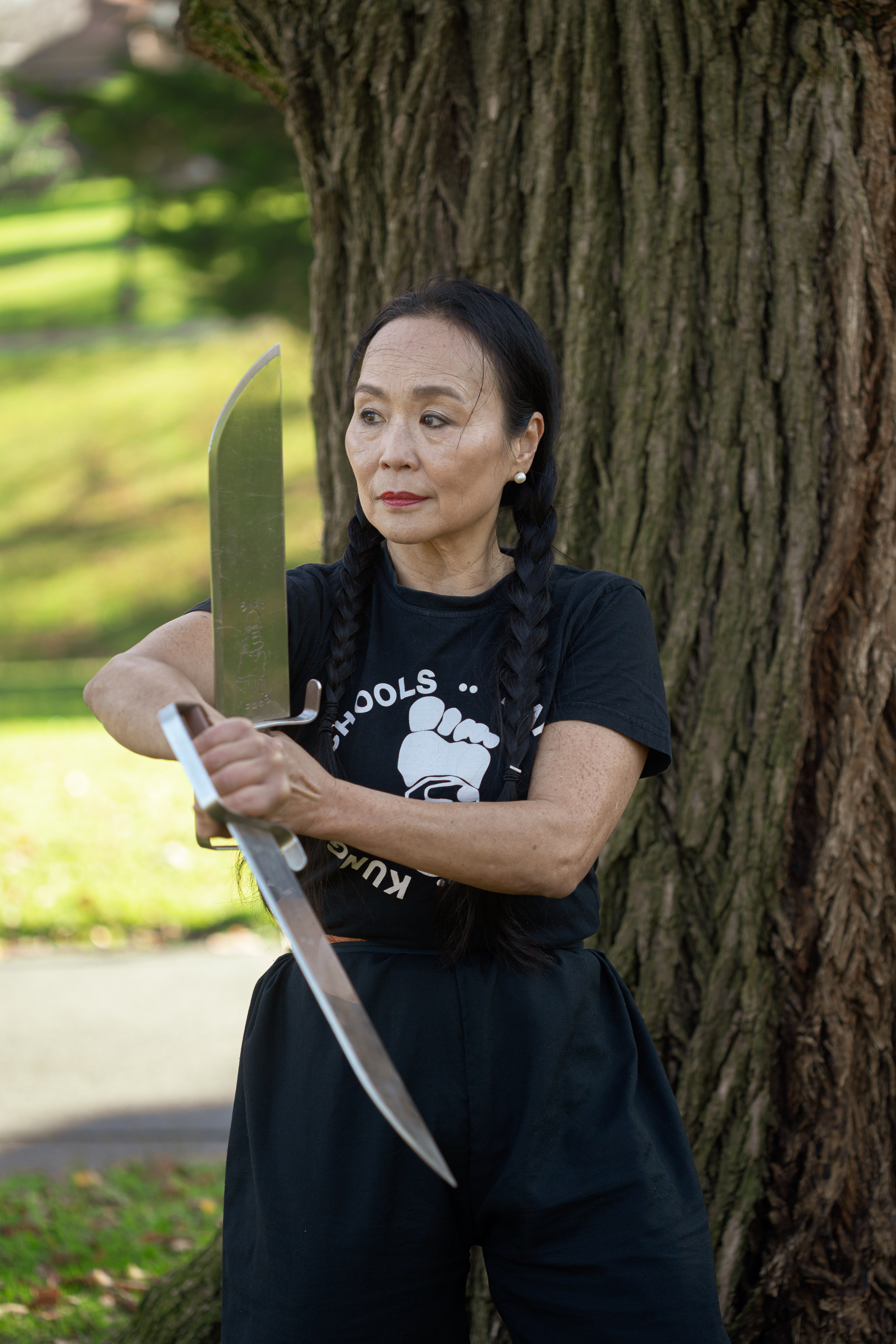
Anne Pang training Kung Fu in Park.

Pang met her instructor and later husband, Barry, in July 1974. She began training in the art of Wing Chun and some Choy Lee Fut at the age of 15 after being fascinated by Wuxia comics and Kung fu films as a child. Anne Pang began competing in the open martial arts tournaments that were appearing in Australia in the late 1970s and 1980s, frequently winning both form and sparring competitions.

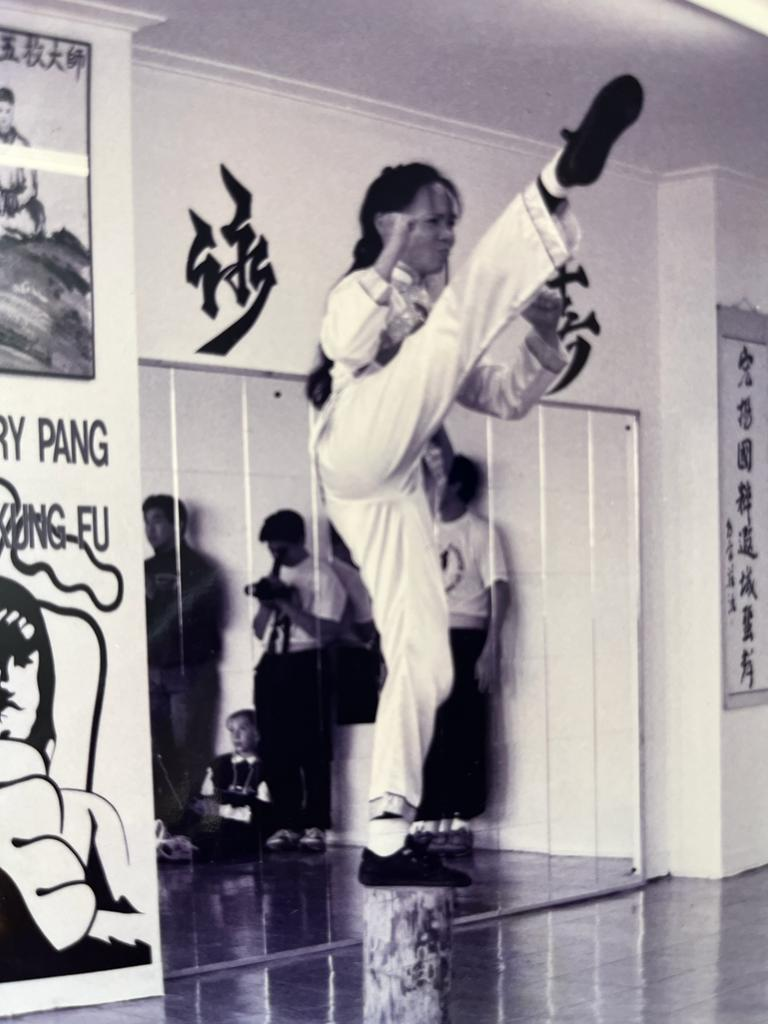
Anne Pang - holding roundhouse kick balanced on wooden stump

Pang founded her own style of women's self-defence in 1990, incorporating six basic techniques of Wing Chun, Choy Lee Fut and Lung Ying and has taught this program to Melbourne schools, universities, and business organisations. Pang received a Blitz hall of fame tribute award for her efforts in female self-defence instruction and has incorporated the training program into community outreach and charity work. In 2021 Pang begun an instructors course in women's self defence. In 2021 the women's self defence 'train the trainer course' was established in Victoria University, Melbourne. In 2023, the City of Melbourne funded a series of women's awareness and self defence videos in partnership with LEADAA where Anne was the martial arts advisor for the project.

In the early 1990s, Pang met Wu Hua Tai, a Southern Dragon Kung Fu (Lung Ying) practitioner who was a senior student of Grandmaster Lam Yiu Gwai. Anne and Barry Pang began practicing Lung Ying, Liuhebafa and Tai Chi in addition to Wing Chun. They trained under Wu Hua Tai until his death in 2002.

== Awards ==
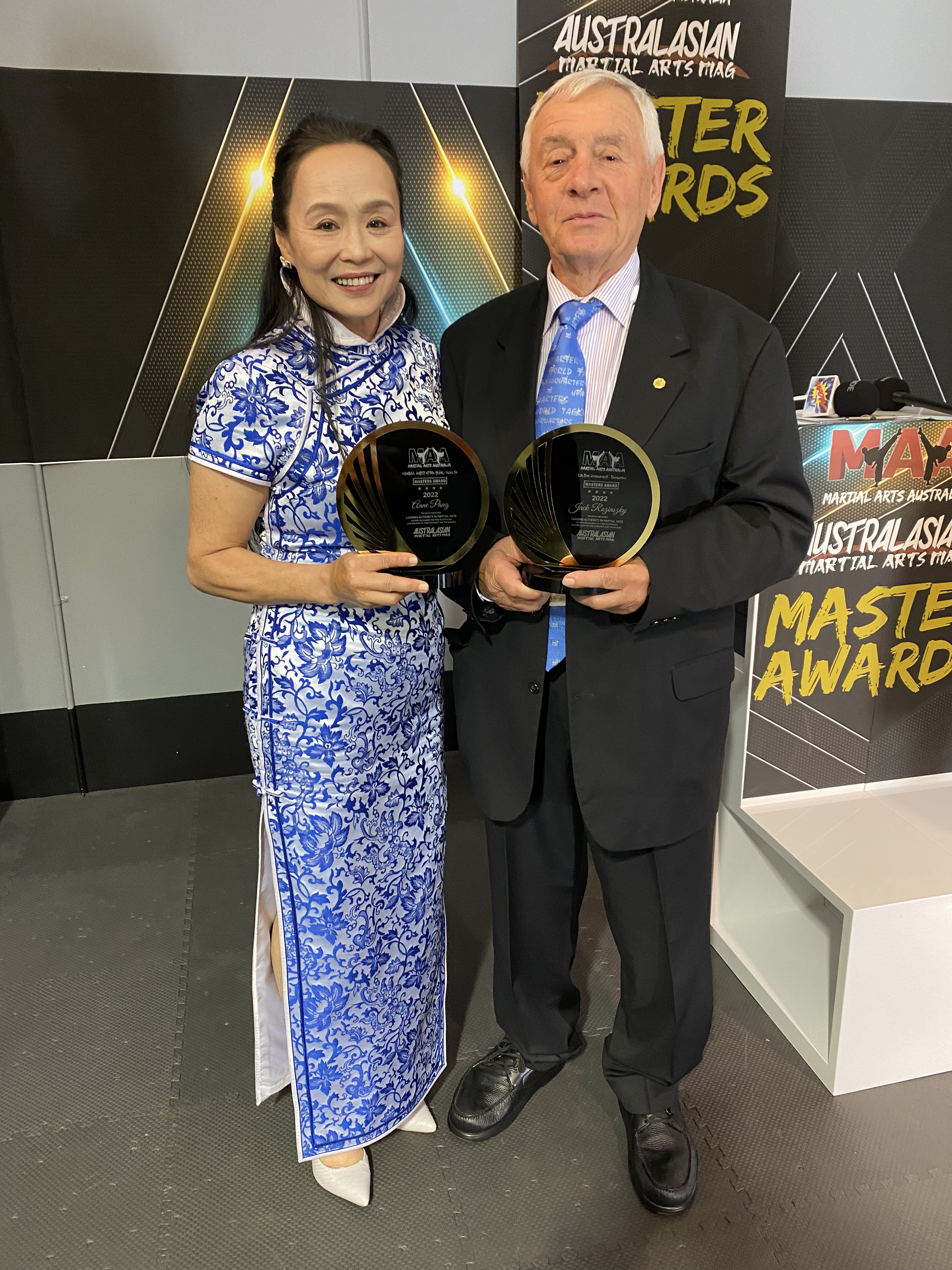
Dr Anne Pang receiving 2022 Australasian Martial Arts award for Kung Fu, with Taekwondo's Jack Rozinsky

1998, Blitz Hall of Fame Award, Tribute Award for Female Self Defence Instructions.

2022, Australasian Martial Arts Magazine Masters Martial Artists of the Year - Kung Fu.

2026, Recipient of the 'Female Empowerment award' from HerWell, a community organisation dedicated to empowering Chinese women in Australia.

2026, In June as part of the Kings Birthday Honours, Anne was awarded Medal of the Order of Australia (OAM) for her services to the Chinese Australian community and for her work with teaching women's self defence. The award recognises her work in building understanding between the local Chinese and broader Australian community. The award was also in recognition of 50 years of practicing and teaching kung-fu and running self defence programs that specifically cater to the needs of women.

== Horse racing career ==
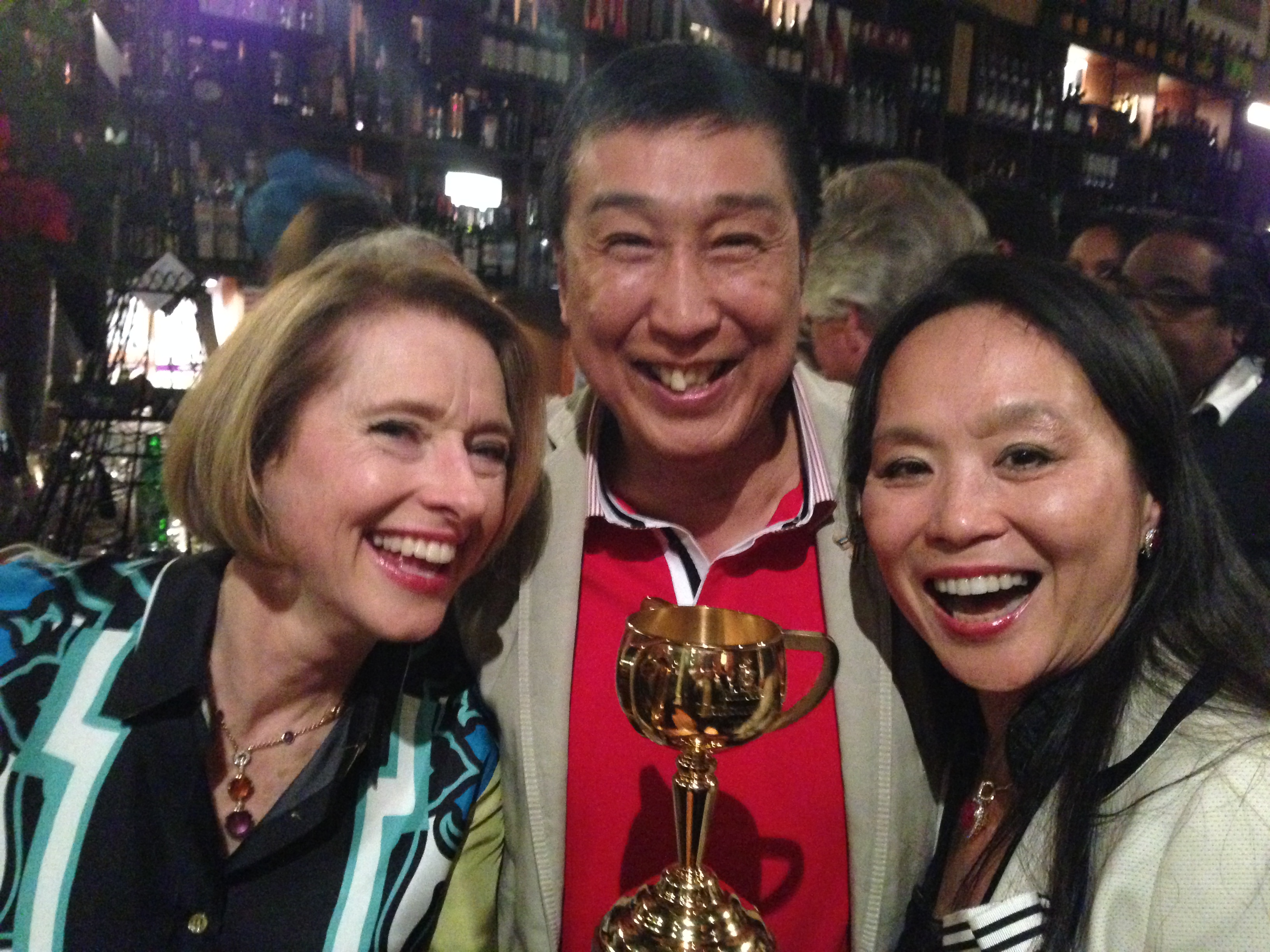
Anne and Barry Pang with Gai Waterhouse after winning race.

Pang is involved in Australian horse racing along with her husband Barry. Together they are owners of horses that have won group 1 races. Marwong won the Caulfield Guineas in 1987. Pang was a part-owner of the Melbourne Cup 2013 winner horse Fiorente under friend and trainer Gai Waterhouse. In 2019 Cape Of Good Hope won the Caulfield Stakes with trainer David Hayes.
