= William Cheung =

Chinese-born Australian Grandmaster of Wing Chun Kung Fu

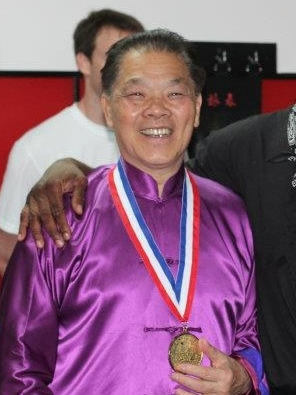
- Cheung in 2011
- Born: October 10, 1940 (age 86); Hong Kong
- Other names: 張卓慶, Cheung Cheuk-hing
- Style: Traditional Wing Chun (TWC) Kung Fu
- Teacher: Ip Man
- Rank: Grandmaster

Other information
- Notable students: Eric Oram; Anthony Arnett
- Website: www.cheungsmartialarts.com

William Cheung or Cheung Cheuk-hing (張卓慶, pinyin: Zhāng Zhuóqìng) (born 10 October 1940) is a Hong Kong Wing Chun kung fu practitioner and the Grandmaster of his lineage, Traditional Wing Chun (TWC). He is also founder of the Global Traditional Wing Chun Kung Fu Federation (GTWCKFA), the sanctioning body of TWC. Cheung has received the Masters Award for lifetime achievement in Kung Fu from Martial Arts Australia.

Cheung was responsible for introducing Bruce Lee to his master, Ip Man, when they were teenagers in Hong Kong.

== Biography ==
In the 1950s, Cheung grew up in Kowloon, where fighting skills were valued as a measure of self-worth and pride. At the age of 11, he began participating in challenge matches on the school playground, practicing Tai Chi Chuan, which was insufficient to distinguish him among Hong Kong's youth. His fighting concerned his father, a police inspector, who disapproved of such behavior; as a result, Cheung avoided involvement in gangs. However, by his teenage years, the challenge fights continued, and—given their connection to the extortion rackets of secret societies—Cheung became a source of embarrassment to his high-achieving family.

Around 1954, a turning point in Cheung's life came when he witnessed a gang leader, undefeated in combat, challenge an elderly man who was rumored to practice a lesser-known Kung Fu style created by a woman. Cheung watched as the thin, older man—Ip Man—quickly defeated the gang leader. Impressed by Ip Man's skill, Cheung approached him and became his student. Over the next few months, Cheung became a live-in student for three years before eventually leaving Hong Kong.

=== Friendship with Bruce Lee ===
During his time living with Ip Man, Cheung introduced a then 15-year-old Bruce Lee, a famous child actor whom he had first met at Lee's ninth birthday, to Ip Man. Initially, Ip Man rejected Bruce's request to learn Wing Chun Kung Fu due to a longstanding rule in the Chinese martial arts community that forbade teaching foreigners; Lee’s one-quarter German heritage from his mother's side presented an obstacle. However, Cheung advocated on Lee's behalf, and eventually, Lee was accepted into the school.

Cheung and Lee became friends and training partners. After several months of daily training, they both became increasingly involved in street challenge fights. One day, Cheung fought a triad leader and seriously injured him, prompting his father to send him away from Hong Kong to keep him out of harm's way. However, trouble continued to follow him, and eventually, he and his family decided it would be safer for him to migrate to Australia to begin a new life.

=== Later life ===
Cheung left Hong Kong and moved to Canberra, Australia, to study economics at the Australian National University. In 1965, he founded the first Wing Chun Kung Fu club at the university. After graduating in 1969 with a bachelor’s degree in economics, Cheung fully immersed himself in Wing Chun theory and practice, working closely with a group of dedicated students.

In 1973, Cheung founded a martial arts school in Melbourne, Australia, and in 1976, he was elected president of the Australian Kung Fu Federation. Since 1979, Cheung and some of his students have directed programs for specialized groups within the U.S. military and other countries.

In September 1986, William Cheung was attacked by 24-year-old Emin Boztepe, a Wing Chun practitioner from the EWTO, while conducting a seminar in Cologne, West Germany.

== Accomplishments ==
=== Teaching traditional Wing Chun ===
After moving to Melbourne, Australia, to teach Traditional Wing Chun professionally in 1973, Cheung established his Wing Chun studio in the city's central business district. According to The Sydney Morning Herald, his studio attracts hundreds of new students each year. In early 1976, Cheung helped establish the Australian National Kung Fu Federation and became its president. The federation began organizing the Australasian Kung Fu Championships around 1977–1978, which were among the earliest full-contact tournaments in Australia open to all styles of martial arts.

Cheung also trained students in the U.S., including some who went on to have successful martial arts careers. One notable student, Eric Oram, later trained Robert Downey Jr. and Christian Bale in preparation for their Hollywood movie roles.

He also trained Anthony Arnett, who has been winning martial arts tournaments since 1974 and has earned the title of grand champion multiple times, including streaks of three and six consecutive years in different tournament circuits.

Cheung taught unarmed combat to the U.S. Marines of the Seventh Fleet, based in Yokosuka, Japan.

=== Martial arts ===
Cheung was recognized as one of Ip Man’s disciples who helped establish Wing Chun's reputation as a fighting art through the challenge matches in Hong Kong.

In 1984, Cheung set a world speed punching record of 8.3 punches per second at Harvard University in Boston.

=== Awards ===
- Black Belt Hall of Fame Award – Kung Fu Artist of the Year, 1983
- Inside Kung Fu Hall of Fame Award – Instructor of the Year, 1989

=== Magazine front covers ===
Over a 28-year period, Cheung was featured on the front cover of 35 magazines, from 1982 to 2010. The first was Inside Kung Fu in October 1982, and the most recent was Martial Arts Illustrated in April 2010.

== Academia ==
Cheung attained a Bachelor of Economics from the Australian National University after graduating from secondary school in Hong Kong. He is a certified Doctor of Chinese Medicine under the Chinese Medicine Registration Board of Victoria and a member of the Australian Chinese Traditional Orthopaedics Association Inc. Additionally, he has been invited as a guest professor to Foshan Sports University (China) and as a senior research professor in the bone research department at Beijing Chinese Medical University (China).

== Bibliography ==
- Cheung, William (1983). Wing Chun Bil Jee, the Deadly Art of Thrusting Fingers. Unique Publications. p. 160. ISBN 978-0-86568-045-6.
- Cheung, William (1986). Kung Fu: Butterfly Swords. Ohara Publications Inc. pp. 223. ISBN 0-89750-125-X
- Cheung, William; Mike Lee (1986). How to Develop Chi Power. Black Belt Communications. p. 192. ISBN 978-0-89750-110-1.
- Cheung, William; Mike Lee (1989). Kung Fu Dragon Pole. Black Belt Communications. p. 128. ISBN 978-0-89750-107-1.
- Cheung, William; Mike Lee (1988). Advanced Wing Chun. Black Belt Communications. p. 256. ISBN 978-0-89750-118-7.
- Cheung, William; Ted Wong (1990). Wing Chun Kung Fu/Jeet Kune Do: a Comparison Volume 1. Black Belt Communications. p. 192. ISBN 978-0-89750-124-8.
- Cheung, William (1989). My Life with Wing Chun (second edition). pp. 192.
- Cheung, William (2007). Wing Chun: Advanced Training and Applications. Black Belt Communications LLC. pp. 175. ISBN 0-89750-157-8. ISBN 978-0-89750-157-6.
- Cheung, William (2005). City of Dragons: Ah Hing – The Dragon Warrior. Healthworld Enterprises Pty. Ltd. pp. 118.
- Cheung, William (1994). CMT: Cheung's Meridian Therapy. Cheung's Better Life. pp. 388.

=== Videos ===
Cheung has produced a number of videos, including:

- The Wing Chun Way
- Tao of Wing Chun
- My Life with Wing Chun
- Wing Chun – Advanced Training and Applications
- City of Dragons
- CMT – Cheung's Meridian Therapy
- PRO-TEKT: A Personal Protection Program
