= Yuen Kay-shan =

Chinese martial artist

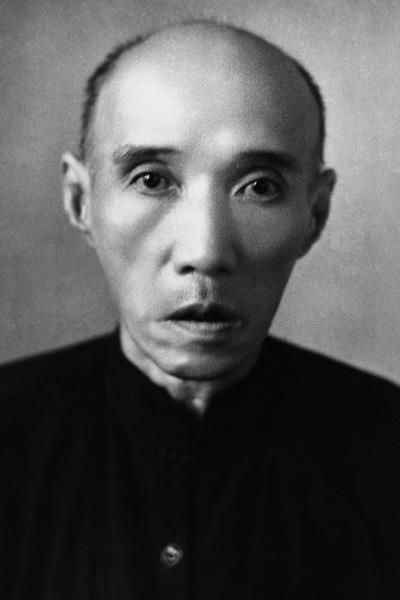
- Born: 1889; Foshan, Qing Dynasty
- Died: 1956 (aged 66–67); Foshan, China
- Other names: Foshan Yuen Lo-jia (Yuen the Fifth of Foshan)
- Style: Wing Chun
- Teachers: Fok Bo-chuen (霍保全); Fung Siu-ching (馮少青); Wong Wah-bo "Dai Fa Min" Kam
- Rank: Grandmaster

Other information
- Occupation: Martial artist
- Notable relatives: Yuen Chai-wan (Brother); Yuen Jo-tong (Grandson)
- Notable students: Sum Nung

Chinese name
- Traditional Chinese: 阮奇山
Transcriptions
Standard Mandarin
- Hanyu Pinyin: Ruǎn Qíshān
Yue: Cantonese
- Yale Romanization: Yún Kèih-sāan

Vietnamese name
- Vietnamese: Nguyễn Kỳ Sơn

Yuen Kay-shan (Chinese: 阮奇山; Cantonese Yale: Yún Kèih-sāan; pinyin: Ruǎn Qíshān), nicknamed Yuen Lo-jia (Chinese: 阮老揸; Cantonese Yale: Yún Lóuh Jā; pinyin: Ruǎn Lǎo Zhā) was a Grandmaster of Wing Chun. The youngest of five brothers, he became known as "Foshan Yuen Lo-jia" (Yuen the Fifth of Foshan). He was the fifth child of wealthy firework monopoly owner Yuen Chong Ming, and was known as an undefeated champion of 1000 death duels during the 1920-1950s representing the Wing Chun.

== Wing Chun studies ==
Yuen's family ancestral estate home was named Song Yuen (Mulberry Gardens), and located in Foshan, China. Initially, Kay-shan's father paid for him and his older brother Yuen Chai-wan to become students of Fok Bo-Chuen (Chinese: 霍保全; Cantonese Yale: Fok Bóu Chyùhn; pinyin: Huò Bǎoquán; also transliterated "Kwok Bo-chuen").Wong Wah-bo and "Dai Fa Min" Kam from the Red Boat Opera Company also taught Yuen Kay-shan.

Yuen Kay-shan and his older brother Yuen Chai-wan had developed an interest in the martial arts. Yuen Kay-shan's older brother Yuen Chai-wan was known as "Pock Skin Chai" and later became the founder of Yiu Choi and Vietnamese Branches of Wing Chun. Their father Yuen Chong Ming housed and paid a large sum of money to imperial constable Fok Bo Chuen to teach both of the Yuen brothers Wing Chun. From Fok Bo-chuen, Yuen learned all the extensive open hand patterns in Wing Chun, he structured them into and created three forms, Siu Lien Tau, Chum Kiu and the Biu Jee. In addition he mastered the knives, six and a half point pole and the flying darts. He had also been taught the Wooden Dummy, Bamboo Dummy and several different jong variations, as well as Red Sand Palm.

Later, Ma Bok-Leung, Jiu Gan-Heung, Lo Hao-Po, Ng Ngau Si, Leung Yan as well as Yuen Kay-shan and his brother, invited Fung Siu-Ching to come and teach. Fung stayed at the Yuen ancestral home, where the two brothers combined the teachings of their past and present teacher. From Fung Siu Ching they learned his skills in close body applications which included the kum Na, Fa Kum Na, body wrapping, sweeping, breaking and throwing skills. Fung Siu Chiong was a disciple of red boat master Dai Fai Min Kam. The Yuens cared for Fung Siu Ching until his death in 1936. 1936 also marked the year when Yuen Kay-shan and Yuen Chai-wan had gone their separate ways. Yuen's brother eventually was invited to teach in Vietnam, where he founded the Nguyễn Tế-Công branch (Vietnam WingChun 永春) branch of the art. Yuen Kay-shan remained in Foshan, where he became friends with other Wing Chun notables like Ip Man, Yiu Choi, Yip Chung Hong, Lai Hip Chi, Tong Gai and others. Yuen Kay-shan became close enough with Yip Man that he taught Yip's son, Yip Chun, the first form of the art.

In addition to having a high caliber skill in Wing Chun, Yuen Kay-shan had also been an educated man who had worked as a part-time lawyer. By being an educated individual he was also one of the first Wing Chun masters to document the theories, concepts, philosophies and strategies of the system. He is also considered a major contributor to luk dim boon gwun and had at one point was even challenged by a monk from Jianxi Province. Death waivers had been signed and the duel took place in the Palace of 1000 years longevity. Both fighters were armed with iron poles. Yuen Kay-shan disarmed the monk and spared his life in the duel, not only demonstrating his skills in kung fu but also demonstrating his nobility as a martial artist. Yuen Kay-shan never looked for fights, but when challenges could not be avoided, he took them as learning opportunities. Of the 1000 death duels Yuen Kay-shan fought in, he was never defeated.

Yuen's disciple Sum Nung initially didn't believe he could learn anything from Yuen, because he was already proficient with the Wing Chun he had learnt from Cheung Bo. As a test Yuen placed a raw egg in each of his two pockets and challenged Sum to break an egg while he stood in the middle of a circle on the ground. Sam could not break an egg or even push Yuen out of the circle; this convinced Sum that he could learn a lot from Yuen and he became Yuen's disciple.

== Ip Man movie controversy ==
Sin Kwok-lam (Ip Man's son's student and producer) apologized and served tea to Yuen Jo Tong for misrepresenting his grandfather Yuen Kay-shan's reputation and status in Wing Chun history. (In the movie, Yuen was portrayed as Ip Man's younger kung fu brother, not as skillful as Ip Man). This had the Yuen and Yiu families criticize the movie in interviews. After the Yuen and Yiu families voiced their displeasure about Yuen's portrayal in the movie on Ip Man, movie producer Kwok Si-lam and co-producer Ip Chun apologized six times and "served tea" to Yuen Kay-san's grandson, Yuen Jo Tong, for misrepresenting, and being disrespectful to, the legendary 1000 death duel champion during the 1920-1950s, Yuen Kay-shan.

== Three Heroes of Wing Chun ==
Yao Wing Ken (Yoa Choy's grandson) explains that, "in the old days of Foshan, his grandfather Yao Choy, Ip Man and Yuen Kay-shan were called the "Three Heroes of Wing Chun" and often mentioned together. Yuen Kay-shan's disciple Leung Jan Sing also provided an ancestral document indicating that Yuen studied with Fung Siu-ching, while Ip Man and others studied under Yuen. This record was passed down in the 1970s. Although Ip Man is not necessarily Yuen's official student, in the order of seniority on the family tree, Yuen ranked at the first level, with Ip Man being last. It would be normal for Ip Man to ask Yuen Kay-shan for instruction.

Below is the original Chinese quoted from the original article in the Dayoo Newspaper of Guangzhou:

“咏春三雄”齐名

姚永强介绍，当年在佛山，他的爷爷姚才与叶问、阮奇山并称“咏春三雄”，三人齐名，武功不相上下。阮奇山的徒孙梁湛声还提供了祖传的记录，记录上写明， 阮奇山师从冯少青，而叶问与其他多个咏春武者一同在阮奇山的门下。“这本记录是上世纪70年代留下的， 这也不能说叶问是他的徒弟，但论资历，阮奇山排第 一，叶问最后，叶问向他请教很正常。.

== Lineage ==
Lineage in Wing Chun
sifus	Fok Bo-Chuen (霍保全); Fung Siu-Ching (馮少青); Wong Wah-bo "Dai Fa Min" Kam.
Yuen Kay-shan (阮奇山)
students	Sum Nung (岑能); Wong Jing
