= William Kwok =

Chinese-American martial artist and researcher of martial arts education

- 郭威賢
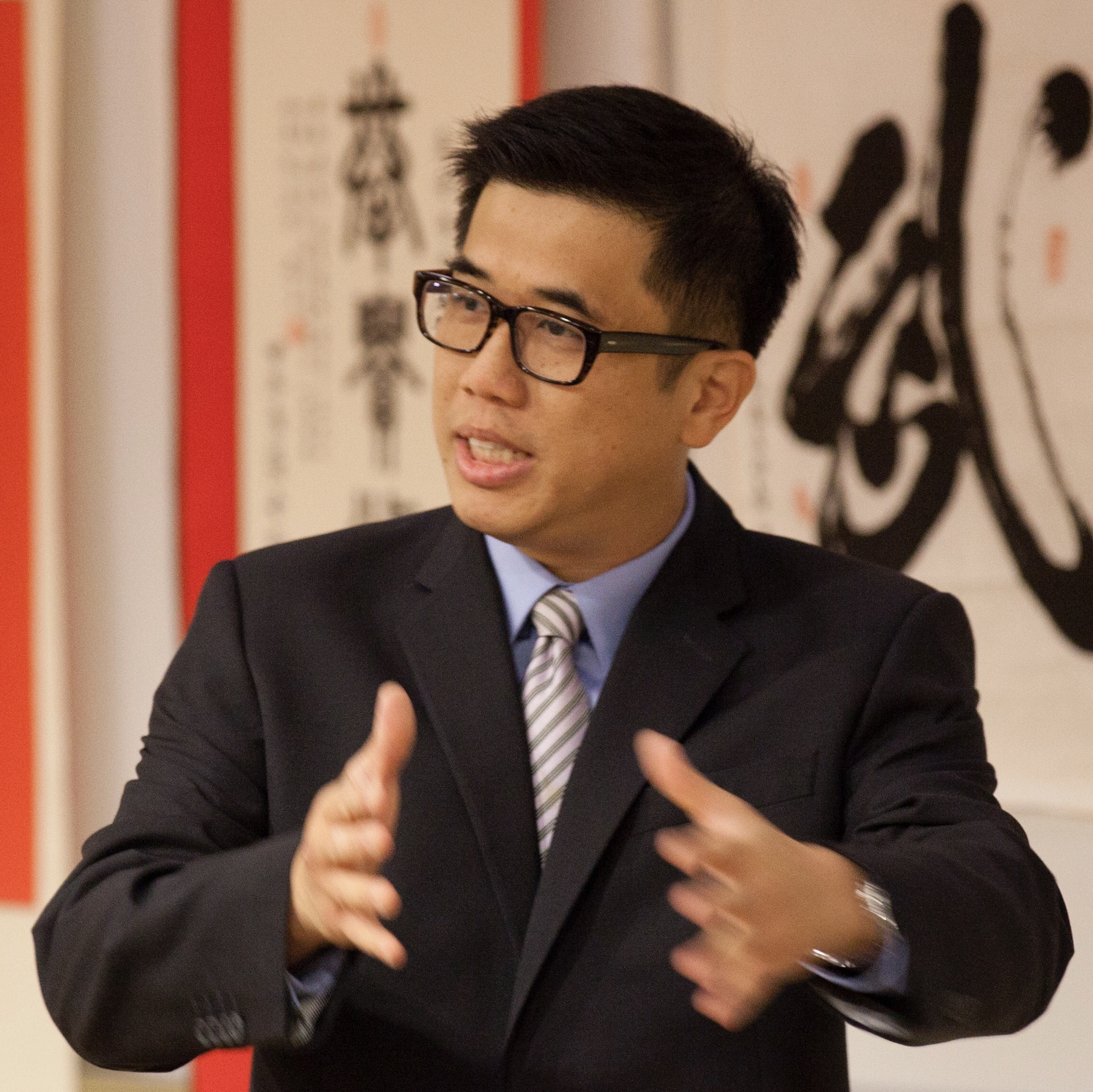
- Kwok at Hong Kong Baptist University
- Born: 1972 (age 53–54); Hong Kong
- Education: Northeastern University (EdD), Harvard University (ALM), St. John's University (MBA)
- Occupations: Martial Arts Educator, Community Safety Advocate
- Known for: Practical Wing Chun; community safety education

William Wai-Yin Kwok (Chinese: 郭威賢; born 1972) is a Chinese-American martial arts educator and community safety advocate. He is the founder of the Martial Arts Education Society (MAES), a non-profit organization that promotes martial arts education and community engagement. In 2025, MAES collaborated with community and city partners to launch Safe · Seen · Strong, a citywide initiative promoting community safety education. He also served as the co-chair of Harvard Alumni for Education in New York City.

== Martial Arts Background ==
William Kwok is the elder son of Kwok Yuen-wah, a physical education professor who introduced Wing Chun and movement science to Kwok. Prior to learning Practical Wing Chun from Wan Kam-leung, Kwok trained in various martial arts systems including traditional Taekwondo, under Kim Suk-jun, a disciple of Choi Hong-hi. Kwok is credited with introducing Practical Wing Chun to America.

Wing Chun Illustrated writes:

"Like the famous monk Xuanzang in the classic Chinese novel Journey to the West, who journeyed to India in quest of the Buddhist scriptures, Kwok helps bring Practical Wing Chun to America, teaching Westerners how to understand and decode this ancient, yet still modern, Gung Fu style."

In 2007, Kwok established Gotham Martial Arts School in New York City. In May 2013, he hosted Wan Kam-leung's first ever American open seminar in New York City. In November 2014, China Central Television produced a documentary, “A Man and Wing Chun”, in which he was featured. In September 2017, he was invited as a guest presenter at the first Wong Shun-leung Ving Tsun North America seminar in Los Angeles, California.

== Academic Background ==
Kwok holds a Doctor of Education degree from Northeastern University; his research is associated with martial arts-based mindfulness and strategies for integrating martial arts-based mindfulness into educational settings. Kwok is acknowledged for improving teaching and learning methods and analyzing martial arts techniques with modern movement science. Besides learning movement science from his father, he studied physical education at Columbia University. Before promoting martial arts education in America, he taught business studies as an adjunct professor at City University of New York. Kwok also earned a Master of Liberal Arts degree from Harvard University. He considers the mentorship of his thesis director, historian Philip A. Kuhn, as the "hallmark of his time at Harvard".

== Martial Arts Education and Development ==
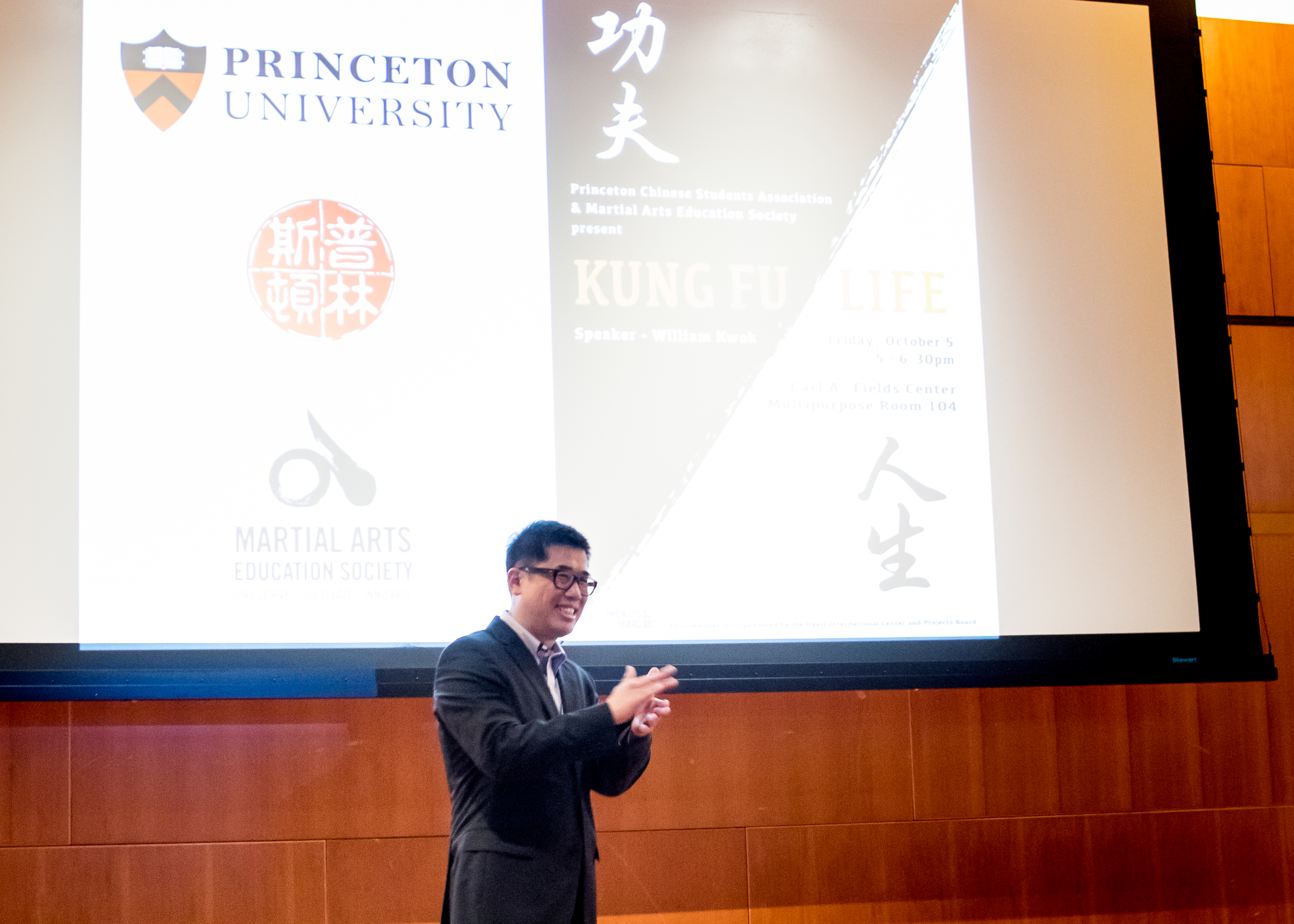
William Kwok presenting an interactive martial arts education seminar entitled "Kung Fu · Life" at Princeton University

Kwok is credited as one of the key people who systemized Practical Wing Chun study into a modern-day training program. He promotes the concepts of martial skills and teaching skills as two different skill sets, and that martial arts teachers' training should include teachers education such as curriculum design and analysis, motor learning, and teaching methods. In addition, he emphasizes the need to balance physical training of technique with philosophical training of the mind "like Yin and Yang...complementing and supplementing each other", believing that a strong sense of culture and humility - what he calls "martial virtue" - are critical to the study of martial arts and the improvement of the martial artist.

In 2016, Kwok appeared in a feature by Radio Free Asia where he elaborated on the moral and educational dimensions of Wing Chun as a means of character cultivation.

In 2018, Kwok founded and acts as president of Martial Arts Education Society with the mission of “bringing self-discipline and hope back to our communities." He also developed a program called Martial Mind, a social-emotional learning program for elementary schools.

In March 2018, Kwok was invited as a guest speaker to share his knowledge of martial arts education and Chinese culture in an academic seminar hosted by Harvard Chinese Students and Scholars Association titled "Is Chinese Martial Arts Facing Challenges?" (in Chinese: 中華武術遭遇挑戰？) at Harvard Graduate School of Education.

In October 2018, Kwok presented a seminar he titled "Kung Fu · Life" to students of Princeton University, discussing the philosophy behind martial arts, as well as describing the five sensory systems - the visual, auditory, olfactory, tactile, and proprioceptive systems - which he believes are important in Wing Chun training and self-defense.

== Community Engagement and Education ==
Kwok is actively involved in promoting social justice through the practice of martial arts. He has collaborated with several community-based organizations to organize self-defense and safety workshops and zoominars. Kwok's self-defense philosophy highlights the significance of sensory perception and body language as essential skills that empower individuals to take control of their safety.

Additionally, Kwok serves as the executive director of short films, 'Kung Fu Grandma' and 'Kung Fu Scriptures,' which have gained attention for their message of promoting self-defense education and anti-discrimination.

In 2023, Kwok hosted several community events to commemorate the 50th anniversary of Bruce Lee’s passing and to promote cultural understanding and self-defense techniques within the Asian American community.

Kwok also co-produced ‘Bruce’ with the Bruce Lee Foundation, a short film tribute exploring immigrant identity and family themes, emphasizing resilience and self-discovery through Bruce Lee’s philosophy. In 2026, 'Bruce' was selected for the Cinequest Film & Creativity Festival in the “Best Narrative Short: Drama” category.

In 2025, Kwok collaborated with Homecrest Community Services, The Asian American Foundation (TAAF), and the New York City Office for the Prevention of Hate Crimes (OPHC) through the Martial Arts Education Society (MAES) to launch "Safe · Seen · Strong", a citywide community-safety education initiative with a focus on Asian communities. The program began in September with a workshop in Brooklyn introducing Kwok’s SAFE framework (Awareness, Boundaries, Counter, De-escalation) for personal protection and his SAFER framework (Support, Alert, Focus Shift, Evidence, Respond) for bystander intervention. OPHC Executive Director Vijah Ramjattan participated in the event, which was described as the first step toward expanding similar workshops across New York City’s five boroughs. In October 2025, Kwok led a follow-up 3S community safety workshop in Queens, emphasizing that safety grows from community understanding and mutual trust rather than physical defense alone.

== Recognition ==
- In 2014, Kwok was a recipient of the Honor Award from the Martial Arts History Museum.
- In 2015, Kwok received a Community Leadership Award from the President's Council on Fitness, Sports and Nutrition.
- In 2017, Kwok became the World Ving Tsun Athletic Association's first recipient of the Silver Achievement Award.
- In 2018, Kwok was presented with the Certificate of Merit and a citation of his contribution to promoting Martial Arts and Chinese culture by New York State Assemblyman Peter Abbate. The following year, he received a Certificate of Special Congressional Recognition from US Congressman Max Rose.
- In 2023, Kwok was awarded the Certificate of Accomplishment by New York State Senator Iwen Chu and the Certificate of Appreciation by New York State Senator John Liu.
