= Wong Shun-leung =

Hong Kong martial artist

- Born: 8 May 1935, (农历)五月八; British Hong Kong
- Died: 28 January 1997 (aged 61); British Hong Kong; Stroke
- Native name: 黃淳樑
- Other names: King of Talking Hands (講手王)
- Style: Chinese martial arts Wing Chun
- Teacher: Ip Man
- Rank: Grandmaster

Other information
- Spouse: Chow Man-fong
- Children: 1
- Notable students: Philip Ng, Stephen Chow, Wan Kam-leung, Bruce Lee

Wong Shun-leung (Chinese: 黃淳樑; pinyin: Huang Chunliáng; Jyutping: Wong4 Seon4-loeng4; 8 May 1935 – 28 January 1997)^{[a]} was a Hong Kong martial artist who studied Wing Chun kung fu under Yip Man (葉問) and was credited with training Bruce Lee. In interviews, Wong claimed to have won at least 60, and perhaps over 100, street fights against martial artists of various styles, though these numbers cannot be independently confirmed. Due to his reputation, his students and admirers referred to him as 'Gong Sau Wong' (講手王 or 'King of Talking Hands'). Wong recorded one instructional film entitled Wing Chun: The science of in-fighting.

== Early martial arts training ==
Wong reportedly trained in several martial art styles in his youth, primarily in Tai Chi and either boxing or kickboxing. He abandoned boxing because of two incidents: one with his boxing coach and one with Ip Man. The first incident apparently occurred because Wong accidentally struck his boxing coach during sparring. The angry coach attacked in earnest, only to be eventually knocked out by Wong; the incident caused Wong to leave boxing. In another account, however, Wong said he had defeated his boxing coach with wing chun techniques: "I was sparring with my instructor and I hit him very hard, he got real mad and came at me very hard. I fought back with wing chun and he ended up bleeding. Boxing was over for me!"

=== First encounter with Ip Man ===
The second incident came about from Wong's fascination with the stories of legendary wing chun figures, such as Chan Wah-shun (陳華順) and Leung Jan (梁贊). This interest led Wong to look for a wing chun teacher. Friends of his older brother took him to meet Ip Man. According to one version of events, after defeating at least two of Yip's students, Wong had a match with Yip himself and was defeated easily. Another version is that after Wong faced Lo Man-kam, later Yip Po-ching dealt with Wong. In any case, Wong joined the wing chun group and eventually came to assist Yip with teaching, with students including Bruce Lee.

== Behind the scenes teacher of Bruce Lee ==
Grandmaster Ip Man once spoke to Wong after Lee achieved superstardom "如果没有你的多方鼓励和指导，李小龙断无今日的成就" ("Without your guidance and encouragement, Bruce Lee wouldn't be having such achievement").

Bruce Lee once wrote in a letter to Wong, "Even though I am (technically) a student of Ip Man, in reality I learned my Kung-fu from you." Wong was believed to have carried the letter in his wallet. Perhaps the best-known letter from Lee to Wong is that of 11 January 1970, which has been translated into English as an appendix to an article by Wong.

In 1970 Bruce Lee wrote a letter in Chinese to Wong Shun-leung:

淳樑兄,
很久沒有通信你好嗎？邵在湧(Alan Chaw)從加拿大來信，有問及你借我用的8mm電影，我真是十分道歉，因為多次搬屋以遺失，本來是很磨耗的了，故之很少用而失了，十分抱歉。
我在BEL-AIR買了一新屋，有半英畝大，很多樹是牧場風格，在山頂上近Beverly Hills。再者，除了我的兒子Brandon外，我有一位七個半月大的女兒Shannon。你有再結婚嗎？請代問候你的姊妹。
近來我組織了一間製片公司，且寫了一本"Silent Flute"故事，由James Coburn和我主演，Stirling Silliphant編劇，他是金像名作家 In the Heart of the night，我們預備作第一次荷李活武俠片很有成期望，大約六月左右開鏡，所有合作的均是從我學習的，將來Steve Mc Queen可能又有合作，我對於這籌劃萬二分興奮。
至於武道方面，我仍然是日日修習，與一班徒弟和朋友每星期兩次，無所謂是西洋拳，跆拳道或摔角，派別是無所謂，只要和和氣氣不要反面矣。自從66年開始認真去練習後，覺得以前的偏見是錯了，因此改叫我的心得練出的為截拳道，截拳道衹是名稱矣，至緊要還是不要去局部偏見而練，當然我是日日練走，修習工具，日日要提高基本條件。拳理雖是要緊，現實的還是重要，兩者雖需要。我是感謝你和師父在港時多多指導我詠春門徑，其實是多得你使我多去走現實路，由其是在美國的西洋拳家，我也多和他們練，很多所謂"詠春名家", 我希望他們不要自作勇為去和他們打!
我可能會回港一行，希望你還是住舊址，知交朋友我們要多敘首，談談往事，真是何不樂為？見到葉師父請代問候。
祝
愉快
BruceLee
於1970年1月11日

(English translation)
Dear Shun-leung, 11 January 1970

It has been a long time since I last wrote to you. How are you? Alan Shaw's letter from Canada asks me to lend you my 8mm film. I am sorry about that. It is because I have lost it when I moved my home. That film is already very old and I seldom use it, so I have lost it. I am sorry for it. Now I have bought a house in Bel-Air. It is about half an acre. There are many trees. It has the taste of a range. It is located on a hill top near Beverly Hills. Moreover, besides my son Brandon, I have had a daughter, Shannon, who is seven months old now. Have you re-married ? Please send my regards to your sisters. Recently, I have organised a film production company. I have also written a story "The Silent Flute". James Coburn and I will act in it. Stirling Silliphant is the screen-play writer. He is a famous screen-play writer (In the Heat of the Night). We plan to make the first fighting film in Hollywood. The prospect is good. About six months later, the filming work will begin. All who participate in this film are my followers. In the future, Steve McQueen may also work together with me.

I am very excited about this plan. As to martial arts, I still practice daily. I meet my students and friends twice a week. No matter they are western boxer, Taekwondo learner or wrestler, I will meet them as long as they are friendly and will not get angry. Since I started to practice realistically in 1966 (Protectors, gloves, etc.), I feel that I had many prejudices before, and they are wrong. So I change the name of the gist of my study to Jeet-kune-do. Jeet-kune-do is only a name. The most important thing is to avoid having bias in the training. Of course, I run everyday, I practice my instruments (punch, kick, throw, etc.). I have to improve my fundamentals daily. Although the principle of boxing is important, practicality is even more important. I thank you and Master for teaching me the ways of Wing Chun in Hong Kong. Actually, I have to thank you for leading me to walk on a practical road. Especially in the States, there are western boxers, I often practise with them too. There are many so-called masters in Wing Chun here, I really hope that they will not be so arrogant as to fight with those western boxers.

I may make a trip to Hong Kong. I hope that you will live in the same place. We are intimate friends, we need to meet more and chat about our past days. That will be a lot of fun? When you see Master Yip, please send my regard to him. Happiness be with you!

— Bruce Lee, 1970

== Official recognition by China in 1996 as Science of Ving Tsun Kung Fu ==
In October 1996, National Sports Administration of China invited Wong Shun-leung (together with 12 students) to Beijing to teach and to promote Wong's Ving Tsun to the Chinese peoples, the seminar turn out very successful with nearly 200 registered participants and among them were martial arts experts, enthusiast, police and army individuals. After the weeklong training with Wong and Wong's students, both organizer and participants unanimously acknowledged that Wong's Ving Tsun is not just an ordinary fighting skill but something deep, significant and highly effective, since then Wong's fighting system became known as 咏春拳学 in Chinese, Ving Tsun Kuen Hok in Cantonese of Hong Kong and Science of Ving Tsun Kung Fu in English, today WSLVT (Wong Shun Leung Ving Tsun) is widespread in mainland China and worldwide.

== Fighting career ==
=== Beimo (比武) competition ===
According to Wong and his students, he became active in beimo (比武): semi-organized bare-knuckle challenge fights in Hong Kong (sometimes known as 'kung fu elimination contests'). Supposedly there were no rules, protective equipment, or time limits. As Wong recalled in an interview, "When I competed, it was in secret. We went into a room, and the door was shut and there were no rules. The government did not allow them. They were illegal, but we didn't care. We fought until the other guy was knocked out." Beimo competitions were believed to be held anywhere that was found to be convenient. Some beimo competitions were held on the streets in Hong Kong.

According to Yuen Yim-keung, there were three two-minute rounds with a one-minute rest in between. The ring was five meters in diameter, which was drawn in chalk, and as a result if the opponent went out of the ring more than three times he would be announced as the loser. There were also no attacks to the eyes, throat or groin, but everything else could be applied. Also if there was excessive blood loss, then the injured fighter would be announced as the loser.

In the early 1950s, compared to other kung fu styles, wing chun was hardly known. It was a style of kung fu practiced by a minority—mostly members of the Association of Restaurant Workers of Hong Kong. Different kung fu schools met secretly with each other for challenge matches. Wong was said to have faced opponents from many disciplines—"virtually every style of martial art in the colony." He defeated many opponents in beimo matches in Hong Kong between the ages of 17 and 32, and his reputation grew as he continued winning these matches. Some have attributed wing chun's fame in Hong Kong to Wong's beimo reputation.

Students from different schools sometimes visited each other's schools and issued challenge to their top students and instructors. If a student was able to beat the main teacher or master of a particular school, the school would close down. According to some of Yip's first-generation students, Wong "reputedly 'closed down' quite a number of schools in that way." Reportedly, Wong won most of these contests within a few punches. Wong's prowess in beimo helped him convince his secondary school classmate, Wu Chan-nam, to become his first student—Wu witnessed his win in a beimo match. In addition, he encouraged his junior fellow students and his own students to compete in beimo competitions and arranged matches for them. According to Yuen Yim-keung (袁炎強), Wong's student, Wong stopped arranging these matches because "his students were defeating not only other Kung Fu styles but also other students of Ving Tsun outside of the Wong Shun-leung family." Wong also reportedly had a beimo match with a much bigger Russian boxer called Giko. John Smith (a student of one of Wong's students), reports that Wong defeated Giko, and that Wong himself told Smith how he was able to achieve this victory.

Wong was believed to have had over 60, and perhaps over 100, beimo matches and never lost. This reputation earned him the name 'Gong Sau Wong' (i.e., 'King of Talking Hands'). Once asked if he was the best fighter in the world, he replied, "No, only the second best"; when then asked who was the best, he said, "I have not met him yet."

=== Retirement from beimo competition ===
In what was to be Wong's last beimo match, he unintentionally blinded his opponent's eye; he then decided to quit beimo fighting. Lee Hang-cheong (李恆昌), one of Wong's students, recalled that Wong had insulted his intended opponent (apparently a well-known kung fu instructor) to coerce him to fight, but regretted both instigating the fight and accidentally blinding the other man in one eye. There is a discrepancy between Lee's account and others about Wong's age when he retired from beimo competition. A few sources claim that Wong competed in beimo until the age of 32. Lee, however, said that Wong was around the age of 24.

Another view is that Wong's last beimo match was actually a different kind of incident. In beimo competition, according to Yuen Yim-keung, "There were also no attacks to the eyes, throat or groin, but everything else could be applied." Yuen also said that there were three two-minute rounds in a beimo match. In contrast, others have said that there were no rules and no time limits. Moreover, some question whether or not a referee was present. When Wu Chan Nam fought in a beimo match, there was a referee present—Wong Kiu. According to Life and Legend of Bruce Lee, there was always supposed to be a referee present at a beimo match, as Wong re-enacted the scene of a 1950s beimo match on a rooftop and played the role of the referee.

=== Other competitions ===
On 22 November 1957, the inaugural Taiwan–Hong Kong–Macau Open Chinese Kung Fu Competition (台港澳國術比賽) was held in Taiwan. Thirty-two competitors from Hong Kong and Macau formed a team and participated in this competition, but only two Hong Kong competitors scored a victory. Wong competed in his weight class and had a preliminary match with Wu Ming Jeet (吳明哲), a Taiwanese fighter known for his powerful kicks, but was knocked out and eliminated. A documentary film covering the competition was played in Hong Kong, with a first-day showing on 12 February 1958. In 1974, Unicorn Chan (小麒麟) recalled that it was in 1958 when Bruce Lee took him to watch a documentary film on kung fu competitions, and that Lee had watched it seven times before within the last four days.

Wong once defeated a fencing champion on television with his wing chun butterfly knives. Gary Lam recounted that "several years ago my Sifu, the late Wong Shun-leung, sparred with a champion western fencer on television. Wong easily beat the fencer, and when the fencer complained Wong had an unfair advantage with two swords, Wong offered him a second blade and beat him again."

Wan Kam-leung (溫鑑良) witnessed the fight Wong fought with Bruce Lee when Lee returned to Hong Kong from the United States. It took place at Lee's home in Kowloon Tong. Wong claimed that his hands were faster acting than Lee's, however Bruce retaliated by saying his kicks were much faster, thus provoking the friendly scuffle. Wan commented that Lee's kicks were fast and powerful whilst Wong's wing chun hand techniques were modified and practical. Wong and Lee only fought for a short period of time.

== Ip Man Kwoon's new Jeung-Mun-Yan ==
1970s Kung fu magazine 17th issue "Who succeed the Jeung-Mun-Yan of Wing Chun" (Chinese: 香港《當代武壇》第17期《誰繼承詠春掌門之位》) published in Hong Kong, in December 1972 after Grandmaster Ip Man died, students of Yip found themselves without a leader, Ip Chun, Leung Sheung, Lok Yiu, Chu Shong-tin, Jiu Wan, Wong Shun-leung, Tang Sang and Bruce Lee among the candidates to succeed Yip, after 6 months of debates, Ip Chun and students of Yip officially appointed Wong as the new Jeung-Mun-Yan (president) of Wing Chun (Chinese: 香港咏春体育会主席).

== Filmography ==
=== Enter the Dragon ===
Some sources claim that Wong choreographed some fight scenes in Enter the Dragon (龍爭虎鬥), saying that "... when shooting Enter the Dragon in Hong Kong, he [Bruce Lee] invited Wong to come on location to discuss the fight scenes" and that "Wong in fact had been invited to choreograph some of the fight scenes in Enter the Dragon." The documentary Dragon since 1973 consists of interviews with various Hong Kong personalities, mostly those who worked with Lee in his Golden Harvest days. None of the interviewees, including Bee Chan (陳會毅; one of Lee's most trusted assistants), Shek Kin (石堅), and Chaplin Chang (張欽鵬), mentioned that Wong had been invited to work as a fight scene choreographer for Enter the Dragon.

A photograph of Wong, Lee, and Raymond Chow (鄒文懐) on one of the sets of Enter the Dragon (the weapon room) implies that Wong was present during filming. Wong appears in the same clothing in that photograph as he wears in the footage of himself sparring with an extra on that particular set, and thus could have been from the time when Wong attended a screen test for Game of Death, as described below.

=== Game of Death ===
Wong received an invitation to appear in Game of Death (死亡遊戲), but declined. He was scheduled to attend a screen test on the set of Enter the Dragon after Bruce Lee had finished shooting the film and was working on dubbing. Lee returned to Hong Kong from his last trip to the United States of America in late May 1973. Thus, Wong would have attended the screen test sometime in June 1973. Wong recalled, "About two months before he (Bruce Lee) died he gave me a phone call ... After this he left Hong Kong to settle his film business. When he came back, he called me up and wanted me to participate in the making of Game of Death. He had also invited me to the studio to attend a screen test. I did not promise to act in the film, yet I still went to attend the screen test to please him." In a 1986 interview, Wong said, "I told him (Bruce Lee) that I didn't want to go and die in my first movie! ... I wasn't in dire financial straits at the time, so I didn't have to do the film (just) to make money." The role of Lee's final opponent was thus played by basketball star Kareem Abdul-Jabbar. In another interview, Wong said, "It was for Game of Death, but I declined because I thought that the moves of Wing Chun style wouldn’t look good on film. I think the Wing Chun method is ugly for movies but very good and very logical for real fighting."

=== Later film work ===
In 1973, shortly after Bruce Lee's death, Wong acted in Life and Legend of Bruce Lee. In this Chinese film, Wong played the role of himself, an instructor at Ip Man's wing chun school who first met a teenager named Lee in the 1950s. In the 1993 documentary film Death by Misadventure, Wong talked about his experiences with Lee. He also starred in a training video, entitled Wing Chun: the Science of In-fighting, which was produced in the early 1980s.

== Secret matches ==
Wu and Wong's match in the 1957 kung fu competition in Taiwan is the only documented proof of Wong's involvement in fighting competition; the only records of Wong's beimo matches are from eyewitnesses. Since beimo competition was held secretly, the loser often denied involvement in the fight afterward, or both sides would claim victory after the fight. For example, in the match between Ni Yuk Tong (倪沃棠) and Wong, various accounts of the fight exist, and no one is sure of where the fight took place, how the fighters performed, and who won. Thus, while many of Wong's students have referred to him as "one of the greatest fighters of this century" (i.e., the 20th century), those outside the Wing Chun community could doubt the claim's authenticity.

Wong's participation in, and views on, tournaments reflected his philosophy on martial arts. When asked, "Did you compete in any organized tournaments with rules?" Wong replied, "Not in boxing. When I competed, it was in secret. We went into a room, and the door was shut and there were no rules. The government did not allow them. They were illegal, but we didn't care. We fought until the other guy was knocked out." When asked, "Did you ever consider competing in combat sports?" Wong replied, "I have always liked boxing, I like anything about fighting, but my kind of fighting is not the sport version, it is real fighting where there are no rules."

== Students of WSL ==
Students of Wong Shun-leung include:

- Anthony Kan
- Attilio Reale: practiced Ving Tsun with Wong Shun-leung for 16 years; played the Ving Tsun Fighter in Bloodsport with Jean-Claude Van Damme; teaches advanced students in Munich, Germany
- Barry Lee
- Bruce Lee
- Bruce Le
- Chan Kim-man (陳儉文): one of the senior students who practiced and taught Ving Tsun with Wong Shun-leung since 1978 for 19 years until Wong died in 1997
- Chiu Hok-yin
- Christoph Aeberhard
- Cliff Au Yeung
- Clive Potter
- David Cheung
- Ernest Hoefler
- Gary Lam (Lam Man-hog)
- Jerry Yeung
- Keo Chan (FR)
- Ko Kin
- Lam Kam-kuen
- Lawrence Leung Chee-sing
- Lewis Luk
- Li Hang-cheong
- Mariusz Cydzik
- Ng Chun-hong
- Nino Bernardo
- Noblot Jean-Marc (FR)
- Janusz Szymankiewicz
- Philipp Bayer
- Philip Ng
- Reto Cuorad
- Rick Cantrell
- Rolf Clausnitzer
- Tommy Yuen Yim-keung
- Tony Lee
- Victor Koo
- Wan Kam-leung
- Steven Girard (UK)
- Lakis Philippou (Cyprus/UK)
- Wong Hong-chung (son of Wong Shun-leung)

== Death ==
On 12 January 1997, Wong had been playing few games of cards and Mahjong with a group of friends at the Ving Tsun Athletic Association, when he complained of feeling unwell. Soon afterwards he suffered a stroke, collapsed and went into a coma. Wong died on 28 January 1997 at the age of 61 years old.

== In popular culture ==
He was portrayed by Chapman To in the 1999 film What You Gonna Do, Sai Fung? (a.k.a. 1959 某日某).

He was portrayed by Eric Chen in the 2008 Chinese drama The Legend of Bruce Lee.

He was portrayed by Huang Xiaoming in the 2010 film Ip Man 2.

He was portrayed by Wu Yue in the 2010 film Bruce Lee, My Brother.

== Notes ==
- a. Wong's date of birth is given as 8 May 1935 by Philipp Bayer (one of his students) and Roy Horan (in an article for Black Belt magazine in 1983),. Other sources give his date of birth as 8 June 1935. The discrepancy is attributed to Wong's date of birth under the lunar calendar, i.e., the 8th day of the 5th lunar month.
