= Red Boat Opera Company =

Opera cohort that developed Wing Chun Kung Fu

The Red Boat Opera Company (Chinese: 紅船) was a group of traveling Cantonese opera singers who toured China in the late 1800s and early 1900s.

Cantonese opera was popularized in the 18th century, primarily by the Red Boat Troupes who traveled the Pearl River Delta during the late Qing dynasty until World War 2. The Red Boats carried performers throughout the Guangzhou region and served as sleeping quarters and training grounds for the legendary kung fu style of Wing Chun. It is said that the actors originally used a purple cave boat as a theater boat, and later added sails to paint dragon scales and chrysanthemums on the hull. In this pattern, the bow is painted red, so it is called the red boat. They were used to carry members of theatrical troupes and theater boxes, and also served as places for boarding and lodging of theatrical troupe members. Such troupes are called Red Boat troupes.

Some of the earliest practitioners of Cantonese opera were members of the Red Boat Troupes in Guangzhou, China. These performers traveled down the Pearl River Delta to put on shows in small towns in villages around central China. This art form was later threatened by tensions in East Asia during the Second Sino-Japanese War. The politics surrounding this war was a major influence on the economic, political, and social structure of the Red Boat Troupes.

The term “Cantonese Opera” was not coined until 1925, and prior to that distinction, Cantonese Opera was simply called Red Boat Opera, and the performers called workers of hung sun, or red boat. The contemporary form of Cantonese opera was brought to the Guangzhou region by Master Zhang Wu, a talented performer with anti-dynastic beliefs who fled to Foshan, considered to be the home of Cantonese opera, to avoid oppression by the Qing emperor. Through their characters, Cantonese Opera performers were able to voice their dissatisfaction with the social injustices under the Qing regime. Performers in the Red Boat Troupes often became targets of persecution because they were instrumental in leading insurgencies against the dynasty. One such performer was Lee Man Mau, who led troupes to fight Qing soldiers, dressed in opera costumes, using Wing Chun Kung Fu learned from their opera training. Lee and his followers were imprisoned, and opera was banned from 1855 to 1871. By 1880, the Red Boat Troupe numbers had risen significantly, and in 1911, members of the troupes were instrumental in bringing down the Qing dynasty. With the establishment of the Republic, the Red Boat Troupes flourished, entering into a golden age.

Red Boat troupes had been an important platform for Wing Chun to build on in Guangdong, and some of the most famous Red Boat Performers such as Leung Lan Kui, Leung Yee Tei, and Wong Wah-Bo were all grand masters of Guangdong Wing Chun

== Wing Chun ==
Kung Fu was integral to China's arts, philosophies, and discipline. Historians suggest that kung fu began with hunters’ necessity to defend themselves in the forest. The first recorded mention of kung fu was in the 5th century BCE in the Spring and Autumn Annals. It was developed as a fighting style and became a sport under the Qin dynasty. By the time of the Tang dynasty, kung fu had entered the arts in the form of poetry and literature. Many historians argue that kung fu actually began with the construction of the Shaolin Temple, when the fighting style was imbued with philosophy. The monks at the Shaolin Temple combined kung fu with elements of Buddhism in order to strengthen body and mind. This combination of mental and physical discipline became the backbone of kung fu and is still central to martial arts today. A period of civil war during the transition of the Ming and Qing dynasties caused many of the Shaolin Temple members to flee and take up refuge throughout southern China, resulting in the creation of Wing Chun.

Liang Shan (梁贊), one of the earliest recorded users of Wing Chun, studied martial arts with boxer Luo Xiong (羅雄) at the age of 15. Liang Shan joined Qiaonghua Hall with Liang Erdi (梁二娣) as teacher. Liang Shan later gained apprenticeship and joined the Tiandihui. Liang Shan learned Luóhàn fú hǔ quán (羅漢伏虎拳) from Liang Erdi. A few years later, Liang Erdi had to move to Guangzhou. Before leaving, Liang Erdi introduced Liang Shan to Huang Huabao (黃華寶), who would teach Liang Shan Wing Chun Kung Fu (詠春拳法).

Therefore, Wing Chun was originally one of the martial arts practiced by the Red Boat opera, also referred to as Hóng chuán yǒng chūn quán (紅船詠春拳 Eng. "Red Boat Wing Chun"). Later, in 1854 (fourth year of Xianfeng), Cantonese opera artist Li Wenmao of the Qionghua Guild Hall organized a triad in response to the Taiping Heavenly Kingdom and revolted in the Jingtang Ancient Temple in Foshan. The Qing government burned down the Qionghua Guild Hall, disbanded the artists, and banned Cantonese opera for 15 years. The Red Boat was extinct, and Wing Chun also disappeared in Cantonese opera. In 1870, the ban on Cantonese opera was lifted, and Liángzànshè (梁贊設) established a pharmacy in Kuaizi Street, named Rongshengtang. At the same time, Wing Chun was taught to the outside world. Since then, Wing Chun has been spread to the world step by step.

== Red Boats ==
The reasoning behind the iconic red coloring of the boats has long been debated, and there are several theories surrounding its origin. One is that red is simply the color of the Guangdong region and a symbol of blessings and prosperity. Another ties the color to the Taiping rebels and secret societies. The most likely, however, is the nature of red as a notable and unique color that would be recognizable to potential audiences. These boats were flat-bottomed vessels used to traverse the Pearl River Delta, carrying the opera companies and all their supplies from town to town along the river. A single ship housed over a hundred fifty passengers, including performers and crew. A single company often made use of two or even sometimes three boats.

The red boats served as both transportation and a home for the performers, and were organized with a strict social hierarchy, with 140-160 crew members in every troupe. The actors were given rooms, while the musicians and other crew members slept out on the deck. The boats in their early years always traveled in pairs, called the tin teng, or sky boat, and the dei tan, or earth boat. In later years, a third boat called the waa teng, or picture boat, carried the scenery, props, and costumes. “The tin teng (sky boat) accommodated the managers, the dans (female role), the shengs (lead male characters), the chous (the clowns), the instrumentalists and some other members of the staff. The dei teng (earth boat) accommodated the wu shengs (kung fu and acrobatic characters) and other members”. Aboard the boats, there was strict protocol and division of labor that was standardized among the troupes.

The Red Boat Opera Troupes traversed the Pearl River, performing at different temple festivals and rituals. The troupes were highly religious, and their performances often centered around the worship of a god. The wu sheng roles, or male warrior performers, would begin the show with prayer. The other roles in Cantonese opera included dans, which were female roles, sheng, which were male roles, jing, which were painted-face characters, and chou, which were clown characters. The performers had white-painted faces with exaggerated eyebrows and bright red lips. They wore elaborate beaded costumes complete with equally elaborate headdresses. The two types of shows performed were wu, which were martial arts shows, and man, which were meant to educate, and focused on elegance and scholarly themes. Red Boat performers were trained intensely in the Wing Chun style of kung fu with which they performed acrobatics onstage in wu shows.

The Red Boats operated at their peak until 1938, when the Japanese began their occupation on the eve of World War 2. Japanese restrictions on travel along the river halted the Red Boat troupes from touring. The same year, an air raid on the Foshan harbor destroyed most of the Red Boats. After the war, they were never rebuilt due to political and economic instability in the region. Instead, more-permanent theaters began popping up along the Pearl River banks, and troupes no longer needed to travel. The last known pair of Red Boats were spotted off the coast of Macau in 1951.

== Performers ==
Performers in the Red Boat Opera Companies often used their stage time to discuss their political and social beliefs. Most of the time they had a qualm with how the government was running; this was their way of making a change and speaking out. Performers usually came from lower-class families and had little-to-no education, so they were viewed very low on the social ladder. Not only that, but it is also rumored that criminals were aboard the boats as well, seeking refuge from the government. The boats acted as a safe haven for on-the-run convicts. The troupes felt related, and in a similar social situation, to the criminals who had very little and were already upset about the political climate and would not say anything to officials; thus, in exchange for silence, the wanted convicts would help out as extra hands on deck. "The red boats, which were used by opera troupes, were a favorite place for rebels and resistance fighters to hide. Because these sailed the coast from place to place, they were perfectly suited to organize the resistance fighters and pass secret messages from town to town, unnoticed by the watchful eyes of the authorities. The red boats had permission to move freely to the coastal resorts to entertain the population in which the performances of Chinese opera were very popular."

The performances themselves involved singing, acting, musical instruments, martial arts, and acrobatics. Martial arts played a big role in the development of Cantonese Opera. Performers learned the Wing Chun form of martial arts and would include their skills in their performances. The rebels that would stow away were also professionally trained in martial arts and so would teach the performers even more. On the back of the boats there were usually a pole of some kind that would be used for training purposes.

During their performances, the troupes would wear big, elegant costumes that were very brightly colored. They would wear red lipstick, exaggerated eyebrows, big eyeliner, and red around their eyes and cheeks; this would also highlight their nose. If there were a lot of performers in a troupe, sometimes a whole boat would be used to transport their costumes.
