= Real Kung Fu =

Hong Kong television series

- Poster
- Genre: Historical, martial arts
- Starring: Yuen Biao; Bryan Leung; Gordon Liu; Yuen Wah
- Opening theme: Mou Si Dou (武是道) performed by Alan Tam
- Country of origin: Hong Kong
- Original languages: Cantonese; Hokkien (dubbed)
- No. of episodes: 20

Production
- Producer: Chong Wai-kin
- Running time: 45 minutes

Original release
- Network: TVB
- Release: October 24 – November 18, 2005

Real Kung Fu
- Traditional Chinese: 佛山贊師父
- Simplified Chinese: 佛山赞师父
- Literal meaning: Master Tsan of Foshan
Transcriptions
Yue: Cantonese
- Jyutping: Fat6 Saan1 Zaan3 Si1 Fu2

Real Kung Fu is a Hong Kong television series first broadcast on TVB in October 2005. The series is shown to celebrate TVB's 38th anniversary. It aired every weeknight at 10:05 to 11:05 pm (Hong Kong Time).

== Cast ==
Note: Some of the characters' names are in Cantonese romanisation.

Cast	Role	Description
Yuen Biao	Leung Tsan 梁贊	Chef/Wing Chun master Cheung Kin-hei's boyfriend.
Maggie Shiu	Cheung Kin-hei 張見喜	Doctor; Leung Tsan's girlfriend.
Bryan Leung	Leung Yee-tai 梁二娣	
Yuen Wah	Wong Wah-bo 黃華寶	Leung Tsan's master.
Gordon Liu	Lin Yung 連勇	
Derek Kok	Ching Kwong 正光	
Selena Li	Ho Yuet 皓月	Chung Chi-chung's friend.
Timmy Hung	Chan Wah-shun 陳華順	Leung Tsan's apprentice.
Charmaine Li	Tse Ping-yee 謝蘋兒	
Jack Wu	Siu Fu-yung 小芙蓉	Leung Yee-tai's apprentice.

== Viewership ratings ==
	Week	Episode	Average Points	Peaking Points	References
1	October 24–28, 2005	1 — 5	24	—	
2	October 31 - November 4, 2005	6 — 10	25	—	
3	November 7–11, 2005	11 — 15	26	—	
4	November 14–18, 2005	16 — 20	26	—	
