= Wong Wah-bo =

Martial artist and opera singer

- Born: unknown Heshan, Guangdong, Qing Empire
- Died: unknown Qing Empire
- Native name: 黃華寶
- Style: Wing Chun
- Teachers: Leung Lan-kwai; Leung Yee-tai

Other information
- Occupation: Martial artist, Opera singer
- Notable students: Yuen Chai-wan; Yuen Kay-shan; Leung Jan; Leung Bik

Chinese name
- Traditional Chinese: 黃華寶
- Simplified Chinese: 黄华宝
Transcriptions
Standard Mandarin
- Hanyu Pinyin: Huáng Huábǎo

Wong Wah-bo was a martial artist and an opera singer of the late Qing Dynasty. Wong Wah-bo is a notable figure in development of martial art Wing Chun, which is known for its poorly documented history, and is recognized as being part of various contemporary Wing Chun lineages' history.

== Background ==
Not much was known about his childhood life except that he was born in Heshan, Guangdong, Qing Empire during the late Jiaqing period of the Qing Dynasty.

From the Daoguang to Xianfeng period, Wong made a living as an opera singer of the Red Boat Opera Company, often played as Guan Yu, and was first trained by Leung Lan-kwai (梁蘭桂) in an unnamed martial arts boxing skill and later with Leung Yee-tai (梁二娣) in exchange for his Six-and-a-Half Point Pole skill.

He retired at the age of 60 and moved to Qingyun Street, Kuai Zi, Foshan. At Foshan he trained his students, whom included Leung Jan, whom he was introduced by Yee-tai. Due to both of them were from Gulao (古勞) Village, Wong taught Leung the whole of the skill set. Leung was noble and his skills were exquisite, he was deeply respected by other martial artists and was known as Mr. Jan of Foshan (佛山贊先生).

When Leung Jan later became an official, this martial arts skill was officially known as Wing Chun, which he was later known as the King of Wing Chun Kuen (詠春拳王).

== In popular culture ==
In the 1981 TVB television drama series Kung Fu Master of Fat Shan, he was portrayed by Chang Yu.

In the 1981 film The Prodigal Son, he was portrayed by Sammo Hung.

In the 2005 TVB television drama series Real Kung Fu, he was portrayed by Yuen Wah.

In the 2006 TVB television drama series Wing Chun, he was portrayed by Sammo Hung.

== Bibliography ==
- Chu, Robert; Ritchie, Rene; Wu, Y. (2015). The Definitive Guide to Wing Chun's History and Tradition. Tuttle Publishing. ISBN 978-1-4629-1753-2.
