= Sum Nung =

Chinese doctor and Grandmaster of Wing Chun Kung Fu

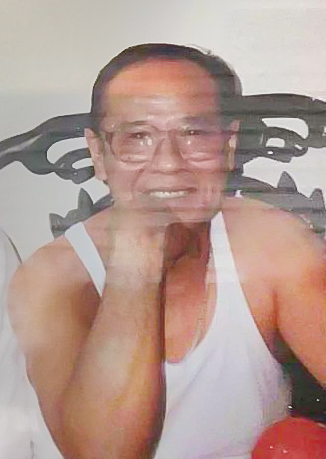
- Born: Sum Nung; 1926; Lima, Peru
- Died: 3 November 2002 (aged 75–76); Foshan, China
- Other names: 岑能, Shum Lung.
- Style: Wing Chun
- Teachers: Yuen Kay Shan; Chung Bo
- Rank: Grandmaster

Other information

Sum Nung or Cen Neng (岑能) was a Peruvian-Chinese martial artist. He is considered the father of Guangzhou Wing Chun and was the only disciple of Grandmaster Yuen Kay Shan. Undefeated in his life time, Sum Nung survived many battles, attacks and challenge matches. His ability to execute his skills with such precision and power made him known as "iron arm Nung".

== Early years ==
Sum Nung was born in Peru in 1926. He was of a Chinese father and a Peruvian mother. When he was about 7 years of age, he traveled to China with the father to visit his grandmother. During his visit, Japan attacked China during the Second World War. The Japanese bombarded their house and his father died, he was then left alone with his grandmother. Communication between the outside as well as within China was terminated. Master Sum lost contact with his mother and his life in Peru, to live poorly as many during the war. When he was about 12 years of age, he found work as an apprentice in the restaurant "Sky and Sea'' in the state of Foshan. He often had a hard time in his youth since he was often beaten up and humiliated because he was half Chinese and half Peruvian.

== Career as a martial artist ==
The chef of the restaurant called Cheung Bo was a master of Wing Chun Kung Fu and began teaching him how to defend himself against his assailants. In 1941, the famous Yuen Kay Shan owner of great properties in that state and winner of many death fights/combats, was introduced to Sum Nung. Looking at the master's slim and low physique, Sum doubted his talent and responded that he had nothing to learn from him. Yuen Kay Shan demonstrated and defeated him easily, another version was that Yuen placed a raw egg in each of his 2 pockets and challenged Sum to break an egg while he stood in the middle of a circle on the ground, Sum could not break an egg or even push Yuen out of the circle after this Sum was convinced that he could learn a lot from him and became his disciple. Sum Nung developed a great reputation toward the quality of his Kung Fu, he often had to fight to defend himself against the discrimination for being a foreigner. In 1943 he began teaching in Foshan in the village's deep temple to early students like his uncle Sum Jee. In the late 1940s, he moved to the city of Guangzhou, where he taught Wing Chun to members of several local trade unions. As the teacher of a union, his responsibility was not only teaching but leading them into group combat with other trade unions in territory disputes. Sum Nung had many scars from the knives and swords of his promptly defeated adversaries. At Yuen Kay San's requests (to value his life), the following year he opened a natural (herbal) or traditional medicine clinic and was a Chinese doctor at Daisun Street.

== Philosophy ==
Grandmaster Sum Nung emphasized greatly the importance of foundation or fundamental skills. He would not teach students advanced practices until prerequisite skills were mastered. He had only a handful of disciples, but his focus on rigorous and thorough basic practice produces high caliber practitioners. When selecting students, he prioritized good character over natural talent which was one of many conservative Chinese beliefs he demonstrated in life.

== In popular culture ==
The 2016 film Ip Man 3 martial arts film directed by Wilson Yip, and produced by Raymond Wong Pak-ming, which was the third in the series of films based on the life of Ip Man, Grandmaster of Wing Chun, with Donnie Yen in the lead role, also featuring Mike Tyson and Bruce Lee, one of Ip's students, played by Danny Chan Kwok-kwan.

The actor Zhang Jin was cast in the supposed role of Sum Nung, who was also an expert in Wing Chun and an able opponent of Ip Man in complex battles. However, due to Sum Nung being a disciple of Yuen Kay Shan, the name Sum Nung was changed to Cheung Tin-chi to avoid conflicts with Yuen Kay Shan's lineage and descendants, which was previously erupted in a controversy of Yuen Kay Shan being shown at a lower level than Ip Man in the 2010 film The Legend Is Born: Ip Man. In the end resulting to an official tea serving apology from Ip Chun to the Yuen family.
