= Yuen Chai-wan =

WW2 General and Grandmaster of Wing Chun Kung Fu

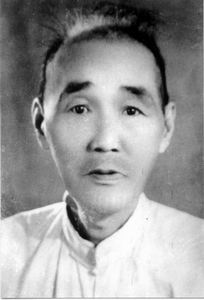
- Born: 1877; Guangdong, China
- Died: 1959 (aged 81–82); Saigon, Vietnam
- Other names: Nguyen Te-cong
- Style: Wing Chun
- Teachers: Fok Bo-chuen (霍保全); Fung Siu-ching (馮少青); Wong Wah-bo "Dai Fa Min" Kam
- Rank: Grandmaster

Other information
- Occupation: World War II General; Martial artist
- Notable relatives: Yuen Kay-shan (Brother)
- Notable students: Tran Thuc Tien

Chinese name
- Traditional Chinese: 阮濟雲
Transcriptions
Standard Mandarin
- Hanyu Pinyin: Ruǎn Jìyún
Yue: Cantonese
- Yale Romanization: Yún Jai-wàhn

Vietnamese name
- Vietnamese alphabet: Nguyễn Tế Công
- Chữ Hán: 阮濟公

Senior General Yuen Chai-wan

Military service
- Years of service: 1906–1945
- Rank: Senior General
- Battles/wars: Xinhai Revolution; Chinese Civil War; Second Sino-Japanese War

Yuen Chai-wan (simplified Chinese: 阮濟云; traditional Chinese: 阮濟雲; Cantonese Yale: Yún Jai-wàhn; pinyin: Ruǎn Jìyún) was a Grandmaster of Wing Chun and a general during the Second Sino-Japanese War. He was the son of the wealthy firework monopoly owner Yuen Chong Ming and older brother to Yuen Kay-shan, Yuen left China early 1930s when he was invited to teach Wing Chun in Vietnam at the Nanhai and Shunde Expatriates Associations and moved to Hanoi, where he was known in Vietnamese as Nguyễn Tế Công. In 1954 he relocated to Saigon and there established a second school. Yuen was entrusted with the mission of being the Patriarch of Wing Chun in Vietnam.

== Early life ==
Yuen was born in 1877 in China, He studied with Fok Bo Chuen and other students. Yuen's father paid a small fortune to encourage the renowned Wing Chun master Fok Bo-Chuen to teach Yuen and his younger brother Yuen Kay-shan martial arts. Day by day, he grew up with martial arts skills. It should be noted however that there are contradictory statements from Yuen Chai wan himself and discrepancies in some of the dates and some of the stories claimed. In example "Yuen Chai Wan learned from his Sifu (Fok Bo Chuan ? ) in the mountains, in his childhood ( around 13-14-15 years old) stayed there more than 10 years. That is the story what Yuen told to the students in Vietnam, and it is mentioned by Sifu Luc Vien Khai in the newspaper in 1966 ( the name of Yuen Chai Wan’s teacher was not disclosed ). If this statement by Yuen himself was accurate then it would not be possible for Yuen Kay San to have learned at the same time, from the same teacher, for Yuen Kay San who has 12 -14 younger than his brother( YCW was borne 1875 or 1877)would mean that Yuen kay san learned Kungfu at 1 year old? It should further be noted that Some people Claim Yuen Chai Wan learned from Fung Siu Ching invited by the father (who would have been more than 90 years old, if he was still alive) in 1933. Yuen Chai Wan would have been 56 years old and has been placed by some sources as having moved to Annam circa 1929 or 1930. In addition according to the older branches of the lines of Fung Siu Ching, he was not known to have taught any of the forms later claimed to his disciples, and was reputed to have retired in his old age to his home village around the time Tang Suen took over teaching. This was reputedly at the time of Tang Yik's Birth (which would have been 1911) with Fung reputedly dying in 1920). When Yuen was completely mature and reached a high level of martial arts, he participated in the fight against foreign invaders and the Qing dynasty.

== Healing practice ==
Few people know that the main reason Yuen's disciple Tran Thuc Tien came to the internal practice of Wing Chun as a cure for tuberculosis. Before coming to Wing Chun, Tran practiced many other martial arts but after a period of practice, he became unhealthy and got tuberculosis. According to doctors at the National Tuberculosis and Lung Disease Hospital, his disease was in stage 3, coughing up blood, and pleural effusion. At that time, Yuen opened a traditional medicine shop on Hang Buom street, but mainly taught martial arts. Seeing that Tran was seriously ill Yuen said to him: "I will cure you for the first time." Since then, Yuen dedicated himself to teaching him, thanks to the transmission energy training methods, upper inner qigong, combined with medical treatment, Tran gradually recovered from his illness and his Wing Chun healing methods became increasingly advanced. Not only did he cure his illnesses, but he was also the first disciple to be healed by Yuen's Gong practice. Tran in later years was able to duplicate Yuen's success of curing tuberculosis thanks to the teachings of Yuen.

== Military history ==
Yuen took part in the revolts 1906–1908, 1910, 1911. Since then, the reputation of his martial arts and military qualifications began to emerge. In October 1911, all the localities in South and Central China rose up for the Xinhai Revolution, and on February 12, 1912, the young king Pu Yi came out to show only to abolish the Qing dynasty. Ton Dat Tien took power and became president, then transferred power to Vien The Khai. Thus, at the age of 35, Vien The Khai becomes living evidence of the last era of the Manchu Court - the last emperor of China. After the Qing dynasty was abolished, Yuen continued to pursue the path of martial arts and participated in the resistance war against intervention by European countries and Japan, he worked secretly under the command of Chiang Kai-shek and witnessed many things. Yuen took part in the civil war from 1924 to 1927, witnessing hunger, sickness, and death of his friends, then the second Chinese Civil War in 1927–1936. During Second Sino-Japanese War Yuen became a General.

== Retirement ==
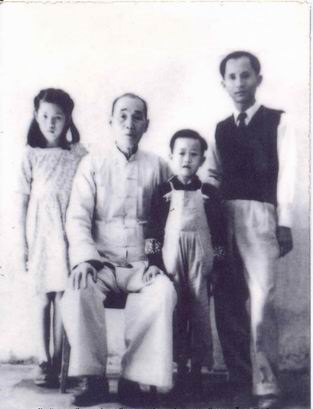
Yuen Chai-wan with his two children and Tran Thuc Tien.

By age 59, Yuen had become a very famous martial artist and never stopped exercising his body and spirit when he practiced Wing Chun. He also had very diligent disciples. At one time, Ip Man also studied with him; Yuen lived near Ip's family. When Ip's family was in trouble, Yuen's family would often help due to their very close relationship. Yuen was 16 years older Ip, both were seventh-generation students of Wing Chun, but Yuen was the first to learn martial arts so he was more advanced. Yuen and his brother Yuen Kay-shan were considered Grandmasters to Ip Man. Aged 59, Yuen decided to resign and live a peaceful life to focus on studying Wing Chun and teaching his students. The year 1936 was a year full of events and changes. When he resigned, his enemies and so-called "friends" began to defame and slander him in order to undermine his reputation. With the bravery and experience of the person who had worked in covert operations, he got rid of the "kind" people, then he changed his name to Nguyen Te-Cong and left China.

== Move to Vietnam ==
With the help of his disciples, in 1936 (some sources claim 1929-1930) Yuen left the country on a merchant boat and arrived at Hai Phong port, Vietnam there he changed his name to Nguyen Te-Cong who was a famous Buddhist saint. From his new residence, he kept up with events in China and expected a change, but the news he received from Yuyao, a disciple and a friend of his, was disappointing and he abandoned all hopes of returning to his homeland. That year he decided to come to Hanoi to settle permanently. After settling into a new life, At that time, there were many overseas Chinese who knew his reputation, many people knew him as a martial arts master of Wing Chun, a General and a good healer. Yuen and his disciple Chen Tai were invited to the mansion of a very prestigious elder named Dai Li-jai whose ancestors lived in Vietnam since 1805. After they talked, Dai Li-jai realized that Yuen was a man with a noble and mighty spirit, so he tried his best to persuade him to accept the teaching of Wing Chun for the Chinese to preserve culture and traditions of the homeland, because there are many prestigious families in the Chinese community that have kinship relations with the Vietnamese but there are many who are no longer consider to be Chinese, Yuen's relationship with the Vietnamese gradually becomes close and cordial. Chen Tai studies Wing Chun under Yuen while helping him gradually get used to his new life and integrate with the various classes of the population. In 1937, Chen Tai had to return to China to deal with a serious problem sent by his uncle in Shanghai to report. Yuen knew that he might not be able to meet his disciple again, so he taught Chen Tai martial arts and life experiences as his father taught him.

The local people increasingly came to love Yuen and considered him a good and experienced physician. When he interacted with the local people, he realized that they were kind and likable, so he began to accept new local disciples. In 1955 he moved to Ho Chi Minh City, to live in Cholon and continued to teach martial arts. Students loved and respect their teachers very much, and were always ready to help teachers in difficult times of life. Yuen considered Vietnam his second home and wholeheartedly taught Wing Chun to his disciples.

== Death and legacy ==
In April 1959, Yuen died at the age of 84, leaving in Vietnam a lot of knowledge about Wing Chun. His disciples have preserved and promoted this knowledge and spread it from generation to generation. Yuen has been revered by his disciples as the Grand Master of Vietnam's Wing Chun and his most famous Vietnamese disciples, are Tran Thuc Tien, Tran Van Phung, Ngo Si Quy and Vu Ba Quy. They went on to carry the legacy of Wing Chun in Vietnam.

Currently, the Wing Chun heritage of Grandmaster Yuen Chai Wan continues to be inherited and developed in Guangzhou, China. One of the prominent successors of this lineage is Sifu Chen Qingjun (陈庆君). He is currently the leader of the "Guangzhou Yuen Chai Wan Wing Chun Association".
