= The Prodigal Son (1981 film) =

1981 Hong Kong film by Sammo Hung

- Theatrical release poster
- Traditional Chinese: 敗家仔
- Simplified Chinese: 败家仔
- Hanyu Pinyin: Bài Jiā Zăi
- Jyutping: Baai6 Gaa1 Zai2
- Directed by: Sammo Hung
- Written by: Sammo Hung; Barry Wong
- Produced by: Raymond Chow
- Starring: Yuen Biao; Lam Ching-ying; Frankie Chan; Sammo Hung
- Cinematography: Ricky Lau
- Edited by: Cheung Yiu-chung
- Music by: Frankie Chan; Philip Chan Fei-lap
- Distributed by: Golden Harvest
- Release date: 22 December 1981
- Running time: 100 minutes
- Country: Hong Kong
- Language: Cantonese
- Box office: HK$9,150,729

The Prodigal Son (Chinese: 敗家仔) is a 1981 Hong Kong martial arts and semi-biographical film directed by Sammo Hung and co-written with Barry Wong. The film stars Yuen Biao, Lam Ching-ying, and Frankie Chan. The film was released on 22 December 1981 and grossed HK$9,150,729. The Prodigal Son was nominated for two Hong Kong Film Awards and won the award for Best Action Choreography.

The film is a fictional retelling of the life of Leung Jan, a practitioner of Wing Chun. In this movie, Leung Jan, or as he is called in the movie Leung Chang, is depicted as the son of a wealthy man who half-heartedly studies kung fu. Leung Chang's lack of expertise forces his father to pay people to lose to him in fights. After Leung Chang discovers that his father has been deceiving him, he becomes inspired to study martial arts more seriously and attempts to convince a kung fu expert to take him on as a student.

== Plot ==
Leung Chang is a young man in a wealthy family living in Foshan in the mid-19th century. He is a martial artist trained by two instructors in his father's employ. He has fought over three hundred times in Foshan and won every fight, but unbeknownst to him, his father has arranged for his servant Yee Tung-choi to bribe Chang's opponents to lose to him in order to protect him. This has caused Chang to believe that he is a world-class fighter, but in truth he hasn't even mastered the basics of kung fu and any real fighter could easily defeat him. Everyone knows this but him, giving him the nickname "The Prodigal Son" behind his back, because of the money he is costing his parents who pay to keep him from getting injured.

One night, three of Chang's friends attend a performance by the Lok Fung Lin Chinese Opera troupe. One of Chang's friends is attracted to the lead actress and asks her out on a date after the performance. She refuses, but he insists and even harasses her. She reveals herself to be a man, Leung Yee-tai, a master of Wing Chun. He beats up and humiliates Chang's friends. Chang challenges Yee-tai to a fight to avenge the insults to his friends. As usual, Yee Tung-choi tries to bribe Yee-tai to lose, but Yee-tai refuses, easily defeats Chang, and reveals the truth about his martial arts ineptitude to him.

Chang, desiring to learn real kung fu, asks Yee-tai to teach him Wing Chun. Yee-tai refuses because he thinks Chang would probably misuse it, but Chang has his father buy the Lok Fung Lin troupe and gives himself a job as Yee-tai's personal assistant, insisting on following Yee-tai everywhere until Yee-tai agrees to teach him Wing Chun. This continues for six months. The Lok Fung Lin troupe travels to Canton. There, Yee-tai's Wing Chun skills are witnessed by Lord Ngai Fei, the son of a Manchu duke and who is also a martial arts master, hunting for a worthy opponent.

One night, Ngai forces Yee-tai to fight him. Ngai and Yee-tai are evenly matched until Yee-tai has an asthma attack. Ngai stops the fight and postpones it until Yee-tai is healthy and fit for it. It is revealed that Ngai is also a "prodigal son"; unbeknownst to him, his father has ordered his bodyguards to protect him from anyone who might beat him in a fight. However, their methods are more ruthless and brutal than the bribery employed by Chang's parents; Ngai's father resorts to assassinating anyone who poses a threat to Ngai's credential as a martial arts master.

During the night, Ngai's bodyguards and a team of assassins infiltrate the Lok Fung Lin theater, massacre the troupe, and burn down the theater. Yee-tai is having trouble sleeping because of his asthma; as a result, he reacts in time to escape along with Chang, who distracted the assassins long enough to get Yee-tai escape from the assassins. The assassins think they died in the fire, as does everyone else. In reality, Yee-tai takes Chang to the home of his martial brother Wong Wah-bo. With Wah-bo's help, Chang finally convinces Yee-tai to teach him Wing Chun. Chang trains under both Yee-tai and Wah-bo; Yee-tai trains him in Wing Chun, while Wah-bo trains him in freestyle fighting.

Over time, Chang achieves proficiency in martial arts, but Yee-tai's asthma is worsening. Chang takes Yee-tai back to Foshan to see a doctor. There, Ngai learns that Yee-tai is still alive, and he happily visits him. Yee-tai reveals that Ngai's bodyguards have been assassinating everyone who might beat Ngai. The bodyguards murder Yee-tai. Horrified by the revelations, Ngai has his bodyguards executed and estranges himself from his family, lamenting that he may never find an opponent as worthy as Yee-tai. Chang challenges Ngai to a fight at the graveyard, despite his late master's dying pleas. Using everything that Yee-tai and Wah-bo taught him, he manages to beat Ngai despite his martial superiority. In his dying breath, Ngai loudly declares Chang the victor of the battle, though Chang dismisses Ngai's praise before leaving the battlefield.

== Cast ==
- Yuen Biao as Leung Chang, known as Leung Jan
- Lam Ching-ying as Leung Yee-tai
- Frankie Chan as Ngai Fei
- Sammo Hung as Wong Wah-bo
- Chan Lung as Yee Tung-choi
- Chung Fat as Mr. Law
- Dick Wei as Mr. Suen
- Wai Pak as Au Ru Kwai
- Chin Yuet-sang as Kung fu teacher
- Lee Hoi-sang as Kung fu teacher
- Wu Ma as Brick Man
- James Tien as Broken right arm fighter
- Cheung King-bo as Troupe manager
- Ho Wai-han as Twiggy
- Chan Yau-hau as Leung Chang's father
- Lin Jin as Leung Chang's mother
- Wang Hsieh as Duke
- Ding Yue as Magistrate
- Cheung Hei as Doctor

== Production ==
In The Prodigal Son, the depth and framing of the shots were a radical change from the two-dimensional approach to filming that had been used in Hong Kong at this point.

== Release and reception ==
The Prodigal Son was released in Hong Kong on 22 December 1981. The film grossed a total of HK$9,150,729 at the Hong Kong box office. In the Philippines, the film was released by Season Films Universal on 11 January 1989. The Prodigal Son was released on DVD by Image Entertainment on 15 June 1999. It was later released on DVD by 20th Century Fox in 2004.

At the 2nd Hong Kong Film Awards, Sammo Hung, Lam Ching-ying, Yuen Biao and Billy Chan won the award for Best Action Choreography for their work in The Prodigal Son. The Prodigal Son was nominated for the Best Film and Best Director (Hung) awards, but lost both awards to Ann Hui's Boat People. In 2012, Time Out placed The Prodigal Son at number 54 on their list of Top 100 Hong Kong films.

== See also ==
- List of Hong Kong films of 1981
- Sammo Hung filmography
- Yuen Biao filmography
