= Tran Thuc Tien =

Vietnamese Grandmaster of Wing Chun Kung Fu

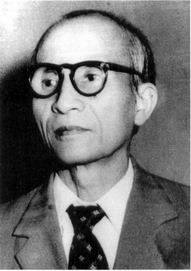
- Born: 1912; Guangdong, China
- Died: 1980 (aged 67–68); Ho Chi Minh City, Vietnam
- Native name: Trần Thúc Tiển
- Style: Wing Chun
- Teacher: Yuen Chai Wan
- Rank: Grandmaster

Other information
- Occupation: Martial artist Entrepreneur; Wine Maker
- Children: Trần Thiết Côn; Trần Lê Hoài Ngọc; Trần Lê Hoài Linh (Grandson)

Chinese name
- Traditional Chinese: 陳德聰
Transcriptions
Standard Mandarin
- Hanyu Pinyin: Chén Dé Cōng

Vietnamese name
- Vietnamese alphabet: Trần Thúc Tiển
- Chữ Hán: 陳德聰

Vietnam Internal style family Wing Chun
- The Vietnamese branch of Wing Chun
- Also known as: Việt Nam Vĩnh Xuân Nội Gia Quyền
- Focus: Internal energy
- Country of origin: Vietnam
- Creator: Tran Thuc Tien
- Famous practitioners: Tran Sinh (Tran Thiet Con); Tran Le Hoai Ngoc; Trần Lê Hoài Linh; Steven Chu
- Parenthood: Yuen Chai Wan; Lineage of Wing Chun

Tran Thuc Tien (Vietnamese: Trần Thúc Tiển) was a Grandmaster of Wing Chun, disciple of General Yuen Chai Wan, a Western educated wine maker and entrepreneur. The title of posthumous honor was awarded to Tran for Martial Arts by the leaders of the Hanoi Martial Arts Association,

== Early life ==
During the 1940s, In the afternoons, Tran had time to sit in front of the door of his house in a chair. At that time, the street was seemed always empty and the street was wide. Whilst sitting at the door, he often saw a tall, thin Chinese man in one hand carrying a basket with pillow cakes, chili sauce, vinegar, and the other hand holding a folding rack coming from the market.

One afternoon Tran saw two tall soldiers walking whom appearance drunk and walking the other way was that Chinese old man, as they got close to each other, by accident they got in each other's way, one of the soldiers looked annoyed then swung his fist, and punched the old man. Tran saw that the soldier had punched the old man in the chest, but strangely, the other soldier fell back about 2 meters, rolling to the sidewalk near the gutter. The second soldier saw his friend fall and thought he had been beaten by the old man so he punched the old man very hard, and again like his friend, the soldier who was thrown backwards even farther away than the other, rolling down a ditch. Meanwhile, the old Chinese man was still standing still. The two soldiers scrambled to walked away in embarrassment. Seeing that with his own eyes, Tran thought that this was an old Chinese man was great at martial arts.

After that he learn of the background and whereabouts of old Chinese man, Tran visited the place where old Chinese man lived to ask if he would teach what he knew and the old man whom turned out to be Yuen Chai Wan accepted Tran as his student .

== Martial arts accomplishments ==
The title of posthumous honor awarded for martial arts to Tran was awarded by the leaders of the Hanoi Martial Arts Association in 2016.

Speaking at the ceremony, the President of the World Federation of Vietnamese Traditional Martial Arts (WFVV) Hoang Vinh Giang assessed that Tran was a man who had made great contributions to the martial arts, who participated in defending the country as well as contributed the quintessence of traditional martial arts in Vietnam. Hoang Vinh Giang also said that Vietnam is one of the countries with strong traditional martial arts and a wide development in the world. Therefore, in the long run, the state should have rituals to honor the elites of Vietnamese traditional martial arts.

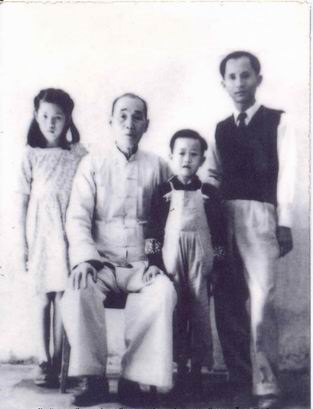
Yuen Chai Wan with his two children and Tran Thuc Tien.

In 1957, a boxer named Pham Xuan Nhan had just won the 57 kg class championship of the "Spring Boxing Championship". Tran being spoken about for a long time, Nhan has heard a rumor that Tran had a history of stage 3 tuberculosis and wanted to see if this had weekend him, Nhan then challenged Tran to a fight to which it was accepted. When Tran just raised his leg and stood "still", Nhan rushed in to strike, but never moved him. Following the 2nd attempt, Tran's slender body remained motionless and for the third time, Nhan ran from further back to gain momentum, thrusting his whole body with all of his strength but still could not shake the Tran's stance. The champion boxer was subjected to the inner workings of a small old man, weighing only 38 kg.

With Yuen Chai Wan, Tran went on to become the ancestor of the Vietnamese Vinh Xuan lineage and one of the martial arts masters who reached the ultimate level of inner strength, he taught many generations of students to develop the Vietnamese Wing Chun style. In the 60s of the 20th century, Tran also helped to train a number of police officers and soldiers of the Ministry of Public Security, as well as exchange and train commando soldiers of the Vietnam People's Army.

== Healing practice ==
Few people know that the main reason Tran came to the internal practice of Wing Chun as a cure for tuberculosis. Before coming to Wing Chun, Tran practiced many other martial arts but after a period of practice, he became unhealthy and got tuberculosis. According to doctors at the National Tuberculosis and Lung Disease Hospital, his disease was in stage 3, coughing up blood, and pleural effusion. At that time, Yuen Chai Wan opened a traditional medicine shop on Hang Buom street, but mainly taught martial arts. Seeing that Tran was seriously ill, Yuen said to him: "I will cure you for the first time." Since then, Yuen dedicated himself to teaching him, thanks to the transmission energy training methods, upper inner qigong, combined with medical treatment, Tran gradually recovered from his illness and his Wing Chun healing methods became increasingly advanced. Not only did he cure his illnesses, but he was also the first disciple to be healed by Yuen's Gong practice.

Yuen's act of saving a life through qigong was re-performed by Tran with doctor Nguyen Khac Vien. At that time, the institute's doctor was working at The Goi Publishing House, and he had just came from France after a long period of treatment but did not heal. After Hearing about Tran, he went to see him. Seeing that doctor Nguyen had severe tuberculosis, he went to Saint Hilaire du Touvet Hospital, went to the operating table 7 times, cut eight ribs, cut the entire right lung with 1/3 left. Seeing as the disease could be cured with Wing Chun's healing training, Tran gave Nguyen specific exercises, practiced qigong, impacted internal organs so that all parts of the body could regulate yin and yang to works smoothly. And doctor Nguyen had a full recovery in 1943, thanks to high energy in practicing qigong. After that, Nguyen studied in-depth the methods of practicing healing and promoted it to many people through his series of experiences that were published in books. In 1977, Nguyen decided to make a documentary film about this life-changing healing practice method.

== Death and legacy ==
Tran died in 1980.
