= Wan Kam-leung =

Chinese martial artist

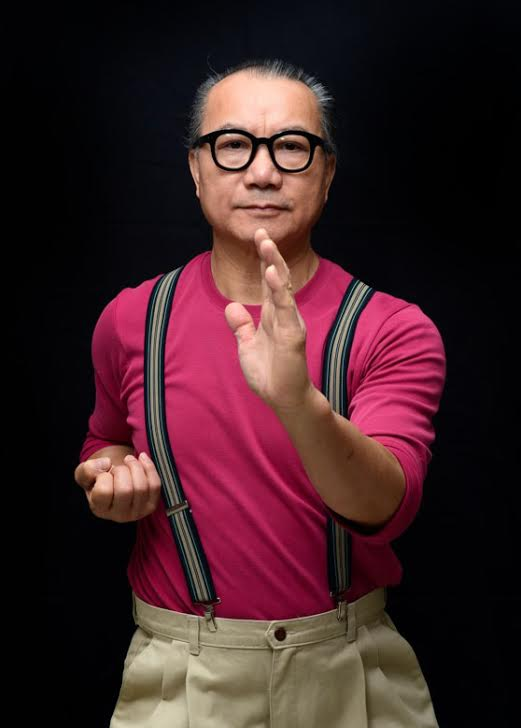
- Wan Kamleung
- Born: 1945 (age 79–80); Po On, Guangdong
- Style: Practical Wing Chun
- Teacher: Wong Shun-leung
- Rank: Grandmaster

Other information
- Notable students: William Kwok, Wong Pui-yee, Jack Leung, Danny Kong, Danny CCK, Kleber Battaglia, Martin Brogaard, Benno Wai

Wan Kam-leung (Chinese: 溫鑑良; Jyutping: Wan1 Gaam3-loeng4; born 1945) is a Chinese martial artist and qigong practitioner who developed and currently teaches Practical Wing Chun in Kowloon, Hong Kong. Wan studied Wing Chun kung fu under Wong Shun-leung

== Early life and introduction to Wing Chun ==
As a teen, Wan studied a variety of styles of kung fu as well as other styles of martial arts. Wan emigrated from mainland China to Hong Kong in 1959. There, his brother introduced him to Wing Chun kung fu. His first Wing Chun teacher was Leung Sheung, known to be the most senior student of Ip Man. He studied with Leung for seven months.

In 1962, another Wing Chun practitioner named Wong Shun-leung - another student of Yip Man - was opening a school across the street from Wan's home in Kowloon. Wan went to inquire about training with Wong, who told him to return later when the school was ready to open. Wan, who had learned of Wong and appreciated his philosophy and approach to kung fu, came back when the school opened and became Wong's first official student. After three months, Wong waived tuition for Wan due to his diligence and dedication to the school. Wan became Wong's close student and training partner. He continued to train closely with Wong for twenty years. Wan would witness Bruce Lee and Wong Shun-leung spar before Lee left to United States.

== Wing Chun career ==
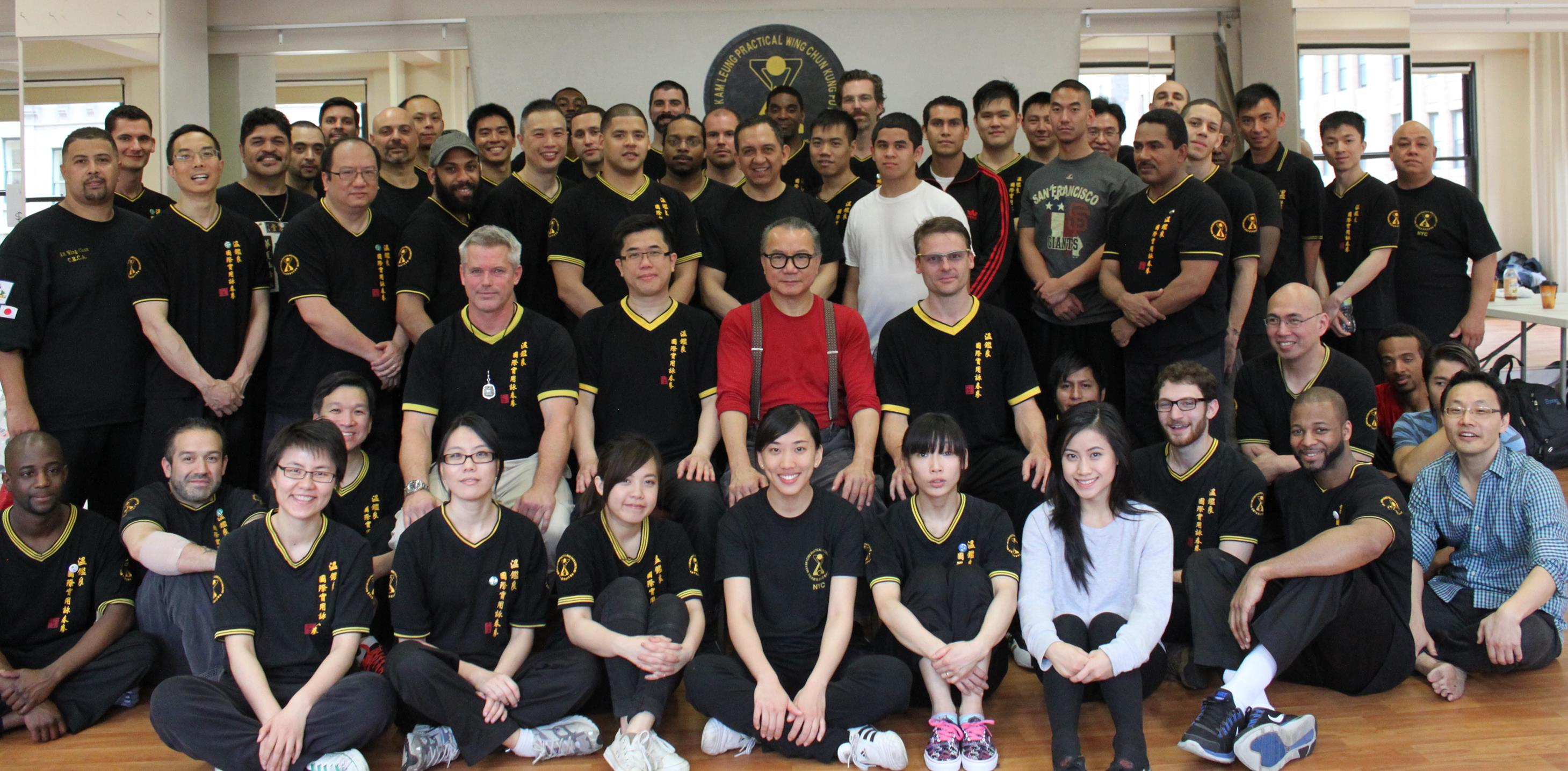
Group photo from Wan Kam-leung's first American seminar in New York City

The Hong Kong Police Force, in 1993, invited Wan to be Chief Wing Chun Instructor to the G4 (VIP Protection Unit (Hong Kong)). He has been the only Kung Fu master to be employed by the British Hong Kong government.

Wong Shun-leung awarded Wan with his Senior Instructor Certificate in 1988. Wan worked to improve his Wing Chun, branching from his knowledge of Wong Shun-leung's style. In 1994, with Wong's consent, the style he had developed was named "Practical Wing Chun". Sifu Wan promised not to teach this style until after Wong's death, out of respect for the Wong died in 1997, and Wan subsequently opened a school for Practical Wing Chun and began teaching full-time. The school resides on Nathan Road in Kowloon, Hong Kong.

The modifications were designed to maintain a modern, adaptable martial art aimed at providing self-defense against a "committed and real attack", with all of the basic tenets of traditional Wing Chun. As such, Practical Wing Chun employs the idea of using body mechanics to overcome a physically stronger opponent. This is done by adhering to five components of a strong body structure - five centerlines, relaxed shoulders, elbows pointing down, flexible wrists, and 135-degree angles. Wan is adamant about making sure the art does not become obsolete, remaining practical through constant analysis and revision of the principles and techniques. Wan has several students who have opened schools across the world, including several in Australia, Germany, Denmark, Holland, France, and USA On 19 November 2017, Wan Kam Leung Practical Wing Chun Kung Fu International held the Guinness World Record for teaching the largest martial arts class ever.

=== Awards ===
- Sifu of the Year, World Ving Tsun Athletic Association Hall of Fame 2008.
