= Wing Chun (TV series) =

- 詠春
- Genre: Martial arts Action; Wuxia
- Written by: Chung Sing Yuen
- Directed by: Sing Chi Chiu; Fung Yuen Wah
- Presented by: Lee Shui Hap; Lam Siu Ming
- Starring: Nicholas Tse; Sammo Hung; Yuen Biao; Anson Leung; Hu Ke; Rain Lee; Sammy Hung
- Countries of origin: Hong Kong; China
- Original languages: Cantonese; Mandarin
- No. of episodes: 40

Production
- Producer: Chan Wui Ngai
- Production locations: Jinhua, Zhejiang, China
- Running time: 45 minutes
- Production companies: Universe Entertainment Ltd. Shaxi Film Studio; Guangzhou Wise Culture Communication Co., Ltd.

Original release
- Network: TVB
- Release: 2006 – 2007

Wing Chun (Chinese: 詠春) is a 2006 TVB TV series starring Nicholas Tse. The series concluded filming in 2007. It featured actors Nicholas Tse, Yuen Biao, Anson Leung, Ji Chunhua, Sammo Hung and his youngest son, Sammy Hung.

== Plot ==
The story revolved around the elderly Leung Jan and his life in Foshan during the late Qing dynasty. The show follows the life of Leung Bik, the eager but impulsive son of Leung Jan, the local doctor and martial art master. The father and son clash head frequently as Leung Bik desires to learn martial arts but his father wants him to study medicine like his brother Leung Chun. On the other end, there is Ko Ming a poor disciple of a drunken master who has traveled all the way to Fo Shan to find his long lost sister. Leung Bik and Ko Ming become rivals when Leung wrongfully but not intentionally harms the sister and Ko Ming ends up working for a corrupt family, the Longs.

The characters grow as the innocent Ko Ming gets corrupted by pragmatic evil and is put through trial and tribulation that eventually numbs him and Leung learns responsibility when he runs to Hong Kong after being accused of murder. Complex characters set against love triangles and the adventures of other supporting characters brings this classic show to live.

=== Cast ===
Cast	Role
Nicholas Tse	Leung Bik 梁壁
Sammo Hung	Wong Wah-bo 黃華寶
Yuen Biao	Leung Jan 梁贊
Anson Leung	Leung Chun 梁春
Philip Ng	Chan Wah-shun 陳華順
Hu Ke (胡可)	Kau Ku Leung 九姑娘
Rain Lee (李彩樺)	Fong Yee 方怡
Sammy Hung (洪天照)	Ko Ming 高明
Liu Ziyan (劉梓妍)	Siu Man Tau 小饅頭
Siqin Gaoli (斯琴高麗)	Hung Lin 洪蓮

=== International broadcast ===
Country	Network(s)/Station(s)	Series premiere	Title
Thailand	Mono29	November 16, 2015	พยัคฆ์ร้ายหมัดหย่งชุน (Payakrai Mud Yong Chun)
