= Chan Wah-shun =

Chinese martial artist

- Born: 1836; Shunde District, Foshan, Qing Empire
- Died: 1913 (aged 76–77); Shunde District, Foshan, Republic of China
- Native name: 陳華順
- Other names: Money Changer Wah (找錢華); Money Clutcher Wah (爪錢華); Wah the Bull
- Teachers: Leung Jan; Woodman Wah

Other information
- Occupation: martial artist, Currency exchanger
- Children: Chan Yu-gum (son)
- Notable students: Ip Man
- Notable school: Hang Chai Tong

Chinese name
- Traditional Chinese: 陳華順
- Simplified Chinese: 陈华顺
Transcriptions
Standard Mandarin
- Hanyu Pinyin: Chén Huáshùn

Chan Wah-shun (c. 1836 – 1913), nicknamed Money Changer Wah (找錢華) and Money Clutcher Wah (爪錢華), was a student of the Wing Chun grandmaster Leung Jan (梁贊). He is noted for being the martial arts teacher of Ip Man.

== Background ==
Born in Shunde District, Foshan in 1836, Chan ran a currency exchange stall near Dit Da and Wing Chun practitioner Leung Jan's herbal medicine clinic in Foshan. He carried heavy loads of coins every day, and so developed great strength over the years. In 1884, his son Chan Yu-gum (陳汝錦) was born.

In 1888, Leung Jan's physical health had begun to decline and his sons, including Leung Bik (梁壁 Liáng Bì; loeng4 bik1) and Leung Chun (梁春 loeng4 cheun1), had left Foshan to make a living. They had no intention of taking over his training hall, named Wing Sang Tong (榮生堂), also known as Jan Sang Tong (贊生堂), which was looked after by his student Lee Wah (李華), nicknamed Woodman Wah (木人華).

While searching for a successor, Leung took in Chan as his student. Leung would later often return to his hometown Gulao Village (古勞), and Chan continued to be trained by Lee. Chan also learned traditional Chinese medicine Dit Da from Leung. Chan eventually closed his money changing business and helped run a Dit Da clinic.

Upon the death of Lee in 1889, Chan took over the operations of the training hall, while Leung went back and forth between Foshan and Gulao. Wing Sang Tong was later renamed to Hang Chai Tong (杏濟堂).

Chan started training his young son in Wing Chun in 1892. Chan assisted Leung for only four years.

With the death of Leung Jan in 1901, Chan left Hang Chai Tong and worked at a ceramic shop at Lianhua Street.

In 1906, he rented a huge ancestral hall at Yejia Village, Chancheng District at Foshan for teaching Wing Chun, which was where he accepted his 16th and last student, Ip Man. Chan was only able to teach the students for three years when in 1909, he suffered a mild stroke. Chan asked his second student, Ng Chung-sok (吳仲素), to take over the hall and continue with students' trainings before retiring back to his village at Shunde. Chan died of illness in 1913 and was buried there.

== Lineage ==
Lineage in Wing Chun
Sifu	Leung Jan (梁贊)
Other teachers	Sihing Woodman Wah (木人華)
Chan Wah-shun (陳華順)
Known students	Ng Siu-lo (吳小魯) (first?) * Ng Chung-sok (吳仲素) (second); Wong Lee-san (黃李辰); Ho Hon-lui (何漢侶); Lui Yu-chai (雷汝濟); Cha Un-sang (姚財); Chan Yu-gum (陳汝錦) (Chan's son); Ip Man (葉問) (last); Lee Shing 16 students in total

== In popular culture ==
In the 1978 film Descendants of Wing Chun, he was portrayed by Norman Chui.

In the 1978 film Warriors Two, he was portrayed by Casanova Wong.

In the 1981 TVB television drama series Kung Fu Master of Fat Shan, he was portrayed by Ray Lui.

In the 2005 TVB television drama series Real Kung Fu, he was portrayed by Timmy Hung.

In the 2006 TVB television drama series Wing Chun, he was portrayed by Philip Ng.

In the 2010 film The Legend Is Born: Ip Man, he was portrayed by Sammo Hung.

In the 2013 film The Grandmaster, he was portrayed by Yuen Woo-ping.

In the 2013 TVB television drama series Ip Man, he was portrayed by Yuen Wah.
