= Leung Yee-tai =

Wing Chun practitioner

- Born: unknown Qing Empire
- Died: unknown Qing Empire
- Native name: 梁二娣
- Style: Wing Chun
- Teachers: Chi Sin; Wong Wah-bo

Other information
- Occupation: martial artist, boatman
- Notable students: Wong Wah-bo; Leung Jan

Chinese name
- Traditional Chinese: 梁二娣
- Simplified Chinese: 梁二娣
Transcriptions
Standard Mandarin
- Hanyu Pinyin: Liáng'èrdì

Leung Yee-tai was a Wing Chun master of the late Qing Dynasty.

== Background ==
Leung Yee-tai had become associated with Tiandihui and anti-Qing Dynasty resistance.

He was a strong boatman who steered a riverboat by pushing a long pole against the river bottom. A Shaolin monk Chi Sin (至善禪師) saw that he was a natural successor to the Southern Shaolin pole fighting skill called six and a half point long pole.

He taught Wong Wah-bo his pole fighting skill in exchange for the Wing Chun fist-fighting skill. Though he was a student of Wong in Wing Chun, he was actually Wong's sifu in the pole fighting skill. Wong modified the pole fighting skills using Wing Chun principles. The modified pole skill had since part of Wing Chun skills set.

He met Leung Jan of Foshan, a young herbal doctor, when he was sick. He then trained Leung Jan when he was already an old man at over sixty years of age. He went on to introduce Jan to Wong. Because both of Wong and Jan were from Gulao (古勞) Village, Wong imparted his full system of Wing Chun skills to him.

== Lineage ==
Lineage in Wing Chun
sifu	Wong Wah-bo (黃華寶)
other teacher	learned pole fighting skill from abbot Chi Sin (至善禪師)
Leung Yee-tai (梁二娣)
known student	Leung Jan (梁贊) taught his pole fighting skill to his sifu

== In popular culture ==
Leung Yee-tai was portrayed by Kong Ngai in the 1981 TVB television drama series Kung Fu Master of Fat Shan.

He was portrayed by Lam Ching-ying in the 1981 Sammo Hung film The Prodigal Son.

In the 2005 TVB television drama series Real Kung Fu, he was portrayed by Bryan Leung.
