= Leung Bik =

Chinese martial artists

- Born: Leung Bik-wo (梁璧和); 1843; Foshan, Guangdong, Qing Empire
- Died: 1911 (aged 67–68); British Hong Kong
- Native name: 梁璧
- Other names: Bo Lam (寶林); Mr. Bik (先生璧)
- Style: Wing Chun
- Teachers: Leung Jan; Wong Wah-bo

Other information
- Children: Leung Shiu-hung (son); Leung Shiu-kau (son)
- Notable relatives: Leung Jan (father); Ms. Cheng (mother)
- Notable students: Ip Man

Chinese name
- Chinese: 梁璧
Transcriptions
Standard Mandarin
- Hanyu Pinyin: Liáng bì

Leung Bik-wo (birth name)
- Chinese: 梁璧和
Transcriptions
Standard Mandarin
- Hanyu Pinyin: Liáng bì hé

Tai-wah (courtesy name)
- Traditional Chinese: 態華
- Simplified Chinese: 态华
Transcriptions
Standard Mandarin
- Hanyu Pinyin: Tài huá

Leung Bik (born Leung Bik-wo with the courtesy name Tai-wah; 1843 – 1911), also known as Mr. Bik (先生璧), was a Wing Chun martial artist. He was one of Ip Man's teachers.

== History ==
He was born in Foshan in 1843 as the second of the nine sons of Leung Jan by his second wife with the surname of Cheng (鄭).

At the young age he practiced Wing Chun under his father and grand-teacher Wong Wah-bo (黃華寶). By then, Leung Bik's Wing Chun skill sets were in its most completed forms, which three forms includes Mu ren zhuang, Eight-cut knives and Six-and-a-Half Point Pole, as well as Qigong.

Due to the political situation in the late Qing Dynasty, Leung left Foshan for Hong Kong, where he made a living running a silk and satin business at Cha Wai Street (乍畏街) (present day Jervois Street) in Sheung Wan.

In 1909, Leung was introduced to Ip Man by Ip's classmate Lai, who was also a son of Leung's friend. Leung challenged Ip to a friendly sparring match at Lai's house, Leung defeated Ip twice and Ip left without a word. Impressed by the young man's skill, Leung requested Lai for the disheartened Ip's return and trained him until his own death in 1911.

== Known descendants ==
Leung had two sons:

- 1st son: Leung Shiu-hung (梁肇鴻), courtesy name Sam-pei (心培) – Born in 1880, also skilled in martial arts, he was a businessman, due to an economic downturn, he died of depression in 1929.
  - Grandson: Leung Man-lok (梁文樂): son of Leung Shiu-hung, a 7th generation Wing Chun practitioner, currently resided in Hong Kong.
    - Great-granddaughter: Leung Lai-ngor (梁麗娥) – currently resided in Canada.
    - Great-granddaughter: Leung Choi (梁彩) – currently resided at Nanhai District.
- 2nd son: Leung Shiu-kau (梁肇球), courtesy name Ting-pei (鼎培) – Born in 1886, no known information, presumed deceased.

== In popular culture ==
In the 2006 television series Wing Chun, he was portrayed by Nicholas Tse.

In the 2010 film The Legend Is Born: Ip Man, he was portrayed by Ip Chun, the eldest son of Ip Man.

In the 2013 television series Ip Man, he was portrayed by Bruce Leung.
