= Leung Jan =

Chinese martial artist

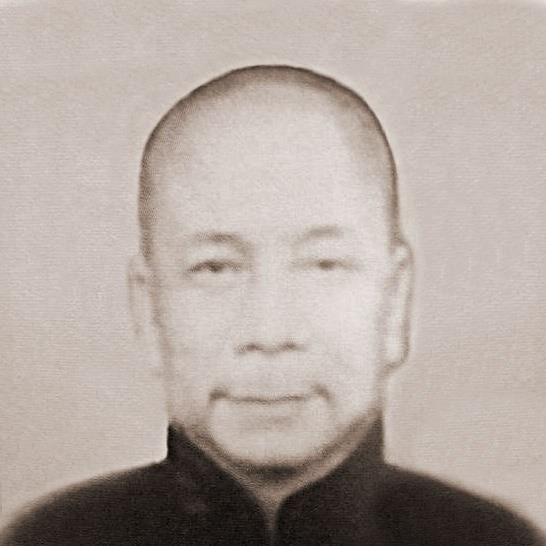
- Leung in 1890
- Born: Leung Tak-wing (梁德榮); 1821; Heshan, Guangdong, Qing Empire
- Died: 1901 (aged 80–81); Heshan, Guangdong, Qing Empire
- Native name: 梁贊
- Other names: Mr. Jan of Foshan (佛山贊先生); King of Wing Chun Kuen (詠春拳王)
- Nationality: Chinese
- Style: Wing Chun
- Teachers: Leung Yee-tai; Wong Wah-bo

Other information
- Occupation: Dit Da practitioner, martial artist
- Spouse: Ms. Wong; Ms. Cheng; Ms. Poon
- Children: Leung Yuen (son); Leung Bik (son); Leung Chi (son); Leung Chun (son); Leung Chung-wah (son); Leung Shu-wah (son); Leung Ko (son); Leung Nim-wah (son); Leung Pak-jau (son); 8 daughters
- Notable students: Leung Bik; Chan Wah-shun
- Notable school: Hang Chai Tong

Chinese name
- Traditional Chinese: 梁贊
- Simplified Chinese: 梁赞
Transcriptions
Standard Mandarin
- Hanyu Pinyin: Liáng Zàn

Leung Tak-wing (birth name)
- Traditional Chinese: 梁德榮
- Simplified Chinese: 梁德荣
Transcriptions
Standard Mandarin
- Hanyu Pinyin: Liáng Déróng

Leung Jan (born Leung Tak-wing; 1821–1901) was a Chinese martial artist and Wing Chun practitioner from Heshan, Guangdong. He was known in Foshan as Mr. Jan of Foshan and King of Wing Chun Kuen.

Leung Jan is one of the earliest well-documented practitioners of Wing Chun, which was mainly passed down verbally from teacher to student prior to Leung Jan.

== Background ==
Leung Jan was born Leung Tak-wing in 1826 in Heshan, Guangdong. He had an elder brother, Leung Tak-nam, who would later become a successful businessman. His father later moved to Kuai Zi, Foshan and there Leung helped run a traditional Chinese medicine Dit Da clinic. At the age of 18, he was trained by Leung Yee-tai in Southern Shaolin skills. Yee-tai later introduced Jan to his partner Wong Wah-bo, who was also a Gulao (古勞) resident like Jan. Wong taught Jan the entire Wing Chun skill set.

From 1870 onwards, under the nickname Leung Jan, he succeed his father medical business and work within the Wing Sang Tong (榮生堂), also known as Jan Sang Tong, in Foshan and would occasionally take in students to train them in Wing Chun privately. His name eventually became well known due to his wins in competitive bouts and he was respected by other martial artists. He was called Mr. Jan of Foshan (佛山贊先生). He later became a government official and was known as King of Wing Chun Kuen (詠春拳王). His training and medical hall was looked after by his student Lee Wah (李華), nicknamed Woodman Wah (木人華).

== Personal life ==
Leung had three wives, nine sons and eight daughters. His first wife Ms. Wong (黃氏), bore him no children. His second wife Ms. Cheng (鄭氏), bore him seven sons. His third wife Ms. Poon (潘氏), bore him two sons.

His nine sons were:

- 1st: Leung Yuen-fuk (梁元福), courtesy name Yan-wah (恩華) – with Ms. Poon, learned Wing Chun from his father, and on later years went to Vietnam with him to do business there, he had a son, and died at the age of 24.
- 2nd: Leung Bik-wo (梁璧和), courtesy name Tai-wah (態華) – with Ms. Cheng, born in 1845, learned Wing Chun from his father and grand-teacher Wong Wah-bo, later moved to Hong Kong with a friend to set up a clothing business there. He had two sons. He further trained Ip Man in 1909 and died in 1911 at the age of 65.
- 3rd: Leung Chi-yin (梁賜賢), courtesy name Hin-wah (憲華) – with Ms. Poon, he had no children.
- 4th: Leung Yu-chun (梁遇春), courtesy name Mou-wah (懋華) – with Ms. Cheng, born during the Tongzhi period in Year 9, April 12, he was more verse into his father's medical practices and medical ethics, but later switched to business, he had six sons and three daughters and died at age 54.
- 5th: Leung Chung-wah (梁忠華) – with Ms. Cheng, died prematurely.
- 6th: Leung Shu-wah (梁恕華) – with Ms. Cheng, died prematurely.
- 7th: Leung Ko-peng (梁高明), courtesy name Yue-wah (愈華) – with Ms. Cheng, born during the Tongzhi period, year of Wuchen, he had two sons.
- 8th: Leung Nim-wah (梁念華) – with Ms. Cheng, died prematurely.
- 9th: Leung Pak-jau (梁百就), courtesy name Sai-wun (世煥) – with Ms. Cheng, due to death of his mother, he was supposed to be sent to a wet nurse for breast-feeding, however along the way he was abducted and was sold to a new family.

There is currently no available historical information on any of Leung's eight daughters.

== Later life and death ==
In 1888, his physical health began to decline and his five remaining sons had since left Foshan to make a living and they had no intention to take over his training and medical hall. Notably, Leung Yuen moved to Vietnam, while Leung Bik moved to Hong Kong.

While searching for a successor, Leung took in a money changer Chan Wah-shun as his student. Leung later often went back and forth between Foshan and his hometown Gulao Village, and Chan continued to be trained by Lee. Leung also taught Chan in Dit Da. Chan eventually closed his money changing business and helped run a Dit Da clinic.

After the death of Lee Wah on the following year in 1889, Chan took over the operations of the training and medical hall, while Leung continued to go back and forth between Foshan and Gulao. Wing Sang Tong was later renamed to Hang Chai Tong (杏濟堂).

Around the age of 80, Leung retired permanently back to his hometown, there he taught a group of four youths, including his nephew Wong Wah-sum, a modified form of Wing Chun which focused on side-facing positions (known as Kulo village Pin Sun Wing Chun in present day). Leung died in 1901.

== Lineage ==
Lineage (詠春拳承傳)
Sifu	Wong Wah-bo (黃華寶) 'chant spring'; Leung Yee-tai (梁二娣) 'six points and a half pole'
Leung Jan (梁贊)
Known students	Leung Yuen; Leung Bik; Leung Chun; Leung Ko; Woodman Wah; Chan Wah-shun (陳華順); Wong Wah-sum

== In popular culture ==
In the 1978 film Descendants of Wing Chun, he was portrayed by Melvin Wong.

He was portrayed by Bryan Leung in the 1978 film Warriors Two as the master role as a more disciplined and older man. He takes up the student Chan Wah-shun alongside a few other ones he is already training, but is caught up in an elaborate scheme by Foshan's new mayor. The mayor plans to remove all top martial artists from the town, so he may rule with an iron fist. Putting both Cashier Wah (Chan Wah-shun), and Leung Jan himself on the mayor's hit list.

In the 1981 TVB television drama series Kung Fu Master of Fat Shan, he was portrayed by Kwan Hoi-san.

Leung Jan, as an already somewhat skilled martial artist, is featured in a student role in the 1981 film The Prodigal Son. In this fictional tale of his life, Yuen Biao as Leung Jan, is a young man determined to learn real martial arts after a humiliating defeat by undercover Wing Chun master Leung Yee-tai who is a seemingly harmless man, despite Leung Jan being known as Foshan's "kung fu king".

Leung was portrayed by Yuen Biao again in the Hong Kong TV series Real Kung Fu, which aired on TVB in 2005, along with Wing Chun a year later or two from 2006 to 2007.
